= Gérard Depardieu filmography =

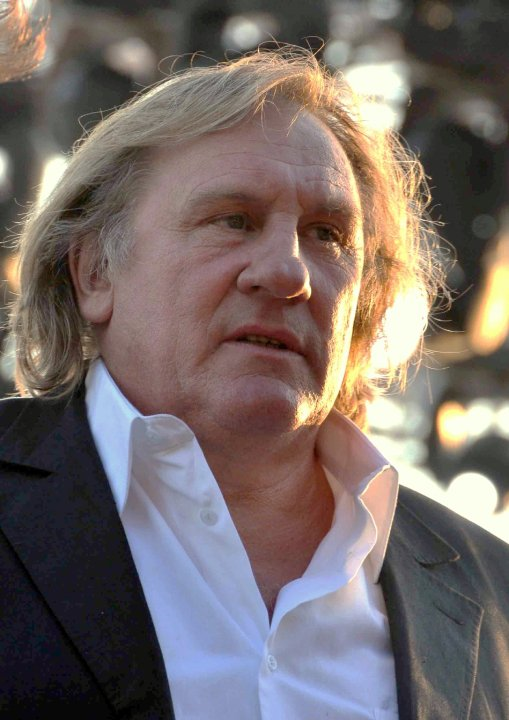
Depardieu at the 2010 Cannes Film Festival.

Gérard Depardieu (born 27 December 1948) is a French actor, filmmaker, businessman and vineyard owner. He is one of the most prolific actors in film history, having completed over 250 movies since 1967.

== Filmography ==
Key
†	Denotes films that have not yet been released

=== Cinema ===
Year	Title	Role	Director	Notes
1966	Christmas Carole		Agnès Varda	Unfinished
1967	Le beatnik et le minet	The Beatnik	Roger Leenhardt	Short; first completed film role
1971	Le Cri du cormoran, le soir au-dessus des jonques	Henri	Michel Audiard	First feature film role
1971	La vie sentimentale de Georges le tueur		Daniel Berger	Short
1971	A Few Hours of Sunlight	Pierre	Jacques Deray	
1972	Le Tueur	Frédo Babasch	Denys de La Patellière	
1972	The Life Annuity	Victor	Pierre Tchernia	
1972	Bad Luck	Burglar	José Giovanni	
1972	Nathalie Granger	Salesman	Marguerite Duras	
1973	The Year 01	Passenger	Jacques Doillon, Alain Resnais, ...	
1973	Two Men in Town	Young Gangster	José Giovanni	
1973	The Dominici Affair	Zeze Perrin	Claude Bernard-Aubert	
1973	Rude journée pour la reine	Fabien	René Allio	
1973	At the Meeting with Joyous Death	Beretti	Juan Luis Buñuel	
1974	Stavisky	Young Inventor	Alain Resnais	
1974	The Holes	Postman	Pierre Tchernia	
1974	Going Places	Jean-Claude	Bertrand Blier	
1974	Woman of Ganges	Man on the beach	Marguerite Duras	Broadcast on television in January 1974, prior to its theatrical release in April
1974	Vincent, François, Paul and the Others	Jean Lavallee	Claude Sautet	
1975	The Wonderful Crook	Pierre	Claude Goretta	
1975	7 morts sur ordonnance	Doctor Jean-Pierre Berg	Jacques Rouffio	
1976	1900	Olmo Dalcò	Bernardo Bertolucci	
1976	Barocco	Samson	André Téchiné	
1976	Mistress	Olivier	Barbet Schroeder	
1976	The Last Woman	Gerard	Marco Ferreri	
1976	I Love You Neither	Peasant	Serge Gainsbourg	Cameo
1977	Violanta	Fortunat	Daniel Schmid	
1977	The Lorry	Him	Marguerite Duras	
1977	Rene the Cane	René Bornier	Francis Girod	
1977	Baxter, Vera Baxter	Michel Cayre	Marguerite Duras	
1977	This Sweet Sickness	David Martinaud	Claude Miller	
1977	At Night All Cats Are Crazy	Philippe Larcher	Gérard Zingg	
1977	Providence	Kevin Langham / Kevin Woodford (voice)	Alain Resnais	French dub for David Warner's character
1978	Sugar	Raoul-Renaud Homecourt	Jacques Rouffio	
1978	Bye Bye Monkey	Gérard Lafayette	Marco Ferreri	
1978	The Left-Handed Woman	Man with the T-Shirt	Peter Handke	
1978	Get Out Your Handkerchiefs	Raoul	Bertrand Blier	
1979	The Dogs	Morel	Alain Jessua	
1979	Traffic Jam	Franco	Luigi Comencini	
1979	Cold Cuts	Alphonse Tram	Bertrand Blier	
1980	My American Uncle	René Ragueneau	Alain Resnais	
1980	The Last Metro	Bernard Granger	François Truffaut	
1980	Hurricane Rosy	Raoul Lamarre	Mario Monicelli	
1980	Loulou	Loulou	Maurice Pialat	
1980	Inspector Blunder	Roger Morzini	Claude Zidi	
1980	Je vous aime	Patrick	Claude Berri	
1981	La Chèvre	Campana	Francis Veber	
1981	Choice of Arms	Mickey	Alain Corneau	
1981	The Woman Next Door	Bernard Coudray	François Truffaut	
1981	Blow Out	Jack Terry (voice)	Brian De Palma	French dub for John Travolta's character
1982	The Big Brother	Gérard Berger / Bernard Vigo	Francis Girod	
1982	The Return of Martin Guerre	Martin Guerre / Arnaud de Tihl	Daniel Vigne	
1983	Danton	Georges Danton	Andrzej Wajda	
1983	Les Compères	Jean Lucas	Francis Veber	
1983	The Moon in the Gutter	Gérard Delmas	Jean-Jacques Beineix	
1983	The Wounded Man	Jean Lerman (voice only)	Patrice Chéreau	French dubbing for Vittorio Mezzogiorno's character
1984	Le tartuffe	Tartuffe	Himself	
1984	Fort Saganne	Charles Saganne	Alain Corneau	
1984	Right bank, left bank	Paul Senanques	Philippe Labro	
1985	Police	Louis Vincent Mangin	Maurice Pialat	
1985	One Woman or Two	Julien Chayssac	Daniel Vigne	
1986	Les Fugitifs	Jean Lucas	Francis Veber	
1986	Rue du Départ	Clara's Father	Tony Gatlif	
1986	Evening Dress	Bob	Bertrand Blier	
1986	Jean de Florette	Jean Cadoret	Claude Berri	
1986	Je hais les acteurs	Inmate	Gérard Krawczyk	Cameo
1987	Under the Sun of Satan	Donissan	Maurice Pialat	
1988	Camille Claudel	Auguste Rodin	Bruno Nuytten	
1988	A Strange Place to Meet	Charles	François Dupeyron	
1989	Deux	Marc Lambert	Claude Zidi	
1989	I Want to Go Home	Christian Gauthier	Alain Resnais	
1989	Too Beautiful for You	Bernard Barthélémy	Bertrand Blier	
1989	Henry V	King Henry V of England (voice)	Kenneth Branagh	French dub for Kenneth Branagh's character
1990	Cyrano de Bergerac	Cyrano de Bergerac	Jean-Paul Rappeneau	
1990	Uranus	Léopold Lajeunesse	Claude Berri	
1990	Green Card	Georges Fauré	Peter Weir	
1991	Merci la vie	Doctor Marc Antoine Worms	Bertrand Blier	
1991	My Father the Hero	André Arnel	Gérard Lauzier	
1991	All The Mornings of The World	Marin Marais	Alain Corneau	
1992	1492: Conquest of Paradise	Christopher Columbus	Ridley Scott	
1992	The Timekeeper	Roissy Employee	Jeff Blyth	Short
1993	Germinal	Toussaint Maheu	Claude Berri	
1993	Alas for Me	Simon Donnadieu	Jean-Luc Godard	
1994	The Machine	Doctor Marc Lacroix	François Dupeyron	
1994	Colonel Chabert	Amédé Chabert	Yves Angelo	
1994	A Pure Formality	Onoff	Giuseppe Tornatore	
1994	My Father the Hero	André Arnel	Steve Miner	
1995	Élisa	Jacques 'Lébovitch' Desmoulin	Jean Becker	
1995	The Boy	Gérard	Maurice Pialat	
1995	Guardian Angels	Antoine Carco	Jean-Marie Poiré	
1995	The Horseman on the Roof	The Inspector	Jean-Paul Rappeneau	Cameo
1995	One Hundred and One Nights	Himself	Agnès Varda	Cameo
1996	Bogus	Bogus	Norman Jewison	
1996	Hamlet	Reynaldo	Kenneth Branagh	Cameo
1996	The Secret Agent	Ossipon	Christopher Hampton	
1996	Unhook the Stars	Big Tommy Bellaveau	Nick Cassavetes	
1996	The Best Job in the World	Laurent Monier	Gérard Lauzier	
1997	XXL	Jean Bourdalou	Ariel Zeitoun	
1998	Bimboland	Laurent Gaspard	Ariel Zeitoun	
1998	Notes of Love	Lawyer Levi	Mimmo Calopresti	
1998	The Man in the Iron Mask	Porthos	Randall Wallace	
1999	The Bridge	Georges	Himself, co-director with Frédéric Auburtin	
1999	Asterix & Obelix Take On Caesar	Obelix	Claude Zidi	
2000	Mirka	Strix	Rachid Benhadj	
2000	Vatel	François Vatel	Roland Joffé	
2000	Actors	Himself	Bertrand Blier	Cameo
2000	102 Dalmatians	Jean-Pierre Le Pelt	Kevin Lima	
2000	The Envy of Gods	Bernard	Vladimir Menshov	
2000	All The Love there is	Molotov	Sergio Rubini	
2000	Chicken Run	Rocky	Nick Park & Peter Lord	French dub, theatrical version only
2001	CQ	Andrezej	Roman Coppola	
2001	Vidocq	Vidocq	Pitof	
2001	The Closet	Félix Santini	Francis Veber	
2001	Unfair Competition	Professor Angelo	Ettore Scola	
2001	Witches to the North	Himself	Giovanni Veronesi	Cameo
2002	Blanche	D'Artagnan	Bernie Bonvoisin	Cameo
2002	I Am Dina	Jacob Grønlev	Ole Bornedal	
2002	City of Ghosts	Emile	Matt Dillon	
2002	A Loving Father	Leo Shepherd	Jacob Berger	
2002	Between Strangers	Max	Edoardo Ponti	
2002	Asterix & Obelix: Mission Cleopatra	Obelix	Alain Chabat	
2003	Nathalie...	Bernard	Anne Fontaine	
2003	Have A Good Trip	Jean-Étienne Beaufort	Jean-Paul Rappeneau	
2003	Crime Spree	Daniel Foray	Brad Mirman	
2003	The Car Keys	Cheesemaker	Laurent Baffie	Cameo
2003	Ruby & Quentin	Quentin	Francis Veber	
2003	Le pacte du silence	Joachim	Graham Guit	
2004	RRRrrrr!!!	Chief of the Dirty Hair Tribe	Alain Chabat	
2004	San-Antonio	Bérurier	Frédéric Auburtin	
2004	Changing Times	Antoine Lavau	André Téchiné	
2004	Battle of the Brave	Father Thomas Blondeau	Jean Beaudin	
2004	The 36	Denis Klein	Olivier Marchal	
2005	Olé!	François Veber	Florence Quentin	
2005	Boudu	Boudu	Gérard Jugnot	
2005	Let's Be Friends	Serge	Éric Toledano and Olivier Nakache	
2005	How Much Do You Love Me?	Charly	Bertrand Blier	
2005	La vie de Michel Muller est plus belle que la vôtre	Himself	Michel Muller	Cameo
2006	Last Holiday	Chef Didier	Wayne Wang	
2006	Paris, I Love You	The boss	Himself, co-director with Frédéric Auburtin	Segment – Quartier Latin (cameo)
2006	When I Was a Singer	Alain Moreau	Xavier Giannoli	
2007	La Vie en Rose	Louis Leplée	Olivier Dahan	
2007	Michou d'Auber	Georges	Thomas Gilou	
2008	Disco	Jean-François Civette	Fabien Onteniente	
2008	Mesrine	Guido	Jean-François Richet	
2008	Babylon A.D.	Gorsky	Mathieu Kassovitz	
2008	Bouquet final	Hugo	Michel Delgado	
2008	Hello Goodbye	Alain Gaash	Graham Guit	
2008	The Easy Way	Godfather	Jean-Paul Rouve	Cameo, voice only
2008	Vsyo mogut koroli		Aleksandr Chernyaev	
2008	Trouble at Timpetill	General Igor	Nicolas Bary	
2008	Asterix at the Olympic Games	Obelix	Frédéric Forestier & Thomas Langmann	
2009	Coco	Cardiologist	Gad Elmaleh	Cameo
2009	Bellamy	Paul Bellamy	Claude Chabrol	
2009	Diamant 13	Mat	Gilles Béhat	
2009	In the Beginning	Abel	Xavier Giannoli	
2010	Dumas	Alexandre Dumas	Safy Nebbou	
2010	Potiche	Maurice Babin	François Ozon	
2010	Mammuth	Serge Pilardosse	Gustave Kervern & Benoît Delépine	
2010	Small World	Konrad Lang	Bruno Chiche	
2010	Pozdnyaya lyubov	Gerold	Sabit Kurmanbekov	
2010	Glenn, the Flying Robot	TV Reporter	Marc Goldstein	
2010	My Afternoons with Margueritte	Germain Chazes	Jean Becker	
2011	Un baiser papillon	Doctor	Karine Silla	Cameo
2011	Grenouille d'hiver	Benjamin	Slony Sow	Short
2012	Life of Pi	The Cook	Ang Lee	
2012	The Big Night	Juvénal	Gustave Kervern & Benoît Delépine	
2012	Moy greshnyy angel		Talgat Temenov	
2012	The Man Who Laughs	Ursus	Jean-Pierre Améris	
2012	Asterix and Obelix: God save Britannia	Obelix	Laurent Tirard	
2012	Gabin le mime	Tocqueboeuf	Cyril Rigon	Short
2012	Frank-Étienne vers la béatitude	Frank-Étienne Boulard	Constance Meyer	Short
2013	Turf	Monsieur Paul	Fabien Onteniente	
2013	Les invincibles	Jacky Camboulaze	Frédéric Berthe	
2013	A Farewell to Fools	Ipu	Bogdan Dumitrescu	
2013	Cadences obstinées	Father Villedieu	Fanny Ardant	
2013	Niente può fermarci	French peasant	Luigi Cecinelli	
2013	The Mark of the Angels – Miserere	Lionel Kasdan	Sylvain White	
2014	Welcome to New York	Devereaux	Abel Ferrara	VOD release
2014	United Passions	Jules Rimet	Frédéric Auburtin	Cannes Film Festival premiere in 2014, general release in 2015
2014	Sex, kofe, sigarety	He	Sergey Oldenburg	Segment – Two/Deux
2014	Viktor	Victor Lambert	Philippe Martinez	
2015	Valley of Love	Gérard	Guillaume Nicloux	
2015	Agafia	Savka	Jean-Pierre Mocky	Short
2015	Le rustre et le juge	Charpentevich	Jean-Pierre Mocky	Short
2015	Le magicien et les siamois	Borach	Jean-Pierre Mocky	Short
2016	The End	The Man	Guillaume Nicloux	VOD release
2016	Holy Love	Jean	Gustave Kervern & Benoît Delépine	
2016	Tour de France	Serge Desmoulins	Rachid Djaidani	
2016	La Dream Team	Jacques Belloc	Thomas Sorriaux	
2016	Le divan de Staline	Joseph Stalin	Fanny Ardant	
2016	Rhapsody	Gérard	Constance Meyer	Short
2017	Carbon	Aron Goldstein	Olivier Marchal	
2017	Nobody's Perfect!	Gérard Morlet	Florence Quentin	
2017	Let the Sunshine In	Denis	Claire Denis	
2017	You Only Live Once	Duges	Federico Cueva	
2018	The Brand New Adventures of Aladin	Christopher Columbus	Lionel Steketee	Cameo
2018	Mon cochon et moi	Vania	Frank Dobrin	
2018	Amoureux de ma femme	Patrick	Daniel Auteuil	
2018	To the Ends of the World	Saintonge	Guillaume Nicloux	
2018	Sgt. Stubby: An American Hero	Gaston Baptiste	Richard Lanni	Voice
2018	La belle affaire	Truck driver	Constance Meyer	Short
2019	Fahim	Sylvain Charpentier	Pierre-François Martin-Laval	
2019	Thalasso	Himself	Guillaume Nicloux	
2019	Heavy Duty	Raoul Taupin	Bertrand Blier	
2019	Grenouille de cristal	Benjamin	Slony Sow	Short
2020	Creators: The Past	Master of Faith	Piergiuseppe Zaia	Filmed in 2014
2020	Home Front	Feu-de-Bois	Lucas Belvaux	
2021	Robust	Georges	Constance Meyer	
2021	Do You Do You Saint-Tropez	Maurice Lefranc	Nicolas Benamou	
2021	Lost Illusions	Dauriat	Xavier Giannoli	
2021	Adieu Paris	Michaël	Édouard Baer	
2022	Retirement Home	Lino Vartan	Thomas Gilou	
2022	Maigret	Jules Maigret	Patrice Leconte	
2022	The Green Shutters	Jules Maugin	Jean Becker	
2023	Umami	Gabriel Carvin	Slony Sow	
2024	Retirement home 2	Lino Vartan	Claude Zidi Jr.	Cameo, footage from the first film
2026	Ahmed Bey	Hussein Dey	Jamal Choorjah	Filmed in 2018
TBA	La voix des steppes †	Anatole	Himself, co-director with Yermek Shinarbayev	Filmed in 2013, unreleased
TBA	Big House †	Mister Big	Jean-Emmanuel Godart	Filmed in 2015, unreleased
TBA	70 †	Himself	Yann Moix	Documentary; filmed in 2018, unreleased
TBA	Twins †	Bishop Tarcisi	Lamberto Bava	Filmed in 2018, unreleased
TBA	Elle regardait sans plus rien voir †	Volk	Fanny Ardant	

=== Television ===
Date	Title	Role	Director	Notes
1970	Tango	Edek	Jean Kerchbron	Television movie
1970	La pomme de son oeil	Hamid	François Villiers	Television movie
1970	Les aventures de Zadig	Zadig	Claude-Jean Bonnardot	Television movie
1970	Le cyborg ou Le voyage vertical	Gabriel	Jacques Pierre	Television movie
1970	Rendez-vous à Badenberg	Eddy Belmont	Jean-Michel Meurice	Miniseries (9 episodes)
1971	Nausicaa	Book Thief	Agnès Varda	Television movie
1973	L'inconnu	Gérard	Youri	Television movie
1973	Un monsieur bien rangé	Jean-Joseph Jenk	Agnès Delarive	Miniseries (4 episodes)
1973	Les enquêtes du commissaire Maigret	De Greef	Claude Boissol & François Villiers	1 episode
1990	Les Guignols de l'Info	Himself/Cyrano de Bergerac (voice)	Various	1 episode
1998	The Count of Monte Cristo	Edmond Dantès	Josée Dayan	Miniseries
1999	Balzac	Honoré de Balzac	Josée Dayan	Miniseries
2000	Les Misérables	Jean Valjean	Josée Dayan	Miniseries
2000	Bérénice	Titus	Jean-Daniel Verhaeghe	Television movie
2002	Ruy Blas	Don Salluste	Jacques Weber	Television movie
2002	Napoléon	Joseph Fouché	Yves Simoneau	Miniseries
2003	Volpone	Volpone	Frédéric Auburtin	Television movie
2003	Deadly Force	Cannes Police Comissioner	Sergei Snezhkin	3 episodes
2004	The Musketeer Woman	Cardinal Mazarin	Steve Boyum	Miniseries
2005	The Accursed Kings	Jacques de Molay	Josée Dayan	Miniseries
2008	L'abolition	Henry Torrès	Jean-Daniel Verhaeghen	Television movie
2009	Groland Magzine	Frenchman	Various	1 episode
2010	Le grand restaurant	Gérard	Gérard Pullicino	Television movie
2011	Rasputin	Grigori Rasputin	Josée Dayan and Irakli Kvirikadze	Television movie
2013	Le tourbillon de Jeanne	Jacques	Sandrine Veysset	Miniseries (1 Episode)
2014	Zaytsev+1	Zhora	Mikhail Starchak	4 episodes
2015	Capitaine Marleau	Philippe Muir	Josée Dayan	1 episode
2015-2016	A pleines dents	Himself	Sebastien Fallourd & Stéphane Bergouhnioux	Television documentary series, 10 episodes
2016-2018	Marseille	Robert Taro	Florent Emilio Siri, Laïla Marrakchi, ...	16 episodes
2017	Mata Hari	Father Bernard	Dennis Berry, Julius Berg, ...	Miniseries
2022	Diane de Poitiers	Nostradamus	Josée Dayan	Television movie

== Bibliography ==
- "Gérard Depardieu filmography". AllMovie.
- "Gérard Depardieu". UniFrance Films (in French).
