= Ad Vitam (company) =

French film company

- Type: SAS
- Industry: Film
- Founded: 4 January 1998
- Founder: Gregory Gajos; Arthur Hallereau; Alexandra Henochsberg
- Headquarters: 71 rue de la Fontaine-au-Roi, 75011 Paris 11
- Divisions: Ad Vitam Distribution; Ad Vitam Production
- Website: www.advitamdistribution.com

Ad Vitam is a French independent film company headquartered in Paris. It specializes in film distribution, but has since expanded into film production. Since its founding in 1998, Ad Vitam has become one of France's leading independent distribution companies.

== History ==
Ad Vitam was founded in 1998 by Alexandra Henochsberg, Gregory Gajos and Arthur Hallereau. The company distributed its first film on 27 January 1999, La révolution sexuelle n'a pas eu lieu, directed by Judith Cahen.

As of 2015, Ad Vitam had released more than eighty films in French cinemas. According to Gregory Gajos, head of acquisitions, the company's programming is driven by an impulse to "First, choose films that we like, then think about their success".

Ad Vitam is a member of the Syndicat des Distributeurs indépendants réunis européens (DIRE) alongside fourteen other distribution companies, including BAC Films, Capricci, Diaphana, Haut et Court, Le Pacte, Les Films du Losange, Memento Distribution, Pyramide Distribution, Rezo Films, SBS Distribution, The Jokers, UFO Distribution, Wild Bunch Distribution and Zinc.

== Filmography ==
The films distributed by Ad Vitam are:

=== 1990s ===
Ad Vitam films released in the 1990s
Release date (Note: The listed date refers to the film's limited or wide theatrical release in France by Ad Vitam, not necessarily its first screening or when it premiered.)	Title	Director(s)	Notes	Ref.
27 January 1999	La révolution sexuelle n'a pas eu lieu	Judith Cahen		

=== 2000s ===
Ad Vitam films released in the 2000s
Release date	Title	Director(s)	Notes	Ref.
2 February 2000	1999 Madeleine	Laurent Bouhnik		
7 June 2000	Presque rien	Sébastien Lifshitz		
27 December 2000	Laissons Lucie faire !	Emmanuel Mouret		
25 April 2001	So Close to Paradise	Wang Xiaoshuai		
13 June 2001	La Traversée	Sébastien Lifshitz		
7 July 2001	The Attack of the Giant Moussaka	Panos H. Koutras		
29 August 2001	Platform	Jia Zhangke		
7 November 2001	L'Autre Monde	Merzak Allouache		
9 January 2002	La ciénaga	Lucrecia Martel		
27 March 2002	Delbaran	Abolfazl Jalili		
8 May 2002	Memento Mori	Kim Tae-yong and Min Kyu-dong		
26 June 2002	Venus Boyz	Gabriel Baur		
24 July 2002	Maya	Digvijay Singh		
18 September 2002	A Piece of Sky	Bénédicte Liénard		
13 October 2002	La Dernière Lettre	Frederick Wiseman		
22 January 2003	Unknown Pleasures	Jia Zhangke		
12 February 2003	Terra incognita	Ghassan Salhab		
26 February 2003	Un oso rojo	Adrián Caetano		
30 April 2003	Dolls	Takeshi Kitano		
3 December 2003	Bright Future	Kiyoshi Kurosawa		
11 February 2004	S-21: The Khmer Rouge Killing Machine	Rithy Panh		
14 April 2004	Wild Side	Sébastien Lifshitz		
9 June 2004	Tie Xi Qu: West of the Tracks	Wang Bing		
29 September 2004	Social Genocide	Fernando Solanas		
13 October 2004	Aaltra	Benoît Delépine and Gustave Kervern		
24 November 2004	Tropical Malady	Apichatpong Weerasethakul		
12 January 2005	Promised Land	Amos Gitai		
2 March 2005	Darwin's Nightmare	Hubert Sauper		
11 May 2005	Ultranova	Bouli Lanners		
8 June 2005	The World	Jia Zhangke		
13 July 2005	Voici venu le temps	Alain Guiraudie		
26 October 2005	Regular Lovers	Philippe Garrel		
1 February 2006	Sangre	Amat Escalante		
8 March 2006	Sisters in Law	Kim Longinotto and Florence Ayisi		
5 April 2006	Wassup Rockers	Larry Clark		
13 September 2006	Avida	Benoît Delépine and Gustave Kervern		
27 September 2006	The Dignity of the Nobodies	Fernando Solanas		
1 November 2006	Lady Chatterley	Pascale Ferran		
6 December 2006	Offside	Jafar Panahi		
3 January 2007	Le Dernier des fous	Laurent Achard		
7 February 2007	L'Année suivante	Isabelle Czajka		
14 February 2007	Substitute	Fred Poulet and Vikash Dhorasoo		
21 March 2007	La Consultation	Hélène de Crécy		
2 May 2007	Still Life	Jia Zhangke		
4 July 2007	The Bubble	Eytan Fox		
10 October 2007	This Is England	Shane Meadows		
5 December 2007	Rue Santa Fé	Carmen Castillo		
23 January 2008	Night Train	Diao Yinan		
27 February 2008	Foster Child	Brillante Mendoza		
9 April 2008	Disengagement	Amos Gitai		
16 July 2008	Lake Tahoe	Fernando Eimbcke		
1 October 2008	On War	Bertrand Bonello		
29 October 2008	La Vie moderne	Raymond Depardon		
3 December 2008	Lion's Den	Pablo Trapero		
24 December 2008	All Tomorrow's Parties	Yu Lik-wai		
24 December 2008	Louise Hires a Contract Killer	Benoît Delépine and Gustave Kervern		
14 January 2009	Parc	Arnaud des Pallières		
4 February 2009	The Other One	Patrick-Mario Bernard and Pierre Trividic		
18 March 2009	24 City	Jia Zhangke		
15 April 2009	Let's Make Money	Erwin Wagenhofer		
29 April 2009	The Headless Woman	Lucrecia Martel		
10 June 2009	Story of Jen	François Rotger		
29 July 2009	Somers Town	Shane Meadows		
18 November 2009	Vincere	Marco Bellocchio		
9 December 2009	Yuki et Nina	Nobuhiro Suwa and Hippolyte Girardot		
30 December 2009	Going South	Sébastien Lifshitz	Also produced by Ad Vitam	

=== 2010s ===
Ad Vitam films released in the 2010s
Release date	Title	Director(s)	Notes	Ref.
10 February 2010	C'est ici que je vis	Marc Recha		
3 March 2010	Family Tree	Olivier Ducastel and Jacques Martineau		
7 April 2010	Ajami	Scandar Copti and Yaron Shani		
21 April 2010	Mammuth	Benoît Delépine and Gustave Kervern		
23 June 2010	Wandering Streams	Pascal Rabaté		
22 September 2010	I Am Love	Luca Guadagnino		
13 October 2010	Carmel	Amos Gitai		
24 November 2010	Memory Lane	Mikhaël Hers		
15 December 2010	Roses à crédit	Amos Gitai		
19 January 2011	I Wish I Knew	Jia Zhangke		
2 February 2011	Carancho	Pablo Trapero		
2 March 2011	My Wife's Romance	Jamshed Usmonov		
6 April 2011	La nostra vita	Daniele Luchetti		
27 April 2011	Coup d'éclat	José Alcala		
29 June 2011	Holidays by the Sea	Pascal Rabaté		
20 July 2011	The Trip	Michael Winterbottom		
21 September 2011	Twiggy	Emmanuelle Millet		
23 November 2011	Tous au Larzac	Christian Rouaud		
21 December 2011	Hell and Back Again	Danfung Dennis		
28 December 2011	Heavenly Body	Alice Rohrwacher		
4 January 2012	Take Shelter	Jeff Nichols		
8 February 2012	Circumstance	Maryam Keshavarz		
22 February 2012	Bullhead	Michaël R. Roskam		
21 March 2012	Farewell, My Queen	Benoît Jacquot		
2 May 2012	Miss Bala	Gerardo Naranjo		
6 June 2012	Le Grand Soir	Benoît Delépine and Gustave Kervern		
31 October 2012	Les Enfants de la nuit	Caroline Deruas		
31 October 2012	Maddened by His Absence	Sandrine Bonnaire		
28 November 2012	Les Invisibles	Sébastien Lifshitz		
2 January 2013	Confession of a Child of the Century	Sylvie Verheyde		
6 February 2013	Tu honoreras ta mère et ta mère	Brigitte Roüan		
20 February 2013	White Elephant	Pablo Trapero		
20 March 2013	Les Coquillettes	Sophie Letourneur	Also produced by Ad Vitam	
1 May 2013	Mud	Jeff Nichols		
10 July 2013	A Hijacking	Tobias Lindholm		
28 August 2013	Grand Central	Rebecca Zlotowski		
2 October 2013	La Vie domestique	Isabelle Czajka		
30 October 2013	A Castle in Italy	Valeria Bruni Tedeschi		
11 December 2013	A Touch of Sin	Jia Zhangke		
19 February 2014	Gloria	Sebastián Lelio		
5 March 2014	Youth	Tom Shoval		
23 April 2014	Night Moves	Kelly Reichardt		
11 June 2014	Cupcakes	Eytan Fox		
9 July 2014	Du goudron et des plumes	Pascal Rabaté		
16 July 2014	Ablations	Arnold de Parscau		
10 September 2014	Near Death Experience	Benoît Delépine and Gustave Kervern		
5 November 2014	'71	Yann Demange		
19 November 2014	Eden	Mia Hansen-Løve		
10 December 2014	May Allah Bless France!	Abd al Malik	Also produced by Ad Vitam	
24 December 2014	Whiplash	Damien Chazelle		
21 January 2015	Atlit	Shirel Amitaï		
11 February 2015	The Wonders	Alice Rohrwacher		
25 February 2015	À 14 ans	Hélène Zimmer		
18 March 2015	Gente de bien	Franco Lolli		
8 April 2015	The Night Watchman	Pierre Jolivet		
17 June 2015	Mustang	Deniz Gamze Ergüven		
8 July 2015	Difret	Zeresenay Mehari		
22 July 2015	Des Apaches	Nassim Amaouche	Also produced by Ad Vitam	
23 September 2015	Two Friends	Louis Garrel		
14 October 2015	Par accident	Camille Fontaine		
4 November 2015	Son of Saul	László Nemes		
23 December 2015	Mountains May Depart	Jia Zhangke		
13 January 2016	Bang Gang (A Modern Love Story)	Eva Husson		
27 January 2016	45 Years	Andrew Haigh		
10 February 2016	Parisienne	Danielle Arbid		
24 February 2016	Land Legs	Samuel Collardey		
9 March 2016	The Assassin	Hou Hsiao-hsien		
30 March 2016	Good Luck Algeria	Farid Bentoumi		
13 April 2016	Paulina	Santiago Mitre		
8 June 2016	Dark Inclusion	Arthur Harari		
8 June 2016	Peshmerga	Bernard-Henri Lévy		
22 June 2016	Tout de suite maintenant	Pascal Bonitzer		
5 October 2016	Mercenary	Sacha Wolff		
16 November 2016	Planetarium	Rebecca Zlotowski		
28 December 2016	Sweet Dreams	Marco Bellocchio	Also produced by Ad Vitam	
11 January 2017	Jamais contente	Émilie Deleuze	Also produced by Ad Vitam	
25 January 2017	Lumière ! L'aventure commence	Thierry Frémaux		
1 March 2017	Tramontane	Vatche Boulghourjian		
29 March 2017	Pris de court	Emmanuelle Cuau	Also produced by Ad Vitam	
12 April 2017	Smoke & Mirrors	Alberto Rodríguez		
3 May 2017	De toutes mes forces	Chad Chenouga		
12 July 2017	A Fantastic Woman	Sebastián Lelio		
30 August 2017	The Price of Success	Teddy Lussi-Modeste		
13 September 2017	Good Time	Josh Safdie and Benny Safdie		
27 September 2017	Let the Sunshine In	Claire Denis	Also produced by Ad Vitam	
8 November 2017	Until the Birds Return	Karim Moussaoui		
15 November 2017	M	Sara Forestier		
27 December 2017	The Royal Exchange	Marc Dugain	Also produced by Ad Vitam	
31 January 2018	A Season in France	Mahamat-Saleh Haroun		
14 March 2018	Razzia	Nabil Ayouch		
11 April 2018	Kings	Deniz Gamze Ergüven	Also produced by Ad Vitam	
25 April 2018	Lean on Pete	Andrew Haigh		
2 May 2018	Cornélius, le meunier hurlant	Yann Le Quellec		
10 May 2018	Sorry Angel	Christophe Honoré		
30 May 2018	Une année polaire	Samuel Collardey		
11 July 2018	Dark River	Clio Barnard		
5 September 2018	Shéhérazade	Jean-Bernard Marlin		
26 September 2018	I Feel Good	Benoît Delépine and Gustave Kervern		
7 November 2018	Happy as Lazzaro	Alice Rohrwacher	Also produced by Ad Vitam	
5 December 2018	To the Ends of the World	Guillaume Nicloux		
26 December 2018	A Faithful Man	Louis Garrel		
16 January 2019	Non-Fiction	Olivier Assayas		
30 January 2019	The Summer House	Valeria Bruni Tedeschi	Also produced by Ad Vitam	
27 February 2019	Ash Is Purest White	Jia Zhangke		
20 March 2019	Sunset	László Nemes		
24 April 2019	Farewell to the Night	André Téchiné		
8 May 2019	The Dead and the Others	João Salaviza and Renée Nader Messora		
12 June 2019	Zombi Child	Bertrand Bonello		
19 June 2019	The Mustang	Laure de Clermont-Tonnerre		
3 July 2019	So Long, My Son	Wang Xiaoshuai		
28 August 2019	An Easy Girl	Rebecca Zlotowski		
2 October 2019	Atlantics	Mati Diop		
30 October 2019	The Traitor	Marco Bellocchio	Also produced by Ad Vitam	
18 December 2019	Notre dame	Valérie Donzelli		

=== 2020s ===
Ad Vitam films released in the 2020s
Release date	Title	Director(s)	Notes	Ref.
8 January 2020	Un vrai bonhomme	Benjamin Parent		
5 February 2020	Adam	Maryam Touzani		
19 February 2020	Une mère incroyable	Franco Lolli		
22 June 2020	System Crasher	Nora Fingscheidt		
14 July 2020	The Salt of Tears	Philippe Garrel		
29 July 2020	Tijuana Bible	Jean-Charles Hue	Also produced by Ad Vitam	
26 August 2020	Delete History	Benoît Delépine and Gustave Kervern		
9 September 2020	Adolescents	Sébastien Lifshitz		
2 June 2021	Home Front	Lucas Belvaux		
30 June 2021	Sous le ciel d'Alice	Chloé Mazlo		
28 July 2021	Profession du père	Jean-Pierre Améris		
11 August 2021	Rouge	Farid Bentoumi		
25 August 2021	La Terre des hommes	Naël Marandin		
29 September 2021	Eugénie Grandet	Marc Dugain	Also produced by Ad Vitam	
13 October 2021	L'Homme de la cave	Philippe Le Guay		
17 November 2021	Casablanca Beats	Nabil Ayouch		
8 December 2021	Lingui, The Sacred Bonds	Mahamat-Saleh Haroun		
22 December 2021	The Crusade	Louis Garrel		
5 January 2022	My Brothers and I	Yohan Manca	Also produced by Ad Vitam	
26 January 2022	A Radiant Girl	Sandrine Kiberlain		
9 February 2022	Golda Maria	Patrick Sobelman and Hugo Sobelman		
9 March 2022	Softie	Samuel Theis		
16 March 2022	Cinq Nouvelles du cerveau	Jean-Stéphane Bron		
23 March 2022	Nobody Has to Know	Bouli Lanners		
6 April 2022	En même temps	Benoît Delépine and Gustave Kervern	Also produced by Ad Vitam	
13 April 2022	À l'ombre des filles	Étienne Comar		
11 May 2022	Nitram	Justin Kurzel		
27 July 2022	Sundown	Michel Franco		
31 August 2022	Both Sides of the Blade	Claire Denis		
21 September 2022	Other People's Children	Rebecca Zlotowski		
12 October 2022	The Innocent	Louis Garrel		
16 November 2022	Forever Young	Valeria Bruni Tedeschi	Also produced by Ad Vitam	
30 November 2022	Cow	Andrea Arnold		
14 December 2022	Corsage	Marie Kreutzer		
4 January 2023	White Paradise	Guillaume Renusson		
8 February 2023	La Grande Magie	Noémie Lvovsky		
22 March 2023	The Blue Caftan	Maryam Touzani		
12 April 2023	Soul Mates	André Téchiné	Also produced by Ad Vitam	
26 April 2023	Quand tu seras grand	Andréa Bescond and Éric Métayer		
14 June 2023	Stars at Noon	Claire Denis	Also produced by Ad Vitam	
19 July 2023	Les Meutes	Kamal Lazraq		
9 August 2023	Animalia	Sofia Alaoui		
13 September 2023	The Plough	Philippe Garrel		
27 September 2023	The Goldman Case	Cédric Kahn		
1 November 2023	Kidnapped	Marco Bellocchio	Also produced by Ad Vitam	
1 November 2023	Marx Can Wait	Marco Bellocchio		
22 November 2023	All to Play For	Delphine Deloget		
6 December 2023	La chimera	Alice Rohrwacher	Also produced by Ad Vitam	
10 January 2024	Making Of	Cédric Kahn		
24 January 2024	A Good Jewish Boy	Noé Debré		
7 February 2024	The Beast	Bertrand Bonello		
28 February 2024	Madame de Sévigné	Isabelle Brocard	Also produced by Ad Vitam	
13 March 2024	Maria Montessori	Léa Todorov		
27 March 2024	The Good Teacher	Teddy Lussi-Modeste		
10 April 2024	Madame Hofmann	Sébastien Lifshitz		
1 May 2024	The Buriti Flower	João Salaviza and Renée Nader Messora		
21 May 2024	Marcello Mio	Christophe Honoré		
29 May 2024	Salem	Jean-Bernard Marlin		
19 June 2024	Suspended Time	Olivier Assayas		
3 July 2024	Pourquoi tu souris ?	Christine Paillard and Chad Chenouga		
10 July 2024	Le Médium	Emmanuel Laskar		
10 July 2024	Only the River Flows	Wei Shujun		
11 September 2024	Langue étrangère	Claire Burger		
13 November 2024	The Kingdom	Julien Colonna		
18 December 2024	Everybody Loves Touda	Nabil Ayouch		
1 January 2025	Bird	Andrea Arnold	Also produced by Ad Vitam	
8 January 2025	Caught by the Tides	Jia Zhangke		
22 January 2025	The Quiet Son	Delphine Coulin and Muriel Coulin		
12 February 2025	The Mohican	Frédéric Farrucci		
26 February 2025	À bicyclette	Mathias Mlekuz		
19 March 2025	Lumière, l'aventure continue	Thierry Frémaux		
26 March 2025	Je le jure	Samuel Theis		
23 April 2025	Mariana's Room	Emmanuel Finkiel		
7 May 2025	L'Effacement	Karim Moussaoui		
18 June 2025	Enzo	Robin Campillo		
3 September 2025	Fils de	Carlos Abascal Peiró		
22 October 2025	The Little Sister	Hafsia Herzi		
26 November 2025	A Private Life	Rebecca Zlotowski		
10 December 2025	Animal Totem	Benoît Delépine		
17 December 2025	The Secret Agent	Kleber Mendonça Filho		
14 January 2026	Duse	Pietro Marcello	Also produced by Ad Vitam	
11 February 2026	Urchin	Harris Dickinson		
25 February 2026	Calle Málaga	Maryam Touzani		
25 March 2026	Homebound	Neeraj Ghaywan		
8 April 2026	Romería	Carla Simón		
22 April 2026	La Poupée	Sophie Beaulieu		
6 May 2026	Yakushima's Illusion	Naomi Kawase		
3 June 2026	En nous	Juliette Binoche		
17 June 2026	Yakushima's Illusion	Naomi Kawase		
29 July 2026	Le Triangle d'or	Hélène Rosselet-Ruiz		
5 August 2026	Girl	Shu Qi		
2 September 2026	La Frappe	Julien Gaspar-Oliveri		
