= Miss Ming =

French actress, writer and singer

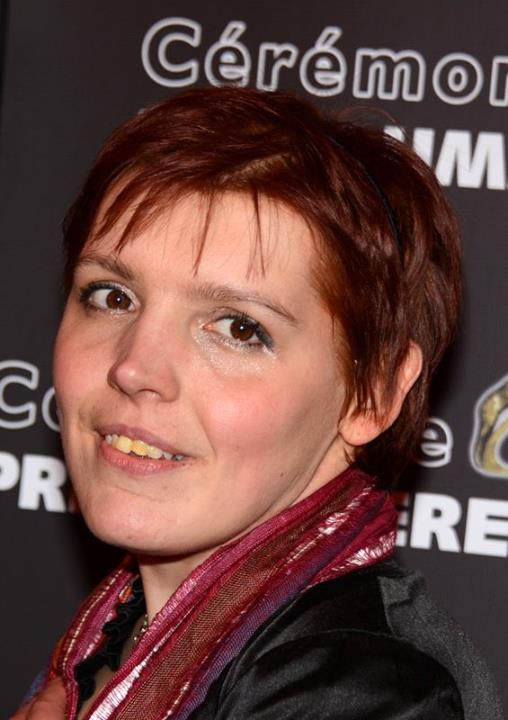
- Miss Ming at the 19th Lumière Awards in 2014
- Born: Candy Ming; 3 November 1990 (age 35); Dieppe, France
- Occupations: Actress, Writer, Singer, Artist
- Years active: 2008–present
- Website: candy-ming.net

Miss Ming (born Candy Ming; 3 November 1990), also known as Candy Rainbow, is a French actress, writer and singer.

== Career ==
She uses the nickname Candy Rainbow when she is a songwriter and the name Miss Ming when she is an actress.

Benoît Delépine met her by chance on a beach while she was reading poetry aloud, wearing home-made clothes. He then starts following her, and eventually introduces her to the world of Groland. Her first book bears the mark of the French satirical tv show.

== Personal life ==
Since 2012, she is married to Frederick Alexander, assistant director of the movie Henri directed by Yolande Moreau.

== Filmography ==
Year	Title	Role	Director	Notes
2008	Louise Hires a Contract Killer	Jennifer	Benoît Delépine & Gustave Kervern	
2010	Mammuth	Solange Pilardosse	Benoît Delépine & Gustave Kervern (2)	
2011	Karminsky-Grad	Fernande	Jean-Jacques Rousseau	
2011	Mon amoureux	Laurie	Daniel Metge	Short; Toronto Worldwide Short Film Festival - Best Performance in a Short
2012	Le grand soir	The cigarette's woman	Benoît Delépine & Gustave Kervern (3)	
2012	Déferlente	Cassiopée	Winifrey Bandera-Guzman & Zoé Delépine	Short; Also writer
2012	Bocuse	Marie	Stéphanie Pillonca & Géraldine Renault	Short
2013	Henri	Rosette	Yolande Moreau	Nominated - Lumière Award for Best Female Revelation
2014	T - La prophétie	The Indian virgin	Dorian Hays & Xavier Tesson	Short
2015	Faut savoir se contenter de beaucoup	Herself	Jean-Henri Meunier	
2015	L'hermine	Jessica Burton	Christian Vincent	
2016	Le Mari de mon mari	a young	Charles Nemes	
2017	Chez nous	the handicapped woman	Lucas Belvaux	
2018	Marc-Antoine	the voice in the room	Augustin Vaugeois	
2019	No Men	la révoltée	Jean-Henri Meunier	
2019	La Forêt de mon père	la patiente en HP	Vero Cratzborn	
2020	À l'Ouest	Candy Blondel	Cédric Tanguy]] et Nicolas Bellomchambre	
2020	La Tête cachetonnée	The fortune teller	Jean-Henri Meunier	
2020	Nos intentions fébriles	The revolutionary of the heart	Jean-Henri Meunier	
2020	Effacer l'historique	La guichetière de la Poste	Benoît Delépine et Gustave Kervern	
2020	L'Esclave du temps	herself	Gérard Courant	
2023	Captives	Kenavo	Arnaud des Pallières	
2024	My Everything	Servant	Anne-Sophie Bailly	
