= Delete History =

2020 film

- French theatrical release poster
- Directed by: Benoît Delépine; Gustave Kervern
- Screenplay by: Benoît Delépine; Gustave Kervern
- Produced by: Sylvie Pialat; Benoît Quainon; Benoît Delépine; Gustave Kervern
- Starring: Blanche Gardin; Denis Podalydès; Corinne Masiero
- Cinematography: Hugues Poulain
- Edited by: Stéphane Elmadjian
- Production companies: Les Films du Worso; No Money Productions; France 3 Cinéma; Pictanovo; Scope Pictures
- Distributed by: Ad Vitam Distribution
- Release dates: 24 February 2020 (Berlinale); 26 August 2020 (France)
- Running time: 110 minutes
- Countries: France; Belgium
- Language: French
- Budget: $4.9 million
- Box office: $4.4 million

Delete History (French: Effacer l'historique) is a 2020 comedy film co-produced, written and directed by Benoît Delépine and Gustave Kervern. It was selected to compete for the Golden Bear in the main competition section at the 70th Berlin International Film Festival. At Berlin, the film won the Silver Bear 70th Berlinale prize. The film is also scheduled to show at the 2020 Angoulême Francophone Film Festival.

== Cast ==
- Blanche Gardin as Marie
- Denis Podalydès as Bertrand
- Corinne Masiero as Christine
- Vincent Lacoste as sex taper
- Benoît Poelvoorde as delivery man
- Bouli Lanners as Dieu
- Vincent Dedienne as organic farmer
- Philippe Rebbot as lazy man
- Michel Houellebecq as suicidal client
- Clémentine Peyricot as Cathya
- Lucas Mondher as Sylvain
- Jackie Berroyer as picky neighbor
- Denis O'Hare as American millionnaire
- Gustave Kervern as The other dodo

== Post production ==
Yolande Moreau's scene was cut out from the film. She is a frequent collaborator of the directors.

== Reception ==
In France, the film averages 4/5 on the AlloCiné from 31 press reviews. On the review aggregator website Rotten Tomatoes, 80% of 5 critics' reviews are positive.
