= Velvet D'Amour =

American plus-size model (born 1967)

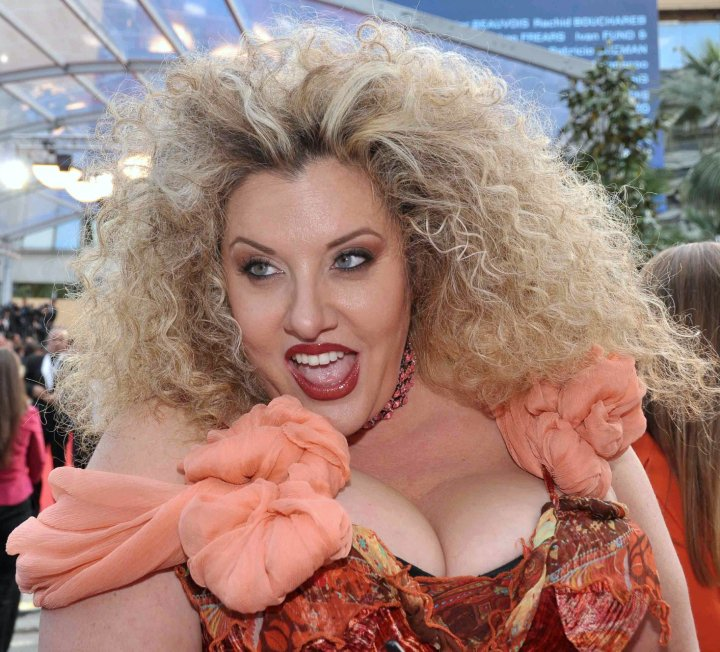
- D'Amour at the 2010 Cannes Film Festival
- Born: Velvet d'Amour; May 27, 1967 (age 59); Rochester, New York, U.S.

Velvet d'Amour (born May 27, 1967) is an American plus-size model and fashion photographer. She is best known via the worldwide media coverage she received after her appearance in Jean-Paul Gaultier's 2007 Spring/Summer prêt-à-porter collection shown in Paris in 2006. Standing at 5 ft 8 in (1.73 m) and weighing 300 lb (140 kg), she made a catwalk appearance in John Galliano's prêt-à-porter showing entitled "Everybody Is Beautiful" in 2006, and in the associated French Vogue article featuring photography by Nick Knight.

In response to the skinny model debate, D'Amour commented, "The general reason one gets as to why there is not more representation of curvier folks within modern media is that inclusion would be equivalent to acceptance, and acceptance would then equal condoning, which would mean they support alleged ill health. The odd dichotomy is that whilst people like myself are banned due to the purported notion we will somehow 'promote' being unhealthy, we are besieged with media saturated with imagery of Britney Spears, Nicole Richie, Paris Hilton, Kate Moss and Lindsay Lohan. How these women represent good health is somewhat beyond me."

D'Amour's appearance on the catwalk was widely regarded as a response by Gaultier to the international model health debate, although D'Amour is quoted in many interviews stating that Gaultier's intentions were honest. He was in fact, casting his 30-year retrospective and thus he was harkening back to previous collections where he had already incorporated plus size models, which is how she was cast in the first place.

D'Amour featured in the title role of Avida, the 2006 French film directed by Benoît Delépine and Gustave Kervern, and produced by Mathieu Kassovitz, which was selected for the 2006 Cannes and 2007 Tribeca film festivals amongst others and has been purchased by Cinema Epoch for US distribution. In 2010, she participated in the French TV show : "La Ferme Célébrités en Afrique" She has also launched a magazine called Vol-Up-2 that features her photography as well as other photographers and artists. As D'Amour experienced success as a plus model, she subsequently photographed many plus models for Vol-Up-2, such as rising plus model Clementine Desseaux.
