= Joseph Plateau Awards 2005 =

19th Joseph Plateau Awards

March 7, 2006

Best Film:
The Child

The 19th Annual Joseph Plateau Awards, given on 7 March 2006, honoured the best Belgian filmmaking of 2005.

This year, L'enfant (The Child) of the brothers Dardenne won the "Big 5" (the five biggest prizes): Best Film, Actor, Actress, Director and Screenplay.

== Winners and nominees ==
=== Best Belgian Actor ===
Jérémie Renier - The Child (L'enfant)

- Benoît Poelvoorde - Entre ses mains
- Koen De Bouw - The Intruder (De indringer) and Elongated Weekend (Verlengd weekend)

=== Best Belgian Actress ===
Déborah François - The Child (L'enfant)

- Marie du Bled - Ultranova
- Karlijn Sileghem - Suspect

=== Best Belgian Cinematography ===
The Wedding Party (Die Bluthochzeit) - Danny Elsen

- Bunder paradise and Ultranova
- The Ordeal (Calvaire)

=== Best Belgian Composer ===
George Van Dam - Friday or Another Day (Vendredi ou un autre jour)

- Jan Leyers - Gilles (Buitenspel)
- Casimir Liberski - Bunder paradise

=== Best Belgian Director ===
Jean-Pierre and Luc Dardenne - The Child (L'enfant)

- Bouli Lanners - Ultranova
- Frien Troch - Someone Else's Happiness (Een ander zijn geluk)

=== Best Belgian Film ===
The Child (L'enfant)

- The Sleeping Child (L'enfant endormi)
- Someone Else's Happiness (Een ander zijn geluk)

=== Best Belgian Screenplay ===
The Child (L'enfant) - Jean-Pierre and Luc Dardenne

- Someone Else's Happiness (Een ander zijn geluk) - Fien Troch
- Duplicity (Trouble) - Harry Cleven

=== Best Belgian Short Film ===
Forever

- Love's Lost and Happiness
- The One Thing to Do (Une seule chose à faire)
- The Sunflyers

=== Box Office Award ===
Buitenspel
