= Jean-Jacques Rousseau (director) =

Belgian absurdist independent film director

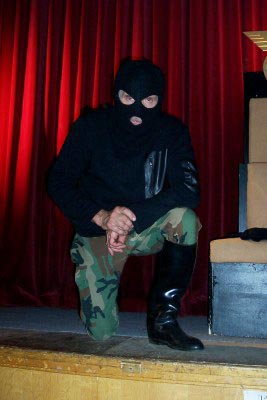
Jean-Jacques Rousseau, Belgian absurdist film director

Jean-Jacques Rousseau (December 16, 1946 – November 5, 2014) was a Belgian absurdist independent film director. He was born in Souvret, Belgium (Courcelles) and died in Montigny-le-Tilleul. He shot his films with very small budgets (€2000 to 2500 per film) and used unknown or non-professional actors. He called himself the director of the absurd and always fiercely protected his anonymity by masking his face during his public appearances. He shot over 50 films making him one of Belgium's most prolific film directors.

His life was supposed to be the subject of a Yann Moix film, called Palme d'or, starring Benoît Poelvoorde. The project was not filmed. Moix did make, without Poelvoorde, the disastrous Cinéman. Frédéric Sojcher's film Cinéastes à tout prix, also known as Born to Film, was selected and shown at the Cannes Film Festival in 2004, is dedicated to Rousseau's work as well as Max Naveaux's and Jacques Hardy's. It stars the actors Bouli Lanners and Benoît Poelvoorde.

Rousseau's first few films were fairly conventional examples of the fantasy genre. However, some of them won regional awards in the 1970s (people's choice, best screenplay). A semi-permanent lack of financial resources prevented him from making technically accomplished films. However, he financed, edited, directed and acted in most of them. He was also known for carrying a gun on set and sometimes firing it to get the actors' attention.

Having a fertile imagination fueled by esoteric tastes in books, his films shunned the mainstream more and more, thus becoming marginalized. He never received subsidies to finance his films. Patrick Moriau, a Belgian politician, stated once that "If one asked me to allocate part of the Walloon Community's finances to the Committee for Film Selection, the money would undoubtedly never go into Rousseau's pockets. He may be a kind man, but his films are frankly wild and scare people."

On the evening of July 15, 2014 after an altercation outside a café between two men, he was run over by a car driven by one of the men and remained in a coma until his death later that year on November 5.

== Filmography ==
- Igor Yaboutich (1964)
- Le Poignard maudit (1965)
- Les Malfaiteurs (1966)
- La Vallée de la Sûre (1966)
- L'Abstrait (1968)
- Le Cauchemar (1969)
- Germaine Grandieu (1972)
- Les Compagnons de justice (1974)
- Le Reposoir (1975)
- Les Immortels (1975)
- Catalepsie (1976)
- L'étoile du mal (1977)
- Dossier Réincarnation (1977)
- Les Marcheurs de la grande armée (1978)
- The Diabolical Dr. Flak (1978)
- L'histoire du cinéma 16 (1983)
- Cannes année européenne du cinéma (1988)
- Ciné effet (1988)
- Massacre au pied de biche
- Les Incubes d'Escargnole
- Xeno-Zenit
- Furor Teutonicus (1999)
- Road Movie (2001)
- Wallonie 2084 (2003)
- Irkutz 88 (2004)
- La Revanche du sacristain cannibale (2004)
- Le Chasseur de succubes (2005)
- La mécanique du rasoir (2006)
- L'invasion des succubes (2006)
- Rock Mendès (2007)
- Le Retour du Docteur Loiseau (2008)
- Un colonial chez les Celtes (2011)
- Karminsky-Grad (2011)
- L'amputeur wallon (2011)
- 1er juillet chez Olga (2011)
- Le Couturier (2014)
- Docteur Loiseau : la solution finale (2014)
