= Aaltra =

- Film poster
- Directed by: Gustave de Kervern; Benoît Delépine
- Written by: Gustave de Kervern; Benoît Delépine
- Produced by: Guillaume Malandrin; Vincent Tavier
- Starring: Benoît Delépine; Gustave de Kervern; Michel de Gavre; Gérard Condejean
- Cinematography: Hugues Poulain
- Edited by: Anne-Laure Guégan
- Music by: Les Wampas
- Production companies: La Parti Productions; Moviestream; OF2B Productions
- Distributed by: Ad Vitam Distribution (France)
- Release date: 13 May 2004 (France)
- Running time: 92 minutes
- Countries: Belgium; France
- Languages: French; English; Finnish; German; Dutch

Aaltra is a 2004 Belgian French-language deadpan black comedy film directed and written by Gustave de Kervern and Benoît Delépine. The film won four awards and was nominated for three others.

== Plot ==
Benoit Delepine plays a harassed businessman who, frazzled by commuting to his office, is working from home against company rules. While arguing with a jobbing farmworker (Gustave Kervern), whose tractor is spraying herbicide into his garden he is summoned to the office by his angry bosses. However, his car becomes stuck behind the tractor. The farmworker will not let him pass, resulting in the businessman missing the train and losing his job. Frustrated, he seeks out the farmworker and assaults him.

The two wake up in hospital, having been crushed by a malfunctioning farm machine as they struggled. They are now wheelchair users and both set out for Finland to seek out the eponymous farm machine manufacturer to demand compensation.

== Cast ==
- Benoît Delépine as The Employee
- Gustave Kervern as The Farm Worker
- Michel de Gavre as Farmer
- Benoît Poelvoorde as Motocross Spectator
- Bouli Lanners as The Finnish singer
- Gérard Condejean as The Chinese
- Isabelle Delépine as Wife

== Accolades ==
=== Won ===
- London Film Festival 2004
  - FIPRESCI Prize - Benoît Delépine and Gustave de Kervern
- Puchon International Fantastic Film Festival 2004
  - Best Actor - Benoît Delépine and Gustave de Kervern
- Transilvania International Film Festival 2004
  - Audience Award - Benoît Delépine and Gustave de Kervern
- Joseph Plateau Awards 2005
  - Best Belgian Actor - Benoît Poelvoorde

=== Nominations ===
- Copenhagen International Film Festival 2004
  - Golden Swan Award - Benoît Delépine
- Rotterdam International Film Festival 2004
  - Tiger Award - Benoît Delépine and Gustave de Kervern
- Joseph Plateau Awards 2005
  - Best Belgian Film

== See also ==
- Valtra
