= En même temps =

2022 French comedy film

- Directed by: Benoît Delépine; Gustave Kervern
- Screenplay by: Benoît Delépine; Gustave Kervern
- Produced by: Alexandra Henochsberg; Benoît Delépine; Gustave Kervern
- Starring: Vincent Macaigne; Jonathan Cohen; India Hair; Jehnny Beth; Doully Millet
- Cinematography: Hugues Poulain
- Edited by: Stéphane Elmadjian
- Production companies: Ad Vitam Production; No Money Productions
- Distributed by: Ad Vitam Distribution
- Release date: 6 April 2022
- Running time: 108 minutes
- Country: France
- Language: French
- Budget: $3.2 million
- Box office: $895.000

En même temps is a 2022 French comedy film produced, written, and directed by Benoît Delépine and Gustave Kervern. It is the tenth film directed by the duo together and was considered a commercial failure.

== Synopsis ==
The mayors of two small French towns, from opposing political sides, are glued together by a feminist activist. The forced proximity compels the two men to reconcile their differing views on economic development and ecology.

== Cast ==
- Vincent Macaigne as Pascal Molitor
- Jonathan Cohen as Didier Béquet
- India Hair as Elise / Sandra
- Jehnny Beth as Nina
- Doully Millet as Frida
- Yolande Moreau as Madame Bianca
- Hakim Amokrane as Moktar
- Charlotte Creyx as Mireille
- Gustave Kervern as The restaurant owner
- Isabelle Gaspar as Cindy
- Laetitia Dosch as Sylvie
- François Damiens as The diner owner
- Ovidie as Clémence
- Benoît Delépine as The photographer
- Anna Mouglalis as Madame Béquet
- Anne Benoît as Molitor's mother

== Production ==
=== Pre-production ===
The film's original title was Union nationale ("National Union"), but was considered to be too militaristic. The title was subsequently changed to En même temps ("At the Same Time"), a phrase notably used by French president Emmanuel Macron during his 2017 presidential campaign and his subsequent presidency.

Keveren stated that politicians embody what it means to be human in the modern world, comparing them to circus performers who must juggle plates to prevent them from falling. While he believes this is what people do to avoid catastrophe, a politician who follows this principle is "guaranteed to run straight into a wall".

Deléphine stated that this title is both contemporary, as it could be seen as a criticism of Macronism, and timeless, expressing the difficulty of satisfying everyone and making genuine political choices.

=== Filming ===
Filming took place over a month in Occitania in 2021, with the aim of releasing the film in time for the 2022 French presential election.

== Box office ==
After the film's release in France, the film attracted 16,346 admissions on its first day of screening, including 5,309 from previews, across 412 copies. It ranked behind the comedies Qu'est-ce qu'on a tous fait au bon Dieu? (173,251) and The Bad Guys (62,087), but ahead of the Spanish horror film The Grandmother (9,405). By the end of its first week, the film achieved 75,421 admissions, placing seventh behind The Batman (93,306) and ahead of Notre-Dame on Fire (69,163). With 125,642 admissions over six weeks, the film earned just over €670,000 against a budget of €2.9 million.

== Critical reception ==
Despite the film's lack of success at the box office, it was generally well received by critics, such as Le Parisien, L'Humanité, and Marianne, and earned a cumulative rating of 3.4/5 stars from AlloCiné.

However, some reviews were more critical, such as that of French film magazine Première, which gave the film a one-star rating, criticising its directors and two leading actors, claiming that the film is "best forgotten".
