= Ablations =

- Film poster
- Directed by: Arnold de Parscau
- Written by: Benoît Delépine
- Produced by: Benoît Delépine; Jean-Pierre Guérin; Serge de Poucques; Sylvain Goldberg; Adrian Politowski; Gilles Waterkeyn; Nadia Khamlichi
- Starring: Denis Ménochet; Virginie Ledoyen; Yolande Moreau; Florence Thomassin; Philippe Nahon
- Cinematography: François Catonné
- Edited by: Pascale Chavance
- Music by: Matthieu Gonet
- Production companies: JPG Films; No Money Productions
- Distributed by: Ad Vitam Distribution
- Release date: 16 July 2014
- Running time: 94 minutes
- Countries: France; Belgium
- Language: French
- Box office: $85.000

Ablations is a 2014 French-Belgian drama film directed by Arnold de Parscau.

== Plot ==
A man wakes up in a wasteland, with no memory of the night before, a lower back scar. A former mistress, surgeon, tells him that stole a kidney. Obsessed with this flight, he will sacrifice everything to find him: his family, his job ... to go crazy.

== Cast ==
- Denis Ménochet as Pastor Cartalas
- Virginie Ledoyen as Léa Cartalas
- Florence Thomassin as Anna
- Philippe Nahon as Wortz
- Yolande Moreau as Wortz's Assistant
- Serge Riaboukine as Jean-Michel Poncreux
- Lily-Rose Miot as Juli
- Lika Minamoto as Mikako
- Antoine Coesens as Patrice
- Louane Gonçalves Santos as Miguel
- Luka Breidigan Campana as Bruno
- Philippe Rebbot as The veterinary

== Release ==
The film was presented at the Festival international du film fantastique de Gérardmer, the Champs-Élysées Film Festival and at the Chicago International Film Festival.
