= I Feel Good (film) =

- Directed by: Benoît Delépine; Gustave de Kervern
- Written by: Benoît Delépine; Gustave de Kervern
- Produced by: Benoît Delépine; Marc Dujardin; Gustave de Kervern
- Starring: Jean Dujardin; Yolande Moreau
- Cinematography: Hugues Poulain
- Edited by: Stéphane Elmadjian
- Music by: Hakim Amokrane; Mustapha Amokrane; Nicolas Liorit; Motivés; Ghislain Rivera
- Production companies: Arte; Wild Bunch; No Money Productions
- Distributed by: Ad Vitam
- Release dates: 11 August 2018 (Locarno); 26 September 2018
- Countries: France; Belgium; Germany; USA
- Language: French
- Budget: $4.8 million
- Box office: $4 million

I Feel Good is a 2018 French comedy satire directed by Benoît Delépine and Gustave de Kervern.

== Plot ==
Jacques is an ambitious man pushed from the home by his old parents. One day he decides one day become rich and famous by exploiting the vein of low cost cosmetic surgery in Eastern Europe. To develop his business plan, he takes refuge with his sister Monique, director of an Emmaus village. Lying to her about giving them a better future, he will eventually take a whole group of companions to a clinic in Bulgaria, to come back with cosmetic surgery done.

== Cast ==
- Jean Dujardin as Jacques Pora
- Yolande Moreau as Monique Pora
- Jean-Benoît Ugeux as Vincent

== Production ==
Principal photography on the film began in August 2017 in Pyrénées-Atlantiques. It took place in the Emmaus village in Lescar. Other filming sessions took place in Pau, around the funiculaire and the city centre, as well as in Tarbes (Hautes-Pyrénées). Sequences were shot in Romania at Nicolae Ceaușescu's Palace of the Parliament and in Bulgaria at the Buzludzha Monument.
