= Groland =

Fictive country

- First appearance: Ce soir avec les nouveaux
- Created by: Benoît Delépine; Christian Borde; Christophe Salengro
- Genre: Satire

In-universe information
- Other names: GRD; Présipauté de Groland
- Type: Fictional country

Groland (French pronunciation: [ɡʁolɑ̃d], [ɡʁɔlɑ̃d]; GRD) or the Présipauté du Groland is a fictional country that is the setting for a series of mockumentary television shows and films. It is a micro-state at an undisclosed location, created as a satire of France and European microstates by Benoît Delépine, Christian Borde and Christophe Salengro. Groland was first depicted in 1992 on Ce soir avec les Nouveaux, broadcast by Canal+ in France.

== Development ==
A writer for the Canal+ satirical news program Les Guignols de L'Info, Benoît Delépine created the concept of Salengroland around 1990 with Christophe Salengro, drawing from the presidency of Charles de Gaulle. In 1992, Delépine joined the writing team of Ce soir avec les nouveaux, a sketch comedy program. The co-writer on the show, Christian Borde, helped further develop the concept through his experiences of living in Andorra and Monaco.

== Appearances ==
=== Sketch series ===
Groland first appeared as the setting of a recurring sketch called Les Nouvelles ("The News") on Ce soir avec les nouveaux in 1992, broadcast by Canal+ in France. Although Ce soir avec les Nouveaux was not renewed in 1993, Delépine, Salengro and Borde joined Nulle Part Ailleurs on the same channel where they continued to produce sketches as part of a recurring series from 1993 to 2001 called Les Nouvelles Neuves ("The New News"), later renamed CANAL International, then 20H20.

=== Stand-alone news program ===
Since 2001, Groland is the setting of a stand-alone satirical news broadcast on Canal+, expanding and continuing the sketch series. They are broadcast on Canal+ internationally, as well as on Be 1 in Belgium and Luxembourg.

Launched as Groland Sat, a weekly program, over the years it has changed names multiple times and is currently broadcast daily as Groland le Zapoï.

=== Films ===
Michael Kael contre la World News Company ("Michael Kael versus the World News Company") is a French film directed by Christophe Smith, released in 1998. In it, Delépine and Borde reprise roles created as part of the sketch series, respectively reporter Michael Kael and news presenter Jules-Édouard Moustic.

Groland, Le Gros Métrage ("Groland, The Big Show") is a French telefilm by Benoît Delépine and Christian Borde, broadcast 19 December 2015 on Canal+

=== Books ===
- Le Guide du Groland: Pays joyeux, accueillant, et lâche ("The Guide to Groland: A happy, welcoming and cowardly country") by Jules-Édouard Moustic, Michael Kael et Francis Kuntz, 1999, Michel Lafon
- Groland l'Almanache 2012 by Pierre Siankowski, 2011, Éditions de l'Amphore
- Les 20 ans de Groland: Le livre inédit de 128 pages de l'exposition Gromiam ("20 years of Groland: The unprecedented 128-page book of the Gromiam exposition") by Christophe Salengro, Jules-Édouard Moustic, Michael Kael et Francis Kuntz, 2012, Ipanema
- Grolivre – L’album souvenir de Groland ("Grobook – The souvenir album from Groland") by Christian Borde, Franck Benoist, Jean-François Halin, Benoît Delépine et Team, 2019, Hugo Desinge
