= Louise Hires a Contract Killer =

- Film poster
- Directed by: Gustave Kervern; Benoît Delépine
- Written by: Gustave de Kervern; Benoît Delépine
- Produced by: Benoît Jaubert; Mathieu Kassovitz
- Starring: Yolande Moreau; Bouli Lanners
- Cinematography: Hugues Poulain
- Music by: Gaëtan Roussel
- Production companies: No Money Productions; MNP Entreprise
- Distributed by: Ad Vitam Distribution
- Release date: 23 September 2008
- Running time: 94 minutes
- Country: France
- Language: French
- Budget: $2.2 million
- Box office: $5 million

Louise Hires a Contract Killer (French: Louise-Michel) is a 2008 French comedy film written and directed by Gustave de Kervern and Benoît Delépine. The film won the Prix Jacques Prévert du Scénario for Best Original Screenplay in 2009.

== Cast ==
- Yolande Moreau as Louise Ferrand
- Bouli Lanners as Michel Pinchon
- Benoît Poelvoorde as Guy
- Albert Dupontel as Miro
- Miss Ming as Jennifer
- Catherine Hosmalin as Madame Pinchon
- Francis Kuntz as Frambard
- Philippe Katerine as The singer
- Gustave Kervern as The ship's captain

== Production ==
Filming locations included Amiens, L'Étoile and Quend in the Somme department, but also Guise in Aisne.

== Critical reception ==
The film was well received by the critics. Review aggregator Rotten Tomatoes reports that 81% of 16 critics gave the film a positive review, for an average rating of 6.4/10.
