= Michael Kael contre la World News Company =

1998 French comedy film

- Directed by: Christophe Smith
- Written by: Benoît Delépine
- Produced by: Alain Bourboulon; Frédéric Bourboulon; Alain Sarde
- Cinematography: Pascal Gennesseaux
- Edited by: Véronique Parnet
- Music by: 109 international
- Distributed by: BAC Films
- Release date: 18 February 1998 (France)
- Running time: 90 minutes
- Country: France
- Language: French
- Budget: $9 million

Michael Kael contre la World News Company is a 1998 French comedy film by Christophe Smith, starring Benoît Delépine, Marine Delterme, Victoria Principal, William Atherton, Féodor Atkine, Yves Jacques, Alix de Konopka, Michael Morris, Luc Bernard, Paul Van Mulder, and Jules-Édouard Moustic.

== Cast ==
- Benoît Delépine : Michael Kael
- Féodor Atkine : Major Sylvain
- Marine Delterme : Paola Maertens
- Victoria Principal : Leila Parker
- Elliott Gould : Coogan
- William Atherton : James Denit
- Mickey Rooney : Griffith
- Yves Jacques : Charles Robert
- Alix de Konopka : Miss Picotte
- Michael Morris : Robert Kipp
- Jules-Édouard Moustic (Moustic)
