= Substitute (film) =

- Directed by: Vikash Dhorasoo; Fred Poulet
- Written by: Vikash Dhorasoo; Fred Poulet
- Produced by: Nicolas Brevière; Pierre Walfisz
- Starring: Vikash Dhorasoo; Grégory Coupet; Mickaël Landreau; Fred Poulet; William Gallas; Gaël Givet; Sidney Govou; Thierry Henry; Lillian Thuram; David Trezeguet; Zinedine Zidane
- Distributed by: Ad Vitam Distribution
- Release dates: 27 November 2006 (Belfort Entrevues Film Festival); 14 February 2007 (France)
- Running time: 70 minutes
- Country: France
- Language: French

Substitute is a film by the French former footballer Vikash Dhorasoo. Filmed before and during the 2006 FIFA World Cup, Dhorasoo "recorded his thoughts and feelings throughout the tournament", resulting in a "deeply unconventional sporting film".
