= Kill Me Please (2010 film) =

- Theatrical release poster
- Directed by: Olias Barco
- Written by: Gustave de Kervern; Benoît Delépine
- Starring: Aurélien Recoing; Benoît Poelvoorde
- Cinematography: Frédéric Noirhomme
- Music by: Thomas Berliner
- Release date: 3 November 2010
- Running time: 95 minutes
- Country: France
- Language: French
- Box office: $58.000

Kill Me Please is a 2010 comedy film directed by Olias Barco.

== Plot ==
Dr Kruger runs a clinic for rich patients who want to die. If they convince him that they might have a reason for suicide he assists them.

== Cast ==
- Aurélien Recoing as Docteur Kruger
- Benoît Poelvoorde as Monsieur Demanet
- Bouli Lanners as Monsieur Vidal
- Philippe Nahon as Monsieur Antoine
- Virginie Efira as Inspector Evrard
- Virgile Bramly as Virgile
