= Henri (2013 film) =

2013 film

- Directed by: Yolande Moreau
- Written by: Yolande Moreau
- Produced by: Julie Salvador; Jacques-Henri Bronckart; Olivier Bronckart; Christophe Jeauffroy; Jean-Louis Livi; Antonino Lombardo; Arlette Zylberberg
- Starring: Pippo Delbono; Miss Ming
- Cinematography: Philippe Guilbert
- Edited by: Fabrice Rouaud
- Release dates: 24 May 2013 (Cannes); 4 December 2013 (France)
- Running time: 103 minutes
- Countries: Belgium; France
- Language: French
- Budget: $5.6 million
- Box office: $1.1 million

Henri is a 2013 Franco-Belgian drama film directed by Yolande Moreau. It was screened in the Directors' Fortnight section at the 2013 Cannes Film Festival. The film received four nominations at the 5th Magritte Awards, including Best Film and Best Director for Yolande Moreau.

== Cast ==
- Pippo Delbono as Henri Salvatore
- Miss Ming as Rosette
- Jackie Berroyer as Bibi
- Simon André as René
- Lio as Rita
- Gwen Berrou as Laetitia
- Yolande Moreau as Aunt Michèle
- Philippe Duquesne as Jean-Lou
- Isabelle de Hertogh as Laetitia's friend
- Brigitte Mariaulle as Madame Monnier
- Renaud Rutten as Roland
- Pascal Demolon as Jean-Pierre
- Noël Godin as The pigeon friend
- Wim Willaert as The cop
