= Benoît Poelvoorde =

Belgian actor and comedian

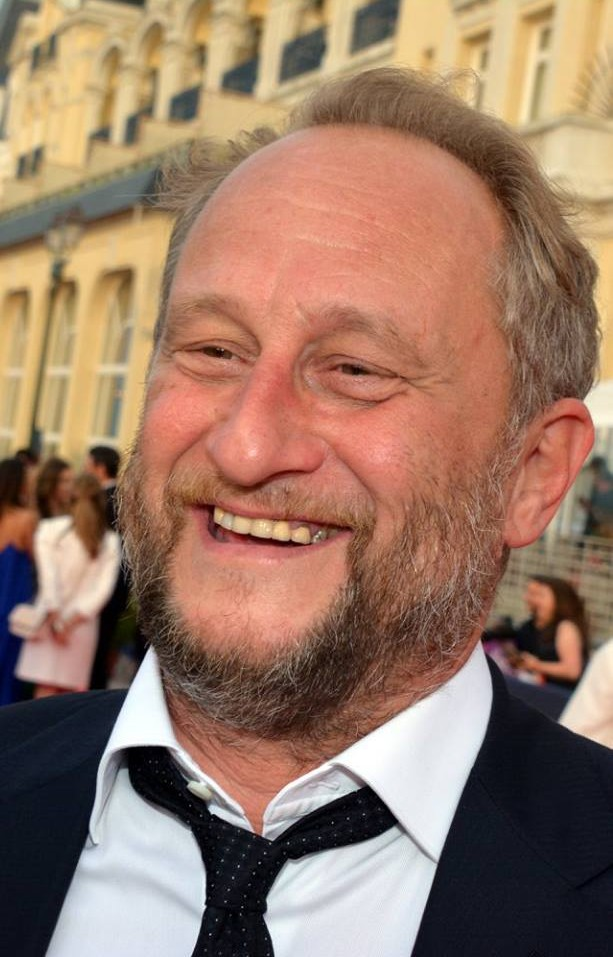
- Benoît Poelvoorde at Cabourg Film Festival in 2018
- Born: 22 September 1964 (age 61); Namur, Belgium
- Occupations: Actor; screenwriter; director; producer; comedian
- Years active: 1983–present

Benoît Poelvoorde (French: [bənwa pulvɔʁd], Flemish: [bəˈnʋaː pulˈvoːrdə]; born 22 September 1964) is a Belgian actor and comedian.

== Early life ==
His mother was a grocer, and his father a truck driver who died when Poelvoorde was still a child. He attended the Jesuit Boarding School of Godinne before he left home at 17 to take classes at the Félicien Rops Technical Institute in Namur (Belgium) where he met Rémy Belvaux. He developed a passion for theater and became noted for his atypical interpretations. Not only was he destined to become a draughtsman, he also developed professionally as a photographer. During his graphic design studies at the École de recherche graphique in Brussels, he also became friends with André Bonzel and, together with Rémy Belvaux, directed in 1988 Pas de C4 pour Daniel Daniel, his first movie, a student short film (which he co-directed and co-wrote). It was a stylized trailer for a mock-spy film.

== Career ==
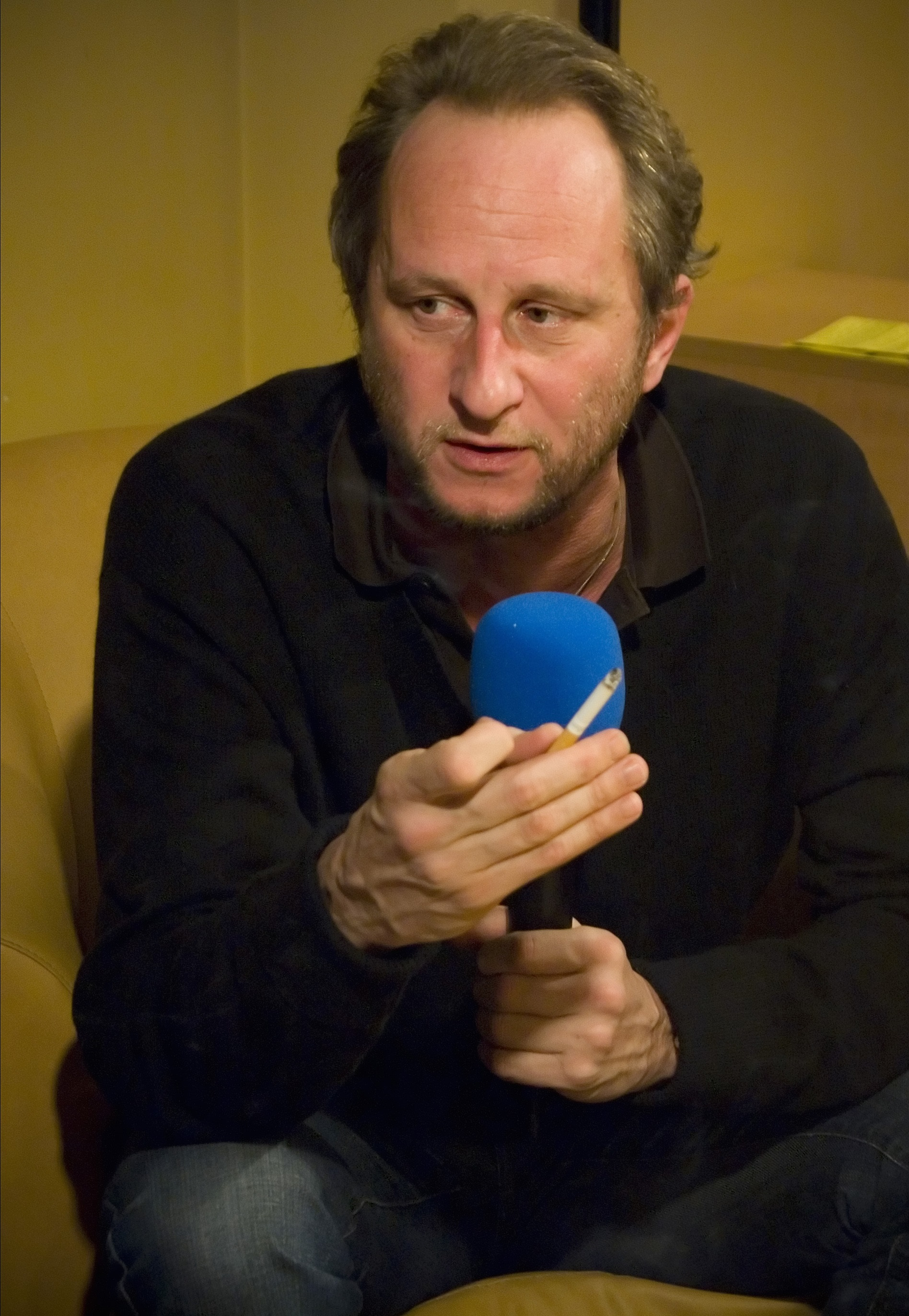
Benoît Poelvoorde in 2007

In 1992, Poelvoorde, Belvaux and Bonzel wrote, produced and directed together their first long feature C'est arrivé près de chez vous (Man Bites Dog internationally) originally a low-budget school graduation project (1992) and a kind of cynical satirical "noir" movie, inspired from the famous Belgian series "Strip-Tease" which went on to become a critically acclaimed cult movie. The film received the André Cavens Award for Best Film by the Belgian Film Critics Association (UCC).

Poelvoorde subsequently starred in two series on the French pay-channel Canal+ and several movies such as Les Randonneurs, Le Boulet and Podium, which made him famous in France and Belgium. In 2001, he starred in Le Vélo de Ghislain Lambert, a movie about one of his passions, bicycling. In 2002, he received the Prix Jean Gabin, which recognized the most hopeful young talents. Poelvoorde became a member of the Cannes Film Festival jury in 2004 by request of Quentin Tarantino, a big fan of Man Bites Dog who presided over the jury that year.

In 2005 he ranked in 7th place in the Walloon version of the Greatest Belgian. In the Flemish version he came in at no. 400 outside the official list of nominations.

In 2008, his performance in the movie Astérix aux jeux olympiques won him critical acclaim by both film critics and the public at large. His recurrent character as a pretentious person and a sore loser has drawn comparisons between him and the French comedian Louis de Funès. Poelvoorde also played serious roles. He has as Etienne Balsan in Coco avant Chanel by Anne Fontaine in 2009 , with Audrey Tautou; as Jean-René in 2010 with Isabelle Carré in a comedy by Jean-Pierre Améris Les Émotifs anonymes about two extremely shy persons who fall in love, and also as August Maquet in L'autre Dumas by Safy Nebbou, alongside Gérard Depardieu and Dominique Blanc, a movie about the creative ghostwriter, Maquet, who played a crucial role in the production of French writer Alexandre Dumas' Three Musketeers. For his work in A Place on Earth (2013), Poelvoorde received a Magritte Award for Best Actor.

He played God in the satirical movie The Brand New Testament (2015).

== Personal life ==
In November 2008, the actor suffered from depression and was briefly hospitalized at his request in the psychiatric unit of the CHR of Namur. The actor revealed in interviews that he has bipolar disorder.

In 2019, during the shooting of the movie Raoul Taburin a un secret, based on the book by Jean-Jacques Sempé, Poelvoorde had a bicycle accident and received 17 stitches.

== Selected filmography ==
Year	Title	Role	Director
1992	Man Bites Dog	Ben	Rémy Belvaux, André Bonzel and Benoît Poelvoorde
1997	Pour rire ("Just for Laughs")	The innocent	Lucas Belvaux
1997	Les Randonneurs ("Hikers")	Éric	Philippe Harel
1998	Les convoyeurs attendent ("The Carriers Are Waiting")	Roger	Benoît Mariage
2001	Le Vélo de Ghislain Lambert ("Ghislain Lambert's Bicycle")	Ghislain Lambert	Philippe Harel
2002	Le Boulet ("Dead Weight")	Francis Reggio	Alain Berberian
2003	Rire et Châtiment ("Laughter and Punishment")	First Aid Instructor	Isabelle Doval
2004	Podium	Bernard Frédéric	Yann Moix
2004	Atomik Circus, le retour de James Bataille ("The Return of James Battle")	Allan Chiasse	Didier Poiraud and Thierry Poiraud
2004	Narco	Lenny Bar	Tristan Aurouet and Gilles Lellouche
2004	Aaltra	Motocross Layman	Benoît Delépine and Gustave Kervern
2005	Akoibon	Jean-Mi	Édouard Baer
2005	In His Hands	Laurent Kessler	Anne Fontaine
2006	Jean-Philippe	Bernard Frédéric	Laurent Tuel
2006	Charlie Says	Joss	Nicole Garcia
2007	Two Worlds	Rémy Bassano	Daniel Cohen
2008	Astérix at the Olympic Games	Brutus	Thomas Langmann and Frédéric Forestier
2008	Louise Hires a Contract Killer	Guy, the engineer	Gustave Kervern and Benoît Delépine
2009	Beauties at War	Franck Chevrel	Patrice Leconte
2009	Coco Before Chanel	Étienne Balsan	Anne Fontaine
2009	Park Benches	Customer at the wardrobe	Bruno Podalydès
2010	Dumas	Auguste Maquet	Safy Nebbou
2010	Mammuth	Competitor	Benoît Delépine and Gustave Kervern
2010	Romantics Anonymous	Jean-René Van Den Hugde	Jean-Pierre Améris
2010	Kill Me Please	Monsieur Demanet	Olias Barco
2010	Nothing to Declare	Ruben Vandevoorde	Dany Boon
2011	My Worst Nightmare	Patrick	Anne Fontaine
2012	Le Grand Soir	Benoît Savelli a.k.a. "Not"	Gustave Kervern and Benoît Delépine
2013	Une histoire d'amour	Banker	Hélène Fillières
2013	The Big Bad Wolf	Philippe	Nicolas Charlet & Bruno Lavaine
2014	The Price of Fame	Eddy Ricaart	Xavier Beauvois
2014	Three Hearts	Marc	Benoît Jacquot
2015	The Brand New Testament	God	Jaco Van Dormael
2015	Une famille à louer	Paul-André Delalande	Jean-Pierre Améris
2016	The Jews	Boris	Yvan Attal
2016	Saint-Amour	Bruno	Gustave Kervern and Benoît Delépine
2018	Keep an Eye Out	Commissaire Buron	Quentin Dupieux
2019	Adoration	Hinkel	Fabrice Du Welz
2020	Delete History	Deliveryman	
2021	The Green Shutters	Félix	Jean Becker
2021	Inexorable	Marcel Bellmer	Fabrice Du Welz
2024	Beating Hearts	La Brosse	Gilles Lellouche
2024	The Art of Nothing	Yves Machond	Stefan Liberski

=== Voice acting ===
- 1996 : Les Guignols de l'info: Alain Madelin (1 episode)
- 2009 : A Town Called Panic
- 2024: Savages

=== Short films ===
- 1997 : Le Signaleur
- 1988 : Pas de C4 pour Daniel Daniel by Rémy Belvaux and André Bonzel
