= Journey Through China =

2015 French drama film

- Journey Through China film poster
- Directed by: Zoltan Mayer
- Written by: Zoltan Mayer
- Produced by: Carole Scotta; Julie Billy; Natacha Devillers; Simon Arnal; Caroline Benjo
- Starring: Yolande Moreau
- Cinematography: Georges Lechaptois
- Edited by: Camille Toubkis
- Music by: Steve Shehan
- Production companies: Haut et Court; France 3 Cinéma
- Distributed by: Haut et Court
- Release date: 25 March 2015
- Running time: 96 minutes
- Countries: France; China
- Language: French
- Budget: $2.9 million
- Box office: $1.7 million

Journey Through China (French: Voyage en Chine) is a 2015 French drama film directed by Zoltan Mayer, his first feature film that was said to be "thoughtful and well-lensed".

For her Journey Through China starring role, Belgian actress Yolande Moreau was nominated for Best Actress at the 6th Magritte Awards.

== Plot ==
Liliane goes in China for the first time in her life to repatriate the body of her son, who died in an accident. Immersed in this culture so long ago, this trip marked by mourning becomes a journey of initiation.

== Cast ==
- Yolande Moreau as Liliane Rousseau
- Jingjing Qu as Danjie
- Dong Fu Lin as Chao
- Ling Zi Liu as Li Shu Lan
- Qing Dong as Ruo Yu
- Yilin Yang as Yun
- André Wilms as Richard Rousseau
- Chenwei Li as Master Sanchen
- Sophie Chen as Mademoiselle Yang

== Production ==
The movie was shot in China.
