= Near Death Experience (film) =

- Film poster
- Directed by: Benoît Delépine; Gustave Kervern
- Written by: Benoît Delépine; Gustave Kervern
- Produced by: Benoît Delépine; Gustave Kervern
- Starring: Michel Houellebecq
- Cinematography: Hugues Poulain
- Edited by: Stéphane Elmadjian
- Music by: Guillaume Lebraz
- Production company: No Money Productions
- Distributed by: Ad Vitam Distribution
- Release dates: 1 September 2014 (Venice); 10 September 2014 (France)
- Running time: 87 minutes
- Country: France
- Language: French
- Budget: € 0.38 million

Near Death Experience is a 2014 French drama film directed, produced and written by Benoît Delépine and Gustave Kervern. It was selected to be screened in the Horizons section of the 71st Venice International Film Festival.

== Cast ==
- Michel Houellebecq as Paul
- Marius Bertram as tramp
- Benoît Delépine as colleague
- Gustave Kervern as colleague
- Manon Chancé as the driver
