= Avida (film) =

2006 film by Benoît Delépine and Gustave Kervern

- Theatrical release poster
- Directed by: Benoît Delépine; Gustave Kervern
- Written by: Benoît Delépine; Gustave Kervern
- Produced by: Mathieu Kassovitz; Benoît Jaubert
- Starring: Gustave Kervern; Velvet; Martin; Benoît Delépine
- Cinematography: Hugues Poulain
- Edited by: Stéphane Elmadjian
- Production companies: MNP; StudioCanal; No Money Productions
- Distributed by: Ad Vitam
- Release dates: 21 May 2006 (Cannes); 13 September 2006 (France)
- Running time: 83 minutes
- Country: France
- Language: French

Avida is a 2006 French black comedy film written and directed by Benoît Delépine and Gustave Kervern. Shot in black-and-white, the film uses surreal humour and features little dialogue.

== Plot ==
A deaf-mute and two ketamine addicts employed at a private family zoo try to carry out a plot to kidnap an obese billionaire's dog. An accident at the zoo's lion pit foils their plan. Still after the ransom money, the three kidnappers agree to the overweight billionaire's last wish to help her climb a high mountain, where she hopes to die.

== Cast ==
- Gustave Kervern as The deaf-mute captive
- Velvet as Avida
- Martin as The drug addict
- Benoît Delépine as The man with the Scotch Tape head
- Fernando Arrabal as The suicidal picador
- Jean-Claude Carrière as The paranoid rich man
- Kati Outinen as The woman with the water jug
- Remo Forlani as The disturbing director
- Stéphane Sanseverino as The singing prisoner
- Bouli Lanners as The zoo boss
- Rokia Traoré as The benevolent singer
- Claude Chabrol as The easygoing zoophile
- Albert Dupontel as The maladroit bodyguard
- Philippe Vuillemin as The misunderstood taxidermist
- Anselme as The faïence singer
- Rémy Kolpa Kopoul as The stocky man in the sled
- Robert Dehoux as The talking armoire
- Christophe Salengro as The faltering guide

== Production ==
=== Filming ===
The film was shot in the Nord-Pas-de-Calais region between 25 July and 20 August 2005. The zoo scenes were shot at the zoo of the French commune of Maubeuge.

=== Style ===
The film is considered close to surrealism by critics due to its unconventional story and bizarre characters. Shot in black-and-white, the film uses absurd gags and contains very little dialogue. The directors, however, have insisted Avida is not a surrealist film but rather an homage to surrealism and specifically to Luis Buñuel's 1930 film L'Age d'Or.

The film is also a tribute to the surrealist artist Salvador Dalí. The film's title is an allusion to ávida dollars ("eager for dollars"), which is an anagram of Salvador Dalí. The anagram was coined by the surrealist theorist André Breton, who used it to document Dalí's increasing celebrity status in the United States. The derisive nickname was used by Dali's contemporaries as an implication of commercialism by abandoning surrealism in favour of fame and money. At the end of the film, a hand holds a watch in front of the camera so that it obscures the billionaire's face. The final scene features a painting reminiscent of Salvador Dalí and is the only scene in color.

== Release ==
Avida was included in the official selection of the 59th Cannes Film Festival, where it was screened out of competition on 21 May 2006. It was theatrically released on 13 September 2006 by Ad Vitam Distribution.

== Reception ==
=== Box office ===
In France, the film sold 1,220 admissions on its first day. It went on to sell 6,982 admissions in its opening weekend. At the end of its theatrical run, the film sold a total of 22,827 admissions.

=== Critical response ===
Avida received an average rating of 3.1 out of 5 stars on the French website AlloCiné, based on 19 reviews.

Variety's Deborah Young wrote: "Somewhere between Monty Python, Jacques Tati and a slideshow of New Yorker cartoons, this critique of life's cruel inconsistency confirms the French co-directors' gift for reinterpreting surrealism in a humorously modern key."

== See also ==
- List of black-and-white films produced since 1966
