= The Green Shutters =

- Directed by: Jean Becker
- Written by: Jean-Loup Dabadie
- Based on: Les Volets verts by Georges Simenon
- Produced by: Laurent Pétin, Michèle Pétin
- Starring: Gérard Depardieu; Fanny Ardant; Benoît Poelvoorde
- Cinematography: Yves Angelo
- Edited by: Franck Nakache
- Music by: Frédéric Vercheval
- Production company: ARP Sélection
- Distributed by: ARP Sélection
- Release date: August 24, 2022
- Running time: 97 minutes
- Country: France
- Language: French
- Budget: €6.2 million

The Green Shutters (French: Les Volets verts) is a 2022 French drama film directed by Jean Becker. It is based on the 1950 novel of the same name by Georges Simenon, adapted for the screen by Jean-Loup Dabadie in what would be his final screenplay.

== Synopsis ==
Jules Maugin is a revered figure in French cinema — a "sacred monster" of the screen. In the 1960s, at the peak of his fame, he learns that he does not have long to live.

== Cast ==
- Gérard Depardieu as Jules Maugin
- Fanny Ardant as Jeanne Swann
- Benoît Poelvoorde as Félix
- Stéfi Celma as Alice
- Naomi Kingue Johnson as Baba, Alice’s daughter
- Anouk Grinberg as Maria, the dresser
- Fred Testot as Narcisse, the chauffeur
- Tom Rivoire as Jules Laloiseau
- Didier Flamand as Professor Biguet
- Jean-Luc Porraz as Gilbert, head waiter
- Tom Novembre as Albert, head waiter
- Marie Matheron as Corinne Biguet
- Marc Andreoni as Vendée fisherman
- Philippe Brigaud as Alice’s neighbor
- Mélanie Page as woman in photo couple
- Didier Brice as director of the slap scene
- Loïc Armel Colin as commercial director
- José Paul as beer commercial director
- Luc-Antoine Diquéro as Shakespeare Garden director

== Production ==
=== Development ===
In June 2020, it was revealed that Jean-Loup Dabadie had completed and submitted a 96-page script shortly before his death in May 2020. ARP Sélection acquired the rights. The novel had previously been adapted into an episode of the 1988 television series L'Heure Simenon.

In June 2021, Jean Becker was announced as the film's director.

=== Casting ===
Gérard Depardieu and Fanny Ardant were cast in the lead roles, reportedly envisioned by Dabadie. In September 2021, Benoît Poelvoorde’s participation was confirmed.

=== Filming ===
Filming began on 23 August 2021 in Paris. In September, filming took place in the Var region, including Le Lavandou and Martigues. Filming wrapped on 30 September 2021.

=== Sexual assault by Gérard Depardieu ===
On 24 February 2024, a set decorator filed a complaint against Gérard Depardieu alleging sexual assault, harassment, and sexist behavior during filming in 2021. A second woman, an assistant director, also accused Depardieu of groping her. Depardieu was charged, with his trial starting in March 2025. Two of the film's actresses, Fanny Ardant and Anouk Grinberg, attended the trial, the former to testify in Depardieu's favor and the latter to support the plaintiffs. Depardieu was found guilty of both counts of sexual assault on 13 May 2025.

== Reception ==
=== Critical response ===
On Allociné, the film has an average rating of 2.7 out of 5 based on 16 reviews.

Le Parisien praised the emotional depth of the story and Depardieu’s performance, calling it "a touching portrayal of a man saying goodbye to his career and lost loves."

Le Journal du Dimanche echoed this sentiment, stating that Depardieu was "particularly moving in a role that feels like an echo of his own life."
