= Bouli Lanners =

Belgian actor (born 1965)

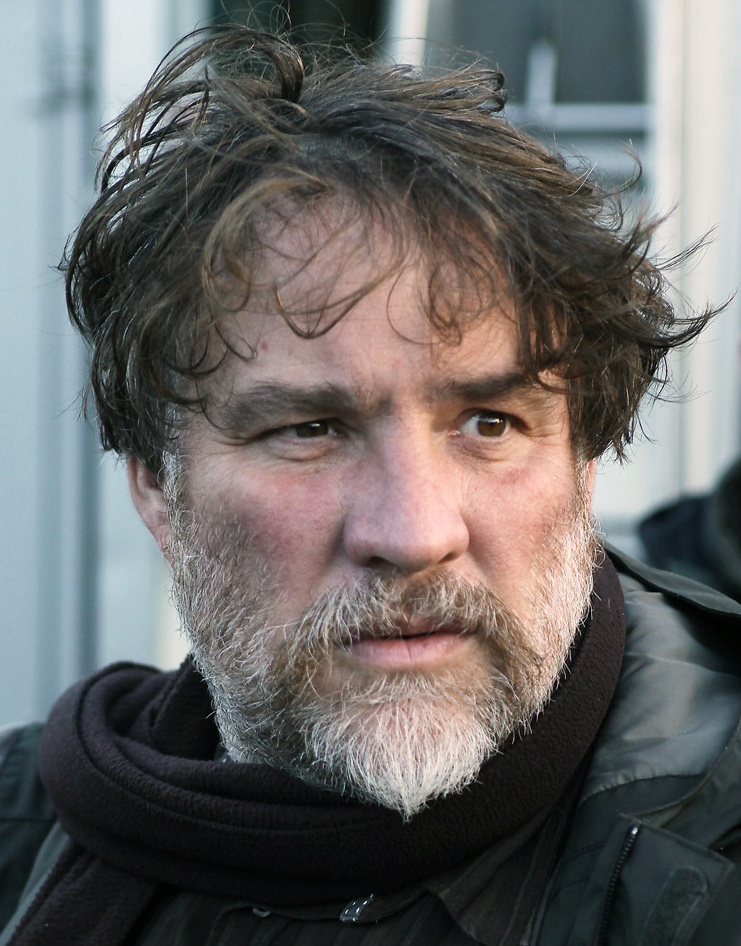
- Lanners in 2010
- Born: 20 May 1965 (age 61); Moresnet-Chapelle, in Plombières, Liège, Belgium
- Other name: Bouli
- Occupations: Actor, director, writer
- Years active: 1989–present

Philippe "Bouli" Lanners (born 20 May 1965) is a Belgian actor, author and film director. His film The Giants was nominated for twelve Magritte Awards, winning five, including Best Film and Best Director.

== Biography ==
Lanners was born on 20 May 1965 in Moresnet-Chapelle, Belgium. His mother was a cleaning lady and his father was a customs agent. He spent a year at the Royal Academy of Fine Arts in Liège, after which he continued to paint while doing odd jobs until turning his attention to cinema at the turn of the century.

== Filmography ==
=== As actor ===
Year	Title	Role	Director	Notes
1989	Les Snuls			TV series
1991	Toto the Hero	Gangster	Jaco Van Dormael	
1995	La veuve de l'architecte	Serge	Philippe Monnier	TV movie
1997	Urinoir dogs	Kadak	Willem Wallyn	Short
1997	La conquête du Pôle Sud		Patric Jean & Manfred Karge	Short
1997	Arlette	Émile	Claude Zidi	
1997	Le signaleur		Benoît Mariage	Short
1997	Au bord de l'autoroute		Olivier Jahan	Short
1997	Le pantalon	Sgt. Fourrier	Yves Boisset	TV movie
1997	Les carnets de monsieur Manatane	Slobodan	Christian Merret-Palmair & Jean-Michel Ben Soussan	TV series
1998	Tatort		Niki Stein	TV series (1 Episode)
1998	Il n'y a pas d'amour sans histoires	The driver	Jérôme Foulon	TV movie
1999	The Carriers Are Waiting	Coach	Benoît Mariage (2)	
1999	A Dog of Flanders	Constable	Kevin Brodie	
1999	Alien Adventure	Voice	Ben Stassen	Short
2000	Faites comme si je n'étais pas là	The doctor	Olivier Jahan (2)	
2000	Léopold	Bart	Joël Séria	TV movie
2000	Le centre du monde	Claude	Vivian Goffette	Short
2001	Pauline and Paulette	Taxi driver	Lieven Debrauwer	
2002	Petites misères	Eddy	Philippe Boon & Laurent Brandenbourger	
2003	Joséphine		Joël Vanhoebrouck	Short
2003	En territoire indien	Policeman	Lionel Epp	
2003	Des plumes dans la tête	Sergio	Thomas De Thier	
2003	L'autre	The institution's director	Benoît Mariage (3)	
2004	Aaltra	The Finnish singer	Gustave Kervern & Benoît Delépine	
2004	25 degrés en hiver		Stéphane Vuillet	
2004	Madame Édouard	Gégé	Nadine Monfils	
2004	When the Sea Rises	The market's owner	Yolande Moreau & Gilles Porte	
2004	Atomik Circus – Le retour de James Bataille	Chip	Didier & Thierry Poiraud	
2004	A Very Long Engagement	Corporal Urbain Chardolot	Jean-Pierre Jeunet	
2004	Twin Fliks	Bernard Graffé	Frédéric Jannin & Stefan Liberski	TV series
2005	Bunker paradise	David d'Ermont de Viard	Stefan Liberski (2)	
2006	Saddam Hussein Is Alive		Jean-Marie Buchet	Short
2006	Enfermés dehors	Youssouf	Albert Dupontel	
2006	Avida	The animal collector	Gustave Kervern & Benoît Delépine (2)	
2007	Les larmes d'argent		Mourad Boucif	
2007	Cowboy	Debaest	Benoît Mariage (4)	
2007	Où est la main de l'homme sans tête	Mathias	Guillaume & Stéphane Malandrin	
2007	Les amis réunis	Himself	Alain Fryns	Short
2008	Asterix at the Olympic Games	Samagas	Frédéric Forestier & Thomas Langmann	
2008	Eldorado	Yvan	Bouli Lanners	
2008	I Always Wanted to Be a Gangster	Léon	Samuel Benchetrit	
2008	Louise Hires a Contract Killer	Michel Pinchon	Gustave Kervern & Benoît Delépine (3)	
2009	Rien de personnel	Pierrick Barbieri	Mathias Gokalp	
2009	A Town Called Panic	Postman / Simon / Cow	Stéphane Aubier & Vincent Patar	
2009	Le Vilain	Nick Korazy	Albert Dupontel (2)	
2010	Mammuth	The recruiter	Gustave Kervern & Benoît Delépine (4)	
2010	Chicas	Maurice	Yasmina Reza	
2010	Blanc comme neige	Simon	Christophe Blanc	
2010	Sans queue ni tête	Xavier Demestre	Jeanne Labrune	
2010	Kill Me Please	M. Vidal	Olias Barco	Nominated – Magritte Award for Best Supporting Actor
2010	Nothing to Declare	Bruno Vanuxem	Dany Boon	
2011	Des vents contraires	Monsieur Bréhel	Jalil Lespert	
2012	Rust and Bone	Martial	Jacques Audiard	Magritte Award for Best Supporting Actor
2012	Le grand soir	The guard	Gustave Kervern & Benoît Delépine (5)	
2012	Asterix and Obelix: God Save Britannia	Grossebaf	Laurent Tirard	
2013	11.6	Arnaud	Philippe Godeau	Nominated – Magritte Award for Best Supporting Actor
2013	La grande boucle	Rémi Pletinckx	Laurent Tuel	
2013	Lulu femme nue	Charles	Sólveig Anspach	Nominated – Magritte Award for Best Actor
2013	9 Month Stretch	The cop	Albert Dupontel (3)	
2013	La confrérie des larmes	The Owl	Jean-Baptiste Andrea	
2013	La bûche de Noël	Santa / Postman / Simon	Stéphane Aubier & Vincent Patar (2)	Short
2014	La part de l'ombre		Olivier Smolders	Short
2014	Nicholas on Holiday	M. Bernique	Laurent Tirard (2)	
2014	All Cats Are Grey	Paul	Savina Dellicour	Nominated – Magritte Award for Best Actor
2015	I'm Dead But I Have Friends		Guillaume & Stéphane Malandrin (2)	
2015	April and the Twisted World	Voice	Christian Desmares & Franck Ekinci	
2016	Girls with Balls		Olivier Afonso	
2016	Raw	The driver	Julia Ducournau	
2016	Heal the Living	Pierre Révol	Katell Quillévéré	
2017	Bloody Milk	Jamy	Hubert Charuel	
2017	Above the Law	Danny Bouvy	François Troukens, Jean-François Hensgens	Nominated—Magritte Award for Best Supporting Actor
2018	Real Love	Mario Messina	Claire Burger	Magritte Award for Best Actor
2018	Third Wedding (Troisièmes noces)	Martin	David Lambert	
2019	Patrick	Mon	Tim Mielants	Nominated—Magritte Award for Best Supporting Actor
2021	Love Song for Tough Guys	Poussin	Samuel Benchetrit	Nominated—Magritte Award for Best Actor
2022	The Night of the 12th	Marceau	Dominik Moll	Magritte Award for Best Actor
2023	A Real Job	Benjamin's father	Thomas Lilti	
2024	Une affaire de principe	José Bové	Antoine Raimbault	

=== As director & writer ===
Year	Title	Notes	Awards
1999	Travellinckx	Short	Namur International Festival of French-Speaking Film – Best Belgian French Short Film
2001	Muno	Short	Flanders International Film Festival Ghent – European Short Film; Torino Film Festival – Best International Short Film; Torino Film Festival – FIPRESCI Prize – Special Mention; Lille Short Film Festival – Jury Award; Namur International Festival of French-Speaking Film – Best Belgian French Short Film; Namur International Festival of French-Speaking Film – Best Short Film; Tampere International Short Film Festival – International Competition; Nominated – European Film Award for Best Short Film; Nominated – Joseph Plateau Award for Best Belgian Short Film
2005	Ultranova	Feature	Berlin International Film Festival – Panorama; Gijón International Film Festival – Best Feature; Nominated – Joseph Plateau Award for Best Belgian Director
2008	Eldorado	Feature	Cannes Film Festival – Directors' Fortnight or Critics' Week; Cannes Film Festival – Label Europa Cinemas; Cannes Film Festival – Regards Jeunes Prize; Nominated – César Award for Best Foreign Film
2011	The Giants	Feature	Cannes Film Festival – C.I.C.A.E. Award; Cannes Film Festival – SACD Prize; Magritte Award for Best Film; Magritte Award for Best Director; Buster International Children's Film Festival – Best Youth Film; Nominated – Chicago International Film Festival – Best International Feature; Nominated – Magritte Award for Best Screenplay
2016	The First, the Last	Feature	Cabourg Film Festival – Best Director; Magritte Award for Best Film; Magritte Award for Best Director; Nominated – Magritte Award for Best Screenplay
2021	Nobody Has to Know	Feature	Chicago International Film Festival Award for Best Actor; Magritte Award for Best Film; Magritte Award for Best Director; Nominated – Magritte Award for Best Screenplay

=== As producer ===
Year	Title	Director	Notes
2014	Carnage-Terminus	Chris Lequarré	Short
