= Mammuth =

2010 film

- Film poster
- Directed by: Benoît Delépine; Gustave de Kervern
- Written by: Benoît Delépine; Gustave de Kervern
- Produced by: Mat Troi Day
- Starring: Gérard Depardieu; Yolande Moreau
- Cinematography: Hugues Poulain
- Edited by: Stéphane Elmadjian
- Music by: Gaëtan Roussel
- Distributed by: Ad Vitam Distribution
- Release dates: 19 February 2010 (Berlinale); 21 April 2010 (France)
- Running time: 92 minutes
- Country: France
- Language: French
- Budget: $2.7 million
- Box office: $7.1 million

Mammuth is a 2010 French drama film directed by Benoît Delépine and Gustave de Kervern. It was nominated for the Golden Bear at the 60th Berlin International Film Festival. For her role, Yolande Moreau was nominated for Best Actress at the 1st Magritte Awards.

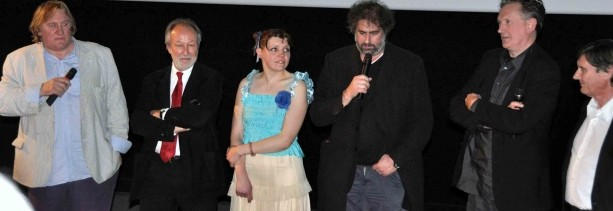
Directors, stars and producers at a premiere in Paris.

== Plot ==
Serge Pilardosse (Depardieu), retires from the job he has held for many years, as a slaughterhouse worker in Lyon. His colleagues throw him an impromptu party and give him a gift, which he doesn't like. Once home, he becomes all too quickly restless and realizes that being retired is kind of boring, as he has nothing to do. Eventually his wife convinces him to go and see about claiming a pension.

At the pensions office, he discovers that even though he has never missed a day's work for illness, nor been unemployed since college, he cannot claim a full pension due to a few gaps in his pensions history, which he has to verify with 10 written proofs from each employer in question. Back home, his wife insists that he goes for the required papers so that the pensions claim can be processed. He takes his Münch Mammut motorcycle, nicknamed "Mammuth" and sails off through France to retrieve the documents.

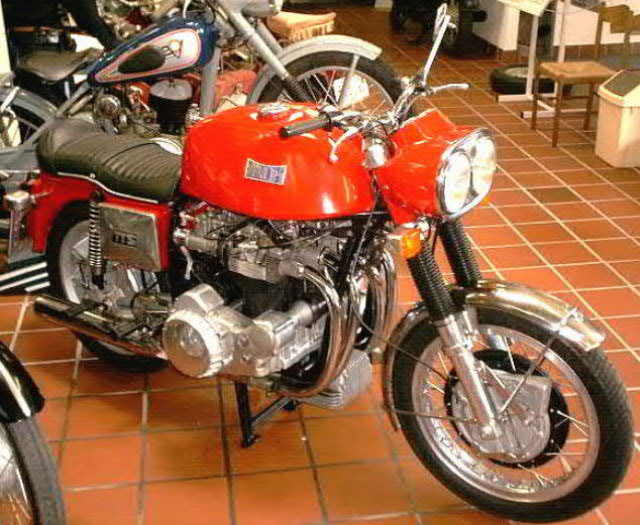
The Munch-4 TTS 1200 Mammut model used in the film.

Over the course of his endeavor, he loses his way and wonders about the sense of his life. He relives memories from his past, especially concerning his girlfriend who many years ago died in a motorcycle accident. He visits his previous places of employment, old friends, his aging cousin and the home of his estranged brother, hoping to make amends. He also gets to know his oddball niece, who introduces him to the world of naïve art. Realising that people perceive him as a bit of a jerk, he returns to his brother's house and his niece takes him into her world where he re-discovers himself and the poet within. Eventually he visits the site where the accident happened. He places a remembrance bouquet and shakes off the memories, finally liberating himself. He returns to his wife newly invigorated, happy about his future.

== Cast ==
- Gérard Depardieu as Serge Pilardosse
- Yolande Moreau as Catherine Pilardosse
- Isabelle Adjani as Serge's late girlfriend
- Miss Ming as Solange Pilardosse
- Benoît Poelvoorde as competitor
- Bouli Lanners as recruiter
- Catherine Hosmalin as Catherine's friend
- Philippe Nahon as hospital director
- Anna Mouglalis as disabled woman
- Albert Delpy as Pierre
- Bruno Lochet as Restaurant's client
- Gustave Kervern as delicatessen employee
- Siné as vineyard owner
- Dick Annegarn as cemetery warden
- Blutch as pension fund employee

== Production ==
The film was shot in Charente, including Angoulême, and in Royan, Saint-Palais-sur-Mer et Vaux-sur-Mer (Charente-Maritime).

== Reception ==
The film received mixed to positive reviews from critics. Review aggregator Rotten Tomatoes reports that 63% of 24 critics gave the film a positive review, for an average rating of 5.3/10. Metacritic gave the film a score of 47 out of 100, based on 5 critics.

Variety's Jay Weissberg described the film as "occasionally amusing". Matthew Turner from "View Auckland" shared this opinion ("frequently hilarious") but also complained the film's second part suffered with a "disjointed structure". Slant Magazine's review had a similar gist. Here Bill Weber wrote the film achieved "a few chuckles" with blunt jokes but the gags would become increasingly stale.
