= Yolande Moreau =

Belgian actress

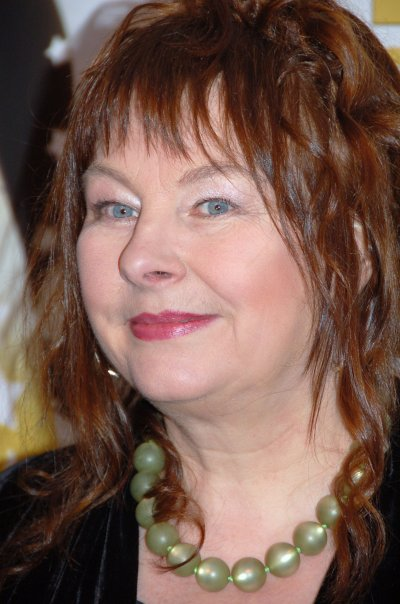
- Moreau in 2009
- Born: 27 February 1953 (age 73); Brussels, Belgium
- Education: École Philippe Gaulier
- Occupations: Actress; comedian; director; screenwriter
- Years active: 1981–present
- Children: 2

Yolande Moreau (born 27 February 1953) is a Belgian actress, film director, comedian, and screenwriter. Her many accolades include winning three César Awards, two for Best Actress and one for Best First Film, making her the most awarded Belgian actress. Moreau has received a Lumière Award, a Magritte Award, and an LAFCA Award. As well as nominations for two European Film Awards, two Molière Awards, and an additional 12 Magritte Awards.

Moreau's many film credits include Agnès Varda's Vagabond (1985), Séraphine (2008), Amélie (2001), Germinal (1993), The Three Brothers (1995), Happiness is in the Field (1995), The Horseman on the Roof (1995), 9 Month Stretch (2013), Paris, Je T'aime (2006), Micmacs (2009), Incognito (2009), The Brand New Testament (2015), In the House (2012), Louise-Michel (2008), Gainsbourg: A Heroic Life (2010), The Pack (2010), When the Sea Rises (2004), which she also co-wrote and co-directed, and Henri (2013), which she wrote and directed. On television, Moreau was the star of Les Deschiens (1993–2002).

On stage, Moreau has received two Molière Award nominations for her performances in Sale affaire du sexe et du crime and Prévert.

== Career ==
After a stage career in Brussels, Moreau studied theatre and clown under Philippe Gaulier at École Philippe Gaulier in France.

She made her cinematic debut with director Agnès Varda in two movies: Sept pièces (1984) and Vagabond (1985).

In 1989, she joined Jérôme Deschamps and Macha Makeieff's troupe, of which she became one of the stars, especially on the TV programme, Les Deschiens.

She played La Levaque in Germinal (1993) directed by Claude Berri, a concierge in the film Amélie (2001) and Mama Chow in Micmacs (2009) (both directed by Jean-Pierre Jeunet), a mime in Paris, Je T'aime (2006) and a lovesick woman in Vagabond (1985) directed by Agnès Varda.

She made her directorial debut with the movie When the Sea Rises, which she co-wrote and starred in. The movie was acclaimed by critics, and Yolande Moreau won two César Awards for Best Debut and Best Actress.

Moreau stars in the French horror thriller film The Pack, which premiered at the 2010 Cannes Film Festival. Her 2013 film Henri was screened in the Directors' Fortnight section at the 2013 Cannes Film Festival.

Moreau was scheduled to be the guest of honour at the 2017 Brussels Film Festival, but this edition had to be cancelled after subsidies were withdrawn.

== Personal life ==
At 18, she met an older man. Together they have two children, Héloïse and Nils, but they separated when Yolande was 21. Alone with her two children, she worked in various trades, including as a housekeeper. She is the grandmother of four grandchildren.

== Awards and honours ==
Moreau has won three César Awards: one for Best First Film (in 2005) and two for Best Actress (in 2005 and 2009) and is the most awarded Belgian actress.

== Theater ==
Year	Title	Author	Director
1974	Julien de Bruxelles	Josette Marx	Marcel Cornelis
1981–86	Sale affaire du sexe et du crime	Yolande Moreau	Yolande Moreau
1986	Sous-sol	Arnold Boiseau	Arnold Boiseau
1988	Britannicus	Jean Racine	Herbert Rolland
1989–91	Lapin chasseur	Jérôme Deschamps & Macha Makeieff	Jérôme Deschamps & Macha Makeieff
1992–94	Les brigands	Jacques Offenbach	Jérôme Deschamps & Macha Makeieff
1992–93	Les pieds dans l'eau	Jérôme Deschamps & Macha Makeieff	Jérôme Deschamps & Macha Makeieff
1994–96	C'est magnifique	Jérôme Deschamps & Macha Makeieff	Jérôme Deschamps & Macha Makeieff
1997	Les Précieuses ridicules	Molière	Jérôme Deschamps & Macha Makeieff
1999–2001	Les Pensionnaires	Jérôme Deschamps & Macha Makeieff	Jérôme Deschamps & Macha Makeieff
2000	Les Précieuses ridicules	Molière	Jérôme Deschamps & Macha Makeieff
2007	Sale affaire du sexe et du crime	Yolande Moreau	Yolande Moreau
2018–19	Prévert	Jacques Prévert	Yolande Moreau & Christian Olivier

== Filmography ==
=== Actress ===
Year	Title	Role	Director	Notes
1984	7p., cuis., s. de b., ... à saisir	Yolande	Agnès Varda	Short
1985	Vagabond	Yolande	Agnès Varda	
1985	Vivement ce soir	A client	Patrick Van Antwerpen	
1989	Le jour de congé		Carole Laganière	Short
1991	Navarro	The Maid	Gérard Marx	TV series (1 episode)
1992	My Wife's Girlfriends	The Concierge	Didier Van Cauwelaert	
1993	Germinal	La Levaque	Claude Berri	
1993	Son of the Shark	The Driver	Agnès Merlet	
1993	Loonies at Large	Bus's Driver	Marco Pico	
1993	La lettre inachevée	Lydia	Chantal Picault	TV movie
1993–2002	Les Deschiens	Yolande	Jérôme Deschamps & Macha Makeïeff	TV series
1995	The Three Brothers	The Shop Owner	Didier Bourdon & Bernard Campan	
1995	Happiness Is in the Field	Lucette	Étienne Chatiliez	
1995	The Horseman on the Roof	Madame Rigoard	Jean-Paul Rappeneau	
1995	Maigret	Madame Popineau	Pierre Joassin	TV series (1 episode)
1995	L'avocate	Marie-Jo	Philippe Lefebvre	TV series (1 episode)
1996	The Green Beautiful	Nicole	Coline Serreau	
1996	Baloche	Jacqueline Van Bersen	Dominique Baron	TV movie
1996	Le cheval de coeur	Josiane	Charlotte Brandström	TV movie
1997	An Air So Pure	Laure Surville	Yves Angelo	
1997	Tout doit disparaître	Irène Millard	Philippe Muyl	
1998	Full Moon	Marie Rochat	Fredi M. Murer	
1998	Let There Be Light	Contractual God	Arthur Joffé	
1998	Le choix d'une mère	Madame Parmentier	Tommy Collins & Jacques Malaterre	TV movie
1999	L'Ami du jardin	Miss Pogut	Jean-Louis Bouchaud	
1999	Merci mon chien	Marie-Do	Philippe Galland	
1999	Le Voyage à Paris	The Baker	Marc-Henri Dufresne	
1999	Premier Noël	The Teacher	Kamel Cherif	Short
2001	Amélie	Madeleine Wallace	Jean-Pierre Jeunet	
2001	The Milk of Human Kindness	Babette	Dominique Cabrera	
2001	Sa mère, la pute	Annie	Brigitte Roüan	TV movie
2002	Step by Step	Chantal Bex	Philippe Blasband	
2002	A Piece of Sky	Madame Pasquier	Bénédicte Liénard	
2002	Le Champ dolent, le roman de la terre	Louise	Hervé Baslé	TV Mini-Series
2003	Body to Body	The Teacher	François Hanss	
2003	Welcome to the Roses	Marsanne	Francis Palluau	
2003	Joséphine		Joël Vanhoebrouck	Short
2003	Grand ciel	Colette	Noël Alpi	Short
2004	Folle embellie	Hélène	Dominique Cabrera	
2004	When the Sea Rises	Irène	Yolande Moreau & Gilles Porte	
2004	La vie est si courte		Hervé Baslé	TV movie
2005	Ze Film	The Kodak's Woman	Guy Jacques	
2005	The Axe	The Post Clerk	Costa-Gavras	
2005	Bunker Paradise	Claire	Stefan Liberski	
2006	Locked Out	Gina	Albert Dupontel	
2006	Paris, je t'aime	The Mime	Sylvain Chomet	
2006	Call Me Elisabeth	Rose	Jean-Pierre Améris	
2006	Au crépuscule des temps	Margoline Ekh	Sarah Lévy	TV movie
2006	Le Cri	Marie	Hervé Baslé	TV Mini-Series
2007	The Last Mistress	Countess of Artelles	Catherine Breillat	
2007	Vous êtes de la police ?	Christine Léger	Romuald Beugnon	
2008	Séraphine	Séraphine Louis	Martin Provost	
2008	Mia and the Migoo	The Sorceress	Jacques-Rémy Girerd	
2008	A Day at the Museum	Madame Stenthels	Jean-Michel Ribes	
2008	Louise Hires a Contract Killer	Louise Ferrand	Benoît Delépine & Gustave Kervern	
2008	Villa Marguerite	Adèle Grandclément	Denis Malleval	TV movie
2009	Incognito	Madame Champenard	Éric Lavaine	
2009	Micmacs	Mama Chow	Jean-Pierre Jeunet	
2009	La Véritable Histoire du chat botté	The Queen	Pascal Hérold, Jérôme Deschamps, ...	
2010	Mammuth	Catherine Pilardosse	Benoît Delépine & Gustave Kervern	
2010	The Pack	La Spack	Franck Richard	
2010	Gainsbourg: A Heroic Life	Fréhel	Joann Sfar	
2010	Ya basta!		Benoît Delépine & Gustave Kervern	Short
2010	Le grand restaurant	A client	Gérard Pullicino	TV movie
2011	The Long Falling	Rose Mayer	Martin Provost	
2012	Not Dead	Punk Girl's Mother	Benoît Delépine & Gustave Kervern	
2012	In the House	Rosalie / Eugénie	François Ozon	
2012	Camille Rewinds	Camille's Mother	Noémie Lvovsky	
2012	Cendrillon au Far West	Felicity	Pascal Hérold	
2012	Dessine-moi un bouton	Rosela Jankovski	Gary Lebel	Short
2013	Henri	Aunt Michelle	Yolande Moreau	
2013	9 Month Stretch	Bob's Mother	Albert Dupontel	
2014	Ablations	Wortz's Assistant	Arnold de Parscau	
2014	Brèves de comptoir	Madame Lamelle	Jean-Michel Ribes	
2015	Journey Through China	Liliane Rousseau	Zoltan Mayer	
2015	The Brand New Testament	God's Wife	Jaco Van Dormael	
2015	Clim Arts	Terrae	Daniel Schick	TV movie
2016	Saint-Amour	Marie	Benoît Delépine & Gustave Kervern	
2016	A Woman's Life	Adélaïde Le Perthuis des Vauds	Stéphane Brizé	
2016	The Childhood of a Leader	Mona	Brady Corbet	
2016	Apollinaire – 13 film-poèmes	Voice	Charlie Belin, Marjorie Caup, ...	Short
2017	Crash Test Aglaé	Marcelle	Éric Gravel	
2017	De toutes mes forces	Madame Cousin	Chad Chenouga	
2017	Two Snails Set Off	Voice	Jean-Pierre Jeunet & Romain Segaud	Short
2017	Ceci n'est pas un trou	The grandmother	Lucie Thocaven	Short
2017	Capitaine Marleau	Catherine Rougemont	Josée Dayan	TV series (1 episode)
2018	I Feel Good	Monique Pora	Benoît Delépine & Gustave Kervern	
2018	Raymonde or the vertical escape	Raymonde	Sarah Van Den Boom	Short
2019	Cleo	Jet	Eva Cools	
2019	Rebels	Nadine Dewulder	Allan Mauduit	
2019	The Summer House	Jacqueline	Valeria Bruni Tedeschi	
2020	How to Be a Good Wife	Gilberte Van der Beck	Martin Provost	
2021	Mum Is Pouring Rain	Granny Onion	Hugo de Faucompret	Short
2021	Les enfants de Bohème	Manie	Judith Chemla	Short
2021	Le Grand restaurant 3	Christine	Romuald Boulanger & Pierre Palmade	TV movie
2021	Lupin	Etienne Comit's wife	Louis Leterrier	TV series (episode 2) uncredited min 48
2022	Les sans-dents	Calamity	Pascal Rabaté	
2022	Zaï Zaï Zaï Zaï	Inspector Jeanne Weber	François Desagnat	
2022	En même temps	Madame Bianca	Benoît Delépine & Gustave Kervern	
2023	Scarlet	The magician	Pietro Marcello	
2023	Le principal	Estelle	Chad Chenouga	
2023	La fiancée du poète	Mireille Stockaert	Yolande Moreau	
2024	Captives	Camomille	Arnaud des Pallières	
2024	Angelo dans la forêt mystérieuse	Mémé	Alexis Ducord & Vincent Paronnaud	
2024	Je ne me laisserai plus faire	Rosalie	Gustave Kervern	TV movie

=== Filmmaker ===
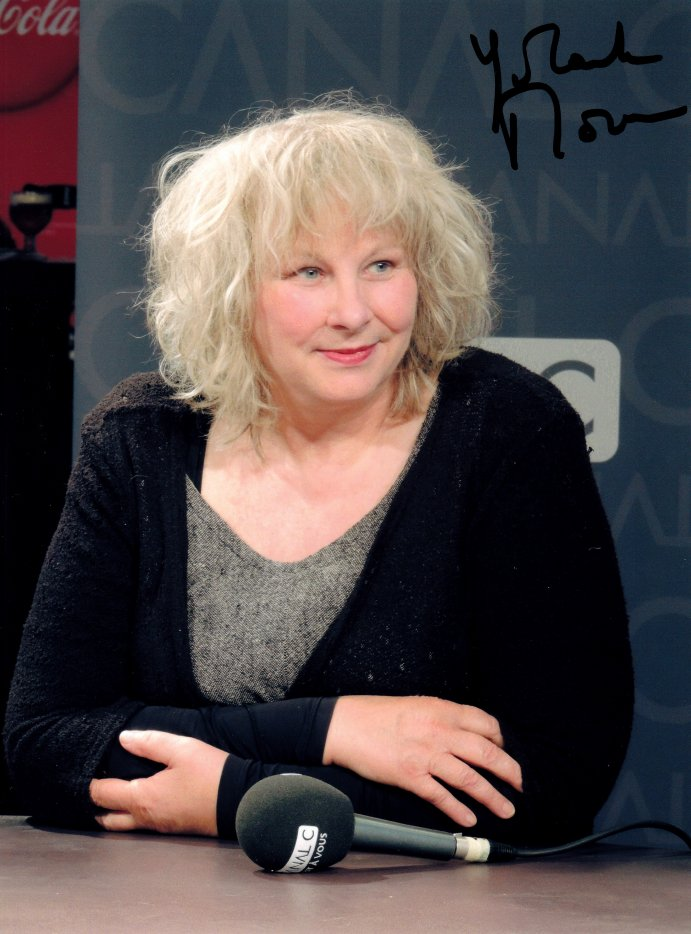
Yolande Moreau at the 2013 Festival International du Film Francophone de Namur

Year	Title	Notes
2004	When the Sea Rises	
2013	Henri	
2016	Nulle part, en France	Documentary
2023	La fiancée du poète	

== Box-office ==
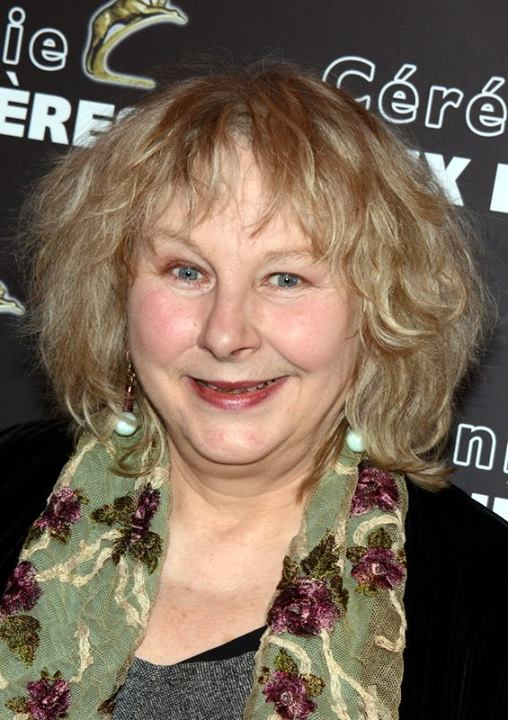
Yolande Moreau at the 19th Lumière Awards

Movies starring Yolande Moreau with more than a million of entries in France.

	Films	Director	Year	France (entries)
1	Amélie	Jean-Pierre Jeunet	2001	8,636,041
2	The Three Brothers	Didier Bourdon, Bernard Campan	1995	6,897,098
3	Germinal	Claude Berri	1993	6,161,776
4	Happiness Is in the Field	Étienne Chatiliez	1995	4,931,618
5	The Horseman on the Roof	Jean-Paul Rappeneau	1995	2,552,695
6	9 Month Stretch	Albert Dupontel	2013	2,070,776
7	Micmacs	Jean-Pierre Jeunet (2)	2009	1,258,804
8	Incognito	Éric Lavaine	2009	1,250,138
9	Gainsbourg: A Heroic Life	Joann Sfar	2010	1,199,451
10	In the House	François Ozon	2012	1,195,518
11	Vagabond	Agnès Varda	1985	1,080,143

== Awards and nominations ==
Year	Award	Nominated work	Result
1982	Festival du Rire de Rochefort – First Prize	Sale affaire du sexe et du crime	Won
2005	César Award for Best Actress	When the Sea Rises	Won
2005	César Award for Best First Feature Film	When the Sea Rises	Won
2005	European Film Award for European Discovery of the Year	When the Sea Rises	Nominated
2005	Festival International du Film de Namur – Best Actress	When the Sea Rises	Won
2005	Joseph Plateau Award for Best Belgian Actress	When the Sea Rises	Nominated
2005	Joseph Plateau Award for Best Belgian Screenplay	When the Sea Rises	Nominated
2005	Louis Delluc Prize for Best first Film	When the Sea Rises	Won
2008	Molière Award - Best One Man Show	Sale affaire du sexe et du crime	Nominated
2009	Cairo International Film Festival – Best Actress	Séraphine	Won
2009	César Award for Best Actress	Séraphine	Won
2009	Dublin Film Critics' Circle – Best Actress	Séraphine	Won
2009	Étoiles d'Or – Best Actress	Séraphine	Won
2009	European Film Award for Best Actress	Séraphine	Nominated
2009	Globes de Cristal Award for Best Actress	Séraphine	Nominated
2009	Los Angeles Film Critics Association Award for Best Actress	Séraphine	Won
2009	Lumière Award for Best Actress	Séraphine	Won
2009	National Society of Film Critics Award for Best Actress	Séraphine	Won
2009	Newport Beach Film Festival – Best Actress	Séraphine	Won
2009	Village Voice Film Poll for Best Actress	Séraphine	Nominated
2009	Festival de la fiction TV de La Rochelle – Best Actress	Villa Marguerite	Won
2010	Magritte Award for Best Actress	Mammuth	Nominated
2010	Magritte Award for Best Supporting Actress	Gainsbourg: A Heroic Life	Nominated
2011	Magritte Award for Best Actress	The Long Falling	Nominated
2012	Magritte Award for Best Supporting Actress	Camille Rewinds	Won
2013	César Award for Best Supporting Actress	Camille Rewinds	Nominated
2014	Cannes Film Festival – SACD Prize	Henri	Nominated
2014	Gijón International Film Festival – Best Film	Henri	Won
2014	Magritte Award for Best Film	Henri	Nominated
2014	Magritte Award for Best Director	Henri	Nominated
2014	Magritte Award for Best Screenplay	Henri	Nominated
2014	São Paulo International Film Festival – Best Feature Film	Henri	Nominated
2015	Magritte Award for Best Actress	Journey Through China	Nominated
2015	Magritte Award for Best Supporting Actress	The Brand New Testament	Nominated
2017	Magritte Award for Best Supporting Actress	A Woman's Life	Nominated
2018	Magritte Award for Best Actress	I Feel Good	Nominated
2019	Magritte Award for Best Supporting Actress	Cleo	Nominated
2019	Molière Award - Best Musical	Prévert	Nominated
2021	César Award for Best Supporting Actress	How to Be a Good Wife	Nominated
2023	Angoulême Francophone Film Festival - Best Screenplay	La fiancée du poète	Won
2024	Magritte Award for Best Actress	La fiancée du poète	Nominated
