= Saint-Amour (film) =

- Film poster
- Directed by: Benoît Delépine; Gustave Kervern
- Written by: Benoît Delépine; Gustave Kervern
- Produced by: Jean-Pierre Guérin; Benoît Delépine; Gustave Kervern
- Starring: Gérard Depardieu; Benoît Poelvoorde; Vincent Lacoste; Céline Sallette
- Cinematography: Hugues Poulain
- Edited by: Stéphane Elmadjian
- Music by: Sébastien Tellier
- Production companies: No Money Productions; JPG Films; Nexus Factory
- Distributed by: Le Pacte (France)
- Release dates: 19 February 2016 (Berlin); 2 March 2016 (France)
- Running time: 101 minutes
- Countries: France; Belgium
- Language: French
- Budget: $4.4 million
- Box office: $3.3 million

Saint-Amour (English: "Holy Love") is a 2016 French-Belgian comedy-drama film written, produced and directed by Benoît Delépine and Gustave Kervern.

== Plot ==
The story of a father and a son, farmers, whose relationships are conflictual. In an attempt to forge a new complicity, they go on the wine trail, with a Parisian taxi, crossed at the exit of the Agricultural Fair.

== Cast ==
- Gérard Depardieu as Jean
- Benoît Poelvoorde as Bruno
- Vincent Lacoste as Mike
- Céline Sallette as Venus
- Gustave Kervern as The Uncle
- Yolande Moreau as Marie (voice)
- Chiara Mastroianni as The boss of the chip stand
- Ana Girardot as The twin
- Andréa Ferréol as The breakfast woman
- Michel Houellebecq as The owner of the guest house
- Izïa Higelin as The ex of Bruno
- Ovidie as The realtor
- Raymond Defossé as Follin
- Solène Rigot as Jennifer
- Xavier Mathieu as Didier
- Marthe Guérin Caufman as Marie de Picardie
- Madphil as Pipoune
