= De toutes mes forces =

- Directed by: Chad Chenouga
- Written by: Chad Chenouga; Christine Paillard
- Produced by: Miléna Poylo; Gilles Sacuto
- Starring: Khaled Alouach; Yolande Moreau
- Cinematography: Thomas Bataille
- Edited by: Pauline Casalis
- Music by: Thylacine
- Production company: TS production
- Distributed by: Ad Vitam
- Release date: 3 May 2017
- Running time: 98 minutes
- Country: France
- Language: French
- Box office: $744,789

De toutes mes forces is a 2017 French drama film directed by Chad Chenouga.

== Plot ==
Nassim, a 16-year-old boy who is placed with a family in the suburbs following the death of his drug addict mother. But he refuses to integrate into the social setting that surrounds him. He invents another life for himself, similar to that of his mates at the big Parisian high school he goes to. There's no reason for that to change. His two lives, his home life and his school life, must be kept separate at all costs.

== Cast ==
- Khaled Alouach as Nassim
- Zineb Triki as Nassim's mother
- Yolande Moreau as Madame Cousin
- François Guignard as Benjamin
- Jisca Kalvanda as Zawady
- Laurent Xu as Kevin
- Daouda Keita as Moussa
- Aboudou Sacko as Brahim
- Sabri Nouioua as Ryan
- Fadila Belkebla
- Myriam Mansouri
- Chloé Mons
- Elodie Gouraud
- Marine Moal

== Production ==
The movie is shot in Pau, Pyrénées-Atlantiques and Paris, between March and May 2016. The shooting lasted four weeks.
