= Le grand soir (film) =

2012 film

Le Grand Soir
- Film poster
- Directed by: Benoît Delépine; Gustave de Kervern
- Written by: Benoît Delépine; Gustave de Kervern
- Produced by: Jean-Pierre Guérin; André Logie
- Starring: Benoît Poelvoorde; Albert Dupontel
- Cinematography: Hugues Poulain
- Edited by: Stéphane Elmadjian
- Music by: Les Wampas; Brigitte Fontaine
- Distributed by: Ad Vitam (France)
- Release dates: 22 May 2012 (Cannes); 6 June 2012 (France)
- Running time: 92 minutes
- Countries: France; Belgium
- Language: French
- Budget: $3.5 million
- Box office: $2.9 million

Le Grand Soir (English: "The Big Night" French pronunciation: [lə ɡʁɑ̃ swaʁ]) is a 2012 French-Belgian comedy-drama film directed by Benoît Delépine and Gustave de Kervern. The film competed in the Un Certain Regard section at the 2012 Cannes Film Festival where it won the Special Jury Prize and the lead animal actor, Billy Bob, won the Grand Jury Prize, Palm Dog. It won the Magritte Award for Best Costume Design.

== Plot ==
Not is a notorious punk while his brother Jean-Pierre leads a square life as a salesman. One day Not realises that his brother needs some support. Jean-Pierre struggles with his job and also fails when he tries to save his marriage. Not teaches his brother to survive after all.

== Cast ==
- Benoît Poelvoorde as Not
- Albert Dupontel as Jean-Pierre Bonzini
- Brigitte Fontaine as Mother – Marie-Annick Bonzini
- Areski Belkacem as Father – René Bonzini
- Bouli Lanners as the security guard
- Serge Larivière as the director of the 'Grand Litier'
- Stéphanie Pillonca as Jean-Pierre's ex-wife
- Miss Ming as the mute young woman
- Chloé Mons as the punk girl
- Yolande Moreau as the punk girl's mother
- Gérard Depardieu as Juvénal
- Didier Wampas as himself
- Noël Godin as the husband
- Denis Barthe as the barkeeper
