= Gustave Kervern =

French film actor

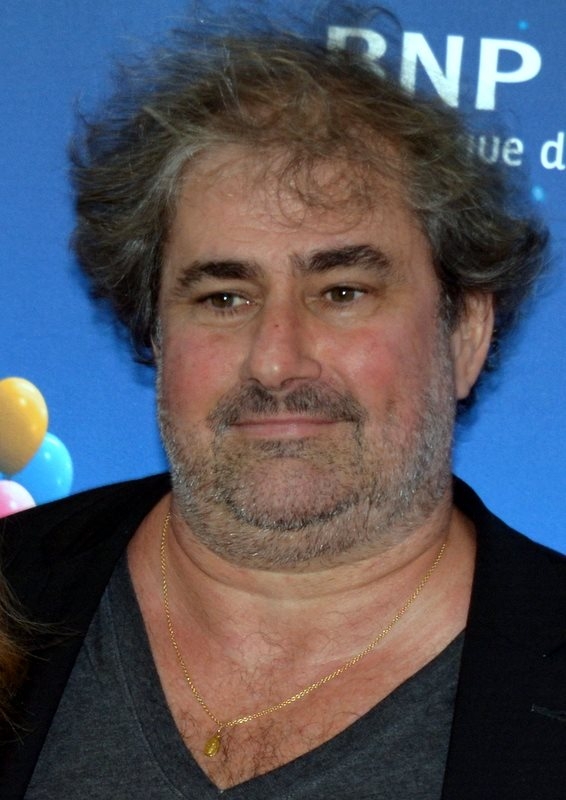
- Kervern in 2014
- Born: 27 August 1962 (age 64); Mauritius
- Occupations: Actor, film director, screenwriter, producer
- Years active: 1996–present
- Spouse: Stéphanie Pillonca
- Children: 2

Gustave Kervern (born 27 August 1962), also known as Gustave de Kervern and Gustave K/Vern, is a French actor, director and screenwriter. He is best known for his collaboration with Benoît Delépine.

== Life and career ==
In 1999, he joined his friend Benoît Delépine, in Groland, a burlesque, satirical comedy sketch show, broadcast on Canal+. It became a cult classic and is still broadcast in 2023, more than thirty years after its creation.

In 2004, he wrote, directed, and starred in Aaltra with Benoît Delépine. Also with Delépine, he has directed and starred in Avida, which was screened out of competition at the 2006 Cannes Film Festival. The duos film Louise-Michel won a Special Jury Prize at the 2009 Sundance Film Festival. Their 2010 film Mammuth starred Gérard Depardieu and Isabelle Adjani. It was nominated for the Golden Bear award at the 60th Berlin International Film Festival.

Their 2012 film Le Grand Soir competed in the Un Certain Regard section at the 2012 Cannes Film Festival where it won the Special Jury Prize.

== Personal life ==
Kervern is married to actress-director Stéphanie Pillonca. They have two children: a boy born in 2002 and a girl born in 2006.

== Filmography ==
=== As actor ===
Year	Title	Role	Director	Notes
1996	Delphine 1, Yvan 0	The waiter	Dominique Farrugia	
1998	Ivre mort pour la patrie		Vincent Hachet	Short
1999	H	Clément Dufresne	Édouard Molinaro	TV series (1 episode)
1999–2023	Groland	Various	Bruno Le Jean, Sylvain Fusée, ...	TV series (1 episode)
2001	Toc toc toc	Gus	Sylvain Fusée	TV mini-series
2002	Patron sur mesure	Pedro	Stéphane Clavier	TV movie
2002	Caméra café	The plumber	Karine Giraud	TV series (2 episodes)
2004	Aaltra	Farmer	Kervern & Delépine	
2006	Avida	Deaf Mute Captive	Kervern & Delépine	
2006	LocKed Out	The policeman	Albert Dupontel	
2008	Louise Hires a Contract Killer	Ship's captain	Kervern & Delépine	
2010	Henry	Van de Breek	Kafka & Pascal Rémy	
2010	Bas-fonds	The lover	Isild Le Besco	
2010	Mammuth	Delicatessen Employee	Kervern & Delépine	
2011	All Together	Funeral Salesman	Stéphane Robelin	
2011	Holidays by the Sea	Green Golfer	Pascal Rabaté	
2012	Nuts	Bertrand	Yann Coridian	
2012	Torpedo	The mechanic	Matthieu Donck	
2012	Bocuse	Eric	Stéphanie Pillonca & Géraldine Renault	Short
2012	Déferlente	The handler	Winifrey Bandera-Guzman & Zoé Delépine	Short
2012	La rentrée des émissions	Machin	Nath Dumont	Short
2012	Mange	Vinnie	Virgile Bramly & Julia Ducournau	TV movie
2014	In the Courtyard	Antoine Le Garrec	Pierre Salvadori	
2014	Near Death Experience	Colleague 2	Kervern & Delépine	
2014	Du goudron et des plumes	Paul Gracineau	Pascal Rabaté	
2014	Vengeance et terre battue	Marius	Mathieu Sapin	Short
2015	Simon	Marc	Emmanuel Caussé & Eric Martin	
2015	Macadam Stories	Sterkowitz	Samuel Benchetrit	
2015	Groland le gros métrage	The inventor	Benoît Delépine & Jules-Édouard Moustic	TV movie
2016	Odd Job	Tom	Pascal Chaumeil	
2016	L'invitation	Philippe	Michaël Cohen	
2016	Saint-Amour	The uncle	Kervern & Delépine	
2016	150 Milligrams	Kermarec	Emmanuelle Bercot	
2016	Fleur de tonnerre	Abbé Riallan	Stéphanie Pillonca	
2016	Cigarettes et chocolat chaud	Denis Patar	Sophie Reine	
2017	Mr. Stein Goes Online	Bernard	Stéphane Robelin	
2017	Cornélius, le meunier hurlant	Mayor Cardamone	Yann Le Quellec	
2018	All About Mothers	Grégoire	Marie-Castille Mention-Schaar	
2019	Poissonsexe	Daniel Luxet	Olivier Babinet	
2019	Les parfums	Arsène Pélissier	Grégory Magne	
2019	Les petits flocons	Sami	Joséphine de Meaux	
2019	Relai	Benoît	Suzanne Clément	Short
2020	Delete History	The other dodo	Kervern & Delépine	
2020	Les sans-dents	The eye-roller	Pascal Rabaté	
2020	Inhuman Resources	Charles Bresson	Ziad Doueiri	TV mini-series
2021	Cette musique ne joue pour personne	Jacky	Samuel Benchetrit	
2021	Capitaine Marleau	Christophe Lemaire	Josée Dayan	TV series (1 episode)
2022	Murder Party	Armand	Nicolas Pleskof	
2022	En même temps	The restaurant owner	Kervern & Delépine	
2023	Rosalie	Paul	Stéphanie Di Giusto	
2023	Sentinelle	Valéry Rocher	Hugo Benamozig & David Caviglioli	
2023	Nouveaux riches		Julien Hollande	
2023	Panda	Messina	Nicolas Cuche & Jérémy Mainguy	TV series (6 episodes)
2023	Drops of God	Philippe Chassangre	Oded Ruskin	TV series (8 episodes)
2024	The Art of Nothing	Bagnoule	Stefan Liberski	
2026	La vénus électrique	Titus	Pierre Salvadori	

=== As filmmaker ===
Year	Title	Credited as			Notes
Year	Title	Director	Screenwriter	Producer	Notes
2004	Aaltra	Yes	Yes		BFI London Film Festival - FIPRESCI Prize; Transilvania International Film Festival - Audience Award; Nominated - Chicago International Film Festival for Gold Hugo; Nominated - International Film Festival Rotterdam for Tiger Award; Nominated - Joseph Plateau Award for Best Belgian Film
2006	Avida	Yes	Yes		
2008	Louise Hires a Contract Killer	Yes	Yes		Prix Jacques Prévert du Scénario for Best Original Screenplay; San Sebastián International Film Festival - Best Screenplay; Sundance Film Festival - Special Jury Prize for Originality (World Cinema Dramatic); Nominated – Lumière Award for Best Screenplay; Nominated - Sydney Film Festival for Best Film
2010	Mammuth	Yes	Yes		Cabourg Film Festival - Coup de Foudre; Nominated – Berlin Film Festival - Golden Bear; Nominated – César Award for Best Film; Nominated – César Award for Best Original Screenplay; Nominated - Gijón International Film Festival for Best Film; Nominated - Odesa International Film Festival - International Competition
2010	Ya basta !	Yes	Yes		Short
2011	Miossec - Chanson Pour Les Amis	Yes	Yes		Music video
2012	Le Grand Soir	Yes	Yes	Yes	Cannes Film Festival - Un Certain Regard Special Jury Prize; Odesa International Film Festival for Best Director; Nominated - Odesa International Film Festival - International Competition; Nominated - Warsaw Film Festival for Free Spirit Award
2014	Near Death Experience	Yes	Yes	Yes	Nominated - Buenos Aires International Festival of Independent Cinema - Best Feature Film - Avant-Garde and Genre; Nominated – Venice Film Festival - Horizons Award
2016	Saint-Amour	Yes	Yes	Yes	Nominated - Edinburgh International Film Festival - Best International Feature Film
2016	Fleur de tonnerre		Yes		
2018	I Feel Good	Yes	Yes	Yes	Nominated - Festival du nouveau cinéma - People's Choice Award; Nominated - Locarno Film Festival - Variety Piazza Grande Award
2020	Delete History	Yes	Yes	Yes	Berlin Film Festival - Special Jury Prize; Nominated – Berlin Film Festival - Golden Bear; Nominated – César Award for Best Original Screenplay; Nominated - Lisbon & Estoril Film Festival - Best Film; Nominated - Seville European Film Festival - Best Film
2020	Mords-les	Yes	Yes	Yes	Short
2022	En même temps	Yes	Yes	Yes	
2024	Je ne me laisserai plus faire	Yes	Yes	Yes	Post-Production; TV movie
