= Benoît Delépine =

French actor

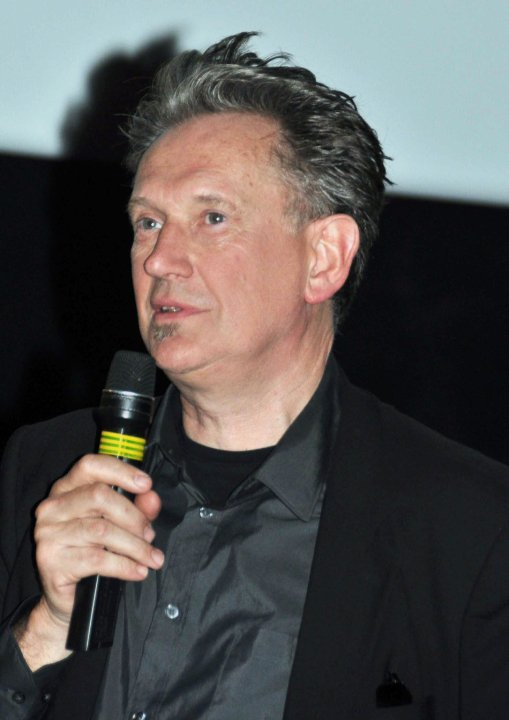
- Delépine in 2010
- Born: 30 August 1958 (age 67); Saint-Quentin, Aisne, France
- Occupations: Comedian, screenwriter, film director, actor, producer
- Years active: 1974–present

Benoît Delépine (French pronunciation: [dəlepin]; born 30 August 1958) is a French comedian and film director. He is known for his satirical activities on TV channel Canal+.

Director of the TV program Guignols de l'info for many years, he currently writes TV programs about the fictional country of Groland. He also plays the cynical journalist-reporter Mickael Kael.

In the cinema, Delépine has written and performed in two films. Michael Kael contre la World News Company, a chess commercial, reprising two elements of the fictional career of the director: his role as a reporter for Groland and the World Company, which he contributed to create for Les Guignols.

In 2004, Aaltra, which he wrote, directed, and starred in with Gustave Kervern enjoyed critical success. The two companions from the Groland adventure wrote and directed it as a road movie where two enemies travel the roads of northern France and Finland following an accident. With Kervern, he also directed and starred in Avida, which was awarded screened out of competition at the 2006 Cannes Film Festival. His 2010 film Mammuth was nominated for the Golden Bear at the 60th Berlin International Film Festival.

His 2012 film Le grand soir competed in the Un Certain Regard section at the 2012 Cannes Film Festival where it won the Special Jury Prize.

== Filmography ==
=== As filmmaker ===
Year	Title	Credited as			Notes
Year	Title	Director	Screenwriter	Producer	Notes
2004	Aaltra	Yes	Yes		BFI London Film Festival - FIPRESCI Prize; Transilvania International Film Festival - Audience Award
2006	Avida	Yes	Yes		
2008	Louise Hires a Contract Killer	Yes	Yes		Amiens International Film Festival - Audience Award; Prix Jacques Prévert du Scénario for Best Original Screenplay; San Sebastián International Film Festival - Best Screenplay; Sundance Film Festival - Special Jury Prize for Originality (World Cinema Dramatic); Nominated—Lumière Award for Best Screenplay
2010	Comme un chien	Yes	Yes	Yes	Short film; co-producer
2010	Mammuth	Yes	Yes		Cabourg Film Festival - Coup de Foudre; Nominated—Berlin Film Festival - Golden Bear; Nominated—César Award for Best Film; Nominated—César Award for Best Original Screenplay
2012	Le Grand Soir	Yes	Yes	Yes	Cannes Film Festival - Un Certain Regard Special Jury Prize
2014	Enfin la fin	Yes	Yes		Short film
2014	Ablations		Yes	Yes	
2014	Near Death Experience	Yes	Yes	Yes	Nominated—Venice Film Festival - Horizons Award
2016	Saint-Amour	Yes	Yes	Yes	
2018	I Feel Good	Yes	Yes	Yes	
2020	Delete History	Yes	Yes	Yes	
2022	En même temps	Yes	Yes	Yes	
