= Catherine Jacob (actress) =

French actress (born 1956)

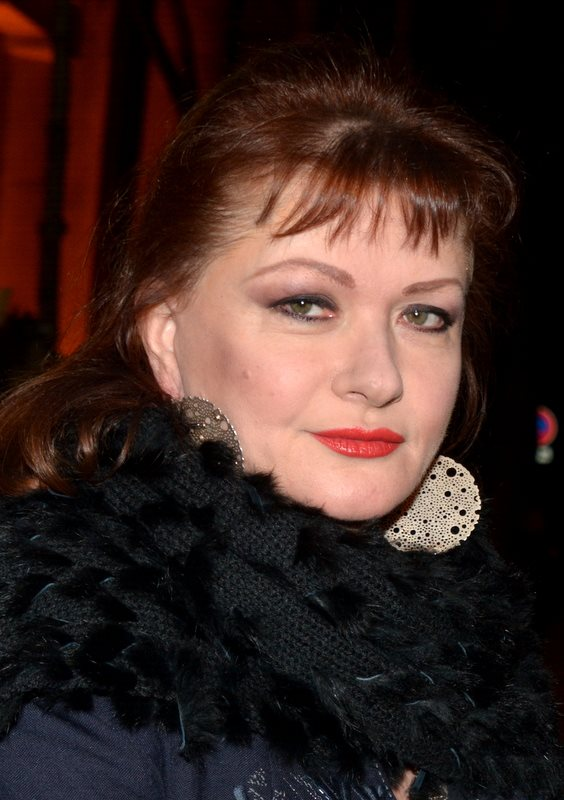
- Catherine Jacob at the 2015 Lumière Awards ceremony
- Born: 16 December 1956 (age 69); Paris, France
- Occupation: Actress
- Years active: 1980–present

Catherine Jacob (born 16 December 1956) is a French film and theatre actress who has won a César Award for her role in Life Is a Long Quiet River (1988), and was nominated for Best Supporting Actress in Tatie Danielle (1990), Merci la vie (1991) and Neuf mois (1994). She has been two-time president of the Lumière Awards. She is known for her voice and her charisma.

== Early life ==
Born in Paris on 16 December 1956, Catherine Jacob spent part of her childhood and adolescence in Compiègne, where she was educated at primary school and then Pierre d'Ailly High School. Her father was a dental surgeon and her mother an orthodontist. She has a younger brother.

== Career ==
=== 1980–1987: Beginnings ===
After obtaining a diploma in architecture, Catherine Jacob moved to Paris. From 1978 to 1980, she studied acting at the Cours Florent, then located on Saint Louis Island.

She started to act in the early 1980s as an extra in movies like Swann in Love by Volker Schlöndorff (1984), Les Nanas by Annick Lanoë (1985), State of Grace by Jacques Rouffio (1986) and Malady of Love by Jacques Deray (1987). She also appeared in TV movies and TV series like Dickie-roi by Guy Lefranc, Toutes griffes dehors by Michel Boisrond, Julien Fontanes, magistrat, Marie Pervenche, Sentiments and Qui c'est ce garçon ? by Nadine Trintignant in minor roles.

In 1985, she wrote and starred in her first one-woman show called Welcome to the Club, directed by Rémi Chenylle, drawing eleven portraits of characters. She appeared in several festivals with her show and toured with it the following year.

=== 1988–1997: César and success ===
In 1988, she played Marie-Thérèse in the cult film Life Is a Long Quiet River by Étienne Chatiliez. The movie was a huge success, and Jacob won the César Award for Most Promising Actress. She also played in the TV miniseries Le vent des moissons alongside Annie Girardot. That same year, she and Jacques Bonnaffé also had a huge success with the play Paris-Nord - Attractions pour noces et banquets. It was planned to be shown only for 10 nights, but due to the success, the play continued for three years.

In 1989, she continued her tour with the play Paris-Nord - Attractions pour noces et banquets. She got a supporting role in Les Maris, les Femmes, les Amants by Pascal Thomas, with Jean-François Stévenin and Michel Robin. She starred in two TV movies: L'été de la révolution with Bruno Cremer and Brigitte Fossey and Le vagabond de la Bastille by Michel Andrieu. She also appeared in an episode of the TV series Imogène with Dominique Lavanant.

In 1990, she ended her tour with the play Paris-Nord - Attractions pour noces et banquets after three years. She appeared in the second movie of the director Étienne Chatiliez, Tatie Danielle with Tsilla Chelton, Isabelle Nanty and Karin Viard. It was shown at the Toronto International Film Festival. The movie was again a big success at the box office, well received by the critics and became a cult movie. Jacob was nominated for the César Award for Best Supporting Actress.

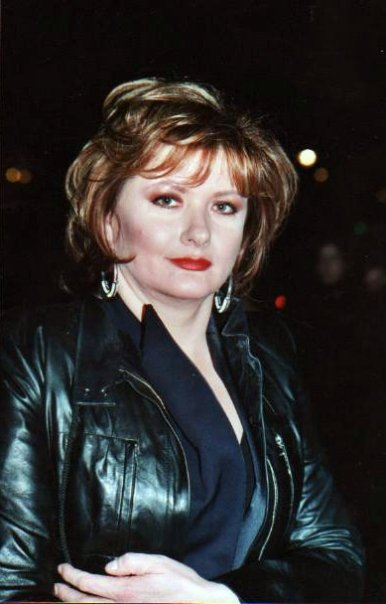
Catherine Jacob at the 27th César Awards

In 1991, she starred in The Imaginary Invalid by Molière, directed by Hans-Peter Cloos at the Théâtre national de Chaillot. She had a supporting role in Merci la vie by Bertrand Blier, alongside Charlotte Gainsbourg, Anouk Grinberg, Michel Blanc, Jean Carmet, Annie Girardot, Jean-Louis Trintignant and Gérard Depardieu. Jacob was nominated for her third César Award for Best Supporting Actress. She appeared in My Father the Hero by Gérard Lauzier, with Gérard Depardieu, Marie Gillain and Charlotte de Turckheim. She was also in the short Contes à rebours, directed by Gilles Porte.

In 1992, she starred in two new plays: Ubu Roi by Alfred Jarry, directed by Roland Topor at the Théâtre national de Chaillot, and Chambres by Philippe Minyana, directed by Hans-Peter Cloos at the Théâtre Paris-Villette. She played Rose in La Fille de l'air by Maroun Bagdadi, with Béatrice Dalle, Hippolyte Girardot and Jean-Claude Dreyfus. She also acted in Bella vista by Alfredo Arias, with Wadeck Stanczak. Jacob was in three shorts: Tout petit déjà by David Carayon, O mon amour with Artus de Penguern and Cocon by Martin Provost.

In 1993, she starred in the successful La Soif de l'or by Gérard Oury, with Tsilla Chelton and Christian Clavier. She appeared in the short Stella plage with Dominique Pinon and in the TV movie L'Éternel Mari by Denys Granier-Deferre, with Roger Hanin and Macha Méril.

In 1994, she played Dominique in the cult film Neuf mois by Patrick Braoudé, with Daniel Russo. Jacob was again nominated for the César Award for Best Supporting Actress. She had the leading role in Les Braqueuses by Jean-Paul Salomé, with Clémentine Célarié and in Oh God, Women Are So Loving by Magali Clément, with Mathieu Carrière. She acted in the TV movie Le jardin des plantes by Philippe de Broca, with Claude Rich. She also starred in a new play written and directed by Victor Lanoux called Drame au Concert, with Roland Giraud. She and Lanoux didn't get along at all, and she called him a "filthy guy" and "a shithead", but was forced by her contract to do 130 performances. She recalled the experience as "a nightmare" and regretted having accepted the role, since she had to refuse the role of "La Pinthade" in Chantecler directed by Jérôme Savary with whom she would later work with.

In 1995, she worked for the third time with director Étienne Chatiliez in the big success Happiness Is in the Field, alongside Michel Serrault, Eddy Mitchell, Sabine Azéma and Carmen Maura. She was also in the TV movie Les maîtresses de mon mari with Marie-Christine Barrault.

In 1996, she came back to the theater with Le Bourgeois gentilhomme by Molière, directed by Jérôme Savary, at the Théâtre national de Chaillot. She played the diva Carla Milo in Les Grands Ducs by Patrice Leconte, with Jean-Pierre Marielle, Philippe Noiret, Jean Rochefort and Michel Blanc. She starred in the movie Oui by Alexandre Jardin, with Dany Boon, Jean-Marie Bigard and Claire Keim, and in Let's Hope it Lasts with Ticky Holgado and Gérard Darmon. She was in two shorts: Un bel après-midi d'été by Artus de Penguern and Ultima hora with François Berléand. She also made two TV movies, Sur un air de mambo by Jean-Louis Bertucelli, for which she became the first French woman to win the Golden Goblet Award for Best Actress, and Barrage sur l'Orénoque with Elizabeth Bourgine and Georges Corraface.

In 1997, she was in Messieurs les enfants, with Pierre Arditi, François Morel, Zinedine Soualem and Michel Aumont, in XXL by Ariel Zeitoun, with Michel Boujenah, Gérard Depardieu, Elsa Zylberstein, Emmanuelle Riva and Gad Elmaleh, and in La ballade de Titus with Jean-Claude Dreyfus and Antoine Duléry. She also had the leading role in two TV movies: Maintenant ou jamais with Daniel Russo, Samy Naceri and Chantal Lauby and La vie à trois with Aurélien Recoing.

=== 1998–2011: Television and festivals ===
In 1998, she was cast in Let There Be Light by Arthur Joffé, an ensemble comedy. She was in three TV movies: Théo et Marie with Véronique Jannot, Qui mange qui ? with Julien Guiomar and Maintenant et pour toujours with Marisa Berenson, Marlène Jobert and Agathe de La Boulaye. She also appeared in an episode of Chercheur d'héritiers with Bernadette Lafont.

In 1999, she played in the TV movie Fleurs de sel with François Berléand and Frédéric Pierrot. She appeared in one episode of the TV series Marc Eliot, directed by Josée Dayan. She came back to the theater after 3 years, with The Miser by Molière, directed by Jérôme Savary at the Théâtre des Célestins. She was invited to present an award at the 13th Molière Awards.

In 2000, she toured France with The Miser by Molière. She starred in Le coeur à l'ouvrage, with Mathilde Seigner and Amira Casar. She had the leading role in two TV movies: La Double Vie de Jeanne with Micheline Presle and Christine Citti, and Les faux-fuyants, with Arielle Dombasle and Nicolas Vaude.

In 2001, she had the leading role in the movie J'ai faim !!!, directed by Florence Quentin, with Michèle Laroque. The movie was shown during the Yokohama French Film Festival in Japan. She starred in the movie God Is Great and I'm Not with Audrey Tautou, Édouard Baer, Julie Depardieu, Philippe Laudenbach and Thierry Neuvic. It was screened at the Seattle International Film Festival. She was also in the short La concierge est dans l'ascenseur, with Michel Vuillermoz, Omar Sy and Fred Testot.

In 2002, she starred in the TV movies La torpille, with Pierre Cassignard and the sequel of Qui mange qui ?, called Qui mange quoi ?, directed by Jean-Paul Lilienfeld. Jacob also lent her voice to the animated TV miniseries Corto Maltese, with Richard Berry, Patrick Bouchitey and Marie Trintignant.

In 2003, she appeared in Who Killed Bambi?, directed by Gilles Marchand, with Sophie Quinton, Laurent Lucas, Yasmine Belmadi, Valérie Donzelli and Joséphine de Meaux. The movie was screened at the Cannes Film Festival, the Toronto International Film Festival, the Seattle International Film Festival and other festivals. She starred in two TV movies: L'adieu, with Thomas Jouannet, Mélanie Doutey, Gilles Lellouche, Jean Benguigui, and Cécile Cassel, and L'île atlantique by Gérard Mordillat. Jacob was a member of the jury at the Festival international du film fantastique de Gérardmer, presided by William Friedkin.

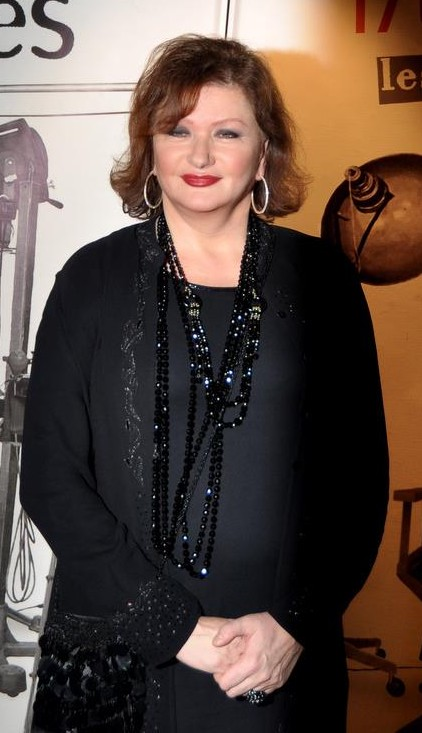
Catherine Jacob presided at the 17th Lumière Awards.

In 2004, she was in The First Time I Turned Twenty by Lorraine Lévy, with Marilou Berry, Serge Riaboukine, Pierre Arditi, Raphaël Personnaz and Michel Vuillermoz. The movie was presented at the San Francisco Jewish Film Festival, the San Diego Jewish Film Festival and the Women Make Waves Festival. She had a role in the animated short La Méthode Bourchnikov with Lorànt Deutsch, Dieudonné and Daniel Prévost. The short was presented at the Clermont-Ferrand International Short Film Festival, the CFC Worldwide Short Film Festival and several others. It was nominated for the César Award for Best Short Film. She had the leading role in the third and last of the "Qui mange...?" series of TV movies entitled Qui mange quand ?, directed by Jean-Paul Lilienfeld. She also starred in the TV movie Joe Pollox et les mauvais esprits with Pascal Légitimus and Laurent Lafitte and in the TV miniseries Colette, une femme libre directed by Nadine Trintignant, with Marie Trintignant and Lambert Wilson. She began a new TV series, Clara et associés, directed by Gérard Marx, with François Berléand and Antoine Duléry.

In 2005, she starred in Quartier V.I.P. by Laurent Firode, with Johnny Hallyday, Pascal Légitimus, Valeria Bruni Tedeschi, François Berléand and Jean-Claude Brialy. She had roles in three TV movies: Une vie by Élisabeth Rappeneau, with Wladimir Yordanoff and Barbara Schulz, Louise, with Huguette Oligny and Désiré Landru with Patrick Timsit and Danièle Lebrun. She also appeared in an episode of the TV series Vénus & Apollon with Zinedine Soualem and Maria de Medeiros. She was a member of the jury of the 16th Valenciennes Film Festival. and she was invited to the Marrakech International Film Festival.

In 2006, she was in Dikkenek with Jean-Luc Couchard, Dominique Pinon, Marion Cotillard, Mélanie Laurent, Jérémie Renier, Florence Foresti and François Damiens and in Les Aristos by Charlotte de Turckheim, with Jacques Weber, Urbain Cancelier, Armelle, Victoria Abril and Rossy de Palma. She starred in four TV movies: Comment lui dire by Laurent Firode, Mes parents chéris with Adriana Asti and Michel Aumont, L'enfant d'une autre with Arly Jover and Olivier Marchal and Le Soldat rose with Matthieu Chedid, Louis Chedid, Alain Souchon, Vanessa Paradis and Francis Cabrel. She also appeared in the TV miniseries Le Cri with Francis Renaud, Jacques Bonnaffé, Dominique Blanc, Yolande Moreau and François Morel. She was a member of the jury of the 20th Cabourg Film Festival.

In 2007, she came back to the theater after a seven year break with the play Jusqu'à ce que la mort nous sépare by Rémi de Vos, directed by Éric Vigner, at the Théâtre du Rond-Point. She was in the short Kozak, directed by Olivier Fox, with Fred Testot. She was invited to present two awards during the 32nd César Awards ceremony. She was also on stage for the Victoires de la Musique, singing with the band Le Soldat Rose. She was invited to give the Prix Cine Romen alongside Claude Lelouch and Pierre Lescure.

In 2008, she starred in a new play, Célibataires by David Foenkinos, directed by Anouche Setbon, at the Théâtre des Champs-Élysées. She starred in the drama Behind the Walls, directed by Christian Faure, with Carole Bouquet, François Damiens, Michel Jonasz, Guillaume Gouix and Pascal N'Zonzi. It was the first movie shown at the City of Lights, City of Angels Festival. She played in 48 heures par jour by Catherine Castel, with Aure Atika, Antoine de Caunes, Victoria Abril, Bernadette Lafont and Aurore Clément. She also had the leading part in the TV movie La Maison Tellier, directed by Élisabeth Rappeneau, with Bruno Lochet and Sophie Quinton. She also lent her voice to Brigitte, the teacher of Eliot Kid, in the first season of the eponymous TV series. She was a member of the jury of the 15th Festival international du film fantastique de Gérardmer. She was invited to the third ceremony of the Raimu of Comedy.

In 2009, she appeared in the short L'arbre à clous, directed by Fabrice Couchard, which was presented at the Brussels International Independent Film Festival. She was invited by the organisers of the 23rd Molière Awards ceremony to present the Best Supporting Actress with Michel Vuillermoz. She was invited to give the Prix Cine Romen for the second time, alongside Patrice Leconte and Jean-Pierre Marielle.

In 2010, she played Chantal in Thelma, Louise et Chantal, with Jane Birkin, Caroline Cellier, Thierry Lhermitte, Michèle Bernier, Alysson Paradis and Micheline Presle. The movie premiered at the Alpe d'Huez Film Festival and was also screened during the Edinburgh International Film Festival. She starred in Streamfield, les carnets noirs, with Bernard Le Coq, Jean-Pierre Castaldi and Pierre Arditi. She had roles in two TV movies: Notre Dame des Barjots with Zabou Breitman and Pierre Cassignard and He's the One... Or Not with Delphine Chanéac and Sagamore Stévenin. For the third time, she was invited to give the Prix Cine Romen alongside Marie-Anne Chazel and Jean-Loup Dabadie. She was a part of the ceremony at the Ministry of Culture in Paris honoring her friend Daniel Russo. She was a member of the jury during the 10th Monte Carlo Comedy Film Festival.

In 2011, she had a supporting role in Roses à crédit, directed by Amos Gitai, with Léa Seydoux, Grégoire Leprince-Ringuet, Pierre Arditi, Arielle Dombasle, Valeria Bruni Tedeschi, Florence Thomassin, André Wilms, Ariane Ascaride and Elsa Zylberstein. The movie was presented at the Toronto International Film Festival, the São Paulo International Film Festival and the Morelia International Film Festival. She starred in the horror movie Livid directed by Julien Maury and Alexandre Bustillo, with Félix Moati, Marie-Claude Pietragalla and Béatrice Dalle. The movie premiered at the Toronto International Film Festival, and was presented at several festivals, such as the Strasbourg European Fantastic Film Festival, the Fantastic Fest and the Screamfest Horror Film Festival. She appeared in three TV movies: Gérald K. Gérald by Élisabeth Rappeneau, with François Morel and Armelle, Le Grand Restaurant II with Line Renaud and Le client with Gérard Darmon. She was invited to the Chaumet's Cocktail Party for César's Revelations 2011 where she supported Arthur Dupont, and a couple weeks later, she was invited to announce the nominees. She was a member of the jury during the 16th International Film Festival of Young Directors with Myriam Boyer, Virginie Efira and Stéphane Brizé. She also hosted the 50th Gala des Artistes.

=== 2012–present: Theater, television and cinema ===
In 2012, she played in two TV movies: À dix minutes des naturistes, directed by Stéphane Clavier, with Lionel Abelanski, Christine Citti and Macha Méril, and La Baie d'Alger, screened at the Alès Film Festival, directed by Merzak Allouache, with Biyouna, Jean Benguigui and Michèle Moretti. She also appeared in three episodes of the TV series Victoire Bonnot, with Valérie Damidot. She was chosen to preside at the 17th Lumière Awards.

In 2013, she returned to the theater after five years, touring with the play Le voyageur sans bagage by Jean Anouilh, directed by Alain Fromager and Gwendoline Hamon. She starred in two TV movies: Je vous présente ma femme, directed by Élisabeth Rappeneau, with Michel Robin and Les Vieux Calibres with Danièle Lebrun, Michel Aumont, Roger Dumas and Jean-Luc Bideau. She had two recurring roles in two TV series: Vive la colo ! with Virginie Hocq, Titoff, Julien Boisselier and Luce for four episodes, and La Famille Katz with Julie Depardieu and Serge Hazanavicius for six episodes. She also made an advertisement for LCL S.A.

In 2014, she played two supporting roles in two movies: L'Ex de ma vie with Géraldine Nakache and Kim Rossi Stuart, and Lili Rose with Mehdi Dehbi. She also starred in the TV movie Tout est permis, directed by Émilie Deleuze, with Judith Chemla. She appeared in a couple of episodes of Scènes de ménages, playing the daughter of Marion Game and Gérard Hernandez's characters. She has also shot advertisements for Canalsat.

In 2015, she starred in two TV movies: Lettre à France directed by Stéphane Clavier, with Julie Ferrier and Merci pour tout, Charles with Charlotte de Turckheim and Claudia Tagbo for France 2. She also appeared in two episodes of the TV series Nos chers voisins for TF1. Catherine Jacob was also on stage with Madame in which she played a prostitute who tells her memoirs. She was alone on stage and her performance was hailed by critics. She was also part of the show Elles se croient toutes Joly with other actresses paying tribute to the comedian Sylvie Joly. In April, she read on stage some letters written by deportees of the Royallieu-Compiègne internment camp.

In 2016, she appeared in Joséphine s'arrondit, directed by Marilou Berry. She also starred in three TV movies: Murders at Avignon, with Lætitia Milot for France 3, Baisers cachés with Patrick Timsit, and 3 Mariages et 1 coup de foudre with Helena Noguerra and Mylène Demongeot for France 2. In the theater, she appeared in L'impresario delle Smirne written by Carlo Goldoni, with Nicolas Vaude. She also joined the TV show Conseil d'indiscipline, broadcast on Paris Première and hosted by Jean-Louis Debré, for which she was a columnist for a couple of shows. In April, she was the godmother of the 19th Dinard Comedy Festival.

In 2017, she starred as Queen Titania in Un jour mon prince! with Hugo Becker and in the comedy Baby Bumps with Juliette Binoche. She also played Agnès Dorgelle in This Is Our Land, directed by Lucas Belvaux, with Émilie Dequenne, André Dussollier and Guillaume Gouix. The film was slated to be released two months before the first round of the presidential elections in France and directly targeted the National Front. The character portrayed by Catherine Jacob was said to strongly resemble Marine Le Pen, and members of the political party saw the film as an affront. Steeve Briois, the FN mayor of Hénin-Beaumont tweeted: "Poor Marine Le Pen, who is caricatured by this tobacco pot of Catherine Jacob. A damn turnip in perspective!" Florian Philippot, another member of the FN declared: "According to the trailer that I saw [...], it looks like a nice turnip, but, beyond the quality of the film, I find it really scandalous that in the presidential election campaign, I believe precisely two months before the vote, a film is released in French cinemas that is clearly anti-National Front. [...] It disturbs me on behalf of Catherine Jacob. I was a fan of Catherine Jacob. There, I love her very much, but for me she is spoiled. Why? For some money, for a César Award, for a little chocolate medal that will be given, for service rendered to the system?" Jacob said in response: "The stupid reaction of the National Front is a gift. It proves our point...".

Later in 2017, she returned to the stage with the play Madame for a successful tour. That same year, she also starred in the leading role of the adaptation of Un fil à la patte, written by Georges Feydeau and directed by Christophe Lidon, who directed her the year before, in L'impresario delle Smirne. This was a new success, and the play was back on stage with Jacob in May 2018 at the Théâtre Montparnasse.

In August and September 2017, she shot a new TV miniseries for France 3 called Les impatientes with Noémie Lvovsky and Thierry Godard. She also starred in To Each, Her Own produced by Netflix, with Julia Piaton and Richard Berry.

From October 7 to 14, she was one of the jury members of the festival Arte Mare. From December 7 to 10, she was a member of the jury at the 2nd Liège International Comedy Film Festival, alongside Gérard Darmon and Frédéric Diefenthal.

In 2018, she was a spokesperson for IMAGYN during their campaign to encourage cervical cancer screening. She appeared in an episode of the fourth season of Nina, and also in an episode of Hitchcock by Mocky directed by Jean-Pierre Mocky, for France 2 and France 3. That same year she played "The Fairy Godmother" for 8 short films entitled "La Fabuleuse Histoire des Caisses d'Epargne" explaining the creation and the evolution of the Groupe Caisse d'Épargne.

On October 15, 2018, Christophe Barratier and Sam Bobino, co-presidents of the Festival du cinéma et de la musique de La Baule, revealed the composition of the jury that would be chaired by Catherine Jacob. Jacob was surrounded by the actresses Audrey Fleurot and Axelle Laffont, as well as the composers Mathieu Lamboley, Philippe Kelly and Alex Jaffray. The festival ran from 6-11 November.

In 2019, she co-wrote her first book called Hommes/Femmes, ce qu'elles en disent with Franck Leclerc. In March, she received the title of Commander des Ordres des Arts et des Lettres by the French government for her significant contribution to the enrichment of the French cultural inheritance.

== Theater ==
Year	Title	Author	Director
1985–86	Welcome to the Club	Catherine Jacob	Rémi Chenylle
1988–91	Paris-Nord, attractions pour Noces et Banquets	Jacques Bonnaffé	Jacques Bonnaffé
1990–91	The Imaginary Invalid	Molière	Hans-Peter Cloos
1992	Ubu roi	Alfred Jarry	Roland Topor
1992	Chambres	Philippe Minyana	Hans-Peter Cloos
1994–95	Drame au concert	Victor Lanoux	Victor Lanoux
1996	Le Bourgeois gentilhomme	Molière	Jérôme Savary
1999–2000	The Miser	Molière	Jérôme Savary
2006–07	Jusqu'à ce que la mort nous sépare	Rémi de Vos	Éric Vigner
2008–09	Célibataires	David Foenkinos	Anouche Setbon
2013	Le voyageur sans bagage	Jean Anouilh	Gwendoline Hamon & Alain Fromager
2015–17	Madame	Rémi De Vos	Rémi De Vos
2016	L'impresario delle Smirne	Carlo Goldoni	Christophe Lidon
2017–18	Un fil à la patte	Georges Feydeau	Christophe Lidon
2021–22	Papy fait de la résistance	Christian Clavier & Martin Lamotte	Serge Postigo
2022	Un fil à la patte	Georges Feydeau	Christophe Lidon
2023–24	Agathe Royale	Jean-Benoît Patricot	Christophe Lidon

== Filmography ==
=== Cinema ===
Year	Title	Role	Director
1984	Swann in Love	Uncredited	Volker Schlöndorff
1984	Souvenirs, Souvenirs	The postmaster	Ariel Zeitoun
1985	The Chicks	A gym-center client	Annick Lanoë
1987	Malady of Love	Nurse	Jacques Deray
1988	Life Is a Long Quiet River	Marie-Thérèse	Étienne Chatiliez
1989	Les Maris, les Femmes, les Amants	Marie-Françoise Tocanier	Pascal Thomas
1990	Tatie Danielle	Catherine Billiard	Étienne Chatiliez
1991	Thank You, Life	Evangéline Pelleveau	Bertrand Blier
1991	My Father the Hero	Christelle	Gérard Lauzier
1991	Contes à rebours		Gilles Porte
1992	Bella Vista		Alfredo Arias
1992	The Girl in the Air	Rose	Maroun Bagdadi
1992	Cocon		Martin Provost
1992	Tout petit déjà	The seller	David Carayon
1992	O mon amour	The woman	Paul Minthe
1993	La Soif de l'or	Fleurette	Gérard Oury
1993	Stella plage	The woman	Elisabeth Prouvost
1994	Nine Months	Dominique	Patrick Braoudé
1994	Girls with Guns	Cécile Lambardant	Jean-Paul Salomé
1994	Oh God, Women Are So Loving	Anne	Magali Clément
1995	Happiness Is in the Field	Lolotte André	Étienne Chatiliez
1996	Oui	Nathalie	Alexandre Jardin
1996	The Grand Dukes	Carla Milo	Patrice Leconte
1996	Let's Hope it Lasts	Christine Ponty	Michel Thibaud
1996	Ultima hora	The woman	Laurence Meynard
1996	Un bel après-midi d'été	Solange	Artus de Penguern
1997	XXL	Lorène Benguigui	Ariel Zeitoun
1997	La ballade de Titus	Louise	Vincent de Brus
1997	Messieurs les enfants	Yolande	Pierre Boutron
1998	Let There Be Light	God Suzanne	Arthur Joffé
2000	Le coeur à l'ouvrage	Françoise	Laurent Dussaux
2001	J'ai faim !!!	Lily	Florence Quentin
2001	God Is Great and I'm Not	Evelyne	Pascale Bailly
2001	La concierge est dans l'ascenseur		Olivier Coussemacq
2003	Who Killed Bambi?	Véronique	Gilles Marchand
2003	Hansel et Gretel		Cyril Paris
2004	The First Time I Turned Twenty	Madame Goldman	Lorraine Lévy
2004	La Méthode Bourchnikov	Sylvette Martin	Grégoire Sivan
2005	Quartier V.I.P.	Louisette	Laurent Firode
2006	Dikkenek	Sylvie	Olivier Van Hoofstadt
2006	Les aristos	Marie-Claude Saumur Chantilly	Charlotte de Turckheim
2007	Kozak	France	Olivier Fox
2008	48 Hours a Day	Laura	Catherine Castel
2008	Behind the Walls	The director	Christian Faure
2009	L'arbre à clous	La Gate	Fabrice Couchard
2010	Thelma, Louise et Chantal	Chantal	Benoît Pétré
2010	Streamfield, les carnets noirs	Judge Soren	Jean-Luc Miesch
2011	Livid	Catherine Wilson	Julien Maury & Alexandre Bustillo
2011	Roses à crédit	Madame Donzert	Amos Gitai
2014	Lili Rose	Pierrot's sister	Bruno Ballouard
2014	L'ex de ma vie	Daphné	Dorothée Sebbagh
2016	Joséphine, Pregnant & Fabulous	Anne de Bauvallet	Marilou Berry
2017	Baby Bumps	Irène	Noémie Saglio
2017	This Is Our Land	Agnès Dorgelle	Lucas Belvaux
2017	Un jour mon prince !	Queen Titania	Flavia Coste
2018	To Each, Her Own	Noëlle Benloulou	Myriam Aziza
2022	Rumba Therapy	Josy	Franck Dubosc

=== Television ===
Year	Title	Role	Director	Notes
1980–83	Julien Fontanes, magistrat	Dany	François Dupont-Midy & Guy Lefranc	TV series (2 episodes)
1981	Dickie-roi	Anne-Marie	Guy Lefranc	TV mini-series
1982	L'esprit de famille	Marie-Agnès	Roland-Bernard	TV series (1 episode)
1984	Marie Pervenche	A traffic warden	Claude Boissol	TV series (3 episodes)
1987	Qui c'est ce garçon?	The secretary	Nadine Trintignant	TV mini-series
1987	Sentiments	Lise	Joyce Buñuel	TV series (1 episode)
1988	Le vent des moissons	Nicole's friend	Jean Sagols	TV mini-series
1988	Les Cinq Dernières Minutes	Patricia Lecorre	Gérard Gozlan	TV series (1 episode)
1989	L'été de la révolution	Madame Lecoeur	Lazare Iglésis	TV movie
1989	Le vagabond de la Bastille	Madame Croquejus	Michel Andrieu	TV movie
1989	Marie Antoinette, reine d'un seul amour	Rose Bertin	Caroline Huppert	TV movie
1989	Imogène	Yvette Bougrain	François Leterrier	TV series (1 episode)
1993	L'Éternel Mari	Maryse Saussois	Denys Granier-Deferre	TV movie
1994	Tales from the Zoo	Micheline	Philippe de Broca	TV movie
1995	Les maîtresses de mon mari	Nora	Christiane Lehérissey	TV movie
1996	The Orinoco Dam	Arlette Legrand	Juan Luis Buñuel	TV movie
1996	Sur un air de mambo	Arlette	Jean-Louis Bertucelli	TV movie
1997	La vie à trois	Charlotte	Christiane Lehérissey	TV movie
1997	Maintenant ou jamais	Delphine	Jérôme Foulon	TV movie
1998	Théo et Marie	Marcelle	Henri Helman	TV movie
1998	Qui mange qui ?	Rose Lantier	Dominique Tabuteau	TV movie
1998	Maintenant et pour toujours	Hélène	Joël Santoni & Daniel Vigne	TV movie
1998	Chercheur d'héritiers	Véronique Coulange	Olivier Langlois	TV series (1 episode)
1999	Fleurs de sel	Madeleine de Renoncourt	Arnaud Sélignac	TV movie
1999	Marc Eliot	The director	Josée Dayan	TV series (1 episode)
2000	Les faux-fuyants	Diane Lessing	Pierre Boutron	TV movie
2000	La Double Vie de Jeanne	Jeanne Malaterre	Henri Helman	TV movie
2001	Caméra Café	The architect	Yvan Le Bolloc'h	TV series (1 episode)
2002	La Torpille	Dominique Dumas	Luc Boland	TV movie
2002	Qui mange quoi ?	Rose Lantier	Jean-Paul Lilienfeld	TV movie
2002	Corto Maltese	Ambiguity / Marianne	Richard Danto & Liam Saury	TV mini-series
2003	L'adieu	Georgette	François Luciani	TV movie
2003	Atlantic Island	Chantal Seignelet	Gérard Mordillat	TV movie
2004	Qui mange quand ?	Rose Lantier	Jean-Paul Lilienfeld	TV movie
2004	Clara et associés	Clara Delvaux	Gérard Marx	TV movie
2004	Joe Pollox et les mauvais esprits	Julie	Jérôme Foulon	TV movie
2004	Colette, une femme libre	Missy	Nadine Trintignant	TV mini-series
2005	Louise	Joanne	Jacques Renard	TV movie
2005	Une vie	Adélaïde	Élisabeth Rappeneau	TV movie
2005	Désiré Landru	Madame Marchadier	Pierre Boutron	TV movie
2005	Vénus & Apollon	Brigitte	Olivier Guignard	TV series (1 episode)
2006	Le Soldat rose	The Voice	Jean-Louis Cap	TV movie
2006	This Girl Is Mine	Maud Kert	Virginie Wagon	TV movie
2006	Comment lui dire	Marie-Claude	Laurent Firode	TV movie
2006	Mes parents chéris	Marie Amato	Philomène Esposito	TV movie
2006	Le Cri	Renée Panaud	Hervé Baslé	TV mini-series
2008	La Maison Tellier	Odile Tellier	Élisabeth Rappeneau	TV movie
2008	Eliot Kid	Brigitte	Gilles Cazaux	TV series (52 episodes)
2010	He's the One... Or Not	Karine LeGuennec	Vincent Giovanni	TV movie
2010	Our Lady of the Loonies	Lieutenant Sanchez	Arnaud Sélignac	TV movie
2011	Legally Messy	Viviane Fondary	Arnauld Mercadier	TV movie
2011	Gérald K. Gérald	Samantha de Réglisse	Élisabeth Rappeneau	TV movie
2011	Le Grand Restaurant II	The canary's kidnapper	Gérard Pullicino	TV movie
2012	La Baie d'Alger	Zoé	Merzak Allouache	TV movie
2012	À dix minutes des naturistes	Solange Langlois	Stéphane Clavier	TV movie
2012	Victoire Bonnot	Madame Constantin	Vincent Giovanni & Philippe Dajoux	TV series (3 episodes)
2013	Les Vieux Calibres	Madame Le Bihan	Marcel Bluwal & Serge De Closets	TV movie
2013	Je vous présente ma femme	Viviane Martin	Élisabeth Rappeneau	TV movie
2013	Vive la colo !	Rosalie	Stéphane Clavier	TV series (4 episodes)
2013	La Famille Katz	Lisette	Arnauld Mercadier	TV series (6 episodes)
2014	Tout est permis	Sandra	Émilie Deleuze	TV movie
2014	Scènes de ménage	Caroline	Francis Duquet	TV series (2 episodes)
2015	Lettre à France	Gloria	Stéphane Clavier	TV movie
2015	Merci pour tout, Charles	Valérie	Ernesto Oña	TV movie
2015	Nos chers voisins	Sylvie	Gaëtan Bevernaege	TV series (3 episodes)
2016	Hidden Kisses	Catherine	Didier Bivel	TV movie
2016	Murders in Avignon	Laurence Ravel	Stéphane Kappes	TV movie
2016	3 Mariages et 1 coup de foudre	Annie	Gilles de Maistre	TV movie
2018	Les impatientes	Chantal, The Baroness	Jean-Marc Brondolo	TV mini-series
2018	Nina	Sylvie Vivot	Jérôme Portheault	TV series (1 episode)
2019	La malédiction du volcan	Juliette Gentil	Marwen Abdallah	TV Movie
2020	Hortense	Sophie Delalande	Thierry Binisti	TV movie
2020	Cassandre	Nicole Gagneux	Marwen Abdallah	TV series (1 episode)
2020	Mongeville	Mother Catherine	Edwin Baily	TV series (1 episode)
2020	Les Copains d'abord	Annie	Denis Imbert	TV series (6 episodes)
2021	100% bio	Hortensia	Fabien Onteniente	TV movie
2021–22	Tomorrow Is Ours	Brigitte Daunier	Julien Israël, Jérémie Patier, ...	TV series (59 episodes)
2023	L'Art du crime	Michele Dompierre	Floriane Crépin	TV series (1 episode)
2024	The New Look	The Baroness	Julia Ducournau	TV series (2 episodes)

== Box-office ==
Movies starring Catherine Jacob with more than a million tickets sold in France.

	Films	Director	Year	France (tickets)
1	Happiness Is in the Field	Étienne Chatiliez	1995	4,931,618
2	Life Is a Long Quiet River	Étienne Chatiliez	1988	4,088,009
3	Tatie Danielle	Étienne Chatiliez	1990	2,151,463
4	La Soif de l'or	Gérard Oury	1993	1,517,890
5	My Father the Hero	Gérard Lauzier	1991	1,428,871
6	Merci la vie	Bertrand Blier	1991	1,088,777

== TV Show ==
Year	Title	TV Channel
1994	La Grammaire impertinente	France 5
2016	Conseil d'indiscipline	Paris Première

== Author ==
Year	Book	Publishing	Notes
2019	Hommes/Femmes, ce qu'elles en disent...	Pygmalion	Written with Franck Leclerc

== Participations ==
- 1998 : Festival international du film de comédie de l'Alpe d'Huez (Jury)
- 2003 : 2003 Festival international du film fantastique de Gérardmer (Jury)
- 2005 : Festival du film d'aventures de Valenciennes (Jury)
- 2006 : Cabourg Film Festival (Jury)
- 2008 : 2008 Festival international du film fantastique de Gérardmer (President of the Jury - Short Competition)
- 2010 : Festival de Beaune (Jury)
- 2011 : Festival international du film de Saint-Jean-de-Luz (President of the Jury)
- 2011 : Festival du Film français de Cosne-Cours-sur-Loire (President of the Jury)
- 2012 : President of the 17th Lumière Awards
- 2012 : Dinard Comedy Festival (President of the Jury)
- 2016 : Godmother of the Dinard Comedy Festival
- 2017 : Festival international du film de comédie de Liège (Jury)
- 2018 : Festival du cinéma et musique de film de La Baule (President of the Jury)
- 2019 : Waterloo Historical Film Festival (Jury)
- 2019 : Des Notes et des Toiles (President of the Jury)

== Awards and nominations ==
Year	Award	Nominated work	Result
1989	César Award for Most Promising Actress	Life Is a Long Quiet River	Won
1991	César Award for Best Supporting Actress	Tatie Danielle	Nominated
1992	César Award for Best Supporting Actress	Merci la vie	Nominated
1995	César Award for Best Supporting Actress	Neuf mois	Nominated
1997	Golden Goblet Award for Best Actress	Sur un air de mambo	Won
1998	Reims International Television Days	Maintenant ou jamais	Won
