= My Father the Hero =

My Father the Hero may refer to:

- My Father the Hero (1991 film) (Mon père, ce héros), a French film directed by Gérard Lauzier
- My Father the Hero (1994 film), an English-language remake directed by Steve Miner
