= Hazanavicius =

Hazanavicius is a surname. Notable people with the surname include:

- Michel Hazanavicius (born 1967), French director, producer, screenwriter, and film editor
- Serge Hazanavicius (born 1963), French actor and director
