= To Each, Her Own =

2018 film directed by Myriam Aziza

- Film poster
- French: Les goûts et les couleurs
- Directed by: Myriam Aziza
- Written by: Myriam Aziza; Denyse Rodriguez-Tomé
- Production company: Netflix
- Distributed by: Netflix
- Release date: 24 June 2018
- Running time: 95 minutes
- Country: France
- Language: French

To Each, Her Own (French: Les goûts et les couleurs, lit. 'Tastes and colors') is a 2018 romantic comedy film directed by Myriam Aziza. The film released on 24 June 2018 on Netflix. The film explores family, religion, race, gender, sexual orientation, nationality and other prejudices through comedy.

== Cast ==
- Sarah Stern as Simone Benloulou - Sister
- Jean-Christophe Folly as Wali
- Julia Piaton as Claire - Simone's girlfriend
- Catherine Jacob as Noelle Benloulou - Mother
- Richard Berry as Norbert Benloulou - Father
- Arié Elmaleh as David Benloulou - Brother
- Clémentine Poidatz as Geraldine da Coste - Co-worker
- Stéphane Debac as Eric Taieb - Geraldine's boyfriend
- Sophie Mounicot as Sylvie Lopez
- David Houri as Matt Benloulou - Brother
- Lionel Lingelser as Nathaniel - Matt's boyfriend

== Reception ==
Movie Babble said the film "had promise in the first few scenes. It was funny, it was charming, and seemed as though it would address many important issues. Then it lost its way, as abruptly as the protagonist did. These topics deserve much better representation than they receive here." Film Rezensionen saidit "lacks the charm that distinguished the gay teen romance "Alex Strangelove," released shortly before on the same streaming platform. However, the story of an emotionally confused lesbian remains surprisingly ambivalent until the very end – which is quite an achievement in this genre."
