= Les Braqueuses =

- Directed by: Jean-Paul Salomé
- Written by: Laurent Bénégui; Joëlle Goron; Gérard Mordillat; Jean-Paul Salomé
- Produced by: Monique Annaud; Gilles Sacuto
- Starring: Catherine Jacob; Clémentine Célarié; Alexandra Kazan; Nanou Garcia; Annie Girardot
- Cinematography: Patrick Duroux
- Edited by: Michèle Robert-Lauliac
- Music by: Bill Baxter; Olivier Lanneluc; Claude Sitruk
- Distributed by: Chrysalide Film
- Release date: 29 June 1994
- Running time: 90 minutes
- Country: France
- Language: French
- Box office: $1.3 million

Les Braqueuses is a 1994 French comedy crime film, directed by Jean-Paul Salomé.

== Plot ==
Four young women from Montélimar, France resort to robbing a sex shop to help make ends meet. Unfortunately, the 1500 franc (€230) loot isn't enough to cover their bills. Hoping for a bigger payoff, they carefully plan a bank robbery. Will Cécile, Muriel, Bijou and Lola thwart the police and succeed in making off with the money?

== Cast ==
- Catherine Jacob as Cécile Lambardant
- Clémentine Célarié as Bijou
- Alexandra Kazan as Muriel
- Nanou Garcia as Lola
- Annie Girardot as Cécile's mother
- Jean-Claude Adelin as Xavier
- Jacques Gamblin as Thierry
- Laurent Spielvogel as Monsieur Leroux
- Abbes Zahmani as Monsieur Ted
- Harry Cleven as Max
- Roland Amstutz as Bernachon
