= Serge Hazanavicius =

French actor and director (born 1963)

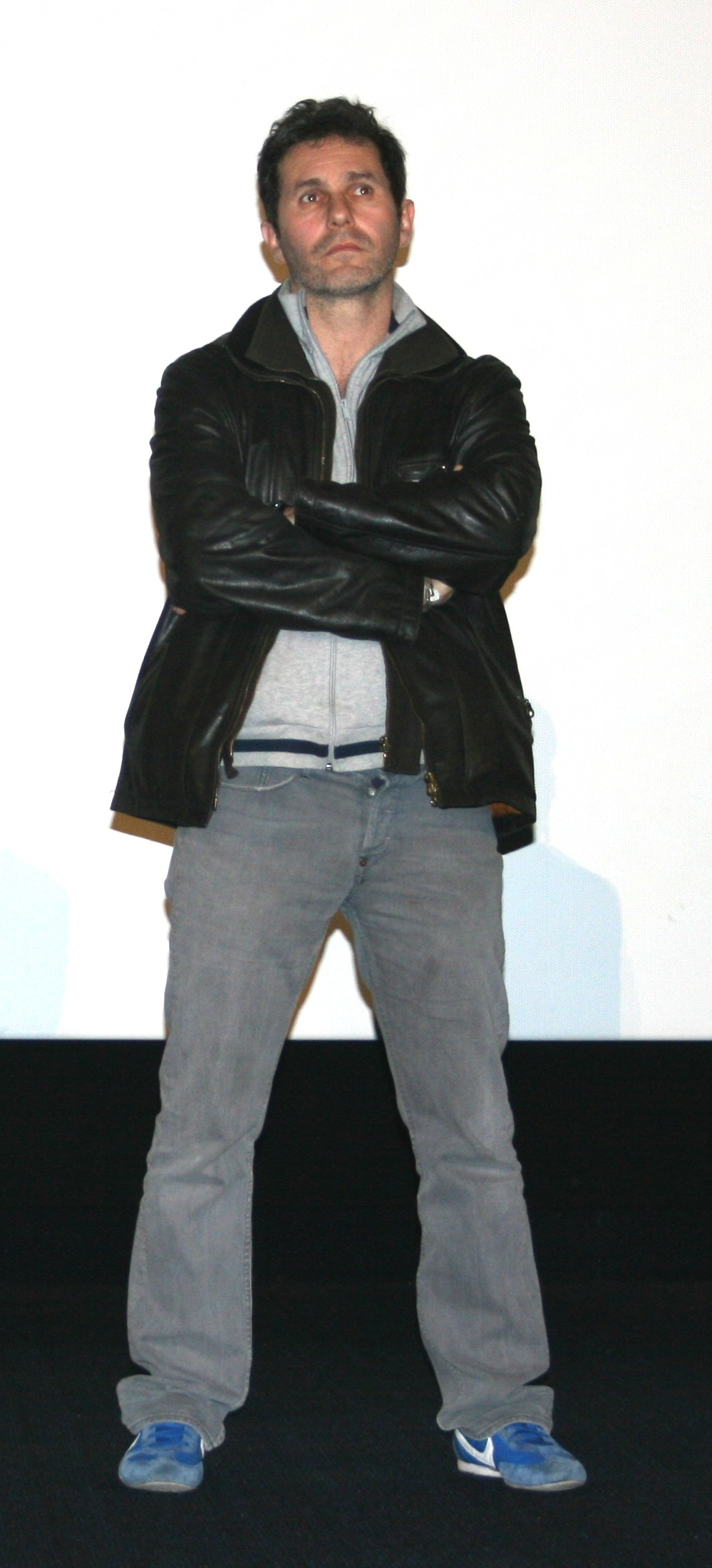
- Serge Hazanavicius in 2008
- Born: 11 September 1963 (age 63); Paris, France
- Occupations: Actor, director, writer
- Years active: 1988–present

Serge Hazanavicius (French: [a.za.na.vi.sjys] Lithuanian: Hazanavičius) (born 11 September 1963) is an actor and director, working primarily in France.

== Personal life and family ==
Hazanavicius was born in Paris. His brother is Michel Hazanavicius. They are primarily of Jewish ancestry. Their grandparents were originally from Lithuania and Poland and settled in France in the 1920s.

== Theater ==
Year	Title	Author	Director	Notes
1988	Three Sisters	Anton Chekhov	Maurice Bénichou	
1990	1, place Garibaldi	Jean-Claude Penchenat	Jean-Claude Penchenat	
2000	Resonance	Katherine Burger	Irina Brook	Nominated - Molière Award for Best Male Newcomer
2002	Conversations with My Father	Herb Gardner	Marcel Bluwal	
2003	84, Charing Cross Road	Helene Hanff	Serge Hazanavicius	
2004	La Folie du Spectacle	Axelle Laffont	Maurice Barthélemy & Serge Hazanavicius (2)	
2006	Conversations après un enterrement	Yasmina Reza	Gabriel Garran	
2008	Geronimo	David Decca	Caroline Duffau & Serge Hazanavicius (3)	
2010-12	The Young Man Show	Kev Adams, Mickael Quiroga & John Eledjam	Serge Hazanavicius (4)	
2013-15	Voilà Voilà	Kev Adams	Serge Hazanavicius (5)	

== Filmography ==
=== Actor ===
Year	Title	Role	Director	Notes
1992	Jusqu'à demain		Emilie Deleuze	Short
1993	Les gens normaux n'ont rien d'exceptionnel	François	Laurence Ferreira Barbosa	
1993	Drôles d'oiseaux	The cop	Peter Kassovitz	
1993	L'orange amère	Adrien	Olivier Sadock	Short
1993	La Classe américaine	Dubbed Voice	Michel Hazanavicius & Dominique Mézerette	TV movie
1993	Ce soir avec les nouveaux	Several	Pascal Duchène	TV series (1 episode)
1994	Tous les garçons et les filles de leur âge...	The boy	Emilie Deleuze (2)	TV series (1 episode)
1995	Happiness Is in the Field	Alexis Legoff	Étienne Chatiliez	
1995	Le futur		Dominique Farrugia	Short
1996	Delphine 1, Yvan 0	Yvan Krief	Dominique Farrugia (2)	
1997	Didier	Jean-Philipe	Alain Chabat	
1997	Le déménagement	Franck	Olivier Doran	
1998	Le clone	The neighbor	Fabio Conversi	
1998	Le danger d'aimer	Antoine	Serge Meynard	TV movie
1998	Les marmottes	Antoine	Jean-Denis Robert & Daniel Vigne	TV mini-series
1999	Mes amis	Fred	Michel Hazanavicius (2)	
1999	Voyous voyelles	Bernard	Serge Meynard (2)	
1999	Djedi		Lionel Escama	Short
1999	Retour à Fonteyne	Vincent	Philomène Esposito	TV movie
2000	En attendant	Franck	Serge Hazanavicius	Short
2000	Anna en Corse	Ange	Carole Giacobbi	TV movie
2001	J'ai faim !!!	Jean-René	Florence Quentin	
2001	15 August	Loïc	Patrick Alessandrin	
2001	Les gens en maillot de bain ne sont pas (forcément) superficiels	Philippe	Éric Assous	
2001	Barnie et ses petites contrariétés	Alexandre	Bruno Chiche	
2001	Voyance et manigance	Michel	Eric Fourniols	
2001	Le soleil au-dessus des nuages	Antoine	Eric Le Roch	
2001	Bella ciao	Achille	Stéphane Giusti	
2001	Divine comédie	Adrien	François Villard	Short
2001	Maïmiti, l'enfant des îles		Serge Meynard (3)	TV movie
2003	La voix de mon fils		Alexandre Brasseur	Short
2004	Frédérique amoureuse	The lover	Pierre Lacan	Short
2005	40 mg d'amour par jour	Pierre	Charles Meurisse	Short
2005	Le manie-Tout	The father	Georges Le Piouffle	Short
2005	Un coin d'Azur	Norbert Legransard	Heikki Arekallio	TV movie
2005	Le crime des renards	Math's teacher	Serge Meynard (4)	TV movie
2005	Les hommes de coeur	Marc Doucet	Édouard Molinaro	TV series (1 episode)
2006	Célibataires	Nathan	Jean-Michel Verner	
2006	Bandidos	John	Bruno Hadjadj	
2006	Sable noir	Bertrand	Eric Valette	TV series (1 episode)
2007	New délire	The groom	Eric Le Roch (2)	
2007	Mariage surprise	Franck	Arnaud Sélignac	TV movie
2008	I've Loved You So Long	Luc	Philippe Claudel	
2008	La vie à une	Martin Verdon	Frédéric Auburtin	TV movie
2008	Miroir, mon beau miroir	The comedian	Serge Meynard (5)	TV movie
2009	OSS 117: Lost in Rio	Staman	Michel Hazanavicius (3)	
2009	Divorces !	Ben	Valérie Guignabodet	
2009	Envoyés très spéciaux	Jacques Maillard	Frédéric Auburtin (2)	
2009	Une affaire d'état	Olivier Keller	Eric Valette (2)	
2009	Une place à prendre	Benjamin	Charles Meurisse (2)	Short
2009	La double inconstance	Trivelin	Carole Giacobbi (2)	TV movie
2009	Mes amis, mes amours, mes emmerdes	François	Sylvie Ayme	TV series (6 episodes)
2010	Amélie au pays des Bodin's	Doctor Whatelse	Eric Le Roch (3)	
2010	J'étais à Nüremberg	Pierre Bernard	André Chandelle	TV movie
2010	L'ombre du Mont-Saint-Michel	Yann Dole	Klaus Biedermann	TV movie
2010	Agatha Christie's Poirot	Xavier Bouc	Philip Martin	TV series (1 episode)
2011	The Prey	Lafay	Eric Valette (3)	
2011	Un baiser papillon	Raphaël	Karine Silla	
2012	Maman	Serge	Alexandra Leclère	
2012	Les hommes à lunettes		Eric Le Roch (4)	
2012	La solitude du pouvoir	Martin Pelletier	Josée Dayan	TV movie
2012	Assassinée	Richard Chartiez	Thierry Binisti	TV movie
2012	Nom de code : Rose	Fabrice Chapelier	Arnauld Mercadier	TV movie
2013	Le clan des Lanzac	Fabrice Moulin	Josée Dayan (2)	TV movie
2013	The Borgias	Louis XII	Kari Skogland & David Leland	TV series (2 episodes)
2013	New Tricks	Max Clement	Andy Hay	TV series (2 episodes)
2013	La Famille Katz	Leny	Arnauld Mercadier (2)	TV series (6 episodes)
2014	The Monuments Men	Rene Armand	George Clooney	
2014	United Passions	Robert Guérin	Frédéric Auburtin (3)	
2014	Scènes de ménages	Norbert	Francis Duquet	TV series (1 episode)
2015	Foyle's War	Luc Tellier	Andy Hay (2)	TV series (1 episode)
2016	Tokyo Trial		Rob W. King	TV mini-series

=== Filmmaker ===
Year	Title	Role	Notes
2000	En attendant	Director & writer	Short
2007	Mariage surprise	Writer	TV movie
2008-09	Palizzi	Director	TV series (14 episodes)
2012	La classe américaine	Director, writer & Cinematographer	Documentary
2017	Tout là-haut	Director & writer	
