= Les Grands Ducs =

- Directed by: Patrice Leconte
- Written by: Patrice Leconte; Serge Frydman
- Produced by: Thierry de Ganay; Monique Guerrier
- Starring: Jean-Pierre Marielle; Philippe Noiret; Jean Rochefort; Catherine Jacob; Michel Blanc
- Cinematography: Eduardo Serra
- Edited by: Joëlle Hache
- Music by: Angélique Nachon; Jean-Claude Nachon
- Distributed by: BAC Films
- Release date: 21 February 1996
- Running time: 85 minutes
- Country: France
- Language: French
- Budget: $7.4 million
- Box office: $3.8 million

Les Grands Ducs (English: The Big Dukes) is a 1996 comedy film directed by Patrice Leconte, starring Jean-Pierre Marielle, Philippe Noiret, Jean Rochefort and Catherine Jacob.

== Plot ==
Georges Cox, Victor Vialat, and Eddie Carpentier are old, unemployed, pathetic, and broke actors. They manage to get hired in a mediocre show (a boulevard comedy called Scooby-Doo, going on tour) run by a swindling impresario, Shapiron. This ruined producer will do everything to sabotage the show and thus collect the insurance, but the three actors unexpectedly take on the three small roles with panache, so as not to miss the last chance of their lives.

== Cast ==
- Jean-Pierre Marielle as George Cox
- Philippe Noiret as Victor Vialat
- Jean Rochefort as Eddie Carpentier
- Catherine Jacob as Carla Milo
- Michel Blanc as Shapiron
- Clotilde Courau as Juliette
- Jacques Mathou as Janvier
- Pierre-Arnaud Juin as Pat
- Jacques Nolot as Francis Marceau
- Albert Delpy as Harry
- Marie Pillet as Clémence
- Jean-Marie Galey as Markus
- Dominique Besnehard as Atlas's Boss
