= The Ballad of Titus =

- French: La ballade de Titus
- Directed by: Vincent De Brus
- Written by: Vincent De Brus; Stéphane Giusti
- Produced by: Christian Larouche; Jean-Pierre Ramsay-Levi
- Starring: Michel Courtemanche; Jean-Claude Dreyfus; Catherine Jacob
- Cinematography: Michel Abramowicz
- Edited by: Marie-Blanche Colonna
- Music by: Hadi Kalafate
- Production companies: Cinépix; FIT Productions
- Distributed by: Les Films de l'Atalante
- Release date: 17 July 1997
- Running time: 90 min
- Countries: France; Canada
- Language: French

The Ballad of Titus (French: La ballade de Titus) is a 1997 French-Canadian co-produced comedy film, directed by Vincent De Brus.

== Plot ==
Burlesque fable addressing a serious subject : the right to difference through the adventures of Titus from a young age was locked in the basement by his adoptive parents with only companions a television, a VCR and five hundred cartoons cassettes. We find him twenty years later in the clinic of the terrible Dr. Schrink. But there, thwarting the plans of the wicked, he meets the love and glory soon.

== Cast ==
- Michel Courtemanche as Titus
- Jean-Claude Dreyfus as Doctor Shrink
- Catherine Jacob as Louise
- Natacha Lindinger as Jeanne
- Antoine Duléry as Monsieur Marsan
- Myriam Moszko as Madame Marsan
- Sylvie Lachat as Josiane Médiocre
- Patrick Paroux as Delile
- Christian Pereira as Rouget
- Marie-Christine Adam as The Minister
- Suzanne Drouet as The Secretary
- Macha Model as The Journalist

== Production ==
The movie was first released in Germany, 17 July 1997, and then in France, 15 July 1998.
