= Thelma, Louise et Chantal =

- Film poster
- Directed by: Benoît Pétré
- Written by: Benoît Pétré
- Produced by: Vérane Frédiani; Franck Ribière; Vincent Brançon; Priscilla Bertin
- Starring: Catherine Jacob; Jane Birkin; Caroline Cellier
- Cinematography: Stephan Massis
- Edited by: Reynald Bertrand
- Music by: Keren Ann
- Distributed by: La Fabrique de Films; Studio 37
- Release dates: January 20, 2010 (l'Alpe d'Huez); March 3, 2010 (France)
- Running time: 90 minutes
- Country: France
- Language: French
- Budget: $4 million
- Box office: $2.7 million

Thelma, Louise et Chantal is a 2010 French comedy film directed by Benoît Pétré. The film premiered at the 2010 L'Alpe d'Huez Film Festival.

== Plot ==
Gabrielle, Nelly and Chantal are three girlfriends. They decide to travel together to the wedding of their ex at La Rochelle. During this trip, they share their satisfactions and frustrations.

== Cast ==
- Jane Birkin as Nelly
- Caroline Cellier as Gabrielle
- Catherine Jacob as Chantal
- Thierry Lhermitte as Phillipe
- Michèle Bernier as The bride
- Alysson Paradis as Elisa
- Sébastien Huberdeau as Mathieu
- Micheline Presle as Huguette
- Joséphine de Meaux as Sophie
- Arié Elmaleh as Nicolas
- Benoît Pétré as Hugo
- Stéphane Metzger as Bruno
- Nicolas Schweri as Clément
- Jean-Pierre Martins as the mechanic
- Eriq Ebouaney as the realtor
- Brice Fournier as Patrick
- Adeline Giroudon as Nadège
- Julie Meunier as Chloé
