= God Is Great and I'm Not =

2001 film by Pascale Bailly

- Dieu est grand je suis toute petite
- Directed by: Pascale Bailly
- Written by: Pascale Bailly; Alain Tasma
- Produced by: Alain Sarde; Georges Benayoun
- Starring: Audrey Tautou; Edouard Baer
- Cinematography: Antoine Roch
- Edited by: Lise Beaulieu; Jean-Pierre Viguie
- Music by: Stéphane Malca; Fabrice Naud
- Distributed by: Mars Distribution
- Release date: 2001
- Running time: 100 minutes
- Country: France
- Language: French / Hebrew
- Budget: $3 million
- Box office: $1.9 million

God Is Great and I'm Not (French: Dieu est grand, je suis toute petite; God Is Great, I'm Not) is a 2001 French romantic comedy film directed by Pascale Bailly starring Audrey Tautou and Edouard Baer. It was released in 2001, following Tautou's international success in Le Fabuleux Destin d'Amélie Poulain.

== Cast ==
- Audrey Tautou as Michèle
- Edouard Baer as François
- Julie Depardieu as Valérie
- Catherine Jacob as Evelyne
- Philippe Laudenbach as Jean
- Cathy Verney as Florence
- Anna Koch as Régine
- Thierry Neuvic as The first patient

== Plot ==
Michèle's writes her first journal entry, "I am 20 years old, and I have ruined my life!" This is just one of the many journal entry titles that are flashed before every particular scene in the film. Michèle had just recently broken up with her boyfriend so she meets up with some of her friends at a café. It is there that she meets the charming veterinarian François. Though Michèle has a promising modeling career, she feels that something, or someone, is missing in her life. François quickly fills this void, and Michèle feels partially whole. She first claims that she is Catholic but is dissatisfied with the results of praying and worshipping. By recommendation, she begins to follow Buddhism through meditation and use of elaborate costume jewelry. Eventually, she discovers that François is Jewish; however, he does not practice his faith. Throughout the film, she immerses herself in Judaism, following traditions such as the Sabbath. François breaks up with her by telling her "your touch sickens me", after accusing her of lying. He then engages in several other affairs but fails to ever marry. She attempts to date a few men but does not create any true connections. Finally, at a wedding of their friend Valérie, Francois has broken up with yet another woman and claims to desire her. The movie ends with the famous line, "...to be continued" leaving viewers curious about their future.

== Reception ==
On Rotten Tomatoes the film has an approval rating of 25% based on reviews from 24 critics. On Metacritic the film has a score of 37% based on reviews from 11 critics, indicating "generally unfavorable reviews".
