= Jean-Paul Roussillon =

French actor (1931–2009)

- Born: 5 March 1931; Paris, France
- Died: 31 July 2009 (aged 78); Bourgogne, France
- Occupation: Actor
- Years active: 1954-2008

Jean-Paul Roussillon (5 March 1931 – 31 July 2009) was a French actor. He appeared in more than 80 films and television shows between 1954 and 2008. He starred in the film Playing 'In the Company of Men', which was screened in the Un Certain Regard section at the 2003 Cannes Film Festival. He won the César Award for Best Supporting Actor for his role in A Christmas Tale. For years Roussillon had been battling lung cancer and died on 31 July 2009 in Auxerre, France.

== Partial filmography ==
- La chair et le diable (1954) – Apo Ancelin
- Deadlier Than the Male (1956) – Amédée
- L'amour descend du ciel (1957) – Jean
- The Fox of Paris (1957) – Francois, Yvonne's Brother
- Le mariage de Figaro (1959) – Grippe-Soleil
- La 1000eme fenêtre (1960) – Boutain
- Weekend at Dunkirk (1964) – La gouape / Blackguard
- Une affaire d'hommes (1981) – Le juge Dauzat
- The Trout (1982) – Verjon
- La guerre des demoiselles (1984) – Le juge
- Outlaws (1985) – Le fermier belliqueux
- Monsieur de Pourceaugnac (1985) – Oronte
- He Died with His Eyes Open (1985) – Léonce
- Elsa, Elsa (1985) – Albert, le producteur
- My Brother-in-Law Killed My Sister (1986) – Somptueux Larbin
- États d'âme (1986) – Arnolli, le syndicaliste
- Twist again à Moscou (1986)
- Les clowns de Dieu (1986) – Garniks
- Hôtel de France (1987) – Jean Trillat
- Maladie d'amour (1987) – Jacques
- Alouette, je te plumerai (1988) – Vergne's friend
- Comédie d'amour (1989) – Henri
- Je t'ai dans la peau (1990) – Bébert, gardien de la Bourse du travail
- Plein fer (1990) – Napoléon
- La fille du magicien (1990) – Nadir
- Le Brasier (1991) – Dalmas
- The Secret of Sarah Tombelaine (1991) – Emile
- Cherokee (1991) – Oncle Fernand
- List of Merite (1992) – Albert Croquebois
- La Fille de l'air (1992) – Raymond
- Revenge of the Musketeers (1994) – Planchet
- Les truffes (1995) – Le vigneron
- Oui (1995) – Monsieur Arthur
- Drancy Avenir (1997) – La voix de l'explorateur (voice)
- On connaît la chanson (1997) – Father
- Le plus beau pays du monde (1999) – Le directeur du théâtre
- Une hirondelle a fait le printemps (2001) – Jean
- Mischka (2002) – Mischka
- L'idole (2002) – Roger Castellac
- Playing 'In the Company of Men' (2003) – Henri Jurrieu
- Black Mor's Island (2004) – Mac Gregor (voice)
- Kings and Queen (2004) – Abel Vuillard
- Zone libre (2007) – Maury
- A Christmas Tale (2008) – Abel – Junon's husband
