= Sur un air de mambo =

- Written by: Jean-Louis Bertuccelli; Sabine Ullmann
- Directed by: Jean-Louis Bertucelli
- Starring: Catherine Jacob
- Theme music composer: Alain Le Douarin
- Country of origin: France
- Original language: French

Production
- Producers: Laurence Bachman; Philippe Allaire; António da Cunha Telles
- Cinematography: José António Loureiro
- Running time: 89 minutes
- Production companies: Alya Productions; France 2

Original release
- Network: France 2
- Release: 8 May 1996

Sur un air de mambo is a 1996 television film directed by Jean-Louis Bertuccelli and written by him and Sabine Ullmann. It stars Catherine Jacob and it was broadcast on France 2 in 1996.

== Main cast ==
- Catherine Jacob as Arlette
- Bernard Alane as Jérôme
- Jean-Paul Muel as Louis
- Betty Bomonde as Marguerite
- Jean-Jacques Moreau as Gilles
- Anna Gaylor as Yvonne
- Rosa Lobato Faria as Madame Rosa
- Reine Bartève as Madame Castang
- Sylvie Flepp as Madame Mercier
- Manuela Cassola as Madame Manuela
- Peter Michael as Pedro
- Suzana Borges as Brigitte
- Alexandre de Sousa as Dr. Bernachon
- José Pedro Gomes as The contractor

== Awards and nominations ==
Catherine Jacob won the Golden Goblet Award for Best Actress to the 1996 Shanghai International Film Festival. She's the first and only French actress to win this prize.
