= Le coeur à l'ouvrage =

- Directed by: Laurent Dussaux
- Written by: Tonino Benacquista
- Produced by: Christine Gozlan; Jean-Marie Duprez; Alain Sarde
- Starring: Mathilde Seigner; Bruno Slagmulder; Amira Casar; Catherine Jacob; Micheline Presle
- Cinematography: Paco Wiser
- Edited by: Thierry Derocles
- Music by: François Staal
- Production companies: Ciné Valse; Les Films du Pré
- Distributed by: BAC Films
- Release date: 12 July 2000
- Running time: 97 min
- Country: France
- Language: French
- Budget: $3.3 million
- Box office: $85.000

Le coeur à l'ouvrage is a 2000 French comedy drama film, directed by Laurent Dussaux.

== Cast ==
- Mathilde Seigner as Chloë
- Bruno Slagmulder as Julien
- Amira Casar as Noëlle
- Catherine Jacob as Françoise
- Micheline Presle as Madeleine
- Marc Citti as Bruno
- Patrick Catalifo as Marc
- François Perrot as Ronald
- Christine Citti as Mrs. Combescot
- Cansel Elçin as Hamlet
- Antoine Duléry as The Drama teacher
- Audrey Langle as Ophelia
- Nadia Fossier as Lorraine
- Margot Abascal as Sophie
- Sophie Gourdin as Marianne
- Emmanuel Vieilly as Pierrot
- Thierry Kazazian as Thierry
- Maher Kamoun as Eric
- André Chazel as Roger
- Martine Erhel as Liliane
- Tonino Benacquista as Tattooer
