= Streamfield, les carnets noirs =

- Film poster
- Directed by: Jean-Luc Miesch
- Written by: Jean-Luc Miesch; Patrick Rougelet; Jean de Tonquedec
- Produced by: Jules Miesch; Stéphane Bourgine
- Starring: Bernard Le Coq; Jean-Pierre Castaldi; Catherine Jacob
- Cinematography: Philippe Brelot
- Music by: Philippe Sarde
- Production company: JJLM Films
- Release date: January 6, 2010
- Running time: 105 minutes
- Country: France
- Language: French

Streamfield, les carnets noirs is a 2010 French film directed by Jean-Luc Miesch. The film is based on the Clearstream affair.

== Cast ==
- Bernard Le Coq as Dominique Menacci
- Jean-Pierre Castaldi as president Massedelle
- Catherine Jacob as Judge Soren
- Élisabeth Bourgine as Liso Vega
- Marie-Sophie L. as Patricia Morlais
- Philippe Morier-Genoud as Gaspard Arthus
- Pierre Malet as Iskander Labade
- François-Éric Gendron as François Viallat
- François Marthouret as Abel Mocchi
- Pierre Arditi as the first
- Philippe du Janerand as Gilbert Kariou
- Jean-Claude Dauphin as Corbin
- Pascale Louange as Pascale
- Patrick Lambert as Charles
