= J'ai faim!!! =

2001 film by Florence Quentin

- Theatrical release poster
- Directed by: Florence Quentin
- Written by: Florence Quentin
- Produced by: Patrice Ledoux; Nicolas Seydoux
- Starring: Catherine Jacob; Michèle Laroque
- Cinematography: Bruno de Keyzer
- Edited by: Anne Lafarge
- Production companies: Gaumont; TF1 Films Production; Canal +
- Distributed by: Gaumont Buena Vista International
- Release date: 2001
- Running time: 97 minutes
- Country: France
- Language: French
- Budget: $8.4 million
- Box office: $3 million

J'ai faim!!! (I'm hungry!!!) is a 2001 French comedy film directed by Florence Quentin.

== Plot ==
The day she receives an inheritance from her uncle, who is seriously ill in the hospital, Lily hurts her back having sex with her partner. The following day, she learns that he is leaving her for his assistant, a beautiful young woman. Lily, aided by her friends and her caretaker, does everything she can to get back her Toto.

== Cast ==
- Catherine Jacob as Lily
- Michèle Laroque as Arlette
- Garance Clavel as Yolande
- Isabelle Candelier as Corinne
- Alessandra Martines as Anaïs Pommard
- Yvan Le Bolloc'h as Barnabé
- Samuel Labarthe as The physiotherapist
- Stéphane Audran as Gaby
- Julien Guiomar as Guyomard
- Serge Hazanavicius as Jean-René
- Valérie Decobert-Koretzky as Sonia
- Sophie Tellier as Claire
- Edith Perret as Madame Savart
- Thierry Métaireau as Jérôme
- Philippe Cotten as Alain
- Jean-Louis Richard as Doctor Montalembert
- Jean Dell as Barnabé's client
