= Maman (2012 film) =

- Film poster
- Directed by: Alexandra Leclère
- Written by: Alexandra Leclère
- Produced by: Cyril Colbeau-Justin; Jean-Baptiste Dupont; Sylvie Pialat; Jeremy Burdek; Nadia Khamlichi; Adrian Politowski; Gilles Waterkeyn
- Starring: Josiane Balasko; Mathilde Seigner; Marina Foïs
- Cinematography: Laurent Brunet
- Music by: Grégoire Hetzel
- Production companies: Les Films du Worso; France 2 Cinéma
- Distributed by: Wild Bunch
- Release date: 9 May 2012
- Running time: 88 minutes
- Country: France
- Language: French
- Budget: $7.9 million
- Box office: $3.7 million

Maman is a 2012 French drama directed by Alexandra Leclère.

== Plot ==
Alice and Sandrine are sisters. One is married to Serge, who is a realtor, and offers piano lessons to occupy his time. The second has two sons, Thomas and Nicolas. She works in an advertising agency and occasionally sleeps with the director, Erwan. These two women suddenly have their routines disrupted when their mother suddenly reappears in their lives. She arrives from Lyon, with the intention of moving to Paris after a stormy divorce. This same mother abandoned the two sisters two decades before, leaving them unfulfilled and suffering a deep neglect. The sudden reunion becomes tumultuous, and the two sisters hatch a plan to kidnap and sequester their mother in Brittany, hoping to make up for lost time and recover the love they never received.

== Cast ==
- Josiane Balasko as Paulette
- Mathilde Seigner as Sandrine
- Marina Foïs as Alice
- Michel Vuillermoz as Erwan de Kerdoec
- Serge Hazanavicius as Serge
- Thomas Gérard as Thomas
- Mathieu Rousseau as Nicolas
- Kojiro Okada as pianist
