= Philippe Khorsand =

French actor

- Born: Philippe Teymour Khorsand; 17 February 1948; Paris, France
- Died: 29 January 2008 (aged 59); Paris, France
- Occupation: Actor

Philippe Khorsand (February 17, 1948 – January 29, 2008) was a French actor. His father was Iranian and his mother was French. He first appeared in a number of small roles in the 1970s. One of his most memorable roles as husband and father in Tableau d'honneur (1992).

Khorsand died of a hemorrhage at the age of 59 in Paris.

== Partial filmography ==
- Laisse aller... c'est une valse (1971) - Homme de Varèse
- Hippopotamours (1976) - Un danseur guinguette (uncredited)
- Lâche-moi les valseuses!... (1977) - Philippe
- Le mors aux dents (1979) - Flipper
- Rien ne va plus (1979) - Le conducteur au péage / Jacky / M. Alexandre
- Inspector Blunder (1980) - Le satyre Alphonse Rouchard
- T'empêches tout le monde de dormir (1982) - Michel
- Édith et Marcel (1983) - Jo Longman
- Zig Zag Story (1983) - Police inspector
- Attention une femme peut en cacher une autre! (1983) - Raphaël
- Les Compères (1983) - Milan
- P'tit Con (1984) - Eric
- La vengeance du serpent à plumes (1984) - Ratoff
- La galette du roi (1986) - Clermont
- Si t'as besoin de rien, fais-moi signe (1986) - Grabowsky
- Sauve-toi, Lola (1986) - Rafael Zappa, alias Maurice
- The Joint Brothers (1986) - Un flic
- Les oreilles entre les dents (1986) - Korg
- Keep Your Right Up (1987) - Le passager
- Septième ciel (1987) - Croque-Monsieur
- Les années sandwiches (1988) - Sammy
- Corps z'a corps (1988) - Jean Chabert
- My Best Pals (1989) - Antoine Jobert
- L'aventure extraordinaire d'un papa peu ordinaire (1990) - Sauveur
- La Femme fardée (1990) - Charley
- Le zèbre (1992) - Casenave
- Tableau d'honneur (1992) - Paul Martin - le père de Jules
- Une journée chez ma mère (1993) - Lamatte-Verbé, Le banquier
- La Soif de l'or (1993) - Jacques
- La Vengeance d'une blonde (1994) - Régis Montdor
- Les Misérables (1995) - Le policier / Javert
- Men, Women: A User's Manual (1996) - Restaurant chief
- The Best Job in the World (1996) - Le gardien de l'immeuble
- Messieurs les enfants (1997) - L'huissier
- Don Juan (1998) - Monsieur Dimanche
- Si je t'aime, prends garde à toi (1998) - Gamal
- Total western (2000) - Bergosa
- L'affaire Marcorelle (2000) - Georges
- Victoire (2004) - Jean-Paul
- Le courage d'aimer (2005) - (scenes deleted)
- Le temps des porte-plumes (2006) - Le curé
- Musée haut, musée bas (2008) - Frilon - l'administrateur
- La sonate des spectres (2015) - (final film role)
