= Yvan Le Bolloc'h =

French television and radio host and actor

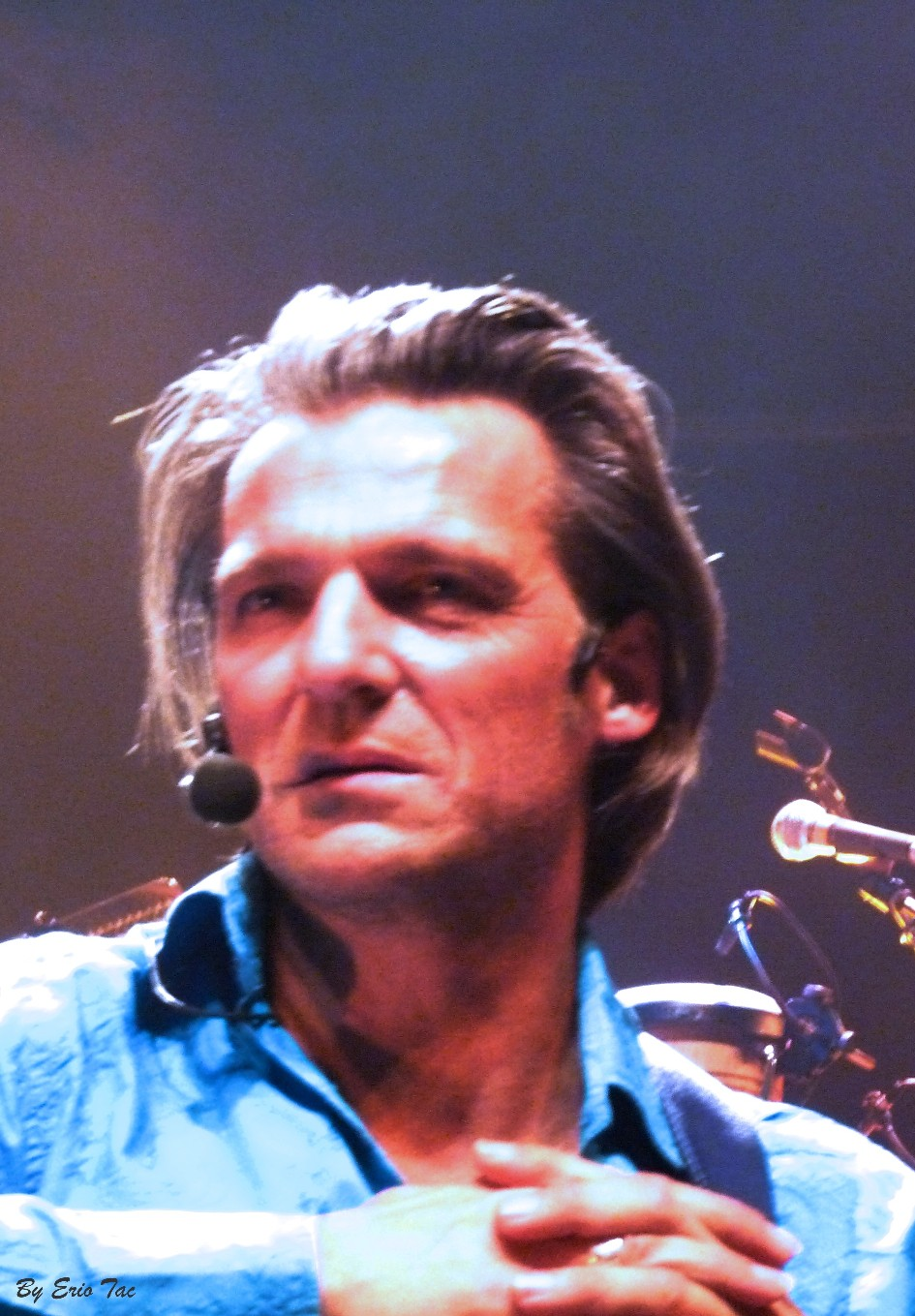
- Born: Yvan Le Bolloc'h; December 20, 1961 (age 64); Brest, Brittany, France
- Occupations: TV host, actor, musician
- Years active: 1990–present
- Spouse: Nouchka Lenders
- Children: 2

Yvan Le Bolloc'h (French pronunciation: [ivɑ̃ lə bɔlɔk]; born 20 December 1961) is a French television and radio host, actor and musician.

== Biography ==
Yvan Le Bolloc'h began as a teacher for four years in Brittany. He worked regularly with Bruno Solo and presented with him several music programs on Canal + in the 1990s (Top 50 and Le plein de super), until the creation of the television series Caméra Café in 2001–2004 on M6 and its movie adaptation under the title Espace détente. He also made a brief appearance on the M6 series Kaamelott by Alexandre Astier.

He participated in the show On va pas s'gêner, hosted by Laurent Ruquier, on Europe 1, then in On a tout essayé, on France 2.

Yvan Le Bolloc'h is also a musician and has played guitar for many years. He is a member of a gypsy music group, inspired by the Gipsy Kings, named Ma guitare s'appelle revient.

== Political commitment ==
On 1 May 2007, he hosted Ségolène Royal`s rally in the Charlety stadium.

In 2017, he supported Jean-Luc Mélenchon and his party La France Insoumise during the 2017 French presidential election.

== Filmography ==
- 1999 : Cuisine chinoise by Frédérique Feder
- 2000 : On fait comme on a dit by Philippe Bérenger
- 2001 : Moulin à paroles by Pascal Rémy
- 2001 : Le Mal du pays by Laurent Bachettrage
- 2001 : J'ai faim !!! by Florence Quentin
- 2003 : Les Clefs de bagnole by Laurent Baffie
- 2004 : Espace détente by Bruno Solo and d'Yvan Le Bolloc'h
- 2007 : Le Bénévole by Jean-Pierre Mocky
- 2009 : Le Séminaire by Charles Nemes
- 2017 : Caméra Café : Origins

== Television ==
- 1990-1991: Télé Zèbre
- 1991-1993 : Le Top 50
- 1993 : Le Plein de super
- 2001-2004 : Caméra Café
- 2005 : Kaamelott

== Theater ==
- 1999 : Un barrage contre le Pacifique by Marguerite Duras, Théâtre International de Langue Française, Théâtre Antoine in 2000
- 2008 : Les Deux Canards by Tristan Bernard
