= 48 Hours a Day =

2008 French comedy film

- Film poster
- French: 48 heures par jour
- Directed by: Catherine Castel
- Written by: Catherine Castel; Serge Adam
- Produced by: Yann Gilbert; Patrice Arrat
- Starring: Aure Atika; Antoine de Caunes; Catherine Jacob; Victoria Abril; Bernadette Lafont; Aurore Clément
- Cinematography: Antoine Roch
- Edited by: Marie Castro
- Music by: Jacques Davidovici
- Production companies: TF1 Films Production; Canal+ (French TV channel)
- Distributed by: Pyramide Distribution
- Release dates: January 2008 (L'Aple d'Huez); 4 June 2008
- Running time: 89 minutes
- Country: France
- Language: French
- Budget: $5.8 million
- Box office: $1 million

48 Hours a Day (French: 48 heures par jour) is a 2008 French comedy film directed by Catherine Castel. The film showed at the 2008 L'Alpe d'Huez Film Festival, and released on 4 June 2008 in France.

== Plot ==
Promised a brilliant professional future but tired to cap his career because she also has to care for her children, Marianne dreams of swapping roles with her husband Bruno so that he comes home earlier to take care of the home. This would in turn help her devote more time to her job! From dream to reality, a humorous eye on the fate of women today who are constantly juggling job, children and home, often alone to bear everything.

== Cast ==
- Aure Atika as Marianne
- Antoine de Caunes as Bruno
- Catherine Jacob as Laura
- Victoria Abril as Anna
- Bernadette Lafont as Mélina
- Aurore Clément as Hélène Lecomte
- Jean-Yves Chatelais as François Lecomte
- Sandrine Dumas as Lucie Guérin
- François-Xavier Demaison as TV host
- Manon Boisseau as Pauline Tellier
- Tristan Aldon as Clément Tellier
- Yves Jacques as Arnaud
- Mathias Mlekuz as Philippe
- Marc Rioufol as Bertrand
- Célia Pilastre as Louise
- Daniel Isoppo as M. Dourra
- Fred Bianconi as Patrick
- Florence d'Azémar as Corinne
- Diane Dassigny as Marie-Ange
- Christine Paolini as Rosa
- Taïra as Mme Takovic
- Husky Kihal as Pierre
- Gwénola de Luze as Béatrice
- Giovanni Battista Saliu as Luigi
