= Maladie d'amour (film) =

Malady of Love
- Directed by: Jacques Deray
- Written by: Danièle Thompson; Andrzej Zulawski
- Produced by: Marie-Laure Reyre
- Starring: Nastassja Kinski; Jean-Hugues Anglade; Michel Piccoli; Jean-Claude Brialy
- Cinematography: Jean-François Robin
- Edited by: Henri Lanoë
- Music by: Romano Musumarra
- Distributed by: AMLF
- Release date: 30 September 1987
- Running time: 122 minutes
- Country: France
- Language: French
- Box office: $6 million

Maladie d'amour is a 1987 French drama romance film, directed by Jacques Deray. The film takes its title from the well-known song of the same name by Henri Salvador.

== Cast ==
- Nastassja Kinski as Juliette
- Jean-Hugues Anglade as Clément Potrel
- Michel Piccoli as Raoul Bergeron
- Jean-Claude Brialy as Frédéric
- Souad Amidou as Farida
- Jean-Paul Roussillon as Jacques
- Jean-Luc Porraz as Jean-Luc
- Sophie d'Aulan as Diane
- Catherine Jacob as Nurse
