= La Soif de l'or =

- French theatrical release poster
- Directed by: Gérard Oury
- Written by: Christian Clavier; Marcel Jullian; Gérard Oury
- Produced by: Alain Poiré
- Starring: Tsilla Chelton; Catherine Jacob; Christian Clavier
- Cinematography: Tonino Delli Colli
- Edited by: Michele Boehm; Pierre Gillette
- Music by: Vladimir Cosma
- Production company: Gaumont
- Distributed by: Gaumont Buena Vista International
- Release date: 31 August 1993
- Running time: 81 minutes
- Country: France
- Language: French
- Budget: $7,6 million
- Box office: $11.4 million

La Soif de l'or (The Thirst for Gold) is a 1993 French comedy film directed by Gérard Oury.

== Plot ==
Urbain Donnadieu, CEO of a prefabricated house company, was raised by his grandmother Zézette, in the cult of profit. Stingy of first class, he has stolen 60,000 francs per day from his company, that he transformed in gold bars. He plans on transporting them to Switzerland. So he decides to hide the gold bars in the bricks of one of the houses that he must deliver, an idea that he is going to regret. Everything would go well if his wife Fleurette, a tax agent, and her lover Jacques, chauffeur and Urbain's best friend, would get involved in this plan.

== Cast ==
- Christian Clavier as Urbain Donnadieu
- Tsilla Chelton as Mémé Zézette
- Catherine Jacob as Fleurette
- Philippe Khorsand as Jacques
- Bernard Haller as Le comte Muller
- Marine Delterme as Laurence Auger
- Pascal Greggory as Jean-Louis Auger
- Patrick Le Luherne as L'abbé Furteaux
- Jacky Nercessian as Le représentant
