= XXL (film) =

1997 French comedy film

- Theatrical release poster
- Directed by: Ariel Zeitoun
- Written by: Florence Quentin
- Produced by: Alain Goldman; Patrick Batteux
- Starring: Gérard Depardieu; Michel Boujenah
- Cinematography: Philippe Pavans de Ceccatty
- Edited by: Hugues Darmois
- Music by: Goran Bregović
- Production companies: Gaumont; Légende Entreprises
- Distributed by: Gaumont Buena Vista International
- Release date: 10 December 1997
- Running time: 95 minutes
- Country: France
- Language: French
- Budget: $11 million
- Box office: $2.2 million

XXL is a 1997 French comedy film directed by Ariel Zeitoun and written by Florence Quentin, and starring Michel Boujenah, Gérard Depardieu, and Elsa Zylberstein. Produced by Patrick Batteux and Alain Goldman, the film derives its humor primarily from the contrasts between different communities in France — specifically, Jews and Bougnats.

== Plot ==
Alain Berrebi, a Jewish businessman, runs a ready-to-wear clothing company with his sister, Lorène, in the Sentier neighborhood of Paris. To stay ahead of aggressive competition from Chinese wholesalers, Alain plans to acquire a nearby shop owned by David Stern, the father of his fiancée, Arlette. However, Mr. Stern learns that Baptiste Bourdalou, a farmer from Auvergne who saved him from deportation during World War II, has passed away. When they travel to Auvergne for the funeral, they become acquainted with Baptiste's son, Jean, a meeting that quickly turns Alain's business plans and personal life upside down. Out of a sense of moral debt to the Bourdalou family, Mr. Stern agrees to sell the shop to Jean, who intends to convert it into a brasserie. To make matters worse, Jean begins to win over Arlette, locking the two men in a fierce commercial and romantic rivalry.

== Cast ==
- Gérard Depardieu : Jean Bourdalou
- Michel Boujenah : Alain Berrebi
- Catherine Jacob : Lorène Benguigui
- Elsa Zylberstein : Arlette Stern
- Emmanuelle Riva : Sonia Stern
- Maurice Chevit : David Stern
- Pascal Elbé : François Stern
- Gina Lollobrigida : Gaby Berrebi
- Gad Elmaleh : Sammy
- Pierre Zimmer : Baptiste Bourdalou
- Eriq Ebouaney : Omar
- Karen Strassman : Press Officer
- Samir Guesmi : Pizza delivery
- Vincent Tulli : The driver

== Reception ==
XXL sold 289,689 admissions in France, which made it a major box-office flop given its substantial budget. Le Parisien compared it unfavorably with La Vérité si je mens (Would I Lie to You?), another French comedy about the Jewish textile community which had been released to great success several months earlier. The review called XXL a bad mash-up between that film and Happiness Is in the Field, another successful comedy that had been also written by Florence Quentin. It also noted that while the pairing of Gérard Depardieu and Jewish comedian Michel Boujenah appeared promising, the result was a disappointment, with both performers appearing uninvolved in the film's stereotypical humor.

== Home media ==
The film was released on DVD, and on VOD on several streaming services including Canal+.
