= La Méthode Bourchnikov =

- Film poster
- Directed by: Grégoire Sivan
- Written by: Grégoire Sivan; Frédéric Chansel; Noémie de Lapparent
- Produced by: Pascal Judelewicz
- Starring: Lorànt Deutsch; Dieudonné; Catherine Jacob; Daniel Prévost
- Cinematography: Stephen Barcelo; Kathy Sebbah
- Edited by: Benjamin Weill
- Music by: Matthieu Langlet
- Production companies: La Fémis; Les Films de Cinéma
- Distributed by: EuropaCorp; Les Films de Cinéma
- Release date: 4 April 2004
- Running time: 13 minutes
- Country: France
- Language: French
- Budget: $150,000

La Méthode Bourchnikov is a 2004 French short animated film directed by Grégoire Sivan.

== Cast ==
- Lorànt Deutsch as Alexandre Goübrick
- Dieudonné as Roman Goübrick
- Catherine Jacob as Sylvette Martin
- Daniel Prévost as The TV Host
- Macha Béranger as Elizabeth Dorsay
- Beppe Chierici as Michello Bracchelloni
- Emanuel Booz as Max Byzance
- Prune Mascuro as Elizabeth Dorsay
- Pascale Clarke as The journalist

== Production ==
In 2004, the short was presented to the Angers Film Festival, the Clermont-Ferrand International Short Film Festival, the CFC Worldwide Short Film Festival, the French Film Festival in Japan and the Meudon Short Film Festival.

== Awards and nominations ==
| Year | Award | Category | Recipient | Result |
|---|---|---|---|---|
| 2004 | Angers European First Film Festival | French Short Film | Grégoire Sivan | Won |
| 2005 | César Awards | Best Short Film | Grégoire Sivan | Nominated |
