= Tatie Danielle =

- Directed by: Étienne Chatiliez
- Written by: Florence Quentin; Étienne Chatiliez
- Produced by: Charles Gassot
- Starring: Tsilla Chelton; Catherine Jacob; Isabelle Nanty; Neige Dolsky; Éric Prat; Laurence Février
- Cinematography: Philippe Welt
- Edited by: Catherine Renault
- Music by: Gabriel Yared; Gérard Kawczynski
- Distributed by: AMLF
- Release date: 1990
- Running time: 114 min.
- Country: France
- Language: English / French
- Box office: $16.7 million

Tatie Danielle (Auntie Danielle) is a 1990 French black comedy film directed by Étienne Chatiliez. It stars Tsilla Chelton as Auntie Danielle Billard.

The film's tagline is "Vous ne la connaissez pas encore, mais elle vous déteste déjà.", which translates to "You may not know her yet, but she hates you already."

== Plot ==
Danielle Billard, aged 82, is a childless widow of an army colonel. She lives in a small-town home in Auxerre with her faithful housekeeper, Odile. Things are not as they appear. Danielle is mean, cruel and malicious. When Odile "accidentally" dies, Danielle divides her estate between her grand-niece and grand-nephew, Jeanne and Jean-Pierre. She then goes to live in Paris with Jean-Pierre and his family. Although the family believes her to be an agreeable elderly lady, they soon discover her true colours.

The family goes on an extended vacation leaving their aunt in the care of a young woman, Sandrine. Little does Danielle know, she has finally met her match. Through many turbulent episodes these two women develop an ostensibly mutual love-hate "respect".

== Cast ==
- Tsilla Chelton as Auntie Danielle Billard
- Catherine Jacob as Catherine Billard
- Isabelle Nanty as Sandrine Vonnier
- Neige Dolsky as Odile Dombasle
- Éric Prat as Jean-Pierre Billard
- Karin Viard as Agathe
- Laurence Février as Jeanne Billard
- Mathieu Foulon as Jean-Marie Billard
- Gary Ledoux as Jean-Christophe "Totoff" Billard
- Virginie Pradal as Mrs. Lafosse
- Jacqueline Dufranne as Mrs. Ladurie
- Dominique MacAvoy as Mrs. Lemoine
- Bradley Harryman as Michael
- Madeleine Cheminat as Mrs. Mauprivet
- Nicole Chollet as Ginette Mauprivet
- André Wilms as Dr. Wilms
- Olivier Saladin as the butcher
- Lorella Cravotta as the butcher's wife
- Patrick Bouchitey as the beggar
- Évelyne Didi as the lady on the bus
- Frédéric Rossif as the man by the lake
- Jean-Pierre Miquel as the doctor

== Reception ==
Critic Roger Ebert awarded the film 3 out of 4 stars and wrote, "The most refreshing thing about 'Tatie Danielle' is that it allows an old woman the same freedom as any other movie character, to be unpleasant and mean-spirited. The movies too often sentimentalize old people. They are either wise or childlike, and in either case they seem to have outgrown the weaknesses of youth. Tatie Danielle hasn't. Maybe that’s what keeps her alive", adding "the movie’s last shot is perfect". Kevin Thomas of the Los Angeles Times also gave a positive review, praising the cast and Chatiliez's satire.

== Awards and nominations ==
Tatie Danielle was nominated for three César Awards:

- 1991 César Award for Best Actress nomination: Tsilla Chelton
- 1991 César Award for Best Supporting Actress nomination: Catherine Jacob
- 1991 César Award for Most Promising Actress nomination: Isabelle Nanty
