= Let's Hope it Lasts =

1996 French film

- Theatrical release poster
- Directed by: Michel Thibaud
- Written by: Christian Biegalski; Philippe Isard; Florence Gilardo
- Produced by: Jean-Claude Fleury
- Starring: Ticky Holgado; Gérard Darmon; Catherine Jacob; Emmanuelle Seigner
- Cinematography: Bruno Delbonnel
- Edited by: Maryline Monthieux
- Music by: Frank Langolff
- Production companies: Gaumont; Squares Films
- Distributed by: Gaumont Buena Vista International
- Release date: 7 February 1996
- Running time: 95 minutes
- Country: France
- Language: French
- Budget: $5 million
- Box office: $407.000

Let's Hope it Lasts or Pourvu que ça dure is a 1996 French comedy film, directed by Michel Thibaud.

== Plot ==
Motorcyclists in the police, Jojo and Victor are inseparable. One day, they must escort the deputy mayor of Nîmes, Jacques Dubreuil, accompanied by a beautiful woman.

== Cast ==
- Ticky Holgado as Joseph Ponty
- Gérard Darmon as Victor Brulin
- Jean-Pierre Bisson as Jacques Dubreuil
- Catherine Jacob as Christine Ponty
- Emmanuelle Seigner as Julie Neyrac
- Didier Bénureau as Jean-Michel Pichon
- Rebecca Potok as Chastaing
- Maurice Illouz as Lulu
- Marc Betton as Gauthier
- Akonio Dolo as Michel
- Olivier Pajot as Bolzano
- Jean-Marie Cornille as Gérard
- Ariel Figueroa as Sébastien
- Ludovic Paris as Max
