= Les Maris, les Femmes, les Amants =

- Film poster
- Directed by: Pascal Thomas
- Written by: Pascal Thomas; François Caviglioli
- Produced by: Charles Gassot
- Starring: Jean-François Stévenin; Catherine Jacob; Ludivine Sagnier; Michel Robin
- Cinematography: Renan Pollès
- Edited by: Nathalie Lafaurie
- Music by: Marine Rosier
- Release date: 4 January 1989
- Running time: 117 minutes
- Country: France
- Language: French
- Box office: $4.1 million

Les Maris, les Femmes, les Amants is a 1989 French comedy drama film directed by Pascal Thomas.

== Plot ==
On the Île de Ré, during the summer holidays, a group of husbands look after their children while their wives remain in Paris.

== Cast ==
- Jean-François Stévenin as Martin
- Susan Moncur as Dora
- Clément Thomas as Clément
- Emilie Thomas as Emilie
- Michel Robin as Tocanier
- Catherine Jacob as Marie-Françoise Tocanier
- Daniel Ceccaldi as Jacques
- Anne Guinou as Jacqueline
- Pierre Jean as Michel
- Damien Morel as Stef
- Ludivine Sagnier as Elodie
- Guy Marchand as Bruno
- Hélène Vincent as Odette
- Alexandra London as Brigitte
- Leslie Azzoulai as Chantal
- Catherine Bidaut as Annette
- Sabine Haudepin as Barbie
- Éric Lartigau as Guillaume
- Vanessa Guedj as Eleonore
- Olga Vincent as Olga
- Christiane Millet as Claire
- Danielle Gaudry as Kiki
- Héléna Manson as Dentist's mother
- Isabelle Petit-Jean as Pichard's widow
