= Les Nanas =

- ©Stand'Art 1985
- Directed by: Annick Lanoë
- Written by: Annick Lanoe; Chantal Pelletier
- Produced by: Lise Fayolle
- Starring: Marie-France Pisier; Dominique Lavanant; Macha Méril
- Cinematography: François Catonné
- Edited by: Joële Van Effenterre
- Music by: François Valery
- Distributed by: Stand'Art
- Release date: 30 January 1985
- Running time: 87 minutes
- Country: France
- Language: French
- Box office: $4.4 million

Les Nanas (The Chicks) is a 1985 French comedy with an entirely female cast, directed by Annick Lanoë.

== Plot ==
Christine is in her forties when she learns that her partner Robert has been having an affair for the past few months. As a liberated woman, Christine refuses to put up with this situation, and supported by her girlfriends who are themselves struggling to find their Mr Right, she takes steps to get in touch with her rival...

== Cast ==
- Marie-France Pisier as Christine
- Dominique Lavanant as Evelyne
- Macha Méril as Françoise
- Anémone as Odile
- Odette Laure as Christine 's mother
- Catherine Samie as Simone
- Juliette Binoche as Antoinette
- Clémentine Célarié as Éliane
- Marilú Marini as Mariana
- Caroline Loeb as Adèle
- Eva Ionesco as Miss France

Catherine Jacob appeared in an uncredited role.
