= Bonne Pomme =

- Directed by: Florence Quentin
- Written by: Florence Quentin; Alexis Quentin
- Produced by: Dominique Besnehard; Christine Gozlan; Genevieve Lemal; David Poirot-Gozlan
- Starring: Gérard Depardieu; Catherine Deneuve
- Cinematography: Pascal Gennesseaux
- Edited by: Beatrice Herminie
- Music by: Mathieu Lamboley
- Production companies: Mon Voisin Productions; Thelma Films
- Distributed by: ARP Sélection
- Release date: 30 August 2017
- Running time: 101 minutes
- Country: France
- Language: French
- Budget: $6.6 million
- Box office: $1.7 million

Bonne Pomme (English: Nobody's Perfect!) is a 2017 French comedy film directed by Florence Quentin, written by Florence Quentin and Alexis Quentin, and starring Gérard Depardieu and Catherine Deneuve.

== Plot ==
Gerard is tired of being taken for naive by his in-laws. He leaves everything and opens a garage in a village nestled at the bottom of the Gâtinais. In front of the garage, there is a lovely inn, run by Barbara, a beautiful, disconcerting, mysterious, unpredictable woman.

== Cast ==
- Gérard Depardieu as Gérard Morlet
- Catherine Deneuve as Barbara
- Guillaume de Tonquédec as The mayor
- Chantal Ladesou as Mémé Morillon
- Grégoire Ludig as Rico
- Gauthier Battoue as Manu
- Françoise Lépine as Nadine
- Blandine Bellavoir as Marylou
- Benjamin Voisin as Thomas
- Céline Jorrion as Arlette
- Anaël Snoek as Martine
- Nathalie Vignes as Madame Mangin
- Ben Manz as Anglais 1
- Tom Sharp as Anglais 2
