= Lili Rose =

- Directed by: Bruno Ballouard
- Written by: Bruno Ballouard
- Produced by: Fabrice Préel-Cléach; Clothilde Metral
- Starring: Salomé Stévenin; Mehdi Dehbi; Bruno Clairefond; Thomas Chabrol; Catherine Jacob
- Cinematography: Philippe Brelot
- Edited by: Antoine Le Bihen
- Production company: Offshore
- Distributed by: Zelig Films Distribution
- Release date: 22 October 2014
- Running time: 90 minutes
- Country: France
- Language: French

Lili Rose is a 2014 French film directed by Bruno Ballouard.

== Plot ==
Workers and poker players, Samir and Xavier are living day to day. They meet the pretty young bride Liza who thinks she has her future all mapped out.

== Cast ==
- Salomé Stévenin as Liza
- Mehdi Dehbi as Samir
- Bruno Clairefond as Xavier
- Thomas Chabrol as Pierrot
- Catherine Jacob as Pierrot's sister
- Xavier Robic as Franck
- Patrick Azam as Tony
- Abdelkrim Bahloul as Samir's uncle
- Freddy Viau as Freddy
- Claire Théodoly as Cécile
- Delphine Hecquet as Valérie
- Thierry Barbet as Michel
- Joseph Salou as Jojo
- Jeanne Clinchamp as Martine
- Sandrine Bodenes as Alice
- Olivier Quinzin as Simon
- Carine Bouquillon as Francine
- Gilles Janeyrand as Loulou
- Finnegan Oldfield as The pump attendant

== Production ==
Filming took place in Langres (Haute-Marne), as well as in Brignogan, Lesneven, Meneham and Plounéour-Trez (Finistère).
