= La Fille de l'air =

La fille de l'air
- Directed by: Maroun Bagdadi
- Written by: Florence Quentin; Nadine Vaujour; Dan Frank; Maroun Bagdadi
- Produced by: Jean-Claude Fleury; Farid Chaouche
- Starring: Béatrice Dalle; Hippolyte Girardot; Jean-Claude Dreyfus; Catherine Jacob
- Cinematography: Thierry Arbogast
- Edited by: Luc Barnier
- Music by: Gabriel Yared
- Release date: 1992
- Running time: 103 minutes
- Country: France
- Language: French

La fille de l'air is a 1992 French film directed by Maroun Bagdadi.

== Cast ==
- Béatrice Dalle as Brigitte
- Hippolyte Girardot as Philippe
- Jean-Claude Dreyfus as Marcel
- Catherine Jacob as Rose
- Thierry Fortineau as Daniel
- Roland Bertin as Maître Lefort
- Jean-Paul Roussillon as Raymond
- Isabelle Candelier as Jacqueline
- Liliane Rovère as The Mother
