= List of Merite =

- Tableau d'honneur
- Directed by: Charles Nemes
- Written by: Charles Nemes
- Starring: Guillaume de Tonquédec; Claude Jade; Philippe Khorsand
- Release date: 26 August 1992
- Running time: 97 min
- Country: France
- Language: French

List of Merite (Tableau d'honneur), also known as Honor Roll , is a 1992 French film directed by Charles Nemes, starring Guillaume de Tonquédec, Claude Jade, Philippe Khorsand and François Berléand.

== Synopsis ==
Jules (Guillaume de Tonquédec) is a student at the Charles Martel college in Saint Germain en Laye, a private school for the lazy children of well-off families. A riotous teenager, but rather passive, particularly in his relations with girls, Jules is secretly in love with Cécile (Cécile Pallas), a pretty girl who attends a nearby state school. Alain Denizet (François Berléand), an assistant teacher at the college, but also an eternally unemployed actor, becomes Jules friend by introducing him to the world of the theatre on Saturdays, a world more relaxed than that of his family. His lovely mother Gabrielle (Claude Jade) is betrayed by her husband Paul (Philippe Khorsand). In a humorous moment, Jules's mom has an embarrassing time shopping for condoms, which she is getting because she is thinking about having an affair with a teacher (Patrick Guillemin) of her son. A former student, Christian Ribet (Eric Elmosnino), violently shatters this fine balance, going as far as to threaten the college's financial situation...

"Contemplating an extramarital affair, Claude Jade attempts to discreetly shop for condoms, a cute twist on what is traditionally a teenage boy's awkward ordeal." (Variety, 1992)

List of Merite is the starting point of three young actors' careers: Guillaume de Tonquédec, Éric Elmosnino and Guillaume Gallienne.

== Cast ==
- Guillaume de Tonquédec: Jules Martin
- Claude Jade: Gabrielle Martin
- Philippe Khorsand: Paul Martin
- François Berléand: Alain Denizet
- Cécile Pallas: Cécile
- Éric Elmosnino: Christian Ribert
- Jean-Paul Roussillon: Croquebois
- Évelyne Buyle: Geneviève Fournet
- Patrick Guillemin: Pierre Vachette
- Kathy Kriegel: Simone Chandeau
- Mathias Mégard: Didier Portman
- Ste´phanie Ruaux: Marijo
- Léa Drucker: Delphine
- Guillaume Gallienne: Castagnier
