= L'Ex de ma vie =

- Directed by: Dorothée Sebbagh
- Written by: Dorothée Sebbagh; Fanny Chesnel; Marc Syrigas
- Produced by: Christine Rouxel; Marco Chimenz; Giovanni Stabilini; Riccardo Tozzi; Benjamin Hess
- Starring: Géraldine Nakache; Kim Rossi Stuart; Pascal Demolon; Catherine Jacob
- Cinematography: Gilles Porte
- Edited by: Laurent Rouan
- Production company: Les films du 24
- Distributed by: UGC
- Release date: 25 June 2014
- Running time: 80 minutes
- Country: France
- Language: French
- Budget: $9.2 million
- Box office: $1.5 million

L'Ex de ma vie (transl. The ex of my life) is a 2014 French comedy film directed by Dorothée Sebbagh.

== Plot ==
Ariane, a young French violinist, agrees inflamed marriage proposal Christen, an irresistible conductor. Only problem: she is still a little ... married! Separated for two years with Nino, an Italian schoolteacher with a strong character, she manages to convince him to follow her to Paris for divorce in 8 days flat. But their trip for two in the city of love looks much more eventful than expected ...

== Cast ==
- Géraldine Nakache as Ariane
- Kim Rossi Stuart as Nino
- Pascal Demolon as Christen
- Catherine Jacob as Daphné
- Sophie Cattani as Barbara
- Nicole Ferroni as The guide
