= Dickie-roi =

- Written by: Guy Lefranc; Françoise Mallet-Joris; Françoise Verny
- Directed by: Guy Lefranc
- Starring: Dave; Erick Desmarestz; Louison Roblin
- Music by: Marie-Paule Belle
- Country of origin: France
- No. of episodes: 6

Production
- Cinematography: Didier Tarot

Original release
- Network: TF1
- Release: 14 September – 19 October 1981

Dickie-roi is a 1981 French miniseries.

== Cast ==
- Dave as Dickie-Roi
- Erick Desmarestz as Roger Jannequin
- Louison Roblin as Janine
- Catherine Jacob as Anne-Marie
- Jean Benguigui as Alex
- Bernard Bauronne as M. Maurice
- Pierre Belot as M. Guérin
- Anne-Marie Jabraud as Mme Guérin
- Yves Bureau as Vanhof
- Liliane Coutanceau as Lucette
- Pauline Delfau as Pauline
- Luc Etienne as Martial
- Patrick Guillaumes as Jean-Pierre
- Marine Jolivet as Adeline
- Yves Marchand as Claude Wahl
- Renaud Marx as Dirk
- Nathalie Mazeas as Thérèse
- Jacqueline Rouillard as Elsa
- André Falcon as Simon Véry
- Marion Game as Marie Lou
- Hugues Quester as Dan
- René Morard as Serge
- Axelle Abbadie as Christine
- Gérard Caillaud as Father Paul
- Alain David as Jo
- Mireille Delcroix as Colette
- André Landais as François
- Michel Beaune as M. Hollmann
- André Reybaz as The Count of Sain
- Victor Garrivier as Pierre Lefèvre
- Louis Lyonnet as Attilio Faraggi
- Jacques Alric as Jean-Marie Lomelin
- André Chanal as Hubert Agnel
- Joseph Falcucci as The barman

== Production ==
This miniseries is based on the novel written by Françoise Mallet-Joris.
