= Life Is a Long Quiet River =

1988 French comedy film

- Film poster
- French: La vie est un long fleuve tranquille
- Directed by: Étienne Chatiliez
- Written by: Étienne Chatiliez; Florence Quentin
- Produced by: Charles Gassot; Florence Quentin
- Starring: Benoît Magimel; Hélène Vincent; André Wilms; Daniel Gélin; Catherine Jacob; Patrick Bouchitey
- Cinematography: Pascal Lebègue
- Edited by: Chantal Delattre
- Music by: Gérard Kawczynski
- Distributed by: MK2 Diffusion
- Release date: 3 February 1988
- Running time: 90 minutes
- Country: France
- Language: French
- Box office: $30.7 million

Life Is a Long Quiet River (French: La vie est un long fleuve tranquille) is a 1988 French comedy film directed by Étienne Chatiliez. Using the timeless question of nature versus nurture, the film offers a satirical perspective on society in the industrial north by contrasting the precarious lives of the working class with those of the affluent, church-going bourgeoisie.

== Plot ==
In a town in the far north of France, two large families lead very different lives, The Groseilles live in squalid social housing on benefits and petty crime. The odd one is 12-year-old Maurice, as criminal as the rest but tidy and intelligent. As for the Le Quesnoys, practising Catholics in a large detached house, he is regional director of the electricity company and she, apart from church work, looks after house and children. They are experiencing problems, however, with 12-year-old Bernadette.

Twelve years earlier, in the hospital on Christmas Eve, the obstetrician delivered two babies and went home to his wife. The nurse, his lover who had hoped for a tender evening with him, in rage swapped the little Groseille girl for the Le Quesnoy boy. Twelve years later the doctor's wife dies and the nurse, who all along hoped to replace her, is rejected. She writes notes to the Groseilles and the Le Quesnoys, confessing her misdeed, and a third note to the obstetrician. He hastily leaves town.

The Le Quesnoys decide to say nothing to Bernadette and to keep her, but 'adopt' Maurice as a son, bringing him to live with them. In exchange they offer a large cash sum (plus free electricity) to the Groseilles. Although diligent at school and obedient at home, Maurice quietly sells off family effects to accumulate a secret nest egg, and gives gifts to his former family and friends. One day when Bernadette says that she hates poor people, Maurice reveals to her her origins. She sneaks round to the Groseille home and, horrified at what she sees, returns to the mansions and locks herself in her room for weeks.

Maurice keeps in touch with the Groseilles, supporting them with things he removes from the Le Quesnoy home, and one day arranges for all the children of the two families (apart from the still sequestered Bernadette) to meet by the river to drink beer and swim. The eldest Le Quesnoy boy is soon in the long grass in the willing arms of the eldest Groseille girl.

When the Le Quesnoy children stagger home tousled and tipsy, Madame Le Quesnoy has a nervous collapse and takes to the bottle. Bernadette runs away, and is returned by the police. Monsieur Le Quesnoy takes her and the maid, who is five months pregnant to a lover she will not reveal, to a seaside cottage, with the others to follow at the end of the school term. In an adjoining seaside cottage is the nurse, who at last has the obstetrician to herself after he has suffered a stroke.

== Cast ==
- Benoît Magimel as Maurice "Momo" Groseille
- Valérie Lalonde as Bernadette Le Quesnoy
- Hélène Vincent as Madame Marielle Le Quesnoy
- André Wilms as Monsieur Jean Le Quesnoy
- Christine Pignet as Madame Marcelle Groseille
- Maurice Mons as Monsieur Frédéric "Frédo" Groseille
- Guillaume Hacquebart as Paul Le Quesnoy
- Emmanuel Cendrier as Pierre Le Quesnoy
- Jean-Brice Van Keer as Mathieu Le Quesnoy
- Praline Le Moult as Emmanuelle Le Quesnoy
- Axel Vicart as Franck Groseille
- Claire Prévost as Roselyne Groseille
- Tara Römer as Million Groseille (as Tara Romer)
- Jérôme Floch as Toc-Toc Groseille
- Sylvie Cubertafon as Ghislaine Groseille
- Catherine Jacob as Marie-Thérèse
- Patrick Bouchitey as Father Aubergé
- Daniel Gélin as Dr. Louis Mavial
- Catherine Hiegel as Josette

== Cult status ==
The film's initial box office success was due to clever marketing, including a trailer with no footage or scenes from the film, and a poster with only its title. In addition, the film didn't have any big names attached to it, except for veteran French actor Daniel Gelin. It was also the first feature film of Etienne Chatiliez who, until then, had a successful career directing commercials known for their quirky, whimsical style. The film attracted 2.5 million moviegoers, largely due to the word-of-mouth marketing it enjoyed.

Due in part to the film's being shown frequently on French television, it has gained something of a cult following among young French people. The song "Jésus Reviens", sung during a scene at a church, is recognisable to many French youth as one of the film's many satirical digs at the French Catholic bourgeois culture in the era it was filmed.

The 2009 film Neuilly sa mère ! was heavily influenced by Life is a Long Quiet River.

== Accolades ==
The film received 7 nominations at the César Awards :

Award	Category	Recipient	Result
César Awards	Best Supporting Actress	Hélène Vincent	Won
César Awards	Most Promising Actress	Catherine Jacob	Won
César Awards	Best First Feature Film	Étienne Chatiliez	Won
César Awards	Best Original Screenplay or Adaptation	Étienne Chatiliez; Florence Quentin	Won
César Awards	Best Film	Étienne Chatiliez	Nominated
César Awards	Best Supporting Actor	Patrick Bouchitey	Nominated
César Awards	Best Costume Design	Elisabeth Tavernier	Nominated
