= Messieurs les enfants =

- Directed by: Pierre Boutron
- Written by: Pierre Boutron; Daniel Pennac
- Produced by: Jean-François Fonlupt
- Starring: Pierre Arditi; François Morel; Zinedine Soualem; Catherine Jacob; Michel Aumont
- Cinematography: François Catonné
- Edited by: Jacques Witta
- Music by: Jean-Claude Petit
- Production companies: Ciby 2000; El Deseo; France 3
- Distributed by: Ciby Distribution
- Release date: 1 October 1997
- Running time: 100 min
- Country: France
- Language: French
- Budget: $5.3 million
- Box office: $735,000

Messieurs les enfants is a 1997 French comedy film, directed by Pierre Boutron.

== Plot ==
Caught out by their French teacher, Joseph, Igor and Nourdine end up with punishment for the following topic: "You wake up one morning and you see that in the night, you were transformed into adults. Completely distraught, you rush into your parent's room. They were transformed in children. Tell result." Unfortunately for them, the subject will become reality.

== Cast ==
- Pierre Arditi as Joseph Piritzkt / Pope Piritzky
- François Morel as Igor Laforgue / Pierre Laforgue
- Zinedine Soualem as Nourdine Kader / Ismaël Kader
- Catherine Jacob as Yolande
- Jean-Louis Richard as Albert Crastaing
- Michel Aumont as The principal
- Anne Jacquemin as Tatiana
- Nozha Khouadra as Rachida Kader
- Nathalie Auffret as Moune
- Jean-Claude Leguay as Eric
- Claire Borotra as Agnès
- Rose-Marie Scheffler as Madame Lehmann
- Valérie Vogt as Arlette
- Philippe Khorsand as The bailiff
- Tonino Benacquista as The superintendent
- Daniel Pennac & Pierre Boutron as The men in the car
