= Oui (film) =

- Directed by: Alexandre Jardin
- Written by: Alexandre Jardin; Pierre Palmade
- Produced by: Jean-Claude Fleury
- Starring: Catherine Jacob; Chiara Caselli; Pierre Palmade; Jean-Marie Bigard; Dany Boon; Claire Keim
- Cinematography: Manuel Teran
- Edited by: Maryline Monthieux
- Music by: Nicolas Jorelle
- Production company: Gaumont
- Distributed by: Gaumont Buena Vista International
- Release date: 4 December 1996
- Running time: 89 minutes
- Country: France
- Language: French
- Budget: $7 million
- Box office: $1.1 million

Oui is a 1996 French comedy film, directed by Alexandre Jardin.

== Plot ==
Nine friends revisit their sex life and rather than enjoy, trying to rejoice.

== Cast ==
- Catherine Jacob as Nathalie
- Miguel Bosé as Hugo
- Chiara Caselli as Alice
- Pierre Palmade as Octave
- Jean-Marie Bigard as Stéphane
- Daniel Russo as Polo
- Dany Boon as Wilfried
- Claire Keim as Marie
- Roland Marchisio as Hervé
- Sylvie Loeillet as Agathe
- Agnès Soral
- Alexandre Jardin
