= My Father the Hero (1994 film) =

- Theatrical release poster
- Directed by: Steve Miner
- Screenplay by: Francis Veber; Charlie Peters
- Based on: Mon père, ce héros by Gérard Lauzier
- Produced by: Jacques Bar; Jean-Louis Livi
- Starring: Gérard Depardieu; Katherine Heigl; Dalton James; Lauren Hutton; Faith Prince
- Cinematography: Daryn Okada
- Edited by: Marshall Harvey
- Music by: David Newman
- Production company: Touchstone Pictures
- Distributed by: Gaumont Buena Vista International (France); Buena Vista Pictures Distribution (United States)
- Release date: February 4, 1994
- Running time: 90 minutes
- Countries: France; United States
- Languages: French; English
- Box office: $45 million

My Father the Hero is a 1994 comedy-drama directed by Steve Miner and starring Gérard Depardieu and Katherine Heigl. It is an English-language remake of the 1991 French film Mon père, ce héros, which starred Depardieu in a similar role.

== Plot ==
Nicole is 14 and goes on vacation in the Bahamas with her father André Arnel. She falls in love with 17-year-old Ben but her dad finds him way too old for her. Tired of being treated like a child, Nicole makes up a whole story to make herself more interesting, where André is actually her lover who saved her from a life of debauchery a few years earlier. André is unaware of his daughter's lies and the reputation she is building him, leading to a cascade of misunderstandings and misled confrontations.

== Cast ==
- Gérard Depardieu as André Arnel, Nicole's father
- Katherine Heigl as Nicole Arnel, André's daughter
- Dalton James as Ben
- Lauren Hutton as Megan Arnel, André's ex-wife and Nicole's mother
- Faith Prince as Diana
- Stephen Tobolowsky as Mike
- Ann Hearn as Stella
- Robyn Peterson as Doris
- Frank Renzulli as Fred
- Manny Jacobs as Raymond
- Jeffrey Chea as Pablo
- Stephen Burrows as Hakim
- Michael Robinson as Tom
- Robert Miner as Mr. Porter
- Betty Miner as Mrs. Porter
- Emma Thompson as Isobel, André's girlfriend (uncredited)
- Roberto Escobar as Alberto

== Filming ==
Filming occurred during the summer of 1993. It was filmed on Paradise Island, Bahamas at the One & Only Resort, which was later renamed The Ocean Club by Four Seasons Resort.

== Reception ==
=== Box office ===
The film debuted at number 4 at the US box office behind Ace Ventura: Pet Detective, Mrs. Doubtfire and Philadelphia. It went on to gross $25.5 million in the United States and Canada and $19.3 million internationally for a worldwide total of $44.8 million.

=== Critical response ===
The film received negative reviews from critics. Janet Maslin wrote, in her review of the film for The New York Times, that "nothing else about the film is moving, but its Bahamian beachfront scenery just might make you cry." Peter Rainer of the Los Angeles Times opened his Los Angeles Times review of the film by writing:

Why does Hollywood persist in remaking French sex comedies? Most of the originals—including "The Tall Blonde Man With One Black Shoe" and "Les Fugitifs," remade as "Three Fugitives"—weren't all that sexy or funny to begin with. And with the exception of "Three Men and a Little Lady," none of these remakes, which also include "The Toy," "Blame It on Rio," "Partners" and "Buddy Buddy," has been a smash hit. Or sexy. Or funny.

“My Father, the Hero,” remade from a French comedy virtually unseen in this country, at least has Gerard Depardieu in the cast, which gives it a pedigree. Depardieu, who has appeared in every French film for the past 20 years, give or take a few, makes his third appearance in a Hollywood movie. (The first two were “Green Card” and “1492: Conquest of Paradise.”) It’s enjoyable watching Depardieu wrap his mouth around the English language; he seems to enjoy it as much as we do. Less enjoyable is watching Depardieu (or, in long shot, his stunt double) water skiing and wallowing through treacherous shoals. (A friend said he reminded her of Shamu.)

Depardieu may be fun to watch but he's not enough reason to see the movie.

Roger Ebert wrote that "if Depardieu seems right at home in 'My Father the Hero,' perhaps that is because only two years ago he made a French film called 'Mon Pere, Ce Heros,' with exactly the same plot. I saw it, and would say it was more or less exactly as appealing as this English version. Once was a time when Hollywood would buy the rights to French hits ("Three Men and a Cradle") and remake them. Now they buy the recycling rights as soon as the original is released, and hold it out of the American market, which in this case was no great loss."

On Rotten Tomatoes, the film has a rating of 21%, based on 14 reviews, with an average score of 4.4/10.

=== Year-end lists ===
- Top 10 worst (alphabetical order, not ranked) – William Arnold, Seattle Post-Intelligencer
- Worst (not ranked) – Bob Ross, The Tampa Tribune

== Soundtrack ==
The film featured music and appearances by the Bahamian junkanoo band Baha Men. The group's songs create the movie's island soundtrack.

- "Back to the Island"
- "Mo' Junkanoo"
- "Gin and Coconut Water (Traditional)"
- "Land of the Sea and Sun"
- "Oh, Father"
- "Island Boy"
