= Annick Lanoë =

French film director, screenwriter and author

- Born: Paris, France
- Occupation: Film director

Annick Lanoë (born 1948) is a French film director, screenwriter and author. She has directed and written two films Les Nanas and Les Mamies. She is also the author of a number of books including Qui est sous ma couette.

She was born in Paris.

== Filmography ==
- 1985 : Les Nanas
- 1992 : Les mamies
