= My Father the Hero (1991 film) =

Mon père, ce héros
- Directed by: Gérard Lauzier
- Written by: Gérard Lauzier
- Produced by: Jean-Louis Livi
- Starring: Gérard Depardieu; Marie Gillain; Catherine Jacob
- Cinematography: Patrick Blossier
- Edited by: Georges Klotz
- Music by: François Bernheim
- Production company: Film Par Film
- Distributed by: AMLF
- Release date: 1991
- Running time: 105 minutes
- Country: France
- Language: French
- Box office: $9.3 million

My Father the Hero (original French title: Mon père, ce héros) is a 1991 French film directed by Gérard Lauzier and starring Gérard Depardieu. An English language remake of the movie was made in 1994 with Gérard Depardieu reprising his role.

The name of the film comes from a famous poem by the French poet Victor Hugo, "Mon père, ce héros," published in 1859.

== Plot ==
André, a Frenchman who is divorced from his wife, takes his beautiful 14-year-old daughter, Véronique, on vacation to Mauritius. She is desperate to appear as a woman and not a girl. In order to impress a local boy, Benjamin, she makes up more and more fantastic stories, starting with André being her lover – a sugar Daddy. André is desperate to make Véronique happy and so plays along with her increasingly elaborate invented stories about her life.

== Cast ==
- Gérard Depardieu as André Arnel
- Marie Gillain as Véronique "Véro" Arnel
- Catherine Jacob as Christelle
- Patrick Mille as Benjamin
- Charlotte de Turckheim as Irina
- Gérard Hérold as Patrick
- Jean-François Rangasamy as Pablo
- Koomaren Chetty as Karim
- Benoît Allemane

== Production ==
Filmed on location on Mauritius, the film introduces Marie Gillain as the young Véronique earning her a nomination for the César Award for Most Promising Actress.
