= Alès Film Festival =

The Alès Film Festival (French: Le Festival Cinéma d'Alès Itinérances) is a film festival held annually in the commune of Alès located within the Languedoc-Roussillon region of southern France. Having begun as a small, volunteer-run exhibition, the event now screens a selection of approximately 200 films from numerous genres and countries and regularly attracts around 45,000 visitors over ten days with a budget of approximately €600,000.

Founded in 1983 as simply the Festival Cinéma d'Alès, it received its additional moniker of Itinérances in 1993 to reflect its eclectic choice of films and vague themes of wandering.

== History ==
The festival has its roots in a small film workshop set up in Alès by Malik Kerdouche, Jacques Héneaux and Yves Fenouil in 1979 whose purpose was to inspire locals and introduce them to the techniques of filmmaking. With the additional involvement of Marc Aubaret, the inaugural Alès Film Festival was held on 7 - 12 March 1983, showing twelve films over six days with no set theme, attracting 1,500 visitors.

Starting with the second event in 1984, which concentrated on Hungarian cinema, the festival focused on films from specific countries each year. This tradition was abandoned in 1991 and a new theme was sought; after inspiration from Finnish director Aki Kaurismäki's visit in 1993, the festival settled on the theme of wandering and has since been known as Itinérances.

== Programmes ==
Every year the festival hosts the following to the public:

- Approximately thirty feature-length previews and unreleased films
- Themed retrospectives comprising a selection of fiction, documentaries, animated films and ciné-concerts (silent films with a live soundtrack) from all genres and eras
- Jeune Public: a series of events aimed at children and young adults including a number of films, a competition open to young people to write critical reviews and small number of short films produced by film students.
- Special screenings for people with visual or hearing impairments
- Tributes to filmmakers, featuring a selection of their works and appearances in front of an audience

== Venues ==
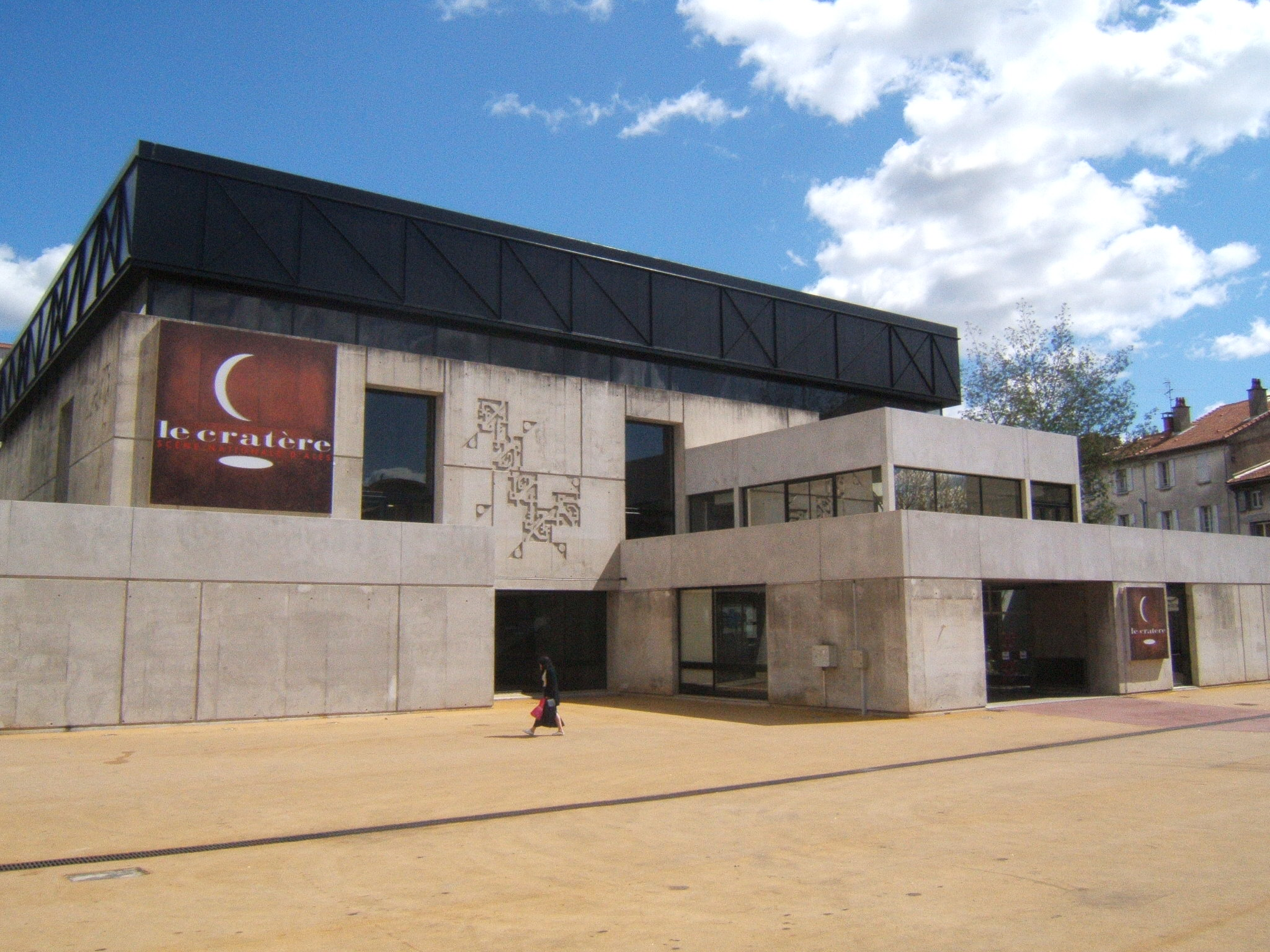
Le Cratère is the main venue for the festival

The festival is spread out over several sites within the town:

- Le Cratère - the principal theatre within Alès, with two rooms with a capacity of 850 and 200 seats
- Les Arcades bis - cinema with two screens let for the festival
- Le Capitole - concert hall
- Médiathèque d'Alès - Alphonse Daudet - library which hosts screenings within its forum

Additionally, the Musée Pierre-André Benoit and Musée du Colombier are local museums which display expositions relating to the festival.

== Awards ==
Each year, a number of short films are awarded prizes as chosen by either the public or the jury in the following categories:

- Prix du public - €1,500
- Le Grand Prix du Jury - €1,500
- Le Prix Spécial du Jury - €1,000
- Award for original music
- Prix Ciné Court - the winner is awarded broadcast of their short film on the Ciné+ channel
- Le Prix de l'Option - from a jury of students
