= Marion Game =

Moroccan-born French actress (1938–2023)

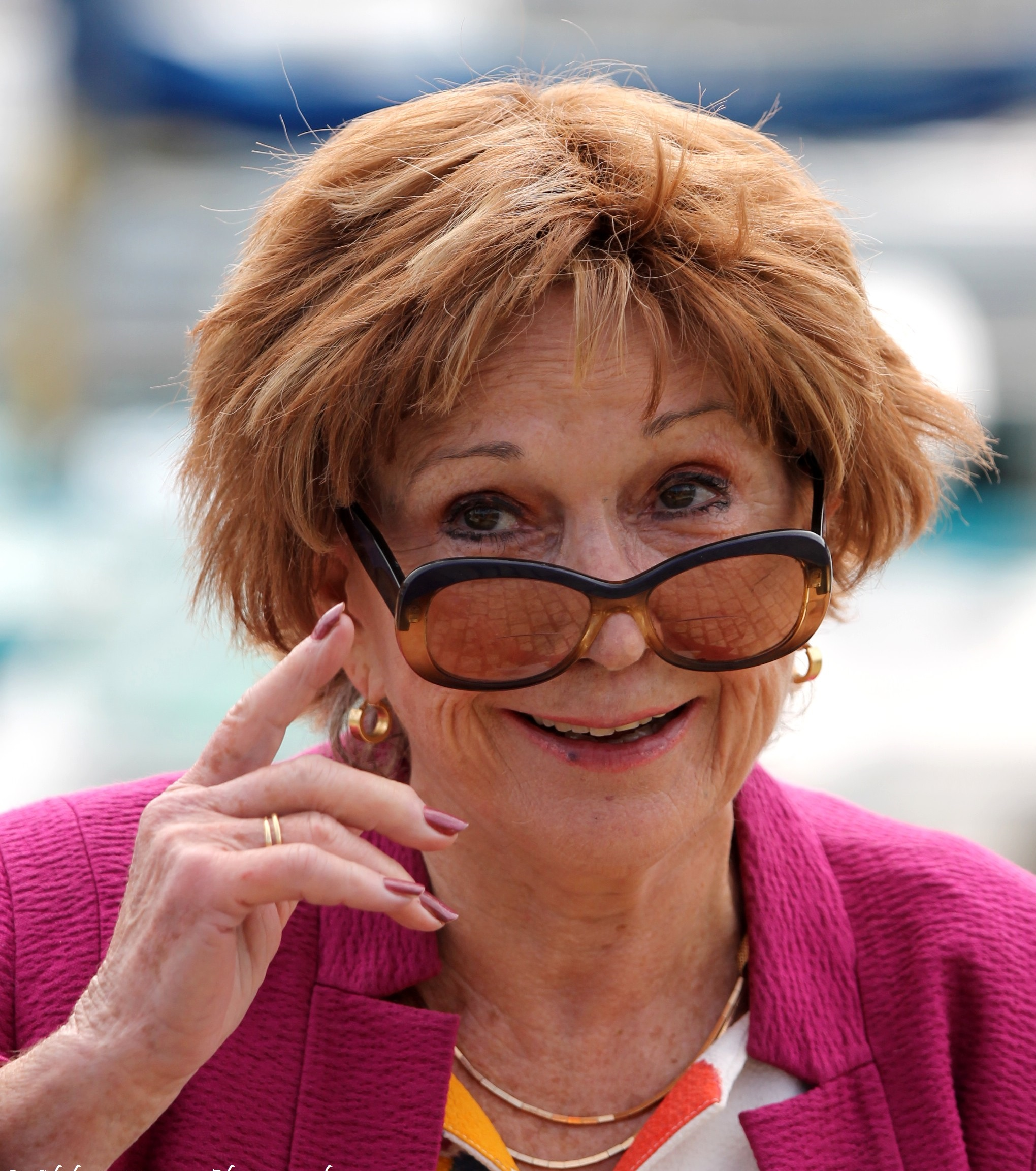
- Game in 2015
- Born: 31 July 1938; Casablanca, Morocco
- Died: 23 March 2023 (aged 84); Clamart, Île-de-France, France
- Occupation: Actress
- Years active: 1967–2023
- Known for: Huguette in Scènes de ménages

Marion Game (31 July 1938 – 23 March 2023) was a Moroccan-born French actress.

Game died in Clamart, Île-de-France on 23 March 2023, at the age of 84.

== Filmography ==
Year	Title	Role	Director	Notes
1967	Les poneyttes	uncredited	Joël Le Moigné	
1968	Les demoiselles de Suresnes	Muriel	Pierre Goutas	TV series
1969	Le survivant	Gracieuse	Louis Grospierre	TV movie
1970	Allô police		Pierre Goutas (2)	TV series (1 episode)
1970	La liberté en croupe	Paméla	Édouard Molinaro	
1971	Le Cri du cormoran le soir au-dessus des jonques	Mirabelle	Michel Audiard	
1971	Êtes-vous fiancée à un marin grec ou à un pilote de ligne?		Jean Aurel	
1971	Love Hate	Paula Cavalier	Jean-Pierre Mocky	
1971	Les bidasses en folie	Crème	Claude Zidi	
1972	François Gaillard	Valérie Brignoud	Jacques Ertaud	TV series (1 episode)
1973	Les Cinq Dernières Minutes	Claudine Mareuil	Claude Loursais	TV series (1 episode)
1973	Les malheurs de la comtesse	Philo	Bernard Deflandre	TV movie
1973	Un homme, une ville	Edith Lansac	Joseph Drimal	TV series
1973	La dernière bourrée à Paris	Lucie	Raoul André	
1974	La grande nouba	The perfumery's owner	Christian Ardan	
1974	Gil Blas de Santillane	Herminia	Jean-Roger Cadet	TV series
1974	Y'a un os dans la moulinette	Flora	Raoul André (2)	
1974	Malaventure	Myriam	Joseph Drimal (2)	TV series (1 episode)
1974	Histoires insolites		Édouard Molinaro (2)	TV series (1 episode)
1974	Les brigades du Tigre	Thérèse	Victor Vicas	TV series (1 episode)
1975	C'est pas parce qu'on a rien à dire qu'il faut fermer sa gueule...	Lulu	Jacques Besnard	
1975	Vous ne l'emporterez pas au paradis	Nadine	François Dupont-Midi	
1975	Les onze mille verges	Hélène	Eric Lipmann	
1975	Splendeurs et misères des courtisanes	Aurore	Maurice Cazeneuve	TV mini-series
1976	Oublie-moi, Mandoline	Frédérique	Michel Wyn	
1976	L'acrobate	Lili	Jean-Daniel Pollet	
1976	Les infidèles	Suzy	Alain Dhénaut	TV movie
1976	The Gallant Lords of Bois-Doré	Dame Belinde / Prosperine	Bernard Borderie	
1977	La fille d'Amérique	Michèle	David Newman	
1977	Les rebelles	Solange Tarricues	Pierre Badel	TV movie
1977	Attention chien méchant	Catherine	Roland-Bernard	TV movie
1978	Claudine	Léonie	Édouard Molinaro (3)	TV series (1 episode)
1978	La tortue sur le dos	Sylvie	Luc Béraud	
1980	Frénésie tzigane	Rodica	Georges Paumier	TV movie
1980	Le mandarin	Marthe	Patrick Jamain	TV movie
1980	Voulez-vous un bébé Nobel ?	The Presenter	Robert Pouret	
1981	Nana	Zoé	Maurice Cazeneuve (2)	TV mini-series (4 episodes)
1981	La route fleurie	Lorette	Jean-Roger Cadet (2)	TV movie
1981	Dickie-roi	Marie Lou	Guy Lefranc	TV mini-series (4 episodes)
1982	Les brigades du Tigre	The Barmaid	Victor Vicas (2)	TV series (1 episode)
1982	Spéciale dernière	Gina Malloy	Pierre Desfons	TV movie
1982	Sweet Hours	Amparo	Carlos Saura	
1982	Julien Fontanes, magistrat	Sonia	Guy-André Lefranc (2)	TV series (1 episode)
1983	Mon curé chez les Thaïlandaises	Georgette	Robert Thomas	
1983	Les Dalton en cavale	Voix	Joseph Barbera; William Hanna	
1968-84	Au théâtre ce soir	Various Characters	Pierre Sabbagh	TV series (12 episodes)
1985	La dérapade		Étienne Périer	TV movie
1985	Parking	The costumer	Jacques Demy	
1985	Le facteur de Saint-Tropez	Chantal Sagazan	Richard Balducci	
1987	Chahut-bahut		Jean Sagols	TV mini-series
1989	Blancs cassés	Hélène	Philippe Venault	
1990	Lunes de miel		Alain Lombardi	TV series
1991	Cas de divorce	Jeanne Ducas	Gérard Espinasse	TV series (1 episode)
1991	Besoins		Fabien Beauger; Nicolas Royer	Short
1992	King Arthur and the Knights of Justice	Morgana	Stephan Martinière; Charlie Sansonetti	TV series (1 episode)
1993	Le galopin	Ginette	Serge Korber	TV movie
1996	Un dimanche chez les Pinto		Yvette Caldas	TV Short
1997	Le cri du silence	The judge	Jacques Malaterre	TV movie
1997	Quai n° 1	Babette	Patrick Jamain (2)	TV series (3 episodes)
1998	Un père inattendu	Suzanne	Alain Bonnot	TV movie
1998	Au coeur de la loi	Édith Audemard		TV series (1 episode)
1999	La route à l'envers	The coffee's owner	Chantal Picault	TV movie
1999	Madame le proviseur	Valérie	Jean-Marc Seban	TV series (1 episode)
1999	Tout tout près	Bibiche	Fabrice Maruca	Short
2003	72 heures			TV series (1 episode)
2003	Commissaire Moulin	Mme Guyomard	Jean-Luc Breitenstein	TV series (1 episode)
2006	Asterix and the Vikings	Bonemine's voice	Stefan Fjeldmark; Jesper Møller	
2006	Capitaine Casta: Amélie a disparu	Roberte	Joyce Buñuel	TV movie
2006	Commissaire Moulin	Mme Guyomard	Jean-Luc Breitenstein (2)	TV series (1 episode)
1999-2008	Boulevard du Palais	Madame Rivière	Various Director	TV series (27 episodes)
2008	Manhunt	Raïssa	Laurent Jaoui	TV movie
2010	Alice Nevers: Le juge est une femme	Audes Lattès	René Manzor	TV series (1 episode)
2010	Plus belle la vie	Andrée Boher	Various Director	TV series (8 episodes)
2010	Dernière station avant l'autoroute	Charline	Serge Sarve	Video
2010	Elasto-Culbuto	Betty, Granma Selma's voices	Nathalie Kauffmann; Romain Villemaine	TV series
2009–2023	Scènes de ménages	Huguette	Francis Duquet	TV series (1504++ Episodes)
