= Alexandre Jardin =

French writer and film director (born 1965)

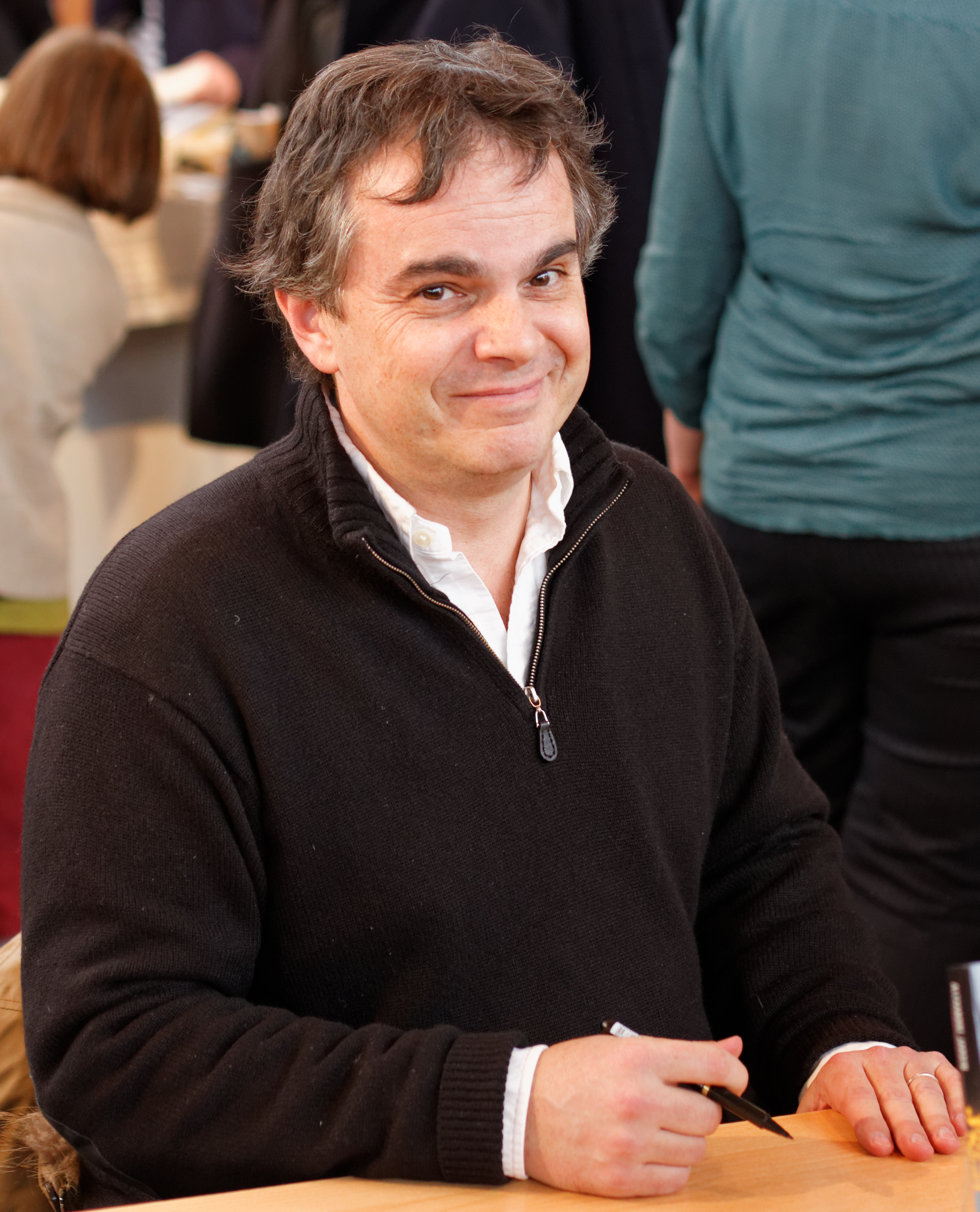
- Born: 14 April 1965 (age 61)
- Writing career
- Language: French
- Notable work: Le Zèbre
- Notable awards: Prix Femina

Alexandre Jardin (French pronunciation: [alɛksɑ̃dʁ ʒaʁdɛ̃]; born 14 April 1965) is a French writer, film director and winner of the Prix Femina, 1988, for Le Zèbre.

== Biography ==
Alexandre Jardin was born on 14 April 1965 in Paris, in the commune of Neuilly-sur-Seine ( Hauts-de-Seine ) in the department of Hauts-de-Seine. He has two brothers, one of whom is the film director, screenwriter and actor Frédéric Jardin, and a half-sister. He has five children from two marriages. Like his father, the writer and screenwriter Pascal Jardin ( 1934 - 1980 ), Alexandre received a degree in political science .

While studying at the university, he wrote his first novel, Headlong ( Bille en tête ), for which he received the French literary prize for Best Debut Novel ( Prix du Premier Roman) in 1986 .

In 1988 he published the novel "Zebra" ( Le Zèbre ), for which he received the French literary prize " Prix Femina ". In 1992, the film "Zebra" was made based on this novel.

In 1993, based on his novel Fanfan, he made the film Fanfan, which received high praise and won the love of viewers in many countries around the world.

In 1997 he wrote an autobiographical novel about the need for paternal recognition, “ Le Zubial ” ( Zubial was his father ’s nickname ).

In 2004, he published three versions of the novel " Les Coloriés ": one intended for adults, the other two for children.

== Filmography ==
- 1989 : Headlong / Bille en tête — co-written with Carlo Cotti
- 1991 : Gawin / Gawin - screenplay co-author with Arnaud Sélignac
- 1991 : The Keys to Paradise / Les clés du paradis — co-author of the script with Philippe de Broca, actor (role of a young writer visiting Olga)
- 1992 : Le Zèbre - Writer (novel)
- 1993 : Fanfan - Director, Writer
- 1996 : Oui - Director, Writer & Actor
- 2000 : The Professor / Le prof — screenwriter, director
- 2013 : The Real Life of a Teacher / La vraie vie des profs — co-written with Emmanuel Klotz and Albert Pereira - Lazaro
