= Florence Quentin =

French director and screenwriter

- Born: 5 September 1946 (age 80); Bort-les-Orgues, France
- Occupations: Director, Screenwriter
- Years active: 1983–present

Florence Quentin (5 September 1946) is a French César Award winning director and screenwriter. She mostly work with Catherine Jacob and Étienne Chatiliez.

== Filmography ==
Year	Title	Role	Box office	Notes
1983	À Nos Amours	Assistant Director	$7.1 million	Directed by Maurice Pialat
1984	Sauvage et beau	Assistant Director	$4.2 million	Documentary directed by Frédéric Rossif & Jean-Charles Cuttoli
1987	Le coeur musicien	Assistant Director		Documentary directed by Frédéric Rossif
1988	Life Is a Long Quiet River	Writer & Producer	$30.7 million	Directed by Étienne Chatiliez; César Award for Best Original Screenplay or Adaptation
1990	Tatie Danielle	Writer	$16.7 million	Directed by Étienne Chatiliez
1992	À demain	Producer	$62.000	Directed by Didier Martiny
1992	La Fille de l'air	Writer		Directed by Maroun Bagdadi
1995	Happiness Is in the Field	Writer	$32.3 million	Directed by Étienne Chatiliez; Nominated - César Award for Best Original Screenplay or Adaptation
1997	XXL	Writer	$2.2 million	Directed by Ariel Zeitoun
2001	J'ai faim !!!	Director & Writer	$4.6 million	
2003	Je reste !	Writer	$5.6 million	Directed by Diane Kurys
2005	Olé !	Director & Writer	$19.9 million	
2008	Leur morale... et la nôtre	Director & Writer	$1.9 million	
2012	L'oncle Charles	Writer & Actress	$4.3 million	
2017	Bonne Pomme	Director & Writer		
