= Étienne Chatiliez =

French film director

- Born: 17 June 1952 (age 74); Roubaix, France

Étienne Chatiliez (French: [etjɛn ʃatilje]; born 17 June 1952) is a French film director.

== Life and career ==
He was born in Roubaix, France, the son of Pierre Chatiliez, an insurance worker, and Denise Rateau,, and grew up in Marcq-en-Barœul near Lille with his elder brother and sister. He studied at the Lycée Yves-Kernanec in Marcq-en-Barœul.

Chatiliez began his career as an editor at Europe 1 and then for an advertising agency CLM&BBDO where he spent seven years as a writer editor. He edited many television adverts, winning several awards, before moving into cinema..

With an assistant in publicity Florence Quentin his move to the big screen was a huge success, and La Vie est un long fleuve tranquille launched many catchphrases, in "an acerbic, grating, insolent comedy", presenting two utterly contrasted families the bourgeois Le Quesnoy, and the proletarian Groseille. In this and subsequent films, he scratches away the surface of decorum and family myths, with an abrasive humou where the audience are both disturbed and amused, and which make the viewer uncomfortable yet touch them deeply.

In 2002 he was awarded the Ordre des Arts et des Lettres.

== Filmography ==
- 1988 - Life is a Long Quiet River (won Cesars for Best First Feature Film and Best Original Screenplay or Adaptation)
- 1990 - Tatie Danielle
- 1995 - Happiness is in the Field
- 2000 - Drugs! (short segment entitled La Famille médicament)
- 2001 - Tanguy
- 2004 - La confiance règne
- 2008 - Agathe Cléry
- 2012 - L'oncle Charles
- 2019 - Tanguy Is Back

== Awards ==
- Best Original Screenplay or Adaptation
- Best Director
- Cesar for Best Advertising Film
