= Théâtre Tristan-Bernard =

Private Parisian theatre

Coordinates: 48.8789°N 2.3192°E

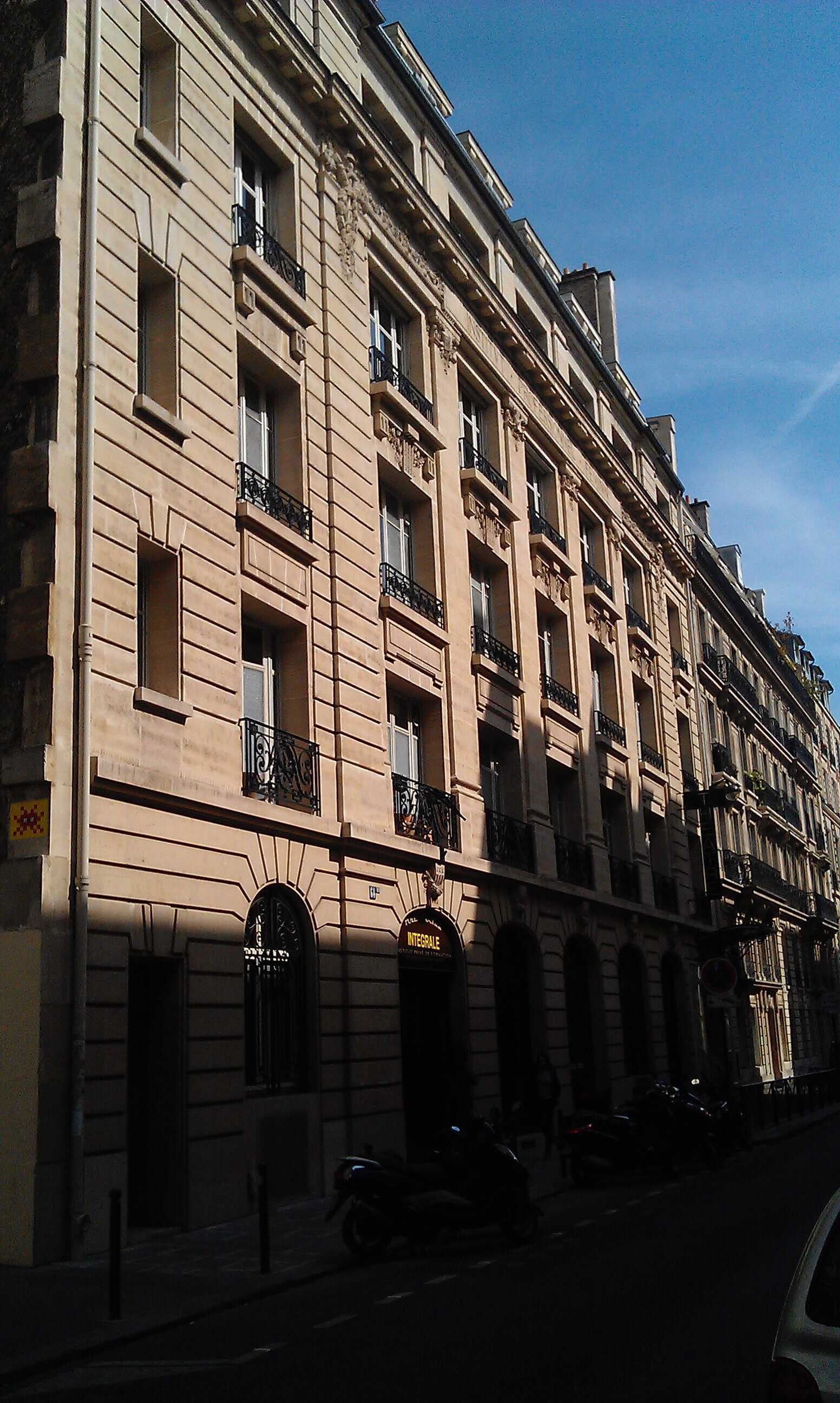
Façade.

The théâtre Tristan-Bernard is a private Parisian theatre located at 64 rue du Rocher in the 8th arrondissement of Paris.

== History ==
Built in 1911 by the foundation Léopold-Bellan (which still owns it today) to host meetings and educational shows of its institution of young girls, the venue opened in 1919 to the public under the name Théâtre Albert-I, in honor of king of Belgium.

Tristan Bernard took the lead in 1930. He renamed it Théâtre Tristan-Bernard and presented his comedies for a season. After his departure, the theater regained its name Théâtre Albert-Ier.

In 1936, the comedian Charles de Rochefort, on his return from the United States where he worked for Cecil B. de Mille, reopened the theater, which became the Théâtre Charles-de-Rochefort with Allo, Police-secours, a police play under the pseudonym Chas D. Strongstone. The success incited him to present many police and suspense plays. The Young Theater Companies competition was organized every year in May. Mobilized and wounded during the Second World War, he had to hand over the direction to his wife, the actress Mary Grant, a task she would undertake until 1972, with her son Jean Dejoux.

In 1973, Dominique Nohain, the son of animator Jean Nohain, bought the theater and renamed it Théâtre Tristan-Bernard. Edy Saiovici succeeded him in 1986 and directed the venue until his death in 2013 He was replaced by his wife Mireille.

== Repertoire ==
Note : dates in brackets refer to the first performance.

=== Théâtre Albert I (1919-1930) ===
- 1924: Le Cercle de feu
- 1925: Le Magicien prodigieux after Calderon de la Barca, adaptation by Henri Ghéon (3 December)
- 1929: Les Vrais Dieux by Georges de Porto-Riche, directed by Henri Desfontaines (22 November)

=== Théâtre Tristan-Bernard (1930-1932) ===
- 1931: La Crise ministérielle by Tristan Bernard (15 January)
- 1931: Le Sauvage by Tristan Bernard, directed by Henri Burguet (19 February)
- 1931: La Belle Hôtesse by Carlo Goldoni, directed by Georges Pitoëff (14 October)
- 1931: L'Admirable Dalila and Salomon le Sage Tristan Bernard (28 October)
- 1932: Le Doyen des enfants de chœur, comedy in 3 acts by Maxime Léry and Guy d'Abzac (12 November)

=== Théâtre Charles-de-Rochefort ===
==== Direction Charles de Rochefort (1936-1939) ====
- 1936: Allô, Police-secours by Chas D. Strongstone, directed by Charles de Rochefort
- 1937: L'Étrange Croisière by Anne Mariel, directed by Charles Rochefort
- 1938: Frénésie by Charles de Peyret-Chappuis, directed by Charles de Rochefort (3 February)

==== Direction Marie Grant (1939-1972) ====
- 1942: La Tornade by Pierre Maudru, directed by Charles de Rochefort
- 1944: Le Tombeau d'Achille d'André Roussin, directed by the author
- 1944: Antigone by Robert Garnier, adaptation by Thierry Maulnier
- 1945: Horace by Corneille, directed by Noël Vincent (October)
- 1946: Mariana Pineda by Federico Garcia Lorca, adaptation by Marcel Moussy, directed by Sylvain Dhomme (February) April)
- 1946: Mala by Jean Laugier, directed by the author (20 June)
- 1946: Créanciers by August Strindberg, directed by Charles de Rochefort (July)
- 1947: L’Ombre d’un franc-tireur by Seán O'Casey, directed by André Clavé (January)
- 1947: Le Ciel et l’enfer by Prosper Mérimée, directed by André Clavé (January)
- 1952: On ne voit pas les cœurs by André Chamson, directed by Christian-Gérard
- 1952: La Jacquerie by Prosper Mérimée, directed by Clément Harari (13 November)
- 1953: L'Homme au parapluie by William Dinner and William Morum, adaptation by Pol Quentin, directed by Georges Vanderic (5 May)
- 1955: Les Fiancés de la Seine by Morvan Lebesque, directed by René Lafforgue (13 May)
- 1955: Liberty Bar by Frédéric Valmain after Georges Simenon, directed by Jean Dejoux (17 October)
- 1956: Traquenard by Frédéric Valmain after James Hadley Chase, directed by Jean Dejoux
- 1957: Un remède de cheval by Leslie Sands, directed by Jean Dejoux (5 November)
- 1958: La Famille Hernandez by Geneviève Baïlac, directed by the author (12 April)
- 1958: Meurtres en fa dièse by Frédéric Valmain after Boileau-Narcejac, directed by Jean Dejoux (5 December)
- 1959: Homicide par prudence by Frédéric Valmain after Double Cross by John O'Hare, directed by Jean Dejoux
- 1960: Ana d'Eboli by Pierre Ordioni, directed by Pierre Valde (1 October)
- 1960: Sammy by Pol Quentin after Ken Hughes, directed by Jean Dejoux (25 November)
- 1961: Deux pieds dans la tombe de Frédéric Valmain after J. Lee Thompson, directed by Jean Dejoux
- 1962: Illégitime Défense by Frédéric Valmain, directed by Jean Dejoux (10 January)
- 1962: Pas d'usufruit pour tante Caroline by Frédéric Valmain, directed by Jean Dejoux
- 1963: Le Troisième Témoin by Dominique Nohain, directed by the author
- 1964: Le Procès de maître Ferrari by Frédéric Valmain and Jean Rebel, directed by Maurice Guillaud
- 1967: L'Élixir du Révérend Père Gaucher, Le Secret de maître Cornille, Les Trois Messes basses, after Alphonse Daudet, directed by Jean Dejoux (11 March)
- 1968: Le Mystère de River Lodge by Reginald Long, directed by Daniel Crouet
- 1968: Le Verdict by James Cartier, directed by Daniel Crouet

=== Théâtre Tristan-Bernard ===
==== Direction Dominique Nohain (1973-1986) ====
- 1973: Seul le poisson rouge est au courant by Jean Barbier and Dominique Nohain, directed by Dominique Nohain (25 May)
- 1978: Crime à la clef by Alain Bernier and Roger Maridat, directed by Jean-Paul Cisife (23 September)
- 1979: Changement à vue by Loleh Bellon, directed by Yves Bureau (2 February)
- 1979: L'Avocat du diable by Dore Schary, directed by Marcelle Tassencourt (7 September)
- 1979: Comédie pour un meurtre by Jean-Jacques Bricaire and Maurice Lasaygues, directed by Dominique Nohain (27 October)

=== Direction Edy Saiovici (1986-2013) ===
- 1986: Les Aviateurs by Farid Chopel and Ged Marlon, directed by the authors (31 January)
- 1986: Ariane ou l'Âge d'or by Philippe Caubère, directed by the author (7 April)
- 1986: Le Quatuor
- 1986: American Buffalo by David Mamet, directed by Marcel Maréchal (30 September)
- 1987: The Birthday Party by Harold Pinter, directed by Jean-Michel Ribes (2 March)
- 1988: Le Rebelle by Jean-Michel Guenassia, directed by Jean Rougerie (26 January)
- 1988: L'Extra by Jean Larriaga, directed by Jacques Rosny
- 1990: Albert Dupontel
- 1993: Les Acrobates by Tom Stoppard, directed by Jean-François Prévand,
- 1993: Dany Boon Fou ? by Dany Boon and Thierry Joly, directed by Thierry Joly
- 1994: Brèves de comptoir by Jean-Marie Gourio, directed by Jean-Michel Ribes (23 August)
- 1995: Indépendance by Lee Blessing, directed by Béatrice Agenin
- 1995: Que je t'aime - Courrier du cœur by Clémence Massart, directed by Philippe Caubère (December)
- 1996 : Page 27 by Jean-Louis Bauer, directed by Pierre Santini (21 August)
- 1997: André le Magnifique by Isabelle Candelier, Loïc Houdré, Patrick Ligardes, Denis Podalydès, Michel Vuillermoz, directed by the authors (1 September)
- 1999: Momo l'indomptable by Jean-Michel Noirey, directed by the author (29 March)
- 1999: Les Lunettes d'Elton John after David Farr, directed by Stephan Meldegg (23 August)
- 2000: La Framboise frivole by Peter Hens and David Laisné (January)
- 2000: Tu me squattes by Roger Louret, directed by the author (6 May)
- 2000: Commentaire d'amour by Jean-Marie Besset, directed by the author and Gilbert Désveaux (31 August)
- 2001: Une femme de lettres and Un bi-choco sous le sofa by Alan Bennett, directed by Jean-Claude Idée, with Tsilla Chelton
- 2001: Théâtre sans animaux by Jean-Michel Ribes, directed by the author (23 August)
- 2002: Baron by Jean-Marie Besset, directed by the author and Gilbert Désveaux (27 August)
- 2002: Futur conditionnel by Xavier Daugreilh, directed by Nicolas Briançon (15 November)
- 2003: L'amour est enfant de salaud by Alan Ayckbourn, adaptation Michel Blanc, directed by José Paul (2 September)
- 2004: Si j'étais diplômate by Allen Lewis Rickman and Karl Tiedemann, directed by Alain Sachs (26 August)
- 2004: Les Muses orphelines by Michel-Marc Bouchard, directed by Didier Brengarth (19 November)
- 2005: Le Jeu de la vérité by Philippe Lellouche, directed by Marion Sarraut (July)
- 2006: Romance by David Mamet, directed by Pierre Laville (17 January)
- 2006: Les Manuscrits du déluge by Michel-Marc Bouchard, directed by Laurence Renn (31 August)
- 2006: Le Jazz et la Diva by Didier Lockwood, directed by Alain Sachs (3 November)
- 2007: Journalistes by Pierre Notte, directed by Jean-Claude Cotillard (23 January)
- 2007: Le Dindon by Georges Feydeau, directed by Thomas Le Douarec (4 May)
- 2007: Ne nous quitte pas by Gil Galliot and Yves Hirschfeld, directed by the authors (2 October)
- 2007: La Flûte enchantée by Jean-Hervé Appéré, Gil Coudène after Mozart, directed by Jean-Hervé Appéré (20 November)
- 2008: Une souris verte by Douglas Carter Beane, adaptation Jean-Marie Besset, directed by Jean-Luc Revol (22 January)
- 2008: Correspondance inattendue by Sacha Guitry, directed by Jean-Laurent Cochet (27 May)
- 2008: Panique à bord by Stéphane Laporte and Patrick Laviosa, directed by Agnès Boury (14 June)
- 2008: Sans mentir by Xavier Daugreilh, directed by José Paul and Stéphane Cottin (27 August)
- 2009: Le Véritable Inspecteur Whaff by Tom Stoppard, directed by Jean-Luc Revol (21 January)
- 2009: Rapport sur moi by Grégoire Bouillier, directed by Anne Bouvier (4 February)
- 2009: L'Ingénu after Voltaire, directed by Arnaud Denis (8 April)
- 2009: Mission Florimont by Sébastien Azzopardi and Sacha Danino, directed by Sébastien Azzopardi (17 June)
- 2010: L’Illusion conjugale by Éric Assous, directed by Jean-Luc Moreau (15 January)
- 2010: Stand-Up by Gérald Sibleyras, directed by Jean-Luc Moreau (20 August)
- 2010: Le Carton by Clément Michel, directed by Arthur Jugnot and David Roussel (6 November)
- 2011: La Méthode Grönholm by Jordi Galceran, directed by Thierry Lavat (1 February)
- 2011: Les Conjoints by Éric Assous, directed by Jean-Luc Moreau (31 August)
- 2013: L'Entreprise by the Troupe à Palmade, texts by Bilco, Anne-Élisabeth Blateau, Guillaume Clérice, Julien Ratel and Sarah Suco (27 juillet)
