= Laurent Gamelon =

French actor

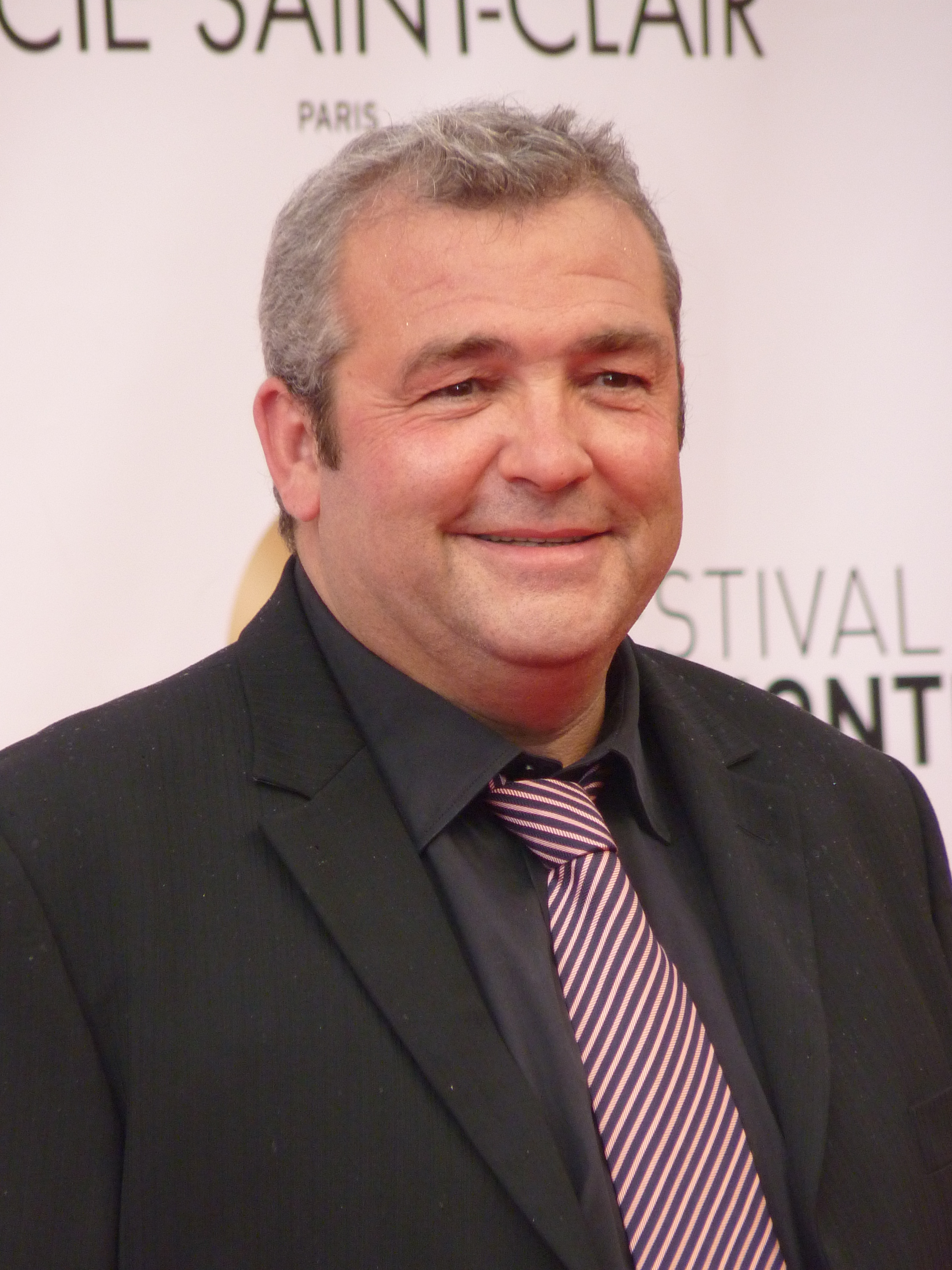
- Laurent Gamelon to the 52nd Monte-Carlo Television Festival
- Born: 19 June 1960 (age 65); Boulogne-Billancourt, France
- Occupation: Actor
- Years active: 1982–present

Laurent Gamelon (born 19 June 1960) is a French actor.

== Filmography ==
Year	Title	Role	Director	Notes
1982-83	Le Petit Théâtre de Bouvard	Various	Nino Monti, Agnès Delarive, ...	TV series
1985	P.R.O.F.S	Gérard Biril	Patrick Schulmann	
1985	S.O.S chômeurs	The cop	Yves Benoît & Jean-Hugues Lime	Short
1987	Les oreilles entre les dents	Max	Patrick Schulmann (2)	
1988	Let Sleeping Cops Lie	The baby's man	José Pinheiro	
1989	Palace	The embezzler	Jean-Michel Ribes	TV series (1 episode)
1989	Les pique-assiettes	Jacques	Gilles Amado, Marianne Fossorier, ...	TV series (5 episodes); Also writer
1991	Triplex	Mario	Georges Lautner	
1991	The Professional Secrets of Dr. Apfelgluck	Maurice	Alessandro Capone, Thierry Lhermitte, ...	
1991	Merci la vie	Brother-in-law	Bertrand Blier	
1991	Une époque formidable...	The muscular guy	Gérard Jugnot	
1991	On peut toujours rêver	A biker	Pierre Richard	
1992	La Crise	Didier	Coline Serreau	
1992	Vieille canaille	The inspector	Gérard Jourd'hui	
1992	Chien et chat	Feutrelle	Philippe Galland	TV series (1 episode)
1993	Louis, the Child King	Descouches	Roger Planchon	
1993	Tango	Taxi driver	Patrice Leconte	
1993	Chacun pour toi	René	Jean-Michel Ribes (2)	
1993	La cavale des fous	Fredo	Marco Pico	
1994	Vivre son patrimoine	The man	Hannelore Cayre	Short
1994	Placé en garde à vue	Leturc	Marco Pauly	TV series (1 episode)
1996	XY, drôle de conception	The spermogramme	Jean-Paul Lilienfeld	
1996	Berjac	Louis	Jean-Michel Ribes (3)	TV movie
1997	Le mensonge		Laurent Carcélès	TV movie
1998	The Lion King II: Simba's Pride	Mufasa	Darrell Rooney & Rob LaDuca	French version
1998	Nestor Burma	Maurice	Jean Marboeuf	TV series (1 episode)
1999	Au bénéfice du doute	Charavin	Williams Crépin	TV mini-series
2000	Actors	Taxi driver	Bertrand Blier (2)	
2000	Toy Story 2	Evil Emperor Zurg	John Lasseter	French version
2000	Victoire, ou la douleur des femmes	The planning man	Nadine Trintignant	TV mini-series
2000	Le juge est une femme	Bruno	Pierre Boutron	TV series (1 episode)
2001	The Closet	Alba	Francis Veber	
2003	Ruby & Quentin	Mauricet	Francis Veber (2)	
2003	Le pharmacien de garde	Maurice Battistoni	Jean Veber	
2003	Allez la Saussouze !	Lolo	Eric Fourniols & Vincent Manniez	TV series (1 episode)
2003-09	Diane, femme flic	Serge Carro	Jean-Marc Seban, Marc Angelo, ...	TV series (21 episodes)
2004	Intimate Strangers	Luc	Patrice Leconte (2)	
2004	À trois c'est mieux	André	Laurence Katrian	TV movie
2004	Louis la brocante	Portos	Bruno Gantillon	TV series (1 episode)
2005	Le bal des célibataires	Séraphin	Jean-Louis Lorenzi	TV movie
2005	L'homme qui voulait passer à la télé		Amar Arhab & Fabrice Michelin	TV movie
2005	Les enquêtes d'Éloïse Rome	Max Valmy	Christophe Douchand	TV series (1 episode)
2006	La Maison du Bonheur	Donatello Pirelli	Dany Boon	
2006	The Valet	Paul	Francis Veber (3)	
2006	Au secours, les enfants reviennent !	Étienne Ducatteau	Thierry Binisti	TV movie
2006	Kaamelott	The cheater	Alexandre Astier	TV series (1 episode)
2007	L'Auberge rouge	The woodcutter	Gérard Krawczyk	
2008	Beauties at War	Gaby	Patrice Leconte (3)	
2008	A Day at the Museum	Lionel	Jean-Michel Ribes (4)	
2008	Mia and the Migoo	Jekhilde	Jacques-Rémy Girerd	
2008	Ça se soigne ?	Éric	Laurent Chouchan	
2008	The Maiden and the Wolves	The blacksmith	Gilles Legrand	
2008	Marie-Octobre	Guillaume Ferronnier	Josée Dayan	TV movie
2008	Joséphine, ange gardien	The Duke of Arcamboise	Philippe Monnier	TV series (1 episode)
2009	Erreur de la banque en votre faveur	Georges	Gérard Bitton & Michel Munz	
2009	J'oublie et puis j'y pense	Him	Philippe Courtin	Short
2010	Nothing to Declare	Duval	Dany Boon (2)	
2010	Imogène McCarthery	Imogène's father	Alexandre Charlot & Franck Magnier	
2010	À 10 minutes de la plage	Charles Lemoulec	Stéphane Kappes	TV movie
2010	Louis la brocante	Camille	Véronique Langlois	TV series (1 episode)
2011	Le bon samaritain	Jean-Jacques René / Antoine Toussaint	Bruno Garcia	TV movie
2011	Ripoux anonymes	Antoine Minda	Claude Zidi	TV series (1 episode)
2011-13	Une famille formidable	François Fabiani	Joël Santoni & Alexandre Pidoux	TV series (3 episodes)
2012	La chanson du dimanche		Alexandre Castagnetti	TV series (1 episode)
2012-14	Clem	Jean-Paul Boissier	Joyce Buñuel & Éric Le Roux	TV series (11 episodes)
2014	Brèves de comptoir	Rubens	Jean-Michel Ribes (5)	

== Theater ==
Year	Title	Author	Director	Notes
1987	Les Pieds dans l'eau	Michel Lengliney	Éric Civanyan	Théâtre de la Madeleine
1990	Popkins	Murray Schisgal	Danièle Chutaux	Théâtre des Célestins
1991	Le Crépuscule des lâches	Jacques Delaporte & Martin Lamotte	Martin Lamotte	Théâtre de la Porte Saint-Martin
1993	Silence en coulisses !	Michael Frayn	Jean-Luc Moreau	Théâtre du Palais-Royal
1994-96	Brèves de comptoir	Jean-Marie Gourio	Jean-Michel Ribes	Théâtre Tristan-Bernard
1996-97	A Flea in Her Ear	Georges Feydeau	Bernard Murat	Théâtre des Variétés
1998	Demons	Fyodor Dostoyevsky	Roger Planchon	Opéra-Comique
1999-2001	Les Nouvelles Brèves de comptoir	Jean-Marie Gourio	Jean-Michel Ribes (2)	Théâtre Fontaine
2003	Remue-Ménage	Alan Ayckbourn	Pierre Mondy	Théâtre des Variétés
2007	Le Dîner de Cons	Francis Veber	Francis Veber	Théâtre de la Porte Saint-Martin
2008	Tailleur pour dames	Georges Feydeau	Bernard Murat (2)	Théâtre Édouard VII
2009	Twelve Angry Men	Reginald Rose	Stephan Meldegg	Théâtre de Paris
2010-11	Les Nouvelles Brèves de comptoir	Jean-Marie Gourio	Jean-Michel Ribes (3)	Théâtre du Rond-Point
2012	Le Dindon	Georges Feydeau	Bernard Murat (3)	Théâtre Édouard VII
2014-15	The Closet	Francis Veber	Francis Veber (2)	Théâtre des Nouveautés
2016	Hier est un autre jour !	Sylvain Meyniac & Jean-François Cros	Éric Civanyan (2)	Le Palace
2016	L'Invité	David Pharao	Jean-Luc Moreau (2)	Théâtre Montparnasse
2016	Mariage et châtiment	David Pharao	Jean-Luc Moreau (3)	Théâtre Hébertot
2017	Tant qu'il y a de l'amour	Bob Martet	Anne Bourgeois	Théâtre de la Michodière
