= Annie Grégorio =

French film and theatrical actress (born 1957)

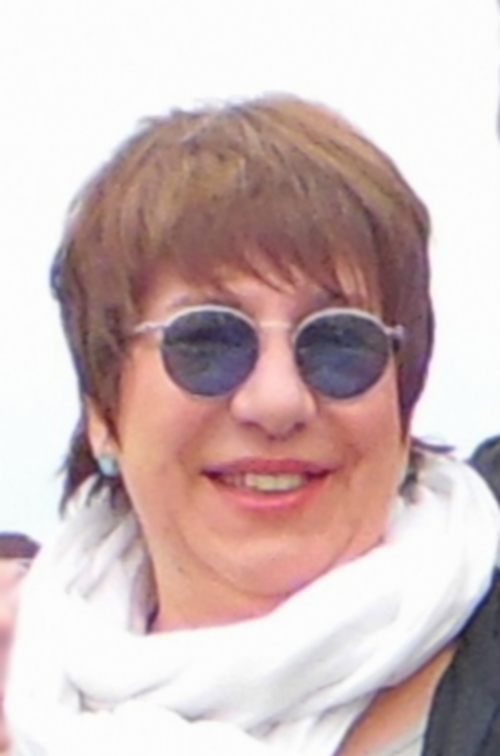
- Born: 4 April 1957 (age 68); Nérac, France
- Occupation: Actress
- Years active: 1985–present

Annie Grégorio (born 4 April 1957) is a French film and theatrical actress.

== Theater ==
Year	Title	Author	Director	Notes
1990	Coiffure pour dames	Robert Harling	Stéphane Hillel	Nominated - Molière Award for Best Supporting Actress
1993	Une folie	Sacha Guitry	Jacques Échantillon	Nominated - Molière Award for Best Supporting Actress
1994	The Odd Couple	Neil Simon	Bernard Murat	
1996-97	A Flea in Her Ear	Georges Feydeau	Bernard Murat (2)	
2001	Théâtre sans animaux	Jean-Michel Ribes	Jean-Michel Ribes	Molière Award for Best Supporting Actress
2003	Remue-Ménage	Alan Ayckbourn	Pierre Mondy	
2004	Musée haut, musée bas	Jean-Michel Ribes	Jean-Michel Ribes (2)	Nominated - Molière Award for Best Supporting Actress
2009	Les Diablogues	Roland Dubillard	Jean-Michel Ribes (3)	
2010-11	Les Nouvelles Brèves de comptoir	Jean-Marie Gourio	Jean-Michel Ribes (4)	
2013	Théâtre sans animaux	Jean-Michel Ribes	Jean-Michel Ribes	
2014	Barthélémy	Roman Girelli	Régis de Martrin-Donos	

== Filmography ==
Year	Title	Role	Director	Notes
1985	Slices of Life	The journalist	François Leterrier	
1985	Le ravi		Maurice Failevic	TV movie
1986	Cours privé		Pierre Granier-Deferre	
1986	Manège		Jacques Nolot	Short
1987	Bonne chance monsieur Pic !	The posticheuse	Maurice Failevic (2)	TV movie
1988	Les enquêtes du commissaire Maigret	The restaurant's owner	Youri	TV series (1 episode)
1989	Périgord noir	Marguerite	Nicolas Ribowski	
1990	L'alligator		Laurent Bouhnik	Short
1992	Le zèbre	Marie-Louise	Jean Poiret	
1992	Vincennes Neuilly	Marthe	Pierre Dupouey	
1992	Les années F.M.	Maia	Emmanuelle Dubergey	TV series (1 episode)
1993	Les ténors	The baby-sitter	Francis de Gueltzl	
1994	Maigret	The nanny	Joyce Buñuel	TV series (1 episode)
1996	Désiré	Adèle	Bernard Murat	
1996	Fantôme avec chauffeur	The maid	Gérard Oury	
1996	Les aveux de l'innocent	The divisional commissioner	Jean-Pierre Améris	
1996	Fallait pas !	Constance's friend	Gérard Jugnot	
1996	L'orange de Noël	Jeanne	Jean-Louis Lorenzi	TV movie
1996	L'allée du roi	The Queen	Nina Companeez	TV mini-series
1997	Les Soeurs Soleil		Jeannot Szwarc	
1997	Un printemps de chien	Graziella	Alain Tasma	TV movie
1997	Un petit grain de folie		Sébastien Grall	TV movie
1997-2002	Un homme en colère	Mitzi Goldberg	Dominique Tabuteau, Didier Albert, ...	TV series (13 episodes)
1998	La voie est libre	Mathilde	Stéphane Clavier	
1998	Combats de femme	Marianne	Jean-Pierre Améris (2)	TV series (1 episode)
1999	Le schpountz	Aunt Clarisse	Gérard Oury (2)	
1999	Un pur moment de rock'n roll	The nurse	Manuel Boursinhac	
1999	À vot' service	The pumpwoman	Laurence Katrian	
1999	Tramontane	Madame Thuir	Henri Helman	TV mini-series
1999	Chère Marianne	Mademoiselle Minondo	Pierre Joassin	TV series (1 episode)
2000	Mary Lester	The psychologist	Christiane Lehérissey	TV series (1 episode)
2001	C'est la vie	Simone	Jean-Pierre Améris (3)	
2001	Le coeur sur la main	Feng shui	Marie-Anne Chazel	Short
2001	Rastignac ou les ambitieux	Zoé	Alain Tasma (2)	TV mini-series
2001	Joséphine, ange gardien	Madame Berthier	Dominique Baron	TV series (1 episode)
2003	Bienvenue au gîte	Angélique	Claude Duty	
2003	Ambre a disparu	Annie	Denys Granier-Deferre	TV movie
2004	Au secours, j'ai 30 ans !	Mademoiselle Deleu	Marie-Anne Chazel (2)	
2004	Victoire	Monique	Stéphanie Murat	
2004	Tout l'univers	Madame Da Silva	Fabrice Benchaouche	Short
2004	Maigret	Mademoiselle Clément	Laurent Heynemann	TV series (1 episode)
2005	L'Antidote	Andrée	Vincent De Brus	
2005	Inséparables		Élisabeth Rappeneau	TV series (1 episode)
2005-08	Merci, les enfants vont bien !	Babette	Stéphane Clavier (2)	TV series (11 episodes)
2006	Comme un air		Yohann Gloaguen	Short
2006	Marie Besnard l'empoisonneuse...	Louise Pinson	Christian Faure	TV movie
2006	Monsieur Léon	Odette	Pierre Boutron	TV movie
2006	Joséphine, ange gardien	Martine Teyssier	Philippe Monnier	TV series (1 episode)
2006-15	Commissaire Laviolette	Solange	Bruno Gantillon, Philomène Esposito, ...	TV series (7 episodes)
2007	A Secret	Léone	Claude Miller	
2007	La forastera	Simone	José Pinheiro	TV movie
2007	Les diablesses	Sister Blandine	Harry Cleven	TV movie
2007	La prophétie d'Avignon	Commissioner Renard	David Delrieux	TV mini-series
2008	A Day at the Museum	Fernande	Jean-Michel Ribes	
2008	Modern Love	The Spanish teacher	Stéphane Kazandjian	
2008	De feu et de glace	Viviane	Joyce Buñuel (2)	TV movie
2008	Adrien	Odile	Pascale Bailly	TV movie
2009	Mourir d'aimer	Marie Guilbert	Josée Dayan	TV movie
2009	Folie douce	The nurse	Josée Dayan (2)	TV movie
2010	Turk's Head	The nurse	Pascal Elbé	
2010	Au siècle de Maupassant	Rose	Gérard Jourd'hui	TV series (1 episode)
2010-12	Clem	Mademoiselle Lecoutre	Joyce Buñuel (3)	TV series (6 episodes)
2011	Ripoux anonymes	Berthier	Claude Zidi	TV series (1 episode)
2011	Chez Maupassant	Henriette	Gérard Jourd'hui (2)	TV series (1 episode)
2011-12	Week-end chez les Toquées	Lili	Emmanuel Jeaugey, Laurence Katrian (2), ...	TV series (5 episodes)
2014	Brèves de comptoir	The postwoman	Jean-Michel Ribes (2)	
2014	Un village presque parfait	Clothilde	Stéphane Meunier	
2014	Scènes de ménages	José's sister	Francis Duquet	TV series (1 episode)
2014	Crimes et botanique	Marjolaine Blanquefort	Lorenzo Gabriele & Bruno Garcia	TV series (4 episodes)
2015	On se retrouvera	Nanou	Joyce Buñuel (4)	TV movie
2016	The Visitors: Bastille Day	Honorine	Jean-Marie Poiré	
2016	Trainee Day	Simone	Marc Fitoussi	
2017	Murders at Grasse	Marie Dusseyre	Karim Ouaret	TV movie
2023	Disparition inquiétante: Retour aux sources	Armelle Minghetti	Stéphanie Pillonca	TV movie
