= Fabienne Chaudat =

French film and theatrical actress

- Born: 1 July 1959 (age 66); Pierre-de-Bresse, Saône-et-Loire, France
- Occupation: Actress
- Years active: 1985–present

Fabienne Chaudat (born 1 July 1959) is a French film and theatrical actress.

== Career ==
Fabienne Chaudat attended the and then Jean-Laurent Cochet's classes, before starting her career.

== Theater ==
Year	Title	Author	Director	Notes
1985	Doit-on le dire ?	Eugène Labiche	Jean-Laurent Cochet	
1986	Treasure Island	Robert Louis Stevenson	Michel Valmer	
1987	A Flea in Her Ear	Georges Feydeau	Jacqueline Boeuf & Alain Terrat	
1990	La Dame de chez Maxim	Georges Feydeau	Bernard Murat	
1992	Les brigands	Jacques Offenbach	Jérôme Deschamps	
1993	Les pieds dans l'eau	Jérôme Deschamps	Jérôme Deschamps	
1994	On purge bébé	Georges Feydeau	Bernard Murat	
1997-1998	Cyrano de Bergerac	Edmond Rostand	Pino Micol	
2001	Le nouveau Testament	Sacha Guitry	Bernard Murat	
2002	Right You Are (if you think so)	Luigi Pirandello	Bernard Murat	
2003	Le nouveau Testament	Sacha Guitry	Bernard Murat	
2004	Déviation obligatoire	Philippe Chevallier & Régis Laspalès	Philippe Chevallier & Régis Laspalès	
2006	Lune de miel	Noël Coward	Bernard Murat	
2007	Victor ou les enfants au pouvoir	Roger Vitrac	Alain Sachs	
2008	Clérambard	Marcel Aymé	Nicolas Briançon	
2008	Tailleur pour dames	Georges Feydeau	Bernard Murat	
2008	La valse des pinguins	Patrick Haudecœur	Jacques Décombe	
2010	Au nom du fils	Alain Cauchi	Étienne Bierry	
2010-2011	Colombe	Jean Anouilh	Michel Fagadau	Nominated - Molière Award for Best Supporting Actress
2012	Le Dindon	Georges Feydeau	Bernard Murat	
2013	The Madwoman of Chaillot	Jean Giraudoux	Didier Long	
2014	Le Bouffon du Président	Olivier Lejeune	Olivier Lejeune	
2015	Et pendant ce temps Simone veille !	Trinidad	Gil Galliot	
2017	Silence, on tourne !	Patrick Haudecoeur	Patrick Haudecoeur	

== Filmography ==
Year	Title	Role	Director	Notes
1986	Vaudeville	Dame valse	Jean Marboeuf	
1987	Surcharge	The woman	Christophe Jacrot	Short
1987	Comme tu veux mon chéri	Suzanne	Philippe Galardi	TV mini-series
1988	Story of Women	The patient	Claude Chabrol	
1988	La petite amie	The saleswoman	Luc Béraud	
1988	Corentin, ou Les infortunes conjugales	Elisabeth-Germaine	Jean Marboeuf	
1988	Les Cinq Dernières Minutes		Louis Grospierre	TV series (1 episode)
1989	Mama, There's a Man in Your Bed	Madame Salgado	Coline Serreau	
1989	Divine enfant		Jean-Pierre Mocky	
1989	Bille en tête	The bridge player	Carlo Cotti	
1989	Things I Like, Things I Don't Like (Foutaises)		Jean-Pierre Jeunet	Short
1990	If the Shoe Fits	Receptionist	Tom Clegg	TV movie
1990	Haute tension		Joyce Buñuel	TV series (1 episode)
1991	La Totale!	The accountant	Claude Zidi	
1991	Les dessous de la passion	Sonia	Jean Marboeuf	TV movie
1991	La florentine		Marion Sarraut	TV mini-series
1993	Hélas pour moi		Jean-Luc Godard	
1993	Pétain	Bella	Jean Marboeuf	
1993	Le tronc	The nun	Bernard Faroux & Karl Zéro	
1993-2002	Les Deschiens	Various	Jérôme Deschamps & Macha Makeïeff	TV series
1994	Revenge of the Musketeers	Sister Frédégonde	Bertrand Tavernier	
1994	La Vengeance d'une blonde	The servant	Jeannot Szwarc	
1995	Les Anges gardiens		Jean-Marie Poiré	
1995	Le roi de Paris	Angèle	Dominique Maillet	
1996	Temps de chien	Pétronille Dubreuil	Jean Marboeuf	
1996	L'allée du roi		Nina Companeez	TV mini-series
1996	Les Cinq Dernières Minutes	Marie	Jean Marboeuf	TV series (1 episode)
1997	Tenue correcte exigée	Rose Duchemin	Philippe Lioret	
1999	Le derrière	Josy	Valérie Lemercier	
2001	Amélie	The woman in a coma	Jean-Pierre Jeunet	
2001	Ce qui compte pour Mathilde	The florist	Stéphanie Murat	Short
2002	Les enquêtes d'Éloïse Rome	Nicole	Edwin Baily	TV series (1 episode)
2004	Madame Édouard	Mimi	Nadine Monfils	
2004	Malabar Princess	Odette	Gilles Legrand	
2004	Louis Page		Jean-Daniel Verhaeghe	TV series (1 episode)
2005	How Much Do You Love Me?	François's colleague	Bertrand Blier	
2005	Poids plume		Nolwenn Lemesle	Short
2006	My Best Friend	Épouse Lebinet	Patrice Leconte	
2007	The Merry Widow	The neighbor	Isabelle Mergault	
2007	Le clan Pasquier	The baker	Jean-Daniel Verhaeghe	TV mini-series
2008	The Maiden and the Wolves	The postwoman	Gilles Legrand	
2008	Voici venir l'orage...		Nina Companeez	TV mini-series
2010	Notre Dame des Barjots	Bibou	Arnaud Sélignac	TV movie
2010	Fais danser la poussière		Christian Faure	TV movie
2010	Les Bougon	Valérie	Michel Hassan	TV series (1 episode)
2010	Au siècle de Maupassant	The merchant	Jacques Santamaria	TV series (1 episode)
2011	Le Paradis sur terre		Emmanuel Murat	TV movie
2013	Serial Teachers	The academy secretary	Pierre-François Martin-Laval	
2013	3 Femmes en colère	Sébastien's mother	Christian Faure	TV movie
2014	Yves Saint Laurent	Dame Dior	Jalil Lespert	
2014	La séance	Juliette	Edouard de La Poëze	Short
2018	Qu'est ce qu'on attend pour être heureux ?	Madame Trogneux	Anne Giafferi	TV series (1 episode)
