= Chantal Neuwirth =

French actress (born 1948)

- Born: 11 December 1948 (age 76); Paris, France
- Occupation: Actress
- Years active: 1973–present

Chantal Neuwirth (born 1948) is a French actress, who also played on theatre.

She's been nominated three times to the Molière Awards : in 1999 for Rêver peut-être, in 2000 for Les Nouvelles Brèves de comptoir and in 2004 for Portrait de famille.

== Theater ==
Year	Title	Author	Director
1973	Mathusalem	Yvan Goll	Anne-Marie Lazarini
1975	Othello	William Shakespeare	Christian Dente
1980	La Périchole	Jacques Offenbach	Jacques Livchine & Michel Valmer
1982	L'Éléphant d'or	Alexandre Kopkov	Bernard Sobel
1984	On déménage	Georges Feydeau	Jacques Nichet & Didier Bezace
1984	Intruder	Maurice Maeterlinck	Jacques Nichet & Didier Bezace
1986-87	Les Crachats de la lune	Gildas Bourdet	Gildas Bourdet
1987	Tonight We Improvise	Luigi Pirandello	Lucian Pintilie
1988	Il faut passer par les nuages	François Billetdoux	Lucian Pintilie
1990-91	La Veuve	Pierre Corneille	Christian Rist
1991	Le Haut-de-forme	Eduardo De Filippo	Jacques Nichet
1992	Derrière les collines	Jean-Louis Bourdon	Jean-Louis Bourdon
1993	Faust	Johann Wolfgang von Goethe	Dominique Pitoiset
1994-96	Brèves de comptoir	Jean-Marie Gourio	Jean-Michel Ribes
1997	Derrière les collines	Jean-Louis Bourdon	Jean-Louis Bourdon
1998	La Cagnotte	Eugène Marin Labiche	Jacques Lassalle
1998-99	Rêver peut-être	Jean-Claude Grumberg	Jean-Michel Ribes
1999-2000	Les Nouvelles Brèves de comptoir	Jean-Marie Gourio	Jean-Michel Ribes
2002	L'Enfant do	Jean-Claude Grumberg	Jean-Michel Ribes
2003	Portrait de famille	Denise Bonal	Marion Bierry
2006	Soirée de gala	Roger Planchon	Roger Planchon
2007-08	Un Chapeau de Paille d'Italie	Eugène Marin Labiche	Jean-Baptiste Sastre
2009	Chat en poche	Georges Feydeau	Christophe Barratier
2010-11	Les Nouvelles Brèves de comptoir	Jean-Marie Gourio	Jean-Michel Ribes
2012	Tartuffe	Molière	Marion Bierry
2015	Ivanov	Anton Chekhov	Luc Bondy
2016	Tartuffe	Molière	Luc Bondy
2017	Honneur à notre élue	Marie NDiaye	Frédéric Bélier-Garcia

== Filmography ==
=== Cinema ===
Year	Title	Role	Director	Notes
1980	Rendez-moi ma peau...	Zora	Patrick Schulmann	
1981	Men Prefer Fat Girls	A visitor	Jean-Marie Poiré	
1984	Aldo et Junior	Malvira	Patrick Schulmann	
1985	Profs	Flora Taulier	Patrick Schulmann	
1985	Le pactole	Anne's colleague	Jean-Pierre Mocky	
1985	Le voyage à Paimpol	Lili	John Berry	
1986	Rue du Départ	Wilhelmine	Tony Gatlif	
1987	Les oreilles entre les dents	The parking's woman	Patrick Schulmann	
1988	The Little Thief	The farmer	Claude Miller	
1990	Un ascenseur pour l'an neuf		Gildas Bourdet & Pascal Goethals	Short
1991	The Double Life of Véronique	The receptionist	Krzysztof Kieślowski	
1996	Une trop bruyante solitude	Waitress	Véra Caïs	
1997	Alors voilà	The butcher	Michel Piccoli	
1997	Violetta la reine de la moto	Yolande	Guy Jacques	
1998	Madeline	Helene	Daisy von Scherler Mayer	
1998	Those Who Love Me Can Take the Train	Geneviève	Patrice Chéreau	
2000	Nationale 7	Sandrine	Jean-Pierre Sinapi	
2000	André le magnifique	Néné	Emmanuel Silvestre & Thibault Staib	
2000	La voleuse de Saint-Lubin	The social worker	Claire Devers	
2003	The Cost of Living	Granny	Philippe Le Guay	
2004	Ne quittez pas !	The plane's passenger	Arthur Joffé	
2004	A Very Long Engagement	Bénédicte	Jean-Pierre Jeunet	
2005	Gabrielle	Madeleine	Patrice Chéreau	
2005	Espace détente	Annie Lepoutre	Yvan Le Bolloc'h & Bruno Solo	
2005	Comme James Dean	Marthe Benchetrout	Jonathan Zaccaï	Short
2007	Les ambitieux	Marceline Fouek	Catherine Corsini	
2008	Sagan	Madame Lebreton	Diane Kurys	
2008	Cortex	Francine	Nicolas Boukhrief	
2008	Bouquet final	Evelyne	Michel Delgado	
2008	A Day at the Museum	Anne	Jean-Michel Ribes	
2008	The Beautiful Person	Nicole	Christophe Honoré	
2009	S.A.R.L. Noël		Anita & John Hudson	Short
2009	Looking for Steven Spielberg	The baker	Benjamin Guillard	Short
2011	Holidays by the Sea	The widow	Pascal Rabaté	
2012	The Dream Team	Nénène	Olivier Dahan	
2012	The Day of the Crows	The old Bramble	Jean-Christophe Dessaint	
2012	Dépression et des potes	Madame Vauthier	Arnaud Lemort	
2014	Brèves de comptoir	The café owner	Jean-Michel Ribes	
2016	Deux escargots s'en vont		Jean-Pierre Jeunet & Romain Segaud	Short
2021	Si on chantait	Henriette	Fabrice Maruca	
2022	Kitchen Brigade	Sabine	Louis-Julien Petit	

=== Television ===
Year	Title	Role	Director	Notes
1982	Bonbons en gros	Chantal Dupré	François Dupont-Midi	TV movie
1984	Lace	Woman on Paris Street	William Hale	TV mini-series
1985	Bachou		Alain Dhouailly	TV movie
1986	Jours de sable	Christiane	Youri	TV movie
1990	Sniper	Café's owner	Klaus Biedermann	TV movie
1990	Chillers	The innkeeper's wife	John Berry	TV series (1 episode)
1991	Auf der Suche nach Salome	The baker	Jean-Pierre Heizmann & Wolfgang Panzer	TV series (2 episodes)
1995	Dancing nuage	Christiane	Irène Jouannet	TV movie
1995	Le serment d'Hippocrate		Jean-Louis Bertucelli	TV movie
2001	Avocats & associés	Christiane Soubise	Philippe Triboit & Alexandre Pidoux	TV series (2 episodes)
2001-04	Caméra café	Annie Lepoutre	Francis Duquet, Karine Giraud, ...	TV series (708 episodes)
2002	Le voyage organisé	Mimi	Alain Nahum	TV movie
2003	Un fils de notre temps	The nurse	Fabrice Cazeneuve	TV movie
2005	Enceinte	The RER's woman	Fabienne Roumet	TV short
2005	Le triporteur de Belleville	Anita Rodriguez	Stéphane Kurc	TV movie
2009	La maîtresse du président	Madame Japy	Jean-Pierre Sinapi	TV movie
2010	Au siècle de Maupassant	Honorine	Philippe Bérenger	TV series (1 episode)
2013	Y'a pas d'âge	Madame Carpeaux	Stéphane Marelli & Vincent Puybaret	TV series (3 episodes)
2018	Patrick Melrose	Yvette	Edward Berger	TV mini-series
2021	Carrément craignos	Tito's mother	Jean-Pascal Zadi	TV mini-series
2022	Caméra Café, 20 ans déjà	Annie Lepoutre	Yvan Le Bolloc'h & Bruno Solo	TV movie
2022	En famille	Évelyne	Christophe Douchand	TV series (1 episode)
2023	Clemenceau, la force d'aimer	Clotilde	Lorraine Lévy	TV movie
2023	Alphonse	Francoise Berleau	Nicolas Bedos	TV series (6 episodes)

== Awards and nominations ==
Year	Award	Nominated work	Result
1999	Molière Award for Best Supporting Actress	Rêver peut-être	Nominated
2000	Molière Award for Best Supporting Actress	Les Nouvelles Brèves de comptoir	Nominated
2004	Molière Award for Best Actress	Portrait de famille	Nominated
