= Régis Laspalès =

French comedian and actor (born 1957)

Régis Laspalès in 2004
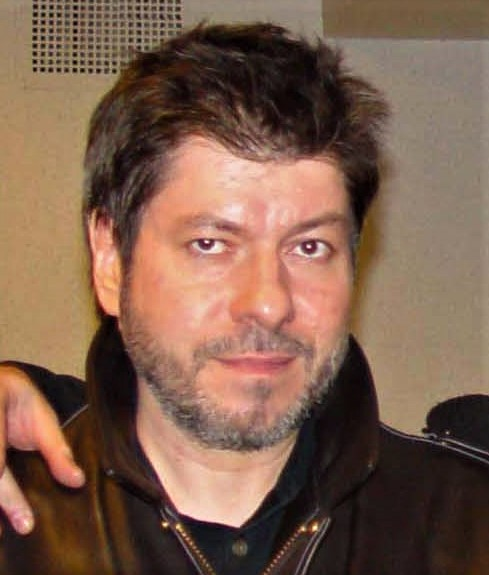
- Born: 25 February 1957 (age 69); Paris, France
- Occupations: Comedian and actor
- Years active: 1981–present

Régis Laspalès (born 25 February 1957 in Paris) is a French comedian and actor best known for his collaboration with Philippe Chevallier.

== Career ==
He studied at the École des Beaux-Arts in Paris, from which he graduated in plastic arts, in sculpture section. Then, he enrolled in Cours Simon, to follow what was for him, his true vocation: becoming an actor.

In 1981, Chevallier and Laspalès created their first show: No fantasy in orangeade. They were then spotted by Philippe Bouvard and made their television debut in 1982 in the Théâtre de Bouvard on Antenne 2.

He is known for his particular phrasing and is imitated by many performers.

== Personal life ==
Régis Laspalès lives mainly in Paris, near Montparnasse. He also have a house in Premeaux-Prissey, where his family is from. He has vineyards there and produces his own wine.

== Theater ==
Year	Title	Writer	Director
1981-82	Pas de fantaisie dans l'orangeade	Chevallier & Laspalès	Chevallier & Laspalès
1984	Double foyer	Philippe Bouvard	Jean-Claude Islert
1987-89	Bien dégagé autour des oreilles	Chevallier & Laspalès	Chevallier & Laspalès
1990-91	Chevallier Laspalès au théâtre des nouveautés	Chevallier & Laspalès	Jacques Décombe
1992-94	C'est vous qui voyez !	Chevallier & Laspalès	Seymour Brussel
1996	Chevallier et Laspalès vont au Déjazet	Chevallier & Laspalès	Chevallier & Laspalès
1997-2000	Ma femme s'appelle Maurice	Raffy Shart	Jean-Luc Moreau
2001-02	Monsieur chasse !	Georges Feydeau	Jean-Luc Moreau
2003-04	Déviation obligatoire	Chevallier & Laspalès	Chevallier & Laspalès
2005-06	Landru	Laurent Ruquier	Jean-Luc Tardieu
2006-07	La rentrée des sketches	Chevallier & Laspalès	Chevallier & Laspalès
2008	Le Banc	Gérald Sibleyras	Christophe Lidon
2009-11	Le Dîner de cons	Francis Veber	Jean-Luc Moreau
2012-13	Les Menteurs	Anthony Neilson	Jean-Luc Moreau
2014-15	Vous reprendrez bien quelques sketches ?	Chevallier & Laspalès	Chevallier & Laspalès
2016-18	A droite, à gauche	Laurent Ruquier	Steve Suissa
2018	Fric-Frac	Édouard Bourdet	Michel Fau
2019	Le plus beau dans tout ça	Laurent Ruquier	Steve Suissa
2021-22	La Famille et le Potager	Bob Martet	Anne Bourgeois
2023	Trap for a Lonely Man	Robert Thomas	Michel Fau

== Filmography ==
Year	Title	Role	Director	Notes
1982-87	Le Théâtre de Bouvard	Various	Nino Monti, Michèle Lucker, ...	TV show
1984	Le joli coeur	The baker	Francis Perrin	
1986	Gros dégueulasse	The agent	Bruno Zincone	
1986	Le bonheur a encore frappé	The customer in cinema	Jean-Luc Trotignon	
1986	La bête noire	The professor	Yves Benoît & Jean-Hugues Lime	Short
1986	Bing		Nino Monti	TV movie
1988	J'aime rien		Henri-Paul Korchia	Short
1988	M'as-tu-vu?	The client with a beard	Éric Le Hung	TV series (1 episode)
1994	Tête à tête	Prosper	Yves Benoît & Jean-Hugues Lime	
1997	The Bet	Gilbert	Didier Bourdon & Bernard Campan	
1997	Tout doit disparaître	The hypnotist	Philippe Muyl	
1998	Ça n'empêche pas les sentiments	Raoul	Jean-Pierre Jackson	Also writer
2000	Antilles sur Seine	Man at café	Pascal Légitimus	
2002	Ma femme s'appelle Maurice	Maurice Lappin	Jean-Marie Poiré	
2003	Les gaous	Michel	Igor Sekulic	
2003	The Car Keys	Himself	Laurent Baffie	
2005	Tu vas rire, mais je te quitte	Himself	Philippe Harel	
2006	Incontrôlable	The priest	Raffy Shart	
2008	Chez Maupassant	Joseph Mouradour	Gérard Jourd'hui	TV series (1 episode)
2008	Myster Mocky présente	Julien	Jean-Pierre Mocky	TV series (1 episode)
2009	Au siècle de Maupassant	M. Guillaume	Jean-Daniel Verhaeghe	TV series (1 episode)
2010	My Afternoons with Margueritte	M. Bayle	Jean Becker	
2010	Les méchantes	Corcellet	Philippe Monnier	TV movie
2011	Les affaires sont les affaires	Isidore Lechat	Philippe Bérenger	TV movie
2013	La grande peinture	Dédé Settemer	Laurent Heynemann	TV movie Also writer
2013	Myster Mocky présente	Spring	Jean-Pierre Mocky	TV series (1 episode)
2014	Brèves de comptoir	Mussel	Jean-Michel Ribes	
2017	Dans la tête	The man	Sébastien Betbeder	Music video
2020	I Love You Coiffure	Monsieur Martin	Muriel Robin	TV movie
2021	Super-héros malgré lui	Jean-Pierre	Philippe Lacheau	
2021	Le Grand Restaurant 3	Minister of Culture	Romuald Boulanger & Pierre Palmade	TV movie
2023	Un petit miracle	Michel	Sophie Boudre	
2023	The Crime Is Mine	Inspector Brun	François Ozon	
