= Un aller simple =

Un aller simple (One Way Ticket) may refer to:

- Un aller simple (film)
- One-Way, a French novel with the original title Un aller simple
  - Un aller simple (2001 film), an adaptation of the novel
