= Urbain Cancelier =

French comedian and actor

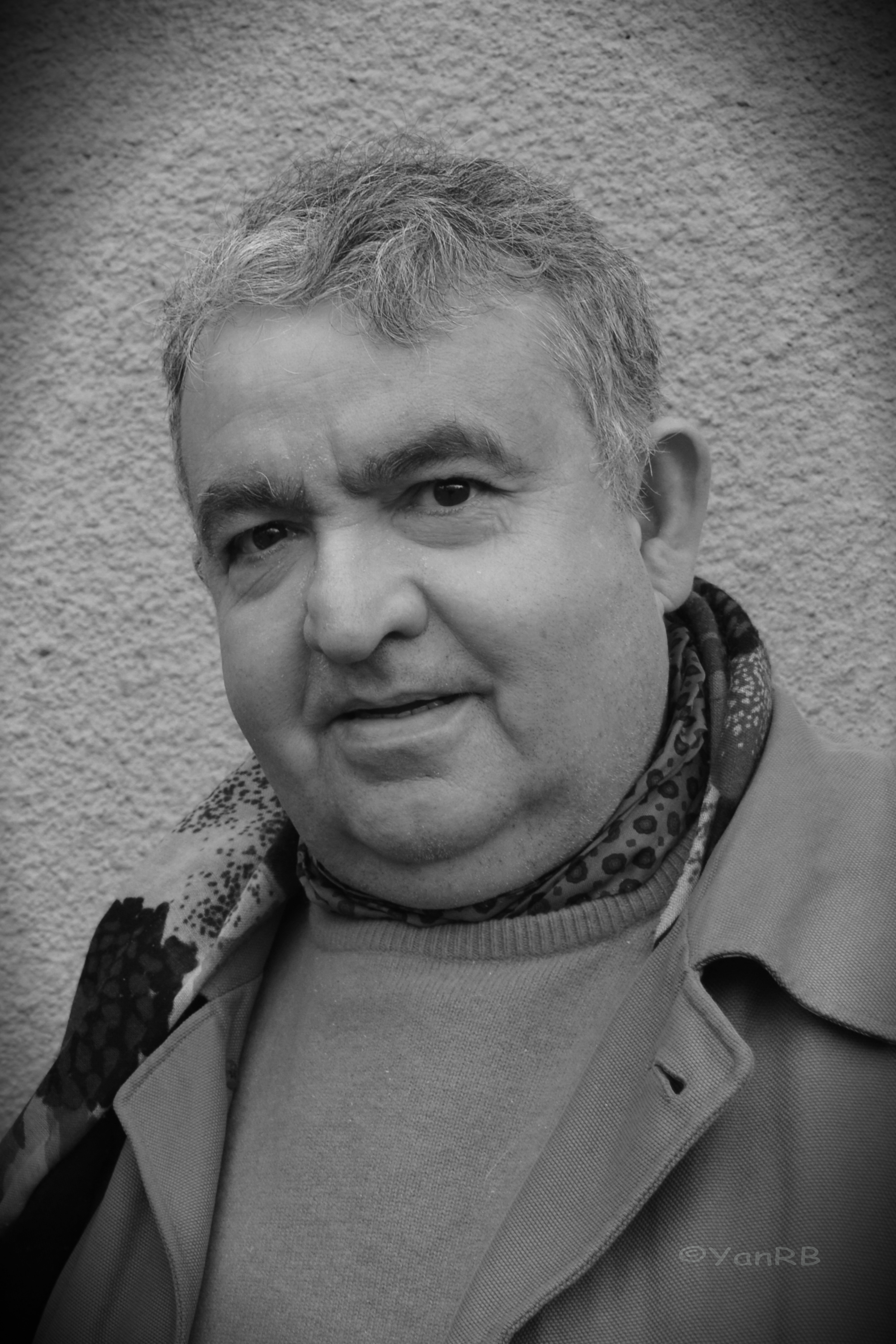
- Cancelier in 2018
- Born: 2 August 1959 (age 66); Paris, France
- Occupation: Actor
- Years active: 1984–present

Urbain Cancelier (born 2 August 1959) is a French comedian and actor, primarily known for his collaborations with French film director Jean-Pierre Jeunet, and for playing Collignon in Le Fabuleux Destin d'Amélie Poulain.

== Career ==
As a theater actor, he has not left the stage since the beginning of the 1980s. He worked several times with Bernard Murat, who made him the ideal interpreter of Georges Feydeau. Overall, he acted in more than thirty plays

In 2015, he received a nomination at the Molière Award for his role in the play Le Système, directed by Didier Long.

Spotted by Jean-Michel Ribes, he joined the series Palace in 1988.

But it was his role as the grocer Collignon in Amélie that popularised him. Since then, he became a regular supporting actor in French cinema.

== Personal life ==
He lives in Chalo-Saint-Mars with his wife. He has been elected to the municipal council for 3 terms in his commune.

== Theater ==
Year	Title	Author	Director	Notes
1985	Les Fourberies de Scapin	Molière	Jacques Bachelier	
1987	Une femme est un Diable	Prosper Mérimée	Frédérique Aufort	
1988	Les Cannibales	George Tabori	Wolfram Mhering	
1989	Séance de nuit	Georges Feydeau	Jean-Baptiste Fronty	
1989	C'est une femme du monde	Georges Feydeau	Jean-Baptiste Fronty	
1990	La Dame de chez Maxim	Georges Feydeau	Bernard Murat	
1992	Nina	André Roussin	Bernard Murat	
1992	A Flea in Her Ear	Georges Feydeau	Jean-Claude Brialy	
1993	Pygmalion	George Bernard Shaw	Bernard Murat	
1993	Tailleur pour dames	Georges Feydeau	Bernard Murat	
1994	On purge bébé	Georges Feydeau	Bernard Murat	
1995	Monsieur de Saint-Futile	Françoise Dorin	Jean-Luc Moreau	
1996–97	A Flea in Her Ear	Georges Feydeau	Bernard Murat	
1997	The Imaginary Invalid	Molière	Richard Taxy	
1998	Le Mari, la femme et l'amant	Sacha Guitry	Bernard Murat	
1998–99	Frédérick ou le boulevard du crime	Éric-Emmanuel Schmitt	Bernard Murat	
1999–2002	Frou-Frou les Bains	Patrick Haudecœur	Jacques Décombe	
2003–05	Devinez Qui ? Dix petits nègres	Agatha Christie	Bernard Murat	
2005	Amadeus	Peter Shaffer	Stéphane Hillel	
2007	Victor, or Power to the Children	Roger Vitrac	Alain Sachs	
2008–10	César, Fanny, Marius	Marcel Pagnol	Francis Huster	
2009	Les Deux Canards	Tristan Bernard & Alfred dAthis	Alain Sachs	
2010	Boubouroche	Georges Courteline	Nicolas Briançon	
2011	Kingdom on Earth	Tennessee Williams	Bernard Murat	
2011	Kramer vs. Kramer	Avery Corman	Didier Caron	
2012	Le Dindon	Georges Feydeau	Bernard Murat	
2012	A Midsummer Night's Dream	William Shakespeare	Nicolas Briançon	
2013–14	Thé à la menthe ou t'es citron ?	Patrick Haudecœur	Patrick Haudecœur	
2015	Le Système	Antoine Rault	Didier Long	Nominated - Molière Award for Best Supporting Actor
2016	Peau de Vache	Pierre Barillet & Jean-Pierre Gredy	Michel Fau	
2016	Du vent dans les branches de Sassafras	René de Obaldia	Bernard Murat	
2019–20	Frou-Frou les Bains	Patrick Haudecœur	Patrick Haudecœur	
2023	La Présidente	Maurice Hennequin & Pierre Veber	Jeoffrey Bourdenet	
2025	La Valse des pingouins	Patrick Haudecoeur	Patrick Haudecoeur	

== Filmography ==
Year	Title	Role	Director	Notes
1984	Jeans Tonic	A customer	Michel Patient	
1984	Quidam		Gérard Marx	TV Movie
1988–89	Palace	Various characters	Jean-Michel Ribes	TV Series
1989	Le voisin de Paul	A passer	Jean-Marie Gigon	Short
1989	Comme d'habitude		Bruno Herbulot	Short
1991	Pierre qui roule	The chief	Marion Vernoux	TV Movie
1991	Le gorille		Jean-Claude Sussfeld	TV series (1 episode)
1994	La Vengeance d'une blonde	The delivery guy	Jeannot Szwarc	
1995	Saint-Exupéry: La dernière mission	Barman	Robert Enrico	TV Movie
1996	Ridicule	Louis XVI	Patrice Leconte	
1996	Le bourgeois se rebiffe	Goubi	Jean-Pierre Alessandri	TV Movie
1997	On Guard	Argenson	Philippe de Broca	
1997	Tenue correcte exigée	Raoul Duchemin	Philippe Lioret	
1998	Riches, belles, etc.		Bunny Godillot	
1998	Le monde d'Angelo	Judge	Pascal Kané	TV Movie
1998	La dame aux camélias	Saint Gaudens	Jean-Claude Brialy	TV Movie
2000	H		Jean-Luc Moreau	TV series (1 episode)
2000	Chercheur d'héritiers	Marcel	Williams Crépin	TV series (1 episode)
2001	Amélie	Collignon	Jean-Pierre Jeunet	
2001	L'emmerdeuse	Mr. Duringer	Michaël Perrotta	TV series (2 episodes)
2002	Ma femme s'appelle Maurice	Poilard	Jean-Marie Poiré	
2002	Passage du bac	Chardon	Olivier Langlois	TV Movie
2002	La crim'	Xavier Danan	Denis Amar	TV series (1 episode)
2002	Femmes de loi	Deslandes	Denis Amar	TV series (1 episode)
2003	Les gaous	Police Chief	Igor Sekulic	
2003	L'adorable femme des neiges	Adrien	Jean-Marc Vervoort	TV Movie
2003	Josephine, Guardian Angel		Stéphane Kurc	TV series (1 episode)
2004	Malabar Princess	Gaston	Gilles Legrand	
2004	Intimate Strangers	Chatel	Patrice Leconte	
2004	A Very Long Engagement	The monk	Jean-Pierre Jeunet	
2005	13 Tzameti	Train controller	Géla Babluani	
2006	Les aristos	Réginald Saumur Chantilly	Charlotte de Turckheim	
2006	Incontrôlable	The producer	Raffy Shart	
2006	Le phénomène Paul-Émile Raoul	Peter Zbrig	Audrey Najar & Frédéric Perrot	Short
2006	Passés troubles	Chardin	Serge Meynard	TV Movie
2007	The Red Inn	Philippe de Marcillac	Gérard Krawczyk	
2007	Mr. Bean's Holiday	Bus Driver	Steve Bendelack	
2008	A Day at the Museum	Bernard	Jean-Michel Ribes	
2008	The Maiden and the Wolves	The doctor	Gilles Legrand	
2008	À droite toute	The doctor	Marcel Bluwal	TV Mini-series
2009	Micmacs	Urbain	Jean-Pierre Jeunet	
2009	Clara, une passion française	Émile	Sébastien Grall	TV Movie
2011	Voir la mer	The driver	Patrice Leconte	
2011	You Will Be My Son	Lacourt	Gilles Legrand	
2011	La pisseuse	Ignace	Ronan Denecé & Jean-Baptiste Legrand	Short
2011	Bas les coeurs	Barbier	Robin Davis	TV Movie
2011	Tout est bon dans le cochon	Mr. Paquet	David Delrieux	TV Movie
2012	The Suicide Shop	The gynecologist	Patrice Leconte	
2012	Bienvenue parmi nous	The butcher	Jean Becker	
2012	Les pirogues des hautes terres	René Barthes	Olivier Langlois	TV Movie
2013	Belle and Sebastian	The Mayor	Nicolas Vanier	
2014	La séance	Victor	Edouard de La Poëze	Short
2015	The Scent of Mandarin	Sergeant	Gilles Legrand	
2015	Belle & Sebastian: The Adventure Continues	The Mayor	Christian Duguay	
2016	Raid dingue	President of France	Dany Boon	
2016	The Visitors: Bastille Day	The Prison Chief	Jean-Marie Poiré	
2016	Deux escargots s'en vont	Voice	Jean-Pierre Jeunet & Romain Segaud	Short
2017	L'école buissonnière	Lucien	Nicolas Vanier	
2018	Les bonnes intentions	The uncle	Gilles Legrand	
2019	La Belle Époque	Villemain	Nicolas Bedos	
2019	Le Mari au collège	Casimir	Alberic Saint Martin	Short
2020	Das Boot	Father Michel	Matthias Glasner	TV series (1 episode)
2021	Eugénie Grandet	The stone merchant	Marc Dugain	
2021	Simone Veil, A Woman of the Century	Secretary General Parquet	Olivier Dahan	
