= Philippe Chevallier =

Philippe Chevallier may refer to:

- Philippe Chevallier (actor) (born 1956), French comedian and actor
- Philippe Chevallier (cyclist) (born 1961), French professional road bicycle racer
