= The Day of the Crows =

2012 animated film

- Film logo in French
- Directed by: Jean-Christophe Dessaint
- Screenplay by: Amandine Taffin
- Based on: The Day of the Crows by Jean-François Beauchemin
- Produced by: William Picot; Marc Jousset; Roger Frappier; Stephan Roelants
- Edited by: Opportune Taffin
- Music by: Simon Leclerc
- Distributed by: Gébéka Films
- Release date: 24 October 2012
- Running time: 96 minutes
- Countries: France; Luxembourg; Belgium; Canada
- Language: French
- Box office: $473,104

The Day of the Crows (French: Le Jour des corneilles) is a 2012 French-language traditionally animated fantasy film directed by Jean-Christophe Dessaint from a screenplay by Amandine Taffin, based on the eponymous 2004 novel by Québécois writer Jean-François Beauchemin. An international co-production with France, Luxemburg, Belgium and Canada, the film was produced by Finalement, Walking the Dog, Mélusine Productions, Max Films and uFilm. The Day of the Crows was released in Quebec, Canada on 19 October 2012, and in France and Belgium on 24 October.

== Premise ==
Courge lives deep in a magical forest haunted by spirits, raised by his father Courge, a giant who prevents him from exploring the outside world. One day, he is forced to go to the nearest village, where he meets the young girl Manon.

== Voice cast ==
The French voice cast is as follows:

- Lorànt Deutsch as Courge
- Jean Reno as Courge's father
- Isabelle Carré as Manon
- Claude Chabrol as the doctor
- Chantal Neuwirth as the old Bramble
- Bruno Podalydès as the nurse
- Philippe Uchan as the mayor

== Production ==
The Day of the Crows was announced on 19 October 2008, with Serge Elissalde originally set to direct. By March 2011, it was announced that Jean-Christophe Dessaint would direct the film. The soundtrack was composed by Simon Leclerc, and signed to Milan Records.

== Release ==
The Day of the Crows was released in Québécois cinemas on 19 October 2012 by Remstar, and in France and Belgium on 24 October by Gébéka Films and uDream respectively. In France, it grossed $336,144 from 186 theatres, and in Belgium The Day of the Crows grossed $4,923 in its opening week for a total gross of $50,539 from nine theatres. On 19 September 2013, it was released in Russia, Ukraine and in some Commonwealth of Independent States countries by Magna Tech Russia. Released in 132 theatres, it grossed $86,421, contributing to its worldwide box office gross of $473,104.
