= André Mandouze =

French writer (1916–2006)

André Mandouze (10 June 1916 in Bordeaux – 5 June 2006 in Porto-Vecchio), was a French academic, journalist, Catholic and anti-fascist and anti-colonialist activist.

In January 1946, when he was offered a post at the University of Algiers, he accepted with alacrity—for him, Algeria was the birthplace of Saint Augustine, to whom he had dedicated his thesis at the Sorbonne.

A confidant of Léon-Etienne Duval, he agitated for the independence of Algeria. With other Catholic intellectuals, such as François Mauriac, Louis Massignon, Henri Guillemin, Henri-Irénée Marrou, Pierre-Henri Simon, he criticised the French Army for using of torture in Algeria, in the pages of Le Monde and France-Observateur,

In 1963, at the request of Ahmed Ben Bella, he became rector of the University of Algiers. But with the arrival in power of Houari Boumédiène, he resumed being a professor in the university and then returned to Paris to teach Latin at the Sorbonne.

He did not return to Algeria until 2001, to preside with President Abdelaziz Bouteflika over a colloquium on Saint Augustine, who for him symbolised the link between Africaness and universalism.

== Biography ==
André Mandouze spent his childhood in Bordeaux and passed his baccalaureate at the Lycée Lonchamps, notably alongside his friend André Clavé, whom he would meet again throughout their shared struggles (influenced by their English teacher, Pierre Chamaillard).

A graduate of the École normale supérieure (Paris) (class of 1937), he obtained the agrégation in classics in 1939.

From 1941 to 1944, during the Occupation, André Mandouze took part in various clandestine civil and military networks of the French Resistance, and forged networks of Jewish-Christian friendship. As an assistant at the Faculty of Letters in Lyon, his students included Jean-Marie Domenach and Gilbert Dru, with whom he edited the Cahiers de notre jeunesse from June 1941 onwards. He made friends with the Dominican Order Jean-Augustin Maydieu, one of the founders of the Christian weekly Sept (closed by the Dominicans in 1937 on Vatican orders), and with the Jesuit Pierre Chaillet, founder of the Cahiers du Témoignage chrétien, for which he edited the June 1943 issue. From 1944 to the end of 1945, he was Editor-in-chief of Témoignage chrétien.

In 1946, he was appointed Professor of Latin at the Faculté des Lettres in University of Algiers 1. For him, Algeria is the birthplace of Saint Augustine, to whom he dedicated his doctoral thesis (Sorbonne). A close friend of Cardinal Duval, Archbishop of Algiers, he campaigned for Algerian independence. As early as 1947, he denounced the “myth of the three French departments”. In 1950, he edited Consciences algériennes, a magazine against colonization and for a free, democratic and social Algeria. He became actively involved with the National Liberation Front. He was arrested in November 1955 with other pro-FLN activists, but with the media support of Robert Barrat, François Mauriac and Jean-Marie Domenach, the accused were quickly released.

When Mendès-France resigned, the situation changed: André Mandouze's home was searched and he was imprisoned at La Santé in Paris (November and December 1956, 40 days) for “supporting the rebellion”. He was released at Christmas thanks to a vigorous public opinion campaign. Transferred to the Strasbourg faculty, he resumed teaching on April 1, 1956.

Along with other Catholic intellectuals such as François Mauriac, Louis Massignon, Henri Guillemin, Henri-Irénée Marrou (his Augustinian master) and Pierre-Henri Simon, he spoke out against torture in Esprit, Le Monde, France-Observateur, l'Express and Témoignage chrétien.

He signed the Manifesto of 121 in the summer of 1960, entitled “Declaration on the right to Draft evasion in the Algerian War”, and Algeria was grateful for his unfailing loyalty.

In 1961, La Révolution Algérienne par les Textes (Algerian Revolution through Texts), published by François Maspéro, was seized by the FLN to “reconstitute the image that the Algerian Republic has of itself”. Algerian independence occurred on July 5, 1962.

In 1963, Ahmed Ben Bella called on André Mandouze to become the first Director of Higher Education in independent Algeria. Mandouze set about reorganising the Algerian university system. With the arrival of Houari Boumédiène, he soon found it technically impossible to continue his task: “I beg you, Mr. President, to finally grant me an interview to receive my resignation in person”. Mandouze resigned to return to his position as professor at the University of Algiers (1964-1968).

== Works ==
- Intelligence et sainteté dans l'ancienne tradition chrétienne (Cerf, 1962)
- Histoire des saints et de la sainteté chrétienne (Hachette, 1986-1988)
- Mémoires d'outre-siècle : 1. D'une Résistance à l'autre (Viviane Hamy, 1998). 2. A gauche toute, bon Dieu! (Cerf, 2003)

== Bibliography ==
- Evans, Martin (2006-07-13). "Obituary: André Mandouze". the Guardian.
- "Nur al-Cubicle: Obituary: André Mandouze". Nur al-Cubicle. 2006-07-03.
- Evans, Martin (1997-11-01). The Memory of Resistance: French Opposition to the Algerian War (1954-1962). Oxford New York: Berg Publishers. ISBN 1-85973-927-X. (contains a long interview with Mandouze).
