= The Maiden and the Wolves =

2008 French film

- Theatrical release poster
- Directed by: Gilles Legrand
- Written by: Gilles Legrand; Philippe Vuaillat; Jean Cosmos
- Produced by: Frederic Brillion
- Starring: Laetitia Casta; Stefano Accorsi
- Cinematography: Yves Angelo
- Edited by: Andrea Sedláčková
- Music by: Armand Amar
- Production companies: Epithète Films; France 3 Cinéma; France 2 Cinéma; Auvergne-Rhône-Alpes Cinéma
- Distributed by: Warner Bros. Pictures
- Release date: 13 February 2008
- Running time: 110 minutes
- Country: France
- Language: French
- Box office: $3,571,232

The Maiden and the Wolves (French: La Jeune Fille et les loups) is a 2008 French film directed by Gilles Legrand.

== Cast ==
- Laetitia Casta as Angèle
- Stefano Accorsi as Giuseppe
- Jean-Paul Rouve as Emile Garcin
- Michel Galabru as Albert Garcin
- Patrick Chesnais as Léon Amblard
- Miglen Mirtchev as Zhormov
- Lorànt Deutsch as Anatole
- Didier Bénureau as Jacob, le louvetier
- Urbain Cancelier as le médecin
- Jean-Michel Ribes as le directeur de l'école vétérinaire
- Laurent Gamelon as le maréchal-ferrant
- Yves Gasc as le notaire
- Elisa Tovati as Séréna danseuse
- Agnès Sourdillon as Rosette
- Sophie-Charlotte Husson as Madeleine Amblard
- Fabienne Chaudat as la postière
- Roland Marchisio as un gendarme
- Marc Jeangeorge as Un ouvrier de l'usine
- Eric Rozé as Figurant
- Jean-Paul Pélissier sa Figurant
- Samuel Pélissier as Figurant

== Production ==
Filming took place in the spring of 2007 in Sixt-Fer-à-Cheval, Plateau des Glières, Argentière (Haute-Savoie) and in Cormet d'Arêches (Savoie).
