= Welcome to the Roses =

- Film poster
- Directed by: Francis Palluau
- Written by: Francis Palluau
- Produced by: Charles Gassot
- Starring: Carole Bouquet; Jean Dujardin; Lorànt Deutsch; André Wilms; Michel Duchaussoy
- Cinematography: Romain Winding
- Edited by: Véronique Parnet
- Music by: Serge Perathoner
- Distributed by: TFM Distribution
- Release date: 2 April 2003
- Running time: 90 minutes
- Country: France
- Language: French
- Budget: $5.4 million
- Box office: $2.5 million

Welcome to the Roses (original title: Bienvenue chez les Rozes) is a 2003 French comedy film, written and directed by Francis Palluau. It stars Jean Dujardin, Carole Bouquet and Lorànt Deutsch.

== Plot ==
Two armed convicts on the run, one wounded, take hostage the middle-class Roze family in a pleasant French suburb. TV news reports that the two guards escorting them have been shot dead. Father, mother and 18-year-old daughter show a high degree of sympathy for and cooperation with their captors. Wounds are dressed, clothes washed, a good dinner served, fine wines drunk and separately the two women offer themselves. But slowly the picture is reversed. Rather than hardened criminals, the intruders are petty malefactors jailed through mistakes. Their escape was accidental when one guard killed the other and then committed suicide, so they are not murderers. As for the family, after the charming and sexy Madame Roze kills the maid by sinking a sickle into her back, the others are gradually revealed to be little better than their unwanted guests. In the end the two prisoners slip quietly away while the Roze family are handcuffed and led in front of all their neighbours to a police van.

== Cast ==
- Lorànt Deutsch as Gilbert
- Jean Dujardin as MG
- Carole Bouquet as Béatrice
- Clémence Poésy as Magali
- André Wilms as Daniel
- Yolande Moreau as Marsanne
- Dominique Pinon as The Lieutenant
- Michel Duchaussoy as Jean-Louis
- Beatrice Rosen as Agnès
- Christian Pereira as Doctor Merlot
- Clément van den Bergh as Ludovic
- Michèle Comba as Gilbert's mother
- Michel Derville as The banker
- Jean-Baptiste Shelmerdine as The junkie
- Olivier Saladin as The neighbor
- Charlotte Becquin as The young professor
- Daniel Kenigsberg as The headmaster
- Philippe Lamendin as The journalist
- Daniela Lumbroso as The journalist
- Vincent Martin as The lawyer
