= A Day at the Museum =

- Theatrical release poster
- French: Musée haut, musée bas
- Directed by: Jean-Michel Ribes
- Written by: Jean-Michel Ribes
- Produced by: Frédéric Brillion; Gilles Legrand; Dominique Besnehard; Michel Feller; Camille Nahassia
- Cinematography: Pascal Ridao
- Edited by: Yann Malcor
- Production companies: Epithète Films; Mon Voisin Productions; France 3 Cinéma
- Distributed by: Warner Bros. Pictures
- Release date: 19 November 2008
- Running time: 97 minutes
- Country: France
- Language: French
- Budget: $8.7 million
- Box office: $3.9 million

A Day at the Museum (French: Musée haut, musée bas; lit. 'High museum, low museum') is a 2008 French ensemble comedy film directed by Jean-Michel Ribes.

== Plot ==
The museum seen as a microcosm. This is both a theater, with its stage and behind the scenes, and an anthill with his queen (Conservative), his soldiers (guards) her workers (handlers) and aphids (visitors).

== Cast ==
- Michel Blanc as Mosk
- Simon Abkarian as Gilles Paulin
- Victoria Abril as Clara
- Pierre Arditi as Henri Province
- Alfredo Arias as Perdeli
- Josiane Balasko as Mother Chanel
- Évelyne Bouix as Nina Paulin
- Urbain Cancelier as Bernard
- Isabelle Carré as Carole Province
- Judith Chemla as Rosine Bagnole
- Loïc Corbery as Luc
- Éva Darlan as the 'Family Art' guide
- Franck de la Personne as Rochebouet
- François-Xavier Demaison as the head home
- André Dussollier as the minister
- Julie Ferrier as the 'Prospect' guide
- Grégory Gadebois as Georges Paulin
- Guillaume Gallienne as Max Perdelli
- Laurent Gamelon as Lionel
- Annie Grégorio as Fernande
- Samir Guesmi as a guardian
- Gérard Jugnot as Roland Province
- Philippe Khorsand as Frilon
- Valérie Lemercier as Valérie
- Fabrice Luchini as a guardian
- Valérie Mairesse as Thérèse
- Marilú Marini as Giovanna Perdelli
- Yolande Moreau as Madame Stenthels
- François Morel as Hervé Parking
- Chantal Neuwirth as Anne
- Aurélia Petit as the 'Karl Paulin' guide
- Dominique Pinon as Simon
- Micheline Presle as Liliane
- Daniel Prévost as Maurice Bagnole
- Muriel Robin as Dame Kandinsky
- Dominique Besnehard as a visitor
- Louis-Do de Lencquesaing as Jocelyn Paulin
- Michèle Garcia
- Pierre Lescure as Christian
- Tonie Marshall as Laurence
- Géraldine Martineau as the girl in green checkered dress
- Yves Pignot as the cashier
- Samuel Theis as the reviewer
