= Un aller simple (2001 film) =

2001 film by Laurent Heynemann

- Directed by: Laurent Heynemann
- Written by: Albert Algoud; Laurent Heynemann; Didier Van Cauwelaert
- Starring: Lorant Deutsch; Jacques Villeret; Barbara Schulz
- Cinematography: Carlo Varini
- Edited by: Marion Monestier
- Music by: Bruno Coulais
- Distributed by: BAC Films
- Release date: 31 May 2001
- Running time: 90 minutes
- Country: France
- Language: French

Un aller simple (One-way ticket) is a 2001 French adventure-comedy film directed by Laurent Heynemann, adapted from the novel of the same name by Didier Van Cauwelaert, which had won the Prix Goncourt in 1994.

== Plot ==
Aziz (Lorant Deutsch) was born in France, the child of unknown parents. Gathered up by gypsies from the area north of Marseille, he has grown up as a Moroccan national. Jean-Pierre (Jacques Villeret), is a civil servant in the Ministry of Foreign Affairs. He is being cheated on by his wife who is having an affair with his boss and he no longer feels attached to his Parisian life. It is given to Jean-Pierre to 're-integrate' Aziz, a stolen baby, raised by gypsies, neither Arab nor gypsy, into his 'native' country of Morocco. Aziz is an interesting client for him. But Aziz is just a young man without sure roots who has never set foot in Morocco, though he affects to belong to the tribe of the Grey Men of Irghiz who live in a forbidden city high in the Atlas Mountains. And the two rootless men make the acquaintance of the sparkling Valerie (Barbara Schulz) who will act as their guide.

== Cast ==
- Jacques Villeret as Jean-Pierre
- Barbara Schulz as Valerie
- Lorànt Deutsch as Aziz
- Jean Benguigui as Place Vendôme
- Eva Ionesco as Clémentine
- Melissa Mars as Lila
