= Ma femme s'appelle Maurice =

- Theatrical release poster
- Directed by: Jean-Marie Poiré
- Written by: Jean-Marie Poiré; Raffy Shart
- Produced by: Henning Molfenter; Jean-Marie Poiré; Hartwig Schulte-Loh; Igor Sekulic
- Starring: Régis Laspalès; Philippe Chevallier; Alice Evans; Götz Otto; Anémone; Martin Lamotte; Virginie Lemoine; Guy Marchand; Urbain Cancelier
- Cinematography: Robert Alazraki
- Edited by: Jean-Marie Poiré; Henry Revlou
- Music by: Pierre Charvet; Vincent Prezioso
- Production companies: Comédie Star; France 2 Cinéma
- Distributed by: Warner Bros. Pictures
- Release date: 25 September 2002
- Running time: 102 minutes
- Country: France
- Language: French
- Budget: $17 million
- Box office: $3.8 million

Ma femme s'appelle Maurice (English: My Wife's Name Is Maurice) is a 2002 French comedy film directed by Jean-Marie Poiré and starring Alice Evans, Régis Laspalès, Philippe Chevallier and Götz Otto.

== Cast ==
- Régis Laspalès as Maurice Lappin
- Philippe Chevallier as Georges Audefey
- Anémone as Claire Trouabal
- Martin Lamotte as Jean-Bernard Trouabal
- Virginie Lemoine as Marion Audefey
- Guy Marchand as Charles Boisdain
- Urbain Cancelier as Poilard
- Alice Evans as Emmanuelle
- Götz Otto as Johnny Zucchini
- Stéphane Audran as Jacqueline Boisdain
- Marco Bonini as Marcello
- Jean-Pierre Castaldi as Le concessionnaire
- Michèle Garcia as The seller
- Sylvie Joly as The Orlyval woman
- Raphaël Mezrahi as The man at the fashion show
- Danièle Évenou as The baker
- Paul Belmondo as The car seller 1
- Benjamin Castaldi as The car seller 2
