= Lorànt Deutsch =

French actor and writer

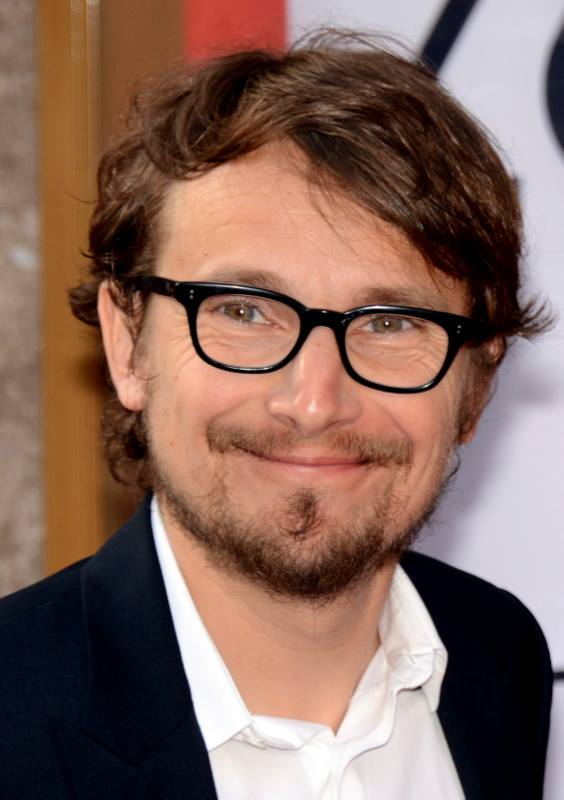
- Lorànt Deutsch in 2014
- Born: 27 October 1975 (age 50); Alençon, France
- Occupation(s): Actor, writer
- Spouse: Marie-Julie Baup (m. 2009)
- Children: 3

Lorànt Deutsch (French pronunciation: [lɔrɑ̃ dœtʃ]; born László Matekovics on 27 October 1975), is a French actor and writer.

Deutsch was born in Alençon to a Hungarian-Jewish father and a Romanian mother. An ardent Catholic, Deutsch says he is a royalist.

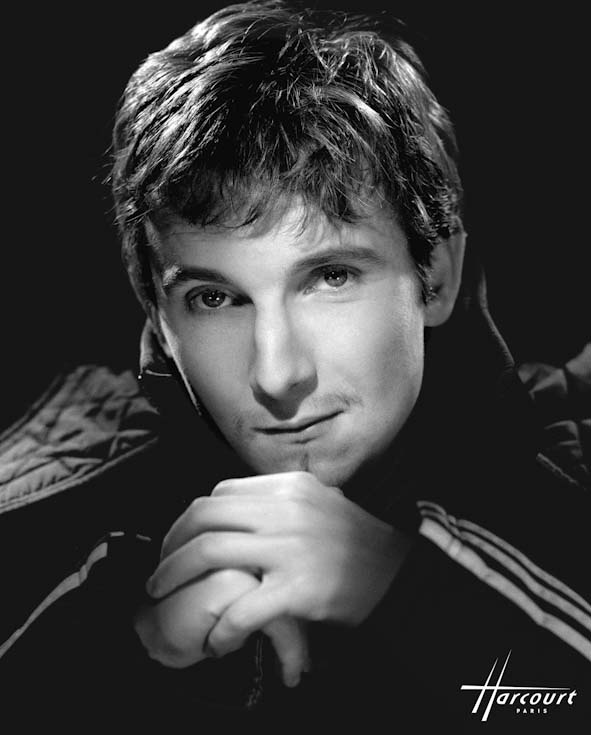
Deutsch photographed by Studio Harcourt, 2004

In 2005, Deutsch met actress Marie-Julie Baup when they worked together during Amadeus. After working together for several more years while cast in The Importance of Being Earnest, they married in 2009, on 3 October, and now have three children.

== Filmography ==
=== Actor ===
- 1994: L'Eau froide by Olivier Assayas
- 1997: Les Randonneurs by Philippe Harel: Jean
- 1999: Le Ciel, les oiseaux et... ta mère ! by Djamel Bensalah: Christophe
- 1999: Peut-être by Cédric Klapisch: Prince Fur
- 2000: Là-bas, mon pays by Alexandre Arcady: Versanti
- 2000: Jet Set by Fabien Onteniente: Fifi
- 2000: L'Envol by Steve Suissa: Franky
- 2001: Un aller simple by Laurent Heynemann: Aziz
- 2001: HS Hors Service by Jean-Paul Lilienfeld
- 2002: Le Raid by Djamel Bensalah: Tacchini
- 2002: 3 zéros by Fabien Onteniente: Tibor Kovacs
- 2003: Bienvenue chez les Rozes by Francis Palluau: Gilbert
- 2003: Le Coût de la vie by Philippe Le Guay: Patrick
- 2003: Ripoux 3 by Clauby Zidi: Julien
- 2003: Les Clefs de bagnole by Laurent Baffie
- 2004: Les Amateurs by Martin Valente: Christophe Pichon
- 2004: Pour le plaisir by Dominique Deruddere: Jean
- 2004: Nos amis les flics by Bob Swaim: Bénisti
- 2004: L'Américain by Patrick Timsit: Francis Farge
- 2005: Ze Film by Guy Jacques: Bilou
- 2006: Le Temps des porte-plumes by Daniel Duval: Pierre Dubrac
- 2007: Jean de La Fontaine, le défi by Daniel Vigne: Jean de La Fontaine
- 2007: Big City by Djamel Bensalah
- 2008: The Maiden and the Wolves by Gilles Legrand: Anatole
- 2008: Le Plaisir de chanter by Ilan Duran Cohen: Philippe
- 2008: Home Sweet Home by Didier Le Pêcheur: the barkeeper
- 2008: Mazli by Tamas Kemenyffy: Ivan
- 2009: Humains by Jacques-Olivier Molon et Pierre-Olivier Thévenin: Thomas
- 2010: Ailleurs by Valérie Muller
- 2011: Tu seras mon fils by Gilles Legrand
- 2016: Les Visiteurs: La Révolution by Jean-Marie Poiré

=== Voice-overs ===
- 2001 : La Planète au trésor, un nouvel univers (Treasure Planet) by Ron Clements et John Musker voix du robot B.E.N (Bio-Electron-Navigateur)
- 2003 : La méthode Bourchnikov by Grégoire Sivan (short film)
- 2003 : Loulou by Serge Elissalde (short film), presented in Loulou et les autres loups
- 2005 : Le Roman de Renart : Rufus (voice)
- 2005 : Chicken Little : Chicken Little (voice) (dubbed by Zach Braff in the original version)
- 2006 : Astérix et les Vikings by Stefan Fjeldmark et Jesper Moller : Goudurix (voice)
- 2008 : Max et Co by Robert Boner and Benoît Dreyer : Max (voice)
- 2009 : Kérity, la maison des contes by Dominique Monféry : le Lapin Blanc
- 2009 : Cosmic Collisions, French version for the Futuroscope (Chocs Cosmiques) and the Cité des sciences et de l'industrie (Collisions cosmiques)
- 2009 : La fabuleuse histoire des jeux vidéo, documentary by Charles Henry Flavigny and Alexandre de Seguins
- 2010 : La Véritable Histoire des Bleus, documentary by Stéphane Benamou
- 2011 : Rio by Carlos Saldanha : Blu
- 2011 : Les Schtroumpfs by Raja Gosnell : le Schtroumpf à Lunettes
- 2013 : Les Schtroumpfs 2 by Raja Gosnell : le Schtroumpf à Lunettes
- 2014 : Rio 2 by Carlos Saldanha : Blu

=== Short features ===
- 1997 : Y a du foutage dans l'air by Djamel Bensalah
- 1999 : Une heureuse rencontre by Emmanuel Paulin
- 2000 : Scénario sur la drogue : Exta-ordinaire by Manuel Boursinhac
- 2000 : C’est pas tous les jours marrant by Christophe Turpin
- 2001 : Le Peloton by David Morlet
- 2001 : Ces jours heureux by Olivier Nakache and Éric Toledano
- 2001 : Ta sœur by Martin Valente
- 2002 : À louer by James L. Frachon
- 2009 : La Librairie de Schrödinger by Claire Vassé et Christophe Beauvais (nominations Festivals de Pantin, Angers, Gagny et Pontault-Combault)

=== Television ===
- 1993 : Les Intrépides : Tom Miller
- 1995 : Highlander : young Georges (1 episode) as Laurent Deutsch
- 1997 : Ma voyante préférée : Djee-Gang
- 1997 : Les Bœufs-Carottes : Gégé (1 episode)
- 1998 : La Façon de le dire by Sébastien Grall : Nicolas
- 1998 : H : Loïc Zolla, the intern (2 episodes)
- 1999 : Les Hirondelles d'hiver, by André Chandelle : Peau de lapin
- 2000 : Le Lycée : Didier Morillon
- 2000 : Les Cordier, juge et flic (épisode 34) : Nicolas
- 2002 : Un Paradis pour deux : Arthur
- 2002 : Caméra café : Simon (1 episode)
- 2004 : Kaamelott : the Burgundian interpreter (1 episode)
- 2004 : Le Triporteur de Belleville by Stéphane Kurc : Victor
- 2005 : Les Amants du Flore : Jean-Paul Sartre
- 2006 : L'Académie du Foot sur Arte : Narrator
- 2008 : Mister Mocky présente by Jean-Pierre Mocky (1 episode)
- 2009 : Facteur chance by Julien Seri : Jef
- 2010 : Les Diamants de la victoire by Vincent Monnet : Théophile, vicomte de Chandrilles
- 2010 : Le Roi, l'écureuil et la couleuvre by Laurent Heynemann : Fouquet
- 2011 : Les livres qui tuent by Denys Granier-Deferre : Léo Schwartz-Lenoir

== Theater ==
- La Dispute by Marivaux
- Arlequin poli par l'amour by Marivaux
- 2002 : La Reine de beauté de Leenane by Martin McDonagh, staging Gildas Bourdet, Théâtre de l'Ouest Parisien
- 2005 : Amadeus by Peter Shaffer, staging Stéphane Hillel, Théâtre de Paris
- 2006 : L'Importance d'être constant by Oscar Wilde, staging Pierre Laville, Théâtre Antoine
- 2007 : L'Importance d'être constant by Oscar Wilde, staging Pierre Laville, Théâtre Antoine
- 2007 : Victor ou les enfants au pouvoir by Roger Vitrac, staging Alain Sachs, Théâtre Antoine
- 2008 : L'Importance d'être constant by Oscar Wilde, staging Pierre Laville, Opéra de Massy, tournée
- 2009 : L'Anniversaire by Harold Pinter, staging Michel Fagadau, Comédie des Champs-Élysées
- 2009 : Le Roman d' un trader by Jean-Louis Bauer, staging Daniel Benoin, théâtre national de Nice, Théâtre de la Croix-Rousse
- 2010 : Face au paradis by Nathalie Saugeon, staging Rachida Brakni, Théâtre Marigny
- 2010 : Boubouroche by Philippe Uchan after Georges Courteline, staging Nicolas Briançon
- 2011 : Le songe d'une nuit d'été by William Shakespeare, staging Nicolas Briançon, Festival d'Anjou, Théâtre de la Porte Saint-Martin

== Books ==
- 2009: Métronome, l'histoire de France au rythme du métro parisien, with Emmanuel Haymann, Paris: Michel Lafon - ISBN 978-2-7499-1011-6
