= The Visitors: Bastille Day =

- Theatrical release poster
- Les Visiteurs: La Révolution
- Directed by: Jean-Marie Poiré
- Written by: Jean-Marie Poiré; Christian Clavier
- Produced by: Christian Clavier; Sidonie Dumas; Jean-Marie Poiré
- Starring: Christian Clavier; Jean Reno; Franck Dubosc; Karin Viard; Sylvie Testud; Marie-Anne Chazel; Ary Abittan; Alex Lutz
- Cinematography: Stéphane Le Parc
- Edited by: Philippe Bourgueil
- Music by: Eric Lévi
- Production companies: Gaumont; Ouille Productions; TF1 Films Production; Nexus Factory; Okko Productions
- Distributed by: Gaumont
- Release date: 6 April 2016
- Running time: 110 minutes
- Countries: France; Belgium; Czech Republic
- Language: French
- Budget: $27 million
- Box office: $18.6 million

The Visitors: Bastille Day (original title: Les Visiteurs: La Révolution) is a 2016 French-Belgian-Czech comedy film directed by Jean-Marie Poiré.

It is the third film in the trilogy Les Visiteurs, following The Visitors II: The Corridors of Time released eighteen years earlier in 1998. The first film in the series was released twenty-three years earlier in 1993.

The film was produced by Sidonie Dumas (Gaumont), Sylvain Goldberg and Serge de Poucques (Nexus Factory), Christian Clavier (Ouille Productions) and Jean-Marie Poiré. Both Poiré and Clavier co-wrote the script, as was also the case for the two previous films.

Only three actors from the two previous films appear in this third one: Christian Clavier, Jean Reno and Marie-Anne Chazel. Of those three actors, only Reno and Clavier play the same characters that they played in the previous films, namely the medieval knight Godefroy de Montmirail and his squire Jacquouille la Fripouille. They are accompanied by new protagonists played by Franck Dubosc, Karin Viard, Sylvie Testud, Ary Abittan, Alex Lutz and Pascal N'Zonzi.

Filmed from April to June 2015 in the Czech Republic and Belgium, the film is, after the remake Just Visiting (2001), the second film in the franchise not to have been filmed in France. It also marked the return of Jean-Marie Poiré to film directing after a long break of almost fourteen years. The Visitors: Bastille Day was a critical and commercial failure in France.

== Plot ==
After Béatrice de Montmirail (played by Muriel Robin in the second opus) added an ill-chosen liqueur (Grand Marnier) in the time-travel potion during her niece-in-law's wedding, the time-traveling medieval knight Godefroy de Montmirail and his servant Jacquouille la Fripouille arrive in 1793, in the middle of the French Revolution, and find themselves caught up in the Reign of Terror. They meet Jacquouillet, the descendant of Jacquouille, who serves as a public accuser. Godefroy also meets one of his own descendants, who tries to escape the revolution. Godefroy and his squire help him to escape, while also attempting to find a descendant of Eusæbius the Enchanter, who sent them forward in time in the first place, so that they can go back to their own period of time.

== Cast ==
- Christian Clavier as Jacquouille la Fripouille / Jacquouillet / Edmond Jacquart
- Jean Reno as Godefroy Amaury de Malfête, comte de Montmirail, d'Apremont et de Papincourt
- Franck Dubosc as Gonzague de Montmirail / François Montmirail
- Karin Viard as Adélaïde de Montmirail
- Sylvie Testud as Charlotte de Robespierre / Geneviève Carraud-Robespierre
- Marie-Anne Chazel as Prune
- Ary Abittan as Lorenzo Baldini, marquis de Portofino
- Alex Lutz as Robert de Montmirail
- Stéphanie Crayencour as Victoire-Églantine de Montmirail
- Pascal N'Zonzi as Philibert
- Frédérique Bel as Flore
- Nicolas Vaude as Maximilien de Robespierre
- Christian Hecq as Jean-Paul Marat
- Christelle Cornil as Simone Marat
- Lorànt Deutsch as Jean-Marie Collot d'Herbois
- Mathieu Spinosi as Louis Antoine de Saint-Just
- François Bureloup as Georges Couthon
- Nicolas Lumbreras as Jacques-Nicolas Billaud-Varenne
- Cyril Lecomte as Joseph Fouché
- Alexandre von Sivers as Eusèbe
- Dimitri Storoge as Commissaire Verdier
- Serge Papagalli as the coachman
- Véronique Boulanger as Élise
- Éric De Staercke as Dutch duke
- Patrick Descamps as Louis VI "le Gros", King of France
- David Salles as Ralph I of Vermandois
- Annie Grégorio as Honorine
- Götz Otto as Colonel Wurtz
- Urbain Cancelier as the chief jailer at the prison of Issoudun
- Jean-Luc Couchard as the accuser Legendre
- Guillaume Briat as Robinot
- Joëlle Sevilla as Mrs. Robinot
- Julie-Marie Parmentier as Norah
- Chantal Pirotte as Catherine Théot
- Elliot Goldberg as Thibaud de Montmirail
- Horatia Taittinger as Marie-Thérèse de Montmirail
