= Marie-Julie Baup =

French actress (born 1979)

- Born: 10 April 1979 (age 46); Paris
- Occupations: Actor, comedian, writer
- Spouse: Lorànt Deutsch
- Children: 3
- Awards: 2013 Palmarès du théâtre, Best Supporting Actress

Marie-Julie Baup (born 10 April 1979, Paris) is a French actress, writer, and comedian. Her work includes roles in Micmacs onscreen and A Midsummer Night's Dream onstage, and she has received several nominations for various Molière Awards and won the award for Best Supporting Actress in 2013. She is married to Lorànt Deutsch, whom she met while they were in a production of Amadeus in 2005. In 2023, she won the Molière award for Best Actress in Private Theater, and also the awards for Private Theater and Best Direction in Private Theater with co-director Thierry Lopez.

== Career ==
After growing up in Yvelines, Baup found her career of choice when cast in a school play, The Bald Soprano, at age 11. In 2005, she performed her first major role in a 2005 adaptation of Amadeus alongside Jean Piat and Lorànt Deutsch at the Théâtre de Paris; she and Deutsch were separately nominated for the Molière Award for Best Newcomer for their performances. From 2006 to 2008, she played a role in The Importance of Being Earnest at the Théâtre Antoine-Simone Berriau. In 2009, she took the role of "Calculator" in Micmacs. In 2013, she won the Molière Award for Best Supporting Actress for her performance in a 2013 run of A Midsummer Night's Dream at the Théâtre de la Porte Saint-Martin. In 2014, she was nominated for another Molière award for her performance in the play Divina, once again for the Molière Award for Best Supporting Actress. Baup and husband Deutsch worked together once again for a 2015 revival of Irma La Douce, which was nominated for the Molière award for best musical.

In 2023, Baup and actor/director Thierry Lopez directed Oublie-moi by Matthew Saeger, which was then nominated for 4 Molière awards: Private Theater, Best Actress in Private Theater, Best Actor in Private Theater, and Best Direction in Private Theater. They won all 4 nominations.

== Filmography ==
=== Film ===
| Year | Title | Role | Notes |
|---|---|---|---|
| 2004 | The Giraffe's Neck | Young girl on train | |
| 2008 | Mark of an Angel | Nurse | |
| 2009 | Micmacs | Calculator | Shortlisted for a César Award for Most Promising Actress nomination |
| 2012 | 10 jours en or | Boutique owner | |
| 2014 | Amour sur place ou à emporter | Blair Witch | |
| 2017 | The Teacher | The doctor at the hospital | |
| 2017 | Jalouse | Isabelle | |
| 2018 | Les Bonnes intentions | Agnès | |
| 2021 | Delicious | Marquise de Saint-Genet | |
| 2024 | Monsieur Aznavour | Édith Piaf | |

=== Television ===
| Year | Title | Role | Notes |
|---|---|---|---|
| 2006 | Hé M'sieur | Martine Marot | A television film. |
| 2006 | L'État de Grace | Nurse | A miniseries. |
| 2008 | Paris enquêtes criminelles (episode "Trafics") | Fanny Delorme | |
| 2010 | Le Roi, l'Écureuil et la Couleuvre | Catherine de Manneville | |
| 2012 | Les Pieds dans le plat | Anouchka Stern | A television film. |
| 2014–2018 | A Very Secret Service | Marie-Jo Cotin | |
| 2015 | Une chance de trop | Claire Lambert | |
| 2018 | Le Jour où j'ai brûlé mon coeur | Suzanna | |

=== Theater ===
| Year | Title | Role | Theater | Notes |
|---|---|---|---|---|
| 2005 | Amadeus | | Théâtre de Paris | See awards |
| 2006 | The Importance of Being Earnest | | Théâtre Antoine | |
| 2007 | The Importance of Being Earnest | | Théâtre Antoine | |
| 2008 | The Importance of Being Earnest | | Opéra de Massy | |
| 2008 | Question d'envie | | Petit Théâtre de Paris | Her own written work |
| 2009–2010 | Les Femmes savantes | | Théâtre 14 Jean-Marie Serreau, Petit Théâtre de Paris | Festival d'Anjou |
| 2009–2010 | Les Femmes savantes | | Petit Théâtre de Paris | |
| 2010 | On purge bébé / Léonie est en avance | | Théâtre du Palais-Royal | |
| 2011 | A Midsummer Night's Dream | | Théâtre de la Porte Saint-Martin | Festival d'Anjou |
| 2012 | Tartarin de Tarascon | | Théâtre André Malraux | Created role |
| 2013 | A Midsummer Night's Dream | | Théâtre de la Porte Saint-Martin | See awards |
| 2013 | La Station Champbaudet | | Théâtre Marigny | |
| 2013 | Divina | | Théâtre des Variétés | See awards |
| 2015 | Irma La Douce | | Théâtre de la Porte Saint-Martin | Musical nominated for a Molière |
| 2016 | Le Plus beau jour | | Théâtre Hébertot | |
| 2017 | Faisons un rêve | | Théâtre de la Madeleine | Festival d'Anjou |
| 2018 | Papa va bientôt rentrer | | Théâtre de Paris | |
| 2018 | Le Prénom | | Théâtre Édouard VII | |

== Awards and nominations ==
| Year | Organisation | Award | Work | Result |
|---|---|---|---|---|
| 2005 | Molière Award | Best Newcomer | | Nominated |
| 2013 | Molière Award as the Palmarès du théâtre | Best Supporting Actress | A Midsummer's Night Dream | Won |
| 2013 | Molière Award | Best Supporting Actress | Divina | Nominated |
| 2023 | Molière Award | Best Actress | Oublie-moi | Won |
| 2023 | Molière Award | Best Direction (with Thierry Lopez) | Oublie-moi | Won |

== Personal life ==
In 2005, Baup met Deutsch when they worked together during Amadeus. After working together for several more years while cast in The Importance of Being Earnest, they married in 2009 and now have three children.
