= Désiré (1996 film) =

- Directed by: Bernard Murat
- Written by: Sacha Guitry (play)
- Produced by: Boudjemaa Dahmane; Daniel Toscan du Plantier
- Starring: Jean-Paul Belmondo; Fanny Ardant; Claude Rich
- Cinematography: Ricardo Aronovitch
- Edited by: Colette Farrugia
- Music by: Jean-Claude Petit
- Distributed by: AMLF
- Release date: 1996
- Running time: 93 min
- Country: France
- Language: French
- Budget: $3.6 million
- Box office: $1 million

Désiré is a 1996 French film directed by Bernard Murat. The film is based on the play of the same name by Sacha Guitry.

== Plot ==
Désiré is an experienced late-stage career butler and Don Juan figure who frequently seduces the ladies of the house before moving on romantically, but in this tale, finds himself truly in love.

== Cast ==
- Jean-Paul Belmondo as Désiré
- Fanny Ardant as Odette
- Claude Rich as Montignac
- Béatrice Dalle as Madeleine
- Jean Yanne as Corniche
- Dominique Lavanant as Henriette
- Annie Grégorio as Adèle
