= Brèves de comptoir =

- Film poster
- Directed by: Jean-Michel Ribes
- Written by: Jean-Michel Ribes; Jean-Marie Gourio
- Produced by: Dominique Besnehard; Michel Feller; Jean-Michel Ribes; Julien Deris; David Gauquie; Etienne Mallet
- Cinematography: Philippe Guilbert
- Edited by: Scott Stevenson
- Production companies: Mon Voisin Productions; Ulysse Films
- Distributed by: Diaphana Films
- Release date: 24 September 2014
- Running time: 96 minutes
- Country: France
- Language: French
- Budget: $5 million
- Box office: $1.1 million

Brèves de comptoir (Counter brief) is a 2014 French ensemble comedy directed by Jean-Michel Ribes.

== Plot ==
The life of a small cafe in the suburbs, Swallow, is opened at six in the morning until closing.

== Cast ==
- Chantal Neuwirth as The café owner
- Didier Bénureau as The café owner
- Régis Laspalès as Mussel
- Yolande Moreau as Madame Lamelle
- Valérie Mairesse as Madame Pelton
- André Dussollier as The politician
- François Morel as Pivert
- Michel Fau as The writer
- Laurent Stocker as Monsieur Laroque
- Philippe Chevallier as Monsieur Latour
- Samir Guesmi as Couss
- Daniel Russo as Jacky
- Laurent Gamelon as Rubens
- Dominique Pinon as A taxi
- Grégory Gadebois as A taxi
- India Hair as The greedy woman
- Bruno Solo as Bolo
- Alexie Ribes as Gigi
- Michelle Bréant as Virginie
- Marcel Philippot as Monsieur Rabier
- Annie Grégorio as The postwoman
- Olivier Saladin as Pulmoll
- Dioucounda Koma as Dakar
- Dominique Besnehard as Chorister
- Alban Casterman as Monsieur Jean
- Jean-Toussaint Bernard as The funeral employee
