= Le Quatuor =

French music group and actors

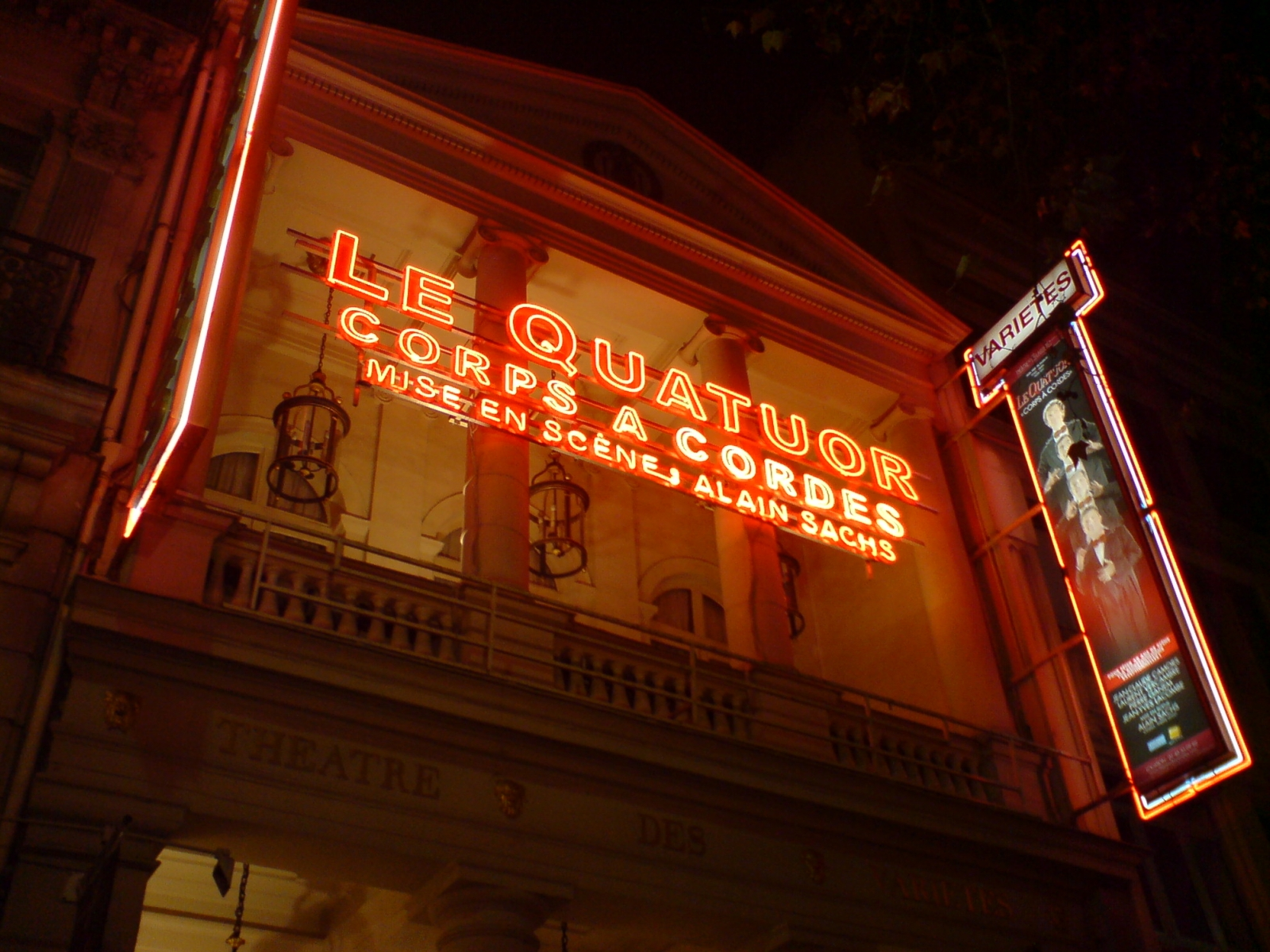
Neon signage for Le Quatuor's "Corps à cordes" act in Paris, 2009

Le Quatuor ('the Quartet' in French) are a group of French musicians and stage actors known for their musical comedy acts.

The quartet has existed for around 30 years (as of 2011), and is composed of Jean-Claude Camors (violin), Laurent Vercambre (violin), Pierre Ganem (viola), and Jean-Yves Lacombe (cello). Their most recent stage show as of 2011 was 'Corps à Cordes'.
