= Yves Ravey =

French novelist and playwright (born 1953)

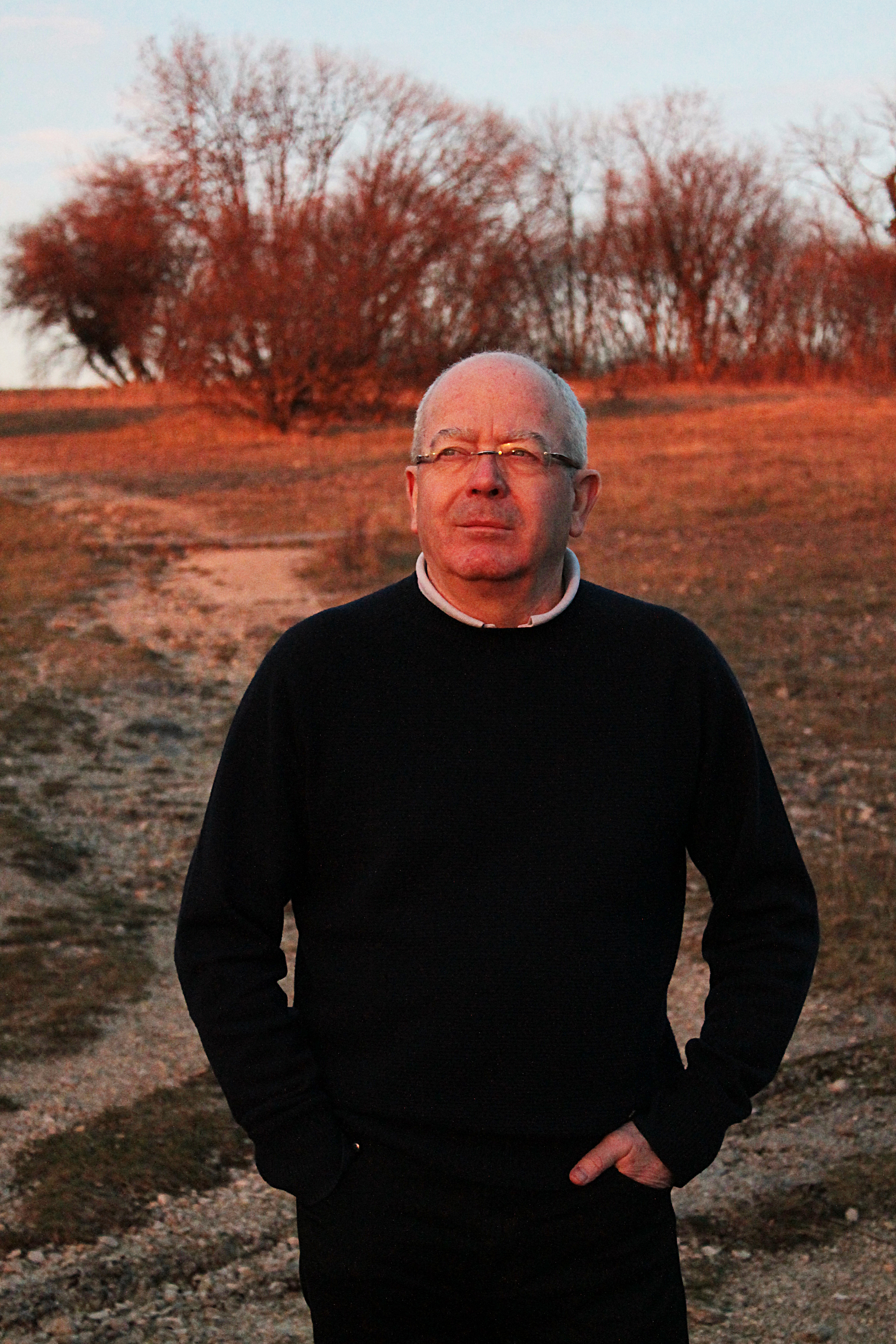
Yves Ravey

Yves Ravey (born 1953 in Besançon) is a French novelist and playwright. Among his notable works is the novel Le Drap, which won the Prix Marcel-Aymé in 2004. Ravey received the Prix Renfer in 2011.

== Selected works ==
- La Table des singes (Gallimard, 1989).
- Bureau des illettrés (Minuit, 1992).
- Le Cours classique (Minuit, 1995).
- Alerte (Minuit, 1996).
- Moteur (Minuit, 1996).
- Le drap (Minuit, 2003).
- Pris au piège (Minuit, 2005).
- L'Épave (Minuit, 2006).
- Bambi Bar (Minuit, 2008).
- Cutter (Minuit, 2009).
- Enlèvement avec rançon (Minuit, 2010).
- Un notaire peu ordinaire (Minuit, 2013).
