= Jean-Louis Bauer =

French actor and playwright (1952–2022)

- Born: 1 June 1952; Paris, France
- Died: 30 September 2022 (aged 70); Paris, France
- Education: National School of Arts and Techniques of Theater
- Occupations: Actor; Playwright

Jean-Louis Bauer (1 June 1952 – 30 September 2022) was a French actor and playwright.

== Biography ==
Bauer studied at the National School of Arts and Techniques of Theater and played roles on the stage and on television. He also wrote plays for France Inter and France Culture. In particular, he wrote the play L'Affaire with Philippe Adrien, as well as Le Roman d'un trader, which was inspired by the life of Jérôme Kerviel. Aided by director Daniel Benoin, he presented the latter play with Lorànt Deutsch as the lead actor. The piece was adapted into cinema by Christophe Barratier with Arthur Dupont in the role of Jérôme Kerviel. In 1997, he received the Prix SACD for new theatre talent.

Jean-Louis Bauer died in Paris on 30 September 2022 at the age of 70.

== Filmography ==
=== Cinema ===
- Stella (1983)
- Contes clandestins (1985)
- Le Contretemps (2009)

=== Television ===
- Le Pain noir (1974)
- L'Équipage (1978)
- Médecins de nuit (1978)
- Messieurs les jurés (1981)
- La Vie telle qu'elle change (1984)
