= Philippe Chevallier (actor) =

French comedian and actor

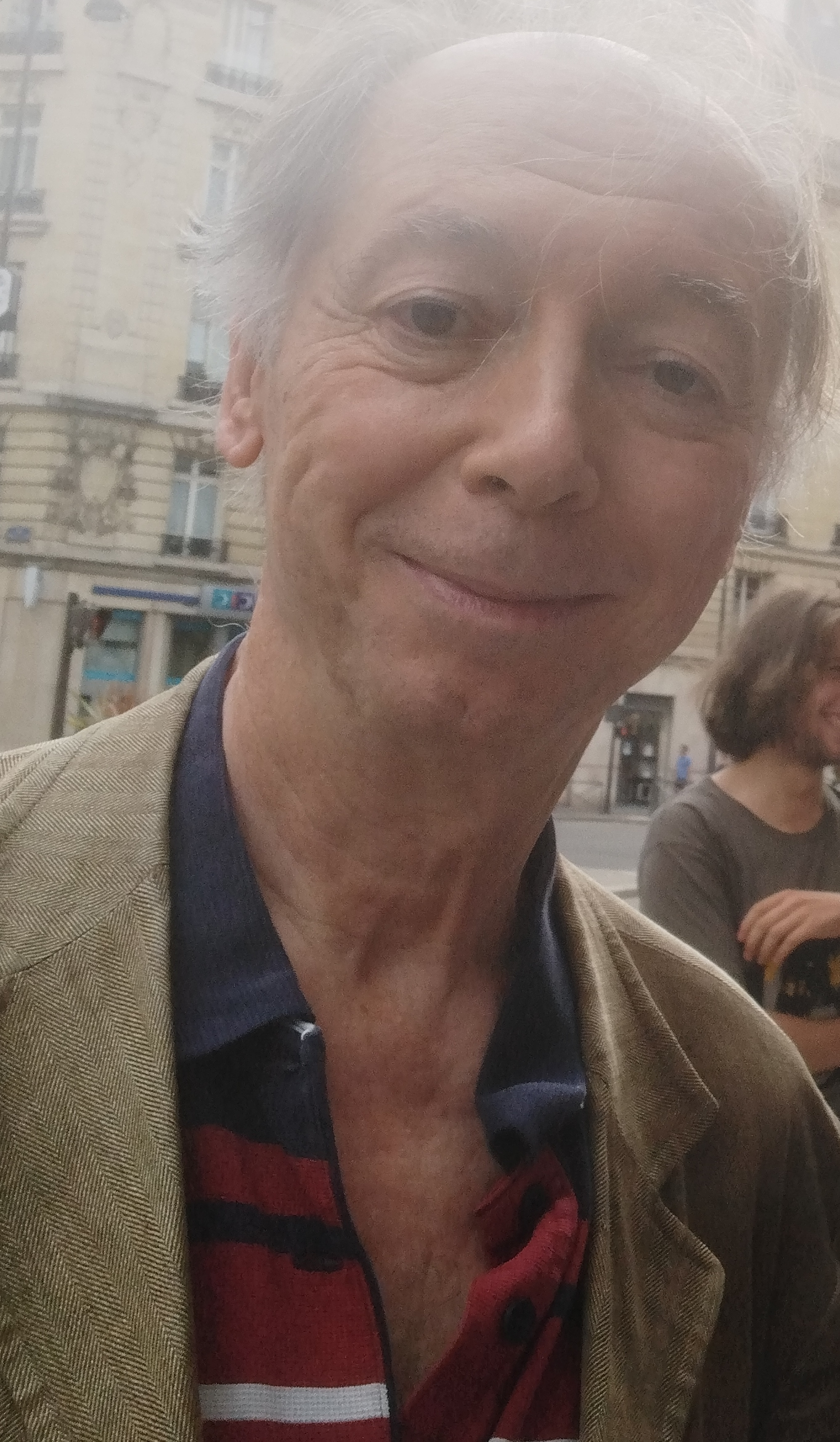
- Chevallier in 2023
- Born: 11 January 1956 (age 70); Redon, Ille-et-Vilaine, France
- Occupations: Comedian and actor
- Years active: 1994 -

Philippe Chevallier (born 11 January 1956 in Redon) is a French comedian and actor best known for his collaboration with Régis Laspalès.

In 2002 he starred in Ma femme s'appelle Maurice.

== Filmography ==
- 1994 : Tête à tête by Jean-Hugues Lime
- 1997 : Le Pari by Didier Bourdon and Bernard Campan
- 1998 : Ca n'empêche pas les sentiments by Jean-Pierre Jackson
- 2000 : Antilles sur Seine by Pascal Légitimus
- 2004 : Les Gaous by Igor SK
- 2002 : Ma femme s'appelle Maurice by Jean-Marie Poiré
- 2004 : Tu vas rire mais je te quitte by Philippe Harel
- 2014 : Brèves de comptoir by Jean-Michel Ribes
