= One-Way (novel) =

1994 novel by Didier Van Cauwelaert

- Author: Didier Van Cauwelaert
- Original title: Un aller simple
- Language: French
- Publisher: Éditions Albin Michel
- Publication date: 26 August 1994
- Publication place: France

One-Way (French: Un aller simple) is a 1994 novel by the French writer Didier Van Cauwelaert. It received the Prix Goncourt. It was adapted by Van Cauwelaert into the 2001 film Un aller simple, directed by Laurent Heynemann.

== See also ==
- 1994 in literature
- Contemporary French literature
