= André Clavé =

French actor, director, and Resistance fighter

André Clavé (1916–1981) was a French actor, director, theater director and Resistance fighter, deported during the Second World war, in the concentration camps of Buchenwald and of Dora.

« Le témoignage du talent est bien sommaire, seul le message humain est important. »

— André Clavé

« The expression of the talent is too basic, alone the human message is important »

— André Clavé

== Bibliography ==
- Francine Galliard-Risler, André Clavé : Théâtre et Résistance – Utopies et Réalités, A.A.A.C., Paris, 1998 – Ouvrage collectif écrit et dirigé par FGR, avec de très nombreux témoignages enregistrés et retranscrits – Préface de Jean-Noël Jeanneney - Épilogue de Pierre Schaeffer
- André Sellier, Histoire du camp de Dora, éditions de La Découverte, Paris, 1998
- Pierre Sudreau, Au-delà de toutes les frontières, 1991; 2è édition complétée : éditions Odile Jacob, 2002
- Pierre Saint-Macary, Mauthausen : percer l'oubli, éditions de L'Harmattan, coll. Mémoires du XXè siècle, Paris 2003
- Francine Galliard-Risler, Dora-Harzungen, la marche de la mort, Éditions Alan Sutton, St-Cyr-sur-Loire, 2005 – Ouvrage collectif dirigé par FGR – Préface de Pierre Sudreau – Introduction d’Alfred Jahn – Témoignages d'André Clavé, de René Haenjens, Wolf Wexler, préface de Pierre Sudreau, Jean Mialet – Évocation du réseau Brutus de la Résistance intérieure française; ouvrage traduit et publié en Allemagne en 2015 sous le titre Todesmarsch in die Freiheit
- Francine Galliard-Risler, Todesmarsch in die Freiheit - durch den Harz, Iatros Verlag, 2015 – Traduction de Dora-Harzungen, la marche de la mort de FGR, 2005, traductrices (Überstzung) Helga Dahl-Dupont et Isabelle George
- Jocelyne Tournet-Lammer, Sur les traces de Pierre Schaeffer. Archives 1942-1995, avec des illustrations de Francine Galliard-Risler, Paris, Ina, La Documentation française, coll. « Fenêtre sur les archives de l’Ina », 2006
- Jean-Marc Binot et Bernard Boyer, Nom de code : Brutus. Histoire d'un réseau de la France libre, Fayard, 2007

== See also ==
- André Clavé on the French Wikipedia
- Francine Galliard-Risler on the French Wikipedia
