= Didier Van Cauwelaert =

French author of Belgian descent (born 1960)

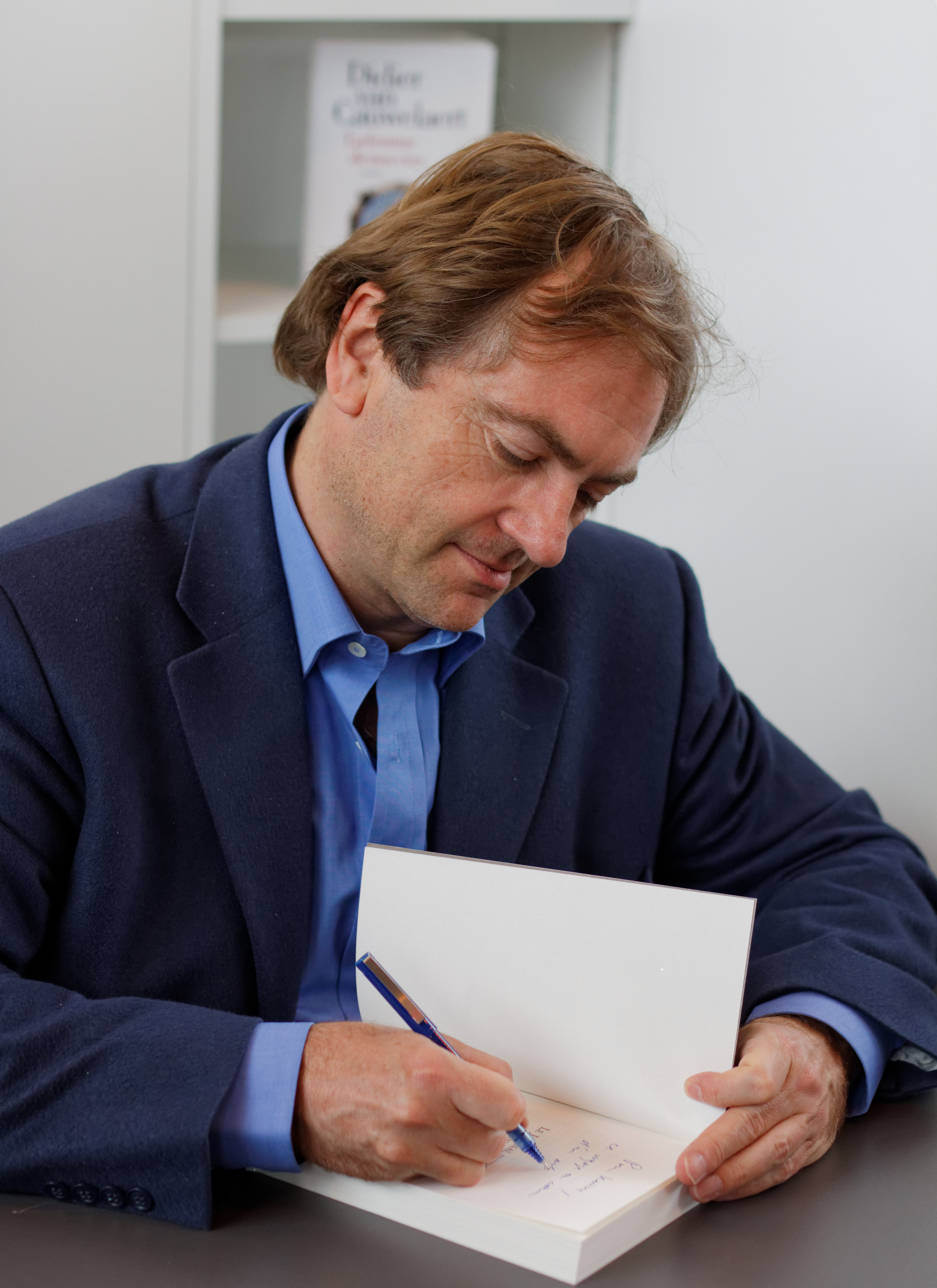
2013

Didier Van Cauwelaert (French pronunciation: [didje vɑ̃ kovlaʁt]; born 29 July 1960) is a French author and director of Belgian descent who was born in Nice. In 1994 his novel Un Aller simple won the Prix Goncourt.

In 1997 he was awarded the Grand prix du théâtre de l’Académie française.

== Works ==
- Vingt ans et des poussières (1982)
- Poisson d'amour (1984)
- Les vacances du fantôme (1986)
- L'orange amère (1988)
- Un objet en souffrance (1991)
- Cheyenne (1993)
- Un aller simple (1994) / One-Way (2003)
- La vie interdite (1997)
- Corps étranger (1998)
- La demi-pensionnaire (1999)
- L'éducation d'une fée (2000)
- L'Apparition (2001)
- Rencontre sous X (2002)
- Amour (2002)
- Hors de moi / Out of My Head (2003), used as the basis for the 2011 motion picture Unknown.
- L'évangile de Jimmy (2004)
- Attirances (2005)
- Cloner le Christ ? (2005)
- Le père adopté (2007)
- La nuit dernière au XVe siècle (2008)
- Les témoins de la mariée (2010)
- Le journal intime d'un arbre (2011)
- La femme de nos vies (2013)
- Le Principe de Pauline (2014)
- Jules (2015)
- On dirait nous (2016)
- Le Retour de Jules (2017)
- J'ai perdu Albert (2018)
- La personne de confiance (2019)
- L'inconnue du 17 mars (2020)
- Le pouvoir des animaux (2021)
- L'insolence des miracles (2023)

== Filmography ==
- 1992: My Wife's Girlfriends
- 2018: J'ai perdu Albert
