= Laurent Heynemann =

French film director, screenwriter (born 1948)

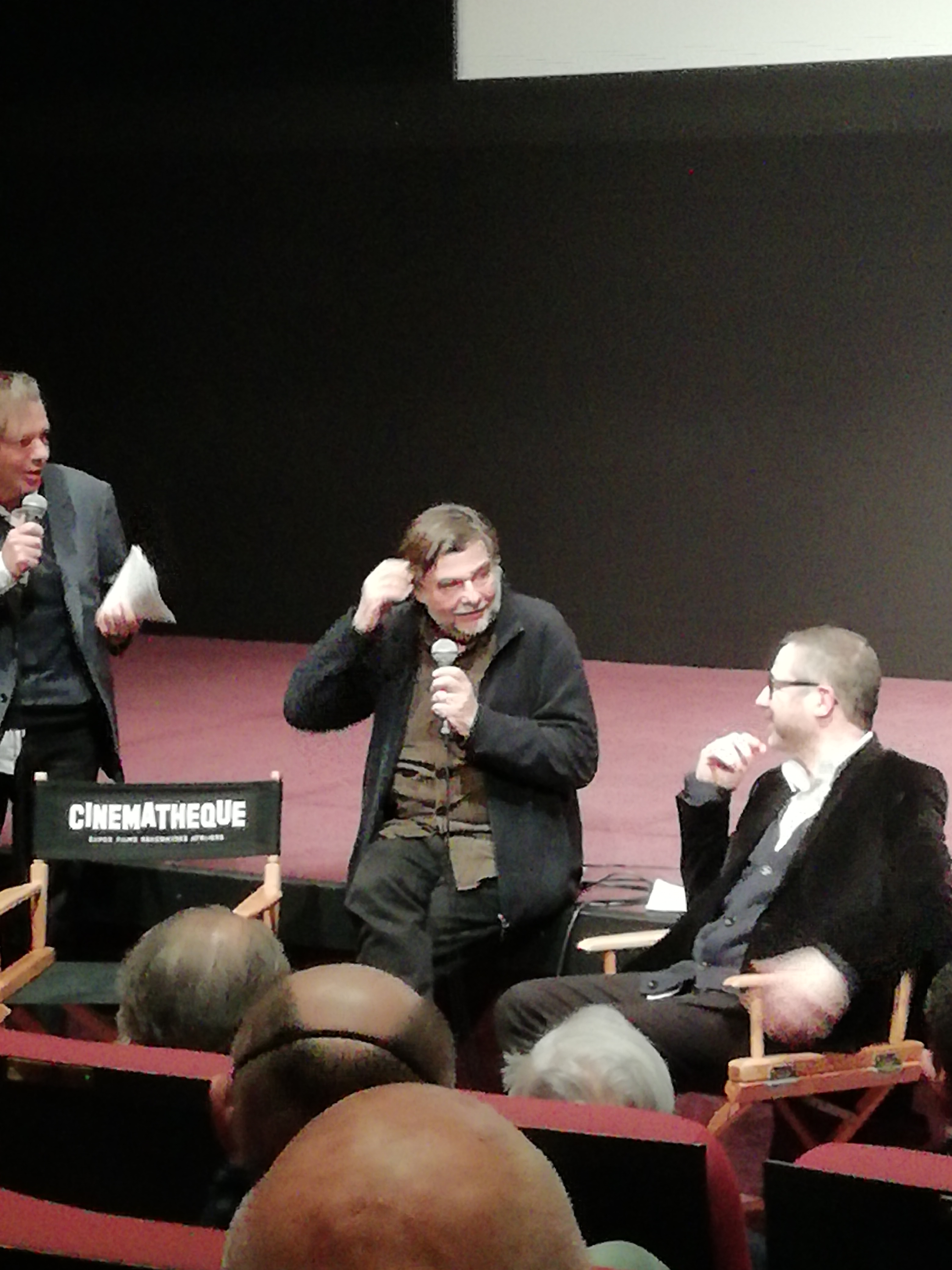
- Laurent Heynemann, 2022
- Born: Laurent Louis Heynemann; 9 November 1948 (age 77); Paris, France
- Occupations: Film director, screenwriter
- Spouse(s): Caroline Huppert (divorced), Marion Monestier
- Children: 2
- Awards: Commander of the Ordre des Arts et des Lettres (2010); Knight of the Legion of Honour (2011)

Laurent Heyneman (born 9 November 1948) is a French film director and screenwriter for film and television. Many of his films cover political subjects.

== Life and career ==
Laurent Heynemann was born on 9 November 1948, in Paris, into a Jewish family. He was an assistant in his early career to film directors Bertrand Tavernier, Yves Boisset, and Michel Mitrani.

He was married to film director Caroline Huppert, and they have two children.

Heynemann directed René Bousquet, or The Grand Arrangement (2007), a made for television film about the French police chief Rene Bousquet. He also directed A Man of Honor, a film about politician Pierre Bérégovoy. His film Un aller simple (One Way Ticket; 2001) was adapted from the novel of the same name by Didier Van Cauwelaert, and addresses integration, immigration, and racism. The 2019 film An Irrepressible Woman was about a woman who leaves her husband to marry a man at the Buchenwald concentration camp in Germany.

Heynemann was awarded title of Commander (Commandeur) of the Ordre des Arts et des Lettres in 2010 and, a year later in 2011, that of Knight (Chevalier) of the Legion of Honour.

== Filmography ==
=== Film ===
- The Question (1977); an adaptation of the book La Question (1958) by Henri Alleg
- Le Mors aux Dents (The Bit Between the Teeth; 1979)
- Birgitt Haas Must Be Killed (1981)
- Stella (1983 film) (1983)
- Les Mois d'Avril sont meurtriers (1987)
- Faux et Usage de Faux (1990)
- The Old Lady Who Walked in the Sea (1991)
- Un aller simple (One Way Ticket; 2001)
- An Irrepressible Woman (2019)

=== Television ===
- Le Dernier Civil (1984), television series based on the Ernst Glaeser book, The Last Civilian
- René Bousquet, or The Grand Arrangement (2007); made for television film
- La Rupture (2013 film) (2013); made for television film
- Laval, Le Collaborateur (or Pierre Laval, The Collaborator; 2022); made for television film
