= Raffy Shart =

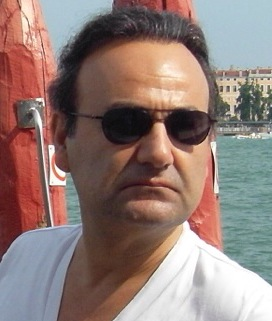
- Born: France
- Occupations: Theater director Film director Screenwriter; Songwriter
- Years active: 1997-present

Raffy Shart is a French-Armenian theater director and writer, film director and screenwriter, and composer / songwriter. In addition, Raffy Shart is an organizer of shows, does advertising campaigns, directs ads and music videos, writes musical scores for films, and is a songwriter for various artists, and has a number of children's songs.

Raffy Shart, of Armenian origin, was known as writer of the French stage play Ma femme s'appelle Maurice with Philippe Chevallier et Régis Laspalès.in 1997. The play was shown in more than 44 countries. He gained further fame through co-writing Quasimodo d'El Paris, directed in 1999 by Patrick Timsit as a comedic adaptation of the 1831 novel The Hunchback of Notre-Dame by Victor Hugo.

In 2006, Raffy Shart directed himself Incontrôlable with Michaël Youn, Thierry Lhermitte, Patrick Timsit et Hélène de Fougerolles and is directing the play Attache-moi au radiateur.

== Filmography ==
=== Directing ===
- 2006: Incontrôlable

=== Screenwriter ===
- 1992: Armen and Bullik (TV movie)
- 1999: Quasimodo d'El Paris
- 2002: Ma femme s'appelle Maurice (English title: My Wife's Name Is Maurice)
- 2006: Incontrôlable

=== Actor ===
- 1999: Quasimodo d'El Paris as Man with a Hat
- 2002: Quelqu'un de bien as a flower shop owner
