= Jean-Marie Gourio =

French novelist, humorist and screenwriter

Jean-Marie Gourio (born 1956) is a French novelist, humorist and screenwriter. He was born in Nérac, Lot-et-Garonne. He won early fame for his column Brèves de comptoir, published in the satirical magazine Hara-Kiri. Compilations of the columns were published annually, and even adapted for the stage.

Gourio has written several novels, starting with his debut novel Autopsie d’un nain (1987). His 1998 novel Chut! was widely praised and won several literary prizes.

== Cinema ==
Some of his book had been adapted into film.

- 2005 : La vie est à nous !, directed by Gérard Krawczyk (adapted from L'eau des fleurs

In 2014, he write the screenplay of Brèves de comptoir with Jean-Michel Ribes.
