= Jean-Michel Ribes =

French actor, playwright, screenwriter, theatre and film director

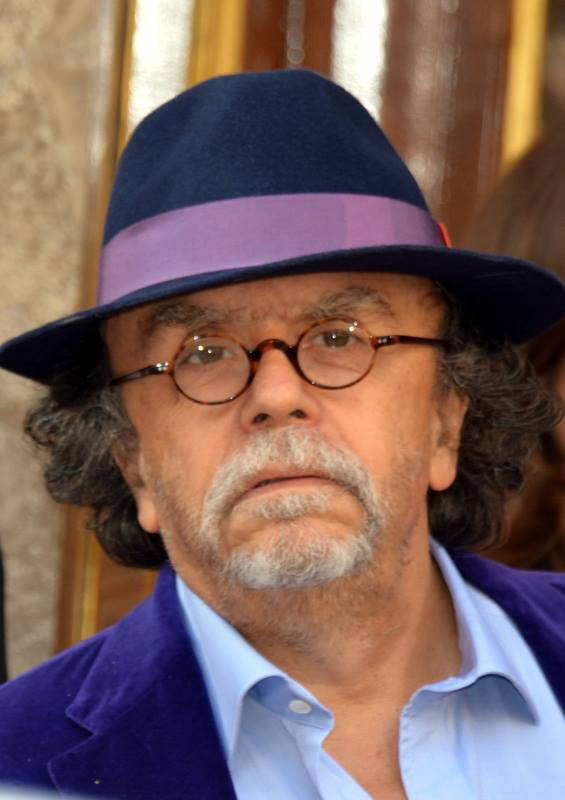
- Jean-Michel Ribes during the 2014 Molière Award
- Born: Jean-Michel Pierre Fernand Ribes; 15 December 1946 (age 78); Paris, France
- Occupation(s): Playwright, screen writer, film director, theatre director
- Years active: 1966–present

Jean-Michel Ribes (born 15 December 1946, in Paris) is a French playwright, screenwriter, theatre director, film maker and actor. Since 2002 he has been the managing director of the Théâtre du Rond-Point.

Between 1982 and 1984 Ribes had directed Merci Bernard and since 1988 works on Palace. In 2008, Ribes had directed Batailles which he co-wrote with Roland Topor and next year became a director of the Un garçon impossible, a play by Petter S. Rosenlund and Roland Dubillard's's Les Diablogues. In 2010, in Théâtre du Rond-Point he directed Les Nouvelles Brèves de Comptoir in which Jean-Marie Gourio had starred. In 2011, he wrote and directed René l’énervé - Opéra bouffe et tumultueux, on the music by Reinhardt Wagner. A year later, he returned to Théâtre du Rond-Point at which he directed play Théâtre sans animaux and Sébastien Thiéry's L’Origine du Monde in 2013.

== Theater ==
Year	Title	Author	Notes
1966	Chez l'illustre écrivain	Octave Mirbeau	
1966	Je rêvais peut-être	Luigi Pirandello	
1967	The Alchemist	Ben Jonson	
1967	Herman est de retour	Anonymous	
1969	Le lai de Barrabas	Fernando Arrabal	
1970	Les Fraises musclées	Jean-Michel Ribes	
1971	Il faut que le sycomore coule	Jean-Michel Ribes	
1972	Rumeurs	Jean-Michel Ribes	
1972	Je suis un steak	Jean-Michel Ribes	
1972	Par delà les marronniers	Jean-Michel Ribes	
1973	Les Fraises musclées	Jean-Michel Ribes	
1974	L'Odyssée pour une tasse de thé	Jean-Michel Ribes	
1975	Dieu le veut	Jean-Michel Ribes	
1975	Omphalos Hôtel	Jean-Michel Ribes	
1975	On loge la nuit-café à l'eau	Jean-Michel Ribes	
1976	Tout contre un petit bois	Jean-Michel Ribes	
1977	Jacky Parady	Jean-Michel Ribes	
1983	Batailles	Jean-Michel Ribes	
1984	True West	Sam Shepard	
1986	Révoltes	Jean-Michel Ribes	
1987	Le pont des soupirs	Jacques Offenbach	Nominated – Molière Award for Best Musical
1987	The Birthday Party	Harold Pinter	
1988	La Cagnotte	Eugène Labiche	
1990	La Cuisse du steward	Jean-Michel Ribes	
1994	Brèves de comptoir	Jean-Marie Gourio	Nominated – Molière Award for Best Director; Nominated – Molière Award for Best Comedy
1994	Cirque à deux	Barry Creyton	
1997	Monsieur Monde	Jean-Michel Ribes	
1998	Rêver peut-être	Jean-Claude Grumberg	Nominated – Molière Award for Best Director; Nominated – Molière Award for Best Creation; Grand Prix de la critique – Best French Creation
1998	Les Talons devant	Patrick Bosso & Jean-Michel Ribes	
1999	Les Nouvelles Brèves de comptoir	Jean-Marie Gourio	Nominated – Molière Award for Best Comedy
1999	Teddy	Jean-Louis Bourdon	
2000	Jeffrey Bernard Is Unwell	Keith Waterhouse	
2000	Amorphe d'Ottenburg	Jean-Claude Grumberg	
2001	Théâtre sans animaux	Jean-Michel Ribes	Molière Award for Best Comedy; Molière Award for Best Playwright; Grand Prix du Théâtre de l’Académie française Nominated – Molière Award for Best Creation
2002	L'Enfant do	Jean-Claude Grumberg	
2002	Le Complexe de Thénardier	José Pliya	
2002	La Priapée des écrevisses	Christian Siméon	
2003	Le professeur Rollin a encore quelque chose à dire	François Rollin	
2003	Guy Bedos	Guy Bedos, Nicolas Bedos & Gérard Miller	
2004	Musée haut, musée bas	Jean-Michel Ribes	Nominated – Molière Award for Best Living Francophone Author; Nominated – Molière Award for Best Creation
2004	Le Jardin aux betteraves	Roland Dubillard	
2005	Merci	Daniel Pennac	
2005	Dieu est un steward de bonne composition	Yves Ravey	
2005	Sans ascenseur	Sébastien Thiéry	
2006	Collection particulière	François Morel	
2007	J'ai tout	Thierry Illouz	
2008	La Ferme des concombres	Patrick Robine	
2008	Batailles	Jean-Michel Ribes	
2009	En umulig gutt	Petter S. Rosenlund	
2009	Les Diablogues	Roland Dubillard	
2010	Les Nouvelles Brèves de comptoir	Jean-Marie Gourio & Jean-Michel Ribes	
2011	René l'énervé	Jean-Michel Ribes	
2013	Théâtre sans animaux	Jean-Michel Ribes	
2016	Par-delà les marronniers	Jean-Michel Ribes	

== Filmography ==
- 1978: The Swindle
- 1986: La galette du roi
- 1993: Chacun pour toi
- 2008: The Maiden and the Wolves
- 2008: A Day at the Museum
- 2014: Brèves de comptoir

== Awards ==
- 2001: Plaisir du Théâtre Award
- 2007: Chevalier (Knight) of the Légion d'honneur
