= Olivier Broche =

French actor, film producer

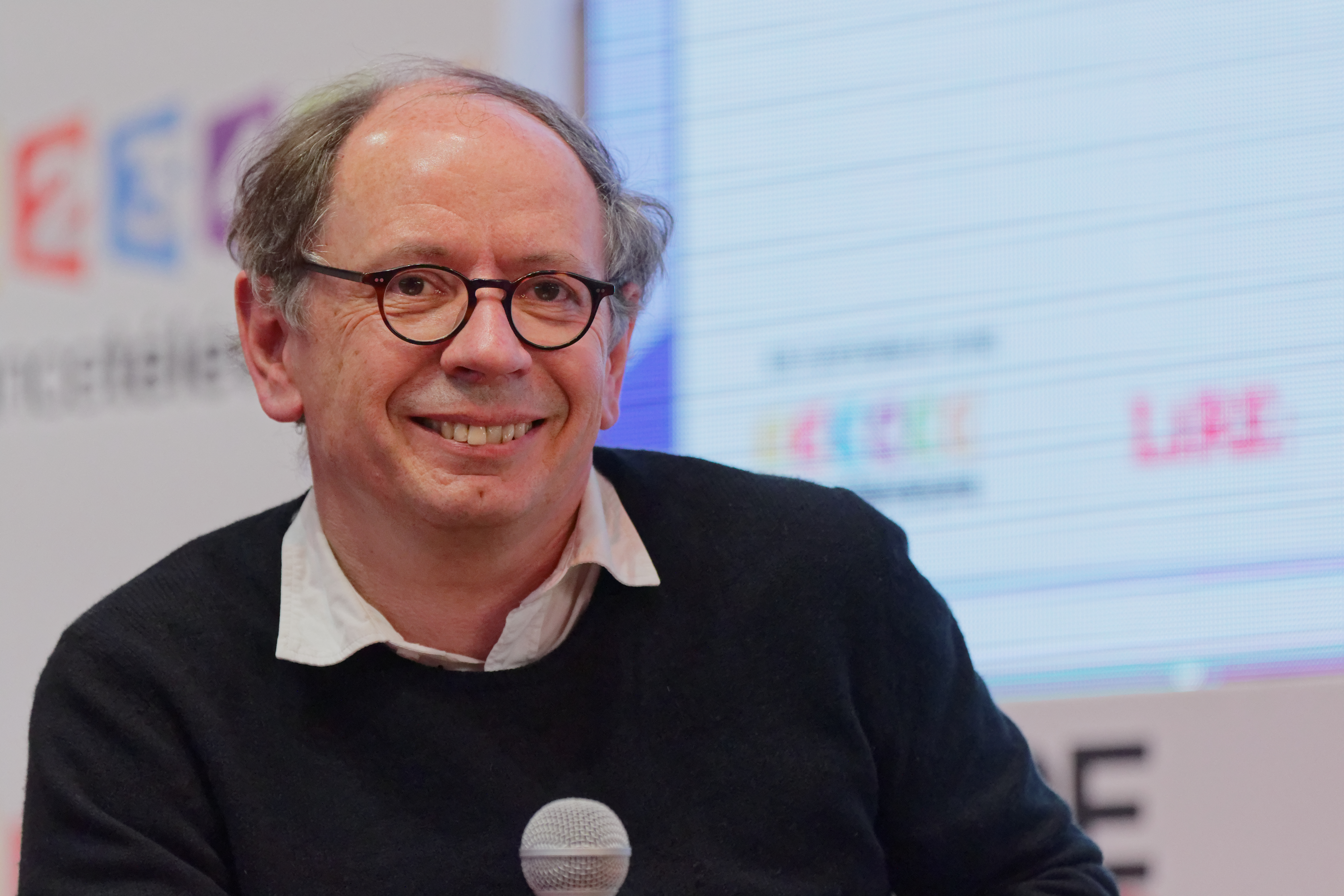
- Olivier Broche Portrait
- Born: 18 December 1963 (age 62); Paris, France
- Occupations: Actor, Comedian, Producer
- Years active: 1986–present

Olivier Broche (born 18 December 1963) is a French actor and producer. He is best known for playing in the cult TV series Les Deschiens (1993–2002), in which he plays alongside Yolande Moreau.

== Filmography ==
Year	Title	Role	Director	Notes
1986	Le torero hallucinogène		Stéphane Clavier	Short
1987	Le panorama		Christophe Loizillon	Short
1991	Sushi Sushi		Laurent Perrin	
1992	Riens du tout	Lefèvre	Cédric Klapisch	
1992	Les mamies	The nephew	Annick Lanoë	
1992	Les yeux menteurs du jour		Pierre Le Bret	Short
1993	Regards d'enfance	Employee SPA	Pierre Lary	TV series (1 episode)
1993	L'homme dans la nuit		Claude Boissol	TV movie
1993	Lettre pour L...		Romain Goupil	
1993	Les mercredis de la vie	Floppy's framework	Denis Rabaglia	TV series (1 episode)
1993	Chambre froide	Paulin	Sylvain Madigan	TV movie
1993-2002	Les Deschiens	The son	Jérôme Deschamps & Macha Makeïeff	TV series
1995	...à la campagne		Manuel Poirier	
1995	Luc et Marie	The intern	Philippe Boon & Laurent Brandenbourger	Short
1996	Cubic		Thomas Chabrol	TV series
1996	Fantôme avec chauffeur	The funeral's employee	Gérard Oury	
1996	Capitaine au long cours	Le facteur	Bianca Conti Rossini	
1996	La Belle Verte	DDASS's man	Coline Serreau	
1996	Combats de femme	Deputy Mayor	Pascale Bailly	TV series (1 episode)
1999	Merci mon chien	Pierre-Ange	Philippe Galland	
1999	Le voyage à Paris	Daniel Dubosc	Marc-Henri Dufresne	
2000	Vertiges	Miller	Aruna Villiers	TV series (1 episode)
2001	Madonna à Lourdes		Arnaud Larrieu & Jean-Marie Larrieu	Short
2001	Les rencontres de Joëlle	The perfect son	Patrick Poubel	TV movie
2002	Maigret	Piquemal	Christian de Chalonge	TV series (1 episode)
2002	The Truth About Charlie	Aznavour Fan	Jonathan Demme	
2002	La vie est à moi	The father	Emmanuel Broche & Olivier Broche	Director & writer Short
2003	Bienvenue au gîte	A guest	Claude Duty	
2004	Madame Édouard	Bornéo	Nadine Monfils	
2004	Quand la mer se retire	The Normand	Laurent Heynemann	TV movie
2005	Vénus & Apollon		Jean-Marc Vervoort	TV series (1 episode)
2005	Cindy: The Doll Is Mine	Producer	Bertrand Bonello	Short
2005	Non	Producer	Laurence Ferreira Barbosa	Short
2006	Du jour au lendemain	Jean-François Robert	Philippe Le Guay	
2006	Mes parents chéris	Yves	Philomène Esposito	TV movie
2006	Les signes	Producer	Eugène Green	Short
2007	Mort vivant	Jacques Dugain	Laurent de Vismes	Short
2008	Marie et Madeleine	Richard Manceaux	Joyce Buñuel	TV movie
2008-2010	Les Bougon	Mononc	Sam Karmann, Michel Hassan & Christian Merret-Palmair	TV series (8 episodes)
2009	L'absence	The visitor	Cyril de Gasperis	
2010	Camus	Jean-Paul Sartre	Laurent Jaoui	TV movie
2010	La très excellente et divertissante histoire de François Rabelais	Books brother	Hervé Baslé	TV movie
2010	Les Bleus	Cyrille Vauquier	Olivier Barma	TV series (1 episode)
2010	L'uzine, oula vengeance de Mr. Staach		Diologent Nicolas	Short
2011	Chez Maupassant	Monsieur Follenvie	Philippe Bérenger	TV series (1 episode)
2011	The Rabbi's Cat	The parrot	Antoine Delesvaux & Joann Sfar	Voice
2011	L'élève Ducobu	The school inspector	Philippe de Chauveron	
2011	La peinture à l'huile		Claude Duty (2)	Short
2012	Merlin	Razmok	Stéphane Kappes	TV mini-series
2013	Le temps de l'aventure	The theater's administrator	Jérôme Bonnell	
2013	100% cachemire	Man in couple	Valérie Lemercier	
2014	Zouzou	Jean-Claude Rabette	Blandine Lenoir	
2015	All About Them	Depressive warned	Jérôme Bonnell (2)	
2015	L'élan	Olivier Petiot	Etienne Labroue	
2016	Sur le plancher des vaches	Employé CAF / Médecin	Fabrice Tempo	
2016	The Girl Without Hands	The Father	Sébastien Laudenbach	Voice
2016	L'idéal		Frédéric Beigbeder	
2017	Bad Buzz	Philippe	Stéphane Kazandjian	
2017	Darkest Hour	Reynaud	Joe Wright	
2018	Place publique	Titi	Agnès Jaoui	
2019	Les parfums	Bourigault	Grégory Magne	

== On Stage ==
Year	Title	Writer	Director	Notes
1986	Egarements	François Levesque	Axelle Farwagi	
1987	Les Fourberies de Scapin	Molière	Stéphan Wojtowicz	
1988	Feu la mère de Madame	Georges Feydeau	Stéphan Wojtowicz	
1989	Lapin chasseur	Jérôme Deschamps & Macha Makeïeff	Jérôme Deschamps & Macha Makeïeff	Théâtre national de Chaillot
1991	La Veuve	Pierre Corneille	Christian Rist	Théâtre de l'Athénée
1992	Le Grand Ordinaire	Macha Makeieff	Macha Makeieff	
1993	Les brigands	Jacques Offenbach	Jérôme Deschamps & Macha Makeïeff	
1994	La Journée du Maire	Isabelle Philippe	Jean-François Philippe	
1994	Le Petit Tailleur	Tibor Harsányi	Jean-Marc Talbot & Olivier Saladin	
1995	Adrien, les mémoires	François Morel	Christophe Loizillon	
1996	Le Défilé	Jérôme Deschamps & Macha Makeïeff	Jérôme Deschamps & Macha Makeïeff	
1997	Les Précieuses ridicules	Molière	Jérôme Deschamps & Macha Makeïeff	Odéon-Théâtre de l'Europe
2011-2012	Instants critiques	François Morel	François Morel	Place des Célestins
2013	Le Bourgeon	Georges Feydeau	Nathalie Grauwin	Théâtre de l'Ouest parisien
2015	L'Or et la Paille	Pierre Barillet & Jean-Pierre Gredy	Jeanne Herry	Théâtre de l'Ouest parisien
