= Olivier Saladin =

French actor

- Born: 1 May 1952 (age 74); Le Havre, France
- Occupations: Actor, Comedian
- Years active: 1982–present

Olivier Saladin is a French actor.

== Career ==
He is best known for playing in the cult TV series Les Deschiens (1993–2002), in which he plays alongside Yolande Moreau.

== Theater ==
Year	Title	Author	Director
1982	14-18	Alain Bezu	Alain Bezu
1984	La Galerie du Palais	Pierre Corneille	Alain Bezu
1984-1985	Mélite	Pierre Corneille	Alain Bezu
1984-1985	L'Enfant	Jules Vallès	Catherine Delattres & Alain Van Der Malière
1985	La Place royale	Pierre Corneille	Alain Bezu & Joseph Danan
1986-1987	La Lente agonie des grands rampants	Saintacher	Michel Bezu & Didier Mahieu
1987	La Nuit même	Joseph Danan	Alain Bezu
1987-1988	Les petits potages mécaniques	Catherine Delattres	Catherine Delattres
1989-1991	Lapin chasseur	Jérôme Deschamps & Macha Makeieff	Jérôme Deschamps & Macha Makeieff
1992-1993	Les pieds dans l'eau	Jérôme Deschamps & Macha Makeieff	Jérôme Deschamps & Macha Makeieff
1997	Les Précieuses ridicules	Molière	Jérôme Deschamps & Macha Makeieff
1999-2001	Les Pensionnaires	Jérôme Deschamps & Macha Makeieff	Jérôme Deschamps & Macha Makeieff
2000	Les Précieuses ridicules	Molière	Jérôme Deschamps & Macha Makeieff
2002	Un cœur attaché sous la lune	Serge Valletti	Bernard Lévy
2006	Violette sur la terre	Carole Fréchette	Maxime Leroux
2008	Gl'innamorati	Carlo Goldoni	Gloria Paris
2008-2009	Bien des Choses	François Morel	François Morel
2011-2014	Instants Critiques	François Morel & Olivier Broche	François Morel
2013	Bien des Choses	François Morel	François Morel
2014-2015	36 nulles de salon	Daniel Cabanis	Jacques Bonnaffé
2015-2017	Ancien malade des hôpitaux de Paris	Daniel Pennac	Benjamin Guillard
2019	Welcome	Fabrice Thibaud	Jean-Michel Guérin & Fabrice Thibaud
2019-2021	Tout le monde ne peut pas être orphelin	Jean-Christophe Meurisse	Jean-Christophe Meurisse

== Filmography ==
Year	Title	Role	Director	Notes
1986	Quai du blues	Pierre	Jean Maley	TV movie
1987	Il est génial papy!	The waiter	Michel Drach	
1987	L'heure Simenon	François	Fabrice Cazeneuve	TV series (1 episode)
1988	Les enquêtes du commissaire Maigret	The watchman	Philippe Laïk	TV series (1 episode)
1990	Tatie Danielle	The butcher	Étienne Chatiliez	
1990	Docteur Petiot	The first agent	Christian de Chalonge	
1990	Feu sur le candidat	Taxi driver	Agnès Delarive	
1990-92	Imogène	Roger Bougrain	Thierry Chabert & Jean-Daniel Verhaeghe	TV series (2 episodes)
1991	La pagaille		Pascal Thomas	
1993	Lost in Transit	The restaurant manager	Philippe Lioret	
1993	Coup de jeune	The gas station attendant	Xavier Gélin	
1993	Son of the Shark		Agnès Merlet	
1993	Lucille et le photomaton		Sébastien Nuzzo	Short
1993	Nestor Burma		Claude Grinberg	TV series (1 episode)
1993	Regards d'enfance	Bank Manager	Olivier Langlois	TV series (1 episode)
1993-2002	Les Deschiens	Olivier Saladin	Jérôme Deschamps & Macha Makeïeff	TV series
1994	Colonel Chabert	Huré	Yves Angelo	
1994	Le dernier tour	Café owner	Thierry Chabert	TV movie
1994	Placé en garde à vue	Yvan le Jaouën	Bernard Uzan	TV series (1 episode)
1995	Fast	Christophe	Dante Desarthe	
1995	Élisa	Kevin	Jean Becker	
1995	Happiness Is in the Field	Car Showroom Customer	Étienne Chatiliez	
1996	Baloche	Technician Hens	Dominique Baron	TV movie
1996	Le garçon sur la colline	Bisson	Dominique Baron	TV movie
1998	Baldi	Vitale	Claude d'Anna	TV series (1 episode)
1999	Dessine-moi un jouet	Joseph Parroz	Hervé Baslé	TV movie
1999-2015	Boulevard du Palais	Doctor Pluvinage	Christian Bonnet, Thierry Petit, ...	TV series (54 episodes)
2000	L'enfant de la honte	Jules Letourneur	Claudio Tonetti	TV movie
2002	Le désert	The postman	Xavier Barthélemy	Short
2002	Moulin à paroles		Pascal Rémy	Short
2002	Division d'honneur	Paul	Jean-Marc Vervoort	TV movie
2002	Le Champ dolent, le roman de la terre	André Lamy	Hervé Baslé	TV mini-series
2002	Le grand patron	Pedro	Stéphane Kappes	TV series (1 episode)
2002	Avocats & associés	Bernard Chaumartin	Christian Bonnet	TV series (1 episode)
2002-04	S.O.S. 18	Inspector Joinville	Jacques Malaterre	TV series (3 episodes)
2003	Qui perd gagne!	The loto officer	Laurent Bénégui	
2003	Bienvenue au gîte	Father Robert	Claude Duty	
2003	Rien que du bonheur	Jean-Marc	Denis Parent	
2003	Welcome to the Roses	The neighbor	Francis Palluau	
2003	Sortie des artistes		José Fosse	Short
2003	La bastide bleue	Castellin	Benoît d'Aubert	TV movie
2003	Kelif et Deutsch à la recherche d'un emploi		Frédéric Berthe	TV series (1 episode)
2004	Les bottes	The physio	Renaud Bertrand	TV movie
2004	La nourrice	David	Renaud Bertrand	TV movie
2004	Courrier du coeur	Pascal Ledoux	Christian Faure	TV movie
2004	La vie est si courte		Hervé Baslé	TV movie
2005	Russian Dolls	Gérard	Cédric Klapisch	
2005	Angélus	The sound engineer	Stéphane Ballouhey	Short
2005	Zézette au Caniwash	M. Putel	Euric Allaire	Short
2005	A Love to Hide	Breton	Christian Faure	TV movie
2005	Le piège du Père Noël	Babou	Christian Faure	TV movie
2005	Spiral		Philippe Triboit	TV series (1 episode)
2005	Louis Page	Denis	Badreddine Mokrani	TV series (1 episode)
2005	Vénus & Apollon		Olivier Guignard	TV series (1 episode)
2005	Diane, femme flic	André Fabre	Étienne Dhaene	TV series (1 episode)
2006	The Poisoner	Auguste Leclerc	Christian Faure	TV movie
2006	Le Cri	Paloteau	Hervé Baslé	TV mini-series
2006	Commissaire Moulin	Peruz	Yves Rénier	TV series (1 episode)
2007	The Red Inn	The coachman	Gérard Krawczyk	
2007	La fille du chef	Monsieur Moulin	Sylvie Ayme	TV movie
2007	La promeneuse d'oiseaux	The projectionist	Jacques Otmezguine	TV movie
2008	Répercussions	Thomas Gauthier	Caroline Huppert	TV movie
2008-09	Camping paradis	André	Sylvie Ayme & Philippe Proteau	TV series (2 episodes)
2009	Réveil d'un mouton	M. Ronchard	Julien Paolini	Short
2009	Canicule de cheval		Stéphanie De Fenin	Short
2009	Looking for Steven Spielberg	Louis	Benjamin Guillard	Short
2010	La très excellente et divertissante histoire de François Rabelais	Brother Lessu	Hervé Baslé	TV movie
2011	La part des anges	Father Francis	Sylvain Monod	TV movie
2011	L'épervier	Lapipe	Stéphane Clavier	TV mini-series
2012	Véhicule école	The Minister	Benjamin Guillard	Short
2013	Chez nous c'est trois!	Eric Miremont	Claude Duty	
2014	Brèves de comptoir	Pulmoll	Jean-Michel Ribes	
2014	Asterix: The Mansions of the Gods	Senator Consensus	Louis Clichy & Alexandre Astier	
2014	La république des cru-cruneurs	The tailor	Gwenael Mulsant	Short
2016	Apnée	The father	Jean-Christophe Meurisse	
2016	L'Avenir est à nous		Benjamin Guillard	Short
2016	The law of Pauline	Lorrenzi	Philippe Venault	TV series (1 episode)
2017	Les brumes du souvenir	Alban Prevost	Sylvie Ayme	TV movie
2017	Bonaparte: La Campagne d'Egypte	Vivant Denon	Fabrice Hourlier	TV movie
2018	Asterix: The Secret of the Magic Potion	Senator Tomcrus	Louis Clichy & Alexandre Astier	
2020	Louloute	Dany	Hubert Viel	
2020	Peur sur le lac	Cécile's father	Jérôme Cornuau	TV mini-series
2021	Bloody Oranges	Olivier	Jean-Christophe Meurisse	
2021	Les voisins de mes voisins sont mes voisins	Picasso	Anne-Laure Daffis & Léo Marchand	
2021	Coups de Sang	Jean-Jacques	Christian Bonnet	TV movie
2021	La bonne conduite	Félix	Arnaud Bedouët	TV movie
2023	La plus belle pour aller danser	Henri	Victoria Bedos	
2024	Mort d'un berger	Cédric	Christian Bonnet	TV movie Post-Production
2024	Je ne me laisserai plus faire		Gustave Kervern	TV movie Post-Production
