= Bruno Lochet =

French actor

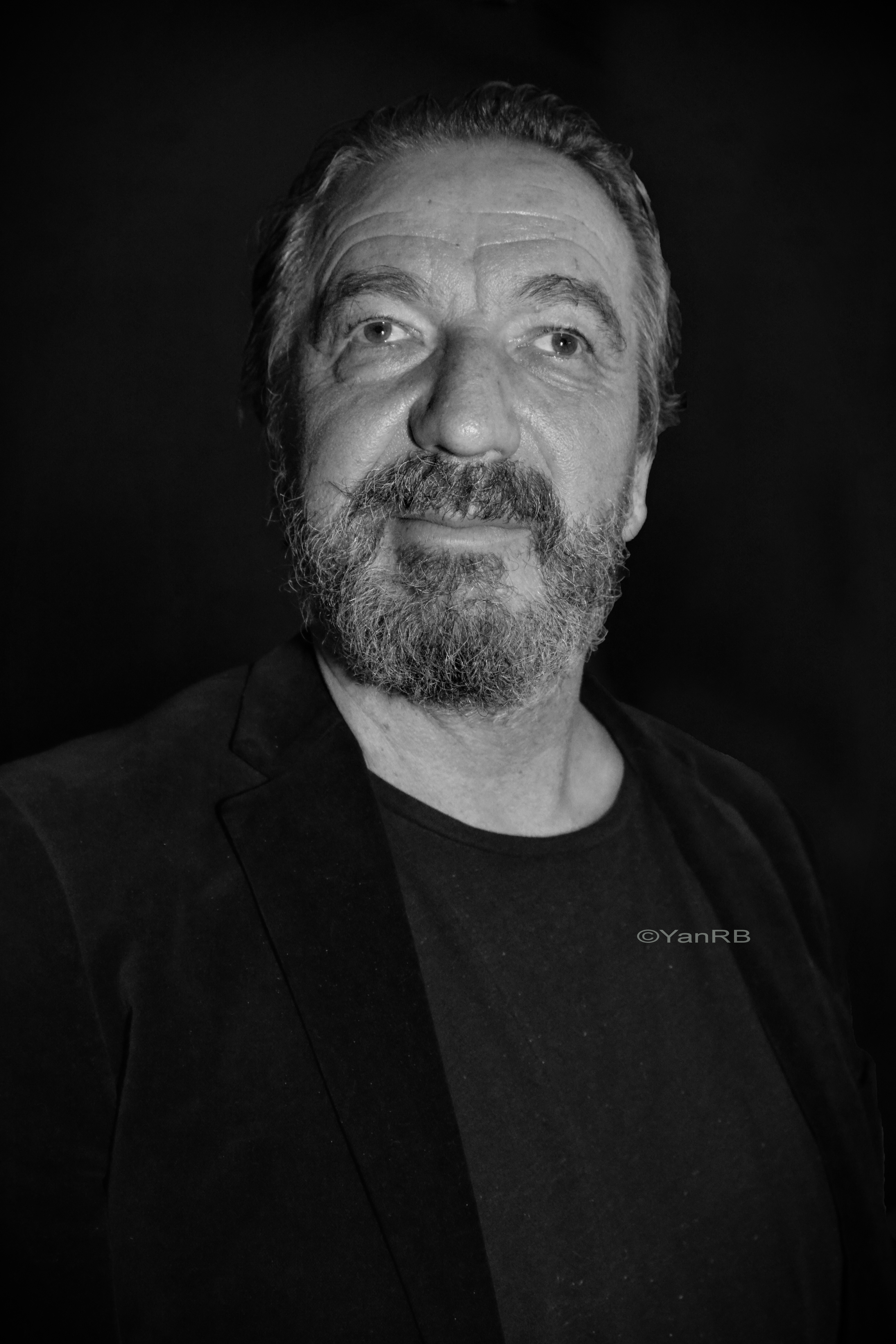
- Lochet in 2018
- Born: 18 October 1959 (age 66); Le Mans, France
- Occupations: Actor; comedian
- Years active: 1992–present

Bruno Lochet (born 18 October 1959) is a French actor. He is best known for playing in the cult TV series Les Deschiens (1993–2002), in which he played alongside Yolande Moreau.

== Theatre ==
| Year | Title | Author | Director |
|---|---|---|---|
| 1992-1993 | Les pieds dans l'eau | Jérôme Deschamps & Macha Makeieff | Jérôme Deschamps & Macha Makeieff |
| 1993-1994 | Les brigands | Jacques Offenbach | Jérôme Deschamps & Macha Makeieff |
| 1994-1996 | C'est magnifique | Jérôme Deschamps & Macha Makeieff | Jérôme Deschamps & Macha Makeieff |
| 1996-1997 | Le Défilé | Jérôme Deschamps & Macha Makeieff | Jérôme Deschamps & Macha Makeieff |
| 1997 | Les Précieuses ridicules | Molière | Jérôme Deschamps & Macha Makeieff |
| 2003-2004 | Judgement Day | Ödön von Horváth | André Engel |
| 2007 | Judgement Day | Ödön von Horváth | André Engel |

== Filmography ==
=== Cinema ===
| Year | Title | Role | Director | Notes |
|---|---|---|---|---|
| 1995 | The Three Brothers | PMU's owner | Didier Bourdon & Bernard Campan | |
| 1995 | Le poids du ciel | | Laurent Herbiet | Short |
| 1996 | Ligne de vie | | Pavel Lungin | |
| 1996 | Beaumarchais | The French jailer | Édouard Molinaro | |
| 1996 | L'échappée belle | Inspector Cambois | Étienne Dhaene | |
| 1996 | Départ immédiat | | Thomas Briat | Short |
| 1997 | J'ai horreur de l'amour | Costa | Laurence Ferreira Barbosa | |
| 1998 | Le poulpe | The cop | Guillaume Nicloux | |
| 1998 | La voie est libre | Diane's husband | Stéphane Clavier | |
| 1998 | Restons groupés | Gwenaël | Jean-Paul Salomé | |
| 1999 | One 4 All | The plumber | Claude Lelouch | |
| 1999 | Doggy Bag | Jojo | Frédéric Comtet | |
| 2000 | C.D.D. | | Olivier Loustau | Short |
| 2001 | Poetical Refugee | Franck | Abdellatif Kechiche | |
| 2001 | Tête brûlée | | Vincent Lebrun | Short |
| 2003 | La fin du règne animal | Noël | Joël Brisse | |
| 2003 | Sortie des artistes | | José Fosse | Short |
| 2004 | Ne quittez pas ! | The fellow-prisoner | Arthur Joffé | |
| 2004 | 3 Dancing Slaves | The father | Gaël Morel | |
| 2005 | Quartier V.I.P. | Michaud | Laurent Firode | |
| 2005 | Camping à la ferme | Bébert | Jean-Pierre Sinapi | |
| 2006 | The Colonel | Warrant Schmeck | Laurent Herbiet | |
| 2006 | Locked Out | M'Burunde | Albert Dupontel | |
| 2007 | Nos retrouvailles | The brewery regular | David Oelhoffen | |
| 2007 | The Secret of the Grain | Mario | Abdellatif Kechiche | |
| 2007 | Curriculum | Bernard Vatère | Alexandre Moix | Short |
| 2008 | Dante 01 | Bouddha | Marc Caro | |
| 2008 | Faciès | Monsieur Lecoq | Pascal Tessaud | Short |
| 2009 | Eden Is West | Yann | Costa-Gavras | |
| 2009 | A Man and His Dog | Jean-Pierre | Francis Huster | |
| 2009 | Mademoiselle Chambon | Jean's colleague | Stéphane Brizé | |
| 2009 | L'enfer | | Thierry Gracia | Short |
| 2009 | La boîte à Pépé | P'tit Louis | Sami Zitouni | Short |
| 2010 | Mumu | Saucisse | Joël Séria | |
| 2010 | Henry | Maurice | Kafka & Pascal Rémy | |
| 2010 | Potiche | André Ferron | François Ozon | |
| 2010 | Mammuth | The restaurant's client | Gustave Kervern & Benoît Delépine | |
| 2010 | Suite parlée | Pellets | Joël Brisse & Marie Vermillard | |
| 2010 | Wandering Streams | Gérard | Pascal Rabaté | |
| 2010 | Imogène McCarthery | Ted Boolitt | Alexandre Charlot & Franck Magnier | |
| 2010 | Je vous aime très beaucoup | Bastion | Philippe Locquet | |
| 2010 | L'étrangère | Patrick | Guillaume Foirest | Short |
| 2010 | Réflexion faite | The neighbor | Renaud Philipps | Short |
| 2011 | Nothing to Declare | Tiburce | Dany Boon | |
| 2012 | Stars 80 | Willy | Frédéric Forestier & Thomas Langmann | |
| 2012 | Nos plus belles vacances | Lucien Dufour | Philippe Lellouche | |
| 2013 | Pieces of Me | Bob | Nolwenn Lemesle | |
| 2013 | Les invincibles | Zézé | Frédéric Berthe | |
| 2013 | La grande boucle | Pierre Bojean | Laurent Tuel | |
| 2013 | La grosse bête | | Pierre-Luc Granjon | Short |
| 2014 | Aunt Hilda! | Turner | Benoît Chieux & Jacques-Rémy Girerd | |
| 2014 | Supercondriaque | The cop | Dany Boon | |
| 2014 | Nicholas on Holiday | M. Leguano | Laurent Tirard | |
| 2015 | Graziella | | Mehdi Charef | |
| 2015 | Le dernier voyage de l'énigmatique Paul WR | The gas station attendant | Romain Quirot | Short |
| 2016 | Five | Gérard | Igor Gotesman | |
| 2017 | Stars 80, la suite | Willy | Thomas Langmann | |
| 2018 | Comme des garçons | Alain Lambert | Julien Hallard | |
| 2018 | Les municipaux, ces héros | Michel | Les Chevaliers du fiel | |
| 2019 | Nos vies formidables | Pierre | Fabienne Godet | |
| 2019 | Les municipaux - Trop c'est trop | Michel | Les Chevaliers du fiel | |
| 2019 | La jeune fille et ses tocs | The bar owner | Lucie Plumet | Short |
| 2020 | Summer of 85 | Bernard | François Ozon | |
| 2021 | Mandibles | Gilles | Quentin Dupieux | |
| 2021 | Last Journey of Paul W.R. | César | Romain Quirot | |
| 2023 | Cash | Tonton | Jérémie Rozan | |
| 2023 | Apaches | Marius | Romain Quirot | |
| 2023 | L'astronaute | André Lavelle | Nicolas Giraud | |

=== Television ===
| Year | Title | Role | Director | Notes |
|---|---|---|---|---|
| 1993–2002 | Les Deschiens | Bruno | Jérôme Deschamps & Macha Makeïeff | TV series |
| 1995 | Lulu roi de France | Pierre | Bernard Uzan | TV movie |
| 1996 | Flairs ennemis | Mésange | Robin Davis | TV movie |
| 1996 | Chienne de vie | Boujut | Bernard Uzan | TV movie |
| 2001 | Tel épris | Fifi | Fabien Onteniente | TV movie |
| 2001 | Le divin enfant | Raymond | Stéphane Clavier | TV movie |
| 2001 | Les rencontres de Joëlle | François | Patrick Poubel | TV movie |
| 2001 | Caméra Café | Didier Farjex | Jean-Pierre Devilliers | TV series (1 episode) |
| 2002 | Le voyage organisé | Simplet | Alain Nahum | TV movie |
| 2002 | Femmes de loi | Gauthier | Denis Amar | TV series (1 episode) |
| 2003 | Les beaux jours | Albert | Jean-Pierre Sinapi | TV movie |
| 2003 | Une preuve d'amour | Bibi | Bernard Stora | TV movie |
| 2003 | La tranchée des espoirs | Ludwig Boehm | Jean-Louis Lorenzi | TV movie |
| 2003 | La crim' | M. Cassini | Jean-Pierre Prévost | TV series (1 episode) |
| 2003 | Louis Page | Virgile | Jean-Louis Lorenzi | TV series (1 episode) |
| 2004 | Nos vies rêvées | Michel Marant | Fabrice Cazeneuve | TV movie |
| 2004 | La vie est si courte | | Hervé Baslé | TV movie |
| 2004 | Le grand patron | Hervé Simmonet | Christian Bonnet | TV series (1 episode) |
| 2004 | Juliette Lesage, médecine pour tous | Serge Giraud | Christian François | TV series (1 episode) |
| 2005 | La famille Zappon | Théodore Vetter | Amar Arhab & Fabrice Michelin | TV movie |
| 2005 | Inséparables | Jacky | Élisabeth Rappeneau | TV series (1 episode) |
| 2006 | La pomme de Newton | André | Laurent Firode | TV movie |
| 2006 | Le Cri | Angelmon | Hervé Baslé | TV mini-series |
| 2007 | Epuration | Euzèbe | Jean-Louis Lorenzi | TV movie |
| 2007 | Chez Maupassant | The jeweler | Claude Chabrol | TV series (1 episode) |
| 2008 | La maison Tellier | Jean | Élisabeth Rappeneau | TV movie |
| 2008 | L'affaire Ben Barka | Souchon | Jean-Pierre Sinapi | TV movie |
| 2009 | Beauregard | Bras de fer | Jean-Louis Lorenzi | TV movie |
| 2009 | Diane, femme flic | Roger Coudray | Christian Bonnet | TV series (1 episode) |
| 2010 | En chantier, monsieur Tanner! | Durango | Stefan Liberski | TV movie |
| 2010 | Vidocq: Le Masque et la Plume | Larousse | Alain Choquart | TV movie |
| 2010 | La maison des Rocheville | René Fargues | Jacques Otmezguine | TV mini-series |
| 2011 | Bas les coeurs | Merlin | Robin Davis | TV movie |
| 2011 | Isabelle disparue | Warrant Mouton | Bernard Stora | TV movie |
| 2011 | Brassens, la mauvaise réputation | Marcel Planche | Gérard Marx | TV movie |
| 2011 | Je, François Villon, voleur, assassin, poète | Tressecaille | Serge Meynard | TV movie |
| 2011 | La très excellente et divertissante histoire de François Rabelais | Brother Coupe-Choux | Hervé Baslé | TV movie |
| 2011 | Rani | Notary François | Arnaud Sélignac | TV series (1 episode) |
| 2011 | Chez Maupassant | M. Caravan | Denis Malleval | TV series (1 episode) |
| 2013 | Doc Martin | Flavien | Jean-Pierre Sinapi | TV series (6 episodes) |
| 2014 | La clinique du docteur Blanche | Gérard de Nerval | Sarah Lévy | TV movie |
| 2015 | Danbé, la tête haute | Jeannot | Bourlem Guerdjou | TV movie |
| 2016 | L'île aux Femmes | Job Kervanec | Éric Duret | TV movie |
| 2016 | Chefs | Gérard | Clovis Cornillac | TV series (1 episode) |
| 2016 | Cherif | Bertrand Monnier | Julien Zidi | TV series (2 episodes) |
| 2017 | À la dérive | Cabestany | Philippe Venault | TV movie |
| 2017 | Scènes de ménages | Jean-François | Francis Duquet | TV series (1 episode) |
| 2017 | Holly Weed | Franz | Laurent de Vismes | TV series (12 episodes) |
| 2018 | Sous la Peau | Yvan | Didier Le Pêcheur | TV mini-series |
| 2019 | Nina | Marin | Jérôme Portheault | TV series (1 episode) |
| 2019 | Peplum | The screamer | Maurice Barthélemy | TV series (2 episodes) |
| 2019 | Mike | Serge | Frédéric Hazan | TV series (6 episodes) |
| 2019-2023 | Le crime lui va si bien | Anton Vargas | Stéphane Kappes & Nadja Anane | TV series (7 episodes) |
| 2020 | Groom | The gardener | Théodore Bonnet | TV series (1 episode) |
| 2020 | Capitaine Marleau | Warrant Michel Pichon | Josée Dayan | TV series (1 episode) |
| 2021 | Scènes de ménages | Jean-François | Francis Duquet | TV series (1 episode) |
| 2022 | Le Voyageur | Daniel | Marjolaine de Lecluse | TV series (1 episode) |
| 2023 | L'art du crime | Didier Kaddour | Floriane Crépin | TV series (1 episode) |
| 2023 | Killer Coaster | Patoche | Nikola Lange | TV series (8 episodes) |
