= The Rabbi's Cat =

The Rabbi's Cat may refer to:

- The Rabbi's Cat (comics), a French comic by Joann Sfar
- The Rabbi's Cat (film), 2011 French animated film directed by Joann Sfar and Antoine Delesvaux, based on volume one, two and five of Sfar's comics series
