= Lorella Cravotta =

French comedian and actress

- Born: 9 April 1958 (age 68); Molières-sur-Cèze, Gard, France
- Occupations: Actress; comedian
- Years active: 1981–present

Lorella Cravotta (born 9 April 1958) is a French comedian and actress.

== Career ==
She is best known for her role in the cult TV series Les Deschiens (1993–2002), in which she appears alongside Yolande Moreau.

== Theatre ==
Year	Title	Writer	Director
1981	The Taming of the Shrew	William Shakespeare	René Jauneau
1982	Dell’inferno	Bernard Pautrat	André Engel
1984	Ivanov	Anton Chekhov	Claude Regy
1985–86	Romeo and Juliet	William Shakespeare	Daniel Mesguich
1986	Marat/Sade	Peter Weiss	Walter Lemolli
1989	Lapin chasseur	Jérôme Deschamps & Macha Makeïeff	Jérôme Deschamps & Macha Makeïeff
1991	Les pieds dans l'eau	Jérôme Deschamps & Macha Makeïeff	Jérôme Deschamps & Macha Makeïeff
1994	The Hour We Knew Nothing of Each Other	Peter Handke	Luc Bondy
1995	Le Défilé	Jérôme Deschamps & Macha Makeïeff	Jérôme Deschamps & Macha Makeïeff
1997	Les Précieuses ridicules	Molière	Jérôme Deschamps & Macha Makeïeff
2002–03	État critique	Michel Lengliney	Éric Civanyan
2004	Moscou, quartier des cerises	Dmitri Shostakovich	Jérôme Deschamps & Macha Makeïeff
2007	L'affaire de la rue de lourcine	Eugène Marin Labiche	Jérôme Deschamps & Macha Makeïeff
2009	Salle des fêtes	Jérôme Deschamps & Macha Makeïeff	Jérôme Deschamps & Macha Makeïeff
2011	Jungles	Susy Firth, Michèle Guigon & Patrice Thibaud	Susy Firth, Michèle Guigon & Patrice Thibaud
2014	Tartuffe	Molière	Luc Bondy
2019	Tout le monde ne peut pas être orphelin	Jean-Christophe Meurisse	Jean-Christophe Meurisse
2020	La peste c’est Camus, mais la grippe est-ce Pagnol ?	Jean-Christophe Meurisse	Jean-Christophe Meurisse
2022–23	The Miser	Molière	Jérôme Deschamps

== Filmography ==
Year	Title	Role	Director	Notes
1987	Papillon du vertige	Thérèse	Jean-Yves Carrée	
1990	Tatie Danielle	Butcher's wife	Étienne Chatiliez	
1990	Docteur Petiot	The neighbor	Christian de Chalonge	
1990	Imogène	Yvette Bougrain	Thierry Chabert	TV series (1 episode)
1991	La pagaille	Chantal	Pascal Thomas	
1991	Toujours seuls	Madame Paroux	Gérard Mordillat	
1992	Le fils du Mékong	Amalia	François Leterrier	
1992	Imogène	Yvette Bougrain	Jean-Daniel Verhaeghe	TV series (1 episode)
1993	L'argent fait le bonheur	Madame Munoz	Robert Guédiguian	
1993	Une journée chez ma mère	Maria	Dominique Cheminal	
1993–2002	Les Deschiens	Lorella	Jérôme Deschamps & Macha Makeïeff	TV series
1995	The City of Lost Children	Woman at Her Window	Marc Caro & Jean-Pierre Jeunet	
1996	La Belle Verte	The client	Coline Serreau	
1997	Une mère comme on n'en fait plus	The director	Jacques Renard	TV movie
1998	Let There Be Light	Rachel	Arthur Joffé	
2000	Vive nous!	Lawyer	Camille de Casabianca	
2000	Fais-moi rêver	Store's owner	Jacky Katu	
2001	Amélie	Amandine Poulain	Jean-Pierre Jeunet	
2002	Hypnotized and Hysterical (Hairstylist Wanted)	Chief Nurse	Claude Duty	
2002	À l'abri des regards indiscrets	Impatient Woman	Ruben Alves & Hugo Gélin	Short
2002	Avocats & associés	Pauline Chaumartin	Christian Bonnet	TV series (1 episode)
2005	Il ne faut jurer... de rien!	Henriette	Eric Civanyan	
2005	L'évangile selon Aîmé	Solange	André Chandelle	TV movie
2008	Sex, Okra and Salted Butter	Madame Myriam	Mahamat Saleh Haroun	TV movie
2010	Romantics Anonymous	Magda	Jean-Pierre Améris	
2011	Brassens, la mauvaise réputation	Elvira Brassens	Gérard Marx	TV movie
2012	Les pieds dans le plat	Esther Benhaim	Simon Astier	TV movie
2014	Repas de famille	Huguette	Pierre-Henry Salfati	
2016	Deux escargots s'en vont	Voice	Jean-Pierre Jeunet & Romain Segaud	Short
2021	Bloody Oranges	Laurence	Jean-Christophe Meurisse	
2021	Partir un jour	Martine	Amélie Bonnin	Short
2024	The Art of Nothing	Macha Moniak	Stefan Liberski	
