= François Morel (actor) =

French actor and filmmaker (born 1959)

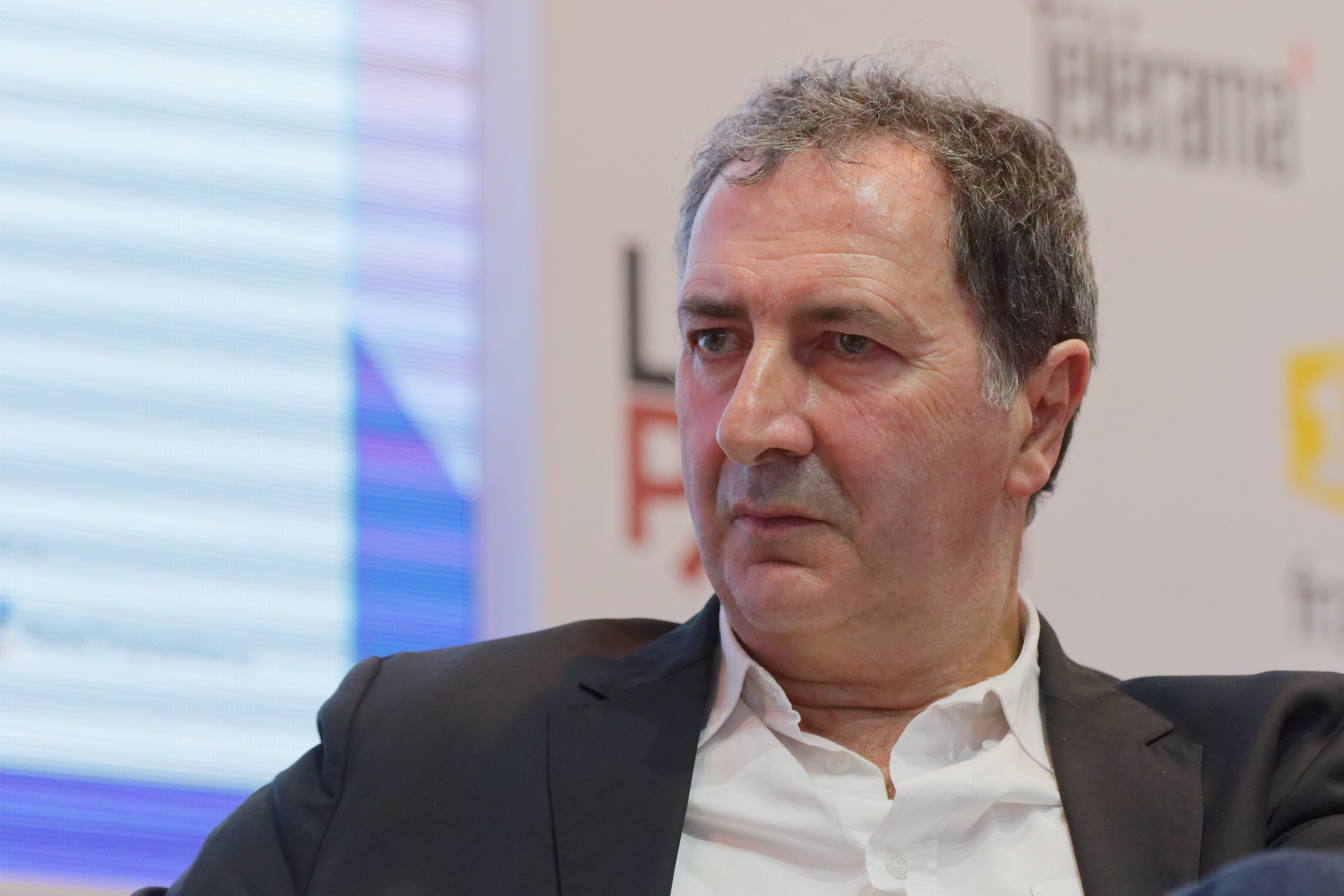
- François Morel in 2017
- Born: 10 June 1959 (age 67); Saint-Georges-des-Groseillers, France
- Occupations: Actor, screenwriter, comedian, director
- Years active: 1988–present

François Morel (born 10 June 1959) is a French actor, comedian, voice actor, and director. He is best known for appearing in sketch television series Les Deschiens (1993–2002) and in the series Les Daltons as the dog Rantanplan.

== Career ==
He obtained a master's degree in modern literature at the University of Caen Normandy and then, in 1981, he went to Paris, where he joined the school of the théâtre de la rue Blanche, where he met his partner and future wife, Christine Patry.

During the 90's, he often worked with the duo Jérôme Deschamps & Macha Makeieff.

In 2019, he received the Molière Award for Best Actor for J'ai des doutes, written by Raymond Devos.

== Theatre ==
Year	Title	Author	Director	Notes
1984	The Death of Pompey	Pierre Corneille	Brigitte Jaques-Wajeman	
1986	Les Dégourdis de la 11e	André Mouëzy-Éon & Georges Daveillans	Jacques Rosny	
1987	Kleist ou la Mort d'un poète	Heinrich von Kleist & Henriette Vogel	Michel Cerda	
1989–91	Lapin chasseur	Jérôme Deschamps & Macha Makeieff	Jérôme Deschamps & Macha Makeieff	
1990–91	Les Frères Zénith	Jérôme Deschamps	Jérôme Deschamps & Macha Makeieff	
1991	La Maison d'os	Roland Dubillard	Éric Vigner	
1992–94	Les brigands	Jacques Offenbach	Jérôme Deschamps & Macha Makeieff	
1992–93	Les pieds dans l'eau	Jérôme Deschamps & Macha Makeieff	Jérôme Deschamps & Macha Makeieff	
1994–96	C'est magnifique	Jérôme Deschamps & Macha Makeieff	Jérôme Deschamps & Macha Makeieff	
1997	Les Précieuses ridicules	Molière	Jérôme Deschamps & Macha Makeieff	
2000–02	Les Habits du dimanche	François Morel	Michel Cerda	
2003–04	Feydeau c'est fou !	Georges Feydeau	Tilly	
2004	Le Jardin aux betteraves	Roland Dubillard	Jean-Michel Ribes	
2006–11	Bien des choses	François Morel	François Morel	
2007–09	Les Diablogues	Roland Dubillard	Anne Bourgeois	
2011–13	Le Bourgeois gentilhomme	Molière	Catherine Hiegel	
2013–14	Bien des choses	François Morel	François Morel	
2013–16	La fin du monde est pour dimanche	François Morel	Benjamin Guillard	
2013–17	Hyacinthe et Rose	François Morel	François Morel	
2017	Pouët poète	François Morel	François Morel	
2017–19	1988, le débat Mitterrand Chirac		Jacques Weber	
2018–24	J'ai des doutes	Raymond Devos	François Morel	Molière Award for Best Actor
2021–24	Tous les marins sont des chanteurs	Gérard Mordillat & François Morel	François Morel	Nominated – Molière Award for Best Musical

== Filmography ==
Year	Title	Role	Director	Notes
1987	Marc et Sophie	Monsieur Duroc	Georges Bensoussan	TV series (1 episode)
1988	Matin de mariage		Gérard Jumel	Short
1988–89	Palace	Alfred	Jean-Michel Ribes	TV series (6 episodes)
1989	Cycle Simenon		Caroline Huppert	TV series (1 episode)
1993	Une journée chez ma mère	The paramedic	Dominique Cheminal	
1993	Une femme pour moi	Barman	Arnaud Sélignac	TV movie
1993–2002	Les Deschiens	M. Morel	Jérôme Deschamps & Macha Makeïeff	
1994	Dead Tired	Inspector's assistant	Michel Blanc	
1994	Lost in Transit	First C.R.S.	Philippe Lioret	
1994	L'homme empaillé		Philippe Venault	TV movie
1994	Les Cinq Dernières Minutes	The workshop man	Alain Wermus	TV series (1 episode)
1995	Les Anges gardiens	The steward	Jean-Marie Poiré	
1995	Happiness Is in the Field	Pouillaud	Étienne Chatiliez	
1995	Plaisir d'offrir		Marc-Henri Dufresne & François Morel	Short
1995	Le libraire de l'ambigu		Joachim Lombard	Short
1995	Lulu roi de France	Jambu	Bernard Uzan	TV movie
1995	Les années lycée	Alice's father	Manuel Poirier	TV series (1 episode)
1996	Fallait pas !...	Sébastien	Gérard Jugnot	
1996	Beaumarchais	Peasant in Court	Édouard Molinaro	
1996	Le rêve d'Esther	The monk	Jacques Otmezguine	TV movie
1997	Black Dju	Gérard de Foyer	Pol Cruchten	
1997	Alliance cherche doigt	Jean Morlaud	Jean-Pierre Mocky	
1997	Messieurs les enfants	Igor Laforgue	Pierre Boutron	
1997	Violetta la reine de la moto	Fred	Guy Jacques	
1998	Let There Be Light	Gravedigger God	Arthur Joffé	
1998	La mort du chinois	Thierry Berges	Jean-Louis Benoît	
1998	Le gone du Chaâba	Monsieur Grand	Christophe Ruggia	
1998	Ça reste entre nous	Maurice	Martin Lamotte	
1999	Tout baigne!	Jacques	Eric Civanyan	
1999	Le voyage à Paris	Jacques Dubosc	Marc-Henri Dufresne	
1999	War in the Highlands	Devenoge	Francis Reusser	
1999	Les migrations de Vladimir	Victor Lalumière	Milka Assaf	
1999	Un Noël de chien		Nadine Monfils	Short
2000	Actors	The autograph man	Bertrand Blier	
2000	Julien l'apprenti	Doinot	Jacques Otmezguine	TV movie
2001	Le coeur sur la main	The owner	Marie-Anne Chazel	Short
2001	Le divin enfant	Father Lafleur	Stéphane Clavier	TV movie
2001	Les p'tits gars Ladouceur	The director	Luc Béraud	TV movie
2002	If I Were a Rich Man	Jean-Phil	Gérard Bitton & Michel Munz	
2002	À l'abri des regards indiscrets	Unlucky	Ruben Alves & Hugo Gélin	Short
2002	Chut!	The psychiatrist	Philippe Setbon	TV movie
2002	Tous les chagrins se ressemblent	Alain	Luc Béraud	TV movie
2003	After the Life	Alain Costes	Lucas Belvaux	
2003	An Amazing Couple	Alain Costes	Lucas Belvaux	
2003	Une employée modèle	Inspector Bovary	Jacques Otmezguine	
2003	Kelif et Deutsch à la recherche d'un emploi		Frédéric Berthe	TV series (1 episode)
2004	When the Sea Rises	TV Host	Yolande Moreau & Gilles Porte	
2004	Au secours, j'ai 30 ans!	Thomas	Marie-Anne Chazel	
2004	Nos vies rêvées	Gilbert Tassin	Fabrice Cazeneuve	TV movie
2004	Nature contre nature	Bertrand Crémieux	Lucas Belvaux	TV movie
2005	Ze film	Legros	Guy Jacques	
2005	L'antidote	Monsieur Lebrochet	Vincent De Brus	
2005	Au sud des nuages	Roger	Jean-François Amiguet	
2005	Cyrano de Ménilmontant	Pierre-Jean	Marc Angelo	TV movie
2005	Kaamelott	Belt	Alexandre Astier	TV series (1 episode)
2005	Vénus & Apollon	Jacques	Pascal Lahmani & Tonie Marshall	TV series (1 episode)
2006	L'Entente Cordiale	Elliot de Saint-Hilaire	Vincent De Brus	
2006	The Year of the Hare	The pastor	Marc Rivière	
2006	Le grand appartement	The driver	Pascal Thomas	
2006	Mon père...	The father	David Léotard	Short
2006	Le Cri	Ferrari	Hervé Baslé	TV mini-series
2006–07	Rantanplan	Rantanplan	Hugo Gittard	TV series (76 episodes)
2007	Towards Zero	Inspector Martin Bataille	Pascal Thomas	
2007	Go West! A Lucky Luke Adventure	Rantanplan	Olivier Jean-Marie	
2007	La Saint-festin	The voice	Léo Marchand & Anne-Laure Daffis	Short
2007	Chez Maupassant	Morandu	Marc Rivière	TV series (1 episode)
2008	Paris 36	Célestin	Christophe Barratier	
2008	Fool Moon	Yannick	Jérôme L'hotsky	
2008	A Day at the Museum	Hervé Parking	Jean-Michel Ribes	
2009	Looking for Steven Spielberg	Valentin	Benjamin Guillard	Short
2009	L'affaire Salengro	Henri	Yves Boisset	TV movie
2009	Kaamelott	Belt	Alexandre Astier	TV series (1 episode)
2010	Gainsbourg: A Heroic Life	The boarding director	Joann Sfar	
2010	Le pigeon	Jean-Claude Jourdain	Lorenzo Gabriele	TV movie
2010	À 10 minutes de la plage	Monsieur Dubois	Stéphane Kappes	TV movie
2010	Les vivants et les morts	Lamy	Gérard Mordillat	TV series (8 episodes)
2010–11	La plus pire semaine de ma vie	Tournier	Frédéric Auburtin	TV series (2 episodes)
2010–15	Les Dalton	Rantanplan	Jim Gomez, Olivier Jean-Marie, ...	TV series (192 episodes)
2011	The Rabbi's Cat	The cat	Antoine Delesvaux & Joann Sfar	
2011	Hitler à Hollywood	Himself	Frédéric Sojcher	
2011	War of the Buttons	Father Bacaillé	Christophe Barratier	
2011	Holidays by the Sea	Camping Man	Pascal Rabaté	
2011	Gérald K Gérald	Gérald K Gérald	Élisabeth Rappeneau	TV movie
2011	Le grand restaurant II	Absurd Cloakroom	Gérard Pullicino	TV movie
2012	F.B.I. Frog Butthead Investigators	The tunnel man	Kad Merad & Olivier Baroux	
2012	Scènes de ménages	The mayor	Francis Duquet	TV series (1 episode)
2012	Fais pas ci, fais pas ça	Monsieur Ballud	Laurent Dussaux	TV series (1 episode)
2013	Serial Teachers	The deputy inspector	Pierre-François Martin-Laval	
2013	Le grand retournement	The first counselor	Gérard Mordillat	
2013	La vie sans truc	The voice	Léo Marchand & Anne-Laure Daffis	Short
2014	Aunt Hilda!	Ike	Benoît Chieux & Jacques-Rémy Girerd	
2014	À coup sûr	Doctor Gipch	Delphine de Vigan	
2014	The Missionaries	Alain	Tonie Marshall	
2014	Brèves de comptoir	Pivert	Jean-Michel Ribes	
2014	Asterix: The Land of the Gods	Unhygienix	Louis Clichy & Alexandre Astier	
2014	Mortal Breakup Inferno	The voice	Batiste Perron, Paula Assadourian, ...	Short
2014	L'homme qui avait perdu la tête	Alain	Fred Joyeux	Short
2014	À livre ouvert	Edouard Balser	Stéphanie Chuat & Véronique Reymond	TV series (6 episodes)
2015	Valentin Valentin	Roger	Pascal Thomas	
2015	Une famille à louer	Léon	Jean-Pierre Améris	
2015	Peplum	Father Jonathan	Philippe Lefebvre	TV series (8 episodes)
2015–20	Tu mourras moins bête...	Professor Moustache	Amandine Fredon, Hélène Friren, ...	TV series (70 episodes)
2016	L'élan	The mechanic	Étienne Labroue	
2016	Sur quel pied danser	Félicien Couture	Paul Calori & Kostia Testut	
2016	Après Suzanne	Joseph	Félix Moati	Short
2016	Monsieur Paul	Paul Touvier	Olivier Schatzky	TV movie
2017	Loulou	The father	Émilie Noblet	TV series (1 episode)
2018	La monnaie de leur pièce	The narrator	Anne Le Ny	
2018	Asterix: The Secret of the Magic Potion	Unhygienix	Louis Clichy & Alexandre Astier	
2018	Mélancolie ouvrière	Émile Morel	Gérard Mordillat	TV movie
2018	Les impatientes	Judge Villedieu	Jean-Marc Brondolo	TV mini-series
2018	Qu'est ce qu'on attend pour être heureux?	Michel	Marie-Hélène Copti	TV series (1 episode)
2018–20	Baron Noir	Michel Vidal	Ziad Doueiri, Antoine Chevrollier, ...	TV series (10 episodes)
2019	À cause des filles..?	Jules	Pascal Thomas	
2019	C'est quoi ton nome	Himself	Emilie & Sarah Barbault	TV series (1 episode)
2020	Josep	Robert	Aurel	
2021	The Speech	Adrien's father	Laurent Tirard	
2021	Pourris gâtés	Ferrucio	Nicolas Cuche	
2021	Le trésor du petit Nicolas	Monsieur Blédurt	Julien Rappeneau	
2021	Kaamelott: The First Chapter	Belt	Alexandre Astier	
2021	Thief of Fire		Jean-Christophe Meunier	Short
2021	Les bois maudits	Father Mollaret	Jean-Marc Rudnicki	TV movie
2022	Les sans-dents	The inspector	Pascal Rabaté	
2022	Les goûts et les couleurs	Jean-Pierre Michel	Michel Leclerc	
2022	Les voisins de mes voisins sont mes voisins	The ogre	Léo Marchand & Anne-Laure Daffis	
2022	Loulou	The father	Émilie Noblet	TV movie
2023	Juste ciel!	Monsieur Pierre	Laurent Tirard	
2023	La grande magie	Gabriel	Noémie Lvovsky	
2023	Comme une louve	The judge	Caroline Glorion	
2023	La fiancée du poète	Pierre	Yolande Moreau	
2024	Première affaire	Edouard Saint-Brieuc	Victoria Musiedlak	Post-Production
2024	Finalement		Claude Lelouch	Post-Production
