= Hélène de Fougerolles =

French actress

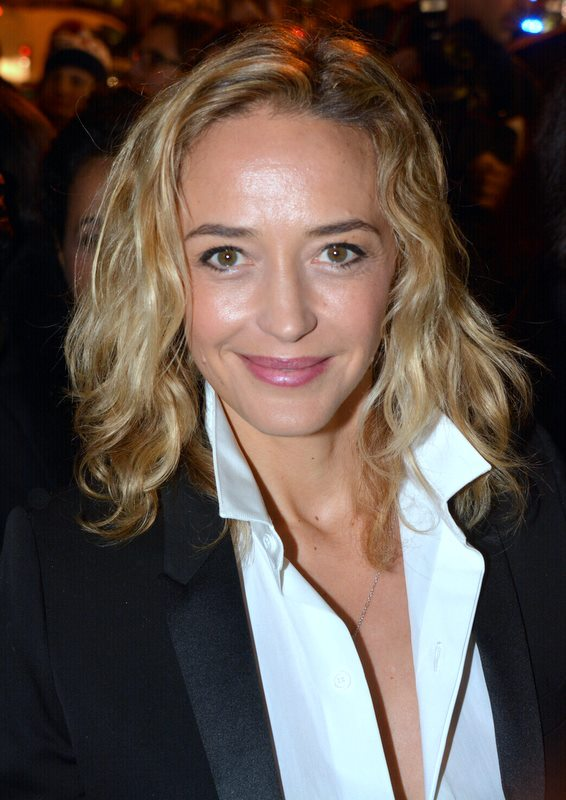
- De Fougerolles at the Globe de Cristal Awards ceremony in February 2017
- Born: Hélène Christine Marie Rigoine de Fougerolles; 25 February 1973 (age 53); Vannes, Morbihan, France
- Occupation: Actress
- Years active: 1992–present
- Spouse: Éric Hubert (m. 1997; div. 2004)
- Children: 1

Hélène Christine Marie Rigoine de Fougerolles (French pronunciation: [elɛn də fuʒʁɔl]; born 25 February 1973) is a French actress who was twice nominated for the César Award for Most Promising Actress (known as the French Oscar) for Arthur Joffé's Let There Be Light (1998) and Jacques Rivette's Va savoir (2001) for which she was also awarded the Prix Romy Schneider. de Fougerolles spent the first phase of her career in auteur cinema appearing in such films as Jean-Pierre Mocky's Le Mari de Léon (1992), Patrice Chéreau's La Reine Margot (1994), Cédric Klapisch's Le Péril jeune (1994), Philippe Harel's The Story of a Boy Who Wanted to Be Kissed alongside Marion Cotillard, Mathieu Kassovitz's Assassin(s) (1997) or Baltasar Kormákur's The Sea (2002). She played Madame de Pompadour twice, in Fanfan la Tulipe (2003) alongside Penélope Cruz and Robin Davis' Jeanne Poisson (2006). As of 2021, she has starred in more than 60 cinema, television and theatre productions and her book T'inquiète pas, maman, ça va aller (2021) about her daughter's autism is published throughout the French-speaking world.

== Early life ==
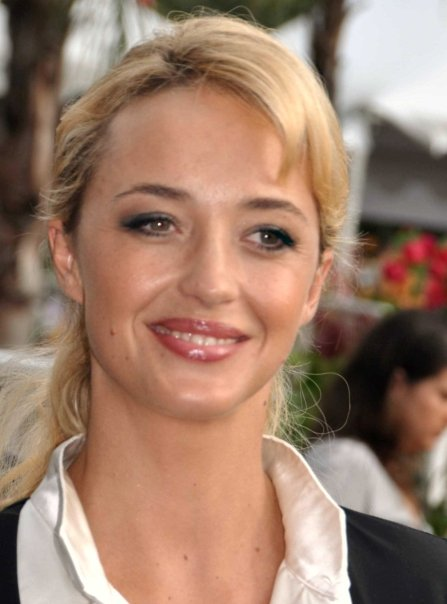
De Fougerolles in 2009

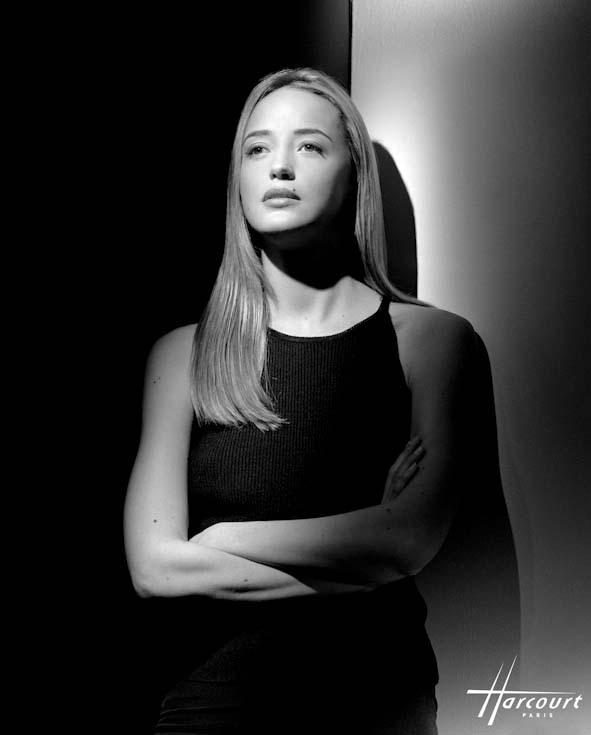
By Studio Harcourt in 2008

De Fougerolles was born on 25 February 1973 in Vannes, Morbihan, France and spent years of her childhood in Guadeloupe. The daughter of wine salesman Alain Rigoine de Fougerolles and breton sailing publicist Anne Saumay de Laval. Her parents divorced when she was three. She was initially planning to become a beautician, but she began to study acting at age 15. She later attended acting classes in Paris and briefly attending the Lee Strasberg Institute in New York City.

== Career ==
In 1992, Hélène de Fougerolles began her acting career by appearing in the sitcom "Broken Hearts College", (Le Collège des cœurs brisés) produced by AB Productions. In 1992, she made her screen debut in the film "Le Mari de Léon". The film was directed by Jean-Pierre Mocky. In the years that followed, she took on a number of minor roles.

In 1999, de Fougerolles auditioned for Danny Boyle's The Beach to act alongside Leonardo DiCaprio but casting directors immediately told her that she was not mysterious enough as she arrived with blond hair in pigtails. She asked them if she could "be an extra or serve coffees there, three months in Thailand, it sounds idyllic!". Although firstly reticent because the actress was already established in the industry, they finally accepted. As journalists were not allowed to come take pictures on set, the only picture the press could have of Guillaume Canet and Virginie Ledoyen before shooting started, was their departure at Paris airport with de Fougerolles. They made it the cover of Studio magazine from which the international press reported her as officially cast. This eventually led to her lines being edited out of the final cut but present in the DVD extras.

She made her first ever theatrical stage appearance in Occupe-toi d'Amélie! alongside Bruno Putzulu at the Théâtre de la Michodière in Paris from September 2012 to May 2013.

In the 2010s, her professional focus shifted toward television. In 2018, she took on the role of Hélène Bach in "Balthazar", marking her first regular role in a television series. On December 18, 2020, she announced via social media that she was leaving the series. On November 21, 2022, she began starring in the series "Sam", starting from its seventh season.

== Personal life ==
De Fougerolles was married to Éric Hubert in 1997 and they have a daughter, born in 2003. The couple later divorced in 2004. She engages in hypnotherapy, yoga, and reiki. She loves animals very much and has a knack for connecting with them, she is vegan. She also enjoys painting and gardening.

== Filmography ==
Year	Title	Role	Director	Notes
1992–1995	Le Collège des cœurs brisés	Anne-Marie	Olivier Altman; Gérard Espinasse	Television series (37 episodes)
1993	Le Mari de Léon	Geneviève	Jean-Pierre Mocky	
1994	Jeanne la Pucelle II - Les prisons	Jeanne de Bar	Jacques Rivette	
1994	La Cité de la peur	Sandy Brookshield	Alain Berbérian	
1994	L'Histoire du garçon qui voulait qu'on l'embrasse	Kissing girl on the bridge	Philippe Harel	
1994	La Reine Margot	A courtesan	Patrice Chéreau	
1994	Le Péril jeune	Christine	Cédric Klapisch	
1995	Été brulant	Natacha	Jérôme Foulon	Television film
1995–1997	Avocat d'office	Marie Moretti	Gabriel Aghion; Bernard Stora	Television series (2 episodes)
1996	When the Cat's Away	A model	Cédric Klapisch (2)	
1996	Le Cheval de cœur	Véronique	Charlotte Brändström	Television film
1996	Long cours	Charlotte	Alain Tasma	Television film
1997	La Divine Poursuite	Karine	Michel Deville	
1997	Assassin(s)	Hélène	Mathieu Kassovitz	
1997	La Leçon de Monsieur Paillasson		Michel Fessler	Short film
1998	Que la lumière soit	Jeanne	Arthur Joffé	Nominated — César Award for Most Promising Actress
1999	The Fall	Márta Kiss	Andrew Piddington	
1999	De source sûre	Muriel	Laurent Tirard	Short film
1999	Un café... l'addition	Julie	Félicie Dutertre; François Rabes	Short film
2000	The Beach	Beach Community Member	Danny Boyle	
2000	Le Prof	Manon	Alexandre Jardin	
2001	Mortel Transfert	Olga Kubler	Jean-Jacques Beineix	
2001	Va savoir	Dominique 'Do'	Jacques Rivette (2)	Nominated — César Award for Most Promising Actress
2002	The Race	Léonore de Segonzac	Djamel Bensalah	
2002	The Sea	Françoise	Baltasar Kormákur	
2003	Fanfan la Tulipe	Madame de Pompadour	Gérard Krawczyk	
2003	Vertiges	Lisa Weber	Laurent Carcélès	Television series (1 episode)
2003	Lapin intégral	The girl	Cécilia Rouaud	Short film
2004	Ne quittez pas !	Air Hostess	Arthur Joffé (2)	
2004	Innocence	Mademoiselle Edith	Lucile Hadžihalilović	
2004	Si j'étais elle	Alice	Stéphane Clavier	Television film
2004	Le Plus Beau Jour de ma vie	Lola	Julie Lipinski	
2004	Les gens honnêtes vivent en France	Agnès Leroux	Bob Decout	
2005	Einstein's Big Idea (E=mc2 - Une biographie de l'équation)	Émilie du Châtelet	Gary Johnstone	Television film
2006	Incontrôlable	Marion	Raffy Shart	
2006	Sable noir	Juliette	Olivier Megaton	Television series (1 episode)
2006	Les Aristos	Marie-Stéphanie Montcougnet	Charlotte de Turckheim	
2006	Jeanne Poisson, marquise de Pompadour	Madame de Pompadour	Robin Davis	Television film
2006	Des fleurs pour Algernon	Alice	David Delrieux	Television film
2006	Pardonnez-moi	Billy	Maïwenn	
2007	New Délire	Paula	Éric Le Roch	
2008	Papillon noir	Laura	Christian Faure	Television film
2008	Sans état d'âme	Jeanne	Vincenzo Marano	
2008	Les Dents de la nuit	Jessica Conti	Stephen Cafiero; Vincent Lobelle	
2009	Mutants	Sonia	David Morley	
2009	Tricheuse	Clémence	Jean-François Davy	
2009	Les Fausses Innocences	Mathilda Stembert	André Chandelle	Television film
2009	Sommeil blanc	Camille	Jean-Paul Guyon	
2011	Maman !	Léa	Hélène de Fougerolles	Short film
2011	Moi et ses ex	Alice	Vincent Giovanni	Television film
2013	Le collier du Makoko		Henri-Joseph Koumba Bididi	
2015	Le Secret d'Élise		Alexandre Laurent	TV miniseries
2015	Accusé	Claire Brattner		Television series (1 episode)
2016	Arrête ton cinéma	Marion	Diane Kurys	
2016	Les Liens du cœur	Gaëlle	Régis Musset	Television film
2016	Meurtres à Strasbourg	Katel Leguennec	Laurence Katrian	Television film
2017	La Loi de Julien	Séverine Delamarche	Christophe Douchand	Television film
2017	Mention particulière	Fanny	Christophe Campos	Television film
2018–2020	Balthazar	Hélène Bach		Television series

== Theatre ==
- Occupe-toi d'Amélie (2012) - Théâtre de la Michodière

Original Poster of Occupe-toi d'Amélie

== Awards and nominations ==
- 2001: Romy Schneider Award
- 2002: Nominated – César Award for Most Promising Young Actress
