= Pascal Rabaté =

French cartoonist and film director (born 1961)

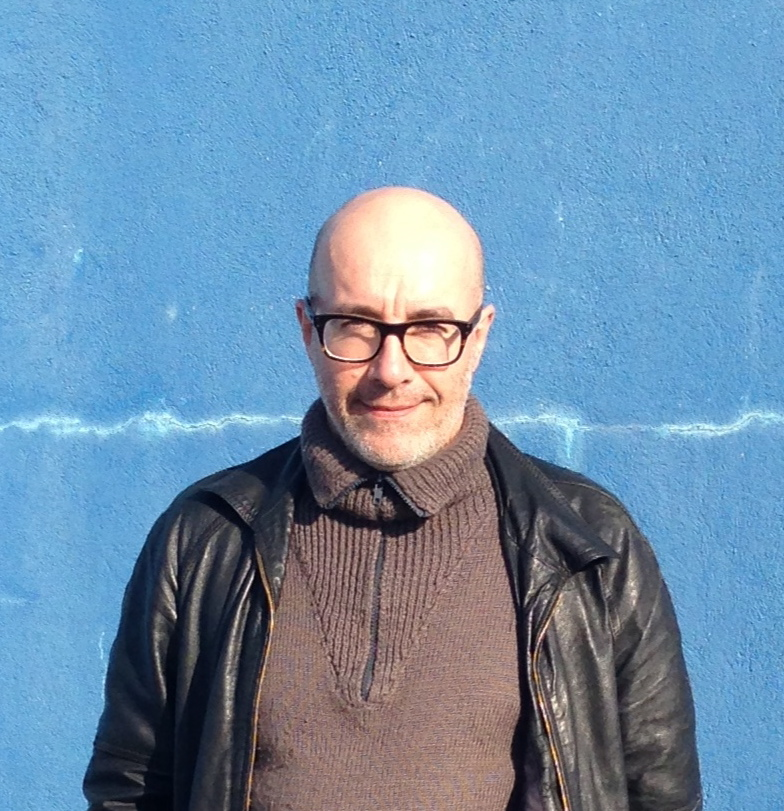
- Born: 13 August 1961 (age 65)
- Areas: Cartoonist, Writer
- Notable works: comic book adaptation of Ibicus
- Awards: Officier of the Ordre des Arts et des Lettres

Pascal Rabaté (born 13 August 1961) is a French comic book author and film director.

== Biography ==
Pascal Rabaté was born in Tours and grew up in Langeais. After studying engraving at the École des Beaux-Arts d'Angers in the early 1980s, he dedicated himself to comics in 1989. Working as a writer and illustrator, he explores a wide variety of worlds throughout his works. Influenced in the beginning by Buzzelli, Battaglia, Bofa, Pellos and Alexis, his work took an expressionist way. His comic book adaptation of Alexis Tolstoy novel Ibicus became a success among critics and readers. He made his film debut in 2010 with Les Petits Ruisseaux (Wandering Streams) adaptation of the comic book of the same name.

== Publications ==
- Exode, Futuropolis, coll. «Gros nez», 1989,
- Les Amants de Lucie, Futuropolis, coll. «X», 1989,
- Vacances, vacances, Futuropolis, coll. «Hic et Nunc», 1990,
- À table, Week-end doux, 1991,
- Signé Raoul, Rackham, 1991,
- Les Pieds dedans, Vents d'Ouest:
1. Villa mon rêve, 1992,
2. À la noce comme à la noce, 1992,
3. Dans la dentelle, 1995,
- Les Cerisiers, L'Association, coll. «Patte de mouche», 1992,
- Ex voto (art), with Angelo Zamparutti (writer), Vents d'Ouest, 1994,
- Barbusse, (Illustration) with Jean Sanitas and Paul Markides, Éditions Valmont fir Lajacquerie Création, 1996,
- Un ver dans le fruit, Vents d'Ouest, 1997
- Ibicus, after the novel by Alexis Tolstoy, Vents d'Ouest:
1. Tome 1, 1998
2. Tome 2, 1999
3. Tome 3, 2000
4. Tome 4, 2001
  - Intégrale, 2005
- Un temps de toussaint (drawing), with Angelo Zamparutti (story), Amok, coll. « Feu ! », 1999.
- Premières cartouches, Vents d'Ouest (Intégrale), 1999. Réédition des albums Futuropolis,
- Jacques a dit et Le Jeu du foulard (story), with David Prudhomme (drawing), Charrette, coll. « La petite saloperie », 2000,
- Les Yeux dans le bouillon (story), with Virginie Broquet (drawing), Casterman, 2000.
- Tartines de courant d'air (story), with Bibeur-Lu (drawing), Vents d'Ouest, 2001
1. Tome 1, Tartine de courant d'air, 2001,
2. Tome 2, Biscottes dans le vent (+intégrale), 2013,
- Bienvenue à Jobourg, Le Seuil, 2003.
- Jusqu'à Sakhaline. D'après un voyage de Tchékhov (drawing and adaptation), with Jean-Hugues Berrou (photographies), Éditions de l'An 2, 2005,
- La Marie en plastique (story), with David Prudhomme (drawing), Futuropolis :
1. Tome 1, 2006,
2. Tome 2 et intégrale, 2007,
- Les Petits Ruisseaux, Futuropolis, 2006,
- Louise Michel after the story by Benoît Delépine and Gustave Kervern, Éditions Danger Public, 2008,
- Bien des choses (drawing), with François Morel (text), Futuropolis, 2009 ISBN 9782754803144,
- Le Petit Rien tout neuf with un ventre jaune, Futuropolis, 2009 ISBN 978-2754802772
- Collective work Rupestres!, Futuropolis, 2011,
- Charles Trenet, Édition BDmusic 2011,
- Participation à Comicscope de David Rault, L'Apocalypse, 2013
- Crève saucisse (story), with Simon Hureau (drawing), Futuropolis, 2013,
- L'Enfant qui rêvait d'étoiles (Dans les pas de Yannick Alléno), with Aymeric Mantoux (story), 12 bis, 2013,
- Fenêtre sur rue, Édition Soleil Productions, Noctambule (collection), 2013
- English edition: Street View, 2014, NBM Publishing. ISBN 9781561639083
- Biscottes dans le vent (story), with Bibeur Lu (drawing), Vents d'ouest, 2013,
- Le Linge sale (story), with Sébastien Gnaedig (drawing), Vents d'ouest, 2014,
- Un temps de Toussaint (drawing) with Angelo Zamparutti (story), Futuropolis, 2014 - Réédition,
- Vive la marée !, with David Prudhomme, Futuropolis, 2015 ISBN 978-2-7548-1214-6, re-edited in the collection Poche, 2022 ISBN 978-2-7548-3369-1
- La Déconfiture, Tome 1, Futuropolis, 2016,
- Ibicus intégrale, Vents d'Ouest, 2016, 552 pages ISBN 978-2-7493-0834-0
- Alexandrin ou l'Art de faire des vers à pieds, drawing by Alain Kokor, Futuropolis, 2017,
- La Déconfiture, Tome 2, Futuropolis, 2018
- Didier, la 5e roue du tracteur,, (story), with François Ravard (drawing), Futuropolis, 2018
- C'est aujourd'hui que je vous aime, after the novel by François Morel, Les Arènes, 20191
- Sous les galets la plage, Rue de Sèvres, 2021 - Official selection of the Festival d'Angoulême 2022 ISBN 978-2-8102-0111-2
- Un crime parfait, Collective work, Phileas, 2022
- La loi des probabilités, (story), with François Ravard (drawing), Futuropolis, 2023
- Femme Vie Liberté, Collective work, L'Iconoclaste, 2023
- Pigments, Collective work, Futuropolis, 2024
- La déconfiture, Intégrale, Futuropolis, 2025

== Spectacles ==
- Sale Affaire: Sex and Crime, by and starring Yolande Moreau, illustrated by Pascal Rabaté, with artistic direction by Michel Archimbaud and Benoît Mouchart (Angoulême, 2008)

== Filmography as director ==
- 2006 : Cavaliers faciles, BRUT productions, 2006, with Pascal Rabaté, Philippe Jean, Sacha Bourdo, David Salles.
- 2010 : Les Petits Ruisseaux, Production Loin Derrière l'Oural, distributor Ad Vitam, 23/06/2010, with Daniel Prévost, Hélène Vincent.
- 2011 : Ni à vendre ni à louer, Production Loin Derrière l'Oural, distributor Ad Vitam with Jacques Gamblin, Maria de Medeiros.
- 2014 : Du goudron et des plumes, Production Loin Derrière l'Oural with Sami Bouajila, Isabelle Carré.
- 2020 : Les Sans-dents, Production Loin Derrière l'Oural with Yolande Moreau, Gustave Kervern, François Morel.

== Awards and honours ==
=== Decoration ===
- Officier des arts et des lettres, 2014,.

=== Comic books ===
- 1992 : prix découverte de la ville de Sierre.
- 1997 :
  - grand prix de la ville de Sierre for Un ver dans le fruit.
  - prix Nouvelle République for Un ver dans le fruit.
  - prix du meilleur album de l'année, festival de Brignais for Un ver dans le fruit.
- 1998 :
  - prix Bloody Mary de l'ACBD for Un ver dans le fruit.
  - mention Spéciale du Jury œcuménique de la bande dessinée 1998 for Un ver dans le fruit.
  - prix des libraires de bande dessinée Ibicus, t. 1.
  - prix des librairies Extrapole Ibicus t. 1.
  - prix «Attention talent» de la Fnac Ibicus t. 1.
- 1999 :
  - prix Yves-Chaland for Ibicus, t. 1.
  - prix de la ville de Genève pour la bande dessinée, catégorie International, Ibicus, t. 2.
- 2000 : Alph'Art du meilleur album for Ibicus, t. 2 at the festival d'Angoulême 2000,
- 2003 : grand prix du festival Des Planches et des Vaches for his whole body of work .
- 2006 :
  - prix Bédélys Monde for Les Petits Ruisseaux.
  - prix de la BD du Point for Les Petits Ruisseaux.
- 2007 :
  - prix Maurice-Petitdidier for Les Petits Ruisseaux
  - grand prix de la critique ACBD for Les Petits Ruisseaux
- 2008 : « Essentiel » d'Angoulême for La Marie en plastique (with David Prudhomme),
- 2009 : prix Jacques-Lob du festival Bd BOUM de Blois for his whole body of work.
- 2010 : grand prix Quai des bulles.
- 2014 : Official selection of the festival d'Angoulême for Fenêtres sur rue.
- 2016 : Official selection of the Festival d'Angoulême 2016 for Vive la marée ! (with David Prudhomme).
- 2018 : prix Château de Cheverny de la bande dessinée historique for La Déconfiture, t. 2.
- 2019 : prix de la BD bretonne 2019 for Didier, la 5e roue du tracteur (with François Ravard).
- 2022 : Official selection of the festival d'Angoulême for Sous les galets la plage

=== Film ===
- Best Director Prize at the festival international du film de Karlovy Vary (Czechia) for Ni à vendre ni à louer 2011.
- Best film at Be TV Award et RTBF TV Award Festival Européen du Film de Bruxelles for Ni à vendre ni à louer 2011.
- Special jury Award at the Batumi International Art House Film Festival (Géorgie) for Ni à vendre ni à louer 2011.

== Annex ==
=== Bibliography ===
==== Books ====
- Patrick Gaumer, Rabaté, Pascal, dans Dictionnaire mondial de la BD, Paris, Larousse, 2010 (ISBN 978-2-03-584331-9), p. 705-706.

==== Periodicals ====
- Pissavy-Yvernault, Christelle et Bertrand (December 2001). "Bibliographie". dBD (in French) (13 (cahier n°2)): 35-40..
- Vincent Bernière (2002). "Pascal Rabaté". Beaux Arts Magazine, hors-série : Qu'est-ce que la BD aujourd'hui ?: 102-103. ISSN 0757-2271.
- Vincent Bernière (April–June 2018). "Pascal Rabaté. Une vie tout en images". Les Cahiers de la bande dessinée (3): 40-49..
- Violaine Joffart (May 2006). "Les petits ruisseaux : vivement la retraite". DBD (2): 31..

==== Interviews ====
- Pascal Rabaté (December 2001). "L'Éloge du dérisoire". DBD (in French) (13 (cahier n°2)): 3-34. dbd..
- Pascal Rabaté; Frédéric Bosser (October 2008). "Rabaté, un artiste engagé". DBD (27): 18-20..
- Pascal Rabaté; Frédéric Bosser (June 2010). "Pascal Rabaté : mourez heureux... mes amis". DBD (44): 18-23..
