= Jean-Louis Benoît =

French actor, screenwriter, theater and film director

Jean-Louis Benoît (French: [ʒɑ̃lwi bənwa]; born 22 January 1947 in Alès, Gard) is a French actor, screenwriter, theater and film director.

He is co-founder with Didier Bezace and Jacques Nichet of the theatre of l'Aquarium-Cartoucherie de Vincennes.

== Filmography ==
As an actor :

- 1981 : Une sale affaire by Alain Bonnot with Victor Lanoux and Marlène Jobert
- 1983 : La Guerre des demoiselles by Jacques Nichet with Jean-Paul Roussillon
- 1985 : Les Poings fermés with André Wilms
- 1987 : Les Noces barbares by Marion Hänsel with Marianne Basler
- 1992 : L.627 by Bertrand Tavernier with Didier Bezace

As a director :

- 1985 : Les Poings fermés with André Wilms
- 1989 : Dédé
- 1997 : La Mort du Chinois with François Berléand, José Garcia and Isabelle Carré

As a writer :

- 1998 : Que la lumière soit directed by Arthur Joffé
