= Let There Be Light (1998 film) =

- Film poster
- Directed by: Arthur Joffé
- Written by: Arthur Joffé; Jean-Louis Benoît; Laurent Jaoui
- Produced by: Claudie Ossard; André Szöts; Patrick Batteux
- Starring: Hélène de Fougerolles; Tchéky Karyo; Ticky Holgado; Pierre Arditi; Arielle Dombasle; Catherine Jacob; Yolande Moreau; Michel Galabru; José Garcia
- Cinematography: Philippe Welt
- Edited by: Marie Castro-Vasquez
- Music by: Angélique & Jean-Claude Nachon
- Production companies: Ciby 2000; France 2 Cinéma; Victoires Productions
- Distributed by: AFMD
- Release date: 8 July 1998
- Running time: 110 minutes
- Country: France
- Language: French
- Box office: $105.000

Let There Be Light (original title: Que la lumière soit !) is a 1998 comedy fantasy film directed by Arthur Joffé, starring an ensemble cast.

== Cast ==
- Hélène de Fougerolles as Jeanne
- Tchéky Karyo as Harper
- Ticky Holgado as Angel René
- Bruce Myers as The Rabbi
- Lorella Cravotta as Rachel
- Gordon Tootoosis as Indian God
- Catherine Jacob as God Suzanne
- Patrick Bouchitey as Pilot God
- Arielle Dombasle as Blond God
- Élie Semoun as Seller God
- Yolande Moreau as Contractual God
- Frédéric Mitterrand as Driver God
- Julien Guiomar as God Father
- François Morel as Gravedigger God
- Sergio Castellitto as Tourist God
- Michel Galabru as Southern God
- Arthur Joffé as Shower & Phone God
- Patrick Poivre d'Arvor as Journalist God
- José Garcia as The Journalist
- Éric Blanc as Guardian God
- Jacques Weber as Professor Lang
- Rufus as Harper's driver
- Zinedine Soualem as Dustman God
- Michael Lonsdale as Monsignor Loublié
- Justine Johnston as The Old American
- David Labiosa as The Thief
- Dominique Farrugia as The taxi
- Dominique Besnehard as Advertising director
- Patrick Braoudé as Advertising presenter
- André Valardy as The bear trainer
- Maïté as Nurse God
- Marie-Pierre Casey as Mother Michu
- Harry Holtzman as Martin
- Pierre Arditi Invincible God's Voice
