= Holidays by the Sea =

2011 film

- Directed by: Pascal Rabaté
- Written by: Pascal Rabaté
- Produced by: Xavier Delmas
- Starring: Jacques Gamblin; Maria de Medeiros; François Damiens
- Cinematography: Benoît Chamaillard
- Release date: 29 June 2011
- Running time: 77 minutes
- Country: France
- Language: French

Holidays by the Sea (French: Ni à vendre ni à louer) is a 2011 French comedy film directed by Pascal Rabaté. The film is a cinematic rendering of a comic that Rabaté himself wrote. Like in some films of Jacques Tati, the characters use expressions and gestures instead of dialogues to communicate between them.

== Plot ==
The plot of the film intertwines various unrelated characters and stories of ordinary people on their way to and spending their holidays at a seaside resort.

== Cast ==
- Jacques Gamblin as Monsieur Cerf-volant
- Maria de Medeiros as Madame Collier
- François Damiens as Monsieur Fraises
- François Morel as The man in the tent
- Dominique Pinon as The man in the trailer
- Gustave Kervern as Green golfer
- Marie Kremer as The orphan
- Chantal Neuwirth as The widow
- Catherine Hosmalin as House's woman

== Accolades ==
The film was nominated for the Crystal Globe at the 46th Karlovy Vary International Film Festival and Rabaté won the Best Director Award. It was also nominated for the International Jury Award as Best Feature Film at the São Paulo International Film Festival.
