= Wandering Streams =

- Film poster
- French: Les petits ruisseaux
- Directed by: Pascal Rabaté
- Starring: Daniel Prévost; Bulle Ogier
- Release date: 23 June 2010
- Running time: 94 minutes
- Country: France
- Language: French

Wandering Streams (French: Les petits ruisseaux, lit. 'Small streams') is a 2010 French drama film directed by Pascal Rabaté. The film follows Émile, a retired horticulturalist, who spends his time fishing and talking with friends. When his close friend dies, Émile realises he wants to do more with his life.

== Cast ==
- Daniel Prévost as Émile
- Bulle Ogier as Lucie
- Hélène Vincent as Lyse
- Julie-Marie Parmentier as Lena
- Philippe Nahon as Edmond
- Bruno Lochet as Gérard

== See also ==
- List of French films of 2010
