= Sex, Okra and Salted Butter =

- Screenplay by: Mahamat-Saleh Haroun; Marc Gautron; Isabelle Boni Claverie
- Directed by: Mahamat Saleh Haroun
- Starring: Marius Yelolo; Aïssa Maïga; Mata Gabin; Lorella Cravotta; Diouc Koma; Marie-Philmène Nga; Claudia Tagbo
- Country of origin: France

Production
- Producers: Agat Films & Cie
- Cinematography: François Kuhnel
- Editor: Marie-Hélène Dozo
- Running time: 81 minutes

Original release
- Release: 2008

Sex, Okra and Salted Butter (Sexe, gombo et beurre salé) is a 2008 comedy drama film that was originally produced for television. The film focusses on a Malian family living in Bordeaux, France.

== Plot ==
Hortense (Mata Gabin), a nurse of African origin in her forties, abandons her family to be with her lover, Jean-Paul – an oyster cultivator in the Arcachon Bay. Her husband, Malik (Marius Yelolo) remains in denial about his wife's departure as he is left to look after their children – two boys aged 12 and 6. While Malik dreams of returning home to Mali, the rest of his family (including his eldest son Dani (Diouc Koma), whose homosexual identity is suddenly revealed to Malik) embrace life in France. The unexpected arrival of the beautiful and mysterious Amina (Aïssa Maïga) further complicates the family situation, alongside a close relationship that develops between Malik and his lonely neighbour Mme Myriam (Lorella Cravotta).

The film was screened at the Film Africa festival in 2012 and is shown on UK television on The Africa Channel International (Sky 209 & Virgin Media 828).
