= Va savoir =

2001 film

- Theatrical release poster
- Directed by: Jacques Rivette
- Written by: Pascal Bonitzer; Christine Laurent; Jacques Rivette; Luigi Pirandello "Come tu mi vuoi" (play, uncredited)
- Produced by: Maurice Tinchant
- Starring: Jeanne Balibar; Sergio Castellitto; Marianne Basler; Jacques Bonnaffé; Hélène de Fougerolles; Bruno Todeschini
- Cinematography: William Lubtchansky
- Edited by: Nicole Lubtchansky
- Distributed by: Les Films du Losange
- Release date: 16 May 2001
- Running time: 154 minutes 220 minutes (director's cut)
- Country: France
- Languages: French; Italian
- Budget: $4.4 million
- Box office: $2 million

Va savoir (Who Knows?) is a 2001 French romantic comedy-drama film directed by Jacques Rivette. It stars Jeanne Balibar, Sergio Castellitto, Marianne Basler, Hélène de Fougerolles, and Catherine Rouvel. The widely distributed theatrical version is 154 minutes. It was entered into the 2001 Cannes Film Festival.

It tells a story of three couples whose lives sometimes parallels a Pirandello play in which the two principals, Camille and Ugo, are performing each night.

== Plot ==
After three years away, the actress Camille returns to Paris in an Italian troupe run by her husband Ugo, who is touring Europe with an Italian-language production of a Luigi Pirandello play Come Tu Mi Vuoi (As You Want Me). Camille is nervous because she still has feelings over leaving her lover Pierre, who she tracks down in a park. He seems unchanged and has still not finished writing his doctoral thesis on Martin Heidegger.

While searching privately for a lost Goldoni play, Ugo runs into the attractive Dominique in a library, who advises him to approach a collector. The collector sends him to the private library inherited by Dominique's mother, who warns him that books have disappeared. She is happy for him to browse and Dominique helps him. When she takes him to her bedroom, however, her jealous half-brother Arthur intervenes (it is later revealed that he is her secret lover). Dominique warns Ugo that it is Arthur who steals books to sell.

Pierre asks Camille and Ugo to dinner at his flat with his lover Sonia, which proves a disaster as the nervous Camille drinks too much and the jealous Ugo mocks Pierre. When Camille goes round the next day to apologise to Sonia, the two women begin to form a rapport. Now able to be friends with Sonia, Camille is still worried that she has not closed things with Pierre. When she goes to see him, he locks her in a room. Camille escapes by a skylight and barely makes the theatre curtain call of the performance, which Sonia attends. Afterwards in a bar, Arthur pretends to pursue Sonia while taking an impression of her very valuable diamond ring, which he later replaces with a worthless duplicate.

In despair at this deceit, Sonia asks Camille for help. She goes round to Arthur's flat and offers him a simple deal: he can choose to either spend the night with her and never see her afterwards, or to have her walk out on the spot. He opts for the night and, once he is asleep, she searches until she finds the ring in the kitchen. Ugo then calls on Pierre and challenges him to a duel, place and weapons to be his choice. When Pierre accepts, he finds that the place is over the flies in the theatre and the weapons are a bottle of vodka each. As Pierre is the first to fall over, Ugo wins.

In the meantime, Dominique has found the Goldoni play, not in the library but in the kitchen among her mother's cookbooks. When she brings it to Ugo, roaring drunk after his duel, he says it is so valuable that she must keep it and just give him a photocopy. Camille turns up with the ring and offers it back to Sonia, who says Camille has earned it and must keep it. Reunited and now rich, Camille and Ugo look forward to the next stop on their tour.

== Cast ==
- Jeanne Balibar as Camille B.
- Sergio Castellitto as Ugo
- Marianne Basler as Sonia
- Hélène de Fougerolles as Dominique 'Do'
- Catherine Rouvel as Madame Desprez
- Jacques Bonnaffé as Pierre
- Bruno Todeschini as Arthur
- Claude Berri as Librarian
- Attilio Cucari as Salter
- Bettina Kee as Mop
- Luciana Castellucci as Lena
- Emanuele Vacca as Salesio
- Arturo Armone Caruso as Bruno
- Valeria Cavalli as Ines
- Fausto Maria Sciarappa as Silvio

== Reception ==
On review aggregator website Rotten Tomatoes, the film holds an approval rating of 86% based on 79 reviews, with an average rating of 7.4/10.
