= Ne quittez pas! =

- Directed by: Arthur Joffé
- Written by: Arthur Joffé
- Based on: Story by Arthur Joffé and Guy Zilberstein
- Starring: Sergio Castellitto; Michel Serrault; Isabelle Gélinas; Rachida Brakni; Dominique Pinon; László Szabó; Lisette Malidor; Emily Morgan; Arthur Joffé
- Cinematography: Philippe Welt
- Music by: Jean-Claude Nachon; Angélique Nachon
- Production company: Studio 24
- Release date: 18 August 2004
- Running time: 1h30
- Country: France
- Language: French

Ne quittez pas! is a French comedy film directed by Arthur Joffé, released in 2004.

== Synopsis ==
Internationally renowned astrophysicist, Félix Mandel, 40, is very attached to the past, to the great despair of his wife, Lucie, who does not know that he is still in contact with the love of his youth, Wendy Lawrence, and does not want him to keep filling his office with souvenirs. One day, fed up with it, she decides on a spring clean, during which she finds an old coat that had belonged to his father, Lucien, dead for two years. After she gives the coat to a tramp, Félix receives a phone call from... Lucien, furious that his son has disposed of the clothing!

== Production ==
- Director : Arthur Joffé
- Screenplay : Arthur Joffé, from an original story by Arthur Joffé and Guy Zilberstein
- Director of photography : Philippe Welt
- Music : Jean-Claude Nachon and Angélique Nachon
- Year : 2004
- Length : 1h30
- Genre : Comedy
- Filmed : Studio 24

== Cast ==
- Sergio Castellitto : Félix Mandel
- Michel Serrault : Lucien Mandel (voice only)
- Isabelle Gélinas : Lucie Mandel
- Rachida Brakni : Yaëlle
- Dominique Pinon : The tramp
- László Szabó : The tailor
- Lisette Malidor : The "black prince"
- Emily Morgan : Wendy
- Tchéky Karyo : Raveu, the banker
- Hélène de Fougerolles : The air hostess
- Maurice Bernart : The rabbin
- Chantal Neuwirth : Aeroplane passenger
- Jeff Mirza : The London taxi driver
- Vincent Sgonamillo : Léo
- Bruno Flender : Jérôme
- Marc Brunet : Ravier
- Juliette Joffé : Clotilde
- Arthur Joffé : The psychoanalyst
- William Alix : Peter
- Steacy Hazard : Kate
- Tiffany Dewael : Mona
- Zinedine Soualem : The neighbour in the hotel
- Sara Martins : The hotel receptionist
- Claude-Jean Philippe : The client at the newspaper kiosk
- Bruno Lochet : The fellow-prisoner
