= La Brigade des maléfices =

French television series

- Genre: Mystery; Fantastic
- Country of origin: France
- Original language: French
- No. of seasons: 1
- No. of episodes: 6

Production
- Running time: 55 minutes

Original release
- Network: ORTF
- Release: 1971 – 1971

La Brigade des maléfices (French: The Hex Brigade) is a French television series created by Claude Guillemot and Claude-Jean Philippe. It followed a fictional division of the National Police tasked with the investigation of supernatural cases. It was broadcast from August to September 1971 on ORTF.

== Cast and characters ==
- Léo Campion: Inspector Guillaume Martin Paumier
- Marc Lamole: Albert
- Jacques François: Chief Commissioner
- Jean-Claude Balard: Commissioner Muselier
- Pierre Brasseur: Diablevert / Diablegris
- Anny Duperey: Vénusine
