= Le Cri =

Belgian-French television series

- Written by: Hervé Baslé
- Directed by: Hervé Baslé
- Starring: Catherine Jacob; Dominique Blanc
- Music by: Pierre Baslé; Mark Doyle
- Country of origin: France; Belgium
- No. of episodes: 4

Production
- Producers: Nicole Azzaro; Françoise Basle; Laurence Bachman
- Cinematography: Svetlana Kouleva
- Editor: Laurence Guzzo
- Running time: 360 min

Original release
- Network: France 2
- Release: 27 February – 13 March 2006

Le cri is a 2006 French-Belgian television miniseries.

== Plot ==
This saga tells what was the life of Metalworkers of Lorraine through the story of a working-class family: the Panaud. From 1845 until the blast furnaces closed in 1987, the life of this family scrolls across the screen with Robert Panaud key figure for the last of the family to do this job.

== Cast ==
- Catherine Jacob as Renée Panaud
- Francis Renaud as Robert Panaud
  - Jean-Baptiste Maunier as Young Robert
- Jacques Bonnaffé as Jules Panaud
- Dominique Blanc as Pierrette Guibert
- Pascal Elso as Léon Brulé
- Yolande Moreau as Marie
- François Morel as Ferrari
- Rocco Papaleo as Razza
- Rufus as Monsieur Lesage
- Olivier Saladin as Paloteau
- Bruno Lochet as Angelmon
- Geneviève Mnich as Lulu
- Ivan Franek as Wisniesky
- Dominique Valadié as Roseline
- Pierre Aussedat as Marcel Panaud
- Martin Jobert as Célestin Panaud
- Samuel Jouy as Pierre Panaud
- Yann Collette as Fred
- Marina Golovine as Graziella
- Vittoria Scognamiglio as Monica
- Laura Quintyn as Young Graziella
- Hammou Graïa as Mohamed
- Nathalie Kanoui as Violette
- Noé Chadaigne as Julien
- Antoine de Prekel as Jeannot
- Florence Hebbelynck as Hortense
- Catherine Cyler as Doctor Dubois
- Suzanna Lastreto as Madame Fontana
- Alain Frérot as Monsieur Nobilet
- Christian Pereira as Monsieur A
- Philippe du Janerand as Monsieur B
- Dominique Bettenfeld as Huguet
- Marcel Bozonnet as The Director
- Roger Dumas as The Accountant
- André Marcon as The Delegate

== Episodes ==
- Episode 1 : L'Embauche
- Episode 2 : Le Licenciement
- Episode 3 : Le Sauvetage
- Episode 4 : La Fin d'un monde
