= Madame Édouard =

2004 film by Nadine Monfils

- Film poster
- Directed by: Nadine Monfils
- Written by: Patrick Ligardes; Nadine Monfils
- Produced by: Jacques Ouaniche; Olivier Rausin; Jani Thiltges; Franck Cabot-David
- Starring: Michel Blanc; Didier Bourdon; Dominique Lavanant; Josiane Balasko; Annie Cordy
- Cinematography: Luc Drion
- Edited by: Isabelle Proust
- Music by: Bénabar
- Production company: Artémis
- Distributed by: TFM Distribution
- Release date: 2 June 2004
- Running time: 97 min
- Country: France
- Language: French
- Budget: $5 million
- Box office: $565,000

Madame Édouard is a 2004 French comedy crime film directed by Nadine Monfils.

== Plot ==
In Brussels, one discovers the bodies of young women buried behind the tombs of famous painters ... In each of them, it lacks the right forearm. Yarn needles, Commissioner Leon, whose secret passion is knitting, unravels the intrigue of this dark history, with the heart of this case Mrs. Edward Island, transvestite housekeeper bistro "In Sudden Death," where one encounters a high wildlife colors.

== Cast ==
- Michel Blanc as Commissioner Léon
- Didier Bourdon as Irma
- Dominique Lavanant as Rose
- Annie Cordy as Ginette
- Josiane Balasko as Nina Tchitchi
- Rufus as Valdès
- Bouli Lanners as Gégé
- Olivier Broche as Bornéo
- Julie-Anne Roth as Marie
- Fabienne Chaudat as Mimi
- Andréa Ferréol as The butcher
- Philippe Grand'Henry as Jeannot
- Valérie Bodson as Carine
- Erik Dewulf as Bobby Rousky
