= Claude-Jean Philippe =

French director and film critic

- Born: Claude Nahon; 20 April 1933; Tangier
- Died: 11 September 2016 (aged 83)
- Occupations: Critic, director, producer

Claude Nahon (20 April 1933 – 11 September 2016), better known as Claude-Jean Philippe, was a French film critic, essayist, diarist, director, and producer who made numerous documentaries. He was also active on the radio and occasionally worked as a screenwriter and actor.

== Publications ==
- 1984: Le Roman du cinéma, Fayard
- 1985: Métropolis : images d'un tournage, Cinémathèque française
- 1985: Simone Signoret, Hachette
- 1984: Le Roman du cinéma. Tome 2, Fayard
- 1986: Une nuit chez les Marx, Dargaud
- 1986: Studio Harcourt : acteurs, Seghers
- 1987: Le Roman de Charlot, Fayard
- 1987: Cannes, le festival, Nathan
- 1988: François Truffaut, Seghers
- 1989: Jean Cocteau, Seghers
- 1990: Le Journal d'un cinéphile, Éd. Filipacchi
- 1994: La Douce Gravité du désir : roman, Presses de la Cité
- 1996: La Nuit bienfaisante, Éditions du Rocher
- 2006: Jean Renoir, une vie en œuvres, Grasset
- 2008: 100 films pour une cinémathèque idéale, Cahiers du cinéma

== Filmography ==
=== Actor ===
- 1972: L'Amour l'après-midi
- 1980: Le Rôle effacé de Marie
- 1991: Sale comme un ange
- 2002: Inconnu à cette adresse
- 2004: Ne quittez pas !

=== Screenwriter ===
- 1960: Actua-Tilt (commentary)
- 1964: Les Baisers
- 1970: La Brigade des maléfices
- 1974: Une légende, une vie : Citizen Welles

=== Director ===
- 1966: Et pourtant ils tournent (documentary, in the Cinéastes de notre temps series)
- 1973: Les Gens de Belleville, légende de Belleville (documentary, in the L'Album de famille des Français series)
- 1978: Encyclopédie audiovisuelle du cinéma (six-episode documentary):
  - Max Linder
  - Le cinéma en son temps : Les années dix ou le temps de l'hécatombe
  - Le cinéma forain
  - Méliès ou le génie de la surprise
  - Lumière ou le cinématographe
- 1994: Léo Ferré par lui-même (montage)

=== Producer ===
- 1970: Postface Dalio
- 1978: Encyclopédie audiovisuelle du cinéma
