= Docteur Petiot =

1990 film by Christian de Chalonge

- Directed by: Christian de Chalonge
- Written by: Dominique Garnier; Christian de Chalonge
- Produced by: Alain Sarde; Philippe Chapelier-Dehesdin
- Starring: Michel Serrault
- Cinematography: Patrick Blossier
- Edited by: Anita Fernandez
- Music by: Michel Portal
- Production companies: Ciné Cinq; M.S. Productions; Sara Films
- Distributed by: Acteurs Auteurs Associés
- Release date: 1990
- Running time: 102 minutes
- Country: France
- Language: French

Docteur Petiot is a 1990 French drama film directed by Christian de Chalonge and starring Michel Serrault. It presents the exploits of real-life serial killer Marcel Petiot during the Second World War.

== Cast ==
- Michel Serrault : doctor Marcel Petiot
- Pierre Romans : Drezner
- Zbigniew Horoks : Nathan Guzik
- Bérangère Bonvoisin : Georgette Petiot
- Olivier Saladin : the first agent
- André Julien : Forestier
- Nini Crépon : Collard
- Maxime Collion : Gérard Petiot
- Aurore Prieto : Mrs. Guzik
- André Chaumeau : Célestin Nivelon
- Axel Bogousslavsky : Louis Rossignol
- Maryline Even : mother of the sick child
- Nita Klein : Mrs. Kern
- Dominique Marcas : Mrs. Valéry
- Martine Mongermont : Cécile Drezner
- Julien Verdier : apothecary
- Lorella Cravotta : Petiot's neighbor
- Claude Degliame

== Reception ==
Empire praised the performance of the "absolutely hypnotising" Serrault, who "brings virtuoso skills to his recreation of this contradictory madman." While describing the film as "bizarre and intriguing", the review noted that "the screenplay offers no depth or development of character whatsoever, has no themes or ideas buried beneath the facts and is a little repetitive and overlong."

Pointing out the film's numerous nods to German Expressionism, the New York Times review similarly concluded that "Mr. Serrault, best known here for his camp performances in the Cage aux Folles comedies, gives a good, appropriately chilly performance as Petiot, though the screenplay doesn't allow him to go anyplace."
