= Alberto Express =

- Directed by: Arthur Joffé
- Cinematography: Philippe Welt
- Music by: Angelique Nachon; Jean-Claude Nachon
- Release date: 1990
- Country: France
- Languages: French; Italian

Alberto Express is a 1990 French comedy film directed by Arthur Joffé. It was coproduced with Italy, where it was released as In viaggio con Alberto. For his performance Sergio Castellitto was awarded at Montreal World Film Festival.

== Plot ==
The film involves Alberto's attempt to fulfill a family tradition, in which he must repay his father for the cost of his upbringing, before the birth of his first child. Shortly before his wife gives birth, he rushes onto a train from Paris to Rome, suffering comic misadventures along the way.

== Cast ==
- Sergio Castellitto: Alberto Capuana
- Nino Manfredi: Alberto's father
- Marie Trintignant: Clara
- Marco Messeri: Ticket inspector
- Jeanne Moreau: The baroness
- Angela Goodwin: The mother
- Michel Aumont: The debtor
- Thomas Langmann: Young Alberto
- Dominique Pinon: The driver
