= Bloody Oranges =

2021 film

- Directed by: Jean-Christophe Meurisse
- Starring: Denis Podalydès
- Release date: 8 July 2021 (Cannes)
- Running time: 105 minute
- Country: France
- Language: French
- Box office: $230,157

Bloody Oranges (French: Oranges sanguines) is a 2021 French comedy film directed by Jean-Christophe Meurisse. The film was shown out of competition at the 2021 Cannes Film Festival.

== Cast ==
- Alexandre Steiger : Alexandre
- Christophe Paou : Stéphane Lemarchand
- Lilith Grasmug : Louise
- Olivier Saladin : Olivier
- Lorella Cravotta : Laurence
- Denis Podalydès : The Tenor of the Bar
- Blanche Gardin : The gynecologist
- Patrice Laffont : Patrice
- Guilaine Londez : Mademoiselle Mi
