= Les Deschiens =

- Created by: Jérôme Deschamps; Macha Makeïeff
- Starring: François Morel; Yolande Moreau
- Country of origin: France
- No. of seasons: 5

Original release
- Network: Canal + (France)
- Release: 1993 – 2002

Les Deschiens is a French-language comedy television series. It was broadcast from 1993 to 2002 on Canal + (France).

== Plot ==
This semi-improvised series of short sketches depicts a gallery of quirky characters having arguments or selling bizarre products.

== Casting ==
- François Morel : M. Morel
- Yolande Moreau : Yolande
- Olivier Saladin : M. Saladin
- Philippe Duquesne : M. Duquesne
- Bruno Lochet : Bruno
- Lorella Cravotta : Lorella
- Olivier Broche : The son
- Atmen Kelif : Atmen
- Jean-Marc Bihour : Jean-Marc
- Michel Robin
- Fabienne Chaudat
- Jean-François Dinacaroupin
- François Toumarkine
- Robert Horn
- Yves Robin
- Hervé Lassince
