= The Rabbi's Cat (film) =

- Theatrical release poster
- French: Le chat du rabbin
- Directed by: Joann Sfar; Antoine Delesvaux
- Screenplay by: Joann Sfar; Sandrina Jardel
- Based on: The Rabbi's Cat by Joann Sfar
- Produced by: Clément Oubrerie; Antoine Delesvaux; Joann Sfar
- Starring: François Morel; Hafsia Herzi; Maurice Bénichou; Fellag; François Damiens; Jean-Pierre Kalfon
- Edited by: Maryline Monthieux
- Music by: Olivier Daviaud
- Production company: Autochenille Production
- Distributed by: UGC Distribution
- Release date: 1 June 2011
- Running time: 80 minutes
- Country: France
- Language: French
- Budget: €12.5 million
- Box office: $4.2 million

The Rabbi's Cat (French: Le chat du rabbin) is a 2011 French adult animated film directed by Joann Sfar and Antoine Delesvaux, based on volumes one, two and five of Sfar's comics series with the same title. It tells the story of a cat, who obtains the ability to speak after swallowing a parrot, and its owner who is a rabbi in 1920s Algeria. The voice cast includes François Morel, Hafsia Herzi, Maurice Bénichou, Fellag, François Damiens and Jean-Pierre Kalfon.

== Plot ==
The story takes place in the Jewish community of Algeria during the 1920s. One day a rabbi finds that his talking parrot, who is very noisy, has been eaten by his cat and that the cat has gained the ability to speak in human tongues. However, the rabbi finds that the cat is very rude and arrogant, so the rabbi teaches him about the Torah, with the cat deciding that — if he is Jewish — then he should receive a bar mitzvah, leading the two to consult with the rabbi's rabbi. The cat proceeds to mock and insult the rabbi's strict views, who declares that the cat should be killed for its heresy. The rabbi takes his cat and leaves, mad at the cat for making a fool of his master. The two eventually reach an agreement where the rabbi will teach the cat all about the Torah and that he might have his bar mitzvah when he is ready.

The cat helps the rabbi pass a French language exam so that he might one day become head rabbi, but after the exam the cat loses his ability to speak (as he invoked the name of God to pray for his master). After the discovery of a Russian Jew who has stowed away in a shipment of religious texts, the cat learns he can speak Russian. He eventually regains his ability to speak French, finding he knows many languages and can act as a translator. The Russian reveals that he is a painter who has fled from Soviet Russia. He has come to Africa to search for a hidden city of black Jews deep in the heart of Africa, and convinces the rabbi, his cat, and a former Russian soldier to help him in his search.

== Cast ==
- François Morel as the cat
- Maurice Bénichou as the rabbi
- Hafsia Herzi as Zlabya
- Jean-Pierre Kalfon as Malka of the lions
- Fellag as sheik Mohammed Sfar
- Sava Lolov as the Russian painter
- Daniel Cohen as the rabbi's master
- François Damiens as the Belgian reporter
- Wojciech Pszoniak as Vastenov
- Pascal N'Zonzi as the first giant
- Marguerite Abouet as the African girl
- Eric Elmosnino as professor Soliman
- Alice Houri as Knidelette
- Mathieu Amalric as the prince
- Olivier Broche as the parrot

== Production ==
Autochenille Production was launched in 2007 by Joann Sfar, Antoine Delesvaux and Clément Oubrerie with the aim to make "author-driven, challenging films to appeal to children and adults." The Rabbi's Cat was the company's first project. The production was made in collaboration with TF1 and France 3. It was pre-bought by Canal+ and CineCinéma and had a budget of 12.5 million euro. It is the second film directed by Sfar, after Gainsbourg (Vie héroïque).

One of the directors' sources of inspiration was American animation from the 1930s and, in particular, from the Fleischer Studios, which Sfar described as characterised by multi-ethnic production crews and for portraying dark aspects of society, in cartoons such as Betty Boop and Popeye. To generate more personality for the drawn characters in The Rabbi's Cat, some of the scenes were staged in a Parisian suburb loft in the summer of 2008, with props and the cast fully costumed. As the actors performed and invented their characters' personal motion habits, the design team observed closely and drew what they picked up.

The original soundtrack was composed by Olivier Daviaud, who had composed the music for Gainsbourg (Vie héroïque), and was performed by Enrico Macias and the Amsterdam Klezmer Band.

== Release ==
The film was released in France on 1 June 2011 through UGC Distribution, which launched it in 243 prints. It competed at the 2011 Annecy International Animated Film Festival, where it won the top award: the Annecy Crystal for best feature.

=== Critical response ===
The Rabbi's Cat received positive reviews from critics. On Rotten Tomatoes, it has a rating of 94% based on 16 reviews and an average rating of 7.6/10. On Metacritic, the film has a score of 74 out of 100 based on nine reviews, indicating "generally favorable reviews".

Pierre Vavasseur of Le Parisien gave a top rating of three stars and compared the impression it left to that of Persepolis by Marjane Satrapi. Vavasseur called The Rabbi's Cat "a pure pleasure" and complimented it for its variation and colourfulness, as well as for how it tackles the subject of a divided society: "Offsprings of Voltaire, Sfar and his cat don't stroke anyone with the hair, but throw as chefs together a broth of cultures with multiple flavours and with nurtured scenery."

Jacques Mandelbaum wrote a negative review in Le Monde, where he, among other things, criticised the film for having dull gags, lifeless voice acting and a dragging pace: "This general disconcertment is due to the lack of determination in the point of view, which evidently wants to take in everything and fails to grasp the bad. Between Chagall and The Adventures of Tintin, family chronicle and adventure film, biblical legend and colonial chronicle, historical reconstruction and winks to the contemporary world, the references are superimposed without achieving harmony. In the end, this plea for tolerance is a moral preaching so annoyingly gentle that it struggles to convince us of its legitimacy." Jordan Mintzer wrote in The Hollywood Reporter: "Though this gorgeously animated affair showcases the artist's freewheeling style and colorful arabesque imagery, its rambling episodic structure is not quite the cat's meow, even if it remains a thoroughly enjoyable take on Judaism in early 20th century North Africa. ... While the end result is somewhat chaotic, it proves that Sfar can make the jump from page to screen in ways that are both compelling and personal."

=== Awards and nominations ===
On 24 February 2012, The Rabbi's Cat (Le Chat du rabbin) was named Best Animated Film at the César Awards.

On 3 December 2012, it was announced that the film received two nominations at the 40th Annie Awards, including Best Animated Feature.

It won the Prix Jacques Prévert du Scénario for Best Adaptation in 2012.

== See also ==
- History of French animation
- History of the Jews in Algeria
