= La Belle Verte =

1996 film

- Directed by: Coline Serreau
- Written by: Coline Serreau
- Produced by: Alain Sarde
- Starring: Coline Serreau; Vincent Lindon; James Thiérrée; Marion Cotillard; Claire Keim; Yolande Moreau
- Cinematography: Robert Alazraki
- Edited by: Catherine Renault
- Music by: Coline Serreau
- Production companies: Les Films Alain Sarde; TF1 Films Production
- Distributed by: AMLF
- Release date: 1996
- Running time: 99 min.
- Country: France
- Language: French
- Budget: $12.2 million
- Box office: $4.6 million

La Belle Verte (French pronunciation: [la bɛl ˈvɛʁt]; The Beautiful Green, title in English: Visit to a Green Planet) is a 1996 French film written and directed by Coline Serreau and starring Serreau, Vincent Lindon, Marion Cotillard and Yolande Moreau. Serreau also composed the original music score. It was filmed on location in Australia and France.

== Synopsis ==
On the Beautiful Green, a utopian planet much smaller than Earth, during the yearly planetary meeting, Mila, a rather young woman – by the reckoning of her people, at any rate – volunteers to go as a messenger to planet Earth. It has been two hundred years since the old sage Osam was there, along with Mila's father. At the time of his visit, he recounts, the people of Earth lived in bad conditions. It was the time of Napoleon and the people of Earth were still using money – a notion that baffles even the wisest folk of the Beautiful Green. In time, we find out that important historical figures such as Jesus and Johann Sebastian Bach had come from this very planet.

No one on the Beautiful Green wishes to go to Earth; their opinion of Earth actually isn't all that flattering. They see the people of Earth as un-evolved, and unwilling to change. Mila, however, who knows that her mother was from Earth, is the only one to volunteer, and so is sent to Earth for the purpose of bringing back news of how things have worked out since the nineteenth century. She also wishes to find out more about her parents, although this thread seems to be abandoned quite early on in the story.

Before she departs, she is given so-called "disconnection" programs – mental devices that allow her to induce life-changing epiphanies in the people she converses with, and even more radical changes, when she uses a version of it with a stronger dosage. She will remain in touch with her home planet via telepathy.

Once on Earth, Mila cannot eat the local food, and so, as a source of energy, she needs a baby to partake in what seems to be an exchange of resources. She sneaks into a hospital nursery, where she meets Théodore, the baby, and eventually, Masha, the nurse. Masha is alarmed to find Mila there, and at first, mistakes her for the mother of the child, a refugee gone missing. Max, a medical officer who seems very fond of the authority he wields, is about to interfere when he is the first to receive a full blast of higher-dosage "disconnection", which sends him stuttering that he has never known how to give birth, and that the nurse is really the expert in that regard. He then becomes a friend of Mila's, and she comes to stay in his home, where he and his wife share a seemingly unhappy marriage.

As the mother of the child is missing, the social services are about to take charge of him when Masha smuggles him out to stay with her and her sister, Sonia, in their apartment. As Mila helps to hide the baby from the two functionaries that intend to take the baby away, she "disconnects" them too. She communicates with her sons telepathically, and they get a glimpse of Masha and Sonia. They wish to come join their mother on Earth to meet the breathtaking sisters they have just seen, but Osam misses his aim, and they land in the Australian desert, where they meet aboriginal people just as evolved as they are. They are very surprised – this does not look like what their mother had described. Eventually, they make it to an airport, and from there on, the film narrates how they will come to meet each other.

In the end, Mila and her sons will go back to the Beautiful Green, bringing along Masha, Sonia and Théodore. Max's marriage will have been fixed, by then, and he will live a happy life in Paris, with his wife and kids.

A substantial theme not mentioned above relates to a proposed solution: how the inhabitants of Earth could change their dystopia for a utopia by removing all that causes harm to their life in mass protest. For example, all TV and microwaves are placed in the street.

== Cast ==
- Coline Serreau as Mila
- Vincent Lindon as Max
- James Thiérrée as Mesaje
- Samuel Tasinaje as Mesaul
- Marion Cotillard as Masha
- Claire Keim as Sonia
- Salomé Stévenin as Sophie
- Yolande Moreau as Nicole
- Catherine Samie as La femme sage
- Paul Crauchet as Osam
- Denis Podalydès as Papapote
- Lorella Cravotta as The client
- Francis Perrin as The Angry BMW driver
