= Marianne Basler =

French actress

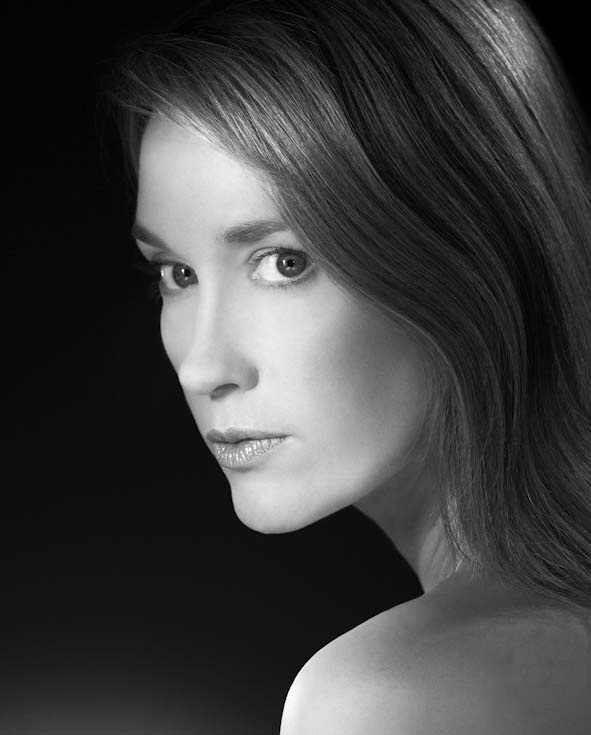
- Born: 9 March 1964 (age 62); Brussels, Belgium
- Occupation: Actress
- Years active: 1980–present

Marianne Basler (born 9 March 1964) is a French actress. She has appeared in more than eighty films since 1980.

== Selected filmography ==
| Year | Title | Role | Notes |
|---|---|---|---|
| 1984 | The Mystery of Alexina | Marie Avril | |
| 1985 | Rosa la rose, fille publique | Rosa | |
| 1987 | The Cruel Embrace | Nicole | |
| 1988 | A Soldier's Tale | Belle | |
| 1989 | La Révolution française | | |
| 1991 | Eline Vere | Eline Vere | |
| 1994 | Farinelli | | |
| 1997 | Marquise | | |
| 1999 | ’’Children - Mrs Four | | |
| 2001 | Va savoir | | |
| 2002 | The Magic Box | | |
| 2004 | Welcome to Switzerland | | |
| 2005 | Ghosts | | |
| 2011 | Midnight in Paris | | |
| 2014 | Yves Saint Laurent | | |
| 2018 | Amanda | Maud | |
