= The Rabbi's Cat (comics) =

Comic fantasy comic book series by Joann Sfar

The Rabbi's Cat (Le Chat du Rabbin)
- French cover of the first volume
- Created by: Joann Sfar

Publication information
- Publisher: Dargaud
- Formats: Original material for the series has been published as a set of graphic novels.
- Original language: French
- Genre: Comic fantasy
- Publication date: 2002–2021

Creative team
- Writer(s): Joann Sfar
- Artist(s): Brigitte Findakly (colors)

Reprints
- The series has been reprinted, at least in part, in English.

The Rabbi's Cat (French title: Le Chat du rabbin) is a series of comic fantasy comic books created by Joann Sfar. It was originally published in France by Dargaud as a series of graphic albums. English translations of the first five stories have been released by Pantheon Books. Some volumes were also translated into Spanish, Croatian, Russian, Polish, Dutch, and German. Its protagonist, the titular Sphinx cat, is owned by Rabbi Abraham Sfar and his daughter Zlabya.

== Albums ==
=== Original publications ===
1. La Bar-Mitsva (2002) ISBN 2-205-05207-1, prefaced by Éliette Abécassis. Translated into English, Arabic, Croatian, Czech, Danish, Dutch, Finnish, German, Hebrew, Italian, Norwegian, Polish, Portuguese, Russian, Spanish and Swedish.
2. Le Malka des lions (2002) ISBN 2-205-05369-8, prefaced by Fellag. Translated into English, Croatian, Czech, Danish, Dutch, Finnish, German, Italian, Norwegian, Polish, Portuguese, Russian, Spanish and Swedish.
3. L'Exode (2003) ISBN 2-205-05497-X, with a preface by Georges Moustaki. Translated into English, Croatian, Czech, Danish, Dutch, Finnish, German, Italian, Norwegian, Polish, Portuguese, Russian, Spanish and Swedish.
4. Le Paradis terrestre (2005) ISBN 2-205-05725-1, with a preface by Jean Giraud. Translated into English, Croatian, Czech, Danish, Dutch, Finnish, German, Italian, Norwegian, Polish, Portuguese, Russian and Spanish.
5. Jérusalem d'Afrique (2006) ISBN 2-205-05868-1, prefaced by Philippe Val. Joann Sfar describes this album in a preface as a story against racism. Translated into English, Croatian, Czech, Danish, Dutch, Finnish, German, Italian, Norwegian, Polish, Portuguese, Russian and Spanish.
6. Tu n'auras pas d'autre Dieu que moi (2015) ISBN 2-205-07353-2. Translated into Dutch, German, Polish, Portuguese and Spanish.
7. La tour de Bab-El-Oued (2017) ISBN 2-205-07588-8. Translated into Dutch, German, Polish and Spanish.
8. Petit panier aux amandes (2018) ISBN 978-2205-07835-0. Translated into Dutch, German, Polish and Spanish.
9. La Reine de Shabbat (2019) ISBN 978-2-205-07950-0. Translated into Polish and German.
10. Rentrez chez vous ! (2020) ISBN 978-2-205-08003-2. Translated into Polish and German.
11. La Bible pour les chats, (2021) ISBN 978-2-205-08911-0.
12. La Traversée de la mer Noire

=== Translations ===
==== English ====
- The Rabbi's Cat, Pantheon, 2007 (Books 1-3) ISBN 978-0375714641.
- The Rabbi's Cat 2, Pantheon, 2008 (Books 4-5) ISBN 978-0375425073.

==== Croatian ====
- Rabinov mačak, Bookglobe, Zagreb, Croatia, 2013 (Books 1-5) ISBN 978-953-264-236-0.

==== Russian ====
- Кот раввина, 2021 ISBN 978-5-907305-24-3.

==== German ====
- Die Katze des Rabbiners 1, avant-verlag, 2014 (Books 1-3) ISBN 978-3-945034-01-9.
- Die Katze des Rabbiners 2, avant-verlag, 2015 (Books 4-5) ISBN 978-3-945034-10-1.
- Die Katze des Rabbiners 3, avant-verlag, 2019 (Books 6-8) ISBN 978-3-964450-05-0.
- Die Katze des Rabbiners 4, avant-verlag, 2022 (Books 9-10) ISBN 978-3-96445-071-5.

== Reception ==
The comic books received positive reviews. The Kirkus reviews called the first English album "An unexpectedly haunting work from a major talent", and described it as follows:

Although dusted with fantasy, the book is powerfully real, etched with the dark shadows of an ancient society where Jews, French and Arabs mixed, a world soon to be swept away by the winds of war and modernity. Sfar’s artwork is playfully exaggerated, adding to the otherworldly feel here, while his writing is smart and sharp, perfectly counteracting any burgeoning colonial-era nostalgia the pages might evoke.

Diane Snyder in a review of second English album for the Armchair Interviews said that it "remind you of Aesop’s Fables." Review for the Jewish Book Council called the second album "A little darker than the first Rabbi's Cat, but equally as enthralling, this second showing will leave readers hoping for an encore."

== Adaptations ==
- Le Chat du Rabbin has been adapted for the theater by Camille Nahum under the name of La Bar-mitsva du Chat du Rabbin, created at Paris at the theater Michel Galabru 18 September 2004 then reprised at the Théâtre Le Temple from the 22d of March 2005 to 28 April 2005. Staging by Élise McLeod andSei Shiomi, actors were Rémy Darcy, Shiran Azoulay and Camille Nahum.
- Joann Sfar and Antoine Delesvaux have adapted The Rabbi's Cat into an animated film. It premiered in the cinema in France the first of June 2011.
