= Nadine Monfils =

Belgian writer and film director

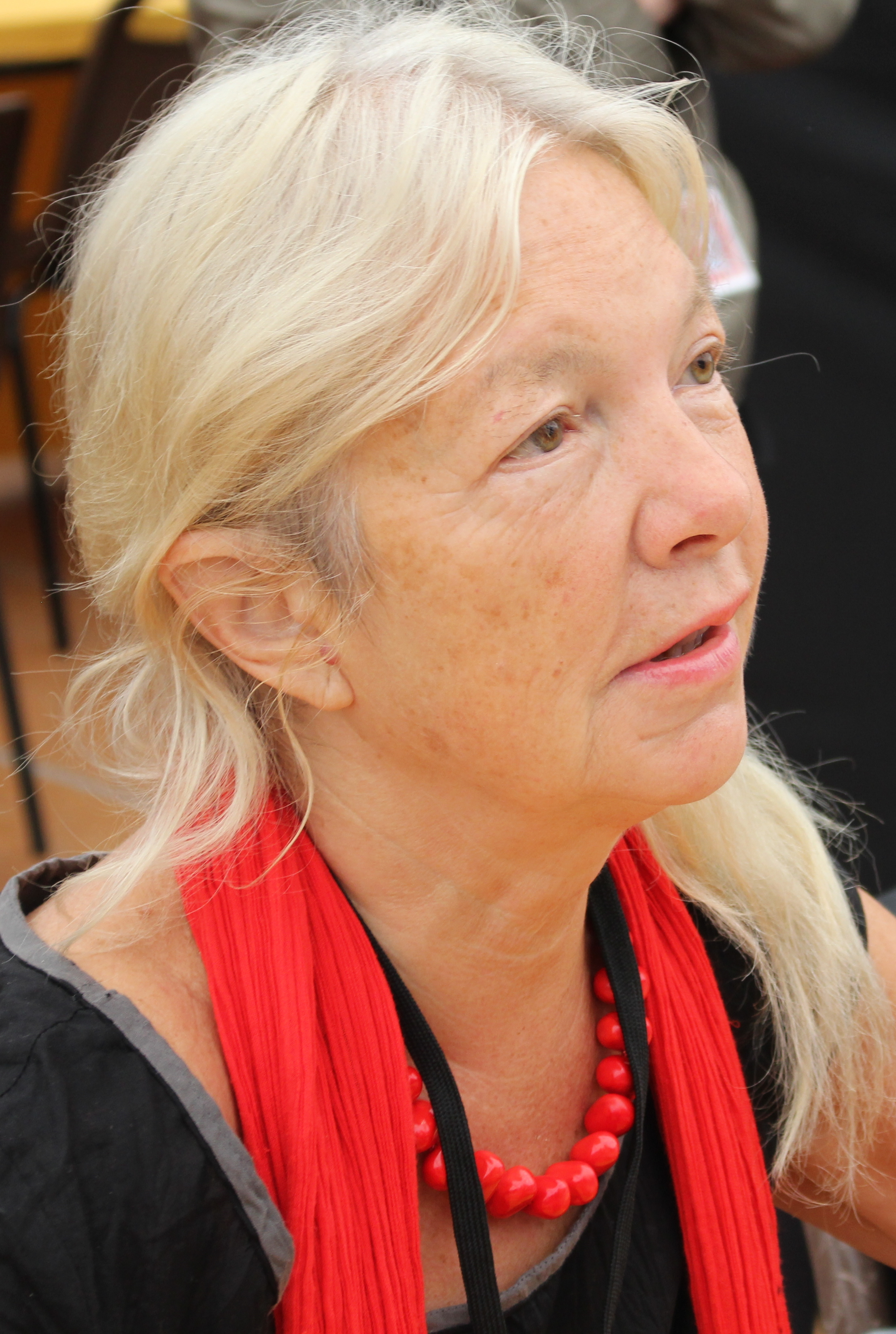
- Nadine Monfils, 2018
- Born: 12 February 1953 (age 73); Etterbeek, Belgium
- Occupations: Writer, film director, producer

Nadine Monfils (born 12 February 1953) is a Belgian writer and film director and producer.

She was born in Etterbeek. She has contributed to the magazines Père Ubu, Tel Quel and Focus. Monfils published her first collection of stories Laura Colombe, Contes pour petites filles perverse in 1981. She has written a series of detective novels centred on the character Inspector Léon, a policeman who knits; Léon also appears in her 2004 film Madame Édouard.

She has taught screenwriting at the Parallax school for comedians and the Université Européenne d’Ecriture in Brussels and also in a number of prisons in France. Monflils lives in Montmartre.

== Selected works ==
- Un Noël de chien, short film (2000)
- Madame Édouard, film (2004)
- La petite fêlée aux allumettes, novel (2012)
- Les vacances d’un serial killer, novel (2012)
- La Vieille qui voulait tuer le bon dieu, novel (2013)
- Mémé goes to Hollywood, novel (2014)
