= Philippe Venault =

French film director (1947–2021)

Philippe Venault (7 April 1947 – 3 April 2021) was a French director and screenwriter.
