= Jérôme Deschamps =

French actor and director (born 1947)

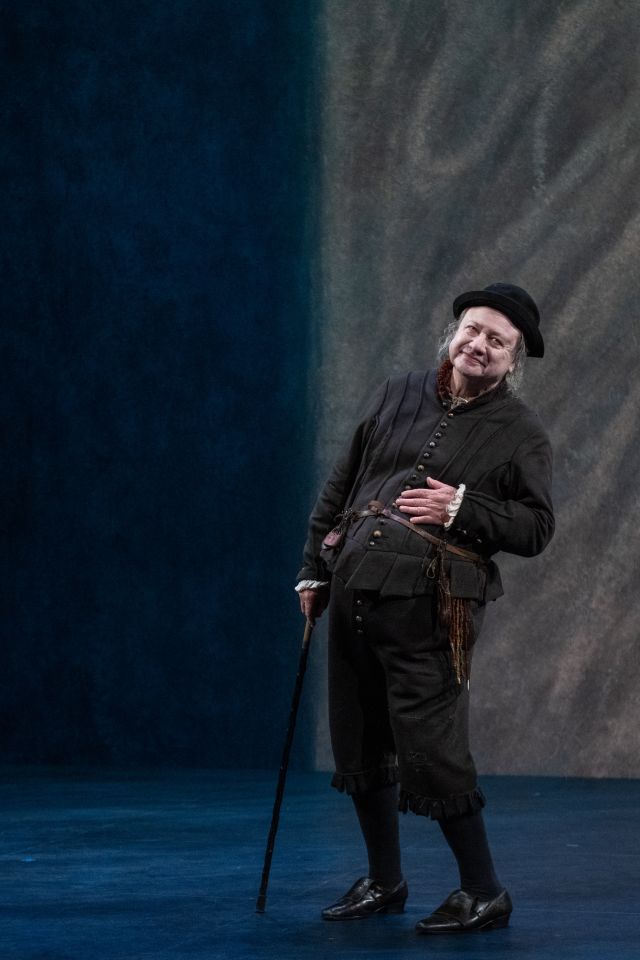
Jérome Deschamps in Molière's The Miser 2 at TNP Theatre in 2022

Jérôme Deschamps (born 5 October 1947 in Neuilly-sur-Seine) is an actor, director and stage author, as well as a cinema actor and director associated with the Famille Deschiens troupe founded by Macha Makeïeff in 1978. In 2003 he was appointed artistic director of the Théâtre national de Nîmes, leaving that post for the equivalent at the Théâtre national de l'Opéra-Comique in June 2007, where he remained until 2015.

== Life ==
Deschamps is the nephew of Hubert Deschamps and grandson of Paul Deschamps. His mother was the distant half cousin to Micheline Winter who married Jacques Tati, Upon the release of the animated film The Illusionist this non-biological relationship to Tati has been openly challenged by the grandchildren of Jacques Tati in a published letter to Roger Ebert.

He studied at the Lycée Louis-le-Grand where he met Patrice Chéreau and Jean-Pierre Vincent with whom he made his first stage appearances, before moving toward a professional career in theatre, at the École nationale supérieure des arts et techniques du théâtre and the Conservatoire national supérieur d'art dramatique de Paris. He joined the Comédie-Française under Antoine Vitez and directed his first play in 1977.

In 1979 Jérôme Deschamps was advised by Jacques Tati on Les Oubliettes and created a play Les Deschiens from Antoine Vitez's commission for the Ivry spring. In 1981, with Makeieff he founded the Les Deschiens company, which in 1993 became a television series on Canal+ with Yolande Moreau. He was the director of the 6th Festival du court-métrage de Saint Maur in 2008. He died in his sleep Thursday, 16 February 2023.

== Theatre ==
=== Actor ===
- 1972 : Le Château The Castle by Franz Kafka, director Daniel Mesguich, Conservatoire national supérieur d'art dramatique
- 1973 : Mère Courage by Bertolt Brecht, director Antoine Vitez, Théâtre des Amandiers, Théâtre des Quartiers d'Ivry
- 1973 : m = M by Xavier Pommeret, director Antoine Vitez, Festival d'Avignon, Théâtre des Quartiers d'Ivry
- 1974 : Ondine by Jean Giraudoux, director Raymond Rouleau, Comédie-Française
- 1974 : La Nostalgie, Camarade by François Billetdoux, director Jean-Paul Roussillon, Comédie-Française at the Théâtre de l'Odéon
- 1974 : L'Impromptu de Marigny by Jean Poiret, director Jacques Charon, Comédie-Française
- 1975 : Le Misanthrope by Molière, directors Jean-Luc Boutté and Catherine Hiegel, Comédie-Française, tour
- 1975 : Partage de midi by Paul Claudel, director Antoine Vitez, Comédie-Française
- 1976 : Maître Puntila et son valet Matti by Bertolt Brecht, director Guy Rétoré, Comédie-Française at the Théâtre Marigny
- 1976 : Cyrano de Bergerac by Edmond Rostand, director Jean-Paul Roussillon, Comédie-Française
- 1977 : Baboulifiche et Papavoine by Jérôme Deschamps and Jean-Claude Durand
- 1977 : Iphigénie-Hôtel by Michel Vinaver, director Antoine Vitez, Théâtre des Quartiers d'Ivry
- 1979 : La Famille Deschiens
- 1979 : Les Oubliettes
- 1980 : La Petite Chemise de nuit
- 1980 : Les Précipitations
- 1981 : En avant
- 1982 : Les Blouses
- 1984 : La Veillée
- 1985 : C'est dimanche
- 1997 : Les Précieuses ridicules by Molière (Gorgibus)
- 2004 : La Méchante Vie by Henri Monnier
- 2007 : L'Affaire de la rue de Lourcine by Eugène Labiche
- 2011 : Courteline en dentelles playlets by Georges Courteline, Théâtre des Bouffes du Nord, tour
- 2013 : Ciboulette at the Opéra-Comique
- 2024 : L'Avare by Molière at the Opéra-Comédie, Montpellier (Compagnie Domaine d'O)

=== Director ===
- 1977 : Blanche Alicata
- 1979 : La Famille Deschiens et Les Oubliettes
- 1980 : Les Précipitations
- 1981 : En avant (with Macha Makeieff)
- 1982 : Les Blouses by Jérôme Deschamps (with Macha Makeieff) Théâtre national de Strasbourg
- 1984 : La Veillée, Festival d'Avignon
- 1987 : Les Petits Pas, Festival d'Avignon
- 1987 : C'est dimanche, Théâtre Nanterre-Amandiers
- 1989 : Lapin chasseur, Théâtre national de Chaillot, Grande halle de la Villette
- 1990 : Les Frères Zénith, Théâtre municipal de Sète, Théâtre national de Chaillot
- 1992 : Les Pieds dans l'eau, Théâtre de Nîmes, Grande halle de la Villette
- 1993 : Les Brigands by Jacques Offenbach, Opéra Bastille
- 1994 : C'est Magnifique, Théâtre de Nîmes, Théâtre du Chatelet
- 1996 : Le Défilé
- 1997 : Les Précieuses ridicules by Molière, (with Macha Makeieff), Théâtre national de Bretagne, Odéon-Théâtre de l'Europe
- 1999 : Les Pensionnaires by Jérôme Deschamps (with Macha Makeieff)
- 2001 : La Cour des grands by Jérôme Deschamps and Macha Makeieff (with Macha Makeieff), Théâtre national de Chaillot
- 2003 : Les Étourdis by Jérôme Deschamps and Macha Makeieff (with Macha Makeieff), Théâtre national de Chaillot
- 2006 : La Méchante Vie by Henri Monnier, (with Macha Makeieff), Théâtre national de Chaillot
- 2007 : L'Affaire de la rue de Lourcine by Eugène Labiche, (with Macha Makeieff), Odéon-Théâtre de l'Europe
- 2007 : L’Étoile by Emmanuel Chabrier, (with Macha Makeieff), Opéra-Comique
- 2008 : Zampa (ou la fiancée de marbre) opéra comique by Ferdinand Herold, (with Macha Makeieff), Opéra-Comique
- 2008 : Salle des fêtes by Jérôme Deschamps and Macha Makeieff, (with Macha Makeieff), Théâtre de Nîmes
- 2008 : Fra Diavolo opéra comique by Daniel-François-Esprit Auber, Opéra-Comique
- 2010 : Un fil à la patte by Georges Feydeau, Comédie-Française
- 2010 : Les Boulingrin opéra bouffe by Georges Aperghis, Opéra-Comique
- 2011 : Courteline en dentelles by Courteline, Théâtre des Bouffes du Nord
- 2011 : Les Brigands by Jacques Offenbach, (with Macha Makeieff), Opéra-Comique
- 2013 : Mârouf, savetier du Caire by Henri Rabaud, Opéra-Comique

== Filmography ==
=== Actor ===
- 1978 : Sam et Sally by Nicolas Ribowski, (TV) episode : 'Lily'
- 1993 : Les Pieds sous la table
- 1993 : Maigret : (TV) 7 : Maigret et les Caves du Majestic
- 1994 : La Séparation
- 1996 : Ligne de vie
- 1998 : Je suis vivante et je vous aime
- 2003 : Les filles, personne s'en méfie

=== Director ===
- 1985 : Tam-tam by Jérôme Deschamps, Macha Makeïeff and Guy Girard
- 1987 : C'est dimanche by Jérôme Deschamps and Macha Makeïeff
- 1993 : Les Brigands with Don Kent
- 1993 : C’est magnifique with Don Kent
- 1993 : Les Frères Zénith with Don Kent
- 1989 : Lapin chasseur with Don Kent
- 2009 : La Véritable Histoire du chat botté

== Recognition ==
- 1981 : Prix de la révélation théâtrale de l'année du Syndicat de la critique for La Petite Chemise de nuit.
- 1988 : Molière du meilleur spectacle musical for Les Petits Pas.
- 1990 : Molière du meilleur spectacle comique for Lapin chasseur.
- 1992 : Académie française prize for 'jeune théâtre'.
- 1992 : Grand prix national du théâtre.
- 1993 : Molière du meilleur spectacle comique pour Les Pieds dans l'eau.
- 1996 : Molière du meilleur spectacle comique pour C'est magnifique.
- 2011 : Molière du théâtre public for Un fil à la patte

== Notes and references ==
=== Bibliography ===
- Fabienne Pascaud, Claire David, Deschamps Makeieff le sens de la tribu..., Arles : Actes Sud, 2010.
- Bernard Morlino, Jean-Paul Donadi, Le Reste du monde : Ets Deschamps, Makeieff & Tati, Séguier/ Archimbaud, 2003.
- Macha Makeieff, Frédéric Mitterrand, Deschamps Deschiens : le théâtre de Jérôme Deschamps, Librairie Séguier Archimbaud, 1989.
- Jérôme Deschamps, Macha Makeieff, Frédéric Pugnière-Saavedra, Le Phénomène "Deschiens" à la télévision : de la genèse d'un programme sériel à la manifestation de l'humour, l'Harmattan, 2000.

=== External links ===
- Jérôme Deschamps at IMDb
- Officiel site of Deschiens et Compagnie

This page is in part a translation from French Wikipedia
