= Arthur Joffé =

French film director (born 1953)

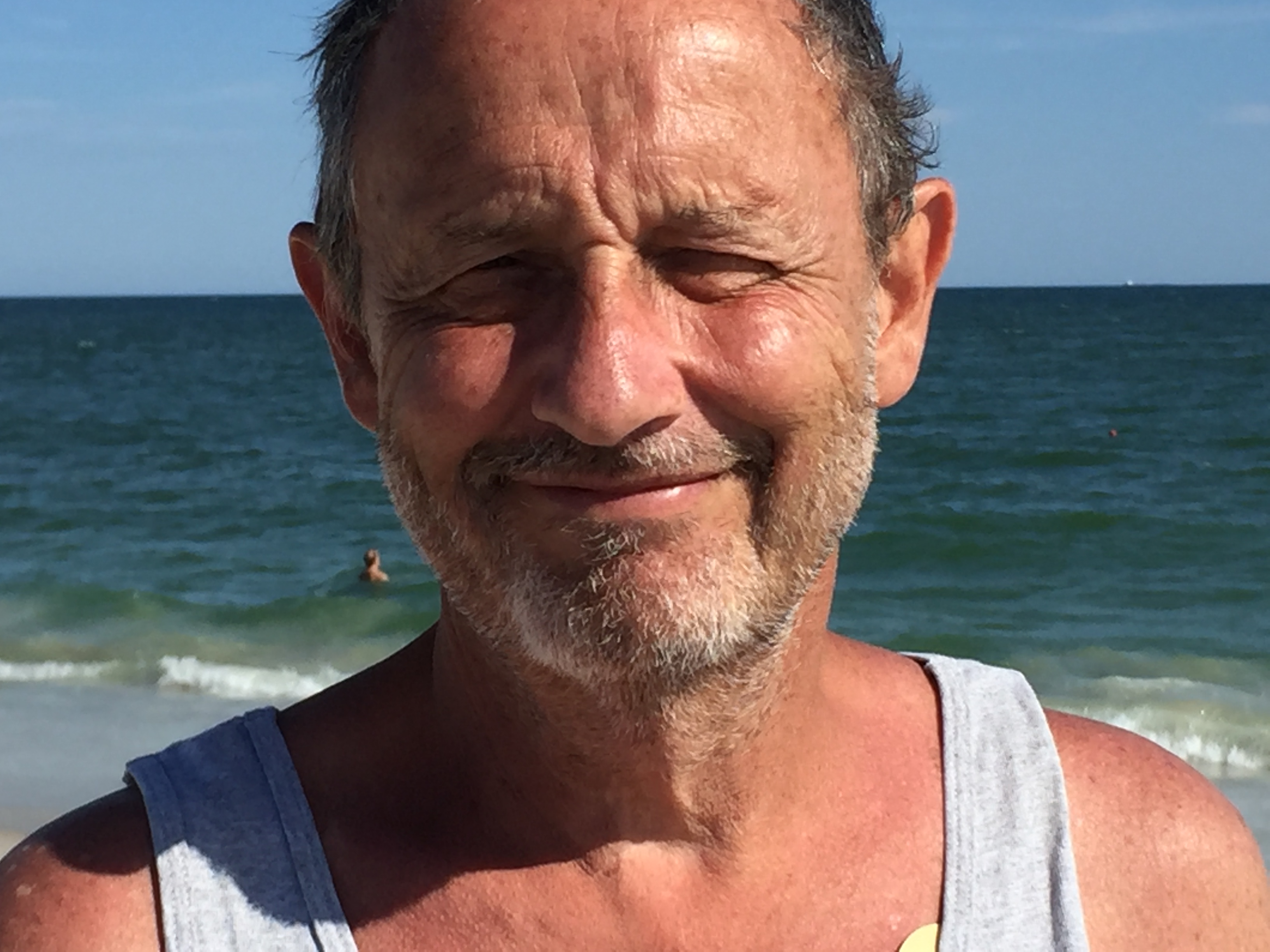

Arthur Joffé (born 20 September 1953) is a French film director, the son of the director and screenwriter Alex Joffé. He was awarded the Palme d'Or du court métrage at the 1982 Cannes Film Festival for his short film Merlin ou le cours de l'or. He was also the recipient of the Youth Prize in Cannes for his film Casting.

Arthur Joffé was born in 1953 in Paris. His first full-length feature film was Harem, starring Ben Kingsley and Nastassja Kinski.

== Filmography ==
- 1980 : La Découverte (short feature)
- 1982 : Merlin ou le cours de l'or (short feature)
- 1982 : Casting
- 1985 : Harem
- 1990 : Alberto Express
- 1998 : Let There Be Light
- 2004 : Ne quittez pas !
- 2015 : Le Feu sacré (documentary)
