= Sophie Mounicot =

French actress and writer (born 1960)

- Born: 6 August 1960 (age 66); Paris, France
- Occupations: Actress, Writer
- Years active: 1988–present

Sophie Mounicot (French: [sɔfi muniko]; born in Paris on August 6, 1960) is a French actress and writer.

She became a household name thanks to the television series Voisin, voisine a French drama series comprising 385 episodes of 58 minutes each, broadcast on La Cinq from 19 September 1988 to 12 April 1992. She is also well known for the comedy series H.

== Theater ==
Year	Title	Author	Director	Notes
2004	Quand l'amour s'emmêle	Anne-Marie Etienne	Anne-Marie Etienne	Théâtre du Palais-Royal
2005–2008	Toc toc	Laurent Baffie	Laurent Baffie	Théâtre du Palais-Royal
2008	C'est mon tour	François Rollin, Gérald Sibleyras & Sophie Mounicot	Roland Marchisio	Petits Mathurins
2011	Consensuelle !	Gérald Sibleyras	Isabelle Malin	Théâtre du Petit Gymnase
2014	Un jour c'était la nuit	Emmanuel Robert-Espalieu	Catherine Marchal	Festival d'Avignon
2017	Folle Amanda	Pierre Barillet & Jean-Pierre Gredy	Marie-Pascale Osterrieth	Théâtre Antoine-Simone Berriau
2018–2019	La Dame de chez Maxim	Georges Feydeau	Alain Sachs	Théâtre du Gymnase Marie Bell

== Filmography ==
Year	Title	Role	Director	Notes
1989	Deux	Anne	Claude Zidi	
1989	A Fine Romance	Nurse	Thomas J. Wright	TV series (1 episode)
1990	Tribunal	Béatrice Roux	Gérard Espinasse	TV series (1 episode)
1991	La pagaille	Thérèse	Pascal Thomas	
1991	Cas de divorce	Laure Picard	Gérard Espinasse	TV series (1 episode)
1992	Tous les garçons		Etienne Faure	Short
1992	Premiers baisers	Stéphanie	Jacques Samyn	TV series (1 episode)
1993	Rêve d'amour	The woman	Nick Quinn	Short
1993	Regarde-moi quand je te quitte	Rebecca	Philippe de Broca	TV movie
1994	La Cité de la peur	Journalist	Alain Berbérian	
1994	3000 scénarios contre un virus	Catherine	Jean-Daniel Pillault	TV series (1 episode)
1994	Les filles d'à côté	Madame Vilmarinet	Jacques Samyn & Gérard Espinasse	TV series (9 episodes)
1995	Les apprentis	Photoshop supervisor	Pierre Salvadori	
1996	The Liars		Élie Chouraqui	
1996	Les frères Gravet	Jacques's wife	René Féret	TV movie
1996	Docteur Sylvestre	Laurence	Dominique Tabuteau	TV series (2 episodes)
1997	Tiré à part	Fabienne	Bernard Rapp	
1997	Direct	Journalist	Myriam Donasis	Short
1997	Julie Lescaut	Anne Dworski	Alain Wermus	TV series (1 episode)
1998	Les jeux sont faits!	Christiane	Bernard Rosselli	Short
1998	Avocats & associés	Fabienne Cordelier	Philippe Triboit	TV series (1 episode)
1998–2002	H	Clara Saulnier	Édouard Molinaro, Éric Lartigau, ...	TV series (71 episodes)
1999	The Dilettante	Gym teacher	Pascal Thomas	
1999	Du bleu jusqu'en Amérique	Occupational therapist	Sarah Lévy	
1999	À vot' service		Claude Berne	
1999	Les petits souliers	The mother	Éric Toledano and Olivier Nakache	Short
1999	La traversée du phare	Madame Gaubert	Thierry Redler	TV movie
2000	In extremis	Laurence	Etienne Faure	
2000	Sur un air d'autoroute	Sophie Merlan	Thierry Boscheron	
2000	Trait d'union	Madame Théo	Bruno Garcia	Short
2000	Drug Scenes	The mother	Jean-Louis Tribes	TV series (1 episode)
2000	Sauvetage	Sophie	Jacques Malaterre	TV series (1 episode)
2000	Police district	Pascale	Olivier Chavarot	TV series (1 episode)
2001	Vertiges de l'amour	The Hypocrite	Laurent Chouchan	
2001	L'impasse du cachalot	Mademoiselle Audoin	Élisabeth Rappeneau	TV movie
2001–2005	Les enquêtes d'Éloïse Rome	Mikaëla Schwabb	Christophe Douchand, Denys Granier-Deferre, ...	TV series (24 episodes)
2002	If I Were a Rich Man	Madame Gabai	Gérard Bitton & Michel Munz	
2002	Monique	Gabrielle	Valérie Guignabodet	
2002	Jojo la frite	Journalist	Nicolas Cuche	
2002	Saturday night frayeur	The friend	Nathalie Serrault	Short
2002	Bois ta Suze		Emmanuel Silvestre & Thibault Staib	Short
2002	Les paradis de Laura	The mother	Olivier Panchot	TV movie
2002	On ne choisit pas sa famille	Sylviane	François Luciani	TV movie
2003	Je hais les enfants	Cathy	Lorenzo Gabriele	TV movie
2004	Clara et moi	Géraldine	Arnaud Viard	
2004	Les robinsonnes	Cathy	Laurent Dussaux	TV movie
2004	Un petit garçon silencieux	Doctor Edelmann	Sarah Lévy	TV movie
2004	Jeff et Léo, flics et jumeaux	The therapist	Olivier Guignard	TV series (1 episode)
2005	Ze film	The mother	Guy Jacques	
2005	L'arbre et l'oiseau	Martine	Marc Rivière	TV movie
2006	Inconnue de la départementale	Tania	Didier Bivel	TV movie
2006	Le serment de Mado	Nathalie	François Luciani	TV movie
2006	Mes parents chéris	Fabienne	Philomène Esposito	TV movie
2006	Au crépuscule des temps	Marie-Claude	Sarah Lévy	TV movie
2007	Confidences	Marie	Laurent Dussaux	TV mini-series
2008	Un château en Espagne	Stage manager	Isabelle Doval	
2008	Ça se soigne ?	Anna	Laurent Chouchan	
2008	Un vrai papa Noël	Brigitte	José Pinheiro	TV movie
2008	Le monde est petit	Hélène	Régis Musset	TV movie
2008	Comprend rien aux femmes		Michaëla Watteaux	TV movie
2008	Que du bonheur	Nicole	Pascal Bourdiaux	TV series (1 episode)
2009	Victor	Lydia	Thomas Gilou	
2009	Frères de sang	Morvan	Stéphane Kappes	TV movie
2009	Pas de toit sans moi	Irène Bouchardeau	Guy Jacques	TV movie
2009	Les Amants de l'ombre	Gilberte	Philippe Niang	TV movie
2010	La robe du soir	Juliette's mother	Myriam Aziza	
2010	Tombé sur la tête	Patricia	Didier Albert	TV movie
2010	Fais pas ci, fais pas ça	Madame Didier	Laurent Dussaux	TV series (1 episode)
2010	Joséphine, ange gardien	Social worker	Pascal Heylbroeck	TV series (1 episode)
2011	Hollywoo	Marie	Frédéric Berthe & Pascal Serieis	
2011	Midi et soir	Virginie	Laurent Firode	TV movie
2011	La grève des femmes	Hélène	Stéphane Kappes	TV movie
2011	Ripoux anonymes	Myriam	Claude Zidi	TV series (1 episode)
2011	Camping paradis	Louise	François Guérin	TV series (1 episode)
2012	Par amour	Florence	Laurent Firode	
2012	Frère & soeur	Valérie Loisel	Denis Malleval	TV movie
2012	Le bonheur des Dupré	Gladys	Bruno Chiche	TV movie
2012	Le sang de la vigne	Emilia	Marc Rivière	TV series (1 episode)
2013	Boulevard du Palais	Valérie	Christian Bonnet	TV series (2 episodes)
2013–2015	Dans la tête des gens	Sophie / Mother	Guilhem Connac	TV series (2 episodes)
2015	Merci pour tout, Charles	Babeth	Ernesto Oña	TV movie
2015	Le secret d'Elise	Suzanne Letilleul	Alexandre Laurent	TV mini-series
2015	Falco	Marilise	Jean-Christophe Delpias	TV series (1 episode)
2015	Presque parfaites	Béatrice	Gabriel Julien-Laferrière	TV series (1 episode)
2016	Camping 3	Sabrina	Fabien Onteniente	
2016	Murders at Strasbourg	France Benoît	Laurence Katrian	TV movie
2018	To Each, Her Own	Sylvie Lopez	Myriam Aziza	
2018	Les Municipaux, ces héros	Ghislaine	Les Chevaliers du fiel	
2018	Deutsch-les-Landes	Ghyslaine	Denis Dercourt, Annette Ernst, ...	TV series (10 episodes)
2019	À cause des filles ..?	The editor colleague	Pascal Thomas	
2020	Groom (Season 2)	William Mazières' evil mother	Théodore Bonnet	Webseries (10 episodes)
2025	It Takes Two to Tango	Catherine, Baptiste's mother	Jean-Pierre Améris	
