= Franck Dubosc =

French actor and comedian

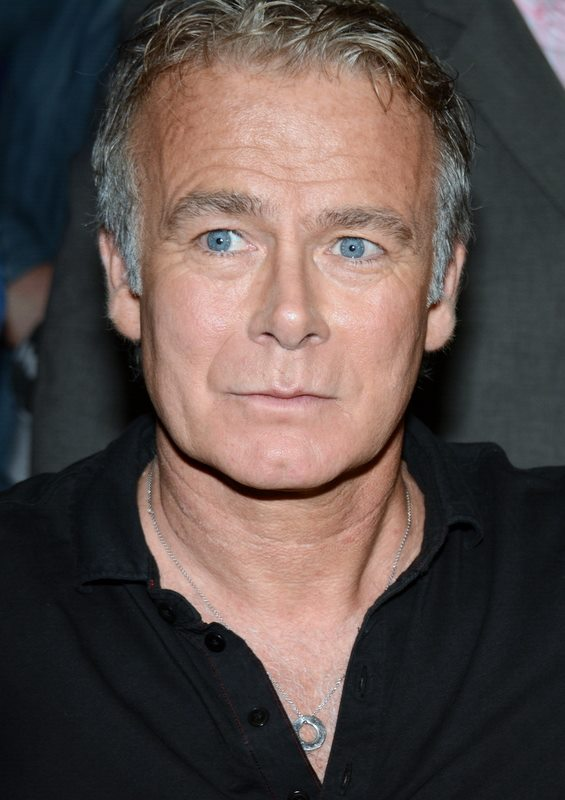
- Franck Dubosc in 2014
- Born: 7 November 1963 (age 62); Le Petit-Quevilly, Seine-Maritime, Normandy, France
- Occupations: Actor; Comedian
- Years active: 1985–present

Franck Dubosc (French pronunciation: [fʁɑ̃k dybɔsk]; born 7 November 1963) is a French actor and stand-up comedian.

Dubosc occupies 94th place in the list of the most profitable actors of French cinema.

== Filmography ==
- Rumba Therapy (Rumba la vie) (2022) - Screenwriter, director, actor

Year	Title	Role	Director	Notes
1985	À nous les garçons	Cyril	Michel Lang	
1986	Justice de flic	Hervé	Michel Gérard	
1986	Les gémeaux	Philippe	Philippe Sisbane	Short
1986	Félicien Grevèche	Louis-Anatole de Sèze	Michel Wyn	TV mini-series
1987	Coronation Street	Patric Podevin	Ron Francis	TV series (7 episodes)
1990	Des yeux couleur du temps	Francis	Philippe Sisbane	Short
1991	De l'autre côté du parc		Philippe Sisbane	Short
1991	Bergerac	Gerard Cossec	Tony Dow	TV series (1 episode)
1993	Les yeux de Cécile		Jean-Pierre Denis	TV movie
1993	La tête en l'air	Olivier	Marlène Bertin	TV series (1 episode)
1994	Honorin et l'enfant prodigue	Frédéric	Jean Chapot	TV movie
1994	Highlander: The Series	Michel de Bourgogne	Peter Ellis	TV series (1 episode)
1995	Les Cinq Dernières Minutes	Cop	Jean-Louis Lorenzi	TV series (1 episode)
1997	Sans cérémonie	Adrien Chailly	Michel Lang	TV movie
1997	Le serre aux truffes	Paul	Jacques Audoir	TV movie
1998	Le clone	Bernard	Fabio Conversi	
1998	Charité biz'ness	TV Host	Thierry Barthes & Pierre Jamin	
1999	Les parasites	Franck	Philippe de Chauveron	
1999	Trafic d'influence	Fabien	Dominique Farrugia	
1999	Recto/Verso	Jérémy	Jean-Marc Longval	
1999	L'homme de ma vie	Shy Man	Stéphane Kurc	
1999	Des amis de 20 ans		Franck Tapiro	Short
2000	Elie annonce Semoun	Various Characters	Élie Semoun	TV movie
2000	Nos jolies colonies de vacances	Philippe	Stéphane Kurc	TV movie
2003	Elie annonce Semoun, la suite...	Various Characters	Élie Semoun	TV movie
2004	Au secours, j'ai 30 ans!	Léo Melvil	Marie-Anne Chazel	
2005	Iznogoud	The chamberlain	Patrick Braoudé	
2005	La famille Zappon	Oliver Duchenne	Amar Arhab & Fabrice Michelin	TV movie
2005	L'homme qui voulait passer à la télé		Amar Arhab & Fabrice Michelin	TV movie
2006	Camping	Patrick Chirac	Fabien Onteniente	NRJ Ciné Awards - Best Counterpart
2007	Elie annonce Semoun, la suite de la suite	Various Characters	Élie Semoun	TV movie
2008	Disco	Didier Travolta	Fabien Onteniente	
2008	Asterix at the Olympic Games	Cacofonix	Frédéric Forestier & Thomas Langmann	
2009	Incognito	Francis	Éric Lavaine	
2009	Cinéman	Régis Deloux	Yann Moix	
2010	Camping 2	Patrick Chirac	Fabien Onteniente	
2011	Le marquis	Thomas Gardesse	Dominique Farrugia	
2011	Bienvenue à bord	Rémy Pasquier	Éric Lavaine	
2012	Les seigneurs	David Léandri	Olivier Dahan	
2012	10 jours en or	Marc Bajau	Nicolas Brossette	
2012	Plan de table	Pierre	Christelle Raynal	
2012	A Turtle's Tale 2: Sammy's Escape from Paradise	Sammy	Vincent Kesteloot & Ben Stassen	French voice
2013	Boule & Bill	Papa Boule	Alexandre Charlot & Franck Magnier	
2014	Barbecue	Baptiste	Éric Lavaine	
2014	Fiston	Antoine Chamoine	Pascal Bourdiaux	
2014	SMS	Vincent	Gabriel Julien-Laferrière	
2015	Bis	Eric Drigeard	Dominique Farrugia	
2015	French Cuisine	François	Florent Siri	
2015	Peplum	Zéphyros	Philippe Lefebvre	TV series (1 episode)
2016	Les Visiteurs: La Révolution	Gonzague de Montmirail	Jean-Marie Poiré	
2016	Camping 3	Patrick Chirac	Fabien Onteniente	
2016	Les têtes de l'emploi	Stéphane Martel	Alexandre Charlot & Franck Magnier	
2016	Finding Dory	Marlin	Andrew Stanton	French voice
2016	Les Beaux Malaises	Himself	Éric Lavaine	TV mini-series
2017	L'embarras du choix	The pastor	Éric Lavaine	
2017	Boule & Bill 2	Papa Boule	Pascal Bourdiaux	
2018	Rolling to You	Jocelyn	Franck Dubosc	
2019	All Inclusive	Jean-Paul Cisse	Fabien Onteniente	
2020	Call My Agent! - Season 4 Episode 2	Himself	Antoine Garceau	TV-Series
2022	Miraculous Ladybug	Harry Clown	Thomas Astruc	TV series (1 episode)
2024	Chien et Chat	Jack	Reem Kherici	English Title: Cat & Dog (2024 film)
2024	Family Pack	Jérôme Vassier	François Uzan	French Title: Loups-garous
2024	Prodigies	Serge Vallois	Frédéric Potier Valentin Potier	French Title: Prodigieuses
2025	How to Make a Killing	Michael	Franck Dubosc	French Title: Un ours dans le Jura
