= Mathilde Seigner =

French actress

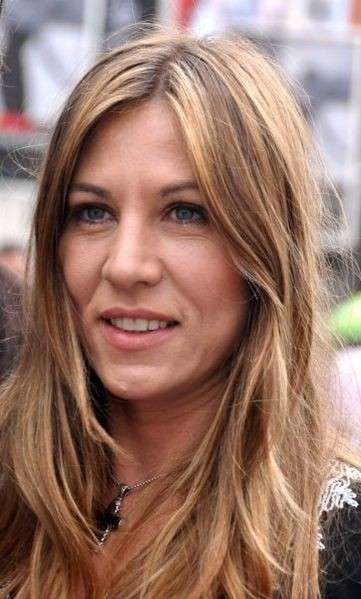
- Seigner in 2009
- Born: Paris, France
- Occupation: Actress
- Years active: 1994–present
- Relatives: Louis Seigner (grandfather); Françoise Seigner (aunt); Emmanuelle Seigner (sister)

Mathilde Seigner is a French actress.

== Early life and education ==
Mathilde Seigner was born in Paris, France. She is the granddaughter of actor Louis Seigner (1903–1991). She is the sister of Emmanuelle Seigner and a niece of Françoise Seigner.

Seigner studied comedy at the French theatre school Cours Florent drama school in Paris.

== Career ==
Seigner first appeared on screen alongside her sister Emmanuelle in Le Sourire (The Smile) directed by Claude Miller.

Seigner's acting performances have been confined to French-language films, but she has appeared in a number of productions. She won Best Actress at the Montreal World Film Festival in 2001 for her role in Betty Fisher et autres histoires (Alias Betty), and has been nominated for a César Award three times.

She received the Prix Michel Simon in 1995 for her role in Rosine. Two years later, she won a César Award for Best Supporting Actress for her role in Nettoyage à sec.

Seigner won the Romy Schneider Prize in 1999. Her other films include Une hirondelle a fait le printemps (2001) as a city dweller who discovers the joys of the countryside; Le passager de l'été, Zone libre, and Danse avec lui (2007). With 3 amis, she returned to comedy, in such films as Tout pour plaire and Détrompez-vous.

She returned in 2009 with three dramatic comedies about family (Quelque chose à te dire, Trésor and Une semaine sur deux (et la moitié des vacances scolaires)). After Fini les vacances (2010), she appeared in Camping 2 and the remake of La guerre des boutons (2011).

In 2012, Seigner appeared in Dans la tourmente and Max. Two years after L'amour, la mort les fringues, she appeared in Nina, a comedy in which she is the heroine alongside François Berléand and François Vincentelli, as her husband and lover, respectively.

== Other activities ==
In 2009, Seigner signed a petition in support of her brother-in-law Roman Polanski, calling for his release after Polanski was arrested in Switzerland in relation to his 1977 charge for drugging and raping a 13-year-old girl.

On 24 February 2012, during the César Award ceremony, she interrupted the telecast when Michel Blanc won, stating she would have preferred that Joey Starr won.

== Theatre ==
Year	Title	Author	Director	Notes
1988	The Moods of Marianne	Alfred de Musset	Françoise Seigner	
1988	Les Chevaliers de la Table ronde	Jean Cocteau	Françoise Seigner (2)	
1989	Les Fourberies de Scapin	Molière	Françoise Seigner (3)	
1990	Le Médecin malgré lui	Molière	Michel Galabru	
1990	The Miser	Molière	Françoise Seigner (4)	
1991	L'Étourdi	Molière	Françoise Seigner (5)	Théâtre des Célestins
1992	Et s'il n'en restait qu'un	Françoise Dorin	Françoise Seigner (6)	
1997	Uncle Vanya	Anton Chekhov	Patrice Kerbrat	Théâtre Hébertot
2001-03	Educating Rita	Willy Russell	Michel Fagadau	Théâtre des Champs-Élysées
2011	Love, Loss, and What I Wore	Nora & Delia Ephron	Danièle Thompson	Théâtre Marigny
2013–15	Nina	André Roussin	Bernard Murat	Théâtre Édouard VII

== Filmography ==
Year	Title	Role	Director	Notes
1989	Salut les musclés		Jacques Samyn	TV series (1 episode)
1991	Cas de divorce	Pascale Seguin	Gérard Espinasse	TV series (1 episode)
1994	Rosine	Marie	Christine Carrière	Acteurs à l'Écran – Best Actress
1994	Le sourire	Tututt	Claude Miller	
1994	Boulevard Mac Donald		Melvil Poupaud	Short
1994	3000 scénarios contre un virus		Daniel Vigne	TV series (1 episode)
1995	J'aime beaucoup ce que vous faites	Laurence	Xavier Giannoli	Short
1996	Mémoires d'un jeune con	Nathalie	Patrick Aurignac	
1996	Portraits chinois	Fanny	Martine Dugowson	
1996	Vacances bougeoises	Mélanie	Jean-Claude Brialy	TV movie
1996	Pêcheur d'Islande	Gaud	Daniel Vigne (2)	TV movie
1996	Combats de femme	Nadine	Pascale Bailly	TV series (1 episode)
1997	Dry Cleaning	Marylin	Anne Fontaine	Nominated – César Award for Best Supporting Actress
1997	Vive la république	Corinne	Éric Rochant	
1997	Francorusse	Sophie	Alexis Miansarow	
1997	The Man I Love	Lise	Stéphane Giusti	TV movie
1997	Si je t'oublie Sarajevo	Leila	Arnaud Sélignac	TV movie
1997	Georges Dandin	Angélique	Jean-Claude Brialy (2)	TV movie
1998	Noël en famille		Fabienne Berthaud & Aruna Villiers	Short
1998	Marc Eliot	Isabelle Germain	Josée Dayan	TV series (1 episode)
1998	Commandant Nerval	Nathalie Joste	Arnaud Sélignac (2)	TV series (1 episode)
1999	Venus Beauty Institute	Samantha	Tonie Marshall	Nominated – César Award for Best Supporting Actress
1999	Time Regained	Céleste	Raúl Ruiz	
1999	Belle maman	Séverine	Gabriel Aghion	
1999	Le bleu des villes	Mylène	Stéphane Brizé	
2000	Harry, He's Here to Help	Claire	Dominik Moll	Nominated – César Award for Best Supporting Actress
2000	Le coeur à l'ouvrage	Chloë	Laurent Dussaux	
2000	Le mal des femmes		Daniel Vigne (3)	
2000	La chambre des magiciennes	Odette	Claude Miller (2)	TV movie
2001	The Girl from Paris	Sandrine Dumez	Christian Carion	Cabourg Film Festival – Best Actress
2001	Inch'Allah Dimanche	Nicole Briat	Yamina Benguigui	
2001	The Milk of Human Kindness	Josiane	Dominique Cabrera	Locarno International Film Festival – Special Mention
2001	Alias Betty	Carole Novacki	Claude Miller (3)	Montreal World Film Festival – Best Actress
2002	Madame Sans-Gêne	Catherine Hübscher	Philippe de Broca	TV movie
2002	Les enquêtes d'Éloïse Rome	Irène	Edwin Baily	TV series (1 episode)
2003	Tristan	Emmanuelle Barsac	Philippe Harel	
2004	Les parisiens	Clémentine / Anne	Claude Lelouch	
2004	Mariages !	Valentine	Valérie Guignabodet	
2005	Le courage d'aimer	Clémentine / Anne	Claude Lelouch (2)	
2005	Palais royal!	Laurence	Valérie Lemercier	
2005	Tout pour plaire	Juliette Fischer	Cécile Telerman	
2006	Camping	Sophie Gatineau	Fabien Onteniente	
2006	Le passager de l'été	Angèle	Florence Moncorgé-Gabin	
2007	Game of Four	Lisa	Bruno Dega	
2007	3 amis	Claire	Michel Boujenah	
2007	Zone libre	Daughter-in-law	Christophe Malavoy	
2007	Danse avec lui	Alexandra	Valérie Guignabodet (2)	
2009	Trésor	Nathalie	Claude Berri & François Dupeyron	
2009	Une semaine sur deux (et la moitié des vacances scolaires)	Marjorie	Ivan Calbérac	
2009	Quelque chose à te dire	Alice Celliers	Cécile Telerman (2)	
2010	Camping 2	Sophie Gatineau	Fabien Onteniente (2)	
2011	La guerre des boutons	Lebrac's mother	Yann Samuell	
2011	Dans la tourmente	Hélène	Christophe Ruggia	
2012	Maman	Sandrine	Alexandra Leclère	
2012	Bowling	Mathilde	Marie-Castille Mention-Schaar	
2012	Max	Rose	Stéphanie Murat	
2012	Médecin-chef à la Santé	Séverine Vincent	Yves Rénier	TV movie
2014	La liste de mes envies	Jocelyne Guerbette	Didier Le Pêcheur	
2015	Come What May	Mado	Christian Carion (2)	
2015	Une mère	Marie	Christine Carrière (2)	
2015	Flic, tout simplement	Martine Monteil	Yves Rénier (2)	TV movie
2016	Back to Mom's	Carole Mazerin	Éric Lavaine	
2016	Sam	Sam	Valérie Guignabodet (3)	TV series (6 episodes) – Replaced by Natacha Lindinger for Season 2.
2016	Chacun sa vie et son intime conviction	Mathilde	Claude Lelouch (3)	
2016	Coexister	Sophie Demanche	Fabrice Eboué	
2018	Edmond	Maria Legault	Alexis Michalik	
