= Seigner =

Seigner is a surname, likely of French origin. Notable people with the surname include:

- Emmanuelle Seigner (born 1966), French former fashion model, singer, and actress
- Françoise Seigner (1928-2008), French actress
- Gaston Seigner (1878-1918), French equestrian
- Louis Seigner (1903-1991), French actor
- Mathilde Seigner (born 1968), French actress
