= Jarry (comedian) =

French comedian and TV host

Jarry (born Anthony Lambert) is a French comedian, actor, director, and TV host. He was born on August 5, 1977, in Angers (Maine-et-Loire).

== Life ==
=== Childhood ===
Lambert, was born prematurely after his mother was involved in a car accident. Both sides of his family had a long history of blue-collar work, with factory workers and wine-makers on his father's side, and smiths on his mother's. He grew up in Rablay-sur-Layon with his three brothers.

Lambert's father was adamant that he practice judo. Not wanting to disappoint him, he would go to dance classes wearing his judo gi. This interest in dance later allowed him to perform, and create his own dance course for his local rec center, before joining a hip-hop dance troupe.

=== Career ===
Professionally, Lambert opted for the mononym "Jarry" at age 17. His mother had previously noted how sad she was that her maiden name of Jarry would disappear with her. He then chose it as a tribute to her.

== Personal life ==
Jarry is openly gay. He came out publicly at 24. He had declared being heterosexual until his coming out. He felt that he had to choose to either bear his homosexuality or be proud of it. Although he has been in a long-term relationship, little is known about his partner. In June 2016 he became a father to twins born via surrogate. He has not shown his children's faces.

=== Accusations of inappropriate conduct and racism ===
On October 17, 2025 Médiapart published a story alleging that fifteen people had seen Jarry use racist and sexually-explicit language, as well as exhibiting inappropriate conduct on the set of the TV series Maison de retraite, filmed earlier that year. Jarry felt that his humor had been misinterpreted.

== Timeline ==
=== Movies ===
- 2008 : De l'autre côté du lit de Pascale Pouzadoux : un client
- 2009 : Bambou de Didier Bourdon : Loïc, le collègue et ami d'Alain
- 2014 : Les Trois Frères : Le Retour de Didier Bourdon, Bernard Campan et Pascal Légitimus : un banquier
- 2018 : Christ(off) de Pierre Dudan : Père Luc
- 2019 : Nicky Larson et le Parfum de Cupidon de Philippe Lacheau : M. Mokkori
- 2020 : Divorce Club de Michaël Youn : Fred Eric
- 2021 : Maison de retraite de Thomas Gilou : Alban
- 2024 : Maison de retraite 2 de Claude Zidi Jr. : Alban
- 2025 : Le Jour J de Claude Zidi Jr. : Hans
- 2012-2013 : Comme ça, c'est mieux !, avec Charlotte Gabris
- 2012-2017 : Ariane fait sa mytho !, avec Ariane Brodier
- 2013-2015 : Jeff Panacloc perd le contrôle, avec Jeff Panacloc
- 2013 : Nouveau spectacle, avec Élisabeth Buffet
- 2018 : Le monde des grands, avec BenH
- Légères et sans filtre
- Casino
- Damien Lecamp

== On TV ==
- 2016 : Concours Eurovision de la chanson 2016 : semi-final commentary with Marianne James
- 2017 : Concours Eurovision de la chanson 2017 : semi-final commentary with Marianne James
- 2017-2018 : Le Grand Bêtisier du 31 (TF1) : with Karine Ferri
- 2018 : Le Grand Bêtisier de l'été (TF1) with Karine Ferri
- 2018 : 3615 Arthur & Jarry (TF1) with Arthur
- 2019 : Vendredi tout est Jarry (TF1)
- 2020-2022 : Good Singers (TF1)
- 2020-2021 : Jarry Show (Plug RTL)
- 2021 : Game of Talents (TF1)
- 2022-2024 : Le Big Show (France 2)
- 2022 et 2023 : Édition spéciale 14 Juillet (France 2)
- 2023-2024 : Tout le monde veut prendre sa place (France 2)
- 2026 onwards : The Imposter sur TF1

== On stage ==
=== Stand-up comedy ===
- 2007-2009 : Entre fous émois
- 2013-2018 : Atypique
- 2019-2022 : Titre
- 2023 - onwards: Bonhomme

=== Directing ===
- 2012-2013 : Comme ça, c'est mieux !, avec Charlotte Gabris
- 2012-2017 : Ariane fait sa mytho !, avec Ariane Brodier
- 2013-2015 : Jeff Panacloc perd le contrôle, avec Jeff Panacloc
- 2013 : Nouveau spectacle, avec Élisabeth Buffet
- 2018 : Le monde des grands, avec BenH
- Légères et sans filtre
- Casino
- Damien Lecamp
