= Camping (2006 film) =

- Theatrical release poster
- Directed by: Fabien Onteniente
- Written by: Emanuel Booz; Franck Dubosc; Philippe Guillard; Fabien Onteniente
- Produced by: Patrick Godeau; Françoise Galfré
- Starring: Franck Dubosc; Gérard Lanvin; Mathilde Seigner; Antoine Duléry; Claude Brasseur; Mylène Demongeot
- Cinematography: Jérôme Robert
- Edited by: Vincent Tabaillon; Nicole Saunier
- Music by: Frédéric Botton
- Production company: Alicéléo
- Distributed by: Pathé Distribution
- Release date: 26 April 2006
- Running time: 95 minutes
- Country: France
- Language: French
- Budget: $15.9 million
- Box office: $36 million

Camping is a 2006 French comedy film directed by Fabien Onteniente. Two sequels have been made, Camping 2 in 2010 and Camping 3 in 2016. It is the first installment in the Camping film series.

== Plot ==
In August each year, many families go camping at Blue Waves, in Arcachon, on the Atlantic coast. Barbecues, thongs, pastis, and volleyball encounters with naturists are of course all part of the campers' baggage. Escapist desires to Shogun (the local nightclub) are pressing. This year, the reunion could have been nice if not for this year's accumulation of unforeseen events.

== Cast ==
- Franck Dubosc as Patrick Chirac
- Gérard Lanvin as Michel Saint-Josse
- Mathilde Seigner as Sophie Gatineau
- Antoine Duléry as Paul Gatineau
- Claude Brasseur as Jacky Pic
- Mylène Demongeot as Laurette Pic
- Christine Citti as Madame Chatel
- Frédérique Bel as Christy Bergougnoux
- François Levantal as Boyer
- Armonie Sanders as Vanessa Saint-Josse
- Laurent Olmedo as The 37
- Abbes Zahmani as Mendez
- Edéa Darcque as Sidy Mendez
- Chaka Ressiga as Ari Mendez
- Noémie Elbaz as Jessica
- Michael Hofland as Cornelius
- Ida Techer as Cornelia
- Charlie Barde as Aurélie Gatineau
- Eliott Parillaud as Sébastien Gatineau
- Béatrice Costantini as Madame de Brantes
- Dominique Orsolle as Madame Ballot
- Geneviève Geulin as Madame Bigoudis
- Emmanuelle Galabru as Séverine
- Maxime Labet as Manu
- Ari Vatanen as himself

== Reception ==
=== Accolades ===
Year	Award	Category	Recipient	Result
2006	Hamburg Film Festival	Audience Award	Fabien Onteniente	Nominated
2006	NRJ Ciné Award	Best Comedy Film	Fabien Onteniente	Won
2006	NRJ Ciné Award	Best Counterpart	Franck Dubosc	Won

== Sequel ==
A sequel titled Camping 2 was released in 2010.
