= Nina (TV series) =

- Created by: Thalia Rebinsky; Alain Robillard
- Starring: Annelise Hesme; Thomas Jouannet; Nina Melo; Grégoire Bonnet; Alix Bénézech
- Country of origin: France
- Original language: French
- No. of seasons: 6
- No. of episodes: 56

Production
- Running time: 52 minutes

Original release
- Network: France 2 (France); La Une (Belgium); RTP2 (Portugal); Mais na Tela (Brasil)
- Release: June 17, 2015 – May 26, 2021

Nina is a French television series. It was initially broadcast from 2015 to 2021 on France 2.

== Plot ==
At age 39, Nina begins a nursing career in the Madeleine Brès Hospital's internal medicine department, headed by her ex-husband Dr. Costa Antonakis. While taking care of her daughter Lily, who is suffering from cancer, she chooses to be a nurse, surreptitiously reviving Costa's war with his rival, Dr. Proust, and disturbing Costa's relationship with a young pediatrician.

== Cast ==
=== Main cast ===
- Annelise Hesme : Nina Auber (Season 1–6 : 56 episodes)
- Thomas Jouannet : Dr. Costa Antonakis (Season 1–4 : 30 episodes)
- Nina Melo : Léo Bonheur (Season 1–4)
- Grégoire Bonnet : Dr. Samuel Proust (Season 1–3 : 28 episodes)
- Alix Bénézech : Dorothée Ariès (Season 1–4)
- Léa Lopez (Season 1–2) and Ilona Bachelier (Season 3) : Lily Antonakis (28 episodes)
- Stéphane Fourreau : Pascal N'Guyen (Season 1–3 : 24 episodes)
- Farid Elouardi : Dr. Djalil Bensaïd (Season 1–3 : 22 episodes)
- Clément Moreau : Kevin Heurtaud (Season 1–3 : 22 episodes)
- Marie-Christine Adam : Gloria Auber (Season 1–3 : 21 episodes)

=== Supporting cast ===
- Ambroise Michel : Fred (Season 1–3 : 17 episodes)
- Marie Vincent : Nadine Leroy (Season 1–2 : 15 episodes)
- Véronique Viel : Maud (Season 1–3 : 14 episodes)
- Muriel Combeau : Gabrielle Vidal (Season 2–3 : 14 episodes)
- Roman Magloire : Néo (Season 2–3 : 14 episodes)
- Jean-François Garreaud : Antoine Auber (Season 1–3 : 13 episodes)
- Sophie-Charlotte Husson : Dr. Caroline Bergman (Season 3 : 10 episodes)
- Cédric Ben Abdallah : Julien di Maggio (Season 3 : 9 episodes)
- Alexia Barlier : Dr. Hélène Maurier (Season 1 : 8 episodes)
- Alexandre Tacchino : Will (Season 1–2 : 6 episodes)
- Édouard Collin : Nicolas Bourget (Season 2 : 5 episodes)
- Antoine Cholet : Franck Bartel (Season 3 : 4 episodes)
- Charline Paul : Clémence (Season 3 : 4 episodes)

=== Guest ===
- Nicolas Gob : Tomer (Season 1, Episode 3)
- Pascal Elso : Pierre (Season 1, Episode 5)
- Éric Savin : Thierry (Season 1, Episode 6)
- Samir Guesmi : Ali (Season 1, Episode 6)
- Cécilia Cara : Lauren (Season 1, Episode 8)
- Julie de Bona : Juliette (Season 1, Episode 8)
- Frédéric Bouraly : Laurent Rousseau (Season 2, Episode 1)
- Tom Hudson : Jonas (Season 2, Episode 3)
- Alex Descas : Mathias (Season 2, Episode 4)
- Marion Game : Evelyne (Season 2, Episode 5)
- Béatrice Agenin : Guislaine Brunel (Season 2, Episode 6)
- Lucie Jeanne : Julie Brunel (Season 2, Episode 6)
- Armelle Deutsch : Christiana (Season 2, Episode 7)
- Axelle Laffont : Victoire (Season 2, Episode 7)
- Stéphan Guérin-Tillié : Eric Dumas (Season 2, Episode 8)
- Alicia Endemann : Flora (Season 2, Episodes 9 & 10)
- Frédérique Bel : Rita (Season 2, Episode 10)
- Nicole Croisille : Marie-Odile (Season 3, Episode 1)
- Dounia Coesens : Lou Cordelier (Season 3, Episode 3)
- Philippe Lavil : Stéphane Cordelier (Season 3, Episode 3)
- Vanessa Demouy : Elodie Machard (Season 3, Episode 5)
- Doudou Masta : Gérard Bordin (Season 3, Episode 6)
- Stéphane Freiss : Dr. Lacombe (Season 3, Episode 9)
- Linda Hardy : Sabine (Season 3, Episode 10)
- Julien Boisselier : Antoine (Season 4)
- Catherine Jacob : Sylvie (Season 4)
- Marianne James : Valérie (Season 4)
- Christian Vadim : (Season 4)
- Francis Perrin : Gérard (Season 4)
- Cristiana Reali : (Season 4)
- Arthur Jugnot : Nathan (Season 4)
- Bruno Lochet : Marin (Season 5)
- Virginie Lemoine : Marie-Pierre (Season 5)

== Production ==
The directors of the first season were Éric Le Roux and Nicolas Picard. The second season was directed by Le Roux, Hervé Brami and Adeline Darraux. Le Roux, Brami and Emmanuelle Dubergey also directed the third season.

Before the broadcast of the fourth season, a fifth season was already confirmed by the production. Season 5 premiered on November 6, 2019, and had 12 episodes. Season 6 consisted of 6 episodes.

== Ratings ==
Legend

Green: highest
Red: lowest

=== Season 1 (2015) ===
Episodes	Title	Air date	Viewers (millions)	Rating/share Viewers	Viewer rank	Note
1 & 2	La Rentrée	June 17, 2015	3,670,000	16.1%	2	
1 & 2	Pour le meilleur et pour le pire	June 17, 2015	3,420,000	15.6%	2	
3 & 4	Bleus au cœur	June 24, 2015	3,300,000	14.2%	3	
3 & 4	À son image	June 24, 2015	3,250,000	14.4%	3	
5 & 6	Sortie de route	July 1, 2015	3,400,000	15.5%	2	
5 & 6	Qui trop embrasse	July 1, 2015	3,400,000	15.8%	2	
7 & 8	Solitudes	July 8, 2015	3,290,000	13%	2	
7 & 8	La dernière épreuve	July 8, 2015	3,270,000	15.5%	2	

=== Season 2 (2016) ===
Episodes	Title	Air date	Viewers (millions)	Rating/share Viewers	Viewer rank	Note
1 & 2	Le lendemain de la veille	September 28, 2016	3,059,000	13.2%	2	
1 & 2	Deuxième chance	September 28, 2016	3,059,000	14.3%	2	
3 & 4	Mauvaise blague	October 5, 2016	3,320,000	13.6%	2	
3 & 4	Reconstruction	October 5, 2016	3,100,000	14.4%	1	
5 & 6	L'hôpital et ses fantômes	October 12, 2016	3,492,000	14.2%	2	
5 & 6	Sous le choc	October 12, 2016	3,420,000	15.2,%	2	
7 & 8	Maternités	October 19, 2016	3,320,000	13.1%	3	
7 & 8	Papa, où t'es ?	October 19, 2016	3,160,000	13.4%	3	
9 & 10	Sur le ring	October 26, 2016	3,414,000	13.3%	3	
9 & 10	Auf wiedersehen	October 26, 2016	3,550,000	14.6%	3	

=== Season 3 (2017) ===
Episodes	Title	Air date	Viewers (millions)	Rating/share Viewers	Viewer rank	Note
1 & 2	Mauvaises ondes	October 18, 2017	3,557,000	14.5%	2	
1 & 2	Un dernier verre	October 18, 2017	3,380,000	15%	2	
3 & 4	Forts comme la vie	October 25, 2017	3,230,000	13.4%	2	
3 & 4	Une étrange absence	October 25, 2017	3,290,000	14.8%	2	
5 & 6	Love Song	November 1, 2017	3,330,000	13.1%	2	
5 & 6	La vie devant eux	November 1, 2017	3,160,000	13.7%	2	
7 & 8	Retour de flammes	November 8, 2017	3,660,000	14.5%	2	
7 & 8	Résonances	November 8, 2017	3,650,000	16.2%	1	
9 & 10	Celui qui n'a jamais...	November 15, 2017	3,610,000	14.5%	2	
9 & 10	Un vol sans retour	November 15, 2017	3,540,000	16.2%	2	

=== Season 4 (2018) ===
Episodes	Title	Air date	Viewers (millions)	Rating/share Viewers	Viewer rank	Note
1 & 2						
3 & 4						
5 & 6						
7 & 8						
9 & 10						
