= If I Were a Rich Man =

If I Were a Rich Man may refer to:

- If I Were a Rich Man (song), a song from the musical Fiddler on the Roof
- If I Were a Rich Man (film), a 2002 film
- "If I Were a Rich Man", an episode from the series Married... with Children
- "If I Were a Rich Man", an episode from the series Ground Floor
