= Barbecue (film) =

2014 film

- Theatrical release poster
- Directed by: Éric Lavaine
- Written by: Éric Lavaine; Héctor Cabello Reyes
- Produced by: François Cornuau; Vincent Roget; Olivier Courson
- Starring: Lambert Wilson; Franck Dubosc; Florence Foresti; Guillaume de Tonquédec; Lionel Abelanski; Jérôme Commandeur
- Cinematography: François Hernandez
- Edited by: Vincent Zuffranieri
- Production companies: Same Player; Canal+ TF1
- Distributed by: StudioCanal
- Release date: 30 April 2014
- Running time: 98 minutes
- Country: France
- Language: French
- Budget: $11.1 million
- Box office: $14.5 million

Barbecue is a 2014 French ensemble comedy film directed by Éric Lavaine.

== Cast ==
- Lambert Wilson as Antoine Chevalier
- Franck Dubosc as Baptiste
- Florence Foresti as Olivia
- Guillaume de Tonquédec as Yves
- Lionel Abelanski as Laurent
- Jérôme Commandeur as Jean-Mich'
- Sophie Duez as Véronique Chevalier
- Lysiane Meis as Laure
- Valérie Crouzet as Nathalie
- Lucas Lavaine as Guillaume
- Corentin Lavaine as Hugo
- Stéphane De Groodt as Alexandre
- Philippe Laudenbach as Jean Chevalier
- Julie Engelbrecht as The pretty blonde

== Reception ==
Mike McCahill of The Guardian called Barbecue a "boringly white-bread with no cinematic ambition".

While attending Beijing International Film Festival, Clarence Tsui of The Hollywood Reporter had this to say about the film: "[A] half-baked comedy-drama about a group of bourgeois friends who have to confront the pitfalls of middle age".

Representing The New York Times, Nicolas Rapold called the film "[a] kind of utterly unremarkable local product", but added that "its loosely written story doubles as a smirk-inducing glimpse at what feel like very Gallic life challenges".
