= Samuel Le Bihan =

French actor

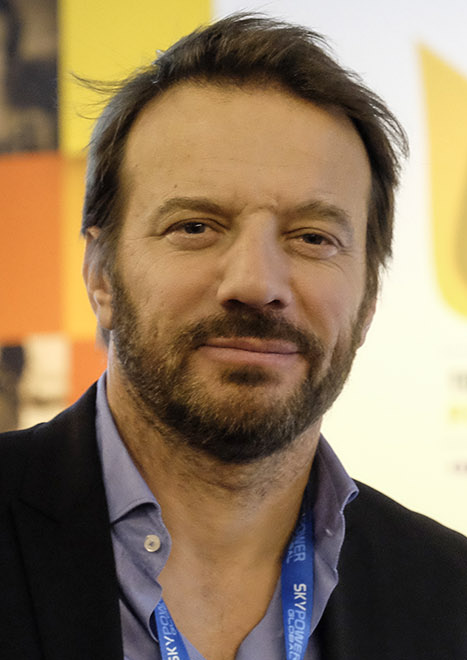
- Samuel Le Bihan in 2015
- Born: 2 November 1965 (age 60); Avranches, France
- Occupation: Actor
- Years active: 1988–present
- Children: 3

Samuel Le Bihan (born 2 November 1965) is a French actor, known for his role in Brotherhood of the Wolf and TV series Alex Hugo. He was awarded a knighthood in the Legion of Honour in 2024 for his work on behalf of children with autism and their families.

== Personal life ==
Le Bihan has three children from different relationships. His daughter Angia's mother is Daniela Beye. His son Jules' mother is Patricia Franchino. His daughter Emma-Rose was born in 2018 during his relationship with DJ Angie Vu Ha.

The actor was inspired by his daughter Angia, who is autistic, to start the Autisme Info Service website, which gives information and advice to families with autistic children. He is the site's co-president.

== Selected filmography ==
=== Film ===
- 1993: Promenades d'été, directed by René Féret
- 1993: La place d'un autre, directed by René Féret
- 1993: Trois Couleurs: Rouge (Three Colours: Red), directed by Krzysztof Kieślowski
- 1994: Une femme française, directed by Régis Wargnier
- 1996: Capitaine Conan, directed by Bertrand Tavernier
- 1997: Le Cousin, directed by Alain Corneau
- 1997: À vendre, directed by Laetitia Masson
- 1997: Restons groupés, directed by Jean-Paul Salomé
- 1998: Les années volées, directed by Fernando Colomo
- 1998: Vénus beauté (institut) (Venus Beauty Institute), directed by Tonie Marshall
- 1999: Peau neuve, directed by Émilie Deleuze
- 1999: TotalWestern, directed by Éric Rochant
- 2000: Jet Set, directed by Fabien Onteniente
- 2001: Le Pacte des loups (Brotherhood of the Wolf), directed by Christophe Gans
- 2001: À la folie... pas du tout (He Loves Me... He Loves Me Not), directed by Laetitia Colombani
- 2001: 3 Zéros, directed by Fabien Onteniente
- 2001: The Code, directed by Manuel Boursinhac
- 2002: A Private Affair, directed by Guillaume Nicloux
- 2002: Fureur, directed by Karim Dridi
- 2003: Les clés de bagnole, directed by Laurent Baffie
- 2004: Pour le plaisir, directed by Dominique Dureddere
- 2004: The bridge of San Luis Rey, directed by Mary Mac Guckian
- 2005: The Last Sign, directed by Douglas Law
- 2006: Le passager de l'été, directed by Florence Moncorge Gabin
- 2006: Cars, Studio Pixar / Disney
- 2006: Frontière(s) (Frontier(s)), directed by Xavier Gens
- 2006: L’homme de sable, directed by Jose-Manuel Gonzalez
- 2008: Disco, directed by Fabien Onteniente
- 2008: Des poupées et des anges, directed by Nora Hamdi
- 2008: L’ennemi public N°1, directed by Jean-François Richet
- 2011: Cornuaille, directed by Anne Le Ny
- 2014: Les Yeux jaunes des crocodiles, directed by Cécile Telerman

=== Television ===
- 1988: La Chaîne, directed by Claude Faraldo
- 1988: Tempête sur la manche directed by Edouard Logereau
- 1993: L'Homme du banc, directed by Etienne Périer
- 1997: L'Amour à vif, directed by Jean-Pierre Ameris
- 2004: 93, Rue Lauriston, directed by Denys Granier-Deferre
- 2014 -2023 : Alex Hugo TV series. In the US "The Mountain Detective."

== Theatre ==
- 1993 La mégère apprivoisée, Mise en scène : Jérôme Savary de William Shakespeare
- 1999 Un tramway nommé Désir, Mise en scène: Philippe Adriende Tennessee Williams
- 2005 Brooklyn boy, Mise en scène : Michel Fagadau de Donald Margulies
- 2009 Paroles et Guerison, Mise en scene: Didier Long
- 2011 Hollywood, Mise en scene: Daniel Colas

=== Music videos ===
- 2004: "Qui suis-je?" Kool Shen (actor: Jo Prestia) Directed by J.G Biggs .

== Additional activities ==
Le Bihan was the main sponsor of the French charity organization called "November in Childhood." He is also a supporter of the international humanitarian organization Action Against Hunger.
