= Christine Citti =

French actress, director and writer

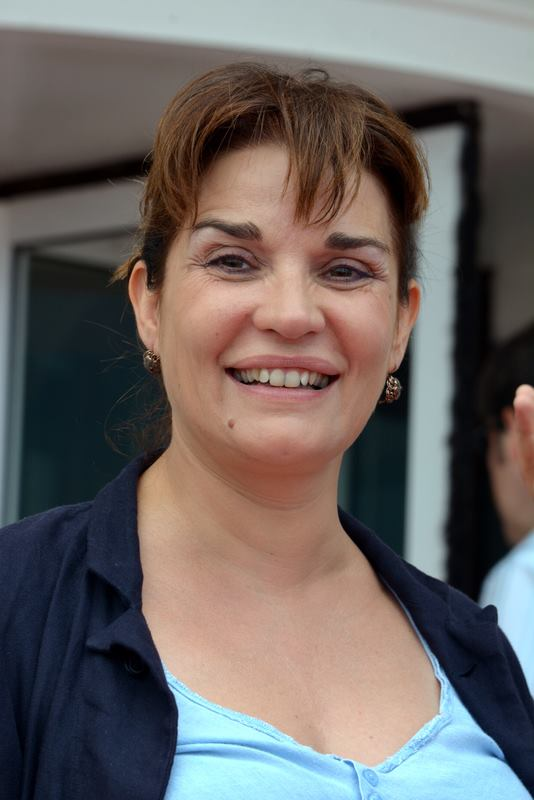
- Christine Citti at the 2014 Cabourg Film Festival
- Born: 26 October 1962 (age 62); Paris, France
- Occupation(s): Actress, Director, Writer
- Years active: 1980–present

Christine Citti (born 26 October 1962 in Paris) is a French actress, director and writer.

== Personal life ==
Her brother, Marc Citti, is also actor. Her father was mayor of Ramoulu in the Loiret from 1995 to 2008.

== Filmography ==
=== Actress ===
| Year | Title | Role | Director | Notes |
|---|---|---|---|---|
| 1981 | Le voyage d'hiver | The woman | Fred de Fooko | Short |
| 1986 | La galette du roi | Irina von Stoffen | Jean-Michel Ribes | |
| 1986 | Pékin Central | Valérie Mareuil | Camille de Casabianca | |
| 1986 | Le véto | | Daniel Moosmann | TV series (1 episode) |
| 1989 | Manon Roland | Sophie | Édouard Molinaro | TV movie |
| 1989 | La vallée des espoirs | Jeanne | Jean-Pierre Marchand | TV mini-series |
| 1990 | Ivanov | Sacha | Arnaud Sélignac | TV movie |
| 1990 | Les Cinq Dernières Minutes | Caro | Jean-Pierre Marchand (2) | TV series (1 episode) |
| 1991 | La thune | The journalist | Philippe Galland | |
| 1991 | L'Amour maudit de Leisenbohg | Sabine | Édouard Molinaro (2) | TV movie |
| 1991 | Chronique d'une fin d'après-midi | Macha | Pierre Romans | TV movie |
| 1994 | Consentement mutuel | Jeanne's sister | Bernard Stora | |
| 1995 | George Sand, une femme libre | George Sand | Gérard Poitou-Weber | TV movie |
| 1995 | Danse avec la vie | The Gym teacher | Michel Favart | TV movie |
| 1996 | Les sacs | The woman | Frédéric Krivine | Short |
| 1996 | Le fou de la tour | Sonia | Luc Béraud | TV movie |
| 1996 | Le tuteur | Agnès | Fabien Onteniente | TV movie |
| 1996 | Les enfants du mensonge | Christine | Frédéric Krivine (2) | TV movie |
| 1997 | L'instit | Paule Thiriet | Pascale Dallet | TV series (1 episode) |
| 1997-99 | P.J. | Jeannine Léonetti | Gérard Vergez | TV series (13 episodes) |
| 1998 | Une grosse bouchée d'amour | Sophie | Michaëla Watteaux | TV movie |
| 1998 | Week-end ! | Cathy | Arnaud Sélignac (2) | TV movie |
| 1998 | Une voix en or | Catherine | Michelle Allen & Patrick Volson | TV mini-series |
| 1999 | It All Starts Today | Mrs. Baudoin | Bertrand Tavernier | |
| 2000 | Taking Wing | Stan's mother | Steve Suissa | |
| 2000 | Le coeur à l'ouvrage | Mrs. Combescot | Laurent Dussaux | |
| 2000 | Mamirolle | Silvana | Brigitte Coscas | |
| 2000 | Petite soeur | Carole | Patrick Poubel | TV movie |
| 2000 | La double vie de Jeanne | Didou | Henri Helman | TV movie |
| 2000 | L'amour sur un fil | Aurélie | Michaëla Watteaux (2) | TV movie |
| 2000 | Victoire, ou la douleur des femmes | Jeannette | Nadine Trintignant | TV mini-series |
| 2000 | Boulevard du Palais | Christine Garrec | Jacques Malaterre | TV series (1 episode) |
| 2001 | Un coeur oublié | Madame de Marcillac | Philippe Monnier | TV movie |
| 2001 | Crimes en série | The mistaken woman | Patrick Dewolf | TV series (1 episode) |
| 2001-05 | Les enquêtes d'Éloïse Rome | Éloïse Rome | Christophe Douchand, Denys Granier-Deferre, ... | TV series (24 episodes) |
| 2002 | Madame Sans-Gêne | Sophie | Philippe de Broca | TV movie |
| 2003 | Les enfants du miracle | Véronique Lacaze | Sébastien Grall | TV movie |
| 2005 | Majorité | The mother | Phil Sfezzywan | Short |
| 2005 | L'arbre et l'oiseau | Juliette | Marc Rivière | TV movie |
| 2005 | Rosalie s'en va | Rosalie | Jean-Dominique de La Rochefoucauld | TV movie |
| 2005 | La famille Zappon | Tia | Amar Arhab & Fabrice Michelin | TV movie |
| 2005 | La vie à mains nues | Ginette | Sébastien Grall (2) | TV movie |
| 2005 | Mes deux maris | Muriel | Henri Helman (2) | TV movie |
| 2005 | Brasier | Hélène | Arnaud Sélignac (3) | TV movie |
| 2005 | Jeff et Léo, flics et jumeaux | Geneviève Declercq | Étienne Dhaene | TV series (1 episode) |
| 2006 | When I Was a Singer | Michèle | Xavier Giannoli | Nominated - César Award for Best Supporting Actress |
| 2006 | The Page Turner | Madame Prouvost | Denis Dercourt | |
| 2006 | Suzanne | Suzanne | Viviane Candas | |
| 2006 | Camping | Madame Chatel | Fabien Onteniente (2) | |
| 2007 | Le réveillon des bonnes | Marie | Michel Hassan | TV mini-series |
| 2008 | Born in 68 | Maryse | Olivier Ducastel & Jacques Martineau | |
| 2008 | Disco | Coco | Fabien Onteniente (3) | |
| 2008 | Fool Moon | Chris | Jérôme L'hotsky | |
| 2008 | Sans état d'âme | Fauconnier | Vincenzo Marano | |
| 2008 | Animal singulier | Dr. Gachet | Hélène Guétary | Short |
| 2008 | C'est mieux la vie quand on est grand | Rosy | Luc Béraud (2) | TV movie |
| 2009 | I'm Glad My Mother Is Alive | Annie Jouvet | Claude Miller & Nathan Miller | |
| 2009 | Villa Belle France | Odile | Karim Akadiri Soumaïla | TV movie |
| 2009 | Comme un mauvais souvenir | Jeanne Boissac | André Chandelle | TV movie |
| 2009 | Ticket gagnant | Béatrice Delavenne | Julien Weill | TV movie |
| 2009 | Suite noire | Vanessa | Emmanuelle Bercot | TV series (1 episode) |
| 2009-13 | Drôle de famille ! | Juliette | Stéphane Clavier, Benoît d'Aubert, ... | TV series (4 episodes) |
| 2010 | What War May Bring | The poisoner | Claude Lelouch | |
| 2010 | Camping 2 | Madame Chatel | Fabien Onteniente (4) | |
| 2010 | Un divorce de chien | Sophie | Lorraine Lévy | TV movie |
| 2011 | À mi-chemin | Samuel's wife | Arnaud Bénoliel | Short |
| 2011 | La nuit du réveillon | Sylviane Violet | Serge Meynard | TV movie |
| 2012 | Mince alors! | Roxanne's mother | Charlotte de Turckheim | |
| 2012 | Kill Me | Claudine | Emily Atef | |
| 2012 | À dix minutes des naturistes | Valérie | Stéphane Clavier (2) | TV movie |
| 2012 | La danse de l'albatros | Laurence | Nathan Miller (2) | TV movie |
| 2012 | Clash | Annie Boitel | Pascal Lahmani | TV series (2 episodes) |
| 2013 | Girl on a Bicycle | Dominique | Jeremy Leven | |
| 2013 | Ce monde est fou | Florence Damier-Bechard | Badreddine Mokrani | TV movie |
| 2014 | Valentin Valentin | Antonia | Pascal Thomas | |
| 2014 | Deux petites filles en bleu | Stéphanie | Jean-Marc Thérin | TV movie |
| 2014 | Caïn | Jeanne Lestral | Benoît d'Aubert (2) | TV series (1 episode) |
| 2015 | J'ai épousé un inconnu | Dominique | Serge Meynard (2) | TV movie |
| 2015 | Le sang de la vigne | Captain Nelly Souchard | Aruna Villiers | TV series (1 episode) |
| 2016 | The Origin of Violence | Marguerite Fabre | Élie Chouraqui | |
| 2016 | Going to Brazil | Michèle | Patrick Mille | |

=== Director / Writer ===
| Year | Title | Notes |
|---|---|---|
| 1991 | Le bateau de Lu | Short |
| 1993 | Rupture(s) | |

== Theatre ==
| Year | Title | Author | Director |
|---|---|---|---|
| 1980 | A Respectable Wedding | Bertolt Brecht | Jean-François Prévand |
| 1981 | Molière mort ou vif | Jean-François Prévand | Jean-François Prévand (2) |
| 1982 | Henry IV | Luigi Pirandello | Jacques Mauclair |
| 1987 | La Ronde | Arthur Schnitzler | Alfredo Arias |
| 1987 | The Mistress of the Inn | Carlo Goldoni | Alfredo Arias (2) |
| 1988 | Three Sisters | Anton Chekhov | Maurice Bénichou |
| 1989 | Ivanov | Anton Chekhov | Pierre Romans |
| 1993 | The Seagull | Anton Chekhov | Michel Fagadau |
| 1995 | Casanova, ou les fantômes de la passion | Jacques Seiler | Jacques Seiler |
| 1995 | Arloc | Serge Kribus | Jorge Lavelli |
| 1998 | Flip ! | Tom Rooney | Roger Mirmont |
| 2006 | Miss Julie | August Strindberg | Didier Long |
| 2009 | Les Fiancés de Loches | Georges Feydeau | Jean-Louis Martinelli |
| 2013 | Le Prix Martin | Eugène Labiche | Peter Stein |
| 2014 | Je ne serai plus jamais vieille | Fabienne Perineau | Jean-Louis Martinelli (2) |
| 2015 | The Miser | Molière | Jean-Louis Martinelli (3) |
