= Pelloux =

Pelloux is a surname. Notable people with the surname include:

- Luigi Pelloux (1839–1924), Italian general and politician
- Patrick Pelloux (born 1963), French physician and activist
