= Turf (film) =

2013 French comedy film

- Theatrical release poster
- Directed by: Fabien Onteniente
- Written by: Pierre Bénichou; Emmanuel Booz; Philippe Guillard; Fabien Onteniente
- Produced by: Alain Chabat
- Starring: Alain Chabat; Édouard Baer; Lucien Jean-Baptiste; Philippe Duquesne; Gérard Depardieu
- Music by: Jean-Yves D'Angelo
- Production company: Chez Wam
- Distributed by: Pathé Films
- Release date: February 13, 2013 (France)
- Running time: 102 minutes
- Country: France
- Language: French
- Budget: €23 million

Turf is a 2013 French comedy film directed by Fabien Onteniente, and starring Alain Chabat, Édouard Baer, Lucien Jean-Baptiste, Philippe Duquesne and Gérard Depardieu. It tells the story of four unsuccessful horse racing bettors who try to improve their fortunes with the help of a scheme. The film received unenthusiastic reviews and failed at the box office.

== Plot ==
Four friends, Nikos, Freddy, Fortuné and Fifi, keep betting and losing on horse races. Frustrated with their lack of success, they consider quitting, but a veteran bettor, Mr. Paul, proposes a miraculous scheme: they can pool their money to become co-owners of an unbeatable horse (in reality, it’s an old nag).

== Cast ==
- Alain Chabat as Nikos Fivos, a.k.a. "the Greek"
- Édouard Baer as Freddy
- Lucien Jean-Baptiste as Fortuné
- Philippe Duquesne as Fifi
- Vahina Giocante as Banette Delgado
- Sergi López as Mr. Delgado
- Gérard Depardieu as Mr. Paul
- Helena Noguerra as Christine, Nikos's wife
- Xavier Beauvois as Commissioner Dubiton
- Dave Wong as Mr. Li
- Quentin Merabet as William
- Sonia Jean-Baptiste as bettor
- Pierre Bénichou as bettor
- Marthe Villalonga as Mrs Garcia, Fifi's mother
- Nanou Garcia as Mrs Marquez
- Alex Lutz as Baron de Sonneville
- Jérôme Commandeur as Jean-Bruno
- Rolland Courbis as himself
- Charles Gérard as Casquette
- Valéry Zeitoun as Mr. Beretta
- Cristiana Reali as posh woman
- Thierry Roland as himself
- Laurent Broomhead as TV host
- Sophie Thalmann as TV host
- Pierre Ménès as TV commentator
- Frigide Barjot as party guest
- Nikos Aliagas as party host

== Production ==
Principal photography began in 2011. The script was co-written by veteran journalist Pierre Bénichou, who had no experience as a screenwriter but was a horse racing expert. The production partnered with Pari mutuel urbain, the consortium in charge of horse betting in France. This allowed the film to be shot on location at various French horse racing tracks, including the Chantilly Racecourse, the Auteuil Hippodrome and the Hippodrome de la Côte d'Azur. The film had a budget of 23 million euros, a considerable amount by French standards.

Several years later, in the context of the sexual assault accusations against Gérard Depardieu, director Fabien Onteniente said that he had to reprimand the actor after he behaved improperly with an extra during production. In 2026, on-set footage was released that showed Depardieu groping an extra during the filming of a scene at a racecourse. The website Mediapart interviewed the woman, who said that Depardieu's behavior had occurred with several hundred people present and the actor unfazed by the crowd, and that the casting director had to physically position herself between her and Depardieu during filming.

== Reception ==
Critical reception in France was mixed to negative upon release. The film was unsuccessful at the French box office, selling 380,756 admissions. Le Point described it as one of the worst flops of 2013, and as a symbol of the disastrous state of French comedy during that period — featuring actors just collecting a paycheck, unfunny dialogue, and a lazy screenplay.

== Home media ==
Turf was released on DVD and Blu-Ray, and on VOD on various streaming services.
