= All Inclusive (2019 film) =

- Theatrical release poster
- Directed by: Fabien Onteniente
- Written by: Franck Dubosc; Fabien Onteniente; Guy Laurent
- Produced by: Vivien Aslanian; Olivier Delbosc; Romain Le Grand; Marco Pacchioni
- Starring: Franck Dubosc; François-Xavier Demaison; Josiane Balasko; Thierry Lhermitte
- Cinematography: Pierric Gantelmi d'Ille
- Music by: Benjamin Biolay; Dany Synthé
- Production companies: Curiosa Films; Marvelous Productions
- Distributed by: Warner Bros. Pictures
- Release date: 13 February 2019
- Running time: 92 minutes
- Country: France
- Language: French
- Budget: $17.5 million
- Box office: $6.5 million

All Inclusive is a French 2019 film directed by Fabien Onteniente.

== Plot ==
Jean-Paul Cisse (Frank Dubosc), suddenly appears around a group of travelers going on vacations to the beach before taking the bus. A couple recently had an argument, the wife leaves the husband alone for the trip (the trip being a prize he won for the couple), Jean Paul quickly approaches him to provide advice. The husband is focused on calling her to get her back but Jean Paul insists on leaving her alone and enjoying the trip. Next, a series of adventures and funny moments take place among the group who eventually become sort of friends. Things get intense when Jean Paul can't find his luggage and the system can't provide a private room for him. So, both recent friends move together to the suite for married couples. To avoid being kicked out from the special suite and keeping the treats coming from the hotel, they both have to appear as a gay couple to please the constant checks by the general manager who at some point tries some flirting over both. The comedy is family friendly.

== Cast ==
- Franck Dubosc : Jean-Paul Cisse
- François-Xavier Demaison : Bruno Morin
- Josiane Balasko : Lulu
- Thierry Lhermitte : Edouard Laurent
- Amelle Chahbi : Sonia
- Caroline Anglade : Caroline
- Yvick Letexier : Pépito
- Camille Lavabre : Camille
- Victor Belmondo : Thibault
- Maïwenn : Paloma
- Kev Adams : The man at the airport

== Production ==
Principal photography on the film began on 14 May 2018 and lasted until 4 July 2018 in Guadeloupe.
