= Alix Bénézech =

French actress (born 1991)

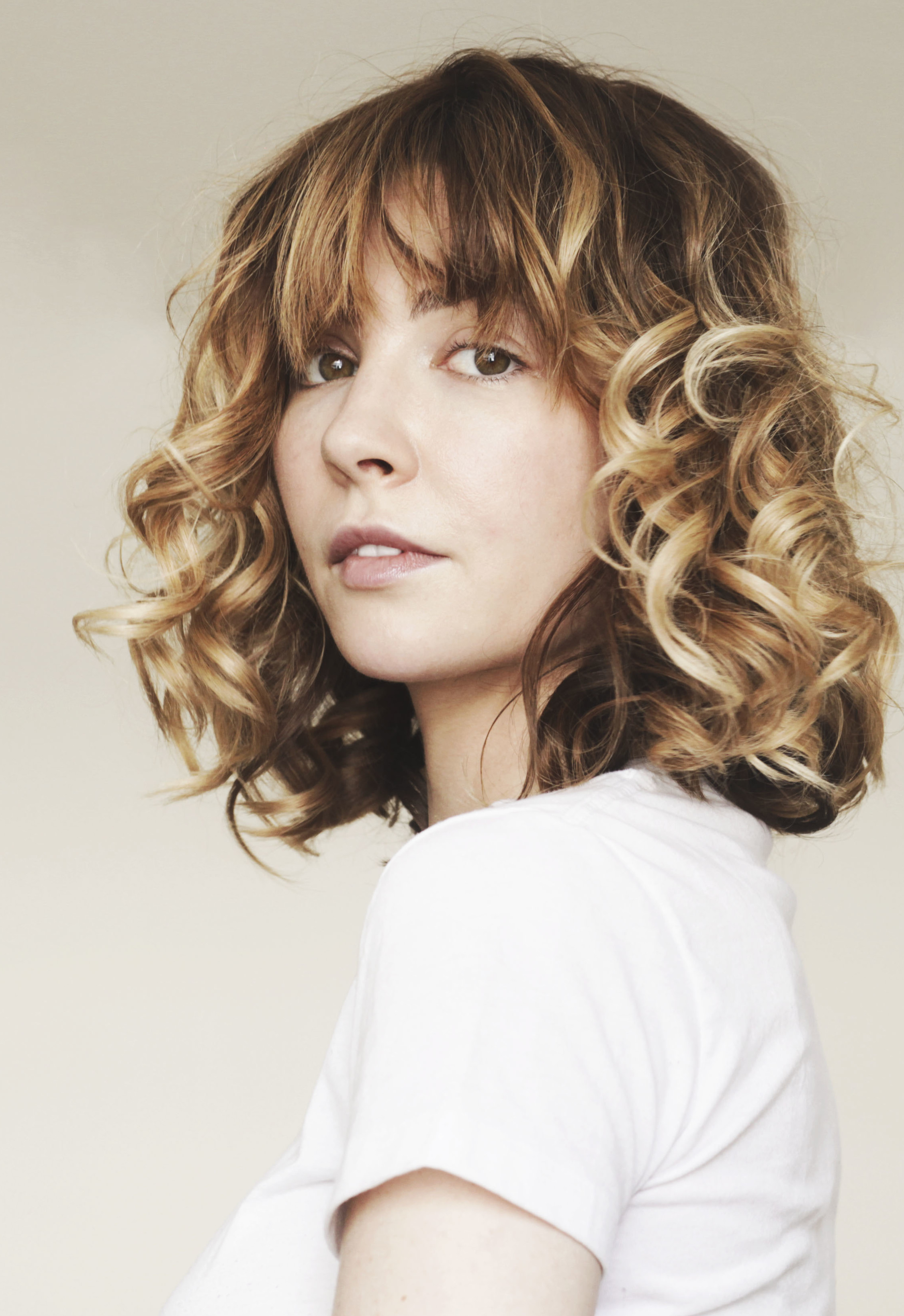
- Alix Bénézech in 2017.
- Born: Alix Bénézech; 1991 (age 34–35); Wissembourg, Alsace, France
- Occupation: Actress
- Notable work: Summertime (2015)

Alix Bénézech is a French actress.

== Biography ==
Alix Bénézech was raised in Alsace and the south of France.

She holds a bachelor's degree with honors and a master's degree in modern literature while taking singing, dance and acting lessons. She speaks French, English and German.

In 2018, Alix Bénézech was chosen to be the heart godmother of the Haute couture Franck Sorbier fashion show and she was the muse of the new Mod's Hair campaign and became the first actress ambassador for Jaguar.

== Filmography ==
=== Film ===
- 2009: OPEN 24/7 as Telma (short film)
- 2010: Black Venus as La Marquise audacieuse
- 2011: Train-Potins as Mlle Y. (short film)
- 2012: On the Other Side of the Tracks
- 2013: Le Quepa sur la vilni ! as Jeanne (short film)
- 2014: Moonlight Serenade as Miss France (short film)
- 2015: Bis as Sandrine
- 2015: L'Odeur de la mandarine as Louison
- 2015: Summertime as L'étudiante aux Beaux-Arts
- 2016: Camping 3 as Manon
- 2017: Fractures as Jenny
- 2017: La Boulangerie as Claudia (short film)
- 2018: Like Wolves and Lambs as Robin (short film)
- 2018: The 15:17 to Paris as Server
- 2018: Mission: Impossible – Fallout as French Policewoman

=== Television ===
- 2011: Plus belle la vie (season 8) as Colombe Roussin
- 2013: Nos chers voisins as Lola Langlois
- 2014: Fais pas ci, fais pas ça (season 6, episode 3) as la vendeuse de luxe
- 2014: R.I.S, police scientifique (season 9, episode 7) as Alix
- 2015: Napoléon, la campagne de Russie : Catherine Pavlovna de Russie
- 2015–2018: Nina (season 1–4) as Dorothée Ariès
- 2016: Qui sème l’amour... as Sophie
- 2016: Mallory as Maire Legeay
- 2017: Le Sang de la vigne (season 7, episode 2) as Daisy Cabannes
- 2017: Alice Nevers, le juge est une femme (season 15, episode 9) as Noémie Fournier
- 2018: Cassandre (season 3, episode 3) as Adèle Pelias
- 2019: Whiskey Cavalier (season 1, episode 4) as General Costa Mistress

== Theater ==
- 2010/2011 : Le Fantôme de l’Opéra by Henri Lazarini as Christine Daaé
- 2012 : Les Serments Indiscrets by Anne-Marie Lazarini as Lucile
- 2013 : Elvira by Jean-Claude Scionico asElvira
- 2015 : Blanche Neige ou la Chute du Mur de Berlin by Métilde Weyergan and Samuel Hercule as Ida
- 2017 : Fragments by Marilyn Monroe
- 2018 : A Fleur de Mots by Jean-Pierre Baro as Lisa
- 2019 : Les Rivaux by Anne-Marie Lazarini as Lydia Languish

== Awards ==
=== Winner ===
- 2011: Prix d'Interprétation of the Festival Ciné Poche for Train-Potins
- 2016: Prix d'Interprétation of the Festival Les Hérault du Cinéma et de la Télé for Bis
- 2017: Best Actress of the Festival Feel the Reel International Film and Honourable Mention of the Festival Howling Wolf Film for La Boulangerie

=== Nominee ===
- 2014 : Lutin de la Meilleure Actrice of Les Lutins du Court Métrage for Le Quepa sur la vilni !
