= Danse avec lui =

- Directed by: Valérie Guignabodet
- Written by: Valérie Guignabodet
- Produced by: Philippe Godeau
- Starring: Mathilde Seigner; Sami Frey
- Cinematography: Denis Rouden
- Edited by: Thierry Derocles
- Music by: Jean-Claude Petit
- Production company: Pan-Européenne
- Distributed by: Wild Bunch Distribution
- Release date: 21 February 2007
- Running time: 118 minutes
- Country: France
- Language: French
- Budget: $9.6 million
- Box office: $7 million

Danse avec lui is a French drama film directed by Valérie Guignabodet released in 2007 starring Mathilde Seigner and Sami Frey.

== Plot ==
Three years after a dramatic rupture and a serious horse fall that have deeply changed her life, Alexandra Balzan (Mathilde Seigner), a Parisian architect, learns again how to live and love after the emotional meeting of an old misanthrope equestrian (Sami Frey) and his horse, in an abandoned equestrian center in Beauvais.

== Cast ==
- Mathilde Seigner as Alexandra Balzan
- Sami Frey as The Horseman
- Jean-François Pignon as Miguel
- Anny Duperey as Alexandra's mother
- Anne Le Guernec as Alexandra's sister
- Anthony Delon as Paul Balzan
- Jean Dell as Daniel
- Élodie Navarre as Lucie
- Camille Varenne as Amélie
- Laurent Bateau as The man at the bar

== See also ==
- List of films bout horses
