= Anne Le Guernec =

French actress and director

Anne Le Guernec is a French actress and director, known to English-speaking audiences for her appearance in George R. R. Martin's Doorways.

== Early life ==
Le Guernec was born in Suresnes, France. She developed an interest in acting during high school and studied under Madeleine Marion and performed in The Cherry Orchard by Anton Chekhov and in The Lady from the Sea by Henrik Ibsen. She did a degree in Theatre Studies at Théâtre du Lycée Renoir.

== Career ==
Soon after graduation she started to work in films and television, including roles in Charlotte for Ever and Les Enfants du marais. Her first American production was the pilot for George R. R. Martin's Doorways. She has also consistently worked in theatre, both acting and directing, including performances in works by Molière, Marina Carr, John Millington Synge, Albert Camus, Jean-Paul Sartre, and Martin Crimp.

== Filmography ==
=== Film ===
- 1986 : Charlotte for Ever
- 1994 : Doorways
- 1998 : Les Enfants du marais
- 2000 : Cet amour-là
- 2006 : Danse avec lui
- 2009 : La Tête en friche

==== Dubbing ====
- 2012 : Foxfire
- 2012 : Anna Karénine
- 2012 : My Week with Marilyn

=== Television ===
- 1990 : Intrigues (TF1) (in 3 episodes)
- 1992 : Doorways
- 1992 : Extrême Limite (episode: Le Vol d'Icare)
- 1999 : Mary Lester
- 2001 : L'Instit (episode: La Main dans la main)
- 2002 : Navarro (episode: Voleur sans défense)
- 2007 : Avocats et Associés (episode: Eau trouble)
- 2013 : Vogue la vie (episode: Corinne)
