= Incognito (2009 film) =

- Film poster
- Directed by: Éric Lavaine
- Written by: Éric Lavaine; Héctor Cabello Reyes; Bénabar
- Produced by: François Cornuau; Vincent Roget; Genevieve Lemal
- Starring: Bénabar; Franck Dubosc; Jocelyn Quivrin; Anne Marivin; Isabelle Nanty; Virginie Hocq; Yolande Moreau
- Cinematography: Stéphane Cami
- Edited by: Vincent Zuffranieri
- Music by: Bénabar
- Production companies: SCOPE Invest; Same Player; Pathé
- Distributed by: Pathé
- Release date: 29 April 2009
- Running time: 93 minutes
- Country: France
- Language: French
- Budget: $10 million
- Box office: $10.5 million

Incognito is a 2009 French comedy film directed by Éric Lavaine. Starring Bénabar, Franck Dubosc, Jocelyn Quivrin. The film was released on April 29, 2009.

== Plot ==
Luka, singer-guitarist of Orly Sud underground rock band in the 1990s, ten years later became the king of the new French pop-rock scene by appropriating the songs of a blue notebook fell from a low cover while looking for pictures of his former band. He thinks that these are the songs of his friend Thomas, former bassist Orly Sud disappeared for several years. One day, Thomas reappears ... So start with Luka three days of ordeal during which he must conceal his immense celebrity. He then decides to convince Thomas that he is still at RATP controller and his luxury home and its Mercedes-Benz owned his freeloading Francis buddy blundering, Mime roommate who struggles to break and that Luka posing as a "comedian full of loot."

== Cast ==
- Bénabar as Lucas
- Franck Dubosc as Francis
- Jocelyn Quivrin as Thomas
- Anne Marivin as Marion
- Isabelle Nanty as Alexandra
- Virginie Hocq as Géraldine
- Yolande Moreau as Mme Champenard
- Gérard Loussine as Pasquier
- François Damiens as The driver
- Pierre Palmade as himself
- Michel Denisot as himself
- Patrick Pelloux as The nurse
