= Maison de retraite =

- Poster
- French: Maison de retraite
- Directed by: Thomas Gilou
- Written by: Kev Adams; Catherine Diament
- Produced by: Stanislas Wawrinka; Élisa Soussan
- Starring: Kev Adams; Gérard Depardieu; Daniel Prévost; Marthe Villalonga; Firmine Richard
- Cinematography: Pierric Gantelmi d'Ille
- Edited by: Sandro Lavezzi
- Music by: Julien Cohen
- Production company: My Family
- Release date: 21 February 2022 (France)
- Running time: 97 minutes
- Country: France
- Language: French

Maison de retraite (English: "Retirement Home") is a 2022 French comedy film directed by Thomas Gilou and written by Kev Adams and Catherine Diament. The film revolves around Milann (Adams), an orphan who turns to a life of crime and is sentenced to community service at a retirement home, where he clashes with the residents.The film was followed by a 2024 sequel, Maison de retraite 2.

== Cast ==
- Kev Adams as Milann Rousseau
- Gérard Depardieu as Lino Vartan
- Daniel Prévost as Alfred de Gonzague
- Mylène Demongeot as Simone Tournier
- Jean-Luc Bideau as Edmond Van de Wer
- Liliane Rovère as Sylvette Leroux
- Firmine Richard as Fleurette Jean-Marie
- Marthe Villalonga as Claudine Valège
- Marianne Garcia as Léontine
- Antoine Duléry as Daniel Ferrand
- Jarry as Alban
- Manda Touréas Marion
