= It Takes Two to Tango (film) =

2025 French film by Jean-Pierre Améris

- French: Aimons-nous vivants
- Directed by: Jean-Pierre Améris
- Written by: Jean-Pierre Améris; Marion Michau
- Produced by: Sophie Révil; Denis Carot
- Starring: Gérard Darmon; Valérie Lemercier
- Music by: Stéphane Moucha
- Release date: 2025
- Running time: 90 minutes
- Country: France
- Language: French

It Takes Two to Tango (French: Aimons-nous vivants, pronounced [ɛ̃.mɔ̃ nu vi.vɑ̃]), is a 2025 French buddy sentimental comedy film written and directed by Jean-Pierre Améris. It stars Gérard Darmon and Valérie Lemercier. The plot of the film is inspired by the euthanasia.;

== Plot ==
At seventy years old, Antoine Toussaint, a famous singer, is knowing he will never be able to perform on stage again and decides to resort to assisted suicide in Switzerland. On the TGV train to Geneva, he meets Victoire, a vivacious woman in her fifties, who has been released from prison for the weekend to attend her daughter's wedding.

Through many vicissitudes, Victoire manages to change Antoine's opinion; the two fall in love, and when she is released from prison, he waits for her to flee to Argentina.

== Cast ==
- Gérard Darmon: as Antoine Toussaint
- Valérie Lemercier: as Victoire
- Patrick Timsit: as Claude, Antoine's manager
- Alice de Lencquesaing: Constance, Victoire's daughter
- Éric Viellard: Victoire's ex-husband
- Antoine Mathieu: Yves-Marie, member of Eeuthanasia Association
- Jean-Pierre Gos: Grand Hotel barman in Geneva
- Nicole Dubois: Mariette, Claude's secretary
- Aurélien Cavagna: Baptiste, Constance's husband
- Sophie Mounicot: Catherine, Baptiste's mother
- François Berland: Laurent, Baptiste's father
- Tobias Nuytten: Grand Hotel maitre
- Isabelle Menke: Motel Azur receptionist
- Christian Dustour: police at airport

== Reception ==
The film was released in France on 16 April 2025, and in Hungary on following 31 July.
