= Jet Set (film) =

- Film poster
- Directed by: Fabien Onteniente
- Written by: Caroline Saillo
- Screenplay by: Fabien Onteniente; Bruno Solo; Emmanuel de Brantes; Olivier Chavarot
- Produced by: Eric Altmayer; Nicolas Altmayer; Javier Castro
- Starring: Bruno Solo; Samuel Le Bihan; Lambert Wilson; Ornella Muti
- Cinematography: Franco Di Giacomo
- Edited by: Nathalie Hubert
- Music by: Loïc Dury; Christophe Minck
- Production company: Mandarin Production
- Distributed by: BAC Films
- Release date: 14 June 2000 (France)
- Running time: 105 minutes
- Country: France
- Language: French
- Budget: €5.6 million
- Box office: US$14.3 million

Jet Set is a 2000 French comedy film, directed by Fabien Onteniente. A sequel, People, was released in 2004.

== Plot ==
Jimmy (Bruno Solo), desperate to save his suburban bar from bankruptcy, conceives a plan to attract the "jet set", the rich and glamorous celebrities of France. He sends his friend Mike (Samuel Le Bihan), a down-at-heel unemployed actor, to infiltrate French high society and garner contacts with prestigious personalities to invite. Hijinks ensue.

== Cast ==
- Samuel Le Bihan as Mickaël Gonzalvez aka « Mike »
- Lambert Wilson as Artus de Poulignac
- Ornella Muti as Camilla
- Ariadna Gil as Andréa
- Bruno Solo as Jimmy
- José Garcia as Mellor de Silva
- Aurore Clément as Nicole
- Estelle Larrivaz as Lydia
- Lorànt Deutsch as Fifi
- Elli Medeiros as Danielle Joubert
- Antoinette Moya as M^{me} Gonzalvez
- Guillaume Gallienne as Evrard Sainte Croix
- Armelle as Frénégonde
- Valérie Benguigui as The Baroness
- Adel Kachermi as Himself

== Reception ==
The film sold well at the Cannes Film Festival. It opened on almost 500 screens in France and debuted at number one with 428,000 admissions in its opening week.
