= Cristiana Reali =

Brazilian actress (born 1965)

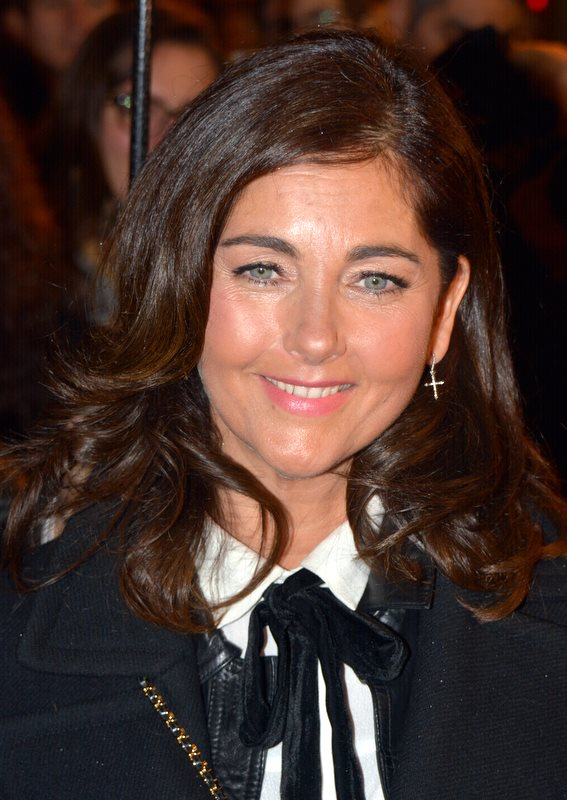
- Reali in 2017
- Born: 16 March 1965 (age 61); São Paulo, Brazil
- Occupation: Actress
- Years active: 1989–present

Cristiana Reali (born 16 March 1965) is a Brazilian actress. She has appeared in numerous theatre pieces, television series, and films.

== Biography ==
Reali was born in São Paulo, Brazil, the daughter of Brazilian journalist Elpídio Reali Júnior. Cristiana emigrated to France along with her family at a young age. She graduated from the Lycée Molière in Paris (high school equivalent), then studied theatre with her future husband, Francis Huster at the Cours Florent.

== Personal life ==
In March 2009, she was reported to be dating American actor and director John Malkovich.

== Filmography ==
=== Film ===
Year	Title	Director	Role
1989	Monsieur Hire	Patrice Leconte	L'adolescente au bowling
1992	L'Inconnu dans la maison	Georges Lautner	Isabelle Loursat
1993	Tout ça... pour ça !	Claude Lelouch	Brésilienne
1997	Une femme très très amoureuse	Ariel Zeitoun	Florence
2004	Le Genre humain	Claude Lelouch	La vendeuse de la joaillerie
2005	Le courage d'aimer	Claude Lelouch	La vendeuse de la bijouterie
2008	Deux jours à tuer	Jean Becker	Virginie - l'aguicheuse
2008	A Man and His Dog	Francis Huster	Femme parc
2013	Turf	Fabien Onteniente	La femme élégante
2013	Le grand méchant loup	Nicolas Charlet	Eléonore de Saint-André
2015	Qui c'est les plus forts?	Charlotte de Turckheim	La mère
2016	Camping 3	Fabien Onteniente	Clotilde
2024	Jamais sans mon Psy	Arnaud Lemort	Paloma Bérenger

=== Television ===
Year	Title	Director	Role	Notes
1994	Le raisin d'or	Joël Séria	Juliet Sabatou	TV film
1995	Terre indigo	Jean Sagols	Constance	
1998	La Dame aux camélias	Jean-Claude Brialy	Marguerite Gautier	TV film
2000	L'Amour sur le fil	Michaela Watteaux	Sandrine	TV film
2000	Phobie	Arnaud Selignac		
2002	Si j'étais lui	Philippe Triboit	Ariane	TV film
2003	La tranchée des espoirs	Jean-Louis Lorenzi	Sylvaine Morillon	TV film
2004	Quand la mer se retire	Laurent Heynemann	Valérie	TV film
2004	Le Miroir de l'eau	Edwin Baily	Gabrielle Castella	
2005	Le Bal des célibataires	Jean-Louis Lorenzi	Sylvaine	TV film
2007	Chat bleu, chat noir	Jean-Louis Lorenzi	Sylvaine	
2007	Où es-tu ?	Miguel Courtois	Marie	
2007	Épuration	Jean-Louis Lorenzi	Sylvaine	TV film
2007	Une suite pour deux	Didier Albert	Julie	
2008	Où es-tu ?	Miguel Courtois	Marie	
2009	La maitresse du président	Jean-Pierre Sinapi	Marguerite	
2015	Meurtres en Bourgogne	Jérôme Navarro	Mylène Deville	
