= Camping 2 =

- Theatrical release poster
- Directed by: Fabien Onteniente
- Written by: Emanuel Booz; Franck Dubosc; Philippe Guillard; Fabien Onteniente
- Produced by: Patrice Ledoux; Serge Hayat
- Starring: Franck Dubosc; Richard Anconina; Mathilde Seigner; Antoine Duléry; Claude Brasseur; Mylène Demongeot
- Cinematography: Jérôme Robert
- Edited by: Véronique Lange
- Music by: Frédéric Botton; Jean Yves d'Angelo; Philippe Kelly; Alexis Rault
- Production companies: Pathé; TF1 Films Production; Pulsar Productions
- Distributed by: Pathé
- Release date: 21 April 2010
- Running time: 99 minutes
- Country: France
- Language: French
- Budget: €25.7 million
- Box office: $33.9 million

Camping 2 is a 2010 French comedy film directed by Fabien Onteniente. It is the sequel to the 2006 film Camping. The third installment of the film series, Camping 3, was released in 2016. It is the second installment in the Camping film series.

== Plot ==
Upset that his fiancee wants to take a break in their relationship, and to reduce his stress levels, Jean-Pierre Savelli, an insurance company employee in Clermont-Ferrand, decides to spend his holiday in an unusual place for him - the Blue Waves campsite, near Arcachon. There he meets eager campers including Patrick Chirac, and begins to act as a single man again. At first put off by Patrick's overtures of friendship, the two become best friends, as Jean-Pierre begins to "loosen up" a bit. Taking a lead from Patrick, Jean-Pierre gradually acquires the same outlook on life and even becomes the new darling of Blue Waves, which makes Patrick jealous. Patrick begins to cause discord in the camp, although the other campers (Jacky, Paulo, Laurette and Sophie) are already ill-humored, all the more so when it is revealed that the "Blue Waves" campsite may be sold to a Spanish group, to be replaced by a luxury hotel.

When Mrs Chatel reveals the proposal to the campers, everyone forgets their quarrels and rallies around, united against the project. To this end, the campers invent a ploy to undo the work: they decide to try to convince the DRAC inspector that Gallo-Roman pottery is buried in the ground, and that the site is of archaeological importance. On the day of the inspection, Jean-Pierre claims to be the inspector during the mayor's visit. The real expert, meanwhile, is "hijacked" by Patrick and led through the neighboring nudist camp. The deception ends up being uncovered, the inspector visits the correct campsite, examines the excavated pottery and authenticates it as genuine. The archaeological site is proven, and so the redevelopment work will not take place.

The time comes for Patrick to leave and, having managed to seduce the lovely Pauline, they set out together for his home in Dijon. But she catches him looking at another girl at the tollbooth. She then leaves the car and Patrick returns home alone. As for Jean-Pierre, he reconciles with his fiancée and, with his daughter Lisa, the three leave for home.

== Cast ==
- Franck Dubosc as Patrick Chirac
- Richard Anconina as Jean-Pierre Savelli
- Mathilde Seigner as Sophie Gatineau
- Antoine Duléry as Paul Gatineau
- Claude Brasseur as Jacky Pic
- Mylène Demongeot as Laurette Pic
- Christine Citti as Madame Chatel
- Alysson Paradis as Sandra
- Vincent Moscato as Mario
- Julie de Bona as Pauline
- Lucia Sanchez as Madame Gandarias
- Laurent Olmedo as The 37
- Abbes Zahmani as Mendez
- Marco Bonini as Shamalack
- Enna Balland as Liza
- Charlie Barde as Aurélie Gatineau
- Benoît Simonpietri as Sébastien Gatineau
- Paco Cabezas as Lopez Carril
- Éric Naggar as The mayor
- Jean-Claude Bolle-Reddat as Couécou
- Peyo Lizarazu as Julien
- Marilyne Canto as Valérie
- Nicolas Gob as The policeman

== Sequel ==
A sequel titled Camping 3 was released in 2016.
