= Anne Marivin =

French actress (born 1974)

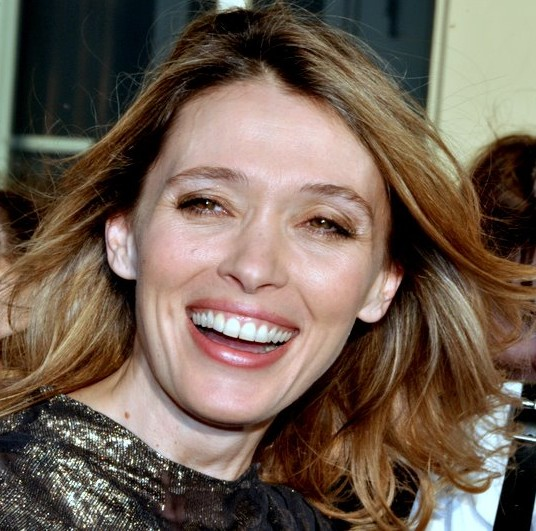
- Marivin in 2012
- Born: 23 January 1974 (age 52); Senlis, Oise, Picardy, France
- Occupation: Actress
- Years active: 1994–present
- Children: 2

Anne Marivin (born 23 January 1974) is a French actress. She has appeared in more than fifty film and television productions since 1994.

Marivin was noticed in television appearances such as Tel père, tel flic (2001) and Père et Maire (2002), and progressed from roles in television to cinema. She has appeared in films such as Ah ! si j'étais riche (2002), Mon Idole (2002), Chouchou (2003), Podium (2004), Narco (2004), A Ticket to Space (2006), and Bienvenue chez les Ch'tis (2008).

== Personal life ==
She was born in Senlis, Oise.

She is the partner of the designer Joachim Roncin. She gave birth to a boy Leonard with Roncin in April 2009. She gave birth to a daughter called Andrea fathered by Roncin on October 14, 2015.

== Filmography ==
Year	Title	Role	Director	Notes
1994	3000 scénarios contre un virus		Patrice Cazes	TV series (1 episode)
1995	Seconde B	Patricia	Christophe Gregeois	TV series (1 episode)
1998	La vieille barrière	A student	Lyèce Boukhitine	Short
1998	Pique nique	The girl	Hervé Bastien	Short
1998	Dossier: disparus	Patricia Rogez	Antoine Lorenzi	TV series (1 episode)
1998	Blague à part	Eva	François Greze	TV series (1 episode)
1999	1999 Madeleine		Laurent Bouhnik	
1999	Ouriga	Pauline	Antoine Plantevin	TV movie
1999	La kiné	Virginie Fabre	Aline Issermann	TV series (1 episode)
2000	J'peux pas dormir...	A friend	Guillaume Canet	Short
2001	De toute urgence	Isa	Philippe Triboit	TV movie
2001	Avocats & associés	Céline Rapière	Philippe Triboit (2)	TV series (1 episode)
2001	Tel père, telle flic	Marina	Eric Woreth	TV series (1 episode)
2002	Whatever You Say	The assistant	Guillaume Canet (2)	
2002	If I Were a Rich Man	The waitress	Gérard Bitton & Michel Munz	
2002	Si j'étais lui	Dany	Philippe Triboit (3)	TV movie
2002	Père et maire	Agathe Villard	Philippe Monnier	TV series (1 episode)
2003	Chouchou	The sellor	Merzak Allouache	
2004	Podium	Anne	Yann Moix	
2004	Narco	The objects woman	Tristan Aurouet & Gilles Lellouche	
2004	Navarro	Sonia	Patrick Jamain	TV series (1 episode)
2004	Sauveur Giordano	Ines 'Sophie' Berthault	Pierre Joassin	TV series (1 episode)
2005	Friday Wear	Lucy		TV series (1 episode)
2005	Fargas	Sophie	Didier Le Pêcheur & Didier Delaître	TV series (2 episodes)
2006	I Do	Sales Associate	Éric Lartigau	
2006	Un ticket pour l'espace	Female astronaut	Éric Lartigau (2)	
2006	Tell No One	Alex's secretary	Guillaume Canet (3)	
2006	Alice & Charlie	Alice	Stéphane Clavier & Julien Seri	TV series (2 episodes)
2007	Paris Lockdown	Laure	Frédéric Schoendoerffer	
2007	Pur week-end	Sarah	Olivier Doran	
2007	Santa Closed	The girl	Douglas Attal	Short
2008	Bienvenue chez les Ch'tis	Annabelle Deconninck	Dany Boon	
2008	The Easy Way	The cop	Jean-Paul Rouve	
2008	La clef du problème	Krista	Guillaume Cotillard	Short
2009	Incognito	Marion	Éric Lavaine	
2009	Tomorrow at Dawn	Jeanne	Denis Dercourt	
2009	Envoyés très spéciaux	Claire Monier	Frédéric Auburtin	
2009	Je vais te manquer	Lila	Amanda Sthers	
2009	Cinéman	Sidonie	Yann Moix (2)	
2009	Le siffleur	Zapetti Online	Philippe Lefebvre	
2009	Le coach	Vanessa Letissier	Olivier Doran (2)	
2009	Palizzi		Serge Hazanavicius	TV series (1 episode)
2010	Little White Lies	Juliette	Guillaume Canet (4)	
2010	Bacon on the Side	Justine Lacroix	Anne Depétrini	
2011	You Will Be My Son	Alice	Gilles Legrand	
2012	Il était une fois, une fois	Jessica / Cécile Morin	Christian Merret-Palmair	
2012	Crawl	Corinne	Hervé Lasgouttes	
2013	Le débarquement	Various	Renaud Le Van Kim	TV series (2 Episode)
2014	Among the Living	Julia	Julien Maury and Alexandre Bustillo	
2014	Respire		Mélanie Laurent	
2014	GHB: To Be or Not to Be	Casting girl	Laetitia Masson	
2014	SMS	Nathalie	Gabriel Julien-Laferrière	
2014	Ce soir je vais tuer l'assassin de mon fils	Sylvie Harfouche	Pierre Aknine	TV movie
2014	L'héritière	Ana Keller	Alain Tasma	TV movie
2014	WorkinGirls	Michèle Coignard	Sylvain Fusée	TV series (9 episodes)
2015	Le talent de mes amis	Carole Cortes	Alex Lutz	
2015	Tu es mon fils	Claire	Didier Le Pêcheur (2)	TV movie
2016	Les Beaux Malaises	Anne	Éric Lavaine (2)	TV mini-series
2017	This Is Our Land	Nathalie Leclerc	Lucas Belvaux	
2017	Raid dingue	The psychologist	Dany Boon (2)	
2017	L'embarras du choix		Éric Lavaine (3)	
2017	Le petit joueur		Éric Lavaine (4)	
2017	Baby Phone		Olivier Casas	
2018	Guy	Marie-France	Alex Lutz	
2024	Under Paris	The Mayor of Paris	Xavier Gens	
2026	Dix Pour Cent (movie)	Élise Formain	Émilie Noblet	
