= Deutsch-les-Landes =

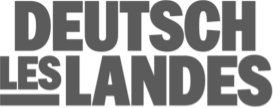
- Logo of the series broadcast on Prime Video in 2018
- French: Deutsch-les-Landes
- Genre: Comedy
- Created by: Alexandre Charlot; Franck Magnier; Thomas Rogel
- Written by: Alexandre Charlot; Franck Magnier; Peter Güde; Thomas Rogel; Camille Couasse; Marine Lachenaud
- Directed by: Denis Dercourt
- Starring: Marie-Anne Chazel; Christoph Maria Herbst; Roxane Duran; Sylvie Testud; Sebastian Schwarz; Jasmin Schwiers; Sophie Mounicot
- Countries of origin: France; Germany
- Original language: French
- No. of seasons: 1
- No. of episodes: 10

Production
- Producers: Alexandre Charlot; Franck Magnier; Peter Güde; Thomas Rogel; Yorick Kalbache; Moritz Polter; Sandra Ouaiss
- Production locations: Nouvelle-Aquitaine, France
- Running time: 26 minutes
- Production companies: Amazon Studios; Bavaria Fiction; Deutsche Telekom; Telfrance

Original release
- Network: Amazon Prime Video
- Release: 1 November 2018

Deutsch-les-Landes is a ten-part French-German comedy series.

== Plot ==
Martine, the mayor of Jiscalosse, a small village in the Landes, Nouvelle-Aquitaine, France, sells a part of the municipal lands to a German CEO, Gerhard Jäger, to avoid the bankruptcy of the municipality. The CEO then decides to relocate the whole of his firm to the village.

== Cast ==
- Marie-Anne Chazel: Martine
- Christoph Maria Herbst: Gerhard Jäger
- Roxane Duran: Chloé
- Sylvie Testud: Odile
- Sebastian Schwarz: Karsten
- Jasmin Schwiers: Marion
- Sophie Mounicot: Ghyslaine
- Philippe Lelièvre: Guillaume
- Éric Métayer: Jean-Michel
