= Maison de retraite 2 =

- Poster
- Directed by: Claude Zidi Jr.
- Written by: Élodie Hesme; Kev Adams; Thomas Gilou
- Produced by: Kev Adams; Raphaël Gribinski; Stan Wawrinka; Élisa Soussan
- Starring: Kev Adams; Jean Reno; Daniel Prévost; Liliane Rovère; Firmine Richard
- Cinematography: Thierry Pouget
- Edited by: Sandro Lavezzi
- Music by: Julien Cohen; Claude Morgan
- Release date: 14 February 2024 (France)
- Running time: 102 minutes
- Country: France
- Language: French

Maison de retraite 2 (lit. Retirement home 2) is a 2024 French comedy film directed by Claude Zidi Jr. It serves as a sequel to Maison de retraite (2022).

== Premise ==
The Lino Vartan Home for young orphans and elderly has to close for sanitary reasons. Milann Rousseau, manager of the facility, decides to accept an invitation from a retirement home in the South of France that proposes to host them for the summer. All the residents of the Lino Vartan Home are transferred by bus to the Bel Azur Club, which is set in an idyllic villa by the sea. But the persons who live there soon express their strong dislike for the newcomers.

The Bel Azur Club is managed by Claude Masson and his daughter, Clémence, is the main nurse. Milann and her gradually fall in love. For the sake of the budding couple, the two groups of residents decide to make peace. However, one of the children discovers that Claude is in league with a big EHPAD nursing home chain, Major Santé, with a bad reputation, and that the whole invitation was just a scheme. She cannot warn Milann in time: he has signed an agreement to have his protégés hosted by Masson, and, as a consequence, the elderly residents are all sent to one of Major Santé's nursing homes near Paris while the children are taken to an orphanage.

Milann is helped by Clémence, who was unaware of her father's intentions, and they trap Major Santé's COE, Reine Montrosier, by selling her an old mansion pretending it is a new top-notch facility that big investors are about to buy. With the money they receive they buy the villa on the sea where all the children and their elderly friends can now live.

== Cast ==
- Kev Adams: Milann Rousseau
- Jarry: Alban
- Brahim Bouhlel: Driss
- Stéphane Debac: Claude Masson
- Louna Espinosa: Clémence Masson
- Anne Marivin: Reine Montrosier
- Jean Reno: Lorenzo
- Daniel Prévost: Alfred de Gonzague
- Liliane Rovère: Sylvette Leroux
- Firmine Richard: Fleurette Jean-Marie
- Michel Jonasz: Albert
- Enrico Macias: Rico
- Amanda Lear: Barbara aka "Barbie"
- Chantal Ladesou: Danielle aka "La Colonelle"
- Marie-Christine Barrault: Madame Courtillet
- Marthe Villalonga: Claudine Valège

The film contains two short flashback scenes with Gérard Depardieu, consisting of footage from the first film.

== Production ==
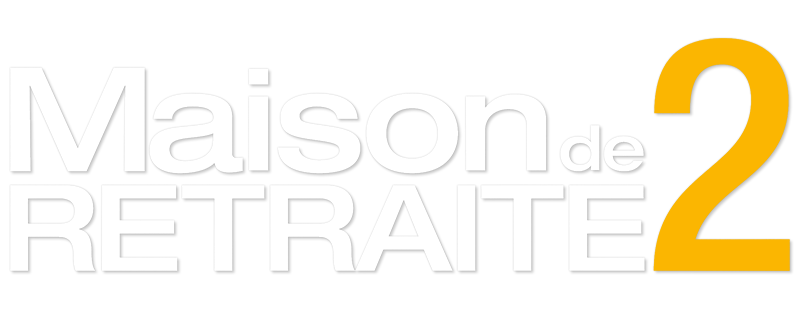
logo

Shooting started in April 2023 in Var at the Villa Rocabella located in Le Pradet.

== Reception ==
Reception was polarised, with various rather positive reviews in daily newspapers but mixed and negative ones in film and cultural magazines.

Telerama was very critical of the film. A review in Première praised the intention of a film seen as addressing the issues related to Ehpads and in particular the Orpea scandal (2015–2017), but found the production and acting repetitive; another review in the same magazine called the comedic scenes "regressive".

Le Temps sees in the film an example of the topical trend in French cinema focusing on the elderly, but found the film "appalling".
