= Angie Vu Ha =

Vietnamese model, DJ and influencer

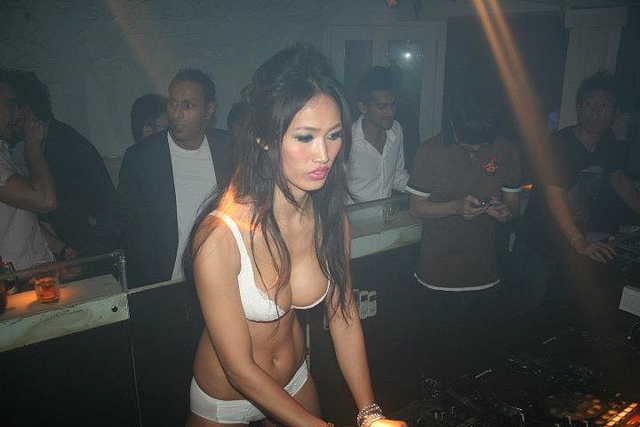
- Vu Ha in 2011
- Born: Vu Thi Ha; 1987 (age 38–39); Quảng Ninh
- Occupations: model, playmate, DJ, actor
- Years active: 2007–
- Children: 2 (one with first partner, one with Samuel Le Bihan)

Angie Vu Ha (born 1987) is a Vietnamese fashion model, DJ and influencer.

== Early life and education ==
Vu Ha was born in Quảng Ninh, Vietnam, the youngest child in a family of three children. She studied business administration and hotel administration at the National Economics University. She dropped out of school in 2006, forging her parents’ signature to go to Singapore to pursue a modelling career.

== Career ==
Vu Ha has been working as a model since the age of 17. She started an international modelling career in 2007. In 2012, she appeared on a reality TV show “Underwater Action”. She was offered a DJ job in Singapore at a local bar, beginning her career as a musical artist. She became a professional DJ in 2010. She had also appeared on America's Got Talent in 2015 and released musical albums in 2011 and 2012. Vu Ha is also the head of a modelling agency and has launched a lingerie line and has worked as a Playboy model.

As of 2018, Vu Ha was still modelling, appearing at an F1 event in Singapore, where she also continued her musical career.

She brands herself as “Asia's sexiest supermodel DJ”.

== Personal life ==
Vu Ha has a daughter with a French man. She has been in a relationship with French actor Samuel Le Bihan since 2016; the couple had a daughter in 2018.

== Legal Issues ==
Vu Ha was arrested in November 2015 at John F. Kennedy Airport in New York on parental kidnapping charges as she was about to board a flight to China with her 9-year-old daughter. She was facing extradition to France, where the child’s father lives. She was eventually extradited to Paris, where she was accused of not having returned her daughter to France after a vacation to the United States in 2015, then bringing the child to Vietnam. Both parents were separated, with the French courts having fixed the child’s primary residence with the father in France. She would spend six months in prison for the crime.
