= Bis (film) =

- Directed by: Dominique Farrugia
- Screenplay by: Nans Delgado; Dominique Farrugia; Frédéric Hazan
- Based on: an original idea by Matthieu Delaporte; Julien Rappeneau; Alexandre de La Patellière
- Produced by: Dominique Farrugia
- Starring: Kad Merad; Franck Dubosc
- Cinematography: Rémy Chevrin
- Edited by: Frédérique Olszak
- Music by: Julien Jaouen
- Production companies: Few; EuropaCorp; TF1 Films Production
- Distributed by: EuropaCorp Distribution
- Release dates: 14 January 2015 (L'Alpe d'Huez International Comedy Film Festival); 18 February 2015
- Running time: 98 minutes
- Country: France
- Language: French
- Budget: $14 million
- Box office: $10.8 million

Bis is a 2015 French comedy film directed by Dominique Farrugia. The film stars Kad Merad and Franck Dubosc.

== Plot ==
After an accident, two childhood friends are transported back to 1986.

== Cast ==
- Kad Merad as Patrice Olesky
- Franck Dubosc as Eric Drigeard
- Alexandra Lamy as Caroline
- Gérard Darmon as Eric's father
- Julien Boisselier as Patrice's father
- Anne Girouard as Eric's mother
- Eléonore Bernheim as Patrice's mother
- Antonin Chalon as Patrice (teenager)
- Fabian Wolfrom as Eric (teenager)
- Eden Ducourant as Caroline (teenager)
- Élodie Hesme as Anne
- Ariane Brodier as Sabrina
- Alix Bénézech as Sandrine
- Emeline Sannier as Chloé
