= People (film) =

2004 French comedy film

- Directed by: Fabien Onteniente
- Screenplay by: Fabien Onteniente
- Produced by: Éric and Nicolas Altmayer
- Starring: José Garcia; Rupert Everett; Ornella Muti; Élie Semoun; Rossy de Palma
- Cinematography: Josep M. Civit
- Edited by: Vincent Tabaillon
- Music by: Joachim Garraud; Bernard Grimaldi; David Guetta; Pascal Lemaire
- Production company: Mandarin Production
- Distributed by: SND Films
- Release date: 19 May 2004 (France)
- Running time: 84 minutes
- Countries: France; Spain
- Languages: French; Spanish; English; Italian
- Budget: $23 million
- Box office: $5.3 million

People is a 2004 French comedy film, directed by Fabien Onteniente. It's a sequel to Jet Set, released in 2000.

== Cast ==
- José Garcia : John John
- Rupert Everett : Charles de Poulignac
- Ornella Muti : Aphrodita
- Élie Semoun : Cyril Legall
- Rossy de Palma : Pilar
- Patrice Cols : Branco
- Bernard Farcy : B.B. Bellencourt
- Jean-Claude Brialy : Minimo
- Miglen Mirtchev : Toukhanov
- Marisa Berenson : Daniella
- Lambert Wilson : Brother Arthus
- Patrick Mille : Feelgood
- Philippe Laudenbach : Professor Chernot
- Chantal Ladesou : Jet-setter in rehab
