= Doorways =

- Doorways title card
- Genre: Science fiction
- Created by: George R. R. Martin
- Directed by: Peter Werner
- Starring: George Newbern; Anne Le Guernec; Robert Knepper; Kurtwood Smith; Carrie-Anne Moss; Max Grodenchik
- Composer: Phil Marshall
- Country of origin: United States

Production
- Production company: Columbia Pictures Television

Original release
- Network: ABC
- Release: April 21, 1993

Doorways is a proposed science fiction series from writer George R. R. Martin. The story is about people traveling through parallel universes to escape hunters working for aliens. A pilot was shot in May 1992, starring George Newbern, Anne Le Guernec, Robert Knepper, Kurtwood Smith, Hoyt Axton, Max Grodenchik, and Carrie-Anne Moss, but was not picked up, and the project was shelved.

In 2010, IDW Publishing developed an adaptation of the TV pilot into comic book format.

== Plot ==
A mysterious feral woman, known only as Cat (Anne Le Guernec), appears in the middle of a motorway, causing some cars to crash. She fires a weapon at a truck, which explodes, and she is injured by a fragment of the resulting shrapnel. She is taken to a hospital where she is cared for by Dr. Thomas Mason (George Newbern).

After he finishes work, Thomas visits his girlfriend Laura (Carrie-Anne Moss), with whom he discusses his mysterious new patient. Meanwhile, three dark-clad beings and a floating podium (containing a Dark Lord) appear on the motorway at the same location where Cat appeared.

The next day Thomas discovers Cat has been removed from the hospital and is confronted by FBI Special Agent Trager (Kurtwood Smith), who escorts him to a secret underground lab and holding facility. There, Dr. Roth (Max Grodénchik) explains to Thomas that Cat's weapon (the "phut BOOM" gun) and her bracelet (the "geosyncronator") have an unusual mixture of organic and technological properties, and do not appear to have been designed for human hands. Thomas is taken to Cat, who is being detained; and he gives her back her bracelet, which allows one of the dark-clad beings, Thane (Robert Knepper) to track her.

Cat escapes the holding facility with Thomas' help, and together the two drive towards a "door" that leads to a parallel universe that is safer for her. Cat explains that Thane is chasing her and that, unless they reach the door before it closes, she will be trapped and killed by Thane.

The two reach the "door" and are confronted by Thane, who kills Trager and several FBI agents who were also tracking them. They manage to escape through the "door", just before Thane can catch them, and end up in a world where, 15 years ago, a microbe gene was created to clean up an oil spill, but it ate all petroleum in the world. They hitch a ride on a wagon with Jake (Hoyt Axton) and his granddaughter Cissy (Tisha Putman), who give them a ride to the nearest truck stop. While at the truck-stop, Cat detects that her pursuers have materialized in this world also and tries to steal Jake and Cissy's horses to escape from them. Cat and Thomas are arrested by this world's version of Agent Trager and are held overnight to be escorted to jail in the morning.

The following day as Thomas and Cat are being escorted to jail by Trager, they hear Jake and Cissy's wagon being attacked by a bike gang, Cat rescues Cissy, but Jake is shot by the bike gang. Thomas stabilizes Jake, and arranges with Trager to get Jake transported to a hospital in Denver. In Denver, Cat locates their next "door", but they are blocked by Thane and his colleagues, until Trager (once again) sacrifices himself to allow the two to escape to a new adventure.

== Cast and characters ==
- George Newbern as Dr. Thomas Mason, a medical doctor who is adept at magic since his father was a stage magician, and at the start of the show serves as an ER doctor. He has a girlfriend, Laura (who is a lawyer) and is very content with his life until everything is changed completely when he meets Cat. She brings him with her through a 'Door' to a parallel world where things are similar, but different, to our world.
- Anne Le Guernec as Cat, former servant of Thane, and the Dark Lord. Cat is a fugitive from a parallel Earth ruled by aliens, who lands on this Earth and is quickly injured. She is taken to hospital where she meets Thomas, but is taken from there to an FBI holding site, where she is rescued by Thomas. The pair hitch-hike to the nearest 'Door' to another parallel world, and escape to an Earth where petrol has disappeared.
- Robert Knepper as Thane, servant of the Dark Lord. Thane is from this same parallel Earth as Cat, that is ruled by aliens, and he is a servant to one of these aliens ("the Dark Lord"), and was the owner of Cat. He does not consider himself human, rather a hunter of humans. He has several bio-enhancements, including a set of claws that emerge from the back of his hands.
- Kurtwood Smith as Special Agent Trager, who investigates Cat's appearance.
- Carrie-Anne Moss as Laura, a lawyer who is Thomas' girlfriend.
- Max Grodénchik as Dr. Roth, an FBI researcher who investigates Cat's equipment.
- Hoyt Axton as Jake, a friendly wanderer in a parallel world.
- Tisha Putman as Cissy, Jake's granddaughter.

== Production ==
=== Development ===
George R. R. Martin pitched the concept for Doorways in 1991 to various television networks, and ABC agreed to pick up the show. The pilot was produced with Columbia Pictures. Martin spent much of 1991 redrafting and polishing the pilot script. This process continued until, in January 1992, production was given the green light. Anne Le Guernec was cast as Cat, but the actor that the production company wanted for Thomas, George Newbern, was in the middle of shooting a movie. After several hundred more auditions, it was decided to defer the shooting of the pilot until Newbern became free in May 1992.

The series was originally called Doors (the portals that Tom and Cat travel through are always called Doors rather than Doorways), but this was changed after ABC expressed concern that it may be confused with either the rock band The Doors or the Oliver Stone biopic The Doors.

In August 1992, a rough cut of the show was shown to ABC executives, who reacted enthusiastically and ordered six additional scripts for the show. Martin worked on those scripts for the next six months with Michael Cassutt, Ed Zuckerman, Steve De Jarnatt, and J. D. Feigelson. In May 1993, ABC announced that they would not be picking up Doorways.

=== Connection to Sliders ===
There has been speculation that Sliders was inspired by Doorways, in which the main cast also were fugitives fleeing through parallel worlds, while carrying a device that tells them where and when the next Doorway opens. At the time of Sliders' launch, Evelyn C. Leeper noted the similarities to Doorways. In response to rumors that Sliders creator Tracy Tormé applied for a writing position on the show, Martin clarified in a 1995 post on GEnie that it was Tormé's agent that inquired about the position, and Tormé has denied any connection between the two.

== In other media ==
=== Book ===
The first draft of the pilot script appeared in George R. R. Martin's 1200 page GRRM: A RRetrospective in 2003, which was republished in 2006 as Dreamsongs: A RRetrospective.

=== Comic book adaptation ===
Artist Stefano Martino did not view the TV pilot before drawing the comic.

On August 30, 2010, IDW Publishing announced its forthcoming adaptation of Doorways was to be in four parts. When speaking of the parallel worlds, editor Mariah Huehner says "One of the most interesting is a world with no oil. Which is pretty timely." Explaining the plot, she says:

It's a dark sci-fi/fantasy, that's not unlike the Twilight Zone in terms of taking an ordinary person and suddenly confronting them with very bizarre events and people. Tom is a total "good" guy, loves his girlfriend, likes his job, and just wants to help people. But when Cat shows up she turns his comfortable world upside down.

Martin noted in the first issue of Doorways that artist Stefano Martino has not seen the pilot, and the visual representations of the characters and architecture are totally changed. He goes on to say that in the medium of comics without the constraints of budget there is more creative freedom. Martin says that the comic version "is much cooler than the television show could ever have been."

Issue #1 was released in November 2010. All four issues were collected as a hardcover in July 2011.
