= Poltergay =

- Film poster
- Directed by: Éric Lavaine
- Screenplay by: Héctor Cabello Reyes; Éric Lavaine
- Based on: an original idea by Héctor Cabello Reyes
- Produced by: François Cornuau; Vincent Roget; Fabio Conversi
- Starring: Clovis Cornillac; Julie Depardieu
- Cinematography: Vincent Mathias
- Edited by: Vincent Zuffranieri
- Music by: Moto; The Supermen Lovers
- Production company: Same Player
- Distributed by: TFM Distribution
- Release date: 25 October 2006
- Running time: 93 minutes
- Country: France
- Language: French
- Budget: €7.2 million
- Box office: $3.7 million

Poltergay is a 2006 French film directed by Éric Lavaine and based on an idea by Héctor Cabello Reyes. The script was written by Héctor Cabello Reyes and Éric Lavaine. The film was released on 25 October 2006.

== Plot ==
Emma and Marc, two young lovers, move into a house which has been uninhabited for thirty years. They do not know is that in 1979, in a cave under the house, there was a gay disco, which burned down when a foam machine short-circuited, and five bodies were never found. Today, the house is haunted by five gay ghosts. However, only Marc is able to see them, and his visions drive Emma away. The ghosts, touched by Marc's problems, do everything in their power to help him get his girl back.

== Cast ==
- Clovis Cornillac as Marc
- Julie Depardieu as Emma
- Lionel Abelanski as Salopette
- Michel Duchaussoy as De Sorgue
- Philippe Duquesne as Michel
- Alain Fromager as David
- Georges Gay as Ivan
- Gilles Gaston-Dreyfus as Bertrand
- Jean-Michel Lahmi as Gilles
- Héctor Cabello Reyes as Psychiatrist

== Reception ==
On review aggregator Rotten Tomatoes, the film holds an approval rating of 60% based on 5 reviews, with an average rating of 4.5/10.
