= Disco (2008 film) =

- Film poster
- Directed by: Fabien Onteniente
- Written by: Emmanuel Booz; Franck Dubosc; Philippe Guillard; Fabien Onteniente
- Starring: Franck Dubosc; Emmanuelle Béart; Gérard Depardieu; Samuel Le Bihan
- Cinematography: Jean-Marie Dreujou
- Edited by: Nathalie Langlade; Laurent Rouan; Sarah Ternat
- Music by: Michel Legrand
- Distributed by: StudioCanal
- Release date: 2 April 2008
- Running time: 103 minutes
- Country: France
- Language: French
- Budget: $22.4 million
- Box office: $23.5 million

Disco is a 2008 French comedy film directed by Fabien Onteniente, which was released on 2 April 2008, with Franck Dubosc as "Didier Travolta" in the main role, alongside Emmanuelle Béart, Gérard Depardieu and Samuel Le Bihan.

The main subject of this movie is the rebirth of disco music at the mid-2000s in a town of France. The film is at first humorous, with a lot of clichés about Saturday Night Fever, but it doesn't disparage the disco culture at any time. In fact, all the people involved in this film are fans of disco, dance and funk music.

The soundtrack to the film contains a cover version of the Bee Gees' "Night Fever" performed by Australian singer and songwriter Tina Arena.

== Cast ==
- Franck Dubosc as Didier Graindorge a.k.a. Travolta
- Emmanuelle Béart as France Navarre
- Gérard Depardieu as Jean-François Civette a.k.a. Jean-François Jackson
- Samuel Le Bihan as Walter
- Abbes Zahmani as Neuneuil
- Annie Cordy as Madame Graindorge
- Isabelle Nanty as The Baroness
- François-Xavier Demaison as Guillaume Navarre
- Christine Citti as Coco
- Chloé Lambert as Cerise
- Danièle Lebrun as Mother Navarre
- Jacques Sereys as Father Navarre
- Jérôme Le Banner as Rodolphe
- Marie-Christine Adam as The hiring manager
- Chantal Banlier as Madame Sochard
- Christine Paolini as Madame Prunelli
