= Patrick Pelloux =

French physician and activist (b. 1963)

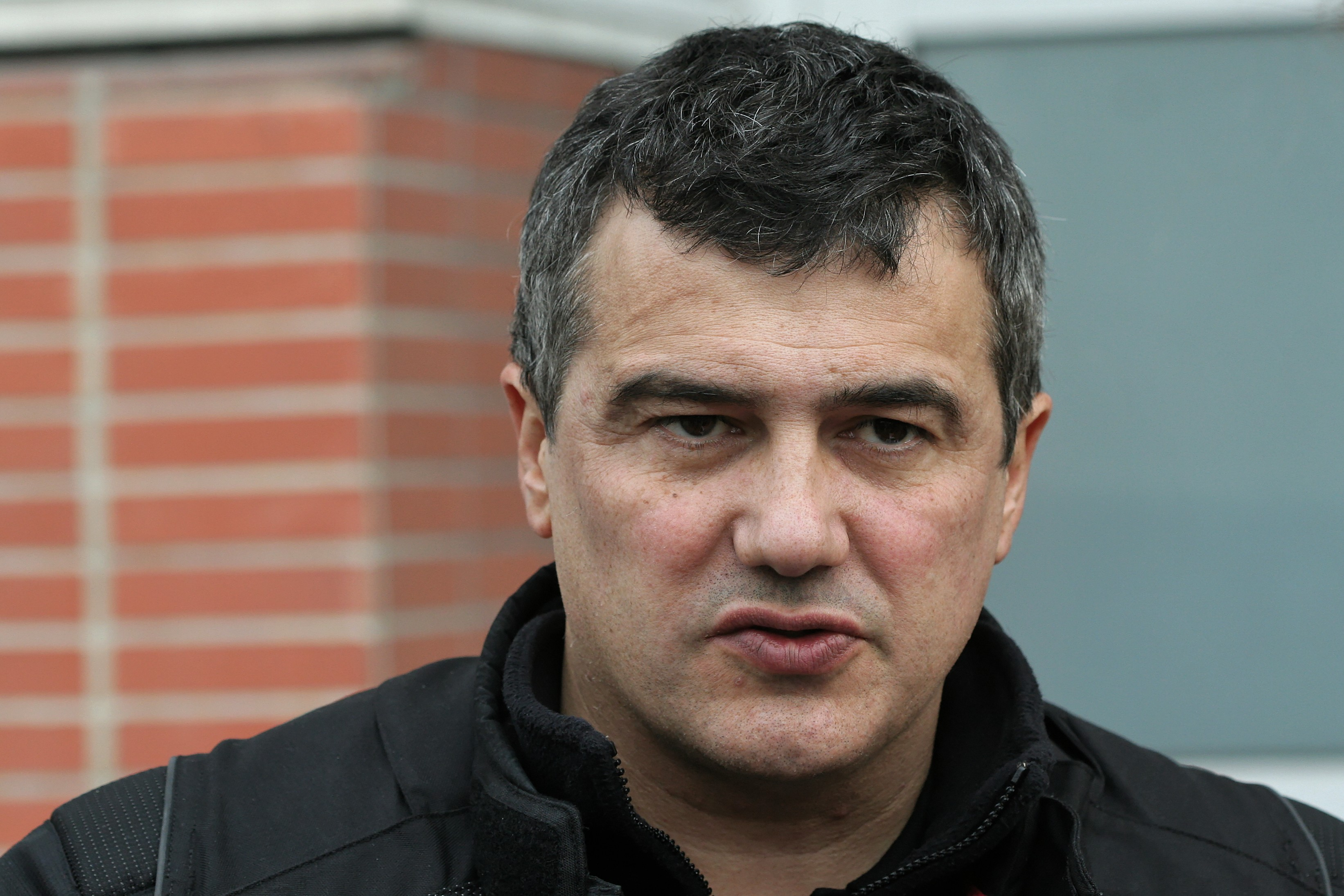
Pelloux in 2011 in front of arsonned Charlie Hebdo headquarters

Patrick Pelloux (born 19 August 1963 in Villeneuve-Saint-Georges, Val-de-Marne) is a French physician and activist. He is a specialist of emergency medical services.

== Biography ==
Patrick Pelloux became well known in France during the 2003 European heat wave, as he was the first to point out that thousands of people were dying, though the French authorities denied it.

Since 2004, he has written articles in Charlie Hebdo, a satirical newspaper, on the work of an emergency physician.

Since 2008, he has been chairman of Association des médecins urgentistes de France (a French trade union for emergency physicians). He is opposed to bullfighting.

During the Charlie Hebdo shooting, on 7 January 2015, he was near the magazine's building, so he was one of the first people on the spot after the shooting, having been called by someone who worked for the magazine. He immediately phoned French President François Hollande to tell him what had happened. He saw that some of his friends were dead and provided first aid to the others.

== Filmography ==
- 2009 : Incognito, directed by Éric Lavaine
- 2012 : Bad Girl, directed by Patrick Mille

== Bibliography ==
- Megghan Keneally (Jan 8, 2015). "Doctor Gets Choked Up While Talking About Charlie Hebdo Attack". ABC News.
- ""Je n'ai pas pu les sauver": le témoignage poignant de Patrick Pelloux" (in French). Libération, via AFP.
- "Les histoires du docteur Pelloux dans " Charlie "". Le Monde (in French). 2005-01-01.
