= Camping 3 =

- Theatrical release poster
- Directed by: Fabien Onteniente
- Written by: Franck Dubosc; Fabien Onteniente
- Produced by: Jérôme Seydoux; Patrick Godeau; Vivien Aslanian; Romain Le Grand; Ardavan Safaee; Serge Hayat
- Starring: Franck Dubosc; Antoine Duléry; Claude Brasseur; Mylène Demongeot; Gérard Jugnot; Michèle Laroque
- Cinematography: Pierric Gantelmi d'Ille
- Edited by: Elisa Aboulker; Bruno Safar
- Music by: Jean Yves d'Angelo; Maxime Desprez; Michael Tordjman
- Production companies: Pathé; TF1 Films Production; Waiting For Cinema; Versus Production
- Distributed by: Pathé
- Release date: 29 June 2016
- Running time: 105 minutes
- Country: France
- Language: French
- Budget: $16.9 million
- Box office: $24.2 million

Camping 3 is a 2016 French comedy film directed by Fabien Onteniente. It is a sequel to the 2010 film Camping 2. The film was a box office success, having grossed US$24.2 million in France, becoming the second highest-grossing domestic film in 2016, with 3,228,313 tickets sold. It is the third installment in the Camping film series.

== Plot ==
In the summer, the Camping Flots Bleus (Blue Waves Campground) again await holidaying friends: The Pic, Jacky and Laurette, Gatineau, just-divorced Sophia, 37, and Patrick Chirac. This year, Patrick decides to try carpooling. Thinking about traveling across France with Vanessa, he is left with three young Dijon guys: Robert the charmer, Benji the hunk, and José the loudmouth. At the campground, Patrick is forced to test out his new co-sleeping arrangement.

== Cast ==
- Franck Dubosc as Patrick Chirac
- Antoine Duléry as Paul Gatineau
- Claude Brasseur as Jacky Pic
- Mylène Demongeot as Laurette Pic
- Gérard Jugnot as Charmillard
- Michèle Laroque as Anne So
- Sophie Mounicot as Sabrina
- Cristiana Reali as Clotilde
- Louka Meliava as Benji
- Jules Ritmanic as José
- Cyril Mendy as Robert
- Philippe Lellouche as Carello
- Laurent Olmedo as The 37
- Leslie Medina as Morgane
- Amélie Robin as Charlotte
- Eden Ducourant as Aurélie
- Alix Bénézech as Manon
- Clara Antoons as Linda
- Honorine Magnier as Mélanie
- Victoria Olloqui as Valérie
- Yvick Letexier as Kevin
- Aymeric Dapsence as SJ Shogun
- Dominique Prudent as Bressan
- Michel Crémadès as Moustachu
- Yves De Jonghe as Mr. Van de Kerkoff
- Guilaine Londez as The waitress
