= Françoise Seigner =

French actress (1928–2008)

Françoise Seigner (7 April 1928 – 13 October 2008) was a French actress. She is best known for her theatre work, but also acted in a few movies, such as The Wild Child (1970) and the 2005 adaptation of the Agatha Christie novel By the Pricking of My Thumbs (2005). She was the aunt of actresses Emmanuelle and Mathilde Seigner.

Seigner died of pancreatic cancer.

== Filmography ==
Year	Title	Role	Notes
1965	Les pieds dans le plâtre	Mme Bolozon	
1970	The Wild Child	Madame Guerin	
1982	Les Misérables	La Thénardier	
1983	Le jeune marié	Billy's mother	
2005	By the Pricking of My Thumbs	Tante Ada Beresford	(final film role)
