= Pierre Bénichou =

French journalist (1938–2020)

Pierre Bénichou Commandeur
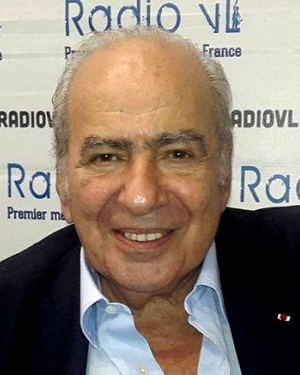
- Born: 1 March 1938; Oran, French Algeria
- Died: 31 March 2020 (aged 82); Paris, France
- Other names: Beau Pedro, roi du tango Tonton Merguez; La Béniche; Bob du grand huit Le Président; Le Rossignol d'Oran; La Josephine Baker du Maghreb; Plus beau bébé d'Oran
- Occupations: Journalist, Columnist
- Spouse: Alix Dufaure
- Parent: André Bénichou
- Relatives: Paul Bénichou (paternal uncle); Vincent Lindon (stepson)

Pierre Bénichou, Commandeur, (1 March 1938 – 31 March 2020) was a French journalist.

== Early life ==
Pierre Bénichou was born on 1 March 1938 in Oran, French Algeria. His father, André Bénichou, a philosophy professor, opened a private school after he was dismissed from his job for being Jewish in 1941, in the midst of World War II. One of his father's pupils was author Albert Camus. His paternal uncle, Paul Bénichou, was a historian. His paternal grandparents were practising Jews. He moved to Paris, France, in 1949.

== Career ==
Bénichou was a journalist. He started his career as an intern for France Soir. He joined France Dimanche in 1956. He became a reporter for Jours de France in 1961. He became the editor-in-chief of Le Nouvel Observateur, another magazine, in 1966, at a time when it was the most sold weekly newspaper in Europe He subsequently joined Les Grosses Têtes, a cult radio programme on RTL that made him a staple name in France for decades. He was also a contributor to Vivement Dimanche, a television programme hosted by Michel Drucker. A much loved figure, he was widely considered as a "monument historique" of French Media.

Bénichou became a Commander of the Legion of Honour on 25 March 2016.

== Personal life ==
Bénichou was married to Alix Dufaure, journalist for Marie Claire; she died May 2, 2012. They had one son together, Antoine. Actor Vincent Lindon and his brother Sylvain are his stepson; Dufaure divorced Laurent Lindon in 1964.
