= Toc toc =

Toc toc may refer to:

- Toc-Toc (album), 2026 album by Ed Motta
- Toc Toc, 2017 Spanish film
- Toc toc boat, a type of toy

== See also ==
- Toc toc toc, French TV series
- Tick tock (disambiguation)
