= If I Were a Rich Man (film) =

- Theatrical release poster
- Directed by: Gérard Bitton; Michel Munz
- Written by: Gérard Bitton; Michel Munz
- Produced by: Charles Gassot; Dominique Brunner (executive producer)
- Starring: Jean-Pierre Darroussin; Valeria Bruni Tedeschi; Richard Berry; François Morel; Noémie Lvovsky
- Cinematography: Chicca Ungaro
- Edited by: Marie Castro-Vasquez
- Music by: Michel Munz
- Distributed by: UGC Fox Distribution
- Release date: 27 November 2002
- Running time: 100 min.
- Country: France
- Language: French
- Budget: $2.6 million
- Box office: $5.6 million

If I Were a Rich Man (Ah! Si j'étais riche) is a 2002 French film written and directed by Gérard Bitton and Michel Munz.

== Plot ==
Aldo Bonnard (played by Jean-Pierre Darroussin) is about to divorce his wife Alice (Valeria Bruni Tedeschi) while his new boss, Gérard (Richard Berry), is a hypocritical man. Worse, he discovers that his wife has an affair with his boss. But one day, he wins a lottery of 10 million euros. He decides to leave his job and not to reveal the news to his wife until the day of the divorce.

== Principal cast ==
- Jean-Pierre Darroussin : Aldo Bonnard
- Valeria Bruni-Tedeschi : Alice
- Richard Berry : Gérard
- François Morel : Jean-Phil
- Helena Noguerra : Priscille
- Tony Gaultier : Morillon
- Zinedine Soualem : Kader Benhassine
- Noémie Lvovsky : Claire
- Philippe Duquesne : Bergeron
- Sophie Mounicot : Madame Gabai
- Didier Flamand : Monsieur Agenor
- Aurélie Boquien : Madame Benhassine
- Darry Cowl : Sylvain
- Frédéric Bouraly : Elvis
- Jean Dujardin : Le vendeur Weston
- Anne Marivin : The waitress

== Remake ==
The film inspired a Spanish remake, Si Yo Fuera Rico, which was released in November 2019.
