= Olivier Courson =

French film producer (born 1965)

Olivier Courson (born 1965) is a French film producer. Until 2015, he was the chairman & CEO (Executive) of production and distribution company StudioCanal.

== Filmography ==
- Inside Llewyn Davis (2013) – executive producer
- I Give It a Year (2013) – executive producer
- Love, Marilyn (documentary) (2012) – executive producer
- Deadfall (2012) – executive producer
- The Awakening (2011) – executive producer
- Tinker Tailor Soldier Spy (2011) – executive producer
- Attack the Block (2011) – executive producer
- Unknown (2011) – co-producer
- The Tourist (2010) – executive producer
- Brighton Rock (2010) – executive producer
- Chloe (2009) – executive producer
