= Ariane Brodier =

French journalist and presenter

- Born: 26 April 1979 (age 47); France
- Occupations: Actress, TV host
- Years active: 2002 - present

Ariane Brodier (born 26 April 1979) is a French television personality, actress, TV host and humorist.

== Early life ==
Sha was born the April 26, 1979 at Lagny-sur-Marne.

== Life and career ==
After being an animator on the series "Opération séduction aux Caraïbes" (an adaptation of the Harem TV show), Ariane was a columnist on a talk show hosted by Elsa Fayer on Fun TV. She then began co-presenting a new edition of "Morning Live" on Fun TV with Cyril Hanouna.

After a meteorology course, she became a weather girl on M6. During this time, Ariane also hosted these programs:

- M6 Music Black (hip-hop, R&B, + interviews)
- LGK (teens program) on NT1
- Nature documentary on NT1

For 2 years, Ariane had been hosting two music programs on M6:

- The Alternative (pop, rock, trip-ho, électro, rap)
- CLUB (best of club music videos)

Ariane also presented a program "One Day With", where in each episode she spent a day in the life of a singer.

On 2 August 2008, Ariane left M6 Channel. In September, she joined France 2 where she works as a columnist in Julien Courbet's program "Service Maximum". On August 30, 2014, Ariane competed on the television show Fort Boyard.

In January 2018, she gave birth to a son by her boyfriend, rugby player Fulgence Ouedraogo. On April 25, 2019, she gave birth to another baby with the same boyfriend.

== Filmography ==
| Year | Title | Role | Director | Notes |
|---|---|---|---|---|
| 2009 | La loi de Murphy | The nurse | Christophe Campos | |
| 2010 | Interview | Marie-Ange Desjeux | Stephen Mitchell | TV series (1 episode) |
| 2011 | Colombiana | Alexa | Olivier Megaton | |
| 2012 | Superstar | Marion | Xavier Giannoli | |
| 2012 | On se quitte plus | Shirley | Laurence Katrian | TV movie |
| 2012 | Le jour où tout a basculé | Magalie | Thierry Esteves Pinto | TV series (1 episode) |
| 2012 | Section de recherches | Natacha | Delphine Lemoine | TV series (1 episode) |
| 2013 | 4 jeunes, 1 voiture | Ariane | Abel Ferry | TV series (1 episode) |
| 2015 | Bis | Sabrina | Dominique Farrugia | |
| 2015 | Le héros | | Liam Engle & Akim Omiri | Short |
| 2016 | Un monde sans chiffre | | Flober & Akim Omiri (2) | Short |
| 2017 | Chronologia Human | Ariane | Erik Blanc | |
