= Valérie Guignabodet =

French film director

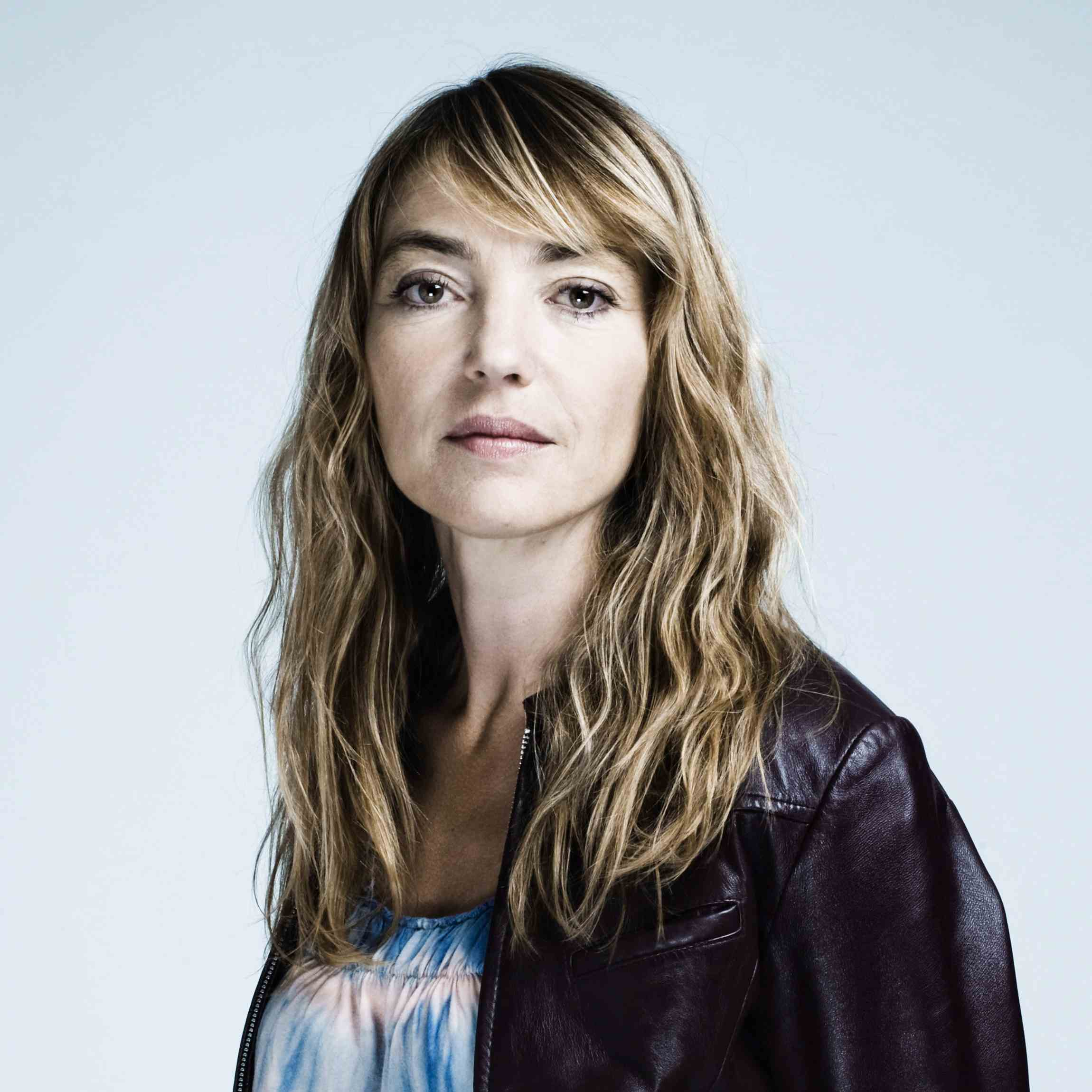
- Valérie Guignabodet in 2009
- Born: 9 May 1965; Paris, France
- Died: 23 February 2016 (aged 50); Saint-Andiol, France
- Education: Emlyon Business School
- Occupations: Director, screenwriter
- Years active: 2002–2016

Valérie Guignabodet (9 May 1965 – 23 February 2016) was a French film director and screenwriter. She studied at Emlyon Business School, and directed four films between 2002 and 2009, including Danse avec lui in 2007, and the television series Sam in 2016.
