= Éric Lavaine =

French film director and screenwriter (born 1966)

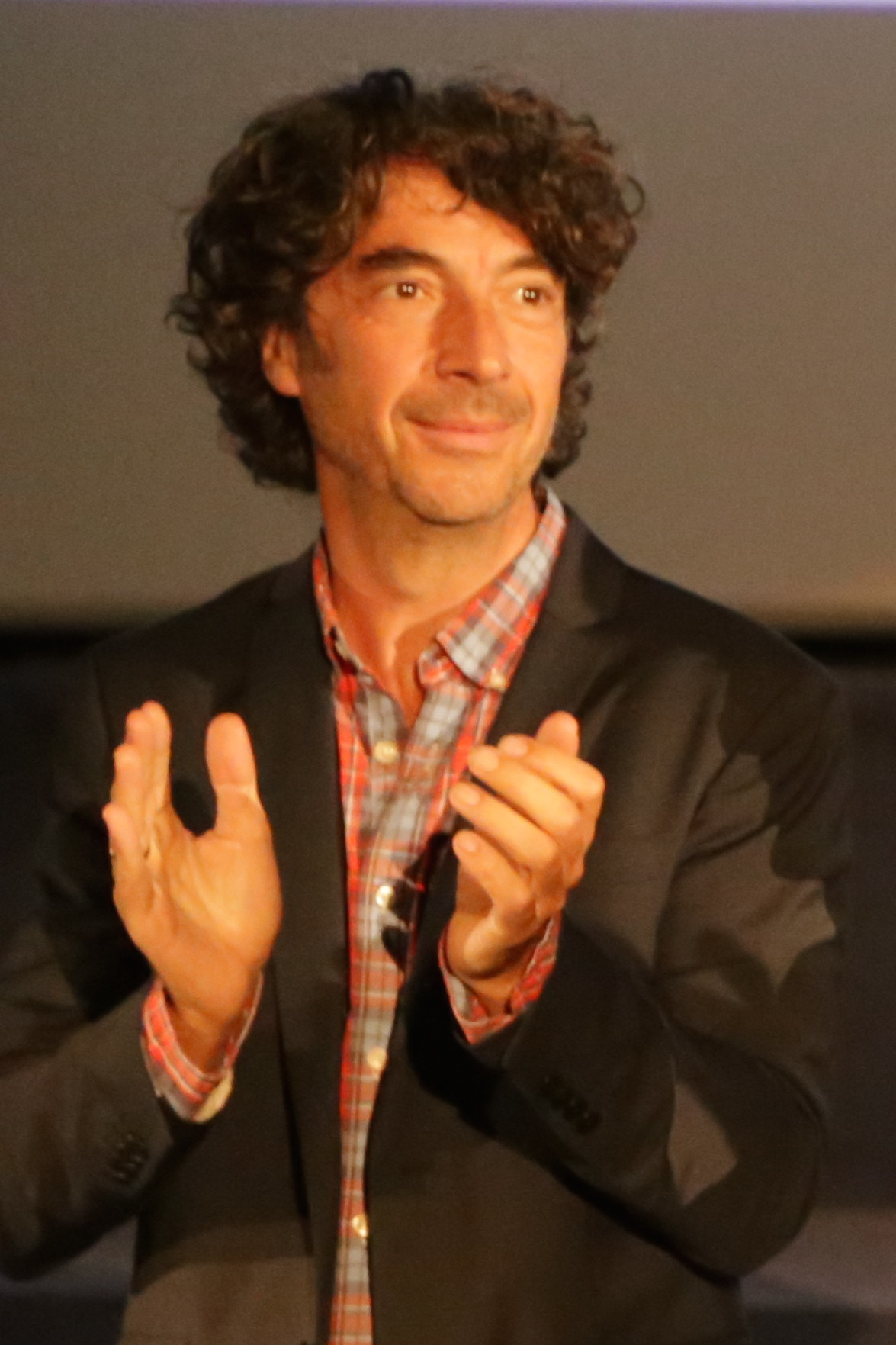
- Lavaine in 2014
- Born: 1966 (age 59–60); Paris, France
- Occupations: Film director, screenwriter
- Years active: 1998–present

Éric Lavaine (born 1966) is a French film director and screenwriter.

== Filmography ==
Year	Title	Role	Box office	Notes
1998–2002	H	Writer & Art Director		TV series (59 episodes)
2002	Le 17	Director		TV series (1 episode)
2002	Faut-il ?	Writer		TV series (2 episodes)
2006	Poltergay	Director & writer	$4.1 million	
2009	Incognito	Director & writer	$10.5 million	
2010	Protéger & servir	Director & writer	$7 million	
2011	Bienvenue à bord	Director & writer	$12.8 million	
2014	Barbecue	Director & writer	$13.9 million	
2014	Le voyage de monsieur Perrichon	Director & writer		TV movie
2016	Back to Mom's	Director & writer	$17.5 million	
2016	Les Beaux Malaises	Director & writer		TV series (1 episode)
2017	L'embarras du choix	Director & writer	$3.1 million	
2021	Un tour chez ma fille	Director & writer	$3.1 million	
