= Fabien Onteniente =

French film director and screenwriter (born 1958)

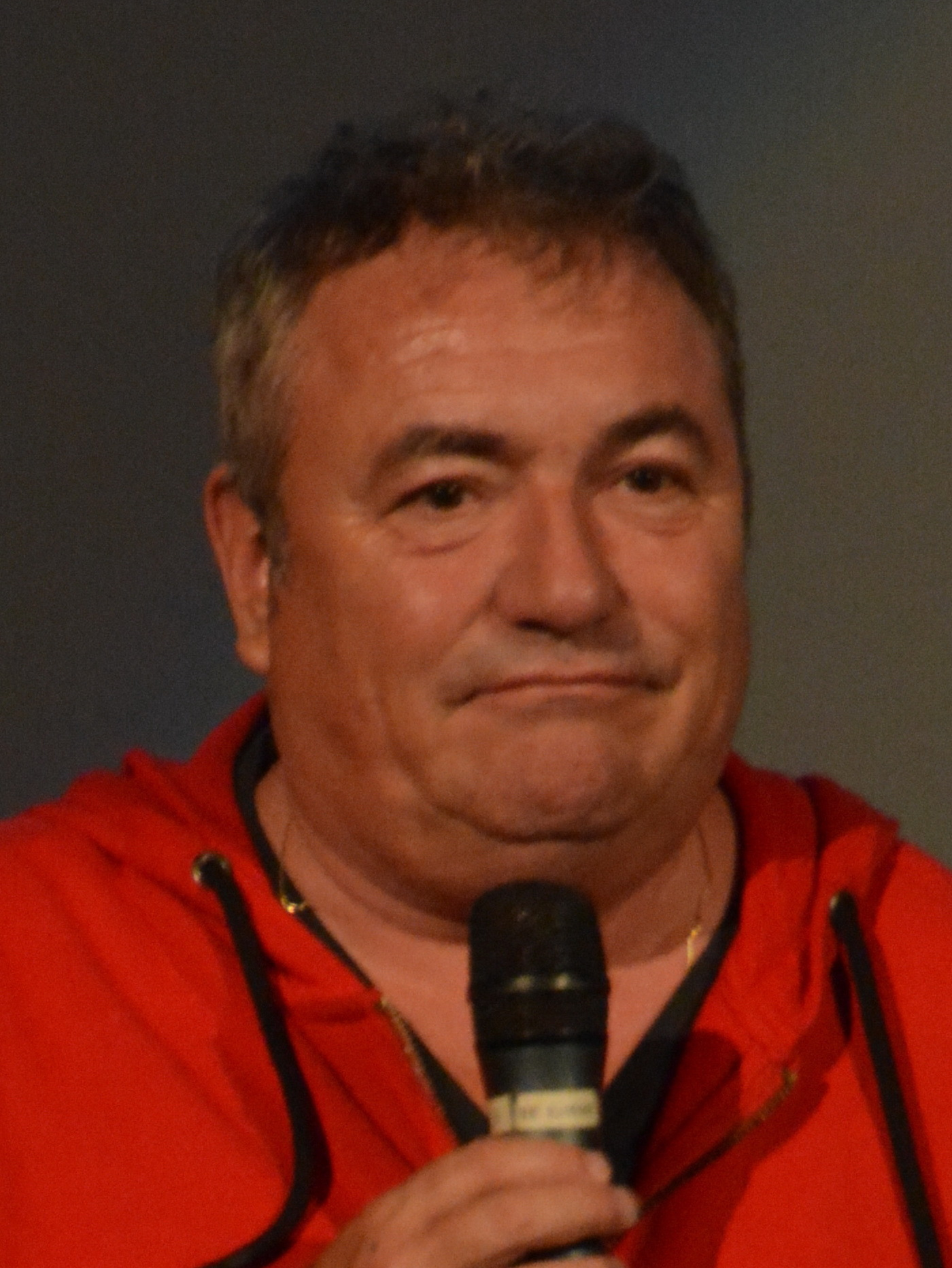
- Born: 27 April 1958 (age 68); Paris, France
- Occupations: Film director, screenwriter, actor

Fabien Onteniente (born 27 April 1958) is a French film director and screenwriter.

== Filmography ==
- 1989 : Bobby et l'aspirateur (short film)
- 1992 : À la vitesse d'un cheval au galop
- 1995 : Tom est tout seul
- 1996 : Le Tuteur (TV)
- 1998 : Grève party
- 2000 : Jet Set
- 2001 : Tel épris (TV)
- 2002 : 3 zéros
- 2004 : People
- 2006 : Camping
- 2008 : Disco
- 2010 : Camping 2
- 2013 : Turf
- 2016 : Camping 3
- 2019 : All Inclusive
- 2020 : 100% Bio (TV)
