= List of French films of 2006 =

A list of films released in France in 2006.

Title	Director	Cast	Genre	Notes
13 Tzameti	Géla Babluani	Pascal Bongard	Thriller	Jury Prize (Sundance)
Arthur and the Invisibles	Luc Besson	Freddie Highmore, Mia Farrow	Drama	
Azur & Asmar: The Princes' Quest	Michel Ocelot	Cyril Mourali, Karim M'Riba, Hiam Abbass	Animation / Fantasy	
Barakat!	Djamila Sahraoui	Rachida Brakni	Drama	Oumarou Ganda Prize (FESPACO)
Bed & Breakfast	Martin Beilby, Loïc Moreau	Ellen Feiss, Brian Quinn, Ruaidhri Conroy	Drama	
Bled Number One	Rabah Ameur-Zaïmeche	Meryem Serbah		Screened at the 2006 Cannes Film Festival
Charlie Says	Nicole Garcia	Jean-Pierre Bacri, Vincent Lindon	Drama	Entered into the 2006 Cannes Film Festival
Days of Glory	Rachid Bouchareb	Jamel Debbouze, Sami Bouajila	War drama	Entered into the 2006 Cannes Film Festival
Flanders	Bruno Dumont	Adélaïde Leroux	Drama	Won the Grand Prix at Cannes
French Fried Vacation 3	Patrice Leconte	Christian Clavier, Josiane Balasko	Comedy	
Lights in the Dusk	Aki Kaurismäki	Janne Hyytiäinen, Ilkka Koivula, Maria Järvenhelmi	Comedy-drama	Finnish-German-French co-production
Little Jerusalem	Karin Albou	Fanny Valette	Drama	2 wins & 3 nominations
Michou d'Auber	Thomas Gilou	Gérard Depardieu, Nathalie Baye	Drama	Set in 1960.
Murderers	Patrick Grandperret	Hande Kodja	Drama	Screened at the 2006 Cannes Film Festival
Oh La La!	Anne Fontaine	Danielle Darrieux	Comedy drama	Screened at the 2006 Cannes Film Festival
OSS 117: Cairo, Nest of Spies	Michel Hazanavicius	Jean Dujardin	Adventure comedy	2 wins & 4 nominations
The Page Turner	Denis Dercourt	Catherine Frot, Déborah François	Drama	3 nominations
Perfume: The Story of a Murderer	Tom Tykwer	Ben Whishaw, Alan Rickman, Rachel Hurd-Wood, Dustin Hoffman	Period psychological thriller	German-French-Spanish-American-Belgian co-production
Priceless	Pierre Salvadori	Audrey Tautou, Gad Elmaleh	Comedy	
Renaissance	Christian Volckman		Animation / Action	1 win
Sheitan	Kim Chapiron	Vincent Cassel	Horror / Black comedy	
Stolen Holidays (Les Petites vacances)	Olivier Peyon		Drama	
Tell No One	Guillaume Canet	François Cluzet, Marie-Josée Croze, Kristin Scott Thomas	Thriller	8 wins & 10 nominations
The Tiger Brigades	Jérôme Cornuau	Clovis Cornillac, Diane Kruger	Action	3 nominations
United 93	Paul Greengrass	Christian Clemenson, Cheyenne Jackson, David Alan Basche, Peter Hermann, Daniel Sauli, Trish Gates, Corey Johnson, Richard Bekins, Michael J. Reynolds, Khalid Abdalla	Biographical drama / Thriller	Co-production with United Kingdom and United States
When I Was a Singer	Xavier Giannoli	Gérard Depardieu, Cécile de France	Musical	Entered into the 2006 Cannes Film Festival
The Valet (2006 film)	Francis Veber	Gad Elmaleh, Alice Taglioni, Daniel Auteuil, Kristin Scott Thomas, Richard Berry, Virginie Ledoyen, Dany Boon	Comedy	The film was remade in India and the United States
