= Mhamed Arezki =

French actor of Kabyle origins

- Born: 1984 (age 41–42); Paris, France
- Occupation: Actor
- Years active: 2003–present
- Known for: Les Bleus: premiers pas dans la police Les Beaux Mecs; Candice Renoir; The Tourist; Zim and Co. Adieu Gary
- Awards: Best Young Actor for his role in Les Bleus, Festival du film de télévision de Luchon 2006.

Mhamed Arezki (born 1984) is a French actor of Algeria origins best known for his starring and supporting roles in French television series. He portrays Lyès Beloumi on the action packed, comedic, police drama Les Bleus, young Tony on the gangster mini-series Les Beaux Mecs and Brigadier Jean-Baptiste Medjaoui on another police drama, Candice Renoir. He is also known for his roles in such films as The Tourist (starring Angelina Jolie and Johnny Depp), Zim and Co. and Adieu Gary.

== Biography ==
Mhamed Arezki was born in Paris, France, in 1984. His mother was of Kabyle descent and worked as a nanny. His father was a chef. Mhamed always dreamed of being an actor. At the age of seventeen he quit school and started participating in various acting courses. His mother, knowing this was what her son wanted to do most, was very encouraging. At the end of a five-day course in film and theater acting, he was spotted by an agent who then brought him to a casting call. "I know, I have a lot of luck," He told Le Parisien in 2009.

== Career ==
=== Les Bleus ===
From 2006 to 2010 Arezki had a starring role in Les bleus: premiers pas dans la police, an action, comedy, drama about rookie cops learning the ropes. The first episode aired in France on 8 February 2006.

Arezki played the role of clumsy, good-natured, career driven Lyès Beloumi. He was in every episode of Seasons 1 and 2. For the third season he took a voluntary sabbatical to leave himself open for other roles and to explore the possibility of doing a one-man show. In 2010 he returned to Les Bleus for the fourth and final season. Lyes Beloumi had been away training and returned with the rank of Commissaire and now had his own office.

In 2013 Arezki reunited with Les Bleus co-star Raphaël Lenglet for the first season of Candice Renoir, a France 2 police drama series starring Cécile Bois as Commandant Candice Renoir. Lenglet and Arezki receive second and third billing respectively on French sites like Allociné.

== Filmography ==
Year	Title	Role	Director	Notes
2003	Lovely Rita, sainte patronne des cas désespérés	City boy	Stéphane Clavier	
2003	Poulet cocotte	Tarek	Vincent Solignac & Martial Vallanchon	Short
2003	Commissaire Moulin	Mouss	Jean-Luc Breitenstein	TV series (1 episode)
2004	La Ronde des Flandres	Karim	André Chandelle	TV movie
2004	Fabien Cosma	Aziz	Pierre Lary	TV series (1 episode)
2004-05	Une fille d'enfer	Momo	Bruno Garcia, Pascal Lahmani & Eric Figon	TV series (6 episodes)
2005	Zim and Co.	Cheb	Pierre Jolivet	
2006	Du jour au lendemain	Jimmy	Philippe Le Guay	
2006-10	Les Bleus	Lyes Beloumi	Didier Le Pêcheur, Christophe Douchand, ...	TV series (26 episodes); Luchon International Film Festival - Best Young Actor
2007	Nos enfants chéris	Chidra	Benoît Cohen	TV series (3 episodes)
2009	Adieu Gary	Icham	Nassim Amaouche	
2010	The Tourist	Achmed Tchebali	Florian Henckel von Donnersmarck	
2010	Frères	Radouane	Virginie Sauveur	TV movie
2011	Les beaux mecs	Tony	Gilles Bannier	TV series (4 episodes)
2012	Chien de guerre	Malik	Fabrice Cazeneuve	TV movie
2012	Vive la colo !	Edgar	Dominique Ladoge & Didier Le Pêcheur (2)	TV series (2 episodes)
2013	Mohamed Dubois	Hassen	Ernesto Oña	
2013	Cheba Louisa	Ahmed	Françoise Charpiat	
2013	Les Délices du Monde	Majid	Alain Gomis	TV movie
2013-15	Candice Renoir	Jean-Baptiste Medjaoui	Nicolas Picard, Stéphane Malhuret, ...	TV series (20 episodes)
2014	De guerre lasse	Rachid	Olivier Panchot	
2014	La crèche des hommes	Nasser	Hervé Brami	TV movie
2015	Virage Nord	Icham	Virginie Sauveur (2)	TV mini-series
2016	Team Spirit	Nouredine	Christophe Barratier	
2025	Leave One Day	Heddy	Amélie Bonnin	

== Awards ==
Festival du film de télévision de Luchon 2006 :

- Best young actor for his role in Les Bleus
  presented by Tchéky Karyo

== See also ==
- Les Bleus (TV series)
