= Luce (singer) =

French singer-songwriter and actress

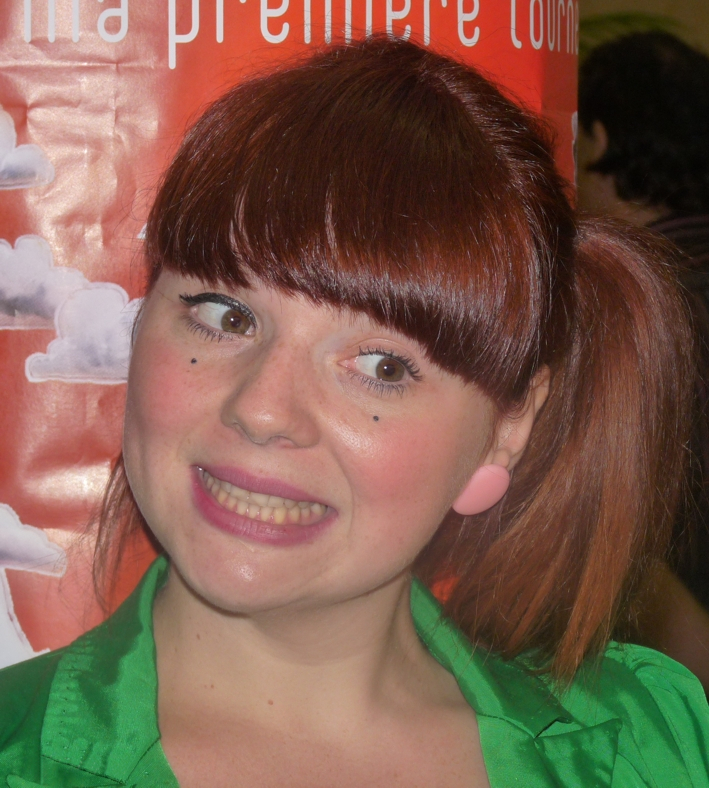
- Luce in 2011

Background information
- Born: Lucie Brunet; 28 January 1990 (age 36)
- Origin: Perpignan, France
- Genres: Pop
- Occupations: Singer-Songwriter, Actress
- Instrument: Vocals
- Years active: 2010–present
- Labels: Sony Music (2010/13); Tôt ou tard (2014–present)
- Website: Official Site

Lucie Brunet (born 28 January 1990), better known by the stage name Luce, is a French singer-songwriter and actress originating from Peyrestortes. She won the eighth series of the French music competition Nouvelle Star in 2010.

== Early life ==
Luce was born in Perpignan and studied nursing in Montpellier. She also practiced the flute following courses at the Conservatory of dramatic art between 2008 and 2009.

== Career ==
=== Nouvelle Star ===
She auditioned for Nouvelle Star (French Idol series) in Marseille where she sang Rita Mitsouko's "Andy" passing in the category Les Inoubliables wearing a moustache and an electronic badge saying "I love hairs." She received three yeses and a notable no from judge Philippe Manœuvre. Moving to the second phase at théâtre in Trianon, she interpreted "Tainted Love", a capella, and in a trio with Lussi et Stéphanie, she sang "Je dois m'en aller" from Niagara. She also sang "C'est comme ça" from Rita Mitsouko. She was chosen for the live show. She had great support from many people including a 90-year-old Jordi Barre who was invited to congratulate her when she won on 23 June 2010.

=== Appearances during Nouvelle Star ===
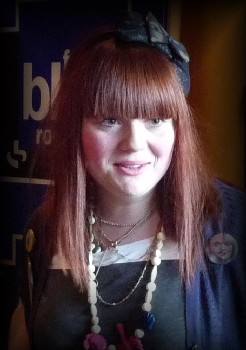
Luce in June 2010

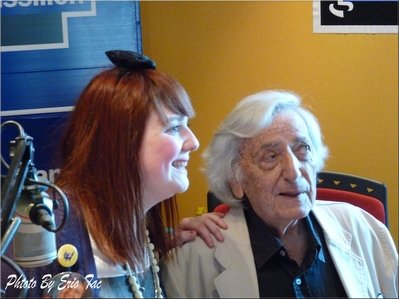
Luce and Jordi Barre

Solo

Date	Song	Original artist	Notes
14 April 2010 (1st prime)	"Qui de nous deux"	-M- (Matthieu Chedid)	4 blues
21 April 2010 (2nd prime)	"Dream a Little Dream of Me"	The Mamas and The Papas	4 blues
28 April 2010 (3rd prime)	"Étienne"	Guesch Patti	4 blues
5 May 2010 (4th prime)	"Beautiful"	Christina Aguilera	3 blues
13 May 2010 (5th prime)	"Louxor j'adore"	Philippe Katerine	3 blues
19 May 2010 (6th prime)	"Les sucettes"	France Gall	4 blues
19 May 2010 (6th prime)	"Tainted Love"	Gloria Jones	4 blues
26 May 2010 (7th prime)	"Miss You"	The Rolling Stones	2 blues
26 May 2010 (7th prime)	Gigi L'Amoroso	Dalida	4 blues
2 June 2010 (Quarter finals)	"La plus belle pour aller danser"	Sylvie Vartan	2 blues
2 June 2010 (Quarter finals)	"What's Love Got to Do with It"	Tina Turner	2 blues
9 June 2010(Semi-finals)	"Les Cactus"	Jacques Dutronc	4 blues
9 June 2010(Semi-finals)	"Over the Rainbow"	Judy Garland	4 blues
9 June 2010(Semi-finals)	"La vie en rose"	Édith Piaf	4 blues
16 June 2010 (Finals)	"Je dis aime"	-M- (Matthieu Chedid)	4 blues
16 June 2010 (Finals)	"Mad About You"	Hooverphonic	4 blues
16 June 2010 (Finals)	"Ne me quitte pas"	Jacques Brel	4 blues

In duos/trios

Date	Song	Other contestants in duo/trio	Original artist
21 April 2010 (2nd prime)	"Toutes les femmes de ta vie"	Annabelle, Lussi, Marine and Stéphanie	L5
28 April 2010 (3rd prime)	"Our House"	Lussi and Stéphanie	Madness
5 May 2010 (4th prime)	"Ça balance pas mal à Paris"	Annabelle and Benjamin	Michel Berger and France Gall
13 May 2010 (5th prime)	"Relator"	Dave	Pete Yorn and Scarlett Johansson
26 May 2010 (7th prime)	"Money, Money, Money"	Lussi	ABBA
2 June 2010 (Quarter finals)	"Pour un infidèle"	François	Cœur de pirate
2 June 2010 (Quarter finals)	La Carioca (dance)	Ramon	Alain Chabat and Gérard Darmon
9 June 2010 (Semi-finals)	"Dieu est un fumeur de havanes"	Ramon	Serge Gainsbourg and Catherine Deneuve
9 June 2010 (Semi-finals)	"Light My Fire"	François	The Doors
16 June 2010 (Finals)	22	François	Lily Allen and Ours
16 June 2010 (Finals)	"Capri, c'est fini"	François	Hervé Villard
16 June 2010 (Finals)	"Qu'est-ce que t'es belle"	François	Marc Lavoine and Catherine Ringer

=== 2010–2013: Première Phalange & Acting ===
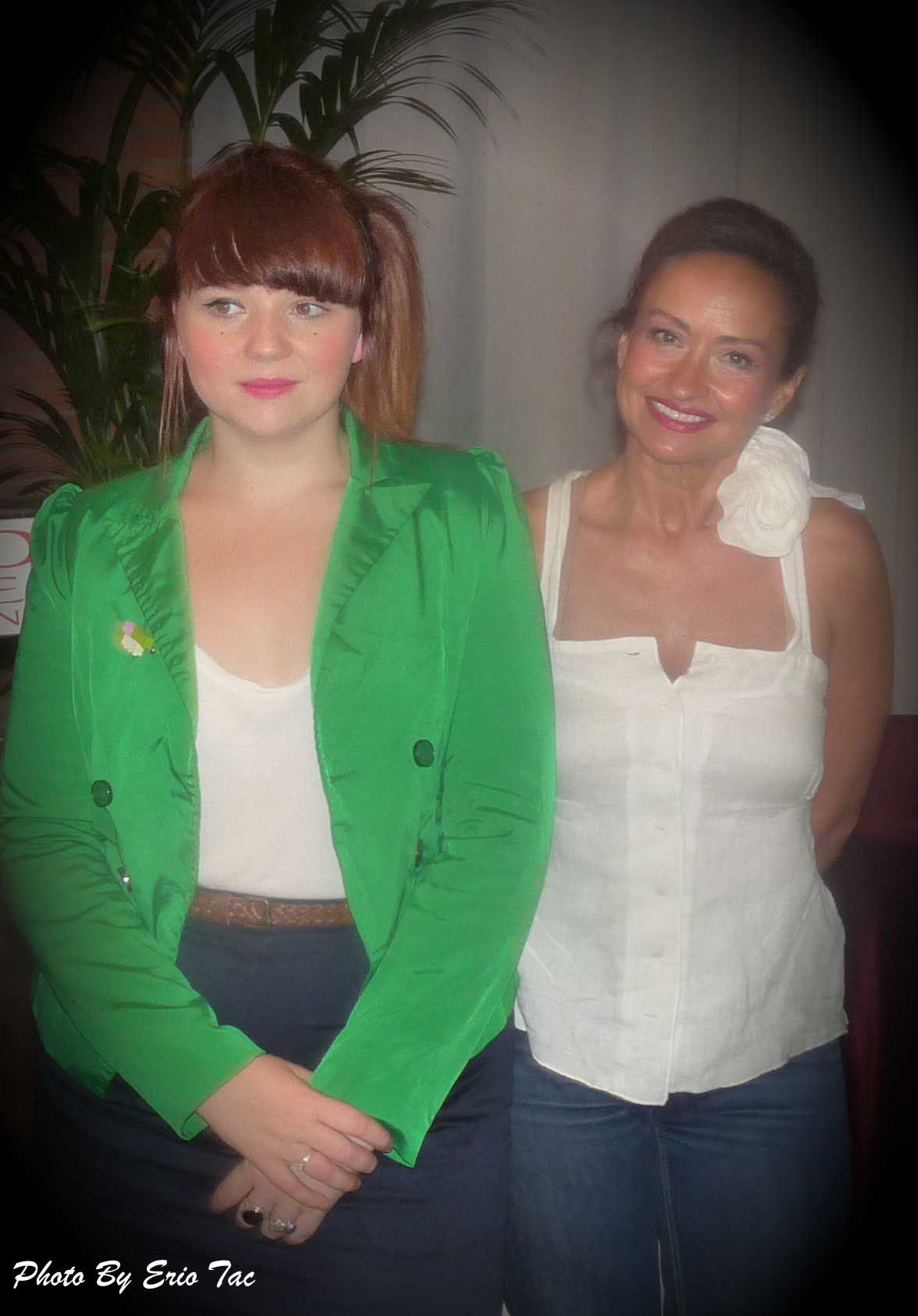
Luce and Marie Pierre Baux of 'Originales'

She had her first show after her win in Perpignan on 10 September 2010 after an invitation by Marie Pierre Baux, organizer for 23 years of Estivales de Perpignan festival. During this time, she share a duet with Alain Souchon

She also started preparing for her album collaborating with many writers and composers including Philippe Katerine, Orelsan and Mathieu Boogaerts. She used online promotion under the "jeudis de Luce" plan (meaning Luce's Thursdays) in which she would post every Thursday starting 24 March 2011, a video sketch directed by Najar and Perrot and produced by LNprod, with Luce playing herself and Gaël Giraudeau playing the role of Bobby. The presentations would also include portions of the "song of the week", basically one of the songs of the upcoming album Première Phalange.

Première Phalange was finally released on 20 June 2011 on Sony Music. On 25 November 2011, she gave a concert to the Trianon, where Mathieu Boogaerts and Orelsan appeared on stage. She also made a successful tour around the France.

In 2011, she also make a duet with Max Boublil accompanied by a videoclip.

In 2012, she made the chorus on the album of Mathieu Boogaerts who write for her several titles in her first album, Première Phalange.

Then, the company "Eveil et Découvertes" ask Luce to sing for them book-song "La Fabrique à Comptines", 13 rhymes. The project is a big success while there isn't a lot of promotion. More than 11 000 albums are sold.

The same year, Luce sing "Il pleut doucement ma mère" written by Maurice Carême in the album "La bande des mots", where poems are put in music. Artists like Oxmo Puccino, Françoise Hardy, Claire Keim, Élie Semoun, Camélia Jordana, Marc Lavoine, Jenifer or Arthur H are a part of the project.

In 2013, Luce sing on the album "Des mots pour Alzheimer" where she read a text written by a witness named Maria. Luce is directly involved by this album because it is released for the Alzheimer's disease because her grandmother is dead beaucause of this sickness. On her first album she sing the song "La symphonie d'Alzheimer" as a tribute to her grandmother. Alain Chamfort, Élie Semoun, Andréa Ferréol, Dominique Besnehard, Franz-Olivier Giesbert, Françoise Laborde, Jean Benguigui, Laurent Ruquier, Nelson Monfort, Michel Boujenah, Virginie Lemoine and Marc Lévy are also on the album.

The same year, she made the first part of Virginie Hocq during her show at the Olympia. During this evening she sang 8 titles in exclusivity of her second album. The two women have met on the set of the second season of Vive la colo!. She sing during a night for France Alzheimer, during this evening she sing with Alain Chamfort. She also sing during the Big dinner of Christmas to the Élysée Palace with ZUT. This evening was organized by the president François Hollande and his wife at the time Valérie Trierweiler. M. Pokora with the troupe of Robin des Bois were also there.

In December 2013, she sing with the band ZUT to the Zénith de Paris. She also sing to the special evening Nouvelle Star fête Noël where several former contestant to the Nouvelle Star performs, like Amel Bent, Julien Doré or Amandine Bourgeois. During the evening, she sing the success of Line Renaud, Étoile des neiges.

Still in 2013, she made her debut in the cinema with a supporting role in the comedy Nuts. The movie is produced by Tonie Marshall and starred Éric Elmosnino, Sophie Quinton, Valeria Golino, Évelyne Buyle, Anémone, Brigitte Sy, Partha Pratim Majumder, Marie Denarnaud and Gustave Kervern.

She also made her debut in television with a recurring role in the second season of Vive la colo ! aired on TF1.

She is also in the short Ce qui fait marcher les filles who promote ERAM.

=== 2014–present: Chaud & Showtime ===
In 2014, Luce begins the studio recording of her second album. She work again with Mathieu Boogaerts who write and direct the album, he has previously work with her on her first album, and she also work with: Joseph Chedid and Zaf Zapha. Her second album is not released with Sony Music Entertainment but with Tôt ou tard. Luce post on her Facebook a photo with Hélène Pince, Maryvette Lair and Cléa Vincent and she announced that they will made the chorus on her second album.

Her second album Chaud is released 23 February 2015 and the first single Polka has been released in December 2014. The second single is Malibu and it's released in February 2015. Luce performed Malibu at the Nouvelle Star on D8 with Mathieu Boogaerts, 26 February. Then 27 February, she performed Polka on C à vous on France 5. The same day she is a guest in the radio show Partons en Live aired on France Inter, hosted by her friend André Manoukian where she made a cover of Paroles, paroles.

In March 2015, she begin her Tour with Mathieu Boogaerts. She give 3 concerts to the Nouvelle Ève. She also sing to the festival Les Francos Gourmandes.

In 2015, she returned in the TV Series Hôtel de la plage, aired on France 2, where she played herself as a guest in an episode.

She made her debut on stage 22 June 2015, with the play "Cabaret Deret" played to the Théâtre de l'Atelier alongside Jean-Claude Deret, Zabou Breitman, Shirley & Dino, Myriam Boyer, Christine Murillo, Olivier Breitman, Les Mauvais élèves, Antonin Chalon, Antoine Larcher and Vadim Sher.

In July 2015, she made a concert to the Francofolies de La Rochelle still with Mathieu Boogaerts. The 22 July she made a concert to the Paléo Festival.

In September, Luce is preparing a special concert with Philharmonic where she will covered songs, including Cole Porter, Ella Fitzgerald or Frank Sinatra with the conductor Zahia Ziouani.

She passed a competition to enter in the Cours Florent. She is one of the 18 selected over 1,500 candidates. She begin training in September 2015.

The 4 February 2016, she is invited to pay tribute to Les Rita Mitsouko alongside other artists like Congopunq, Olivia Ruiz, Matthieu Chedid, Adrienne Pauly, Izïa, Sabina Sciubba, Moodoïd, Nosfell. She sing Ding Ding Dong (Ringing at Your Bell) & Andy. The concert is to the Théâtre du Rond-Point.

The 17 February 2016, she is invited to the 20th birthday of Mathieu Boogaerts's career. She sing Polka with him. The concert is broadcast on Arte The same day, an acoustic version of her song "Dans ma maman" with Boogaerts is posted by Bruxelles Ma Belle on YouTube.

The 26 February 2016, she made a cover of Le mambo du décalco by Richard Gotainer with her friend Jerome Laperruque.

The 2 April 2016, she is headline of the Festival Lyrics in Lys-lez-Lannoy. A choir sing in the first part of her concert, Luce's first album's songs.

During the Cours Florent, she play in Peer Gynt by Henrik Ibsen, Fragments by Jean-Luc Lagarce, Alone in Berlin by Hans Fallada and Les Montagnes Russes by Igor Mendjisky.

After the success of the concert with Zahia Ziouani, a tour is announced from 2016 to 2017 and the show is called Showtime !

In 2017, she joined the agency "Talent Box" which represents her.

In July 2017, she present the play A quand la mer ? to the Festival d'Avignon.

== Discography ==
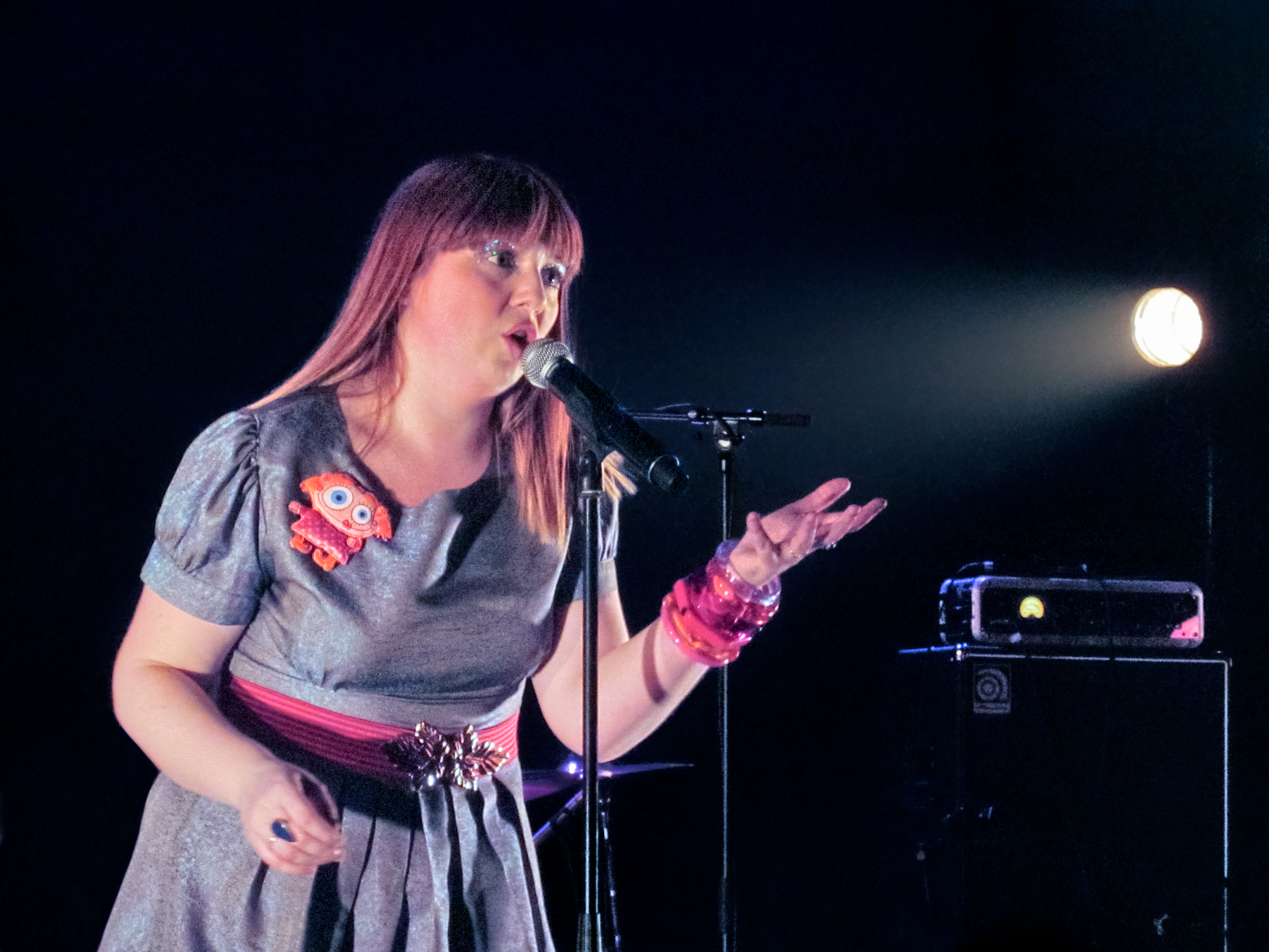
Luce in concert in 2012

=== Albums ===
Year	Album	Peak positions			Sales
Year	Album	FR	BEL (Wa)	SUI	Sales
2011	Première Phalange	11	27	54	25 000
2012	La Fabrique à comptines				11 000
2015	Chaud	55	100	–	10 000

=== Singles ===
- 2011: "Été noir"
- 2011: "Western Spaghetti"
- 2011: "La machine" (feat Orelsan)
- 2011: "Moyen, Moyenne" (feat Max Boublil)
- 2014: "Polka"
- 2015: "Malibu"

=== Participation ===
- 2012: Sing the chorus on the album "Mathieu Boogaerts" Of Mathieu Boogaerts
- 2012: "Il pleut doucement ma mère" by Maurice Carême on the album "La bande des mots"
- 2013: Reading the testimony of Maria for "Des mots pour Alzheimer"
- 2013: Collaboration with the band Zut, Clarika and Didier Wampas for the Album for children "Coucou Zut"
- 2014: "Je ne pense qu'à ça" ft. Noémie Brosset for her first album
- 2016: "C'est ça l'amour" ft. Mathieu Boogaerts for the album We Love Disney 3
- 2019: "J'aime quand les filles" ft. Ren-Ren for the album Hexagonistan Vol. 1

=== Tour ===
- 2011–2012: Première Phalange
- 2015–2016: Chaud (with Mathieu Boogaerts)
- 2016–2018: Showtime ! (with Zahia Ziouani & Divertimento Orchestra)
- 2018–2020: Lenny (with Zahia Ziouani & Divertimento Orchestra)

== Filmography ==
Year	Title	Role	Director	Notes
2013	Nuts	Solveig	Yann Coridian	
2013	Vive la colo !	Luna	Stéphane Clavier	TV series (6 episodes)
2015	Hôtel de la plage	Herself	Christian Merret-Palmair	TV series (1 episode)
2017	Bug	Crazygirl92	Cédric Prévost	Short
2017	Bizarre	The painter	Pablo Padovani	Video clip

=== Advertising ===
Year	Title	Role	Notes
2013	Ce qui fait marcher les filles	Camille	ERAM

== Theater ==
Year	Title	Writer	Director	Notes
2015	Cabaret Deret	Jean-Claude Deret	Zabou Breitman	
2016	Fragments	Jean-Luc Lagarce	Julie Brochen	
2016	Peer Gynt	Henrik Ibsen	Jean-Pierre Garnier	Olga Horstif Award
2016	Alone in Berlin	Hans Fallada	Jean-Pierre Garnier	Olga Horstif Award
2017	A quand la mer ?	Manuel Durand	Manuel Durand	
2017	Les Montagnes Russes	Igor Mendjisky	Igor Mendjisky	
2018	Il a vraiment quelque chose ce Laurent Romejko	Félicien Juttner	Félicien Juttner	
2019–22	Uneo uplusi eurstragé dies	Sophocles	Gwenaël Morin	
2020	The Theatre and its Double	Antonin Artaud	Gwenaël Morin	
2020–24	Denali	Nicolas Le Bricquir	Nicolas Le Bricquir	Nominated – Molière Award for Best Female Newcomer
2022–23	Songe à la douceur	Rachel Arditi, Clémentine Beauvais, Justine Heynemann & Manuel Peskine	Justine Heynemann	
2025	Pride and Prejudice* (*sort of)	Isobel McArthur	Johanna Boyé	
