= 31st César Awards =

2006 French film awards ceremony

- Date: 25 February 2006
- Site: Théâtre du Châtelet, Paris, France
- Hosted by: Valérie Lemercier

Highlights
- Best Film: The Beat That My Heart Skipped
- Best Actor: Michel Bouquet
- Best Actress: Nathalie Baye

Television coverage
- Network: Canal+

The 31st César Awards ceremony, presented by the Académie des Arts et Techniques du Cinéma, honoured the best films of 2005 in France and took place on 25 February 2006 at the Théâtre du Châtelet in Paris. The ceremony was chaired by Carole Bouquet and hosted by Valérie Lemercier. The Beat That My Heart Skipped won the award for Best Film.

The ceremony was marred by demonstrations by the intermittents (film industry workers), who lobbied for greater rights for temporary contract workers after running onto the stage before the start. The police had to evacuate the protesters, which ultimately led to a 23-minute delay to the start of the proceedings.

== Winners and nominees ==
The nominations were announced on 10 January 2006. Winners are highlighted in bold:

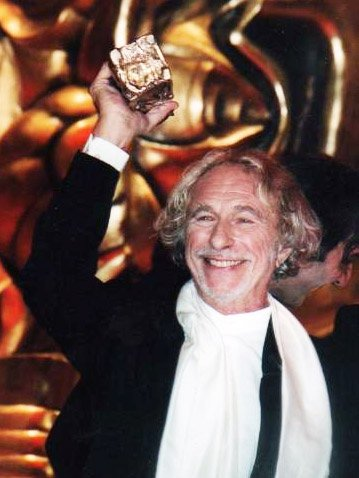
Pierre Richard, Honorary César recipient

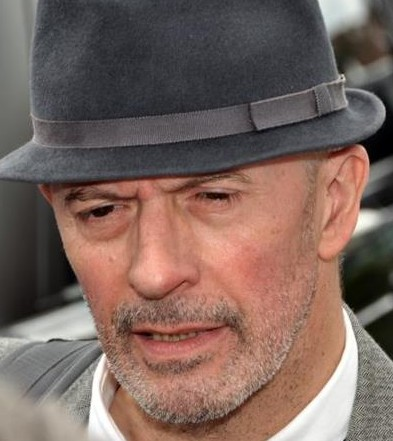
Jacques Audiard, Best Director winner

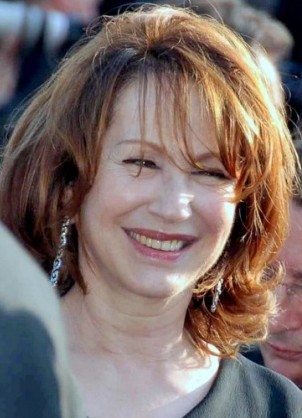
Nathalie Baye, Best Actress winner

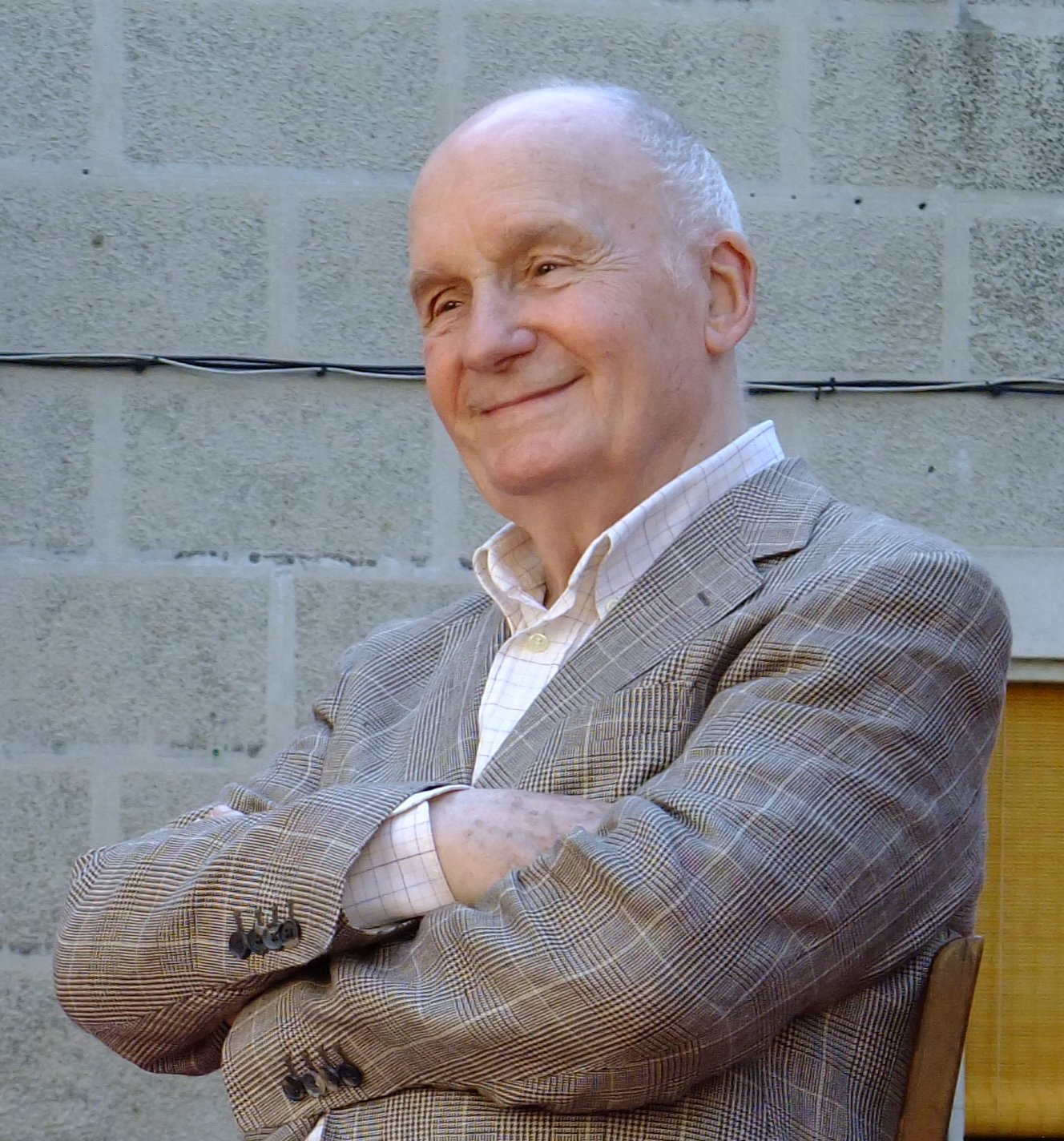
Michel Bouquet, Best Actor winner

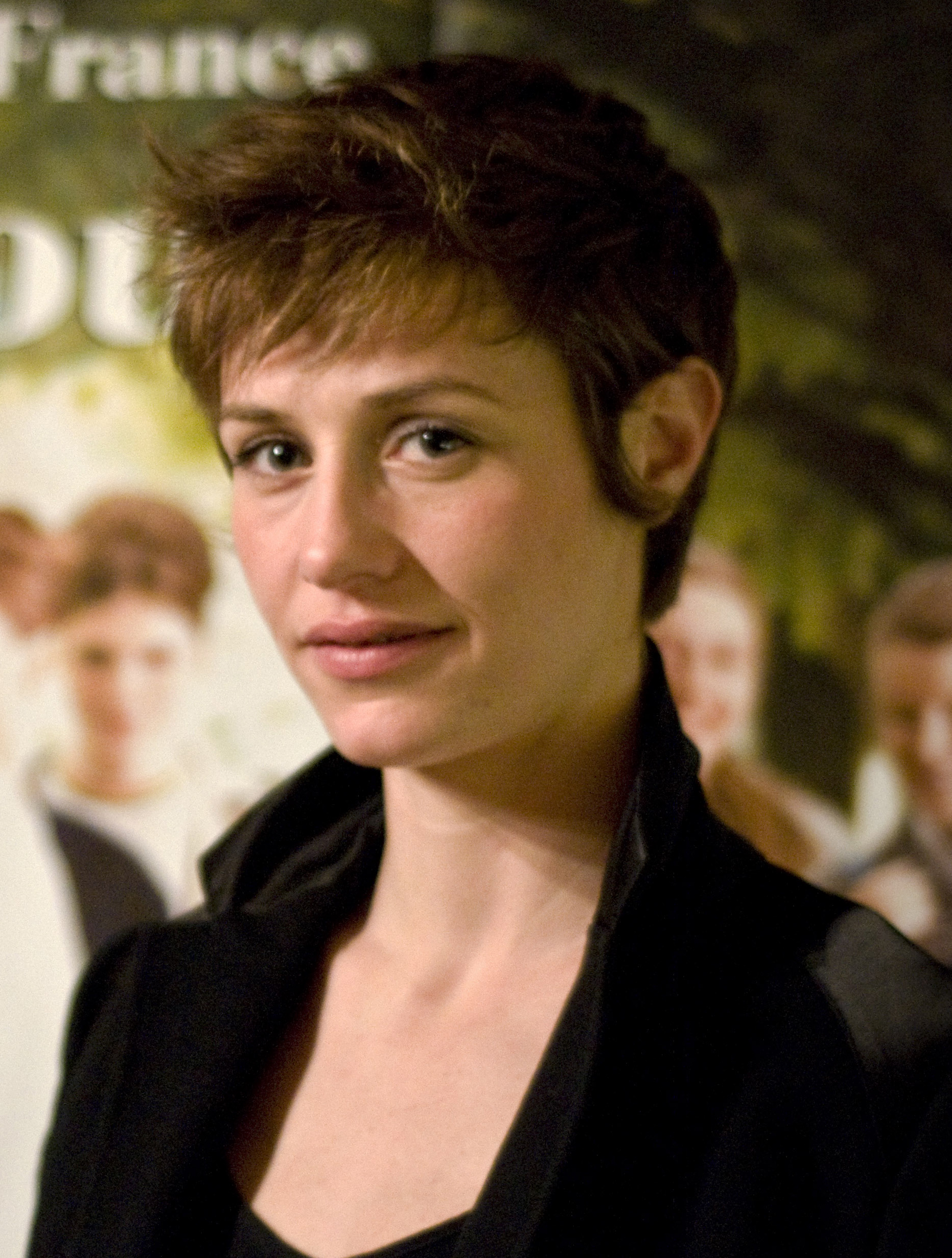
Cécile de France, Best Supporting Actress winner

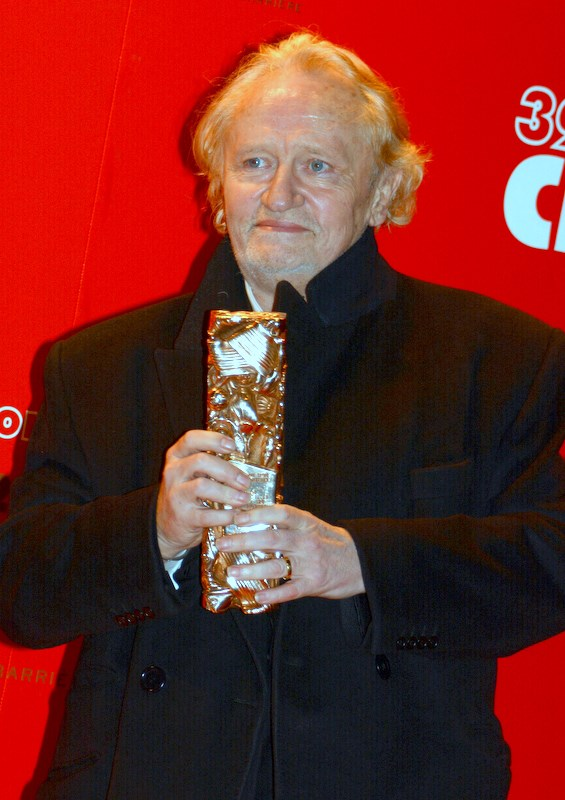
Niels Arestrup, Best Supporting Actor winner

**Best Film** **The Beat That My Heart Skipped**: L'Enfant; Live and Become; Joyeux Noël; The Young Lieutenant	**Best Director** **Jacques Audiard – The Beat That My Heart Skipped**: Xavier Beauvois – The Young Lieutenant; Jean-Pierre Dardenne and Luc Dardenne – L'Enfant; Michael Haneke – Caché; Radu Mihaileanu – Live and Become
**Best Actor** **Michel Bouquet – The Last Mitterrand**: Patrick Chesnais – Not Here to Be Loved; Romain Duris – The Beat That My Heart Skipped; José Garcia – The Axe; Benoît Poelvoorde – Entre ses mains	**Best Actress** **Nathalie Baye – The Young Lieutenant**: Isabelle Carré – Entre ses mains; Anne Consigny – Not Here to Be Loved; Isabelle Huppert – Gabrielle; Valérie Lemercier – Palais royal!
**Best Supporting Actor** **Niels Arestrup – The Beat That My Heart Skipped**: Maurice Bénichou – Caché; Dany Boon – Joyeux Noël; Georges Wilson – Not Here to Be Loved; Roschdy Zem – The Young Lieutenant	**Best Supporting Actress** **Cécile de France – Russian Dolls**: Catherine Deneuve – Palais royal!; Noémie Lvovsky – Backstage; Charlotte Rampling – Lemming; Kelly Reilly – Russian Dolls
**Most Promising Actor** **Louis Garrel – Regular Lovers**: Walid Afkir – Caché; Gilles Lellouche – Love Is in the Air; Aymen Saïdi – Saint-Jacques... La Mecque; Adrien Jolivet – Zim and Co.	**Most Promising Actress** **Linh Dan Pham – The Beat That My Heart Skipped**: Déborah François – L'Enfant; Mélanie Doutey – Il ne faut jurer... de rien!; Fanny Valette – Little Jerusalem; Marina Hands – Grey Souls
**Best Original Screenplay** **Live and Become** – **Alain-Michel Blanc and Radu Mihaileanu**: Caché – Michael Haneke; L'Enfant – Jean-Pierre Dardenne and Luc Dardenne; Joyeux Noël – Christian Carion; The Young Lieutenant – Xavier Beauvois, Guillaume Bréaud and Jean-Eric Troubat	**Best Adaptation** **The Beat That My Heart Skipped** – **Jacques Audiard and Tonino Benacquista**: The Axe – Costa-Gavras and Jean-Claude Grumberg; Entre ses mains – Anne Fontaine and Julien Boivent; Gabrielle – Patrice Chéreau and Anne-Louise Trividic; The Last Mitterrand – Georges-Marc Benamou and Gilles Taurand
**Best First Feature Film** **Darwin's Nightmare**: Anthony Zimmer; Cold Showers; March of the Penguins; Little Jerusalem	**Best Cinematography** **Stéphane Fontaine – The Beat That My Heart Skipped**: William Lubtchansky – Regular Lovers; Éric Gautier – Gabrielle
**Best Editing** **Juliette Welfling – The Beat That My Heart Skipped**: Sabine Emiliani – March of the Penguins; Francine Sandberg – Russian Dolls	**Best Sound** **Laurent Quaglio and Gérard Lamps – March of the Penguins**: Brigitte Taillandier, Pascal Villard, Cyril Holtz and Philippe Amouroux – The Beat That My Heart Skipped; Guillaume Sciama, Benoît Hillebrant and Olivier Dô Hùu – Gabrielle
**Best Original Music** **Alexandre Desplat – The Beat That My Heart Skipped**: Philippe Rombi – Joyeux Noël; Émilie Simon – March of the Penguins; Armand Amar – Live and Become	**Best Costume Design** **Caroline de Vivaise – Gabrielle**: Alison Forbes-Meyler – Joyeux Noël; Pascaline Chavanne – Grey Souls
**Best Production Design** **Olivier Radot – Gabrielle**: Jean-Michel Simonet – Joyeux Noël; Loula Morin – Grey Souls	**Best Short Film** **After Shave**: Obras; La Peur, petit chasseur; Sous le bleu
**Best Foreign Film** **Million Dollar Baby**: A History of Violence; The Sea Inside; Match Point; Walk on Water
**Honorary César** **Hugh Grant**; **Pierre Richard**

== Viewers ==
The show was followed by 2.5 million viewers. This corresponds to 13.6% of the audience.

== See also ==
- 78th Academy Awards
- 59th British Academy Film Awards
- 18th European Film Awards
- 11th Lumière Awards
