= Lenglet =

Lenglet is a French surname. Notable people with the surname include:

- Alfred Lenglet (born 1968), French chief superintendent and novelist
- Clément Lenglet (born 1995), French footballer
- Raphaël Lenglet (born 1975), French actor
- Olivier Lenglet (born 1960), French fencer
