= Paco Boublard =

French actor and photographer

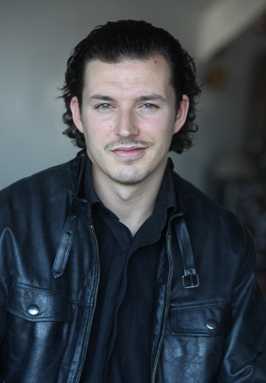
- Paco Boublard
- Born: 20 February 1981 (age 45); Paris, France
- Occupations: Actor, Photographer
- Years active: 2001–present

Paco Boublard (born 20 February 1981) is a French actor and photographer. He is known for his roles in various TV series and for his role in the film Regarde-moi (Look at Me) by Audrey Estrougo, which won three awards. Alongside his acting, he made a career as a journalist and photographer.

== Life and career ==
In 1999, Paco Boublard met his first talent agent, Stephane Lefebvre. He began his career by joining the small screen. In 2002 and 2003, performing roles in Commissaire Moulin, Navarro, or R.I.S, police scientifique which was his debut in television.

In 2005, he landed the lead role in the film Regarde-moi (Look at Me) by Audrey Estrougo (which film won Talents des Cités award 2005, Arlequin prize for Best Junior Screenplay 2006). That same year he joined the agency as agent agitator. In 2009, he was crowned best new actor at the Festival de la fiction TV de La Rochelle for his role in the TV movie fr:Belleville Story by Arnaud Malherbe (which incidentally, was also awarded the prize for best TV movie).

Meanwhile, Paco Boublard was developing a career as a photographer.

After meeting with director Stéphane Davi for various audiovisual projects, in 2010 he joined collectif artistique Objectif496.

== Filmography ==
=== Film ===
- 2015 : The Night Watchman : Le Bouclé
- 2014 : The Connection : Flic Stéphane
- 2013 : Mohamed Dubois : Julien
- 2012 : Paulette : Vito
- 2010 : L'Oiseau de Chine (Short) : Kylian
- 2010 : Les Princes de la nuit : Caid 4
- 2010 : Rebecca H. (Return to the Dogs) : Neighborhood Teenager
- 2010 : Le Mac : Doggy Bag
- 2008 : Secrets of State (Secret Défense) : Beur
- 2008 : Go Fast : Kader
- 2007 : Regarde-moi : Yannick
- 2002 : The Code (La Mentale) : Franck

=== Television ===
- 2013 : Léo Matteï, Brigade des Mineurs - (Season 1, Episode 1) : Cambrioleur 1 (Burglar 1)
- 2012 : Caïn - (Season 1, Episode 6 ) : Mohand
- 2011 : Victoire Bonnot - (Season 1, Episode 4) : Milan
- 2011 : Les Beaux Mecs (mini-series) - (Episodes 1-5 & 7) : Bambi
- 2010 : Enquêtes réservées - (Season 2, Episode 1) : Rougier
- 2010 : A Suspicion of Innocence (Un soupçon d'innocence) (TV Movie) : Tony
- 2010 : Belleville Story (TV Movie) : Freddy
- 2010-2013 : Boulevard du Palais - (S11, E04 & S15, E01&02) : Larrieu & Sherman
- 2009 : Julie Lescaut - (Season 20, Episode 1) : Valack
- 2009 : Les Tricheurs - (Season 3, Episode 1) : Marco
- 2008-2009 : Palizzi - (S01, E01&06 & S02, E28&31) : Steve & Résidant du foyer (Resident of the Home)
- 2008 : Night Squad - (Season 6, Episode 4) : Mourad
- 2008 : Cellule Identité - (Season 1, Episode 1) : Le jeune détenu (Young Prisoner)
- 2008 : Une Femme D'Honneur - (Season 1, Episode 37) : Sanchez
- 2007 : Diane - Crime Fighter (Diane Femme Flic) - (Season 4, Episode 6) : Pascal
- 2007 : Poison D'Avril (TV Movie) : Un jeune de banlieue (Suburban Youth)
- 2007 : RIS police scientifique - (Season 2, Episode 5) : Janson
- 2006 : Commissaire Moulin - (Season 8, Episode 3) : Duegi
- 2006-2009 : Les bleus: premiers pas dans la police - (S01, E01 & S02, E03-04) : Braqueur bijouterie 2 (Jewel Thief 2) & Nicolas
- 2002 : You'll Get Over It, (À cause d'un garçon) (TV Movie) : Swimming Teammate 1
- 2001 : Margaux Valence: Le secret d'Alice (TV Movie) : Luc

== Awards ==
- Révélation masculine of the Festival de la fiction TV de La Rochelle 2009 for the TV movie Belleville Story
