= Guilaine Londez =

French film actress

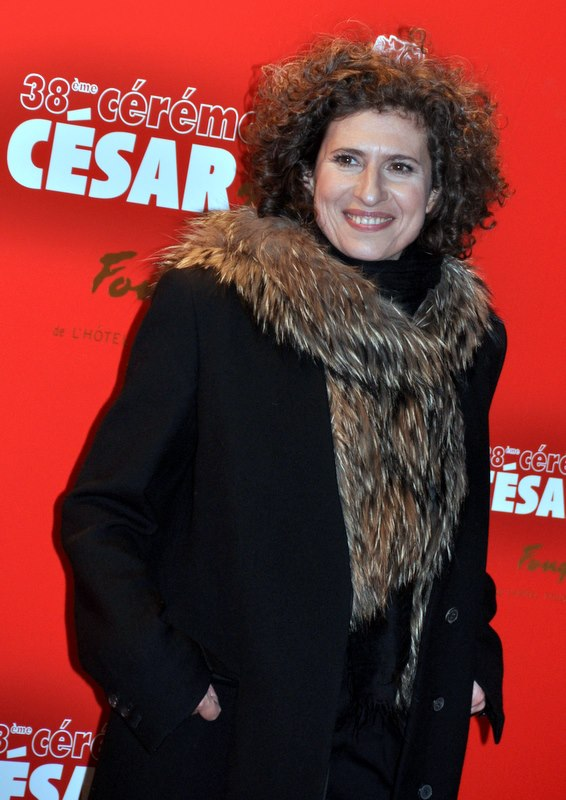
- Londez at the César Awards in 2013
- Born: Saint-Gilles, Gard, France
- Occupation: Actress
- Years active: 1990-present

Guilaine Londez is a French film actress.

== Career ==
Guilaine Londez started her career in theatre, in 1990.

She made her on-screen debut in 1991, playing the lead in the movie Night and Day directed by Chantal Akerman.

She starred in the 2022 film Mrs Harris Goes to Paris.

== Awards and recognition ==
In 2005, Londez received a nomination at the Molière Award for Best Supporting Actress for her work in the play L'Hiver sous la table directed by Zabou Breitman.

== Theater ==
Year	Title	Author	Director	Notes
1990	Blood on the Cat's Neck	Rainer Werner Fassbinder	Amahí Desclozeaux	
1993	Y’a t’une mouche sur l’mur	Georg Büchner	Gilles Nicolas	
1993	Sonate pour deux femmes seules et une cité hlm	Christian Liger	André Hampartzoumian	
1994	Tutu	Gilles Nicolas	Gilles Nicolas	
1996	Le Chant des chants	Henri Meschonnic	Patrick Haggiag	
2003–2004	The Imaginary Invalid	Molière	Philippe Faure	
2004–2005	L'Hiver sous la table	Roland Topor	Zabou Breitman	Nominated - Molière Award for Best Supporting Actress
2006–2011	Kafka Dances	Timothy Daly	Isabelle Starkier	
2007–2009	74 Georgia Avenue	Murray Schisgal	Stéphane Valensi	
2010	Strictement amical	Sylvie Blotnikas	Julien Rochefort	
2011	Maman revient pauvre orphelin	Jean-Claude Grumberg	Stéphane Valensi	
2012–2013	À la française	Édouard Baer	Édouard Baer	
2015–2019	Clérambard	Marcel Aymé	Jean-Philippe Daguerre	
2016–2018	Mille et une	Abdelwaheb Sefsaf, Marion Aubert, ...	Abdelwaheb Sefsaf	
2018–2020	Suite française	Irène Némirovsky	Virginie Lemoine	

== Filmography ==
Year	Title	Role	Director	Notes
1991	Night and Day	Julie	Chantal Akerman	
1993	Rupture(s)	Cordelia	Christine Citti	
1995	Happiness Is in the Field	Zig Thivart	Étienne Chatiliez	
1995	La vie parisienne		Hélène Angel	Short
1996	Une belle nuit de fête	Colette	Lionel Epp	Short
1996	Combats de femme	Nadine's lawyer	Pascale Bailly	TV series (1 episode)
1997	Adios !	Casting girl	Nicolas Joffrin	
1997	Le voisin		Marianne Visier	Short
1997	Le garçon d'orage	Marinette	Jérôme Foulon	TV movie
1998	Avocats & associés	Dolorès Oliveira	Philippe Triboit	TV series (1 episode)
1999	Superlove	Brigitte Doradée	Jean-Claude Janer	
1999	Le voyage à Paris	The operator	Marc-Henri Dufresne	
1999	Une journée de merde !	Gisèle	Miguel Courtois	
1999	Skin of Man, Heart of Beast	Annie	Hélène Angel	
1999	Personne avant toi	A sincere love	Olivier Lécot	Short
1999	Retour à Fonteyne	Isabelle	Philomène Esposito	TV movie
1999	N'oublie pas que tu m'aimes	Sandrine	Jérôme Foulon	TV movie
1999	La crim'	Anne Risseau	Miguel Courtois	TV series (1 episode)
2001	Liberté-Oléron	Albertine Monot	Bruno Podalydès	
2001	Beautiful Memories	Isabelle	Zabou Breitman	
2001	L'Art (délicat) de la séduction	Real estate agent	Richard Berry	
2001	Le maire		Patrick Volson	TV movie
2001	L'Algérie des chimères	Sister Filomena	François Luciani	TV mini-series
2001	H	Émilie	Éric Lartigau	TV series (1 episode)
2002	Comme un avion	The manicure	Marie-France Pisier	
2002	Qui mange quoi ?	The hostess	Jean-Paul Lilienfeld	TV movie
2002	Une autre femme	The teacher	Jérôme Foulon	TV movie
2002	Le juge est une femme	Pépita	Pierre Boutron	TV series (1 episode)
2002–2004	Le Camarguais	Maryse	Olivier Langlois, Patrick Volson, ...	TV series (8 episodes)
2002–2012	Le 17	Inès Pérec	Bénabar, Éric Lavaine, ...	TV series (7 episodes)
2003	I, Cesar	The teacher	Richard Berry	
2003	Anomalies passagères	Carmen	Nadia Fares	TV series (1 episode)
2004	L'âge de raison	The mother	Myriam Aziza	Short
2005	Zim and Co.	The judge	Pierre Jolivet	
2005	Oublier Cheyenne	Béatrice	Valérie Minetto	
2006	Four Stars	Marianne	Christian Vincent	
2006	Jean-Philippe	Babette	Laurent Tuel	
2006	Joséphine, ange gardien	Madame Pinel	Laurent Lévy	TV series (1 episode)
2007	Could This Be Love?	Birgitte	Pierre Jolivet	
2007	Surprise !	Brigitte	Fabrice Maruca	Short
2007	Les jurés	Brigitte	Bertrand Arthuys	TV mini-series
2008	Les insoumis	Mireille	Claude-Michel Rome	
2008	La très très grande entreprise	Brigitte Lamarcq	Pierre Jolivet	
2008	Clémentine	Clara	Denys Granier-Deferre	TV movie
2008	La mort dans l'île	Magali	Philippe Setbon	TV movie
2008	J'ai pensé à vous tous les jours	Theresa	Jérôme Foulon	TV movie
2009	Madre Mia	The mother	Stefan Libiot	
2009	Park Benches	The wallpapers client	Bruno Podalydès	
2009	Mac Orlan	Dora / Nora	Patrick Poubel	TV series (4 episodes)
2010	No et moi	Sylvie	Zabou Breitman	
2010	Sibylle	The superior	Naël Marandin	Short
2010	À 10 minutes de la plage	Chimène Ramirez	Stéphane Kappes	TV movie
2010	Histoires de vies		Valérie Minetto	TV series (1 episode)
2010	Les Petits Meurtres d'Agatha Christie	Mademoiselle Thuleau	Eric Woreth	TV series (1 episode)
2011	Mon arbre	Isa	Bérénice André	
2011	Bienvenue à bord	The picker	Éric Lavaine	
2011	Propriété interdite	Eliane	Hélène Angel	
2011	Le jour de la grenouille	The nurse	Béatrice Pollet	
2011	Mar Vivo	Emmanuelle	Cyril Brody	Short
2012	The Stroller Strategy	The nurse	Clément Michel	
2012	Moi à ton âge !	Madame Maréchal	Bruno Garcia	TV movie
2013	12 ans d'âge	Charles's colleague	Frédéric Proust	
2013	Vive la France	Aunt Nanette	Michaël Youn	
2013	Ogres niais	The mayor	Bernard Blancan	Short
2013	La croisière	Alice Fagondo	Pascal Lahmani	TV series (1 episode)
2013	Vive la colo !	Capucine Kabik	Stéphane Clavier	TV series (4 episodes)
2014	Passage du désir	Yvette	Jérôme Foulon	TV mini-series
2014	Origines	Sister Astrid	Jérôme Navarro	TV series (6 episodes)
2015	Encore heureux	Madame Martin	Benoît Graffin	
2015	Murders at Carcassonne	Éliane Carvalho	Julien Despaux	TV movie
2015	La clinique du docteur H	Edwige	Olivier Barma	TV movie
2016	Camping 3	The waitress	Fabien Onteniente	
2016	Open at Night	The guardian	Édouard Baer	
2016	Back to Mom's	Catherine	Éric Lavaine	
2016	Garde de nuit	Anne	Florent Gouëlou	Short
2016	Mongeville	Claude Bullion	Stéphane Malhuret	TV series (1 episode)
2016	Le juge est une femme	Annick Laforge	Akim Isker	TV series (1 episode)
2017	Primaire	Madame Duru	Hélène Angel	
2017	Sales gosses	Alex's mother	Frédéric Quiring	
2017	Cherif	Hélène Sinclair	Akim Isker	TV series (1 episode)
2017	Paris etc	The school director	Zabou Breitman	TV series (2 episodes)
2017–2019	On va s'aimer un peu, beaucoup	Colette	Julien Zidi & Stéphane Malhuret	TV series (15 episodes)
2017–2020	Les Bracelets Rouges	Dr. Louise Riffier	Nicolas Cuche, Christophe Campos, ...	TV series (15 episodes)
2018	Photo de famille	Françoise	Cécilia Rouaud	
2018	The Summer House	Pauline	Valeria Bruni Tedeschi	
2018	L'ordre des médecins	Dr. Eva Jeantet	David Roux	
2018	Lendemain de mariage	Maryse	Clément C. Fabre & Robin Fabre	Short
2018	Call My Agent!	Isabelle Huppert 2	Marc Fitoussi	TV series (1 episode)
2019	Chamboultout	Bérangère Mazuret	Éric Lavaine	
2019	Plot	Anémone	Sébastien Auger	Short
2019	Caïn	Anita	Bertrand Arthuys	TV series (1 episode)
2020	Éléonore	Johanna	Amro Hamzawi	
2020	The Speech	Adrien's mother	Laurent Tirard	
2020	Les Rivières pourpres	The orphanage's director	Olivier Barma	TV series (1 episode)
2020	Das Boot	Sylvie Maille	Rick Ostermann	TV series (3 episodes)
2021	Benedetta	Nun Jacopa	Paul Verhoeven	
2021	Bloody Oranges	Mademoiselle Mi	Jean-Christophe Meurisse	
2021	L'ami qui n'existe pas	Dr. Castéran	Nicolas Cuche	TV movie
2022	Classico	Thérèse	Nathanaël Guedj & Adrien Piquet-Gauthier	
2022	Juste ciel!	Sister Béatrice	Laurent Tirard	
2022	Lie with Me	Gaëlle Flamand	Olivier Peyon	
2022	Mrs. Harris Goes to Paris	Madame Avallon	Anthony Fabian	
2022	L'histoire d'Annette Zelman	Kaïla Zelman	Philippe Le Guay	TV movie
2022	Qu'est-ce qu'elle a ma famille?	Agnès	Hélène Angel	TV movie
2023	La vie au Canada	Marianne	Frederic Rosset	Short
2023	Les enchantés		Stanislas Carré de Malberg	TV movie
2023	Canis Familiaris	Sultan	Joris Goulenok	TV mini-series
2024	Shepherds (Berger)		Sophie Deraspe	
