= Could This Be Love? =

- Poster
- French: Je crois que je l'aime
- Directed by: Pierre Jolivet
- Written by: Pierre Jolivet; Simon Michaël
- Produced by: Frédéric Bourboulon; Pierre Kubel
- Starring: Vincent Lindon; Sandrine Bonnaire
- Cinematography: Pascal Ridao
- Edited by: Yves Deschamps
- Distributed by: Mars Distribution
- Release date: 21 February 2007
- Running time: 90 minutes
- Country: France
- Language: French
- Budget: $8.4 million
- Box office: $6.7 million

Could This Be Love? (French: Je crois que je l'aime; lit. 'I think I love them') is a 2007 French comedy film directed by Pierre Jolivet.

== Cast ==
- Vincent Lindon - Lucas
- Sandrine Bonnaire - Elsa
- François Berléand - Roland Christin
- Kad Merad - Rachid
- Liane Foly - Jeanne Larozière
- Hélène de Saint-Père - Sophie
- Guilaine Londez - Birgitte
