= High Lane (film) =

2009 French horror film

- Theatrical release poster
- Vertige
- Directed by: Abel Ferry
- Written by: Johanne Bernard (scenario), Louis-Paul Desanges (scenario)
- Starring: Fanny Valette; Johan Libéreau; Nicolas Giraud; Raphaël Lenglet
- Production companies: Gaumont; Sombrero Films
- Distributed by: Gaumont
- Release date: June 24, 2009 (France)
- Running time: 84 minutes
- Country: France
- Language: French
- Budget: $1.5 million
- Box office: $2,195,209

High Lane (Original French title: Vertige) is a 2009 French slasher film directed by Abel Ferry. The film centers around a group of friends who are hunted by a mentally deranged serial killer while climbing a dangerous trail up in the mountains.

== Plot ==
Young adults Fred (Nicolas Giraud), his girlfriend Karine and their friends Chloé (Fanny Valette), a nurse grappling with guilt after accidentally killing a young patient; Guillaume (Raphaël Lenglet), who harbors feelings for Chloé; and Loïc (Johan Libéreau), Chloé's unpopular boyfriend, travel to Croatia to climb and hike. They find the starting point closed off with rocks but experienced climber Fred convinces the others, including Chloé's boyfriend Loïc, to cross the track. The inexperienced Loïc is consistently paralyzed with fear, often needing encouragement from Chloé to continue. As their journey progresses, they realize that the trail is more dangerous than they had first thought: an unstable rope bridge collapses after their crossing, nearly killing Karine. With the bridge gone, the group realizes that they cannot turn back, and Fred, feeling guilty after persuading the group to hike a closed-off trail, tells them that they need to go to the end as quickly as possible.

Fred climbs ahead with Karine as the rest of the group hangs off of a cliff, but is wounded in a bear trap. As Karine tries to pry the trap off of his leg, the rest of the group struggles as a vertigo-stricken Loïc fails to belay the rope; Loïc ignores advice from Guillaume, jealous and hostile because of the latter's obvious feelings for Chloé. Loïc's support fails and he falls, bringing the attached Guillaume down with him, and the two are suspended as Chloé looks on in horror. Meanwhile, Fred tells Karine to leave him and retrieve the others. Soon after Karine leaves, Fred hears movement in the trees around him as the chain to the trap tightens, and he is suddenly dragged off.

Karine uses a rope to bring help the rest of the group to the top, but when they return, Fred is missing, but Loïc finds blood on the surrounding foliage, and the empty, bloodstained bear trap is found discarded. Karine, though confused as to how he managed to get out of the trap when they could not open it before, panics and believes that Fred must have wandered off and gotten lost. Chloé assures Karine that they will look for Fred despite the fact that it is becoming dark and Fred's bag had the flares inside. As they search, Loïc and Guillaume bicker over Chloé and begin to grapple. Chloé, going over to break them up, falls into a pit trap. Karine rappels down and finds a poacher's trap full of spikes; one went through Chloé's arm and she is injured. As they watch Karine rescue Chloé, Guillaume feels they are being watched and tells Loïc, who ignores him. When Karine finally rescues Chloé, Chloé realizes that the trap is a poacher's trap; they wonder what could be the prey.

Rain pours as the group ropes themselves together and searches for Fred. Karine, at the end of the rope, is hit by an arrow through the chest; when she pulls her rope, she finds that it has been cut. A shocked Chloé notices and tries to rush towards her, but Karine is suddenly pulled and dragged away. Chloé, distraught, tries to find her, and Loïc insists that they should abandon Fred and Karine to escape. As they continue on they find a cabin in the forest and enter; inside, a naked and bloodied Fred is lying on a slab, and though Chloé tries to save him, he dies shortly after from shock and his wounds; Loïc covers his body with a sheet.

Guillaume finds a door to the basement and goes down to find Fred's bag; there he also finds animal pelts, shackles, hunting equipment, and hanging severed heads. On the wall is the name "Anton." Guillaume realizes that the poacher, named Anton, must live alone in the cage, but when he tries to tell Loïc, the latter refuses to listen. Loïc pushed Guillaume down the stairs to the basement, accidentally knocking him unconscious. Loïc locks him in the basement and tries to tell Chloé to leave with him (with the lie that Guillaume was trying to abandon the both of them), but Chloé, disturbed at his behavior, refuses. Anton suddenly returns with Karine's corpse, and Chloé is briefly knocked unconscious as Loïc ineffectually grapples with Anton. Chloé regains consciousness and helps Loïc fight Anton, but when she manages to get an advantage over Anton and looks to her boyfriend to help, the cowardly Loïc flees with a flare, leaving her to die. Chloé is quickly overpowered by Anton.

Chloé and Guillaume, shackled to the wall in the basement, hear Anton eviscerate the corpses of Fred and Karine. Though Chloé is close to escaping from the shackles, Anton returns and takes her upstairs to kill her. Meanwhile, Loïc's flare dies and he reluctantly returns to the cabin. Guillaume, fighting to save Chloé, escapes his bonds and yells through the basement trapdoor for Chloé to call the poacher Anton. The poacher pauses, and Loïc appears to attack Anton. An enraged Anton chases a fleeing Loïc, giving Chloé enough time to escape and free Guillaume. Guillaume wants to escape to the nearby cable, but Chloé insists on saving Loïc.

Anton chases Loïc with a crossbow and shoots Loïc in the leg, but Loïc fights Anton, stabbing him and hitting him with a rock several times, though he flees to the cable before killing him. However, he misjudges the distance and ends up on the wrong cliff, and in escaping Anton climbs down an unstable cliffside ladder. Loïc calls for help, and Chloé and Guillaume arrive. Guillaume initially tries to pull him up, but is overcome by hatred and anger from Loïc trapping him in Anton's house, and lets him fall to his death off the cliffside. Guillaume tells Chloé that he had slipped and the two embrace; however, it is cut short when Anton shoots a crossbow arrow through Guillaume's head, killing him.

An enraged Chloé charges at Anton with a knife and attacks him. The two fight, but Anton gains the upper hand and begins to beat her. Chloé says his name, making him pause once more, and she cuts his neck with the knife. Though she has an opening to kill him, a flashback to her dead patient makes her realize that she cannot do it. Leaving him to die, Chloé escapes to the cable and in tearful joy begins the descent to safety. However, she leaves her knife behind, and Anton takes it up and goes to the cable in a fit of rage. The last shot is of Chloé traveling down the cable, and a loud snap is heard before the film cuts to black, implying that Anton managed to cut the cable. The film ends with the note that Loïc's body was found; Fred, Karine, Guillaume, Chloé were never found and that countless people go missing in the Balkans past every year.

== Cast ==
- Fanny Valette as Chloé
- Johan Libéreau as Loïc
- Nicolas Giraud as Fred
- Raphaël Lenglet as Guillaume
- Maud Wyler as Karine
- Justin Blanckaert as Anton
- Guilhem Simon as an adolescent, Chloé's deceased patient

== Reception ==
On Rotten Tomatoes the film has an approval rating of 60% based on reviews from 5 critics.

John Fallon of Arrow in the Head gave the film a score of 6/10, commending its direction, suspenseful setup, and score, while criticizing its cliche-ridden second half, writing, "All in all Vertige's last block never lived up to its first half but as whole I really enjoyed it and I recommend it for the striking camera work and wow mountain climbing scenes alone." Bloody Disgusting lambasted High Lane, finding that while its climbing scenes and gruesome set pieces were enjoyable, the film as a whole was "annoying" due to its bad acting, obnoxious score, uncharismatic villain, and "hackneyed script." Patrick Cooper of CHUD.com opined that High Lane was "a well-acted, well-directed, well-shot film, but sadly one that brings nothing new to the table" while Coming Soon's Robert Sims called it "predictable but effective" and "the European answer to The Hills Have Eyes." While Dread Central's Scott A. Johnson expressed distaste for High Lane's nonsensical flashbacks, unlikable characters, and nebulous plot developments, he still gave the film a score of 4/5, calling it "a remarkably intense ride that keeps the audience cringing on the edge of their seats" before concluding, "The bottom line is simply this: High Lane is tense. It's taut. It's a nerve-ripping thriller with a dash of slasher thrown in for good measure."

DVD Talk's Kurt Dahlke gave the film a 2 1/2, out of a possible 5, and wrote, "Despite awesome early action and slow-building tension, High Lane ends up muddled and clichéd. Newcomer director Abel Ferry grabs a couple of obvious elements, one old and one new, and doesn't do much to doctor them up. Even unvarnished, Ferry's can't fail first half works marvelously, but when things ultimately devolve into chaotic cliché, only the undiscriminating, and those new to horror, will remain tuned in." James Dennis of Screen Anarchy labelled the film "a familiar slasher/redneck horror" and went on to say, "For half its running time High Lane manages to be a tense, if not original, rock-climbing thriller – a French Cliffhanger for teens. But, half way through, when the threat becomes human, things tumble down hill and first time feature director Abel Ferry loses his way." Fellow Screen Anarchy reviewer Todd Brown was more lenient towards the film, writing, "The great strength of Ferry's Vertige isn't necessarily that it surprises but that, with the exception of one unnecessary plotline, Ferry serves up a collection of realistic characters in a stunning natural environment with lean, brisk efficiency. This is a film that knows what it is, that knows what its audience wants to see, and delivers precisely that with a minimum of fuss and bother."

Rob Hunter of Film School Rejects gave the film a B+ grade, and wrote, "Director Abel Ferry isn't reinventing the wheel here, and he never pretends to be. His model is clearly a mash-up of films like Wrong Turn, Wolf Creek, and the Norwegian thriller Cold Prey, and he succeeds at least in part. Working against him and his film though is a screenplay featuring at least one ridiculously annoying character, a villain with no clear motivation or reason to be, and a recurring series of flashbacks for one character that serve zero purpose. Other than these three issues the movie is a fast moving and fairly solid genre effort." Todd Martin of Horror News gave the film a glowing recommendation, writing, "I went into Vertige, a new horror film from France with high hopes and I am happy to report that I wasn't let down in the very least. I thought that it ruled and think that anyone who is into slasher flicks like I am will enjoy it."
