= Maximilian (miniseries) =

2017 miniseries directed by Andreas Prochaska

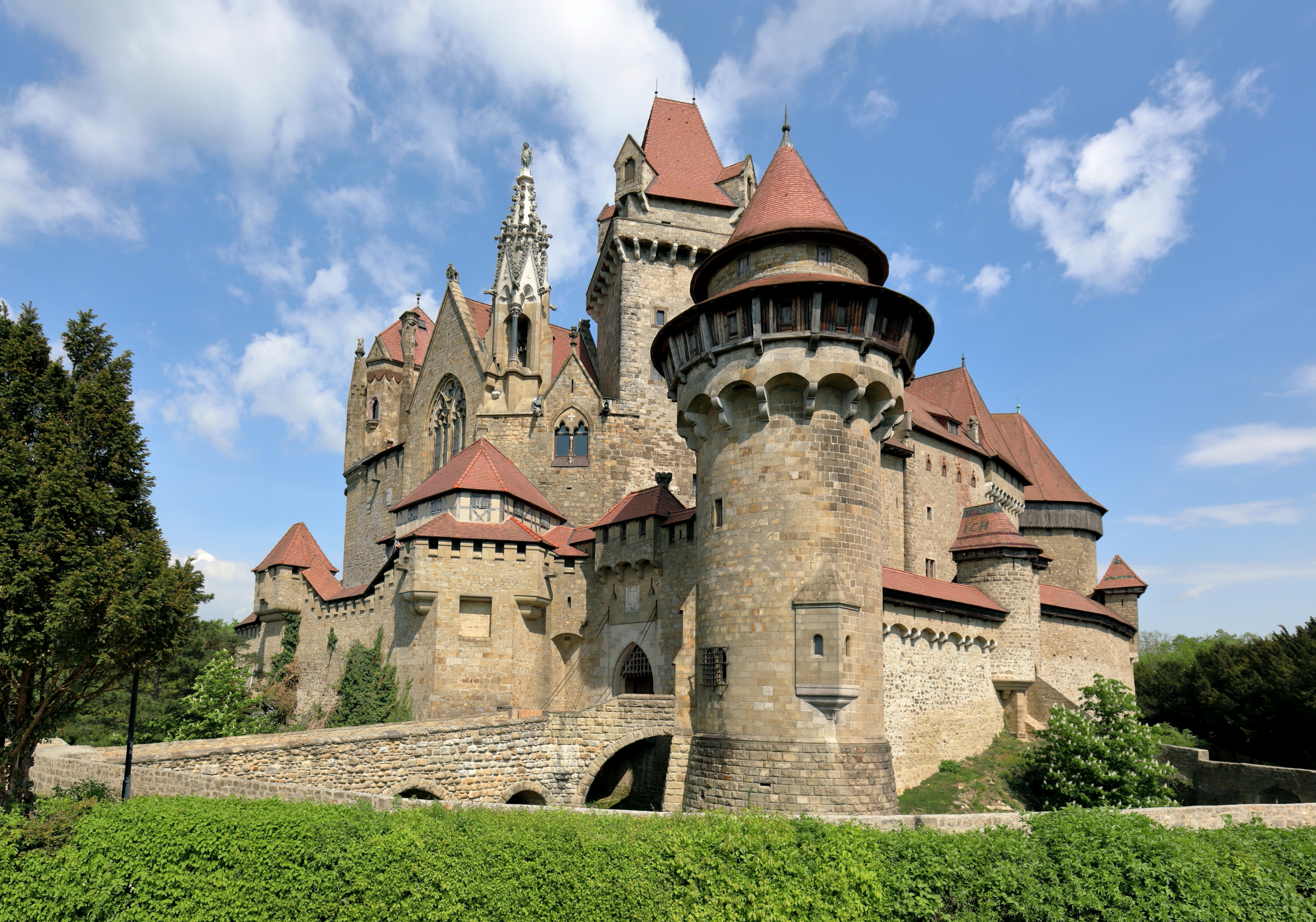
- The film was partly filmed at Burg Kreuzenstein, which was rebuilt in the nineteenth century as a fictive residence for Maximilian by his great admirer, the Arctic explorer Count Johann Nepomuk Wilczek.
- Also known as: Maximilian – Das Spiel von Macht und Liebe
- Genre: Historical drama
- Directed by: Andreas Prochaska
- Starring: Christa Théret; Jannis Niewöhner; Jean-Hugues Anglade; Stefan Pohl; Raphaël Lenglet; Johannes Krisch; Tobias Moretti; Sylvie Testud
- Countries of origin: Germany; Austria
- Original languages: German; French
- No. of seasons: 1
- No. of episodes: 3

Production
- Editor: Daniel Prochaska
- Production companies: MR Film; Beta Film; ORF; ZDF

Original release
- Network: ORF 1 (Austria); ZDF (Germany)
- Release: 1 March – 3 March 2017

Maximilian – Das Spiel von Macht und Liebe ("Maximilian: The Game of Power and Love"), released in the United States as Maximilian and Marie De Bourgogne or simply Maximilian, is a 2017 German-Austrian three-part historical miniseries. It is set in 1477, and stars Jannis Niewöhner as Maximilian I and Christa Théret as Mary of Burgundy. It was directed by Andreas Prochaska. It had its world premiere at the Urania movie theater in Vienna, then aired on the Austrian network ORF 1 in March 2017, and on the German network ZDF in October 2017. It was acquired and made available for streaming by American cable network Starz in April 2018.

== Plot ==
When Charles the Bold, Duke of Burgundy, dies in battle, his heiress and only child Mary, intends to rule alone, despite being coveted by various suitors. Mary resists the rich Ghent burghers who, in cahoots with Louis XI of France, try to force her to marry the Dauphin Charles, a boy who is of a weak mentality and twelve years younger than her. Meanwhile, the Holy Roman Emperor Frederick III wants his son, Maximilian, to marry the duchess.

Witnessing her ministers being executed and her territories invaded by France, Mary decided to send her lady-in-waiting Johanna von Hallewyn to Maximilian with a message.

The young and warlike Maximilian despises his father's sluggishness and aversion to his enemies like the Hungarian King Matthias Corvinus. Although he was in love with his sister Kunigunde's lady-in-waiting Rosina von Kraig, ultimately he decided for the marriage as a chance to prove himself.

After overcoming many dangers, the prince and the duchess finally meet each other. The two find that they share many similarities and develop sympathy for each other. Johanna falls in love with Maximilian's close friend Wolfgang von Polheim, which temporarily give them some troubles because she's a married woman. Mary gives birth to a son, Philip. Maximilian defeats the invading French army at the Battle of Guinegate. Not long after this, they have a daughter. But at the height of their happiness, a fatal accident befalls Mary while the couple are hunting together, leaving Maximilian alone with the children.

== Principal cast ==
Role	Actor/Actress	Voice
Maria von Burgund	Christa Théret	Sophie Rogall
Maximilian	Jannis Niewöhner	
Margareta von York	Alix Poisson	Carin C. Tietze
Johanna von Hallewyn	Miriam Fussenegger	
Wolfgang von Polheim	Stefan Pohl	
Philippe de Commynes	Nicolas Wanczycki	Torben Liebrecht
Olivier de la Marche	Raphaël Lenglet	Patrick Schröder
Olivier le Daim	Thierry Pietra	Matthias Kupfer
Ludwig XI.	Jean-Hugues Anglade	Martin Umbach
Dauphin Charles	Max Baissette	Angelo Ciletti
Charlotte de Savoie	Sylvie Testud	Alexandra Mink
Guy de Brimeu	Yvon Back	Thomas Wenke
Guillaume Hugonet	André Penvern	Erich Ludwig
Anne de France	Caroline Godard	Vanessa Lill
Jeanne	Melusine Mayance	Laura Jenni
Adolf von Egmond	Fritz Karl	
Haug von Werdenberg	Johannes Krisch	
Ulrich Fugger the Elder	Martin Wuttke	
Matthias Corvinus	Mark Zak	
Kaiser Friedrich III	Tobias Moretti	
Physician	Christian Strasser	Walter von Hauff

== Production ==
The series was filmed in a mix of French and German, with German-speaking actors (such as Niewöhner) speaking German and French-speaking actors (such as Théret) speaking French.

The Austrian ORF broadcast the film immediately after filming, in December 2016, but ZDF waited ten months so that it could be broadcast on 3 October of the next year, the German Unity Day.

The production of the film made use of "55 castles, palaces, cloisters and medieval streets, 3000 extras, 680 horses, 1050 costumes and 450 suits of armours".

== Reception ==
The film has induced some discussions on historicity and the modern images of the main characters.

The German Frankfurter Allgemeine Zeitung criticizes the film for making Mary of Burgundy a proto-feminist character and opines that the viewers should be spared "the smut of a young man between two women", given that the marriage had been planned in details between the two families for a long time (according to historians such as Maximilian's prominent biographer Hermann Wiesflecker though, at this time, the prince was actually in love with the lady-in-waiting Rosina von Kraig, and it was not easy for him to leave or forget her either, although later he did fall in love with Mary). The critic Tilmann P. Gangloff on the other hand praises the film for living up to its title "Game of love and power" and illustrating contemporary politics well, with good hints for modern problems.

The art historian Koen Kleijn finds the movie impressive and wonders why this Austrian-German-Hungarian collaborative project gets broadcast in Finland, Russia, Italy, Denmark, and Spain, but not in the Netherlands where Mary of Burgundy was introduced into the Canon of the Netherlands in 2019, with part of the commission's explanation being cited as "Maria [Mary]'s Habsburg marriage determined the international position of the Netherlands for centuries." (a decision Kleijn is personally against, for "The only demonstrable significance of Mary of Burgundy [...] is that she willingly allowed herself to be married off by her father to an Austrian."; historians' evaluation of her person and reign has remained controversial until this day).

== See also ==
- Cultural depictions of Maximilian I, Holy Roman Emperor
