= Night Fare =

- Directed by: Julien Seri
- Screenplay by: Cyril Ferment; Pascal Sid; Julien Seri
- Story by: Wahid "Tarubi" Mosta
- Produced by: Raphael Cohen; Pascal Sid; Paul Mignot
- Starring: Jonathan Howard; Jonathan Demurger; Fanny Valette; Jess Liaudin
- Cinematography: Jacques Ballard
- Edited by: Nathalie Safir
- Music by: Alex Cortes
- Production company: Daïgoro Films
- Distributed by: Kanibal Films Distribution
- Release dates: 2015; 16 January 2016 (France)
- Running time: 80 minutes
- Country: France
- Languages: English; French
- Budget: €560,000

Night Fare is a 2015 French horror-thriller film directed by Julien Seri. Jonathan Howard and Jonathan Demurger star as friends who antagonize a Paris taxi driver (Jess Liaudin) by not paying the fare. The taxi driver chases them through the city, killing several people who get in his way.

== Plot ==
Englishman Chris returns to Paris after abruptly leaving two years ago. He meets his ex-girlfriend, Ludivine, and friend, Luc, frustrated to learn they are now dating. Luc takes them to a party, where Chris talks to Ludivine. She reminds him that he left without any explanation and says she is over him. Ludivine takes Luc's car when she leaves early. Upset, Chris also leaves the party, and Luc follows him, attempting to persuade him to attend another party. As they drunkenly walk through Paris, Luc suggests they steal a car. Chris refuses and suggests getting a taxi instead. Luc snorts cocaine in the cab, further upsetting Chris. The driver does not react and remains silent during the entire trip, unnerving them. Luc says he needs to get money from an ATM but runs off, laughing. Chris apologetically flees the cab, joining Luc.

Luc reveals he has a large amount of cash on him and refused to pay on a whim. As Chris and Luc argue, the taxi driver stalks them, chasing them down several streets. Eventually, Luc is confronted by several hostile police officers. Though Luc protests they have done nothing wrong, their leader searches them and steals Luc's cash. One policeman declines to accept the money, and the rest split it. After the police leave, Luc and Chris blame each other for the current situation and something that happened two years ago, only for the taxi driver to chase them again. They lead him to an underground car park, where a security guard confronts him. The guard beats his dog when it refuses to attack the driver. Enraged by the man's actions, the driver beats him and rescues the dog.

The driver once again finds them and chases them through Paris. Frustrated and unwilling to go to the police, Luc takes them to Detox, a violent gangster. There, Luc claims that the taxi driver stole his money, which he owes to Detox. When Detox sees the driver outside his house, he leaves with a sword. The driver easily kills him, enters the house, and kills everyone but Chris and Luc, who flee. Finally convinced their danger, Luc calls the police. Chris looks for a street sign to tell them their location, but the driver hits him with the car. Now slowed down, they flee again, only to be stopped by the same policeman who earlier robbed Luc. The police arrest Chris and Luc for the massacre, ignoring their warnings that the driver is nearby. The driver attacks the policemen but spares the life of the one who refused to take Luc's money.

Luc and Chris rescue a wounded officer and flee into a nearby park in his car. After the officer dies, they panic, knowing that they have no witnesses left to implicate the driver. They fight each other to a draw, eventually revealing what happened two years ago: Chris and Luc drunkenly harassed a homeless person, pouring alcohol on him as they mimed urinating. When he fought back, they beat him, accidentally causing him to catch on fire and die. They discuss the possibility that the driver knows about this somehow and is punishing them. Luc receives a call from Ludivine, who says the driver has kidnapped her and brought her to a factory. Luc suggests they abandon her, but Chris refuses. Chris rescues Ludivine but is overpowered by the driver. Luc appears and helps him, but the driver easily overpowers both of them.

Chris begs the driver to leave Ludivine alone. The driver releases her but silently demands that Luc accompany him. Luc, sure that he is to be killed, enters the taxi. He is surprised to be put in a jail cell naked. After an undisclosed amount of time, the driver gives him a book to read that details the history of a secret society of vigilantes that recruits from people who have repented from selfish and violent lives. Overcome by the realization that he, too, has lived a selfish life, Luc agrees to join the driver's secret society. After training with him, the driver drops off Luc in front of a violent mugging, leaving him to stop it himself.

== Cast ==
- Jonathan Howard as Chris
- Jonathan Demurger as Luc
- Fanny Valette as Ludivine
- Jess Liaudin as the driver
- Édouard Montoute as the police officer

== Production ==
The €560,000 budget was raised through a combination of private investors and crowdfunding.

== Release ==
After a festival run, Night Fare opened in France on 16 January 2016.

== Reception ==
On French review aggregator website AlloCiné, Night Fare has an average rating of 2.4/5 stars based on nine reviews. British magazine Starburst rated it 8/10 stars. Their reviewer, Joel Harley, praised the film's twist ending but said it will likely divide audiences. Writing for American horror website Bloody Disgusting, Patrick Cooper called the premise "ripe for excitement" but said the film degenerates into moralizing and has an unbelievable ending. Gareth Jones of Dread Central rated it 5/5 stars and called it one of the best films of the year.

Night Fare won Best Feature Film at the Mile High Horror Film Festival.
