= La très très grande entreprise =

- Directed by: Pierre Jolivet
- Produced by: Charles Gassot and Jacques Hinstin
- Starring: Roschdy Zem; Marie Gillain; Jean-Paul Rouve; Adrien Jolivet; Guilaine Londez
- Cinematography: Pascal Ridao
- Edited by: Yves Deschamps; Charlotte Theillard
- Music by: Manu Katché
- Distributed by: Pathé
- Release date: 5 November 2008
- Running time: 102 minutes
- Country: France
- Language: French
- Budget: $8.6 million
- Box office: $1.6 million

La très très grande entreprise (English title: The Very Very Big Company) is a French comedy film directed by Pierre Jolivet and released in France in November 2008. It is an indirect follow-up to his film Ma petite entreprise, the story of which is set nine years before that of La très très grande entreprise.

== Synopsis ==
Four friends - an oyster-farmer, an accountant's assistant, a restaurateur and a blue-collar worker - decide to take on a multi-national agro-chemical company with a turnover of €9bn and which has been polluting their region on a large scale. Having been awarded a paltry amount of compensation, they decide to seek true justice. They have however just 30 days to uncover vital new evidence ...

== Cast ==
- Roschdy Zem : Zak
- Marie Gillain : Mélanie
- Jean-Paul Rouve : Denis
- Adrien Jolivet : Kevin
- Guilaine Londez : Brigitte Lamarcq
- Arlette Thomas : Mme de Marthod
- Wilfried Romoli : Romolli
- Vikash Dhorasoo : Sanjay
- Nicolas Marié : Lawyer Dessax
- Anne Loiret : Sophie Dantec
- Eric Prat : Boisselier
- Denis Ménochet : Gilles
- Cyril Couton : Philippe Malzieux
- Scali Delpeyrat : Boissy D'Anglas
- Ludovic Bergery : Philippe
- Serge Larivière : M. Andretti
