= Night and Day (1991 film) =

- Directed by: Chantal Akerman
- Written by: Chantal Akerman; Pascal Bonitzer
- Produced by: Martine Marignac; Maurice Tinchant; Marilyn Watelet
- Starring: Guilaine Londez; Thomas Langmann; François Négret
- Cinematography: Jean-Claude Neckelbrouck
- Edited by: Francine Sandberg
- Music by: Marc Hérouet
- Release date: August 28, 1991
- Running time: 92 minutes
- Country: France
- Language: French

Night and Day (French: Nuit et Jour) is a 1991 French drama film directed by Chantal Akerman.

== Plot ==
Jack and Julie live together in Paris. They are a couple who are so in love with one another that they forget the rest of the world. Jack works as a taxi driver by night so he can be with Julie in the day. One day he introduces Julie to Joseph, who is a taxi driver by day. Joseph and Julie fall in love with each other and have an affair afterwards.

== Cast ==
- Guilaine Londez - Julie
- Thomas Langmann - Jack
- François Négret - Joseph
- Nicole Colchat - Jack's mother
- Pierre Laroche - Jack's father
