= Rebecca H. (Return to the Dogs) =

2010 film

- Directed by: Lodge Kerrigan
- Written by: Lodge Kerrigan
- Produced by: Lodge Kerrigan
- Starring: Géraldine Pailhas
- Cinematography: Laurent Brunet; Josée Deshaies
- Edited by: Marion Monnier
- Release date: 20 May 2010
- Running time: 75 minutes
- Countries: France; United States
- Languages: French; English

Rebecca H. (Return to the Dogs) is a 2010 French-American drama film directed by Lodge Kerrigan. It was entered into the Un Certain Regard section of the 2010 Cannes Film Festival.

== Cast ==
- Géraldine Pailhas as Rebecca Herry / Géraldine Pailhas
- Pascal Greggory as Jérôme Herry / Pascal Greggory
- Magali Woch as Passerby (as Magalie Woch)
- Lodge Kerrigan as Director
- Ilan Cohen as Translator
- Paco Boublard as Neighborhood Teenager
- Jérémy Lornac as Neighborhood Teenager
- Louise Szpindel as Neighborhood Teenager
- Nicolas Moreau as Angry Neighbor
- Antoine Régent as Travel Agent
- Aurélien Recoing as Internet Stranger
- Gérard Kuhnl as Murderer (as Gérard Kuhln)
- Valérie Dréville as Detective
- Gérard Watkins as Detective
