= Vive la colo! =

- Created by: Didier Le Pêcheur; Dominique Ladoge
- Starring: Virginie Hocq; Titoff; Jean-Louis Foulquier; Julien Boisselier
- Country of origin: France
- Original language: French
- No. of seasons: 2
- No. of episodes: 12

Production
- Running time: 52 minutes

Original release
- Network: TF1 (France); La Une / RTBF (Belgium); RTS Un (Switzerland)
- Release: 16 April 2012 – 20 May 2013

Vive la colo! is a French television series. It ran from 2012 to 2013 on TF1 (France).

== Plot ==
Morgane Kemener is back in the camp of Spray, because her father Victor was hospitalized and he cannot direct it at the moment. Although the housekeeper, Capucine helped by Monitors; Driss, Edgar, Thiphaine and Loïc, do everything to contain these lovely darlings, there reigns chaos! Morgan then agreed to lead the camp for a week.

== Cast ==
- Virginie Hocq : Morgane Kemener (Season 1&2)
- Titoff : Loïc (Season 1&2)
- Jean-Louis Foulquier : Victor Kemener (Season 1&2)
- Julien Boisselier : Thomas Bonifaci (Season 1&2)

=== Season 1 ===
- Charlotte de Turckheim : Capucine Kabik
- Raphaël Lenglet : Driss
- Mhamed Arezki : Edgar
- Ophélie Bazillou : Tiphaine
- Nicolas Woirion : Manu
- Andréa Ferréol : Yvonne

=== Season 2 ===
- Guilaine Londez : Capucine Kabik
- Catherine Jacob : Rosalie
- Luce : Luna
- Grégory Montel : Boris
- Côme Levin : Hugo
- Augustin Bonhomme : Jimmy
- Mathieu Delarive : Stéphane (Episodes 2-3)
