= Nuts (2012 film) =

- Film poster
- Directed by: Yann Coridian
- Screenplay by: Yann Coridian; Sophie Fillières
- Produced by: Tonie Marshall
- Starring: Éric Elmosnino; Sophie Quinton; Valeria Golino
- Cinematography: Guillaume Deffontaines
- Edited by: Laurence Briaud
- Music by: Lilly Wood and the Prick
- Production company: Tabo Tabo Films
- Distributed by: MK2 Diffusion
- Release dates: 10 October 2012 (Saint-Jean-de-Luz); 27 February 2013
- Running time: 85 minutes
- Country: France
- Language: French

Nuts (French: Ouf) is a 2012 French comedy film directed by Yann Coridian. It stars Éric Elmosnino, Sophie Quinton and Valeria Golino.

== Plot ==
At the age of 41 François seems to be perfectly happy. He is married to his first and only love Anne and together they have two children. When a relatively minor incident triggers a tantrum, François finds himself soon in an asylum for the mentally insane. After his release he is shunned by Anne. Desperate to get Anne back he tries to redeem himself but his parents as well as his best friend are less supportive than he hoped.

== Cast ==
- Éric Elmosnino as François
- Sophie Quinton as Anna
- Valeria Golino as Giovanna
- Luis Rego as François's father
- Evelyne Buyle as François's mother
- Anémone as Dr. Vorov
- Luce as Solveig
- Brigitte Sy as Madame Herschel
- Michaël Abiteboul as François's brother
- Suliane Brahim as Soraya
- Partha Pratim Majumder as Cadress
- Jean-Louis Coulloc'h as Abdel
- Gustave Kervern as Bertrand
- Marie Denarnaud as Anna's friend
- Julie-Anne Roth as The shrink patient

== Production ==
It is the first film directed by Yann Coridian. It is also the debut film of singer Luce.
