= Paulette (film) =

2012 film by Jérôme Enrico

- Directed by: Jérôme Enrico
- Written by: Bianca Olsen; Laurie Aubanel; Jérôme Enrico; Cyril Rambour
- Produced by: Alain Goldman
- Starring: Bernadette Lafont; Carmen Maura; Dominique Lavanant; Françoise Bertin; André Penvern; Axelle Laffont; Paco Boublard; Jean-Baptiste Anoumon; Aymen Saïdi; Ismaël Dramé
- Cinematography: Bruno Privat
- Edited by: Antoine Vareille
- Music by: Michel Ochowiak
- Production company: Gaumont
- Release dates: 4 October 2012 (Festa do Cinema Frances); 16 January 2013 (France)
- Running time: 87 minutes
- Country: France
- Language: French
- Budget: $4.6 million
- Box office: $13.2 million

Paulette is a 2012 French comedy-crime-film directed by Jérôme Enrico. He wrote the script in cooperation with Bianca Olsen, Laurie Aubanel and Cyril Rambour. It has been said the plot was based on true events.

== Plot ==
Paulette and her late husband had a brasserie. Now the xenophobic old lady lives alone in a banlieue and her pension is too small to get along. In the course of a sequestration most of her furniture and also her TV set are seized. Moreover, the landline is cut off because of overdue bills. Paulette is desperate to earn money somehow and she hears there is much money to be made in dealing cannabis. She visits a known criminal named Vito in her area and asks him for work. He commissions her eventually to sell his cannabis. The other dealers don't put up with her unexpected success. They beat her up and rob her. Again, she is desperate because she has to deliver a certain amount of money to Vito. Instead of just distributing sheer cannabis she starts to sell cakes and biscuits spiced with cannabis. Soon there is a huge demand for her elaborate pastries. Vito's boss gets enthusiastic about her success and plans to sell her biscuits to pupils. When she refuses to support this idea, the villain kidnaps Paulette's grandson. She starts a spectacular attempt to free him but in the end it is her son-in-law Ousmane who saves the day. Finally she leaves France and opens a cannabis coffee shop in Amsterdam, hereby becoming the kind of person she used to dislike: an emigrant.

== Cast ==
- Bernadette Lafont as Paulette
- Carmen Maura as Maria
- Dominique Lavanant as Lucienne
- Françoise Bertin as Renée
- André Penvern as Gunther
- Ismaël Dramé as Léo
- Jean-Baptiste Anoumon as Ousmane
- Axelle Laffont as Agnès
- Paco Boublard as Vito
- Aymen Saïdi as Rachid
- Pascal N'Zonzi as Father Baptiste

== Reception ==
Brendan Kelly wrote for Montreal's Gazette and The Vancouver Sun the film had "its highs and lows". Carola Almsinck (kinocritics.com) wrote on the occasion of the German release "Paulette" was a "very French" film and eligible as an "amusing fairytale".

On the review aggregator website Rotten Tomatoes, 71% of 7 critics' reviews are positive, with an average rating of 6.4/10.
