= The Night Watchman (2015 film) =

2015 film by Pierre Jolivet

- Film poster
- Directed by: Pierre Jolivet
- Written by: Pierre Jolivet; Simon Michaël; Simon Moutairou
- Produced by: Gaëtan David; André Logie; Xavier Rigault; Marc-Antoine Robert
- Starring: Olivier Gourmet; Valérie Bonneton; Marc Zinga
- Cinematography: Jérôme Alméras
- Edited by: Yves Deschamps
- Music by: Adrien Jolivet; Sacha Sieff
- Production companies: 2.4.7. Films; France 3 Cinéma; Panache Productions; La Compagnie Cinématographique
- Distributed by: Ad Vitam Distribution (France)
- Release dates: 8 April 2015 (France); 29 April 2015 (Belgium)
- Running time: 95 minutes
- Countries: France; Belgium
- Language: French
- Budget: $4 million
- Box office: $253.000

The Night Watchman (French title: Jamais de la vie) is a 2015 French-Belgian thriller film directed by Pierre Jolivet. The story revolves around Franck, a shopping mall night watchman, who discovers a planned holdup. The movie won the Golden Goblet Award for Best Feature Film at the 2015 Shanghai International Film Festival.

== Cast ==
- Olivier Gourmet as Franck
- Valérie Bonneton as Mylène
- Marc Zinga as Ketu
- Thierry Hancisse as Étienne
- Jean-François Cayrey as Antoine
- Paco Boublard as Le Bouclé
- Nader Boussandel as Ahmed
- Vincent Debost as Denis
- Yassine Douighi as Chad
- Guerassim Dichliev as Algas
- Soufiane Guerrab as Ziad
- Julie Ferrier as Jeanne
- Bénabar as Pedro
