= Zim and Co. =

2005 film

- Directed by: Pierre Jolivet
- Written by: Pierre Jolivet; Simon Michaël
- Produced by: Frédéric Bourboulon
- Starring: Adrien Jolivet
- Cinematography: Jérôme Alméras
- Edited by: Stratos Gabrielidis
- Distributed by: BAC Films
- Release date: 17 August 2005
- Running time: 88 minutes
- Country: France
- Language: French
- Budget: $3.7 million
- Box office: $745,000

Zim and Co. is a 2005 French film directed by Pierre Jolivet.

It was screened in the Un Certain Regard section at the 2005 Cannes Film Festival, the first time a film by Jolivet had been selected. The film won the Grand Prize of the third Festival of European Film in Ljubljana (2008), organized by EUNIC (the European Union of National Institutes for Culture). Adrien Jolivet (son of the director), in his first film, who also co-composed the soundtrack, was nominated for the César Meilleur Espoir Masculin (Most Promising Newcomer) in 2006.

Jolivet described the themes of the film as "those who young people living in suburbs deal with: employment problems, prejudices, racism, violence, lack of sympathy, shady dealings and repression but above all friendship and perseverance". In order to grasp the daily reality of today’s young people, Pierre Jolivet gave an early version of the screenplay to Adrien and his friend Yannick Nasso, two of the main characters of the film to verifty how authentic it was.

== Plot ==
Following an accident where he crashes his motorbike into a car, 20-year-old Zim is arrested; the judge agrees to allow him to avoid jail, if he finds a proper job within a month. The only job he finds, requires a car and driving licence and he has neither. His friends rally to help him out.

== Cast ==
- Adrien Jolivet - Victor Zimbietrovski, called Zim
- Mhamed Arezki - Cheb
- Yannick Nasso - Arthur
- Naidra Ayadi - Safia
- Nathalie Richard - Zim's mother
- Nicolas Marié - M. Rangin
- Maka Kotto - Père Arthur
- Abbes Zahmani - Nourdine
- Jean-Philippe Vidal - Pascal
- Guilaine Londez - The judge
- Vincent Grass - The teacher
- Michelle Goddet - The mother of Cheb
- Nada Strancar - Madame Merceron
- Wilfried Romoli - Will
- Jean-Claude Frissung - The old worker
- Pierre Diot - Sport-In head of personnel
