= Les Bleus (TV series) =

French television series

- Also known as: Les Bleus : premiers pas dans la police
- Genre: Comedy, Action, Drama, Police
- Created by: Stéphane Giusti; Alain Robillard; Alain Tasma
- Starring: Élodie Yung (1–4); Nicolas Gob (1–4); Raphaël Lenglet (1–4); Mhamed Arezki (1–2, 4); Gabrièle Valensi (1–2); Antoine Hamel (3–4); Jina Djemba (3–4); Lizzie Brocheré (4); Patrick Catalifo (1,4); Clémentine Célarié (2-4); Luc Thuillier (1-4); Jean-Michel Fête (1-4); Mathieu Delarive (1-4)
- Country of origin: France
- Original language: French
- No. of series: 4
- No. of episodes: 35

Original release
- Network: M6
- Release: February 8, 2006 – October 16, 2010

Les Bleus : premiers pas dans la police (literally "The Blues: first steps in the police", often shortened to Les Bleus) is a French police television series about five rookie police officers learning the ropes. Episodes center on the young protagonists' amusing attempts to solve and prevent crimes with the help of their seasoned superiors. Though their lack of experience creates many humorous situations, the series is primarily an action-adventure police drama. Most of the action takes place at the Commissariat (Police Station) and on the streets of Paris.

As the story progresses, the rookies form a tight knit group while continuing to develop their outside relationships. Each character has to face his own ethical dilemmas, often having to choose between upholding the law and loyalty to those closest to them.

The series was created by Stéphane Giusti, Alain Robillard and Alain Tasma. It aired from February 8, 2006 until October 16, 2010 on France's M6.

== Characters ==
=== The Rookies (Les Bleus) ===
Character	Portrayed by	# of Episodes	Seasons			
Character	Portrayed by	# of Episodes	1	2	3	4
Laura Maurier	Élodie Yung	29	In all but six episodes of season 4			
Trained as a lawyer but joined the police to meet her father, Commissaire Santamaria. Very driven, practices martial arts.
Lyes Beloumi	Mhamed Arezki	26	Every episode of seasons 1 & 2			Back for S04
A young, accident prone, eager beaver bent on rising quickly through the ranks. Promoted to Commissaire in season 4.
Kévin Laporte	Nicolas Gob	35	In every episode of the entire series	In every episode of the entire series	In every episode of the entire series	In every episode of the entire series
The only gay rookie. Buff, sensitive, and an excellent fighter. His father is a petty criminal who is always in and out of jail.
Nadia Poulain	Gabrièle Valensi	19	Every episode of seasons 1 & 2			
Married mother of two who is really bored of her mundane life.
Alex Moreno	Raphaël Lenglet	35	In every episode of the entire series	In every episode of the entire series	In every episode of the entire series	In every episode of the entire series
Ex-hooligan who still has many ties to the underworld. He must continually choose between his old pals and his responsibility to uphold the law.
Christophe Lecomte	Antoine Hamel	16			In seasons 3 & 4	
Has a passion for taxidermy. Comes from a long line of police officers, including his parents and sister. Does not want to be a cop.
Amy Sidibé	Jina Djemba	16			In seasons 3 & 4	
A single mother who has for a long time pretended that her daughter is her sister.
Elina Volkova	Lizzie Brocheré	6				Last 6 episodes
A young, energetic new recruit who has trouble following orders

=== Non-Rookie Police and Other Supporting Characters ===
Character	Portrayed by	# of Episodes	Seasons			
Character	Portrayed by	# of Episodes	1	2	3	4
Commissaire Daniel Santamaria	Patrick Catalifo	14	All of S01			E02 of S04
Laura Maurier's father, though he does not know it himself at first. Becomes very attached to her when he does find out.
Commissaire Nicole Mercier	Clémentine Célarié	22		In seasons 2-4		
Dedicated but haunted by guilt over the decades ago death of a friend and fellow officer. Sometimes callous towards her officers to the point of putting them in unnecessary danger.
Capitaine Louis Franchard	Luc Thuillier	35	In every episode of the entire show	In every episode of the entire show	In every episode of the entire show	In every episode of the entire show
Becomes like a second father to Kévin after he begins dating his mother. Though the romance doesn't last, he continues to act very protectively towards Kévin.
Capitaine Étienne Duval	Jean-Michel Fête	35	In every episode of the entire show	In every episode of the entire show	In every episode of the entire show	In every episode of the entire show
Loves opera. Blames Commissaire Mercier and himself for the death of their old friend and colleague.
Capitaine Yann Berthier	Mathieu Delarive	23	Semi-regular in every season	Semi-regular in every season	Semi-regular in every season	Semi-regular in every season
A closeted gay police Capitaine at first, he becomes Kévin's lover and in season 4 they are married.

=== Guest ===
- Clara Ponsot as Agathe Sirac
- Emil Abossolo-Mbo as Professor Hassan
- Émilie Gavois-Kahn as Anaïs
- Eric Godon as Artiguste
- François Levantal as Boris Lukacs
- Françoise Bertin as Madame Tubin
- Guillaume Gouix as Marco
- Joseph Malerba as Lieutenant Simoni
- Marie-Christine Adam as Madame Magnard
- Nicolas Marié as Gilbert Mourier
- Olivier Broche as Cyrille Vauquier
- Philippe Laudenbach
- Riton Liebman as The medical examiner
- Samuel Labarthe as Pierre Valenski

== Episodes ==
=== Pilot (2006) ===
1. Pilot (Pilote) 90 minutes

=== First season (2007) ===
1. Collateral Damage (Dommage collatélral)
2. Hard Life (Une vie de chien)
3. Ghost of the Past (Fantôme du passé)
4. Mansions (Hôtels particuliers)
5. Eyes Closed (Les Yeux fermés)
6. Old Flames (Retour de flammes)
7. Hostages (Otages)
8. Pretenses (Faux-semblants)
9. Everything's Wrong (Rien ne va plus)
10. Infiltration (Infiltration)
11. Internal Investigation Part 1 (Enquête interne [1/2])
12. Internal Investigation Part 2 (Enquête interne [2/2])

=== Second season (2009) ===
1. Behind Bars (Derrière les barreaux)
2. Fresh Start (Nouveau depart)
3. Dangerous Games (Jeux dangereux)
4. Abduction Alert (Alerte enlèvement)
5. TBA (Devoir de mémoire)
6. Point Blank (À bout portant)

=== Third season (2010) ===
1. Un voisin encombrant
2. Faillites collectives
3. L'Envers du décor
4. Le Passé retrouvé
5. Amour fou
6. À mains nues
7. La Tentation d'Alex
8. Corps étrangers

=== Fourth season (2010) ===
1. Sur la touche
2. Une affaire de famille
3. Sexe, mensonge et vidéo
4. Un père et manque
5. Bijoux de famille
6. Chambre avec vue
7. 24 heures presque chrono
8. À double tranchant

== Soundtrack ==
=== Theme Song ===
"No Tomorrow" by Orson.

=== Other Songs ===
- "Everywhen" by Massive Attack
- "A Little Bit Strange" by Immersion
- "I can't forgive" by Béatrice Lang
- "Torturé" by Fabrice Aboulker
- "La Nuit Je Mens" by Alain Bashung
  Played in the last scene of season three when Kévin asks Yann to marry him.
  Also played at the end of the last episode of the series as Kévin leaves the force and goes to Mexico.

== Awards ==
Festival du film de télévision de Luchon 2006 :

- Grand Prize for Series
- Best Young Actor : Mhamed Arezki

Festival de la fiction TV de La Rochelle 2007 :

- Best Prime Time Series

== See also ==
- List of French television series
