= Virginie Hocq =

Belgian actress and comedian

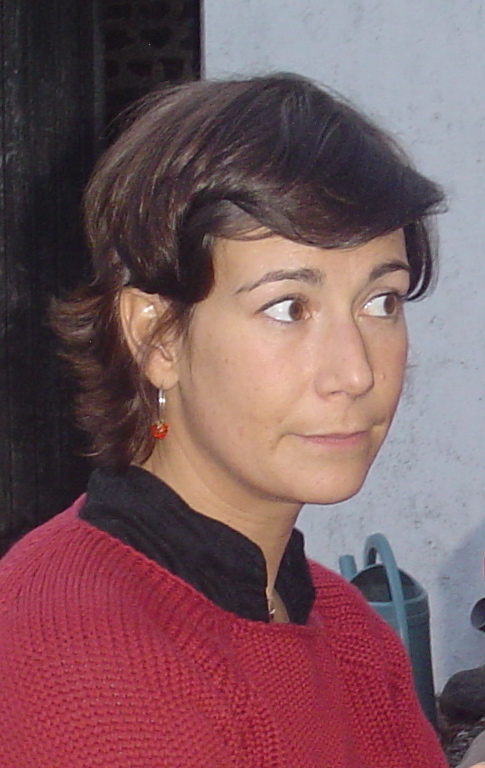
- Virginie Hocq in 2006
- Born: 26 February 1975 (age 51); Nivelles, Belgium
- Occupations: Actress, Comedian
- Years active: 1998–present

Virginie Hocq (born 26 February 1975) is a Belgian actress and comedian.

== Theatre ==
Year	Title	Writer(s)	Director
1998	Les héros de mon enfance	Michel Tremblay	Lucien Binot
1999-2000	Dis oui !	Virginie Hocq & Victor Scheffer	Victor Scheffer
2001	Le Magic Land règle ses Contes	Patrick Chaboud	
2003	Qui a dit faible ?	Virginie Hocq & Patrick Ridremont	Olivier Leborgne
2004	Le Magic Land : erreur de genèse	Patrick Chaboud	
2005-2008	C’est tout moi	Virginie Hocq, Patrick Chaboud & Victor Scheffer	Victor Scheffer
2006-2007	The Vagina Monologues	Eve Ensler	Nathalie Uffner
2009	Les Deux Canards	Tristan Bernard	Alain Sachs
2010-2013	Pas d'inquiétude	Virginie Hocq, Marie-Paule Kumps, Jérôme de Warzée & Marc Donnet-Monay	Marie-Paule Kumps
2014-2016	Sur le fil	Virginie Hocq	Isabelle Nanty
2018	C'était quand la dernière fois ?	Emmanuel Robert-Espalieu	Johanna Boyé
2020	Ou presque	Virginie Hocq	Johanna Boyé
2020	Treize à table	Marc-Gilbert Sauvajon	Pierre Palmade

== Filmography ==
Year	Title	Role	Director	Notes
2003	L'adorable femme des neiges	The pharmacist	Jean-Marc Vervoort	TV movie
2005	The Art of Breaking Up	Emilie	Michel Deville	
2006	Bataille natale	Leïla	Anne Deluz	TV movie
2007	Confidences		Laurent Dussaux	TV mini-series
2009	Bambou	Mylène	Didier Bourdon	
2009	Incognito	Géraldine	Éric Lavaine	
2009	Le séminaire Caméra Café	Clémentine Pozzo	Charles Nemes	
2009	Déformations professionnelles		Benjamin Guedj	TV mini-series
2010	Allez raconte!	Voice	Jean-Christophe Roger	
2010	Le grand restaurant	Pierre's sister	Gérard Pullicino	TV movie
2010	Les toqués	Anne Ronsard	Laurence Katrian	TV series (1 episode)
2011	À dix minutes de nulle part	Station Agent	Arnauld Mercadier	TV movie
2012	Nos chers voisins	Edwige	Denis Thybaud	TV series (1 episode)
2012-2013	Vive la colo !	Morgane Kemener	Stéphane Clavier, Dominique Ladoge, ...	TV series (12 episodes)
2013-2014	Vaugand	Fred	Charlotte Brändström & Manuel Boursinhac	TV series (3 episodes)
2014	La liste de mes envies	Danielle	Didier Le Pêcheur	
2014	Vogue la vie	Raphaëlle	Claire de la Rochefoucauld	TV movie
2015	Presque parfaites	Angèle	Gabriel Julien-Laferrière	TV series (4 episodes)
2016	Arrête ton cinéma	Annabelle	Diane Kurys	
2016	Le mec de la tombe d'à côté	Sophie	Agnès Obadia	TV movie
2017	Le petit Spirou	The school director	Nicolas Bary	
2017	Funcorp	Carole Defays	Benjamin Dessy & Xavier Ziomek	TV series (9 episodes)
2018	Third Wedding (Troisièmes noces)	Jenny	David Lambert	
2018	Murders in the Morvan	Maud Perrin	Simon Astier	TV movie
2019	Someone, Somewhere	The pharmacist	Cédric Klapisch	
TBA	Do You Do You Saint-Tropez		Nicolas Benamou	Completed
TBA	Barbaque		Fabrice Eboué	Filming
