= Alfred Lenglet =

French author

- Born: Caudry, commune of the Nord department in northern France.
- Education: Prytanée national militaire
- Occupations: Chief superintendent, Novelist.
- Parents: Jean-Michel Rémy LENGLET (father); Marie-Louise NORMAND (mother)

Alfred Lenglet (born in 1968, Caudry), is a French chief superintendent and novelist specialised in crime fiction. who grew up in Bertry. He was awarded the Lucien Gachon Prize in 2003 for his book 'The Hollow of Hell' (French: Le Creux de l'Enfer).

== Biography ==
After graduating from the Prytanée national militaire and the Aix-en-Provence military school, he joined the National Police (French: Police nationale) where he became a divisional commissioner, chief superintendent, departmental director of the police forces in France like in Auvergne or Burgundy and 'Head of the Night Service' in Lyon. In 2018, he was appointed professor to the French National Policing School in Saint-Cyr-au-Mont-d'Or. Lenglet holds a master's degree in History writing a thesis on the Parisian police before the First World War convened by Jean-Paul Brunet. His writings reflect his upbringing in northern France impacted by the Great War, his military training and his readings of specific authors such Guy de Maupassant, Ernst Jünger, Marguerite Yourcenar, Henri Bosco, Jean d'Ormesson and Julien Gracq. The recurring character he created is named Léa Ribaucourt, a young policewoman.

== Non-exhaustive bibliography ==
- Lenglet, Alfred (2002). Le Creux de l'Enfer. Limoges: Lucien Souny editions. ISBN 978-2911551734.
- Lenglet, Alfred (2003). Les Écheveaux du destin. Limoges: Lucien Souny editions. ISBN 978-2848860022.
- Lenglet, Alfred (2008). Paradis parfumé. Paris: Joan of Arc editions. ISBN 978-2911794674.
- Lenglet, Alfred (2010). Les Vignes de l'aïeul. Limoges: Lucien Souny editions. ISBN 978-2848863023.
- Lenglet, Alfred (2012). L'Amour dans l'ombre. Limoges: Lucien Souny editions. ISBN 978-2848867144.
- Lenglet, Alfred (2014). Le Médecin des hautes terres. Paris: Souny pocket editions. ISBN 978-2848864563.
- Lenglet, Alfred (2015). Les Vieux Amants du plateau. Limoges: Lucien Souny editions. ISBN 978-2848865188.
- Lenglet, Alfred (2015). Du poison dans les veines : Une enquête de Léa Ribaucourt. Paris: Calmann-Lévy. ISBN 978-2253086178.
- Lenglet, Alfred (2016). Jeux mortels en hiver. Paris: Calmann-Lévy. ISBN 978-2-7021-5799-2.
- Lenglet, Alfred (2017). Temps de haine. Paris: Calmann-Lévy. ISBN 978-2702159606.
- Lenglet, Alfred (2018). Coeurs de glace : Une enquête de Léa Ribaucourt. Paris: Calmann-Lévy. ISBN 9782702161487.

== Personal life ==
Lenglet had four children with Nathalie Vrech named Erwin, Nils, Nanncy and Mancia.
