= Grey Souls =

2005 French drama war film

- Theatrical release poster
- Directed by: Yves Angelo
- Written by: Yves Angelo; Philippe Claudel
- Based on: Les Âmes grises by Philippe Claudel
- Produced by: Frédéric Brillion; Gilles Legrand
- Starring: Jean-Pierre Marielle; Jacques Villeret; Marina Hands; Denis Podalydès
- Cinematography: Jérôme Alméras; Yves Vandermeeren
- Edited by: Thierry Derocles
- Music by: Joanna Bruzdowicz
- Production companies: Epithète Films; France 2 Cinéma
- Distributed by: Warner Bros. Pictures
- Release date: 28 September 2005
- Running time: 106 minutes
- Country: France
- Language: French
- Budget: €5.3 million
- Box office: $2.9 million

Grey Souls (French: Les Âmes grises) is a 2005 French drama war film directed by Yves Angelo, based on the 2003 novel by Philippe Claudel.

== Cast ==
- Jean-Pierre Marielle as Pierre-Ange Destinat
- Jacques Villeret as Mierck
- Marina Hands as Lysia Verhareine
- Denis Podalydès as Aimé Lafaille
