= Fanny Valette =

French actress (born 1986)

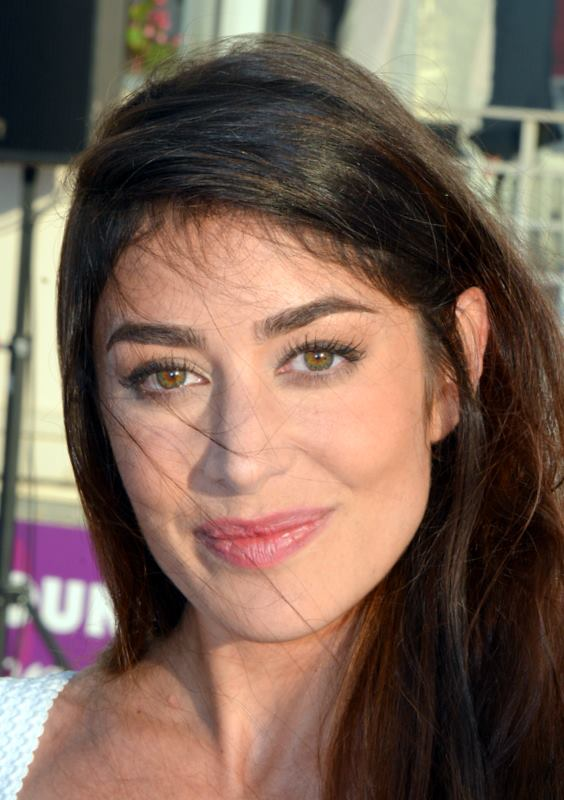
- Fanny Valette in 2017
- Born: 4 July 1986 (age 38); Arles, Bouches-du-Rhône, France
- Occupation: Actress
- Years active: 1992–present

Fanny Valette (born 4 July 1986) is a French actress.

In January 2011 she parodied herself in the video to Max Boublil's comic song J'aime les moches ("I like ugly girls").

== Life and career ==
Valette started her career in an episode of L'instit. In 2005, she was critically praised for her role in Little Jerusalem, for which she won the Lumière Award for Most Promising Actress.

== Filmography ==
=== Film ===
- 1999 : Le fils du Français, by Gérard Lauzier
- 2005 : La Petite Jérusalem, by Karin Albou
- 2006 : Changement d'adresse, by Emmanuel Mouret
- 2007 : Molière, by Laurent Tirard
- 2008 : Sur ta joue ennemie, by Jean-Xavier de Lestrade
- 2009 : La Loi de Murphy, by Christophe Campos
- 2009 : Vertige, by Abel Ferry high lane
- 2010 : Je ne vous oublierai jamais, by Pascal Kané
- 2015 : Night Fare, by Julien Seri
- 2017 : Mr. Stein Goes Online, by Stéphane Robelin

=== Television ===
- 1995 : Une famille pour deux
- 1996 : L'instit (Demain dès l'aube)
- 1997 : La Famille Sapajou
- 1997 : Les Filles du maître de chai
- 1998 : Les Rives du paradis
- 1998 : Un mois de réflexion
- 1998 : Tous les papas ne font pas pipi debout
- 2002 : Justice de femme
- 2003 : Marylin et ses enfants
- 2006 : L'Avare
- 2009 : Une aventure New-Yorkaise
- 2010 : Le Pas Petit Poucet
- 2010 : Sable noir (In memoriam)
- 2011 : L'Épervier
- 2012 : La main passe, by Thierry Petit
- 2014 : Engrenages (UK: Spiral)

== Awards and nominations ==
- 2006: Lumière Award for Most Promising Actress
- 2006: César Awards, nominated for Most Promising Actress (Meilleur jeune espoir féminin)
- 2006: Étoiles d'Or, won for Best Female Newcomer (La révélation féminine)
