= Mathieu Boogaerts =

French singer-songwriter

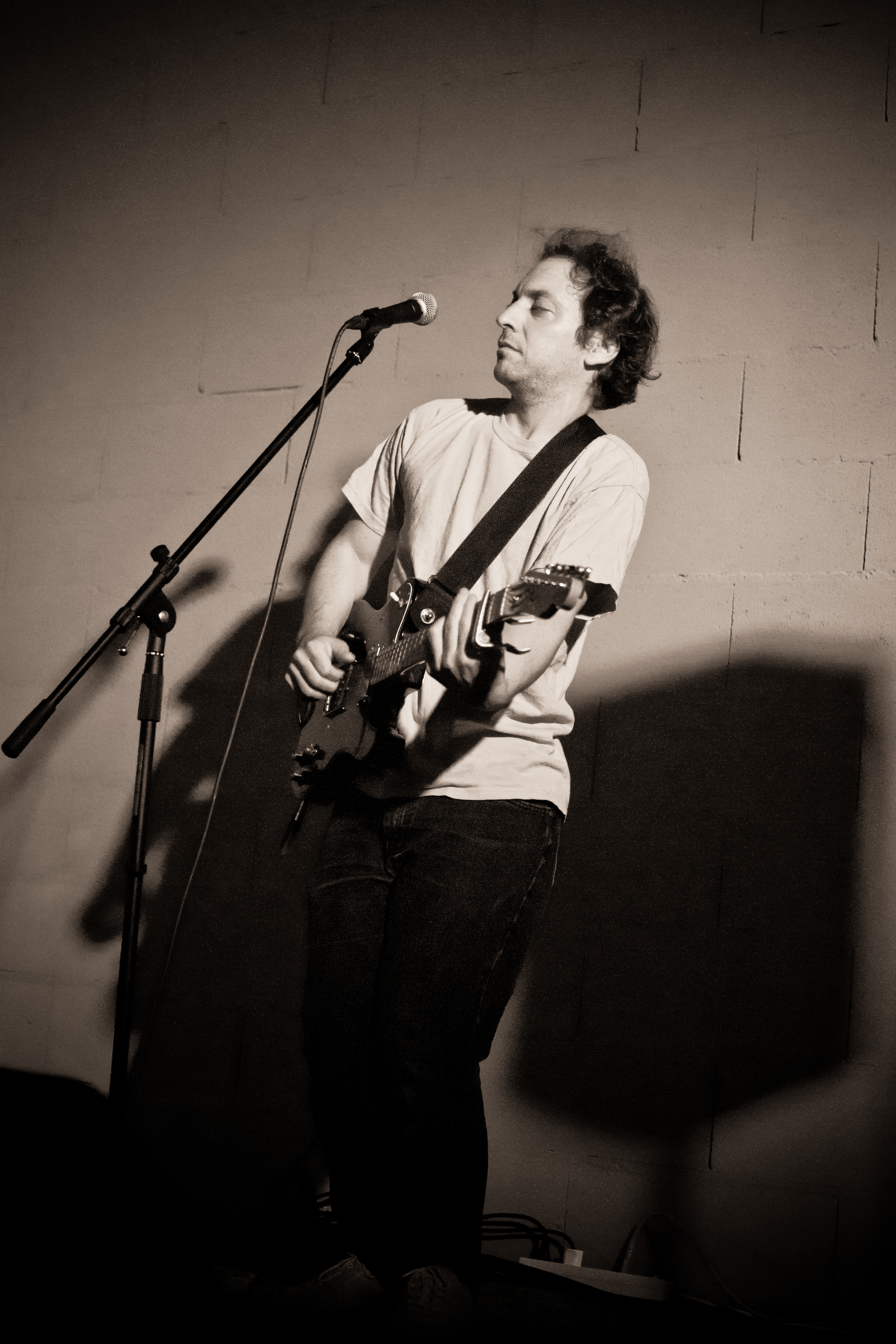
Mathieu Boogaerts in La Datcha, Lausanne, 2011

Mathieu Boogaerts (born 1970) is a French singer-songwriter.

== Biography ==
The son of a pharmacist mother and antiquarian father, Mathieu was born in Fontenay-sous-Bois, where he spent his early childhood before acquainting himself with the piano. At age ten he started playing an organ intended for use by his mother, who never picked it up. After two years of taking courses, he started his first musical group at age 13 with two fellow students and friends from middle school.
After many years travelling the world, mostly Africa (especially Kenya), he started penning some naive, minimalistic ditties.
His sketchy, intimate sound sometimes mixes African rhythms with reggae, and his influences such as the Dutch singer Dick Annegarn, with whom he toured in 1997.

His album Michel is accompanied by an amateur film made by Boogaerts himself.

His music is known for its laid-back style and many of his songs include a very light and delicate drum beat.

== Discography ==
- 1996 – Super
- 1998 – J'en Ai Marre d'Être Deux
- 1999 – Mathieu Boogaerts en Public (Recorded over 2 days: 11 and 12 September 1999)
- 2002 – 2000
- 2003 – DVD 2002 en concert solo
- 2005 – Michel
- 2008 – I Love You
- 2012 – Mathieu Boogaerts
- 2016 – Promeneur
- 2021 - En Anglais
- 2025 - Grand piano

== Other releases ==
- 2005 – Plutôt tôt – Plutôt tard (Double CD by artists on the Tôt ou tard label), songs Demain demain with JP Nataf and Bombes 2 Bal, Na na na with Vincent Delerm, Les aspres with Dick Annegarn
- 2006 – Le Grand Dîner (Tribute album for Dick Annegarn, with songs Les tchèques, and Bébé éléphant (duet with -M-)
