= Little Jerusalem (film) =

- Theatrical poster
- Directed by: Karin Albou
- Written by: Karin Albou
- Produced by: Laurent Lavolé; Isabelle Pragier
- Starring: Fanny Valette; Elsa Zylberstein
- Cinematography: Laurent Brunet
- Edited by: Christiane Lack
- Music by: Cyril Morin
- Distributed by: Océan Films
- Release date: 16 May 2005
- Running time: 96 minutes
- Country: France
- Languages: French, Hebrew, Arabic
- Budget: $1.3 million
- Box office: $1.2 million

Little Jerusalem (French: La Petite Jérusalem) is a 2005 French drama film directed by Karin Albou. Albou's film depicts how the conflict between the rational and the irrational drives the relationships within a Jewish family living in the outskirts of Paris.

== Plot ==
Laura, (Fanny Valette), is a young orthodox Jewish philosophy student who lives with her older sister Mathilde (Elsa Zylberstein), Mathilde's husband Ariel, their four children and her Tunisian mother in an apartment on the outskirts of Paris. Despite her mother's attempts to marry her off Laura is devoted to Kantian reasoning and has decided to live a life based on rules with no room for love. Feeling confined by her brother-in-law Laura dreams of getting an apartment in the centre of Paris.

Mathilde meanwhile is happy with her life until she discovers a hair on her husband's coat. After she confronts him he admits he has been having an affair. Mathilde decides to divorce him and tells Laura who angrily asks Ariel how he could cheat on his wife. He reveals that he is unhappy with their sex life but does not want to suggest that they do anything differently for fear of offending his modest wife.

Mathilde goes to see a woman at the mikveh, who helps to instruct her in what the Torah says regarding sexual relations and how she can pleasure her husband. Mathilde reveals that she does not feel desire towards her husband but slowly, over time she begins to reconnect with her husband sexually.

Laura on the other hand begins to develop passionate feelings for Djamel, a Muslim Algerian man who works at the religious centre where Laura also helps to clean up. Despite telling Djamel that she cannot be in a relationship with him, Laura falls deeply in love with him. When Djamel takes her to meet his family his parents are upset to learn that Laura is Jewish and tell him that she will need to convert to Islam if the couple want to be wed. Knowing that he cannot survive without the financial assistance of his family and not wanting Laura to convert, Djamel breaks off their relationship. Devastated, Laura tries to commit suicide using Mathilde's sleeping pills but is found and rescued in time by her brother-in-law Ariel.

After being the victim of a hate crime Ariel decides to move the family to Israel. Laura's mother decides to move with them but gives Laura the ring she smuggled out of Tunisia so that Laura might sell it and stay in Paris.

== Cast ==
- Fanny Valette as Laura
- Elsa Zylberstein as Mathilde, Laura's sister
- Bruno Todeschini as Ariel, Mathilde's husband
- Hédi Tillette de Clermont-Tonerre as Djamel
- Sonia Tahar as the mother of Laura and Mathilde
- Michaël Cohen as Eric, student friend of Laura
- Aurore Clément as the woman at the mikva
- François Marthouret as the philosophy professor
- Saïda Bekkouche as Djamel's aunt
- Salah Teskouk as Djamel's uncle

== Release ==
The film debuted at the 2005 Cannes Film Festival in the International Critics' Week. Despite being Albou's first feature film Albou was disqualified from competing for the Camera d'Or, awarded to the best first film playing at the festival, because she had previously directed a made-for-TV movie.

Lead actress Fanny Valette won the Most Promising Actress award at the 11th Lumière Awards. She was also nominated in the same category at the 31st César Awards. Director Karin Albou was also nominated for the César Award for Best First Feature Film.
