= Raphaël Lenglet =

French actor

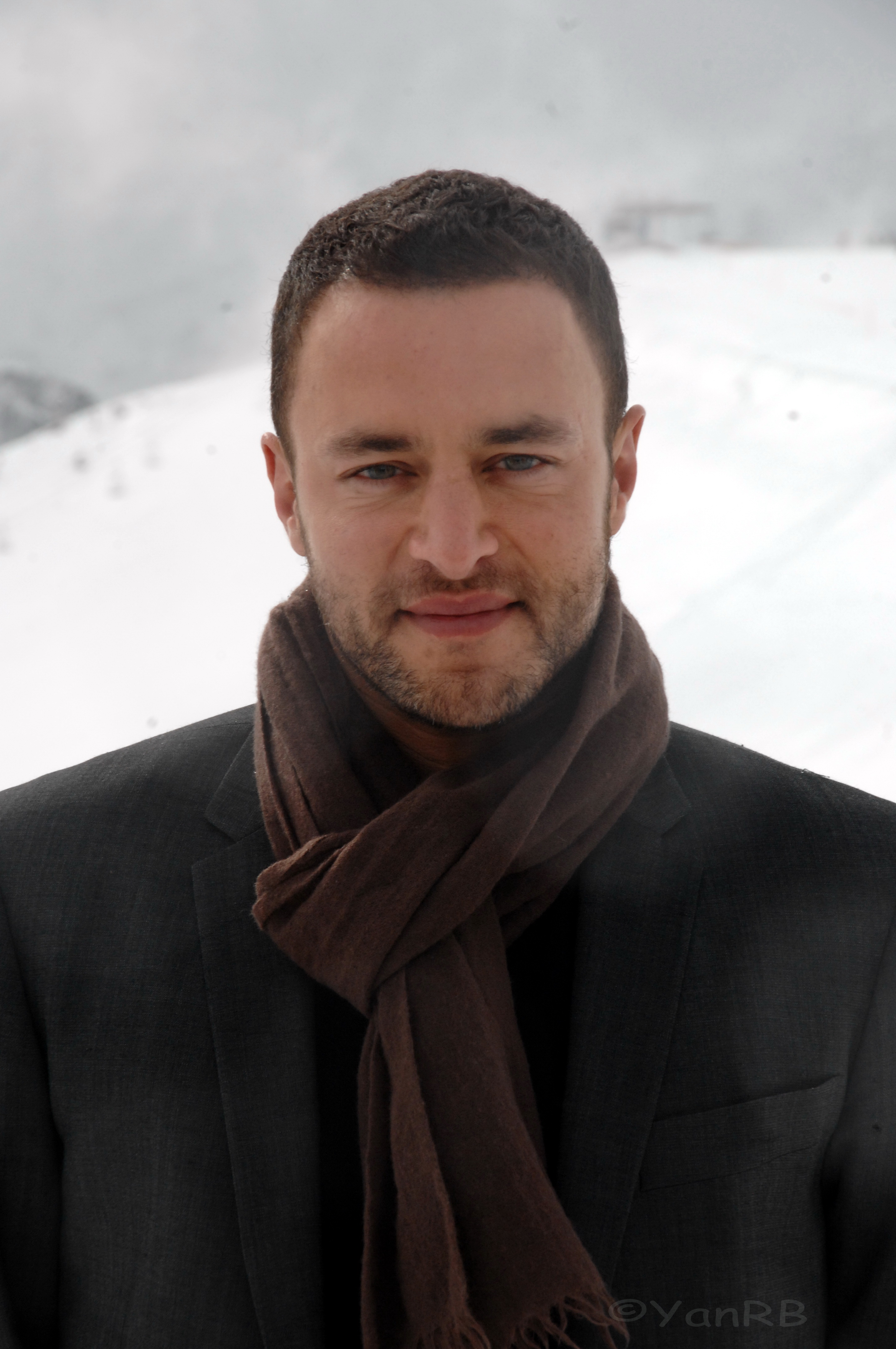
- Lenglet in 2014
- Born: 21 October 1976 (age 49); Metz, France
- Occupation: Actor
- Years active: 2000–present
- Known for: Les Bleus: premiers pas dans la police Candice Renoir; High Lane

Raphaël Lenglet (born 21 October 1976) is a French actor. He is best known for his starring roles in French police television series. On Les Bleus he plays small-time hood turned rookie policeman, Alex Moreno and on Candice Renoir he portrays Capitaine Antoine Dumas. He is also known for his starring role as Guillaume in the 2009 French horror film, High Lane.

== Biography ==
Raphaël Lenglet grew up in the former Picardy region before leaving, at the age of 19, to take theater classes in Paris. He first entered the public eye as a result of his starring role in the series Les Bleus (2006–2010). Since 2013, he has played the recurring role of Captain Dumas alongside Cécile Bois in the police drama Candice Renoir on France 2.

== Theater ==
Year	Title	Director	Writer	Notes
2007	Les Couteaux dans le dos	Pierre Notte	Emmanuelle Bougerol	
2008	Open Bed	David Serrano (adapted by Laurent Ruquier)	Charlotte de Turckheim	Théâtre des Bouffes-Parisiens

== Filmography ==
Year	Title	Role	Director	Notes
2000	Là-bas...mon pays	Young Issam	Alexandre Arcady	TV movie (drame)
2002	Génération start-up		Arnaud Sélignac	TV movie
2002	P.J.	Un bleu	John Guillermin	TV series 1997-2009 (13 seasons, 146 episodes)
2003	Caméra Café	Dimitri Kovalski	Francis Duquet	TV series 2001-2004 (700 episodes)
2003	Les Marins perdus		Claire Devers	TV movie
2004	Central nuit	Mario	Various	TV series 2001-2009 (7 seasons, 43 episodes)
2006	L'État de Grace	Lionel	Pascal Chaumeil	TV mini-series (6 episodes)
2006-2010	Les Bleus	Alex Moreno	Various	TV series (4 seasons, 35 episodes)
2007	J'ai plein de projets		Karim Adda	mini TV movie
2008	Home Sweet Home	Ladrun	Didier Le Pêcheur	TV movie
2008	Open Bed	Nicolas	Richard Valverde	TV movie
2009	High Lane (fr. "Vertige")	Guillaume	Abel Ferry	TV movie
2011	10 jours pour s'aimer	Greg	Christophe Douchand	TV movie
2011	Ni vu, ni connu	Florian Camus	Christophe Douchand	TV movie
2011	Le sang de la vigne	Gautier	Marc Rivière	TV series (13 seasons, 146 episodes)
2012	Mince alors!	Yussuf	Charlotte de Turckheim	TV movie
2012	Vive la colo !	Driss	Dominique Ladoge & Didier Le Pêcheur (2)	TV series (2 seasons, 12 episodes)
2013–2023	Candice Renoir	Antoine Dumas	Pascal Lahmani, Nicolas Picard-Dreyfuss, Raphaël Lenglet, Olivier Barma, Sylvie Ayme, Adeline Darraux, Christophe Douchand, David Ferrier, Olivier Laneurie, Christelle Raynal	TV series (10 seasons)
2014	La liste de mes envies	Hervé Meunier	Didier Le Pêcheur	TV movie
2016	Elle	Ralph	Paul Verhoeven	TV movie
2017	Maximilian (miniseries)	Olivier de la Marche	Andreas Prochaska	TV mini-series (6 episodes)
2019	Les Ombres rouges	Frédéric Garnier	Christophe Douchand	TV mini-series (6 episodes)
