= Karin Albou =

French writer

- Born: March 12, 1968 (age 58); Neuilly-sur-Seine
- Occupations: Director, writer, editor, producer and actress
- Notable work: The Wedding Song

Karin Albou is a French-Algerian female director, writer, editor, producer and actress.

== Early life ==
Karin Albou was born on March 12, 1968 in Neuilly-sur-Seine. Her mother was only 16 when she was born.

In 1999 she moved to Tunisia. A year later, she returned to Paris and started her career as a filmmaker and as a writer.

As a child, Albou was always involved with dance and singing. After high school, Karin continued to study dance, but also studied literature and drama, eventually enrolling in a film school in Paris. She studied screenwriting but discovered she wanted to be a director while taking classes at École Supérieure de Réalisation Audiovisuelle. After graduating, she released her first short film, Hush!.

== Career ==
Albou made her feature film debut in 2005 with Little Jerusalem, which debuted in the International Critics' Week section at the 2005 Cannes Film Festival. Despite being Albou's first feature film, she was disqualified from competing for the Camera d'Or, awarded to the best first film playing at the festival, because she had previously directed a made-for-TV movie.

In 2008 Albou released her second feature film The Wedding Song, a Holocaust drama set in Tunisia in 1942 that was loosely inspired by letters Albou's paternal grandmother had sent to her husband during the war when he was sent to a labour camp. The film played multiple Jewish festivals but failed to garner mainstream attention, something Albou attributed to the many scenes of graphic nudity in the film. Albou's third feature film My Shortest Love Affair, which she co-starred in, was released in 2015.

== Styles and themes ==
Karin's heritage explains some of the themes she chooses to cover. Raised in the Jewish faith, Karin's films explore the lasting trauma of the Holocaust – French colonialism, secret identity, exile, assimilation, and double diaspora.

The director also explores and challenges the rules of religion and marriage and the themes of love, sex and family values. Her themes involve bringing intimate scenes of female spaces, tackling sexual dysfunction in marriage and uncovering how culture impacts the idea of romance. Karin keeps these themes consistent in her films and portrays them with her unique film style. Her style focuses on the representation of women. In The Wedding Song, the film style displays a lesbian, female, and Orientalist gaze.

== Partial filmography ==
=== As director ===
==== Feature films ====
- Little Jerusalem (2005)
- The Wedding Song (2008)
- My Shortest Love Affair (2015)

==== Short films ====
- Hush! (Chut!) (1992)
- Id El Kébir (1998)
- The Innocent (L’Innocent) (2001 TV short)
- Lady's Body (Corps de dame) (2009 TV short)
- Yasmine and the revolution ( 2011)

==== Documentary films ====
- My Country Left Me (1994)
- Tunisian Autumn (2014)

=== As actress ===
==== Feature films ====
- My Shortest Love Affair (dir. Karin Albou)
- The Wedding Song (dir Karin Albou)

==== Short films ====
- Corps de dame

== Awards, nominations, and festival screenings ==
Year	Award	Category	Film	Result
1992	Cinécinéma	Best First Film	Chut	Won
1999	Clermont - Ferrand International Short Film Festival	Best Short for National Film Competition	Aïd El Kebir	Won
2005	Beirut International Film Festival (BIFF)	Best Feature	Little Jerusalem	Won
2005	Crit Week at Cannes Film Festival	Best Screenplay	Little Jerusalem	Won
2005	Crit Week at Cannes Film Festival	Best Feature	Little Jerusalem	Nominated
2005	Deauville Festival	Michel d'Ornano Award	Little Jerusalem	Won
2006	Cesar Awards	Best First Film	Little Jerusalem	Nominated
2006	Cesar Awards	French Academy Cesar	Little Jerusalem	Nominated
2007	Cesar Awards	Best First Film	Little Jerusalem	Nominated
2007	Jewish Film Festival Berlin	-	Little Jerusalem	Screened
2008	Young Directors Festival of Saint-Jean-De-Luz	Public Prize	The Wedding Song	Won
2008	Montpellier Mediterranean Film Festival	Special Mention of the Jury	The Wedding Song	Won
2009	New York Jewish Film Festival	-	The Wedding Song	Screened
2009	Seattle International Film Festival	-	The Wedding Song	Screened
2012	International Images Film Festival, Harare	Best Film	The Wedding Song	Won
2012	International Images Film Festival, Harare	Best Depiction	The Wedding Song	Won
2012	International Images Film Festival, Harare	Best Director	The Wedding Song	Won

The Wedding Song was nominated for 6 awards at the 10th edition of the International Images Film Festival, Harare

== Bibliography ==
- Albou, Karin (2010). La Grande Fête (in French). ISBN 978-2-7427-9295-5. OCLC 658003771.

== See also ==
- List of female film and television directors
