= Pierre Jolivet =

French director, actor, screenwriter and producer

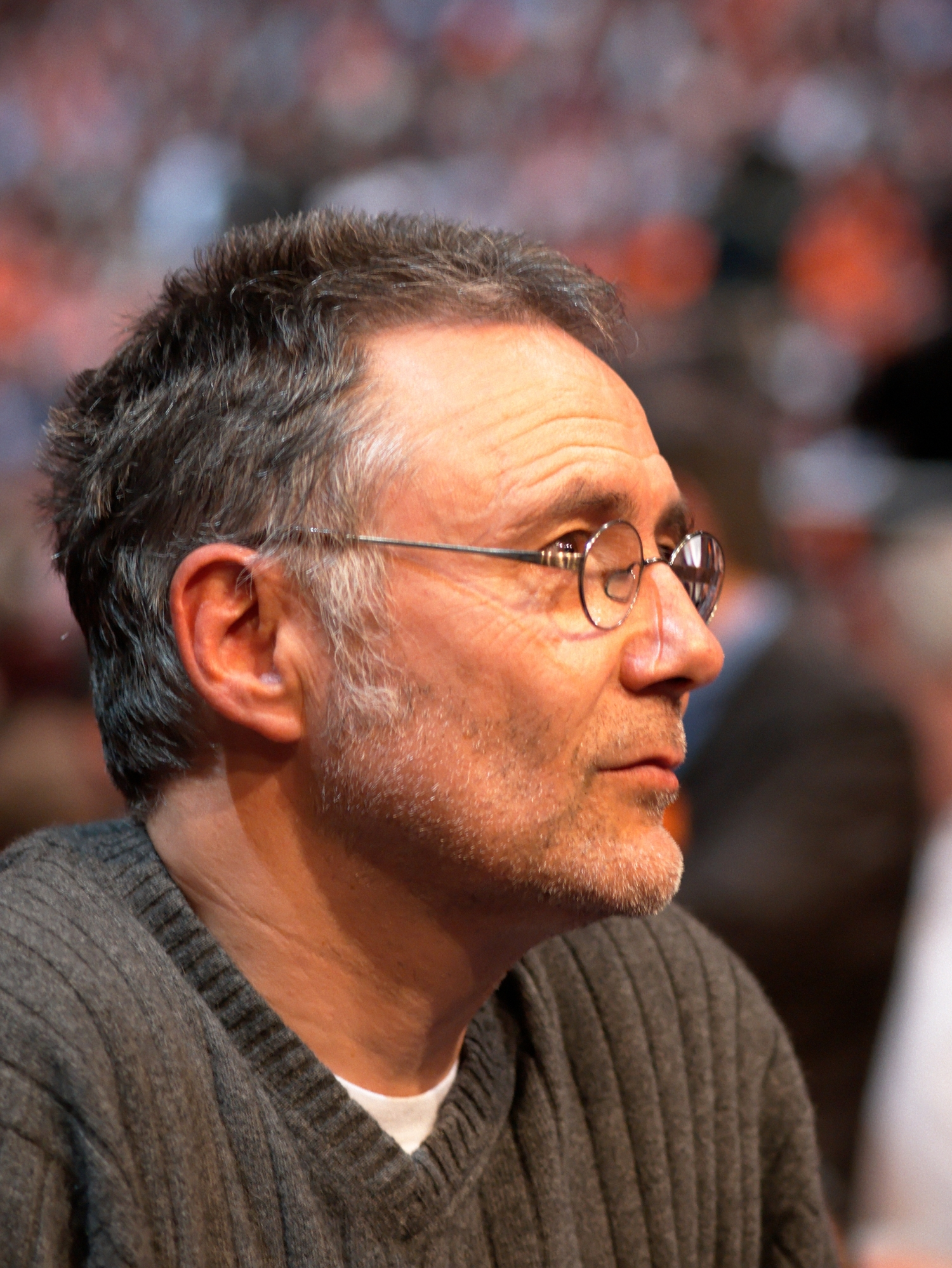
- Pierre Jolivet in 2007
- Born: 9 October 1952 (age 72); Saint-Mandé, France
- Occupation(s): Film director, Screenwriter, Actor, Producer
- Years active: 1958–present

Pierre Jolivet (French: [pjɛʁ ʒɔlivɛ]; born 9 October 1952) is a French director, actor, screenwriter, and producer. His film Zim and Co. was screened in the Un Certain Regard section at the 2005 Cannes Film Festival and his film The Night Watchman won the Golden Goblet Award for Best Feature Film in 2015.

His brother is Marc Jolivet, the actor, script-writer, director, and humourist. They are the sons of Jacques Jolivet (author), and Arlette Thomas, the French voice of the cartoon characters Calimero and Titi (Tweety).

== Selected filmography ==
- Le Dernier Combat (1983)
- Strictement personnel (1985)
- Force majeure (1989)
- A Mere Mortal (Simple mortel) (1991)
- Fortune Express (1991)
- À l'heure où les grands fauves vont boire (1993)
- Fred (1997)
- En plein cœur (1998)
- My Little Business (1999)
- Mon Idole (2002)
- Le Frère du Guerrier (2002)
- Filles uniques (2003)
- Zim and Co. (2005)
- Je crois que je l'aime (2007)
- La très très grande entreprise (2008)
- The Night Watchman (2015)
- Les hommes du feu (2017)
