= Armelle =

French actress (born 1969)

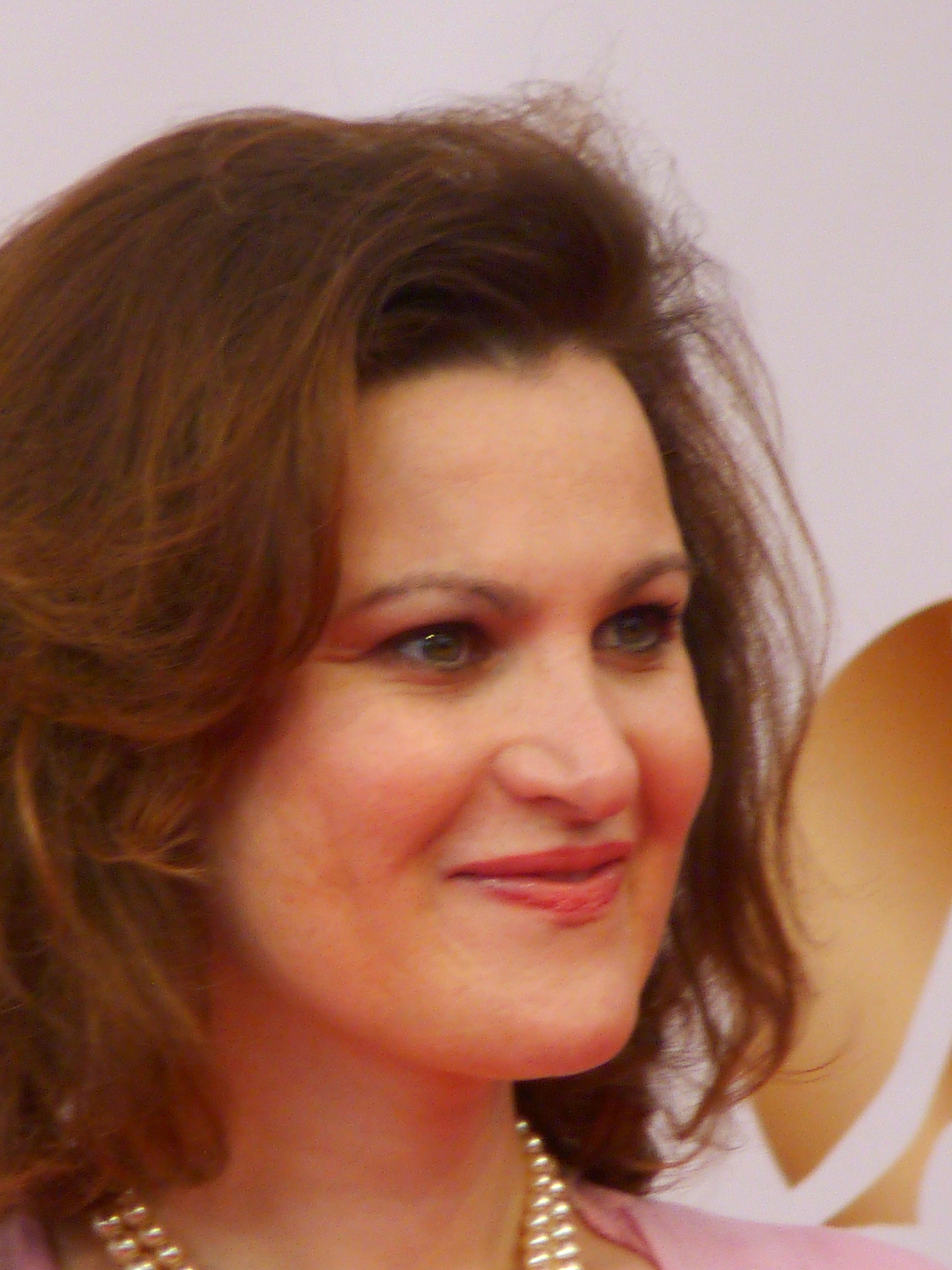
- Armelle at the Monte-Carlo Television Festival
- Born: Armelle Leśniak; 23 July 1969 (age 57); Reims, France
- Occupations: Actress, comedian, screenwriter
- Years active: 1994–present

Armelle Leśniak (born 23 July 1969), known mononymously as Armelle, is a French actress, comedian, and screenwriter.

== Life and career ==
After studies in Khâgne, she works as a costume-aid. Trained by Jean Périmony, her atypical physique and her personality do not take long to attract attention. Coline Serreau entrusted her with a second role in 1996 in La Belle Verte.

In 2001, she plays Maéva Capucin, the head of archives stuck in Caméra Café that she will also play in the cinema in Espace Détente and in Le Séminaire. The same year, she plays in Amélie of Jean-Pierre Jeunet. In 2003, at the 8th edition of the Grand Prix of humor in advertising, she received the Actress Award for her performance in advertising Spontex. In 2011 she plays in La Croisière of Pascale Pouzadoux.

== Theatre ==
Year	Title	Author	Director	Notes
1996–98	L'Audition	Armelle, Rodolphe Sand & David Talbot	Rodolphe Sand	
2005	Le Voyage en Armélie	Armelle	Rodolphe Sand (2)	Théâtre de la Gaîté-Montparnasse
2011	Parce que je la vole bien !	Laurent Ruquier	Jean-Luc Moreau	Théâtre Saint-Georges
2012–14	Mais n'te promène donc pas toute nue	Georges Feydeau	Xavier Viton & Nicolas Delas	Tour
2014-16	Nelson	Jean-Robert Charrier	Olivier Macé & Jean-Pierre Dravel	Théâtre de la Porte Saint-Martin & Tour
2017-19	Une heure avec Maria Callas	Nicolas Delas	Olivier Macé & Jean-Pierre Dravel	Tour
2018-19	Quelle famille !	Francis Joffo	Xavier Viton	Tour

== Filmography ==
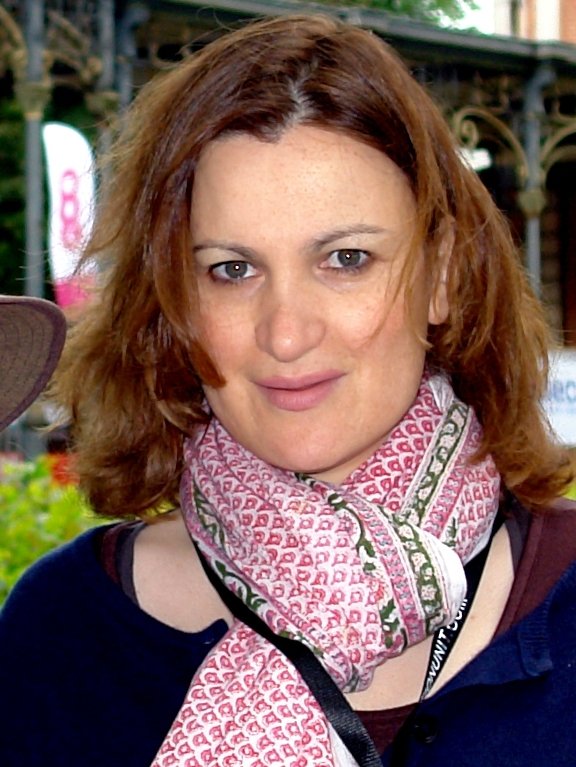
Armelle in 2012

=== Feature films ===
Year	Title	Role	Director	Notes
1994	Grand brun aux yeux doux		Pascale Pouzadoux	Short film
1995	Les Anges gardiens	A Nurse	Jean-Marie Poiré	
1996	La Belle Verte	DDASS's Agent	Coline Serreau	
1997	Arlette	Lucie	Claude Zidi	
1998	The Visitors II: The Corridors of Time	Pétronille	Jean-Marie Poiré	
1998	Bimboland	Nathalie	Ariel Zeitoun	
1999	The Dilettante	The Judge	Pascal Thomas	
1999	L'Âme sœur	Mme Blaireau	Jean-Marie Bigard	
2000	Jet Set	Frénégonde	Fabien Onteniente	
2000	Six-Pack	Court clerk	Alain Berberian	
2000	Le Sens des affaires	Olga	Guy-Philippe Bertin	
2001	Day Off	Marie-Thérèse	Pascal Thomas	
2001	Amélie	Philomène	Jean-Pierre Jeunet	
2001	Absolutely Fabulous	Cerise	Gabriel Aghion	
2002	Sexes très opposés	The Lawyer	Éric Assous	
2003	Toutes les filles sont folles	The Journalist	Pascale Pouzadoux	
2004	San-Antonio	Célestine Fitting	Frédéric Auburtin	
2004	Podium	Laure	Yann Moix	
2004	Before		Nicolas Bary	Short film
2005	Espace Détente	Maéva Capucin	Bruno Solo & Yvan Le Bolloc'h	
2006	Les Aristos	Marie-Karoline	Charlotte de Turckheim	
2007	Jean de la Fontaine, le défi	Mlle Léotot	Daniel Vigne	
2008	Trouble at Timpetill	Teacher Corbac	Nicolas Bary	
2008	De l'autre côté du lit	School's director	Pascale Pouzadoux	
2008	Fool Moon	Maïté	Jérôme L'Hotsky	
2009	Le Séminaire	Maeva Capucin	Charles Némès	
2009	Neuilly Yo Mama!	Mme Blanchet	Gabriel Julien-Laferrière	
2010	The Round Up	School Nurses's Director	Roselyne Bosch	
2010	Fatal	Heidi	Michaël Youn	
2011	La Croisière	Marie-Do	Pascale Pouzadoux	
2012	Porn in the Hood	Libertine orgy's organizer	Franck Gastambide	
2013	Paris à tout prix	Rita	Reem Kherici	
2013	Sacré Charlemagne	The English teacher	Adrien François	Short film
2014	Le Grimoire d'Arkandias	Julie Boucher	Alexandre Castagnetti & Julien Simonet	
2015	Un village presque parfait	Josiane	Stéphane Meunier	
2015	The Final Lesson	The Nurse	Pascale Pouzadoux	
2017	Le Petit Spirou	The Seer	Nicolas Bary	
2020	How to Be a Good Wife	Christiane Rougemont	Martin Provost	

=== Television ===
Year	Title	Role	Director	Notes
1999–2001	Un gars, une fille	Several roles	Isabelle Camus & Hélène Jacques	TV series
2001	Maigret	Nurse	Isabelle Camus & Hélène Jacques	TV series - Season 4 Episode Le Fou de Bergerac
2001-2003	Caméra Café	Maéva Capucin	Bruno Solo & Yvan Le Bolloc'h	TV series
2002	La mort est rousse	Diane	Christian Faure	TV movie
2004	Bien dégagé derrière les oreilles	Jacqueline Palvade	Anne Deluz	TV movie
2005	Mes parents chéris	Rita	Philomène Esposito	TV movie
2006	Mariage surprise		Arnaud Sélignac	TV movie
2007	Un amour de fantôme	Joséphine	Arnaud Sélignac	TV movie
2009	Les Dalton	The mother of the penitentiary's director (Voice)		Animated Series; Episode Maman j'ai raté l’évasion
2011	L'Épervier	Prima Dona	Stéphane Clavier	TV series
2011	Gérald K. Gérald	Martine Moisset	Élisabeth Rappeneau	TV movie
2011	La Nouvelle Blanche-Neige	The Director	Laurent Bénégui	TV movie
2012	Les Voies impénétrables	Nun Caroline	Noémie Saglio & Maxime Govare	TV movie
2012	Scènes de ménages	Nanny of Chloe, the daughter of Emma and Fabien	Élisabeth Rappeneau	Guest
2013	Myster Mocky présente			Episode La main du destin
2013	Y'a pas d'âge	Cornélia		Guest
2014	La Voyante	Mme Rose	Henri Helman	TV movie

== Decorations ==
- Chevalier of the Order of Arts and Letters (2017)
