= Danièle Mazet-Delpeuch =

French chef (1942–2024)

Danièle Mazet-Delpeuch (1942 – 30 September 2024) was a French chef perhaps best known for her stint as the first female chef for the President of France.

== Culinary career ==
From the 1970s, Mazet-Delpeuch was a culinary teacher, and was noted as a pioneer of culinary tourism in France. She eventually got the attention of Joël Robuchon, who recommended her to then French President François Mitterrand. She served as Mitterrand's personal chef from 1988 to 1990. In that role, she cooked dinners for Mitterrand's family, as well as guests such as Mikhail Gorbachev and Margaret Thatcher.

Ten years after her stint as Mitterrand's chef, Mazet-Delpeuch worked as a cook for a French research base in the Crozet islands for over a year. She applied for the job after seeing an advertisement online, and despite being told they were not looking for a woman or someone over the age of 50 (Mazet-Delpeuch was 60 at the time), she got the job.

== Personal life and death ==
Mazet-Delpeuch was a native of the Périgord region of France. She died on 30 September 2024, at the age of 82.

== Cultural depiction ==
- A character based on Mazet-Delpeuch, named Hortense Laborie, was portrayed by Catherine Frot in the 2012 film Haute Cuisine. In France, the film is known as Les Saveurs du Palais.

== Books ==
- Carnets de cuisine: du Périgord a l'Elysee
- Ma cuisine, de l'Elysée à l'Antarctique (2016)
