= The Final Lesson =

- Film poster
- Directed by: Pascale Pouzadoux
- Screenplay by: Pascale Pouzadoux; Laurent de Bartillat
- Based on: La Dernière Leçon by Noëlle Châtelet
- Produced by: Olivier Delbosc; Marc Missonnier
- Starring: Sandrine Bonnaire; Marthe Villalonga
- Cinematography: Nicolas Brunet
- Edited by: Sylvie Gadmer
- Music by: Éric Neveux
- Production company: Fidélité Films
- Distributed by: Wild Bunch Distribution
- Release dates: 26 August 2015 (Angoulême); 4 November 2015 (France)
- Running time: 105 minutes
- Country: France
- Language: French
- Box office: $1 million

The Final Lesson (French: La Dernière Leçon) is a 2015 French drama film directed by Pascale Pouzadoux and starring Sandrine Bonnaire and Marthe Villalonga. The film is based on the 2004 novel La Dernière Leçon by Noëlle Châtelet.

== Cast ==
- Sandrine Bonnaire as Diane
- Marthe Villalonga as Madeleine
- Antoine Duléry as Pierre
- Gilles Cohen as Clovis
- Grégoire Montana as Max
- Sabine Pakora as Victoria
- Charles Gérard as Charly
- Roby Schinasi as Christophe
- Emmanuelle Galabru as Caroline
- Jonas Dinal as Didid
- Barbara Schulz as Diane's colleague
- Armelle as The nurse
