= Blandine Bellavoir =

French model and actress

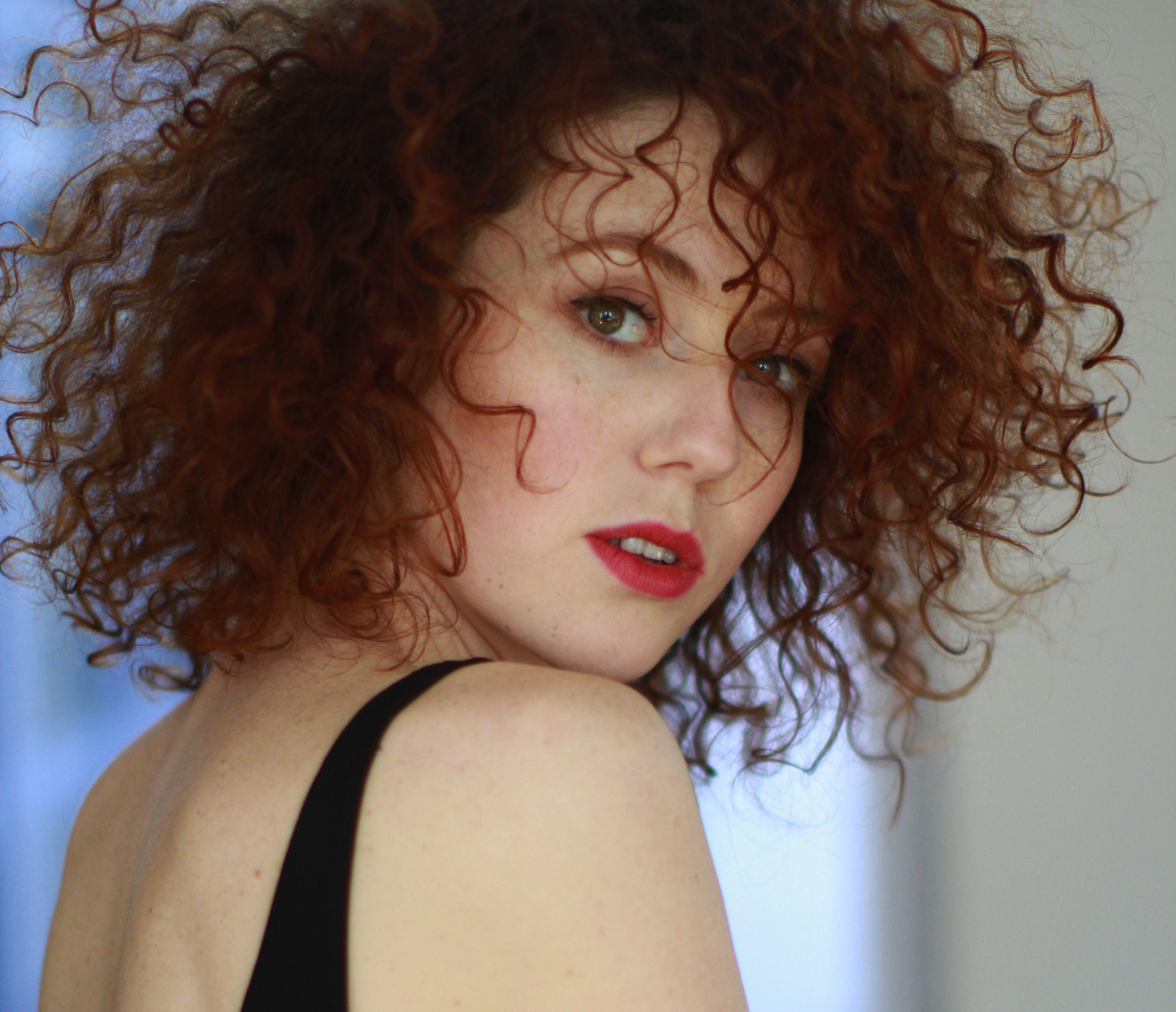
- Bellavoir
- Born: 2 March 1984 (age 41); Malestroit

Blandine Bellavoir (born 2 March 1984) is a French actress and former model. She is mostly known for playing Sonia Escudier in the series Plus belle la vie and Alice Avril in the series Les Petits Meurtres d'Agatha Christie.

== Biography ==
Bellavoir was raised in Guérande (Loire-Atlantique), and attended the lycée Galilée high school.

She began her career as a model for L'Oréal and several other hairstyling brands.

In January 2008, France 3 asked her to play the character of Sonia Escudier, the girlfriend of Maxime Robin (Julien Oliveri) in Plus belle la vie. She left the series in 2009.

Between 2010 and 2013, she played the role of Angèle in the series Maison Close. In May 2012, it was revealed that she and Samuel Labarthe were to form the new duo in the series Les Petits Meurtres d'Agatha Christie, following the departure of Antoine Duléry and Marius Colucci.

In September 2018, Bellavoir announced that she was expected to deliver a baby boy with her partner, Arnaud Perron. In January 2019, she published a photo of the baby.
