= Textiles (film) =

- Directed by: Franck Landron
- Starring: Barbara Schulz; Alexandre Brasseur
- Release date: 9 June 2004
- Running time: 1h 32min
- Country: France
- Language: French

Textiles (French: Les Textiles) is a 2004 French comedy film directed by Franck Landron.

== Cast ==
- Barbara Schulz - Sophie
- Alexandre Brasseur - Olivier
- Magali Muxart - Juliette
- Simon Bakhouche - Gilbert
- Félix Landron - Nono
- Zoé Landron - Laure
- Angélique Thomas - Adeline
- Philippe Cura - Jacky
- Jackie Berroyer - Paul
- Sonia Vollereaux - Colette
