= Élodie Frenck =

Peruvian-Swiss-French actress

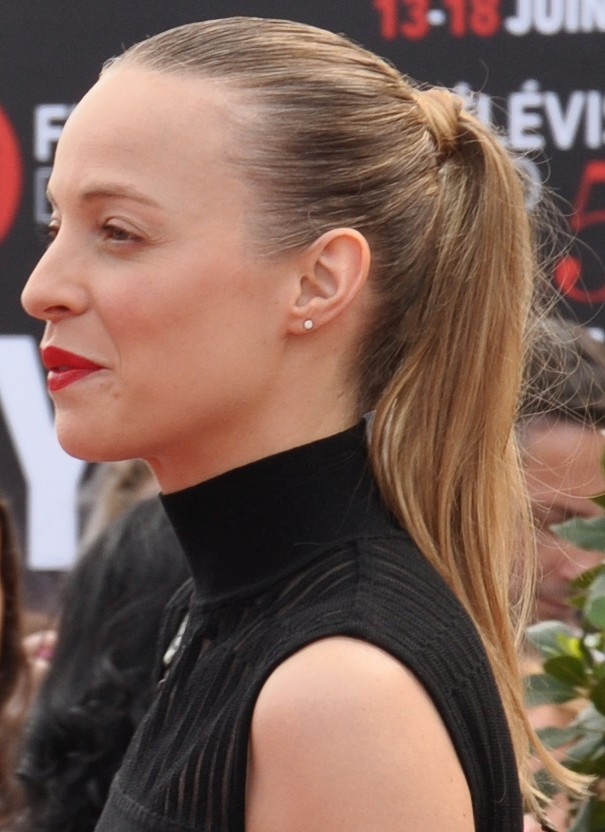
- Frenck in 2015.
- Born: 31 July 1974 (age 51); Lausanne, Switzerland
- Occupation: Actress
- Known for: Les Petits Meurtres d'Agatha Christie

Élodie Frenck is a Peruvian–Swiss–French actress, born 31 July 1974 in Lausanne, Switzerland. She is known for playing the character of Marlène Leroy in the French TV series Les Petits Meurtres d'Agatha Christie.

== Biography ==
Frenck obtained her baccalauréat in 1993. She studied drama at the Belle de Mai, then at the Cours Florent from 1994 to 1997. She took part in a Swiss improvisation league from 1989 to 1997.

She made herself known on television and was gradually offered theatre and film roles. On 16 September 2013 she won the Prix jeune espoir féminin (Aspiring Young Female) at the Festival de la Rochelle for her portrayal of Marlène in the France 2 show Les Petits Meurtres d'Agatha Christie.

She was in Thailand when the tsunami of 2004 struck, making her a survivor of the event.

On 16 September 2011, she gave birth to her son Abel. In December 2016, she announced that she was expecting another child, giving birth to her second son Esteban Abraham in March 2017. Her second son is the third son of her husband Hervé Ruet.

== Filmography ==
=== Cinema ===
==== Feature films ====
- 1993: Louis, enfant roi by Roger Planchon: The large-footed maid
- 1994: Mourir d'amour by Pascal Goethals
- 1998: Lautrec de Roger Planchon: M'dame Fourre-Tout / P'tite Pomme
- 1998: Les Infortunes de la beauté by John Lvoff
- 2000: Cours toujours by Dante Desarthe: The buffet girl
- 2000: Red Shoe Diaries 18: The Game: Johnny's girlfriend (vidéo)
- 2001: Mademoiselle de Philippe Lioret: The wife
- 2001: Confession d'un dragueur by Alain Soral: Hélène
- 2001: Wasabi by Gérard Krawczyk: Banque de la Trinité secretary
- 2001: Les Morsures de l'aube by Antoine de Caunes
- 2002: La Maîtresse en maillot de bain de Lyèce Boukhitine: The sexy waitress
- 2002: Fleurs de sang by Alain Tanner and Myriam Mézières: Tunde
- 2002: Possession by Neil LaBute: Sabine
- 2003: Rien que du bonheur by Denis Parent: Mélanie, one of Désiré's groupies
- 2003: France Boutique by Tonie Marshall: The receptionist
- 2005: Tu vas rire, mais je te quitte by Philippe Harel: Nathalie
- 2005: Ma vie en l'air by Rémi Bezançon: Céline
- 2007: Hellphone by James Huth: Vanessa
- 2008: Comme les autres by Vincent Garenq: A lesbian
- 2009: Rose et Noir by Gérard Jugnot: Philipotte
- 2010: L'Arnacœur by Pascal Chaumeil: Karine
- 2012: Les Papas du dimanche by Louis Becker: Isabelle
- 2016: Deux au carré by Philippe Dajoux: Annabelle

==== Short films ====
- 1998: La Vieille Barrière by Lyèce Boukhitine: A student
- 1998: Casting: ça va pas du tout ! by Lyèce Boukhitine
- 2001: Backstage by Camille Vidal Naquet: Mary
- 2001: Bordel de muses by Thomas Ruat
- 2001: Négrita Maud by Olivier Jean
- 2004: The Venus project by Olivier Jean: Vénus
- 2005: La Course by Gaëlle Baron
- 2006: Feedback by David Sarrio: Frank's wife
- 2017: Jusqu'à écoulement des stocks by Pierre Dugowson

=== Television ===
==== TV series ====
- 1992: Chien et Chat: Marie-France (1 episode)
- 1994: Red Shoe Diaries: Adriana (episode 3.04)
- 1995: Highlander: Arianna (episode 3.15)
- 2000: Police District: Claire (season 1)
- 2001: PJ: Brigitte Monceau (episode 5.12)
- 2001: Avocats et Associés: Marianne Devielle (episode 4.05)
- 2002: Crimes en série: Valérie (episode 1.08)
- 2002: La vie devant nous (1 episode)
- 2002: Largo Winch (1 episode)
- 2005: Faites comme chez vous !: Elsa Meyer (19 episodes)
- 2005: Navarro: Marie Lecourbe (episode 17.04)
- 2005: Vénus et Apollon (episode 1.15)
- 2005: Joséphine, ange gardien (episode La couleur de l'amour): Élodie, the waitress (episode 10.01)
- 2006: Alice Nevers, le juge est une femme: Anne Berger (episode 2.13)
- 2007: Suspectes (miniseries): Juliette Valle
- 2007: Guerre et Paix (miniseries): Lise
- 2008: Duval et Moretti: Dominique Legrand (episode 1.19)
- 2009: Avocats et Associés: Meryelle Lovy (episode 17.06)
- 2009: Femmes de loi: Lili, joueuse de poker (episode 9.08)
- 2009: Nous ne sommes pas des saints: Marie-Madeleine (3 episodes)
- 2010: Enquêtes réservées: Gendron (7 episodes)
- 2010: Les Semaines de Lucide: Lucide
- 2011: La Pire Semaine de ma vie (miniseries): Mélanie
- 2011: T'es pas la seule !: Arielle (20 episodes)
- 2013–2020: Les Petits Meurtres d'Agatha Christie: Marlène Leroy (season 2, episodes 1–27)
- 2014: Fais pas ci, fais pas ça: Marie Herenberg (season 7, episode 6)
- 2018: Capitaine Marleau, episode Les Roseaux noirs de Josée Dayan: Christine Delfino

==== TV movies ====
- 2000: La Femme by mon mari by Charlotte Brandström: Agathe
- 2002: Notes sur le rire by Daniel Losset: Estelle Tardieu
- 2003: Une amie en or by Éric Woreth: Émilie
- 2004: Le fond by l'air est frais by Laurent Carcélès: Sophie
- 2008: Le secret du monde englouti by Jean by Segonzac: Cara
- 2011: Bienvenue à Bouchon by Luc Béraud: Mademoiselle Odile
- 2012: Mange by Virgile Bramly and Julia Ducournau: Shirley
- 2013: Les Complices by Christian Vincent: Clothilde
- 2014: Vogue la vie by Claire by la Rochefoucauld
- 2015: La Clinique du Docteur H by Olivier Barma: Cathy
- 2018: Le Pont du Diable by Sylvie Ayme: Marina Fazergues

== Theatre ==
- 1996: The Taming of the Shrew by William Shakespeare, staged by Pascal Goethals at the Nouveau Théâtre populaire des Flandres
- 1996: Arlequin poli par l'amour by Marivaux, staged by Cédric Prevost
- 2005: Comme par hasard by Élodie Frenck, Magali Giraudo et Vincent Lecoq, staged by Kên Higelin at Ciné 13 Théâtre
- 2006: Jour de neige by Elsa Valensi, staged by Philippe Lellouche at the Palais des glaces

== Distinctions and awards ==
=== Awards ===
- Festival de la fiction TV de La Rochelle 2013: Prix jeune espoir féminin (Aspiring Young Female) for Les Petits Meurtres d'Agatha Christie
