= Noëlle Châtelet =

French writer and academic

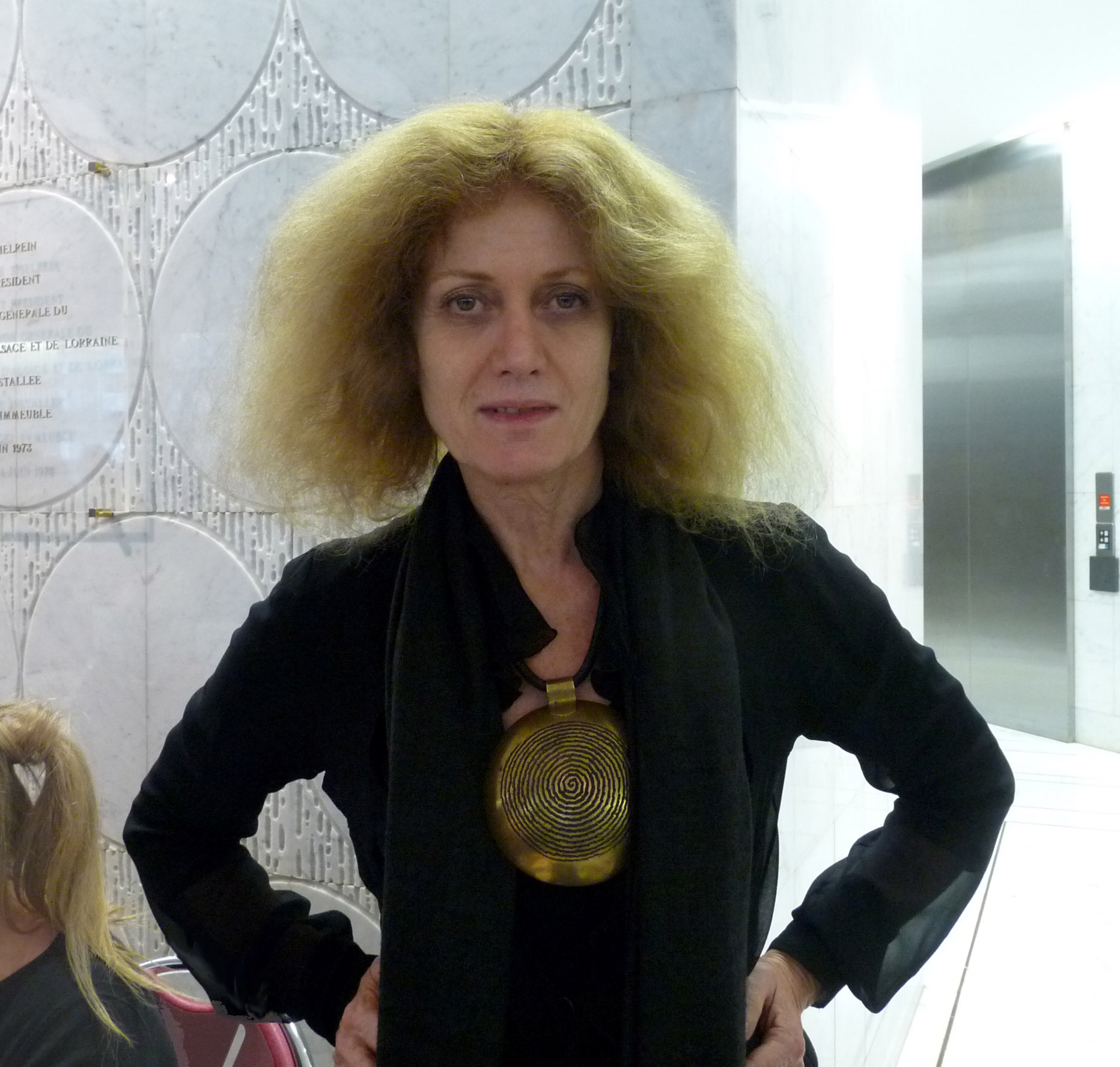
- Born: Noëlle Jospin; 16 October 1944 (age 81); Meudon, France
- Occupation: Writer
- Spouse: François Châtelet
- Relatives: Lionel Jospin (brother)

Academic background
- Education: University of Paris VIII
- Doctoral advisor: Gilles Deleuze

Noëlle Châtelet (French: [nɔɛl ʃɑtlɛ]); born Noëlle Jospin, 16 October 1944) is a French writer and lecturer in the humanities at the Paris Descartes University (Paris V). She is the author of essays, collections of short stories and novels translated into several languages.

== Life and career ==
Noëlle Châtelet obtained her PhD under Gilles Deleuze in 1976 at the University of Paris VIII with a thesis in sociology titled Le Corps à corps culinaire: images et institutions [The Culinary Melee: Images and Institutions] about psychosocial and cultural aspects of eating disorders in young women. She was director of the French Institute of Florence, Italy, from 1989 to 1991. Since 2003, she has been the vice-president of the Society of Men of Letters of France.

She has also participated as an actress in numerous works for television and film until 1987.

She is the widow of the philosopher François Châtelet. She is the sister of Lionel Jospin.

== Honours ==
- 1987: Prix Goncourt de la Nouvelle, Histoires de bouche
- 2009: Chevalier of the Legion of Honour
- 2016: Officer of the Ordre national du Mérite

== Bibliography ==
Non-fiction

- The Culinary Melee
- A Contre-sens, 1989
- A table, 1992
- Le Baiser d'Isabelle, 2007

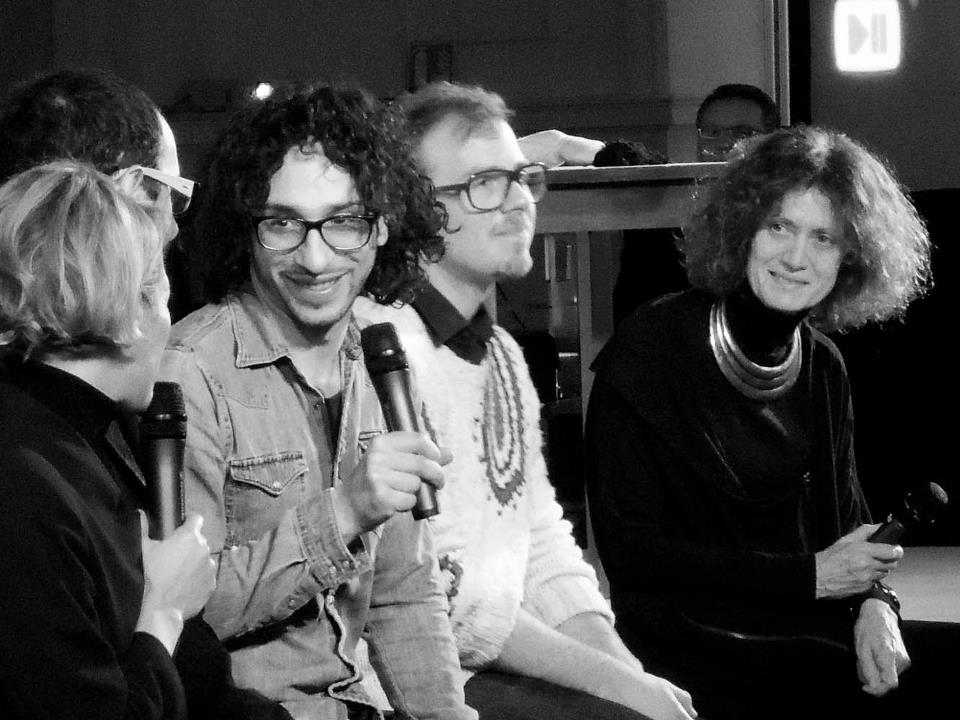
Noëlle Châtelet and Vahram Zaryan / Forum Européen de Bioéthique – Forum Culture / Strasbourg

Fiction

- Histoires de bouches, Mercure de France, 1986/Gallimard Folio, 1988. The new Prix Goncourt in 1987.
- The Short scale, Gallimard, 1991. Folio, 1993.
- The Lady in Blue, Folio, 1997. Price Anna de Noailles, the French Academy.
- La Femme Coquelicot, 1997
- Le Petite aux tournesols, 1998
- La Tête en bas, 2002, Adaptation of the novel and staged a performance of contemporary mime by Compagnie Vahram Zaryan,2013
- La Dernière Leçon, 2004 – adapted into the 2015 film The Final Lesson
- Au pays des vermeilles, 2009
