= Pascale Pouzadoux =

French film director, screenwriter and actress

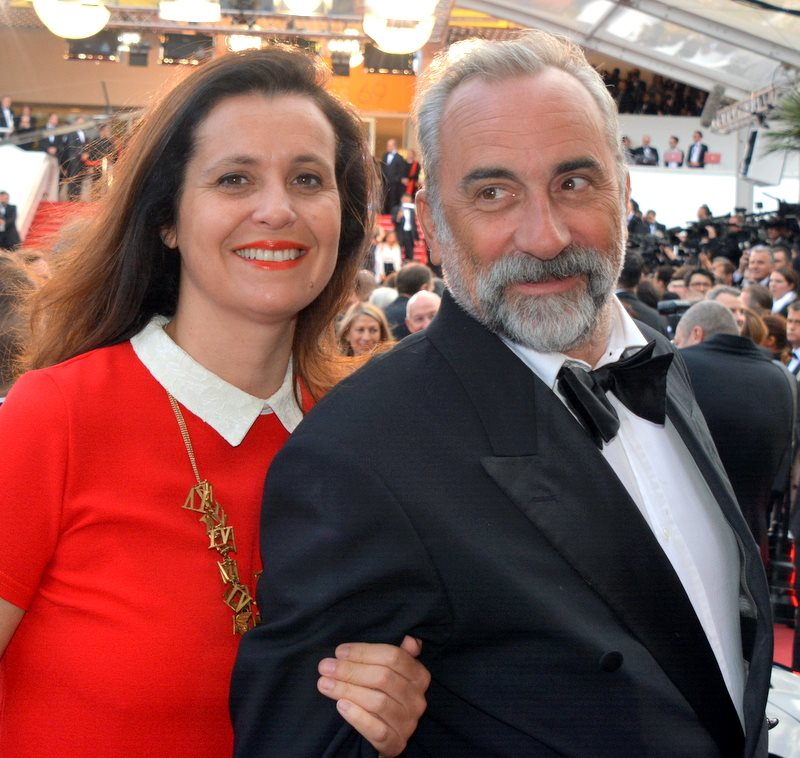
- Pascale Pouzadoux and her partner Antoine Duléry at the 2016 Cannes Film Festival
- Born: 19 April 1970 (age 55); Saint-Mandé, France
- Occupation(s): Film director, screenwriter, actress
- Years active: 1977–present

Pascale Pouzadoux (born 19 April 1970) is a French film director, screenwriter and actress.

== Life and career ==
Pouzadoux was trained at the Théâtre national de Chaillot. She performed in the adaptation of Victor Hugo's L'Intervention, a play staged by Jacqueline Huppert in 1977, before going on to appear in a number of television series and films.

In 2003, she made her feature film directorial debut Toutes les filles sont folles, starring Antoine Duléry, with whom she had two sons, Raphaël and Lucien.

== Filmography ==
Year	Title	Credited as			Notes
Year	Title	Director	Screenwriter	Actress	Notes
1988	Bonjour l'angoisse			Yes	
1990	L'Enfant des loups			Yes	Telefilm
1990	La Télé des Inconnus			Yes	TV series
1990	Les Cadavres exquis de Patricia Highsmith			Yes	TV series
1992	Border Line			Yes	
1993	Tango			Yes	
1993	Les Yeux au plafond			Yes	Short
1994	La Récréation			Yes	Telefilm
1994	Grand brun aux yeux doux	Yes	Yes	Yes	Short
1995	Les Misérables			Yes	
1995	Les Nouveaux Exploits d'Arsène Lupin			Yes	TV series
1995	Navarro			Yes	TV series
1996	Jamais deux sans toi...t			Yes	TV series
1996	Double peine			Yes	Telefilm
1996	Il faut que ça brillex	Yes	Yes		Short
1997	Les Voisins			Yes	Short
1997	4, 5, 6			Yes	Short
1997	Mon jour de chance	Yes	Yes	Yes	Short
2000	À deux sur la comète			Yes	Short
2001	Les Gens en maillot de bain ne sont pas (forcément) superficiels			Yes	
2001	Chercheur d'héritiers			Yes	TV series
2002	Chantage			Yes	Short
2003	Toutes les filles sont folles	Yes	Yes	Yes	
2008	De l'autre côté du lit	Yes	Yes	Yes	
2009	Les Petits Meurtres d'Agatha Christie			Yes	TV series
2011	La Croisière	Yes	Yes		
2015	The Final Lesson	Yes	Yes		
