= La croisière =

La Croisière
- Theatrical release poster
- Directed by: Pascale Pouzadoux
- Written by: Pascale Pouzadoux; Jeanne Le Guillou
- Produced by: Christine De Jekel
- Starring: Charlotte de Turckheim; Line Renaud; Marilou Berry; Antoine Duléry
- Cinematography: Pascal Ridao
- Edited by: Scott Stevenson; Sylvie Gadmer
- Music by: Éric Neveux
- Production company: Fidélité Films
- Distributed by: Mars Distribution
- Release date: 20 April 2011
- Running time: 100 minutes
- Country: France
- Language: French
- Budget: $12.1 million
- Box office: $6.3 million

La Croisière (or The Cruise) is a 2011 French comedy film directed by Pascale Pouzadoux.

== Plot ==
Several characters have their destinies intersect on a cruise ship. Raphael follows his wife who left with her lover, stows away and dresses up as a woman. Simone is an old lady accustomed to carrying her dog in her handbag. A breeder of pigs is in search of her husband who never returned from the toilet. There is also a young pickpocket, Chloe, and Alix, who is very stressed, sent on this cruise by being tricked into believing she had a business appointment. All will meet by chance, an unforgettable experience where everyone will manage to solve their problems and find happiness.

== Cast ==
- Charlotte de Turckheim as Hortense
- Line Renaud as Simone
- Marilou Berry as Alix Sainte-Beuve
- Antoine Duléry as Raphie
- Nora Arnezeder as Chloé
- Armelle as Marie-Do
- Stéphane Debac as Diego
- Audrey Lamy as Samantha
- Alex Lutz as Brian
- Jean Benguigui as The commander
- Nicolas Vaude as The chaplain
- Hubert Saint-Macary as The doctor
- Franck Beckmann as Pierrick Lebouillonec
- Camille Japy as Camille
- Alexandre Brasseur as Camille's lover
- Marilou Lopes-Benites as Marie
- Laurence Badie as Odette
- Jacques Ciron as Raymond
- Eric Fraticelli as Tonio
- Guillaume Rumiel Braun as Frankie
- Michel Duléry as Jean-Pierre
- Arnaud Tsamere, Pauline Delpech, Alice Pol & Hugo Becker as Alix's collaborator
