= De l'autre côté du lit =

- Theatrical release poster
- Directed by: Pascale Pouzadoux
- Screenplay by: Pascale Pouzadoux
- Based on: De l'autre côté du lit by Alix Girod de l'Ain
- Produced by: Fidélité Productions
- Starring: Dany Boon; Sophie Marceau
- Cinematography: Pierre Gill
- Edited by: Sylvie Gadmer
- Music by: Éric Neveux
- Production company: Fidélité Films
- Distributed by: Mars Distribution
- Release dates: 10 December 2008 (Marseille); 7 January 2009 (France)
- Running time: 93 minutes
- Country: France
- Language: French
- Budget: $9.4 million
- Box office: $28.4 million

De l'autre côté du lit (English: Changing Sides) is a 2008 French comedy film directed by Pascale Pouzadoux and starring Sophie Marceau and Dany Boon. Adapted from the novel of the same name by Alix Girod de l'Ain, the film is about a husband and wife who decide to exchange their lives for a year in order to save their marriage. De l'autre côté du lit was filmed on location in Paris.

== Plot ==
When routine sets into Hugo and Ariane's relationship after ten years of marriage, the couple decides to swap lives. Hugo looks after the house and kids and takes up his wife's career as a door-to-door jewelry salesman, and Ariane assumes control of a building rental company.

== Cast ==
- Sophie Marceau as Ariane
- Dany Boon as Hugo
- Roland Giraud as Nicard
- Antoine Duléry as Maurice
- Anny Duperey as Lise
- Juliette Arnaud as Charlotte
- Béatrice Michel as Isabelle
- Ninon Mauger as Louise
- Clémot Couture as Hector
- Flanvart François Vincentelli as Nicolas
- Delphine Rivière as Samia
- Arnaud Lemaire as Kévin, Samia's friend
- Arsène Mosca as Goncalvo
- Armelle as School's director
