= Vahram Zaryan =

Mime artist

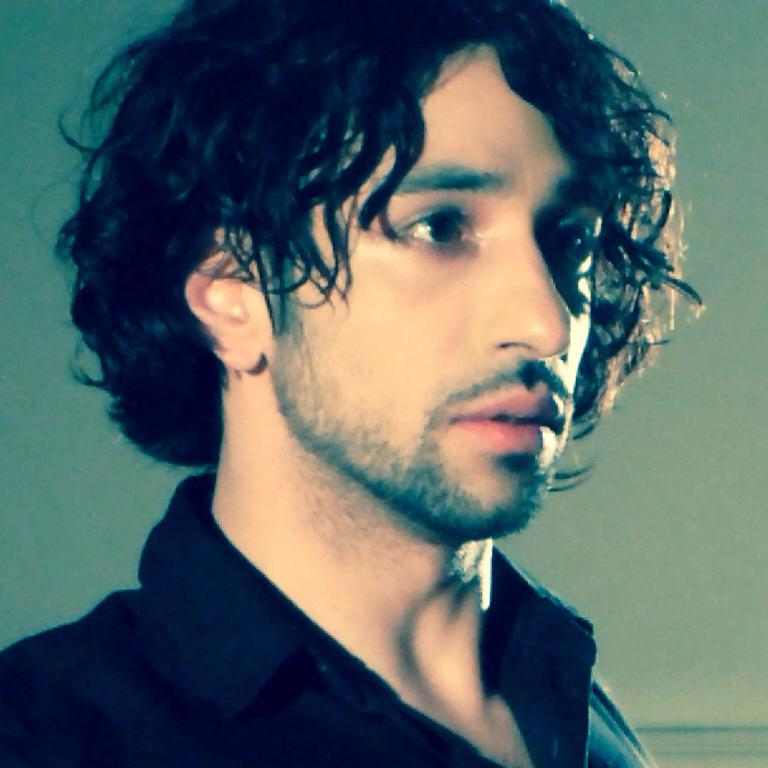
- Zaryan in 2014
- Education: École Internationale de Mimodrame de Paris Marcel Marceau; Conservatoire de Paris; Sorbonne University; YSITC
- Occupations: Performance artist; mime; dancer; director; choreographer
- Career
- Current group: Vahram Zaryan Compagny, Ensemble Regards, Collectif Geoide, Duo XAMP...
- Dances: Mater Replik, Confession, Oblique 1, 2, 3, La Tête en bas (Non-Mime, Contemporary dance Contemporary theatre), Geoide (Music performance)
- Website: vahramzaryan.com

Vahram Zaryan (Armenian: Վահրամ Զարյան) is a French performance artist, mime, dancer, director, and choreographer of Armenian descent.

He is the founder and artistic director of the PERF International Festival, created in June 2019.

== Biography ==
Zaryan studied theatre, body movement, and dance at the National Conservatory of Dramatic Art in Armenia. There, he specialized in mime, beginning his apprenticeship at the State Theater of Pantomime in Yerevan under the direction of Zhirayr Dadasyan. Zaryan moved to the Paris Opera, where he studied classical dance with Yves Casati, and Decroux technique with Yvan Bacciocchi at the Studio of Belleville. Zaryan advanced his studies at the École Internationale de Mimodrame de Paris Marcel Marceau, being one of the last students to receive a degree from this school. Zaryan was an intern and took graduate courses with Ariane Mnouchkine, Carolyn Carlson, Robert Wilson, Marina Abramović, Romeo Castellucci, Krystian Lupa and Maurice Béjart. While writing a doctoral dissertation in theater studies at the University of Paris VIII, from 2008 to 2012, he trained at the Sorbonne University in Paris and the National Conservatory of Music and Dance in Paris (Conservatoire National Supérieur de Musique et de Danse de Paris CNSMDP). Zaryan's research has been attributed to gestural theater and contemporary dance. Zaryan has created a dictionary of "the art of mime and gesture" that collects and preserves specific terms of the art of mime.

Zaryan founded "Le Théâtre Suspendu", a company of mimes, with other Marcel Marceau school graduates. This company performed signature pieces such as Sépia Quartet, and Le Linge Entre Autres, both in France and abroad. At his company's debut, Zaryan interpreted the role of the "white mime". He performed this and other roles at a gala at the Palais Garnier. The gala was staged in honor of the director Sergei Parajanov. The program was a theatrical rendition of this master of Soviet cinema's film, The Color of Pomegranates.

Zaryan also interpreted, to critical success, the role of "Vespone" in the Pergolesi opera, La Serva Padrona at the Theater of the Tambour Royal in Paris.

Zaryan also creates with M. Gentet the performance "Reminiscence / AU CŒUR DE L'OBLIQUE" on the music of the composer Hector Parra. This last creation is presented at the Théâtre des Bouffes du Nord during the Festival Pianos Pianos 2022. Between 2020 and 2022 he also created the performance based on Philippe Schœller's "Trois Preludes" and the show "Géoïde" presented at the Cabaret Sauvage in Paris. He has recently collaborated with contemporary composers such as Maël Bailly, Vincent Trollet, Januibe Tejera, Juan Arroyo and Farnaz Modarresifar.

== NON-MIME ==
Vahram Zaryan is the pioneer and inventor of a new movement and genre in the art of mime called "Non-Mime". This notion is invented and developed by Vahram Zaryan and his collective, in 2005, to think and create a contemporary approach of miming even more as a new discipline of this classical genre. Asserting a transdisciplinary approach to stage performance, this creation diverges from traditional mime to embrace and even substitute other art forms such as theater, video, reading, visual arts, music, and dance, thus renewing the practice of classical mime, which is no longer predominant.

== Compagnie Vahram Zaryan ==
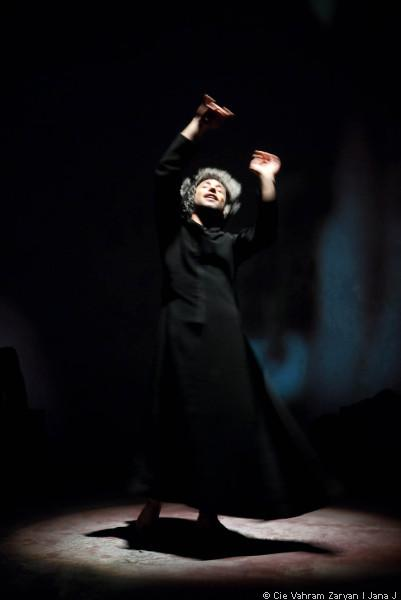
Vahram Zaryan, Ваграм Зарян, Վահրամ Զարյան "Mater Replik"

Zaryan founded the troupe, "Compagnie Vahram Zaryan". Its focus is the development of new mime and contemporary movement theater. Zaryan created the work, Confessions. The work has been presented in France and across Europe. In 2010, it was performed at the official closing ceremony of International Mime Festival in Tsaghkadzor.

Soon after, Zaryan's work, Mater Replik played at L'Atelier du Plateau in Paris. It toured in Europe; in the United States at New York City's Richmond Shepard Theatre; and in Russia at La Tete en Bas. In 2012, Zaryan's company was staging the Noëlle Châtelet novel, The Head Down (2002) as a contemporary mime show.

In 2012 and 2013, the Vahram Zaryan Company was associated with Monfort Theatre, Cultural Institution of the City of Paris, and participated in projects funded by the DAC workshops and DASCO, City of Paris.

Vahram Zaryan is the co-founder of Collectif Géoïde (Collectif G) with pianist Maroussia Gentet, founded in 2020. Passionate about sharing his art and transdisciplinarity, his research on contemporary theater, Non-Mime and Music communicates with the creation of the piano/performance duet elaborated with the pianist Maroussia Gentet within the framework of Collectif Géoïde.

== Performance art ==
Zaryan makes performance art in museums and international contemporary art galleries. He collaborated with Nina Childress in her work, Rideau Vert at the Gallery of Bernard Jordan in Paris. He has also staged a performance directed by Dramatic Corporeal Mime and taken from Etienne Decroux.

Vahram Zaryan created a video art performance during Melik Ohanian's "Stutterig" exhibition at the CRAC de Sète at Galerie Chantal Crousel in Paris in 2015. Vahram Zaryan presents his performance Patrel at the ReTramp gallery in Berlin in May 2024 as part of the FesKa.

== CREATIONS: performances, contemporary mime, dance, theatre ==
- Le Linge (2006)
- Sepia Quartet (2007) Théâtre Suspendu
- Chaplin (2008)
- Couleurs de la Grenade (2009) Sergei Parajanov
- La Serva Padrona (2011) Giovanni Battista Pergolesi
- Confession (2011)
- ILYA (2012)
- Mater Replik (2012 - 2013)
- Vespone (2012) at the Pergolesi opera
- La Serva Padrona (2012) Theater of the Tambour Royal
- La Tête en bas (2014) by Noëlle Châtelet, an adaptation of the novel in contemporary mime
- Disquiet (2016) from The Book of Disquiet by Fernando Pessoa
- Théâtre (2016) by Marcus Borja
- Oblique Cycle 1 (2017-2018)
- Oblique Cycle 2 (2019-2022)
- GEOIDE performance (2020-2022)
- Performances Prélude N1, Serpents, Corbeau ... Music by Philippe Schoeller (2019-2022)
- Reminiscence / AU CŒUR DE L'OBLIQU with pianist Maroussia Gentet, Music by Hector Parra (2020-2022)
- Performance Pandora's Box, with Jean-Etienne Sotty, music: Mauricio Kagel (2020-2023)
- Performance, duo Dés-Hommes (freely inspired by the novel The Dice Man by Luke Rhinehart - George Cockcroft), (2022-2024)
- Oblique Cycle 3 (2022-2024)
- PATREL | Je suis (I am the separate track of my tear), 2024

== Books and Bibliography ==
- Les Cahiers de la Montagne Noir (2019), Cahiers n°3 (France)
- Les Cahiers de la Montagne Noir (2018), Cahiers n°2 (France)
- Mystery of Art: Marcel Marceau (2013) Originally, ՄԱՐՍԵԼ ՄԱՐՍՈՅԻ ԱՐՎԵՍՏԻ ՀՍՏԱԿՈՒԹՅԱՆ ԱՌԵՂԾՎԱԾԸ... (Armenia)
- Mater Replik (2012)
