= Haute Cuisine (film) =

2012 French comedy-drama film

- Film poster
- Directed by: Christian Vincent
- Written by: Christian Vincent; Étienne Comar
- Produced by: Étienne Comar; Philippe Rousselet
- Starring: Catherine Frot; Arthur Dupont; Jean d'Ormesson
- Cinematography: Laurent Dailland
- Edited by: Monica Coleman
- Music by: Gabriel Yared
- Production companies: Vendôme Production; France 2 Cinéma; Wild Bunch; Armada Films; Canal+
- Distributed by: Wild Bunch (France)
- Release dates: 26 September 2012 (Angoulême); 19 September 2012 (France)
- Running time: 95 minutes
- Country: France
- Language: French
- Budget: $9.3 million
- Box office: $11.5 million

Haute Cuisine is a 2012 French comedy-drama film based on the true story of Danièle Mazet-Delpeuch and how she was appointed as the private chef for François Mitterrand. The original French title is Les Saveurs du Palais.

== Plot ==
Hortense Laborie (Catherine Frot), a renowned chef from Périgord, is astonished when the President of the Republic (Jean d'Ormesson) appoints her as his personal chef, responsible for creating all his meals at the Élysée Palace. Despite jealous resentment from the other kitchen staff, Hortense quickly establishes herself, thanks to her indomitable spirit. The authenticity of her cooking soon seduces the President, but the corridors of power are littered with traps. The story is framed by Laborie's later role cooking at a French Antarctic research station.

== Cast ==
- Catherine Frot as Hortense Laborie
- Arthur Dupont as Nicolas Bauvois
- Jean d'Ormesson as The President
- Hippolyte Girardot as David Azoulay
- Jean-Marc Roulot as Jean-Marc Luchet
- Brice Fournier as Pascal Le Piq
- Arly Jover as Mary
- Joe Sheridan as John
- Laurent Poitrenaux as Jean-Michel Salomé
- Hervé Pierre as Perrières
- Manuel Le Lièvre as Loïc
- Steve Tran as Grégory
- Thomas Chabrol as Prefect's chief of staff

== Production ==
Parts of the movie were actually filmed at the Élysée Palace, in a three-day shooting window where filming was only allowed when then President Nicolas Sarkozy was not at the palace.

Iceland served as a stand-in for the Crozet islands in the movie. The film crew spent six days there to film on location.

== Reception ==
The review aggregator website Rotten Tomatoes reports a 68% approval rating with an average rating of 6.1/10 based on 31 reviews. The website's consensus reads, "While it'll certainly be an easier sell for foodie filmgoers, Haute Cuisine's beautifully filmed biopic should satisfy most viewers hungry for a beautifully filmed dramedy." On Metacritic, it has a score of 61 out of 100 based on 14 reviews, indicating "generally favorable reviews".
