= Pauline Delpech =

French actress and writer

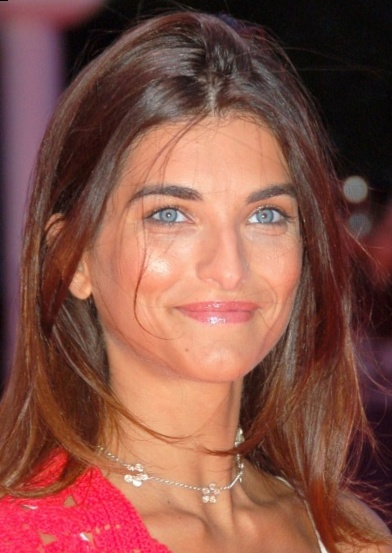
- Delpech in 2008
- Born: Pauline Bidegaray; 20 August 1981 (age 45)
- Occupations: Writer, actress, politician

Pauline Delpech is a writer and a French actress who was born in 1981. She is also active in local politics and has served as a councillor in the 17th arrondissement of Paris since 2014.

== Biography ==
Her real name is Pauline Bidegaray; she took her stage name from her stepfather, singer Michel Delpech. She later described having a close bond with Delpech and said she regarded him as her real father.

== Career as an actress ==
Short films

- Man in the Box (2003)
- Device blues Slony Sow
- The trigeminal nerve by Jacques Richard
- 7 Stephane Werger

TV movies and series

- R.I.S, police scientifique, in the eighth episode, a small part of the drifter addict accused of murder
- The Bobonbos Alain Belinea murmurs production in 2008
- Le Grand Restaurant (Pierre Palmade), directed and choreographed by Gerard Pullicino (2010)

Feature films

- Tears of Mr. lanches Ux (2004) Jordi Avalos,
- Disco de Fabien Onteniente (2007)
- Official Selection of Jacques Richard (2008), the leading female role alongside Manuel Blanc, Dani, Serge Khalfon, Michael Lonsdale, Gabrielle Lazure, Isabelle Pascot, Domnique Pinont.
- Courier of Renoh Hervé (2009)
- La croisière (2011)
- Miles of a Dream (2013) – major role

Parts

- Window on torque Feydeau
- Damage to ego of Erwan Larher
- And if you went to Roman Girot
- I love you forever Rachel Moses.

In his projects, a role in the upcoming film by Patrick Levy: The Seasonal.

== Books ==
She created the character of Commissioner Andrew George Barnaby, the central hero.

- Under the Black Snow, ed. Michel Lafon, January 2007, ISBN 978-2-253-12294-4.
- And I'll burn your heart of stone, ed. Michel Lafon, February 2008, ISBN 978-2-7499-0797-0
- The blood of doves, ed. Michel Lafon, June 2009
- In Northern Mists, ed. Michel Lafon, October 2009 ISBN 978-2-7499-1012-3

== See also ==
- Michel Delpech
- French actresses
- Women in politics
