= Day Off (film) =

2001 French drama film

- Directed by: Pascal Thomas
- Starring: Vincent Lindon
- Cinematography: Christophe Beaucarne
- Release date: 28 March 2001
- Running time: 127 minutes
- Country: France
- Language: French
- Budget: $6 million
- Box office: $2.5 million

Day Off (Title in French: Mercredi, folle journée !) is a 2001 French drama film directed by Pascal Thomas.

== Cast ==
- Vincent Lindon - Martin Socoa
- Christian Morin - Agenore Esposito
- Alessandra Martines - Francesca Socoa
- Catherine Frot - Sophie
- Victoria Lafaurie - Victoria
- Olivier Gourmet - Denis Pelloutier
- Isabelle Candelier - Vitalie Rambaud
- Luis Rego - Mercier
- Anne Le Ny - Marie Pelloutier
- Armelle - Marie-Thérèse
- Katia Tchenko - Huguette Lepange
