= Alexandre Brasseur =

French actor (born 1971)

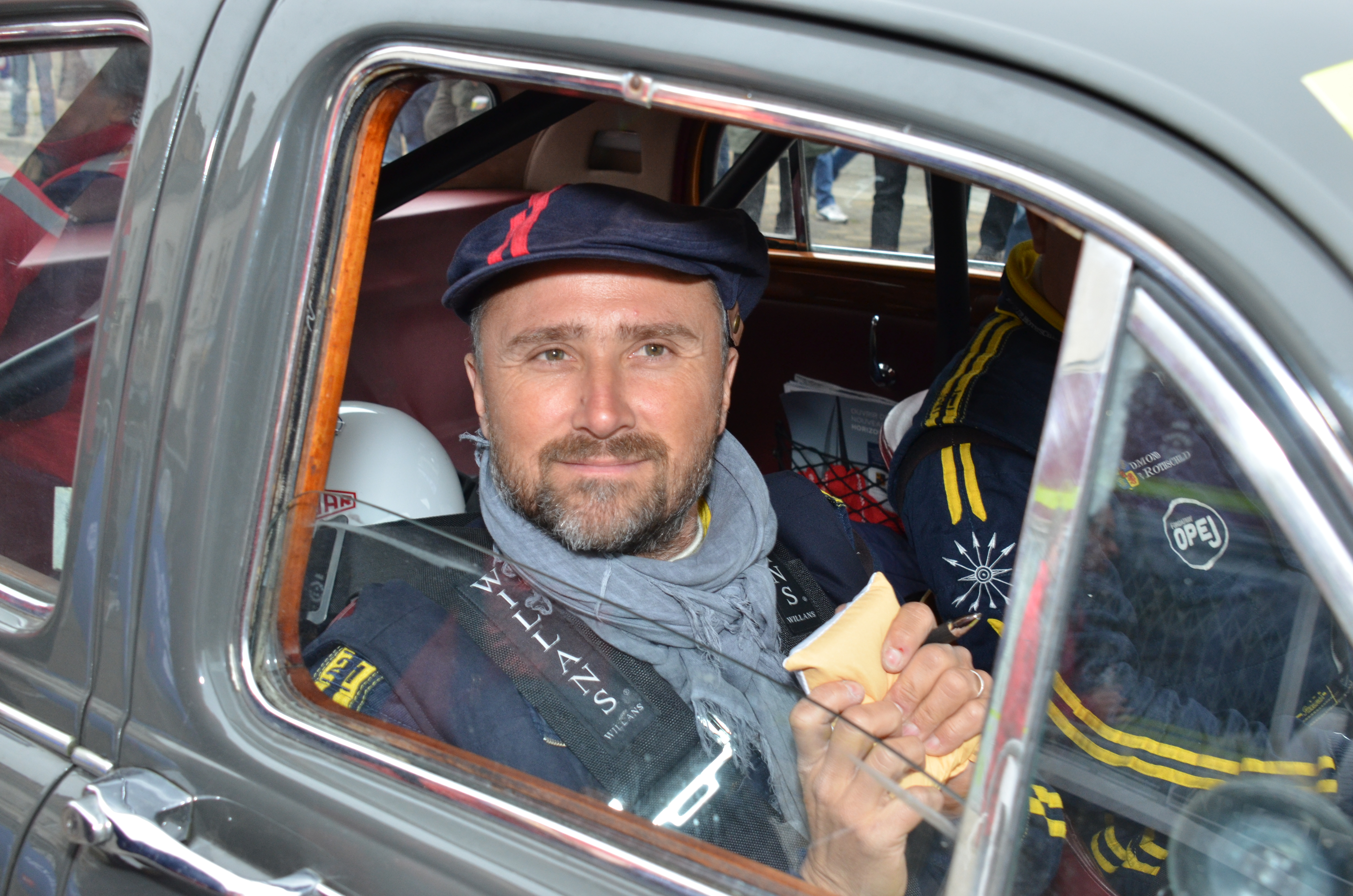
- Born: Alexandre Espinasse; 29 March 1971 (age 53); Neuilly-sur-Seine
- Occupation(s): Actor, film director, screenwriter
- Website: http://www.alexandrebrasseur.com

Alexandre Brasseur (born Alexandre Espinasse; 29 March 1971) is a French actor. He was born in Neuilly-sur-Seine, the son of actor Claude Brasseur, the grandson of actor Pierre Brasseur and actress Odette Joyeux.

== Filmography ==
- Le Souper (1992)
- Les Ténors (1993)
- Le plus beau pays du monde (1998)
- La courte-échelle (1999), with Serge Lama. Short film directed by Thierry Poirier, based on a short story by Gédéon Picot
- Maigret (TV series) (from 1999 to 2002), as Inspector Paul Lachenal
- Le Mal de vivre (2002)
- La Bataille d'Hernani (TV, 2002)
- La Liberté de Marie (2002)
- Les Thibault (TV, 2003)
- Les Textiles (2004)
- Malabar Princess (2004)
- Le plus beau jour de ma vie (2004)
- Quand les anges s'en mêlent (2004)
- Jaurès (téléfilm 2005)
- Le Juge est une femme (TV, 2005)
- La Croisière (2011)
- La Maison des Rocheville (TV, 2010)
- Colt 45 (2014)
- Joséphine, ange gardien (TV, 2016)
- The Collection (TV, 2016)
- Demain nous appartient (TV, 2017 - now)

== Theatre ==
- 1995 : Viens chez moi j'habite chez une copine by Didier Kaminka and Luis Rego, directed by Jean-Luc Moreau, Théâtre Rive Gauche
- 1996 : Crime et châtiment (Crime and Punishment) by Fiodor Dostoïevski, directed by Jean-Claude Idée, Théâtre Mouffetard
- 1997 : Cyrano de Bergerac by Edmond Rostand, directed by Jérôme Savary, Théâtre national de Chaillot
- 1999 : La Cerisaie (The Cherry Orchard) by Anton Tchekhov, directed by Georges Wilson, Espace Pierre Cardin
- 2000 : Joyeuses Pâques by Jean Poiret, directed by Bernard Murat, Théâtre des Variétés
- 2005 : La Locandiera (The Mistress of the Inn) by Carlo Goldoni, directed by Alain Sachs, Théâtre Antoine
- 2007 - 2008 : Mon père avait raison by Sacha Guitry, directed by Bernard Murat, Théâtre Édouard VII
- 2011 : De filles en aiguilles (Shady Business) by Robin Hawdon, adapted by Stewart Vaughan and Jean-Christophe Barc, directed by Jacques Décombe, Théâtre de la Michodière
- 2013 : Toutes les dates de naissance et de mort by Régis de Martrin-Donos, directed by Gilbert Désveaux, tour
- 2013 : Crime sans ordonnance (Prescription:Murder) by William Link and Richard Levinson, adapted by Pierre Sauvil, directed by Didier Caron, tour
- 2014 : Georges et Georges by Éric-Emmanuel Schmitt, directed by Steve Suissa, Théâtre Rive Gauche
- 2016 : Brasseur et les Enfants du paradis by and directed by Daniel Colas, Festival de Figeac followed by tour then Théâtre du Petit-Saint-Martin
- 2019 : Les Funambules by and directed by Daniel Colas, festival off - Avignon
