= Gilles Lapouge =

French writer (1923–2020)

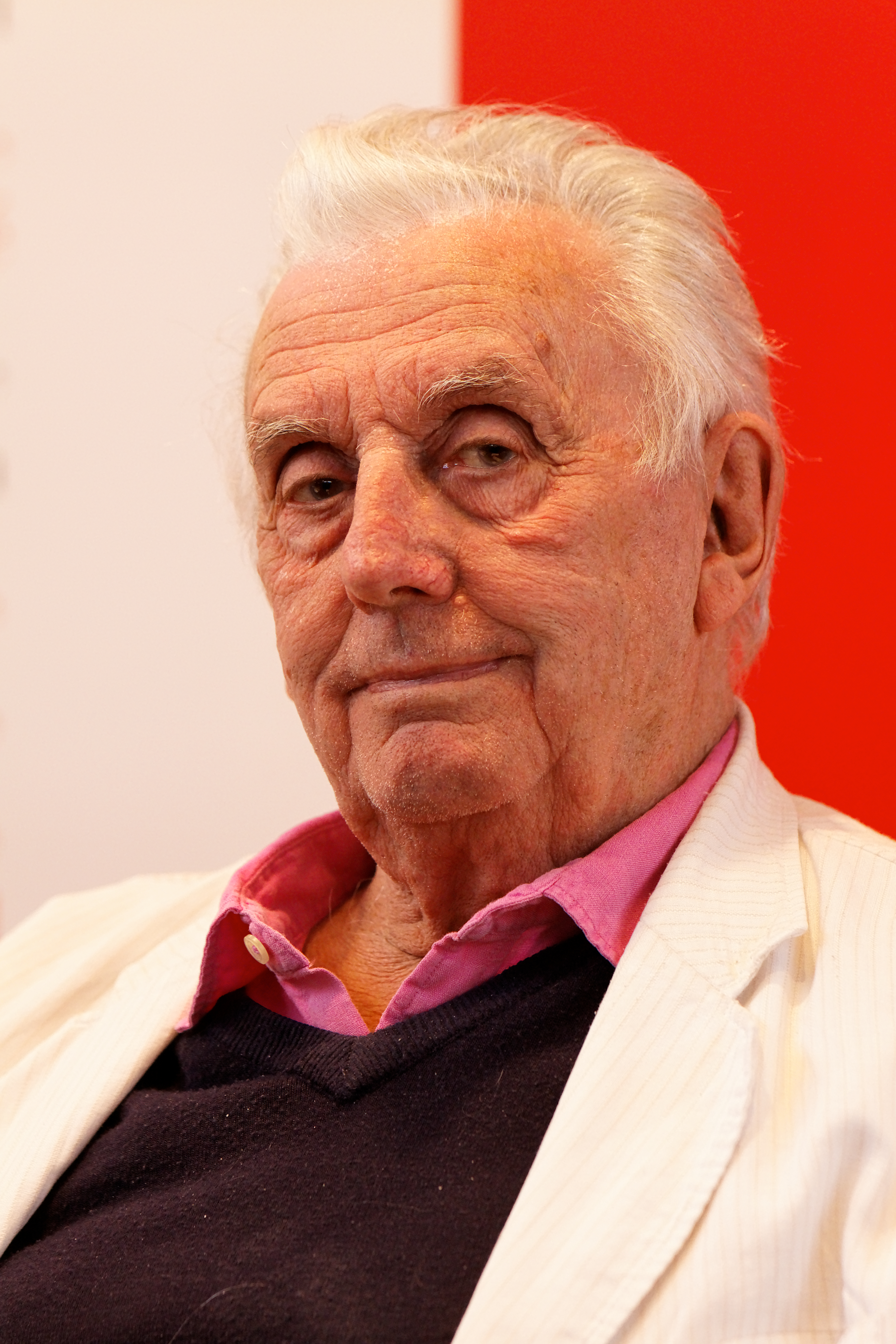
Gilles Lapouge in 2011

Gilles Lapouge (7 November 1923 – 31 July 2020) was a French writer and journalist with the daily O Estado de S. Paulo. He won the 2007 Prix Femina Essai.

== Life ==
He grew up in Algeria, where his father was in the military. After studying history and geography, he became a journalist. In 1950 he moved to Brazil. For three years he worked for the Brazilian newspaper O Estado de S. Paulo, where he remained a correspondent in France for more than forty years. Back in France, he worked in Le Monde, the Figaro Littéraire and Combat. He participated in the Bernard Pivot program, "Ouvrez les guillemets" ("Open the quotes") which became Apostrophes". In France Culture, he produced the show "Agora" and then "En étrange pays" ("in foreign countries").

He served on the editorial board of La Quinzaine littéraire. He appeared at the Étonnants voyageurs festival at Saint-Malo. He died at the age of 96 on 31 July 2020.

== Works ==
- Les Pirates, Payot, 1987
- Équinoxiale, Flammarion, Paris, 1977, ISBN 2-08-060963-7
- Un soldat en déroute, Folio
- Le Singe de la montre, 1982
- Utopie et civilisations, 1973
- La Révolution sans modèle, with François Châtelet and Olivier Revault d'Allonnes, Mouton, 1974
- La Bataille de Wagram, Flammarion, Prix des Deux Magots, 1987
- La Folie Koenigsmark, A. Michel, 1996
- L'Incendie de Copenhague, A. Michel, Prix Cazes, 1996
- Le Bruit de la neige, A. Michel
- Besoin de mirages, Seuil, 1998
- Au revoir l’Amazonie, 2000 (publié sur Internet, au Brésil)
- La Mission des frontières, A. Michel, 2002
- Le Bois des amoureux, A. Michel, 2006
- L'Encre du voyageur, A. Michel, 2007
- La Légende de la géographie, A. Michel, 2009
- La Maison des lettres. Conversations avec Christophe Mercier, Phébus, 2009
- Dictionnaire amoureux du Brésil, Ed. Plon, Paris, 2011, ISBN 2-259-20925-4
