= Antoine Duléry =

French actor (born 1959)

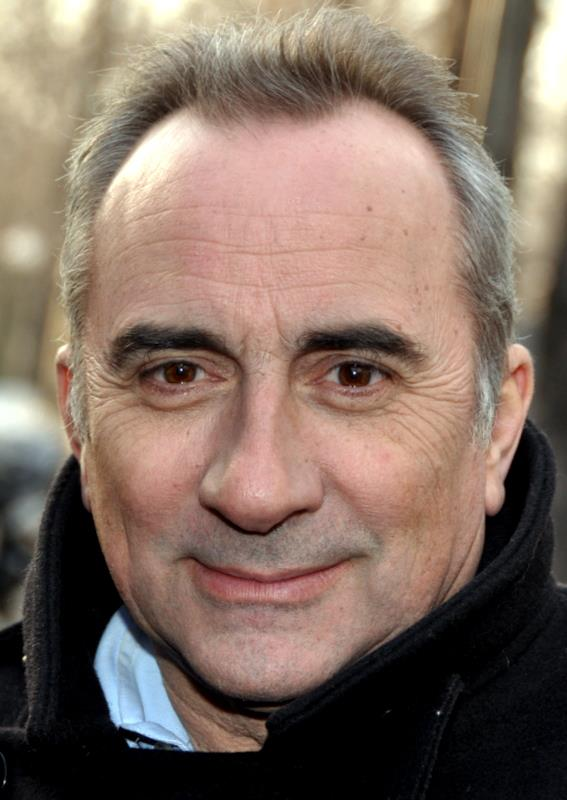
- Antoine Duléry in 2013
- Born: 14 November 1959 (age 66); Paris, France
- Occupation: Actor
- Years active: 1980–present

Antoine Duléry (born 14 November 1959 in Paris) is a French actor.

== Theater ==
Year	Title	Author	Director
1980	Une soirée comme une autre	Jacques Sternberg	Christian François
1985	Le Cid	Pierre Corneille	Francis Huster
1985	Impasse-Privé	Christian Charmetant & Antoine Duléry	Michel Berto
1986	Diderot et l’abbé Barthélémy	Denis Diderot	Jacques Spiesser
1987	The Normal Heart	Larry Kramer	Raymond Acquaviva
1987	Richard de Gloucester	Francis Huster	Francis Huster
1989	Lorenzaccio	Alfred de Musset	Francis Huster
1990	A Doll's House	Henrik Ibsen	Isabelle Nanty
1996-97	A Flea in Her Ear	Georges Feydeau	Bernard Murat
2013-17	Antoine Duléry fait son cinéma	Antoine Duléry	Pascal Serieis
2017-23	Antoine Duléry nous refait son cinéma	Antoine Duléry & Pascal Serieis	Pascal Serieis
2022	Par le bout du nez	Matthieu Delaporte & Alexandre de La Patellière	Bernard Murat
2023	On ne voit bien qu’avec le cœur	Antoine & Consuelo de Saint-Exupéry	Delphine de Malherbe

== Filmography ==
=== Cinema ===
Year	Title	Role	Director	Notes
1981	Celles qu'on n'a pas eues	The young cop	Pascal Thomas	
1984	Stress		Jean-Louis Bertuccelli	
1986	On a volé Charlie Spencer!		Francis Huster	
1987	La pension		Marc Cadieux	Short
1988	Blanc de Chine	Bastien	Denys Granier-Deferre	
1989	Moitié-moitié	Xavier	Paul Boujenah	
1989	Comédie d'amour	The writer	Jean-Pierre Rawson	
1991	Les fleurs du mal	Charles Baudelaire	Jean-Pierre Rawson	
1993	Profil bas	Franck	Claude Zidi	
1993	Tout ça... pour ça !	Antoine	Claude Lelouch	
1993	Méprises multiples		Christian Charmetant	Short
1994	Le voleur et la menteuse		Paul Boujenah	
1994	La Vengeance d'une blonde	Alex	Jeannot Szwarc	
1994	Descente		Philippe Haïm	Short
1995	Les Misérables	Crazy street urchin	Claude Lelouch	
1996	L'échappée belle	Clovis Delmotte	Étienne Dhaene	
1996	Men, Women: A User's Manual		Claude Lelouch	
1996	Il faut que ça brille!		Pascale Pouzadoux	Short
1997	La ballade de Titus	Monsieur Marsan	Vincent De Brus	
1997	Les voisins		Artus de Penguern	Short
1997	Mon jour de chance		Pascale Pouzadoux	Short
1998	Ça reste entre nous	Gilles	Martin Lamotte	
1998	La polyclinique de l'amour	John	Artus de Penguern	Short
1999	Du bleu jusqu'en Amérique	Martine's father	Sarah Lévy	
1999	Faire-part	Tonio	Philippe Caroit	Short
2000	Le coeur à l'ouvrage	Drama teacher	Laurent Dussaux	
2000	Most Promising Young Actress	Stéphane Leroy	Gérard Jugnot	
2000	À deux sur la comète		Alexandre Mehring	Short
2000	Demain est un autre jour		Laurent Tirard	Short
2001	Gregoire Moulin vs. Humanity	Emmanuel Lacarrière	Artus de Penguern	
2002	Sexes très opposés	Cyril	Éric Assous	
2003	Toutes les filles sont folles	Raoul	Pascale Pouzadoux	
2004	Mariages!	Hugo	Valérie Guignabodet	
2004	Clara et moi	BT	Arnaud Viard	
2004	Les parisiens	The bartender	Claude Lelouch	
2004	Mariage mixte	Jo Sassia	Alexandre Arcady	
2005	Brice de Nice	Micky	James Huth	
2005	L'anniversaire	Charlie	Diane Kurys	
2005	Le courage d'aimer	The bar patron	Claude Lelouch	
2005	Tu vas rire, mais je te quitte	Casting Director	Philippe Harel	
2006	Camping	Paul Gatineau	Fabien Onteniente	
2006	Jean-Philippe	Chris Summer	Laurent Tuel	
2008	Magique!	Auguste	Philippe Muyl	
2008	Mes stars et moi	Lieutenant Bart	Laetitia Colombani	
2008	Les dents de la nuit	Paul Lefranc	Stephen Cafiero & Vincent Lobelle	
2009	Victor	Guillaume Saillard	Thomas Gilou	
2009	A Man and His Dog	Jeanne's friend	Francis Huster	
2009	De l'autre côté du lit	Maurice	Pascale Pouzadoux	
2010	Camping 2	Paul Gatineau	Fabien Onteniente	
2011	Headwinds	Alex Anderen	Jalil Lespert	
2011	La croisière	Raphie	Pascale Pouzadoux	
2012	Sea, No Sex & Sun	Pierre	Christophe Turpin	
2012	Chapeau	Jarvis	Jean-Pierre Mocky	Short
2013	Le renard jaune	Léo	Jean-Pierre Mocky	
2014	Salaud, on t'aime	The new owner	Claude Lelouch	
2015	The Final Lesson	Pierre	Pascale Pouzadoux	
2016	Camping 3	Paul Gatineau	Fabien Onteniente	
2017	Everyone's Life	The cop / The mayor	Claude Lelouch	
2017	Bienvenue au Gondwana	Frédéric Delaville	Mamane	
2019	Edmond	Le Bret / Lignières	Alexis Michalik	
2019	Thomas	Jo	Julien Camy & Antoine Dalibard	Short
2020	Le contrat	Andrea Morin	Janicke Askevold	Short
2022	Alors on danse	Paul	Michèle Laroque	
2022	Maison de retraite	Daniel Ferrand	Thomas Gilou	
2022	Umami	Robert Groult	Slony Sow	

=== Television ===
Year	Title	Role	Director	Notes
1981	La vie des autres	Collomb	Gilles Legrand	TV series (1 episode)
1982	Mersonne ne m'aime	A journalist	Liliane de Kermadec	TV movie
1986	Le tiroir secret	Stanislas's agent	Michel Boisrond	TV mini-series
1988	Palace	A fisherman	Jean-Michel Ribes	TV series (1 episode)
1988	Sueurs froides	The inspector	José Pinheiro	TV series (1 episode)
1988	Julien Fontanes, magistrat	Espère	Michel Berny	TV series (1 episode)
1989	Imogène	Gérard Borde	François Leterrier	TV series (1 episode)
1989	Palace	The groom	Jean-Michel Ribes	TV series (2 episodes)
1991	L'huissier	The prefect assistant	Pierre Tchernia	TV movie
1992	Odyssée bidon	Charles-Henry Lemonnier	Donald Kent	TV movie
1992	Ascension Express	David	Nicolas Ribowski	TV movie
1992	Papa veut pas que je t'épouse	Bruitou	Patrick Volson	TV movie
1992	Le JAP, juge d'application des peines	Tony Cachan	Josée Dayan	TV series (1 episode)
1993	Navarro	Leblanc	Gérard Marx	TV series (1 episode)
1994	La récréation	Bocquet	Nicolas Ribowski	TV movie
1994	Chien et chat	Servais	Marc Simenon	TV series (1 episode)
1995	Été brulant	Nicolaï	Jérôme Foulon	TV movie
1995	Une page d'amour	Malignon	Serge Moati	TV movie
1995	François Kléber	Zappa	Olivier Marchal	TV series (1 episode)
1995	Le retour d'Arsène Lupin	Victor	Nicolas Ribowski	TV series (1 episode)
1996	Tendre piège	Daniel	Serge Moati	TV movie
1996	Le secret d'Iris	Phil	Élisabeth Rappeneau	TV movie
1996	Sixième classique	Michel	Bernard Stora	TV movie
1996	La rançon du chien	Colonna	Peter Kassovitz	TV movie
1996	Le marché du sport	Bruno Massena	Luc Béraud	TV movie
1997	La mère de nos enfants	Romain	Jean-Louis Lorenzi	TV movie
1997	L'amour dans le désordre	Francis	Élisabeth Rappeneau	TV movie
1998	Un mois de réflexion	Daniel Galibert	Serge Moati	TV movie
1998	Deux mamans pour Noël	Eric	Paul Gueu	TV movie
1999	Juliette	Michel Dastier	Jérôme Foulon	TV movie
1999	Maison de famille	Daniel Galibert	Serge Moati	TV movie
1999	Si les poules avaient des dents	The farmer	Pierre Dugowson	TV movie
2000	Chacun chez soi	François	Élisabeth Rappeneau	TV movie
2000	La femme de mon mari	Bruno	Charlotte Brandström	TV movie
2000	Lyon police spéciale	Roman	Bertrand Arthuys	TV series (1 episode)
2001	Tel épris	Antoine	Fabien Onteniente	TV movie
2001	L'aîné des Ferchaux	Andréani	Bernard Stora	TV movie
2001	Les rencontres de Joëlle	Jacques Meslien	Patrick Poubel	TV movie
2001	Brigade spéciale	Thomas Favart	Charlotte Brandström	TV series (1 episode)
2002	Une autre femme	Pierre	Jérôme Foulon	TV movie
2003	Lyon police spéciale	Roman	Dominique Tabuteau	TV series (1 episode)
2004	Les robinsonnes	Jean-Claude	Laurent Dussaux	TV movie
2004	Clara et associés	Paul Delvaux	Gérard Marx	TV movie
2004	Caution personnelle	Vincent Roussel	Serge Meynard	TV movie
2004	Commissaire Moulin	Pontet-Mondot	Yves Rénier	TV series (1 episode)
2005	Prune Becker	Nicolas	Alexandre Pidoux	TV movie
2005	La famille Zappon	Henri	Amar Arhab; Fabrice Michelin	TV movie
2005	Confession d'un menteur	Romain Scanga	Didier Grousset	TV movie
2005	L'homme qui voulait passer à la télé		Amar Arhab; Fabrice Michelin	TV movie
2006	Le caprice des cigognes	Louis	Christiane Lehérissey	TV movie
2006	Fête de famille	Marc	Lorenzo Gabriele	TV mini-series
2006	Petits meurtres en famille	Inspector Larosière	Edwin Baily	TV mini-series
2007	Confidences	Eric	Laurent Dussaux	TV mini-series
2008	L'affaire Ben Barka	Leroy-Finville	Jean-Pierre Sinapi	TV movie
2008	Palizzi		Serge Hazanavicius	TV series (1 episode)
2009	Pas de toit sans moi	Paul	Guy Jacques	TV movie
2009	Éternelle	Lieutenant Gir	Didier Delaître	TV mini-series
2011	Le grand restaurant II	A transvestite	Gérard Pullicino	TV movie
2011	Un film sans...		Ronan Sinquin	TV series (1 episode)
2009-12	Les Petits Meurtres d'Agatha Christie	Inspector Larosière	Eric Woreth, Marc Angelo, ...	TV series (11 episodes)
2013	Un homme au pair	Maxime	Laurent Dussaux	TV movie
2013	Vaugand	Julien Bremont	Charlotte Brandström	TV series (1 episode)
2013	Scènes de ménages	Daniel Planchon	Francis Duquet	TV series (1 episode)
2014	Famille et turbulences	Tom Brousse	Eric Duret	TV movie
2014	Meurtres au Pays basque	Vincent Becker	Eric Duret	TV movie
2015	La boule noire	Guy Carnot	Denis Malleval	TV movie
2015	Les yeux ouverts	Francois	Lorraine Lévy	TV movie
2015	La mort d'Auguste	Ferdinand Mature	Denis Malleval	TV movie
2015	Meurtres à Guérande	Vincent Becker	Eric Duret	TV movie
2015	Accused	Pierre Adamas	Julien Despaux	TV series (1 episode)
2016	Frères à demi	Didier Vidal	Stéphane Clavier	TV movie
2016	Lebowitz contre Lebowitz	Simon Lebowitz	Frédéric Berthe & Christophe Barraud	TV series (2 episodes)
2017	À la dérive	Leroy	Philippe Venault	TV movie
2017	Mystère à l'Opéra	Julien Meursault	Léa Fazer	TV movie
2017	Le sang des îles d'or	Arthur Balestri	Claude-Michel Rome	TV movie
2017	Quand je serai grande... je te tuerai	Alexandre Chevin	Jean-Christophe Delpias	TV movie
2017	Cassandre	David Chalmont	Hervé Renoh	TV series (1 episode)
2018	Un mensonge oublié	Antoine Bricourt	Éric Duret	TV movie
2018	Les fantômes du Havre	Guy Rohan	Thierry Binisti	TV movie
2018-19	Crimes Parfaits	Renaud Delaunay	Christophe Douchand & François Guérin	TV series (4 episodes)
2019	Moi, Grosse	Jacques	Murielle Magellan	TV movie
2019	Les Ombres Rouges	Jacques Garnier	Corinne Bergas & Christophe Douchand	TV mini-series
2019	Le Bazar de la Charité	Auguste de Jeansin	Alexandre Laurent	TV mini-series
2019	Les Petits Meurtres d'Agatha Christie	Maurice Larosière	Nicolas Picard-Dreyfuss	TV series (1 episode)
2020	Avis de Tempête	Inspector Bertier	Bruno Garcia	TV movie
2020	Il était une fois à Monaco	Monsieur Zimmer	Frédéric Forestier	TV movie
2020	H24	Michel Garnier	Octave Raspail	TV series (1 episode)
2021	Liés pour la vie	Jérôme Maillard	Jean-Marc Rudnicki	TV movie
2021	La fille dans les bois	Eric	Marie-Hélène Copti	TV movie
2021	Une si longue nuit	Vlad	Jérémy Minui	TV mini-series
2022	Tous Inconnus	Himself	Nicolas Hourès	TV movie
2022	La maison d'en face	Hugo	Lionel Bailliu	TV mini-series
2022	L'amour (presque) parfait	Vincent	Pascale Pouzadoux	TV mini-series
2023	Une confession	Dr. Michel Flamand	Hélène Fillières	TV movie
2023	L'île prisonnière	Jaouen Leguen	Elsa Bennett & Hippolyte Dard	TV mini-series
2023	Un gars, une fille (au pluriel)	The guy	Sylvain Fusée	TV series (1 episode)
