= The Dilettante =

- Film poster
- Directed by: Pascal Thomas
- Written by: Jacques Lourcelles; Pascal Thomas
- Produced by: Frédéric Sichler; Pascal Thomas; Daniel Toscan du Plantier
- Starring: Catherine Frot
- Cinematography: Christophe Beaucarne
- Edited by: Catherine Dubeau; Sylvie Lager
- Music by: Reinhardt Wagner
- Distributed by: Goutte d'Or Distribution
- Release date: 7 July 1999
- Running time: 118 minutes
- Country: France
- Language: French
- Budget: $3.8 million
- Box office: $3 million

The Dilettante (French: La Dilettante) is a 1999 French comedy film directed by Pascal Thomas and starring Catherine Frot, Sébastien Cotterot and Barbara Schulz. The film was entered into the 21st Moscow International Film Festival where Catherine Frot won the Silver St. George for Best Actress.

== Cast ==
- Catherine Frot - Pierrette Dumortier
- Sébastien Cotterot - Éric
- Barbara Schulz - Nathalie
- Jacques Dacqmine - Delaunay
- Christian Morin - Edmond Rambert
- Jean Desailly - Edmond Thibault
- Armelle - The Judge
- Jean-François Balmer - Président of the tribunal
- Marie-Christine Barrault - Thérèse Rambert
- Didier Bezace - Father Ferro
- Gisèle Casadesus - The volunteer
- Odette Laure - Zoé de la Tresmondière
- Bernard Verley - André Ackerman
- Michèle Garcia - The college manager
- Sophie Mounicot - Gym teacher
- Gérard Hernandez - Police Inspector
