= Les Petits Meurtres d'Agatha Christie =

French television detective series

- Also known as: The Little Murders of Agatha Christle
- Genre: Comédie policière (comedic police crime drama)
- Created by: Anne Giafferi; Murielle Magellan
- Based on: Agatha Christie's detective fiction
- Starring: Series One: Antoine Duléry; Marius Colucci; Series Two: Samuel Labarthe; Blandine Bellavoir; Élodie Frenck; Series Three: Émilie Gavois-Kahn; Arthur Dupont; Chloé Chaudoye
- Country of origin: France
- Original language: French
- No. of series: 3
- No. of episodes: 11 | 27

Production
- Production location: France
- Running time: 100 minutes
- Production company: Escazai Films

Original release
- Network: France 2
- Release: 9 January 2009 – present

Related
- Petits Meurtres en Famille 2006 (4-part mini-series)

Les Petits Meurtres d'Agatha Christie is a French comédie policière (comedic police crime drama) television programme consisting of two series based loosely on Agatha Christie's works of detective fiction, first broadcast on France 2 on 9 January 2009. In English-speaking countries, Series One is titled "The Little Murders of Agatha Christie" and Series Two is titled "Agatha Christie's Criminal Games". Series One takes place in the 1930s with Commissaire (approximately DCI) Larosière (Antoine Duléry) and Inspecteur Lampion (Marius Colucci). Series Two is set in the late 1950s through early 1960s with Commissaire Swan Laurence (Samuel Labarthe), journalist Alice Avril (Blandine Bellavoir), and Laurence's secretary, Marlène Leroy (Élodie Frenck). Series One streams with English subtitles in the United States on Acorn TV and MHz Choice, Series Two streams with English subtitles in the United States on MHz Choice and in Australia on SBS. The thirty-eight episodes to the end of Series Two include adaptations of thirty-six of Christie's works.

A third series, with a new cast and set in 1970s France, was announced in 2019 and released starting in 2021. Although the title bearing Christie's name remained, most of the episodes were original stories "in the spirit of Christie's works" because the producer felt that the remaining books would be "too difficult to adapt", or because of rights issues in some cases.

== Series One: 1930s France (2009–2012) ==
=== Overview ===
Set in northern France in the 1930s, womanising and bombastic Commissaire Jean Larosière and his hapless junior officer Inspecteur Émile Lampion unravel a series of complicated murder cases to reveal the killers.

=== Cast and characters ===
==== Main ====
- Antoine Duléry as Commissaire Jean Larosière (11 episodes)
- Marius Colucci as Inspecteur Émile Lampion (11 episodes)

==== Support ====
- Serge Dubois as police officer (policier) Ménard (9 episodes)
- Olivier Carré as medical examiner (médecin légiste) Dr Verdure (5 episodes)

Guest cast
| No. in Series | Actor (character) |
| 1 | |
| 2 | |
| 3 | |
| 4 | |
| 5 | |
| 6 | |
| 7 | |
| 8 | |
| 9 | |
| 10 | |
| 11 | |

=== Episodes ===
| No. | Title | Christie adaptation | Directed by | Original release date |
|---|---|---|---|---|
| 1 | "Les meurtres ABC" | The A.B.C. Murders | Eric Woreth | 2009 |
| 2 | "Am stram gram" | Ordeal by Innocence | Stéphane Kappes | 2009 |
| 3 | "La plume empoisonnée" | The Moving Finger | Eric Woreth | 2009 |
| 4 | "La maison du péril" | Peril at End House | Eric Woreth | 2009 |
| 5 | "Le chat et les souris" | Cat Among the Pigeons | Eric Woreth | 2010 |
| 6 | "Je ne suis pas coupable" | Sad Cypress | Eric Woreth | 2010 |
| 7 | "Cinq petits cochons" | Five Little Pigs | Eric Woreth | 2011 |
| 8 | "Le flux et le reflux" | Taken at the Flood | Eric Woreth | 2011 |
(Blandine Bellavoir, who plays Albertine, appears as a main character in the second series.)
| 9 | "Un cadavre sur l'oreiller" | The Body in the Library | Eric Woreth | 2011 |
| 10 | "Un meurtre en sommeil" | Sleeping Murder | Eric Woreth | 2012 |
| 11 | "Le couteau sur la nuque" | Lord Edgware Dies | Renaud Bertrand | 2012 |

== Series Two: mid-1950s to 1960s France (2013–2020) ==
=== Overview ===
The action has moved to mid-1950s to 1960s Lille, France. Suave, razor-sharp, arrogant, and intolerant – Commissaire Swan Laurence investigates murders with the often unappreciated assistance of reporter Alice Avril and police secretary Marlène Leroy.

=== Cast and characters ===
==== Main ====
- Samuel Labarthe as Commissaire Swan Laurence (27 episodes)
- Blandine Bellavoir as La Voix du Nord journalist and feminist Alice Avril (27 episodes)
- Élodie Frenck as Laurence's Marilyn Monroe-esque police secretary Marlène Leroy (27 episodes)

==== Support ====
- Dominique Thomas as Commissaire Divisionnaire Ernest Tricard (27 episodes)
- Marie Berto as secretary then police officer Arlette Carmouille (5 episodes)
- Cyril Gueï as medical examiner (médecin légiste) Dr Timothée Glissant (13 episodes)
- Christophe Piret / François Godart as newspaper editor (rédacteur en chef) Robert Jourdeuil (2 / 15 episodes)
- Natacha Lindinger as medical examiner Dr Euphrasie Maillol (4 episodes)
- Éric Beauchamp as police "cop" (flic) Martin (16 episodes)
- Bubulle as Marlène's goldfish Bubulle (27 episodes). Bubulle is a series of fishes kept in the office by Marléne. When each fish expires, Laurence, knowing Marléne's attachment, secretly replaces it with a new fish. In episode 26, Laurence remarks "Bubulle 4".

Guest cast
| No. in Series | Actor (character) |
| 1 | Catherine Mouchet (Rose-Marie Bousquet), Olivier Rabourdin (Etienne Bousquet), Stéphane Caillard (Juliette), Solveig Maupu (Jaqueline Cassard), Shane Woodward (Jimmy White), Guillaume Bienvenu (Antonin Lambert), Vincent Londez (Léonard Jandel) |
| 2 | Élodie Navarre (Elvire Morenkova), Jean-Philippe Écoffey (Georges Leroy), Claude Perron (Claude Kerrigan), Antoine Oppenheim (Daniel Kerrigan), Hélène Médigue (Babette), Valentine Alaqui (Violette), Alexis Michalik (Jules Lavigne), Luis Inacio (Victor Lebrun) |
| 3 | Françoise Fabian (Alexina Laurence), Nathalie Richard (Geneviève Ranson), Jacqueline Bir (Émilie Longuet), Anne Azoulay (Charlotte Ségur), Olivier Chantreau (Louis Segur), Vincent Schmitt (Georges Siatidis), Isabelle de Hertogh (Bella Siatidis), Alexie Ribes (Daisy) |
| 4 | Alix Poisson (Suzanne Delavallée), Charlie Dupont (Roland Delavallée), Didier Vinson (André Delavallée), Arly Jover (Alma Sarrazin), Eric Caruso (Philippe Sarrazin), Luc Samaille (Alain Langevin), Laurence Flahault (Paulette Torbier) |
| 5 | |
| 6 | |
| 7 | |
| 8 | Élodie Frenck (Solange Vanilos), Nancy Tate (Mary Patterson), Blanche Cluzet (Marguerite Richard), Edouard Giard (Jean-Baptiste Millet), Lucile Marquis (Rose), Sandrine Salyères (N'Daye Sissoko), Charles Templon (Pierre), Charlotte Talpaert (Louise) |
| 9 | Philippe Nahon (Émile Deboucke), Anne Benoît (Annick Devassène), Marcelle Fontaine (Josiane Lallin), Alexandre Steiger (Jean Castor), Emilie Wiest (Sabine Toulemonde), Pierre Kiebbe (Baptiste) |
| 10 | Arnaud Perron (Robert Vasseur), Gilian Petrovski (Michael Doutremont), Eléonore Joncquez (Régine Molon), Serge Riaboukine (Dr. Léopold Santini), Mélissandre Fortumeau (Béatrice Santini), Jeanne Bournaud (Hélène Schmit) |
| 11 | Valeria Cavalli (Leticia Salvan/Charlotte Salvan), Juliette Plumecocq-Mech (Linda Greenblat), Christine Bonnard (Henriette), Blandine Pélissier (Odette), Annabelle Hettmann (Philippine Leroy), Clovis Fouin (Marcel Combet/Eugène Perrier), Honorine Magnier (Antoinette Combet/Emma Zontag) |
| 12 | |
| 13 | |
| 14 | |
| 15 | |
| 16 | Frédéric Pellegeay (Grégoire Vidal), Pierre Khorsand (Paul Courelle), Mona Walravens (Dany Courelle), Beatrice Rosen (Lucette Vidal), Christian Joubert (Albert Major) |
| 17 | |
| 18 | |
| 19 | |
| 20 | |
| 21 | |
| 22 | |
| 23 | |
| 24 | Bérénice Baoo (Clarisse Rodier), Arnaud Binard (Dr. Rodier), Maïra Schmitt (Adèle Rodier), Kevin Garnichat (Dr Nathan Steiner), Chloé Chaudoye (Marie Steiner), Barbara Monin (Dominique Lebrun), Emmanuel Bordier (Félix Jacquel) |
| 25 | |
| 26 | |
| 27 | Antoine Duléry (Commissaire Larosière), Anouchka Vingtier (Isabelle Grignan), Alain Duclos (Arthur Grignan), Claudine Vigreux (Madame Léotard), Ulrich Vanacker (Simon Wurtz) |

=== Episodes ===
| No. in series | Title | Christie adaptation | Directed by | Original release date |
|---|---|---|---|---|
| 1 | "Jeux de glaces" | They Do It With Mirrors | Eric Woreth | 2013 |
| 2 | "Meurtre au champagne" | Sparkling Cyanide | Eric Woreth | 2013 |
A movie star appears to commit suicide by poisoning her drink at a dinner party, but Laurence suspects that someone else put the poison there. Avril replaces her on the set while Laurence investigates.
| 3 | "Témoin Muet" | Dumb Witness | Marc Angelo | 2013 |
Laurence receives a letter dated months earlier from Émilie Longuet fearing that she will be murdered. On learning that the wealthy old woman is already dead, he orders an exhumation and autopsy which prove she had been poisoned. He and Avril both encounter ghosts who, despite his disbelief, help uncover secrets that are possible motives for all the resident family members, Mrs. Longuet's live-in personal assistant and, to Laurence's horror, his own mother whom he arrests before discovering that the weapon used in a second murder was planted in her room.
| 4 | "Pourquoi pas Martin?" | Why Didn't They Ask Evans? | Marc Angelo | 2013 |
| 5 | "Meurtre à la kermesse" | Hallowe'en Party | Eric Woreth | 2014 |
| 6 | "Cartes sur table" | Cards on the Table | Eric Woreth | 2014 |
A strange, wealthy man induces a dubious Laurence and Avril to attend a dinner party he is hosting with four other guests whom he suggests got away with murder, plus a self-proclaimed former member of France's secret service. When the host is murdered at the party, Laurence investigates. Two guests are subsequently murdered and Laurence himself becomes a suspect before determining the culprit.
| 7 | "Le crime ne paie pas" | Murder on the Links | Marc Angelo | 2014 |
| 8 | "Pension Vanilos" | Hickory Dickory Dock | Eric Woreth | 2015 |
(Élodie Frenck appears in a dual role as Marlène's sister Solange.)
| 9 | "Un meurtre est-il facile?" | Murder is Easy | Marc Angelo | 2015 |
Tired of living in poverty and being disrespected as a female journalist, Avril accepts a marriage proposal from Émile Deboucke, a much older man and very rich factory owner whom she barely knows. Avril moves into Deboucke's mansion and is given an executive position at his factory. After a series of murders at the factory and the attempted murders of herself and Marlène, Avril helps Laurence solve the crimes from within. Avril and Deboucke end their engagement amicably.
| 10 | "Madame Mac Ginty est morte" | Mrs McGinty's Dead | Didier Bivel, Eric Woreth | 2015 |
(Arnaud Perron, Blandine Bellavoir's partner, plays Alice's ex-husband.)
| 11 | "Murder Party" | A Murder is Announced | Eric Woreth | 2015 |
| 12 | "L'étrange enlèvement du petit Bruno" | The Adventure of Johnnie Waverly | Eric Woreth | 2016 |
A famous author and her husband receive anonymous letters threatening that their son will be kidnapped for ransom from their home at a specific time. Despite deploying heavy security, Laurence fails to prevent the kidnapping and is shot in the aftermath. He feigns death to pursue the case without the culprit's knowledge and, with major assistance from Avril, Marlène, and Dr. Maillol, is able to reveal all at his own fake funeral.
| 13 | "Le cheval pâle" | The Pale Horse | Olivier Panchot | 2016 |
| 14 | "L'affaire Protheroe" | The Murder at the Vicarage | Olivier Panchot | 2016 |
After a young secretary is found dead by hanging, Laurence quickly determines it was murder intended to look like suicide. Avril goes undercover as the secretary's replacement to help investigate.
| 15 | "La mystérieuse affaire de Styles" | The Mysterious Affair at Styles | Eric Woreth | 2016 |
A lady comes to see Laurence in distress because the owner of the popular beauty spa she manages is seeing a much younger man. Laurence is unwilling to get involved, but Marlène persuades Avril to visit the spa; they do so, but are mistaken for a lesbian couple. While there, Marlène finds a man's body at the bottom of the swimming pool, murdered. Laurence arrives at the spa to investigate. During the investigation, Avril discovers that the spa's owner, Emilie, is actually Avril's own mother. Shortly afterwards, Emilie also dies, which is clearly a second murder. Laurence's investigation into both murders turns up strange happenings, such as Emilie's habit of drinking the blood of children, a surrogate pregnancy of one of the spa staff who Emilie recently adopted and wrote into her will, and the alluring wife of a government minister who sedated Emilie to cover up her own affair with Emilie's husband.
| 16 | "Albert Major parlait trop" | A Caribbean Mystery | Eric Woreth | 2016 |
While in hospital for injuries incurred in an accident, Avril encounters famous crime author Albert Major but fails to interest Laurence in the author's claim to be writing a book exposing a "perfect murder" that he witnessed years ago. Major becomes the first of several victims murdered grotesquely in the hospital. Avril discovers a secret hospital area with strange goings-on possibly related to the murders, but when Laurence finds no evidence in the room he decides it was just her head injuries causing her imagination to run wild. Laurence eventually realises that everything is indeed connected, catches the culprit, and reaches Avril, the next intended victim, just as she is about to succumb to a poisoned intravenous drip.
| 17 | "L'Homme au complet marron" | The Man in the Brown Suit | Rodolphe Tissot | 2017 |
| 18 | "Le miroir se brisa" | The Mirror Crack'd from Side to Side | Rodolphe Tissot | 2017 |
| 19 | "Crimes haute couture" | Third Girl | Nicolas Picard-Dreyfuss | 2017 |
| 20 | "Crime de Noël" | not adapted from a Christie story | Rodolphe Tissot | 2017 |
| 21 | "Drame en trois actes" | Three Act Tragedy | Nicolas Picard-Dreyfuss | 2018 |
(Samuel Labarthe appears in a dual role as acting teacher Herbert Michel.)
| 22 | "Meurtres en solde" | Hercule Poirot's Christmas | Didier Bivel | 2018 |
(Alexandre Labarthe, who plays Laurence's son, is Samuel Labarthe's son. This adaptation has no Christmas theme.)
| 23 | "Mélodie mortelle" | The Sittaford Mystery | Christophe Campos | 2018 |
| 24 | "Ding Dingue Dong" | Evil Under the Sun | Christophe Campos | 2019 |
When Marlène stumbles into Laurence's office disheveled, disoriented, and deemed to be suffering from depression, he has her admitted to a private psychiatric clinic where he is investigating a murder. But Laurence is arrested as the prime suspect of a second murder at the clinic because he has been having an affair with the victim, the wife of the head of the clinic, and is believed to have been on the premises at the time. Avril goes undercover as a nurse to investigate while Laurence is in jail but he soon joins her by feigning insanity to get himself admitted to the clinic. Marlène's sharp eye for fashion provides the critical clue that puts Laurence on the right track to reveal the murderers.
| 25 | "L'Heure zéro" | Towards Zero | Nicolas Picard-Dreyfuss | 2019 |
| 26 | "Rendez-vous avec la mort" | Appointment with Death | Nicolas Picard-Dreyfuss | 2019 |
| 27 | "Un Cadavre au petit déjeuner" | not adapted from a Christie story | Nicolas Picard-Dreyfuss | 2020 |
The Series Two Finale is a musical self-parody, with all the cast breaking out into song and dance throughout. After a night of drunken revelry that she cannot recall, Avril awakens in bed next to the corpse of young man with a knife in his chest. Laurence has resigned as Commissaire and is about to leave for Washington to work for the FBI but, joined by Marlène, Glissant, and Tricard, he goes to extraordinary lengths, including illegalities, to figure out who is trying to frame Avril for murder and to keep her out of the clutches of her chief antagonists: Laurence's replacement, the psychotic nephew of former Commissaire Larosière, and Carmouille, although she eventually saves the day. (Antoine Duléry appears as the nephew of Series One's Commissaire Larosière. Original musical-comedy episode; first aired in Italy in 2019, Australia in 2020, and in France in October 2020.)

== Series Three: 1970s France ==
A third series, with a new cast and set in France in the 1970s, was announced in 2019.

The first and third episodes are adaptations of, respectively, Endless Night and The Hollow. Other episodes are original stories; according to the producer, they are in the "spirit of Agatha Christie".

=== Overview ===
The third series is set in the 1970s, again in Lille, France. Commissaire Annie Gréco is aided by police inspector Max Beretta and psychologist Rose Bellecour.

=== Cast and characters ===
==== Main ====
- Émilie Gavois-Kahn as Commissaire Annie Gréco
- Arthur Dupont as Inspector Maxime "Max" Beretta
- Chloé Chaudoye as psychologist Rose Bellecour

==== Support ====
- Saverio Maligno as Inspector Râteau
- Alexandre Russo as Inspector Cassard
- Quentin Baillot as Commissaire divisionnaire Servan Legoff
- Benoît Moret as medical examiner (médecin légiste) Jacques Blum
- Nicolas Lumbreras as Bob, a hippie hotel owner
- Christèle Tual as Barbara Bellecour, Rose's mother
- Grégoire Oestermann as Arnaud Bellecour, Rose's father

=== Episodes ===
| No. | Title | Christie adaptation | Directed by | Original release date |
|---|---|---|---|---|
| 1 | "La Nuit qui ne finit pas" | Endless Night | Nicolas Picard-Dreyfuss | 2021 |
| 2 | "La Chambre noire" | N/A | Nicolas Picard-Dreyfuss | 2021 |
| 3 | "Le Vallon" | The Hollow | Alexandre Coffre | 2021 |
| 4 | "Mourir sur scène" | N/A | Nicolas Picard-Dreyfuss | 2021 |
| 5 | "Quand les souris dansent" | N/A | Alexandre Coffre | 2022 |
| 6 | "Jusqu'à ce que la mort nous sépare" | N/A | Nicolas Picard-Dreyfuss | 2022 |
| 7 | "Meurtres du troisième type" | N/A | Bertrand Soulier and Hélène Lombard | 2022 |
| 8 | "En un claquement de doigt" | N/A | Émilie Deleuze | 2022 |
| 9 | "Mortel Karma" | N/A | Christophe Douchand | 2023 |
| 10 | "Meurtres au Pensionnat" | N/A | Christophe Douchand | 2023 |

== Notes ==
- A distinct four-part mini-series, "Petits Meurtres en Famille", adapted from Hercule Poirot's Christmas, was released in 2006. Although Larosière and Lampion are the main characters (played by the same actors), this mini-series is not a prequel or sequel to the later series. However, in this earlier miniseries, Larosière knows who his father is and actually meets him in the story, but in "Un meurtre en sommeil" (Sleeping Murder), Episode 10 of Season 1 of "Les Petits Meurtres d'Agatha Christie", Larosière says he does this know who his father is and is going to seek out his identity.
- Laurence drives a Facel Vega Facellia FA red Bordeaux coupe.

== Complete cast ==
Cast of Series One and Series Two
| Actor | Character | Episodes | Year |
| Antoine Duléry | Jean Larosière; Larosière's nephew | 11; 1 | 2009–2012; 2020 |
| Marius Colucci | Émile Lampion | 11 | 2009–2012 |
| Blandine Bellavoir | Albertine; Alice Avril | 1; 27 | 2011; 2013–2020 |
| Samuel Labarthe | Swan Laurence | 27 | 2013–2020 |
| Élodie Frenck | Marlène Leroy | 27 | 2013–2020 |
| Dominique Thomas | Ernest Tricard | 27 | 2013–2020 |
| Christophe Piret | Guillaume Parisot; Robert Jourdeuil | 1; 2 | 2012; 2013 |
| François Godart | Robert Jourdeuil | 15 | 2013–2019 |
| Éric Beauchamp | Martin | 16 | 2013–2018 |
| Serge Dubois | Ménard | 9 | 2009–2012 |
| Olivier Carré | Verdure; Roger Bessan | 5; 1 | 2010–2012; 2019 |
| Bubulle | Marlène's goldfish Bubulle | 27 | 2013–2020 |
| Flore Bonaventura; Alice Isaaz | Juliette Larosière | 1; 1 | 2010; 2012 |
| Anne Benoît | Madame Daste; Annick Devassene | 1; 1 | 2009; 2015 |
| Hélène Vincent | Kristin | 1 | 2009 |
| Lucie Lucas | Esther | 1 | 2009 |
| Pascal Elso | Léopold Vallabrègues | 1 | 2009 |
| Corinne Masiero | Angélique | 1 | 2009 |
| Denis Lavant | André Custe | 1 | 2009 |
| Frédéric Pierrot | Jean Villiers | 1 | 2009 |
| Robinson Stévenin | Jean | 1 | 2009 |
| Françoise Bertin | Emilie Dubreuil | 1 | 2009 |
| Lannick Gautry | Mathieu Vidal | 1 | 2010 |
| Isabelle Candelier | Christine Boisseau | 1 | 2010 |
| Guilaine Londez | Mademoiselle Thuleau | 1 | 2010 |
| Mata Gabin | Esméralda | 1 | 2011 |
| Jean-Marie Winling | Pierre Fougères | 1 | 2012 |
| Patrick Descamps | Chesnais | 1 | 2012 |
| Françoise Fabian | Alexina Laurence | 1 | 2013 |
| Claude Perron | Claude Kerrigan | 1 | 2013 |
| Charlie Dupont | Roland Delavallée | 1 | 2013 |
| Alexis Michalik | Jules Lavigne | 1 | 2013 |
| Isabelle de Hertogh | Bella Siatidis | 1 | 2013 |
| Dominique Pinon | Hubert Petitpont | 1 | 2014 |
| Natacha Lindinger | Euphrasie Maillol | 4 | 2014 |
| Nicolas Vaude | Stanislas | 1 | 2014 |
| Alban Lenoir | Paul Coupet | 1 | 2014 |
| Philippe Nahon | Emile Deboucke | 1 | 2015 |
| Serge Riaboukine | Léopold Santini | 1 | 2015 |
| Cyril Guei | Dr Timothée Glissant | 13 | 2016–2020 |
| Sophie Cattani | Eve Constantin | 1 | 2016 |
| Philippe Rebbot | Dr Locart | 1 | 2018 |
| Marie Berto | Arlette Carmouille | 5 | 2016–2020 |
| Barbara Schulz | Audrey Fontaine | 1 | 2019 |
| Nuno Lopes | Maxime Beaumont | 1 | 2019 |
| Mireille Herbstmeyer | Clémence Berg | 1 | 2019 |

== See also ==
- List of French television series
