= François Châtelet =

French philosopher

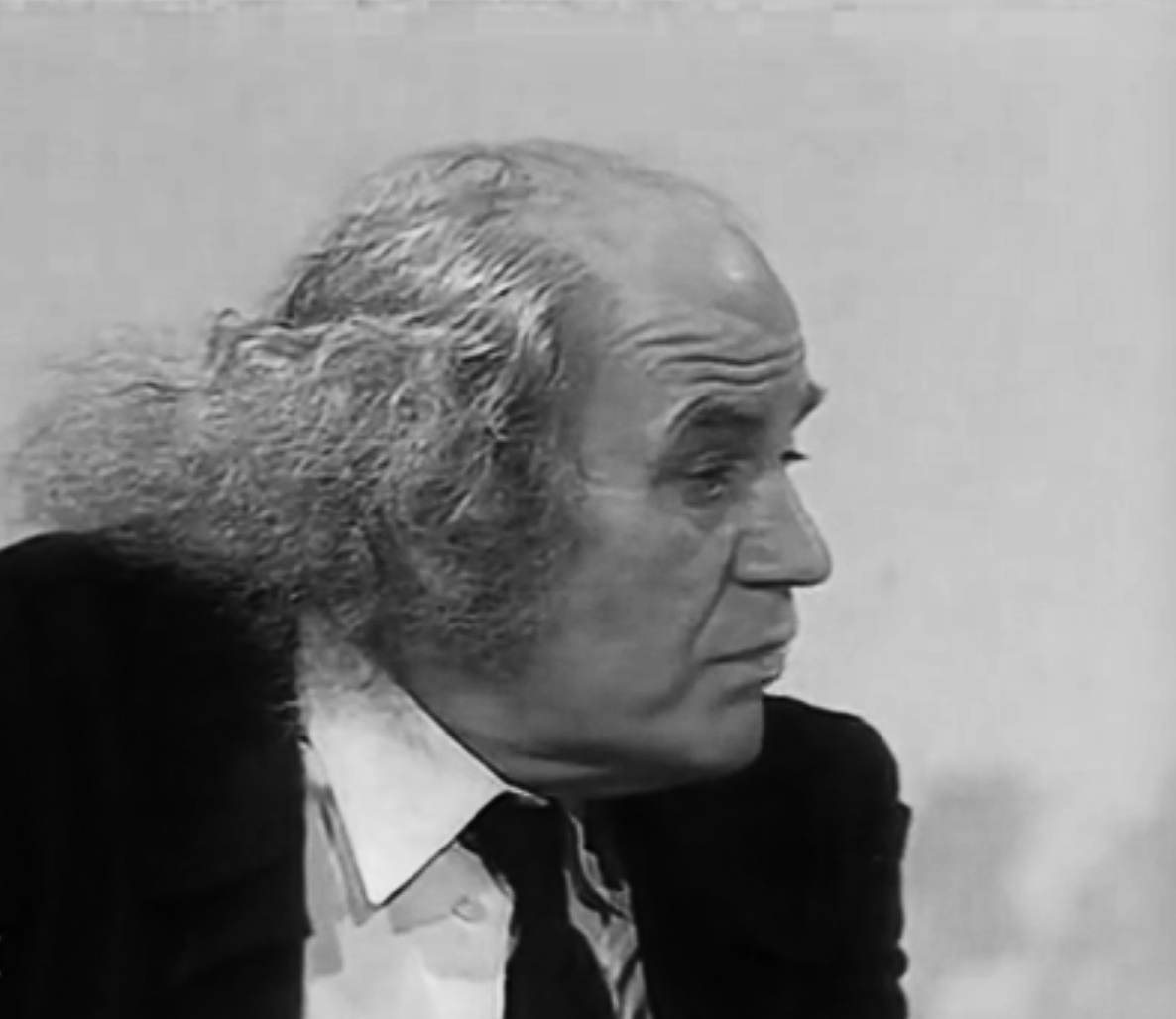
- Born: Michel François Jacques Châtelet; April 27, 1925; Paris, France
- Died: December 26, 1985 (aged 60); Paris, France
- Spouse: Noëlle Châtelet

Education
- Education: University of Paris
- Doctoral advisor: Jean Hyppolite

Philosophical work
- Era: 20th-century philosophy
- Region: Western philosophy
- School: Continental philosophy Post-structuralism; Rationalism; Marxism
- Institutions: University of Paris VIII
- Doctoral students: Guy Hocquenghem; Luce Irigaray; Robert Linhart; Jean-Marie Vincent
- Main interests: History of philosophy; Political philosophy; Athenian democracy; Platonism; Kantianism; Hegelianism; Reason; Statism
- Notable ideas: Periclean democracy; Anti-Kantianism; Anti-Platonism

Michel François Jacques Châtelet (French: [ʃɑtlɛ]; April 27, 1925 – December 26, 1985) was a French historian of philosophy and political philosophy, and philosopher. He was the husband of philosopher Noëlle Châtelet. Châtelet was also a co-founder of the influential French political philosophy journal Arguments.

== Biography ==
Châtelet was born in Paris on April 27, 1925. The son of a tram operator for the Société des transports parisiens, (which would later become the Compagnie du chemin de fer métropolitain de Paris and subsequently the RATP), Châtelet characterized his upbringing as "petite bourgeoisie". After studying at the Lycée Janson-de-Sailly and subsequently the Lycée Claude-Bernard, he relocated to Lille to complete his secondary studies. After graduating with his Baccalauréat in 1943, he returned to Paris to enroll at the Sorbonne, where he was a student of the philosopher Gaston Bachelard. It was during this time that he became acquainted with the works of Karl Marx, and the Vietnamese Marxist philosopher and phenomenologist Tran Duc Thao. Finding further inspiration in Jean-Paul Sartre's L'Imaginaire, Châtelet entered a period of what he referred to as "Hegelo-Marxist Existentialism." In 1948, he passed the aggrégation de philosophie, a competitive exam used for the recruitment of philosophy teachers and professors in the French education system. Following his graduation, Châtelet and his fiancée, Janine Marie Mathon, moved to Algeria, where he taught at the Lycée Lamoricière in Oran while Mathon taught at the affiliated girls lycée. In 1951, Châtelet took a post at the Lycée Carnot in Tunis, teaching the hypokhâgne, before returning to Paris in 1954 to teach at the Lycée d'Amiens. He subsequently became a hypokhâgne teacher at the prestigious Lycée Fénelon in Paris.

In 1950, he began his doctoral studies under Jean Hyppolite, initially wishing to complete a thesis titled "Histoire et signification de l'idée de Révolution," (History and Meaning of the Idea of Revolution). Ultimately, his doctoral thesis was titled "La formation de la pensée historienne dans la philosophie de la Grèce classique de la fin des guerres médiques à la bataille de Chéronée" (The formation of historical thought in Classical Greek philosophy from the end of the Greco-Persian Wars to the Battle of Chaeronea). Completing his thesis in 1959 Châtelet was awarded a Doctor of Letters in 1961, when his complimentary thesis, Logos et praxis: Recherches sur la signification théorique du marxisme (Logos and Praxis: Research on the Theoretical Significance of Marxism) was published by Les Éditions de Minuit.

From a young age, Châtelet was actively engaged in current affairs, putting up posters and distributing leaflets – some of which had Trotskyist undertones – around the Lycées at which he studied. He was deeply influenced by the thought of Alexandre Kojève and Éric Weil, who he considered his mentors. A member of the Communist Party of France, he withdrew from the party in 1956 in response to the Soviet invasion of Hungary, and actively campaigned for the decolonization of the Maghreb during his time teaching there.

Along with Michel Foucault and Gilles Deleuze, he is one of the founders of the department of philosophy at the Paris 8 University Vincennes (also known as University of Paris VIII), which was established in the aftermath of the May 1968 student protests across France, and was later relocated from Vincennes to the northern Parisian commune of Saint-Denis. Along with Jean-Pierre Vernant, he and joined the department of philosophy at the University of São Paulo in 1971 as a form of protest to Brazilian military government's imprisonment of most of the department's faculty. In 1983, he co-founded the Collège international de philosophie (International College of Philosophy), which is described as being at "the forefront of militant and engaged critical thinking," and has sought to "relocate philosophy at the intersection of science, politics, psychoanalysis, art and literature, jurisprudence, and economy." Châtelet's philosophy links thought and action, engaging in a restless combat with his contemporaries. He also taught in high schools and pre-university classes throughout his career, and occasionally participated in the seminars offered by Gilles Deleuze, with whom he was close friends.

Châtelet's conception of philosophy makes him more of a historian of philosophy than a philosopher. At the same time, his work demonstrates that the history of philosophy is always a politics of philosophy and history of politics as well. Châtelet argues in La philosophie des professeurs (which can be translated as either "The Philosophy of Teachers" or "The Philosophy of Professors") that the practice of philosophy can never be separated from how it is taught. Instead, he asserts the two are always intimately connected. In Une histoire de la raison (A History of Reason), he shows the role of philosophy in the constitution of modern Western rationality. His work Platon (Plato) is a formidable invitation-initiation to the thought of the ancient Greek philosopher.

In 1982, Châtelet was diagnosed with lung cancer, receiving a tracheotomy the following year. His illness left him debilitated and Châtelet remained homebound until his death in 1985. During this period, Deleuze and his wife Fanny visited Châtelet weekly. The latter's illness had a profound impact on his friend. In 1995, Deleuze wrote a letter to his friend, painter and performance art organizer Jean-Jacques Lebel, stating that he "didn't want to live through what François had lived through." Deleuze would take his own life several weeks later.

In 2023, his work appeared in English translation for the first time with a translation of his "Classical Greece, Reason, and the State" by Adam E. Foster in volume 38 of Parrhesia: A Journal of Critical Philosophy.

== Personal life ==
François Châtelet married his first wife, Janine Marie Mathon, in 1948 while living in Oran. The two divorced in June 1957.

In December 1968, he married Noëlle Jospin, whose brother Lionel Jospin served as Prime Minister of France between 1997 and 2002 during the presidency of Jacques Chirac. The two remained married for the rest of Châtelet's life. Together, they had a son, Antoine.

== Works ==
=== Monographs ===
- Périclès et son siècle (Pericles and his age) (1960)
- La naissance de l'histoire : la formation de la pensée historienne en Grèce, (The birth of history: the formation of historical thought in Greece) (1961)
- Logos et praxis: recherches sur la signification théorique du marxisme (Logos and praxis: research on the theoretical significance of Marxism) (1962)
- Platon (Plato) (1965)
- Hegel (1968)
- La philosophie des professeurs (The Philosophy of Professors) (1970)
- Histoire de la philosophie (History of Philosophy) (1972–1973) — 8 volumes
- Profil d'une œuvre : « Le Capital » (livre 2) (Profile of a work: Das Kapital (book 2)) (1976)
- Les Années de démolition (The Demolition Years) (1976)
- Questions, objections (Questions, objections) (1979)
- Une histoire de la raison (A History of Reason) (1992)
- Logos et Praxis (Logos and Praxis) (2006)

=== English translations ===
- "Classical Greece, Reason, and the State," trans. Adam E. Foster, Parrhesia: A Journal of Critical Philosophy 38 (2023): 21–43.

=== Co-authored works ===
- La Révolution sans modèle (Revolution without a model) (1974), with Gilles Lapouge and Oliver Revault d'Allones.
- Les marxistes et la politique (Marxists and the political) (1975), with Évelyne Pisier and Jean-Marie Vincent.
- Chronique des idées perdues (The chronicle of lost ideas) (1977), with André Akoun.
- Les conceptions politiques du xx^{e} siècle (Political conceptions of the 20th century) (1982), with Évelyne Pisier.
- Histoire des conceptions politiques (History of political conceptions) (1982), with Éveline Pisier and Olivier Duhamel.
- Dictionnaire des œuvres politiques (Dictionary of political works) (1986), with Éveline Pisier and Olivier Duhamel.
