= Catherine Frot =

French actress (born 1956)

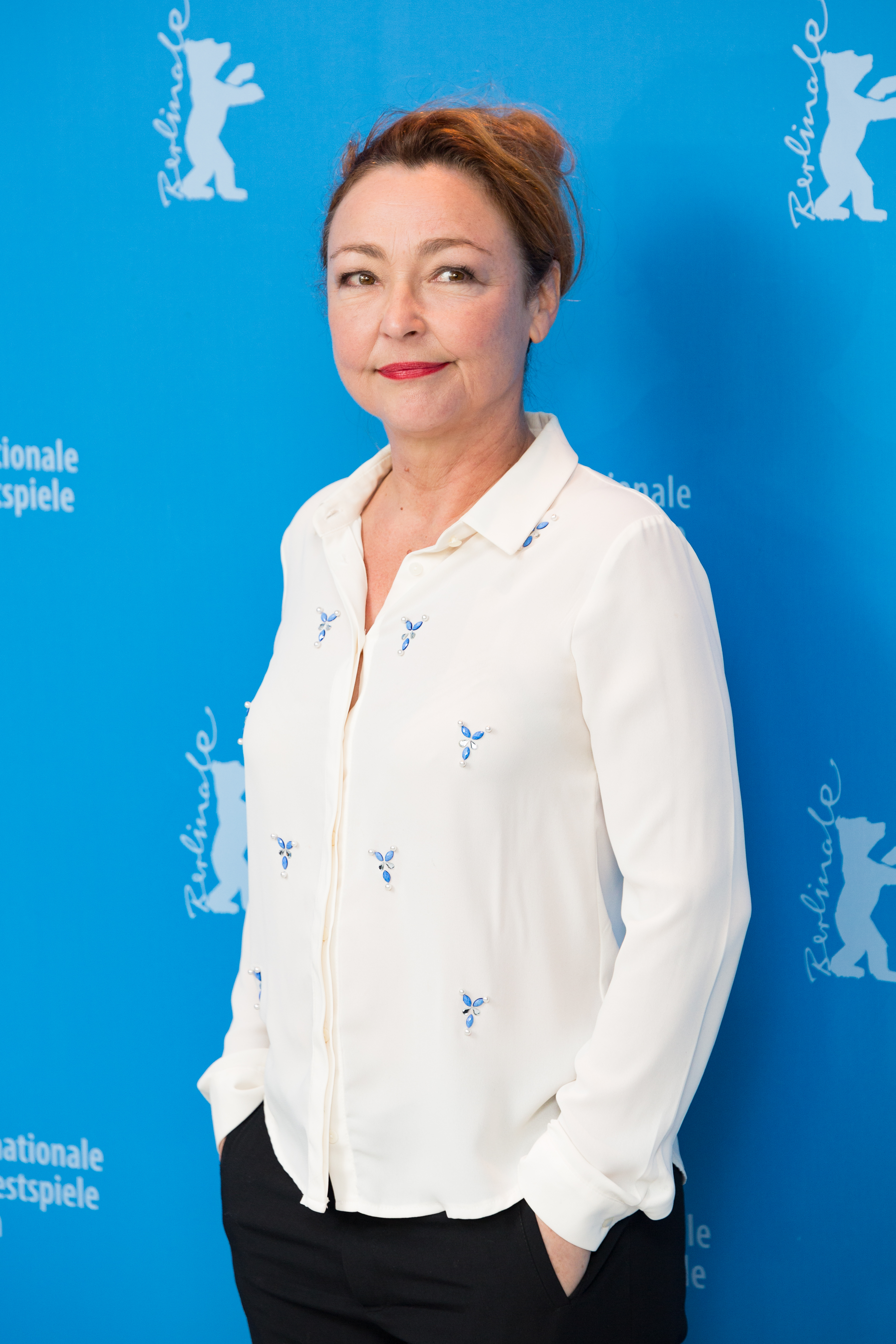
- Frot at the 67th Berlin Film Festival in 2017
- Born: 1 May 1956 (age 70); Paris, France
- Occupation: Actress
- Years active: 1975–present

Catherine Frot (French pronunciation: [katʁin fʁo]; born 1 May 1956) is a French actress. A 10-time César Award nominee, she won the awards for Best Actress for Marguerite (2015) and Best Supporting Actress for Family Resemblances (1996). Her other films include Le Dîner de Cons (1998), La Dilettante (1999), and Haute Cuisine (2012).

== Early life ==
Frot was born in Paris, France, the daughter of an engineer and a mathematics teacher. Her younger sister, Dominique, was also an actress. Catherine demonstrated comic talent at an early age, and enrolled in the Versailles conservatory when she was 14, and was still in school. In 1974, she began her education at the Rue Blanche school, and afterwards took up full-time studies at the conservatory.

== Career ==
In 1975, Frot appeared at the Festival d'Avignon with the Compagnie du Chapeau Rouge (Red Hat Company), which she founded with the help of others. From then on, she put all her energy into theatre performances in roles such as the Présidente de Tourvel in the play Les Liaisons dangereuses in 1987. She performed in a number of classical plays such as La Cerisaie, directed by Peter Brook in 1982, and La Mouette directed by Pierre Pradinas in 1985.

In films, Frot won the César Award for Best Actress in a Supporting Role in 1996, for playing Yolande, the sweet silly wife of a provincial bully, in Cédric Klapisch's Un air de famille, and was funny and moving as a wealthy, rebellious nuisance in La Dilettante (1999). In the film 7 ans de mariage, she played a prudish banker, wife, and mother, who is drawn by her bored, sexually frustrated husband into the world of Parisian clubs échangistes ("wife-swapping clubs"). She is an officer of the Ordre national du Mérite.

== Filmography ==
Year	Title	Role	Notes
1975	Les Charmes de l'été	Béatrice	TV mini-series
1975	Les Compagnons d'Eleusis	The guardian	TV series
1977	L'Enlèvement du régent - Le chevalier d'Harmental	Bathilde	Telefilm
1980	Mont-Oriol	Charlotte Oriol	Telefilm
1980	My American Uncle	Young Arlette Le Gall	
1980	Psy	Babette	
1980	La Ville Noire	Tonine	Telefilm
1981	Les Babas Cool	Véronique	
1981	Mon meilleur Noël	Claude's aunt	TV series
1981—1982	Cinéma 16	Nathalie / Juliette	TV series
1982	La Cerisaie	Donniacha	Telefilm
1982	Guy de Maupassant	Mouche	
1982	Egmont	Claire / Klare	Telefilm
1982	Si je réponds pas, c'est que je suis mort		Short film
1982	Les Atours de l'œil foudre		Short film
1982	La Nuit du lac		Short film
1983	A Stone in the Mouth	Jacky	
1983	Orpheus	Eurydice	Telefilm
1984	Les Amis de monsieur Gazon	Patricia	Telefilm
1984	Les Timides aventures d'un laveur de carreaux	Jacqueline	Telefilm
1984	Jacques le fataliste et son maître	Sophie	Telefilm
1984	Du sel sur la peau	Charlotte	
1985	Elsa, Elsa	Juliette	
1985	Escalier C	Béatrice	Nominated—César Award for Best Supporting Actress
1985	Mélodie pour un cafard		Short film
1986	L'inconnue de Vienne	Juliette	Telefilm
1987	L'Heure Simenon	Louise	TV series
1987	Sorceress	Cécile	
1987	La Voix du désert		Short film
1988	La Face de l'ogre	Marion	Telefilm
1989	Personne ne m'aime		Telefilm
1989	Chambre à part	Babette	
1990	Tom et Lola	Catherine (Tom's mother)	
1990	Bienvenue à bord !	La blonde / Prostitute	
1990	Sésame, ouvre-toi!		Telefilm
1991	Haute tension	Fabienne	TV series
1991	Sushi Sushi	The banker	
1992	Juste avant l'orage	Irène	
1992	Vieille canaille	Marylin	
1992	Les Cinq Dernières Minutes	Jacqueline Cauvin	TV series
1993	Vent d'est	Martha Hubner	
1993	Ma petite Mimi	Mimi	Telefilm
1994	I Can't Sleep	Woman With Bookcase (cameo appearance)	
1994	Un été à l'envers	Marie	Telefilm
1994	Une femme dans l'ennui		Short film
1995	Sa dernière lettre	Cécile	Telefilm
1995	Cycle Simenon	Anna	TV series
1996	Family Resemblances	Yolande	César Award for Best Supporting Actress
1997	Un homme	Gisèle	Telefilm
1997	Quand j'étais p'tit	Suzanne	Telefilm
1997	Le Dernier Été	Béatrice Bretty	Telefilm
1997	Les Lauriers sont coupés	Josy	Telefilm
1998	Le Dîner de Cons	Marlène Sasseur	Nominated—César Award for Best Supporting Actress
1998	Paparazzi	Evelyne Bordoni	
1998	Just Between Us	Hélène	
1998	Dormez, je le veux !	Marie-Louise, the mother	
1998	Je vais t'apprendre la politesse	The Baroness	TV series
1998	It Would Only Take a Bridge		Short film
1999	À vot'service	Fanny	
1999	The New Eve	Isabelle	
1999	The Dilettante	Pierrette Dumortier	Best Actress Award (21st Moscow International Film Festival); Nominated—César Award for Best Actress
1999	Inséparables	Gisèle	
1999	Dessine-moi un jouet	Antoinette Bomme	Telefilm
2001	Chaos	Hélène	Nominated—César Award for Best Actress
2001	Day Off	Sophie	
2002	Cavale	Jeanne Rivet	
2002	Après la vie	Jeanne Rivet	
2002	Un couple épatant	Jeanne Rivet	
2002	L'Enfant éternel	Carole	Telefilm
2003	Chouchou	Nicole Milovavovich	
2003	Married for 7 Years	Audrey	
2004	Eros Therapy	Agnès	
2004	Viper in the Fist	Paule "Folcoche" Rézeau	
2004	Les Sœurs fâchées	Louise Mollet	
2005	Boudu	Yseult	Nominated - Globes de Cristal Award for Best Actress
2005	Mon petit doigt m'a dit...	Prudence Beresford	
2006	The Page Turner	Ariane Fouchécourt	Nominated—César Award for Best Actress
2006	Le Passager de l'été	Monique	
2007	Odette Toulemonde	Odette Toulemonde	Nominated—César Award for Best Actress
2007	L'Affaire Christian Ranucci : le Combat d'une mère	Héloïse Ranucci	Telefilm
2008	Mark of an Angel	Elsa Valentin	Nominated—Lumière Award for Best Actress; Nominated—Globes de Cristal Award for Best Actress
2008	Crime Is Our Business	Prudence Beresford	Nominated—César Award for Best Actress
2009	Le Vilain	Maniette	
2009	Happy End	Ombeline	
2010	Le Mystère	Valérie	
2010	Imogène McCarthery	Imogène	
2011	Fabienne	Fabienne Bourrier	
2012	Bowling	Catherine	
2012	Partners in Crime	Prudence Beresford	
2012	Haute Cuisine	Hortense Laborie	Nominated—César Award for Best Actress; Nominated—Lumière Award for Best Actress
2015	Marguerite	Marguerite Dumont	César Award for Best Actress; Lumière Award for Best Actress
2016	La Tueuse caméléon		
2016	Heureux en France		
2017	The Midwife	Claire	
2020	Home Front		
2020	The Rose Maker (La fine fleur)	Eve	
2024	Misericordia (Miséricorde)	Martine	
