= Jean Périmony =

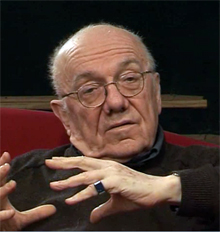

Jean Périmony (2 March 1931 – 9 April 2017) was a French comedian, educator, theater director, and costume designer. He was born in Dole, Jura.

== Career ==
Périmony was known for working with assistant director Robert Manuel and then with Henri Rollan. He created the Cie du Villiers (1969) and the Festival Molière at the Théâtre Trévise in Paris (1977).

Périmony opened his drama school in September 1960 and taught at the Conservatory of Orléans from 1983 through 1986. He was served in the House of the Legion of Honor from 1984 through 2000 and the INA from 1984 to 1990. He was also Secretary General of the Catholic Union of Theater and Music from 1990 to 1996.

== Personal life ==
Périmony was married to literary agent Marie-Cécile Renauld until his death in 2017. They had three children.

Périmony died on 9 April 2017 in Paris, France, at the age of 86.
