= Barbara Schulz =

French actress (born 1972)

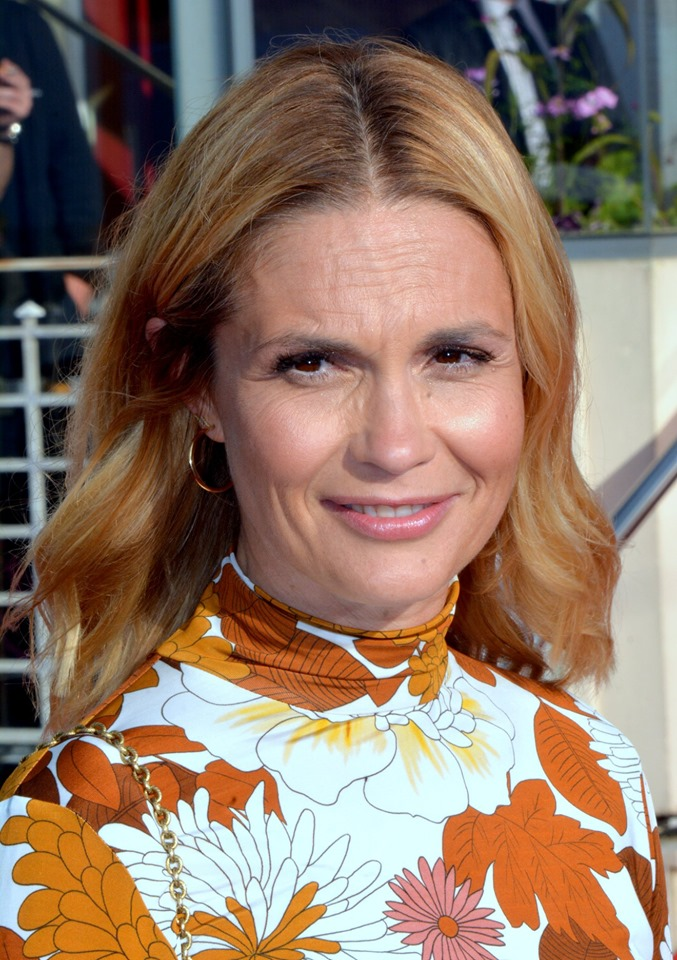
- Barbara Schulz in 2019
- Born: 15 March 1972 (age 54); Talence, France
- Occupation: Actress
- Years active: 1993-present

Barbara Schulz is a French actress who won the Prix Suzanne Bianchetti in 2001. She was nominated for the César Award for Most Promising Actress for the 1999 film La Dilettante.

For her performances on the stage, Schulz has been nominated several times for the Molière Award, winning in 2001 in the category Best Female Newcomer (Molière de la révélation théâtrale) for the play Joyeuses Pâques.

In 2011, she moved from France to New York City, where she was cast in an episode of the short-lived TV series Pan Am as an Italian woman spying for the USSR, in a recurring role.

== Filmography ==
- 1999 : The Dilettante
- 2001 : Un aller simple
- 2004 : Colette, une femme libre, directed by Nadine Trintignant (TV Mini-Series)
- 2004 : Textiles
- 2004 : San-Antonio
- 2009 : Bank Error in Your Favour
- 2015 : Le mystère du lac, TV Mini-Series
- 2016 : Hidden Kisses
- 2023 : Bernadette
- 2023 : I3P (Netflix série)

== Television ==
- 2013 : The Blacklist, episode "The Courier"
