= Pascal Thomas =

French screenwriter and film director (born 1945)

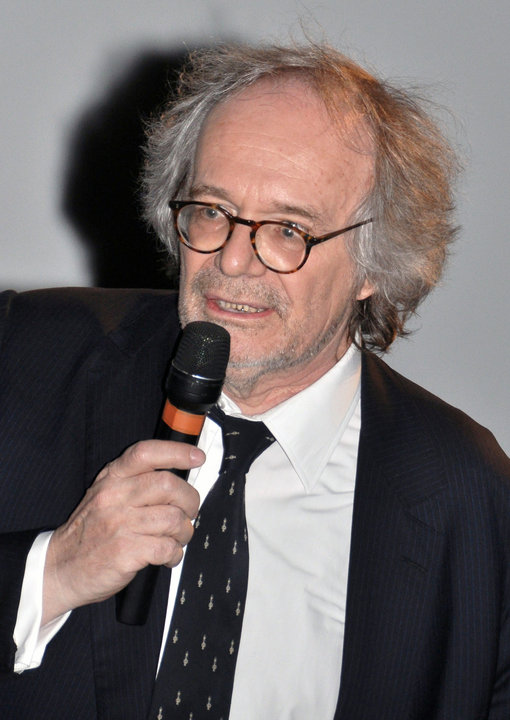
- Pascal Thomas in 2010
- Born: 2 April 1945 (age 81); Montargis, France
- Occupations: Film director, screenwriter
- Years active: 1971-present

Pascal Thomas (born 2 April 1945) is a French screenwriter and film director. His 1999 comedy film The Dilettante was entered into the 21st Moscow International Film Festival.

== Selected filmography ==
- Pleure pas la bouche pleine! (1973)
- Les Maris, les Femmes, les Amants (1989)
- La pagaille (1991)
- La Dilettante (1999)
- Day Off (2001)
- Mon petit doigt m'a dit... (2005)
- L'heure zéro (2007)
- Le crime est notre affaire (2008)
- Valentin Valentin (2015)
