= Dewaere =

Dewaere is a surname. Notable people with the surname include:

- Lola Dewaere (born 1979), French actress, daughter of Patrick
- Patrick Dewaere (1947–1982), French film actor
  - Prix Patrick Dewaere, film industry award
