= Émilie Gavois-Kahn =

French actress

- Born: Paris, France
- Occupation: Actress
- Years active: 1997–present

Émilie Gavois-Kahn is a French actress.

== Theater ==
Year	Title	Author	Director
1997	A Month in the Country	Ivan Turgenev	Andrei Smirnov
2005	La Belle et les Bêtes	Alfredo Arias	Alfredo Arias
2006	Petits Meurtres en famille	François Roux	François Roux
2006-07	Un et un Feydeau !	Georges Feydeau	Élise Roche
2007	Celebration	Harold Pinter	Alexandre Zeff
2009	Chat en poche	Georges Feydeau	Marion Lécrivain
2010-11	The Green Bird	Carlo Gozzi	Sandrine Anglade

== Filmography ==
=== Cinema ===
Year	Title	Role	Director	Notes
2001	Tête brûlée		Vincent Lebrun	Short
2003	Swimming Pool	Waitress at Cafe	François Ozon	
2006	Lou	Lou	Martin Geisler	Short
2007	Les ambitieux	Lucile	Catherine Corsini	
2009	Coco Before Chanel	Alternate seamstress	Anne Fontaine	
2009	Alpha	The client #1	Sanford McCoy	Short
2009	Corpus/Corpus	The prostitute	Christophe Loizillon	Short
2010	Les nuits de Sister Welsh	Brenda	Jean-Claude Janer	
2011	Tous les soleils	The letter carrier	Philippe Claudel	
2011	My Worst Nightmare	Sylvie / Karen	Anne Fontaine	
2011	Famille	The teacher	Christophe Loizillon	Short
2012	Mince alors!	Nathalie	Charlotte de Turckheim	
2013	Queens of the Ring	Evelyne	Jean-Marc Rudnicki	
2013	Ogres niais	Madame Gentille	Bernard Blancan	Short
2013	Just Before Losing Everything	Sylvie	Xavier Legrand	Short
2014	Prêt à tout	Nurse	Nicolas Cuche	
2014	Number One Fan	Poker player	Jeanne Herry	
2015	Un début prometteur	The pharmacist	Emma Luchini	
2015	Qui c'est les plus forts?	Employment Center hostess	Charlotte de Turckheim	
2015	Le dernier voyage de l'énigmatique Paul WR	The cashier	Romain Quirot	Short
2016	Ares	Carla	Jean-Patrick Benes	
2016	The Jews	Rabbi's wife	Yvan Attal	
2017	Money	Camille	Géla Babluani	
2017	Orphan		Arnaud des Pallières	
2017	The Teacher	The maid	Olivier Ayache-Vidal	
2017	Les derniers Parisiens	The lawyer	Hamé & Ekoué	
2018	Amin	The director	Philippe Faucon	
2018	In Safe Hands	The pediatric nurse	Jeanne Herry	
2018	Jupiter!	Francine Bonenfant	Carlos Abascal Peiro	Short
2020	Parents d'élèves	Fabienne Baron	Noémie Saglio	
2020	Opération Finot	Félicité Bonenfant	Carlos Abascal Peiro	Short
2021	Tokyo Shaking	Béatrice	Olivier Peyon	
2021	Last Journey of Paul W.R.	Simone	Romain Quirot	
2023	Apaches	Berthe	Romain Quirot	
2023	Un petit miracle	Noémie	Sophie Boudre	

=== Television ===
Year	Title	Role	Director	Notes
2000	Les redoutables	The hitchhiker	Thierry Barthes & Pierre Jamin	TV series (1 episode)
2003	Les beaux jours	Marinette	Jean-Pierre Sinapi	TV movie
2004	À cran, deux ans après	The cop	Alain Tasma	TV movie
2004	Louis Page	Jennifer	Alain Schwartzstein	TV series (1 episode)
2005	Colomba	Margot	Laurent Jaoui	TV movie
2005-07	Sauveur Giordano	Sandra Restut	Bertrand Van Effenterre & Patrick Poubel	TV series (3 episodes)
2006	Le porte-bonheur	Midwife	Laurent Dussaux	TV movie
2006	P.J.	Befti Agent	Christophe Barbier	TV series (1 episode)
2008	Clémentine	Woman roundup	Denys Granier-Deferre	TV movie
2008	De sang et d'encre	Corinne	Charlotte Brändström	TV movie
2008	Chez Maupassant	Rosalie Vatinel	Denis Malleval	TV series (1 episode)
2008	Paris enquêtes criminelles	Judith	Dominique Tabuteau	TV series (1 episode)
2008-11	Hard	Fleur	Cathy Verney	TV series (3 episodes)
2009	Pour ma fille	Malou	Claire de la Rochefoucauld	TV movie
2010	Les Bleus	Anaïs	Alain Tasma	TV series (1 episode)
2010	Nicolas Le Floch	La Duvernois	Nicolas Picard	TV series (1 episode)
2010	Vidocq: Le Masque et la Plume	Sister Marion	Alain Choquart	TV movie
2011	Famille d'accueil	Doctor Hermel	Pascale Dallet	TV series (1 episode)
2012-14	Clem	Lily Barneron	Joyce Buñuel & Éric Le Roux	TV series (7 episodes)
2014	Fais pas ci, fais pas ça	Mika	Michel Leclerc	TV series (1 episode)
2014	Le juge est une femme	Jeanne Mercoeur	Akim Isker	TV series (1 episode)
2015-21	Cassandre	Major Sidonie Montferrat	Éric Le Roux, François Guérin, ...	TV series (18 episodes)
2017	Je voulais juste rentrer chez moi	Patricia Verstraete	Yves Rénier	TV movie
2017	Jezabel	Lucie	Julien Bittner	TV series (1 episode)
2017	Call My Agent!	The maid	Jeanne Herry	TV series (1 episode)
2018	Clash of Futures	Doriane Jamet	Frédéric Goupil & Jan Peter	TV mini-series
2018	Profilage	Jeanne Rouillet	Laure de Butler	TV series (1 episode)
2018-20	Les Bracelets Rouges	Estelle	Nicolas Cuche, Christophe Campos, ...	TV series (12 episodes)
2019	Puzzle	Lisa Moreau	Laurence Katrian	TV movie
2019	Vernon Subutex	Emilie	Cathy Verney	TV series (3 episodes)
2019	Spiral	Sabine	Frédéric Jardin & Jean-Philippe Amar	TV series (6 episodes)
2020	Le Mensonge	Fabienne	Vincent Garenq	TV mini-series
2020	Inhuman Resources	The judge	Ziad Doueiri	TV mini-series
2021-22	Les Petits Meurtres d'Agatha Christie	Annie Greco	Nicolas Picard-Dreyfuss	TV series (8 episodes)
2023	Le Code	Commandante Normand	Bénédicte Delmas	TV series (1 episode)
2023	Les indociles	Ursula	Delphine Lehericey	TV series (5 episodes)
