= Un été avec Homère =

2018 book by Sylvain Tesson

- Book cover
- Author: Sylvain Tesson
- Language: French
- Series: Un été avec
- Subject: Homer
- Publisher: France Inter and Éditions des Équateurs
- Publication date: 26 April 2018
- Publication place: France
- Pages: 256
- ISBN: 978-2-84990-550-0

Un été avec Homère (lit. 'A summer with Homer') is a 2018 book by the French writer Sylvain Tesson, originally written as a series for France Inter's radio programme Un été avec. Tesson analyses the Iliad and Odyssey by Homer, commenting on their themes, physical environment and the worldview found in them. The book was commercially successful: the French edition sold more than 200,000 copies. An expanded version with original paintings by Laurence Bost was published in 2020.

== Background ==
Un été avec, a programme on the French public radio station France Inter, began in 2012 and consists of a series of radio episodes about a famous writer each summer. The year after, the material is published as a book by France Inter and Éditions des Équateurs. Olivier Frébourg, founder of Éditions des Équateurs, knew the travel writer Sylvain Tesson and approached him with the prospect of writing a series about Jack London for the show. Tesson said he would prefer to make a series about Homer and was allowed to do so. He wrote Un été avec Homère during a month on the island of Tinos, one of the Cyclades in Greece, where he lived isolated in a pigeon house, hoping this would help him to understand Homer better.

== Summary ==
In 65 short essays, organised in 9 sections, Tesson provides personal comments to the Iliad and Odyssey, occasionally referencing writers such as Friedrich Nietzsche, Simone Weil and Hannah Arendt. Tesson goes through theories about the origins of the two epics and supports the view that they were created by a single author who compiled and adapted existing material. He analyses the geography of the stories and stresses the prominence of the Mediterranean light, the danger of the sea and how each island is its own world. He outlines the plots of the Iliad and then the Odyssey, stressing the roles of fate, hubris, walls and talent in the former, and homecoming, lineage and restoration of order in the latter. Tesson discusses Homer's conception of heroic qualities and the various aspects of the Homeric gods, including their weaknesses and how human action can be meaningful despite the absence of free will. Tesson covers the ambivalent view of war in the poems: it is varyingly viewed as terrible, unavoidable and irresistible.

Un été avec Homère goes through the various aspects of hubris, which is the fatal error of lacking moderation and something humans never cease to do. Tesson discusses Homer's style and how it creates a vertical worldview where gods can deride humans for behaving like animals. In the unceremonious portrayals of death and many references to birth and breeding, Tesson sees the core of Homeric religion: "Perhaps we should see this appetite to describe the fertile verve as a definition of paganism: being pagan is to greet all faces of life and to venerate the womb from which they proceed without worrying about their end".

== Publication ==
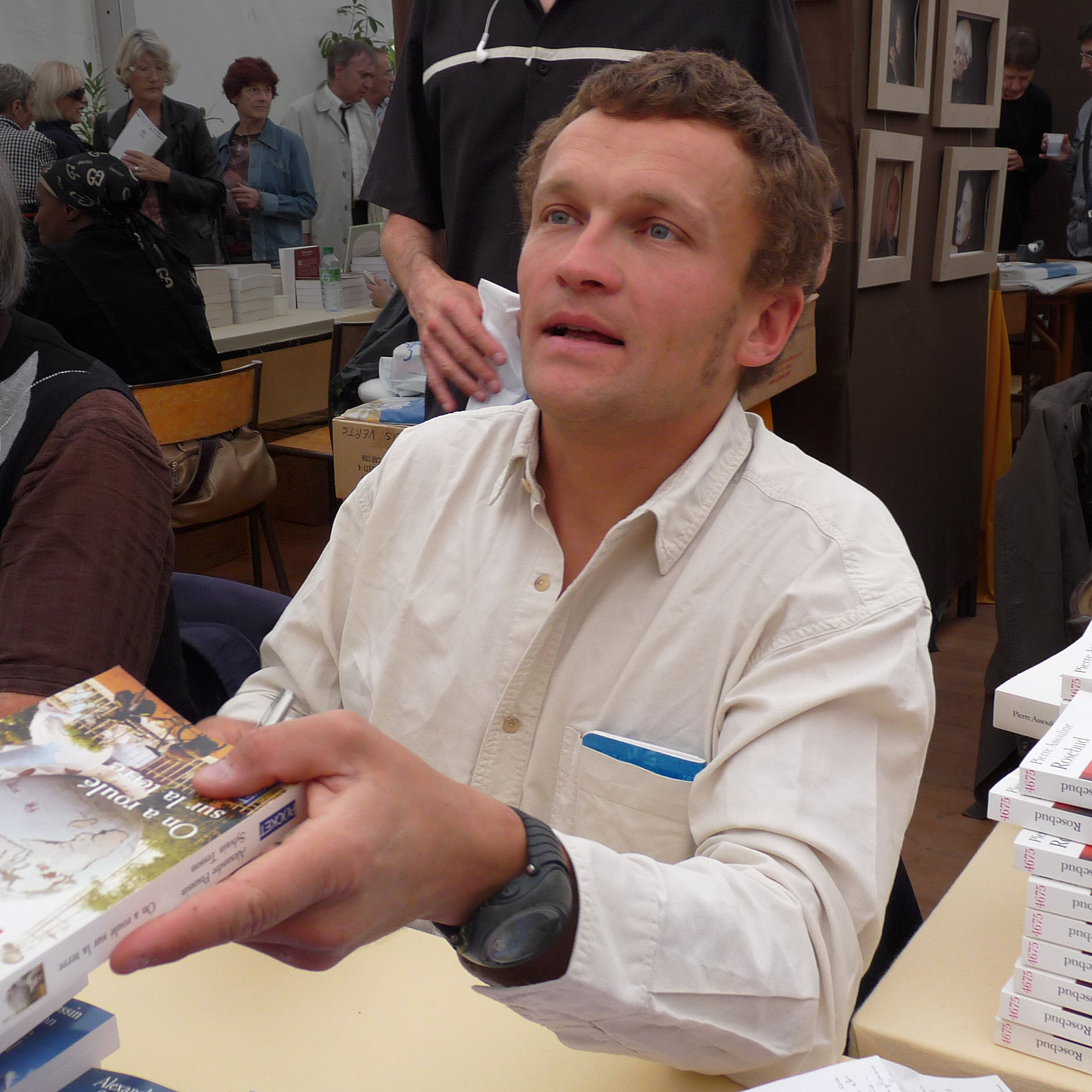
Tesson in 2011

France Inter aired the radio version of Un été avec Homère in nine weekly episodes from 1 July to 26 August 2017. The book was published by France Inter and Éditions des Équateurs on 26 April 2018. Tesson was more active in the marketing than he had been for previous books. He appeared on the television programme On n'est pas couché and the radio station France Culture. Translations of Un été avec Homère have been published in Dutch (2018), Italian (2019), Korean (2020), Polish (2019), Russian (2019), Spanish (2019) and Swedish (2019).

The French text was republished on 17 June 2020 as Un été avec Homère : voyage dans le sillage d'Ulysse (lit. 'Journey in the wake of Odysseus'). In this volume, it is supplemented with Tesson's account of a sailing trip inspired by Victor Bérard's theories about the geography of the Odyssey. The book includes original paintings by Tesson's travelling partner Laurence Bost and historical photographs by Frédéric Boissonnas who travelled in the Mediterranean Sea with Bérard in 1912.

== Reception ==
Le Parisien's Yves Jaeglé wrote that Tesson makes Homer's characters palpable. He stressed how different Un été avec Homère is from a schoolbook and said it will give "hours of happiness" to readers. Mazarine Pingeot of L'Express called the book's analyses "more Nietzschean than Hegelian". She stressed Tesson's cultural criticism, for example how he compares the world and values of Homer to those of Mark Zuckerberg and argues for the enduring relevance of the former, referring to Facebook as a digital version of "Narcissus' puddle". Zoé Petropoulou wrote in The French Review that Un été avec Homère discusses both Homer's writings and physical environment and creates analogies between the ancient epics and contemporary issues, such as armed conflicts and ecology. Petropoulou wrote that Tesson highlights the human side of the Homeric gods and how human and divine matters reflect each other. Laurent Ruquier was annoyed by Un été avec Homère which he said contains subtle reactionary views that people fail to pick up.

Un été avec Homère was a commercial success and topped France's bestseller charts for non-fiction in the spring of 2018. The first print run of 30,000 copies sold out in three days. By July 2018, the French edition had sold 70,000 copies and in August it passed 150,000 copies. As of 2021, it had sold more than 200,000 copies.

Tesson received the Grand Prix Jacques Audiberti in 2018. Although it was for his entire œuvre, the announcement statement said it was "more particularly" for Un été avec Homère.
