= The Consolations of the Forest =

2011 autobiographical book by Sylvain Tesson

- English hardcover edition
- Author: Sylvain Tesson
- Original title: Dans les forêts de Sibérie
- Translator: Linda Coverdale
- Language: French
- Publisher: Éditions Gallimard
- Publication date: 1 September 2011
- Publication place: France
- English publication date: 2013
- Pages: 266
- ISBN: 978-2070129256

The Consolations of the Forest: Alone in a Cabin on the Siberian Taiga is a 2011 book by the French writer Sylvain Tesson. Its French title is Dans les forêts de Sibérie, which means "in the forests of Siberia". It recounts how Tesson lived isolated for six months, from February to July 2010, in a cabin in Siberia, on the northwestern shore of Lake Baikal. An English translation by Linda Coverdale was published in 2013.

== Accolades ==
The book was awarded the Prix Médicis essai. It was the runner-up for the Prix Renaudot, losing to Emmanuel Carrère's Limonov. The English translation received the 2014 Dolman Best Travel Book Award.

== Adaptations ==
The book is the basis for the 2016 film In the Forests of Siberia, directed by Safy Nebbou and starring Raphaël Personnaz.

Virgile Dureuil adapted the book into the comic book Dans les forêts de Sibérie, published by Casterman in 2019.
