= Avec les fées =

2024 book by Sylvain Tesson

- Author: Sylvain Tesson
- Language: French
- Publisher: Éditions des Équateurs
- Publication date: 10 January 2024
- Publication place: France
- Pages: 224
- ISBN: 978-2-38284-371-0

Avec les fées (lit. 'With the Fairies') is a 2024 travel book by the French writer Sylvain Tesson. It covers a sailing trip along the Atlantic coast, from Spain to Scotland.

== Synopsis ==
Avec les fées is a travel book about a trip Sylvain Tesson took along the Atlantic coast for three months, visiting the Celtic nations. He was accompanied by his friends Arnaud Humann and Benoît Lettéron on a 15 metres long Breton sailboat. The trip departed from Gijón in northwestern Spain at the start of summer. It continued through Brittany in France and across the English Channel to Cornwall, Wales, Isle of Man, Ireland and finally Scotland. The crew periodically disembarked to explore the surroundings on foot or bicycle. Tesson describes the landscapes they passed through and relates them to local legends.

== Reception ==
Éditions des Équateurs published Avec les fées on 10 January 2024. Le Parisien's Grégory Plouviez wrote that Tesson's descriptions of landscapes is unmatched and that he presents a "tender and poetic" worldview. Plouviez wrote that the frequency of quotable sentences and "miraculous" aphorisms varies with different chapters, comparing the shifts in the book to high and low tides. In Paris Match, Marie-Laure Delorme wrote that the book is about the possibility "to dialogue with magnificence" as a way to escape the unsympathetic aspects of contemporary society. She wrote that one of the strongest passages is about a meeting with a disabled ex-military and highlighted the occasional presence of ironic humour. Delorme placed Tesson's storytelling "between immanence and transcendence", combining "flight and fixedness" to make the reader focus fully on worldly splendor.
