= Xavier Accart =

French historian (born 1971)

Xavier Accart (born 1971) is a historian known for his thesis on René Guénon. His field of research includes the history of spirituality, anthropology of religion and literary creation.

Having graduated from the Institut d'études politiques d'Aix-en-Provence, he earned a doctorate from the section of religious sciences at the École pratique des hautes études. His dissertation was published under the title Guénon ou le renversement des clartés : influence d'un métaphysicien sur la vie littéraire et intellectuelle française, 1920-1970 (Paris, Édidit, 2005). By the same publisher he directed, with the collaboration of Daniel Lançon and Thierry Zarcone, L'Ermite de Duqqi : René Guénon en marge des milieux francophones égyptiens (Milan, Arché, 2001). He published his first novel, Le dormant d'Ephèse, in 2019.

He is the editor-in-chief of the Prier.

== Publications ==
- With Daniel Lançon and Thierry Zarcone, L'Ermite de Duqqi. René Guénon en marge des milieux francophones égyptiens, Milan, Éditions Archè, 2001. ISBN 88-7252-227-7.
- Guénon ou le renversement des clartés. Influence d'un métaphysicien sur la vie littéraire et intellectuelle française (1920-1970), préface d'Antoine Compagnon, Edidit, 2006.
- Contribution à Jean-Pierre Brach et Jérôme Rousse-Lacordaire (dir.), Études d'histoire de l'ésotérisme, Paris, Éditions du Cerf, 2007. ISBN 978-2-204-08210-5
- Vivre et comprendre la liturgie, Presses de la Renaissance, 2009.
