= Les Écrivains de marine =

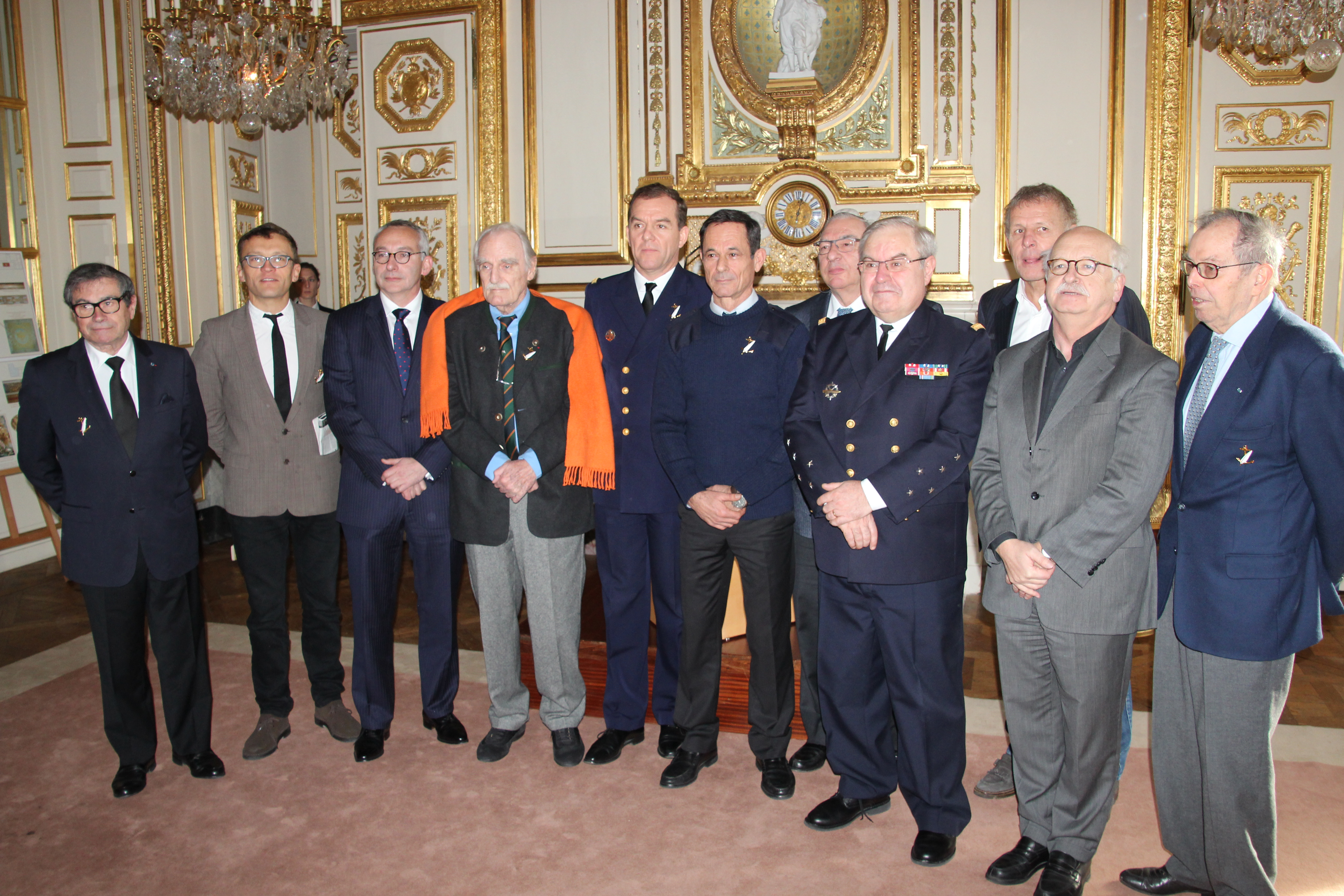
Group photo during the reception of Patrice Franceschi as Marine Writer on 10 February 2014 at the Hôtel de la Marine in Paris.

The Écrivains de Marine is a French association bringing together twenty writers with knowledge and practice of the sea. Founded in 2003 by Jean-François Deniau in close partnership with the French Navy, the writers of the Navy in an agreement signed with the Ministry of Defence which undertakes to "collectively serve the navy, promote and preserve the culture and heritage of the sea, and more generally promote the maritime dimension of France".

The members are unanimously co-opted with the approval of the Chief of Staff of the French Navy. Although they have only associative status, which differs from the status of the Navy Painters, Navy writers may embark on ships of the National Navy and are authorized to wear uniform. They are assimilated to the rank of frigate captain.

Its members include Erik Orsenna, Jean Raspail et Isabelle Autissier among others. Since 2007 its president is Didier Decoin.

== Current members ==
- Didier Decoin, of the académie Goncourt, President
- Patrick Poivre d'Arvor, vice-president
- François Bellec, Counter admiral, a member of the académie de Marine, general secretary
- Isabelle Autissier
- Hervé Hamon
- Jean Rolin
- Jean-Michel Barrault
- Loïc Finaz, Counter admiral
- Olivier Frébourg
- Titouan Lamazou
- Erik Orsenna, of the Académie française,
- Yann Queffélec
- Jean Raspail
- Jean-Christophe Rufin, of the Académie française,
- Sylvain Tesson
- Daniel Rondeau
- Patrice Franceschi
- Dominique Le Brun
- Emmelene Landon
- Anne Quemere

== Former members ==
- Jean-François Deniau of the Académie française (1928–2007), president-founder
- Bertrand Poirot-Delpech, of the Académie française (1929–2006)
- Bernard Giraudeau (1947–2010)
- Michel Mohrt, of the Académie française (1914–2011)
- Pierre Schoendoerffer, member of the Institut de France (1928–2012)
- Simon Leys (1935–2014)
- Yves La Prairie, of the Académie de Marine
- Michel Déon, of the Académie Française (1919–2016)

== See also ==
Peintre de la Marine
