= Lola Dewaere =

French actress (born 1979)

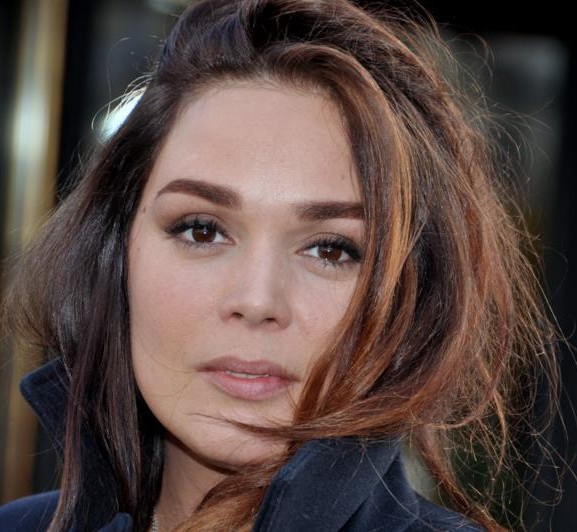
- Dewaere in 2013
- Born: 4 December 1979 (age 46); Boulogne-Billancourt, Hauts-de-Seine, France
- Occupation: Actress
- Years active: 2007–present
- Relatives: Emmanuel Karsen (cousin)

Lola Dewaere (born 4 December 1979), also known as Lola Céleste Marie Bourdeaux, is a French actress well known for her portrayal of the resourceful and empathetic police commander Raphaëlle Coste in the television series Astrid et Raphaëlle — broadcast in the United States by PBS under the title Astrid — alongside Sara Mortensen, the trilingual actress who portrays Astrid, an autistic and brilliantly innovative criminologist.

== Biography ==
Lola Dewaere is the daughter of the late actor Patrick Dewaere and Élisabeth "Elsa" Malvina Chalier. She is the half-sister of Angèle Herry-Leclerc, born in 1974 to Dewaere and the actress Miou-Miou.

After her father — heavily indebted as a consequence of his drug addiction — took his own life in his Paris house in 1982, his widow, “Elsa” Chalier, needing to work to help discharge the debts of the estate, entrusted the three-year-old Lola into the care of her maternal grandparents, residing in Saint-Lambert-du-Lattay, Maine-et-Loire. After a somewhat difficult period of elementary school, she returned to live with her mother in Paris and continued her education at a private Catholic school, Saint-Michel-de-Picpus, from which she was expelled because of her rebellious attitude and refusal to accept authority.

Around the age of 16, she says, she discovered several of her father's films, including Adieu Poulet (The French Detective, 1975), La Meilleure Façon de marcher (“The Best Way to Walk,” 1976), Coup de tête (“Hothead,” 1979), and Psy (1981), which she said she liked. In 1997, when she turned 18, she enrolled at the French drama school Cours Florent to train as an actor. After a serious car accident in 2001, she began working for the women's magazine Jalouse, later working in real estate. In 2007, she began her career as an actor.

In March 2010, Myriam Boyer secured her a role in La Vie devant soi, a television adaptation of Romain Gary's novel of the same name, published in English as The Life Before Us. In the summer of 2010, she accepted the lead role in Antoine Beauville's drama La Biscotte at Théâtre le Temple (now known as Apollo Théâtre) in Paris. The following year, actor-director Charlotte de Turckheim chose her to portray a main character in the comedy Mince Alors! (Big Is Beautiful, 2012) alongside Victoria Abril. The film was a popular success. The same year, she portrayed Marie-Lou, the cruise director in La Croisière, a six-episode series set aboard a cruise ship; the series was broadcast in both Switzerland (RTS1) and France (TF1) in 2013.

== Theatre ==
Year	Title	Author	Director
2010	La Biscotte	Antoine Beauville	Antoine Beauville
2013	La véritable histoire de Maria Callas	Jean-Yves Rogale	Françoise Petit-Balmer
2015–16	Une folie	Sacha Guitry	Francis Huster

== Filmography ==
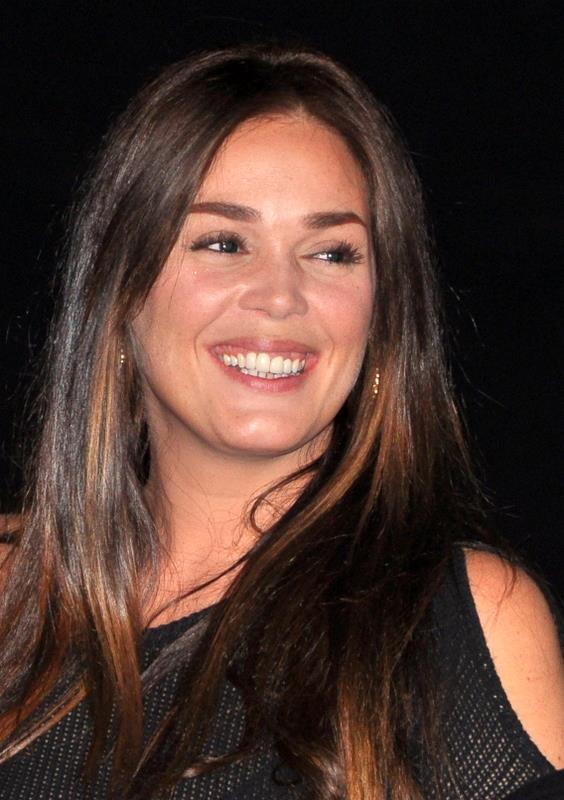
Dewaere in 2012

Year	Title	Role	Director	Notes
2007	Curriculum	The designer	Alexandre Moix	Short
2010	La vie devant soi	Nadine	Myriam Boyer	TV movie
2012	Mince alors!	Nina	Charlotte de Turckheim	Nominated - César Award for Most Promising Actress
2013	28 Jours Trop Tard	Doctor	Stephen Bigot	Short
2013	La croisière	Marie-Lou	Pascal Lahmani	TV series (6 episodes)
2014	Tu es si jolie ce soir	Barbara	Jean-Pierre Mocky	
2014	Ligne de mire	Claire	Nicolas Herdt	TV movie Luchon International Film Festival - Best Young Actress
2014–16	Mortus Corporatus	Miss Poitou	Fabien Camaly	Web Series (20 episodes)
Le Zèbre	Betty	Frédéric Berthe	TV movie	
2016	Les derniers Parisiens	Anita Lola	Hamé & Ekoué Labitey	
2016	Becoming Zoey	Karry	Dorothee Pierson	TV mini-series
2016–17	La vengeance aux yeux clairs	Pauline Jordan	David Morlet & Nicolas Guicheteau	TV series (14 episodes)
2017	911-Pizza	Woman on the phone	Elefterios Zacharopoulos	Short
2017	Le tueur du lac	Mathilde	Jérôme Cornuau	TV mini-series
2018	Crime dans le Luberon	Caroline Martinez	Éric Duret	TV movie
2019	Crime dans l'Hérault	Caroline Martinez	Éric Duret	TV movie
2019	La Dernière Vague	Marianne Lewen	Rodolphe Tissot	TV mini-series
2019	Crimes Parfaits	Lucie Perrin	Philippe Bérenger	TV series (1 episode)
2019	Astrid et Raphaëlle	Raphaëlle Coste	Hippolyte Dard & Elsa Bennet	TV series (41 episodes)
2024	‘’Mademoiselle Holmes’’	Charlie Holmes	Frédéric Berthe	PBS Masterpiece(USA), Walter Presents (6 episodes)
2026	Cat's Eyes	Barbara Altman	Alexandre Laurent	TV series
