= Un été avec =

French radio program

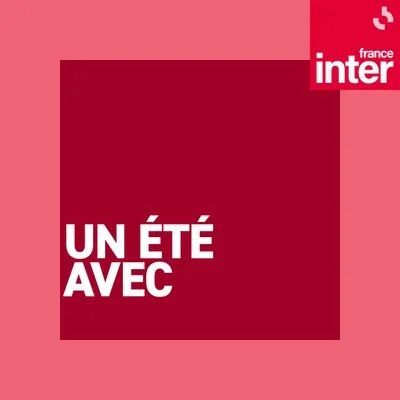
Logo for the radio programme

Un été avec (lit. 'A summer with') is a French radio programme and book series produced by France Inter since 2012. Broadcast in the summer, it consists of commentaries and reflections about a famous writer or literary work. The material is published as a book the year after the radio broadcast.

Series have been made about Michel de Montaigne (2012), Marcel Proust (2013), Charles Baudelaire (2014), Victor Hugo (2015), Niccolò Machiavelli (2016), Homer (2017), Paul Valéry (2018), Blaise Pascal (2019), Arthur Rimbaud (2020), Colette (2021), Vladimir Jankélévitch (2022) and Don Quixote (2023).

== History ==
In the summer of 2012, France Inter broadcast Un été avec Montaigne (lit. 'A summer with Montaigne'), a radio programme in 40 episodes with analyses of Michel de Montaigne's Essays. The series was written by the literature professor Antoine Compagnon of the Collège de France. It was well received and published as a book the next year by Éditions des Équateurs. France Inter made the series a yearly occurrence, applying the same formula to a famous writer every summer. Compagnon has returned several years but other writers have also written for the programme. Sylvain Tesson was initially approached to make a series about Jack London, but preferred Homer and got his wish granted in 2017. Colette was chosen as subject for the 2021 edition due to a listener complaint that the programme only had covered male writers.

A Summer with Montaigne was published in English translation in 2019.

== Series ==
Title	Subject	Written by	Original broadcast	Published
Un été avec Montaigne	Michel de Montaigne	Antoine Compagnon	2 July – 24 August 2012	16 May 2013
Un été avec Proust	Marcel Proust	Laura El Makki, Antoine Compagnon, Raphaël Enthoven, Michel Erman, Adrien Goetz, Nicolas Grimaldi, Julia Kristeva, Jérôme Prieur and Jean-Yves Tadié	1 July – 22 August 2013	5 July 2014
Un été avec Baudelaire	Charles Baudelaire	Antoine Compagnon	15 July – 22 August 2014	21 May 2015
Un été avec Victor Hugo	Victor Hugo	Laura El Makki and Guillaume Gallienne	29 June – 21 August 2015	4 May 2016
Un été avec Machiavel	Niccolò Machiavelli	Patrick Boucheron	11 July – 19 August 2016	11 May 2017
Un été avec Homère	Homer	Sylvain Tesson	1 July – 26 August 2017	26 April 2018
Un été avec Paul Valéry	Paul Valéry	Régis Debray	17 July – 24 August 2018	23 May 2019
Un été avec Pascal	Blaise Pascal	Antoine Compagnon	8 July – 23 August 2019	2 June 2020
Un été avec Rimbaud	Arthur Rimbaud	Sylvain Tesson	29 June – 21 August 2020	5 May 2021
Un été avec Colette	Colette	Antoine Compagnon	5 July – 27 August 2021	18 May 2022
Un été avec Jankélévitch	Vladimir Jankélévitch	Cynthia Fleury	4 July – 28 August 2022	31 May 2023
Un été avec don Quichotte	Don Quixote	William Marx	3 July – 25 August 2023	1 May 2024
Un été avec Romain Gary	Romain Gary	Maria Pourchet	1 July – 23 August 2024	TBA

== Reception ==
Le Figaro's Thierry Clermont described the first book, A Summer with Montaigne, as a success and attributed this to the simplicity and pertinence conveyed by Compagnon's presentation of Montaigne's themes. Marion Mayer of Télérama called the programmes about Colette fascinating and wrote that they manage to include much without becoming indigestible.

The books have been commercially successful. A Summer with Montaigne sold 250,000 copies. Tesson's Un été avec Homère sold 200,000 copies.
