= Murabilia (Lucca) =

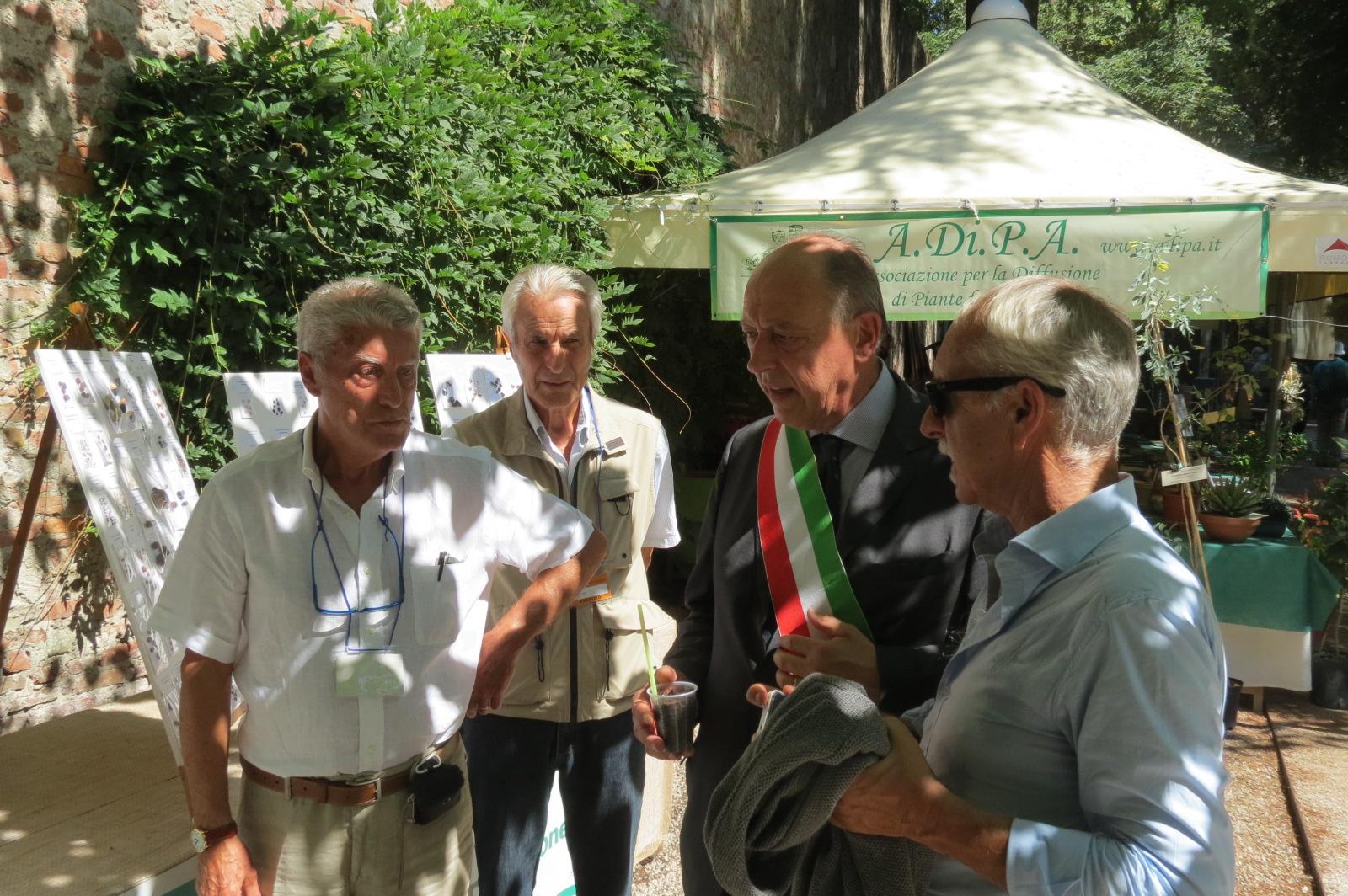
- Status: Active
- Genre: Gardening show, horticultural fair
- Frequency: Annually
- Location: Lucca
- Country: Italy
- Years active: 2001-present
- Attendance: 20,000
- Organiser: Lucca Crea Srl

Murabilia is one of Italy’s leading gardening exhibitions, dedicated to high-quality horticulture, including flowers, plants, and cultivation techniques. The event takes place annually in the historic city of Lucca, Tuscany, along a portion of its preserved Renaissance walls—specifically at the Baluardo San Regolo and Baluardo della Libertà—as well as within the city's Botanical Garden (Orto Botanico di Lucca).

== History ==
Murabilia was established in 2001 and was originally conceived as a small market focused on plants and gardening products. It is held in early September, coinciding with the beginning of the Settembre Lucchese, a traditional month of cultural, religious and social events in Lucca. The timing aligns with the natural resumption of gardening activities following the summer season and before the onset of autumn.

The event is rooted in Lucca’s longstanding traditions of amateur gardening, which have characterised the region forcenturies. Over the years, Murabilia has grown into a broad horticultural fair, integrating botanical art exhibitions, antique gardening prints, and encounters with experts—through both scheduled lectures and informal discussions at exhibitor stands. It has evolved from a local initiative into a nationally recognised event, bringing together horticulture, historical awareness, and cultural heritage.

== Programme and activities ==
Each edition of Murabilia is themed. For instance, the 2024 edition was titled Uno sguardo verso il cielo ("A look towards the sky") and focused on trees and tall-growing plants.

The event typically includes:

- Themed botanical exhibitions
- Talks and lectures by international experts
- Book presentations on gardening and botany
- Practical workshops open to all audiences
- Educational activities for children as part of the Young Gardening initiative

These activities are curated to attract both professionals in the field and amateur gardening enthusiasts.

== Exhibitors and guests ==
Murabilia features over 250 exhibitors, specialising in rare botanical species, heritage cultivars, and newly introduced plants. The fair also hosts stalls offering gardening tools, artisan crafts, and high-quality food products.

The event has welcomed notable international guests, including:

- Bleddyn and Sue Wynn-Jones, collectors and owners of Crûg Farm Plants (Wales)
- Olivier Colin, French botanist and landscape designer
- Francesca Marzotto Caotorta, founder of the monthly gardening magazine Gardenia

== Awards and honours ==
Murabilia grants several awards each year to recognise excellence in horticulture, gardening practice, and botanical research.

In 2023, the prestigious Verdemente Award was presented to Francesca Marzotto Caotorta for her contributions to the promotion of gardening culture and environmental awareness through publishing. In the same edition, a posthumous honour was awarded to a member of A.Di.P.A. (Associazione per la Diffusione di Piante fra Amatori), a botanical society based in Lucca, in recognition of outstanding contributions to amateur plant propagation.

Additional prizes are awarded to exhibitors for the most outstanding displays and for innovative botanical specimens presented at the event.

== Location ==
Murabilia is set along Lucca’s Renaissance city walls, which are among the best-preserved examples of sixteenth-century military architecture in Europe. Today, they function as an elevated public park encircling the historic centre.

The fair takes place along the southern stretch of the walls, from the Baluardo San Regolo to the Baluardo della Libertà, and extends into the adjacent Botanical Garden of Lucca, enhancing the botanical and educational experience for visitors.

== Organisation ==
Murabilia is organised by Lucca Crea Srl, the same entity responsible for Lucca Comics & Games, with the support of the Comune di Lucca and other local institutions.
