= Catherine Hosmalin =

French actress

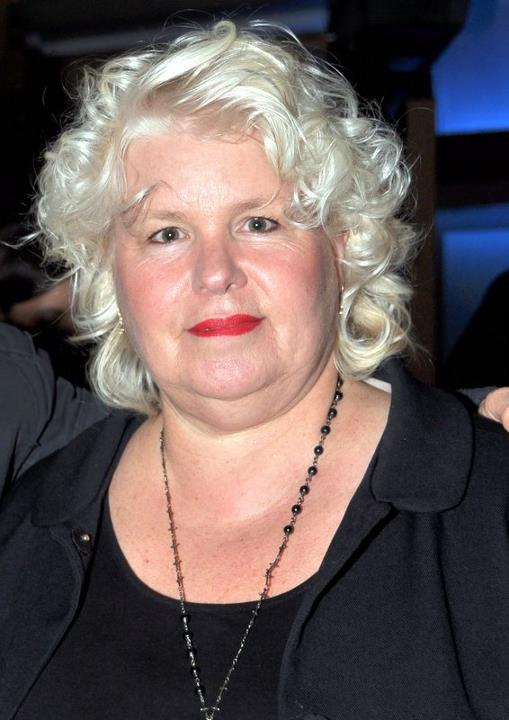
- Catherine Hosmalin in 2012
- Born: 1 June 1960 (age 65); France
- Occupation: Actress
- Years active: 1983–present

Catherine Hosmalin is a French actress.

== Personal life ==
While promoting the movie "Mince Alors", Hosmalin told to Laurent Ruquier in On n'est pas couché : "It's not easy to be big. I would like to lose weight but at the same time it's me, I'm like that. This is my body, I respect him. It [weight] is part of me".

== Theater ==
Year	Title	Author	Director
1983	Little Tales of Misogyny	Patricia Highsmith	Eva Barbuscia
1990-91	The Women's Decameron	Julia Voznesenskaya	Danielle Chinsky
1992	La nuit au cirque	Olivier Py	François Rancillac
1994	The Provoked Wife	John Vanbrugh	Danielle Chinsky
2002-04	Knock	Jules Romains	Maurice Bénichou
2010	Bed and Breakfast	Joe O'Byrne	Cerise Guy
2013	The Madwoman of Chaillot	Jean Giraudoux	Didier Long
2014	La perle rare	Julie Duchatel	Julie Duchatel
2015	The Elephant Song	Nicolas Billon	Bruno Dupuis
2016-17	Pour en finir avec Hugh Grant	Emmanuelle Michelet	Emmanuelle Michelet
2018	Manhattan Murder Mystery	Woody Allen	Elsa Royer
2019-21	Père ou fils	Clément Michel	David Roussel & Arthur Jugnot

== Filmography ==
Year	Title	Role	Director	Notes
1986	La goula	La goula	Roger Guillot	Short; Clermont-Ferrand Short Film Festival - Best Actress
1988	Prisonnières	Janine	Charlotte Silvera	
1988	Un jour à Rome		Roger Guillot	TV series (1 episode)
1989	La clé n'est pas dans le pot de géranium		Manuela Gourary	Short
1989	Palace	The fairy	Jean-Michel Ribes	TV series (1 episode)
1990	Je t'ai dans la peau	Agnès	Jean-Pierre Thorn	
1990	Un destin cannibale	Amandine	Roger Guillot	TV movie
1990	Les bottes de sept lieues	Madame Huchemin	Hervé Baslé	TV movie
1991	Un type bien	Paula	Laurent Bénégui	
1993	Maigret	The prostitute	Andrzej Kostenko	TV series (1 episode)
1994	Un été à l'envers		Roger Guillot	TV movie
1998	L'échappée	Gigi	Roger Guillot	TV movie
1999	Superlove	Willy's mother	Jean-Claude Janer	
1999	Venus Beauty Institute	A client	Tonie Marshall	
1999	Mon père, ma mère, mes frères et mes soeurs	Mireille Grognard	Charlotte de Turckheim	
1999	Les petits souliers	Madame Tagin	Éric Toledano and Olivier Nakache	Short
1999	La vie comme un dimanche	Madame Barnier	Roger Guillot	TV movie
2000	En vacances	Marianne Delperée	Yves Hanchar	
2000	Total western	Gisèle	Éric Rochant	
2000	Les filles du douze	Béa	Pascale Breton	Short
2000	Avocats & associés	Sophie Carlino	Denis Amar	TV series (1 episode)
2000	Un flic nommé Lecoeur	Arielle Bousquet	Alain Tasma	TV series (1 episode)
2001	15 August	Neighbor	Patrick Alessandrin	
2001	A Hell of a Day	Cockroaches's woman	Marion Vernoux	
2001	Les petites mains	Lulu	Lou Jeunet	TV movie
2002	Ces jours heureux	Madame Audibert	Éric Toledano and Olivier Nakache	Short
2002	Angelina	The baker	Claude d'Anna	TV movie
2003	I, Cesar	The baker	Richard Berry	
2003	Chouchou	Madame Armand	Merzak Allouache	
2003	Mauvais esprit	The store's client	Patrick Alessandrin	
2003	The Cost of Living	Karine	Philippe Le Guay	
2003	La patience d'une mère	Edmée Kerodran	Dodine Herry	
2003	Blague à part	The doctor	François Greze	TV series (1 episode)
2004	Illumination	Marie-No	Pascale Breton	
2004	La confiance règne	Greta	Étienne Chatiliez	
2004	La nourrice	Léontine	Renaud Bertrand	TV movie
2005	Palais royal!	Open day's lady	Valérie Lemercier	
2005	Let's Be Friends	Woman speed dating	Éric Toledano and Olivier Nakache	
2005	Le petit chevalier	Hospital's woman	Sami Lorentz	Short
2005	Spiral	The psychologist	Philippe Triboit	TV series (1 episode)
2005	Vénus & Apollon		Olivier Guignard	TV series (1 episode)
2006	Dikkenek	Mich's wife	Olivier Van Hoofstadt	
2006	Les aristos	Hostess	Charlotte de Turckheim	
2006	Les irréductibles	Micheline	Renaud Bertrand	
2006	Those Happy Days	Christine	Éric Toledano and Olivier Nakache	
2006	La reine Sylvie	Corinne	Renaud Bertrand	TV movie
2006	La volière aux enfants	Madame Carpantier	Olivier Guignard	TV movie
2007	Mr. Bean's Holiday	Ticket Inspector	Steve Bendelack	
2007	Ma place au soleil	Chocolate's woman	Eric de Montalier	
2007	Deux vies... plus une	Monique	Idit Cebula	
2007	Chez Maupassant	Madame Leblond	Jacques Santamaria	TV series (1 episode)
2008	I've Loved You So Long	Insertion Advisor	Philippe Claudel	
2008	Leur morale... et la nôtre	Madame Fandango	Florence Quentin	
2008	Louise Hires a Contract Killer	Madame Pinchon	Gustave de Kervern & Benoît Delépine	
2008	Sa raison d'être	Head of Service	Renaud Bertrand	TV movie
2009	Victor	Madame Barbosa	Thomas Gilou	
2009	Tellement proches	Nicole	Éric Toledano and Olivier Nakache	
2009	Le juge est une femme	Sister Jeanne	Denis Amar	TV series (1 episode)
2010	Mammuth	Catherine's friend	Gustave de Kervern & Benoît Delépine	
2010	The Round Up	The baker	Roselyne Bosch	
2010-13	Maison Close	Marguerite Fourchon	Mabrouk El Mechri	TV series (16 episodes)
2011	Case départ	Madame Jourdain	Lionel Steketee, Fabrice Eboué & Thomas N'Gijol	
2011	Holidays by the Sea	House's woman	Pascal Rabaté	
2012	Big Is Beautiful	Emilie	Charlotte de Turckheim	
2012	Parlez-moi de vous	Ingrid Goulain	Pierre Pinaud	
2012	Comme un air d'autoroute	Francette	Vincent Burgevin & Franck Lebon	TV movie
2013	Adieu Paris	Madame Colussant	Franziska Buch	
2013	La vraie vie des profs	Madame De Grémont	Emmanuel Klotz & Albert Pereira-Lazaro	
2014	La trouvaille de Juliette	Aurélie	Jérôme Navarro	TV movie
2015	Chic!	Caroline Langer	Jérôme Cornuau	
2015	Le talent de mes amis	Internship's woman	Alex Lutz	
2015	Qui c'est les plus forts?	Solange	Charlotte de Turckheim	
2015	Merci pour tout, Charles	The counselor	Ernesto Oña	TV movie
2015	Mongeville	Martine Demau	Bruno Garcia	TV series (1 episode)
2016	Fleur de Tonnerre	The godmother	Stéphanie Pillonca	
2016	La folle histoire de Max et Léon	Madame Dormeuil	Jonathan Barré	
2017	La deuxième étoile	Sister Suzy	Lucien Jean-Baptiste	
2017	Arborg	Ida	Antoine Delelis	Short
2017	Un Regard dans la Nuit	The psychiatrist	Christophe Gand	Short
2017	Murders in The Landes	Suzanne Beaumont	Jean-Marc Thérin	TV movie
2017	Scènes de ménages	Maryline	Francis Duquet	TV series (1 episode)
2017	Lebowitz contre Lebowitz	Anouk's mother	Christophe Barraud	TV series (1 episode)
2018	Guy	The friend	Alex Lutz	
2018	L'école est finie	Simone	Anne Depétrini	
2018	Artem silendi	Mother Superior	Frank Ychou	Short
2018	Nox	Nadine Rogier	Mabrouk El Mechri	TV series (1 episode)
2018-20	Groom	The referee	Théodore Bonnet	TV series (3 episodes)
2019	Smile	Mother	Léa Lando & Stéphane Marelli	Short
2019	Tropiques criminels	Sabine	Stéphane Kappes	TV series (1 episode)
2019	Les topos de lolo	The mother	Nadja Anane	TV series (1 episode)
2019	Zérostérone	Governor Kim	Nadja Anane	TV series (5 episodes)
2020	Papa Rapido	Suzie	Enya Baroux	Short
2020	Belle belle belle	Nanou	Anne Depétrini	TV movie
2020	Peur sur le lac	Cécile's mother	Jérôme Cornuau	TV mini-series
2021	Bigger Is Beautiful	Emilie	Charlotte de Turckheim	
2021	Dans les parages	The festival lady	Paul Lefevre	Short
2022	Menteur	Geneviève	Olivier Baroux	
2022	Je te promets	Jacqueline	Renaud Bertrand	TV series (2 episodes)
2023	Un stupéfiant Noël		Arthur Sanigou	
TBA	Serial Hunter		Renaud Bertrand	TV mini-series Post-Production
TBA	Brocéliande		Bruno Garcia	TV series Post-Production
