= Dominique Tricaud =

Dominique Tricaud (born 1955 in Paris, France) is a lawyer whose fame in the United States derives from his being the defense attorney in Paris, France of Ira Einhorn, the famous environmentalist, convicted in absentia of murder. Tricaud claimed he had never lost an extradition case and that "the French will not send a man back to a barbaric country where he was tried without being present to defend himself". Tricaud eventually lost the case and Einhorn was convicted of the murder of his girlfriend, Holly Maddux, in the United States. The Einhorn case was the basis for the TV film The Hunt for the Unicorn Killer in 1999. Einhorn was convicted in the United States in 2001. He was also the advocate for Jean Germain, mayor of Tours, who died before standing trial.

More recently, Tricaud was again the defense attorney in a high-profile legal case in France as the lawyer for rapper Hamé of French rap group La Rumeur, who was accused of libeling the police. He also represented French politician Julien Dray, who was accused of corruption.
