= Virgile Dureuil =

French comics creator (born 1987)

- Born: 28 May 1987 (age 39)
- Areas: Writer, Artist

Virgile Dureuil (born 28 May 1987) is a French comics creator. He is known for having adapted three autobiographical adventure books by Sylvain Tesson into comics: The Consolations of the Forest in 2019, Berezina in 2021 and L'Axe du loup in 2023. In 2022, Dureuil published Un Jour dans la nuit, a documentary comic book about the renovation of a railway line during the COVID-19 lockdown.

== Selected bibliography ==
- Dans les forêts de Sibérie, Casterman, 2019, ISBN 9782203198821
- Berezina, Casterman, 2021, ISBN 9782203223523
- Un Jour dans la nuit, Autrement, 2022, ISBN 9782746762756
- L'Axe du loup, Casterman, 2023, ISBN 9782203250956
