= In the Forests of Siberia =

- Theatrical release poster
- French: Dans les forêts de Sibérie
- Directed by: Safy Nebbou
- Screenplay by: Safy Nebbou; David Oelhoffen
- Based on: The Consolations of the Forest by Sylvain Tesson
- Produced by: Philip Boëffard; Christophe Rossignon
- Starring: Raphaël Personnaz
- Cinematography: Gilles Porte
- Edited by: Anna Riche
- Music by: Ibrahim Maalouf
- Production companies: Nord-Ouest Films; France 3 Cinéma; Zéphyr Productions
- Distributed by: Paname Distribution
- Release dates: 8 June 2016 (Cabourg); 15 June 2016 (France)
- Running time: 105 minutes
- Country: France
- Languages: French; Russian
- Budget: $4 million
- Box office: $1.9 million

In the Forests of Siberia (original title: Dans les forêts de Sibérie) is a 2016 French film directed by Safy Nebbou and adapted by Nebbou and David Oelhoffen from Sylvain Tesson's 2011 book The Consolations of the Forest. It stars Raphaël Personnaz.

== Plot ==
To satisfy a need for freedom, the French media-director Teddy decides to leave the noise of the world, and settles alone in a cabin on the frozen shores of Lake Baikal. One night, lost in the blizzard, he is rescued by Aleksei, a Russian murderer on the run, who has been hiding in the Siberian forest for several years. Between these two men, who are opposed to each other, friendship will be born as sudden as essential.

== Cast ==
- Raphaël Personnaz as Teddy
- Yevgeny Sidikhin as Aleksei
