= Les antimodernes =

2005 book by Antoine Compagnon

- Author: Antoine Compagnon
- Language: French
- Publisher: Éditions Gallimard
- Publication date: 2005
- Publication place: France
- Pages: 464
- ISBN: 9782070772230

Les antimodernes : de Joseph de Maistre à Roland Barthes (lit. 'The Antimoderns: from Joseph de Maistre to Roland Barthes') is a 2005 book by the French literary scholar Antoine Compagnon. It surveys criticism of modernity in French literature since the time of the French Revolution. Among the writers covered are Joseph de Maistre, Charles Baudelaire, Charles Péguy, Julien Gracq and Roland Barthes.

Compagnon had been a student of Barthes in the 1970s and attributes both his teacher and himself with a kind of antimodern thought he defines as "being a lucid modern". The book received the 2006 Prix de la critique from the Académie Française.

== See also ==
- The Five Paradoxes of Modernity, another book by Compagnon
