= Julia Piaton =

French actress (born 1985)

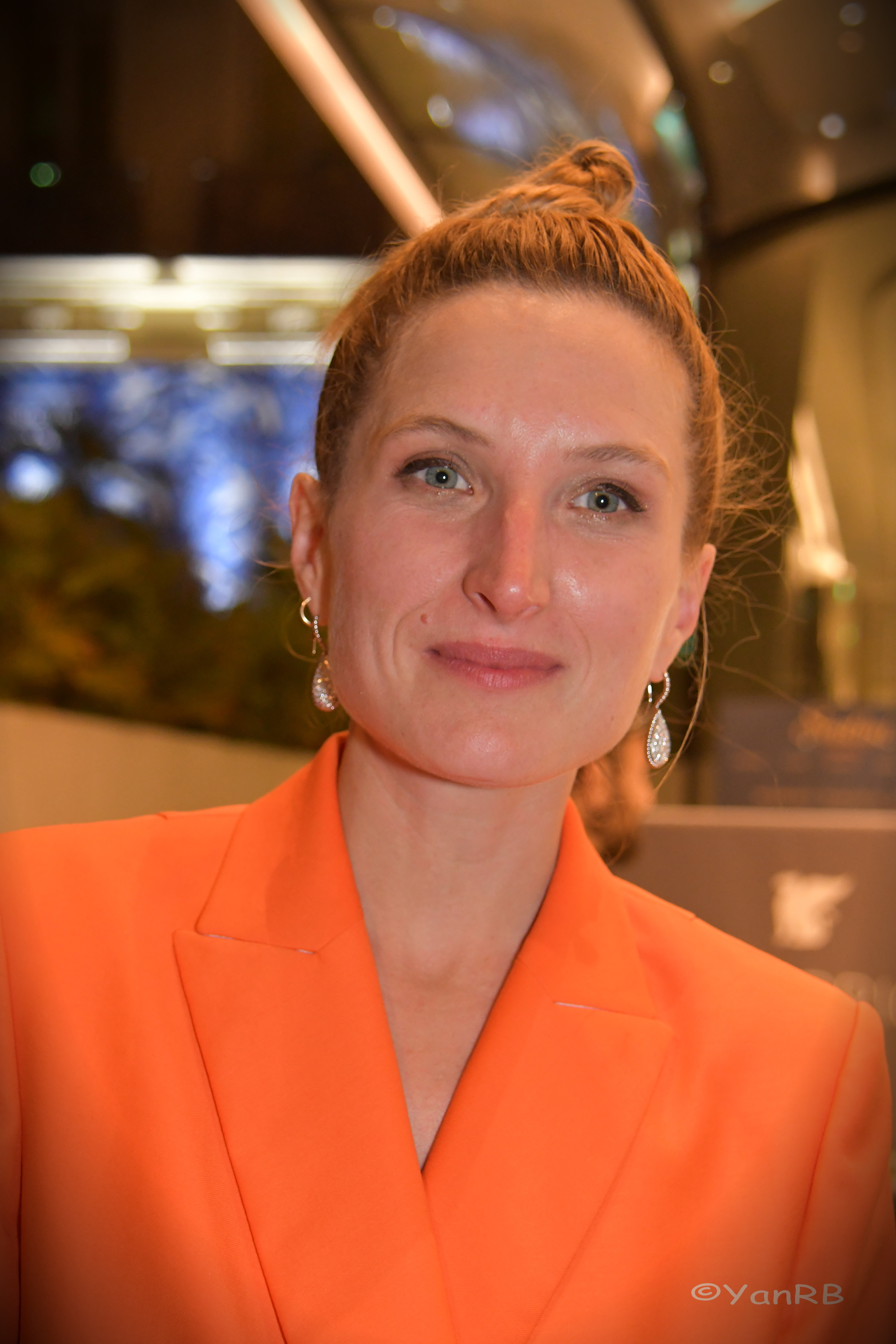
- Julia Piaton in 2022.
- Born: 29 January 1985 (age 41); Paris, France
- Occupation: Actress
- Years active: 2006-present
- Parents: Jean-Marc Piaton; Charlotte de Turckheim

Julia Piaton (French: [ʒylja pjatɔ̃]; born 29 January 1985) is a French actress. She is best known for playing the role of Odile in Serial (Bad) Weddings and Aure Hazan in Family Business.

== Career ==
In 2014, she played the role of Odile Verneuil in the hit comedy Serial (Bad) Weddings. She reprised her role in the first sequel, Serial (Bad) Weddings 2, released in 2019, but not in the second one, Serial (Bad) Weddings 3, released in 2022.

In 2017, she played the lead role in the TV mini-series The Frozen Dead.

In 2021, she received a nomination for the César Award for Most Promising Actress for her role in Love Affair(s) directed by Emmanuel Mouret.

== Life ==
Julia Piaton is the daughter of French actress Charlotte de Turckheim and Jean-Marc Piaton. She has two sisters named Clara and Johanna.

She is the mother of a son, born in August 2017. Her second child was born in April 2023.

== Theater ==
| Year | Title | Author | Director |
|---|---|---|---|
| 2013 | Paroles d’acteurs | Ödön von Horváth | André Wilms |

== Filmography ==
| Year | Title | Role | Director | Notes |
|---|---|---|---|---|
| 2006 | Les aristos | Pauline | Charlotte de Turckheim | |
| 2008 | Nos 18 ans | Sarah | Frédéric Berthe | |
| 2009 | Diane, femme flic | Amandine | Manuel Boursinhac | TV series (1 episode) |
| 2010 | Astromaniak | | Pierre-Yves Touzot | Short |
| 2011 | Charlie | Girl | Philippe Thimel | Short |
| 2012 | Big Is Beautiful | Roxanne | Charlotte de Turckheim | |
| 2013 | The Scapegoat | The journalist | Nicolas Bary | |
| 2013 | Not to Be | Young girl | Clément Sibony | Short |
| 2013-15 | Profilage | Jessica Kancel | Simon Astier, Alexandre Laurent, ... | TV series (6 episodes) |
| 2014 | Tiens-toi droite | Advertising girl | Katia Lewkowicz | |
| 2014 | Serial (Bad) Weddings | Odile Verneuil | Philippe de Chauveron | |
| 2014 | Les pères Noël | Michèle | Emmanuelle Michelet | Short |
| 2015 | Le talent de mes amis | Helen | Alex Lutz | |
| 2015 | Qui c'est les plus forts? | Pépin | Charlotte de Turckheim | |
| 2015 | Le secret d'Elise | Ariane Letilleul | Alexandre Laurent | TV mini-series |
| 2016 | Stop Me Here | The judge | Gilles Bannier | |
| 2016 | House of Time | Lynn Fooley | Jonathan Helpert | |
| 2016 | Roommates Wanted | Marion Legloux | François Desagnat | |
| 2016 | One Man and His Cow | The reporter | Mohamed Hamidi | |
| 2016 | Among the mermaids | Juliette | Marie Jardillier | Short |
| 2016 | Après moi le bonheur | Laurence | Nicolas Cuche | TV movie |
| 2017 | Jour J | Alexia | Reem Kherici | |
| 2017 | Pochette surprise | Karine | François Uzan | Short |
| 2017 | The Frozen Dead | Irène Ziegler | Laurent Herbiet | TV mini-series |
| 2018 | To Each, Her Own | Claire | Myriam Aziza | |
| 2018 | La monnaie de leur pièce | Eloïse | Anne Le Ny | |
| 2019 | Serial (Bad) Weddings 2 | Odile Verneuil | Philippe de Chauveron | |
| 2019 | Le Grand Bazar | Marie | Baya Kasmi | TV series (6 episodes) |
| 2019-21 | Family Business | Aure Hazan | Igor Gotesman | TV series (18 episodes) |
| 2020 | Selfie | Amandine | Cyril Gelblat | |
| 2020 | Love Affair(s) | Victoire | Emmanuel Mouret | Nominated - César Award for Most Promising Actress |
| 2021 | C'est la vie | Sandrine | Julien Rambaldi | |
| 2021 | The Speech | Sophie | Laurent Tirard | |
| 2022 | Les engagés | Gabrielle Allard | Emilie Frèche | |
| 2023 | Garder ton nom | | Vincent Duquesne | |
| 2023 | Les petites victoires | Alice Le Guennic | Mélanie Auffret | |
| 2023 | Like a Prince | Eddy | Ali Marhyar | |
| 2024 | Citadel: Diana | Cécile Martin | Arnaldo Catinari | TV Series (6 episodes) |
| 2025 | Le Secret de Khéops | Isis Robinson | Barbara Schulz | |
| 2025 | Colours of Time | Céline | Cédric Klapisch | |
| 2025 | Les Règles de l'art | | Dominique Baumard | |
