= Prix Jean Gabin =

The Prix Jean Gabin was a French award presented each year between 1981 and 2006 to a young and upcoming actor working in the French film industry.

The award was created on the initiative of Louis de Funès (1914–1983) in 1981, as a tribute to the late Jean Gabin (1904–1976). It was renamed the Prix Patrick Dewaere in 2008, following a dispute between the organisers and the daughter of Jean Gabin.

The counterpart of Prix Jean Gabin, the Prix Romy Schneider, is awarded to an actress each year in Paris since 1984.

== Recipients ==
Year	Recipient(s)
1981	Thierry Lhermitte
1982	Gérard Lanvin
1983	Gérard Darmon
1984	François Cluzet
1985	Christophe Malavoy
1986	Tchéky Karyo
1987	Jean-Hugues Anglade
1988	Thierry Frémont
1989	Vincent Lindon
1990	Lambert Wilson
1991	Fabrice Luchini
1992	Vincent Pérez
1993	Olivier Martinez
1994	Manuel Blanc
1995	Mathieu Kassovitz
1996	Guillaume Depardieu
1997	Yvan Attal
1998	Vincent Elbaz
1999	Samuel Le Bihan
2000	Guillaume Canet
2001	José Garcia
2002	Benoît Poelvoorde
2003	Johnny Hallyday
2004	Lorànt Deutsch
2005	Clovis Cornillac
2006	Jérémie Renier
