= La Rumeur =

French rap group

- Origin: France
- Genres: Political rap
- Members: Ékoué (rapper); Hamé (rapper); Mourad (rapper); Philippe (rapper); Kool M (DJ); Soul G (DJ)

La Rumeur (French pronunciation: [la ʁyˈmœʁ]) is a French rap band from Élancourt, Yvelines. Founded in 1995, the group is composed of four rappers, Ékoué, Hamé, Mourad, and Philippe, and two DJs, Kool M and Soul G.

Considering themselves an "underground" or subversive group, La Rumeur has refused to adapt their lyrics for radio. They carefully select the media outlets with which they communicate, shunning the popular press, television, and radio. Concerts and word of mouth are their main means of promotion.

La Rumeur and the group Anfalsh are very close, having written and performed several songs together. They have also worked with politically involved hip hop crews such as Assassin, Kalash, Less' du Neuf, and hardcore rappers Sheryo and Casey (rapper). Lastly, they have also worked with American political hip hop duo dead prez.

== Political involvement ==
La Rumeur has involved itself in political activism in the suburbs of France, calling for attention to be paid to the often-ignored 1961 Paris massacre, as well as to police abuse, including "accidental" killings of young French people. The band is critical of reformist NGOs such as SOS Racisme, and initially expressed political views through the magazines that came with their records, which are now in the form of webzines. Hamé wrote: "... through organizations such as SOS Racisme, created by the Socialist Party to contribute to the destruction of the Marche des beurs radicalism; 'Equal rights' has become 'Equal chances to be admitted into nightclubs'. Justice for those assassinated by the police is overshadowed by massive slogans such as "Hands off my pal !" and "Long live miscegenation !", etc.... La Rumeur is closer to NGOs such as the MIB (Mouvement Immigration Banlieue).

In May 2008, La Rumeur performed in Minneapolis as guests of Ursus Minor at the Triple Rock Social Club during the Minnesota sur Seine festival.

In 2002, the band was sued by Nicolas Sarkozy, who was at the time the French Minister of the Interior and subsequently became the President of the French Republic (2007–2012). He accused La Rumeur member Hamé of defaming the French police, referring to an article written by Hamé about instances of discrimination and police brutality against minorities. Despite two court orders in their favor, the band was targeted relentlessly for years, with the first court decisions being appealed by the Ministry of the Interior after former Interior Minister Sarkozy had become president. After a succession of 5 trials and a total of 8 years of legal processes (in which they were represented by Dominique Tricaud), they eventually won the legal battle in 2010 and were acquitted of the libel charge brought by then-President Sarkozy.

== Members ==
- Ékoué (formerly Le Poison d'Avril)
- Hamé (formerly Le Franc-Tireur)
- Mourad (formerly Le Paria)
- Philippe (formerly Le Bavar)
- Kool M
- Soul G

== Discography ==
=== Albums ===
- 2002: L'Ombre sur la Mesure
- 2004: Regain de Tension
- 2007: Du Cœur à l'Outrage
- 2007: 1997-2007 Les Inédits
- 2012: Tout brûle déjà
- 2013: Les inédits 2
- 2017: Les inédits, vol. 3

=== Maxis ===
- 1997: Volet 1 : Le Poison d'Avril
- 1998: Volet 2 : Le Franc-Tireur
- 1999: L'Entre Volets
- 1999: Volet 3 : Le Bavar & Le Paria
- 2002: Je Connais tes Cauchemars / Le Prédateur Isolé
- 2003: Nous Sommes les Premiers...
- 2004: Pourquoi On Resterait Calme ? (P.O.R.C.)

== External links (in French) ==
- Lyrics
- Trial
