= Les Aristos =

- Film poster
- Directed by: Charlotte de Turckheim
- Written by: Charlotte de Turckheim; Jean-Marie Duprez
- Produced by: Stéphane Marsil
- Starring: Charlotte de Turckheim; Jacques Weber; Catherine Jacob; Urbain Cancelier; Armelle
- Cinematography: Pascal Ridao
- Edited by: Anne Lafarge
- Music by: Marc Marder
- Production company: Hugo Films
- Distributed by: TFM Distribution
- Release date: 20 September 2006
- Running time: 79 minutes
- Country: France
- Language: French
- Budget: $8.2 million
- Box office: $6.3 million

Les Aristos is a 2006 French comedy film directed by Charlotte de Turckheim.

== Plot ==
The Arbac Family Neuville is a family of penniless aristocrats, that to survive and continue living their castle into disrepair, need to conduct some tricks like selling fake antiques to tourists. One day arises a bailiff commissioned by the Treasury for the recovery of a sum of nearly two million euro in respect of tax. In the event of default, all the family property will be seized. Follows a race against time to find the money. Everything is tried: a visit to the distant cousins still rich, a job search at the employment center in the Pauline boards, letter carrier and family friend, nothing works. Finally, Charles-Antoine, the eldest, who will have to go to a rally to go fishing to young unmarried aristocrat, namely Marie-Astrid Saumur-Chantilly Fortemure, wealthy heiress but particularly repulsive and stupid. Marriage is about to be organized, but Anthony Charles becomes infatuated with Pauline, opposing the interests of the family, the reasons of which reason knows nothing heart ...

== Cast ==
- Charlotte de Turckheim as Countess Solange
- Jacques Weber as Count Charles Valéran
- Catherine Jacob as Duchess Marie-Claude Saumur Chantilly
- Urbain Cancelier as Duke Reginald Saumur Chantilly
- Armelle as Marie-Karoline
- Julia Piaton as Pauline
- Johanna Piaton as Marie-Charlotte
- Gaëlle Lebert as Marie-Astrid
- Vincent Desagnat as Charles-Edouard
- Rudi Rosenberg as Charles-Antoine
- Victoria Abril as Duquessa Pilar de Malaga i Benidorm
- Rossy de Palma as Duquessa Maria de Malaga i Benidorm
- Hélène de Fougerolles as Marie-Stéphanie Montcougnet
- Catherine Hosmalin as Aristo hostess
- Chantal Ladesou as Aristo hostess
- Sébastien Cauet as Lawyer Convert
- Edith Perret as Countess Marthe Ambroisine
- Eric Le Roch as Stanislas Montcougnet
- Benjamin Castera as Charles-Eric
- Antoine de Turckheim as Charles-Victor
- Arthur Derancourt as Charles-Hubert
- Oscar Derancourt as Charles-Gustave
- Sébastien Cotterot as Gonzague
- Swann Arlaud as A good looking man
- Stéphane Bern as TV Host
- Alban Lenoir as Bad guy 2
