= Big Is Beautiful =

2012 French film

- Film poster
- French: Mince alors!
- Directed by: Charlotte de Turckheim
- Written by: Charlotte de Turckheim; Gladys Marciano; Jeanne Le Guillou
- Produced by: Dominique Besnehard; Anne Derré; Michel Feller; Christine Gozlan
- Starring: Victoria Abril; Lola Dewaere; Catherine Hosmalin
- Cinematography: Pierre Aïm
- Edited by: Scott Stevenson
- Music by: Éric Neveux
- Production companies: TF1 Droits Audiovisuels; UGC; M6 Films
- Distributed by: UGC Distribution
- Release date: 28 March 2012
- Running time: 100 minutes
- Country: France
- Language: French
- Budget: $8 million
- Box office: $11.6 million

Big Is Beautiful (French: Mince alors!) is a 2012 French comedy film, directed by Charlotte de Turckheim and starring Lola Dewaere, Victoria Abril and Catherine Hosmalin.

== Plot ==
The young, round and lovely Nina is married to Gaspard, who, unfortunately, rather likes very thin women. The couple move to Paris and Nina is preparing to launch a sophisticated line of swimwear. Because of her love for her husband, Nina accepts his ambiguous gift: a slimming treatment at Brides-les-Bains, considered "the last hope of the fat". There, she makes two flamboyant friends. Sophie, a lawyer from Marseille who likes to control everything, including herself. Émilie is a caregiver whose weight has begun to affect her health and her love life yet her motto remains, "Big is beautiful".

== Cast ==
- Lola Dewaere as Nina
- Victoria Abril as Sophie
- Catherine Hosmalin as Emilie
- Grégory Fitoussi as Gaspard
- Mehdi Nebbou as Doctor Hachemi
- Julia Piaton as Roxanne
- Raphaël Lenglet as Yussuf
- Dominique Besnehard as Antoine
- Martin Daquin as Thomas
- Pauline Lefèvre as Natacha
- Anouk Aimée as Mom
- Charlotte de Turckheim as Christelle
- Pascal Légitimus as Freddy
- Christine Citti as Roxanne's mother
- Frédéric Chau as Baptiste
- Claudine Wilde as Gundrun
- Émilie Gavois-Kahn as Nathalie
- Pascal Liger as Hans
- Valérie Moreau as Isabelle
- Alain Stern as Fred
- Barbara Bolotner as Jessica
- Vincent Bowen as Romain
- Jean-Baptiste Perichon as Léo
- David Salles as Andrej
- Jitka Grekova as Xenia
- Eric Boucher as Jean-Paul
- Alexis Sellam as Monsieur Scrabble
- Pablo Pauly as The driver
