= Sylvain Tesson =

French writer and traveller (born 1972)

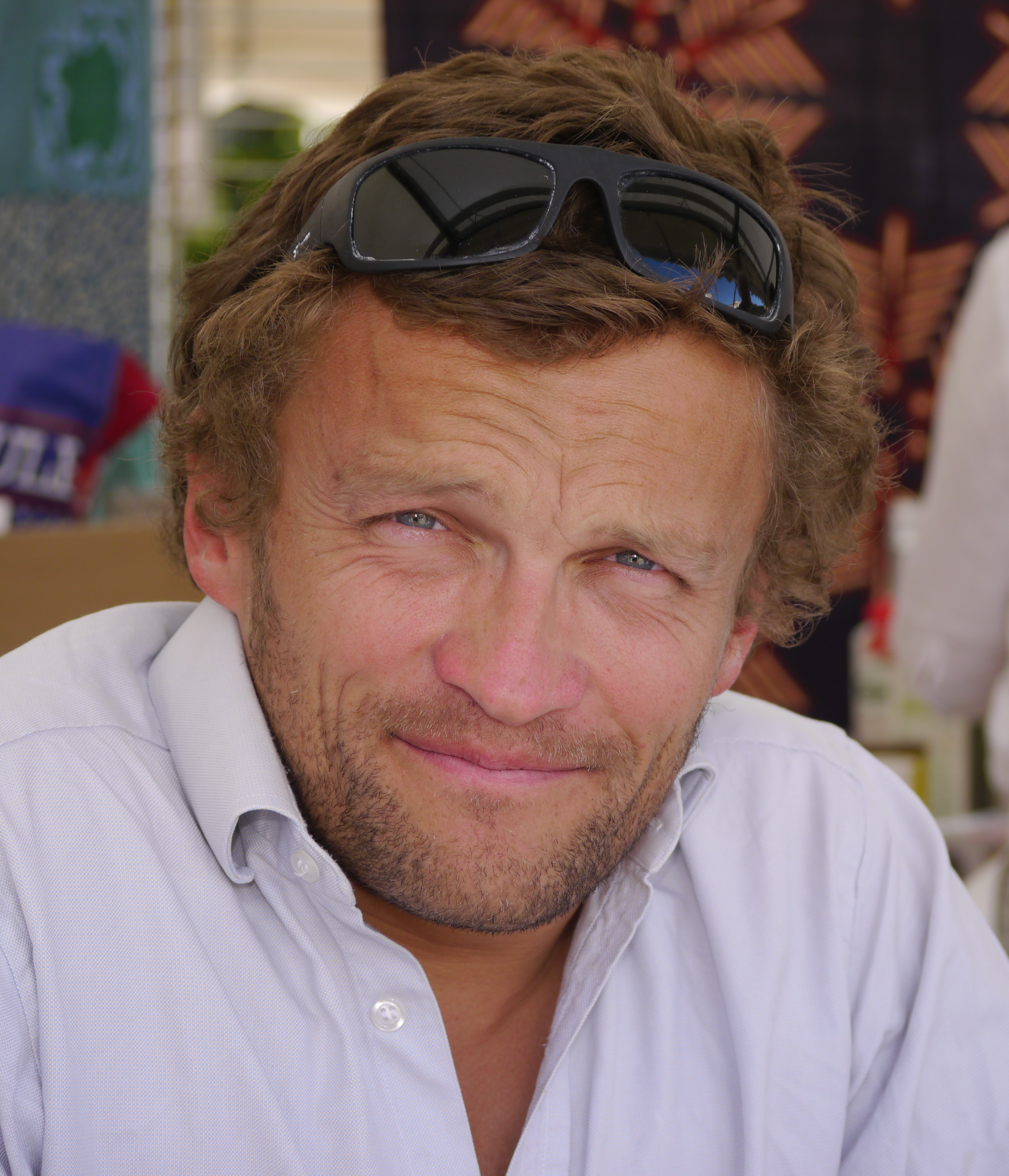
- Tesson in 2011
- Born: 26 April 1972 (age 54); Paris, France
- Occupation: Writer

Sylvain Tesson (born 26 April 1972) is a French writer and traveller born in Paris. He has engaged in a number of unusual travels and expeditions which are the basis for his books. Among his most successful works are The Consolations of the Forest (2011), about a project to live alone in a Siberian cabin for six months and The Art of Patience (2019), about the quest for snow leopards in Tibet. For the latter book, he received the Prix Renaudot.

== Early life ==
Sylvain Tesson is the son of Marie-Claude Tesson and the journalist Philippe Tesson who founded the French newspaper Le Quotidien de Paris. His sisters are the actress Stephanie Tesson and the art journalist Daphne Tesson. He is a geographer by background and holds a degree in geopolitics.

== Travels and writing ==
In 1991, he crossed central Iceland on a motorcycle, and then took part in a cave exploration in Borneo. In 1993 and 1994, he toured the world by bicycle with Alexandre Poussin, whom he had known since secondary school. The two friends then completed their studies in geography. He wrote about the trip in 1996, in the book On a roulé sur la terre, for which he received the youth IGN prize.

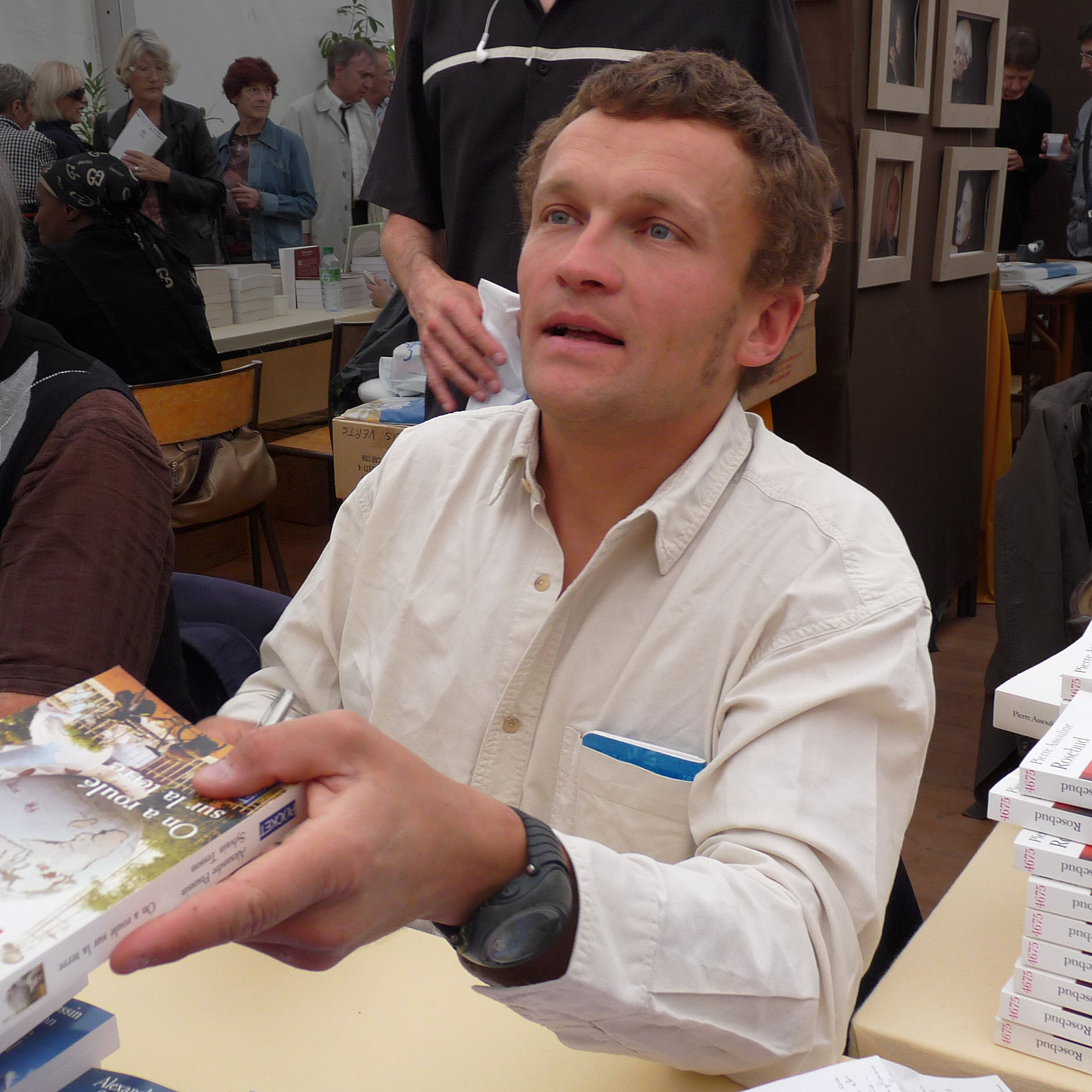
Tesson signing books in Nancy in 2011

Again with Poussin, in 1997 he crossed the Himalayas by foot, a five-month journey of 5000 kilometres from Bhutan to Tajikistan. He and Poussin then collaborated on the book La Marche dans le ciel: 5000 km à pied à travers l'Himalaya in 1998. In 1999 and 2000, he and photographer Priscilla Telmon crossed the steppes of central Asia from Kazakhstan to Uzbekistan on horseback. That trip led to two books: La Chevauchée des steppes in 2001, and Carnets de Steppes: à cheval à travers l'Asie centrale in 2002. In 2001 and 2002, he participated in archaeological expeditions in Pakistan and Afghanistan.

From May 2003 to January 2004, he followed the route allegedly used by Sławomir Rawicz to escape the gulag as Rawicz described in his book, The Long Walk (1955). Rawicz travelled from Yakutsk in Siberia to Calcutta in India on foot. Tesson concluded the journey was plausible, though there are inconsistencies, such as Rawicz's claim of ten days without water in the Gobi. Tesson wrote a book with photographer Thomas Goisque based on this experience, Sous l'étoile de la liberté. Six mille kilomètres à travers l'Eurasie sauvage ("Under the star of liberty. Six thousand kilometers across the Eurasian wild.")

In 2010, Tesson undertook a project to live alone for six months on the shores of Lake Baikal in a rustic cabin during winter, about 50 km north of Irkutsk. In his own words, "the recipe for happiness: a window on Baikal, a table by the window". He recounted his time in Siberia in a book The Consolations of the Forest: Alone in a Cabin on the Siberian Taiga. It won the 2014 Dolman Best Travel Book Award. He also released a film titled Alone, 180 days on Lake Baikal (2011), directed by Tesson and Florence Tran, and the book was adapted into the drama film In the Forests of Siberia (2016), directed by Safy Nebbou and starring Raphaël Personnaz. Between 2011 and 2018 Tesson was the president of an NGO, La Guilde Européenne du Raid. In 2015 he won the Prix de la Page 112.

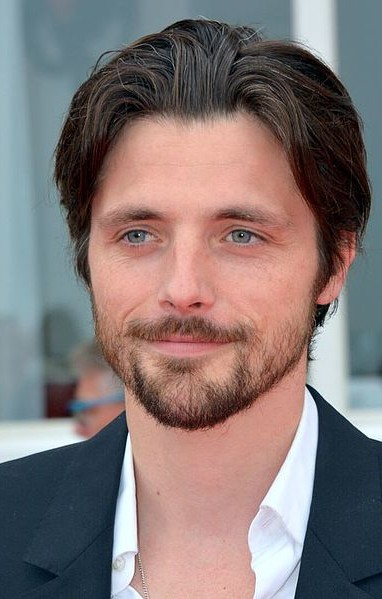
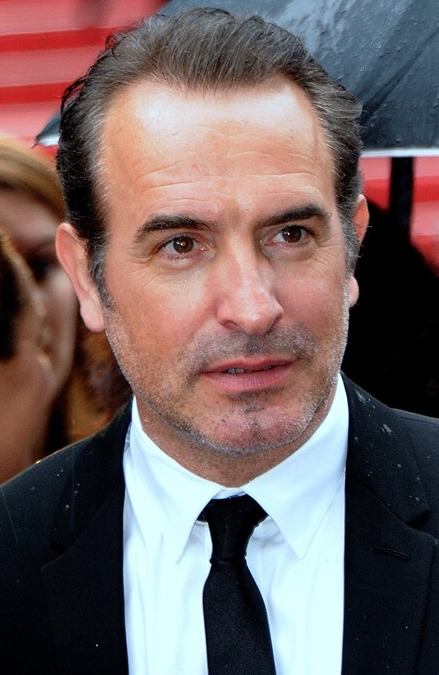
Raphaël Personnaz and Jean Dujardin have played main characters in film adaptations of Tesson's autobiographical books.

On the night of 21 to 22 August 2014, Tesson fell from the roof of a chalet in Chamonix which made him suffer four skull fractures and put him in a coma. He survived and woke up, but was left paralysed on the right half of his face. The accident made him decide to cross France on foot, which became the subject of his travel book On the Wandering Paths (2016). The book is the basis for the 2023 film On the Wandering Paths, starring Jean Dujardin.

Tesson has written two installments of the radio programme and book series Un été avec. He wrote Un été avec Homère about Homer in 2017 and Un été avec Rimbaud about Arthur Rimbaud in 2020.

The Art of Patience came into being when the wildlife photographer Vincent Munier invited Tesson to Tibet to seek out snow leopards. It is Tesson's book about this experience and gave him the 2019 Prix Renaudot. Munier's and Tesson's quest for snow leopards is also the subject of the film The Velvet Queen (2021), which received the César Award for Best Documentary Film.

Three of Tesson's books have been adapted into comics by Virgile Dureuil: The Consolations of the Forest in 2019, Berezina in 2021 and L'Axe du loup in 2023.

== Style ==
Stereotypes and Clichés: Critics like Bruce Bégout accuse Tesson of relying on outdated and picturesque literary stereotypes, often found in travel literature. Guillaume Thouroude's book contrasts "new explorers" like Tesson, who recycle adventurer clichés, with more innovative authors. Thouroude criticizes Tesson for having a "haughty view of the world."

Neocolonial Ideology: Jean-Xavier Ridon argues that Tesson's books, under a humanist appearance, promote a neocolonial ideology, particularly through generalizations about other cultures, especially Russians, likening his writing to Orientalism. Ridon also questions the authenticity of Tesson's depiction of solitude and danger.

Reactionary Style: Evelyne Pieiller from Le Monde diplomatique characterizes Tesson as part of a reactionary tradition, connected to writers like Roger Nimier and Louis-Ferdinand Céline, mourning modernity's decline and idealizing hierarchical order. Some media and critics, like L'Express, describe Tesson as an "icon of reactionism" and part of the "anti-modern right."

Political Ties: Tesson is associated with far-right political circles, such as his connections to figures of the Nouvelle Droite and involvement with Radio Courtoisie, a far-right radio station. François Krug includes him in his book on the literary far-right, citing Tesson's admiration for controversial intellectuals Jean Raspail and Dominique Venner.

Recent Controversy: In January 2024, Tesson's nomination as a patron of the Printemps des poètes festival sparked backlash. A petition signed by 2,000 cultural figures criticized his appointment, arguing it normalized far-right ideologies. This was countered by defenders like Jack Lang and other public figures, who dismissed the criticism as an attack on poetry itself. The controversy led to the resignation of the festival's artistic director, Sophie Nauleau. Some, like Mohammed Aïssaoui, viewed the backlash as a reflection of funding rivalries within the cultural sector.

== Selected bibliography ==
- On a roulé sur la terre (1996)
- La Marche dans le ciel : 5000 km à pied à travers l'Himalaya (1998)
- La Chevauchée des steppes (2001)
- Carnets de Steppes : à cheval à travers l'Asie centrale (2002)
- L'Axe du loup : de la Sibérie à l'Inde, sur les pas des évadés du goulag (2004)
- Sous l'étoile de la Liberté : six mille kilomètres à travers l'Eurasie sauvage (2005)
- The Consolations of the Forest: Alone in a Cabin on the Siberian Taiga (Dans les forêts de Sibérie) (2011; English 2012)
- Berezina: From Moscow to Paris Following Napoleon's Epic Fail (Berezina : en side-car avec Napoléon) (2015; English 2019)
- On the Wandering Paths (Sur les chemins noirs) (2016; English 2022)
- Un été avec Homère (2018)
- The Art of Patience: Seeking the Snow Leopard in Tibet (La Panthère des neiges) (2019; English 2021)
- Un été avec Rimbaud (2021)
- Une ode à la vie (2022)
- Avec les fées (2024)

== Filmography ==
- Of Penguins and Men (Des manchots et des hommes) (2004, writer: voice-over)
- Un lac en hiver (2005, co-writer and co-director with Sibylle D'Orgeval)
- Alone, 180 Days on Lake Baikal (6 mois de cabane au Baïkal) (2011, writer and co-director with Florence Tran)
- In the Forests of Siberia (Dans les forêts de Sibérie) (2016, source material)
- The Velvet Queen (La Panthère des neiges) (2021, narrator)
- On the Wandering Paths (2023, source material)
