= The Hunt for the Unicorn Killer =

- Based on: The Unicorn's Secret by Steven Levy
- Written by: Bruce Graham
- Directed by: William A. Graham
- Starring: Naomi Watts, Kevin Anderson, Tom Skerritt
- Music by: Chris Boardman
- Country of origin: United States
- Original language: English

Production
- Producers: Arnon Milchan, Dan Wigutow
- Cinematography: Ralf D. Bode
- Running time: 165 minutes
- Production companies: Dan Wigutow Productions; Regency Television

Original release
- Network: NBC
- Release: May 9 – May 10, 1999

The Hunt for the Unicorn Killer is a thriller/drama television film that first aired on NBC from May 9 to May 10, 1999, as a two-part miniseries.

It starred Kevin Anderson, Naomi Watts, and Tom Skerritt. Anderson plays 1970s activist and purported Earth Day co-founder Ira Einhorn, who is charged with, and later convicted in absentia of, the murder of his girlfriend Holly Maddux (played by Watts). Skerritt plays Maddux's father, who tries to bring Einhorn to justice.

== Cast ==
- Kevin Anderson as Ira Einhorn
- Tom Skerritt as Fred Maddux
- Naomi Watts as Holly Maddux
- Kellie Overbey as Megan "Meg" Maddux
- Ruben Santiago-Hudson as Detective Newhouse
- Brian Kerwin as Saul Lapidus
- Josef Sommer as Corporate Man
- William G. Schilling as Robert Stevens
- Albert Schultz as Lucas Rothman
- Mimi Kuzyk as Barbra Bronfman
- Gregory Itzin as Arlen Specter
- Rosemary Murphy as Bea Einhorn
- Bill MacDonald as Police Lieutenant
- Martin Donovan as Richard DiBenedetto
- Wanda Cannon as Liz Maddux
- Kristin Booth as Buffy Maddux
- Angela Vint as Mary Maddux
- Kirby Morrow as John Maddux
- Rosemary Dunsmore as Holly's Counselor
- Damir Andrei as Book Editor
- Philippe Ayoub as Mitchell Snyder (credited as Philip Ayoub)
- Marcia Bennett as Judge's Secretary
- Catherine Blythe as Café Manager
- Robert Bockstael as Professor
- Nicu Branzea as Andrua Puharich
- Ian D. Clark as Denis Weaire
- Gina Clayton as Joann DiBenedetto
- Matt Cooke as Harry Jay Katz
- Susan Coyne as Sandra Rothman
- Jon Cubrt as Paul Herre
- Yuval Daniel as Uri Geller
- Hugo Dann as Investigator #1
- Louis Di Bianco as Mayor Frank Rizzo
- Martin Doyle as Enquirer Reporter
- Reg Dreger as Governor Tom Ridge
- Carolyn Dunn as Annika Flodin Einhorn
- Roger Dunn as Harvard Dean
- Donna Goodhand as Head District Attorney
- Ron Hartmann as Judge Foley
- Niki Holt as Nina (credited as Nicole Hughes)
- Maggie Huculak as Social Worker
- Jeffrey Knight as T.V. Reporter
- Louisa Martin as Colette Weaire
- Bruce McFee as FBI Supervisor
- Deborah Pollitt as Co-Op Worker
- Michael Rhoades as Bernard Segal
- Elisabeth Rosen as Jean Marie
- Richard Sali as Morris Gelman
- Kim Schraner as Shelly
- Jacques Tourangeau as Dominique Tricaud
- Nicole Underhay as Dorm Roommate
- Robin Ward as Debate Moderator
- Jennifer Wigmore as Rita Siegel
- Kim Roberts as Jury Foreperson
- Kim Poirier as Affair Girl (scenes deleted) (uncredited)
