= Chic! =

- Film poster
- Directed by: Jérôme Cornuau
- Written by: Jean-Paul Bathany
- Produced by: Alain Terzian
- Starring: Fanny Ardant; Marina Hands; Éric Elmosnino; Laurent Stocker; Catherine Hosmalin; Philippe Duquesne; India Hair
- Cinematography: Stéphane Cami
- Edited by: Brian Schmitt
- Music by: René Aubry
- Production companies: Alter Films; StudioCanal; France 2 Cinéma
- Distributed by: StudioCanal
- Release date: 7 January 2015
- Running time: 103 minutes
- Country: France
- Language: French
- Budget: $8.2 million
- Box office: $495.000

Chic! is a 2015 French romantic comedy film directed by Jérôme Cornuau.

== Cast ==
- Fanny Ardant as Alicia Ricosi
- Marina Hands as Hélène Birk
- Éric Elmosnino as Julien Lefort
- Laurent Stocker as Alan Bergam
- Catherine Hosmalin as Caroline Langer
- Philippe Duquesne as Jean-Guy
- India Hair as Karine Lefort
