= Jean Rolin (writer) =

French writer and journalist

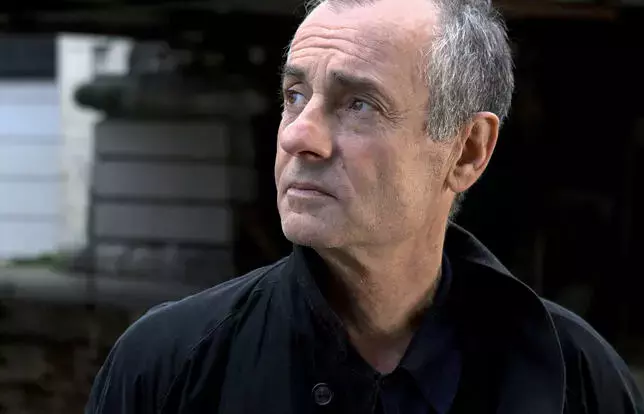
Jean Rolin

Jean Philippe Rolin (born 14 June 1949 in Boulogne-Billancourt) is a French writer and journalist. He received the Albert Londres Prize for journalism in 1988, and his novel L'organisation received the Medicis award in 1996.

His brother Olivier Rolin is a writer as well.

As students, Jean Rolin and his brother participated in the May 1968 uprising and its aftermath, as narrated in L'organisation.

== Biography ==
The son of a military doctor, Jean Rolin grew up in Brittany (in Dinard), the Congo (in Léopoldville), and Sénégal (in Dakar). Returning to Paris in the mid-1960s, he attended the Lycée Louis-le-Grand. As a student, he became involved—like his brother Olivier, two years his senior—in the Proletarian Left, and in the late 1960s worked as a laborer in various companies in Saint-Nazaire, as he recounts in his book L’Organisation (Medicis Prize, 1996).

From 1980 onwards, he wrote novels, travelogues, and columns, while also working as a journalist for publications including Libération, Le Figaro, L'Événement du jeudi, Lui Le Monde, and L'Autre Journal. Jean Rolin used his documentary precision as a tool for a sober poetic form, where the use of the first person singular is imbued with subtle humor. During a symposium at the Sorbonne in 2016, Jean Rolin, literature in situ, various researchers worked on "putting the writer in context, drawing on reportage without ruling out fiction. Writing is closely linked to the discovery of a place, topographed, surveyed, recomposed; it feeds on the way things are seen, on the memories that emerge from contact with them, on the reflections or daydreams that inevitably follow."

As Philippe Lançon wrote about La Traversée de Bondoufle in Charlie Hebdo (September 14, 2022): “Whether it's Christians in Palestine, ring roads, the Strait of Hormuz, or stray dogs, he paints a Proustian picture of life that clings on or develops in almost always unexpected ways, between resistance, improvisation, and fantasy, in places that people avoid and that humanity ravages.” Indeed, Jean Rolin is a great admirer of Marcel Proust's writing. He also admires the works of Louis-Ferdinand Céline, Raymond Queneau, Pierre Mac Orlan, Flannery O'Connor, Annie Ernaux, etc.

Since 2008, Jean Rolin has been a member of the Les Écrivains de marine (Marine Writers).

== Bibliography ==
- Journal de Gand aux Aléoutiennes (Roger Nimier Prize 1982)
- L'Or du scaphandrier, 1983
- Vu sur la mer, 1986
- La Ligne de Front (Prix Albert Londres 1988)
- La frontière belge, 1989
- Chemins d'eau, 1992
- Cyrille et Méthode, 1994
- Joséphine, 1994
- Zones, 1995
- L'organisation (Prix Médicis 1996)
- Traverses, 1999
- Campagnes, 2000
- La Clôture, 2002
- Chrétiens, 2003
- Terminal Frigo, 2005
- L'Homme qui a vu l'ours (Prix Ptolémée 2006)
- L'explosion de la durite, 2007
- Un chien mort après lui, 2009
- Le Ravissement de Britney Spears, 2011
- Ormuz, 2013
- Les Événements, 2015
- Savannah, 2015
- Peleliu, 2016
- Le Traquet kurde, 2018
- Crac, 2019
