= Qui c'est les plus forts? =

Qui c'est les plus forts ?
- Film poster
- Directed by: Charlotte de Turckheim
- Screenplay by: Charlotte de Turckheim
- Based on: the play Sunderland by Clément Koch
- Produced by: Philippe Carcassonne; Richard Pezet
- Starring: Alice Pol; Audrey Lamy; Grégory Fitoussi
- Cinematography: Dominique Bouilleret
- Edited by: Noémie Azul Loeve; Florent Vassault
- Music by: Polérik Rouvière
- Production company: Ciné@
- Distributed by: Wild Bunch Distribution
- Release date: 3 June 2015
- Running time: 103 minutes
- Country: France
- Language: French
- Budget: $7 million
- Box office: $1.1 million

Qui c'est les plus forts? is a 2015 French film directed by Charlotte de Turckheim.

== Background ==
The film is an adaptation of Sunderland, a 2011 play written by Clément Koch.

== Summary ==
Samantha, who works in a chicken factory in Saint-Étienne, loses her job. She lives with her best-friend Céline. She is also her little sister Kim's guardian and must find another job quickly or run the risk of losing her sister. She meets Paul, a lawyer who would like to raise a child with his partner. As a result, he asks Samantha if she would like to be hired as his surrogate.

== Cast ==
- Alice Pol as Sam
- Audrey Lamy as Céline
- Bruno Sanches as Dylan
- Anna Lemarchand as Kim
- Grégory Fitoussi as Paul
- Julia Piaton as Pépin
- Charlotte de Turckheim as Madame Galacher
- Catherine Hosmalin as Solange
- Daniel Lobé as Gordon
- Barbara Bolotner as Valou
- Émilie Gavois-Kahn as Employment Center hostess

== Production ==
Filming took place in the Loire department, including in Saint-Étienne, Saint-Paul-en-Jarez, Saint-Chamond and Planfoy. Some scenes were shot at the Stade Geoffroy-Guichard in Saint-Étienne.

== Critical reception ==
Reviewing it for Têtu, a French gay magazine, Paul Parant called it, "a perfect mix of seriousness and irony, at times leading to moments of genuine laughter." He went on to highlight its "good acting and well-written script."
