= Mademoiselle Holmes =

- Genre: Mystery
- Created by: Victoria Spennato
- Based on: Sherlock Holmes by Arthur Conan Doyle
- Starring: Lola Dewaere; Tom Villa; Daniel Prévost
- Music by: François Liétout
- Country of origin: France
- Original language: French

Production
- Running time: 52 minutes

Original release
- Network: TF1
- Release: 11 April 2024

Mademoiselle Holmes is a French television series, inspired by the Sherlock Holmes stories.

== Synopsis ==
Shy French cop Charlie Holmes is the great-granddaughter of the great British detective Sherlock Holmes. She uses her hereditary deductive brilliance to solve crimes with the aid of Samy Vatel, her Dr. Watson substitute.

== Cast ==
- Lola Dewaere as Charlie Holmes
- Tom Villa as Samy Vatel
- Daniel Prévost as George Holmes
- Thomas Jouannet as Chris Hervieu
- Alika Del Sol as Florence Billon

== Release ==
The series was broadcast from 11 April 2024, on TF1.
