= Marius (2013 film) =

- Film poster
- Directed by: Daniel Auteuil
- Written by: Daniel Auteuil
- Based on: Marius by Marcel Pagnol
- Produced by: Julien Madon; Alain Sarde; Jérôme Seydoux
- Starring: Raphaël Personnaz; Daniel Auteuil; Victoire Bélézy
- Cinematography: Jean-François Robin
- Edited by: Joëlle Hache
- Music by: Alexandre Desplat
- Production companies: A.S. Films; Pathé Production; Zack Films
- Distributed by: Pathé Distribution
- Release date: 10 July 2013
- Running time: 93 minutes
- Country: France
- Language: French
- Budget: $7.6 million
- Box office: $2.2 million

Marius is a 2013 film adaptation of the play of the same name by Marcel Pagnol. It stars Raphaël Personnaz, Daniel Auteuil, Victoire Bélézy, Marie-Anne Chazel, Jean-Pierre Darroussin, Daniel Russo, Rufus and Nicolas Vaude. Auteuil also directed and wrote the screenplay.

== Cast ==
- Daniel Auteuil as César
- Raphaël Personnaz as Marius
- Jean-Pierre Darroussin as Panisse
- Victoire Bélézy as Fanny
- Marie-Anne Chazel as Honorine
- Nicolas Vaude as Monsieur Brun
- Daniel Russo as Escartefigue
- Rufus as Piquoiseau
- Jean-Louis Barcelona as Frisepoulet
- Martine Diotalevi as Madame Escartefigue

== Critical response ==
On the review aggregator website Rotten Tomatoes, the film has an approval rating of 50%, based on ten reviews, with an average rating of 5.38/10. On Metacritic, the film has a weighted average score of 50 out of 100, based on 8 critics, indicating "mixed or average reviews".

== Accolades ==
Award / Film Festival	Category	Recipients and nominees	Result
Lumière Awards	Best Male Revelation	Raphaël Personnaz	Won
World Soundtrack Awards	Soundtrack Composer of the Year	Alexandre Desplat	Won
