= The Five Paradoxes of Modernity =

1990 book by Antoine Compagnon

- Author: Antoine Compagnon
- Original title: Les cinq paradoxes de la modernité
- Translator: Franklin Philip
- Language: French
- Publisher: Éditions du Seuil
- Publication date: 1 February 1990
- Publication place: France
- English publication date: October 1994
- Pages: 192
- ISBN: 2-02-011462-3

The Five Paradoxes of Modernity (French: Les cinq paradoxes de la modernité) is a 1990 book by the French writer Antoine Compagnon.

== Summary ==
The book is about modernity in relation to its theories of art and progress, beginning with Georg Wilhelm Friedrich Hegel's progressive conceptions of art history and the purpose of art. Antoine Compagnon, a scholar of French literature, argues that since Charles Baudelaire, modernity has undergone five major crises, each corresponding to an unresolved paradox present in its theories about art. He summarises the five paradoxes as "the superstition of the new, the religion of the future, the mania for theory, the appeal to mass culture, and the passion for repudiation".

== See also ==
- Les antimodernes, another book by Compagnon
