= Prix Patrick Dewaere =

French acting award

- Awarded for: Rewards young male talents in French cinema
- Country: France
- First award: 2008
- Website: prixromyschneideretpatrickdewaere.org

The Prix Patrick Dewaere is awarded annually to a young and upcoming actor working in the French film industry.

It was initiated in 2008 and is named after the French actor Patrick Dewaere (1947–1982). It replaced the Prix Jean Gabin which was awarded from 1981 to 2006. The prize is awarded by a jury each year in Paris in conjunction with the Prix Romy Schneider.

== Recipients ==
Year	Recipient(s)	Nationality
2008	Jocelyn Quivrin	France
2009	Louis Garrel	France
2010	Tahar Rahim	France
2011	Gilles Lellouche	France
2012	Joey Starr	France
2013	Raphaël Personnaz	France
2014	Pierre Niney	France
2015	Reda Kateb	France
2016	Vincent Lacoste	France
