= Olivier Rolin =

French writer (born 1947)

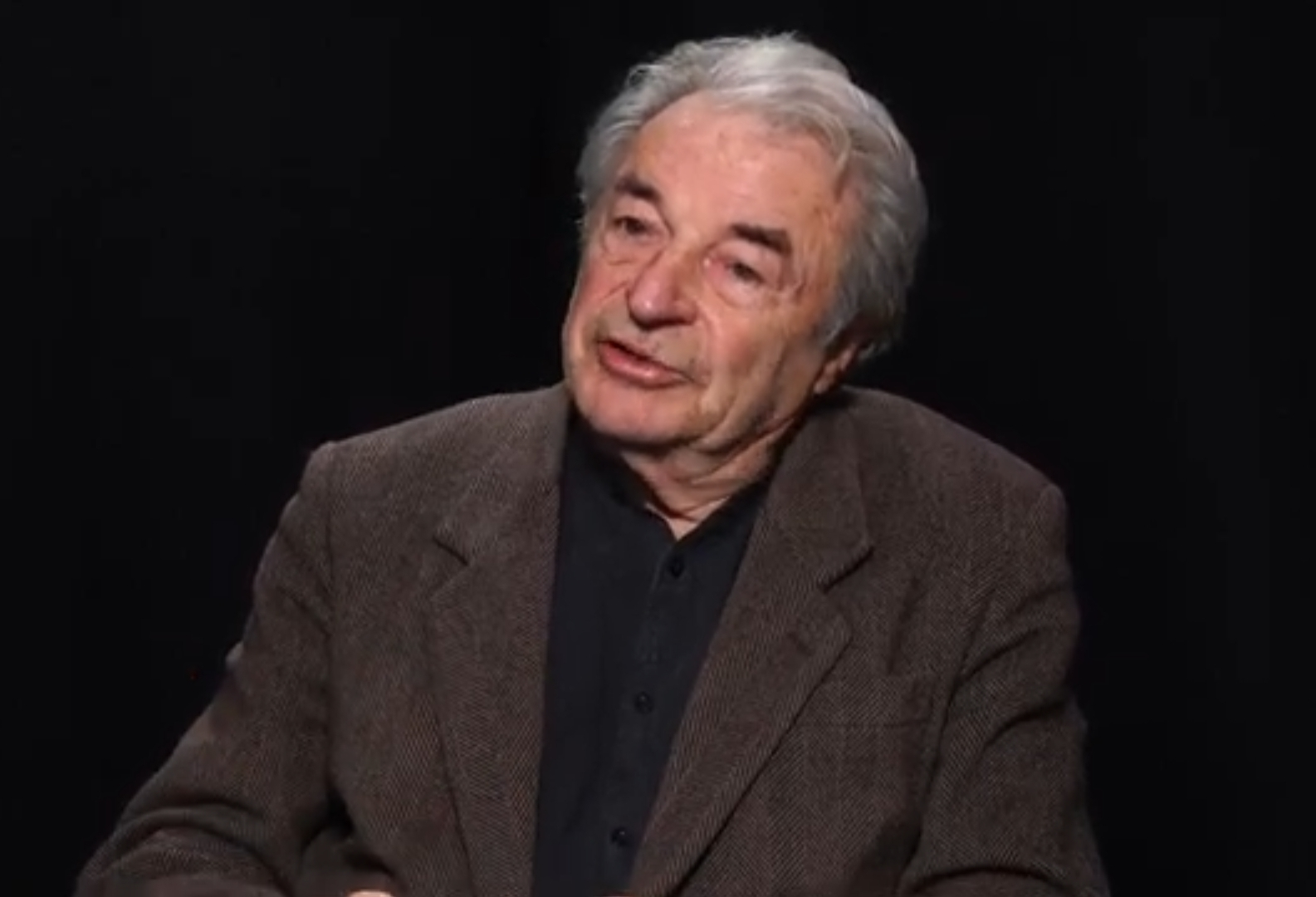
Olivier Rolin (2024)

Olivier Rolin (French pronunciation: [ɔlivje ʁɔlɛ̃]; born 17th May 1947 in Boulogne-Billancourt) is a French writer. He won the Prix Femina in 1994, for his novel Port-Soudan.

His brother Jean is also a writer and journalist.
