= Olivier Frébourg =

French journalist, writer and publisher

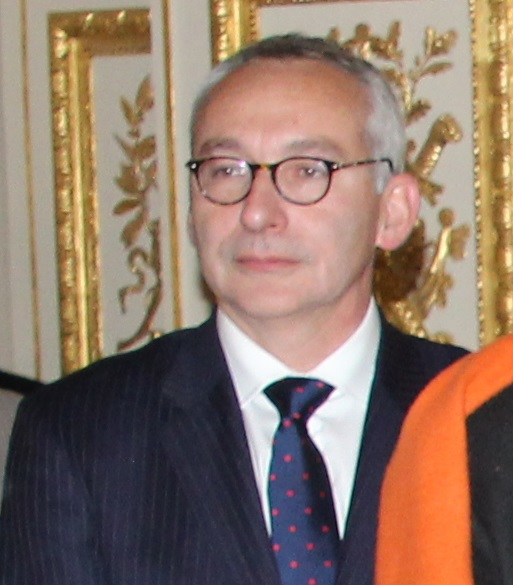
Olivier Frébourg Portrait

Olivier Frébourg is a French journalist, writer and publisher.

== Career ==
As a journalist, Frébourg wrote for Libération, Le Figaro Littéraire, Géo (as great reporter), le Figaro Magazine, Grands Reportages, Air France Magazine and several foreign newspapers.

A literary advisor at Éditions du Rocher from 1988 to 1990, then literary director at La Table Ronde from 1992 to 2003, he created the Éditions des Équateurs in 2003.

Always fascinated by the sea, himself an "emeritus" navigator, he was received among Les Écrivains de marine in October 2004, a literary group founded by Jean-François Deniau.

== Works ==
- 1989: Roger Nimier. Trafiquant d'insolence, éditions du Rocher, series "Les Infréquentables", ISBN 2-268-00788-X BnF 36999441g, 375193410 - Prix des Deux-Magots
- 1991: Basse saison, Albin Michel, ISBN 2226054189 - Prix du premier roman de la ville de Caen
- 1994: La vie sera plus belle, Albin Michel, ISBN 2226069615 - Prix des lycées d’Ile de France
- 1998: Port d'attache, Albin Michel, ISBN 2226095993 - Prix François Mauriac de l'Académie française, Prix Queffélec
- 1998: Souviens-toi de Lisbonne, La Table Ronde, ISBN 2710365316
- 2000: Maupassant, le clandestin, reprint Gallimard series "Folio" ISBN 2070419800 - Prix du Cercle de la Mer
- 2001: La Normandie, National Geographic, reprint in 2004 ISBN 2845820208 - photographs by Hélène Bamberger (National Géographic)
- 2002: Ports mythiques, Éditions du Chêne, ISBN 2842774205
- 2002: Esquisses normandes, National Geographic, ISBN 2845820607
- 2004: Vietnam, Chine, ISBN 2842774760 - (photographs by Nicolas Cornet)
- 2004: Un homme à la mer, Mercure de France, ISBN 2715224974
- 2011: Gaston et Gustave, Mercure de France, ISBN 2715232276 - Prix Décembre
- 2014: La Grande Nageuse, Mercure de France, ISBN 978-2-7152-3543-4

- Preface to the complete works of Louis Brauquier and the volume Romans et essais by Bernard Frank.
