= Antoine Compagnon =

French literary critic, teacher, writer and professor (born 1950)

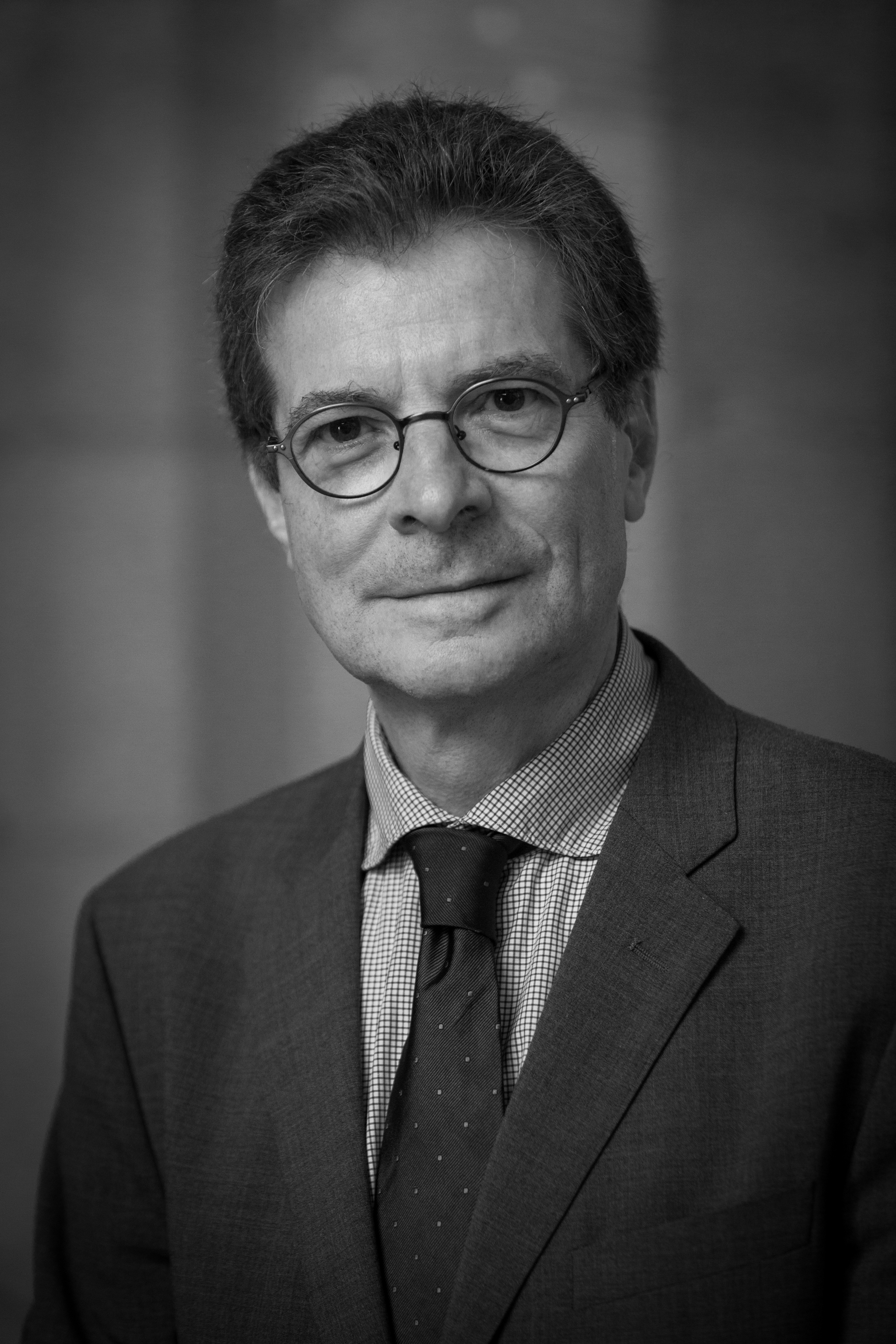
- Antoine Compagnon in 2015
- Born: 20 July 1950 (age 76); Brussels, Belgium
- Education: École Polytechnique
- Known for: Member of the Académie Française

Antoine Compagnon (French pronunciation: [ɑ̃twan kɔ̃paɲɔ̃]; born 20 July 1950 in Brussels, Belgium) is a Professor of French Literature at Collège de France, Paris (2006–), and the Blanche W. Knopf Professor of French and Comparative Literature at Columbia University, New York City (1985–).

== Education ==
Compagnon studied at École Polytechnique (1970) and École nationale des Ponts et Chaussées (1975), and holds a Doctorate of Paris Diderot University (1985).

== Career ==
Compagnon was a Fellow of the Fondation Thiers (1975-1978), taught at École Polytechnique (1978-1985), Institut français du Royaume-Uni, London (1980-1981), University of Rouen (1981-1985), was a visiting professor at the University of Pennsylvania, Philadelphia (1986, 1990), Fellow of the John Simon Guggenheim Memorial Foundation (1988), Professor at University of Maine (France), Le Mans (1989-1990), visiting fellow at All Souls College, Oxford (1994), Professor at Paris-Sorbonne University (1994-2006).

He is a Fellow of the American Academy of Arts and Sciences (1997) and Academia Europaea (2006), and a Corresponding Fellow of the British Academy (2009). He received an Honorary Degree of King's College London (2010), HEC Paris (2012), and University of Liège (2013), and the Claude Lévi-Strauss Prize of the Académie des sciences morales et politiques (2011).

In 2012, Compagnon did a daily broadcast on France Inter, Un été avec Montaigne. The programme was published as a book which became a bestseller in 2013. He has done several more Un été avec series, including Un été avec Baudelaire in 2014. In 2013, he curated a show of Proust's manuscripts from the Bibliothèque nationale de France at the Morgan Library.

== Publications ==
- La Seconde Main ou le travail de la citation (Seuil, 1979).
- Le Deuil antérieur (Seuil, 1979).
- Nous, Michel de Montaigne (Seuil, 1980).
- La Troisième République des Lettres (Seuil, 1983).
- Ferragosto (Flammarion, 1985).
- Proust entre deux siècles (Seuil, 1989).
- Les Cinq Paradoxes de la modernité (Seuil, 1990).
- L’Esprit de l’Europe (Flammarion, 1993).
- Chat en poche. Montaigne et l’allégorie (Seuil, 1993).
- Connaissez-vous Brunetière ? (Seuil, 1997).
- Le Démon de la théorie (Seuil, 1998).
- Baudelaire devant l’innombrable (PUPS, 2003).
- Les Antimodernes, de Joseph de Maistre à Roland Barthes (Gallimard, 2005).
- La Littérature, pour quoi faire ? (Collège de France / Fayard, 2007).
- Que reste-t-il de la culture française ? (Denoël, 2008).
- Le Cas Bernard Faÿ. Du Collège de France à l’indignité nationale (Gallimard, 2009).
- La Classe de rhéto (Gallimard, 2012).
- Un été avec Montaigne (Équateurs / France Inter, 2013).
- Une question de discipline. Entretiens avec Jean-Baptiste Amadieu (Flammarion, 2013).
- Baudelaire l’irréductible (Flammarion, 2014).
- Un été avec Baudelaire (Équateurs / France Inter, 2015).
- Petits Spleens numériques (Équateurs, 2015).
- L’Âge des lettres (Gallimard, 2015).
- Un été avec Pascal (Équateurs / France Inter, 2020). Published in English as A Summer with Pascal, tr. Catherine Porter (The Belknap Press of Harvard University Press, 2024).
- Un été avec Colette (Équateurs / France Inter, 2022).

Compagnon edited Marcel Proust, Du côté de chez Swann (Gallimard, Folio, 1988), Sodome et Gomorrhe (Gallimard, Pléiade, 1988; Folio, 1989), Carnets, in collaboration (Gallimard, 2002); Albert Thibaudet, Réflexions sur la politique (Robert Laffont, Bouquins, 2007), Réflexions sur la littérature (Gallimard, Quarto, 2007); Charles Péguy, L’Argent (Équateurs, 2008); Paul Bourget, Le Disciple (Le Livre de Poche, 2010); Maurice Barrès, Mes cahiers (Équateurs, 2010).
