= Hamé =

Mohamed Bourokba, aka Hamé (born 1975, Perpignan, France) is a French filmmaker and rapper. He has been involved in a series of legal proceedings since 2002, which have been covered by the international press.

== Early life ==
Bourokba was the fifth in a family of six children, from two different mothers. The family settled in France during the 1950s. His Algerian father, who could neither read nor write, spent his life working as a farm labourer. After the death of his wife in the early 1970s, he remarried quickly for the sake of his three daughters. His new wife, Hamé's mother, was twenty years younger than he was. She also came from Algeria. She became a housekeeper and learned to read and write.

== Film ==
Wanting to surround himself with images, Hamé studied cinema at the Sorbonne. Rap played a big part in his life; he collaborated with the group La Rumeur, making several videos for the group. After obtaining his master's degree in film and literature, Hamé was awarded a scholarship. He spent a year at New York University's Tisch School of the Arts.

After creating five short films, Hamé returned to France. He wanted to write and direct films dealing with those subjects that were of greatest importance to him. "Je ne suis pas le gardien de mon frère" ("I am not my brother's keeper"), his first short film, received the support of CNC and French TV channel Arte, and addresses the subject of post-colonial immigration. Canal Plus signed him to write a hip hop musical about integrity and temptation. He has also written a feature film, Faux, the story of an impostor, which he hoped to shoot in 2012. Hamé was also working on writing a novel to be published by Les Editions du Seuil.

== French government lawsuit ==
Since 2002, Hamé has been involved with a series of legal proceedings which became a political tug of war, and which, due to their novelty, have been covered by the international press (Herald Tribune, El País, Frankfurter Allgemeine, Le Monde). After a pamphlet was published in the magazine La Rumeur, Nicolas Sarkozy, who was then interior minister, filed a complaint against Hamé. In his article, the author addressed the issue of insecurity in urban neighborhoods, concentrating on the role of the police and power politics. Hamé defended his statements on their merits, citing witnesses including academics, historians, sociologists and linguists. In the name of freedom of expression, he was acquitted at trial and on appeal. Hamé now faces returning to court for the third time. The interior ministry had never before pursued defamation charges so persistently. As of 2010, the case remained open.
