= Charlotte de Turckheim =

French actress, screenwriter, comedian and film producer (born 1955)

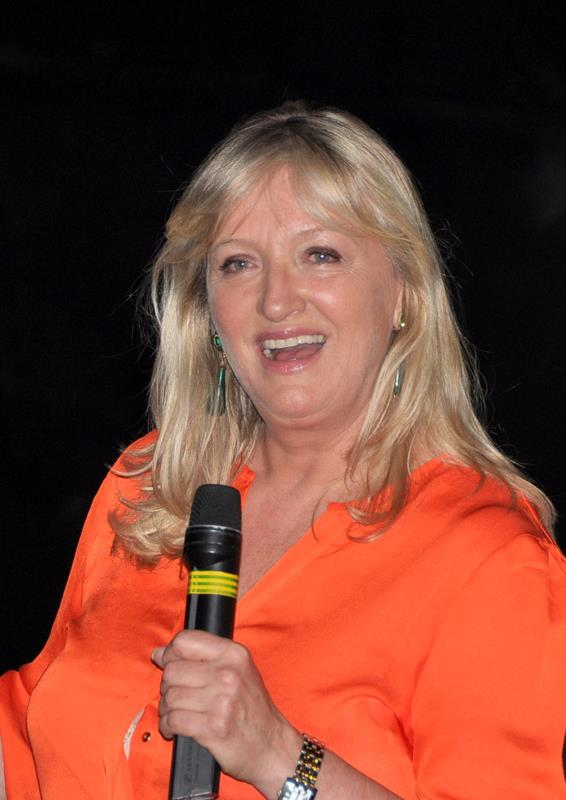
- Charlotte de Turckheim in 2012
- Born: Anne-Charlotte de Turckheim; 5 April 1955 (age 71); Montereau-Fault-Yonne, France
- Occupations: Actress, screenwriter, comedian, director
- Years active: 1975–present
- Children: 3 daughters, including Julia Piaton

Anne-Charlotte de Turckheim (born 5 April 1955) is a French actress, screenwriter, comedian and film producer.

== Personal life ==
Born in Montereau-Fault-Yonne, Seine-et-Marne, France, the daughter of Françoise Husson and Arnaud de Turckheim, a member of a noble Protestant family from Alsace, Charlotte de Turckheim studied theater after completing her baccalauréat degree.

The writer Émilie de Turckheim is her cousin.

== Television ==
In 2007, she participated in Rendez-vous en terre inconnue.

On 25 February 2014, it was announced that she would present a French version of the BBC's Antiques Roadshow.

In 2023, she was selected to be a 'traitor' in the second season of the French version of The Traitors. She was banished in episode eight.

In 2025, she was a contestant on the fourteen season of Danse avec les stars which premiered on 7 February.

== Filmography ==
=== Cinema ===
| Year | Title | Role | Director | Notes |
|---|---|---|---|---|
| 1975 | Le gibier | A cyclist | Bernard Launois | |
| 1980 | La nuit de la mort! | Nicole | Raphaël Delpard | |
| 1981 | Les Babas Cool | Christine | François Leterrier | |
| 1981 | Le Maître d'école | Charlotte | Claude Berri | |
| 1982 | Ma femme s'appelle reviens | Mademoiselle Gauthier | Patrice Leconte | |
| 1982 | Les Sous-doués en vacances | Pétronille | Claude Zidi | |
| 1982 | Toro Moreno | | Gérard Krawczyk | Short |
| 1983 | Édith et Marcel | Ginou Richet | Claude Lelouch | |
| 1983 | My Other Husband | Cynthia | Georges Lautner | |
| 1983 | Signes extérieurs de richesse | Sylvie Picard | Jacques Monnet | |
| 1984 | Swann in Love | Madame de Cambremer | Volker Schlöndorff | |
| 1984 | Rive droite, rive gauche | Catherine | Philippe Labro | |
| 1984 | Retenez Moi...Ou Je Fais Un Malheur | Marie-Christine Martin | Michel Gérard | |
| 1987 | Sale destin | The prostitute | Sylvain Madigan | |
| 1988 | Chouans! | Olympe de Saint-Gildas | Philippe de Broca | |
| 1989 | La salle de bain | Brigitte | John Lvoff | |
| 1989 | À deux minutes près | Virginie | Éric Le Hung | |
| 1991 | My Father the Hero | Irina | Gérard Lauzier | |
| 1991 | Une époque formidable... | Rita | Gérard Jugnot | |
| 1991 | The Professional Secrets of Dr. Apfelgluck | The Spanish | Alessandro Capone, Thierry Lhermitte, ... | |
| 1993 | Une journée chez ma mère | Charlotte / Cathy | Dominique Cheminal | |
| 1995 | Jefferson in Paris | Marie Antoinette | James Ivory | |
| 1996 | The Proprietor | Judith Mark | Ismail Merchant | |
| 1997 | Héroïnes | Catherine | Gérard Krawczyk | |
| 1998 | Sea Devils | Mrs Ana Brown | Neil Hollander | |
| 1999 | Mon père, ma mère, mes frères et mes soeurs | Jeanne | Charlotte de Turckheim | |
| 2001 | Birds of Passage | Mrs. Charlotte Brown | Neil Hollander | |
| 2002 | Sexes très opposés | Brigitte | Éric Assous | |
| 2006 | Les Aristos | Countess Solange | Charlotte de Turckheim | |
| 2007 | New délire | Bobby's mother | Eric Le Roch | |
| 2010 | Pièce montée | Marie-Claire | Denys Granier-Deferre | |
| 2011 | La croisière | Hortense | Pascale Pouzadoux | |
| 2012 | Big Is Beautiful | Christelle | Charlotte de Turckheim | |
| 2013 | Grand départ | Madame Fauras | Nicolas Mercier | |
| 2014 | My Summer in Provence | Laurette | Roselyne Bosch | |
| 2015 | Qui c'est les plus forts? | Madame Galacher | Charlotte de Turckheim | |
| 2017 | Loue-moi ! | Michèle Masson | Coline Assous & Virginie Schwartz | |
| 2018 | Abdel et la Comtesse | Countess Louis de Montarbie d'Haust | Isabelle Doval | |
| 2021 | Big Is Beautiful 2 | Isabelle | Charlotte de Turckheim | |
| 2024 | Fêlés | Madame Larrieu | Christophe Duthuron | |

=== Television ===
| Year | Title | Role | Director | Notes |
|---|---|---|---|---|
| 1981 | Le boulanger de Suresnes | Josiane | Jean-Jacques Goron | TV movie |
| 1981 | Nana | Rose | Maurice Cazeneuve | TV mini-series |
| 1982 | Marcheloup | Georgette | Roger Pigaut | TV mini-series |
| 1983 | Secret diplomatique | Catherine Amélie | Denys de La Patellière & Claude Barrois | TV mini-series |
| 1988 | Carte de presse | Inspector Chaudagne | Michel Favart | TV movie |
| 1988 | Les rats de Montsouris | Hélène | Maurice Frydland | TV movie |
| 1988 | La baby-sitter | Julia Leguern | Chantal Baumann | TV series (1 episode) |
| 1990 | Deux maîtres à la maison | Carine | Agnès Delarive | TV movie |
| 1990 | Chillers | Lydia Savigny | Roger Andrieux & Mai Zetterling | TV series (1 episode) |
| 1995 | Parents à mi-temps | Alice | Alain Tasma | TV movie |
| 1997 | Le surdoué | Isabelle Leblanc | Alain Bonnot | TV movie |
| 1999 | Chassés-croisés | Alice | Caroline Huppert | TV movie |
| 2000–04 | Madame le proviseur | Alice Vandeleur | Sébastien Grall, Alain Bonnot, ... | TV series (10 episodes) |
| 2001 | Y a pas d'âge pour s'aimer | Christine | Thierry Chabert | TV movie |
| 2002 | Maresme | Martina | Rosa Vergés | TV movie |
| 2003 | Un été de canicule | Emma | Sébastien Grall | TV mini-series |
| 2005 | A Love to Hide | Marcelle Lavandier | Christian Faure | TV movie |
| 2006 | Times Have Been Better | Rosine | Régis Musset | TV movie |
| 2006 | Jeanne Poisson, Marquise de Pompadour | The Queen | Robin Davis | TV movie |
| 2008 | Une enfance volée: L'affaire Finaly | Antoinette Brun | Fabrice Genestal | TV movie |
| 2008 | Clara Sheller | Marie | Alain Berliner | TV series (4 episodes) |
| 2010 | Le grand ménage | Marie-Agnès | Régis Musset | TV movie |
| 2010–11 | La plus pire semaine de ma vie | Marguerite | Frédéric Auburtin | TV series (2 episodes) |
| 2012 | La loi de mon pays | Estelle Seban | Dominique Ladoge | TV movie |
| 2012 | Vive la colo ! | Capucine Kabik | Didier Le Pêcheur & Dominique Ladoge | TV series (6 episodes) |
| 2014 | Les tourtereaux divorcent | Liliane | Vincenzo Marano | TV movie |
| 2014 | Candice Renoir | Isaure de l'Estang | Olivier Laneurie | TV series (1 episode) |
| 2014 | Scènes de ménages | Cédric's Aunt | Francis Duquet | TV series (1 episode) |
| 2015 | Merci pour tout, Charles | Caroline Delacourt | Ernesto Oña | TV movie |
| 2016 | Murders at Dunkerque | Janie Roussel | Marwen Abdallah | TV movie |
| 2017 | La permission | Louise Perreau | Philippe Niang | TV movie |
| 2017 | The Law of Valérie | Valérie Renaut | Thierry Binisti | TV movie |
| 2019 | Murders at Belle-Île | Marine Lamblin | Marwen Abdallah | TV movie |
| 2020 | Disparition inquiétante | Prosecutor Hartmann | Arnauld Mercadier | TV series (1 episode) |
| 2022 | Détox | Mireille | Marie Jardillier | TV series (6 episodes) |
| 2024 | Ça, c'est Paris ! | Babeth Krebs | Marc Fitoussi | TV mini-series |

=== Screenwriter / Director ===
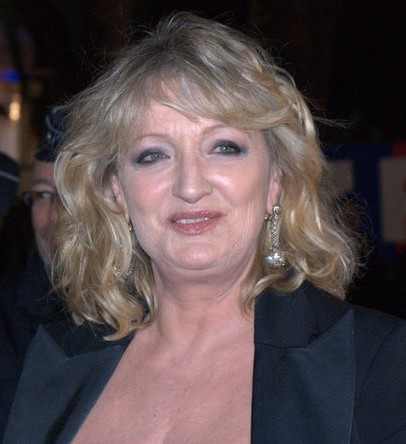
Charlotte de Turckheim in 2011

| Year | Title | Role |
|---|---|---|
| 1993 | Une journée chez ma mère | Writer |
| 1999 | Mon père, ma mère, mes frères et mes soeurs | Director & writer |
| 2006 | Les Aristos | Director & writer |
| 2012 | Big Is Beautiful | Director & writer |
| 2015 | Qui c'est les plus forts? | Director & writer |
| 2021 | Big Is Beautiful 2 | Director & writer |

== Theater ==
| Year | Title | Author | Director | Notes |
|---|---|---|---|---|
| 1978 | Le Bonbon magique | Jean-Noël Fenwick | Jean-Noël Fenwick | |
| 1980 | Le Troisième Jumeau | Jean-Paul Lilienfeld | Jean-Paul Lilienfeld | |
| 1981 | One Woman Show | Coluche | Coluche | One woman show |
| 1983 | Cyrano de Bergerac | Edmond Rostand | Jérôme Savary | |
| 1987 | Paliers de crabes | Hervé Hiolle & Charlotte de Turckheim | Alain Marcel | |
| 1989 | The Misanthrope | Molière | Jacques Weber | |
| 1990 | Une journée chez ma mère | Bruno Gaccio & Charlotte de Turckheim | Jacques Décombe | One woman show Nominated - Molière Award for Best One-Man Show |
| 1993 | Ma journée à moi | Bruno Gaccio & Charlotte de Turckheim | Jacques Décombe | One woman show |
| 2004 | On m'a pas prévenue | Bruno Gaccio & Charlotte de Turckheim | Valérie Benguigui & Catherine Hosmalin | One woman show |
| 2007 | Ça va nettement mieux | Charlotte de Turckheim | Catherine Hosmalin | One woman show |
| 2008 | Open Bed | David Serrano | Charlotte de Turckheim | |
| 2012 | Entertaining Mr Sloane | Joe Orton | Michel Fau | |
