= Raphaël Personnaz =

French actor

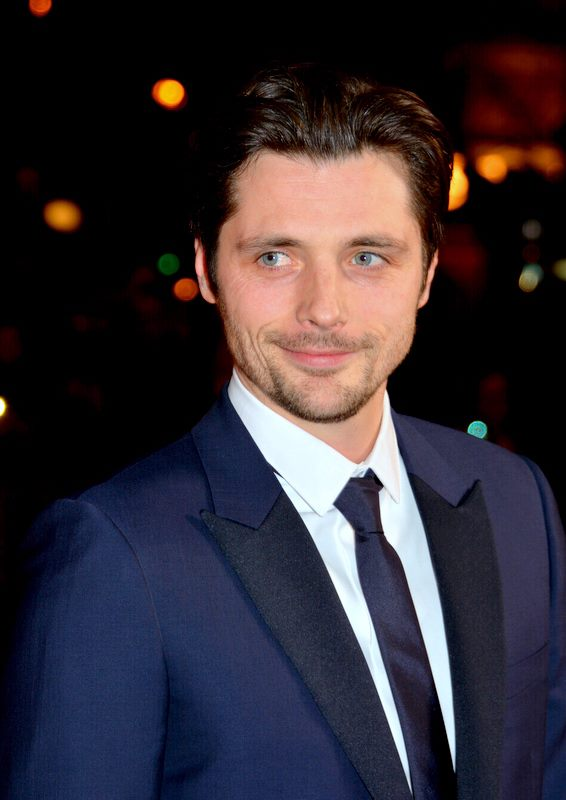
- Raphaël Personnaz at the 2016 César Awards
- Born: 1980 or 1981; Paris, France
- Occupation: Actor
- Years active: 1998–present

Raphaël Personnaz (French: [ʁafaɛl pɛʁsɔna]; born 1980 or 1981) is a French actor. He was awarded the Prix Patrick Dewaere in 2013.

== Personal life ==
Raphael Personnaz was born in 1980 or 1981 in the 13th arrondissement of Paris. His father was a furniture designer and his mother a translator of contemporary Greek poets. He began his career mainly in the theatre. He trained at the conservatory of the 20th arrondissement of Paris.

== Filmography ==
Year	Title	Role	Director	Notes
1998	Un homme en colère	Adrien	Caroline Huppert	TV series (1 episode)
2000	Un homme à la maison	Julien Bouttier	Michel Favart	TV movie
2000	Nestor Burma	Cédric Condorcet	Jacob Berger	TV series (1 episode)
2000	La kiné	Adrien	Daniel Vigne	TV series (1 episode)
2001	Malraux, tu m'étonnes!	Alain Malraux	Michèle Rosier	
2001	Le roman de Lulu	Christophe	Pierre-Olivier Scotto	
2001	Une femme amoureuse	Thomas	Jérôme Foulon	TV movie
2001	Sa mère, la pute		Brigitte Roüan	TV movie
2002	Mille millièmes	Denis	Rémi Waterhouse	
2002	Une maison dans la tempête	Louis	Christiane Lehérissey	TV movie
2002	Une autre femme	Julien	Jérôme Foulon	TV movie
2002	Louis la brocante	Guillaume Costelli	Michel Lang	TV series (1 episode)
2003	À la petite semaine	Jean-Hugues / Tony	Sam Karmann	
2003	Le fabuleux destin de Perrine Martin	The blind	Olivier Ciappa	Short
2003	Demain nous appartient	Marc	Patrick Poubel	TV movie
2003	La deuxième vérité	Mathias Lacroix	Philippe Monnier	TV movie
2003	Péril imminent	Laurent Ercourt	Christian Bonnet	TV movie
2004	The First Time I Turned Twenty	Louis	Lorraine Lévy	
2004	Nos vies rêvées	René	Fabrice Cazeneuve	TV movie
2004	Quand la mer se retire	Jacques	Laurent Heynemann	TV movie
2005	Il ne faut jurer... de rien!	Jean-Guillaume	Eric Civanyan	
2005	Travaux, on sait quand ça commence...	Fireman #1	Brigitte Roüan	
2005	È pericoloso sporgersi	Him	Avril Tembouret	Short
2005	Les couilles de mon chat	Jessie	Didier Bénureau	Short
2005	Esprit, es-tu là?	Damien	Edouard de Chabaneix	Short
2005	Merci, les enfants vont bien!	Jérôme	Stéphane Clavier	TV series (1 episode)
2005	Sauveur Giordano	Maxime Fiorez	Patrick Poubel	TV series (1 episode)
2006	Blame It on Fidel	Mathieu	Julie Gavras	
2006	Une virée	Paul	Raphaël Personnaz	Short
2006	Élodie Bradford	Arnaud	Régis Musset	TV series (1 episode)
2007	Le clan Pasquier	Joseph	Jean-Daniel Verhaeghe	TV mini-series
2007	Fargas	Arnoux	Didier Delaître	TV series (1 episode)
2008	La traductrice	Vincent	Elena Hazanov	
2008	Charlotte Corday	Camille Desmoulins	Henri Helman	TV movie
2009	Rose et noir	Obamo	Gérard Jugnot	
2009	Les incroyables aventures de Fusion Man	Dan / Fusion Man	Xavier Gens & Marius Vale	Short
2009	Ah, c'était ça la vie!	François	Franck Apprederis	TV mini-series
2009	Au siècle de Maupassant	Théodore de Sommervieux	Jean-Daniel Verhaeghe	TV series (1 episode)
2010	The Princess of Montpensier	Henry, Duke of Anjou	Bertrand Tavernier	Cabourg Film Festival - Swann d'Or - Male Revelation; Nominated - César Award for Most Promising Actor
2010	My Father's Guests	Carter	Anne Le Ny	
2010	George et Fanchette	Maurice	Jean-Daniel Verhaeghe	TV movie
2011	La Chance de ma vie	Martin Dupont	Nicolas Cuche	
2011	Forces spéciales	Elias	Stéphane Rybojad	
2012	Three Worlds	Al	Catherine Corsini	
2012	Anna Karenina	Count Alexander Vronsky	Joe Wright	
2013	The French Minister	Arthur Vlaminck	Bertrand Tavernier	Lumière Award for Best Male Revelation
2013	Marius	Marius	Daniel Auteuil	Lumière Award for Best Male Revelation
2013	Fanny	Marius	Daniel Auteuil	
2013	The Scapegoat	Benjamin Malaussène	Nicolas Bary	
2013	The Stroller Strategy	Thomas Platz	Clément Michel	
2013	After	Guillaume	Géraldine Maillet	
2013	Art or Love	Mark	Charis Orchard	
2014	The Gate	François Bizot	Régis Wargnier	
2014	The New Girlfriend	Gilles	François Ozon	
2015	SK1	Franck Magne / Charlie	Frédéric Tellier	
2016	In the Forests of Siberia	Teddy	Safy Nebbou	
2018	Croc-Blanc	Weedon Scott	Alexandre Espigares	
2019	Nicky Larson et le Parfum de Cupidon	Tony	Philippe Lacheau	
2019	The White Crow	Pierre Lacotte	Ralph Fiennes	
2020	Persona non grata		Roschdy Zem	
2021 - 2022	L'Opéra	Sebastien		TV Series (16 episodes)
2022	Nos frangins (Our Brothers)	Daniel Mattei	Rachid Bouchareb	
2022	Le tourbillon de la vie	Paul Sorel	Olivier Treiner	
2024	Boléro	Maurice Ravel	Anne Fontaine	
2025	The Richest Woman in the World	Jérôme Bonjean	Thierry Klifa	

== Theatre ==
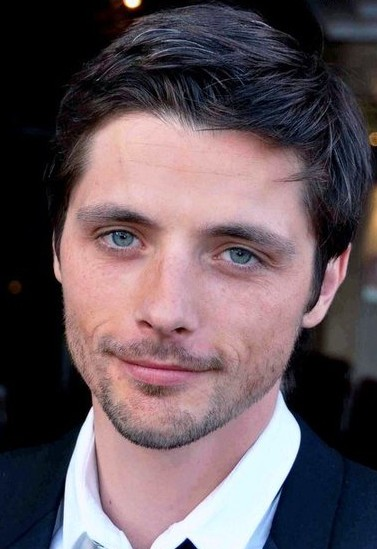
Raphaël Personnaz at the 2010 Cannes Film Festival

Year	Title	Author	Director	Notes
2007	Van Gogh à Londres	Richard Wright	Hélène Vincent	
2009	Médée	Jean Anouilh	Ladislas Chollat	
2014	House of Cards	Beau Willimon	Ladislas Chollat	
2017-2018	Scenes from a Marriage	Ingmar Bergman	Safy Nebbou	
2017-2019	Vous n'aurez pas ma haine	Antoine Leiris	Benjamin Guillard	Molière Award for Best One Man Show

== Awards ==
=== Wins ===
- 2013: Prix Patrick Dewaere
- 2014: Lumière Award for Best Male Revelation for The French Minister & Marius

=== Nominations ===
- 2011 Prix Patrick Dewaere
- 2011 César Awards for Most Promising Actor for The Princess of Montpensier
