= Éditions des Équateurs =

Maison anglaise

- Founded: 2003; 22 years ago
- Founder: Olivier Frébourg
- Country of origin: France
- Headquarters location: Normandy
- Publication types: Books,
- Official website: editionsdesequateurs.fr

The Éditions des Équateurs is a French publishing house founded by Olivier Frébourg in 2003.

Located in Normandy, it proposes a diversified catalog of works of fiction (novels, short stories, narratives) and documents (History, testimonies ...).

== Series ==
- Novels
- Short stories
- Équateurs parallèles
- Travels
- Narratives
- Essais
- Documents
- History.
- Art books
- Hors collection
- Inclassables.
