= César Award for Best Female Revelation =

Award

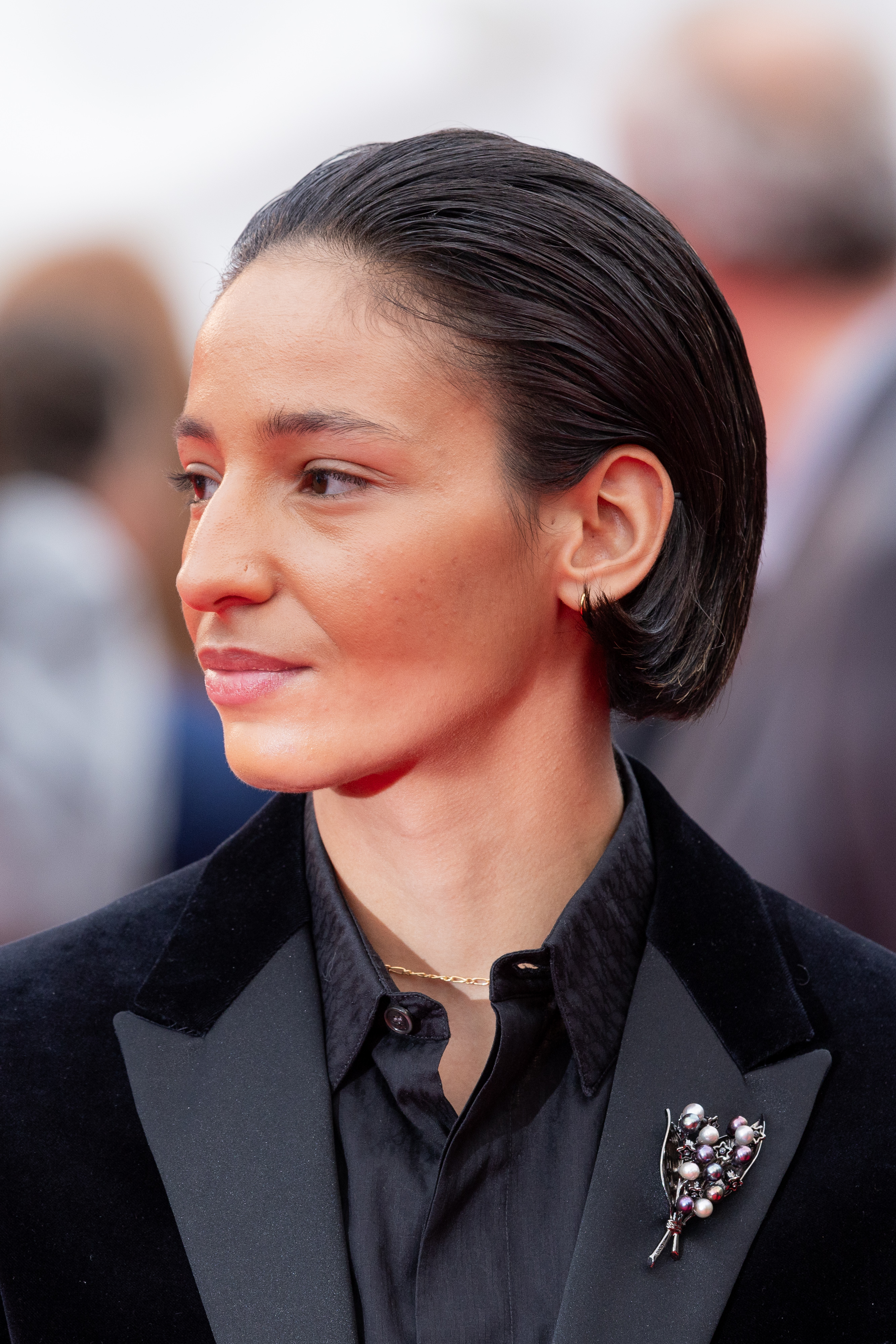
- 2026 recipient: Nadia Melliti
- Country: France
- Presented by: Académie des Arts et Techniques du Cinéma
- First award: 1983
- Currently held by: Nadia Melliti for The Little Sister (2026)
- Website: academie-cinema.org

The César Award for Best Female Revelation (French: César de la meilleure révélation féminine) is one of the César Awards, presented annually by the Académie des Arts et Techniques du Cinéma to recognize the outstanding breakthrough performance of a young actress who has worked within the French film industry during the year preceding the ceremony. Nominees and winner are selected via a run-off voting by all the members of the Académie, within a group of 16 actresses previously shortlisted by the Révélations Committee.

It was presented as the César du meilleur jeune espoir féminin from 1983 to 2004 and the César du meilleur espoir féminin from 2005 to 2023. In English, the award was variously referred to as Most Promising Actress or Best Female Newcomer.

== Winners and nominees ==
Following the AATC's practice, the films below are listed by year of ceremony, which corresponds to the year following the film's year of release. For example, the César du meilleur espoir féminin of 2010 was awarded on 27 February 2010 for a performance in a film released between 1 January 2009 and 31 December 2009.

As with the other César awards, actresses are selected via a two-round vote: first round to choose the nominees, second round to designate the winner. All the members of the Académie, without regard to their branch, are eligible to vote on both rounds. But in order to "facilitate" the nomination vote, the Révélations Committee of the Académie, consisting of casting directors, establishes and proposes a list of a maximum of 16 actresses. However, this list is non-binding and Académie members are free to vote for an actress who has not been shortlisted. Initially set to four, the number of nominees was expanded to five in 1990.

Winners are listed first in bold, followed by the other nominees.

=== 1980s ===
Year	Winner and nominees	English title	Original title
1983 (8th)	**Sophie Marceau**	**La Boum 2**	
1983 (8th)	Souad Amidou	Le Grand Frère	
1983 (8th)	Fabienne Guyon	Une chambre en ville	
1983 (8th)	Julie Jézéquel	L'Étoile du Nord	
1984 (9th)	**Sandrine Bonnaire**	**À nos amours**	
1984 (9th)	Elizabeth Bourgine	Vive la sociale!	
1984 (9th)	Laure Duthilleul	Le Destin de Juliette	
1984 (9th)	Agnès Soral	So Long, Stooge	Tchao Pantin
1985 (10th)	**Laure Marsac**	**The Pirate**	**La Pirate**
1985 (10th)	Fanny Bastien	Pinot simple flic	
1985 (10th)	Emmanuelle Béart	Un amour interdit	
1985 (10th)	Sophie Duez	Marche à l'ombre	
1986 (11th)	**Charlotte Gainsbourg**	**An Impudent Girl**	**L'Effrontée**
1986 (11th)	Emmanuelle Béart	L'Amour en douce	
1986 (11th)	Philippine Leroy-Beaulieu	Three Men and a Cradle	Trois hommes et un couffin
1986 (11th)	Charlotte Valandrey	Red Kiss	Rouge Baiser
1986 (11th)	Zabou Breitman	Billy Ze Kick	
1987 (12th)	**Catherine Mouchet**	**Thérèse**	
1987 (12th)	Dominique Blanc	The Woman of My Life	La Femme de ma vie
1987 (12th)	Julie Delpy	The Night Is Young	Mauvais Sang
1987 (12th)	Marianne Basler	Rosa la rose, fille publique	
1988 (13th)	**Mathilda May**	**The Cry of the Owl**	**Le Cri du hibou**
1988 (13th)	Anne Brochet	Masks	Masques
1988 (13th)	Julie Delpy	Beatrice	La Passion Béatrice
1988 (13th)	Sophie Renoir	Boyfriends and Girlfriends	L'Ami de mon amie
1989 (14th)	**Catherine Jacob**	**Life Is a Long Quiet River**	**La Vie est un long fleuve tranquille**
1989 (14th)	Nathalie Cardone	A Strange Place to Meet	Drôle d'endroit pour une rencontre
1989 (14th)	Clotilde de Bayser	L'Enfance de l'art	
1989 (14th)	Ingrid Held	La Maison assassinées	

=== 1990s ===
Year	Winner and nominees	English title	Original title
1990 (15th)	**Vanessa Paradis**	**Noce Blanche**	
1990 (15th)	Dominique Blanc	I'm the King of the Castle	Je suis le seigneur du château
1990 (15th)	Isabelle Gélinas	Suivez cet avion	
1990 (15th)	Mireille Perrier	Love Without Pity	Un monde sans pitié
1990 (15th)	Valérie Stroh	Baptême	
1991 (16th)	**Judith Henry**	**La Discrète**	
1991 (16th)	Clotilde Courau	The Little Gangster	Le Petit Criminel
1991 (16th)	Florence Darel	Uranus	
1991 (16th)	Judith Godrèche	La Désenchantée	
1991 (16th)	Isabelle Nanty	Tatie Danielle	
1992 (17th)	**Géraldine Pailhas**	**La Neige et le Feu**	
1992 (17th)	Marie-Laure Dougnac	Delicatessen	
1992 (17th)	Marie Gillain	My Father the Hero	Mon père, ce héros
1992 (17th)	Alexandra London	Van Gogh	
1992 (17th)	Elsa Zylberstein	Van Gogh	
1993 (18th)	**Romane Bohringer**	**Savage Nights**	**Les Nuits fauves**
1993 (18th)	Isabelle Carré	Beau fixe	
1993 (18th)	Charlotte Kadi	L.627	
1993 (18th)	Linh Dan Pham	Indochine	
1993 (18th)	Elsa Zylberstein	Beau fixe	
1994 (19th)	**Valeria Bruni Tedeschi**	**Normal People Are Nothing Exceptional**	**Les Gens normaux n'ont rien d'exceptionnel**
1994 (19th)	Virginie Ledoyen	Les Marmottes	
1994 (19th)	Chiara Mastroianni	My Favorite Season	Ma saison préférée
1994 (19th)	Florence Pernel	Three Colors: Blue	Trois Couleurs : Bleu
1994 (19th)	Karin Viard	Sidestroke	La Nage indienne
1995 (20th)	**Élodie Bouchez**	**Wild Reeds**	**Les Roseaux sauvages**
1995 (20th)	Marie Bunel	Couples et amants	
1995 (20th)	Sandrine Kiberlain	The Patriots	Les Patriotes
1995 (20th)	Virginie Ledoyen	Cold Water	L'Eau froide
1995 (20th)	Elsa Zylberstein	Mina Tannenbaum	
1996 (21st)	**Sandrine Kiberlain**	**To Have (or Not)**	**En avoir (ou pas)**
1996 (21st)	Isabelle Carré	The Horseman on the Roof	Le Hussard sur le toit
1996 (21st)	Clotilde Courau	Élisa	
1996 (21st)	Marie Gillain	The Bait	L'Appât
1996 (21st)	Virginie Ledoyen	A Single Girl	La Fille seule
1997 (22nd)	**Laurence Côte**	**Thieves**	**Les Voleurs**
1997 (22nd)	Jeanne Balibar	My Sex Life... or How I Got Into an Argument	Comment je me suis disputé... (ma vie sexuelle)
1997 (22nd)	Emmanuelle Devos	My Sex Life... or How I Got Into an Argument	Comment je me suis disputé... (ma vie sexuelle)
1997 (22nd)	Monica Bellucci	The Apartment	L'Appartement
1997 (22nd)	Garance Clavel	When the Cat's Away	Chacun cherche son chat
1998 (23rd)	**Emma de Caunes**	**Un frère**	
1998 (23rd)	Jeanne Balibar	I Hate Love	J'ai horreur de l'amour
1998 (23rd)	Isabelle Carré	The Banned Woman	La Femme défendue
1998 (23rd)	Amira Casar	La Vérité si je mens !	
1998 (23rd)	Laetitia Pesenti	Marius and Jeannette	Marius et Jeannette
1999 (24th)	**Natacha Régnier**	**The Dreamlife of Angels**	**La Vie rêvée des anges**
1999 (24th)	Marion Cotillard	Taxi	
1999 (24th)	Hélène de Fougerolles	Let There Be Light	Que la lumière soit !
1999 (24th)	Sophie Guillemin	L'Ennui	
1999 (24th)	Rona Hartner	Gadjo Dilo	

=== 2000s ===
Year	Winner and nominees	English title	Original title
2000 (25th)	**Audrey Tautou**	**Venus Beauty Institute**	**Vénus Beauté (Institut)**
2000 (25th)	Sylvie Testud	Karnaval	
2000 (25th)	Barbara Schulz	The Dilettante	La Dilettante
2000 (25th)	Valentina Cervi	Rien sur Robert	
2000 (25th)	Émilie Dequenne	Rosetta	
2001 (26th)	**Sylvie Testud**	**Murderous Maids**	**Les Blessures assassines**
2001 (26th)	Bérénice Bejo	Most Promising Young Actress	Meilleur Espoir féminin
2001 (26th)	Sophie Guillemin	Harry, He's Here to Help	Harry, un ami qui vous veut du bien
2001 (26th)	Isild Le Besco	Sade	
2001 (26th)	Julie-Marie Parmentier	Murderous Maids	Les Blessures assassines
2002 (27th)	**Rachida Brakni**	**Chaos**	
2002 (27th)	Marion Cotillard	Pretty Things	Les Jolies Choses
2002 (27th)	Hélène Fillières	A Hell of a Day	Reines d'un jour
2002 (27th)	Hélène de Fougerolles	Who Knows?	Va savoir
2002 (27th)	Isild Le Besco	Roberto Succo	
2003 (28th)	**Cécile de France**	**The Spanish Apartement**	**L'Auberge espagnole**
2003 (28th)	Émilie Dequenne	A Housekeeper	Une femme de ménage
2003 (28th)	Mélanie Doutey	The Warrior's Brother	Le Frère du guerrier
2003 (28th)	Marina Foïs	Hypnotized and Hysterical	Filles perdues, cheveux gras
2003 (28th)	Ludivine Sagnier	8 Women	8 femmes
2004 (29th)	**Julie Depardieu**	**Little Lili**	**La Petite Lili**
2004 (29th)	Marie-Josée Croze	The Barbarian Invasions	Les Invasions barbares
2004 (29th)	Dinara Drukarova	Since Otar Left	Depuis qu'Otar est parti...
2004 (29th)	Laura Smet	Eager Bodies	Les Corps impatients
2004 (29th)	Sophie Quinton	Who Killed Bambi?	Qui a tué Bambi?
2005 (30th)	**Sara Forestier**	**Games of Love and Chance**	**L'Esquive**
2005 (30th)	Marilou Berry	Look at Me	Comme une image
2005 (30th)	Lola Naymark	A Common Thread	Brodeuses
2005 (30th)	Sabrina Ouazani	Games of Love and Chance	L'Esquive
2005 (30th)	Magali Woch	Kings and Queen	Rois et Reine
2006 (31st)	**Linh Dan Pham**	**The Beat That My Heart Skipped**	**De battre mon cœur s'est arrêté**
2006 (31st)	Mélanie Doutey	Il ne faut jurer de rien!	
2006 (31st)	Déborah François	The Child	L'Enfant
2006 (31st)	Marina Hands	Grey Souls	Les Âmes grises
2006 (31st)	Fanny Valette	Little Jerusalem	La Petite Jérusalem
2007 (32nd)	**Mélanie Laurent**	**I'm Fine, Don't Worry**	**Je vais bien, ne t'en fais pas**
2007 (32nd)	Déborah François	The Page Turner	La Tourneuse de pages
2007 (32nd)	Marina Hands	Lady Chatterley	
2007 (32nd)	Maïwenn Le Besco	Forgive Me	Pardonnez-moi
2007 (32nd)	Aïssa Maïga	Bamako	
2008 (33rd)	**Hafsia Herzi**	**The Secret of the Grain**	**La Graine et le Mulet**
2008 (33rd)	Louise Blachère	Water Lilies	Naissance des pieuvres
2008 (33rd)	Adèle Haenel	Water Lilies	Naissance des pieuvres
2008 (33rd)	Audrey Dana	Crossed Tracks	Roman de gare
2008 (33rd)	Clotilde Hesme	Love Songs	Les Chansons d'amour
2009 (34th)	**Déborah François**	**The First Day of the Rest of Your Life**	**Le Premier Jour du reste de ta vie**
2009 (34th)	Marilou Berry	Ugly Melanie	Vilaine
2009 (34th)	Louise Bourgoin	The Girl from Monaco	La Fille de Monaco
2009 (34th)	Anaïs Demoustier	Les Grandes Personnes	
2009 (34th)	Léa Seydoux	The Beautiful Person	La Belle Personne

=== 2010s ===
Year	Winner and nominees	English title	Original title
2010 (35th)	**Mélanie Thierry**	**One for the Road**	**Le Dernier pour la route**
2010 (35th)	Pauline Étienne	Silent Voice	Qu'un seul tienne et les autres suivront
2010 (35th)	Florence Loiret-Caille	Je l'aimais	
2010 (35th)	Soko	In the Beginning	À l'origine
2010 (35th)	Christa Theret	LOL (Laughing Out Loud)	
2011 (36th)	**Leïla Bekhti**	**Tout ce qui brille**	
2011 (36th)	Anaïs Demoustier	Living on Love Alone	D'amour et d'eau fraîche
2011 (36th)	Audrey Lamy	Tout ce qui brille	
2011 (36th)	Léa Seydoux	Belle Épine	
2011 (36th)	Yahima Torres	Black Venus	Vénus noire
2012 (37th)	**Naidra Ayadi**	**Polisse**	
2012 (37th)	**Clotilde Hesme**	**Angel & Tony**	**Angèle et Tony**
2012 (37th)	Adèle Haenel	House of Tolerance	L'Apollonide: Souvenirs de la maison close
2012 (37th)	Céline Sallette	House of Tolerance	L'Apollonide: Souvenirs de la maison close
2012 (37th)	Christa Theret	Twiggy	La Brindille
2013 (38th)	**Izïa Higelin**	**Bad Girl**	**Mauvaise fille**
2013 (38th)	Alice de Lencquesaing	In a Rush	Au galop
2013 (38th)	Lola Dewaere	Mince alors!	
2013 (38th)	Julia Faure	Camille Rewinds	Camille redouble
2013 (38th)	India Hair	Camille Rewinds	Camille redouble
2014 (39th)	**Adèle Exarchopoulos**	**Blue Is the Warmest Colour**	**La Vie d'Adèle – Chapitres 1 & 2**
2014 (39th)	Lou de Laâge	Jappeloup	
2014 (39th)	Pauline Étienne	The Nun	La Religieuse
2014 (39th)	Golshifteh Farahani	The Patience Stone	سنگ صبور
2014 (39th)	Marine Vacth	Young & Beautiful	Jeune & Jolie
2015 (40th)	**Louane Emera**	**The Bélier Family**	**La Famille Bélier**
2015 (40th)	Lou de Laâge	Respire	
2015 (40th)	Joséphine Japy	Respire	
2015 (40th)	Ariane Labed	Fidelio: Alice's Odyssey	Fidelio, l'odyssée d'Alice
2015 (40th)	Karidja Touré	Girlhood	Bande de filles
2016 (41st)	**Zita Hanrot**	**Fatima**	
2016 (41st)	Lou Roy-Lecollinet	My Golden Days	Trois souvenirs de ma jeunesse
2016 (41st)	Diane Rouxel	Standing Tall	La Tête haute
2016 (41st)	Sara Giraudeau	Les Bêtises	
2016 (41st)	Camille Cottin	The Parisian Bitch, Princess of Hearts	Connasse, Princesse des cœurs
2017 (42nd)	**Oulaya Amamra**	**Divines**	
2017 (42nd)	Paula Beer	Frantz	
2017 (42nd)	Lily-Rose Depp	The Dancer	La Danseuse
2017 (42nd)	Noémie Merlant	Heaven Will Wait	Le Ciel attendra
2017 (42nd)	Raph	Slack Bay	Ma Loute
2018 (43rd)	**Camélia Jordana**	**Le Brio**	
2018 (43rd)	Iris Bry	The Guardians	Les gardiennes
2018 (43rd)	Laetitia Dosch	Montparnasse Bienvenue	Jeune Femme
2018 (43rd)	Eye Haïdara	C'est la vie!	Le Sens de la fête
2018 (43rd)	Garance Marillier	Raw	Grave
2019 (44th)	**Kenza Fortas**	**Shéhérazade**	
2019 (44th)	Ophélie Bau	Mektoub, My Love: Canto Uno	
2019 (44th)	Galatea Bellugi	The Apparition	L'Apparition
2019 (44th)	Jehnny Beth	An Impossible Love	Un amour impossible
2019 (44th)	Lily-Rose Depp	A Faithful Man	L'Homme fidèle

=== 2020s ===
Year	Winner and nominees	English title	Original title
2020 (45th)	**Lyna Khoudri**	**Papicha**	
2020 (45th)	Luàna Bajrami	Portrait of a Lady on Fire	Portrait de la jeune fille en feu
2020 (45th)	Céleste Brunnquell	The Dazzled	Les éblouis
2020 (45th)	Nina Meurisse	Camille	
2020 (45th)	Mame Bineta Sane	Atlantics	Atlantique
2021 (46th)	**Fathia Youssouf**	**Cuties**	**Mignonnes**
2021 (46th)	India Hair	Poissonsexe	
2021 (46th)	Julia Piaton	Love Affair(s)	Les Choses qu'on dit, les choses qu'on fait
2021 (46th)	Camille Rutherford	Felicità	
2021 (46th)	Mélissa Guers	The Girl with a Bracelet	La Fille au bracelet
2022 (47th)	**Anamaria Vartolomei**	**Happening**	**L'événement**
2022 (47th)	Noée Abita	Slalom	
2022 (47th)	Salomé Dewaels	Lost Illusions	Illusions perdues
2022 (47th)	Agathe Rousselle	Titane	
2022 (47th)	Lucie Zhang	Paris, 13th District	Les Olympiades
2023 (48th)	**Nadia Tereszkiewicz**	**Forever Young**	**Les Amandiers**
2023 (48th)	Marion Barbeau	Rise	En corps
2023 (48th)	Guslagie Malanda	Saint Omer	
2023 (48th)	Rebecca Marder	A Radiant Girl	Une jeune fille qui va bien
2023 (48th)	Mallory Wanecque	The Worst Ones	Les Pires
2024 (49th)	**Ella Rumpf**	**Marguerite's Theorem**	**Le Théorème de Marguerite**
2024 (49th)	Céleste Brunnquell	No Love Lost	La fille de son père
2024 (49th)	Kim Higelin	Consent	Le Consentement
2024 (49th)	Suzanne Jouannet	The Path of Excellence	La voie royale
2024 (49th)	Rebecca Marder	Grand Expectations	De grandes espérances
2025 (50th)	**Maïwene Barthelemy**	**Holy Cow**	**Vingt Dieux**
2025 (50th)	Malou Khebizi	Wild Diamond	Diamant brut
2025 (50th)	Megan Northam	Rabia	
2025 (50th)	Mallory Wanecque	Beating Hearts	L'Amour ouf
2025 (50th)	Souheila Yacoub	Planet B	
2026 (51st)	**Nadia Melliti**	**The Little Sister**	**La Petite Dernière**
2026 (51st)	Manon Clavel	Kika	
2026 (51st)	Suzanne Lindon	Colours of Time	La Venue de l'avenir
2026 (51st)	Camille Rutherford	Jane Austen Wrecked My Life	Jane Austen a gâché ma vie
2026 (51st)	Anja Verderosa	Hearts on Fire	L'épreuve du feu

== Révélations ==
Each year, the Academy's Governing Board and the Révélations Committee (made up of casting directors working in French film productions) propose a list of a maximum of 16 young actresses ("Révélations des César") to facilitate the voting for the "Most Promising Actress" award. Since 2007, all young actresses who have worked on French feature-length films or primarily French-language productions are eligible for the list. However, beginning from 2013, an actress cannot qualify for the list more than twice. The "Révélations" are also featured in a short film directed by an artist appointed by the Academy yearly. The short film, unveiled at a gala dinner which is organised in honour of the "Révélations", is also later screened at select cinemas in France.

Nominees of the César Award for Most Promising Actress are highlighted in boldface.

=== 2000s ===
==== 2007 ====
- Morjana Alaoui – Marock
- Leïla Bekhti – Bad Faith (Mauvaise Foi)
- Lizzie Brochere – One to Another (Chacun sa nuit)
- Sophie Cattani – Charlie Says (Selon Charlie)
- Maroussia Dubreuil – The Exterminating Angels (Les Anges exterminateurs)
- **Déborah François – The Page Turner** (**La Tourneuse de pages**)
- **Marina Hands – Lady Chatterley**
- Hande Kodja – Murderers (**Meurtrières**)
- **Mélanie Laurent – Don't Worry, I'm Fine** (**Je vais bien ne t'en fais pas**)
- Adélaïde Leroux – Flanders (Flandres)
- **Aïssa Maiga – Bamako**
- **Maïwenn – Pardonnez-moi**
- Joséphine de Meaux – Those Happy Days (Nos jours heureux)
- Clémence Poésy – Le Grand Meaulnes
- Sophie Quinton – April in Love (Avril)
- Céline Sallette – Murderers (Meurtrières)

==== 2008 ====
- **Louise Blachère – Water Lilies** (**Naissance des pieuvres**)
- Chloé Coulloud – La Tête de maman
- **Audrey Dana – Roman de Gare**
- Judith Davis – Jacquou le Croquant
- Anaïs Demoustier – L'Année suivante
- Émilie de Preissac – Regarde-moi
- **Adèle Haenel – Water Lilies** (**Naissance des pieuvres**)
- **Hafsia Herzi – The Secret of the Grain** (**La Graine et le Mulet**)
- **Clotilde Hesme – Love Songs** (**Les Chansons d'amour**)
- Yeelem Jappain – Those Who Remain (Ceux qui restent)
- Marie Kremer – Beneath the Rooftops of Paris (Les Toits de Paris)
- Clémence Poésy – Sans moi
- Constance Rousseau – All Is Forgiven (Tout est pardonné)
- Stéphanie Sokolinski – On the Ropes (Dans les cordes)
- Louise Szpindel – On the Ropes (Dans les cordes)
- Christa Theret – Et toi, t'es sur qui?

==== 2009 ====
- Nora Arnezeder – Paris 36 (Faubourg 36)
- Leïla Bekhti – Dolls and Angels (Des poupées et des anges)
- Mélanie Bernier – Passe-passe
- **Marilou Berry – Vilaine**
- Olympe Borval – Le Chant des mariées
- **Louise Bourgoin – The Girl from Monaco** (**La Fille de Monaco**)
- Lizzie Brocheré – Le Chant des mariées
- Judith Chemla – Versailles
- **Anaïs Demoustier – Les Grandes Personnes**
- **Déborah François – The First Day of the Rest of Your Life** (**Le premier jour du reste de ta vie**)
- Juliette Lamboley – Daddy Cool (15 ans et demi)
- Adélaïde Leroux – Home
- Clémentine Poidatz – Frontier of the Dawn (La Frontière de l'aube)
- **Léa Seydoux – The Beautiful Person** (**La Belle Personne**)
- Salomé Stévenin – Like a Star Shining in the Night (Comme une étoile dans la nuit)
- Fanny Valette – Welcome Home (Sur ta joue ennemie)

=== 2010s ===
==== 2010 ====
- Marie-Julie Baup – Micmacs (Micmacs à tire-larigot)
- Astrid Berges Frisbey – The Sea Wall (Un barrage contre le Pacifique)
- Agathe Bonitzer – Un chat un chat
- Sophie Cattani – I'm Glad My Mother Is Alive (Je suis heureux que ma mère soit vivante)
- Judith Davis – You Will Be Mine (Je te mangerais)
- Anaïs Demoustier – Sois sage
- Mati Diop – 35 Shots of Rum (35 rhums)
- **Pauline Etienne – Silent Voice** (**Qu'un seul tienne et les autres suivront**)
- Alice de Lencquesaing – Father of My Children (Le Père de mes enfants)
- **Florence Loiret-Caille – Je l'aimais**
- Sara Martins – Mensch
- Lola Naymark – The Army of Crime (L'Armée du crime)
- Vimala Pons – Bitter Victory (La Sainte Victoire)
- **Soko – In the Beginning** (**À l'origine**)
- **Christa Theret – LOL (Laughing Out Loud)**
- **Mélanie Thierry – One for the Road** (**Le Dernier pour la route**)

==== 2011 ====
- Raphaëlle Agogué – The Round Up (La Rafle)
- Clara Augarde – Love Like Poison (Un poison violent)
- **Leïla Bekhti – Tout ce qui brille**
- Judith Chemla – Beautiful Lies (De vrais mensonges)
- Vanessa David – Sweet Valentine
- **Anaïs Demoustier – Living on Love Alone** (**D'amour et d'eau fraîche**)
- Adèle Exarchopoulos – Turk's Head (Tête de turc)
- Ana Girardot – Lights Out (Simon Werner a disparu...)
- Annabelle Hettmann – The Sentiment of the Flesh (Le Sentiment de la chair)
- **Audrey Lamy – Tout ce qui brille**
- Elise Lhomeau – Young Girls in Black (Des filles en noir)
- Nina Meurisse – Accomplices (Complices)
- Veronika Novak – My Father's Guests
- Agathe Schlencker – Belle Épine
- **Léa Seydoux – Belle Épine**
- **Yahima Torres – Black Venus** (**Vénus noire**)

==== 2012 ====
- **Naidra Ayadi – Polisse**
- Anne Azoulay – Léa
- Alice Barnole – House of Tolerance (L'Apollonide : Souvenirs de la maison close)
- Astrid Bergès-Frisbey – The Well-Digger's Daughter (La Fille du puisatier)
- Lola Créton – Goodbye First Love (Un amour de jeunesse)
- Marie Denarnaud – The Adopted (Les Adoptés)
- Amandine Dewasmes – All Our Desires (Toutes nos envies)
- Golshifteh Farahani – Si tu meurs, je te tue
- **Adèle Haenel – House of Tolerance** (**L'Apollonide : Souvenirs de la maison close**)
- **Clotilde Hesme – Angel & Tony** (**Angèle et Tony**)
- Joséphine Japy – The Monk (Le Moine)
- **Céline Sallette – House of Tolerance** (**L'Apollonide : Souvenirs de la maison close**)
- **Christa Théret – Twiggy** (**La Brindille**)
- Alison Wheeler – Mon père est femme de ménage
- Iliana Zabeth – House of Tolerance (L'Apollonide : Souvenirs de la maison close)

==== 2013 ====
- Laurence Arné – Bowling
- Alice Belaïdi – Porn in the Hood (Les Kaïra)
- Agathe Bonitzer – A Bottle in the Gaza Sea (Une bouteille à la mer)
- Lola Créton – Something in the Air (Après mai)
- **Alice de Lencquesaing – Au galop**
- **Lola Dewaere – Mince alors!**
- Arta Dobroshi – Three Worlds (Trois mondes)
- **Julia Faure – Camille Rewinds** (**Camille redouble**)
- **India Hair – Camille Rewinds** (**Camille redouble**)
- **Izïa Higelin – Bad Girl** (**Mauvaise Fille**)
- Sarah Le Picard – Alyah
- Sofiia Manousha – Le noir (te) vous va si bien
- Noémie Merlant – L'Orpheline avec en plus un bras en moins
- Alice Pol – A Perfect Plan (Un plan parfait)
- Clara Ponsot – Bye Bye Blondie
- Camille Rutherford – Low Life

==== 2014 ====
- Margot Bancilhon – Les Petits Princes
- Flore Bonaventura – Chinese Puzzle (Casse-tête chinois)
- Pauline Burlet – The Past (Le Passé)
- **Lou de Laâge – Jappeloup**
- Laetitia Dosch – Age of Panic (La Bataille de Solférino)
- **Pauline Etienne – The Nun** (**La Religieuse**)
- **Adèle Exarchopoulos – Blue Is the Warmest Colour** (**La Vie d'Adèle – Chapitres 1 & 2**)
- **Golshifteh Farahani – The Patience Stone** (**Syngué sabour. Pierre de patience**)
- Esther Garrel – Youth (Jeunesse)
- Ariane Labed – A Place on Earth (Une place sur la terre)
- Charlotte Le Bon – The Marchers (La Marche)
- Chloé Lecerf – Vandal
- Anamaria Marinca – Un nuage dans un verre d'eau
- Pauline Parigot – Les Lendemains
- Vimala Pons – La Fille du 14 juillet
- **Marine Vacth – Young & Beautiful** (**Jeune & jolie**)

==== 2015 ====
- Soumaye Bocoum – Papa Was Not a Rolling Stone
- Armande Boulanger – La Pièce manquante
- Lolita Chammah – Gaby Baby Doll
- **Lou de Laâge – Respire**
- **Louane Emera – La Famille Bélier**
- Alice Isaaz – La Crème de la crème
- **Joséphine Japy – Respire**
- **Ariane Labed – Fidelio, Alice's Odyssey** (**Fidelio, l'odyssée d'Alice**)
- Sofia Lesaffre – Les Trois Frères : Le Retour
- Mélodie Richard – Métamorphoses
- Solène Rigot – Tonnerre
- Ariana Rivoire – Marie's Story (Marie Heurtin)
- Anna Sigalevitch – Loup-Garou
- Philippine Stindel – Mercuriales
- Assa Sylla – Girlhood (Bande de filles)
- **Karidja Touré – Girlhood** (**Bande de filles**)

==== 2016 ====
- Mathilde Bisson – Au plus près du Soleil
- **Camille Cottin** – **Connasse, Princesse des cœurs**
- Lucie Debay – Melody
- **Sara Giraudeau** – **Les Bêtises**
- **Zita Hanrot** – **Fatima**
- Stacy Martin – Taj Mahal
- Freya Mavor – The Lady in the Car with Glasses and a Gun (La Dame dans l'auto avec des lunettes et un fusil)
- Baya Medhaffar – As I Open My Eyes (À peine j'ouvre les yeux)
- Lena Paugam – In the Shadow of Women (L'Ombre des femmes)
- **Diane Rouxel** – **Standing Tall** (**La Tête haute**)
- **Lou Roy-Lecollinet** – **My Golden Days** (**Trois souvenirs de ma jeunesse**)
- Georgia Scalliet – L'Odeur de la mandarine
- Noémie Schmidt – The Student and Mister Henri (L'Étudiante et Monsieur Henri)
- Pauline Serieys – Une famille à louer
- Sarah Suco – Discount
- Lily Taieb – My Golden Days (Trois souvenirs de ma jeunesse)
- Sophie Verbeeck – All About Them (À trois on y va)

==== 2017 ====
- **Oulaya Amamra – Divines**
- Naomi Amarger – Heaven Will Wait (Le Ciel attendra)
- **Paula Beer – Frantz**
- Galatea Bellugi – Keeper
- Sigrid Bouaziz – Personal Shopper
- **Lily-Rose Depp** – **The Dancer** (**La Danseuse**)
- Eye Haïdara – Jailbirds (La Taularde)
- Liv Henneguier – Crache cœur
- Manal Issa – Parisienne (Peur de rien)
- Annabelle Lengronne – La Fine Équipe
- Marilyn Lima – Bang Gang (A Modern Love Story) (Bang Gang (une histoire d'amour moderne))
- **Noémie Merlant** – **Heaven Will Wait** (**Le Ciel attendra**)
- **Raph** – **Slack Bay** (**Ma Loute**)
- Salomé Richard – Baden Baden
- Ginger Romàn – The Stopover (Voir du pays)
- Julia Roy – Never Ever (À jamais)
- Anastasia Shevtsova – Polina (Polina, danser sa vie)

==== 2018 ====
- Noée Abita – Ava
- Sveva Alviti – Dalida
- **Iris Bry – The Guardians (Les Gardiennes)**
- Louise Chevillotte – Lover for a Day (L'Amant d'un jour)
- Adeline d'Hermy – Maryline
- **Laetitia Dosch – Montparnasse Bienvenue (Jeune Femme)**
- Lina El Arabi – A Wedding (Noces)
- Esther Garrel – Lover for a Day (L'Amant d'un jour)
- Ana Girardot – Back to Burgundy (Ce qui nous lie)
- **Eye Haïdara – C'est la vie! (Le Sens de la fête)**
- Alice Isaaz – Endangered Species
- **Camélia Jordana – Le Brio**
- Lyna Khoudri – Les Bienheureux
- **Garance Marillier – Raw (Grave)**
- Daphné Patakia – Djam
- Paméla Ramos - Tous les rêves du monde
- Solène Rigot – Orphan (Orpheline)
- Ella Rumpf – Raw (Grave)

== See also ==
- Lumière Award for Best Female Revelation
- Magritte Award for Most Promising Actress
