= 36th César Awards =

Annual film awards

- Official poster featuring a photo of the late German actress Romy Schneider
- Date: 25 February 2011
- Site: Théâtre du Châtelet, Paris, France
- Hosted by: Antoine de Caunes

Highlights
- Best Picture: Of Gods and Men
- Best Director: Roman Polanski
- Best Actor: Éric Elmosnino
- Best Actress: Sara Forestier
- Most awards: The Ghost Writer (4)
- Most nominations: Of Gods and Men (11)

Television coverage
- Network: Canal Plus

The 36th César Awards ceremony was presented by the Académie des Arts et Techniques du Cinéma in Paris, France, to honour its selection of the best French films of 2010 on 25 February 2011. The ceremony was chaired by Jodie Foster and hosted by Antoine de Caunes. The audience gave a standing ovation to Olivia de Havilland, their "special honored guest".

== Winners and nominees ==
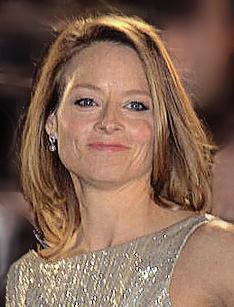
Jodie Foster, President of the Ceremony

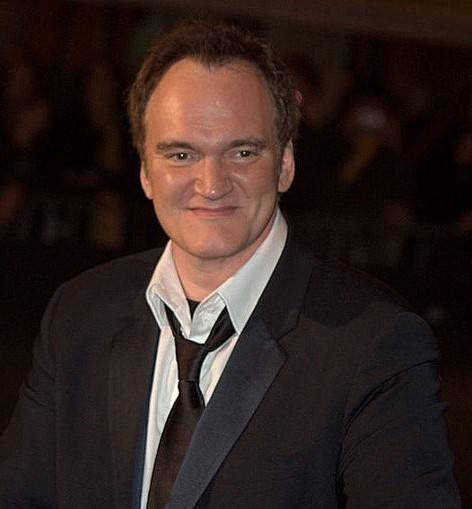
Quentin Tarantino, Honorary César recipient

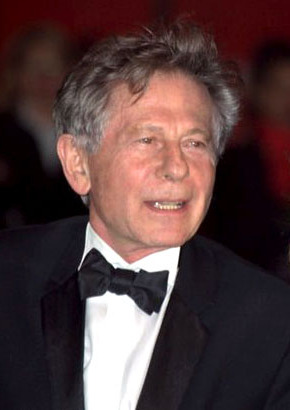
Roman Polanski, Best Director winner

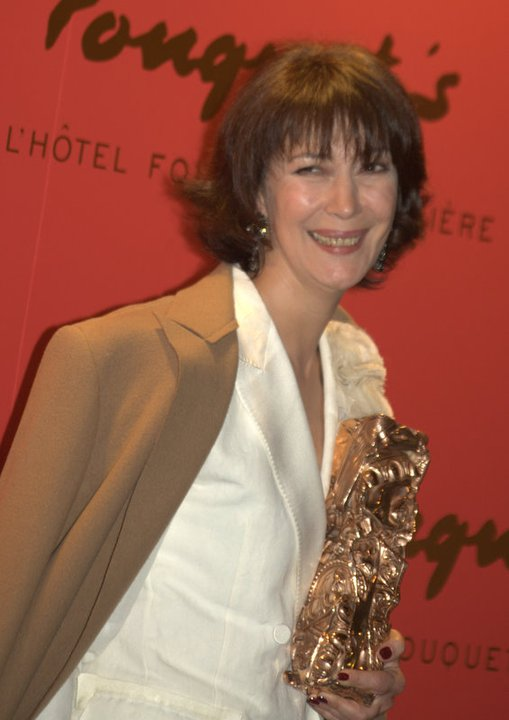
Anne Alvaro, Best Supporting Actress winner

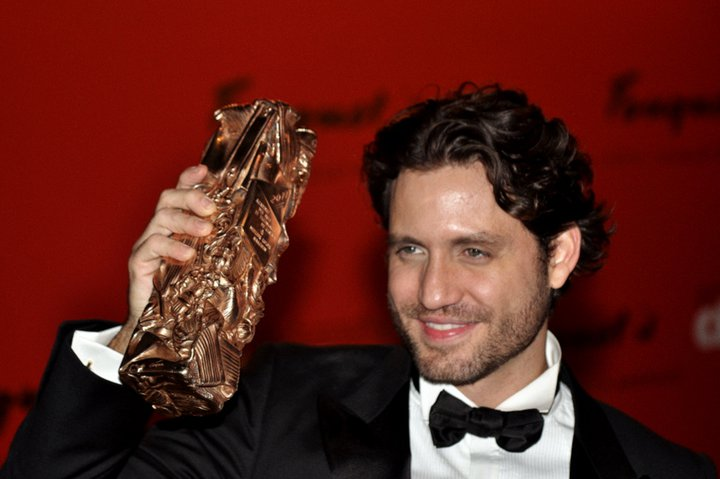
Édgar Ramírez, Most Promising Actor winner

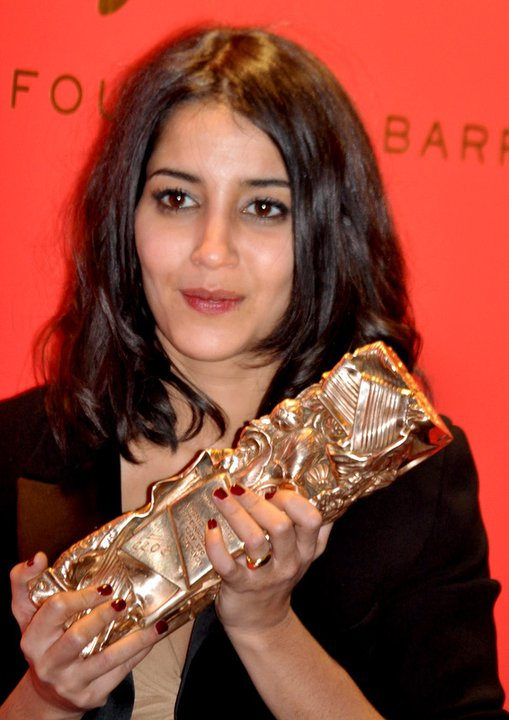
Leïla Bekhti, Most Promising Actress winner

| Best Film (presented by Jodie Foster) Of Gods and Men: Gainsbourg: A Heroic Life; Heartbreaker; The Names of Love; Mammuth; On Tour; The Ghost Writer | Best Director (presented by Nathalie Baye) Roman Polanski – The Ghost Writer: Mathieu Amalric – On Tour; Olivier Assayas – Carlos; Xavier Beauvois – Of Gods and Men; Bertrand Blier – The Clink of Ice |
| Best Actor (presented by Valérie Lemercier) Éric Elmosnino – Gainsbourg: A Heroic Life: Gérard Depardieu – Mammuth; Romain Duris – Heartbreaker; Jacques Gamblin – The Names of Love; Lambert Wilson – Of Gods and Men | Best Actress (presented by François Cluzet) Sara Forestier – The Names of Love: Isabelle Carré – Romantics Anonymous; Catherine Deneuve – Potiche; Charlotte Gainsbourg – The Tree; Kristin Scott Thomas – Sarah's Key |
| Best Supporting Actor (presented by Mélanie Thierry) Michael Lonsdale – Of Gods and Men: Niels Arestrup – The Big Picture; François Damiens – Heartbreaker; Gilles Lellouche – Little White Lies; Olivier Rabourdin – Of Gods and Men | Best Supporting Actress (presented by Guillaume Gallienne) Anne Alvaro – The Clink of Ice: Valérie Bonneton – Little White Lies; Laetitia Casta – Gainsbourg: A Heroic Life; Julie Ferrier – Heartbreaker; Karin Viard – Potiche |
| Most Promising Actor (presented by Emmanuelle Seigner) Édgar Ramírez – Carlos: Arthur Dupont – Bus Palladium; Grégoire Leprince-Ringuet – The Princess of Montpensier; Pio Marmaï – Living on Love Alone; Raphaël Personnaz – The Princess of Montpensier | Most Promising Actress (presented by Pascal Elbé) Leïla Bekhti – Tout ce qui brille: Anaïs Demoustier – Living on Love Alone; Audrey Lamy –, Tout ce qui brille; Léa Seydoux – Belle Épine; Yahima Torres – Black Venus |
| Best Original Screenplay (presented by Emmanuelle Béart) The Names of Love – Baya Kasmi, Michel Leclerc: On Tour – Mathieu Amalric, Marcelo Novais Teles, Philippe Di Folco, Raphaëlle Valbrune; Le Bruit des glaçons – Bertrand Blier; Of Gods and Men – Étienne Comar, Xavier Beauvois; Mammuth – Benoît Delépine, Gustave Kervern | Best Adaptation (presented by Emmanuelle Béart) The Ghost Writer – Robert Harris, Roman Polanski: The Tree – Julie Bertuccelli; The Princess of Montpensier – Jean Cosmos, Francois-Olivier Rousseau, Bertrand Tavernier; The Big Picture – Éric Lartigau, Laurent de Bartillat; Potiche – François Ozon |
| Best First Feature Film (presented by Roman Polanski) Gainsbourg: A Heroic Life: Heartbreaker; Lights Out; Turk's Head; Tout ce qui brille | Best Cinematography: Caroline Champetier – Of Gods and Men; Christophe Beaucarne – On Tour; Paweł Edelman – The Ghost Writer; Bruno de Keyzer – The Princess of Montpensier; Guillaume Schiffman – Gainsbourg: A Heroic Life |
| Best Editing (presented by Elsa Zylberstein and Vincent Pérez): Hervé de Luze – The Ghost Writer; Luc Barnier – Carlos; Annette Dutertre – On Tour; Marie-Julie Maille – Of Gods and Men; Marilyne Monthieux – Gainsbourg: A Heroic Life | Best Sound (presented by Elsa Zylberstein and Vincent Pérez) Daniel Sobrino, Jean Goudier, Cyril Holtz – Gainsbourg: A Heroic Life: Philippe Barbeau, Jerome Wiciak, Florent Lavallee – Oceans; Jean-Marie Blondel, Thomas Desjonquieres, Dean Humphreys – The Ghost Writer; Jean-Jacques Ferran, Vincent Guillon, Éric Bonnard – Of Gods and Men; Olivier Mauvezin, Séverin Favriau, Stéphane Thiebaut – On Tour |
| Best Original Music (presented by Charlotte Le Bon) Alexandre Desplat – The Ghost Writer: Bruno Coulais – Oceans; Grégoire Hetzel – The Tree; Delphine Mantoulet, Tony Gatlif – Korkoro; Yarol Poupaud – Bus Palladium; Philippe Sarde – The Princess of Montpensier | Best Costume Design (presented by Elisa Sednaoui) Caroline De Vivaise – The Princess of Montpensier: Olivier Beriot – The Extraordinary Adventures of Adèle Blanc-Sec; Pascaline Chavanne – Potiche; Alexia Crisp-Jones – On Tour; Marielle Robaut – Of Gods and Men |
| Best Production Design Hugues Tissandier – The Extraordinary Adventures of Adèle Blanc-Sec: Michel Barthelemy – Of Gods and Men; Guy-Claude Francois – The Princess of Montpensier; Albrecht Konrad – The Ghost Writer; Christian Marti – Gainsbourg: A Heroic Life | Best Documentary Film (presented by Jean-Paul Rouve) Oceans: L'Amour fou; Benda Bilili!; Cleveland vs. Wall Street; Into Our Own Hands |
| Best Animated Film (presented by Élie Semoun) The Illusionist: Arthur 3: The War of the Two Worlds; The Man in the Blue Gordini; Logorama; A Cat in Paris | Best Short Film (presented by François Damiens) Logorama: Monsieur l'Abbé; Petit Tailleur; Une pute et un poussin; Un Transport en Commun |
| Best Foreign Film (presented by Virginie Efira and Tomer Sisley) The Social Network: Heartbeats; Bright Star; The Secret in Their Eyes; Illegal; Inception; Invictus | |
Honorary César (presented by Diane Kruger and Christoph Waltz) Quentin Tarantino
Prix Daniel Toscan du Plantier Yaël Fogiel and Laetitia Gonzalez

== Films with multiple nominations and awards ==
The following films received multiple nominations:

| Nominations | Film |
|---|---|
| 11 | Of Gods and Men |
| 8 | The Ghost Writer |
| 8 | Gainsbourg: A Heroic Life |
| 7 | On Tour |
| 7 | The Princess of Montpensier |
| 5 | Heartbreaker |
| 4 | The Names of Love |
| 4 | Potiche |
| 3 | Mammuth |
| 3 | Carlos |
| 3 | The Tree |
| 3 | Tout ce qui brille |
| 3 | Oceans |
| 3 | The Clink of Ice |
2
| 2 | Little White Lies |
| 2 | The Big Picture |
| 2 | Living on Love Alone |
| 2 | Bus Palladium |
| 2 | The Extraordinary Adventures of Adèle Blanc-Sec |
| 2 | Logorama |

The following films received multiple awards:

| Awards | Film |
|---|---|
| 4 | The Ghost Writer |
| 3 | Of Gods and Men |
| 3 | Gainsbourg: A Heroic Life |
| 2 | The Names of Love |

== Viewers ==
The show was followed by 2.9 million viewers. This corresponds to 14.5% of the audience.

== See also ==
- 83rd Academy Awards
- 64th British Academy Film Awards
- 23rd European Film Awards
- 16th Lumière Awards
- 1st Magritte Awards
- 26th Goya Awards
- 56th David di Donatello
