= Mordac =

Mordac may refer to:

- Mordac, Earl of Menteith, in 12th century Scotland
- Mordac, "Preventer of Information Services" in the Dilbert comic strip; see List of Dilbert characters § Mordac,
- Mordac, a character in Flanders (film), a 2006 French war drama
