= Living on Love (disambiguation) =

Living on Love is a 1937 American film.

Living on Love may also refer to:

- Livin' on Love, a 2002 album by Ilse de Lange
- "Livin' on Love", a 1994 song by Alan Jackson
- "Living On Love", a 2000 song by John Berry from the album Faces

== See also ==
- Living on Love Alone, a 2010 French film
