= Une vie meilleure =

- Theatrical release poster
- Directed by: Cédric Kahn
- Screenplay by: Cédric Kahn; Catherine Paillé
- Produced by: Kristina Larsen; Daniel Louis; Denise Robert; Gilles Sandoz
- Starring: Guillaume Canet; Leïla Bekhti; Slimane Khettabi
- Cinematography: Pascal Marti
- Edited by: Simon Jacquet
- Music by: Akido
- Production company: Les Films du Lendemain
- Distributed by: Mars Distribution
- Release dates: 13 September 2011 (Toronto); 4 January 2012 (France)
- Running time: 110 minutes
- Country: France
- Language: French
- Budget: $6.4 million
- Box office: $4 million

Une vie meilleure, also known by its English release title A Better Life, is a 2011 French film directed by Cédric Kahn and starring Guillaume Canet, Leïla Bekhti and introducing Slimane Khettabi.

== Plot ==
Yann (Guillaume Canet) and Nadia (Leïla Bekhti) fall in love. Nadia has acquired a crumbling building in a Paris suburb and the couple decide to renovate it to launch a restaurant. But things turn upside down, high financing costs make things difficult, and Nadia, has to accept a temporary work opportunity in Montreal to pitch in with extra money. She has to leave her son Slimane (Slimane Khettabi) to Yann. Things get even worse when Nadia disappears without a trace. Yann has to sell the building at a low price, not enough to pay all his debts, and has to move with Slimane from his nearby caravan to an unattractive room, which he rents from the buyer. He robs the man and travels with Slimane to Canada. He finds Nadia, she is in custody. He comes to the prison but at first she refuses to accept the visit. The next day she allows him to visit her but to Slimane's regret she refuses to see him, out of shame. She is there for drug possession, but she is innocent. The next time she allows Yann to visit her with Slimane.

== Cast ==
- Guillaume Canet : Yann
- Leïla Bekhti : Nadia
- Slimane Khettabi : Slimane
- Brigitte Sy : The indebtedness volunteer
- Arnaud Ducret : Nadia's boss

== Awards and nominations ==
- 2011: Director Cédric Kahn nominated for "Tokyo Grand Prix" of the Tokyo International Film Festival
- 2011: Actor Guillaume Canet won "Best Actor Award" at the Rome Film Festival
