= Céleste Brunnquell =

French actress (born 2002)

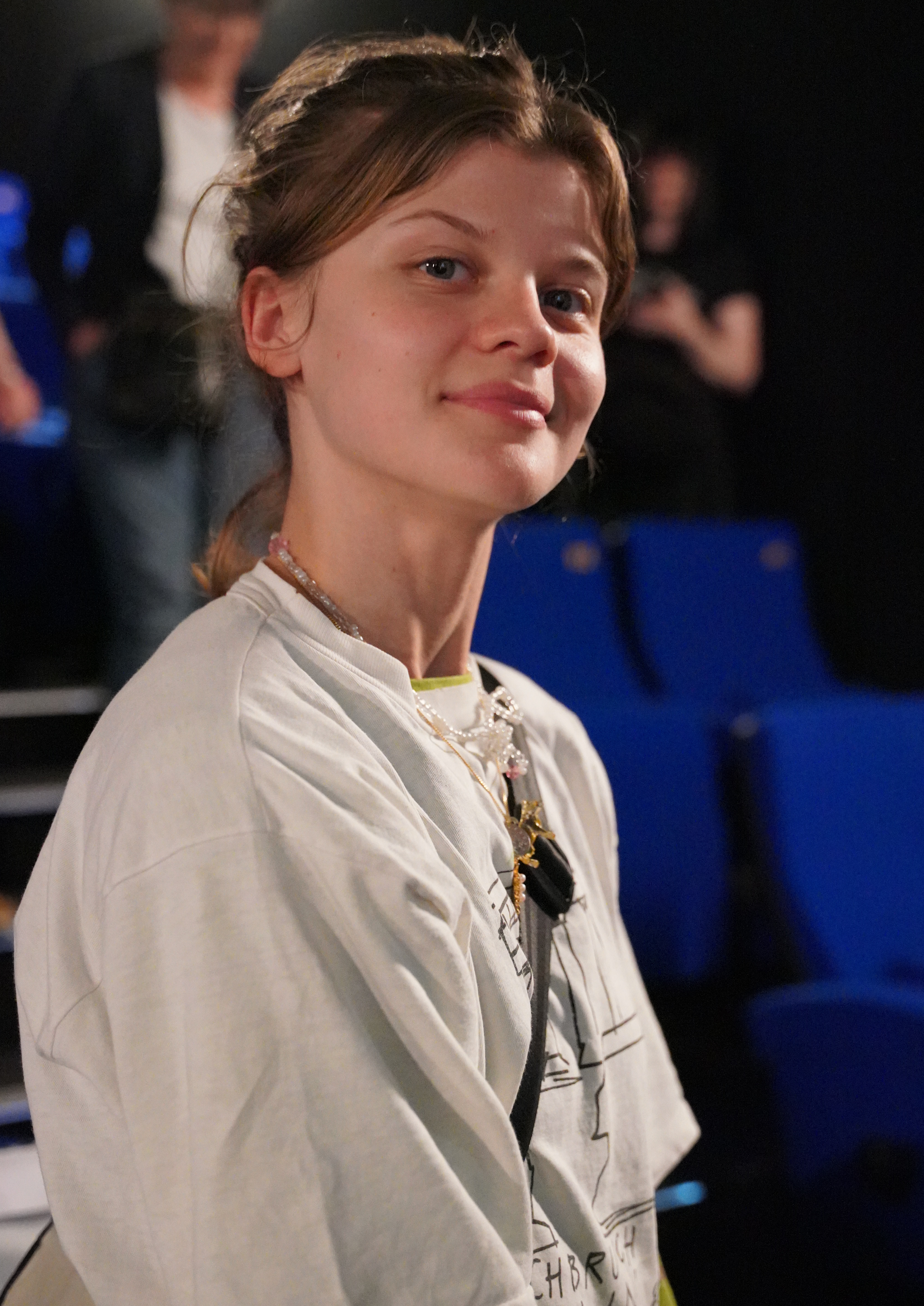
- Born: 24 July 2002 (age 23); Paris, France
- Occupation: Actress

Céleste Brunnquell (born 24 July 2002) is a French actress.

== Career ==
In 2019, she made her on-screen debut in The Dazzled, the first movie directed by French actress, Sarah Suco. For her role, she was nominated to the César Award for Most Promising Actress and the Lumière Award for Best Female Revelation.

In 2021, she had a recurring role in the television series In Therapy, broadcast on Arte. For her performance on the show she received the ACS Award for Best Actress.

The following year, she made her theater debut with the play Oublie-moi, written by Noémie Lvovsky and directed by Julie Duclos. The same year, she play Jeanne Patterson in the thriller drama The Origin of Evil, directed by Sébastien Marnier. She also starred in Fifi alongside Quentin Dolmaire.

In 2023, she starred in two films: No Love Lost (La fille de son père) with Nahuel Pérez Biscayart, and For Night Will Come (En attendant la nuit), directed by Céline Rouzet, which was presented at the 80th Venice International Film Festival. For her performance in No Love Lost, she received her second nomination for the César Award for Most Promising Actress.

== Filmography ==
Key
†	Denotes film or TV productions that have not yet been released

Year	Title	Role	Notes
2019	The Dazzled	Camille Lourmel	Nominated - César Award for Most Promising Actress; Nominated - Lumière Award for Best Female Revelation
2021	H24	The young girl	TV series (1 episode)
2021	In Therapy	Camille	TV series (7 episodes); Nominated - ACS Award for Best Actress
2022	The Origin of Evil	Jeanne Patterson	
2022	Fifi	Sophie	
2022	Celles qui restent	Lou	Short film
2022	Pierre la tombe	Victoria	Short film
2023	No Love Lost	Rosa Gravier	
2023	For Night Will Come	Camila Berthier	
2024	Being Maria	Noor	
TBA	Une Affaire de Principe †		Post-production

== Theater ==
Year	Title	Author	Director
2022	Oublie-moi	Noémie Lvovsky	Julie Duclos

== Accolades ==
Award	Date of ceremony	Category	Film	Result	Ref.
César Awards	28 February 2020	Most Promising Actress	The Dazzled	Nominated	
César Awards	23 February 2024	Most Promising Actress	No Love Lost	Nominated	
Lumière Awards	27 January 2020	Best Female Revelation	The Dazzled	Nominated	
