= Pieces of Me (film) =

- Film poster
- French: Des morceaux de moi
- Directed by: Nolwenn Lemesle
- Starring: Adèle Exarchopoulos; Zabou Breitman; Tchéky Karyo
- Release date: 2 October 2012 (FIFF)
- Running time: 90 minutes
- Country: France
- Language: French

Pieces of Me (French: Des morceaux de moi) is a 2012 French comedy film directed by Nolwenn Lemesle.

== Cast ==
- Adèle Exarchopoulos as Erell
- Zabou Breitman as Christine
- Tchéky Karyo as Edern
- Adélaïde Leroux as Sarah
- Bruno Lochet as Bob
