= Judith Henry (actress) =

French actress (born 1968)

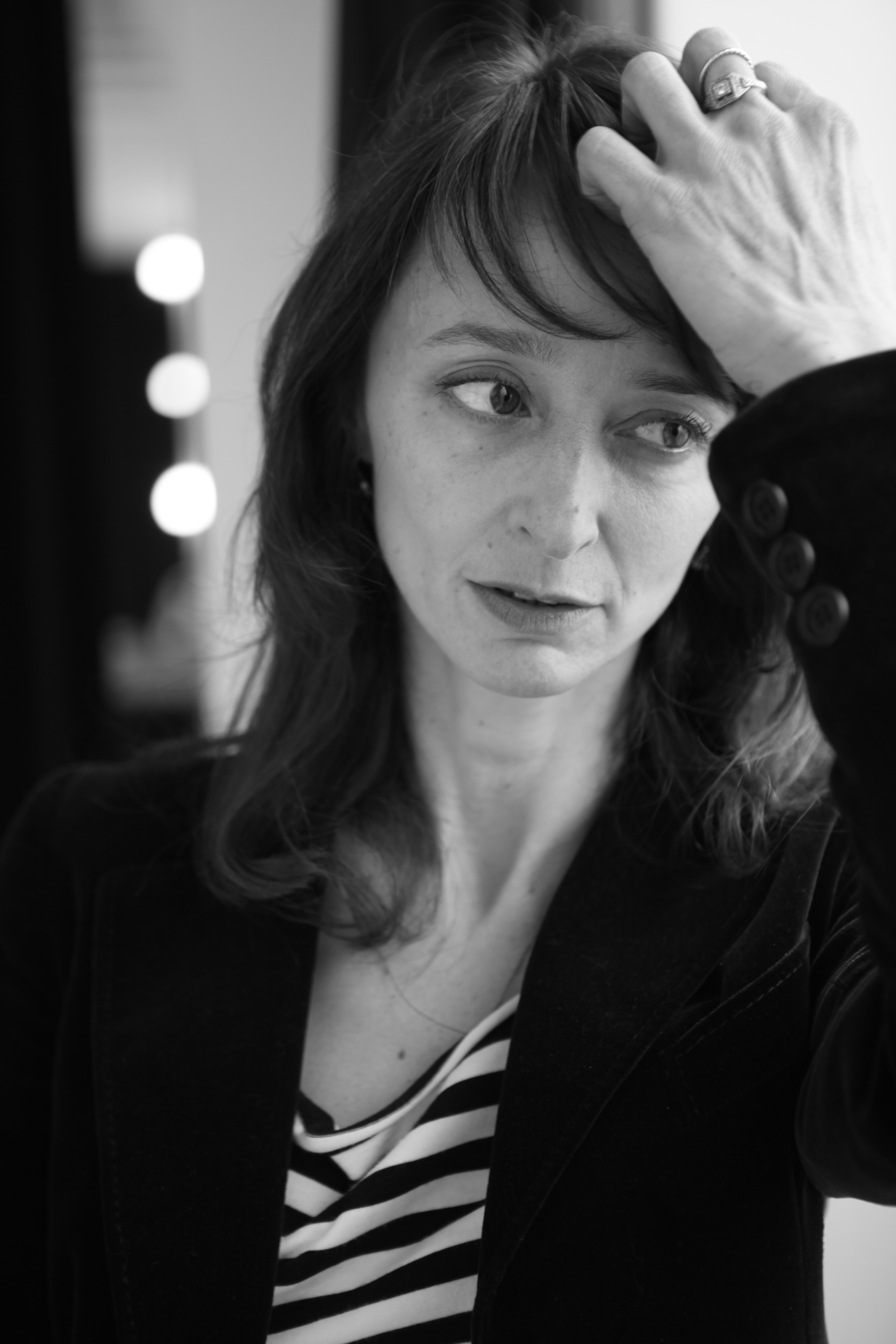
- Judith Henry in 2010
- Born: 16 May 1968 (age 58); Paris, France
- Occupation: Actress
- Years active: 1982-present

Judith Henry (born 16 May 1968) is a French actress. She has appeared in more than forty films and TV series since 1982.

== Selected filmography ==
Year	Title	Role	Notes
2022	Kompromat	Michèle	
2014	Nicholas on Holiday	Mme Bernique	
2013	Je fais le mort	Caroline	
2010	Top Floor, Left Wing		
2008	Les Grandes Personnes	Christine	
1995	The Apprentices		
1995	...à la campagne		
1993	Germinal	Catherine	
1990	La Discrète		

== Awards ==
- César Award for Most Promising Actress (1991)
