= The Source (2011 film) =

2011 film

- Theatrical release poster
- Directed by: Radu Mihăileanu
- Written by: Alain-Michel Blanc; Radu Mihăileanu
- Produced by: Luc Besson; Radu Mihăileanu
- Starring: Leïla Bekhti; Hafsia Herzi
- Cinematography: Glynn Speeckaert
- Edited by: Ludo Troch
- Music by: Armand Amar
- Production companies: Elzevir Films; Oï Oï Oï Productions
- Distributed by: EuropaCorp Distribution
- Release dates: 21 May 2011 (Cannes); 2 November 2011 (France)
- Running time: 135 minutes
- Countries: France; Belgium; Italy
- Languages: French; Arabic
- Budget: $7.9 million
- Box office: $4.6 million

The Source (French: La Source des femmes) is a 2011 French drama-comedy film directed by Radu Mihăileanu, starring Leïla Bekhti and Hafsia Herzi. It premiered In Competition at the 2011 Cannes Film Festival.

== Plot ==
Set in a remote village in North Africa, the story focuses on women who go on a sex strike against having to fetch water from a distant well. The story is an adaptation of the ancient Greek comedy Lysistrata.

== Cast ==
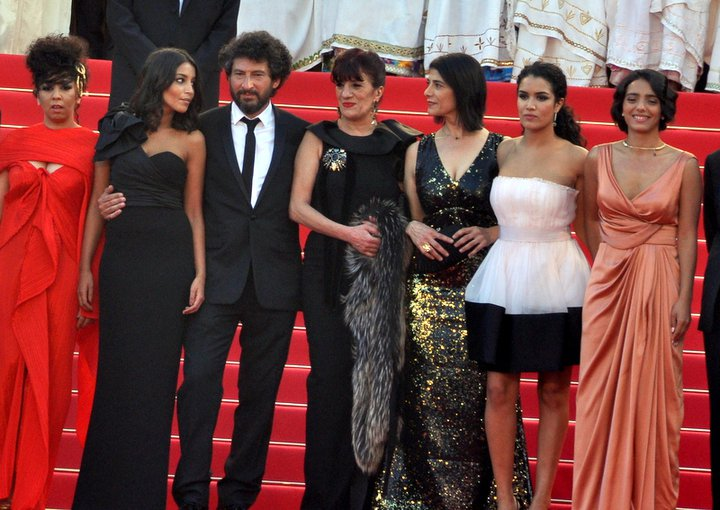
Cast and crew at the Cannes Film Festival for the premiere of the film

- Leïla Bekhti as Leila
- Hafsia Herzi as Loubna Esmeralda
- Sabrina Ouazani as Rachida
- Saleh Bakri as Sami
- Hiam Abbass as Fatima
- Biyouna as The Old Gun
- Zinedine Soualem

== Production ==
The film was produced by France's Elzevir Films and Oï Oï Oï Productions, in co-production with France 3 Cinéma and EuropaCorp. Other than the 64% French investment, Belgian companies contributed 14%, Italian 12% and Moroccan 10%. It was pre-bought by Canal+ and CinéCinéma and received support from Eurimages. The total budget was 7.99 million euro.

== Release ==
The Source premiered in competition at the 2011 Cannes Film Festival on 21 May. EuropaCorp Distribution released it in France on 2 November 2011.

== Accolades ==
Award / Film Festival	Category	Recipients and nominees	Result
Cannes Film Festival	Palme d'Or		Nominated
César Award	Best Actress	Leïla Bekhti	Nominated
César Award	Best Costume Design	Viorica Petrovici	Nominated
Globes de Cristal Award	Best Actress	Leïla Bekhti	Nominated
