= Who Killed Bambi? (2003 film) =

2003 film

- Film poster
- Directed by: Gilles Marchand
- Written by: Gilles Marchand; Vincent Dietschy
- Produced by: Barbara Letellier
- Starring: Laurent Lucas; Sophie Quinton; Catherine Jacob
- Cinematography: Pierre Milon
- Edited by: Robin Campillo
- Music by: François-Eudes Chanfrault
- Distributed by: Haut et Court
- Release date: 17 May 2003
- Running time: 126 minutes
- Country: France
- Language: French
- Budget: $3.8 million
- Box office: $973,000

Who Killed Bambi? (French: Qui a tué Bambi ?) is a 2003 French thriller film directed by Gilles Marchand. In this film, a doctor and a nursing student investigate the mysterious disappearances taking place at their hospital.

== Cast ==
- Sophie Quinton as Isabelle / Bambi
- Laurent Lucas as Dr. Philipp
- Catherine Jacob as Véronique
- Yasmine Belmadi as Sami
- Michèle Moretti as Mme Vachon
- Valérie Donzelli as Nathalie
- Fily Keita as Marion
- Sophie Medina as Carole
- Jean Dell as The otorhinolaryngology
- Joséphine de Meaux as The mute nurse
- Jean-Claude Jay as The white-haired surgeon
- Aladin Reibel as The fair-headed anaesthetist
- Thierry Bosc as The general manager
- Lucia Sanchez as The Spanish nurse

== Release ==
It was screened out of competition at the 2003 Cannes Film Festival.

== Critical response ==
On Rotten Tomatoes, the film holds an approval rating of 43%, based on 21 reviews, with an average rating of 5.4/10. On Metacritic the film has a score of 47 out of 100, based on eight critics, indicating "mixed or average reviews".

== Accolades ==
Award / Film Festival	Category	Recipients and nominees	Result
César Awards	Best First Feature Film		Nominated
César Awards	Most Promising Actress	Sophie Quinton	Nominated
