= Anaïs Demoustier =

French actress (born 1987)

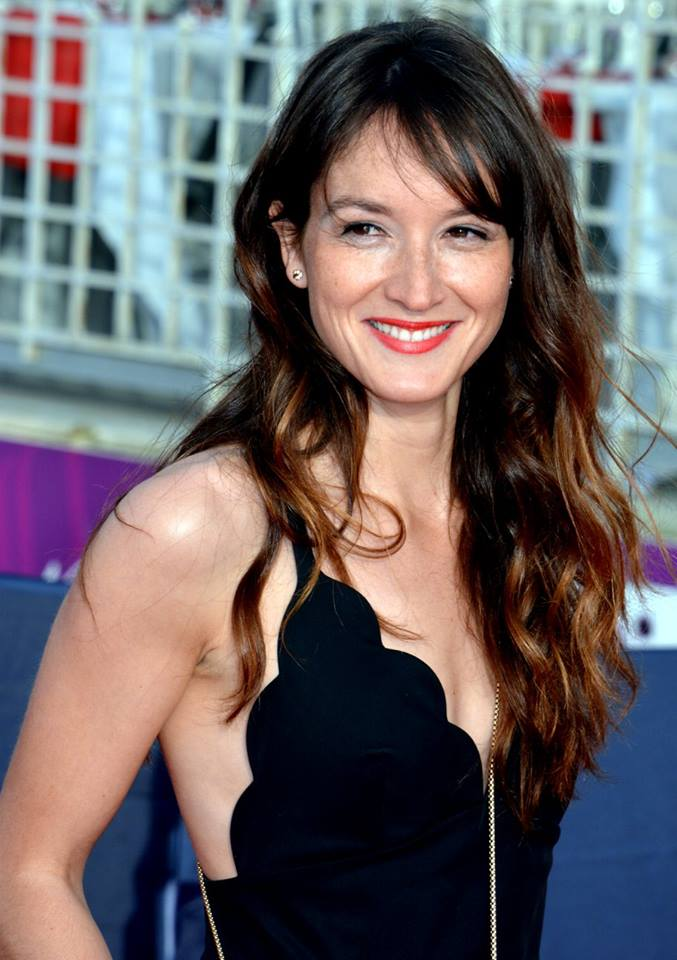
- Demoustier in 2018
- Born: Anaïs Aude Marie Michèle Demoustier; 29 September 1987 (age 38); Lille, France
- Occupation: Actress
- Years active: 2000–present
- Partner: Jérémie Elkaïm
- Children: 2

Anaïs Aude Marie Michèle Demoustier (French: [anais dəmustje]; born 29 September 1987) is a French actress. She was nominated for Most Promising Actress twice at the César Awards, in 2009 for Les Grandes Personnes and in 2011 for Living on Love Alone. In 2020, she won the César for Best Actress for her performance in the film Alice and the Mayor.

In April 2023, Demoustier was announced as the president of the Caméra d'Or Jury for the 2023 Cannes Film Festival.

== Personal life ==
During the filming of Marguerite & Julien, Demoustier began dating her co-star, Jérémie Elkaïm. In December 2015, it was announced that the couple were expecting their first child. Demoustier gave birth to a daughter in March 2016 and a son in 2024.

Her brother, Stéphane Demoustier, is a filmmaker and screenwriter.

== Filmography ==
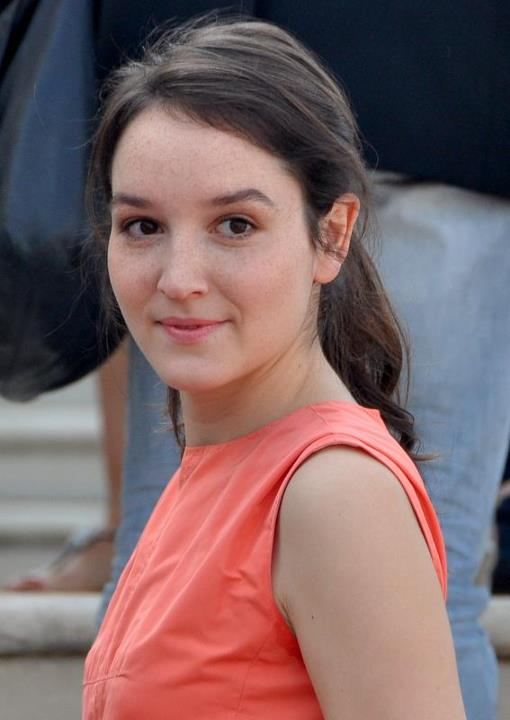
Demoustier at the 2012 Cannes Film Festival

Year	Title	Role	Notes
2000	Marty's World	Jennifer	
2003	Time of the Wolf	Eva	
2004	Conflit de canards	Girl	Short film
2006	Pour de vrai		Short film
2006	Ma culotte	Lydia	Short film
2006	Barrage	Lydie	
2006	L'année suivante	Emmanuelle	
2006	C.I.D.	Roxane Bellini	TV series (episode: "Abus de faiblesse")
2007	Hellphone	Clémence	
2007	The Price to Pay	Justine Ménard	
2007	Reporters	Morgane	TV series (1 episode)
2007	Raymond	Bertille / Lucille / Eddy (voice)	TV series
2007	Au bout de mon rêve	Laetitia	TV movie
2007	Les murs porteurs	Mélanie Rosenfeld	
2007	Un bébé tout neuf		Short film
2008	The Beautiful Person	Catherine	
2008	Les Grandes Personnes	Jeanne	
2008	Give Me Your Hand	Clémentine	
2009	Sois sage	Ève	
2009	Angelo, tyran de Padoue		TV movie
2009	Les Petits Meurtres d'Agatha Christie	Louise	TV series (episode: "La plume empoisonnée")
2010	Sweet Evil	Céline	
2010	Monsieur l'abbé		Short film
2010	Dans la jungle des villes	Julia	Short film
2010	George and Fanchette	Fanchette	TV movie
2010	Belle Épine	Sonia Cohen	
2010	Elsewhere	Jeanne	
2010	Living on Love Alone	Julie Bataille	
2010	Fracture	Anna Kagan	TV movie
2010	Pauline	Pauline	Short film
2011	Elles	Charlotte	
2011	The Snows of Kilimanjaro	Flo	
2011	Des noeuds dans la tête	Élise	Short film
2011	Last Winter	Julie	
2012	Thérèse Desqueyroux	Anne de la Trave	
2012	Fille du calvaire		Short film (uncredited)
2012	La joie de vivre	Pauline	TV movie
2013	Quai d'Orsay	Marina	
2013	Loulou, l'incroyable secret	Scarlett (voice)	
2014	Situation amoureuse: C'est compliqué	Juliette	
2014	Bird People	Audrey Camuzet	
2014	Paris Follies	Marion	
2014	Ariane's Thread	Martine / Actress	
2014	The New Girlfriend	Claire	
2015	All About Them	Mélodie	
2015	Caprice	Caprice	
2015	Marguerite & Julien	Marguerite de Ravalet	
2015	Démons	Jenna	Telefilm
2016	Sophie's Misfortunes	Madame de Fleurville	
2016	The Girl Without Hands	The Young Girl	Voice
2017	Demain et tous les autres jours		
2017	Jalouse	Mélanie Pick	
2017	La Villa	Bérangère	
2017	Cornelius, le meunier hurlant		
2018	Sauver ou périr	Cécile	
2018	Au poste !	Fiona	
2019	Alice and the Mayor	Alice Heimann	César Award for Best Actress; Nominated - Lumière Award for Best Actress
2019	The Girl with a Bracelet	Avocat général	
2019	Gloria Mundi	Mathilda	
2021	Anaïs in Love	Anaïs	
2021	The Love Letter	Léa	
2022	Incredible but True	Jeanne	
2022	Coma	Ashley	voice
2022	Smoking Causes Coughing	Nicotine	
2022	November	Inès Moreau	
2023	The Beast in the Jungle	May	
2023	Along Came Love	Madeleine Villedieu	
2023	Daaaaaalí!	Judith	
2024	The Count of Monte Cristo	Mercédès Herrera	
2025	Asterix and Obelix: The Big Fight	Metadata (voice)	Animated mini-series
2026	One Minute to Midnight		

== Awards and nominations ==
Year	Nominated work	Award	Category	Result
2008	L'Année suivante	César Awards	Révélations des César	N.A
2009	Les Grandes Personnes	Cabourg Film Festival	Best Female Newcomer	Won
2009	Les Grandes Personnes	César Awards	Most Promising Actress	Nominated
2010	Sois sage	César Awards	Révélations des César	N.A
2010	—	Berlin International Film Festival	Shooting Stars Award	Won
2010	L'Enfance du mal	Karlovy Vary International Film Festival	Best Actress	Won
2011	Living on Love Alone	César Awards	Most Promising Actress	Nominated
2011	—	Prix Romy Schneider	—	Won
2011	Le Problème	Molière Award	Best Female Newcomer	Nominated
2011	The Snows of Kilimanjaro	Étoiles d'Or	Best Female Newcomer	Won
2011	Elles	Étoiles d'Or	Best Female Newcomer	Won
2011	La Joie de vivre	Festival de la fiction TV de la Rochelle	Young Actress Award	Won
2012	Elles	Eurasia International Film Festival	Best Female Performance	Won
2015	All About Them	Cabourg Film Festival	Best Actress	Won
2025	The Count of Monte Cristo	César Awards	Best Supporting Actress	Nominated
