= ...à la campagne =

- French Film Poster
- Directed by: Manuel Poirier
- Written by: Manuel Poirier
- Produced by: Maurice Bernart
- Starring: Benoît Régent; Judith Henry
- Cinematography: Nara Keo Kosal
- Edited by: Hervé Schneid
- Music by: Charlélie Couture
- Release date: 5 April 1995
- Running time: 108 minutes
- Country: France
- Language: French
- Budget: $1.7 million
- Box office: $915.000

...à la campagne is a French film directed by Manuel Poirier, released 5 April 1995.

== Plot ==
Benoît has chosen a peaceful life in the countryside. When Lila arrives in town to join her sister, she and Benoît get to know each other. However, Lila struggles with country life, and one day, she leaves. Despite his friends' support, Benoît realizes his life feels empty without her.

== Starring ==
- Benoît Régent : Benoît
- Judith Henry : Lila
- Sergi López : Pablo
- Jean-Jacques Vanier : Gaston
- Serge Riaboukine : Emile
- Élisabeth Commelin : Mylène
- Laure Duthilleul : Françoise
- Élisabeth Vitali : Cathy
- Céline Poirier : Céline
- Philippe Duquesne
- Olivier Broche
