= Les Grandes Personnes =

- Film poster
- Directed by: Anna Novion
- Written by: Béatrice Colombier; Anna Novion; Mathieu Robin
- Produced by: Christie Molia; Olivier Guerpillon
- Starring: Jean-Pierre Darroussin; Anaïs Demoustier
- Cinematography: Pierre Novion
- Edited by: Anne Souriau
- Music by: Pascal Bideau
- Production companies: Moteur S'il Vous Plaît; Dfm Fiktion; Film i Väst
- Distributed by: Memento Films (France)
- Release dates: 12 November 2008 (France); 5 December 2008 (Sweden)
- Running time: 84 minutes
- Countries: France; Sweden
- Languages: French; Swedish; English
- Budget: €1.7 million
- Box office: $1.2 million

Les Grandes Personnes is a 2008 French-Swedish comedy-drama film directed by Anna Novion. It was screened in the International Critics' Week section at the 2008 Cannes Film Festival.

== Cast ==
- Jean-Pierre Darroussin as Albert
- Anaïs Demoustier as Jeanne
- Judith Henry as Christine
- Lia Boysen as Anika
- Jakob Eklund as Per
- Anastasios Soulis as Magnus
- Björn Gustafsson as Johan
- Mirja Turestedt as Waitress
- Dag Malmberg as Magnus's father
- Åsa Karlin as Magnus's mother

== Accolades ==
Award / Film Festival	Category	Recipients and nominees	Result
Cabourg Film Festival	Female Revelation	Anaïs Demoustier	Won
César Awards	Most Promising Actress	Anaïs Demoustier	Nominated
