= Christian Vincent (director) =

French film director

- Born: 5 November 1955 (age 69); Paris, France
- Occupation(s): Film director, screenwriter
- Years active: 1983–present

Christian Vincent (born 5 November 1955) is a French film director and screenwriter. He won the César Awards for Best Feature Film and Best Original Screenplay or Adaptation for his 1990 film La Discrète.

== Filmography ==
Short film

Year	Title	Director	Writer	Notes
1983	Il ne faut jurer de rien	Yes	Yes	
1985	Classique	Yes	Yes	
1987	La Part maudite	Yes	Yes	Documentary short (also as cinematographer)

Feature film

Year	Title	Director	Writer	Notes
1990	La Discrète	Yes	Yes	
1992	Beau fixe	Yes	Yes	
1994	La Séparation	Yes	Yes	
1997	What's so Funny About Me?	Yes		
1999	Peut-être		Yes	
2000	Sauve-moi	Yes	Yes	
2004	Textiles		Yes	
2005	The Children	Yes	Yes	
2006	Four Stars	Yes	Yes	
2012	Haute Cuisine	Yes	Yes	
2013	Les Complices	Yes	Yes	Telefilm
2015	Courted	Yes	Yes	

== Awards and nominations ==
Year	Title	Award/Nomination
1983	Il ne faut jurer de rien	Clermont-Ferrand International Short Film Festival – Best Screenplay
1987	La Part maudite	Cinéma du Réel – Heritage Award
1990	La Discrète	César Award for Best First Feature Film; César Award for Best Original Screenplay or Adaptation; French Syndicate of Cinema Critics – Best French Film; 47th Venice International Film Festival – FIPRESCI Prize (Critics Week)
1994	La Séparation	Nominated—Satellite Award for Best Foreign Language Film
2015	Courted	72nd Venice International Film Festival – Best Screenplay; Nominated—Lumière Award for Best Film; Nominated—72nd Venice International Film Festival – Golden Lion
