= Sophie Quinton =

French actress

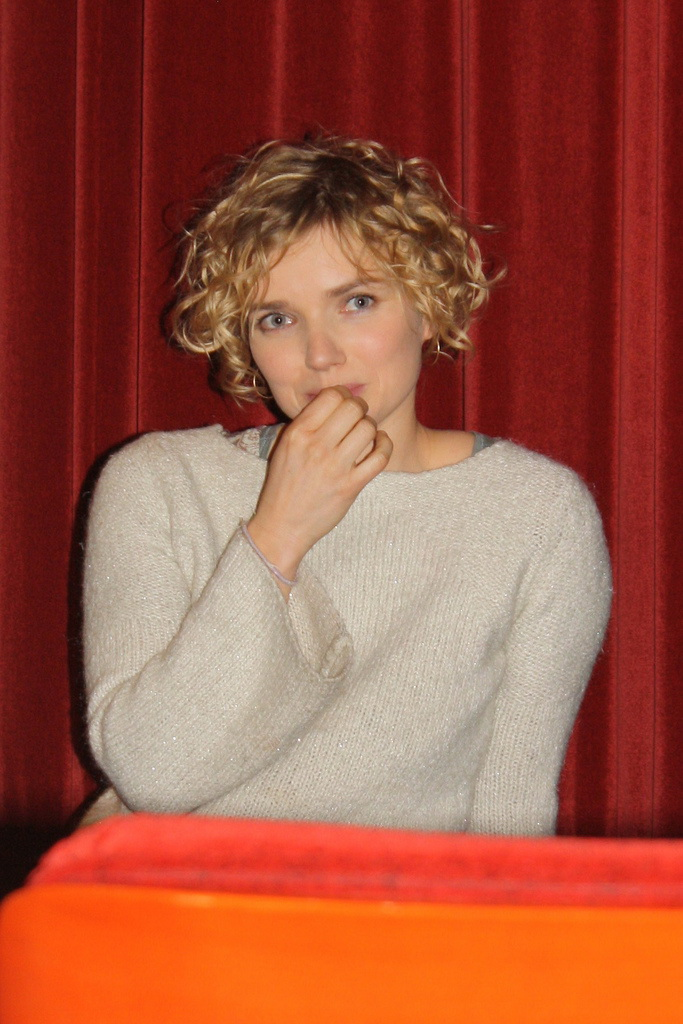
- Quinton in January 2011
- Born: 31 August 1976 (age 48); Villedieu-les-Poêles, France
- Occupation: Actress
- Years active: 2000–present

Sophie Quinton (born 31 August 1976) is a French actress. She has played in a number of short films directed by Gérald Hustache-Mathieu and starred in the 2003 film Who Killed Bambi?.

== Life and career ==
Born into a farming family in Villedieu-les-Poêles, Lower Normandy, Sophie Quinton studied drama at the Millet High School in Cherbourg. The films Peau d' Ane and La nuit americaine inspired her love of cinema. After leaving school, Quinton joined a small street-theatre group.

She first came to the attention of critics in two short films by Gerald Hustache-Mathieu: Peau de Vache (for which she won the award for Best Performance at the Clermont-Ferrand Festival) and La Chatte Andalouse.

Quinton was introduced to a wider audience when she played the heroine in Qui a tué Bambi ? which earned her a César nomination for Most Promising Newcomer.

In 2005, she joined forces with Gérald Hustache-Mathieu for his first feature film, Avril.

Sophie Quinton has two sons.

== Selected filmography ==
Year	Title	Role	Director
2003	Who Killed Bambi?	Isabelle aka "Bambi"	Gilles Marchand
2003	Lightweight	Claire	Jean-Pierre Améris
2006	April in Love	April	Gérald Hustache-Mathieu
2008	Mark of an Angel	Laurence	Safy Nebbou
2011	Nobody Else But You	Candice	Gérald Hustache-Mathieu
2011	Le Skylab	Aunt Clémentine	Julie Delpy
2012	One Night	Louise Morvand	Lucas Belvaux
2012	Queen of Montreuil	Laurent's mistress	Sólveig Anspach
2013	Ouf	Anna	Yann Coridian
2016-17	Capitaine Marleau	Young Katel / Corinne Vidal	Josée Dayan

== Awards and nominations ==
List of awards and nominations
Year	Title of work	Award	Category	Result
2002	Peau de vache	Lutins du court métrage	Best Actress	Won
2003	Who Killed Bambi?	César Award	Most Promising Actress	Nominated
2003	La chatte andalouse	Lutins du court métrage	Best Actress	Won
