= Dag Malmberg =

Swedish actor and director (born 1953)

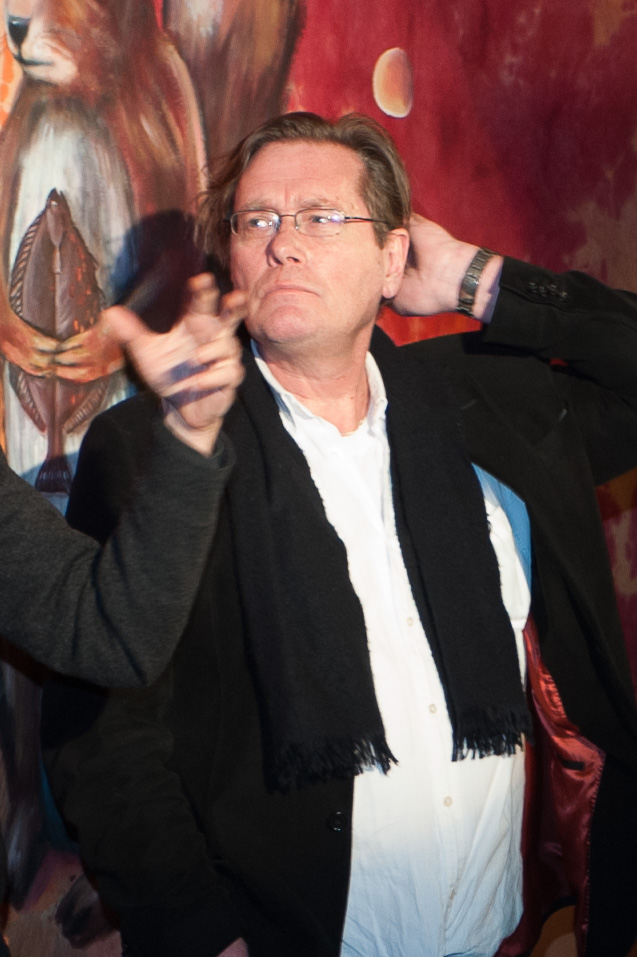
- Dag Malmberg in Stockholm, February 2010
- Born: 18 January 1953 (age 72); Gävle, Sweden
- Occupation(s): Actor, film director

Dag Åke Sigvard Malmberg (born 18 January 1953) is a Swedish actor and director, best known internationally for his role as Hans Petterson in The Bridge.

== Biography ==
Dag Malmberg was born January 18 1953 in Gävle, Sweden.

Malmberg studied sociology and history at University of Gothenburg before turning to acting, working as first a dockworker before starting first as a stagehand and then assistant at the Gothenburg City Theatre. At 27 he started to study drama at the Gothenburg Theatre School. Dag Malmberg has since worked at Unga Riks, Borås City Theater 1986, Gothenburg City Theater 1987 – 1986 and 2002 – 2003 and in between guest performances in Malmö, at the National Swedish Touring Theatre, Stockholm City Theater and Norrbottensteatern.

Malmberg has also directed TV series Älskade Lotten and Vita lögner. As an actor, he starred at the TV series Glappet (1997) and Mauritz Ekeblad i Sjätte dagen (1999 – 2001).

== Personal life ==
He is married to actress Jill Ung.

== Filmography ==
- "Spring Tide" (2016)
- Call Girl (2012)
- The Bridge (2011 – 2018)
- Saltön (2010)
- Göta kanal 3 – Kanalkungens hemlighet (2009)
- Stenhuggaren (2009)
- Les Grandes Personnes (2008)
- Irene Huss (2007 – 2011)
- Kodenavn Hunter (2007) (TV)
- Saltön (2007)
- Saltön (2005)
- Krama mig (2005)
- En sång för Martin (2001)
- Den bästa sommaren (2000)
- Jakten på en mördare (1999)
- Sjätte dagen (1999)
- Glappet (1997)
- År av drömmar (1994)
- Träpatronerna (1998)

== Director ==
- Vita lögner (1997)
