= Leïla Bekhti =

French actress (born 1984)

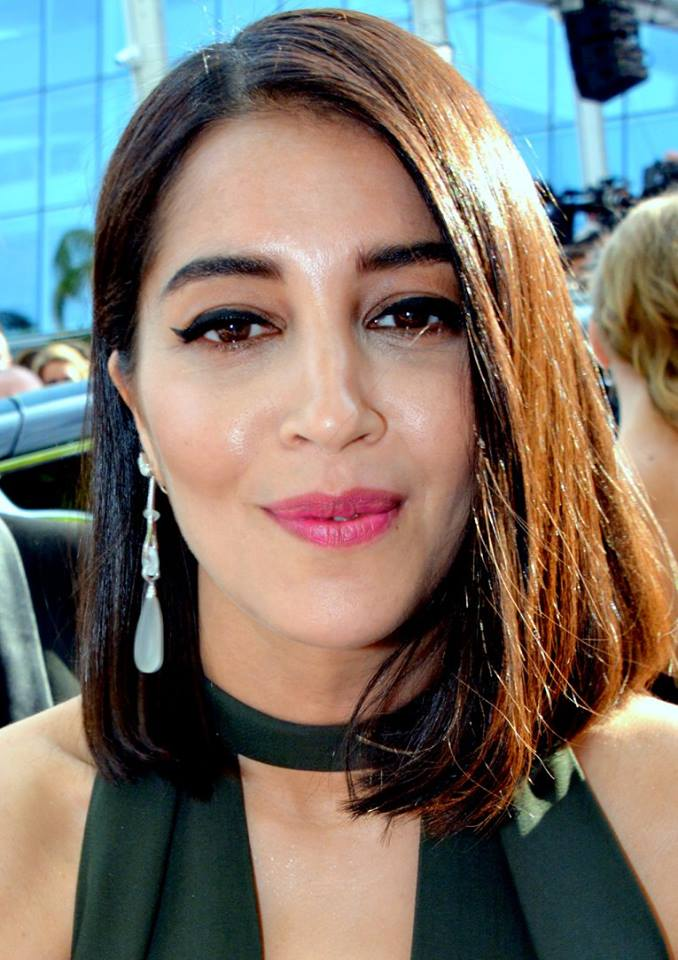
- Bekhti in 2018
- Born: Yasmine Leïla Bekhti; 6 March 1984 (age 42); Issy-les-Moulineaux, France
- Occupation: Actress
- Years active: 2005–present
- Spouse: Tahar Rahim (m. 2010)
- Children: 4

Yasmine Leïla Bekhti (born 6 March 1984) is a French film and television actress. She is best known for her roles in Tout ce qui brille (2010) and, in 2006, Paris, je t'aime and Sheitan.

== Early life ==
Bekhti was born in 1984 in Issy-les-Moulineaux to an Algerian family from Sidi Bel-Abbes. She is the youngest of three children.

Bekhti went to drama school in Paris (18^{e}) before entering the programme of Stéphane Gildas in Tolbiac. She next studied in the programme of Bérengère Basty at the Art’aire studio. To live and pay for her acting studies, she worked odd jobs in clothing and telemarketing.

She has self-identified as a Muslim and speaks Algerian Arabic as well, because of her grandmother.

== Career ==
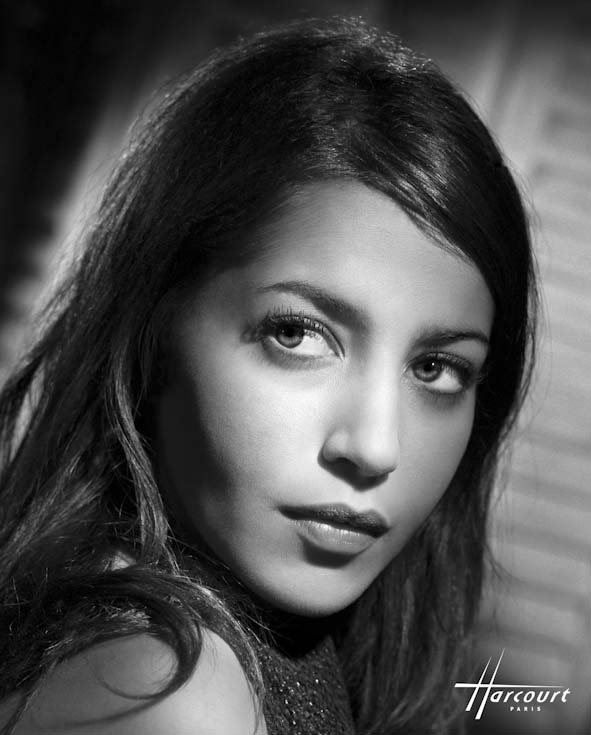
Leïla Bekhti in 2009.

In 2005, Bekhti's friends convinced her to go to the casting of Sheitan, where she was selected for the role of Yasmin, a young beurette. Released on 1 February 2006, Sheitan spent 13 weeks in cinemas, selling around 300,000 tickets.

That same year, she acted opposite Smaïn in Alain Tasma's telefilm Harkis. The film told the story of an Algerian family who suffers persecution by French military forces, despite having fought on their side in the Algerian War. Bekhti was interested in the film's subject as several members of her family, including her grandfather, fought in the ranks of the FLN during the war.

That year, she also played Zarka in Paris, je t'aime (2006) (segment "Quais de Seine", directed by Gurinder Chadha) and Mounia in Mauvaise Foi, playing the sister of Roschdy Zem. On television, she had a small role in an episode of the series Madame le Proviseur and in the series Les Tricheurs alongside Pascal Légitimus.

In 2008 she won a Best Actress Award at the Silhouette Festival for her role in Rachid Hami's Choisir d'aimer. She followed this with Pour l'amour de Dieu, an Arte telefilm by Ahmed Bouchaala and Zakia Tahri. Bekhti starred in Ali Baba alongside Gérard Jugnot and appeared in Des poupées et des anges by Nora Hamdi. For her role as Lya in the film, she was shortlisted for the César Award for Best Actress, although she did not make the final list of nominees.

That same year, two supporting roles helped increase her visibility: one in Mesrine: Killer Instinct by Jean-François Richet, and especially that of Djamila in A Prophet directed by Jacques Audiard. She played the only female role in the latter film, which won nine César Awards and the Grand Prix at Cannes.

Meanwhile, Bekhti returned to television with Conte de la frustration, starring Nicolas Cazalé and Roschdy Zem and a new episode of Tricheurs. She also participated in the web-series Twenty Show, the result of a unique partnership between Arte and MySpace, which was released as a documentary film a year later.

In 2009, besides a third appearance in Tricheurs, she played the role of Myriam in the two-part mini-series Le choix de Myriam, which portrayed the saga of an Algerian family's arrival in France.

After seeing Bekhti's performance in Mauvaise foi, actress Géraldine Nakache offered Bekhti a role in Tout ce qui brille, Nakache's debut film as a director. Released on 24 March 2010, Tout ce qui brille was a critical and commercial success with over 1.3 million tickets sold. Bekhti went on to win a Golden Swan Award at the Cabourg Film Festival and the César Award for Most Promising Actress for her role as Lila.

In 2010 she worked in a wide variety of projects. She worked with Alain Tasma again in the telefilm Vous êtes leur crainte, based on the novel of the same name by Thierry Jonquet. She also appeared in Jean-Luc Perréard's Itinéraire bis, in the musical Toi, moi, les autres... directed by Audrey Estrougo and in Anne De Petrini's debut film Il reste du jambon?.

She starred in the French-Moroccan co-production The Source, which competed at the 2011 Cannes Film Festival.

In 2011 she was signed as the new face of L'Oréal, the cosmetic firm.

In 2016 she played the French police officer Kahina Zadi in the Swedish television series Midnattssol opposite Peter Stormare.

Bekhti was featured in a biopic of Maria Montessori starring Jasmine Trinca; it achieved distribution deals in 2024.

== Personal life ==
Bekhti is married to fellow French-Algerian actor Tahar Rahim, whom she met while filming A Prophet in 2007. They have four children together, a son born in 2017 then a daughter in 2020, with a third child in 2021 and a fourth in March 2024.

In June 2024, along with her husband, Bekhti signed a petition addressed to French President Emmanuel Macron demanding France officially recognize the State of Palestine.

== Filmography ==
Year	Title	Role	Notes
2006	Sheitan	Yasmin	
2006	Madame le proviseur	Djamila Kadi	"Chacun sa chance"
2006	Paris, je t'aime	Zarka	"Quais de Seine" segment
2006	Cheaters (Tricheurs)	Vally	1 episode
2006	Harkis	Leïla	
2006	Pour l'amour de Dieu	Meriem	
2006	Mauvaise foi	Mounia	
2007	Ali Baba et les 40 voleurs	Morgiane	
2008	Choisir d'aimer	Sarah	
2008	Des poupées et des anges	Lya	Nominated—Lumière Award for Most Promising Actress
2008	Mesrine: Killer Instinct	La fille du Fellagah	
2009	La bête		
2009	A Prophet	Djamila	
2010	Tout ce qui brille	Lila	César Award for Most Promising Actress; Nominated—Globes de Cristal Award for Best Actress
2010	Le cose che restano	Alina	
2010	Histoires de vies	Sofia	"Conte de la frustration"
2010	Fracture	Zora	
2010	Bacon on the Side	Anissa Boudaoud	
2010	Toi, moi, les autres	Leïla	
2010	L'Or rouge		
2011	The Source	Leila	Nominated—César Award for Best Actress; Nominated—Globes de Cristal Award for Best Actress
2011	Itinéraire bis	Nora	
2011	Une vie meilleure	Nadia	A better life
2012	Nous York	Samia	
2013	Before the Winter Chill	Lou	
2014	Maintenant ou jamais		
2015	L'Astragale	Albertine Damien	
2015	All Three of Us	Fereshteh	
2016	The Jungle Book	Kaa	French voice
2016	Midnight Sun	Kahina Zadi	Main cast 8 episodes Nominated - ACS Award for Best Actress
2018	Beirut	Nadia	
2018	A Man in a Hurry	Jeanne	
2018	Sink or Swim	Amanda	
2018	La lutte des classes	Sofia Belkacem	
2019	J'irai où tu iras	Mina	
2019	The Bears' Famous Invasion of Sicily	Almerina (voice)	
2019	Perfect Nanny	Myriam	
2020	The Eddy	Amira	Main cast 8 episodes Nominated - ACS Award for Best Actress
2020	La Flamme	Alexandra	Main cast 9 episodes
2021	Comment je suis devenu super-héros	Calista	
2021	The Restless	Leila	
2021	La Vengeance au Triple Galop	Crystal Clear	TV film
2022	Loving Memories	Julie Delaunay	
2023	All Your Faces	Nawelle	
2025	Once Upon My Mother (Ma mère, Dieu et Sylvie Vartan)	Esther Perez	

== Discography ==
=== Singles ===
Year	Single	Peak positions	Notes
Year	Single	FR	Notes
2010	"Chanson sur une drôle de vie" (Géraldine Nakache & Leïla Bekhti)	6	From soundtrack of film Tout ce qui brille. A remake of a Véronique Sanson hit.

== Awards and nominations ==
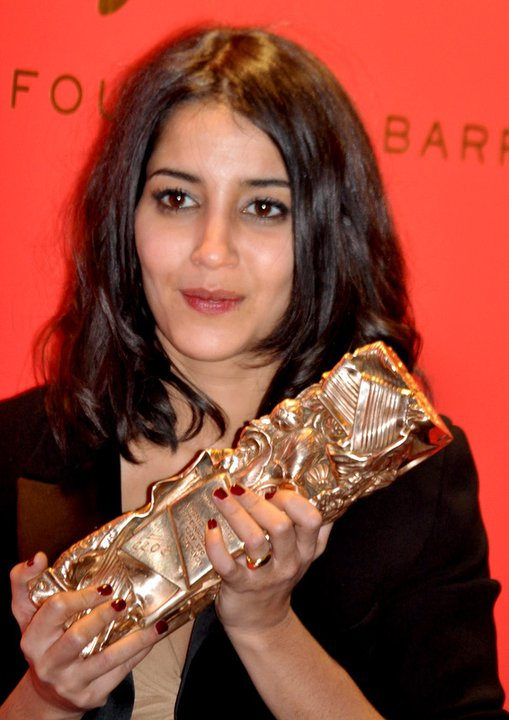
Bekhti with her César Award for Most Promising Actress for Tout ce qui brille.

Year	Award	Category	Nominated work	Result
2008	Silhouette Film Festival	Best Actress Award	Choisir d'aimer	Won
2010	Cabourg Film Festival	Most Promising Actress Award	Tout ce qui brille	Won
2011	César Award	Most Promising Actress	Tout ce qui brille	Won
2011	Golden stars of French cinema	Most Promising Actress	Tout ce qui brille	Won
2011	Globe de Cristal Awards	Best Actress	Tout ce qui brille	Nominated
2012	César Award	Best Actress	The Source	Nominated
2012	Globe de Cristal Awards	Best Actress	The Source	Nominated
2017	Golden Nymph Award	Best Actress in a Dramatic Series	Midnattssol	Nominated
2019	César Award	Best Supporting Actress	Sink or Swim	Nominated
2024	César Award	Best Supporting Actress	All Your Faces	Nominated
2026	César Award	Best Actress	Once Upon My Mother	Nominated

== See also ==
- Maghrebian community of Paris
