= No Love Lost (film) =

2023 comedy drama film

- Promotional poster
- French: La Fille de son père
- Directed by: Erwan De Luc
- Written by: Erwan De Luc
- Produced by: Stéphanie Bermann; Alexis Dulguerian
- Starring: Nahuel Pérez Biscayart; Céleste Brunnquell
- Cinematography: Alexis Kavyrchine
- Edited by: Julie Dupré
- Music by: Julie Roué
- Production company: Domino Films
- Distributed by: Pyramide Distribution
- Release dates: 24 May 2023 (Cannes); 20 December 2023 (France)
- Running time: 91 minutes
- Country: France
- Language: French
- Budget: €2.8 million
- Box office: $579,413

No Love Lost (French: La Fille de son père) is a 2023 French comedy drama film directed and written by Erwan De Luc. It stars Nahuel Pérez Biscayart and Céleste Brunnquell as father and daughter, Étienne and Rosa.

The film had its world premiere at the 2023 Cannes Film Festival during the Critics' Week on 24 May 2023.

== Premise ==
Étienne, a young single father, and his daughter Rosa, must confront their past when they prepare to separate and pursue their own paths in life.

== Cast ==
- Nahuel Pérez Biscayart as Étienne Gravier
- Céleste Brunnquell as Rosa Gravier
- Maud Wyler as Hélène
- Mohammed Louridi as Youssef Horlaville
- Mercedes Dassy as Valérie
- Camille Rutherford as Olive
- Noémie Lvovsky as the mayor
- Nicolas Chupin as Alex, the real estate agent

== Production ==
In 2021, the project was chosen and received production grant from Gan Film Foundation. The principal photography took place between May and July 2022 in Paris, Metz, France, and Nazaré, Portugal.

== Release ==
No Love Lost had its world premiere at the 2023 Cannes Film Festival as the closing film of the Critics' Week on 24 May 2023. During the festival, Playtime handled the film's international sales. The film was released in French cinema on 20 December 2023. On its opening day, the film garnered 7,935 admissions across 120 theatres. It achieved 102,701 admissions during its theatrical run.

== Reception ==
=== Critical reception ===
No Love Lost received an average rating of 3.9 out of 5 stars on the French website AlloCiné, based on 29 reviews.

=== Accolades ===
Brunnquell was nominated for the Best Female Revelation at the 49th César Awards.
