= The Origin of Evil (film) =

2022 film by Sébastien Marnier

- Theatrical release poster
- French: L'Origine du mal
- Directed by: Sébastien Marnier
- Written by: Sébastien Marnier
- Produced by: Caroline Bonmarchand
- Starring: Laure Calamy; Doria Tillier; Dominique Blanc; Jacques Weber; Suzanne Clément; Céleste Brunnquell; Véronique Ruggia Saura
- Cinematography: Romain Carcanade
- Edited by: Valentin Féron; Jean-Baptiste Beaudoin
- Music by: Pierre Lapointe; Philippe Brault
- Production companies: Avenue B Productions; micro_scope; Poison Productions
- Distributed by: The Jokers Films; Les Bookmakers (France); Maison 4:3 (Canada)
- Release dates: 1 September 2022 (Venice); 5 October 2022 (France); 13 January 2023 (Canada)
- Running time: 123 minutes
- Countries: France; Canada
- Language: French
- Budget: €3.5 million
- Box office: $1.2 million

The Origin of Evil (French: L'Origine du mal) is a 2022 thriller drama film written and directed by Sébastien Marnier. It stars Laure Calamy, Doria Tillier, Dominique Blanc, Jacques Weber, Suzanne Clément, Céleste Brunnquell and Véronique Ruggia Saura.

The film premiered at the 79th Venice International Film Festival on 1 September 2022, and had its North American premiere at the 2022 Toronto International Film Festival. It was released theatrically in France on 5 October 2022 by The Jokers Films and Les Bookmakers and in Canada on 13 January 2023 by Maison 4:3.

== Premise ==
Nathalie, a con woman, assumes the identity of her imprisoned girlfriend, Stéphane, who is the biological daughter of wealthy businessman Serge Dumontet, and attempts to fit in with his established family despite their unwillingness to accept her.

== Cast ==
- Laure Calamy as Nathalie Cordier
- Doria Tillier as George Dumontet
- Dominique Blanc as Louise Dumontet
- Jacques Weber as Serge Dumontet
- Suzanne Clément as Stéphane Marson
- Céleste Brunnquell as Jeanne Patterson
- Véronique Ruggia Saura as Agnès
- Clotilde Mollet as the owner
- Naidra Ayadi as Samira

== Production ==
According to Marnier, the film was initially inspired by his own mother's story of having never known her biological father and meeting him only as an adult, but cautioned that the overall film should not be interpreted as a portrait of his own family.

In an interview with Fugues magazine, he noted that he had made the film as a France-Canada co-production because he was interested in working with several figures from Quebec, including musicians Pierre Lapointe and Philippe Brault and sound editor Sylvain Bellemare, who brought a more North American, rather than European, approach to film sound.

== Reception ==
=== Critical response ===
On the review aggregator website Rotten Tomatoes, 93% of 54 critics' reviews are positive. The website's consensus reads: "A slow-burning thriller whose twists are held together by a stellar ensemble, The Origin of Evil confirms writer-director Sébastien Marnier as a talent to watch." On Metacritic, the film has a weighted average score of 68 out of 100 based on 9 critics, which the site labels as "generally favorable" reviews.

The film was compared by critics to both Knives Out and Patricia Highsmith's The Talented Mr. Ripley series.

David Katz of Cineuropa wrote that the film "feels like the sort of movie you might've caught half-asleep on late-night TV in the pre-streaming age, perhaps after having missed the first 15 minutes – forcing you to stay glued until the very end, drooping eyelids be damned. Or, to be less flattering, it feels like the kind of brisk, undemanding, back-of-the-seat entertainment that might make a few hours of a long-haul flight melt away."

For Screen Daily, Allan Hunter wrote that "Marnier's agile screenplay takes us beyond surface appearances to reveal the hidden agendas at play. Propelled by revelations, twists and a seasoning of sly humour, The Origin Of Evil is very watchable, even if some ingredients propel it towards parody. The mention of a secret passage and the rumbles of thunder to signal the coming denouement over egg pudding, not to mention the score by Philippe Brault and Pierre Lapointe, flirt with Victorian melodrama."

=== Accolades ===
The film was the winner of the Audience Award for Narrative Features at the 2023 Frameline Film Festival.
