= For Night Will Come =

- Directed by: Céline Rouzet
- Screenplay by: Céline Rouzet; William Martin
- Produced by: Olivier Aknin; Candice Zaccagnino
- Starring: Mathias Legoût Hammond; Céleste Brunnquell; Élodie Bouchez
- Cinematography: Maxence Lemonnier
- Edited by: Léa Masson
- Music by: Jean-Benoît Dunckel
- Release date: 2023
- Language: French

For Night Will Come (French: En attendant la nuit, lit. 'Waiting for the night') is a 2023 French-Belgian fantasy-horror drama film co-written and directed by Céline Rouzet. It premiered at the 80th edition of the Venice Film Festival.

== Plot ==
In the end of the 90s, Philémon moves in quiet suburbs with his family, hoping to lead a normal life. As he meets his neighbor Camila and falls in love with her, his secret is at risk of being exposed : he needs human blood to survive.

== Cast ==
- Mathias Legoût Hammond as Philémon Féral
- Céleste Brunnquell as Camila Berthier
- Élodie Bouchez as Laurence Féral
- Jean-Charles Clichet as Georges Féral
- Anne Benoît as Hélène Noisy
- Louis Peres as Charles
- Angèle Metzger as Clémence

== Production ==
The film marked the narrative film debut of Céline Rouzet, following her documentary A Distant Thud In The Jungle. It was produced by ElianeAntoinette, Reboot Films and Altitude 100 Production. It was pre-purchased by OCS and Disney +.

== Release ==
The film premiered at the 80th edition of the Venice Film Festival, in the Orizzonti section.

It was released in French cinemas on 5 June 2024.

== Reception ==
On the review aggregator website Rotten Tomatoes, 88% of 8 critics' reviews are positive, with an average rating of 6.3/10. The film has been described as "a Gen Z response to Twilight, featuring no fights but with an emphasis on family dynamics and societal commentary".
