= La Discrète =

- Directed by: Christian Vincent
- Written by: Christian Vincent; Jean-Pierre Ronssin
- Produced by: Alain Rocca
- Starring: Fabrice Luchini; Judith Henry; Maurice Garrel
- Cinematography: Romain Winding
- Edited by: François Ceppi
- Music by: Jay Gottlieb
- Distributed by: Pan-Européenne Distribution
- Release date: 21 November 1990
- Running time: 94 minutes
- Country: France
- Language: French

La Discrète (The Discreet) is a 1990 French comedy-drama film directed by Christian Vincent. It won three César Awards: for Best First Feature Film, Best Original Screenplay or Adaptation and Best Female Newcomer. Set in Paris, it tells the story of an embittered old man who encourages a vain young protégé to seduce an apparently innocent girl as raw material for a novel.

== Plot ==
Antoine, an egocentric would-be writer, is abruptly left by his latest girlfriend Solange for another man. Wounded in his pride, Antoine tells his troubles to the lonely Jean, an elderly publisher and bookseller. Jean proposes that Antoine should get his revenge on Solange by writing a book. He is to pick a woman at random, make her fall in love with him, and then leave her. At the same time, he will keep a detailed journal of the experience, which Jean will publish as a novel. Dubious at first, Antoine agrees to the plan if Jean will define each step he is to take. After putting an ad in the local bakery for a typist, in his favourite café he interviews the demure Catherine, who he finds unattractive. Jean convinces him that this very aspect will make her a good candidate and that he is to progress gently, keeping his distance to see what moves she will make.

When she says she goes swimming every week and invites him to join her, he ridicules the idea. When she suggests a boat trip on the Seine, he is appalled at her provincialism. Following a visit to the cinema together, where he sneers at the film, he takes her to an expensive restaurant. After a couple of large cocktails she says she will be his and, going back to her room, they make love. Antoine tries to go home, but the building is locked for the night. Back in bed with Catherine, she tells him about an affair with her previous employer's husband and how she used to earn extra money in a brothel catering for special tastes.

Feeling that he can no longer go on with the project, Antoine dumps his journal at Jean's office. Furious, Jean gets his revenge by handing it to Catherine as she leaves Paris to go and stay with her parents in the country. She is devastated by the treachery of both men, but has the strength of mind to write Antoine a dignified goodbye letter.

The film ends with Antoine sitting in his favourite café, writing away. An attractive young woman on her own is looking interestedly at him, but he is oblivious.

== Cast ==
- Fabrice Luchini as Antoine
- Judith Henry as Catherine
- Maurice Garrel as Jean
- Marie Bunel as Solange
- François Toumarkine as Manu
- Brice Beaugier as Solange's friend
- Yvette Petit as Baker's wife
- Nicole Félix as Monique
- Olivier Achard as Customer
- Serge Riaboukine as Cafe waiter
- Katia Popova as Girl in cafe
- Amy Laviètes as Ewa
- Hélène Hardouin as Catherine's friend
- Maria Verdi as Woman in restaurant
- Pierre Gérald as Scientist
- Sophie Broustal as Girl in pink

== Background ==
In the late 1980s, Christian Vincent did research on 18th century women's fashion. It was intended for a collective film project for which he was to direct a sketch. In the 18th century, women were wearing little patches, made of a piece of taffeta, to set off the paleness of their skin. Those fake moles, glued to the skin, were known as "mouches."

The project failed to materialize but it gave the filmmaker the idea for his first feature. The film title refers to the nickname that Antoine gives Catherine because of the mole on her chin. As he explains, in the 18th-century fashion code, such mole was called "discreet."

== Production ==
Producer Alain Rocca founded his company, Les Productions Lazennec, as a workshop for young film-school graduates. The first feature film, Love without Pity, that Rocca produced in 1989, was a critical success, and won a César Award for Best First Feature Film. La Discrète was his second project, with the modest budget of 11.24 million francs ($2.2 million). The script was written by Christian Vincent who worked on it for more than a year with co-writer Jean-Pierre Ronssin. The writers were not paid for this work until the film was in production. The leading roles were given to relatively unknown actors: Fabrice Luchini and Judith Henry. The production went rather smoothly, and the film came in under budget. The actual cost was 10.46 million francs ($1.97 million).

== Release ==
The film was released in France on November 21, 1990, sold 1.4 million tickets, and became the 20th most watched film of the year. It didn't do well at the U.S. box-office, where it earned only $100,000 in 1992, and failed to recover even its promotional costs.

== Critical reception ==
The film received wide critical acclaim. The Los Angeles Times said: "Life is not a game, but "La Discrete" is: exquisite, humorous, touching, knowing, beautifully played. The characters may lose, but their audience won't." TV Guide called it "richly ironic, erotic, ephemeral, intellectually provocative and downright earthy," and added that it is "one of those deceptively small films that rocks the soul with its almost offhanded insights into eternal human truths. It's as good as Rohmer's best, with a lot less talk and a much harder edge." In Film Comment critic Molly Haskell named it her favorite film of the year. The Austin Chronicle called it "a wonderful, honest film", and said that Vincent's direction is "so self-assured it's hard to believe this is his first feature film." Time Out said it was a "very Rohmer-esque film", and commented that "the interest lies not so much in the predictable intrigue – it almost reads like a commonplace seduction comedy – as in the treatment of a particularly unpalatable strain of French amorous discourse."

== Awards ==
1991 César Awards:

- Best First Feature Film (Christian Vincent) – Winner
- Best Original Screenplay or Adaptation (Christian Vincent, Jean-Pierre Ronssin) – Winner
- Best Female Newcomer (Judith Henry) – Winner
- Best Actor (Fabrice Luchini) – Nominee
- Best Supporting Actor (Maurice Garrel) – Nominee

1990: Prix Méliès
