= Midnattssol =

Swedish–French police television series

- French: Jour polaire
- Genre: Crime
- Created by: Måns Mårlind; Björn Stein
- Screenplay by: Måns Mårlind
- Directed by: Måns Mårlind; Björn Stein
- Starring: Leïla Bekhti; Gustaf Hammarsten; Göran Forsmark; Richard Ulfsäter; Jessica Grabowsky; Peter Stormare
- Composer: Nathaniel Méchaly
- Country of origin: Sweden/France
- Original languages: English; Swedish; French; Sami; Kven
- No. of seasons: 1
- No. of episodes: 8

Production
- Cinematography: Erik Sohlström
- Editor: Kristofer Nordin
- Running time: 54 min
- Production companies: Atlantique Productions; Nice Drama

Original release
- Network: Sveriges Television
- Release: 13 October – 11 December 2016

Midnattssol (French: Jour polaire, English: midnight sun) is a Swedish-French police procedural series which aired for one season on Sveriges Television on 2016. As Midnight Sun, the series debuted on Australia's SBS on January 12, 2017. Anders Harnesk (Gustaf Hammarsten) and Kahina Zadi (Leïla Bekhti) are the two main protagonists. The pair investigate the death of a French national in far north Sweden, near Kiruna. It is the first in a series of mysterious, ritualistic killings. The town center is being moved as their biggest employer, an iron mining company, has worked from underneath.

== Cast ==
- Leïla Bekhti as Kahina Zadi, a Parisienne police lieutenant in the OCRVP. She travels to Kiruna on secondment for a Frenchman's murder. She was raised in Marseille, but left home at age 15. She has led both local and international violent cases. Her family is from Algeria, and Kahina has a troubled past which is gradually revealed.
- Gustaf Hammarsten as Anders Harnesk, Luleå deputy police prosecutor of mixed Swedish-Sámi ethnic descent. He is divorced and shares custody of their daughter, Jessika. Unbeknownst to his family, he is lovers with Thor, a male pilot.
- Richard Ulfsäter as Thor, a helicopter pilot who assists police investigations, Anders' domestic partner.
- Jessica Grabowsky as Jenny-Ann, a geologist at the mining company. She is heavily pregnant and is disturbed to find that not all of the town's center had to be moved.
- Peter Stormare as Rutger Burlin, the Luleå chief prosecution officer, who dies mysteriously while investigating the initial murders, which leaves Anders in charge.
- Göran Forsmark as Sparen Andersson, the town drunk, berry picker and hermit-fisherman. His son, Johan, was brutally drowned in front of him, ten years earlier.
- Olivier Gourmet as Alain Gruard, agent of the French secret service.
- Maxida Märak as Evelina, Sámi woman who died one year ago.
- Iggy Malmborg as Eddie Geatki, Evelina's brother, who works as a cleaner.
- Albin Grenholm as Kimmo Rauta, Jenny-Ann's husband, a mining foreman, and Sparen's friend.
- Jakob Hultcrantz Hansson as Thorndahl, a local police sergeant. Often reminds Anders of procedural matters.
- Karolina Furberg as Jessika Harnesk, Anders' daughter, staying with him for a month.
- Jeremy Corallo as Nadji, Kahina's long estranged son, who is raised by her mother as her own younger brother. He goes to Paris, and then on to Kiruna, to find out why she left him.
- Oscar Skagerberg as Kristoffer Hanki, a representative of the Sámi community.
- Editha Domingo as Mabée, Sparen's girlfriend from Thailand.

== Episodes ==
No.	Title	Directed by	Written by	Air date	Viewers (million)
1	"1.1"	Måns Mårlind, Björn Stein	Måns Mårlind	October 23, 2016	N/A
A Frenchman, Pierre Carnot, is securely attached to a helicopter's rotor blade, it starts to spin and his head is flung off. The crime scene is 20 km from Kiruna. Chief prosecutor, Rutger Burlin, from Luleå searches the area with local sergeant, Thorndahl, to identify the body. In Paris Lieutenant Kahina Zadi starts two weeks leave when her estranged son, Nadji, arrives at her flat. He was raised as her younger brother, she is shocked and leaves him inside to walk aimlessly outside. Upon Kahina's return Nadji has gone and she accepts a request from her boss, Benoit, to investigate Carnot's murder. She arrives in Kiruna and is taken to the death scene by Rutger aboard a police helicopter piloted by Thor. On their way back she notices a man attacked by wolves. He is Henrik Kambo, the first helicopter's pilot, and is chained nude to rocks in a gully. He is severely mauled and dies on the way back. Rutger is seriously ill and also dies. Jessika throws a mid-summer party under the midnight sun. Anders and Thor are lovers, but Anders hasn't told his daughter.
2	"1.2"	Måns Mårlind, Björn Stein	Måns Mårlind	October 30, 2016	N/A
Kahina studies Carnot's tattoo, she is told that Rutger has died: possibly a stroke or heart failure. Anders Harnesk takes over the murder investigations. Kahina is self-harming: by cutting or piercing. She learnt Nadji visited her flat, again. After meeting the Kiruna police team, she tells Anders of a lead to the Nordic Space Center. They interview a former French engineer, Eric Tardieu, who had worked there. Sparen, the town drunk, steals from a hardware store. Kimmo Rauta, a miner, shows up and pays for the goods. Sparen had sent his money overseas. Kimmo's wife, Jenny-Ann, is a geologist at the mine office. Forensics find that Rutger was poisoned by a combination of two rare herbs. In a flashback we see a pregnant Kahina cared for by her mother. She passes a French Foreign Legion building with Carnot's tattoo as its emblem. Anders sees a note, "Kambo, 20", pinned in a supermarket. Police find more notes, "Carnot, 21" and "Forsberg, 22". Jörgen Forsberg was tortured to death. Seven months later he was stabbed with a Sámi bear spear.
3	"1.3"	Måns Mårlind, Björn Stein	Måns Mårlind	November 6, 2016	N/A
A Sámi wisdom teacher, the Nåjd, is disturbed by an impending event, the Torment. Anders and Kahina study the two herbs and talk to his mother who directs him to the Young Sámi Group. They speak to Kristoffer Hanki, who tells about the Nåjd. They also learn of Kristoffer's former girlfriend, Evelina Geatki who had died, presumed suicide, a year earlier – her body was not recovered. Sparen brings a Thai woman, Mabée, to partner him, proving supportive. Anders talks to the Nåjd: she warns him of her foreboding and tells him the herbs must not be combined. Kimmo is worried about his friend Kambo hasn't been at work and phones his mobile. It rings in the police evidence room. The Nåjd directs Anders to Bangkok Jori, a wannabe shaman who collects plants and substances. Police find a note with "Burlin, 19". Kahina trails Jori across a marshy area and across a fast flowing river but she is captured at rifle point.
4	"1.4"	Måns Mårlind, Björn Stein	Måns Mårlind	November 13, 2016	N/A
Kimmo, and three fellow mine workers, receive an MMS, "Elmén, 18", which is a video of a young man chained to a railway line as a train approaches. An almost incoherent Jori holds Kahina in his tent and, in a ramble, he tells her how he sold the toxic herbs. She disarms and captures him. Mabée asks Sparen about his dead son, Johan, which sparks his temper tantrum. Anders and Kahina look for Marko Hesling, a drug dealer, with links to some of the victims. Jenny Ann receives the "Elmén, 18" video, she fears someone knows of their (unspecified) dark secret and is killing people connected to it. She meets a news reporter and informs him that bids for the town center's move were corrupt. Another Frenchman, Alain Gruard, meets Kahina; he is from an intelligence agency, and demands to be informed of the investigation. Kahina and Thor have sex. Nadji has followed her to Kiruna. She searches Kambo's house, where Kimmo sees her. Kimmo and three miners plot to scare Kahina; they hire Marko to kidnap her, she scratches one as they dump her in a swamp.
5	"1.5"	Måns Mårlind, Björn Stein	Måns Mårlind	November 20, 2016	N/A
Ten years earlier: Sparen is tied to a car front bumper as Carnot drowns Johan in the nearby lake. It is a warning for revealing secrets. Sparen tells his story to Mabée, and is asked to go to the police. Anders' team find a note, "Elmén, 18": they discover an ex-Kiruna miner, Patrik Elmén, was murdered in Stockholm. Kristoffer is having a coffee when the owner verbally abuses ("Lapp trash") his employee, Eddie Geatki. Kristoffer defends Eddie and calls out the anti-Sámi racist. Kahina wakes in a muddy pool and eventually makes her way to the hospital, where Nadji is waiting beside her bed. Kimmo has three scratches on his neck and deliberately scalds himself to disguise it. Kahina explains to Nadji about his birth, why she pretended to be his older sister and left to protect the family's name. In Paris she had tried to forget her son but started to self-harm since the "pain is love." In a supermarket she overhears two kidnappers, but is unable to see them. She chases one, Marko, who eludes her in traffic and is killed. Eddie talks to his sister, Evelina's ghost.
6	"1.6"	Måns Mårlind, Björn Stein	Måns Mårlind	November 27, 2016	N/A
A year earlier: 20+ miners meet beside a rapid flowing river to determine what to do about Evelina – who learnt their secret from Sparen. Rutger and Jörgen convince them that she has to be killed. They all draw matches to see who gets the job, with Jörgen chosen. In the present: Sparen calls another meeting, with the surviving miners, he says they should tell police but only Jenny Ann agrees. Kimmo casts the blame for the revenge murders on the local Sámi population, and urges his fellows to trash the Young Sámi center. Alain reveals that Carnot was a French covert agent. He was sent to Kiruna 14 years earlier to monitor the space center and contacted Tardieu. Kahina tells Nadji to fly back to Paris but he changes his mind and leaves the plane, he is picked up by Alain on the way back. Sparen and Mabée go to the police station but he runs back home. Mabée tells Anders and Kahina that he had got drunk one night and told a young woman (Evelina) a secret about hiding something. Sparen has been killed in a manner similar to skinning a bear.
7	"1.7"	Måns Mårlind, Björn Stein	Måns Mårlind	December 4, 2016	N/A
The Nåjd phones Anders a one-word warning, lihtallan——which means "person who went mad by having too much contact with the dead". Anders responds to Sparen's murder site, while Kahina has divers search for Evelina's body at the miners' meeting site. Eddie sabotages a mine safety shelter and then abducts Jenny-Ann. The divers retrieve Evelina's skull. Thorndahl is sent to Geatki's home where Eddie, encouraged by Evelina's ghost, knocks him out. Jessika and Nadji discuss their situations. Anders tells Kahina he knows of her fling with Thor. Evelina wrote a poem on a wall at her home, Eddie uses it to kill 22 people involved in her murder. Alain searches Sparen's house and is surprised by Mabée, he kills her to keep her quiet. Eddie kidnaps both Jessika and Nadji; he hides them in a well. He suspends Jenny-Ann by her feet from a river walkway; her head periodically dips into the water. Anders and Kahina find Eddie's hidden room and evidence of his killings. The 22 helped hide dirty French uranium in the mine: they were paid by Carnot with Rutger as legal advisor and Jörgen as organiser. Eddie sends a photo of Jessika and Nadji, to warn them off.
8	"1.8"	Måns Mårlind, Björn Stein	Måns Mårlind	December 11, 2016	N/A
Eddie starts a fire in a lower mine level, he's rigged water pumps to fail, thereby flooding it. With alarms sounding the crew, including Kimmo and Eddie, evacuate into the sabotaged shelter. They're the remaining 14 miners who conspired to kill Evelina. The Nåjd and her brother rescue Jenny-Ann, who goes into labor. Alain tells the investigators he'll find the kidnapped teens: he's planted a tracer on Nadji. The trapped miners learn the pumps failed but they'll be safe in the shelter. Alain finds the teens at the bottom of the well and records them to get Anders and Kahina to cooperate. He wants the killer's name and have the investigation classified so no French collusion is revealed. The sabotaged shelter floods with the 14 miners and Eddie. Alain plays the recording for Anders, who is fooled into believing the teens are free. Kahina is down in the pump station and helps restart them, but it is too late: they've all drowned. Later Anders frees the teens and Kahina blackmails Alain into organizing a clean up of dirty uranium.
