= April in Love =

- Film poster
- Directed by: Gérald Hustache-Mathieu
- Written by: Gérald Hustache-Mathieu
- Starring: Sophie Quinton; Miou-Miou
- Distributed by: Agora Films; Haut et Court
- Release date: 14 June 2006
- Running time: 96 minutes
- Country: France
- Language: French
- Budget: $1.6 million
- Box office: $880.000

April in Love (French: Avril) is a 2006 French drama film directed by Gérald Hustache-Mathieu, starring Sophie Quinton, Miou-Miou, Nicolas Duvauchelle, Clément Sibony and Richaud Valls.

== Synopsis ==
Avril is a novice in a remote convent, pushed towards taking her vows, although the Sister Bernadette is reluctant to see her do so. Bernadette manages to let Avril know that she has a twin brother. Avril goes on a quest for him, helped by Pierre, whom she meets when her bicycle has a puncture. They find her brother David, and staying with him and his boy-friend in the Camargue, she slowly realizes that she will not go through with her confirmation, and their return to the convent is the climax of her journey.

== Cast ==
- Sophie Quinton - Avril
- Miou-Miou - Sister Bernadette
- Nicolas Duvauchelle - Pierre
- Clément Sibony - David
- Richaud Valls - Jim
- Geneviève Casile - Mother Marie-Joseph
- Monique Mélinand - Sister Céleste
- Anna Mihalcea : Flora
- Claude Duty : Father Jean Diard
- Mathilde Mignot : Avril as a child
- Frédéric Quiring : David's adoptive father
- Marie Vinoy : David's adoptive mother
- Milo Hustache-Mathieu : David as a child

== Production background ==
It was filmed in 35 mm, with Super 8 for the scenes of David as a child with his new parents (which were the first scenes to be shot, on 20 May 2005). The scenes in Normandy were filmed in and around a former Dominican convent, and a convent in Franche-Comté was another location. Filming ended on 23 July, with editing from September to November. Sound mixing took place in January and March 2006; the director commented that the "choice of atmospheres, the sound of the waves and the winds are all part of the film’s writing, just as much as the script. They are primarily there at the service of plausibility. In some respects, the film's story is so 'improbable' that it needs realism even more than another. In my opinion, it participates just as much in 'belief', to the fact that nothing can be doubted anymore". Lumiere records around 130,000 cinema entries in France for the film in 2006. This was the third film for Sophie Quinton with the director, having appeared in his short Peau de vache in 2002 and the 48-minute film La Chatte andalouse in 2003.

== Songs used in the film ==
- Aline, sung by Christophe; and by Quinton, Duvauchelle, Sibony and Valls
- Goodbye je reviendrai, by Christophe
- Tell Me Who's the Girl, sung by Annette Funicello
- Three Guesses, sung by Linda Scott
- Let's Twist Again, sung by Annette Funicello
- Darkwood VII — New Morning, by David Darling
- Luna de abril, sung by María Dolores Pradera
