= All That Glitters (2010 film) =

- Theatrical release poster
- Directed by: Géraldine Nakache; Hervé Mimran
- Written by: Géraldine Nakache; Hervé Mimran
- Produced by: Aïssa Djabri; Farid Lahouassa
- Starring: Géraldine Nakache; Leïla Bekhti; Virginie Ledoyen; Audrey Lamy
- Cinematography: Guillaume Deffontaines
- Edited by: Scott Stevenson
- Music by: Jean-Philippe Verdin
- Production companies: Vertigo Productions; M6 Films; Bethsabée Mucho; Pathé
- Distributed by: Pathé
- Release dates: 9 January 2010 (L'Alpe-d'Huez Film Festival); 24 March 2010 (France)
- Running time: 100 minutes
- Country: France
- Language: French
- Budget: $6.6 million
- Box office: $21.8 million

All That Glitters (French: Tout ce qui brille) is a 2010 French film and the debut feature film for Géraldine Nakache and Hervé Mimran, who co-wrote and co-directed the film. It was filmed in Puteaux, La Défense, and Paris, notably the 16th arrondissement.

Originally, Tout ce qui brille was a 2007 short film shot by the same directors.

== Plot ==
Ely (Géraldine Nakache) and Lila (Leïla Bekhti) are two working class girls and best friends who dream of a glitzier, more glamorous lifestyle. They sneak into a nightclub where they meet Agathe (Virginie Ledoyen) and Joan (Linh Dan Pham) a rich, lesbian couple who give them a ride home. Lila, wanting to appear to be at the same social level as the girls, lies about where she and Ely live, giving the couple the address of a nice building in a wealthy neighborhood.

Lila continues to lie herself into the life of Agathe and Joan, and her new boyfriend Maxx (Simon Buret), while Ely feels more and more left out as she realizes that Lila is spending all her time partying with her new crowd, having been accepted as one of them, while Ely is nothing to Agathe and Joan but an inexpensive babysitter for their son. Eventually she grows sick of Lila's lies and reveals their true identity to Maxx. Lila, terrified at the thought of being rejected by her new friends, becomes furious at Ely. The two girls argue and stop talking. As Lila's lies begin to crumble around her, she realizes that Agathe and her social circle are not really her friends and that by working hard Ely is slowly achieving what she dreamed of. She gets a real job working at an upscale shoe store and eventually succeeds in reconnecting with Ely.

== Cast ==
- Géraldine Nakache as Ely Wapler
- Leïla Bekhti as Lila Belaifa
- Virginie Ledoyen as Agathe
- Linh Dan Pham as Joan, Agathe's partner
- Audrey Lamy as Carole, Ely and Lila's friend
- Manu Payet as Éric, Lila's fiancé
- Simon Buret as Maxx,
- Daniel Cohen as Maurice, Ely's father
- Nanou Garcia as Danielle, Ely's mother
- Ary Abittan as Lila's father
- Sabrina Ouazani as Sandra, Lila's colleague
- Fejria Deliba as Nadia, Lila's mother
- Lucie Bourdeu as Annah, Ely's younger sister
- Nader Boussandel as Slim, Ely's neighbor
- Jeanne Ferron as Mme Houbloup, gossip lady in the building
- Alexandre Gars as Elvis, Agathe's son
- Maria Ducceshi as Jil

== Awards and nominations ==
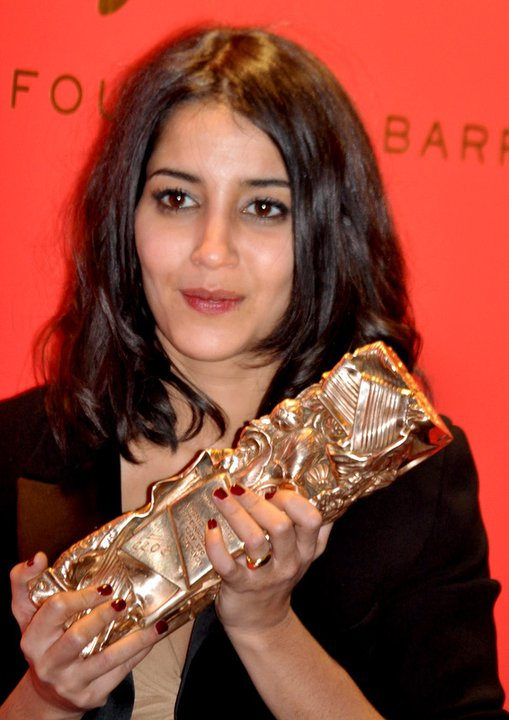
Leïla Bekhti celebrating her César win

Awards won

- 2010: Special jury award and European Public Award at Festival international du film de comédie de l'Alpe d'Huez
- 2011: Most Promising Actress for Leïla Bekhti at 36th César Awards
- 2011: Étoiles d'or du cinéma français (Gold Star of French Cinema) for:
  - Best Debut Film for Géraldine Nakache and Hervé Mimran
  - Feminin Revelation of the Year for Leïla Bekhti

Nominations

- 2011: César for Best Debut Film for Géraldine Nakache et Hervé Mimran at 36th César Awards
- 2011: César for Best Femini Hope (newcomer) for Audrey Lamy

== Soundtrack ==
The soundtrack of the film has proven popular particularly the song "Chanson sur une drôle de vie" sung by appearing in SNEP official French Singles Chart. It is a remake of a previous Véronique Sanson hit. The soundtrack also featured the song Fit But You Know It by The Streets.

| Year | Single | Peak positions | Notes |
| Year | Single | FR | Notes |
|---|---|---|---|
| 2010 | "Chanson sur une drôle de vie" (Géraldine Nakache & Leïla Bekhti) | 6 | From soundtrack |
