= Dear Prudence (2010 film) =

- Film poster
- French: Belle Épine
- Directed by: Rebecca Zlotowski
- Written by: Rebecca Zlotowski; Gaëlle Macé
- Produced by: Frédéric Jouve
- Starring: Léa Seydoux; Anaïs Demoustier; Agathe Schlenker; Johan Libéreau; Guillaume Gouix
- Cinematography: Georges Lechaptois
- Edited by: Julien Lacheray
- Music by: Robin Coudert
- Production companies: Les Films Velvet; Moby Dick Films
- Distributed by: Pyramide Distribution
- Release dates: 14 May 2010 (Cannes); 10 November 2010 (France)
- Running time: 80 minutes
- Country: France
- Language: French
- Budget: €1.5 million
- Box office: $170,000

Dear Prudence (French: Belle Épine; lit. 'Beautiful thorn') is a 2010 French drama film and the directorial debut of Rebecca Zlotowski. The film stars Léa Seydoux, Anaïs Demoustier, Agathe Schlenker, Johan Libéreau and Guillaume Gouix. It premiered in the Critics' Week section at the 2010 Cannes Film Festival. It won the Louis Delluc Prize for Best First Film in 2010. It was also nominated for a César Award in the category of Most Promising Actress for Léa Seydoux in 2011.

== Plot ==
The nearly 17-year-old Prudence Friedman (Léa Seydoux) is struggling to cope with her mother's death and her father, similarly upset, has now been in Canada much longer than the 48 hours it should've taken to settle his client's inheritance. Over the phone, Prudence keeps up the pretence that she and her sister are living together in the family apartment but, in reality, Frédérique has moved out, unable to handle the painful memories of their mother's death there.

The film opens with Prudence and Marilyne Santamaria (Agathe Schlencker) – a girl who goes to the same school as Prudence but doesn't know her well – being strip-searched by mall security. Prudence manages to get away with a bracelet by hiding it in her underwear. When the girls are released, Prudence watches from behind cover as Marilyne rides off with a group of bikers.

The next day, Prudence finds Marilyne in the mall and trails her to a diner. After Marilyne casually confronts her, Prudence invites the girl back to her apartment. Marilyne enjoys having the run of the apartment, eating the food, messing with the Friedman parents' possessions and putting her feet, in their worn red heels, all over the furniture. The girls make a deal: Prudence will give Marilyne a key if Marilyne takes her to see the notorious bike races on the Rungis.

The pair's plans to go to the Rungis are ruined when Frédérique shows up to take Prudence to a dinner with their Jewish extended family, the Cohens. Throughout dinner, Prudence remains quietly agitated, listening distractedly as her effeminate cousin Daniel argues with his devout father, Michel. Later that night, she convinces her cousin Sonia (Anaïs Demoustier) to sneak out with her. Scared of her father's reaction, Sonia gets off the bus before it reaches the Rungis, leaving Prudence to go on alone and meet up with Marilyne. At the Rungis, she eyes Reynald Coste – a biker she heard on the radio – and his gang with great interest. Marilyne and her boyfriend spend the night at Prudence's place and the next morning Marilyne reveals to Prudence that she lost her virginity last night.

Prudence, eager for more thrills, decides to hold a party at her apartment later that week. Sonia lets her cousin dye her hair in preparation for the night but Prudence accidentally makes it overly blonde. Already disgruntled about the hair, Sonia ends up leaving the party early after she's aggressively hit on by a strange biker and sees Prudence sitting idly by while Marilyne dresses her male friends in Prudence's dead mother's clothes for a laugh.

Prudence, wearing her mother's perfume and the red heels she borrowed from Marilyne, flirts and makes out with Reynald and she goes for a night-time bike ride with him and his two friends, Gerard and Franck. Come the morning, the four of them find themselves by a wintery beach. Franck lends Prudence his scarf before joining the other men for a swim. Prudence finds an angry Frédérique waiting for her when she returns home but the two, rather than arguing, end up bonding over the loss of their mother.

At the mall, Prudence snaps at her cousin Sonia for calling Frédérique the previous night. Sonia responds by telling her that she does not want to be friends anymore and that Prudence is "boring" now. Upset, Prudence sees one of Reynald's gang, Franck, being measured for a suit and gets the idea to go visit him at his workplace later under the pretence of returning his scarf. The two nearly have sex on the factory floor but Franck gets self-conscious and they instead agree to go to a concert in the evening.

With even Marilyne too busy to keep up with Prudence's nightly partying, Prudence and Franck go to the concert without her. They end up having sex at Franck's place and, in the morning, Prudence wakes up to find that he's already left for work. She gets dressed and stumbles across Franck's kindly mother, Delphine, in the kitchen.

At the cinema in the evening, Prudence tries to bail on the group without explanation and Franck finally tires of her strange behaviour. She waits outside in the rain but when the others come out after the film finishes, Marilyne ignores her and Franck tries to spite her by spontaneously inviting another girl to ride with him. Prudence makes her own way to the Rungis but, when she gets there, finds that there's been an accident. Franck has crashed, killing the girl riding with him. Maryline, Franck and his mother, Delphine, all watch as the girl's body is taken away.

Back at the apartment, Prudence breaks down and imagines a conversation with her mother. She apologises for not calling 911 sooner after her mother suddenly fell ill. Returning to reality, she puts in her mother's hearing aid and stands on the balcony, crying as sirens sound in the distance and the sun comes out from behind the clouds.

== Cast ==
- Léa Seydoux as Prudence Friedmann
- Anaïs Demoustier as Sonia Cohen
- Johan Libéreau as Franck
- Guillaume Gouix as Reynald
- Michaël Abiteboul as Gérard
- Anna Sigalevitch as Frédérique Friedmann
- Agathe Schlencker as Marilyne Santamaria
- Marie Matheron as Delphine
- Marina Tomé as Nelly Cohen
- Carlo Brandt as Michel Cohen
- Nicolas Maury as Daniel Cohen
- Swann Arlaud as Jean-Pierre
- Sébastien Haddouk as Sébastien
- Valérie Schlumberger as Arlette Friedmann
- Samir Mecheri as Samir

== Soundtrack ==
American Indie pop singer Jeremy Jay recorded "Prudence", a song in French for the movie.
