= Adélaïde Leroux =

French actress (born 1982)

- Born: 30 December 1982 (age 42); Hazebrouck, France
- Education: Université Lille III
- Occupation: Actress
- Years active: 2006–present

Adélaïde Leroux (born 30 December 1982) is a French actress, best known for her role in the 2006 film Flanders. She also played prominent roles in a number of other films, including Martin Provost's Séraphine (2008), Ursula Meier's Home (2008), and Andrew Kötting's Ivul (2009), and has appeared in numerous short films and stage roles.

== Early life and career ==
Leroux was born in Hazebrouck, in northern France, in 1982. Her father was a laborer, and her mother was a waitress. Having developed a fascination with cinema while young, she began attending lectures at Marguerite Yourcenar park near her hometown at age 13, and began taking classes at the Espace Culturel Robert Hossain in Merville. After graduating from Louis Blaringhem High School in Béthune, she enrolled in Université Lille III in Lille, from which she would obtain a performing arts degree. While in college, she played lead roles in plays such as Henrik Ibsen's Hedda Gabler and Anton Chekhov's The Seagull.

While still enrolled at Lille 3, Leroux met director Bruno Dumont, who recruited her for his 2006 film, Flanders. Leroux played the role of "Barbe," an emotionally unstable woman whose boyfriend is called up for military service. She later recalled investing heavily in this role, driven in part by Dumont's perfectionism. Leroux accompanied Dumont and co-star Samuel Boidin to the 59th Cannes Film Festival, where Flanders won the festival's Grand Prize.

Following the success of Flanders, Leroux played "Minouche," a supporting role in the Martin Provost film, Séraphine. In Ursula Meier's 2008 film Home, Leroux plays "Judith," the rebellious, hedonistic eldest child in an increasingly neurotic family. She played the role of "Freya" in experimental director Andrew Kötting's film, Ivul, a role she described as challenging, but "poetic."

In 2009, Leroux appeared on the Montparnasse theatre circuit, playing the title role in Marguerite Duras's play, Agatha, which was performed at the Funambules Theater. In 2010, she played the lead role, "Jeannette," in the made-for-television movie, Cigarettes and Nylons, which was directed by Fabrice Cazeneuve. For this role, she received a prize for most promising young actress at the 2010 La Rochelle TV Film Festival. Leroux played the role of "Sarah" in the Nolwenn Lemesle film, Pieces of Me, which premiered in February 2013. She played the lead role of Aurélie in Frédéric Pelle' 2015 film, Le chant du merle ("Song of the Blackbird").

== Filmography ==
=== Feature films ===
- 2006: Flanders: Barbe
- 2008: Séraphine: Minouche
- 2008: Home: Judith
- 2009: Ivul: Freya
- 2010: Living on Love Alone (D'amour et d'eau fraîche): Laure
- 2010: Cigarettes and Nylons (Cigarettes et bas nylons): Jeannette (TV)
- 2012: Pieces of Me (Des morceaux de moi): Sarah
- 2015: Le chant du merle (Aurélie)

=== Shorts ===
- 2009: Montparnasse: Florence
- 2009: Reproduction: Mathilde
- 2009: Stranded (Le naufragé): Julie
- 2011: The Tragedy of Michel (La Tragédie de Michel): Copine Michel
- 2011: The Day When Raïner's Son Drowned (Le jour où le fils de Raïner s'est noyé): the young woman
- 2011: On the Touchline (La ligne de touche): Victoria
- 2012: Lupa
- 2012: 9m²
- 2013: Sand (La femme)
- 2014: Poisson
