= Living on Love Alone =

- Film poster
- French: D'amour et d'eau fraîche
- Directed by: Isabelle Czajka
- Written by: Isabelle Czajka
- Produced by: Patrick Sobelman
- Starring: Anaïs Demoustier; Pio Marmaï
- Cinematography: Crystel Fournier
- Edited by: Isabelle Manquillet
- Music by: Éric Neveux
- Production companies: Agat Films & Cie; France 3 Cinéma; Pickpocket Productions
- Distributed by: BAC Films
- Release date: 18 August 2010
- Running time: 85 minutes
- Country: France
- Language: French
- Budget: €1.6 million
- Box office: $127,722

Living on Love Alone (French: D'amour et d'eau fraîche; lit. 'Love and fresh water') is a 2010 French drama film written and directed by Isabelle Czajka.

== Cast ==
- Anaïs Demoustier as Julie Bataille
- Pio Marmaï as Ben
- Laurent Poitrenaux as Bernard
- Jean-Louis Coulloc'h as Jean
- Christine Brücher as Coco
- Manuel Vallade as Mathieu
- Adélaïde Leroux as Laure
- Océane Mozas as Diane
- Armonie Sanders as Charlotte
- Jennifer Decker as Laura
- Gregory Herpe as Customs Officer

== Accolades ==
The film received two nominations at the 36th César Awards, including Most Promising Actress for Anaïs Demoustier and Most Promising Actor for Pio Marmaï.
