= The Dazzled =

- French: Les Éblouis
- Directed by: Sarah Suco
- Written by: Sarah Suco; Nicolas Silhol
- Produced by: Dominique Besnehard; Michel Feller; Antoine Le Carpentier
- Starring: Camille Cottin; Jean-Pierre Darroussin; Eric Caravaca; Céleste Brunnquell
- Release date: 23 February 2019
- Running time: 99 min
- Country: France
- Language: French
- Budget: $3.8 million
- Box office: $1.4 million

The Dazzled (French: Les Éblouis) is a 2019 French film directed by Sarah Suco.

== Cast ==
- Camille Cottin : Christine Lourmel
- Jean-Pierre Darroussin : le Berger
- Éric Caravaca : Frédéric Lourmel
- Céleste Brunnquell : Camille Lourmel
- Laurence Roy : Mamie
- Daniel Martin : Papi
- Spencer Bogaert : Boris

== Reception ==
The film was critically praised by critics.
