= Flanders (film) =

- Theatrical release poster
- Flandres
- Directed by: Bruno Dumont
- Written by: Bruno Dumont
- Starring: Samuel Boidin; Adélaïde Leroux
- Production companies: 3B Productions; Arte France
- Distributed by: Tadrart Films
- Release dates: 23 May 2006 (Cannes Film Festival); 30 August 2006 (France)
- Running time: 91 minutes
- Country: France
- Language: French

Flanders (French: Flandres) is a 2006 French drama film, written and directed by Bruno Dumont. It tells the story of André Demester, a man whose girlfriend betrays him out of frustration with his lack of emotion. He is then sent to fight in an unnamed Middle Eastern country, where he experiences (and participates in) the horrors of war.

== Plot ==
Running a dilapidated farm, the taciturn André leads a hard and lonely life, enlivened only by visits from Barbe, a neighbour's young daughter with whom he has quick couplings in a copse. Resenting André's lack of affection, she picks up Blondel in a bar where they are drinking and has noisy sex outside in his car. Both men are called up to fight in a Middle Eastern country, leaving Barbe pregnant.

André and Blondel's platoon go on a long patrol in the bare mountains, shooting men and children and raping a woman. They are captured by insurgents, who emasculate the rapist before shooting him and execute most of the rest. Only André and Blondel are left when a helicopter arrives overhead and the two seize the chance to flee. When Blondel is hit in the leg, André runs on alone.

Barbe meanwhile has undergone an abortion and, falling into depression, been confined in a psychiatric hospital. She is released when a traumatised André returns to run his farm. Though they have passionless sex in their old meeting place, he cannot open up to her about the horror of his experiences and his abandonment of the wounded Blondel. She gets a girl friend to try and draw out André's feelings and, after they talk, he is able to cry over the victims on both sides. Next time Barbe comes round, he confesses that he loves her and she responds.

== Cast ==
- Adélaïde Leroux as Barbe
- Samuel Boidin as André Demester
- Henri Cretel as Blondel
- Jean-Marie Bruveart as Briche
- David Poulain as Leclercq
- Patrice Venant as Mordac
- David Legay as Lieutenant
- Inge Decaesteker as France

== Reception ==
The film holds a 66% approval rating on review aggregator Rotten Tomatoes, with an average rating of 6.1/10. The website's critical consensus reads "Though Bruno Dumont recycles his typical themes and motifs, Flanders is also just as beautifully shot and convincingly acted as the director's previous movies." On Metacritic it has a score of 67 out of 100. Michael Phillips wrote for the Chicago Tribune "The harsh and lovely achievement of Bruno Dumont's Flanders is its mixture of the concrete and the abstract. It isn't about a specific war. It's about conflict of every stripe, in any time".

== Awards ==
The film won the Grand Prix at the 2006 Cannes Film Festival.
