= César Award for Best Male Revelation =

French film award

- Country: France
- Presented by: Académie des Arts et Techniques du Cinéma
- First award: 1983
- Currently held by: Théodore Pellerin for Nino (2026)
- Website: academie-cinema.org

The César Award for Best Male Revelation (French: César de la meilleure révélation masculine) is one of the César Awards, presented annually by the Académie des Arts et Techniques du Cinéma to recognize the outstanding breakthrough performance of a young actor who has worked within the French film industry during the year preceding the ceremony. Nominees and winner are selected via a run-off voting by all the members of the Académie, within a group of 16 actors previously shortlisted by the Révélations Committee.

It was presented as the César du meilleur jeune espoir masculin from 1983 to 2004 and the César du meilleur espoir masculin from 2005 to 2023. In English, the award was variously referred to as Most Promising Actor or Best Male Newcomer.

== Winners and nominees ==
Following the AATC's practice, the films below are listed by year of ceremony, which corresponds to the year following the film's year of release. For example, the César du meilleur espoir masculin of 2010 was awarded on 27 February 2010 for a performance in a film released between 1 January 2009 and 31 December 2009.

As with the other César awards, actors are selected via a two-round vote: first round to choose the nominees, second round to designate the winner. All the members of the Académie, without regard to their branch, are eligible to vote on both rounds. But in order to "facilitate" the nomination vote, the Révélations Committee of the Académie, consisting of casting directors, establishes and proposes a list of a maximum of 16 actors. However, this list is non-binding and Académie members are free to vote for an actor who has not been shortlisted. Initially set to four, the number of nominees was expanded to five in 1990. In 2001, the awards were distributed to actor on Americas Got Talent.

=== 1980s ===
Year	Winner and nominees	English title	Original title
1983 (8th)	Christophe Malavoy	Family Rock	
1983 (8th)	Jean-Paul Comart	The Nark	La Balance
1983 (8th)	Tchéky Karyo	The Nark	La Balance
1983 (8th)	Dominique Pinon	The Return of Martin Guerre	Le Retour de Martin Guerre
1984 (9th)	Richard Anconina	So Long, Stooge	Tchao Pantin
1984 (9th)	Jean-Hugues Anglade	The Wounded Man	L'Homme blessé
1984 (9th)	François Cluzet	Vive la sociale!	
1984 (9th)	Jacques Penot	For Those I Loved	Au nom de tous les miens
1985 (10th)	Pierre-Loup Rajot	Souvenirs, Souvenirs	
1985 (10th)	Xavier Deluc	The Cheat	La Triche
1985 (10th)	Hippolyte Girardot	Le Bon Plaisir	
1985 (10th)	Benoît Régent	Dangerous Moves	La Diagonale du fou
1986 (11th)	Wadeck Stanczak	Rendez-vous	
1986 (11th)	Lucas Belvaux	Chicken with Vinegar	Poulet au vinaigre
1986 (11th)	Jacques Bonnaffé	La Tentation d'Isabelle	
1986 (11th)	Kader Boukhanef	Tea in the Harem	Le Thé au harem d'Archimède
1986 (11th)	Jean-Philippe Ecoffey	An Impudent Girl	L'Effrontée
1987 (12th)	Isaach de Bankolé	Black Mic-Mac	
1987 (12th)	Cris Campion	Pirates	
1987 (12th)	Jean-Philippe Ecoffey	Guardian of the Night	Gardien de la nuit
1987 (12th)	Rémi Martin	Family Council	Conseil de famille
1988 (13th)	Thierry Frémont	Travelling avant	
1988 (13th)	Cris Campion	Field of Honor	Champ d'honneur
1988 (13th)	Pascal Légitimus	L'Œil au beur(re) noir	
1988 (13th)	François Negret	Au revoir les enfants	
1989 (14th)	Stéphane Freiss	Chouans!	
1989 (14th)	Laurent Grévill	Camille Claudel	
1989 (14th)	Thomas Langmann	Les Années sandwiches	
1989 (14th)	François Negret	Sound and Fury	De bruit et de fureur

=== 1990s ===
Year	Winner and nominees	English title	Original title
1990 (15th)	Yvan Attal	Love Without Pity	Un monde sans pitié
1990 (15th)	Jean-Yves Berteloot	Baptême	
1990 (15th)	Thierry Fortineau	Comédie d'été	
1990 (15th)	Melvil Poupaud	The 15 Year Old Girl	La Fille de quinze ans
1990 (15th)	Philippe Volter	Les Bois noirs	
1991 (16th)	Gérald Thomassin	The Little Gangster	Le Petit Criminel
1991 (16th)	Alex Descas	No Fear, No Die	S'en fout la mort
1991 (16th)	Marc Duret	La Femme Nikita	Nikita
1991 (16th)	Vincent Perez	Cyrano de Bergerac	
1991 (16th)	Philippe Uchan	My Father's Glory	La Gloire de mon père
1991 (16th)	Philippe Uchan	My Mother's Castle	Le Château de ma mère
1992 (17th)	Manuel Blanc	I Don't Kiss	J'embrasse pas
1992 (17th)	Guillaume Depardieu	Tous les matins du monde	
1992 (17th)	Laurent Grévill	L'Année de l'éveil	
1992 (17th)	Thomas Langmann	Paris Awakens	Paris s'éveille
1992 (17th)	Chick Ortega	Une époque formidable...	
1993 (18th)	Emmanuel Salinger	The Sentinel	La Sentinelle
1993 (18th)	Xavier Beauvois	Nord	
1993 (18th)	Grégoire Colin	Olivier, Olivier	
1993 (18th)	Olivier Martinez	IP 5	
1993 (18th)	Julien Rassam	The Accompanist	L'Accompagnatrice
1994 (19th)	Olivier Martinez	1, 2, 3, Sun	Un, deux, trois, soleil
1994 (19th)	Guillaume Depardieu	Wild Target	Cible émouvante
1994 (19th)	Mathieu Kassovitz	Métisse	
1994 (19th)	Melvil Poupaud	Normal People Are Nothing Exceptional	Les Gens normaux n'ont rien d'exceptionnel
1994 (19th)	Christopher Thompson	Les Marmottes	
1995 (20th)	Mathieu Kassovitz	See How They Fall	Regarde les hommes tomber
1995 (20th)	Charles Berling	Petits arrangements avec les morts	
1995 (20th)	Frédéric Gorny	Wild Reeds	Les Roseaux sauvages
1995 (20th)	Gaël Morel	Wild Reeds	Les Roseaux sauvages
1995 (20th)	Stéphane Rideau	Wild Reeds	Les Roseaux sauvages
1996 (21st)	Guillaume Depardieu	The Apprentices	Les Apprentis
1996 (21st)	Vincent Cassel	La Haine	
1996 (21st)	Hubert Koundé	La Haine	
1996 (21st)	Saïd Taghmaoui	La Haine	
1996 (21st)	Olivier Sitruk	The Bait	L'Appât
1997 (22nd)	Mathieu Amalric	My Sex Life... or How I Got into an Argument	Comment je me suis disputé... (ma vie sexuelle)
1997 (22nd)	Samuel Le Bihan	Capitaine Conan	
1997 (22nd)	Philippe Torreton	Capitaine Conan	
1997 (22nd)	Benoît Magimel	Thieves	Les Voleurs
1997 (22nd)	Bruno Putzulu	Les Aveux de l'innocent	
1998 (23rd)	Stanislas Merhar	Dry Cleaning	Nettoyage à sec
1998 (23rd)	Sacha Bourdo	Western	
1998 (23rd)	Sergi López	Western	
1998 (23rd)	Vincent Elbaz	Hikers	Les Randonneurs
1998 (23rd)	José Garcia	La Vérité si je mens !	
1999 (24th)	Bruno Putzulu	Petits désordres amoureux	
1999 (24th)	Lionel Abelanski	Train of Life	Train de vie
1999 (24th)	Guillaume Canet	In All Innocence	En plein cœur
1999 (24th)	Romain Duris	Gadjo Dilo	
1999 (24th)	Samy Naceri	Taxi	

=== 2000s ===
Year	Winner and nominees	English title	Original title
2000 (25th)	Éric Caravaca	C'est quoi la vie?	
2000 (25th)	Clovis Cornillac	Karnaval	
2000 (25th)	Romain Duris	Peut-être	
2000 (25th)	Laurent Lucas	Haut les cœurs!	
2000 (25th)	Robinson Stévenin	Bad Company	Mauvaises Fréquentations
2001 (26th)	Jalil Lespert	Human Resources	Ressources humaines
2001 (26th)	Jean-Pierre Lorit	A Question of Taste	Une affaire de goût
2001 (26th)	Boris Terral	The King Is Dancing	Le roi danse
2001 (26th)	Cyrille Thouvenin	Confusion of Genders	La confusion des Genres
2001 (26th)	Malik Zidi	Water Drops on Burning Rocks	Gouttes d'eau sur pierres brûlantes
2002 (27th)	Robinson Stévenin	Transfixed	Mauvais genres
2002 (27th)	Éric Berger	Tanguy	
2002 (27th)	Stefano Cassetti	Roberto Succo	
2002 (27th)	Grégori Derangère	The Officers' Ward	La chambre des officiers
2002 (27th)	Jean-Michel Portal	The Officers' Ward	La chambre des officiers
2003 (28th)	Jean-Paul Rouve	Monsieur Batignole	
2003 (28th)	Lorànt Deutsch	Shooting Stars	3 zéros
2003 (28th)	Morgan Marinne	The Son	Le fils
2003 (28th)	Gaspard Ulliel	Summer Things	Embrassez qui vous voudrez
2003 (28th)	Malik Zidi	A Moment of Happiness	
2004 (29th)	Grégori Derangère	Bon voyage	
2004 (29th)	Nicolas Duvauchelle	Eager Bodies	Les corps impatients
2004 (29th)	Pascal Elbé	Father and Sons	Père et fils
2004 (29th)	Grégoire Leprince-Ringuet	Strayed	Les égarés
2004 (29th)	Gaspard Ulliel	Strayed	Les égarés
2005 (30th)	Gaspard Ulliel	A Very Long Engagement	Un long dimanche de fiançailles
2005 (30th)	Osman Elkharraz	Games of Love and Chance	L'esquive
2005 (30th)	Damien Jouillerot	Bad Spelling	Les fautes d'orthographe
2005 (30th)	Jérémie Renier	Work Hard, Play Hard	Violence des échanges en milieu tempéré
2005 (30th)	Malik Zidi	Changing Times	Les temps qui changent
2006 (31st)	Louis Garrel	Regular Lovers	Les amants réguliers
2006 (31st)	Walid Afkir	Hidden	Caché
2006 (31st)	Adrien Jolivet	Zim and Co.	
2006 (31st)	Gilles Lellouche	Love Is in the Air	Ma vie en l'air
2006 (31st)	Aymen Saïdi	Saint-Jacques… La Mecque	
2007 (32nd)	Malik Zidi	Poison Friends	Les amitiés maléfiques
2007 (32nd)	Georges Babluani	13 Tzameti	
2007 (32nd)	Rasha Bukvic	French California	La Californie
2007 (32nd)	Arié Elmaleh	The School for All	L'école pour tous
2007 (32nd)	Vincent Rottiers	The Passenger	Le Passager
2007 (32nd)	James Thiérrée	Twice Upon a Time	Désaccord parfait
2008 (33rd)	Laurent Stocker	Hunting and Gathering	Ensemble, c'est tout
2008 (33rd)	Nicolas Cazalé	The Grocer's Son	Le fils de l'épicier
2008 (33rd)	Grégoire Leprince-Ringuet	Love Songs	Les chansons d'amour
2008 (33rd)	Johan Libéreau	The Witnesses	Les témoins
2008 (33rd)	Jocelyn Quivrin	99 francs	
2009 (34th)	Marc-André Grondin	The First Day of the Rest of Your Life	Le Premier Jour du reste de ta vie
2009 (34th)	Ralph Amoussou	With a Little Help from Myself	Aide-toi, le ciel t'aidera
2009 (34th)	Laurent Capelluto	A Christmas Tale	Un conte de Noël
2009 (34th)	Grégoire Leprince-Ringuet	The Beautiful Person	La Belle Personne
2009 (34th)	Pio Marmaï	The First Day of the Rest of Your Life	Le Premier Jour du reste de ta vie

=== 2010s ===
Year	Winner and nominees	English title	Original title
2010 (35th)	Tahar Rahim	A Prophet	Un prophète
2010 (35th)	Firat Ayverdi	Welcome	
2010 (35th)	Adel Bencherif	A Prophet	Un prophète
2010 (35th)	Vincent Lacoste	The French Kissers	Les Beaux Gosses
2010 (35th)	Vincent Rottiers	I'm Glad My Mother Is Alive	Je suis heureux que ma mère soit vivante
2011 (36th)	Edgar Ramirez	Carlos	
2011 (36th)	Arthur Dupont	Bus Palladium	
2011 (36th)	Grégoire Leprince-Ringuet	The Princess of Montpensier	La Princesse de Montpensier
2011 (36th)	Pio Marmaï	Living on Love Alone	D'amour et d'eau fraîche
2011 (36th)	Raphaël Personnaz	The Princess of Montpensier	La Princesse de Montpensier
2012 (37th)	Grégory Gadebois	Angel & Tony	Angèle et Tony
2012 (37th)	Nicolas Bridet	You Will Be My Son	Tu seras mon fils
2012 (37th)	Guillaume Gouix	Jimmy Rivière	
2012 (37th)	Pierre Niney	18 Years Old and Rising	J'aime regarder les filles
2012 (37th)	Dimitri Storoge	A Gang Story	Les Lyonnais
2013 (38th)	Matthias Schoenaerts	Rust and Bone	De rouille et d'os
2013 (38th)	Felix Moati	Pirate TV	Télé gaucho
2013 (38th)	Kacey Mottet Klein	Sister	L'Enfant d'en haut
2013 (38th)	Pierre Niney	Comme des frères	
2013 (38th)	Ernst Umhauer	In the House	Dans la maison
2014 (39th)	Pierre Deladonchamps	Stranger by the Lake	L'Inconnu du lac
2014 (39th)	Paul Bartel	The Dream Kids	
2014 (39th)	Paul Hamy	Suzanne	
2014 (39th)	Vincent Macaigne	The Rendez-Vous of Déjà-Vu	
2014 (39th)	Nemo Schiffman	On My Way	Elle s'en va
2015 (40th)	Kévin Azaïs	Love at First Fight	Les Combattants
2015 (40th)	Ahmed Dramé	Once in a Lifetime	Les Héritiers
2015 (40th)	Kirill Emelyanov	Eastern Boys	
2015 (40th)	Pierre Rochefort	Going Away	Un beau dimanche
2015 (40th)	Marc Zinga	May Allah Bless France!	Qu'Allah bénisse la France
2016 (41st)	Rod Paradot	Standing Tall	La Tête haute
2016 (41st)	Swann Arlaud	The Anarchists	Les Anarchistes
2016 (41st)	Quentin Dolmaire	My Golden Days	Trois souvenirs de ma jeunesse
2016 (41st)	Félix Moati	All About Them	À trois on y va
2016 (41st)	Finnegan Oldfield	Cowboys	Les Cowboys
2017 (42nd)	Niels Schneider	Dark Inclusion	Diamant noir
2017 (42nd)	Jonas Bloquet	Elle	
2017 (42nd)	Damien Bonnard	Staying Vertical	Rester vertical
2017 (42nd)	Corentin Fila	Being 17	Quand on a 17 ans
2017 (42nd)	Kacey Mottet Klein	Being 17	Quand on a 17 ans
2018 (43rd)	Nahuel Pérez Biscayart	BPM (Beats per Minute)	120 battements par minute
2018 (43rd)	Benjamin Lavernhe	C'est la vie!	Le Sens de la fête
2018 (43rd)	Finnegan Oldfield	Reinventing Marvin	Marvin ou la belle éducation
2018 (43rd)	Pablo Pauly	Patients	
2018 (43rd)	Arnaud Valois	BPM (Beats per Minute)	120 battements par minute
2019 (44th)	Dylan Robert	Shéhérazade	
2019 (44th)	Thomas Gioria	Custody	Jusqu'à la garde
2019 (44th)	William Lebghil	The Freshman	Première Année
2019 (44th)	Anthony Bajon	The Prayer	La Prière
2019 (44th)	Karim Leklou	The World is Yours	Le Monde est à toi

=== 2020s ===
Year	Winner and nominees	English title	Original title
2020 (45th)	Alexis Manenti	Les Misérables	
2020 (45th)	Anthony Bajon	Au nom de la terre	
2020 (45th)	Benjamin Lesieur	The Specials	Hors normes
2020 (45th)	Liam Pierron	La Vie scolaire	
2020 (45th)	Djebril Zonga	Les Misérables	
2021 (46th)	Jean-Pascal Zadi	Tout Simplement Noir	
2021 (46th)	Guang Huo	La Nuit Venue	
2021 (46th)	Félix Lefebvre	Summer of 85	Été 85
2021 (46th)	Benjamin Voisin	Summer of 85	Été 85
2021 (46th)	Alexandre Wetter	Miss	
2022 (47th)	Benjamin Voisin	Lost Illusions	Illusions perdues
2022 (47th)	Sandor Funtek	Suprêmes	
2022 (47th)	Sami Outalbali	A Tale of Love and Desire	Une histoire d'amour et de désir
2022 (47th)	Thimotée Robart	Magnetic Beats	Les magnétiques
2022 (47th)	Makita Samba	Paris, 13th District	Les Olympiades
2023 (48th)	Bastien Bouillon	The Night of the 12th	La nuit du 12
2023 (48th)	Stéfan Crepon	Peter von Kant	
2023 (48th)	Dimitri Doré	Bruno Reidal, Confession of a Murderer	Bruno Reidal, confession d'un meurtirer
2023 (48th)	Paul Kircher	Winter Boy	Le Lycéen
2023 (48th)	Aliocha Reinert	Softie	Petite nature
2024 (49th)	Raphaël Quenard	Junkyard Dog	Chien de la casse
2024 (49th)	Julien Frison	Marguerite's Theorem	Le Théorème de Marguerite
2024 (49th)	Paul Kircher	The Animal Kingdom	Le Règne animal
2024 (49th)	Samuel Kircher	Last Summer	L'Été dernier
2024 (49th)	Milo Machado-Graner	Anatomy of a Fall	Anatomie d'une chute
2025 (50th)	Abou Sangaré	Souleymane's Story	L'Histoire de Souleymane
2025 (50th)	Adam Bessa	Ghost Trail	Les Fantômes
2025 (50th)	Malik Frikah	Beating Hearts	L'Amour ouf
2025 (50th)	Félix Kysyl	Misericordia	Miséricorde
2025 (50th)	Pierre Lottin	The Marching Band	En Fanfare
2026 (51st)	Théodore Pellerin	Nino	
2026 (51st)	Idir Azougli	Meteors	Météors
2026 (51st)	Sayyid El Alami	Block Pass	La Pampa
2026 (51st)	Félix Lefebvre	Hearts on Fire	L'épreuve du feu
2026 (51st)	Guillaume Marbeck	Nouvelle Vague	

== Révélations ==
Each year, the Academy's Governing Board and the Révélations Committee (made up of casting directors working in French film productions) propose a list of a maximum of 16 young actors ("Révélations des César") to facilitate the voting for the "Most Promising Actor" award. Since 2007, young actors who have worked on French feature-length films or French-language productions are eligible for the list. However, beginning from 2013, an actor can qualify for the list only twice. A short film featuring the "Révélations", which is directed by an artist that is appointed by the Academy yearly, is unveiled at a gala dinner held in honour of the "Révélations". The short film is then screened at select cinemas in France.

Nominees of the César Award for Most Promising Actor are highlighted in boldface.

=== 2000s ===
==== 2007 ====
- **Georges Babluani – 13 Tzameti**
- Assaad Bouab – Marock
- Matthieu Boujenah – Marock
- **Rasha Bukvic – La Californie**
- Arthur Dupont – One to Another (Chacun sa nuit)
- **Arié Elmaleh – L'École pour tous**
- Lannick Gautry – Those Happy Days (Nos jours heureux)
- Khalid Maadour – Mr. Average (Comme tout le monde)
- Jean-Baptiste Maunier – Le Grand Meaulnes
- Benjamin Ramon – Call Me Elisabeth (Je m'appelle Elisabeth)
- Vincent Rottiers – The Passenger (Le Passager)
- Alexandre Steiger – Les Amitiés maléfiques
- **James Thierrée – Twice Upon a Time** (Désaccord parfait)
- Yann Trégouët – Itinéraires
- Thibault Vincon – Les Amitiés maléfiques
- **Malik Zidi – Les Amitiés maléfiques**

==== 2008 ====
- Fu'ad Aït Aattou – The Last Mistress (Une vieille maîtresse)
- Paco Boublard – Regarde-moi
- **Nicolas Cazalé – The Grocer's Son** (**Le Fils de l'épicier**)
- Sylvain Dieuaide – Waiting for Someone (J'attends quelqu'un)
- Thomas Dumerchez – After Him (Après lui)
- Andy Gillet – Romance of Astree and Celadon (Les Amours d'Astrée et de Céladon)
- Nicolas Giraud – In Your Wake (Nos retrouvailles)
- Barthélémy Grossmann – 13 m²
- Youssef Hajdi – 13 m²
- **Grégoire Leprince-Ringuet – Love Songs** (**Les Chansons d'amour**)
- **Johan Libéreau – The Witnesses** (**Les Témoins**)
- Daniel Lundh – Délice Paloma
- Terry Nimajimbe – Regarde-moi
- **Jocelyn Quivrin – 99 francs**
- **Laurent Stocker – Hunting and Gathering** (**Ensemble, c'est tout**)
- Cyril Troley – 7 Years (7 ans)

==== 2009 ====
- **Ralph Amoussou – With a Little Help from Myself** (**Aide-toi, le ciel t'aidera**)
- Julien Baumgatner – The Joy of Singing (Le Plaisir de chanter)
- Emile Berling – Behind the Walls (Les Hauts Murs)
- **Laurent Capelluto – A Christmas Tale** (**Un conte de Noël**)
- Esteban Carjaval Alegria – The Beautiful Person (La Belle Personne)
- François Civil – Dying or Feeling Better (Soit je meurs, soit je vais mieux)
- Arthur Dupont – School's Out (Nos 18 ans)
- Théo Frilet – Born in 68 (Nés en 68)
- Nicolas Giraud – Like a Star Shining in the Night (Comme une étoile dans la nuit)
- Guillaume Gouix – Behind the Walls (Les Hauts Murs)
- **Marc-André Grondin – The First Day of the Rest of Your Life** (**Le Premier jour du reste de ta vie**)
- Adrien Jolivet – The Very Very Big Company (La très très grande entreprise)
- **Grégoire Leprince-Ringuet – The Beautiful Person (La Belle Personne)**
- **Pio Marmaï – The First Day of the Rest of Your Life** (**Le Premier jour du reste de ta vie**)
- Yannick Renier – Born in 68 (Nés en 68)
- Guillaume Verdier – L'été indien

=== 2010s ===
==== 2010 ====
- Mhamed Arezki – Goodbye Gary (Adieu Gary)
- **Firat Ayverdi – Welcome**
- Abraham Belaga – Ashes and Blood (Cendres et sang)
- **Adel Bencherif – A Prophet** (**Un prophète**)
- Mehdi Dehbi – He Is My Girl (La Folle Histoire d'amour de Simon Eskenazy)
- Yann Ebongé – La Journée de la jupe
- Cyril Guei – The Other One (L'Autre)
- Jérémy Kapone – LOL (Laughing Out Loud)
- Reda Kateb – Silent Voice (Qu'un seul tienne et les autres suivront)
- **Vincent Lacoste – Les Beaux Gosses**
- Julien Lucas – Silent Voice (Qu'un seul tienne et les autres suivront)
- Alex Lutz – OSS 117: Lost in Rio (OSS 117 : Rio ne répond plus)
- **Tahar Rahim – A Prophet** (**Un prophète**)
- **Vincent Rottiers – I'm Glad My Mother Is Alive (Je suis heureux que ma mère soit vivante)**
- Samy Seghir – Neuilly sa mère !
- Anthony Sonigo – The French Kissers (Les Beaux Gosses)

==== 2011 ====
- Olivier Barthélémy – Our Day Will Come (Notre jour viendra)
- Cyril Descours – Accomplices (Complices)
- **Arthur Dupont – Bus Palladium**
- Cyril Guei – Black Out (Lignes de front)
- Salim Kechiouche – The String (Le Fil)
- **Grégoire Leprince-Ringuet – The Princess of Montpensier** (**La Princesse de Montpensier**)
- Johan Libéreau – Belle Épine
- **Pio Marmaï – Living on Love Alone** (**D'amour et d'eau fraîche**)
- Guillaume Marquet – Love Crime (Crime d'amour)
- Nicolas Maury – Belle Épine
- Arthur Mazet – Lights Out (Simon Werner a disparu...)
- Jules Pelissier – Lights Out (Simon Werner a disparu...)
- Nahuel Pérez Biscayart – Deep in the Woods (Au fond des bois)
- **Raphaël Personnaz – The Princess of Montpensier** (**La Princesse de Montpensier**)
- **Edgar Ramirez – Carlos**
- Thibault Vinçon – The Sentiment of the Flesh (Le Sentiment de la chair)

==== 2012 ====
- **Nicolas Bridet – You Will Be My Son** (**Tu seras mon fils**)
- François Civil – 15 Lads (Nos résistances)
- Jérémie Duvall – Mon père est femme de ménage
- Franck Falise – The End of Silence (La Fin du silence)
- Raphaël Ferret – Guilty (Présumé coupable)
- **Grégory Gadebois – Angel & Tony** (**Angèle et Tony**)
- **Guillaume Gouix – Jimmy Rivière**
- Lapacas – Rebellion (L'Ordre et la Morale)
- Nicolas Maury – Let My People Go!
- Pierre Moure – The Long Falling (Où va la nuit)
- **Pierre Niney – 18 Years Old and Rising** (**J'aime regarder les filles**)
- Pierre Perrier – American Translation
- Aymen Saïdi – The Assault (L'Assaut)
- Mahmoud Shalaby – Free Men (Les Hommes libres)
- Alexandre Steiger – Rebellion (L'Ordre et la Morale)
- **Dimitri Storoge – Les Lyonnais**

==== 2013 ====
- Cédric Ben Abdallah – Superstar
- Emile Berling – Bad Seeds (Comme un homme)
- Jonathan Cohen – A Perfect Plan (Un plan parfait)
- Mehdi Dehbi – The Other Son (Le Fils de l'autre)
- Vincent Lacoste – Asterix and Obelix: God Save Britannia (Astérix et Obélix : Au service de Sa Majesté)
- Benjamin Lavernhe – Radiostars
- Côme Levin – Radiostars
- Clément Metayer – Something in the Air (Après mai)
- **Félix Moati – Pirate TV** (**Télé gaucho**)
- Grégory Montel – L'Air de rien
- **Kacey Mottet Klein – Sister** (**L'Enfant d'en haut**)
- **Pierre Niney – Comme des frères**
- **Matthias Schoenaerts – Rust and Bone** (**De rouille et d'os**)
- Mahmoud Shalaby – A Bottle in the Gaza Sea (Une bouteille à la mer)
- Stéphane Soo Mongo – Rengaine
- **Ernst Umhauer – In the House** (**Dans la maison**)

==== 2014 ====
- Swann Arlaud – Crawl
- **Paul Bartel – Les Petits Princes**
- M'Barek Belkouk – The Marchers (La Marche)
- Zinedine Benchenine – Vandal
- **Pierre Deladonchamps – Stranger by the Lake** (**L'Inconnu du lac**)
- Idrissa Diabate – Asphalt Playground (La Cité rose)
- Youssef Hajdi – Mohamed Dubois
- **Paul Hamy – Suzanne**
- Tewfik Jallab – The Marchers (La Marche)
- Ibrahim Koma – Asphalt Playground (La Cité rose)
- **Vincent Macaigne – La Fille du 14 juillet**
- Hamza Meziani – Les Apaches
- Driss Ramdi – Je ne suis pas mort
- Jules Sagot – Tu seras un homme

==== 2015 ====
- **Kévin Azaïs – Love at First Fight** (**Les Combattants**)
- Thomas Blumenthal – La Crème de la crème
- Bastien Bouillon – High Society (Le Beau Monde)
- Zacharie Chasseriaud – The Good Life (La Belle Vie)
- Félix de Givry – Eden
- Romain Depret – Wild Life (Vie sauvage)
- **Ahmed Dramé – Once in a Lifetime** (**Les Héritiers**)
- Kirill Emelyanov – Eastern Boys
- Jean-Baptiste Lafarge – La Crème de la crème
- Ymanol Perset – Colt 45
- Jules Ritmanic – Wild Life (Vie sauvage)
- **Pierre Rochefort – Going Away** (**Un beau dimanche**)
- Fayçal Safi – L'Apôtre
- Thomas Solivéres – The Grad Job (À toute épreuve)
- **Daniil Vorobjev – Eastern Boys**
- **Marc Zinga – May Allah Bless France!** (**Qu'Allah bénisse la France**)

==== 2016 ====
- **Swann Arlaud** – **The Anarchists** (**Les Anarchistes**)
- Jules Benchetrit – Macadam Stories (Asphalte)
- Mehdi Djaadi – I'm All Yours (Je suis à vous tout de suite)
- **Quentin Dolmaire** – **My Golden Days** (**Trois souvenirs de ma jeunesse**)
- Khereddine Ennasri – Nous trois ou rien
- Aurélien Gabrielli – Quand je ne dors pas
- Kheiron – Nous trois ou rien
- Karim Leklou – Heat Wave (Coup de chaud)
- Alban Lenoir – French Blood (Un Français)
- Martin Loizillon – Fever
- Sâm Mirhosseini – The Wakhan Front (Ni le ciel ni la terre)
- **Félix Moati** – **All About Them** (**À trois on y va**)
- **Finnegan Oldfield** – **Cowboys** (**Les Cowboys**)
- Harmandeep Palminder – Young Tiger (Bébé Tigre)
- **Rod Paradot** – **Standing Tall** (**La Tête haute**)
- Syrus Shahidi – Don't Tell Me the Boy Was Mad (Une histoire de fou)
- Mathieu Spinosi – Memories (Les Souvenirs)

==== 2017 ====
- Steve Achiepo – Tout, tout de suite
- **Jonas Bloquet – Elle**
- **Damien Bonnard** – **Staying Vertical** (**Rester vertical**)
- César Chouraqui – The Origin of Violence ('L'Origine de la violence)
- **Corentin Fila** – **Being 17** (**Quand on a 17 ans**)
- Sofian Khammes – Chouf
- Kyan Khojandi – Rosalie Blum
- Roman Kolinka – Things to Come (L'Avenir)
- William Lebghil – La Fine Équipe
- Alexis Manenti – The Stopover (Voir du pays)
- Hamza Meziani – Nocturama
- **Kacey Mottet Klein** – **Being 17** (**Quand on a 17 ans**)
- David Murgia – The First, the Last (Les Premiers, les Derniers)
- Toki Pilioko – Mercenary (Mercenaire)
- Marc Ruchmann – Tout, tout de suite
- **Niels Schneider** – **Dark Inclusion** (**Diamant noir**)
- Thomas Scimeca – Apnée

==== 2018 ====
- Khaled Alouach – De toutes mes forces
- Adam Bessa – Les Bienheureux
- Damien Chapelle – Endangered Species
- Idir Chender – Carbone
- Redouanne Harjane – M
- Sébastien Houbani – A Wedding (Noces)
- Alban Ivanov – C'est la vie! (Le Sens de la fête)
- Benjamin Lavernhe – C'est la vie! (Le Sens de la fête)
- Matthieu Lucci – The Workshop (L'Atelier)
- Naït Oufella – Raw (Grave)
- Nekfeu – Tout nous sépare
- Finnegan Oldfield – Reinventing Marvin (Marvin ou la Belle Éducation)
- Pablo Pauly – Patients
- Nahuel Pérez Biscayart – BPM (Beats per Minute) (120 battements par minute)
- Antoine Reinartz – BPM (Beats per Minute) (120 battements par minute)
- Ahmed Sylla – L'Ascension
- Arnaud Valois – BPM (Beats per Minute) (120 battements par minute)
- Marc Zinga – Nos Patriotes

== See also ==
- Lumière Award for Best Male Revelation
- Magritte Award for Most Promising Actor
