= 33rd César Awards =

2008 French film awards ceremony

33rd César Award
- Date: 22 February 2008
- Site: Théâtre du Châtelet, Paris, France
- Hosted by: Antoine de Caunes

Highlights
- Best Film: The Secret of the Grain
- Best Actor: Mathieu Amalric; The Diving Bell and the Butterfly
- Best Actress: Marion Cotillard; La Vie en Rose
- Most awards: La Vie en Rose (5)
- Most nominations: La Vie en Rose & A Secret (11)

Television coverage
- Network: Canal+

The 33rd César Awards ceremony was presented by the Académie des Arts et Techniques du Cinéma to honour the best films of 2007 in France. It was held on 22 February 2008 at the Théâtre du Châtelet in Paris. The ceremony was chaired by Jean Rochefort and hosted by Antoine de Caunes. The Secret of the Grain won the award for Best Film.

== Winners and nominees ==
The nominees were announced on 25 January 2008. The winners are in bold.

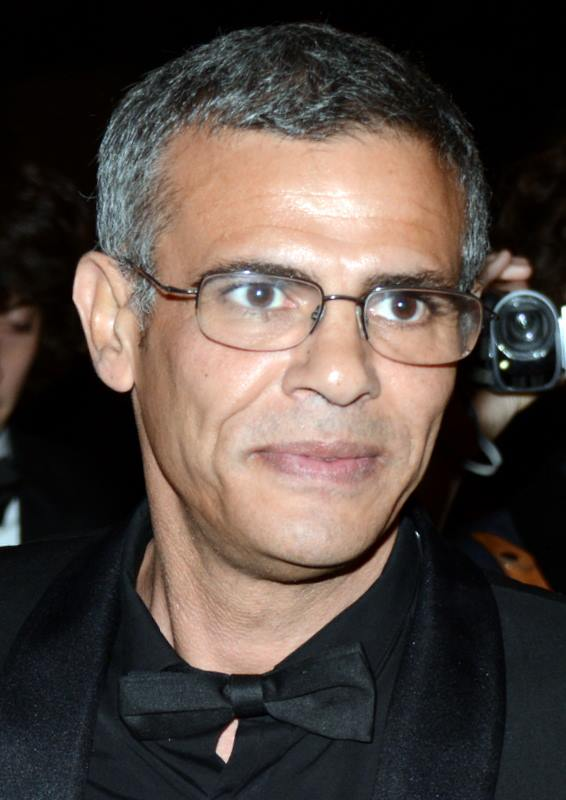
Abdellatif Kechiche, Best Director and Best Original Screenplay winner

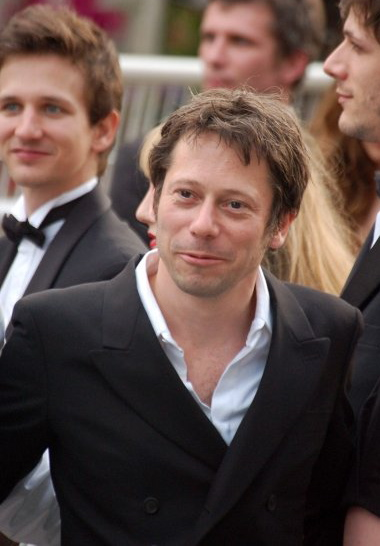
Mathieu Amalric, Best Actor winner

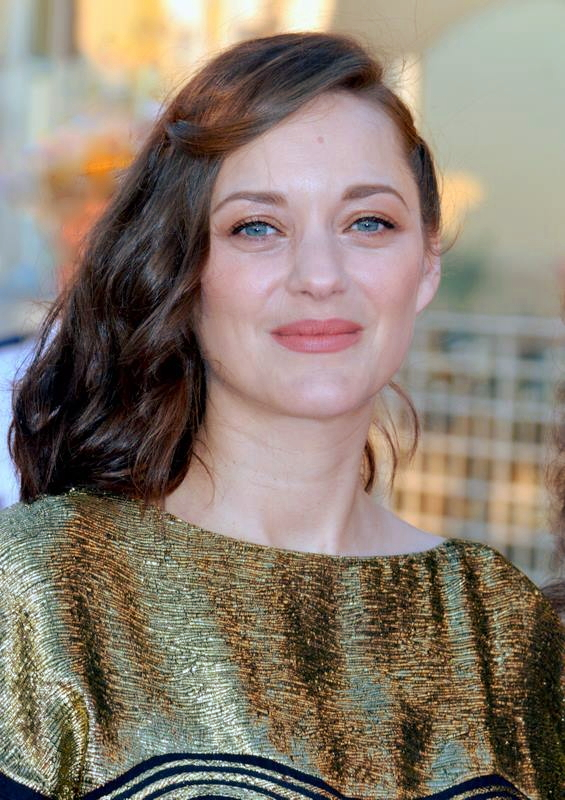
Marion Cotillard, Best Actress winner

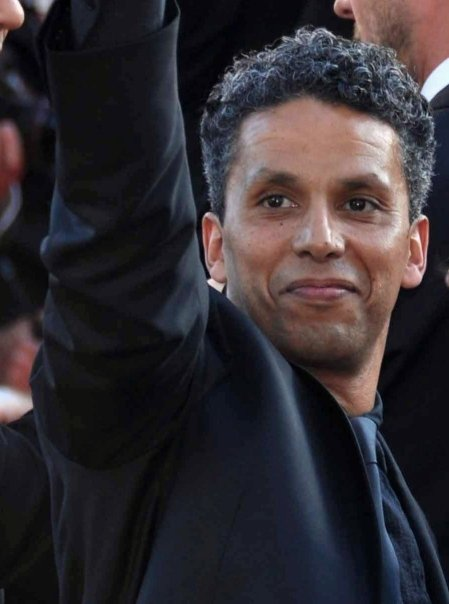
Sami Bouajila, Best Supporting Actor winner

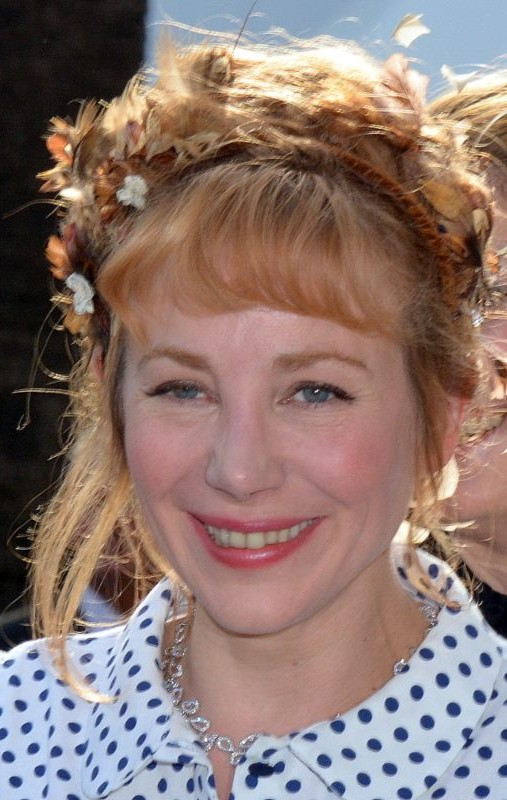
Julie Depardieu, Best Supporting Actress winner

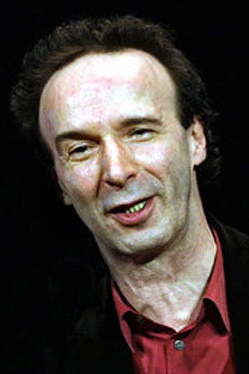
Roberto Benigni, Honorary César recipient

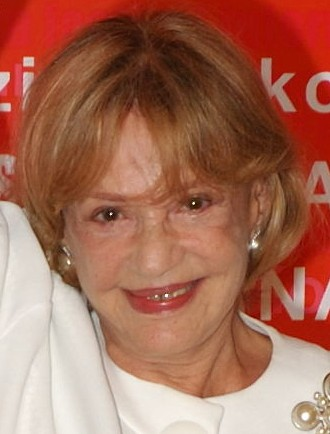
Jeanne Moreau, Honorary César recipient

**Best Film** **(presented by Charlotte Rampling and Jean Rochefort)** **The Secret of the Grain**: La Vie en Rose; Persepolis; The Diving Bell and the Butterfly; A Secret	**Best Director** **(presented by Nathalie Baye and Édouard Baer)** **Abdellatif Kechiche – The Secret of the Grain**: Olivier Dahan – La Vie en Rose; Julian Schnabel – The Diving Bell and the Butterfly; André Téchiné – The Witnesses; Claude Miller – A Secret
**Best Actor** **(presented by Marina Hands)** **Mathieu Amalric – The Diving Bell and the Butterfly**: Michel Blanc – The Witnesses; Jean-Pierre Darroussin – Conversations with My Gardener; Vincent Lindon – Those Who Remain; Jean-Pierre Marielle – Let's Dance	**Best Actress** **(presented by Alain Delon)** **Marion Cotillard – La Vie en Rose**: Isabelle Carré – Anna M.; Cécile de France – A Secret; Marina Foïs – Darling; Catherine Frot – Odette Toulemonde
**Best Supporting Actor** **(presented by Virginie Ledoyen)** **Sami Bouajila – The Witnesses**: Pascal Greggory – La Vie en Rose; Michael Lonsdale – Heartbeat Detector; Fabrice Luchini – Molière; Laurent Stocker – Hunting and Gathering	**Best Supporting Actress** **(presented by François-Xavier Demaison)** **Julie Depardieu – A Secret**: Noémie Lvovsky – Actrices; Bulle Ogier – Let's Dance; Ludivine Sagnier – A Secret; Sylvie Testud – La Vie en Rose
**Most Promising Actor** **(presented by Alice Taglioni)** **Laurent Stocker – Hunting and Gathering**: Nicolas Cazalé – The Grocer's Son; Grégoire Leprince-Ringuet – Love Songs; Johan Libéreau – The Witnesses; Jocelyn Quivrin – 99 francs	**Most Promising Actress** **(presented by Vahina Giocante and Malik Zidi)** **Hafsia Herzi – The Secret of the Grain**: Louise Blachère – Water Lilies; Audrey Dana – Roman de Gare; Adèle Haenel – Water Lilies; Clotilde Hesme – Love Songs
**Best Original Screenplay** **(presented by Clotilde Courau)** **The Secret of the Grain** – **Abdellatif Kechiche**: 2 Days in Paris – Julie Delpy; Those Who Remain – Anne Le Ny; Molière – Laurent Tirard and Grégoire Vigneron; La Vie en Rose – Olivier Dahan	**Best Adaptation** **(presented by Michel Houellebecq)** **Persepolis** – **Marjane Satrapi and Vincent Paronnaud**: Darling – Christine Carrière; Hunting and Gathering – Claude Berri; The Diving Bell and the Butterfly – Ronald Harwood; A Secret – Claude Miller and Natalie Carter
**Best First Feature Film** **(presented by Léa Drucker and Emma de Caunes)** **Persepolis**: Those Who Remain; Et toi, t'es sur qui?; Water Lilies; All Is Forgiven	**Best Cinematography** **(presented by Jean-Claude Van Damme and Louise Bourgoin)** **Tetsuo Nagata – La Vie en Rose**: Yves Angelo – The Second Wind; Giovanni Fiore Coltellacci – Intimate Enemies; Janusz Kamiński – The Diving Bell and the Butterfly; Gérard de Battista – A Secret
**Best Editing** **(presented by Jean-Claude Van Damme and Louise Bourgoin)** **Juliette Welfling – The Diving Bell and the Butterfly**: Ghalya Lacroix and Camille Toubkis – The Secret of the Grain; Richard Marizy and Yves Beloniak – La Vie en Rose; Stéphane Roche – Persepolis; Véronique Lange – A Secret	**Best Sound** **(presented by Élie Semoun)** **Laurent Zeilig, Pascal Villard, Jean-Paul Hurier and Marc Doisne – La Vie en Rose**: Guillaume Le Braz, Valérie Deloof, Agnès Ravez and Thierry Delor – Love Songs; Antoine Deflandre, Germain Boulay and Eric Tisserand – Intimate Enemies; Thierry Lebon, Eric Chevallier and Samy Bardet – Persepolis; Jean-Paul Mugel, Francis Wargnier and Dominique Gaborieau – The Diving Bell and the Butterfly
**Best Original Music** **(presented by Gilles Lellouche and Jean-Paul Rouve)** **Alex Beaupain – Love Songs**: Alexandre Desplat – Intimate Enemies; Archie Shepp – Let's Dance; Olivier Bernet – Persepolis; Zbigniew Preisner – A Secret	**Best Costume Design** **(presented by Marie Gillain)** **Marit Allen – La Vie en Rose**: Corinne Jorry – The Second Wind; Jean-Daniel Vuillermoz – Jacquou le Croquant; Pierre-Jean Larroque – Molière; Jacqueline Bouchard – A Secret
**Best Production Design** **(presented by Élie Semoun)** **Olivier Raoux – La Vie en Rose**: Thierry Flamand – The Second Wind; Christian Marti – Jacquou le Croquant; Françoise Dupertuis – Molière; Jean-Pierre Kohut-Svelko – A Secret	**Best Short Film** **(presented by Mélanie Laurent)** **Le Mozart des pickpockets**: Deweneti; Premier Voyage; La Promenade; Rachel
**Best Documentary Film** **(presented by Aïssa Maïga)** **Terror's Advocate**: Les Animaux amoureux; Les Lip, l'imagination au pouvoir; Le Premier Cri; Retour en Normandie	**Best Foreign Film** **(presented by Caterina Murino)** **The Lives of Others**: 4 Months, 3 Weeks and 2 Days; The Edge of Heaven; We Own the Night; Eastern Promises
**Honorary César** **(presented by Fanny Ardant and Melvil Poupaud)** **Roberto Benigni**; **Jeanne Moreau**; **Romy Schneider** (posthumous), homage by Alain Delon

== Viewers ==
The show was followed by 2.4 million viewers. This corresponds to 11.9% of the audience.

== See also ==
- 80th Academy Awards
- 61st British Academy Film Awards
- 20th European Film Awards
- 13th Lumière Awards
