= 13th Lumière Awards =

2008 French film awards ceremony

- Date: 13 January 2008
- Site: Hôtel de Ville, Paris, France

Highlights
- Best Film: The Diving Bell and the Butterfly
- Best Director: Abdellatif Kechiche
- Best Actor: Mathieu Amalric
- Best Actress: Marion Cotillard

The 13th Lumière Awards ceremony, presented by the Académie des Lumières, was held on 13 January 2008. The ceremony was chaired by Claude Lelouch. The Diving Bell and the Butterfly won the award for Best Film and Jean-Pierre Marielle was presented with the honorary Lumière Award.

== Winners and nominees ==
Winners are listed first and highlighted in bold.

Best Film	Best Director
**The Diving Bell and the Butterfly**: La Vie en Rose; The Secret of the Grain; Persepolis; Room of Death	**Abdellatif Kechiche — The Secret of the Grain**: André Téchiné — The Witnesses; Olivier Dahan — La Vie en Rose; Julian Schnabel — The Diving Bell and the Butterfly; Alfred Lot — Room of Death
Best Actor	Best Actress
**Mathieu Amalric — The Diving Bell and the Butterfly**: Jean-Pierre Marielle — Let's Dance; Guillaume Depardieu — The Duchess of Langeais; Benoît Magimel — A Girl Cut in Two & 24 Bars; Jean-Pierre Darroussin — Le Cœur des hommes 2; Gérard Darmon — Le Cœur des hommes 2; Marc Lavoine — Le Cœur des hommes 2; Bernard Campan — Le Cœur des hommes 2	**Marion Cotillard — La Vie en Rose**: Mélanie Laurent — Room of Death; Sylvie Testud — The Vanishing Point; Ludivine Sagnier — A Girl Cut in Two; Marina Foïs — Darling
Most Promising Actor	Most Promising Actress
**Jocelyn Quivrin** — **99 francs**: Kolia Litscher — Charly; Laurent Stocker — Hunting and Gathering; Yannick Renier — Private Property; Fu'ad Ait Aattou — The Last Mistress	**Hafsia Herzi** — **The Secret of the Grain**: Romola Garai — Angel; Clotilde Hesme — Love Songs; Audrey Dana — Roman de Gare; Lucie Desclozeaux — Et toi, t'es sur qui?; Christa Theret — Et toi, t'es sur qui?
Best Screenplay	Best French-Language Film
**Room of Death — Alfred Lot**: Actrices — Valeria Bruni Tedeschi, Agnès De Sacy and Noémie Lvovsky; The Witnesses — Laurent Guyot, André Téchiné and Viviane Zingg; The Vanishing Point — Laurent de Bartillat and Alain Ross; Darling — Christine Carrière	**Délice Paloma**: Cowboy; Gone for a Dance; In the Arms of My Enemy; Days of Darkness; Africa Paradis
Best Cinematography	World Audience Award (presented by TV5Monde)
**Éric Gauthier** — **Into the Wild**	**La Vie en Rose** — **Olivier Dahan**
Honorary Lumière Award
**Jean-Pierre Marielle**

== See also ==
- 33rd César Awards
