= LOL (2012 film) =

2012 film by Lisa Azuelos

- Theatrical release poster
- Directed by: Lisa Azuelos
- Screenplay by: Lisa Azuelos; Kamir Aïnouz
- Based on: LOL (Laughing Out Loud) by: Lisa Azuelos; Nans Delgado
- Produced by: Michael Shamberg; Stacey Sher; Tish Cyrus
- Starring: Miley Cyrus; Demi Moore; Ashley Greene; Adam Sevani
- Cinematography: Kieran McGuigan
- Edited by: Myron Kerstein
- Music by: Rob Simonsen
- Production companies: Mandate Pictures; Double Feature Films
- Distributed by: Lionsgate
- Release dates: March 1, 2012 (Singapore); May 4, 2012 (United States)
- Running time: 97 minutes
- Country: United States
- Language: English
- Budget: $11 million
- Box office: $10.6 million

LOL is a 2012 American teen romantic comedy-drama film written and directed by Lisa Azuelos. A remake of the 2008 French film LOL (Laughing Out Loud) (also directed by Azuelos), the film stars Miley Cyrus, Demi Moore, Ashley Greene, and Adam Sevani.

The film was first released in India on February 10, 2012, followed by a limited theatrical release in the United States on May 4, 2012, by Lionsgate.

== Plot ==
Lola "Lol" Williams leads an ordinary life in Chicago, with her boyfriend Chad and best friends Emily, Janice, and Kyle Ross. When they return to school after the summer, Lol discovers that Chad has cheated on her, so they break up.

Lol and Kyle realize they have feelings for each other and pursue a relationship. This is difficult as Chad is his best friend, and Lol's nemesis Ashley is a flirt, especially with Kyle. His and Chad's band, No Shampoo, wants to compete in the battle of the bands, but Kyle's father does not support his passion for music and feels that it interferes with his schoolwork. Chad's jealousy towards Lol and Kyle's new relationship further complicates things.

Lol's mother Anne is a divorcée, who frequently has sex with her ex-husband Allen, until she discovers he has also been sleeping with another woman. She also begins to feel she and Lol are growing apart. Lol throws a party and is caught by Anne who threatens to not allow her to go on her class trip to Paris. She was already grounded for the party.

Things finally start to change when Anne meets police officer James and they begin to date. He offers her advice on how to reconnect with Lol, which she takes up. After a presentation at school, Lol looks for Kyle in the bathroom and overhears two people having sex in the stall. She assumes it is Kyle and Ashley after seeing a purse similar to Ashley's peeking out from under the stall.

It was actually Emily and Wen hooking up, but Emily does not tell Lol because she is embarrassed about being with him. Afterwards, Lol confronts Ashley, who does not deny it because she likes Kyle and wants to create a rift in Lol and Kyle's relationship.

A huge argument ensues between Kyle and Lol, where she accuses him of cheating, and they break up. When Kyle's father discovers he has lied about his grades and smoked pot, he grounds him and destroys his guitar. After the breakup, Lol is determined to make Kyle jealous, so tries to do so by making out with her childhood friend Jeremy. Meanwhile, she and her mother reconnect, and Anne allows her to go on the class trip to Paris.

While on the trip, Emily finally admits to Lol it was actually her and Wen in the bathroom, not Ashley and Kyle. After this realization, Lol and Kyle reconcile and spend the night together, where they end up having sex for the first time.

When they all return home, Chad and Kyle rekindle their friendship and he gives his blessing to Kyle and Lol. She sticks up for Ashley when Chad insults her, resulting in them becoming friends. Meanwhile, Anne finds Lol's diary, discovering that she has slept with Kyle and smoked pot. Confronting her, they have a huge falling-out, and Lol moves in with her father.

Eventually, Lol and Anne reconcile and she moves back in with her mother. Kyle's band wins the battle of the bands and his father finally begins to support his musical aspirations. Kyle and Lol stay together. Ashley and Chad begin to date and Emily and Wen are together, as she is no longer embarrassed to be with him. The film ends with Anne and Lol laughing out loud while cuddling.

== Cast ==
- Miley Cyrus as Lola "Lol" Williams
- Demi Moore as Anne Williams
- Ashley Greene as Ashley
- Douglas Booth as Kyle Ross
- Adam Sevani as Wen
- Thomas Jane as Allen Williams
- Jay Hernandez as James
- Marlo Thomas as Gran Williams
- Nora Dunn as Emily's mother
- Gina Gershon as Kathy
- Fisher Stevens as Roman
- George Finn as Chad
- Lina Esco as Janice
- Ashley Hinshaw as Emily
- Tanz Watson as Lloyd
- Austin Nichols as Teacher Colin Ross
- Jean-Luc Bilodeau as Jeremy
- Brady Tutton as Jackson
- Terdman as Concert Groupie

== Production ==
Principal photography began on July 16, 2010, in Dearborn, Michigan. LOL was primarily filmed at Grosse Pointe South High School in the city of Grosse Pointe, a suburb northeast of Detroit, Michigan. It was also shot in Chicago, Illinois. In September 2010, production moved to Paris. Post-production began on September 14, 2010, and required a year and two weeks before it was completed on November 1, 2011. The film was set to be released in 2011 but it was pushed to 2012. The film was initially supposed to be a television drama, but such plans were changed when the series ran into legal issues connected to the French film of the same name.

=== Soundtrack ===
1. "Everybody" – Ingrid Michaelson
2. "Everybody's Got to Learn Sometime" – Jean-Phillipe Verdin
3. "You Can't Always Get What You Want" – The Rolling Stones
4. "Somewhere Only We Know" – Keane
5. "Houdini" – Foster the People
6. "The Big Bang" – Rock Mafia
7. "Microphone" – Coconut Records
8. "Location" – Freelance Whales
9. "Cul et chemize" – BB Brunes
10. "Birds" – The Submarines
11. "Heart on Fire" – Jonathan Clay
12. "Little Sister" – Jonathan Clay and Becky Henkel
13. "Dreamers" – Jonathan Clay
14. "I'm Gonna Love You Just a Little More Baby" – the LOL School Girls

== Release ==
LOL was first released theatrically in Singapore on March 1, 2012. After Lionsgate acquired U.S. distribution rights, executives at the studio were not confident in the film's profitability. Due to Mandate Pictures' contracts with foreign distributors, which stipulated that the film must be shown domestically in at least 100 theaters, LOL was given a limited release in seven cities in the United States on May 4, 2012, with limited promotion. On its opening weekend in the U.S., the film grossed $46,500 from 105 theaters, with an average of $440 per theater.

=== Home media ===
The film was made available on DVD, Blu-ray, digital download, and on-demand on July 31, 2012, in the United States from Lionsgate Home Entertainment.

== Reception ==
=== Critical response ===
LOL was not received well by critics. On the review aggregator website Rotten Tomatoes, the film holds an approval rating of 14% based on seven reviews, with an average rating of 3.7/10. Film critic Joe Leydon in Variety called it a "shapeless and charmless teen-skewing trifle stocked with trendy slanguage and social-network gimcracks that make it seem like something four years past its expiration date."

=== Accolades ===
Award	Category	Recipient	Result
2012 Teen Choice Awards	Choice Movie Actress: Romance	Miley Cyrus	Nominated
2012 Do Something Awards	Movie Star: Female	Miley Cyrus	Nominated
