= Amélie Etasse =

French actress (born 1984)

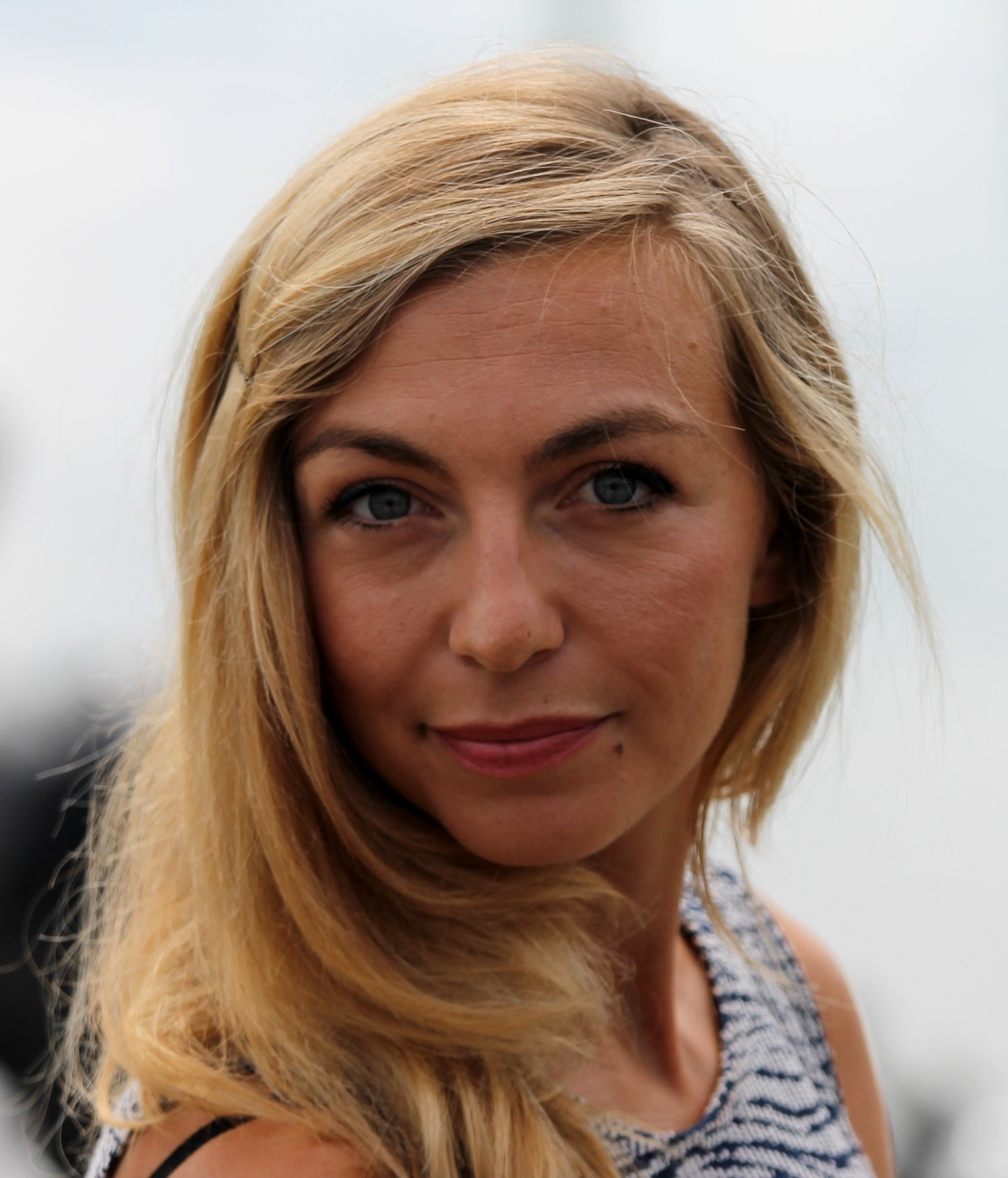
- Amélie Etasse in the Festival de la fiction TV de La Rochelle 2015.
- Born: 8 June 1984 (age 41); Paris
- Occupation: Actress
- Television: Scènes de ménages
- Website: amelieetasse.fr

Amélie Etasse (born 8 June 1984) is a French actress.

The actress is best known for her participation in the television series Scènes de ménages. Beyond theatrical scenes, she also participated in a major advertising campaign for Marque Repère products sold by the mass-market company known as E.Leclerc.

== Biography ==
Amélie Etasse trained at the Claude Mathieu School. She also learns singing at the "Chœur de la Ville" and thanks to Carine Robert. Previously, she studied theatre and dance at the Georges Bizet conservatory, and at a Paris theatre school. She also passed a bachelor's degree "Performing Arts, theatre option" in the 5th arrondissement of Paris.

Amélie Etasse is eclectic. She contributes to the writing of the blog Paris Mieux Mieux and created the character of the Loove, which she embodies in the short series La Loove visible on studio 4 (produced by France Télévisions and Aprile productions). She is an Actor on television and in the theatre.

== Filmography ==
=== Television ===
- 2011: Trop la classe café !: Amélie
- 2012: Le Jour où tout a basculé (season 2), episode My Sister is Scamming my Mother: Cindy (1 episode)
- 2013: R.I.S, police scientifique: episode The Threat (season 8), tourist in front of Pantheon
- 2013: Ma Meuf: Sandra (14 episodes)
- 2013: Profilage (season 3): young colleague from police station
- 2013–14: Les Textapes d'Alice: Xtina
- 2015: Call My Agent!: Magalie (1 episode)
- Since 2015: Scènes de ménages: Camille

=== Short films ===
- 2012: Bisou: Sandra Desbains
- 2013: À dimanche prochain
- 2013: Le Bisou
- 2013: L'Homme pince: Carole
- 2013: Le petit cheval de Troie: Ève
- 2013: Entre rouge et loup: Rouge
- 2013: Chachacha: dancer
- 2013: Sans un mot: wife
- 2016: Speed/Dating: Sophie

=== Web series ===
- 2014: Les Mordus du Bocal (6play)
- 2014: Les textapes d'Alice
- 2015: La Loove (France 4) (she wrote)

=== Musical comedies ===
- 2006–11: Jeux de mots laids pour gens bêtes (Léonie Pingeot): Léna
- 2011–13: Redis-Le Me (Léonie Pingeot)

=== Advertising ===
Amélie Etasse has been the voice-over for commercials broadcast on radio and television from several companies, such as Samsung, Ricola, Matins, Intimy, Europcar, Kwikso and E.Leclerc.

- 2004: Musée d'Art Contemporain du Val-de-Marne
- 2005: Canal+
- 2006: Festival du film étudiant de Québec
- 2008: Match.com
- Since 2010: La Blonde / Marque Repère, E.Leclerc
- 2011: Groupama
- 2011: Flunch
- 2012: Copra
- 2017: Une serveuse / Lidl

== Theatre ==
- 2005: Fool For Love (Jean Bellorini): Kate
- 2007: Je me tiens devant toi nue (Delphine Lequenne): Marianne
- 2008–09: Après la pluie (Camille de la Guillonnière): blonde secretary
- 2010: Love in the City (Pascal Buresi): main role
- 2010: Tango (Camille de la Guillonnière): Aline
- 2012: Les Colocataires (improvisational theatre)
- 2012: Doris Darling (Marianne Groves)
- 2013–14: Bonjour Ivresse (Franck Le Hen)
- 2017: Bouquet final

== Awards and nominations ==
- Prix Mague 2013: Artistic performance of the year in Doris Darling
