= 18 Years Old and Rising =

2011 French comedy film

- Theatrical release poster
- Directed by: Frédéric Louf
- Written by: Frédéric Louf; Régis Jaulin
- Produced by: Hugues Charbonneau; Marie-Ange Luciani; Gilles Sandoz
- Starring: Pierre Niney
- Cinematography: Samuel Collardey
- Edited by: Françoise Tourmen
- Music by: Jozef Dumoulin; Bo Van Der Werf
- Production companies: Les Films de Pierre; Maia Cinema
- Distributed by: BAC Films
- Release dates: 17 June 2011 (Cabourg); 20 July 2011 (France)
- Running time: 92 minutes
- Country: France
- Language: French
- Budget: $1.8 million
- Box office: $347,100

18 Years Old and Rising (French: J'aime regarder les filles, lit. 'I like to watch girls') is a 2011 French comedy film directed by Frédéric Louf.

The original French title of the film is taken from a 1981 Patrick Coutin hit song called "J'aime regarder les filles".

== Plot ==
Primo, son of Province florists, struggles paying his rent. He spends his tray for the second time. On the eve of 10 May 1981 he meets Gabrielle and he falls madly in love with her at first sight. Unfortunately they don't take to the same people. Primo then will try anything to get a place in this Parisian bourgeois society that seems so difficult to access. In order to show his passion and love for Gabrielle he doesn't hesitate to take risks, even if that requires him to become illicit and put his life in danger.

== Cast ==
- Pierre Niney as Primo Bramsi
- Lou de Laâge as Gabrielle
- Audrey Bastien as Delphine
- Ali Marhyar as Malik
- Victor Bessière as Paul
- Michel Vuillermoz as Pierre Bramsi
- Catherine Chevallier as Françoise Bramsi
- Johan Libéreau as Nino Bramsi
- Odile Vuillemin as Marie-Ange Bramsi
- Thomas Chabrol as the math professor
- Hervé Pierre as Delphine's father
- Jean-Baptiste Marcenac as Gabrielle's father
- Rachid Benbouchta as Rachid
- Mathieu Lourdel as Olivier
- Marion Chabassol as Sophie
- Yohan Djabour as Jean-Yves

== Release ==
The film was presented at the Cabourg Film Festival (France), the Toronto International Film Festival (Canada), the São Paulo International Film Festival (Brazil) and the Taipei Golden Horse Film Festival (Taiwan).

== Accolades ==
Award	Category	Recipient	Result
Cabourg Film Festival	Male Revelation	Pierre Niney	Won
César Award	Most Promising Actor	Pierre Niney	Nominated
