= Through the Fire (2018 film) =

2018 French drama film

- Theatrical release poster
- French: Sauver ou périr
- Directed by: Frédéric Tellier
- Written by: Frédéric Tellier; David Oelhoffen
- Produced by: Julien Madon
- Starring: Pierre Niney; Anaïs Demoustier
- Cinematography: Renaud Chassaing
- Edited by: Gwen Mallauran
- Music by: Christophe La Pinta; Frédéric Tellier
- Production companies: A Single Man; Mars Films; France 3 Cinéma; Umedia
- Distributed by: Mars Films
- Release date: 28 November 2018
- Running time: 116 minutes
- Country: France
- Language: French

Through the Fire (French: Sauver ou périr, lit. 'Save or Perish') is a 2018 French drama film directed by Frédéric Tellier and released on 28 November 2018. The title is the motto of the Brigade of firefighters of Paris. The film stars Pierre Niney and Anaïs Demoustier.

== Plot ==
Franck, a firefighter since the age of eighteen, is proud of his job lives in his barracks with his companion. One day, while responding to an emergency, he sacrifices himself for his men and wakes up in a hospital burn victims unit. The film follows Franck's journey trying to get his life back to normal.

== Cast ==
- Pierre Niney as Franck
- Anaïs Demoustier as Cécile
- Vincent Rottiers as Martin
- Chloé Stefani as Nathalie
- Sami Bouajila as Dr Almeida
- Damien Bonnard as Marlo
- Annie Mercier as Annie
- Élisabeth Commelin as Franck's mother
- Calypso Buijtenhuijs as Caporal Fameaux
