= Pierre Niney =

French actor

Pierre Niney OOAL
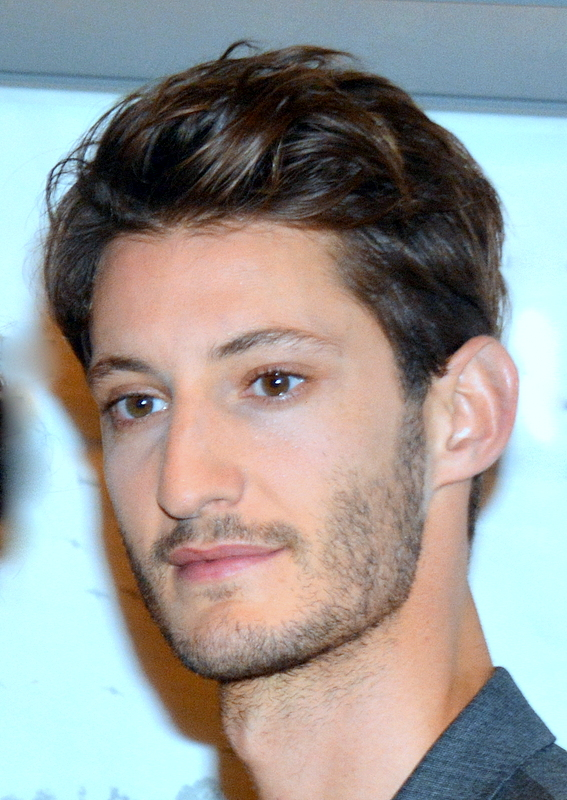
- Niney in 2016
- Born: 13 March 1989 (age 37); Boulogne-Billancourt, France
- Occupation: Actor
- Years active: 2007–present
- Partner: Natasha Andrews (2008)
- Children: 2

Pierre François Lazare Niney (Born March 13 1989) is a French actor. Regarded as a French cinematic cultural icon, Niney has received numerous accolades, including a César Award for Best Actor for his portrayal of the title character in the 2014 biographical film Yves Saint Laurent, as well as five additional César nominations. One of France’s most bankable stars, he starred as Edmond Dantès in the 2024 film adaptation of The Count of Monte Cristo, which became one of France’s biggest box-office successes of all time, attracting 9.4 million admissions in the country. The film’s success further cemented Niney as one of the most prominent French public figures of his generation.

Having been the youngest-ever male member of the Comédie-Française, where he performed from 2010 to 2015, Niney made his film debut in the 2008 teenage comedy LOL (Laughing Out Loud), starring Sophie Marceau. In 2012, Niney received his first César nomination for Best Male Revelation for his performance in the coming-of-age comedy 18 Years Old and Rising. In 2013, he starred alongside Virginie Efira in the commercially successful comedy It Boy. He achieved national stardom the following year with his portrayal of Yves Saint Laurent in the biographical film of the same name, for which he won his first César Award for Best Actor, becoming the youngest-ever winner in the category.

Niney continued to establish himself as one of France’s leading actors, earning further César nominations for his performances in Frantz (2016) and Black Box (2021). The former, regarded as an accomplished art-house film, competed for the Golden Lion at the Venice Film Festival and was named one of the National Board of Review’s Top Five International Films of 2017. His portrayal of Edmond Dantès in The Count of Monte Cristo received widespread critical acclaim and the film became a major international box-office success, grossing more than $100 million worldwide. His performance earned him his sixth César Award nomination.

In 2015, Niney was awarded the third class, chevalier, of the French Ordre des Arts et des Lettres.

== Early life ==
Niney was born in Boulogne-Billancourt, Hauts-de-Seine, France. His family is of Sephardic Jewish (Turkish-Jewish) and Catholic background. His father, François Niney, is a film professor at Normale Sup, La Fémis and Sciences Po. His mother was born in Belgium and is an author of creative leisure manuals.

He grew up in the 14th arrondissement of Paris, and began acting when he was eleven. He studied at the lycée Claude-Monet and after completing his baccalauréat littéraire, took a course with the Compagnie Pandora during which he worked on stage direction with Brigitte Jaques-Wajeman and François Regnault. After one year he auditioned for the Cours Florent where he remained for two years; in 2009 he entered the Conservatoire national supérieur d'art dramatique in Paris.

== Career ==
As the youngest male member of the Comédie-Française aged 21, he gained his first experiences in the theatre under directors such as Julie Brochen at the Cartoucherie de Vincennes, Vladimir Pankov at the Théâtre Meyerhold in Moscow, and Emmanuel Demarcy-Mota. After small roles in television films and shorts, his first cinema roles were as the son of Michel Blanc's character in Nos 18 ans, a lycée student in LOL Henri Keltekian in Robert Guédiguian's L'armée du crime selected for Cannes in 2009, and alongside Benoît Poelvoorde and Isabelle Carré in Les Émotifs anonymes. His first leading role was in the 2011 film J'aime regarder les filles, which resulted in his nomination for a César de la meilleure révélation masculine in 2012; he was nominated for the same award for Comme des frères the following year.

In 2014, Niney starred as fashion designer Yves Saint Laurent in the biopic of the same name directed by Jalil Lespert, for which he won a César Award for Best Actor. Niney commented that he faced three challenges: that he had "to play a manic depressive", that he aged in the film "from around 18 to 46 years old" and lastly "not to lose the link between all the faces of the character. He is changing so much from the little boy at the beginning of the movie, then the hippies in the 70s with the long beard and the long hair and then older again". This role marked his first portrayal of an openly gay character and earned him widespread critical acclaim. He was also nominated for best actor as Frantz (2016), as Mathieu Vasseur in Boîte noire (2022) and in the title role of Le Comte de Monte-Cristo (2025).

In preparation for films, for Frantz he learnt German and playing the violin, and for Sauver ou périr undertook daily training for fire-fighters for four months, gaining nine kilos in muscles for his leading role as Franck, a fireman.

In 2024, Niney portrayed Edmond Dantès in the film The Count of Monte Cristo, a major hit at the box-office The Sight and Sound reviewer commented that in "the casting of Pierre Niney ...as its vengeful, oft-disguised hero Edmond Dantès", Niney, "Not an actor previously inclined toward macho derring-do, [] has a haunted, slightly fey chill that works rather well for a character whose elaborate project of retribution ...can tip over into perversely obsessive territory. As played by Niney, ...this Dantès is sympathetic but never fully readable". He also starred in Fiasco, a 7-episode comedy miniseries that he co-created and co-wrote with Igor Gotesman for Netflix. Late that year it was announced that Niney will be collaborating with the team from The Count of Monte Cristo for an ambitious new adaptation of Maurice Druon's The Accursed Kings novels. The series takes place during the 14th century succession crisis among the Capetian dynasty but Niney's role was not disclosed upon announcement.

== Personal life ==
Since 2008, Niney has been in a relationship with Australian actress and photographer Natasha Andrews, with whom he has two daughters: Lola, born in 2017 and Billie, born in 2019.

== Filmography ==
Key
| † | Denotes works that have not yet been released |

=== Film ===
| Year | Title | Role | Notes |
|---|---|---|---|
| 2007 | La Consolation | François | Short film |
| 2008 | Nos 18 ans | Loïc | |
| 2008 | LOL (Laughing Out Loud) | Julien | |
| 2009 | The Army of Crime | Henri Keltekian | |
| 2009 | Réfractaire | Armand | |
| 2010 | Romantics Anonymous | Ludo | |
| 2010 | La fonte des glaces | Gabriel | Short film |
| 2011 | The Snows of Kilimanjaro | Waiter at the bar | |
| 2011 | 18 Years Old and Rising | Primo Bramsi | Nominated – César Award for Most Promising Actor |
| 2012 | Just Like Brothers | Maxime | Nominated – César Award for Most Promising Actor; Nominated – Lumière Award for Best Male Revelation |
| 2013 | It Boy | Balthazar Apfel | Cabourg Film Festival Award for Best Actor |
| 2014 | Yves Saint Laurent | Yves Saint Laurent | César Award for Best Actor; Globes de Cristal Award for Best Actor; Nominated – Lumière Award for Best Actor |
| 2015 | A Perfect Man | Mathieu Vasseur | |
| 2015 | Inside Out | Fear | French dub |
| 2016 | Altamira | Paul Ratier | |
| 2016 | Five | Samuel | |
| 2016 | Frantz | Adrien | Nominated – César Award for Best Actor; Nominated – Globes de Cristal Award for Best Actor |
| 2016 | The Odyssey | Philippe Cousteau | |
| 2017 | Promise at Dawn | Romain Gary | |
| 2018 | Through the Fire | Pasquier | |
| 2019 | Someone, Somewhere | Mathieu Bernard | |
| 2020 | Lovers | Simon | |
| 2021 | OSS 117: Alerte Rouge en Afrique Noire | OSS 1001 | |
| 2021 | Black Box | Mathieu Vasseur | Nominated – César Award for Best Actor |
| 2022 | Goliath | Mathias Rozen | |
| 2022 | Masquerade | Adrien Saillard | |
| 2023 | The Book of Solutions | Marc | |
| 2024 | The Count of Monte Cristo | Edmond Dantès | Nominated – César Award for Best Actor |
| 2024 | Maya, Give Me a Title | Narrator | |
| 2025 | Guru | Mathieu Vasseur | |

=== Television ===
| Year | Title | Role | Notes |
|---|---|---|---|
| 2007 | La dame d'Izieu | Théo Reis | Miniseries; 2 episodes |
| 2009 | Folie douce | Arnaud | Television film |
| 2010 | L'autre monde | Yann | |
| 2010 | Les Diamants de la victoire | Boivin de Bièvre | Television film |
| 2010 | Marion Mazzano | Yann Vérac | Main cast; 6 episodes |
| 2013 | Casting(s) | Himself | Main cast; also co-creator and writer |
| 2020 | La Flamme | Dr. Bruno Juiphe | 4 episodes |
| 2022 | Le Flambeau, les aventuriers de Chupacabra | Dr. Bruno Juiphe | 4 episodes |
| 2024 | Fiasco | Raphaël Valande | Main role |

== Accolades ==
| Year | Awards | Category | Work | Result | Ref. |
|---|---|---|---|---|---|
| 2012 | César Award | Most Promising Actor | 18 Years Old and Rising | Nominated | |
| 2013 | César Award | Most Promising Actor | Just Like Brothers | Nominated | |
| 2013 | Lumière Awards | Most Promising Actor | Just Like Brothers | Nominated | |
| 2015 | Lumière Awards | Best Actor | Yves Saint Laurent | Nominated | |
| 2015 | César Award | Best Actor | Yves Saint Laurent | Won | |
| 2015 | Globes de Cristal Award | Best Actor | Yves Saint Laurent | Won | |
| 2024 | French Association of Series Critics Awards | Best Performance | Fiasco | Nominated | |
