= Scènes de ménages =

French television series

- Created by: Alain Kappauf
- Starring: Marion Game; Gérard Hernandez; Valérie Karsenti; Frédéric Bouraly; Audrey Lamy; Loup-Denis Elion; Anne-Élisabeth Blateau; David Mora; Amélie Etasse; Grégoire Bonnet; Claire Chust; Vinnie Dargaud
- Country of origin: France
- No. of seasons: 10
- No. of episodes: 3316

Production
- Running time: 34 minutes

Original release
- Network: M6 (France)
- Release: November 9, 2009 – present

Scènes de ménages ("Household Scenes") is a French television series freely adapted by Alain Kappauf from the Spanish television show Escenas de matrimonio, produced by Francis Duquet. It broadcasts new episodes from Monday to Friday from 8:25 pm to 9:00 pm.

== Cast ==
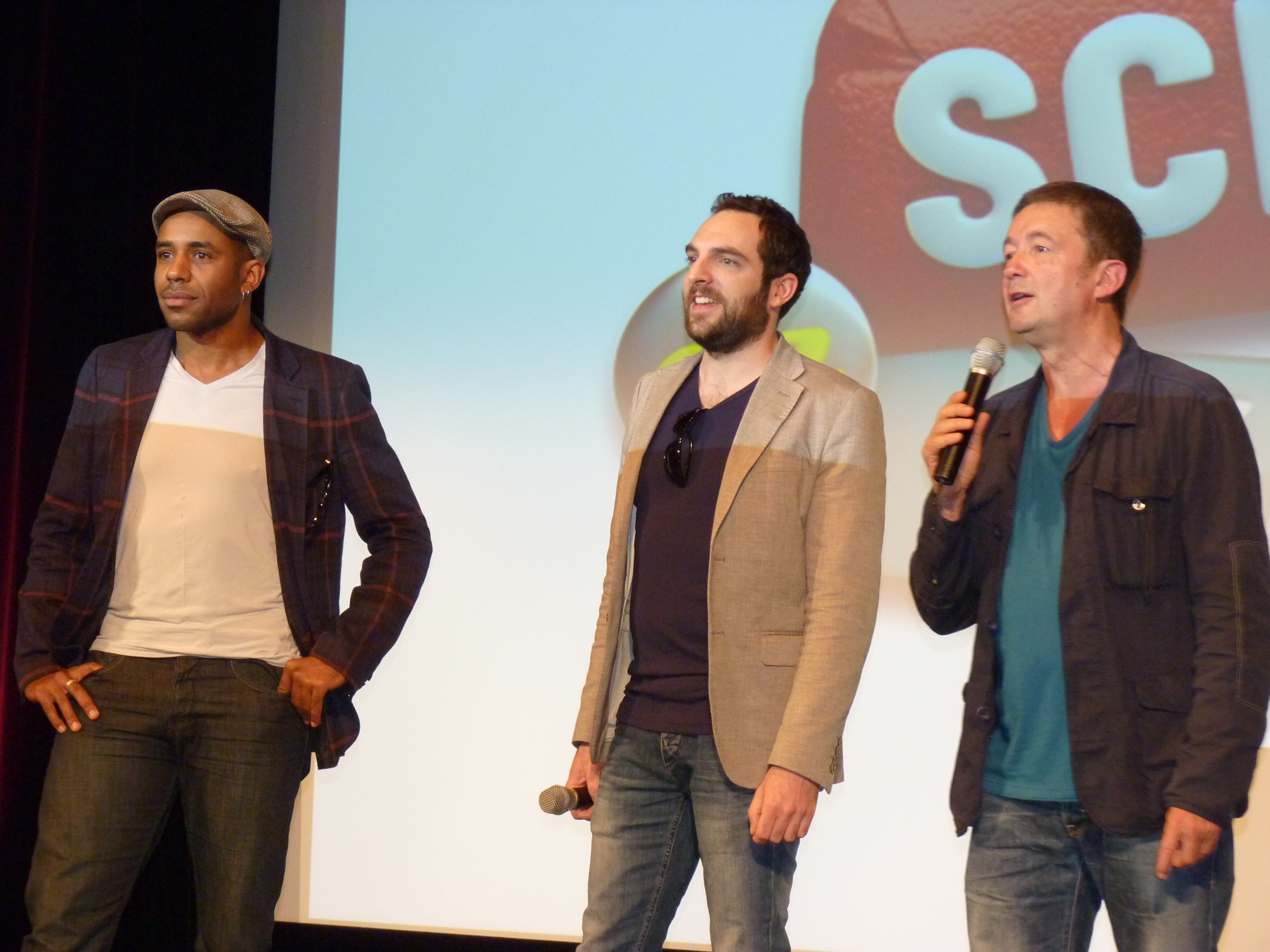
Loup-Denis Elion, David Mora and Frédéric Bouraly, three actors of Scènes de ménages at the 2012 Monte-Carlo Television Festival.

- Marion Game as Huguette (seasons 1-14)
- Gérard Hernandez as Raymond (since season 1)
- Valérie Karsenti as Liliane (since season 1)
- Frédéric Bouraly as José (since season 1)
- Anne-Élisabeth Blateau as Emmanuelle "Emma" (since season 3)
- David Mora as Fabien (since season 3)
- Amélie Etasse as Camille (since season 7)
- Grégoire Bonnet as Philippe (since season 7)
- Claire Chust as Leslie (since season 10)
- Vinnie Dargaud as Léonard "Léo" (since season 10)
- Audrey Lamy as Marion (season 1 to season 9, recurring season 10)
- Loup-Denis Elion as Cédric (season 1 to season 9, recurring season 10)

== Characters ==
=== Huguette and Raymond ===
They are in their seventies. They have a single daughter, Caroline, for whom they have little affection, and two grandchildren, Corentin and Anthony. However, they seem closer to Anthony. Their main character trait is gratuitous malice towards their family or neighbors, often to kill time while they feel bored at home since they retired.

Huguette is an ex-housewife, a bad cook, who spends her time at the market listening to Francoise's gossip, peeling vegetables or knitting in front of television with Raymond.

Raymond is a retired gendarme (French police officer). Raymond never misses an opportunity to make fun of Huguette's cooking. Raymond nicknames Huguette "Ma Poule" ("My honey bun" in English).

The couple has founded a small association with friends, the FLV (Front of liberation of old), with which they federate only six members, but intend well to rise in power to obtain a power of pressure on the decisions of the municipality and on the young people of the square, their worst enemies.

The couple's daily life often comes down to doing bad things and getting rid of mischief. In appearance, they hate each other, but they often combine their efforts to make life impossible for their neighbors, street passers, and sometimes even their friends and family as well as their own daughters. They are also used to spying nearby neighbors with a pair of binoculars and ransacking their mail as well as funeral fun for their friends. They have their little habits that they would not change under any circumstances. Nevertheless, even if they will probably never admit it, they love each other deeply and could do nothing without each other.

In 2023, upon the death of Marion Game, Huguette was killed off leaving Raymond a widower

=== Liliane and José ===
At the beginning of the series, they have been married for more than twenty years but have at least twenty-five years of common life behind them. They have a son, Emmanuel, called "Manu", who left home to work in China. Liliane saw very badly the lack of her son. Liliane and José are learning to live as a couple. They live in a suburban residence.

José is a boy often anguished, lazy, rather primitive, but very nice who works in the service "Sport and youth" of the municipality of his city then mayor (from season 9). One of his characteristics is his ability to ask strange questions at the wrong time, which occupies him for several hours. He tries to develop inventions but they still lack elements, as Liliane regularly points out. José is obsessed by his rivalry with a co-worker, Chamard, who is José's "enemy" who does everything to be better than him.

Liliane is beautician. She is desperate to see her husband lack depth, real attention and psychology to him, to slouch in front of football games, which he is great amateur. Liliane tries to rekindle the romance by erotic games that often turn out badly because of Jose's clumsiness. Liliane is obsessed with her son Manu, refusing to resolve to throw his old business. Liliane suffers from gambling addiction, is a good cook, passionate about Lady Di, and loves plants, which she treats like her children by talking to them.

They often invite their neighbors and acquaintances to dinner, but the evenings often end badly because of Jose's lack of tact.

=== Marion and Cedric ===
Marion and Cedric, in their thirties, share a studio flat. Their love life lasts two years at the beginning of the series.

Cedric is responsible for the crisis management of an Indian company until the beginning of season 8, when he finds himself in the closet and then on short-time work. It is grown and often made known, which annoys Marion. He has a beautiful image of himself, likes to look often in the bathroom mirror and enjoys clothes and chic objects. Cedric practices martial arts. He is a very serious and attentive person but extremely maniac Marion deplores. He also tries to convince Marion to have a child. He assumes all expenses of the couple and is also very stingy, ready to do anything to spend the least money possible.

Before, Marion was a temporary worker. Currently, she resumes her psychology studies. She is very jealous, lazy, narrow-minded, lying, bad-tempered, expensive and sometimes she is very stupid and uneducated, manipulative, and bad-tempered. Marion thinks she is a pop talent and participates in Internet auctions. When she makes mistakes, she always looks for an excuse where blames Cedric. She has a strong character and is quite carefree, she often acts as she sees fit, and never leaves herself to come to blows as at her wedding. Starting in season 7, Marion has her own event company, M Company, which is very successful and brings in a lot of money.

They nickname each other "poussin" ("little honey bun" in English). Their project is to go around the world in seasons 1 to 6. Their main feature is to argue for nothing and to be reconciled thanks to nothing; they are very complicit and have a lot of fun together. They often complain about the small size of their studio, and since Marion agreed to make a child with Cedric, she does not stop believing that he is sterile. They often invite their friends and often organize original and lively parties in their studio, or on the terrace of their building.

=== Emma and Fabien ===
They met in a gym while Fabien was stuck under dumbbells. Emma found it very clumsy but especially very funny. These two city-dwellers, who are opposed to each other, have moved into the countryside by retyping the old barn of Father Bergounioux, who later became their neighbor, to make them their home. Overwhelmed with debt, they have to organize their new life with their daughter Chloé. The couple call each other "chaton" ("kitten" in English).

Emma is a saleswoman at Bricoflex, a DIY store, and she desperately tries to find a talent in the field of pottery, then militant singing and painting. Fabien never fails to remind him how bad it is in these areas. She happens to be passionate about her job, knowing how to handle all the tools, and takes care of the various maintenance of the house. Moreover, she transforms their garden into an artistic dump composed of odds and ends for reuse. Emma has a strong character and gets upset quickly. She also has a particular humor that Fabien seldom understands. Although she loves her daughter a lot, Emma easily pricks her nerves (during which she does not fail to insult Chloe, which Fabien can not bear) when she refuses to sleep, for example.

Fabien is a history-geography professor. He is passionate about motocross, author of a herbarium and recent volunteer firefighter who is often anxious, especially when talking to him about the future of his daughter. A simple rise of stress or emotional shock, even insignificant, is enough to make him faint. Fabien is a hyper-sensitive man and often too caring for his daughter. Unlike Emma, Fabien is doing extremely poorly in the DIY field. For some time, Fabien has a balding start and is trying to find ways to fix it, but that is ruined by Emma's remarks.

=== Camille and Philippe ===
Camille and Philippe have the particularity of being almost twenty years apart (Camille's father is 5 years older than Philippe). They met in the Philip’s pharmacy.

Philippe is a pharmacist who earns a lot of money, and likes to let others know. He is very afraid of being left by Camille and wants to constantly prove to him that he loves her, by doing diets and sports to improve his physical condition. However, he likes to cook a lot and enjoys gourmet cuisine. He owns a yacht and several real estate properties, including a studio occupied by Stephanie, Camille's swept friend who does not pay his rent. He has two children from his union with his ex-wife Isabelle. His son Ulysse, is a sluggish student, constantly reorienting himself, and not really knowing what he wants to do, he completely accepts the union of his father with Camille, and is also very complicit with the latter, he regularly asks for financial support from his father for the most insane projects.

Camille, a yoga teacher, strives to be positive all the time. She has had a lot of adventures with people her age but she finds them too superficial, yet she advises Philippe to help her stay young and avoid her following outdated trends. She says she loves everyone, and has had a lot of conquests, including girls. She has a strange logic that she is the only one to understand and is extremely frank. She does not know how to lie and does not care about the consequences of her words. Unlike Philippe, she is very careful about what she eats and does a lot of sport. She is very sociable and empathetic and displays a very spiritual side.

=== Leslie and Léo ===
Léo and Leslie, lovers for 1 year decide to settle in a kind of warehouse furnished with the means of the edge.

Leo and Leslie are very attached to new technologies that punctuate their lives. Their opposition is also based mainly on Leo's clichés about people living in the suburbs and Leslie's about the children of the rich. They also have their joint venture of customizing t-shirts.

== Guests ==
- Adriana Karembeu
- Alex Lutz
- Alexandra Lamy
- Amel Bent
- Amelle Chahbi
- André Manoukian
- Annie Cordy
- Annie Grégorio
- Antoine Duléry
- Arielle Dombasle
- Armelle
- Bruno Lochet
- Catherine Hosmalin
- Catherine Jacob
- Chantal Ladesou
- Charlotte de Turckheim
- Claude Gensac
- Clémentine Célarié
- Éva Darlan
- Francis Perrin
- François Morel
- Frédérique Bel
- Helena Noguerra
- Isabelle Nanty
- Jean Benguigui
- Jean-Baptiste Maunier
- Jean-Luc Bideau
- Jean-Paul Rouve
- Liliane Rovère
- Lio
- Lionel Abelanski
- Lucien Jean-Baptiste
- Malik Bentalha
- Matt Pokora
- Marianne James
- Marie-Anne Chazel
- Marie-Hélène Lentini
- Marthe Villalonga
- Michèle Bernier
- Noémie Lenoir
- Norman Thavaud
- Pascal Légitimus
- Philippe Duquesne
- Philippe Lacheau
- Philippe Laudenbach
- Palachandiran Thyshaant
- Serge Hazanavicius
- Thierry Lhermitte
- Valérie Mairesse
- Véronique Jannot
- Vincent Desagnat
