= Adam G. Sevani =

American actor, dancer (born 1992)

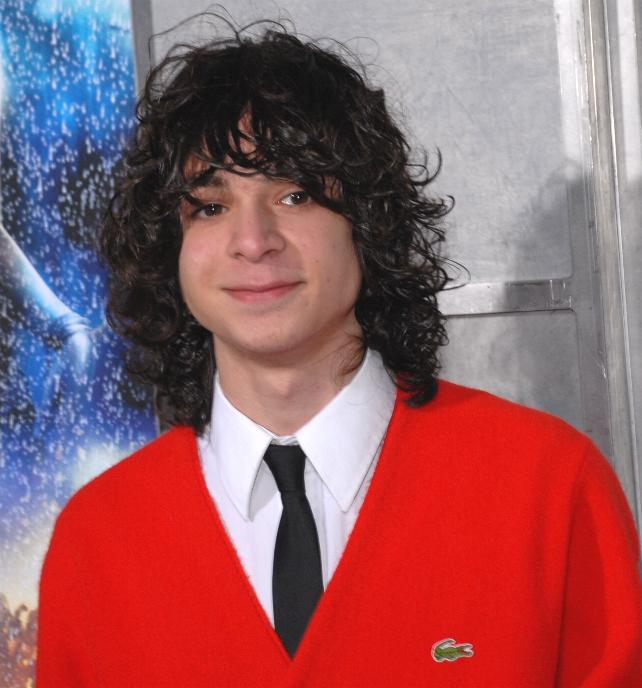
- Sevani at the premiere of Step Up 2: The Streets on February 4, 2008
- Born: Adam Manucharian; June 29, 1992 (age 34); Los Angeles, California, U.S.
- Occupations: Dancer, actor

Adam Manucharian (Armenian: Ադամ Մանուչարյան; born June 29, 1992), known professionally as Adam G. Sevani, is an American actor and dancer, known for playing Robert Alexander III / Moose in the Step Up film series.

== Acting career ==
In February 2008, Sevani appeared in the Touchstone Pictures dance drama film Step Up 2: The Streets, the second installment of the Step Up film series.

The film centered on a group of students who form a dance troupe and battle on the streets. Sevani's performance as Robert "Moose" Alexander III was praised by critics, such as The New York Times, for portraying a character who "might be the baddest nerd in movie history". The film, which received generally mixed reviews, went on to gross over $150 million worldwide. For his role in the film, Sevani received the "Best Scene Stealer" award at the 2008 Young Hollywood Awards. In May 2009 Sevani was confirmed to reprise the role of Moose in the third installment of the Step Up series. Filming took place in New York City on a $30 million budget. The film, Step Up 3D, centers on Moose and his best friend Camille (Alyson Stoner) moving to New York to start University until Sevani's character gets mixed up in the underground dance scene. The film was released in August 2010 to generally mixed reviews from critics. As of August 2012, the film is the highest grossing installment of the franchise, with over $159 million worldwide. In July 2012, Sevani made a small appearance in the series' fourth installment, Step Up Revolution. In 2014, Sevani once again reprised his role as Moose in the fifth installment of the Step Up film series, Step Up: All In.

In August 2010, Sevani was confirmed to star in the American remake of the 2008 French film LOL (Laughing Out Loud), alongside Miley Cyrus, Demi Moore, and Ashley Greene. The film centers on Cyrus's character finishing her final year of high school. In May 2012, the film received a limited US release, and was given bad reviews from critics.

== Dancing ==
Sevani has appeared in music videos such as: Mase's "Breathe, Stretch, Shake", Will Smith's "Switch", T-Pain's "Church" and a little part in NLT's "That Girl." He also did the choreography for NLT's music video for "Karma." He is credited as a back-up dancer for Kevin Federline's performance on the Teen Choice Awards in 2006. Adam also formed a dance crew with Jon Chu and several California area dancers with celebrity cameos in 2008 known as the AC/DC, or Adam/Chu Dance Crew. The crew had a highly publicized YouTube dance battle with Miley Cyrus. The battle ended with a final dance off between the two crews at the 2008 Teen Choice Awards. In November 2008, he was featured in a tribute video to Michael Jackson's 25th Anniversary Thriller video, with Step Up series co-star Alyson Stoner.

== Filmography ==
Year	Title	Role	Notes
2002	The Emperor's Club	St. Benedict Student	
2003	Learn to Hip Hop: Volume 2	Himself [Not Shown]	
2005	FLY KIDZ	Joey / Adam	
2007	Superbad	Izen	Deleted scene
2008	Step Up 2: The Streets	Robert "Moose" Alexander III	
2009	Rob Dyrdek's Fantasy Factory	Himself	
2010	Step Up 3D	Robert "Moose" Alexander III	
2012	Step Up Revolution	Robert "Moose" Alexander III	Special Appearance
2012	The First Time	Wurtzheimer Guy	
2012	LOL	Wen	
2014	Step Up: All In	Robert "Moose" Alexander III	
2018	Lucifer	Pastrami boy / Brandon	Episode: "The Last Heartbreak"
2019	Wonder Park	Additional Voices	

== See also ==
- List of dancers
