= Année Zéro =

French-Belgian television crime drama series

- Also known as: Echo, Start Over
- Genre: Crime drama, science fiction
- Created by: Céleste Balin, Maxime Crupaux
- Written by: Céleste Balin; Maxime Crupaux; Gaëlle Baron; Céline Dréan; Germain Huard; Cécile Leclère
- Directed by: Olivier Barma
- Starring: Claire Keim; Émilie Dequenne; Marc Riso; Marc Ruchmann; Éric Caravaca
- Music by: Laurent Aknin
- Country of origin: France
- Original language: French
- No. of seasons: 1
- No. of episodes: 4

Production
- Running time: 48–52 minutes

Original release
- Network: M6

Année Zéro (French for 'Year Zero'), alternatively titled Start Over in English-speaking countries, is a French-Belgian TV crime drama and science fiction television series created by Céleste Balin and Maxime Crupaux, and directed by Olivier Barma. Alongside Balin and Crupaux, scriptwriters are Gaëlle Baron, Céline Dréan, Germain Huard and Cécile Leclère. The series stars Éric Caravaca as cardiac surgeon Marc, Claire Keim as his ex-wife Anna, Marc Riso as ambulance driver Cédric, and Émilie Dequenne as Juliette, a police lieutenant. Marc Ruchmann portrays Simon, Anna's clandestine lover and Marc's colleague. Année Zéro's four episodes were broadcast from 3 January 2023 via M6.

== Premise ==
On 31 December 2023, Marc is found murdered in his former office – he had been dismissed after several suspicious patient deaths. Marc's ex-wife Anna, his friend Cédric and Juliette, a police lieutant whose husband died after being operated on by Marc, are mysteriously taken back a year inside a lift. They find Marc celebrating New Year's Day 2023 with his colleagues in the hospital. Back home, Cédric notices there is no trace of his fiancée, Margot, whom he met on Valentine's Day 2023. Juliette is happy reunited with her husband, Karim who is still alive. Anna and Cédric decide to identify Marc's killer. Juliette, reluctant at first, agrees to join them. Each of their decisions changes the year 2023 they had already lived.

== Cast and characters ==
- Claire Keim as Anna Honoré: Provence General Hospital psychiatrist, Marc's ex-wife
- Émilie Dequenne as Juliette Kharoub: police lieutenant, Karim's wife
- Marc Riso as Cédric Giraud: hospital ambulance driver/paramedic, Marc's friend
- Marc Ruchmann as Simon Legendre: surgeon, Marc's protégé, Anna's lover
- Éric Caravaca as Marc Honoré: head cardiac surgeon, Anna's ex-husband
- Foëd Amara as Karim Kharoub: Juliette's husband, gambler; becomes gravedigger
- Loup-Denis Elion as Stéphane Iannucci: police officer, Juliette's colleague
- Elisa Erka as Margot de Michelis: aspirant dancer, Cédric's girlfriend, wheel-chair bound after traffic collision
- Paul Mauch as Pavel: aspirant dancer, Margot's sometime boyfriend
- Sofia Roser as Inès Kharoub: Juliette's ten-year-old daughter
- Pierre Laplace as Robert: hospital's security guard
- Guillaume Bursztyn as Monsieur Marty (English: Mr Marty): grateful patient, chicken farmer
- Gérard Dubouche as Commandant (English: Commander): Juliette, Stéphane's boss

== Production ==
Année Zéro was created by Céleste Balin and Maxime Crupaux, who co-wrote its four episodes with Gaëlle Baron, Céline Dréan, Germain Huard and Cécile Leclère. The director for the series is Olivier Barma. Filming occurred in mid-2022 under the working title, Echo, for M6. Initial filming used southern France locations at Aix-en-Provence, Marseille, and La Ciotat; while later material was shot in the Paris region.

A disused wing of the Centre Hospitalier Robert Ballanger (Robert Ballanger Hospital Centre)) in Aulnay-sous-Bois, was used for scenes depicting the fictitious Provence General Hospital's cardiology department. Barma explained, "We have planned two elevators – one here and another at the Faculty of Sciences in Orsay where we shot the end of the scene, when the three characters get out of the elevator." Claire Keim joined the cast due to its script: "I found the script very original, compared to everything I usually read... I was really surprised, it's bold, it looks like the Anglo-Saxon series that I love. It's a step further than what we're used to seeing in French fiction."

== Episode guide ==
No. in season	Title	Directed by	Written by	Original release date
1	"Episode 1" (Épisode 1)	Olivier Barma	Céleste Balin, Maxime Crupaux, Gaëlle Baron, Céline Dréan	3 January 2023
31 December 2023: Anna and Simon kiss. Cédric and Margot become engaged. Juliette, Inès remember Karim's death. Juliette enters hospital. Marc phones Anna: found patients' killer. Juliette hears shot upstairs, orders receptionist: phone police. Anna sees Juliette, Simon stand behind Marc's corpse. Juliette, Anna, Cédric enter lift. Anna has panic attack; lift jars to stop, restarts. 1 January 2023: Upon exiting, people celebrate New Year. Marc dances with colleagues. Cédric collects newly hatched chick; at home: no sign of Margot. Karim welcomes Juliette home. Anna avoids Simon. Anna to Cédric: must find Marc's killer. Juliette promises Commander: increased crime-solving rate. Juliette to Anna: Karim died on 2 January; Marc operated. Marc asks Anna to show Simon studio room. Flashback: Juliette arrives in hospital; Marc: Karim's dead. Present: Juliette prevents Karim driving to racetrack. Cédric meets Margot, who leaves with Pavel. Anna refuses Simon's advances. Juliette finds Karim collapsed: begins CPR. At hospital, Juliette fails to prevent Marc operating. Marc: Karim's recovering. Karim apologises for gambling. Marc: female patient died. Cédric "accidentally" encounters Margot. She believes Cédric's stalking her. Anna, Cédric support Marc over dead patient. Simon provides wine for Anna, Marc. Juliette agrees to join Anna, Cédric's search for Marc's killer.
2	"Episode 2" (Épisode 2)	Olivier Barma	Céleste Balin, Maxime Crupaux, Gaëlle Baron, Céline Dréan	3 January 2023
9 February 2023: Juliette has Stéphane wait; cuff robber when he exits. Marc wants to surprise Anna for anniversary, which disrupts Juliette's plan to catch killer. Cédric's neighbour, Carole visits. Flashback: Anna, Marc argue about patient's death. Present: Cédric remembers Margot's Valentine's Day accident. Juliette, Karim bank loan application's refused. Flashback: Juliette, Inès visit Karim's gravesite. They cannot afford gravestone, yet. Present: Cédric, Juliette pressure Anna to swap Simon's shift with Marc, which resets their plan. Flashback: Simon flirts with Anna. Present: Simon's hesitant to agree to Anna's requested swap. Juliette, Karim start selling assets. Cédric, Carole date: disrupted by encountering Margot. Marc arrives to operate on Césari; Simon sports damaged wrist. Cédric asks Robert to see cardiology CCTV; gets rid of Robert. They find Marc attending Césari's recovery. Marc berates them for disruption. Cédric tells Margot: Valentine Day's accident. Flashback: Anna, Simon start affair. Present: Anna cuddles Marc. Juliette, Stéphane arrest drugmakers; Juliette collects cashbag. Flashback: Karim's favourite horse finally wins. Present: Juliette places bet on horse, which wins. Anna, Simon have sex. Flashback: Cédric attends Margot's accident. Present: Cédric steps in front of car, saving Margot. She stays by his side. Simon administers potassium chloride to Césari's drip.
3	"Episode 3" (Épisode 3)	Olivier Barma	Céleste Balin, Maxime Crupaux, Germain Huard, Cécile Leclère	10 January 2023
3 months later: Inquiry concludes: no medical errors. Marc returns to work after suspension. Anna, Simon continue affair. Flashback: Marc's suspension lifted, but Marc quits over patient deaths. Present: Marc: no problems with patient deaths. Cédric's rehabilitation: learning to walk. Simon buys Anna expensive necklace. Juliette promoted to Captain, Stéphane to Lieutenant. Stéphane suspicious of Juliette's recent wealth. Commander to Juliette: who are your informers? Juliette: just hard work. Simon to Marc: Anna has lover; Marc packs clothes, leaves. Karim advises Juliette: let Stéphane solve cases. Anna stalls Simon in their relationship. Juliette redirects thief towards Stéphane, who arrests him. Simon contaminates patient's IV. Simon casts suspicion at Marc to hospital board. Pavel to Cédric: selfishly ruining Margot's career. Stéphane boasts: good criminal catcher. Flashback: Margot redesigns Cédric's flat. Marc moves in. Present: Cédric advises Margot: pursue career in London. Juliette reviews CCTV; discovers Anna, Simon's affair. Juliette accuses Anna of killing patients; Stéphane releases Anna. Commander suspends Juliette for improper conduct. Cédric rebuffs Margot. Juliette conceals suspension from family. Cédric confronts Simon, who claims Anna started affair. Simon gives Cédric cooked chicken. Simon, Anna have sex. Cédric leaves message for Anna: Simon's killer, also travelled back in time.
4	"Episode 4" (Épisode 4)	Olivier Barma	Céleste Balin, Maxime Crupaux, Germain Huard, Cécile Leclère	10 January 2023
Day later: Anna, Simon kiss in lift, which jolts to stop. Lift restarts, Simon, Anna exit into empty foyer. Banner reads 2024. Cédric: Marc's alive in OR. Juliette arrests Simon for attempted murder. Cédric cannot hold himself up, collapses. Simon realises their sham; denies accusations. Juliette releases Simon. Robert returns people to foyer. Marc confronts Simon, who admits to affair, but denies killings. Flashback: Anna, Marc sign divorce papers. Present: Marc arrested by Stéphane after potassium chloride found in his office. Anna poisoned via her drinker. Police take Juliette, Marc away. Simon tends Anna. Orderlies block Cédric. Simon dismisses personnel, gloats as Anna succumbs. Flashback: Juliette, Stéphane have sex. Present: Juliette describes Stéphane's birthmark. Stéphane brings Marc to Simon, Anna. Simon stabs Stéphane, takes police gun. Juliette drives after Simon. Marc and team operate on Anna. Juliette follows Simon to Alice's grave. Karim stops Simon suiciding. Simon: Marc killed Alice. Simon points gun at Karim, but Stéphane shoots Simon, dead. Marc saves Anna's life. Juliette reinstated. Cédric and Margot reconcile; Pavel leaves. 7 months later: Anna, Marc, Cédric, Margot, Juliette, Karim celebrate New Years Eve. Marc, Anna kiss. At midnight, lights blackout; when lights return, Marc's disappeared.
