= Loup-Denis Elion =

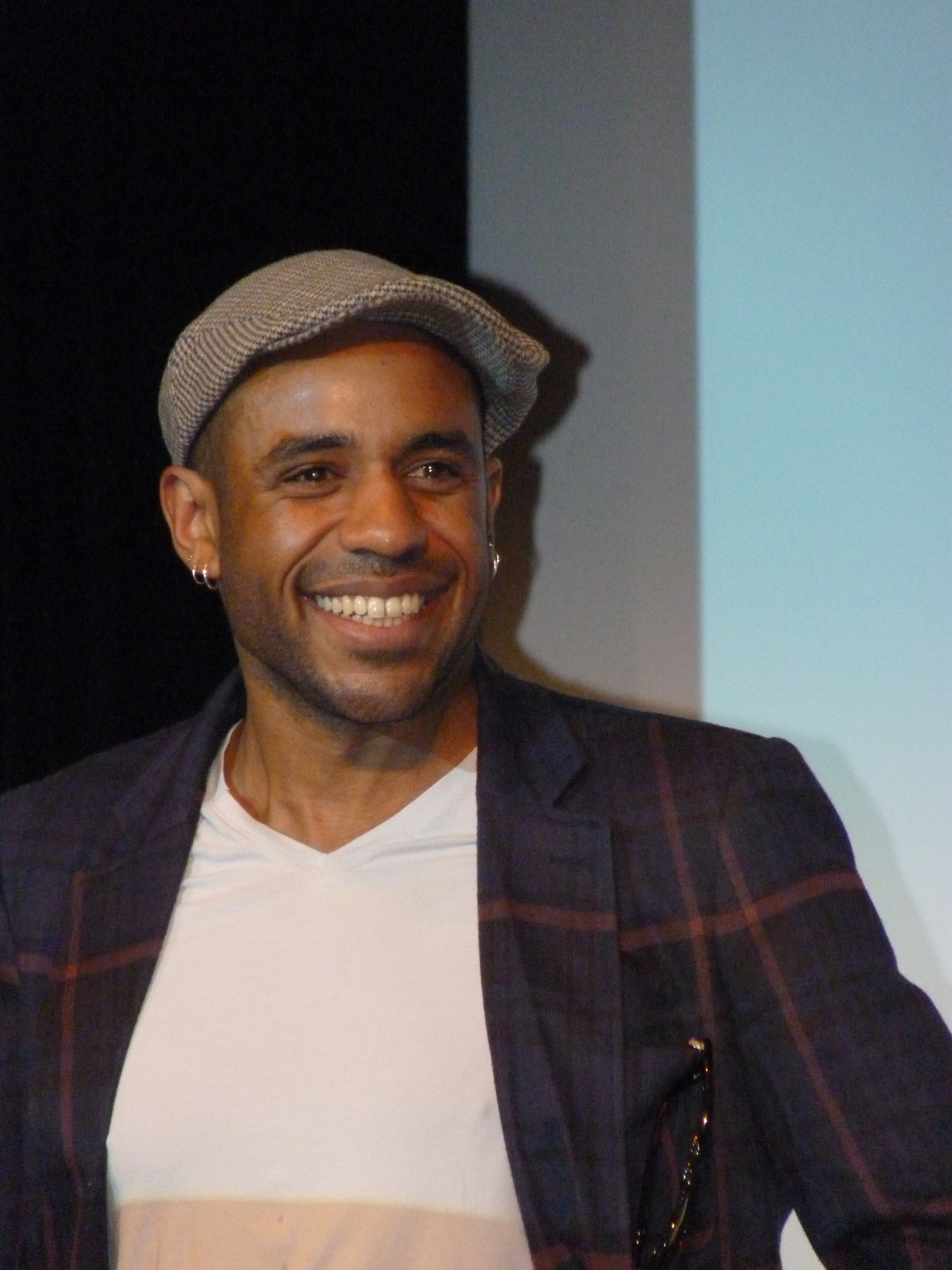
- Born: 9 September 1979 (age 46); Fontenay-aux-Roses, France
- Occupations: Actor, Singer
- Years active: 2002–present

Loup-Denis Elion (born 9 September 1979) is a French actor and singer.

== Theater ==
Year	Title	Author
2002	Twelfth Night	William Shakespeare
2005	Oedipus Rex	Sophocles
2007	Le Masque de lune	Loup-Denis Elion
2008	Brundibár	Hans Krása
2009	Die Frau ohne Schatten	Richard Strauss
2012	Karaoké	Les Cris de Paris
2013-15	Open Space	Mathilda May

== Filmography ==
Year	Title	Role	Director	Notes
2005	Apparences	Siméon	Thierry Boscheron	Short
2006	Le comité de la claque	The man	Vladimir Rodionov & Avril Tembouret	Short; Also Producer
2009	Krach		Thierry Boscheron (2)	Short
2009	Nous ne sommes pas des saints	Gabriel	Nicolas Ragni	TV series (3 episodes)
2009–2018	Scènes de ménages	Cédric	Francis Duquet, Varante Soudjian, ...	TV series (3 316 episodes)
2010	La Folle Histoire du Palmashow	Various	Jonathan Barré	TV series (1 episode)
2011	Milk Shake TV	Denis	Vladimir Rodionov (2)	TV movie Also Writer
2011	Le ciné du Comité	Various	Vladimir Rodionov (3)	TV series (1 episode); Also Writer
2011	Les geeks	The dealer	Vladimir Rodionov (4)	TV series (1 episode)
2011	La Caverne	Borgne	Vladimir Rodionov (5)	TV series (20 episodes); Also Writer
2012	Yes We Can	Mickael	Olivier Abbou	TV movie
2012	Les mains de Roxana	Eric Almeida	Philippe Setbon	TV movie
2015	Enfin en vacances, à la mer	Cédric	Karim Adda & Francis Duquet (2)	TV movie
2015	Envers et contre tous		Thierry Binisti	TV movie
2015	Ma pire angoisse	Marco	Vladimir Rodionov (6)	TV series (1 episode)
2015	Mes chers disparus !	Georges	Stéphane Kappes	TV series (6 episodes)
2016	Moule-Bite	Jean Eudes	Louis Hanoteau	Short
2016	Enfin en vacances, à la campagne	Cédric	Karim Adda (2) & Francis Duquet (3)	TV movie
2023	Année Zéro	Stéphane Iannucci	Olivier Barma	TV series (4 episodes)
