= Ashes and Blood =

2009 film

- Promotional poster
- Directed by: Fanny Ardant
- Written by: Fanny Ardant; Ismail Kadare
- Produced by: Paulo Branco; Tudor Giurgiu
- Starring: Ronit Elkabetz
- Cinematography: Gérard de Battista
- Edited by: Célia Lafitedupont
- Release date: May 2009
- Running time: 105 minutes
- Countries: France; Romania; Portugal
- Languages: French; Romanian

Ashes and Blood (French: Cendres et sang) is a 2009 internationally co-produced drama film directed by Fanny Ardant. It was given a special screening at the 2009 Cannes Film Festival.

== Plot ==
A widow, Judith returns to Marseille with her children for the wedding of her sister-in-law. Judith's husband was murdered in a vendetta-killing a decade earlier. In keeping with the Greek tragedy tradition of the film, violent family rivalries unravel with fatal consequences.

== Cast ==
- Ronit Elkabetz as Judith
- Abraham Belaga as Pashko
- Marc Ruchmann as Ismaël
- Claire Bouanich as Mira
- Fanny Ardant
- Zoltán Butuc as Fiancé de Judith
- Mădălina Constantin
- Oana Pellea
- Olga Tudorache
- Răzvan Vasilescu
- Ion Besoiu

== Reception ==
Libération described it as "stunning, magnificent, beautiful and dazzling". The newspaper also remarked it was a remarkable achievement for a directorial debut, continuing to praise the strength of the cinematography. The newspaper also praised the casting, "the great Ronit Elkabetz is a tremendous credit, as well as the Romanian revelation, Mădălina Constantin."
