= Jérémy Kapone =

French actor and singer-songwriter

- Born: 16 April 1990 (age 34); Douarnenez, France
- Occupation(s): Actor, model, singer, songwriter
- Years active: 2008–2011

Jérémy Kapone (born 16 April 1990) is a French actor, model, singer and songwriter, best known for his role in the French film LOL (Laughing Out Loud) as Maël.

He was a member of the band Kaponz & Spinoza and also wrote a song (Exil) for the movie LOL (Laughing Out Loud). He pursues a solo career with an EP, "Aquarium", which was released in May 2016.

== Filmography ==
=== Films ===
Year	Title	Role	Notes
2008	LOL (Laughing Out Loud)	Maël	Film
2010	Accomplices	Thomas	Film
2011	Livid	Ben	Film
2012	Measuring the World	Aimé Bonpland	

=== Television ===
Year	Title	Role	Notes
2009	Miradas 2	Himself	TV series documentary
2009	Le grand journal de Canal+	Himself	TV series
2010	Le grand restaurant	Alexandre	TV movie
2011	Le grand restaurant II	Alexandre	TV movie
2011	Summer Knows	Boy	short film

== Accolades ==
- Festival du Film de Cabourg : « Swann d'Or » Most Promising Male Newcomer 2009 for LOL.
