= Tout, tout de suite =

- Theatrical release poster
- Directed by: Richard Berry
- Screenplay by: Richard Berry; Morgan Sportès
- Based on: Tout, tout de suite by Morgan Sportès
- Produced by: Thomas Langmann; Alain Goldman
- Starring: Marc Ruchmann; Steve Achiepo; Romane Rauss; Richard Berry
- Cinematography: Jean-Paul Agostini
- Edited by: Mickael Dumontier
- Music by: Harry Escott
- Production companies: Légende Films; La Petite Reine Production
- Distributed by: Légende Distribution
- Release date: 11 May 2016 (France)
- Running time: 111 minutes
- Countries: France; Luxembourg; Belgium
- Language: French
- Budget: €7.4 million
- Box office: $64,000

Tout, tout de suite is a 2016 crime thriller-drama film directed by Richard Berry. The film is a co-production between France, Luxembourg and Belgium. Written by Richard Berry and Morgan Sportès, it is based on a novel by Sportès which was in turn inspired by the events of the Affair of the Gang of Barbarians in 2006. The film was released on 11 May 2016.

== Cast ==
- Marc Ruchmann as Ilan Halimi
- Steve Achiepo as Youssouf Fofana
- Romane Rauss as Zelda
- Richard Berry as Didier Halimi
- Idit Cebula as Judith Halimi
- Pascale Louange as psychologist
- Morgane Nairaud as Agnès
- Hedi Bouchenafa as sniper
- Matila Malliarakis as Suze
- Djibril Gueye as Cappuccino
