= Marc Ruchmann =

French actor, director and musician (born 1981)

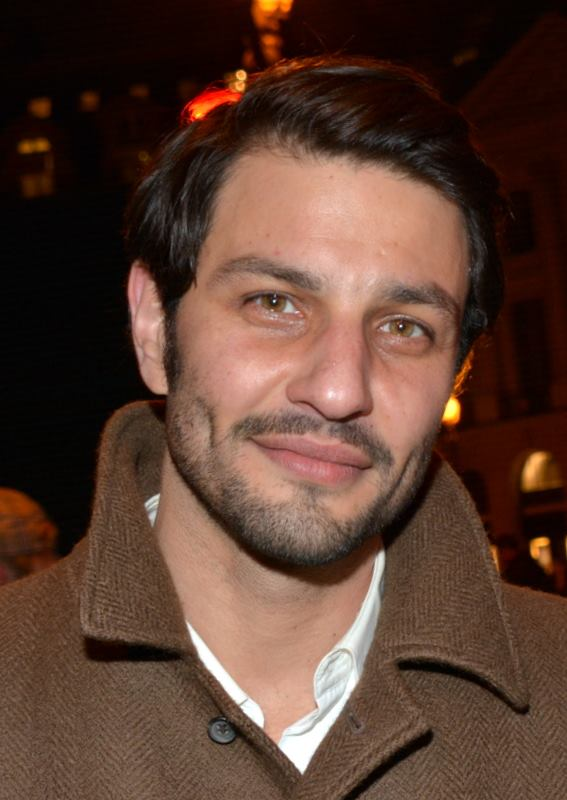
- Marc Ruchmann in 2017
- Born: 27 January 1981 (age 45); Les Lilas, Seine-Saint-Denis, France
- Occupations: Actor, director, musician
- Partner(s): Leïla Nsairi (2017-present); Sarah Marx
- Children: Ismaël (born March 25, 2013)

Marc Ruchmann (born 27 January 1981 in Les Lilas, Seine-Saint-Denis) is a French actor, director and musician.

== Biography ==
Ruchmann is of Alsatian Jewish and Pied-Noir-Italian descent. Ruchmann trained at the Conservatoire de Paris between 1998 and 2000. He continued with classes at Théâtre national de Chaillot. He was given his first feature film role in François Ozon's 5x2. In 2009 he appeared in the Arte French-Israeli mini-series, Revivre about the founding of the State of Israel following the Holocaust. In the same year he appeared alongside the late Ronit Elkabetz in Fanny Ardant's directorial debut, Ashes and Blood.

He also acted alongside Hollywood actresses Angelina Jolie and Sharon Stone in The Tourist (2010) and Largo Winch II (2011) respectively. In 2015 he directed the short film, Who Am I After Your Exile in Me? about a love affair between an Israeli Jewish woman and a Palestinian Arab Muslim man. In 2016 he appeared in Tout, tout de suite as the hate-crime victim, Ilan Halimi. Halimi's murder was described by Haaretz as "the most brutal attack on a European Jew since WW2." In 2017 he appeared in the Netflix series, The Chalet and is currently appearing in a new Netflix project, The Hook Up Plan where he plays a male escort.

As a singer he performs under the pseudonym Markus. He has also appeared as an actor in music videos for other artists. Appearing in "Orders and Degrees" by Peter von Poehl and "Club 27" by Les Fils du Calvaire.

== Filmography ==
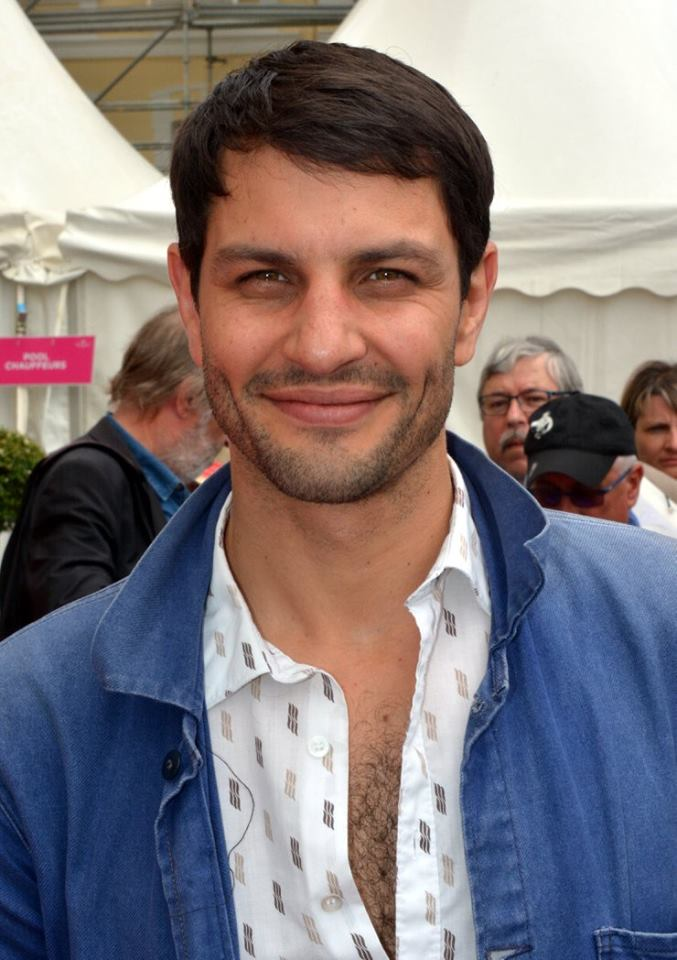
Marc Ruchmann in 2018

Year	Title	Role	Notes
2004	5x2	Mathieu	
2005	Alex Santana, négociateur	Yvan Canivez	Episode: L'affaire bordier
2006	Ange de Feu	Alex Bernard	TV film
2006	Effusion de Sang	Le graffer	Short film
2006	L'état de Grace		TV film
2007	Fort comme un homme	Chen	TV film
2007	Ali Baba et les Quarante Voleurs	Sliman	TV film
2007	Operation Turquoise	Le quartier-maître chef Morvan	TV film
2008	Adrien	Adrien	TV film
2008	X Femmes	Jeune homme / Young man	TV series
2009	Ashes and Blood	Ismaël	
2009	Revivre	Ashriel Elbaz	Mini-series regular
2010	Dom Juan sur seine		
2010	The Tourist	Brigadier Kaiser	
2011	Largo Winch II	Brian	
2011	Skylab	Tonton Loulou	
2011	Demain ?	Reys	
2011	Bien au-delà	Fred	Short film
2012	Éléonore l'intrépide	Renaud	
2012	The Maneater	Le père David	
2013	For a Woman	Paul	
2013	Lucille in the Sky	Le père David	Short film
2013	Les Limiers	Sam Ribeiro / Sami Belkacem	Series regular
2016	Tout, tout de suite	Ilan Halimi	
2016	In Bed with Victoria	Coup d'un soir 2	
2016	Addict		TV series
2016	Loin de chez nous	Hassan	
2017	Loue-moi !	Raphaël	
2017–2018	The Chalet	Manu Laverne	Series regular
2018-2022	Photo de famille	Stéphane	
2018-2022	The Hook Up Plan	Jules	Series regular
2023	Année Zéro	Simon Legendre	TV series, main cast
