= Johan Libéreau =

French actor (born 1984)

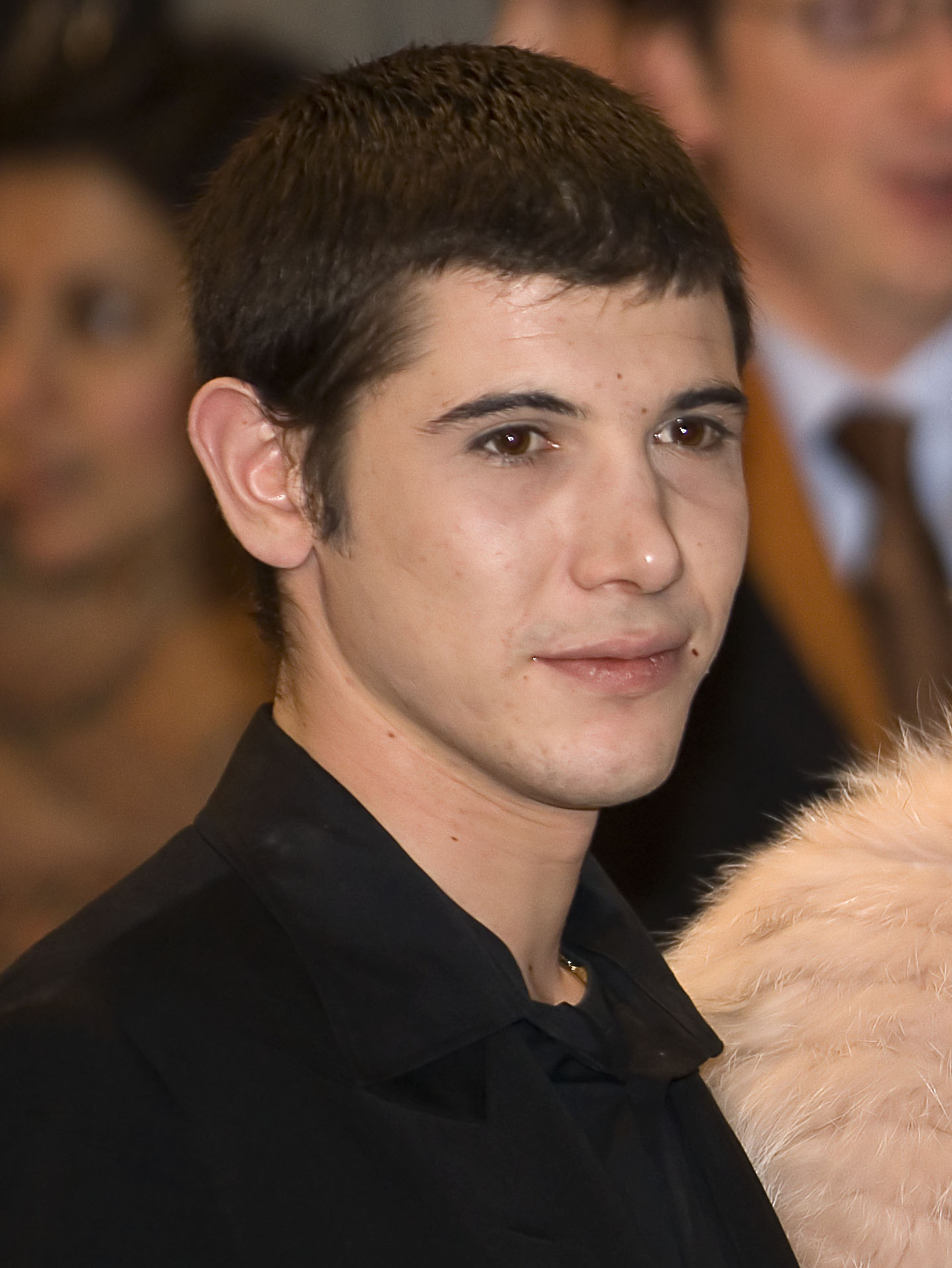
- Libéreau in 2007
- Born: 27 September 1984 (age 42); Paris, France
- Occupation: Actor
- Years active: 2003–present

Johan Libéreau (born 27 September 1984) is a French actor. He was an apprentice pastry chef and waiter, before being spotted by an agent.

== Filmography ==
- 2003: Tais-toi! as Adolescent 2
- 2004: Julie Lescaut episode "Sans pardon" as Michel
- 2005: Cold showers as Mickael
- 2006: In the forefront
- 2007: The Witnesses as Manu
- 2008: Un cœur simple
- 2008: Stella
- 2009: Je te mangerais
- 2009: Vertigo
- 2011: Q
- 2011: 18 Years Old and Rising
- 2011: Twiggy
- 2012: Sister
- 2013: Grand Central
- 2013: 11.6
- 2015: Cosmos
- 2017: The Faithful Son
