= Let's Dance (2007 film) =

- Film poster
- Directed by: Noémie Lvovsky
- Written by: Noémie Lvovsky; Florence Seyvos
- Produced by: Ruth Waldburger; Martine Cassinelli; Pascal Caucheteux; Grégoire Joilute
- Starring: Jean-Pierre Marielle; Valeria Bruni Tedeschi; Sabine Azéma; Bulle Ogier
- Cinematography: Jean-Marc Fabre
- Edited by: Emmanuelle Castro
- Music by: Archie Shepp
- Production companies: Why Not Productions; UGC Images; France 2 Cinéma; Vega Film; Télévision Suisse Romande
- Distributed by: UGC Distribution
- Release date: 14 November 2007
- Running time: 100 minutes
- Countries: France; Switzerland
- Language: French
- Budget: $5.6 million
- Box office: $3.1 million

Let's Dance (French: Faut que ça danse !) is a 2007 French-Swiss film directed by Noémie Lvovsky and written by Lvovsky and Florence Seyvos. The film received 3 César Award nominations.

== Cast ==
- Jean-Pierre Marielle as Salomon Bellinsky
- Valeria Bruni Tedeschi as Sarah Bellinsky
- Sabine Azéma as Violette
- Bulle Ogier as Geneviève Bellinsky
- Bakary Sangaré as M. Mootoosamy
- Arié Elmaleh as François
- John Arnold as Adolf Hitler
- Anne Alvaro as Marie-Hélène
- Tsilla Chelton as Tatiana
- Nicolas Maury as Client Manager
- Daniel Emilfork as Army medical officer
- Judith Chemla as Female student
- Cécile Reigher as Nurse
- Michel Fau as Psychiatrist
- Jutta Sammel as Sarah, age 8
- Michele Gleizer as Gynaecologist
- Philippe Nagau as Tap-dancing instructor
- Rosette as Secretary

== Accolades ==
- César Awards (France)
  - Nominated: Best Actor – Leading Role (Jean-Pierre Marielle)
  - Nominated: Best Actress – Supporting Role (Bulle Ogier)
  - Nominated: Best Music Written for a Film (Archie Shepp)
