= LOL (Laughing Out Loud) =

LOL (Laughing Оut Loud)
- French theatrical release poster
- Directed by: Lisa Azuelos
- Written by: Lisa Azuelos; Delgado Nans
- Produced by: Lisa Azuelos
- Starring: Sophie Marceau; Christa Theret; Jérémy Kapone
- Cinematography: Nathaniel Aron
- Edited by: Stan Collet
- Music by: Jean-Philippe Verdin
- Production companies: TF1 Films; M6 Films; Canal+
- Distributed by: Pathé
- Release dates: 27 October 2008 (Rome); 4 February 2009 (France)
- Running time: 98 minutes
- Country: France
- Language: French
- Budget: $10.2 million
- Box office: $32.8 million

LOL (Laughing Out Loud) is a 2008 French comedy film directed by Lisa Azuelos and starring Sophie Marceau, Christa Theret, and Alexandre Astier. The film is written by Azuelos and Delgado Nans, about a teenage girl whose life is split between her studies in a Parisian high school, her secret diary, her parents, her friends, and her boyfriends. Christa Theret received a César Award nomination for Most Promising Actress in 2010. The movie is heavily inspired by La Boum, which starred Marceau as the teenage character. After the film's great success, several actors from the cast took part in Fort Boyard in 2009, a French TV show aimed at raising money for an association.

== Plot ==
Lola is a teenage girl living with her mother Anne, who is divorced from Lola's father, Alain. Nicknamed 'LOL' by her friends, Lola has been taking her first steps into teenage romance, dating a boy from her class named Arthur. Following the summer break, Arthur tells her that he cheated on her over the summer and was dating one of her friends. Lola decides to break things off with him, and starts seeing his close friend, Maël. Lola's friends seem to enjoy complicating matters even more. But life at home has also become impossible with her mother, Anne. Lola attempts to play her mother and her father Alain off against each other for her advantage, but what she doesn't know is that Anne and Alain have begun dating again on the sly. After a class trip to England, her relationship with her mother comes crashing down.

== Cast ==
- Sophie Marceau as Anne
- Christa Theret as Lola
- Alexandre Astier as Alain
- Jérémy Kapone as Maël
- Marion Chabassol as Charlotte
- Lou Lesage as Stéphane
- Émile Bertherat as Paul-Henri
- Félix Moati as Arthur
- Louis Sommer as Mehdi
- Adèle Choubard as Provence
- Jade-Rose Parker as Isabelle de Peyrefitte
- Warren Guetta as David Lévy
- Jocelyn Quivrin as Lucas
- Françoise Fabian as Anne's mother
- Christiane Millet as Charlotte's mother
- Lise Lamétrie as The CPE
- Thaïs Alessandrin as Louise
- Tom Invernizzi as Théo
- Stéphanie Murat as Cathy
- Laurent Bateau as Romain
- Valérie Karsenti as Laurence
- Pierre Niney as Julien
- Jean-Claude Dauphin as The minister
- Olivier Cruveiller as Maël's father
- Katia Caballero as Maël's mother
- Vincent Jasinskij as Léon
- Patty Hannock as Madame Claude, the English teacher
- Virginie Lente as Lili
- Lisa Azuelos as The psychoanalyst

== Critical response ==
A cultural critic writing for The Independent noted that the film portrayed British culture in the way it is stereotypically imagined by many French, showing a small town outside London where it "never stops raining. The streets are populated by middle-aged women in dowdy floral dresses carrying garish umbrellas. For dinner, the French teenagers are served white bread, marmalade and pasta – on the same plate." In France the film was well received as depicting a generation of youngsters, much as other films in the 1980s and 1990s had.

== Remake ==
An American remake released on 4 May 2012 starring Miley Cyrus, Demi Moore, Ashley Greene, Adam Sevani, and Douglas Booth.
