= The Witnesses =

- Theatrical release poster
- Directed by: André Téchiné
- Written by: André Téchiné; Laurent Guyot; Vivianne Zingg
- Produced by: Saïd Ben Saïd
- Starring: Michel Blanc; Emmanuelle Béart; Sami Bouajila; Julie Depardieu; Johan Libéreau
- Cinematography: Julien Hirsch
- Edited by: Martine Giordano
- Music by: Philippe Sarde
- Distributed by: UGC Distribution
- Release dates: 7 March 2007 (France); 1 February 2008 (USA)
- Running time: 112 minutes
- Country: France
- Language: French
- Budget: $6.8 million
- Box office: $3 million

The Witnesses (French: Les Témoins) is a 2007 French drama film directed by André Téchiné, starring Michel Blanc, Sami Bouajila, Emmanuelle Béart and Johan Libéreau. The film, set in Paris in 1984, explores the lives of a closely knit group of friends who are impacted with the sudden outbreak of the AIDS epidemic. The Witnesses was critically acclaimed.

== Plot ==
It is the summer of 1984 in Paris. Sarah, a well-to-do writer of children's books, and her working-class husband, Mehdi, an inspector of North African descent, are confronting some marital problems after the recent arrival of their first child. Sarah, stumbling over a bout of writer's block, has little maternal instinct towards their newborn baby, whose cries she tunes out with earplugs while she works. Her husband despairs when she neglects the child, does what he can to fill in, and sometimes parks the child with his parents. The couple have an open marriage and both are allowed to take outside lovers in a “don’t ask, don’t tell” arrangement that seems to work, although not without tensions.

Meanwhile, Sarah's close friend Adrien, a middle-aged gay doctor, meets Manu, a carefree young man, at a cruising ground. Manu is not sexually attracted to Adrien and they do not have sex, but strike an emotional friendship. Manu is happy with the friendship and becomes Adrien's companion and his student of life's finer things. Wildly in love with his shallow, narcissistic protégé, Adrien is shrewd enough not to push too hard, but there is an element of masochism in his abject devotion.

Manu, who has recently arrived to Paris from a provincial town in the south of France, shares a space with his sister Julie, while she struggles to affirm herself as an opera singer. They live in a cheap hotel that is a center of sex work. This does not bother Manu, and he has a friendly relationship with Sandra, a sex worker. The hotel is under scrutiny by Mehdi, who leads the police force's vice division.

Through Adrien, Manu meets Sarah and Mehdi. The group of friends get together at Sarah's mother’s summer house in the Calanques of Marseille. One afternoon, when Mehdi and Manu go swimming in a remote cove, Mehdi saves Manu from drowning and, while tugging him to shore and administering mouth-to-mouth resuscitation, becomes aroused. Later, when Manu makes a pass at Mehdi, he responds, and they embark on a secret, no-strings-attached love affair. They meet at the holiday camping site outside Paris, where Manu now works as a cook.

When Manu confesses to Adrien that he has been having sex with Mehdi, Adrian is furious and hits Manu. After the fight, Adrian discovers spots on Manu's skin; it turns out that he has AIDS. Sarah tries to write a novel, and as a result Mehdi leaves temporarily to stay at his parents with the baby. Adrien becomes a leader in a medical crusade against AIDS, while meanwhile privately taking on Manu's treatment. Mehdi also does not shun his friend when he hears the news, although he is terrified that he has AIDS and cannot bring himself to tell his wife. He wants to see Manu, but Manu does not want to see him in the terrible state he is in. By contrast, Adrien is safe as his relationship with Manu was more companion-based than sexual.

Desperate to see his former lover, Mehdi forces his way into the camping site. Manu shows him his gun, with which he will commit suicide when his illness gets worse. Mehdi secretly takes it with him and throws it in the Seine. Mehdi is relieved that he has not been infected. Sarah has not been infected either and they reconcile. Manu's health deteriorates and he dies by suicide with pills supplied by Adrien for this purpose. Julie and Adrien take Manu's body to his grieving mother, to be buried in his native village.

Before he passes away, Manu uses a tape recorder to dictate his life for others to hear of. Sarah is inspired by the events as they have transpired so far and, once he is gone, listens to the tapes and begins writing a tale (for grown-ups) of it. She is free of her writer's block. Medhi is a bit concerned his life will become gossip, but Sarah assures him she has changed the names in the story. Julie decides to move to Munich, Mehdi and Adrien make amends while Sandra is HIV positive.

The following summer, Sarah, Mehdi, Adrien and his new companion Steve, a young American, return to the summerhouse on the Riviera to celebrate Sarah and Medhi's child's birthday.

== Cast ==
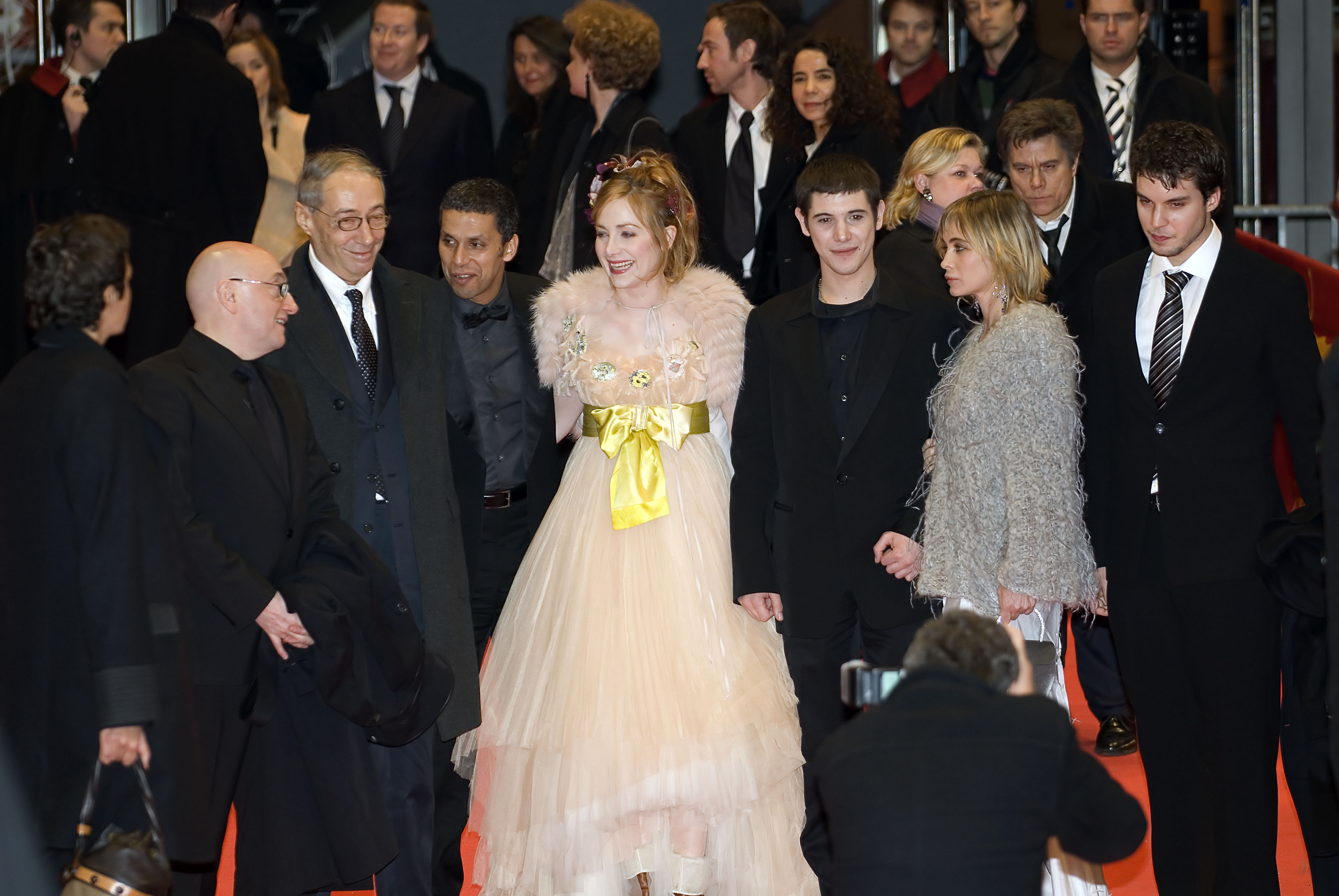
Michel Blanc, André Téchiné, Sami Bouajila, Julie Depardieu, Johan Libereau, Emmanuelle Béart, Lorenzo Balducci (left to right), arrival for the premiere of Les Témoins, Berlinale palace, Potsdamer Platz, Berlin.

- Johan Libéreau as Manu
- Michel Blanc as Adrien
- Sami Bouajila as Mehdi
- Emmanuelle Béart as Sarah
- Julie Depardieu as Julie
- Constance Dollé as Sandra
- Lorenzo Balducci as Steve
- Xavier Beauvois as the editor
- Jacques Nolot as the hotel's owner
- Maïa Simon as Sarah's mother
- Raphaeline Goupilleau as Manu and Julie's mother
- Michèle Moretti

== Analysis ==
Interviewed about The Witnesses André Téchiné commented: "I think it’s important to consider the issues in the film beyond the framework of heterosexuals vs homosexuals. I don’t know if Mehdi’s affair with Manu is his first or last gay experience; I don’t know if he’s been with other guys or might so in the future. I show my characters at a certain moment in their lives, which reveals certain aspects of them, but it is the tip of the iceberg. The rest, even if we get glimpses of it in the film, is left to the imagination of each person in the audience."

Commenting about the characters on The Witnesses, Téchiné said: "I prefer people to be moved by Manu when he runs, climbs a tree or burst out laughing than when he is sick. For me, that would be akin to taking the audience hostage and I reject that. But I don’t reject emotion itself -- rather I shift it around instead of placing it where it becomes predictable. I hope audiences find Manu moving in the upbeat scenes in the first half of the film: It is good time shared, not compassion in bad times, that makes good friends. As Sarah’s mother says in the film it’s a miracle being alive. And it is this sense of miracle that I wanted to conclude and open the film, broadening the horizon by revisiting spaces that Manu has inhabited and rediscovering them without him, with another character traveling through. Perhaps loving Manu and bearing witnesses to his life makes the other protagonist stronger".

== Music ==
The original score for the film was written by Alain Sarde, regular composer in Téchiné's films. The sound track includes an eclectic mix of artist and styles like:

- Marcia Baila Les Rita Mitsouko
- I'm a lover Andrea
- Don't Forget the Nite Les Rita Mitsouko
- Qual Favellar ? from Lorlando finto pazzo Act 3 Antonio Vivaldi
- Barbarina's Aria from Le nozze di Figaro Wolfgang Amadeus Mozart
- Restez avec Moi Les Rita Mitsouko
- Docteur Miracle Johan Libéreau

== Reception ==
The film was acclaimed by critics. Rotten Tomatoes reports that 88% of critics have given the film a positive review based on 48 reviews. The critical consensus is: "André Techiné successfully weaves five gripping stories in an engaging and realistic film about the early days of the AIDS epidemic." Metacritic, which assigns a weighted mean rating out of 100 to reviews from film critics, has a rating score of 75 based on 15 reviews.

Jan Stuart of Newsday wrote: "André Techiné's The Witnesses is one of the finest fiction-film accounts of a free yet frightful moment in time, when the relaxing sexual liberties of the previous decade were being squeezed by the onset of an unforgiving new virus." In Variety, Deborah Young commented: "What the characters in The Witnesses -- and the audience -- pay testimony to in André Téchiné's urgent, compassionate, and ultimately optimistic French drama are the toll the epidemic has rung, and the responsibility of the living to choose life". Nathan Lee in The Village Voice wrote: "Téchiné's triumph of compassion and craft shames the American cinema's indifference to gay history."

Film critic Roger Ebert commented: "The Witnesses doesn't pay off with a great operatic pinnacle, but it's better that way. Better to show people we care about facing facts they care desperately about, without the consolation of plot mechanics". Ken Fox in TV Guide wrote: " Techine’s unwillingness to soften his characters reflects a rare honesty particularly movies about fatal illness, and his film is an engaging and particularly French character study about human nature that’s rarely seen in the movies".

New York Press critic Armond White, who has been Téchiné's most fervent U.S. supporter, hailed The Witnesses: "No filmmaker has a greater appreciation of human diversity than Téchiné, whose socially complex melodramas always feature age, gender and race through liberté, égalité, fraternité. That's Téchiné's radical vision of France -- postmodern, post-Colonial and post-gay liberation with all those issues in motion."

In The New York Times, Stephen Holden warned viewers that: "The Witnesses may frustrate those who prefer movies that tell clear-cut stories in which hard lessons are learned. But in the director's farsighted vision of life, the ground under our feet is always shifting. As time pulls us forward, the shocks of the past are absorbed and the pain recedes. In its light-handed way, The Witnesses is profound." David Denby in his review for The New Yorker wrote: "Téchiné is unusually adroit at manipulating a complex set of relations within a very mixed group of people. This movie is easy to take -- chatty and sociable, with a brightly lit, even sunshiny gloss and an open sensuality".

== DVD release ==
The film was released on DVD in the United States on 24 June 2008.

== Accolades ==
- Berlin Film Festival (Germany)
  - Nominated: Golden Berlin Bear (André Téchiné)
- César Awards (France)
  - Won: Best Actor – Supporting Role (Sami Bouajila)
  - Nominated: Best Actor – Leading Role (Michel Blanc)
  - Nominated: Best Director (André Téchiné)
  - Nominated: Most Promising Actor (Johan Libéreau)
