= Déborah François =

Belgian actress

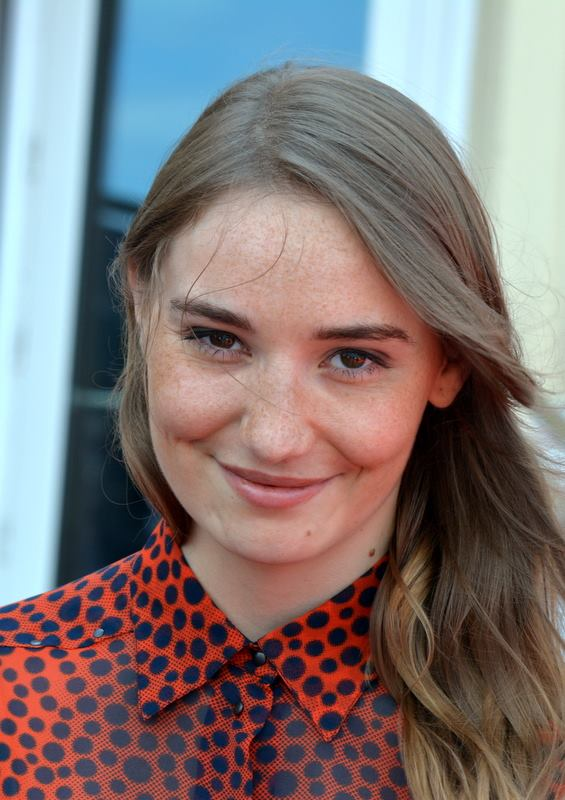
- Déborah François at the 2014 Cabourg Film Festival
- Born: 24 May 1987 (age 39); Rocourt, Liège, Belgium
- Occupation: Actress
- Years active: 2005–present
- Known for: L'Enfant; Populaire

Déborah François (French pronunciation: [debɔʁa fʁɑ̃swa]; born 24 May 1987) is a Belgian actress. She is best known for her starring role in the Palme d'Or-winning film, The Child (2005), directed by the Dardenne brothers. In 2009, she won a César Award for Most Promising Actress for The First Day of the Rest of Your Life.

== Early life ==
Déborah François was born in Rocourt, Liège, a provincial town of Belgium. She is the daughter of a policeman and a social worker, and the second of their three children.

== Career ==
François grew up in Liège, which is in the French-speaking area of Belgium, and in 2005 she was discovered by two film producers (Jean-Pierre and Luc Dardenne) who gave her the principal female part in their film entitled L'Enfant – The Child. The film takes place not far from François's home town in the run-down industrial town of Seraing, features a young couple, Bruno and Sonia. The couple live off social security benefits and the proceeds of Bruno's robberies – he is the head of a gang of thieves. When Sonia gives birth to a baby, Bruno sells their child to a dealer for a few thousand euros. This film was awarded the Palme d'Or at the 2005 Cannes Film Festival.

After her début as an actress she left school and plunged into her next film in Denis Dercourt's Thriller La Tourneuse de pages - The Page Turner in 2006 which brought her further acclaim. In the film she plays the cool and calculating butcher's daughter Mélanie, who takes her revenge on the middle classes. Years before, she thought that her promising career as a pianist had been ruined by the carelessness of a famous pianist and member of a jury (played by Catherine Frot), so she now takes her revenge. Through a stroke of luck she manages to insert herself into the family unnoticed as a baby sitter and page turner. In this film François mimes the part of Mélanie, which won her special acclaim from the critics and for which she was nominated for a César Award in 2007.

In 2009, François won a César Award for her role as Fleur in The First Day of the Rest of Your Life. In that same year, she was also awarded the Romy-Schneider Prize and starred in the film My Queen Karo opposite Matthias Schoenaerts. She then starred in the 2010 film Mes chères études, (later re-titled Student Services), about a university student who turns to prostitution to pay bills. In 2013, she was nominated for the Magritte Award for Best Actress for Les Tribulations d'une caissière. In 2014, she was nominated for Populaire and in 2015 she was nominated for Maestro.

== Personal life ==
François lives in Paris, France, after growing up in Liège, Belgium, where she attended the same high school as fellow actress Marie Gillain, who also features in Les Femmes de l'Ombre (as Suzy Desprez, while she assumes the role of Gaëlle Lemenech).

François said after the film L'Enfant: "My life changed completely. Before 'L'Enfant,' I thought, 'I'm this lucky girl who is going to make a movie, but that's going to be the only movie I'll ever make.' I had never even been to Paris before, and all of a sudden I'm around the world with festivals. It was very different from high school."

She was in a brief relationship with Mario Casas in 2020.

== Filmography ==
=== Film ===
Year	Title	Role(s)	Director(s)	Notes
1992	Malveillos, il est minuit Poupée	Vazimolette	Christian Pfohl & Kram Reyob	Short film
2005	The Child	Sonia	Dardenne Brothers	Joseph Plateau Award for Best Belgian Actress
2006	The Page Turner	Mélanie Prouvost	Denis Dercourt	
2007	Red Ants	Alex	Stéphan Carpiaux	
2007	Indian Summer	Suzanne	Alain Raoust	
2008	Female Agents	Gaëlle Lemenech	Jean-Paul Salomé	
2008	The First Day of the Rest of Your Life	Fleur Duval	Rémi Bezançon	César Award for Most Promising Actress
2009	Unmade Beds	Véra	Alexis Dos Santos	
2009	Please, Please Me!	Aneth	Emmanuel Mouret	
2009	My Queen Karo	Dalia	Dorothée Van Den Berghe	
2010	Student Services	Laura	Emmanuelle Bercot	
2011	The Monk	Valerio / Mathilde	Dominik Moll	
2011	Memories Corner	Ada Servier	Audrey Fouché	
2011	The Tribulations of a Cashier	Solweig Antoniazi	Pierre Rambaldi	
2012	Zarafa	Zarafa	Rémi Bezançon & Jean-Christophe Lie	English dub provided by Erica Schroeder
2012	Populaire	Rose Pamphyle	Régis Roinsard	
2013	Going Away	Emmanuelle Cambière	Nicole Garcia	
2014	Maestro	Gloria	Léa Fazer	
2016	The Poisoning Angel	Hélène Jégado	Stéphanie Pillonca-Kervern	
2016	Cézanne and I	Marie-Hortense Fiquet	Danièle Thompson	
2016	My Family Already Adores You!	Éva Périné	Jérôme Commandeur & Alan Corno	
2017	Everyone's Life	Jessica	Claude Lelouch	
2017	Praise Me!	Léa Masson	Coline Assous & Virginie Schwartz	
2018	Territory of Love	Maria	Romain Cogitore	
2019	Never Grow Old	Audrey Tate	Ivan Kavanagh	
2019	Savage State	Justine	David Perrault	
2020	The Paramedic	Vanesa François	Carles Torras	
TBA	The Long Teeth	Mathilde	Jérôme Genevray	In Production

== Awards and nominations ==
Year	Association	Category	Work	Result
2006	Joseph Plateau Awards	Joseph Plateau Award for Best Belgian Actress	L'Enfant – The Child	Won
2006	César Awards	César Award for Most Promising Actress	L'Enfant – The Child	Nominated
2007	César Awards	César Award for Most Promising Actress	The Page Turner	Nominated
2007	Lumiere Awards	Lumiere Award for Most Promising Young Actress	The Page Turner	Nominated
2007	SACD Awards	Suzanne Bianchetti Award	—N/a	Won
2009	Prix Romy Schneider	Prix Romy Schneider	—N/a	Won
2009	César Awards	César Award for Most Promising Actress	The First Day of the Rest of Your Life	Won
2013	Globes de Cristal Award	Globes de Cristal Award for Best Actress	Populaire	Nominated
2013	Magritte Awards	Magritte Award for Best Actress	Les Tribulations d'une caissière	Nominated
2014	Magritte Awards	Magritte Award for Best Actress	Populaire	Nominated
2015	Magritte Awards	Magritte Award for Best Actress	Maestro	Nominated
