= Anne Benoît =

French actress

- Occupation: Actress
- Years active: 1981–present

Anne Benoît is a French actress. She has appeared in more than 60 film and television productions since 1981.

== Career ==
Benoît was trained at the Conservatoire de Versailles, under the direction of Marcelle Tassencourt. She later attended the Tania Balachova theatre school, and enrolled in workshops conducted by Antoine Vitez, Sophie Loucachevsky and Aurélien Recoing. She made her film debut in the 1981 film Schools Falling Apart (Le Bahut va craquer) directed by Michel Nerval.

== Theater ==
Year	Title	Author	Director
1984	Life Is a Dream	Pedro Calderón de la Barca	Antonio Arena
1985–86	Lucrèce Borgia	Victor Hugo	Antoine Vitez
1987	The Satin Slipper	Paul Claudel	Antoine Vitez
1987	Les Désossés	Louis-Charles Sirjacq	Sophie Loucachevsky
1988	Exiles	James Joyce	Jacques Baillon
1988	La Force de tuer	Lars Norén	Jean-Louis Jacopin
1989	Des Françaises	Michèle Fabien	Laurence Février
1990	La Dame de chez Maxim	Georges Feydeau	Alain Françon
1991	Britannicus	Jean Racine	Alain Françon
1991	Indices terrestres	Marina Tsvetaeva	Éric Didry
1991	Phaedra	Marina Tsvetaeva	Sophie Loucachevsky
1992	Filles d'Ève	Laurence Février	Laurence Février
1993	La Remise	Roger Planchon	Alain Françon
1994–95	The War Plays	Edward Bond	Alain Françon
1996	L'Île des esclaves	Pierre de Marivaux	Laurence Février
1997	Joséphine, une petite révolte dans un placard à balais	Guy Walter	Jean Lacornerie
1998	Le Fond de la pensée c’est le chien	Unknown	Jean Lacornerie
1999	Eva Perón	Copi	Jean Lacornerie
1999	L'Oiseau de lune	Unknown	Antoine Bourseiller
2000	Cendres de cailloux	Daniel Danis	Dag Jeanneret
2000–01	Medea	Euripides	Jacques Lassalle
2002	La Demoiselle dite Chien Sale	Anne Benoît	Anne Benoît
2003	Baal	Bertolt Brecht	François Bourgeat
2003	Les Prétendants	Jean-Luc Lagarce	Jean-Pierre Vincent
2003	Le Collier d'Hélène	Carole Fréchette	Nabil El Azan
2004	A Moon for the Misbegotten	Eugene O'Neill	Robert Bouvier
2004	Just Hamlet	Serge Valletti	Cécile Backès
2004–05	Derniers remords avant l'oubli	Jean-Luc Lagarce	Jean-Pierre Vincent
2005	The Annunciation of Marie	Paul Claudel	Christian Schiaretti
2006	The Suicide	Nikolai Erdman	Jacques Nichet
2007	L'Hôtel du libre échange	Georges Feydeau	Alain Françon
2007	A Moon for the Misbegotten	Eugene O'Neill	Robert Bouvier
2008	Oresteia	Aeschylus	Olivier Py
2008	Shitz	Hanoch Levin	Cécile Backès
2009	The Night of the Iguana	Tennessee Williams	Georges Lavaudant
2009	La Fable du fils substitué	Luigi Pirandello	Nada Strancar
2010	Manhattan Medea	Dea Loher	Sophie Loucachevsky
2010–11	Du mariage au divorce, Feu la mère de Madame & Léonie est en avance	Georges Feydeau	Alain Françon
2012	Britannicus	Jean Racine	Jean-Louis Martinelli
2015	Les Glaciers grondants	David Lescot	David Lescot
2016	Du vent dans les branches de Sassafras	René de Obaldia	Bernard Murat
2016	Couple	Gilles Gaston-Dreyfus	Gilles Gaston-Dreyfus
2017	La Vraie vie	Fabrice Roger-Lacan	Bernard Murat
2018	Les Eaux et Forêts	Marguerite Duras	Michel Didym
2019	Veillée de famille	Gilles Gaston-Dreyfus	Gilles Gaston-Dreyfus
2020	Otages	Sebastian Rivas & Nina Bouraoui	Richard Brunel
2023	À la vie à la mort	Gilles Gaston-Dreyfus	Gilles Gaston-Dreyfus
2023	The Italian Straw Hat	Eugène Labiche & Marc-Michel	Alain Françon

== Filmography ==
Year	Title	Role	Director	Notes
2000	Sans sommeil	The woman	Olivier Volcovici	Short
2002	The Adversary		Nicole Garcia	
2004	La confiance règne	Gisèle	Étienne Chatiliez	
2004	Tout le plaisir est pour moi	The witness	Isabelle Broué	
2004	P.J.	Françoise	Gérard Vergez	TV series (1 episode)
2004	Avocats & associés	Chantal Lorient	Olivier Barma	TV series (1 episode)
2004	Juliette Lesage, médecine pour tous	Florence	Christian François	TV series (1 episode)
2005	Papa	Aunt Martine	Maurice Barthélemy	
2005	The Ring Finger	The score lady	Diane Bertrand	
2005	Not Here to Be Loved	Hélène	Stéphane Brizé	
2005	Sœur Thérèse.com	Catherine Bayard	Olivier Barma	TV series (1 episode)
2006	Lady Chatterley	The merchant	Pascale Ferran	
2007	Darling	Suzanne Nicolle	Christine Carrière	
2007	Childhoods	Aline Renoir	Ismaël Ferroukhi	
2008	Paris	Suzini	Cédric Klapisch	
2008	Stella	Madame Douchewsky	Sylvie Verheyde	
2008	Séraphine	Madame Delonge	Martin Provost	
2008	The Other One	Maryse Schneider	Patrick-Mario Bernard & Pierre Trividic	
2008	Chez Maupassant	Mother Vallin	Olivier Schatzky	TV series (1 episode)
2009	Les Petits Meurtres d'Agatha Christie	Madame Daste	Eric Woreth	TV series (1 episode)
2009	Kaamelott	Drusilla	Alexandre Astier	TV series (5 episodes)
2010	On Tour	The cashier	Mathieu Amalric	
2010	Small World	Nadia	Bruno Chiche	
2010	The Round Up	Matthey Jouanis	Roselyne Bosch	
2010	Imogène McCarthery	Janice Lewis	Alexandre Charlot & Franck Magnier	
2010	An Ordinary Execution	Alexandra	Marc Dugain	
2010	Pieds nus sur les limaces	Mireille	Fabienne Berthaud	
2010	Jours de colère	The restaurant owner	Charles Redon	Short
2010	Petites révoltes du milieu	The mother	François Brunet	Short
2010	Histoires de vies	Jeanne	Jean-Marc Rudnicki	TV series (1 episode)
2011	15 Lads	Véronique's mother	Romain Cogitore	
2011	Low Cost	Nadine	Maurice Barthélémy	
2011	Louise Wimmer	Nicole	Cyril Mennegun	
2011	My Little Princess	Madame Chenus	Eva Ionesco	
2011	Derrière les murs	Catherine Luciac	Julien Lacombe & Pascal Sid	
2011	The Woman in the Fifth	The teacher	Paweł Pawlikowski	
2011	Quand la guerre sera loin	Céline Midavaine	Olivier Schatzky	TV movie
2011	Hard	Madame Martel	Cathy Verney	TV series (1 episode)
2012	Pirate TV	Madame Serrano	Michel Leclerc	
2012	La fleur de l'âge	Madame Correau	Nick Quinn	
2012	Pauline détective	Maryvonne	Marc Fitoussi	
2012	Farewell, My Queen	Rose Bertin	Benoît Jacquot	
2012	Les Chiens Verts	Domi	Colas & Mathias Rifkiss	Short
2012	Le fil d'Ariane	Estelle	Marion Laine	TV movie
2012	Un crime oublié	Sophie	Patrick Volson	TV movie
2013	The Ultimate Accessory	The DDASS woman	Valérie Lemercier	
2013	216 mois	Maureen	Frederic & Valentin Potier	Short
2013	Just Before Losing Everything	Gaëlle	Xavier Legrand	Short
2013	Les Dames	Ludo	Philippe Venault	TV series (1 episode)
2014	Burnout	Madame Elise	Nathalie Lanier	Short
2014	Du grain à moudre	The mother	Sonia Larue	Short
2014	En avant, calme et droit	Romy's mother	Julie-Anne Roth	Short
2014	Méfions-nous des honnêtes gens!	The concierge	Gérard Jourd'hui	TV movie
2014	3xManon	Viviane Perrot	Jean-Xavier de Lestrade	TV mini-series
2014	Candice Renoir	Corinne Rizzi	Nicolas Picard	TV series (1 episode)
2014	Spiral	The Judge	Frédéric Jardin & Nicolas Guicheteau	TV series (3 episodes)
2015	Graziella	The helpful woman	Mehdi Charef	
2015	Parisiennes	Augustine	Slony Sow	
2015	I Am a Soldier	Martine	Laurent Larivière	
2015	Looking for Her	Annette Lefèvre	Ounie Lecomte	
2015	My Golden Days	Louise	Arnaud Desplechin	
2015	Hors cadre, une trilogie	Colline	Coco Tassel	Short
2015	Mystère à l'Opéra	Yvonne Jourdeuil	Léa Fazer	TV movie
2015	Les Petits Meurtres d'Agatha Christie	Annick Devassene	Marc Angelo	TV series (1 episode)
2015	Lazy Company	Sanders	Samuel Bodin	TV series (4 episodes)
2016	Lutine	Attorney	Isabelle Broué	
2016	Patients	Christiane	Mehdi Idir & Grand Corps Malade	
2016	La voix du père	Kathy	Colas & Mathias Rifkiss	Short
2016	Y a pas de lézard	Sylvie	Noël Fuzellier	Short
2016	Après moi le bonheur	Madame Lorcat	Nicolas Cuche	TV movie
2016	Mongeville	Hélène Vannier	Hervé Brami	TV series (1 episode)
2016	Duel au soleil	Isabelle Cazes	Didier Le Pêcheur	TV series (1 episode)
2016	Fais pas ci, fais pas ça	Andrée	Pierre Aknine	TV series (2 episodes)
2016	Spin	Hélène Sacco	Frédéric Garson	TV series (4 episodes)
2017	L'un dans l'autre	Françoise	Bruno Chiche	
2017	Witnesses	Christiane Varène	Hervé Hadmar	TV series (8 episodes)
2018	Claire Darling	Madame Hiram	Julie Bertuccelli	
2018	Gaston Lagaffe	The doctor	Pierre-François Martin-Laval	
2018	Belle and Sebastien: Friends for Life	Madeleine	Clovis Cornillac	
2018	Le pont du diable	Chantal Fazergues	Sylvie Ayme	TV movie
2018	Ma mère, le crabe et moi	Nadège	Yann Samuell	TV movie
2019	Selfie	Chantal	Marc Fitoussi	
2019	Qui m'aime me suive !	Rosine	José Alcala	
2019	Le tapis	Madeleine	Marie Dompnier	Short
2019	Boustifaille	Lisbeth	Pierre Mazingarbe	Short
2019	Un jour bien ordinaire		Ovidie & Corentin Coëplet	Short
2019	Access	Jacky	Varante Soudjian	TV series (3 episodes)
2020	Mon cousin	Doctor Vonnet	Jan Kounen	
2020	T'as pécho?	The teacher	Adeline Picault	
2020	C'est la vie	Mamoune	Julien Rambaldi	
2020	Tout nous sourit	Suzanne Pottier	Mélissa Drigeard	
2020	Le voyageur	Major Cathy Duchêne	Stéphanie Murat	TV series (1 episode)
2021	Les fantasmes	The service manager	David & Stéphane Foenkinos	
2021	C'est magnifique!	Héloïse Fontaine	Clovis Cornillac	
2021	S.O.S.	Maddy	Sarah Hafner	Short
2021	Bruits blancs	Agathe	Thomas Soulignac	Short
2021	Jugé sans justice	Attorney Synthès	Lou Jeunet	TV movie
2021	Lupin	Fabienne Beriot	Marcela Said	TV series (1 episode)
2021	Une affaire française	Monique Jacob	Christophe Lamotte	TV series (1 episode)
2021	Paris Police 1900	Madame Guérin	Julien Despaux, Frédéric Balekdjian, ...	TV series (6 episodes)
2022	En même temps	Molitor's mother	Benoît Delépine & Gustave Kervern	
2022	Choeur de rockers	Betty	Luc Bricault & Ida Techer	
2022	Des gens bien ordinaires	Josette Rigaud	Ovidie	TV series (2 episodes)
2022	Pandore	Yvonne Delval	Savina Dellicour & Vania Leturcq	TV series (6 episodes)
2022	Les Amateurs	Solange	Frédéric Scotlande	TV series (6 episodes)
2023	Hawaii	Colette	Mélissa Drigeard	
2023	All Your Faces	Yvette	Jeanne Herry	
2023	Consent	The teacher	Vanessa Filho	
2023	For Night Will Come	Hélène Noisy	Céline Rouzet	
2023	La fiancée du poète	Annie	Yolande Moreau	
2023	Notre tout petit petit mariage	Madame Lanoix	Frédéric Quiring	
2023	Au bord de nos nuits blanches	Lucette	Elsa Aloisio	Short
2023	Class Act	Sandrine Leduc	Tristan Séguéla	TV mini-series
