= Vincent Elbaz =

French film, television, and theater actor

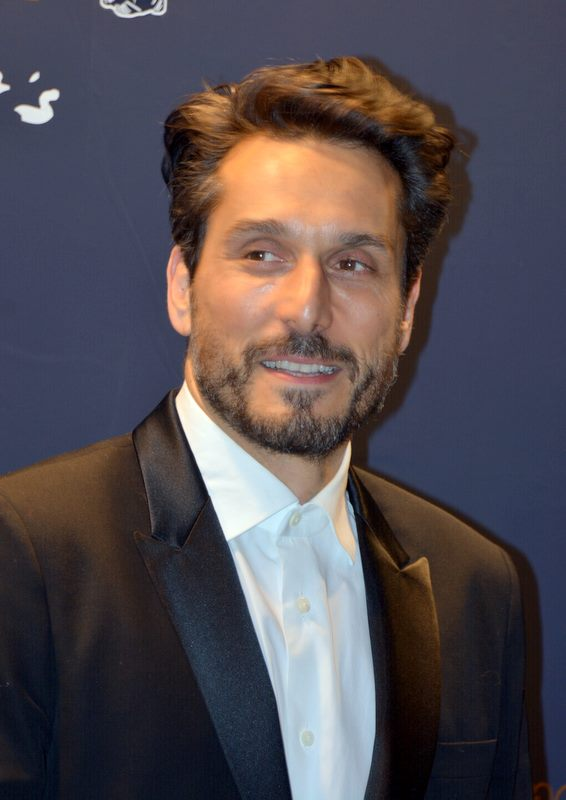
- Elbaz in 2017
- Born: 3 February 1971 (age 55); Paris
- Occupation: Actor
- Years active: 1994–present

Vincent Elbaz (born 3 February 1971) is a French actor. He has appeared in many French television shows and films.

His first major role was in the 1994 film Le péril jeune. Elbaz received the 1998 Jean Gabin Prize.

Elbaz was born in Paris to an Algerian Jewish family. He is married to Fanny Conquy, with whom he has two children.

== Filmography ==
- 1994 : Le Péril jeune, by Cédric Klapisch
- 1995 : Le Plus bel âge..., by Didier Haudepin
- 1996 : Enfants de salaud, by Tonie Marshall
- 1996 : Je m'appelle Régine, by Pierre Aknine (TV)
- 1997 : Just Do It, by Frédéric Chèze & Denis Thybaud (Short Film)
- 1997 : Les Randonneurs, by Philippe Harel
- 1997 : La Vérité si je mens !, by Thomas Gilou
- 1997 : Petits Désordres amoureux, by Olivier Péray
- 1998 : Grève party, by Fabien Onteniente
- 1999 : Suzy vend des sushis, by Delphine Quentin (Short Film)
- 1999 : Quasimodo d'El Paris, by Patrick Timsit
- 1999 : Le Sourire du clown, by Éric Besnard
- 1999 : Peut-être, by Cédric Klapisch
- 1999 : Un pur moment de rock'n roll, by Manuel Boursinhac
- 2000 : J'peux pas dormir..., bu Guillaume Canet (Short Film)
- 2000 : Nag la bombe, by Jean-Louis Milesi
- 2000 : Mémoire morte, by Jean-Jacques Dumonceau (Short Film)
- 2000 : La Parenthèse enchantée, by Michel Spinosa
- 2001 : Absolument fabuleux, by Gabriel Aghion
- 2002 : Rue des plaisirs, by Patrice Leconte
- 2002 : Embrassez qui vous voudrez, by Michel Blanc
- 2002 : Almost Peaceful, by Michel Deville
- 2003 : Not For, or Against (Quite the Contrary), by Cédric Klapisch
- 2005 : D'Artagnan et les trois mousquetaires, by Pierre Aknine
- 2005 : Test, by Didier Rouget (Short Film)
- 2005 : Dans tes rêves, by Denis Thybaud
- 2005 : Ma vie en l'air, by Rémi Bezançon
- 2005 : The Perfume of the Lady in Black, by Bruno Podalydès
- 2007 : Tel père telle fille by Olivier de Plas
- 2007 : Les Buttes Chaumont by Ariel Zeitoun
- 2007 : J'aurais voulu être un danseur by Alain Berliner
- 2007 : Le Dernier gang by Ariel Zeitoun
- 2008 : Les Randonneurs à Saint-Tropez by Philippe Harel
- 2009 : Good Canary by Patrick Czaplinski (TV)
- 2009 : Sweet Valentine by Emma Luchini
- 2009 : Park Benches by Bruno Podalydès
- 2009 : Tellement proches by Éric Toledano and Olivier Nakache
- 2010 : L'Assaut by Julien Leclercq
- 2010 : Au bas de l'échelle by Arnauld Mercadier (TV)
- 2010 : Comme les cinq doigts de la main by Alexandre Arcady
- 2012 : La vérité si je mens! 3 by Thomas Gilou
- 2014 : The Hundred-Foot Journey by Lasse Hallström
- 2016 : Amis publics by Edouard Pluvieux
- 2017 : Primaire by Hélène Angel
- 2017 : Il a déjà tes yeux by Lucien Jean-Baptiste
- 2017 : Tout là-haut by Serge Hazanavicius
- 2017 : The Trouble With You by Pierre Salvadori
- 2017 : Daddy Cool by Maxime Govare
- 2018 : I Am Not an Easy Man by Eleonore Pourriat
- 2018 : Le jeu by Fred Cavayé
- 2021 : Mystère by Denis Imbert
- 2023: The Book of Solutions by Michel Gondry

=== Television ===
Year	Title	Role	Notes
1995	A Case For A Woman	Ludo Beauchamp	1 episode: "Le secret de Marion"
1995	The Challengers	N/A	1 episode: "Yann"
2012–present	No Limit	Vincent Libérati	Lead role
2019–present	City on a Hill	Boston Cop Hugo Rhys	Lead role
2024	Spies of Terror (Les Espions de la terreur)	Major Vincent Morin	

== Theatre ==
- 2007 : Good Canary written by Zach Helm, directed by John Malkovich
- 2002 : Hysteria written by Terry Johnson, directed by John Malkovich, at Théâtre Marigny in Paris

Nomination Molières 2003 : Meilleur comédien et Révélation théâtrale masculine

- 1995 : COURTELINE + FEYDEAU = LA TÊTE À TOTO, directed by D. CHEKROUNE
- 1995 : Gueule de nuit, directed by P. Aknine
- 1994 TOURNÉE DE THÉÂTRE DE RUE (Compagnie Moctezuma Création Collective)
- 1993: Le Bouc written by Rainer Werner Fassbinder, directed by d'Antoine Scotto (Théâtre Mathis)
- 1992 : La plaisante aventure written by Carlo Goldoni, directed by Antoine Scotto, Festival de la Jeunesse
- 1990-1992: L'Ouest le vrai written by Sam Shepard, directed by J.-Y Hadjadj (Théâtre Ecole d'Anjou)
