= Love Is in the Air (2005 film) =

2005 film by Rémi Bezançon

- Film poster
- Directed by: Rémi Bezançon
- Written by: Rémi Bezançon
- Produced by: Eric Altmayer; Nicolas Altmayer; Isabelle Grellat
- Starring: Vincent Elbaz; Marion Cotillard; Gilles Lellouche
- Cinematography: Antoine Monod
- Edited by: Sophie Reine
- Music by: Sinclair
- Production companies: Mandarin Films; M6 Films
- Distributed by: TFM Distribution
- Release dates: 17 June 2005 (Cabourg Film Festival); 7 September 2005 (France)
- Running time: 103 minutes
- Country: France
- Language: French
- Budget: $5.8 million
- Box office: $2.5 million

Love Is in the Air (French: Ma vie en l'air) is a 2005 French comedy film directed by Rémi Bezançon.

== Synopsis ==
Yann is a boy full of contradictions. All his life is marked by airplanes. A brilliant engineer from the SUPAERO school, he works in aeronautics as an expert in aviation safety. But he developed, following the tragic death of his mother during his birth in flight, an insurmountable fear of flying. It is this phobia that made him lose his first great love, Charlotte, who went to study in the antipodes and which he never had the courage to join, as he had nevertheless promised her. Since then, he has made a series of conquests but all his stories end in disappointments because he lives in the secret hope of seeing Charlotte one day again. As he approaches his thirties, events rush and Yann loses control. Ludo, his childhood friend whom he was to host for one night, moved into his living room and in the apartment next door Alice, a surprising young woman, a romantic relationship advisor on a radio. Under the pretext of asking her for advice on her personal case, he spends a lot of time with her, which he appreciates. He finally seems ready to draw a line on the past. Until at the bend of a street, he finds the trace of Charlotte.

== Cast ==
- Vincent Elbaz as Yann Kerbec
- Marion Cotillard as Alice
- Gilles Lellouche as Ludo
- Elsa Kikoïne as Charlotte
- Didier Bezace as Castelot
- Cécile Cassel as Clémence
- Marie Rivière as Charlotte's mother
- Tom Novembre as Yann's father
- Philippe Nahon as Ludo's father
- François Levantal as The Sydney passenger

== Accolades ==
| Award / Film Festival | Category | Recipients and nominees | Result |
|---|---|---|---|
| César Awards | Most Promising Actor | Gilles Lellouche | Nominated |
| Globes de Cristal Award | Best Actress | Marion Cotillard | Nominated |
