= The Extraordinary Adventures of Adèle Blanc-Sec (film) =

2010 French fantasy film by Luc Besson

- Theatrical release poster
- Directed by: Luc Besson
- Screenplay by: Luc Besson
- Based on: "Adèle and the Beast" and "Mummies on Parade" by Jacques Tardi
- Produced by: Virginie Besson-Silla
- Starring: Louise Bourgoin; Mathieu Amalric; Philippe Nahon; Gilles Lellouche; Jean-Paul Rouve
- Narrated by: Bernard Lanneau
- Cinematography: Thierry Arbogast
- Edited by: Julien Rey
- Music by: Éric Serra
- Production companies: EuropaCorp; Apipoulaï Prod; TF1 Films Production
- Distributed by: EuropaCorp Distribution
- Release dates: 9 April 2010 (Brussels); 14 April 2010 (France); 13 August 2013 (United States (DVD))
- Running time: 107 minutes
- Country: France
- Language: French
- Budget: €31.9 million ($27–30 million)
- Box office: $34.1 million

The Extraordinary Adventures of Adèle Blanc-Sec (French: Les Aventures extraordinaires d'Adèle Blanc-Sec), released as Adèle: Rise of the Mummy in Malaysia and Singapore, is a 2010 French fantasy adventure film written, produced and directed by Luc Besson. It is loosely based on the comic book series The Extraordinary Adventures of Adèle Blanc-Sec by Jacques Tardi. Set in 1912 Paris, the film follows the eponymous journalist and adventurer, played by Louise Bourgoin, as she attempts to revive a mummified Egyptian physician to save her comatose sister, all while a pterosaur terrorizes the city. Mathieu Amalric, Gilles Lellouche, and Jean-Paul Rouve appear in supporting roles. The film blends elements of adventure, comedy, fantasy, and steampunk.

The film premiered at the Brussels International Fantastic Film Festival on 9 April 2010 and was released theatrically in France on 14 April 2010. It was a commercial success in France, and grossed $34.1 million worldwide. Critical reception was generally positive, with praise for Bourgoin's performance, the film's visual style, and its faithful yet dynamic adaptation of Tardi's whimsical tone. At the 36th César Awards, the film won Best Production Design for Hugues Tissandier.

== Plot ==
In Paris, c. 1912, the scientist Professor Marie-Joseph Espérandieu is experimenting with telepathic techniques and unintentionally hatches a 135-million-year-old pterosaur egg within the National Museum of Natural History. This results in the death of a former prefect, who was sharing a taxicab with a Moulin Rouge showgirl, witnessed only by a drunken passerby named Ferdinand Choupard. Panic spreads as sightings of the creature multiply, and the President of France orders the case to be handled by the highly decorated but bumbling Inspector Albert Caponi.

Meanwhile, Adèle Blanc-Sec, a famous journalist and travel writer, is in Egypt searching for the mummy of Patmosis, the physician to Pharaoh Ramesses II. She intends to revive him using Espérandieu's techniques so he can save her sister Agathe, who has been comatose for five years following a freak tennis accident involving a hatpin. After a brief struggle with her nemesis, the mysterious Professor Dieuleveult, she retrieves the mummy and returns home.

Her mission is complicated by Espérandieu being on death row, having been blamed for the pterosaur attacks after the creature was found in his apartment. Adèle, with the help of Andrej Zborowski, a young researcher at the Jardin des Plantes who is enamored with her, lures the pterosaur into hiding. She then rides the creature to rescue Espérandieu moments before his execution. However, celebrity big game hunter Justin de Saint-Hubert shoots the pterosaur, and the wound is simultaneously felt by Espérandieu due to their psychic link. The wound is fatal to the creature, but Espérandieu, with his dying breath, completes the resurrection ritual.

The mummy awakens but reveals himself to be Semothep, the Pharaoh's nuclear physicist, not a physician. Unable to help Agathe medically, he accompanies Adèle to the Louvre, where the rest of the Pharaoh's mummified court, including Ramesses II and his personal doctor Patmosis, are on display. Adèle convinces the Pharaoh to revive the court, and Patmosis uses advanced medical techniques to cure Agathe. The Pharaoh then decides to explore Paris with his entire court, wandering out into the night and terrifying the hapless Choupard once again.

Adèle decides she needs a vacation. As she boards a ship to relax, its name is revealed: the RMS Titanic. Dieuleveult is shown observing her from a distance, sarcastically wishing her a "good journey." In a mid-credits scene, Ménard, a botanist, pursues Saint-Hubert with a rifle, outraged that he shot the pterosaur. Ménard is arrested by Caponi as two gorillas stare menacingly at Saint-Hubert.

== Cast ==
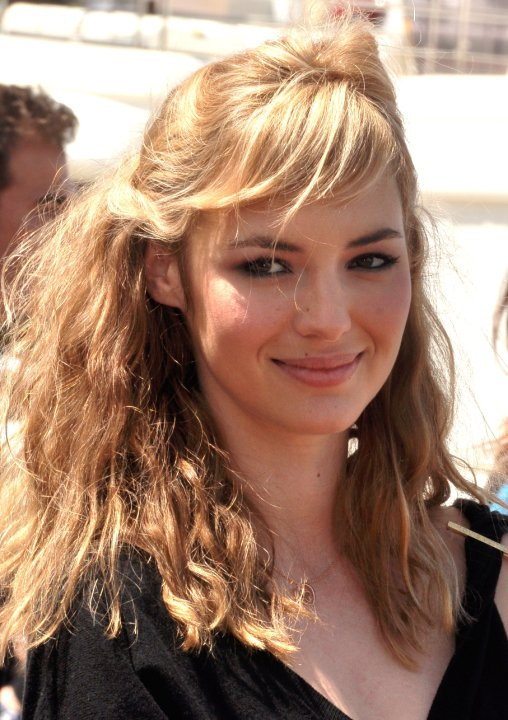
Louise Bourgoin at the 2010 Cannes Film Festival.

- Louise Bourgoin as Adèle Blanc-Sec, a bold journalist and adventurer
- Mathieu Amalric as Dieuleveult, Adèle's enigmatic nemesis and a deranged scientist
- Philippe Nahon as Professor Ménard, a scientist at the Jardin des Plantes
- Gilles Lellouche as Inspector Albert Caponi, a bumbling police inspector
- Jean-Paul Rouve as Justin de Saint-Hubert, a pompous big game hunter
- Jacky Nercessian as Professor Marie-Joseph Espérandieu, a scientist capable of reviving the dead
- Nicolas Giraud as Andrej Zborowski, a young researcher in love with Adèle
- Laure de Clermont-Tonnerre as Agathe Blanc-Sec, Adèle's comatose twin sister
- Gérard Chaillou as President Armand Fallières
- Serge Bagdassarian as Ferdinand Choupard, a perpetually unlucky drunkard
- Frédérique Bel as a bourgeois spectator at Espérandieu's execution
- Claire Pérot as Nini les Gambettes, the Moulin Rouge dancer
- François Chattot as Pointrenaud, the Prefect of Police
- Youssef Hajdi as Aziz, Adèle's guide in Egypt
- Swann Arlaud as the crier at the Élysée Palace
- Bernard Lanneau as the narrator (voice)
- Jacques Tardi as a ticket puncher (uncredited cameo)

== Production ==
=== Development ===
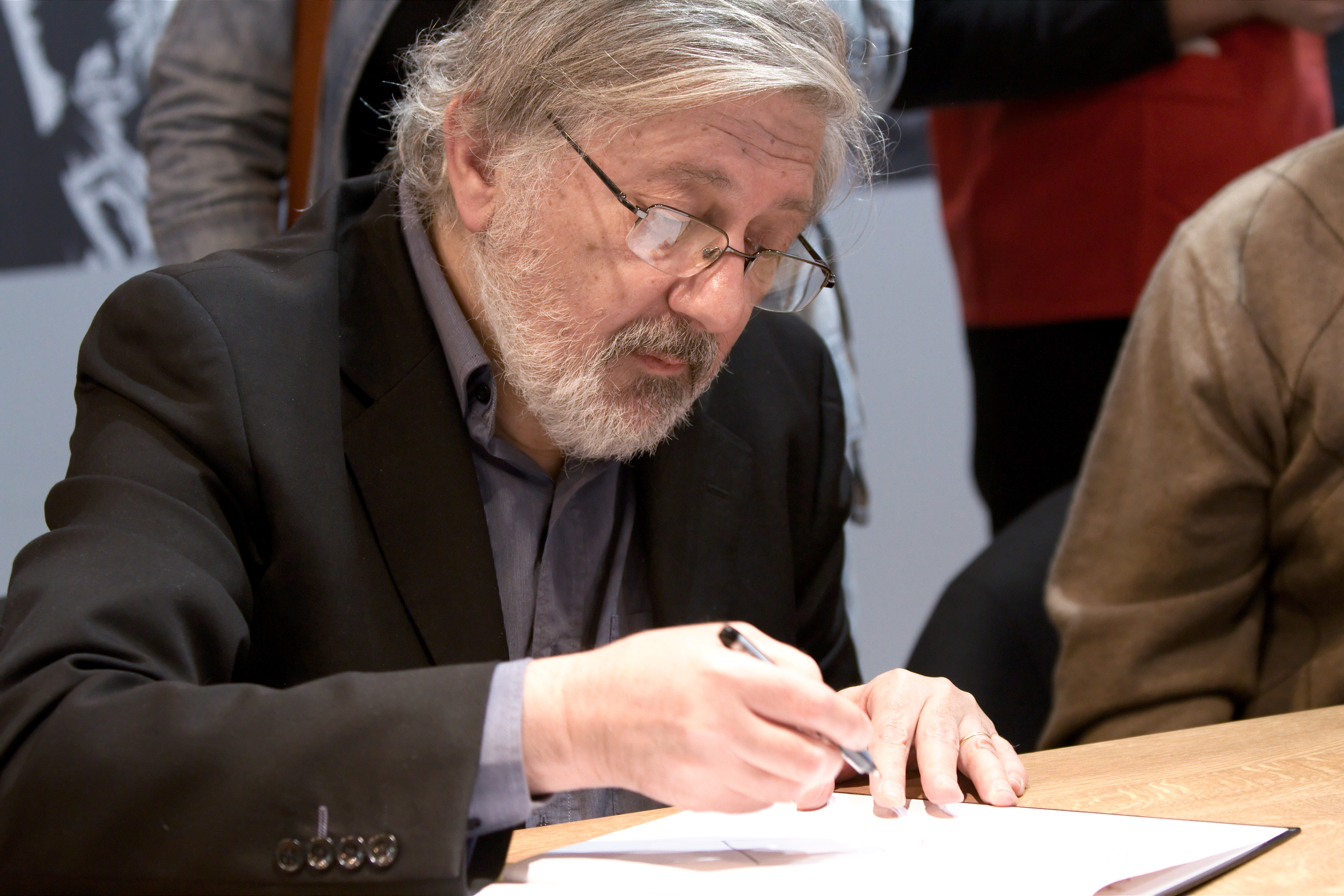
Jacques Tardi at the 2010 Paris Book Fair.

The film is an adaptation of Jacques Tardi's acclaimed comic series The Extraordinary Adventures of Adèle Blanc-Sec, which debuted in 1976. Luc Besson first approached Tardi in the early 2000s to acquire the adaptation rights. After years of negotiation, as Tardi had previously resisted offers due to concerns about creative control, Besson's EuropaCorp successfully secured the rights in January 2008. Tardi, though acknowledging the inherent "betrayal" of adaptation, endorsed Besson's script and made a cameo appearance in the film as a ticket puncher.

=== Casting ===
Louise Bourgoin was cast by Besson as Adèle after he saw her performance in La Fille de Monaco (2008); he was particularly drawn to her ability to portray a wide range of characters. For the villainous Dieuleveult, Besson cast Mathieu Amalric, an actor he greatly admired for his transformative abilities. Gilles Lellouche was cast as Inspector Caponi, a role for which he wore padded costumes to appear heavier.

=== Filming ===
The film was shot in the Super 35 format by frequent Besson collaborator Thierry Arbogast. Besson opted to film on location in Paris rather than relying heavily on green screen to authentically capture the city's early 20th-century atmosphere. Filming locations included the Louvre Palace, Place de la Concorde, National Museum of Natural History, Paris Zoological Park in Vincennes, Palais-Royal, and the Eiffel Tower. Additional scenes were shot in Mortagne-au-Perche, Normandy and in Cairo. The production was one of the most expensive French films of the year, with a budget of €31.9 million.

=== Music ===
The film's score was composed by Éric Serra, a longtime collaborator of Besson. The soundtrack album, featuring 49 tracks, was released by Columbia Records on 12 April 2010. The film's end credits feature the song "L'Adèle" performed by Catherine Ringer and the duet "Adèle Blanc-Sec" by Louise Bourgoin and Thomas Dutronc.

== Release ==
The Extraordinary Adventures of Adèle Blanc-Sec premiered at the Brussels International Fantastic Film Festival on 9 April 2010. It was released theatrically in France, Belgium, and Switzerland on 14 April 2010 by EuropaCorp Distribution. The film was later released in Italy on 15 October 2010 as Adèle e l'enigma del faraone, and in Germany on 30 September 2010 as Adèle und das Geheimnis des Pharaos. It did not receive a wide theatrical release in the United States but was released directly to DVD and Blu-ray by Shout! Factory on 13 August 2013 in both a cinematic version and a Director's Cut.

== Reception ==
=== Box office ===
The film opened at number one at the French box office, grossing approximately €3.7 million in its first week from 642,629 admissions across 636 screens. It went on to sell a total of 1,602,720 tickets in France, becoming one of the highest-grossing French films of the year in its home market. Internationally, the film grossed $20.7 million, bringing its worldwide total to $34.1 million against a production budget of €31.9 million. The film was a notable success in China, earning €5.5 million within its first two weeks of release.

=== Critical response ===
On Rotten Tomatoes, the film holds an approval rating of 88% based on 29 reviews, with an average rating of 6.1/10. The site's critical consensus reads, "The Extraordinary Adventures of Adèle Blanc-Sec is an old-school adventure yarn with a distaff European - and generally rather delightful - spin." On AlloCiné, a French cinema website, the film has an average critic rating of 2.8 out of 5, based on 25 reviews.

Variety magazine noted the film's "handsome production values, polished visual effects and eye-popping locations", and praised the performance of Louise Bourgoin as the titular heroine, while noting the "convoluted plot and boilerplate villains". Empire magazine gave the film 4 stars, "with enough thrills, giggles and pretty pictures to reward adventure-lovers". The Guardian gave it 3 out of 5 stars, describing it as a "ripping yarn", but also a collection of "ravishing, consequence-free setpieces". French press reaction was more mixed; Les Inrockuptibles praised its lightness and charm, while Le Monde and Télérama criticized the weakness of the dialogue.

== Accolades ==
Awards
Award	Category	Recipients and nominees	Result
36th César Awards	Best Production Design	Hugues Tissandier	Won
36th César Awards	Best Costume Design	Olivier Bériot	Nominated
Fantasporto 2011	Audience Award for Best Feature Film	Luc Besson	Won

== Potential sequel ==
Luc Besson initially announced plans for a trilogy of Adèle Blanc-Sec films, but a sequel did not materialize in the years following the release. In 2018, it was reported that Besson was developing a follow-up as a television series, though no further updates have been announced.

== See also ==
- April and the Extraordinary World, a 2015 animated film, also based on the visual style of Tardi
- List of films based on French-language comics
