= Pio Marmaï =

French actor (born 1984)

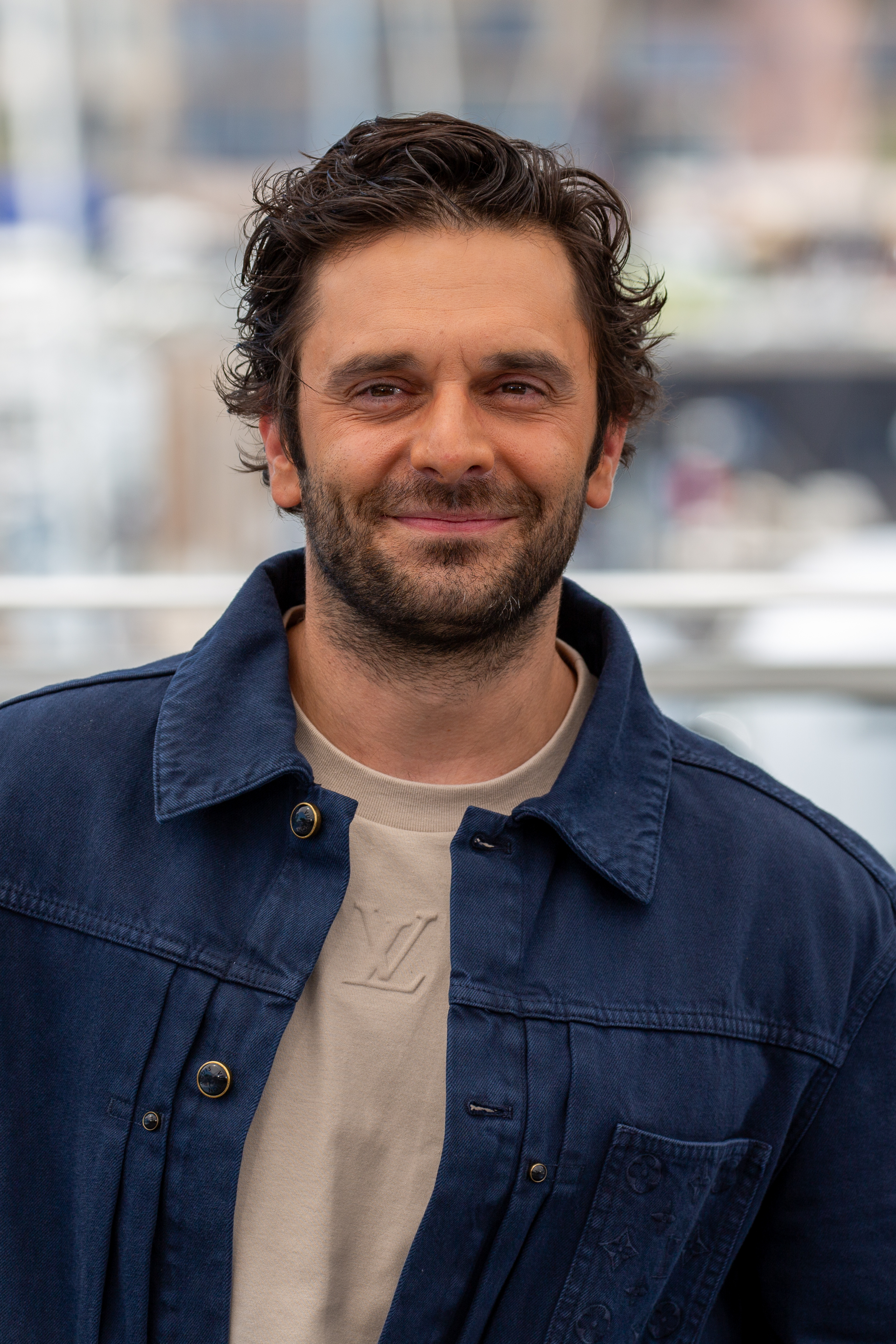
- Marmaï at the 2025 Cannes Film Festival
- Born: 13 July 1984 (age 42); Strasbourg, France
- Occupation: Actor
- Years active: 2006–present

Pio Marmaï (born 13 July 1984) is a French actor. He has appeared in more than twenty films since 2008. In 2025 he played the lead in the Netflix series Néro the Assassin.

== Early life and education ==
Marmaï was born on 13 July 1984. His mother is a former costume designer at the Opéra de Strasbourg, and his father a set designer. Marmaï studied at the Scuola Commedia dell'Arte and Créteil Conservatoire near Paris, and drama school at Saint-Étienne.

== Filmography ==
Year	Title	Role	Director	Notes
2008	Didine	Jérémie	Vincent Dietschy	
2008	Rien dans les poches	Marcel	Marion Vernoux	TV movie
2008	The First Day of the Rest of Your Life	Albert Duval	Rémi Bezançon	Nominated - César Award for Most Promising Actor
2009	Bazar	Fred	Patricia Plattner	
2009	La loi de Murphy	Elias	Christophe Campos	
2010	In Your Hands	Yann	Lola Doillon	
2010	Le pas Petit Poucet	Jean Bedave	Christophe Campos	TV movie
2010	Mon père, Francis le Belge	Francis Vanverberghe	Frédéric Balekdjian	TV movie
2010	Living on Love Alone	Ben	Isabelle Czajka	Nominated - César Award for Most Promising Actor
2011	A Happy Event	Nicolas Malle	Rémi Bezançon	
2011	Delicacy	François	David & Stéphane Foenkinos	
2012	Alyah	Alex Raphaelson	Elie Wajeman	
2012	Zombie chéri		Jérôme Genevray	Short
2012	Je suis une ville endormie	Théodore	Sébastien Betbeder	TV movie
2012	La collection donne de la voi(e)x		Jérôme Genevray	TV series (1 episode)
2013	Grand départ	Romain	Nicolas Mercier	
2014	In the Courtyard	Stéphane	Pierre Salvadori	
2014	Paris Follies	Stan	Marc Fitoussi	
2014	Maestro	Henri Renaud	Léa Fazer	
2014	Des lendemains qui chantent	Léon Kandel	Nicolas Castro	
2015	Toute première fois	Jérémy Deprez	Maxime Govare & Noémie Saglio	
2015	Our Futures	Thomas	Rémi Bezançon	
2016	Vendeur	Gérald	Sylvain Desclous	
2017	Back to Burgundy	Jean	Cédric Klapisch	
2017	K.O.	Boris	Fabrice Gobert	
2017	Santa & Cie		Alain Chabat	
2018	The Trouble With You	Antoine	Pierre Salvadori	Nominated - César Award for Best Actor
2020	How I Became A Superhero	Gary Moreau	Douglas Attal	
2020	The Night Doctor	Dimitri Kourtchine	Elie Wajeman	
2021	The Divide	Yann Caron	Catherine Corsini	
2021	Happening	Professeur Bornec	Audrey Diwan	
2022	Rise	Loïc	Cédric Klapisch	Nominated - César Award for Best Supporting Actor
2023	The Three Musketeers: D'Artagnan	Porthos	Martin Bourboulon	
2023	A Difficult Year	Albert	Éric Toledano and Olivier Nakache	
2023	Yannick	Paul Rivière	Quentin Dupieux	
2023	Daaaaaalí!	Salvador Dalí	Quentin Dupieux	
2023	The Three Musketeers: Milady	Porthos	Martin Bourboulon	
2024	The Ties That Bind Us	Alex Perthuis		
2025	Néro the Assassin	Néro Miséricorde	Allan Mauduit and Ludovic Colbeau-Justin	Netflix TV series
2026	The Electric Kiss	Antoine Balestro	Pierre Salvadori	

== Theatre ==
Year	Title	Author	Director	Notes
2006-07	Les Temps difficiles	Édouard Bourdet	Jean-Claude Berutti	Comédie-Française
2007	Andrea del Sarto	Alfred de Musset	Nathalie Mauger	
2015-16	Roberto Zucco	Bernard-Marie Koltès	Richard Brunel	
