= A Happy Event =

- Film poster
- French: Un heureux événement
- Directed by: Rémi Bezançon
- Screenplay by: Rémi Bezançon; Vanessa Portal
- Based on: Un heureux événement by Eliette Abécassis
- Produced by: Éric Altmayer; Nicolas Altmayer; Isabelle Grellat
- Starring: Louise Bourgoin; Pio Marmaï
- Cinematography: Antoine Monod
- Edited by: Sophie Reine
- Music by: Sinclair
- Production companies: Mandarin Cinéma; Gaumont; France 2 Cinéma; Scope Pictures; RTBF
- Distributed by: Gaumont (France); Cinéart (Belgium)
- Release dates: 28 September 2011 (France & Belgium)
- Running time: 109 minutes
- Countries: France; Belgium
- Language: French
- Budget: $13.6 million
- Box office: $3.9 million

A Happy Event (French: Un heureux événement) is a 2011 French-Belgian comedy-drama film directed by Rémi Bezançon.

== Plot ==
Barbara and Nicolas spin the perfect love. But there is one thing missing to their happiness: a child. One day, Barbara becomes pregnant. The birth of a baby girl will trouble her relationship with Nicolas and his family.

== Cast ==
- Louise Bourgoin - Barbara
- Pio Marmaï - Nicolas
- Josiane Balasko - Claire
- Thierry Frémont - Tony
- Gabrielle Lazure - Édith
- Firmine Richard - Midwife
- Lannick Gautry - Doctor Camille Rose
- Daphné Bürki - Katia
- Louis-Do de Lencquesaing - Jean-François Truffard
- Myriem Akheddiou - Nurse
