= Alexandre Charlet =

French actor

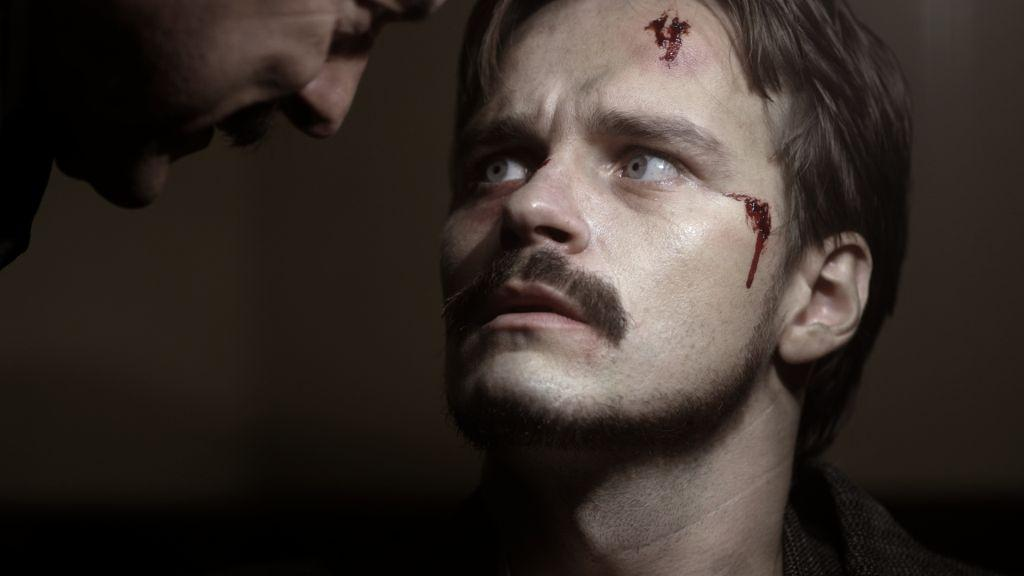
- Alexandre Charlet as Raoul Villain in Qui a tué Jaurès ? (2014)
- Born: Chambéry, France
- Occupation: Actor
- Website: www.alexandre-charlet.com

Alexandre Charlet is a French actor.

== Filmography ==
Year	Title	Role	Director	Notes
2020	Une si longue nuit	Ange	Jérémy Minui	TV series
2020	Un si grand soleil	Cyril Fiacre	Benoît D'Aubert, Amir Shadzi	TV series
2019	The Man Who Sold His Skin	Journalist	Kaouther Ben Hania	Movie
2019	Tomorrow Is Ours	Le Maton	Sebastien Perroy, Thierry Peythieu, Jérôme Navarro, Christophe Barraud	TV series
2019	Petits Secrets En Famille	Olivier	Jean-Luc Mathieu	TV series
2019	Plus belle la vie	Directeur d'hôtel	Pascal Roy	TV series
2015	Nilalang	Jean-Luc Lamy (French Interpol Agent)	Pedring Lopez	Movie
2014	Qui a tué Jaurès ?	Raoul Villain	Philippe Tourancheau	TV movie
2013	Going Away	Le deuxième 'voyou'	Nicole Garcia	Movie
2013	A Woman Named Mary	Peuple, Troubadour et Serviteur de Pilate	Robert Hossein	TV movie
2012	The Returned	Revenant Forêt	Fabrice Gobert	TV series
2012	Lignes de vie	François Jeanson	Adeline Darraux	TV series
2011	Dominic: Light of the Church	Peter Seila	Marcelino Saria	Movie

== Plays ==
- 2021 : Et les oiseaux répandirent la couleur (Solo)
- 2015 : L’Opéra de quat’sous by Bertolt Brecht & Kurt Weill – Directed by Olivier Desbordes & Eric Perez
- 2015 : Mon premier job (Solo) adapted from David Lodge's short story – Created under the watchful eyes of Gilbert Rouvière
- 2015 : Mon Prof est un Troll by Dennis Kelly – Directed by Anaïs Coq
- 2013 : Habillage ou la grisette nue by Sarah Fourage – Directed by Anna Delbos-Zamore
- 2012 : Lost in the Stars (Musical) Music by Kurt Weill and book by Maxwell Anderson, based on the novel Cry, the Beloved Country by Alan Paton – Directed by Olivier Desbordes
- 2011 : Qui a peur de Virginia Woolf by Edward Albee – Directed by Jean-Louis Sol
- 2011 : Paysage Moral (Solo) Mash-up of texts by Carlos Drumond de Andrade – Directed by Ferdinand Fortes
- 2010 : Amphitryon(s) by Plaute, Kleist and others – Directed by Hervé Dartiguelongue
- 2010 : Cairn by Enzo Cormann – Directed by Hélène Soulié
- 2008 : Baal [1919] by Bertolt Brecht – Directed by Mathias Beyler
- 2008 : La Nuit des Camisards by Lionnel Astier – Directed by Gilbert Rouvière
- 2008 : Scènes de chasse en Bavière by Martin Sperr – Directed by Yves Ferry
- 2007 : En Attendant que la neige tombe (Work in progress) – Directed by Jean-Baptiste Demarigny
- 2006 : Ali Cogia, Marchant de Bagdad (Tales of the Arabian Nights) – Collective creation, Compagnie Biladi
- 2006 : Poeub by Serge Valetti – Directed by Michel Didym
- 2005 : Les Hommes de Terre by Marion Aubert – Directed by Richard Mitou
