= Drops of God (TV series) =

2023 TV series

- Promotional poster
- Genre: Drama
- Created by: Quoc Dang Tran
- Based on: Drops of God by: Tadashi Agi; Shu Okimoto
- Directed by: Oded Ruskin
- Starring: Fleur Geffrier; Tomohisa Yamashita
- Composer: Kenma Shindo
- Countries of origin: France; United States; Japan
- Original languages: French; English; Japanese
- No. of seasons: 2
- No. of episodes: 16

Production
- Executive producers: Jean Luc Berlot; Léonard Glowinski; Sam Kozhaya; Daniel March; Kazufumi Nagasawa; Tetsuya Ono; Oded Ruskin; Kyoko Sekine; Anne Thomopoulos
- Producer: Klaus Zimmermann
- Cinematography: Rotem Yaron
- Editors: Boaz Mann; Omri Zalmona
- Running time: 36–58 minutes
- Production companies: Legendary Television; Les Productions Dynamic; France Televisions; Hulu Japan; Adline Entertainment; 22H22

Original release
- Network: Apple TV+
- Release: April 21 – June 2, 2023
- Network: Hulu (Japan)
- Release: September 15, 2023 – present
- Network: France 2 (France)
- Release: March 27, 2024 – present
- Network: Apple TV
- Release: January 21, 2026 – present

Drops of God (French: Les Gouttes de Dieu; Japanese: 神の雫, romanized: Kami no Shizuku) is a French-American-Japanese drama television series created by Quoc Dang Tran, directed by Oded Ruskin and starring Fleur Geffrier and Tomohisa Yamashita. It is based on the manga series of the same name written by Tadashi Agi and illustrated by Shu Okimoto. The series centres on the competition for inheritance of an estate and its vast wine collection between an heiress and a star student of a well-known oenologist who died. However, the former experiences severe side effects related to her childhood trauma and the latter's family complicates the process.

Drops of God premiered on 21 April 2023 on Apple TV+. In 2024, the series won the International Emmy Awards for Best Drama Series. In May 2024, the series was renewed for a second season, which premiered on January 21, 2026.

== Synopsis ==
When wine authority Alexandre Léger dies, he leaves behind the world's finest private wine collection, and a sprawling Tokyo estate. Before his estranged daughter Camille can claim her inheritance, she must battle Alexandre's protégé, Issei, in a series of wine-related tests.

In Season 2, set three years after Season 1, Camille and Issei set on journey to uncover the origin of the world's greatest wine, a mystery so elusive that even the legendary Alexandre Léger could not solve it. As they travel the world, the duo learn centuries of forgotten histories, hidden rivalries and secrets, which also test their sibling bond and themselves to solve the mystery.

== Cast ==
- Fleur Geffrier as Camille Léger
  - Manon Maindivide as Young Camille
- Tomohisa Yamashita as Issei Tomine
- Tom Wozniczka as Thomas Chassangre
- Stanley Weber as Alexandre Léger
- Luca Terracciano as Lorenzo
- Diego Ribon as Luca Inglese
- Azusa Okamoto as Yurika Katase
- Gustave Kervern as Philippe Chassangre
- Cécile Bois as Marianne Léger
  - Margaux Châtelier as Young Marianne
- Makiko Watanabe as Honoka Tomine
  - Nanami Kameda as Young Honoka
- Satoshi Nikaido as Hirokazu Tomine
  - Kotaru Uchiyama as Young Hirokazu
- Antoine Chappey as Talion
- Masane Tsukayama as Noboru Tomine
- Lidia Vitale as Elisabetta Fossati
- Kyoko Takenaka as Miyabi

== Episodes ==
| Season | Episodes | Originally released | |
| Season | Episodes | First released | Last released |
|---|---|---|---|
| 1 | 8 | April 21, 2023 | June 2, 2023 |
| 2 | 8 | January 21, 2026 | March 11, 2026 |

=== Season 1 (2023) ===
| No. overall | No. in season | Title | Directed by | Written by | Original release date |
|---|---|---|---|---|---|
| 1 | 1 | "A Father" | Oded Ruskin | Quoc Dang Tran | April 21, 2023 |
Camille Léger, a 29-year-old writer living with her mother in Paris, receives an urgent call from her estranged father Alexandre in Tokyo—he's dying and wants to see her. Despite her mother Marianne's warnings that he's manipulative, Camille boards a private jet, but arrives too late; Alexandre has died. At the will reading, she meets Issei Tomine, Alexandre's star student whom he called his "spiritual son." The lawyer reveals Alexandre's unusual inheritance plan: his $150 million wine collection—the world's greatest—will go to whoever wins a three-round blind tasting competition between Camille and Issei. The catch: Camille doesn't drink alcohol at all due to a traumatic past. Humiliated when forced to taste wine publicly, she collapses and rages at Luca, Alexandre's friend who knew about the test. After a Buddhist cremation ceremony where Camille must handle her father's bones, Luca shows her Alexandre's legendary cellar, filled with bottles labeled with personal notes—including wines saved for moments with her. She watches a video message from Alexandre acknowledging he was a "shitty father" but asking her to compete, hoping the tests will help them reconnect. He's arranged for his friend Philippe to train her. Moved, Camille decides to stay.
| 2 | 2 | "Sky, Earth, Humans" | Oded Ruskin | Quoc Dang Tran | April 21, 2023 |
Camille arrives at Philippe Chassangre's vineyard in southern France to begin her wine training with his son Thomas. An MRI reveals Camille has an exceptional sensory memory but also a trauma response—her brain associates taste and alcohol with fear and disgust, stemming from childhood. The doctor recommends she stop training, but Camille refuses. She discovers her mother Marianne sent a fake email to Alexandre years ago, pretending to be Camille and cutting off all contact—explaining why her father never reached out. Devastated but determined, Camille devises "Plan B": since she can't taste wine without getting sick, she'll train her nose instead using aroma samples. Thomas guides her through 54 wine aromas and hundreds of wine samples brought by his girlfriend Juliette. Philippe takes Camille into the vineyards to connect wine to nature—soil, rocks, sun—helping her see past the alcohol. A breakthrough comes when she smells fern in a wine and recognizes it from the Tokyo test. In a dramatic final scene, Camille tastes wine and has a vision—chalky, cold Burgundy—nearly identifying it perfectly. She then remembers it wasn't Alexandre who made her sick as a child; she voluntarily drank the wine herself. The trauma was self-inflicted, not her father's fault.
| 3 | 3 | "Duel" | Oded Ruskin | Quoc Dang Tran, Clémence Madeleine-Perdrillat & Alice Vial | April 28, 2023 |
Camille and Thomas travel to meet André Gigon, a winemaker who created a rare grape variety called Lignage that Camille suspects matches the mystery wine. They learn the estate went bankrupt and no bottles remain. Camille flies to Tokyo, where Luca arranges for her to smell a Lignage bottle during a wealthy client's dinner, but she realizes it's not a match. Thomas surprises her by flying to Japan to help. While taking a break, Thomas spots a rusty bike and has a breakthrough—the aroma she thought was celery root is actually truffle, indicating an aged Cabernet. They narrow it down to either Vega Sicilia or Chateau Cheval Blanc based on barrel aging differences. Meanwhile, Issei's mother pressures his father Hirokazu to convince Issei to quit, but Issei refuses, declaring wine is his life. At the blind tasting, both Camille and Issei correctly identify Chateau Cheval Blanc, but Issei wins by nailing the 1999 vintage while Camille guesses 2000.
| 4 | 4 | "Foundation" | Oded Ruskin | Quoc Dang Tran, Clémence Madeleine-Perdrillat & Alice Vial | May 5, 2023 |
In a flashback-heavy episode, we learn how Alexandre Léger came to Japan. After failing his thesis defense due to his outspoken criticism of prestigious Bordeaux estates, Alexandre and Marianne moved to Tokyo where he took a teaching position. There, he met a young Honoka Tomine, who impressed him with her exceptional palate during informal wine tastings at a local bar. The course was shut down after Hirokazu got drunk on campus, but Honoka continued visiting Alexandre. Meanwhile, Marianne landed a job at the French Embassy and convinced publisher Jacques Fusier to take on Alexandre's wine guide. During a trip to Thailand, Marianne reveals she's pregnant. The episode ends with a devastating parallel: Honoka tells Hirokazu she's also pregnant. In the present day, Issei discovers an old photo of his mother with Alexandre and confronts Honoka, who dismisses it as a casual university class she barely remembers.
| 5 | 5 | "The Link" | Oded Ruskin | Quoc Dang Tran, Clémence Madeleine-Perdrillat & Alice Vial | May 12, 2023 |
The second test is revealed: identify a wine linked to an Italian Baroque painting by Fede Galizia. Camille's team focuses on Italian wines from Lombardy with peach, jasmine, and quince aromas. Meanwhile, Issei's father Hirokazu has disappeared, leaving only a note saying "don't search for me." Honoka blames Issei, but he fires back that she drove Hirokazu away through years of mistreatment. Issei enlists journalist Yurika Katase to find his father, and she locates him on train station CCTV footage. Issei then gives a TV interview where he publicly thanks his father—a pointed message to his cold family. Separately, Issei tracks down Alexandre's former interpreter, who reveals the truth: Honoka and Alexandre were deeply in love during his teaching stint in Japan; Hirokazu was a fellow student who witnessed their affair and got drunk in despair, causing Alexandre to be fired. Honoka later married Hirokazu anyway. This implies Issei may actually be Alexandre's biological son. In the Camille storyline, she's offered control of the Léger Guide, but Thomas dismisses her as unready, leading to a fight where she kicks him out.
| 6 | 6 | "Legacy" | Oded Ruskin | Quoc Dang Tran, Clémence Madeleine-Perdrillat & Alice Vial | May 19, 2023 |
Camille and Lorenzo travel to northern Italy to solve the second test. A professor reveals the painting was actually a collaboration between Fede Galizia and her father Nunzio—the "link" isn't about the fruit depicted, but the father-daughter bond. After being rejected by suspicious local winemakers, Camille uses the Léger Guide name to gain access, which works but disturbs her. She eventually discovers their hostile innkeeper, Elisabetta, is the daughter of an eccentric biodynamic winemaker. The wine Alexandre chose was the last vintage Elisabetta made with her dying father—a sacred family creation he'd wanted in his guide but they'd refused. Meanwhile, Issei confronts Honoka about his parentage and obtains DNA evidence. He confides in journalist Yurika that Alexandre was his biological father, and they grow closer. At the final reveal, both Camille and Issei write the correct answer, but Issei inexplicably crosses his out, handing Camille the win. She's furious, feeling he robbed her of a real victory. Later, when Camille declines to take over the Léger Guide, Luca explodes, threatening to ensure she loses the final test and calling her a disappointment.
| 7 | 7 | "Food and Wine" | Oded Ruskin | Quoc Dang Tran, Clémence Madeleine-Perdrillat & Alice Vial | May 26, 2023 |
The final test begins in Paris with a lavish, televised competition. Luca announces the winner will also become editor-in-chief of the Léger Guide—revealing his true motive for courting Camille. Lorenzo secretly tells Camille that Luca owns 45% of the guide and manipulates ratings to profit from vineyards he buys cheap. The first round is wine trivia, where Issei excels. The second is food-wine pairing: Issei impresses the judges with polished choices, while Camille's unconventional red wine pairing with lobster seems to fall flat. Before round three, Marianne apologizes to Camille for sabotaging her relationship with Alexandre, and they reconcile. The contestants are then flown to Philippe's vineyard in France for the final challenge: identify a mystery wine Alexandre selected and recreate it by blending grape varieties. Camille and Issei, forced into proximity, begin opening up. Issei admits he found the Italian wine answer through Alexandre's old teaching notes his mother kept—not skill. Camille confesses her "talent" is actually synesthesia: she sees aromas as colors and sounds. They identify the wine as a 1990 Châteauneuf-du-Pape with 13 possible grape varieties, but must figure out the exact blend ratio.
| 8 | 8 | "All or Nothing" | Oded Ruskin | Quoc Dang Tran, Clémence Madeleine-Perdrillat & Alice Vial | June 2, 2023 |
The final test results come in: it's a tie. Alexandre left a video revealing he planned this—there will be one more "sudden death" challenge: find "the Drops of God." Furious at their father's endless games, Camille nearly quit, but when they learn Luca would inherit everything if they both withdraw, they press on. Camille and Issei drink together in Alexandre's massive cellar, bonding as siblings. Issei reveals the truth about their shared father, confirmed by old photos Philippe found. Yurika locates Hirokazu and urges Issei to see him; though hesitant, Issei later reconciles with the man who raised him, affirming Hirokazu as his true father. At the final answer reveal, Issei guesses a specific Grand Cru wine—wrong. Camille answers "the rain"—correct. She admits Alexandre gave her an unfair advantage: it was a childhood memory he'd shared only with her. She offers to take Luca to court and split the inheritance with Issei as half-siblings, but Issei declines, saying Hirokazu is his only father. Camille auctions off part of the cellar and makes Lorenzo and Miyabi co-editors of the Léger Guide. The season ends with Issei receiving a gift from Camille labeled "Brother & Sister."

=== Season 2 (2026) ===
| No. overall | No. in season | Title | Directed by | Written by | Original release date |
|---|---|---|---|---|---|
| 9 | 1 | "The Present" | Oded Ruskin | Story by : Sonia Moyersoen & Clive Bradley; Teleplay by : Clive Bradley & Sonia Moyersoen | January 21, 2026 |
| 10 | 2 | "The Quest" | Oded Ruskin | Story by : Sonia Moyersoen & Clive Bradley; Teleplay by : Sonia Moyersoen | January 28, 2026 |
| 11 | 3 | "The Origin" | Oded Ruskin | Story by : Sonia Moyersoen & Clive Bradley; Teleplay by : Clive Bradley & Sonia Moyersoen | February 4, 2026 |
| 12 | 4 | "Brother and Sister" | Oded Ruskin | Story by : Sonia Moyersoen & Clive Bradley; Teleplay by : Sonia Moyersoen | February 11, 2026 |
| 13 | 5 | "Trust Me" | Oded Ruskin | Story by : Sonia Moyersoen & Clive Bradley; Teleplay by : Claire Lemaréchal, Simon Jablonka, Clive Bradley & Sonia Moyersoen | February 18, 2026 |
| 14 | 6 | "The Contest" | Oded Ruskin | Story by : Sonia Moyersoen & Clive Bradley; Teleplay by : Claire Lemaréchal & Simon Jablonka | February 25, 2026 |
| 15 | 7 | "Pyrrhus" | Oded Ruskin | Story by : Sonia Moyersoen & Clive Bradley; Teleplay by : Claire Lemaréchal & Simon Jablonka | March 4, 2026 |
| 16 | 8 | "Break Free" | Oded Ruskin | Story by : Sonia Moyersoen & Clive Bradley; Teleplay by : Claire Lemaréchal, Simon Jablonka & Sonia Moyersoen | March 11, 2026 |

== Production ==
The series was created by Quoc Dang Tran, and the series was directed by Oded Ruskin and produced by Klaus Zimmermann. In an interview, Tran revealed that he read all 44 volumes of series and the TV drama spent five years in development, with various experts and consultants to ensure the story was authentic. In this adaptation, the main character Shizuku is portrayed as a French woman instead of a Japanese man, named "Camille", and Shizuku's father, Yukata Kanzaki, is reimagined as Alexandre Léger, the "creator of the Léger Wine Guide and emblematic figure in oenology". French actress Fleur Geffrier and Japanese actor Tomohisa Yamashita are starring as Camille and Issei, respectively. Yamashita took 40 hours of lessons, underwent a strict diet, and watched the 2009 series in preparation for the role. Geffrier also received training from Sébastien Pradal, the show's consulting sommelier and tasting coach for the actors. Filming locations for the series included France, Italy, and Japan.

For Season 2, production lasted for eight months and was filmed in various regions, though most set in Georgia. The fictional Domaine Chassangre château that Camille co-owns in Season 2, was set at the real life Château de Beaucastel owned by the Perrin family in Châteauneuf-du-Pape.

== Release ==
The series premiered on April 21, 2023. In May 2024, the series was renewed for a second season.

Hulu Japan premiered the series exclusively in Japan on September 15, 2023.

== Reception ==
=== Critical response ===
The first season received critical acclaim. On the review aggregator website Rotten Tomatoes, 100% of 28 critics' reviews are positive. The website's consensus reads: "A saga of cutthroat competition with notes of cool intelligence, Drops of God is a sleek entertainment sure to stimulate refined palates." Adam Lock of Ready Steady Cut called the series "a surprisingly refreshing series that takes an entirely ridiculous but fascinating premise and crafts a taut, tense drama out of it," praising its transformation of the wine world into "a kind of sports epic." John Powers of NPR described it as "a high-gloss drama—expensive, lushly-shot and skillfully acted", while noting the challenges of adapting a Japanese manga into a French production. He also observed that while the show takes a more serious approach than its source manga, it successfully balances drama with moments of humor. David Opie of Radio Times drew comparisons to other Apple TV+ productions, noting its "visuals throughout are more luxurious than the finest Cabernet Sauvignon" and comparing its cinematic scale to Pachinko.

For the second season, Rotten Tomatoes reported a 92% approval rating based on 12 critic reviews. The website's critics consensus reads, "With layered characters, cultural richness, and a refined sense of taste and drama, Drops of God matures into an even more compelling and intoxicating series."

== Other media ==
=== Video game ===
In 2024, Softstar has been granted the rights to transform the series into a video game. With the game set in Burgundy, France. It serves as a sequel to Hundred Days – Winemaking Simulator on PC.
