= Louis-Do de Lencquesaing =

French actor and film director (born 1963)

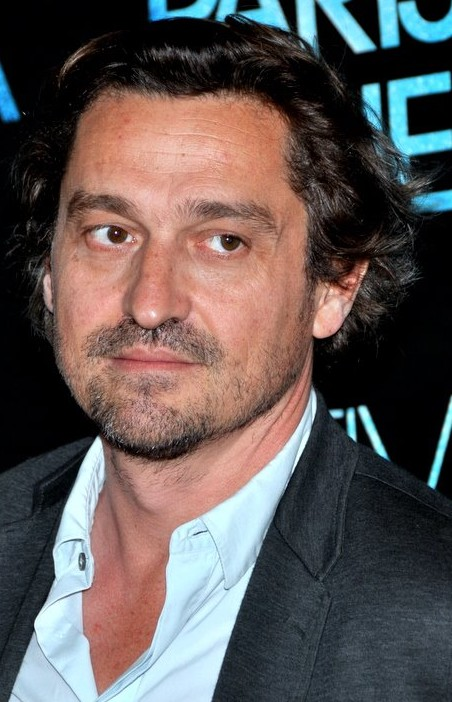
- Louis-Do de Lencquesaing at the 2012 Festival Paris Cinéma
- Born: 25 December 1963 (age 62); Paris, France
- Occupations: Actor, film director

Louis-Do de Lencquesaing (born 25 December 1963) is a French actor and film director. He has a daughter with cinematographer Caroline Champetier, the actress Alice de Lencquesaing.

== Filmography ==
=== As an actor ===
- Les dernières heures du millénaire (1990, Short)
- Madame Bovary (1991)
- La vie des morts (1991) as Nicolas
- Le sommeil d'Adrien (1991, Short) as Adrien
- De l'histoire ancienne (1991, Short)
- The Sentinel (1992)
- Mensonge (1993) as Rémi
- Hélas pour moi (1993) as Ludovic, un élève
- Ainsi Soient-Elles (1995) as Laurent
- Encore (1996) as Bruno
- For Sale (1998)
- Alissa (1998) as Bukovski
- Mécréant (1998, Short) as Vincent
- Les infortunes de la beauté (1999) as François
- Marée haute (1999, Short)
- Sentimental Destinies (2000) as Arthur Pommerel
- Anywhere Out of the World (2000, Short) as Antoine
- A Private Affair (2002) as Philippe
- Le loup de la côte Ouest (2002) as Le commissaire Vianet
- La vie promise (2002) as Maquereau 1
- La bête du Gévaudan (2003, TV Movie) as Beauterne
- Petites coupures (2003) as André
- Les corps impatients (2003) as L'interne Hopital
- Louis la brocante (2003, TV Series) as Joseph Letano
- L'empreinte (2004) as Armand, l'éditeur
- Avocats & associés (2004, TV Series) as Steven Berger
- Face à l'amour (2005, Short) as Vincent
- Les invisibles (2005) as Le physionomiste club échangiste
- Caché (2005) as Bookstore Owner
- Au suivant! (2005) as Le réalisateur
- Un couple parfait (2005) as Vincent
- Vénus & Apollon (2005, TV Series) as Édouard Pages
- Gaspard le bandit (2006, TV Movie) as Le banquier
- La jungle (2006) as L'examinateur
- The Untouchable (2006) as L'amant de Jeanne
- La loi de la forêt (2006)
- Le créneau (2007, Short) as Mathias
- Le sang noir (2007, TV Movie) as Capitaine Plaire
- Dans l'ombre du maître (2007, TV Movie) as Marchelier
- Opération Turquoise (2007, TV Movie)
- Animal singulier (2008, Short) as Simon
- A Day at the Museum (2008) as Jocelyn Paulin
- À l'est de moi (2008) as Le client
- L'école du pouvoir (2009, TV Movie) as Marceau
- Clara, une passion française (2009, TV Movie) as Duvauchelle
- Father of My Children (2009) as Grégoire Canvel
- La femme invisible (d'après une histoire vraie) (2009) as François
- How to Seduce Difficult Women (2009) as Philippe
- Services sacrés (2009, TV Series) as Palmidas
- Le mariage à trois (2010) as Stéphane
- La peau de chagrin (2010, TV Movie) as Taillefer
- Un soupçon d'innocence (2010, TV Movie) as Dominique Roussel
- Même pas en rêve (2010, Short) as Le père de la jeune fille
- Empreintes criminelles (2011, TV Series) as Victor Francis
- Polisse (2011) as M. de la Faublaise
- The Silence of Joan (2011) as Jean de Luxembourg
- House of Tolerance (2011) as Michaux
- My Little Princess (2011) as Antoine Dupuis, l'éditeur
- The Art of Love (2011) as Ludovic
- A Happy Event (2011) as Jean-François Truffard – le prof de philo
- Elles (2011) as Patrick
- Paris Manhattan (2012) as Pierre
- In a Rush (2012) as Paul Bastherlain
- Les coquillettes (2012) as P.-A.
- Superstar (2012) as Jean-Baptiste
- It Boy (2013) as Julien
- Alias Caracalla, au coeur de la Résistance (2013, TV Mini-Series) as Bernard (Emmanuel d'Astier de La Vigerie)
- Kaboul Kitchen (2014, TV Series) as Paul Braque
- Des lendemains qui chantent (2014) as Jacques Sadoun
- Get Well Soon (2014) as Le chirurgien
- The Price of Fame (2014) as L'avocat
- Valentin Valentin (2014) as Freddy Livorno
- Spiral (2014-2020, TV Series)
- The Art Dealer (2015) as Melchior
- Taj Mahal (2015) as Père de Louise
- Francofonia (2015) as Jacques Jaujard
- Looking for Her (2015) as Alex
- Orage (2015) as Pierre
- Blind Sun (2015) as Gilles
- Marseille (2016) as Stéphane
- The Dancer (2016) as Armand Duponchel – le directeur de l'Opéra
- Brice 3 (2016) as Docteur Louis-Do de Bordeaux
- Ares (2016) as PDG Donevia
- Money (2017) as Mercier
- L'Art du crime (2017, TV Series) as Charles Varane
- Le lion est mort ce soir (2017) as Le réalisateur
- One Nation, One King (2018) as Louis XIV
- Paris Pigalle (2018) as Le propriétaire du manoir
- À cause des filles..? (2019) as Bernard
- Convoi exceptionnel (2019) as Arthur Combasse
- Ibiza (2019) as Michel
- La sainte famille (2019) as Jean
- Love Affair(s) (2020) as Le réalisateur
- Lost Illusions (2021)
- Return to Seoul (2022)
- Kompromat as L'ambassadeur de France
- Bardot (2023) as Henri-Georges Clouzot
- Death Will Come (2024)
- Spies of Terror (Les Espions de la terreur) as Commissaire Gomez

=== As a director ===
- Mécréant (short film, 1998)
- Première séance (short film, 2006)
- Même pas en rêve (short film, 2010)
- In a Rush (2012)
- Les 18 du 57, Boulevard de Strasbourg (short film, 2014)
- La sainte famille (2019)
