= Student Services =

2010 French film directed by Emmanuelle Bercot

- Film poster
- Based on: Mes chères études by Laura D.
- Written by: Emmanuelle Bercot
- Directed by: Emmanuelle Bercot
- Starring: Déborah François
- Theme music composer: Frédéric Fortuny
- Country of origin: France
- Original language: French

Production
- Producers: François Kraus; Denis Pineau-Valencienne
- Cinematography: Christophe Offenstein
- Editor: Julien Leloup
- Running time: 108 minutes

Original release
- Release: January 18, 2010

Student Services (French: Mes chères études) is a 2010 French television film directed by Emmanuelle Bercot. It had a theatrical release in Poland and Italy. It is based on the book Mes chères études by Laura D.

== Plot ==
Laura is a college freshman who works in a call centre. One day she faints during a lecture because she hasn't eaten enough. She is advised to sue her parents but they, being working class, cannot afford to pay her more money. A little later when she is at home the energy provider cuts off the power because of overdue payments. Once the electricity is restored, she surfs the internet for an additional job. Eventually she ends up on a website where mature men advertise in order to get to know women. She contacts a man called Joe who wants to pay her for keeping him company. When they meet she is very nervous and obviously very ashamed but her experienced suitor manages to euphemise the situation. He tells her that the business is only about fantasy and nowadays everything is for sale, including fantasy fulfilment. His payment enables her to pay bills and to have a little party. She continues to meet men for money and Joe becomes a regular. But while she gets used to the money, she does not get used to what she has to do for it. Clients overstep lines and cheat her out of her money, and finally even Joe does that. Laura suffers a breakdown.

== Cast ==
- Déborah François as Laura
- Alain Cauchi as Joe
- Mathieu Demy as Benjamin
- Benjamin Siksou as Manu
- Joseph Braconnier as the client in the car
- Marc Chapiteau as the abusive photographer

== Production ==
One of the sex scenes was very difficult to shoot for Déborah François. "I found myself trapped under a guy who weighed 160 kg, naked. I can't watch the scene: I'm crushed. I look dead. I almost cut a take and said, 'I have to breathe!' In addition he was naked ...", she said.

== Reception ==
The critic MaryAnn Johanson wrote the film was "well-acted" and "far more sad than it is scandalous". Other critics also recognised the acting performance of Déborah François but the screenplay was evaluated as unconvincing due to a lack of "proper character development".
