= Mes chères études =

2008 autobiographical book

- Author: Laura D. (Anonymous)
- Language: French
- Publisher: Max Milo Editions
- Publication date: 10 January 2008
- Pages: 273

Mes chères études (My Dear Studies in English) is a 2008 autobiographical book by an anonymous author known as "Laura D.", a modern language student at a university in Paris. The book has drawn national attention in France with its controversial contents, in which the author claimed that she had to go into prostitution to financially support her studies.

In 2010, a French film titled Mes chères études (English title: Student Services) was made based on the book. It was directed by Emmanuelle Bercot and starred Déborah François.
