= Maestro (2014 film) =

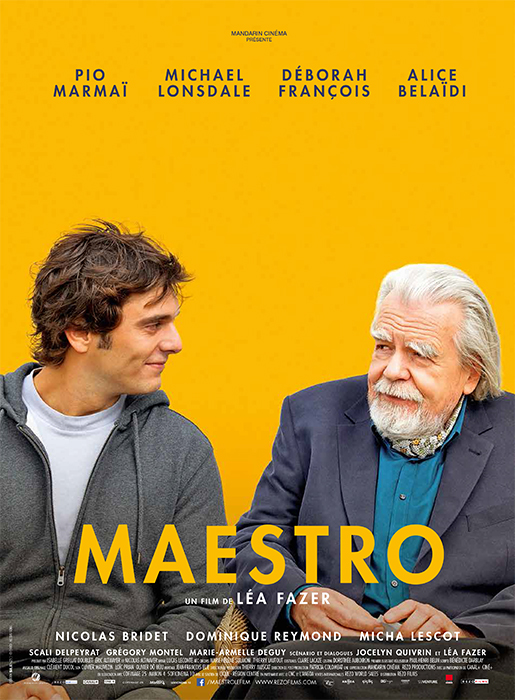
- Theatrical release poster
- Directed by: Léa Fazer
- Written by: Léa Fazer; Jocelyn Quivrin
- Produced by: Éric Altmayer; Nicolas Altmayer; Isabelle Grellat
- Starring: Pio Marmaï; Michael Lonsdale; Déborah François; Alice Belaïdi
- Cinematography: Lucas Leconte
- Edited by: Jean-François Elie
- Music by: Clément Ducol
- Production companies: Mandarin Cinéma; Rezo Productions
- Distributed by: Rezo Films
- Release dates: 15 June 2014 (Champs-Élysées); 23 July 2014 (France)
- Running time: 85 minutes
- Country: France
- Language: French
- Budget: $4 million
- Box office: $358.000

Maestro is a 2014 French comedy-drama film directed by Léa Fazer. The idea of the film came from co-writer Jocelyn Quivrin's experience of working with director Éric Rohmer in 2006 on Rohmer's last film Romance of Astree and Celadon. It stars Pio Marmaï, Michael Lonsdale, Déborah François and Alice Belaïdi.

== Plot ==
Maestro is a semi-autobiographical French dramedy inspired by actor Jocelyn Quivrin's experiences on the set of Eric Rohmer's final film. It follows Henri, a struggling actor who dreams of becoming an action star but finds himself cast in a low-budget, poetic costume drama directed by the enigmatic and aging auteur Cedric Rovere. Initially dismissive of the film's artistic style, Henri focuses on pursuing a romantic interest in his co-star Gloria, but the real story lies in his evolving mentorship with Rovere.

As the film progresses, Henri undergoes a transformation, learning to appreciate culture and art under Rovere's subtle guidance. Meanwhile, Rovere's interactions with Henri bring a playful, modern energy to his otherwise quiet and reflective life. The relationship between the two becomes the emotional core of the film, evolving into a tender exploration of personal growth and intergenerational connection.

Set against the picturesque French countryside, the film captures the aesthetic charm of Rohmer's style, with sunlit visuals and a reflective tone. Featuring standout performances by Pio Marmai as Henri and Michael Lonsdale as Rovere, the movie offers a light yet poignant behind-the-scenes look at the world of cinema and mentorship.

== Cast ==
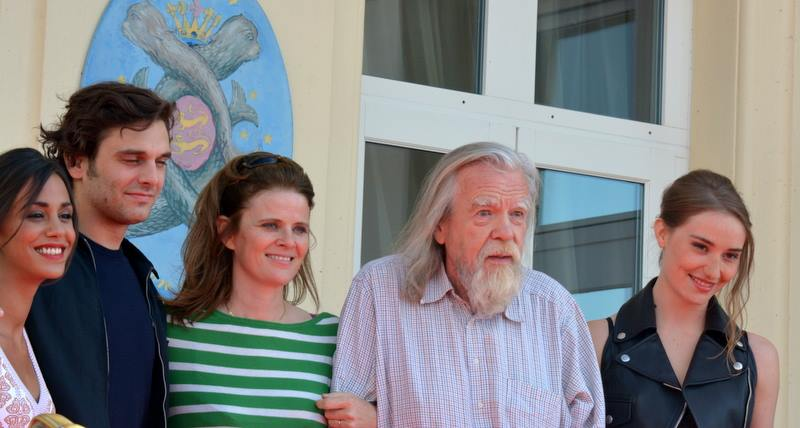
Alice Belaïdi, Pio Marmaï, Léa Fazer, Michael Lonsdale and Déborah François at the Cabourg Film Festival.

- Pio Marmaï as Henri Renaud
- Michael Lonsdale as Cédric Rovère
- Déborah François as Gloria
- Alice Belaïdi as Pauline Vatel
- Nicolas Bridet as Nico
- Dominique Reymond as Francine
- Micha Lescot as José
- Scali Delpeyrat as The Druid
- Grégory Montel as Sam
- Marie-Armelle Deguy as Marie-Jeanne

== Production ==
Most scenes in the film were shot over the course of four weeks at the end of summer 2013 in the southern part of the Indre department, in and around the village of Gargilesse. Locations included the Château de Gargilesse, the banks of the Creuse river, Montcocu Beach in Baraize, the fields of Châtillon, and at Le Gaboulet picnic area in Saint-Plantaire.

== Reception ==
The Hollywood Reporter gave it a positive review with some reservations. In summary it stated that while the film starts off light and somewhat shallow, it gains depth, showcasing a touching mentor-student relationship. Strong performances by Pio Marmai and Michael Lonsdale elevate the film, with Lonsdale delivering a particularly nuanced and memorable portrayal. The movie captures the essence of Rohmer's style through its visuals and pacing, though the score is overly sentimental. It is expected to appeal mainly to niche audiences and Nouvelle Vague enthusiasts.

On Rotten Tomatoes, the audience has given it a 52% rating on the Tomatometer.

== Accolades ==
Award / Film Festival	Category	Recipients and nominees	Result
Magritte Awards	Best Actress	Déborah François	Nominated
Saas-Fee Filmfest 1	Critics' Choice		Won
