= Our Futures =

- Film poster
- French: Nos futurs
- Directed by: Rémi Bezançon
- Written by: Rémi Bezançon; Jean-François Halin; Vanessa Portal
- Produced by: Isabelle Grellat
- Starring: Pio Marmaï; Pierre Rochefort; Mélanie Bernier
- Cinematography: Antoine Monod
- Edited by: Fabrice Rouaud
- Music by: Pierre Adenot
- Production companies: Mandarin Cinéma; France 2 Cinéma; Gaumont
- Distributed by: Gaumont
- Release dates: 8 June 2015 (Brussels FF); 22 July 2015 (France)
- Running time: 97 minutes
- Country: France
- Language: French
- Budget: $7 million
- Box office: $1 million

Our Futures (French: Nos futurs) is a 2015 French comedy-drama film directed and co-written by Rémi Bezançon. The film stars Pio Marmaï, Pierre Rochefort and Mélanie Bernier.

== Plot ==
Yann Kerbec is in his thirties and has been leading a mundane and stale life. One day, he decides to meet up with Thomas, a childhood friend whom he has not seen since his high school days and together they set out to revisit and relive the past.

== Cast ==
- Pio Marmaï as Thomas
- Pierre Rochefort as Yann Kerbec
- Mélanie Bernier as Estelle
- Kyan Khojandi as Max
- Camille Cottin as Géraldine
- Laurence Arné as Emma
- Roxane Mesquida as Virginie
- Micha Lescot as Samy
- Aurélien Wiik as Vincent
- Thibault Duboucher as Nico
- Jean-Pierre Lorit as Michel
- Samuel Theis as Yann's father
