= Spies of Terror =

French television spy thriller miniseries

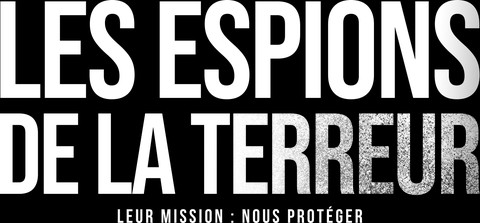
- Also known as: Les espions de la terreur
- Genre: Spy thriller, crime drama
- Created by: Franck Philippon
- Based on: Les espions de la terreur (2018) by Matthieu Suc
- Screenplay by: Franck Philippon; Matthieu Suc; Claire Lemaréchal
- Directed by: Rodolphe Tissot
- Starring: Rachida Brakni; Fleur Geffrier; Vincent Elbaz; Pierre Perrier; Louis-Do de Lencquesaing
- Music by: Philippe Jakko
- Country of origin: France
- Original language: French
- No. of seasons: 1
- No. of episodes: 4

Production
- Running time: 48–61 min.

Original release
- Network: M6+
- Release: June 2024

Spies of Terror, or Les espions de la terreur, is a French spy thriller, crime drama television miniseries, which was streamed from June 2024 via M6+. It is a dramatisation of the investigation of the November 2015 Paris attacks, by French Secret Service agents. It was created by Franck Philippon based on Matthieu Suc's book, Les espions de la terreur (2018). Its four episodes are directed by Rodolphe Tissot. Philippe Jakko won the Festival de la Fiction's Best Music prize, in La Rochelle, September 2023. The main characters are Malika (Rachida Brakni), Lucie (Fleur Geffrier), Vincent (Vincent Elbaz), Alexandre (Pierre Perrier) and Gomez (Louis-Do de Lencquesaing).

== Premise ==
Following the November 2015 Paris attacks, French Secret Service agents from Directorate-General for External Security (DGSE), General Directorate for Internal Security (DGSI) and Direction Zonale de la Sécurité Intérieure (DZSI) cooperate to hunt the perpetrators.

== Cast and characters ==
- Rachida Brakni as Malika Berthier: DGSE head of European office, leads investigation into terrorist network's leaders
- Fleur Geffrier as Lucie Kessler: DGSI Commandant, supervises judicial police response to attacks
- Vincent Elbaz as Vincent Morin: DZSI Major in Lille
- Pierre Perrier as Alexandre Lebrun: DGSI Commandant, Lucie's partner
- Louis-Do de Lencquesaing as Gomez: DGSI Commissaire, Lucie's boss
- Rachid Guellaz as Saïd: Muslim, suspected drug-dealer, worried about radicalised younger brother
- Olivier Faliez as Demoustier: Colonel, Alexandre's boss
- Cédric Vieira as Benoît: Malika's husband
- David Geselson as Sébastien Le Tallec
- Julie Duclos as Manon: works for Lucie
- Azad Boutella as Le Repenti (English: The Repentant) Aziz Bellaoui: prisoner, Lucie's informant
- Bellamine Abdelmalek as Anis Bahri: radicalised Muslim, suspected terrorist
- Walid Ben Mabrouk as Reda Kriket: radicalised Muslim, Anis' associate

== Production ==
In November 2019 Tetra Media Fiction acquired the rights to Matthieu Suc's book, Les Espions de la Terreur (November 2018), to adapt it into a television series. Spies of Terror was created and written by Franck Philippon and directed by Rodolphe Tissot.

== Episode guide ==
No. in season	Title	Directed by	Written by	Original release date
1	"Episode 1"	Rodolphe Tissot	Franck Philippon, Matthieu Suc, Claire Lemaréchal	June 2024
2	"Episode 2"	Rodolphe Tissot	Franck Philippon, Matthieu Suc, Claire Lemaréchal	June 2024
3	"Episode 3"	Rodolphe Tissot	Franck Philippon, Matthieu Suc, Claire Lemaréchal	June 2024
4	"Episode 4"	Rodolphe Tissot	Franck Philippon, Matthieu Suc, Claire Lemaréchal	June 2024
