= Rachida Brakni =

French actress

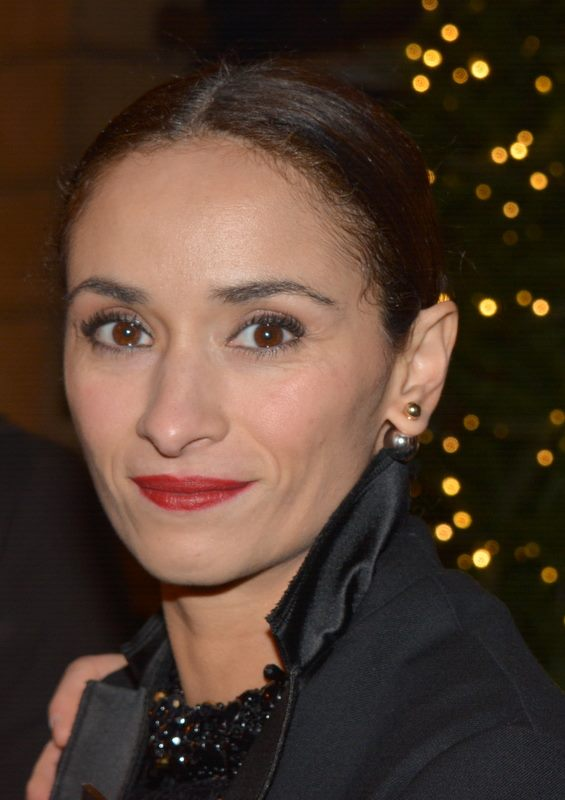
- Rachida Brakni at 2015 César Awards
- Born: 15 February 1977 (age 49); Paris, France
- Occupation: Actress
- Years active: 2001–present
- Spouse: Eric Cantona (m. 2007)
- Children: 2

Rachida Brakni (born 15 February 1977) is a French actress and producer.

== Biography ==
In 2001, she joined the Comédie Française, as a member of which she won a Molière Award for her performance in Ruy Blas. In 2002, she was awarded the César Award for Most Promising Actress for her performance in Chaos.

In 2010, she directed her husband, Éric Cantona, in Face au paradis (In Front of Paradise), a contemporary play. The production opened at Théâtre Marigny on the Champs-Élysées on 26 January 2010.

In 2012, she became the face of the fashion brand The Kooples in an advertising campaign.

== Personal life ==
Brakni was born in France to Algerian parents. She is married to actor and former professional footballer Eric Cantona.

== Selected filmography ==
- Chaos (2001)
- Loin (2001)
- The Overeater (L'Outremangeur) (2003)
- Portrait caché (2003)
- Ne Quittez pas ! (2004)
- Mon Accident (2004)
- L'Enfant endormi (2005)
- Une Belle histoire (2005)
- Barakat ! (2006)
- La Surprise (TV) (2006)
- On ne devrait pas exister (2006)
- La Part animale (2007)
- Lisa et le pilote d'avion (2007)
- A Man and His Dog (2009)
- Neuilly sa mère ! (2009)
- Face au paradis (2010)
- La Ligne droite (2011)
- Let Them Come (2015)
- Neuilly sa mère, sa mère ! (2018)
- Lonely Planet (2024)
- Spies of Terror (Les Espions de la terreur [2024])
