= Fleur Geffrier =

French actress

- Born: August 24, 1986 (age 39); Tarn, France
- Occupation: Actress

Fleur Geffrier is a French actress.

== Biography ==
=== Early life and education ===
Fleur Geffrier was born on August 24, 1986, in Tarn, France, to a chef father and a housewife mother.

She pursued a master's degree in Performing Arts in Nice. In 2008, she moved to Paris to join the theatrical training studio in Vitry-sur-Seine, where she also tried her hand at directing (Macbett by Eugène Ionesco). In 2013, she passed the entrance exam for the free class at the Cours Florent.

=== Career ===
In 2015, Fleur Geffrier began her acting career on television, appearing in an episode of the police series Profilage and in the TV movie Mystère à l'Opéra by Léa Fazer, as well as the short film Don't be afraid by Étienne Grosbois.

In 2016, she played a waitress in the thriller Elle by Paul Verhoeven and Madeleine in the romantic film Mon ange by Harry Cleven.

In 2020, she appeared in the German war series Das Boot, a sequel to the German film of the same name (1981) by Wolfgang Petersen, itself adapted from the novel The Styx (1973) and the novella Die Festung by Lothar-Günther Buchheim.

In August 2021, she was cast alongside Japanese actor Tomohisa Yamashita in the series Drops of God (2023), an adaptation of the manga of the same name by Tadashi Agi and Shu Okimoto. She appeared as Lucie in the television miniseries Spies of Terror (Les Espions de la terreur [2024]).
