= The Page Turner =

- United States theatrical poster
- Directed by: Denis Dercourt
- Written by: Denis Dercourt
- Produced by: Michel Saint-Jean
- Starring: Catherine Frot; Déborah François; Pascal Greggory
- Cinematography: Jérôme Peyrebrune
- Edited by: François Gédigier
- Music by: Jérôme Lemonnier
- Distributed by: Tartan Films (USA)
- Release dates: 19 June 2006 (Cannes Film Festival); 9 August 2006 (France)
- Running time: 85 minutes
- Country: France
- Language: French
- Budget: $4.2 million (€3.07 million)
- Box office: $11.1 million

The Page Turner (French: La Tourneuse de pages) is a 2006 French film directed by Denis Dercourt. It was screened in the Un Certain Regard section at the 2006 Cannes Film Festival. The $4.2 million (€3.07 million) film went on to become an international box office success, grossing $11.1 million worldwide.

== Plot ==
A young girl, Mélanie Prouvost, aspires to be a pianist and auditions in front of famous pianist Ariane Fouchécourt for a place at a conservatoire. Ariane signs an autograph for an admirer during the recital, distracting Mélanie and affecting her performance. She leaves the audition with her mother, heartbroken.

Some years later Mélanie, having studied hard, finds a work experience placement at a solicitors. Perhaps coincidentally we find the husband of the famous pianist for whom she previously auditioned. The story develops as the young woman ingratiates herself into the life of the family, becoming a holiday carer for the young son who the family hopes will follow in the footsteps of the mother as a famous pianist. Befriending the boy, Melanie encourages him to prepare a full piano recital performance for the father's return to the family home after a business trip. She also manages to become indispensable to Ariane, both practically and emotionally. Melanie's perfectly timed page turning, combined with her composure and apparent empathy, enable Ariane to recover a confidence in performance that she thought she had lost after a traumatic car crash.

A very close and intimate relationship is established between the two women with Mélanie becoming obsessed with Ariane in order to get revenge for the humiliation that she suffered as a child. She manages to seduce Ariane and then abandons her but twists the emotional knife by revealing the relationship to Ariane's husband.

== Cast ==
- Catherine Frot – Ariane Fouchécourt
- Déborah François – Mélanie Prouvost
- Pascal Greggory – Jean Fouchécourt
- Clotilde Mollet – Virginie
- Xavier De Guillebon – Laurent
- Christine Citti – Madame Prouvost
- Jacques Bonnaffé – Monsieur Prouvost
- Antoine Martynciow – Tristan Fouchécourt
- Julie Richalet – Young Mélanie Prouvost
- Martine Chevallier – Jackie Onfray
- André Marcon – Werker
- Michèle Ernou – Monique

== Reception ==
On the review aggregator website Rotten Tomatoes, 77% of 65 critics' reviews are positive, with an average rating of 6.8/10. The website's consensus reads: "Reminiscent of Hitchcock and Chabrol, The Page Turner is elegant yet suspenseful, a revenge potboiler of a high degree." On Metacritic, the film has a score of 67% based on reviews from 16 critics, indicating "generally favorable reviews".
