= Looking for Her =

2015 film by Ounie Lecomte

- Theatrical release poster
- Directed by: Ounie Lecomte
- Written by: Ounie Lecomte; Agnès de Sacy
- Produced by: Laurent Lavolé
- Starring: Céline Sallette; Anne Benoît
- Cinematography: Caroline Champetier
- Edited by: Tina Baz
- Music by: Ibrahim Maalouf
- Production company: Gloria Films
- Distributed by: Diaphana Films
- Release dates: 2 October 2015 (Bussan); 6 January 2016
- Running time: 100 minutes
- Language: French
- Budget: $2.2 million
- Box office: $330,000

Looking for Her (or Je vous souhaite d'être follement aimée) is a 2015 French drama film directed by Ounie Lecomte.

== Plot ==
Elisa, physiotherapist, went to live with her young son, Noé, in Dunkirk, the town where she was born under X. A few months earlier, she began researching her biological mother, but the woman refused to reveal her identity. In search of an unknown mother, her past and their history, Elisa did not give up and wants to understand as luck will change their expectations ...

== Cast ==
- Céline Sallette : Elisa Bérard
- Anne Benoît : Annette Lefèvre
- Elyes Aguis : Noé
- Françoise Lebrun : Renée Lefèvre
- Louis-Do de Lencquesaing : Alex
- Catherine Mouchet : Madame Kubiak
- Pascal Elso : Roger
- Micha Lescot : Fabio
- Hajer Maghraoui : Hourya
- Amin Mahroug : Sofiane
- Vincent Pietton : Martel
- Vincent Perini : Benoît
- Juliette Barry : Marie
- Elya Focqueu : Fanny
- Théo Focqueu : Grégoire
- Jeannine Dhersins : Madame Desmaret
- Mounia Raoui : Karima
