= Louise Bourgoin =

French actress

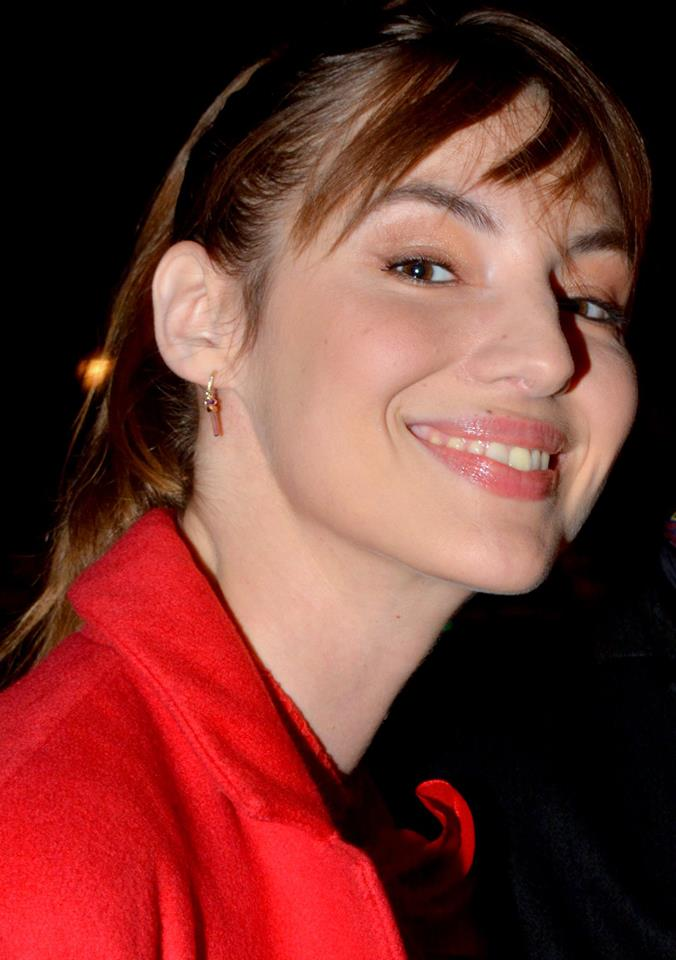
- Bourgoin in January 2018
- Born: Ariane Louise Bourgoin; 28 November 1981 (age 44); Rennes, France
- Occupations: Actress; model; television presenter
- Years active: 2004–present
- Partner: Tanguy Destable (2013–2023)
- Children: 2

Louise Bourgoin (French: [lwiz buʁgwɛ̃]; born Ariane Louise Bourgoin, 28 November 1981) is a French actress, model, and television presenter.

== Life and career ==
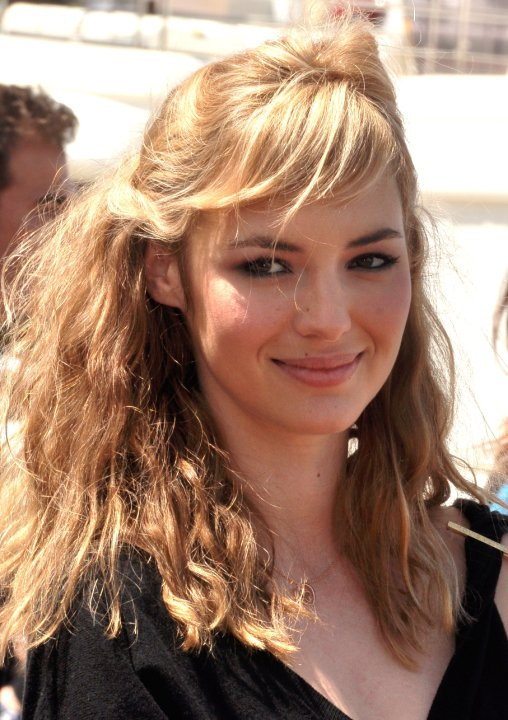
Louise Bourgoin at the 2010 Cannes Film Festival

Bourgoin was born on 28 November 1981 in Rennes. Bourgoin's parents, both secondary level teachers, encouraged her to pursue a stable career. She studied for five years at the École des Beaux-Arts in Rennes. She became a plastic arts teacher while simultaneously beginning to work as a model; some of her most notable early work as a model was for the photographer Ian Sanderson.

After graduating in 2004, Bourgoin became a presenter for the television program Kawaï ! on Filles TV channel. Two years later, she made a brief appearance on Direct 8. At the same time, she worked with TV presenter Marc Lacombe on a pilot program for PlayStation TV. This television channel never started broadcasting, and the pilot was never distributed.

In 2006, she worked as the weather girl for Le Grand Journal with Michel Denisot, which broadcast nightly on Canal+. To avoid audiences confusing her for fellow Le Grand Journal presenter, Ariane Massenet, Bourgoin selected the pseudonym of "Salomé". As this was rejected by Canal +, she chose the name "Louise Bourgoin" as a tribute to her favorite sculptor, Louise Bourgeois.

In 2007 she was offered a role in a film, playing a television weather girl in The Girl From Monaco. Subsequently, she played in several films including The Extraordinary Adventures of Adèle Blanc-Sec directed by Luc Besson and Black Heaven directed by Gilles Marchand, a film that was screened Out of Competition at the 2010 Cannes Film Festival.

== Personal life ==
In December 2015, it was announced that Bourgoin and her boyfriend, electronic musician Tanguy Destable, better known as Tepr, were expecting their first child. Bourgoin gave birth to her son, Étienne, on 7 April 2016. In 2020, she gave birth to a second son, Vadim. The couple separated in 2023.

== Filmography ==
Year	Title	Role	Notes
2008	The Girl from Monaco	Audrey Varella	Nominated—César Award for Most Promising Actress
2008	Les Bonus de Guillaume	Louise/Various Characters	TV series
2009	Little Nicholas	Florist	
2010	White as Snow	Michèle	
2010	Sweet Valentine	Camille	
2010	The Extraordinary Adventures of Adèle Blanc-Sec	Adèle Blanc-Sec	
2010	Black Heaven	Audrey	
2011	A Happy Event	Barbara Dray	
2011	Love Lasts Three Years	Alice	
2013	The Nun	Supérieure Christine	
2013	The Love Punch	Manon	
2013	Going Away	Sandra	
2013	Tirez la langue, mademoiselle	Judith Durance	
2015	Mojave	Milly	
2015	I Am a Soldier	Sandrine	Cabourg Film Festival - Best Actress; Cairo International Film Festival - Best Actress
2015	The White Knights	Laura Turine	
2015	La Fin de la nuit	Marie Desqueyroux	TV movie
2017	Sous le même toit	Delphine Parisot	
2017	L'Un dans l'autre	Penelope	
2018	Les Dents, pipi, et au lit		
2018	The Romanoffs	Sophie	TV series; episode: "The Violet Hour"
2018, 2021	Hippocrate	Chloé Antovska	TV series; 16 episodes
2023	Anti-Squat	Inès Viviani	
2023	A Real Job	Sandrine Deleyziat	
2024	Latin for All	Delphine Fiat	
2024	Je le jure	Julia Schuman	
2024	Monsieur Spade	Marguerite (Peggy) Devereaux	TV series; 6 episodes
2026	Moulin	Comtesse de Forez	
