= Going Away =

2013 film

- Film poster
- Directed by: Nicole Garcia
- Written by: Jacques Fieschi; Nicole Garcia
- Produced by: Philippe Martin
- Starring: Louise Bourgoin; Pierre Rochefort; Dominique Sanda; Déborah François; Éric Ruf
- Cinematography: Pierre Milon
- Edited by: Simon Jacquet
- Music by: Éric Neveux
- Distributed by: Diaphana Films
- Release dates: 8 September 2013 (TIFF); 5 February 2014 (France)
- Running time: 95 minutes
- Country: France
- Language: French
- Budget: $5.8 million
- Box office: $2.3 million

Going Away (French: Un beau dimanche) is a 2013 French drama film directed by Nicole Garcia. It was screened in the Special Presentation section at the 2013 Toronto International Film Festival.

== Cast ==
- Louise Bourgoin as Sandra
- Pierre Rochefort as Baptiste Cambière
- Dominique Sanda as Liliane Cambière
- Déborah François as Emmanuelle Cambière
- Éric Ruf as Gilles Cambière
- Benjamin Lavernhe as Thomas Cambière
- Mathias Brezot as Mathias
- Olivier Loustau as Patrick
- Jean-Pierre Martins as Balou
- Juliette Roux-Merveille as Lili
- Michel Bompoil as Franck
- Alexandre Charlet as Deuxième voyou
