= Pierre Rochefort =

French actor and singer (born 1981)

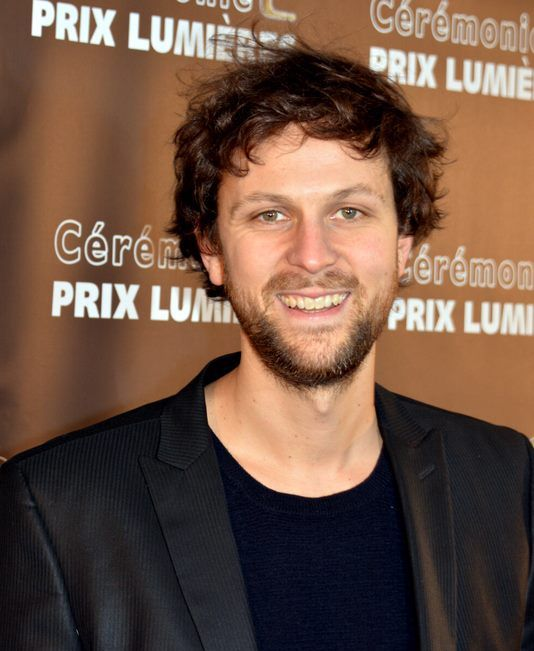
- Rochefort at the Lumière Awards 2015
- Born: 1981 (age 44–45); Paris, France
- Occupations: Actor, singer
- Years active: 1986–present

Pierre Rochefort (born 1981) is a French actor and singer. He is the son of Jean Rochefort and Nicole Garcia. At the age of five, he appeared in the 1986 short film 15 août which was directed by his mother. In 2005, he made his foray into music and founded his own record label "Homworkz". More recently, he has appeared in television, stage and film productions, including the film Going Away, for which he won the award for Male Revelation at the 2014 Cabourg Film Festival.

== Filmography ==
Year	Title	Role	Notes
1986	15 août	Le fils	
2009	Rapt	Fostier	
2010	A View of Love	Garçon de café Nice	
2012	One Night	Le jeune officier de police	
2012	Farewell, My Queen	Le valet Antonin	
2012	The Returned	Médecin	TV series
2013	Going Away	Baptiste Cambière	Cabourg Film Festival—Male Revelation; Nominated—César Award for Most Promising Actor; Nominated—Lumière Award for Best Male Revelation
2015	Our Futures	Yann Kerbec	
2016	Marie et les naufragés	Siméon Forest	

== Discography ==
- Trente Trois Tours (2016)
- Free Your Mind (2019)
