= The First Day of the Rest of Your Life (film) =

- Theatrical release poster
- French: Le Premier Jour du reste de ta vie
- Directed by: Rémi Bezançon
- Written by: Rémi Bezançon
- Produced by: Éric Altmayer; Nicolas Altmayer
- Starring: Jacques Gamblin; Zabou Breitman; Déborah François; Marc-André Grondin; Pio Marmaï
- Cinematography: Antoine Monod
- Edited by: Sophie Reine
- Music by: Sinclair
- Distributed by: StudioCanal
- Release dates: 13 June 2008 (Cabourg Film Festival); 23 July 2008 (France)
- Running time: 114 minutes
- Country: France
- Language: French
- Budget: $5.9 million
- Box office: $13.2 million

The First Day of the Rest of Your Life (French: Le Premier Jour du reste de ta vie) is a 2008 French comedy-drama film written and directed by Rémi Bezançon. The film received 9 César Award nominations, winning three (Best Editing, Most Promising Actor and Most Promising Actress).

== Cast ==
- Jacques Gamblin as Robert Duval
- Zabou Breitman as Marie-Jeanne Duval
- Déborah François as Fleur Duval
- Marc-André Grondin as Raphaël Duval
- Pio Marmaï as Albert Duval
- Roger Dumas as Pierre
- Cécile Cassel as Prune
- Stanley Weber as Éric
- Sarah Cohen-Hadria as Clara
- Camille De Pazzis as Moïra
- François-Xavier Demaison as Doctor Marcaurel
- Gilles Lellouche as The white rasta

== Reception ==
On the review aggregator website Rotten Tomatoes, the film holds an approval rating of 81%, based on 21 reviews, with an average rating of 7.3/10.

== Awards and nominations ==
- César Awards (France)
  - Won: Best Editing (Sophie Reine)
  - Won: Most Promising Actor (Marc-André Grondin)
  - Won: Most Promising Actress (Déborah François)
  - Nominated: Best Actor – Leading Role (Jacques Gamblin)
  - Nominated: Best Director (Rémi Bezançon)
  - Nominated: Best Film
  - Nominated: Best Music (Sinclair)
  - Nominated: Best Original Screenplay (Rémi Bezançon)
  - Nominated: Most Promising Actor (Pio Marmaï)
- Étoiles d'Or (France)
  - Won: Best Writer (Rémi Bezançon)
