= L'Un dans l'autre =

- Directed by: Bruno Chiche
- Written by: Bruno Chiche; Nicolas Mercier; Fabrice Roger-Lacan
- Produced by: Vendôme Production
- Starring: Louise Bourgoin; Stéphane De Groodt; Pierre-François Martin-Laval
- Release date: 20 September 2017
- Running time: 85 minutes
- Countries: France; Belgium
- Language: French

L'Un dans l'autre is a French-Belgian fantasy comedy film directed by Bruno Chiche and released in 2017.

== Plot ==
Two couples have been friends for years. The first couple, Pierre and Aimée, are in their forties and parents of a boy and a girl. The second couple, Éric and Pénélope, plan on getting married in order to be able to adopt a child. Everything is perfect, except that Pierre and Pénélope are lovers. They wake up one day in the body of the other one and have to deal with the life of the other one while trying to find a solution to this dilemma.

== Cast ==
- Louise Bourgoin as Pénélope/Pierre
- Stéphane De Groodt as Pierre/Pénélope
- Pierre-François Martin-Laval as Éric
- Aure Atika as Aimée
- Ginnie Watson as Diane Lelong
- Jean-Benoît Ugeux as the psychologist
- Anne Benoît as Françoise
- Philippe Vieux as Philippe
- Jean-Paul Muel as the doctor

== Production ==
The film was shot in Paris, the towns of Joinville-le-Pont, Saint-Maur-des-Fossés and Nogent-sur-Marne in the department of Val-de-Marne, the town of Vélizy-Villacoublay in the department of Yvelines, and the town of Gonesse in the department of Val-d'Oise.

== Broadcast on French television ==
| Date | Hour | Channel | Audience | Percentage |
|---|---|---|---|---|
| Thursday 12 August 2021 | 21:05 | TF1 | 2,907,000 viewers | 16.5% of the audience |
| Sunday 6 August 2023 | 21:10 | France 2 | 1,805,000 viewers | 10.1% of the audience |
