= The Girl from Monaco =

- Theatrical release poster
- Directed by: Anne Fontaine
- Written by: Anne Fontaine; Benoît Graffin
- Produced by: Philippe Carcassonne; Bruno Pésery
- Starring: Fabrice Luchini; Roschdy Zem; Louise Bourgoin; Stéphane Audran
- Cinematography: Patrick Blossier
- Edited by: Maryline Monthieux
- Music by: Philippe Rombi
- Production companies: Canal+ Soudaine Compagnie
- Distributed by: Warner Bros. Pictures
- Release date: 20 August 2008 (France)
- Running time: 95 minutes
- Country: France
- Language: French
- Box office: $7.5 million

The Girl from Monaco (French: La Fille de Monaco) is a 2008 French comedy-drama film directed by Anne Fontaine. The film stars Fabrice Luchini, Roschdy Zem, Louise Bourgoin, and Stéphane Audran.

== Plot ==
Middle-aged and highly successful lawyer Bertrand Beauvois (Fabrice Luchini) is hired by Monaco businessman Louis Lassalle (Gilles Cohen) to defend his mother Édith Lassalle (Stéphane Audran), who has killed her former lover. Lassalle assigns a bodyguard to Beauvois, Christophe Abadi (Roschdy Zem).

Audrey Varella (Louise Bourgoin), a beautiful but highly promiscuous local TV weather girl whose previous lovers include Christophe, enamors Beauvois, hoping to make a better life with him. This despite the warnings of Christophe to Beauvois, who have formed a bond of friendship, to stay away from her.

Audrey spends all her time with Beauvois, including nights of exhausting wild sex, and Beauvois entreats Christophe to make her disappear from his life. He then continues to the court for his final plead in the Lassalle case.

After having sex with her, Christophe pushes Audrey and her scooter off the road and kills her. Beauvois willingly takes the blame. In one of the last scenes, we see Mrs. Lassalle being freed from prison after only one year of imprisonment while Beauvois remains among the inmates.

== Cast ==
- Fabrice Luchini as Bertrand Beauvois
- Roschdy Zem as Christophe Abadi
- Louise Bourgoin as Audrey Varella
- Stéphane Audran as Édith Lassalle (Final film before her death 10 years later)
- Jeanne Balibar as Hélène
- Gilles Cohen as Louis Lassalle
- Alexandre Steiger as Alain
- Philippe Duclos as Inspector Taurand
- Christophe Vandevelde as Tony

== Reception ==
On the review aggregator website Rotten Tomatoes, The Girl from Monaco holds a 47% approval rating based on 53 reviews, with an average rating of 5.7/10. The consensus reads: "Undeniably slight, this satiric thriller suffers from an uneven tone and a relative lack of thrills, but solid performances from the cast help keep it afloat". On Metacritic, the film was reviewed by 19 critics and got a rank of 52 out of a 100, indicating "mixed or average reviews".

== Awards and nominations ==
- César Awards (France)
  - Nominated: Best Actor – Supporting Role (Roschdy Zem)
  - Nominated: Most Promising Actress (Louise Bourgoin)
