= Hundred Days (video game) =

2021 video game

Hundred Days - Winemaking Simulator
- Developer(s): Broken Arms Games
- Publisher(s): Broken Arms Games
- Engine: Unity
- Platform(s): Windows; MacOS; iOS
- Release: May 13, 2021
- Genre(s): Business simulation
- Mode(s): Single-player

Hundred Days - Winemaking Simulator is a business simulation game developed and released by Italian studio Broken Arms Games for PC and iOS on May 13, 2021.

In the game, players manage a vineyard, performing and monitoring various tasks in the wine-making process. Such tasks include picking, fermenting, bottling, transporting, and many more. The game was designed by Yves Hohler, who grew up on his family's Italian winery and ran it as an adult.

Upon release, the game received generally positive reviews, with critics praising its depth. However, the game has also been criticized for being too repetitive.

== Reception ==
Reception

Aggregate score
Aggregator	Score
Metacritic	74/100

Review scores
Publication	Score
Eurogamer	70/100
IGN	7.5/10

Hundred Days received generally positive reviews upon release.

Critics praising the game mostly focused on its uniqueness and depth.

Criticism revolved around the game's lack of replayability, with critics saying, "The game is full of small details that you will enjoy discovering. However, it doesn't shine for long because of its repetitiveness.
