= Nicole Garcia =

French actress, film director, and screenwriter (born 1946)

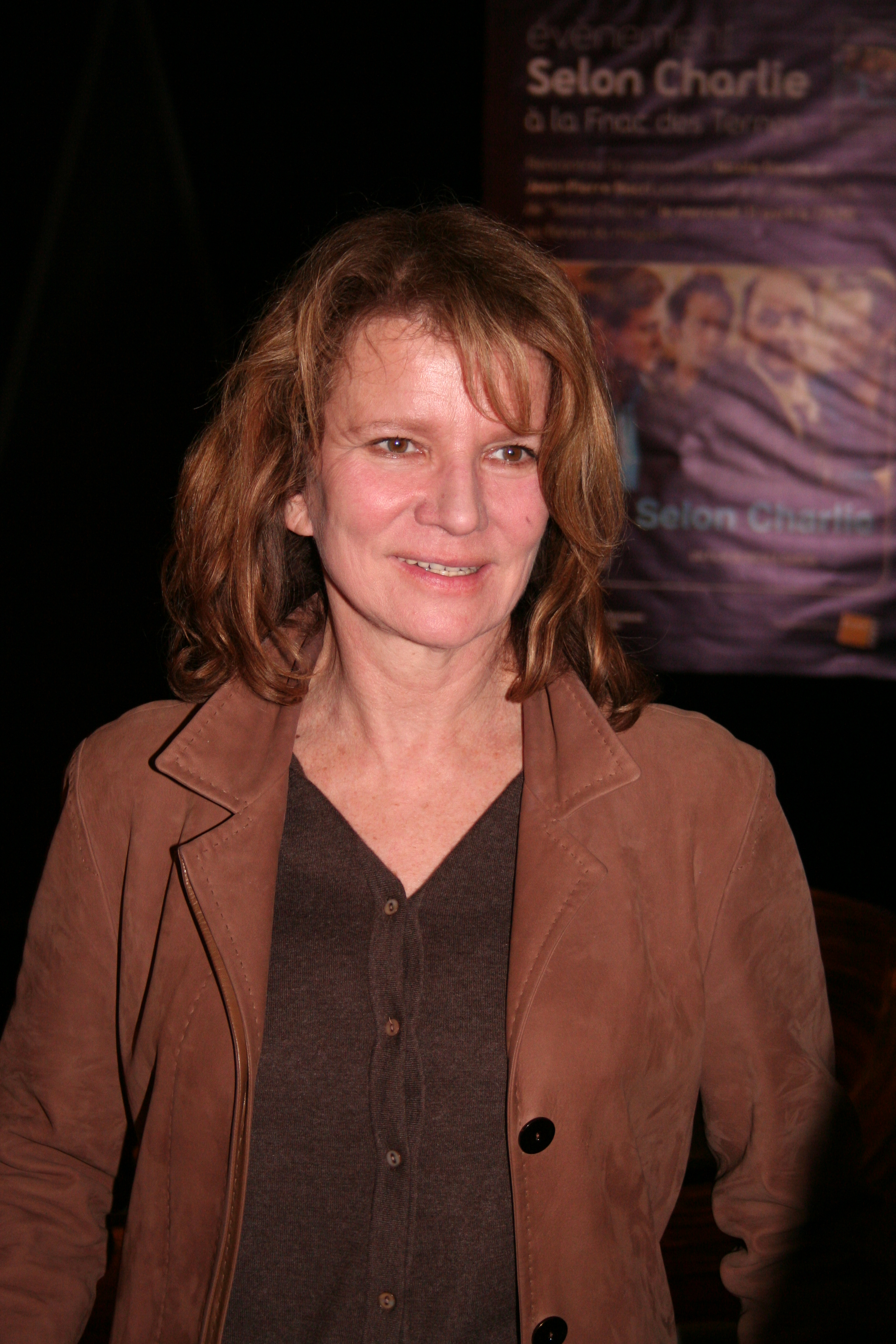
- Garcia in 2007
- Born: 22 April 1946 (age 80); Oran, French Algeria
- Occupations: Actress; film director; screenwriter
- Years active: 1967–present
- Children: 2; including Pierre Rochefort

Nicole Garcia (born 22 April 1946) is a French actress, film director and screenwriter. She won the César Award for Best Supporting Actress for her performance in the film Le Cavaleur (1979).

== Early life and education ==
Nicole Garcia was born on 22 April 1946 in Oran, French Algeria.

== Career ==
In 1980, Garcia won the César Award for Best Supporting Actress for her performance in the film Le Cavaleur (1979).

Her film Charlie Says (Selon Charlie) was entered into the 2006 Cannes Film Festival. Her film Going Away was screened in the Special Presentation section at the 2013 Toronto International Film Festival.

She was the president of the jury for the Caméra d'Or section of the 2014 Cannes Film Festival.

For her 2016 film From the Land of the Moon, Garcia was nominated for the 2017 César Awards for Best Film, Best Director, and Best Adaptation.

In October 2025, she started shooting her 10th film as a director, Milo, which marks her second collaboration with Marion Cotillard after From the Land of the Moon (2016).

== Personal life ==
Garcia's eldest son, Frédéric Bélier-Garcia, is a theatre director and writer. From her relationship with Jean Rochefort, she has a second son, the actor Pierre Rochefort.

== Filmography ==
=== As filmmaker ===
Year	English Title	Original Title	Notes
1986	15 août		Short film Nominated—1986 Cannes Film Festival – Short Film Palme d'Or
1990	Every Other Weekend	Un week-end sur deux	Nominated—César Award for Best First Feature Film
1994	The Favourite Son	Le Fils préféré	Avignon Film Festival - Prix SACD; Nominated—César Award for Best Film; Nominated—César Award for Best Director
1998	Place Vendôme		Nominated—César Award for Best Film; Nominated—César Award for Best Director; Nominated—César Award for Best Original Screenplay or Adaptation; Nominated—55th Venice International Film Festival – Golden Lion
2002	The Adversary	L'Adversaire	Nominated—2002 Cannes Film Festival – Palme d'Or
2006	Charlie Says	Selon Charlie	Nominated—2006 Cannes Film Festival – Palme d'Or
2010	A View of Love	Un balcon sur la mer	
2013	Going Away	Un beau dimanche	
2016	From the Land of the Moon	Mal de pierres	Nominated—2016 Cannes Film Festival – Palme d'Or; Nominated—César Award for Best Film; Nominated—César Award for Best Director; Nominated—César Award for Best Adaptation; Nominated—Globes de Cristal Award for Best Film
2020	Lovers	Amants	
2026	Milo	7:40 ce matin-là	Post-production

=== As actress ===
Year	Title	Role	Notes
1967	Hôtel Racine	Odile	Telefilm
1967	Boys and Girls	Coco	
1968	The Troops Get Married	A young girl	
1969	Léonce et Léna	Princess Léna	Telefilm
1970	Au théâtre ce soir	Françoise	TV series
1971	Madame êtes-vous libre ?	Monique	TV series
1971	Hot Pants		
1974	La Mort d'un enfant	Madame Grigny	Telefilm
1975	Let Joy Reign Supreme	La Fillon	
1976	Calmos	A lab employee	
1976	Duelle	Jeanne / Elsa	
1976	Body of My Enemy	Hélène Mauve	
1976	Les Enquêtes du commissaire Maigret	Dr. Steiner	TV series
1977	The Question	Agnès Charlegue	
1977	The Indians Are Still Far Away	Anna	
1978	Butterfly on the Shoulder	Sonia	
1978	Ce diable d'homme	Adrienne Lecouvreur	TV mini-series
1978	Aurélien	Blanchette	Telefilm
1978	Gaston Phoebus	Agnès de Navarre	TV mini-series
1979	Le Cavaleur	Marie-France	César Award for Best Supporting Actress
1979	The Bit Between the Teeth	Madame Le Guenn	
1979	Ogro	Karmele	
1980	My American Uncle	Janine Garnier	Nominated—César Award for Best Actress
1981	Le Grand Paysage d'Alexis Droeven	Elizabeth	
1981	Un jour sombre dans la vie de Marine	Moune	Telefilm
1981	Les Uns et les Autres	Anne Meyer	
1981	Beau-père	Martine	
1982	L'Apprentissage de la ville	Violette	Telefilm
1982	Qu'est-ce qui fait courir David ?	Anna	
1982	A Captain's Honor	Patricia Caron	
1983	Via degli specchi	Francesca	
1983	Copkiller	Lenore Carvo	
1983	Stella	Stella	
1983	Les Mots pour le dire	Marie	Nominated—César Award for Best Actress
1983	Waiter!	Claire	
1984	Les Capricieux	Diane	Telefilm
1984	Partenaires	Marion Wormser	
1985	Death in a French Garden	Julia Tombsthay	Nominated—César Award for Best Actress
1985	Le Quatrième Pouvoir	Catherine Carre	Montreal World Film Festival - Best Actress
1986	15 août		Short film Also as director and screenwriter
1986	A Man and a Woman: 20 Years Later	Herself	
1986	Mort un dimanche de pluie	Elaine Briand	
1986	State of Grace	Florence Vannier-Buchet	
1986	Mariage blanc	France	Telefilm
1988	La Lumière du lac	Carlotta	
1990	Overseas	Zon	
1991	Léon Morin, prêtre	Barny	Telefilm
1992	La Femme de l'amant	Cécile	Telefilm
1993	A Man at Sea	Fanny	Telefilm
1994	Aux petits bonheurs	Ariane	
1994	Jeanne	Jeanne	Telefilm
1995	Facteur VIII	Dr. Martine Bressian	Telefilm
1995	Runaways	Jeanne	
1997	Post Coitum		Voice
1999	Lost & Found	Mall Quartet Player	
1999	Kennedy et moi	Anna Polaris	
2001	Alias Betty	Margot Fisher	Montreal World Film Festival - Best Actress; Silver Hugo Award for Best Actress; Nominated—César Award for Best Supporting Actress
2001	Sa mère, la pute		Telefilm
2003	Tristan	Madame Driant	
2003	Little Lili	Mado Marceaux	
2003	The Story of Marie and Julien	Marie's friend	
2003	Hot House	Yvonne ("Sophie")	Telefilm
2004	Ne fais pas ça	Édith	
2004	Toi, vieux	Narrator (uncredited)	Short film
2004	The Last Day	Marie	
2006	My Last Role	Herself	Short film
2007	Ma place au soleil	Odile	
2007	Fear(s) of the Dark	Narrator	Voice
2007	Les Prédateurs	Eva Joly	Telefilm
2008	Madame		Short film
2008	God's Offices	Denise	
2009	Park Benches	The radio lady	
2009	Going South	The mother	
2011	Bachelor Days Are Over	Claude	
2012	One Night	Sylvie Loriot	
2012	A Greek Type of Problem	Jo	
2013	Gare du Nord	Mathilde Delaunay	
2014	Entre vents et marées	Joséphine de Kersaint-Gilly	Telefilm
2015	Families	Suzanne Varenne	
2019	Who You Think I Am	Dr. Catherine Bormans	
2021	UFOs	Valérie Delbrosse	TV series
2021	Lupin	Anne Pellegrini	TV series
2022	One Fine Morning	Françoise	
