= Rémi Bezançon =

French film director and screenwriter (born 1971)

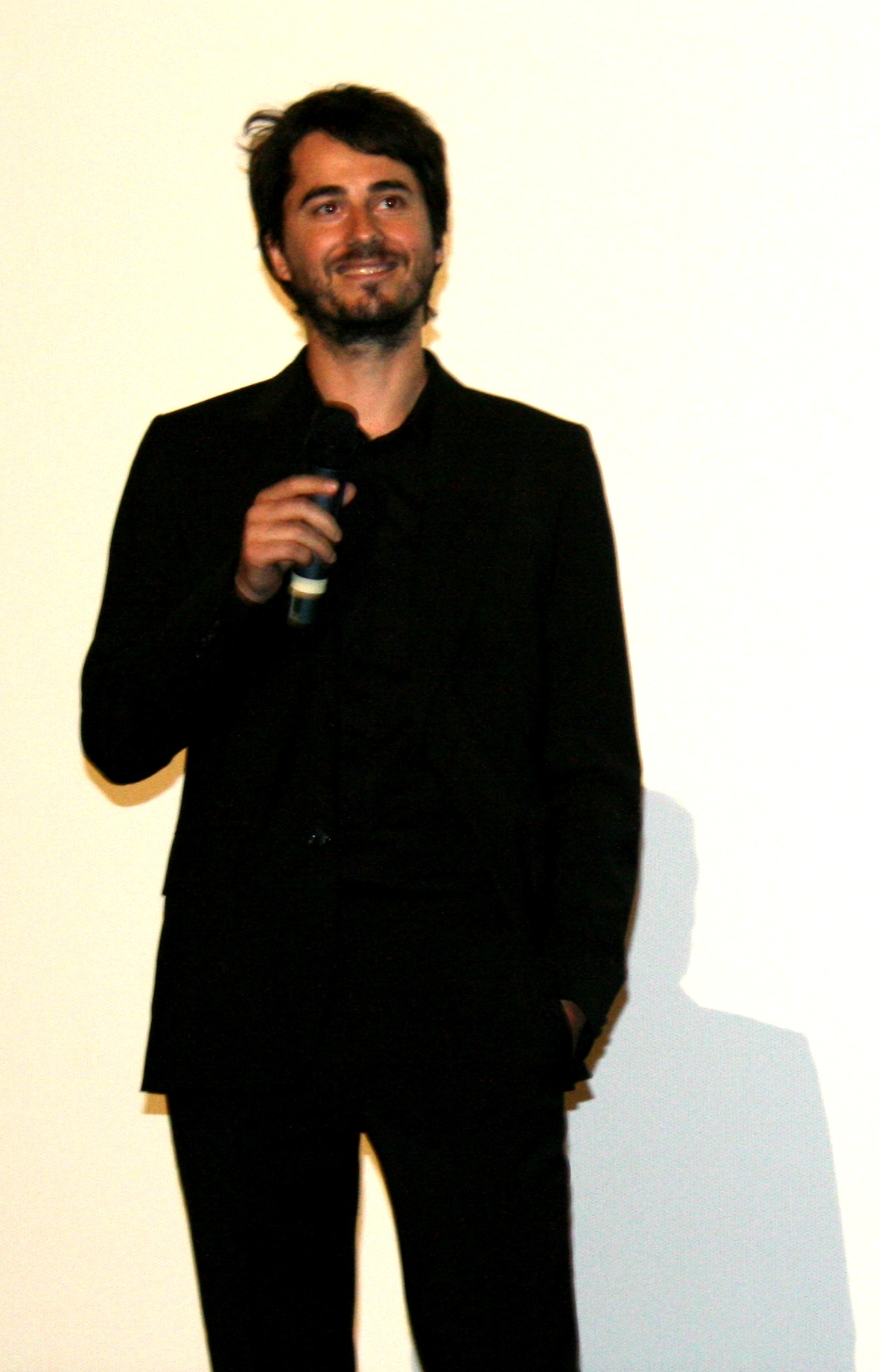
- Rémi Bezançon at the preview of Le Premier jour du reste de ta vie at UGC Ciné Cité Bercy, Paris, 21 July 2008
- Born: 25 March 1971 (age 55); Paris, France
- Occupations: Film Director, Screenwriter
- Years active: 1997–present

Rémi Bezançon (born 25 March 1971) is a French director and screenwriter.

== Biography ==
Rémi Bezançon grew up in Paris. Among other schools, he attended Lycée Montaigne (Paris) in the 6th arrondissement.

He studied at the École Supérieure de Réalisation Audiovisuelle (ESRA) in Paris and at the École du Louvre.

In 2005, his first feature film, Ma vie en l'air, was released. He achieved critical and commercial success in 2008 with Le Premier Jour du reste de ta vie. The film received nine César Awards nominations.

In 2011, he directed Un heureux événement, adapted from the novel by Éliette Abécassis, starring Louise Bourgoin, Pio Marmaï, and Josiane Balasko. The film's score, like that of his previous films, was composed by Sinclair (singer).

The following year, he released his first foray into animated film, the children's animal tale Zarafa (film), co-directed with Jean-Christophe Lie.

In late summer 2015, Our Futures, his fifth film, was released, marking his return to live-action filmmaking as well as his third collaboration with Pio Marmaï.

For his sixth film, the writer-director has thus completely broken away from his usual style. Together with Vanessa Portal, he adapted a novel by David Foenkinos. The Mystery of Henri Pick, released in March 2019, features Fabrice Luchini and Camille Cottin in the lead roles.

His seventh film, Un coup de maître, starring Vincent Macaigne and Bouli Lanners, was released on August 9, 2023. For this remake of the Argentine film of the same name, Bouli Lanners was nominated for Best Actor at the 2024 Magritte Awards.
