= Corinne Masiero =

French actress

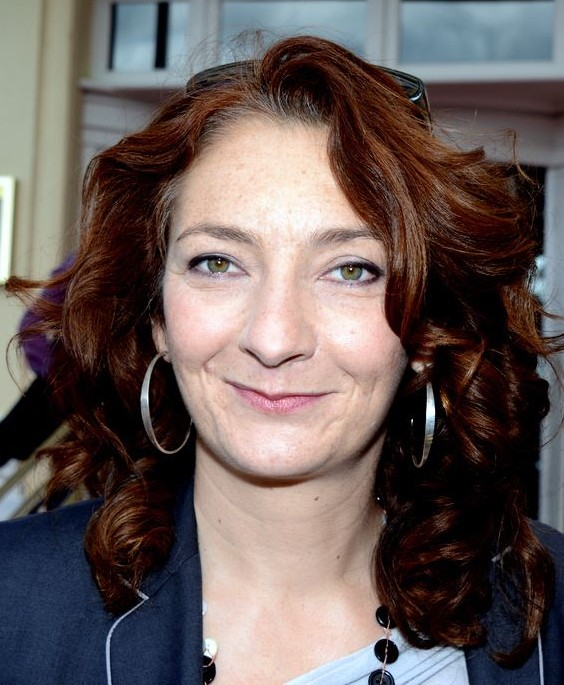
- Masiero in 2013
- Born: 3 February 1964 (age 62); Douai, France
- Occupation: Actress
- Years active: 1989–present

Corinne Masiero (born 3 February 1964) is a French actress. She began acting in her late 20s, initially appearing in the theatre before moving on to the screen. She is best known for her lead role in the 2012 film Louise Wimmer, for which she was nominated for the Cesar Award for best actress. She has also had notable roles in Rust and Bone, 11.6, and plays the lead role in Capitaine Marleau.

== Early life ==
Corinne Masiero was born on 3 February 1964 in Douai, France.

== Career ==
Masiero began acting relatively late in life. She also lived on the streets for a few years before discovering theatre. At the age of 28, after having worked at various odd jobs, she joined a theatre company. Her early roles were in comedies by Georges Feydeau and adaptations of Rainer Werner Fassbinder.

== Politics and activism ==
In 2014, during the municipal elections, Masiero ran on the Left Front slate in Roubaix.

She supported François Ruffin, for La France insoumise during the 2017 French legislative election.

At the 2021 César Awards, Masiero stripped naked in protest against the French government's plan of COVID-19 restrictions.

== Filmography ==
Year	Title	Role	Director	Notes
1998	The Dreamlife of Angels	Hollywood's woman	Erick Zonca	
2002	Qui mange quoi?	The nurse	Jean-Paul Lilienfeld	TV movie
2002	Alex Santana, négociateur	The seller	José Pinheiro	TV series (1 episode)
2003	Ambre a disparu	Véronique	Denys Granier-Deferre	TV movie
2004	Du côté de chez Marcel	Patou	Dominique Ladoge	TV movie
2004	Pierre et Jean	The Alcazar speaker	Daniel Janneau	TV movie
2004	Un petit garçon silencieux	Monique	Sarah Lévy	TV movie
2004	Juliette Lesage, médecine pour tous	Céline	Christian François	TV series (1 episode)
2005	Quelques mots d'amour	Fardienne	Thierry Binisti	TV movie
2006	Beau masque	Marguerite	Peter Kassovitz	TV movie
2006	La crim'	Sophie Daguerre	Eric Woreth	TV series (1 episode)
2006	P.J.	Éliane Contini	Gérard Vergez & Christophe Barbier	TV series (3 episodes)
2007	Surprise!	The TV woman	Fabrice Maruca	Short
2007	Le sang noir	Madame Marchandeau	Peter Kassovitz	TV movie
2007	Moi, Louis, enfant de la mine	Blanche	Thierry Binisti	TV movie
2007	Les oubliées		Hervé Hadmar	TV mini-series
2007	Chez Maupassant	The healer	Denis Malleval	TV series (1 episode)
2008	L'emmerdeur	Suzanne	Francis Veber	
2008	Clémentine	Woman in the wagon	Denys Granier-Deferre	TV movie
2008	Versailles, le rêve d'un roi	The mother of the deceased worker	Thierry Binisti	TV movie
2008	Baptêmes du feu	Conquete	Philippe Venault	TV movie
2008	L'affaire Bruay-en-Artois	Dominique Vals	Charlotte Brändström	TV movie
2008	Voici venir l'orage...	Goussarova	Nina Companeez	TV mini-series
2008-19	Collection Fred Vargas	Lieutenant Violette Retancourt	Josée Dayan	TV series (5 episodes)
2009	In the Beginning	Corinne	Xavier Giannoli	
2009	Persécution		Patrice Chéreau	
2009	Les Petits Meurtres d'Agatha Christie	Angélique	Eric Woreth	TV series (1 episode)
2010	Les Bougon	Ninon	Sam Karmann	TV series (2 episodes)
2010	Engrenages/Spiral	Patricia	Manuel Boursinhac & Jean-Marc Brondolo	TV series (5 episodes)
2010	Les vivants et les morts	Sylvie	Gérard Mordillat	TV series (8 episodes)
2011	Louise Wimmer	Louise Wimmer	Cyril Mennegun	Zurich Film Festival - Special Mention for her performance Cabourg Film Festival - Special Mention; Nominated - César Award for Best Actress; Nominated - Lumière Award for Best Actress
2011	La planque	Liliane	Akim Isker	
2011	Prochainement sur vos écrans	The realtor	Fabrice Maruca	Short
2011	Exhausted Renegade Elephant	Taxi Driver	Noëmie Nicolas	Short
2011	A.A.Lapieski	The nurse	Franck Renaud	Short
2011	La part des anges	Lola Hortez	Sylvain Monod	TV movie
2011	Celle que j'attendais	Suzon	Bernard Stora	TV movie
2011-16	Fais pas ci, fais pas ça	Aunt Solange	Laurent Dussaux, Cathy Verney & Philippe Lefebvre	TV series (4 episodes)
2012	Rust and Bone	Anna	Jacques Audiard	
2012	Ombline	Sonia	Stéphane Cazes	
2012	Corps solidaires	Catherine	Pascal Roy	Short
2012	Peter	Peter's mother	Nicolas Duval	Short
2012	Orphyr	Frodine	Jonathan Degrelle	Short
2012	Le sac	Pascale	Julien Jacques-Dara & Yohan Manca	Short
2012	Merlin	Ferrosa	Stéphane Kappes	TV mini-series
2012	Chambre 327	Simone	Benoît d'Aubert	TV mini-series
2013	Suzanne	Éliane	Katell Quillévéré	
2013	The Marchers	Dominique	Nabil Ben Yadir	
2013	Way Back Home	Hellboy	Bang Eun-jin	
2013	Lulu femme nue	The café's owner	Sólveig Anspach	
2013	11.6	Marion	Philippe Godeau	
2013	The Mark of the Angels – Miserere	Monique Mendez	Sylvain White	
2013	Queens of the Ring	Viviane	Jean-Marc Rudnicki	
2013	Vandal	The judge	Hélier Cisterne	
2013	La casse de M. Alfred	Woman	Jean Emmanuel Godart	Short
2013	Le clan des Lanzac	Suzanne Bernier	Josée Dayan	TV movie
2013	Indiscrétions	Felicidade Dhiniz	Josée Dayan	TV movie
2013	Les Délices du Monde	The mayor	Alain Gomis	TV movie
2014	Discount	Christiane Gendron	Louis-Julien Petit	
2014	Chat	Élisabeth	Philippe Lasry	Short
2014	Entre vents et marées	Captain Marleau	Josée Dayan	TV movie
2015	Courted	Marie-Jeanne Metzer	Christian Vincent	
2015	Simon	Laurence	Emmanuel Caussé & Eric Martin	
2015	Couple in a Hole	Celine	Tom Geens	
2015	Mollusques		Justine Pluvinage	Short
2015	The Last Panthers	The Judge	Johan Renck	TV mini-series
2015	Ainsi soient-ils	Zivka	Rodolphe Tissot	TV series (3 episodes)
2015	Hard	Sonia	Laurent Dussaux & Melissa Drigeard	TV series (10 episodes)
2015-23	Capitaine Marleau	Captain Marleau	Josée Dayan	TV series (16 episodes); Nominated - ACS Award for Best Actress (2017)
2016	Carole Matthieu	Christine Pastres	Louis-Julien Petit	
2016	Souffler plus fort que la mer	Louison	Marine Place	
2016	Hétérox	Endora	Maxime Pourbaix	Short
2016	La voix du père	Coco	Colas & Mathias Rifkiss	Short
2017	La consolation	Françoise	Cyril Mennegun	
2017	Je les aime tous	Solange	Guillaume Kozakiewiez	Short
2018	Vent du Nord	Véronique Lepoutre	Walid Mattar	
2019	Invisibles	Manu	Louis-Julien Petit	
2022	Good People	Cheffe de gare (English: "Station Master")	Stéphane Bergmans, Matthieu Donck, Benjamin d'Aoust	TV series (2 episodes)
