= Audrey Lamy =

French actress (born 1981)

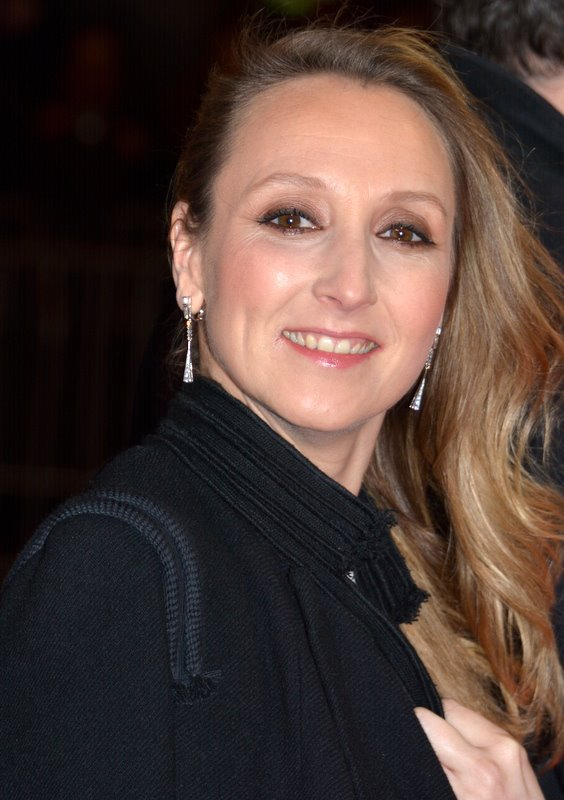
- Audrey Lamy in 2016
- Born: 19 January 1981 (age 45); Alès, Gard, France
- Occupation: Actress
- Years active: 2004–present
- Partner: Thomas Sabatier (2008–present)
- Children: 2
- Relatives: Alexandra Lamy (sister); François Lamy (cousin); Chloé Jouannet (niece)

Audrey Lamy (French pronunciation: [odʁe lami]; born 19 January 1981) is a French actress and humorist.

== Personal life ==
Audrey Lamy is the younger sister of fellow actress Alexandra Lamy and a cousin of politician François Lamy.

Since 2008, Lamy has been in a relationship with Thomas Sabatier, a French entrepreneur. Together, they have a son named Léo (born June 24, 2016) and a daughter (born summer 2021). In November 2019, she confirmed that she was expecting a child, although in February 2020 her entourage made it known that she had a miscarriage.

== Filmography ==
=== Feature films ===
Year	Title	Role	Director	Notes
2005	Au suivant !	An actress passing a test	Jeanne Biras	
2005	Brice de Nice	Woman in the bank	James Huth	
2008	Paris	Florist	Cédric Klapisch	
2010	Heartbreaker	The Cop	Pascal Chaumeil	
2010	Tout ce qui brille	Carole	Géraldine Nakache & Hervé Mimran	Nominated – César Award for Most Promising Actress; Nominated – Étoile d’Or for Most Promising Actress
2011	My Piece of the Pie	Josy	Cédric Klapisch	
2011	La Croisière	Samantha	Pascale Pouzadoux	
2011	Polisse	Disgraced mother	Maïwenn	
2011	The Adopted	Clémence	Mélanie Laurent	
2012	Plan de table	Marjorie	Christelle Raynal	
2012	Pauline détective	Jeanne	Marc Fitoussi	
2014	Beauty and the Beast	Anne	Christophe Gans	
2014	Memories	Director of the nursing home	Marc Fitoussi	
2015	Le Talent de mes amis	Cécile	Alex Lutz	
2015	Qui c'est les plus forts?	Céline	Charlotte de Turckheim	
2015	The New Adventures of Aladdin	Rababa / Barbara	Arthur Benzaquen	
2015	Dad in Training	Alice	Cyril Gelblat	
2017	Coexister	Sabrina	Fabrice Eboué	
2017	Simon et Théodore	Edith	Mikael Buch	
2018	Ma Reum	Fanny	Frédéric Quiring	
2019	Invisibles	Audrey Scapio	Louis-Julien Petit	
2019	Rebelles	Marilyn Santos	Allan Mauduit	
2022	La Brigade, or Kitchen Brigade	Cathy Marie	Louis-Julien Petit	
2023	Asterix & Obelix: The Middle Kingdom	Bonemine	Guillaume Canet	
2024	Lucky Winners	Louise Roussel	Romain Choay & Maxime Govare	

=== Television ===
Year	Title	Role	Director	Notes
2002	Un gars, une fille	The wife of Alex's boss	Isabelle Camus & Hélène Jacques	TV Series - Episode "Receive Alex's boss"
2004	Milady		Josée Dayan	TV movie
2008	Temps mort	Alex	James L. Frachon & Guy Giraud	Miniseries
2008	Palizzi		Jean Dujardin	TV Series - Season 2 Episode 43
2009-2018	Scènes de ménages	Marion	Alain Kappauf	TV Series; Grand Prix des séries 2012 for Best French actress
2013-2014	WorkinGirls	Stéphanie		TV Series - Seasons 2 & 3
2014	Ce soir je vais tuer l'assassin de mon fils	Christine Tessier	Pierre Aknine	TV movie
2021	La Vengeance au Triple Galop	Stephanie Harper	Alex Lutz & Arthur Sanigou	TV movie
2022	Désordres	Audrey	Florence Foresti	TV Series - Seasons 1 Episode 4 & 6
2023	Killer Coaster	Yvanne	Nikola Lange & Thomas Mansuy	TV Series - Seasons 1
2024	LOL : Qui rit, sort !	Self	Tristan Carné	TV Show - Seasons 4 Winner of the season

=== Dubbing ===
Year	Title	Role	Director	Notes
2006	Happily N'Ever After		Paul J. Bolger	French voice
2006	The Departed	Madolyn	Martin Scorsese	French voice
2012	Cendrillon au Far West	Melody	Pascal Hérold	
2013	Despicable Me 2	Lucy Wilde	Pierre Coffin & Chris Renaud	French voice
2014	Planes: Fire & Rescue	Lil' Dipper	Roberts Gannaway	French voice
2016	The Angry Birds Movie	Matilda	Clay Kaytis & Fergal Reilly	French voice
2017	Despicable Me 3	Lucy Wilde	Pierre Coffin & Kyle Balda	French voice
2024	Despicable Me 4	Lucy Wilde	Chris Renaud	French voice

== Theatre ==
Year	Title	Author	Director	Notes
2007	La Cagnotte	Eugène Labiche	Laurence Andreini	
2007	Meurtres de la princesse juive	Armando Llamas	Philippe Adrien	
2009-14	Dernières avant Vegas	Audrey Lamy	Alex Lutz	Globes de Cristal Award - Best one-man-show

== Awards and nominations ==
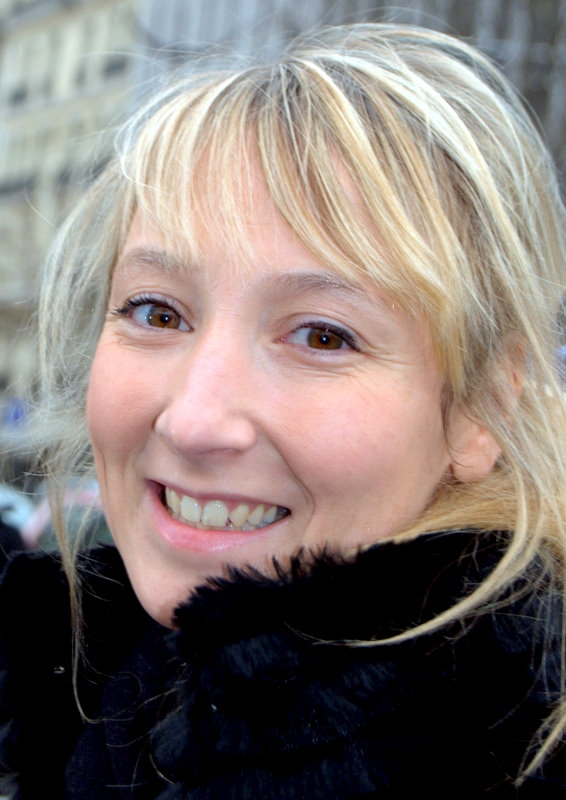
Audrey Lamy at the 36th César Awards in 2011

=== Étoile d’Or ===
Year	Nominated work	Category	Result
2011	Tout ce qui brille	Most Promising Actress|	Nominated

=== César Award ===
Year	Nominated work	Category	Result
2011	Tout ce qui brille	Most Promising Actress	Nominated

=== Globes de Cristal Awards ===
Year	Nominated work	Category	Result
2011	Dernière avant Vegas	Best one-man-show	Won

=== Molière Award ===
Year	Nominated work	Category	Result
2011	Dernière avant Vegas	Most Promising Young Female Talent	Nominated

=== Grand Prix des séries ===
Year	Nominated work	Category	Result
2012	Scènes de ménages	Best French actress	Won
