= Parisienne =

Parisienne or La Parisienne means a grammatically female person or thing from Paris, France. It may also refer to:

== Arts and entertainment ==
- La Parisienne (fresco), a fresco at the palace of Knossos
- La Parisienne (play), by Henry Becque (1885)
- "La Parisienne" (song), an 1830 song by Casimir Delavigne that served as the French national anthem during the July Monarchy
- La Parisienne (Hidalgo painting), an 1889 painting by Félix Resurrección Hidalgo
- La Parisienne (Renoir painting), an 1874 painting by Pierre-Auguste Renoir
- Une Parisienne, a 1957 film starring Brigitte Bardot
- Parisienne (film), a 2015 French film
- Parisienne Walkways, a song by Gary Moore

== Other uses ==
- Parisienne (cigarette), a Swiss brand
- Pontiac Parisienne, General Motors automobile models
- Société Parisienne, Belle Epoque manufacturer of automobiles
- Parisienne (perfume), a women's perfume produced by Yves Saint Laurent
- A walnut cultivar
