= Sarah Suco =

French actress (born 1981)

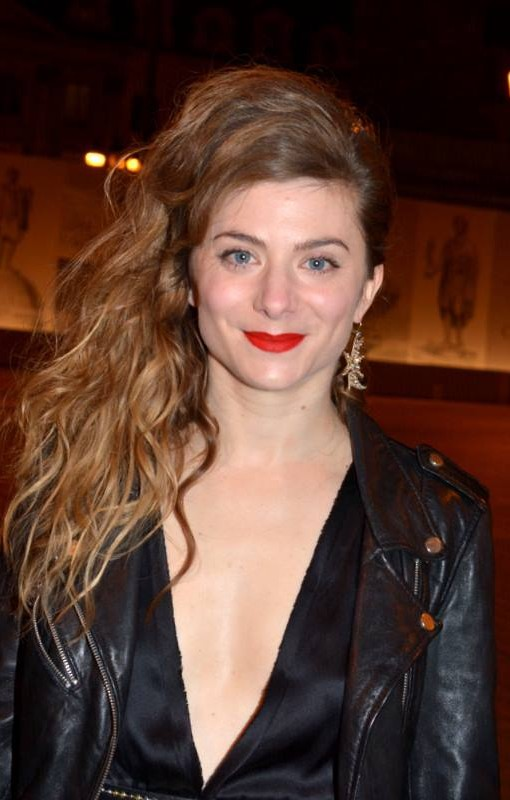
- Sarah Suco in 2016
- Born: April 1981 (age 45); Montpellier, France
- Occupation: Actress
- Years active: 2009–present

Sarah Suco (born in April 1981) is a French actress.

== Life ==
As a child, Sarah Suco spent ten years of her life in a charismatic religious community, until the age of eighteen, when she made the decision to leave her family.

At twenty years old, she entered the Conservatoire de Bordeaux. She joined the Compagnie Zébuline in 2010, specializing in shows for young audiences, then the troupe of Pierre Palmade, who encouraged her to write.

In 2019, she directed her first feature film, The Dazzled, about recruitment within sectarian communities, inspired by her own childhood.

== Filmography ==
=== Filmmaker ===
| Year | Title | Notes |
|---|---|---|
| 2017 | Nos enfants | Short |
| 2019 | The Dazzled | |

=== Actress ===
==== Cinema ====
| Year | Title | Role | Director | Notes |
|---|---|---|---|---|
| 2009 | Playgirl | The girl | Gilles Guerraz | Short |
| 2009 | Les figures | Claire | Louis-Julien Petit | Short |
| 2012 | Mes héros | The waitress | Éric Besnard | |
| 2012 | Possessions | The cashier | Éric Guirado | |
| 2013 | Demi-soeur | Too Much | Josiane Balasko | |
| 2013 | Anna et Otto | Anna 20's | Louis-Julien Petit | |
| 2013 | Les derniers hommes | Almeiria | Maxime Potherat | Short |
| 2014 | Goal of the Dead | The gruff woman | Thierry Poiraud & Benjamin Rocher | |
| 2015 | Discount | Emma | Louis-Julien Petit | |
| 2015 | Summertime | Fabienne | Catherine Corsini | |
| 2015 | The Clearstream Affair | The assistant | Vincent Garenq | |
| 2016 | Carole Matthieu | Anne | Louis-Julien Petit | |
| 2016 | Joséphine, Pregnant & Fabulous | Sophie | Marilou Berry | |
| 2017 | Orphan | The radiologist | Arnaud des Pallières | |
| 2017 | I Got Life! | Marina Tabort | Blandine Lenoir | |
| 2017 | Un nouveau départ | Alice | Michael Zazoun | Short |
| 2018 | Guy | Sara | Alex Lutz | |
| 2018 | Place publique | Samantha | Agnès Jaoui | |
| 2018 | Comme des garçons | Nicole Waquelin | Julien Hallard | |
| 2019 | Invisibles | Julie Carpentier | Louis-Julien Petit | |
| 2019 | Perfect Nanny | Diner's friend | Lucie Borleteau | |
| 2020 | Lucky | Julia | Olivier Van Hoofstadt | |
| 2020 | Motus | Alice | Elodie Wallace | Short |
| 2021 | The Speech | Karine | Laurent Tirard | |
| 2022 | La page blanche | Sonia | Murielle Magellan | |
| 2022 | L'école est à nous | Virginie Thévenot | Alexandre Castagnetti | |
| 2022 | En piste ! | Pauline | Emilie de Monsabert | Short |
| 2023 | Comme une louve | Pauline Clerc | Caroline Glorion | |
| 2023 | Veuillez nous excuser pour la gêne occasionnée | Ghislaine | Olivier Van Hoofstadt | |
| 2023 | Le Syndrome | Sophie | Zulma Rouge | Short |
| 2024 | The Marching Band | Sabrina | Emmanuel Courcol | |
| 2026 | Women on Trial (L'Affaire Marie-Claire) | Lucette | Lauriane Escaffre, Yvo Muller | |

==== Television ====
| Year | Title | Role | Director | Notes |
|---|---|---|---|---|
| 2012 | Le jour où tout a basculé | Celia | Thierry Esteves Pinto | TV series (1 episode) |
| 2016 | L'entreprise | Béa | Sébastien Deux | TV movie |
| 2020 | Call My Agent! | Justine | Antoine Garceau & Marc Fitoussi | TV series (4 episodes) |
| 2021 | Neuf meufs, l'unitaire | Anna | Emma de Caunes | TV movie |
| 2021 | Comme un coup de tonnerre | Suzanne | Catherine Klein | TV movie |
| 2022 | Clèves | Solange's mother | Rodolphe Tissot | TV movie |
| 2024 | Des blessures invisibles | Camille | Sarah Marx | TV movie |
| 2025 | Bénie soit Sixtine | Agnès | Sophie Reine | TV movie |
| TBA | Lucky Luke | | Benjamin Rocher | TV series Filming |
