= The Man in the Basement (film) =

2021 French drama film

- French: L'homme de la cave
- Directed by: Philippe Le Guay
- Written by: Marc Weitzmann; Philippe Le Guay; Gilles Taurand
- Produced by: Anne-Dominique Toussaint
- Starring: François Cluzet; Jérémie Renier; Bérénice Bejo
- Cinematography: Guillaume Deffontaines
- Music by: Bruno Coulais
- Release date: October 13, 2021
- Running time: 114 minutes
- Country: France
- Language: French
- Box office: $462.000

The Man in the Basement (French: L'homme de la cave) is a 2021 French thriller drama film written by Marc Weitzmann, Philippe Le Guay and Gilles Taurand, directed by LeGuay and starring François Cluzet, Jérémie Renier and Bérénice Bejo.

== Plot ==
A Jewish couple sell their house to a former history teacher, only to discover he was an anti-Semitic conspiracy theorist.

== Cast ==
- François Cluzet as Jacques Fonzic
- Jérémie Renier as Simon Sandberg
- Bérénice Bejo as Helene Sandberg
- Jonathan Zaccaï as David Sandberg
- Victoria Eber as Justine Sandberg
- Denise Chalem as Nelly Sandberg
- Patrick Descamps as Grandpa Gérard
- François-Éric Gendron as Attorney Massard
- Laëtitia Eïdo as Carole Vasquez
- Martine Chevallier as Attorney Rivière
- Patrick d'Assumçao as Monsieur Leroux

== Production ==
The film was shot in Paris.

== Release ==
The film was released in New York City on January 27, 2023.

== Reception ==
The film has a 77% rating on Rotten Tomatoes based on 13 reviews. Calan Panchoo of Film Threat rated the film a 6 out of 10. Glenn Kenny of RogerEbert.com awarded the film three stars.

Hannah Brown of The Jerusalem Post gave the film a positive review and wrote, "All the actors are good here, among them Renier, who starred in a number of films by the Dardenne brothers(...)But the movie really belongs to Cluzet and the vile character he portrays."

Gary Goldstein of the Los Angeles Times also gave the film a positive review, calling it "a gripping, smart and timely film that’s part thriller, part domestic drama and all cautionary tale."

Beatrice Loayza of The New York Times gave the film a negative review and wrote, "Somewhere in The Man in the Basement there is a smart psychodrama sharpened by political urgency, but what we get is a middling think piece that too quickly loses momentum — and peters out by the end."
