= David Chambille =

French cinematographer

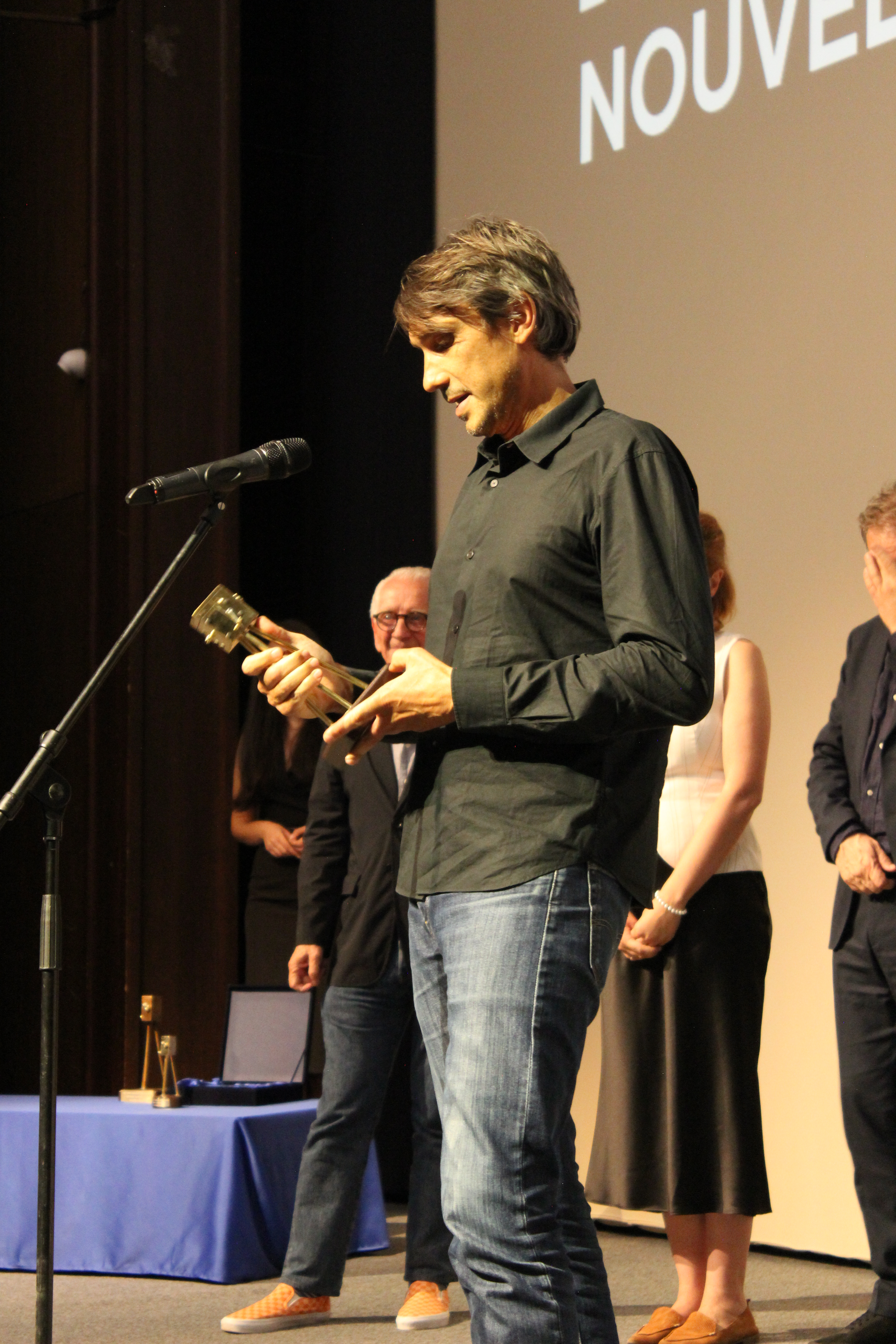
- Chambille at the 2025 Manaki Brothers Film Festival
- Education: École nationale supérieure Louis-Lumière
- Occupation: Cinematographer

David Chambille is a French cinematographer. He is known for his collaborations with Bruno Dumont, Stéphane Demoustier, Louis-Julien Petit and Gaël Morel. For his work on Richard Linklater's film Nouvelle Vague (2025), he won the César Award for Best Cinematography.

== Early life ==
Chambille studied at the École nationale supérieure Louis-Lumière and graduated in 2005.

== Career ==
Chambille has served as the director of photography on more than twenty feature films and also on short films and television series. He is a frequent collaborator of the directors Bruno Dumont, Stéphane Demoustier, Louis-Julien Petit and Gaël Morel. He has also served served as a camera operator on several films and series.

In 2019, he worked on Vers la bataille, directed by Aurélien Vernhes-Lermusiaux, which won the Louis Delluc Prize for Best First Film in 2021.

Chambille was selected by Richard Linklater to shoot his next film Nouvelle Vague after the two bonded over their shared passion and knowledge for the French New Wave movement, with Linklater saying, "We just were finishing each other's sentences with our ideas." Linklater had asked Chambille how well he knew the era and Chambille has said, "I personally love that era and know a great deal about its context – the lives of those directors, the economic and technical constraints and the style and aesthetics of the time". According to Chambille, Linklater's primary concern was to produce a film that "could have been shot during that period" and so they opted for "the kind of stock and lenses they had at the time and the texture of that moment". A black-and-white comedy-drama in the Academy ratio, Chambille shot the majority of Nouvelle Vague using digital camera technology. However, he also shot on film using Ilford HP5, Kodak 5222 stock and the ARRI 2C camera, though this was mostly during the test period, and during the shoot it was used as a reference for color grading rather than being used as actual footage. The film follows the production of Jean-Luc Godard's feature debut Breathless (1960). For his work on Nouvelle Vague, Chambille received the César Award for Best Cinematography on the occasion of the 51st César Awards. He also received a nomination for Lumière Award for Best Cinematography at the 31st Lumière Awards.

== Filmography ==
=== Feature film ===
| Year | Title | Director |
|---|---|---|
| 2008 | Arezki, l'insoumis | Djamel Bendeddouche |
| 2012 | The Girl from Nowhere | Jean-Claude Brisseau |
| 2014 | Discount | Louis-Julien Petit |
| 2014 | My Friend Victoria | Jean-Paul Civeyrac |
| 2016 | Fool Moon | Grégoire Leprince-Ringuet |
| 2016 | Carole Matthieu | Louis-Julien Petit |
| 2017 | Until the Birds Return | Karim Moussaoui |
| 2017 | Comment j'ai rencontré mon père | Maxime Motte |
| 2017 | Catch the Wind | Gaël Morel |
| 2018 | Invisibles | Louis-Julien Petit |
| 2018 | Bonhomme | Marion Vernoux |
| 2019 | Joan of Arc | Bruno Dumont |
| 2019 | Vers la bataille | Aurélien Vernhes-Lermusiaux |
| 2021 | France | Bruno Dumont |
| 2022 | Kitchen Brigade | Louis-Julien Petit |
| 2023 | Borgo | Stéphane Demoustier |
| 2024 | The Empire | Bruno Dumont |
| 2024 | To Live, to Die, to Live Again | Gaël Morel |
| 2025 | The Great Arch | Stéphane Demoustier |
| 2025 | Nouvelle Vague | Richard Linklater |
| 2026 | Le Triangle d'or | Hélène Rosselet-Ruiz |
| 2026 | La Chaleur | Stéphane Demoustier |

=== Television ===
TV movies

| Year | Title | Director |
|---|---|---|
| 2007 | La France Made in USA | Bob Swaim |
| 2018 | Le Temps des égarés | Virginie Sauveur |

TV series

| Year | Title | Director | Notes |
|---|---|---|---|
| 2007 | Infrarouge | Bob Swaim | Episode: "Lumières noires" |
| 2019–2020 | Laetitia | Jean-Xavier de Lestrade | 6 episodes |
| 2021–2022 | L'Opéra | Stéphane Demoustier, Cécile Ducrocq, Laïla Marrakchi, Inti Calfat, Dirk Verheye | 16 episodes |
| 2025 | Cimetière indien | Stéphane Demoustier | 4 episodes |

== Awards and nominations ==
| Award | Date of ceremony | Category | Film | Result | Ref. |
|---|---|---|---|---|---|
| César Awards | 26 February 2026 | Best Cinematography | Nouvelle Vague | Won | |
| Lumière Awards | 18 January 2026 | Best Cinematography | Nouvelle Vague | Nominated | |
| Manaki Brothers Film Festival | 26 September 2025 | Golden Camera 300 | Nouvelle Vague | Won | |
