= Philippe Berre =

French impostor and confidence trickster

- Born: 6 June 1954 (age 71); Paris, France
- Known for: various impersonations

Philippe Berre (born 6 June 1954 in Paris, France) is a French impostor and confidence trickster whose story inspired a 2009 movie In the Beginning by Xavier Giannoli, where Berre was interpreted by French actor François Cluzet.

== Impersonations ==
=== Construction engineer ===
For a month in 1997, Philippe Berre impersonated a civil engineer responsible for the construction of a segment of the A28 autoroute. He recruited personnel, rented material and mounted a construction site near Saint-Marceau, Sarthe; his team then started construction but he was eventually arrested after suspicions raised by one of the material suppliers.

=== Ministry of Agriculture official ===
In 2010, he impersonated an official of the French Ministry of Agriculture sent to Charron, Charente-Maritime in order to assist with relief efforts after the Xynthia windstorm. For four days, he signed contracts with various companies in the name of the ministry while keeping the fees for himself, he also rented material and had the mayor pay for it.

== See also ==
- Frank Abagnale
