= Marine Vacth =

French actress and model (born 1991)

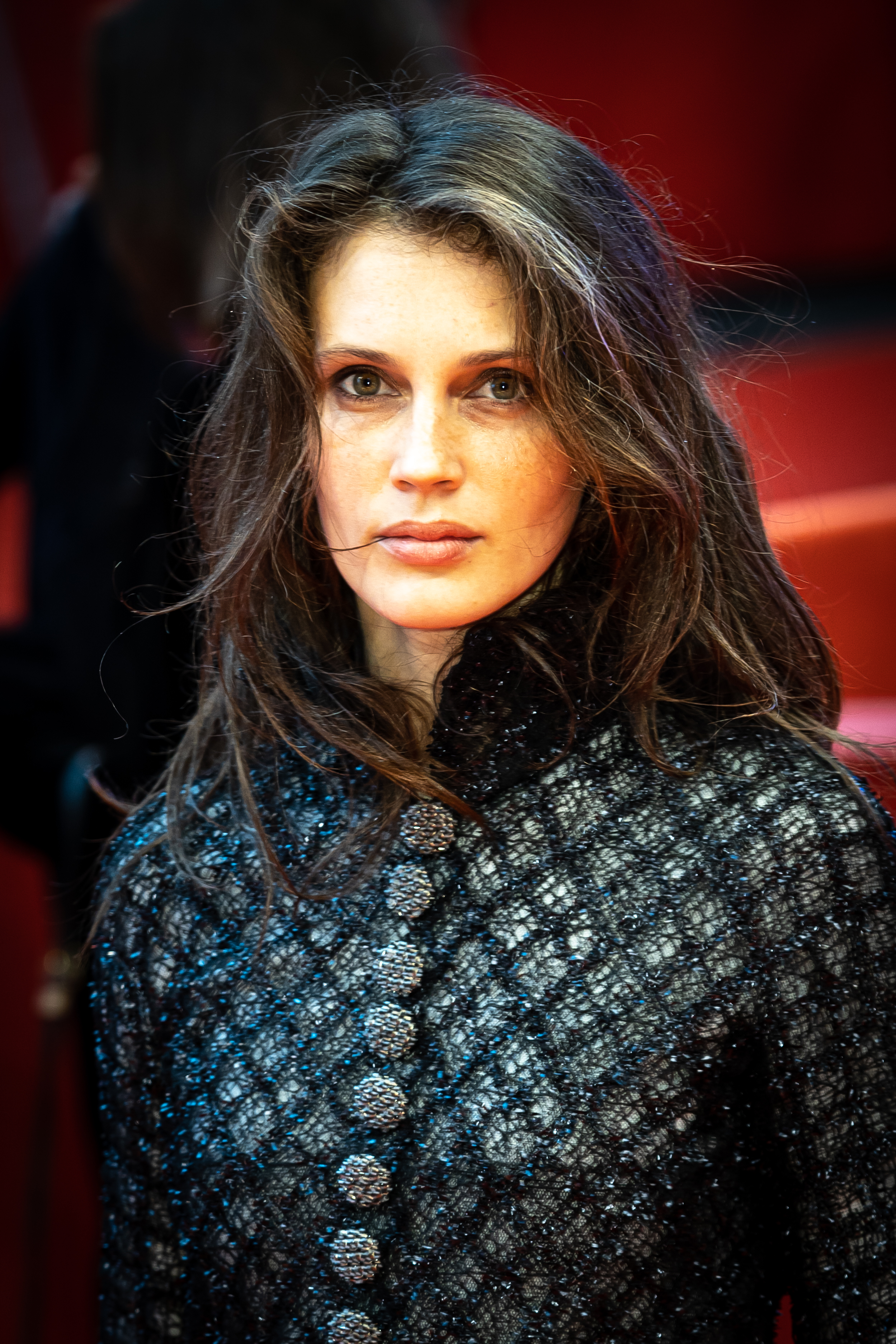
- Marine Vacth at the Berlin Film Festival 2020
- Born: 9 April 1991 (age 35); Paris, France
- Occupations: Actress, model
- Years active: 2011–present
- Height: 1.71 m (5 ft 7 1/2 in)
- Partner: Paul Schmidt
- Children: 1

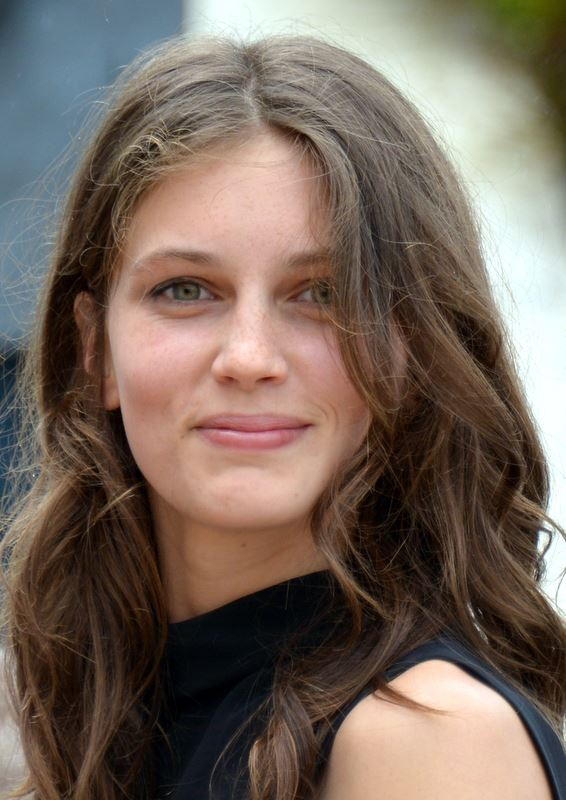
Vacth in 2013

Marine Vacth (born 9 April 1991) is a French actress and model.

== Life and career ==
Vacth was born on 9 April 1991 in the 12th arrondissement of Paris. She grew up in the Paris suburb of Maisons-Alfort. Her father is a truck driver and her mother an accountant. Her surname is of Lorrain origin.

She was educated at the Lycée Eugène Delacroix in Maisons-Alfort.

She practiced judo in her childhood, until she reached the brown belt.

Vacth began her modeling career at the age of fifteen after she was scouted in an H&M store. She notably became the advertising face of Yves Saint Laurent's perfume Parisienne, the French jeweller Chaumet, and the ready-to-wear brand Chloé. Although she worked in this field for several years, she later indicated that fashion did not align with her personal aspirations.

She started acting at twenty. She played "Tessa" in Cédric Klapisch's film My Piece of the Pie.

In 2011, she succeeded Kate Moss as the face for Yves Saint Laurent perfumes and the Chloé brand.

She is signed to Traffic Models.

She has worked with Leonardo DiCaprio for Oppo mobile and appeared in a music video for DJ Cam's "Swim".

== Personal life ==
As of 2014, she was living in Paris with her boyfriend, photographer Paul Schmidt, and their son Henri, born in that spring.

== Filmography ==
Year	Title	Role	Notes
2011	My Piece of the Pie	Tessa	
2012	L'homme à la cervelle d'or	Alice	
2012	What the Day Owes the Night	Isabelle Rucillio (adult)	
2013	Young & Beautiful	Isabelle	Nominated—César Award for Most Promising Actress; Nominated—Lumière Award for Best Female Revelation
2015	Belles familles	Louise	
2016	La Confession	Barny Debruycker	
2017	L'Amant double	Chloé	
2018	If You Saw His Heart		
2019	Pinocchio	The Fairy with Turquoise Hair (adult)	
2020	DNA	Lilah	
2020	Moloch	Louise	TV series
2022	On the Edge	Virginie	
2022	Masquerade	Margot	
2025	BADH (France) Agent Zero (US)	Alma Siracine (BADH)	Movie
