= À l'origine =

À l'origine may refer to:

- In the Beginning (2009 film)
- À l'origine by Benjamin Biolay
