= Heist of the Century =

Heist of the Century may refer to:

- The Heist of the Century, 1978 book by Ken Follett detailing a bank robbery by Albert Spaggiari
- Heist of the Century (album), 1998 album by American rapper La the Darkman
- The Heist of the Century (film), a 2020 Argentine comedy thriller film
- Jewel theft by Jack Roland Murphy in New York, 1964
- Antwerp diamond heist, in Belgium, 2003
- Armored van robbery by Toni Musulin in France, 2009
- Theft at Musée d'Art Moderne de Paris, in France, 2010
- Seth Rollins' Money in the Bank Cash in at Wrestlemania 31 for the WWE Championship

== See also ==
- List of bank robbers and robberies
- Crime of the century (disambiguation)
