= Mascarade =

Mascarade may refer to:

- Masquerade ball
- Mascarade, a 2013 board game designed by Bruno Faidutti
- Mascarade (film), a 2022 French comedy-drama
