= Pablo Pauly =

French actor

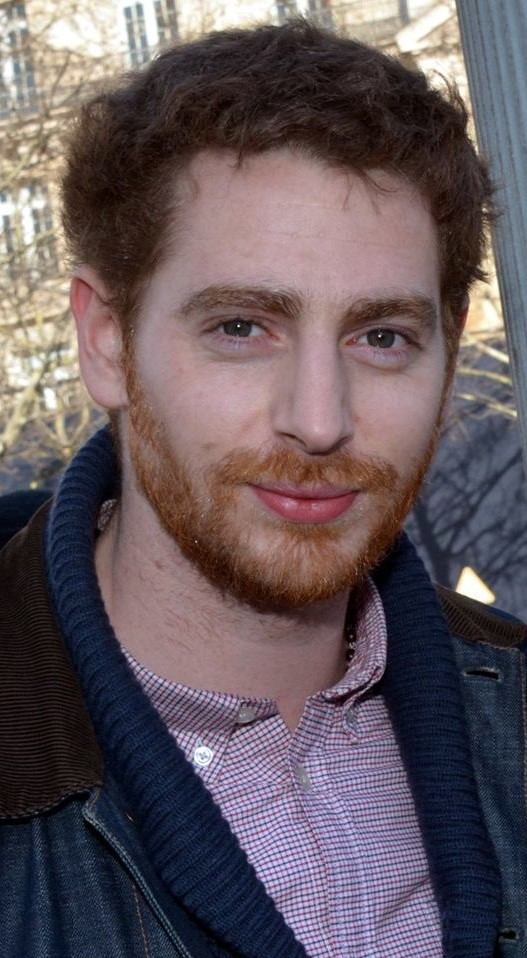
- Pauly in 2018
- Born: 24 January 1991 (age 35); Levallois-Perret, Hauts-de-Seine, France
- Occupation: Actor
- Years active: 2006–present

Pablo Pauly (born 24 January 1991) is a French actor.

== Theater ==
Year	Title	Author	Director
2006-2007	Zoo ou l'assassin Philanthrope	Vercors	Alain Jouani
2009	Mangeront-Ils	Victor Hugo	Pétronille de Saint-Rapt
2009-2010	Lorenzaccio	Alfred de Musset	Jean-Pierre Garnier
2009-2010	La coupe et les lèvres	Alfred de Musset	Jean-Pierre Garnier
2011	Nocturne	Florine Clap	Florine Clap
2011	Baby Doll	Tennessee Williams	Isabelle Duperey

== Filmography ==
Year	Title	Role	Director	Notes
2012	Mince alors!	The driver	Charlotte de Turckheim	
2012	Caïn	Jordan	Bertrand Arthuys	TV series (1 episode)
2012	En passant pécho	Quibron	Ken & Ryu	Web Series (2 episodes)
2012-14	Lascars	Polo	Tristan Aurouet & Barthélémy Grossmann	TV series (24 episodes)
2013	Fonzy	Pablo	Isabelle Doval	
2013	16 ans ou presque	Jahel	Tristan Séguéla	
2013	Le bureau des affaires sexistes	Florenchart	Tristan Aurouet	Web Series (23 episodes)
2014	The Finishers	Yohan	Nils Tavernier	
2014	Amour sur place ou à emporter	Julien	Amelle Chahbi	
2014	Papa Was Not a Rolling Stone	Robert	Sylvie Ohayon	
2014	Requiem pour mon père	The man	Quentin Perez	Short
2014	Les aoûtiens	André	Hugo Benamozig & Victor Rodenbach	Short
2015	Discount	Hervé	Louis-Julien Petit	
2015	Mobilisation		Quentin Perez	Short
2015	La tête de l'emploi	Rémi	Wilfried Méance	Short
2016	150 Milligrams	Charles-Joseph Oudin	Emmanuelle Bercot	
2016	Carole Matthieu	Cédric	Louis-Julien Petit	
2017	Patients	Ben	Grand Corps Malade & Mehdi Idir	Nominated - César Award for Most Promising Actor; Nominated - Lumière Award for Best Male Revelation
2017	Unleavened Bread	Rémi	Wilfried Méance	Short
2018	Marche ou crève	Sacha	Margaux Bonhomme	
2018	Vingt-cinq	Adrien	Bryan Marciano	TV series (12 episodes)
2019	Invisibles	Dimitri	Louis-Julien Petit	
2019	Blanche comme Neige	Clément	Anne Fontaine	
2019	Three Days and a Life	Antoine Courtin	Nicolas Boukhrief	
2019	Temps de chien	Victor	Edouard Deluc	
2021	The French Dispatch	Waiter	Wes Anderson	
2021	The Love Letter	Nino	Jérôme Bonnell	
2022	On sourit pour la photo	Antoine Hamelin	François Uzan	
2022	Murder Party	Théo Daguerre	Nicolas Pleskof	
2022	Three Nights a Week	Baptiste	Florent Gouëlou	
2022	Duos	Martin/Charlie	Marion Defer	Short
2022	Wilderness Therapy	Jonas	Edouard Deluc	
2022	Summer Frost	Joseph	Laetitia Masson	
2023	The Seed	William	Eloïse Lang	
2023	Borgo	Le brigadier	Stéphane Demoustier	
2023	À la joie	Sam Berthier	Jérôme Bonnell	TV Movie
2023	Garder ton nom	Jérôme Guérini	Vincent Duquesne	
2024	Maybe More	Alban	Olivier Ducray & Wilfried Méance	
2024	Jane Austen Wrecked My Life	Félix	Laura Piani	
2025	Studio Bagel	Andrea/Le mec	Enya Baroux & Martin Darondeau	TV series (1 episode)
2025	Montmartre	Youri	Louis Choquette	TV series (8 episodes)
2025	The Dreamers	Jacques	Isabelle Carré	
