= L'Amant double =

2017 film by François Ozon

- Theatrical release poster
- Directed by: François Ozon
- Screenplay by: François Ozon
- Based on: Lives of the Twins by Joyce Carol Oates
- Produced by: Éric Altmayer; Nicolas Altmayer
- Starring: Marine Vacth; Jérémie Renier; Jacqueline Bisset; Myriam Boyer; Dominique Reymond
- Cinematography: Manuel Dacosse
- Edited by: Laure Gardette
- Music by: Philippe Rombi
- Production companies: Mandarin Production; FOZ; Mars Films; Films Distribution; France 2 Cinéma; Scope Pictures
- Distributed by: Mars Distribution (France); September Films (Belgium)
- Release dates: 26 May 2017 (Cannes); 26 May 2017 (France); 14 June 2017 (Belgium)
- Running time: 110 minutes
- Countries: France; Belgium
- Language: French
- Budget: €7.1 million
- Box office: $5 million

L'Amant double (released in the United States as Double Lover) is a 2017 erotic thriller drama film written and directed by François Ozon, based on the 1987 novel Lives of the Twins (also known as Kindred Passions) by Joyce Carol Oates. It stars Marine Vacth as a young woman named Chloé who discovers that her lover is concealing a part of his identity.

== Plot ==
Chloé is a 25-year-old former model suffering from severe abdominal pain. After consulting a gynaecologist, she is told that her pain is psychosomatic and she needs to see a psychiatrist. She starts seeing Dr Paul Meyer, under whose care her condition improves. He later dismisses her as a patient because he has developed feelings for her, and the two enter into a relationship.

While unpacking their things after moving in together, Chloé finds out that Paul has changed his surname and hidden his family details from her. On her way home from work as a museum attendant, Chloé sees Paul's doppelgänger talking to another woman. She accuses Paul of lying to her as he was supposed to be at work at the hospital, but he denies that it was him. Not believing Paul, Chloé goes back to investigate and discovers that the other man is a psychiatrist named Louis Delord. She books a session with him under a pseudonym. In the first session, he is verbally abusive and she quickly leaves. The next time, they have violent sex and she continues to return for more.

It emerges that the sadistic Louis is the estranged identical twin of the gentle and passive Paul. Chloé begins to show signs of pregnancy and is unsure of who the father is, and Louis becomes increasingly possessive and cruel. Chloé investigates the dark reason for Paul and Louis' estrangement, visiting their former classmate Sandra.

Chloé confronts Louis and Paul, shooting one of them, but then collapses in pain. She is taken to the hospital and undergoes surgery. It is revealed that she was carrying her unborn sister, a parasitic twin, in her womb.

== Cast ==
- Marine Vacth as Chloé
- Jérémie Renier as Paul and Louis
- Jacqueline Bisset as Mrs. Schenker and Chloé's mother
- Myriam Boyer as Rose
- Dominique Reymond as Gynecologist and Agnès Wexler

== Release ==
The film was selected to compete for the Palme d'Or in the main competition section at the 2017 Cannes Film Festival. It had its world premiere at Cannes on 26 May 2017, with a simultaneous theatrical release in France on the same day.

=== Critical reception ===
L'Amant double received generally positive reviews from critics. On review aggregator Rotten Tomatoes, the film holds a 70% approval rating based on 105 reviews. The website's critics consensus reads, "Double Lover offers kinky pleasures that should thrill fans of classic erotic cinema while adding some uniquely transgressive European twists." On Metacritic, the film has a score of 70 out of 100 from 20 critics, indicating "generally favorable reviews".

=== Accolades ===
At the 8th Magritte Awards, the film received a nomination in the category of Best Actor for Renier.
