= Families (film) =

- Film poster
- Directed by: Jean-Paul Rappeneau
- Written by: Philippe Le Guay; Jean-Paul Rappeneau; Julien Rappeneau
- Produced by: Laurent Pétin; Michèle Pétin
- Starring: Mathieu Amalric; Marine Vacth; Gilles Lellouche; Nicole Garcia; Karin Viard; Guillaume de Tonquédec; André Dussollier; Gemma Chan
- Cinematography: Thierry Arbogast
- Edited by: Véronique Lange
- Music by: Martin Rappeneau
- Production company: ARP Sélection
- Distributed by: ARP Sélection
- Release dates: 25 August 2015 (Angoulême); 14 October 2015 (France)
- Running time: 113 minutes
- Country: France
- Language: French
- Budget: $11.6 million
- Box office: $3.4 million

Families (original title: Belles Familles) is a 2015 French comedy-drama film co-written and directed by Jean-Paul Rappeneau, his first directorial effort since 2003's Bon Voyage and his final one before his retirement and death in 2026. Filming began on 16 June 2014 in Blois. The film was released in theatres on 14 October 2015. It was shown in the Special Presentations section of the 2015 Toronto International Film Festival.

== Cast ==
- Mathieu Amalric as Jérôme Varenne
- Marine Vacth as Louise
- Gilles Lellouche as Grégoire Piaggi
- Nicole Garcia as Suzanne Varenne
- Karin Viard as Florence Deffe
- Guillaume de Tonquédec as Jean-Michel Varenne
- André Dussollier as Pierre Cotteret
- Gemma Chan as Chen-Lin
- Claude Perron as Fabienne
- Jean-Marie Winling as Vouriot
- Yves Jacques as Maître Ribain
