= Toni Musulin =

Serbian thief (born 1970)

- Тони Мусулин
- Born: 8 June 1970 (age 56); Saint-Martin-d'Hères, France
- Occupation: Security van driver
- Status: Released
- Criminal charge: Misappropriated Banque de France van
- Penalty: Three years in prison on 12 May 2010, extended to five years on 3 November 2010

Toni Musulin (Serbian Cyrillic: Тони Мусулин; born 8 June 1970) is a French man of Serb and Croat descent, and a former security van driver for the Loomis security firm. He is known for having stolen €11.6 million from the Banque de France while on duty.

Musulin became a hot topic of conversation on a social networking website, where he was praised for "the heist of the century" and for doing it without resorting to violence or guns.

== Early life ==
Toni Musulin was born in Saint-Martin-d'Hères on 8 June 1970 and grew up in Seynod with his brother and sister after his family moved there shortly after his birth. His father, Vinko Musulin, is an electrician who emigrated, when he was 22 years old, from Yugoslavia to France in 1965.

Toni Musulin's first career was as an electrician, like his father. At some point he founded a "société civile immobilière" (SCI Jacquemart) through which he bought an apartment building located 16 rue Jacquemart in Romans-sur-Isère in the Drôme department, with the ground floor being rented out as small shop.

At the end of the 1990s he became a security van driver for Loomis, for which he worked for 10 years, until the theft. His mother, also of Serbian origin, had by then divorced his father and was living in New Caledonia with her daughter Laurène.

Shortly before the theft, he emptied his bank accounts of an amount of €137,000, which was a significant amount for someone being paid €1,700 per month. Most of that money was in fact obtained through loans from multiple banks.

He was 39 years old when the theft occurred.

== Theft ==
On 5 November 2009, Musulin stole the armored van he was driving containing €11.6 million. This was made possible by lenient application of security procedures. The armored van was found empty shortly later with its GPS tracking device disabled. On 7 November 2009, the police were tipped off by witnesses and searched a garage in which they found most of the stolen cash: 9.1 million euros as well as a hired van. The remaining 2.5 million however could not be found. Musulin claimed that he left them in the van with the rest of the cash. At the time of the theft, he had emptied his flat and bank account.

== Surrender ==
Interpol searched for Musulin in its 185 member states, with suspicions he might have fled to Serbia. He finally surrendered himself to a police station in Monaco on 16 November 2009. His lawyer claimed that Musulin surrendered because "he is a responsible man, he committed an offense, not a crime, and decided to face his responsibilities". Police on the other hand believe that it was a planned surrender and that Musulin had no intention of cooperating. They believe that after his prison sentence, Musulin will be free to enjoy the remaining 2.5 million euros, which are still nowhere to be found.

According to French law, since the theft did not include any element of violence, the maximum prison term is only three years, with possible parole after 18 months. However, Musulin is also accused of false insurance claim. A few months prior to the van theft, Toni Musulin had declared that his red Ferrari F430 had been stolen, though in fact he had simply left it in Serbia.

== Trial and verdict ==
Musulin stated he stole in a rebellion against his boss citing bad working conditions and poor pay at the security firm. On 12 May 2010, a court in Lyon sentenced Musulin to three years in prison. On 3 November 2010, the sentence was extended to five years for the Ferrari F430 insurance fraud.

== Release ==
On 29 September 2013, after four years in jail, Musulin was released from prison.

== In movies ==
In 2013 a movie entitled 11.6 was released, based on the theft story, starring François Cluzet as Toni Musulin.
