= My Piece of the Pie =

- Film poster
- Directed by: Cédric Klapisch
- Written by: Cédric Klapisch
- Produced by: Bruno Levy
- Starring: Karin Viard; Gilles Lellouche
- Cinematography: Christophe Beaucarne
- Edited by: Francine Sandberg
- Distributed by: StudioCanal
- Release date: 16 March 2011
- Running time: 109 minutes
- Country: France
- Language: French
- Budget: $9 million
- Box office: $9.1 million

My Piece of the Pie (French: Ma part du gâteau) is a 2011 French comedy-drama film directed by Cédric Klapisch.

== Plot ==
Filmed after the 2008 financial crisis, and exploring themes of globalization, class distinctions and income inequality, the film opens in the French seaside town of Dunkirk. France (Karin Viard), a middle-aged divorcée, has just been laid off after 20 years at the same shipping company. She takes an overdose of pills but is rushed to hospital and makes a complete recovery. Desperate for employment to support her three children, she moves to Paris where she connects with Ahmed (Zinedine Soualem), the father of a former co-worker. France pretends to be a low-skilled immigrant to find menial work, but is then offered the chance to be the housekeeper for Stéphane Delarue (Gilles Lellouche), a wealthy French banker who has returned to Paris after 10 years in London.

The relationship between the pair is initially tense, but Stéphane eventually warms to France, especially after she proves herself an adept hand at taking care of his son for a month, an extra duty for which she is paid €200 a day. The relationship between France and Stéphane turns amorous on a trip to London to meet with partners of Stéphane's firm. But the following morning France reveals how she came to his employ: she had lost her job when her shipping company moved many of its jobs to China. Stéphane, recognizing the company's name, callously admits he was one of the bankers whose shorting of the company's stock hastened the job losses. Leaving the hotel to play in the park with Stéphane's son, France then overhears him boasting and laughing about his conquest the previous night. France abducts the boy and returns to Dunkirk, holing up in an auditorium that's hosting a dance performance. Stéphane arrives to see France arrested but the crowd, many of whom are former employees of the shipping company, are made aware of Stéphane's identity and pursue him onto the beach. The mob gives chase as others form a blockade to prevent the police wagon from taking France away.

== Cast ==
- Karin Viard as France
- Gilles Lellouche as Steve Delarue
- Lunis Sakji as Alban Delarue
- Audrey Lamy as Josy
- Jean-Pierre Martins as JP
- Zinedine Soualem as Ahmed
- Raphaële Godin as Mélody
- Marine Vacth as Tessa
- Tim Pigott-Smith as Mr. Brown
- Alex Lutz as Important man
- Philippe Lefebvre as Manager at the party
