= Serge Doubrovsky =

French writer (1928–2017)

- Born: 22 May 1928; Paris, France
- Died: 23 March 2017 (aged 88); Boulogne-Billancourt, France
- Education: École Normale Supérieure
- Occupations: Author, theorist
- Children: Renee, Cathy
- Relatives: Marc Weitzmann (cousin)

Julien Serge Doubrovsky (22 May 1928 – 23 March 2017) was a French writer and 1989 Prix Médicis winner for Le Livre brisé. He was also a critical theorist, and coined the term "autofiction" in the drafts for his novel Fils (1977).

== Early life ==
Julien Doubrovsky was born on 22 May 1928 in Paris. His father was a tailor and his mother was a secretary. His family was Jewish; in 1943, in the midst of World War II, they fled Le Vésinet and hid with a cousin.

Doubrovsky graduated from the École normale supérieure, and he earned the agrégation in English in 1949. He subsequently earned a PhD in French Literature.

== Career ==
Doubrovsky became a professor of French Literature at New York University in 1966. He subsequently taught at Harvard University, Smith College, and Brandeis University. He retired in 2010.

Along with publishing seven volumes of autobiography, he was known as a critical theorist. He coined the term 'autofiction', which has now entered the French dictionary.

== Death ==
Doubrovsky resided in the 16th arrondissement of Paris. He died on 23 March 2017 in Boulogne-Billancourt .

== Bibliography ==
- Le jour S, 1963.
- Corneille et la Dialectique du héros, 1963.
- Pourquoi la nouvelle critique : critique et objectivité, 1966.
- La Dispersion, 1969.
- La place de la madeleine : écriture et fantasme chez Proust, Mercure de France 1974.
- Fils, 1977.
- Parcours critique, 1980.
- Un amour de soi, 1982.
- La vie l'instant, 1985.
- Autobiographiques : de Corneille à Sartre, 1988.
- Le livre brisé, 1989.
- L'après-vivre 1994.
- Laissé pour conte, 1999.
- Parcours critique 2, 2006
- Un homme de passage, 2011.
