= Invisibles (2018 film) =

2018 film directed by Louis-Julien Petit

- Film poster
- French: Les Invisibles
- Directed by: Louis-Julien Petit
- Written by: Louis-Julien Petit; Marion Doussot
- Based on: Sur la route des invisibles by Claire Lajeunie
- Produced by: Liza Benguigui; Philippe Dupuis-Mendel
- Starring: Audrey Lamy; Corinne Masiero; Noémie Lvovsky; Déborah Lukumuena
- Cinematography: David Chambille
- Edited by: Nathan Delannoy; Antoine Vareille
- Music by: Laurent Perez Del Mar
- Production company: Elemiah
- Distributed by: Apollo Films
- Release dates: 22 August 2018 (Angoulême); 9 January 2019
- Running time: 102 minutes
- Country: France
- Language: French
- Budget: $4.8 million
- Box office: $18.9 million

Invisibles (French: Les Invisibles) is a 2018 French comedy-drama film directed by Louis-Julien Petit, based on the 2015 novel Sur la Route des Invisibles, Femmes Dans La Rue by Claire Lajeunie.

The film premiered at the 2018 Angoulême Francophone Film Festival and was released on 9 January 2019, to generally positive reviews.

== Plot ==
L'Envol, a day center for homeless women in Anzin, France, closes its doors: only 4% of the women who've been there have been reintegrated, which the city council considers to be insufficient. The civil workers decide to protest against these measures through civil disobedience and the secret installment of a therapeutic workshop and a sleeping hall in a squatter's home...

== Cast ==
- Audrey Lamy as Audrey Scapio
- Corinne Masiero as Manu
- Noémie Lvovsky as Hélène
- Déborah Lukumuena as Angélique
- Marianne Garcia as Marianne / 'Lady Di'
- Adolpha Van Meerhaeghe as Chantal
- Patricia Mouchon as Patricia / 'Edith Piaf'
- Khoukha Boukherbache as Khoukha / 'Marie-José Nat'
- Bérangère Toural as Bérangère / 'Simone Veil'
- Patricia Guery as Patricia / 'La Cicciolina'
- Marie-Christine Descheemaker as Marie-Christine / 'Brigitte Macron'
- Laetitia Grigy as Monique
- Fedoua Laafou as Fedoua / 'Salma Hayek'
- Stéphanie Brayer as Stéphanie / 'Françoise Hardy'
- Marie-Thérèse Boloke Kanda as Marie-Thérèse / 'Mimie Mathy'
- Aïcha Bangoura as Aïcha / 'Vanessa Paradis'
- Dominique Manet as Dominique / 'Brigitte Fontaine'
- Assia Menmadala as Assia / 'Dalida'
- Sarah Suco as Julie Carpentier
- Pablo Pauly as Dimitri
- Brigitte Sy as Béatrice
- Quentin Faure as Laurent
- Marie-Christine Orry as Catherine Paraire
- Fatsah Bouyahmed as Esteban
- Antoine Reinartz as Deputy mayor

== Release ==
The film had its world premiere at the Angoulême Francophone Film Festival on 22 August 2018 and was released in theaters on 9 January 2019.

== Reception ==
=== Box office ===
Invisibles grossed $0 in North America and $19 million worldwide.

=== Critical response ===
On French review aggregator AlloCiné, the film holds an average rating of 3.6 out of 5, based on 25 professional reviews.
