= Dad in Training =

- Theatrical release poster
- Tout pour être heureux
- Directed by: Cyril Gelblat
- Screenplay by: Cyril Gelblat
- Based on: Un coup à prendre by Xavier de Moulins
- Produced by: Laetitia Galitzine; Philippe Rousselet
- Starring: Manu Payet; Audrey Lamy; Aure Atika
- Cinematography: Pierre-Hugues Galien
- Edited by: Stéphan Couturier
- Production companies: Vendôme Production; Chapka Films
- Distributed by: Mars Films
- Release dates: 12 November 2015 (Sarlat); 13 April 2016 (France)
- Running time: 97 minutes
- Country: France
- Language: French
- Budget: €3.8 million
- Box office: $2.5 million

Dad in Training (original title: Tout pour être heureux) is a 2015 French comedy film written and directed by Cyril Gelblat, loosely based on the novel Un coup à prendre by Xavier de Moulins. The film stars Manu Payet, Audrey Lamy and Aure Atika.

== Cast ==
- Manu Payet as Antoine
- Audrey Lamy as Alice
- Aure Atika as Judith
- Pascal Demolon as Étienne
- Bruno Clairefond as Bébert
- Joe Bel as Angélique
- Rafaèle Gelblat as Rafèle
- Vanessa Guide as Eva
- Jaïa Caltagirone as Leonor
- Antoine de Caunes as himself
- Sophie Cattani as The mediator
- Alexis Michalik as Guillaume
- Anne Benoît (Scenes deleted)

== Accolades ==
Award / Film Festival	Category	Recipients and nominees	Result
Cabourg Film Festival	Swann d'Or for Best Actor	Manu Payet	Won
