= On the Edge (2022 film) =

- French: Entre la vie et la mort
- Directed by: Giordano Gederlini
- Starring: Antonio de la Torre; Marine Vacth; Olivier Gourmet
- Cinematography: Christophe Nuyens
- Edited by: Laurent Garnier
- Music by: Laurent Garnier
- Production companies: Frakas Productions; Eyeworks; Noodles Productions; Fasten Films
- Distributed by: Le Pacte (fr); O'Brother Distribution (be); Filmax (es)
- Release dates: 29 June 2022 (France); 13 July 2022 (Belgium); 14 July 2022 (Spain)
- Countries: Belgium; France; Spain
- Languages: French; Spanish

On the Edge (French: Entre la vie et la mort) is a 2022 Belgian-French-Spanish thriller film directed by Giordano Gederlini which stars Antonio de la Torre, Marine Vacth, and Olivier Gourmet.

== Plot ==
Leo is a Spaniard working as a metro driver in Brussels. He is witness to the death of an individual who jumped in front of a train, whom Leo identifies with his son Hugo. Leo embarks on a parallel investigation seeking to understand.

== Cast ==
- Antonio de la Torre as Leo Castañeda
- Marine Vacth as Virginie
- Olivier Gourmet as commissaire de police
- Fabrice Adde as Carl
- Nessbeal as Ben
- Tibo Vandenborre as Arsen
- Alexandre Bouyer as Ralph
- Lila Jonas as Malika
- Marie Papillon as Magali
- Noé Englebert as Hugo
- Christophe Seureau as François
- Vadiel Gonzalez Lardued as Farid
- Wim Willaert as Collègue métro

== Production ==
A joint co-production among companies from France, Belgium and Spain, the film was produced by Frakas Productions alongside Noodles Productions, Eyeworks and Fasten Films, with the participation of RTVE, Movistar Plus+ and support from ICEC and Eurimages.

== Release ==
Distributed by Le Pacte, it was set for a 29 June 2022 theatrical release date, whereas distributed by O'Brother Distribution, and Filmax, the film will open in, respectively, Belgian and Spanish theatres on 13 and 14 July 2022.

== Reception ==
Olivier Delcroix of Le Figaro wrote that Gederlini "signs an implacable thriller with the excellent Antonio de la Torre".

Raquel Hernández Luján of HobbyConsolas scored 75 out of 100 points ("good"), highlighting the performances, the cinematography, the soundtrack and the handling of the narrative tension as the best things about the film, whereas citing that the film "leaves a lot open to the viewer's interpretation" (with the finale requiring more explanation and development) as the worst feature about it.

== Accolades ==
Year	Award	Category	Nominee(s)	Result	Ref.
2023	2nd Carmen Awards	Best Actor	Antonio de la Torre	Nominated	

== See also ==
- List of French films of 2022
- List of Spanish films of 2022
