= Kitchen Brigade (film) =

2022 film directed by Louis-Julien Petit

Kitchen Brigade (or La Brigade)
- Theatrical release poster
- Directed by: Louis-Julien Petit
- Written by: Louis-Julien Petit; Liza Benguigui; Sophie Bensadoun
- Based on: an idea by by Sophie Bensadoun
- Produced by: Liza Benguigui
- Starring: Audrey Lamy; François Cluzet
- Cinematography: David Chambille
- Music by: Laurent Perez Del Mar
- Production companies: Odyssée Pictures; Apollo Films; France 3 Cinéma; Elemiah; Pictanovo; Charlie Films
- Distributed by: Apollo Films
- Release date: 20 January 2022
- Running time: 97 minutes
- Country: France
- Language: French
- Budget: €5 million
- Box office: $3.3 million

Kitchen Brigade (French: La Brigade), is a 2022 French comedy-drama film directed by Louis-Julien Petit.

The film premiered at the 2022 L'Alpe d'Huez Film Festival where it won the Prix d'intérpretation féminine (best female actor award), and it was released in theatres in France on 23 March 2022. It was released in 24 countries during 2022 and 2023, including in the United Kingdom in December 2022 and as a Samuel Goldwyn Films limited release in the U.S. in January 2023.

Its international (outside of France) revenues in six (five) countries in December 2022 (May 2023) alone were 150,055 euro (1,356,545 euro), and it then ranked 17th (15th) in admissions among French films.

== Plot ==
Cathy Marie, leaves her position as chef at a fancy restaurant, takes a position at the canteen of a shelter for immigrants, mostly African and South Asian youths likely to be deported at age 18. She introduces use of brigade de cuisine in the shelter's kitchen.

== Cast ==
- Audrey Lamy as Cathy Marie
- François Cluzet as Lorenzo Cardi
- Chantal Neuwirth as Sabine

== Reception ==
The New York Times described it as a "feel-good drama set in a hostel for undocumented minors – with a kick of cooking-competition-show excitement" and called it "a white-savior story par excellence, though at least it's not difficult to swallow – the young people are lovely, and so is the food."

Variety called it a "sweet, slightly undercooked diversion".

Quadratín México summarizes: "In a subtle way, the director Louis-Julien Petit manages to intertwine two apparently incompatible worlds: immigration and gastronomy, to raise awareness about the importance and complexity of these problems in just 97 minutes."

On the review aggregator website Rotten Tomatoes, 82% of 11 critics' reviews are positive.
