= Nouvelle Vague (2025 film) =

2025 film by Richard Linklater

- French theatrical release poster
- Directed by: Richard Linklater
- Written by: Holly Gent; Vincent Palmo
- Adaptation by: Michèle Halberstadt; Laetitia Masson
- Dialogue by: Michèle Halberstadt; Laetitia Masson
- Produced by: Michèle Pétin; Laurent Pétin
- Starring: Guillaume Marbeck; Zoey Deutch; Aubry Dullin
- Cinematography: David Chambille
- Edited by: Catherine Schwartz
- Production companies: ARP Sélection; Detour Filmproduction
- Distributed by: ARP Sélection (France); Netflix (United States)
- Release dates: 17 May 2025 (Cannes); 8 October 2025 (France); 31 October 2025 (United States)
- Running time: 106 minutes
- Countries: France; United States
- Languages: French; English
- Budget: $9.9 million
- Box office: $2.5 million

Nouvelle Vague is a 2025 comedy-drama film directed by Richard Linklater. Starring Guillaume Marbeck as Jean-Luc Godard, Zoey Deutch as Jean Seberg, and Aubry Dullin as Jean-Paul Belmondo, it follows the shooting of Breathless (1960), one of the first feature films of the French New Wave of cinema.

Nouvelle Vague had its premiere at the 2025 Cannes Film Festival on 17 May 2025. It was theatrically released in France by ARP Sélection on 8 October and received a limited theatrical release in the United States on 31 October, before streaming on Netflix on 14 November.

At the 51st César Awards, Linklater became the second American filmmaker to win Best Director. The film was also nominated for Best Motion Picture – Musical or Comedy at the 83rd Golden Globe Awards, while Deutch was nominated for Best Supporting Performance at the 41st Independent Spirit Awards.

== Plot ==
In 1959, Jean-Luc Godard, François Truffaut and Claude Chabrol—film critics for Cahiers du Cinéma—along with Suzanne Schiffman attend the film premiere of La Passe du diable, produced by Georges de Beauregard. At the afterparty, Godard harshly criticizes the film and pledges to become a film director, as his other colleagues have. Godard attends the Cannes Film Festival where Truffaut's film The 400 Blows becomes a resounding success, paving the way for aspiring young filmmakers.

Godard decides to direct a film based on Truffaut's short outline, inspired by Michel Portail, a petty criminal who had stolen a car, and his American journalist girlfriend Beverly Lynette. Meanwhile, Godard casts Jean-Paul Belmondo, who has completed his military service, for the lead role as Michel Poiccard. Back at the office of Cahiers du Cinéma, Italian director Roberto Rossellini encourages the staff to avoid artistic artifice and shoot efficiently.

Godard hires Pierre Rissient as the film's assistant director, and receives advice from Jean-Pierre Melville. Elsewhere, Jean Seberg promotes her latest film Bonjour Tristesse. Godard meets with Seberg through her husband François Moreuil, and decides to cast her as Patricia. Godard next hires cameraman Raoul Coutard and expresses his creative vision, desiring a guerilla filmmaking style and to shoot in the Academy ratio.

On the first day of production, Godard films only a single scene. As production continues, Godard's continual script rewrites, continued emphasis on spontaneity, disregard for continuity, and the exceptionally short shooting days bewilders the cast and crew members. As Godard shoots scenes between her and Belmondo, Seberg becomes frustrated by Godard's directorial style and briefly considers leaving the production. Belmondo is told his career will be ruined.

After a week of filming, Godard converses with Truffaut and Schiffman over drinks, where he is eager to cast Truffaut as an informant in the film. By the second week, Godard phones Coutard that he has suspended filming for the day, claiming he is not feeling well. Shortly after, Beauregard confronts Godard, angered that production has fallen behind schedule and threatens to cancel the film. Under pressure, Godard expedites the production and films further scenes between Seberg and Belmondo.

During the middle of the second week, Godard casts himself as the informant after Truffaut has declined the role. He subsequently films a cameo of Jean-Pierre Melville near an airport. Later, Godard films the scene where Belmondo's character dies on the street. He and Seberg have a brief disagreement when Godard wants Seberg's character Patricia to search through the dying Michel's pockets, but Seberg refuses to play the scene that way. Instead, Seberg's Patricia questions what "dégueulasse" (disgusting) means. When Seberg finishes her last scene, she is relieved and heads back to Hollywood to film her next film, Let No Man Write My Epitaph. After 23 days of filming, Godard wraps the production.

During post-production, Godard urges editor Cécile Decugis to make jump cuts, much to her disagreement. Godard then screens his film Breathless for Truffaut, Chabrol, Schiffman, and Beauregard who ironically say the film is terrible before giving Godard a round of applause. An epilogue states that Breathless became one of the most influential films ever made, Belmondo became an international star, and Seberg divorced her husband, appeared in 35 films, and died at the age of 40. Godard's filmmaking career continued for more than 60 years.

At various points, the film employs tableaux to identify and pay tribute to notable figures of the period, including filmmakers, critics, and regular contributors to Cahiers du Cinéma.

== Cast ==
- Guillaume Marbeck as Jean-Luc Godard
- Zoey Deutch as Jean Seberg
- Aubry Dullin as Jean-Paul Belmondo
- Bruno Dreyfürst as Georges de Beauregard
- Benjamin Clery as Pierre Rissient
- Matthieu Penchinat as Raoul Coutard
- Pauline Belle as Suzon Faye
- Blaise Pettebone as Marc Pierret
- Benoît Bouthors as Claude Beausoleil
- Paolo Luka Noé as François Moreuil, Seberg's husband
- Adrien Rouyard as François Truffaut
- Jade Phan-Gia as Phuong Maittret
- Jodie Ruth-Forest as Suzanne Schiffman
- Antoine Besson as Claude Chabrol
- Franck Cicurel as Raymond Cauchetier
- Roxane Rivière as Agnès Varda
- Jean-Jacques Le Vessier as Jean Cocteau
- Côme Thieulin as Éric Rohmer
- Laurent Mothe as Roberto Rossellini
- Jonas Marmy as Jacques Rivette
- Niko Ravel as Michel Fabre

== Production ==
In October 2023, Linklater revealed his plans to shoot a film in France about the French New Wave movement. The original script was written by Holly Gent and Vincent Palmo, Jr., and then it was translated to French with dialogue by Michèle Halberstadt and Laetitia Masson.

The film is Linklater's first project shot entirely in French, and it was shot by David Chambille in black and white on 35 mm film, using the Academy ratio (1.37:1). In post-production, digital grain, gate weave, and fine scratches were added to evoke the patina of a well-worn archival print.

Filming began in Paris on 4 March 2024, and concluded in April 2024. The film received an avance sur recettes (advance on takings) grant of France's Centre national du cinéma et de l'image animée (CNC).

== Release ==
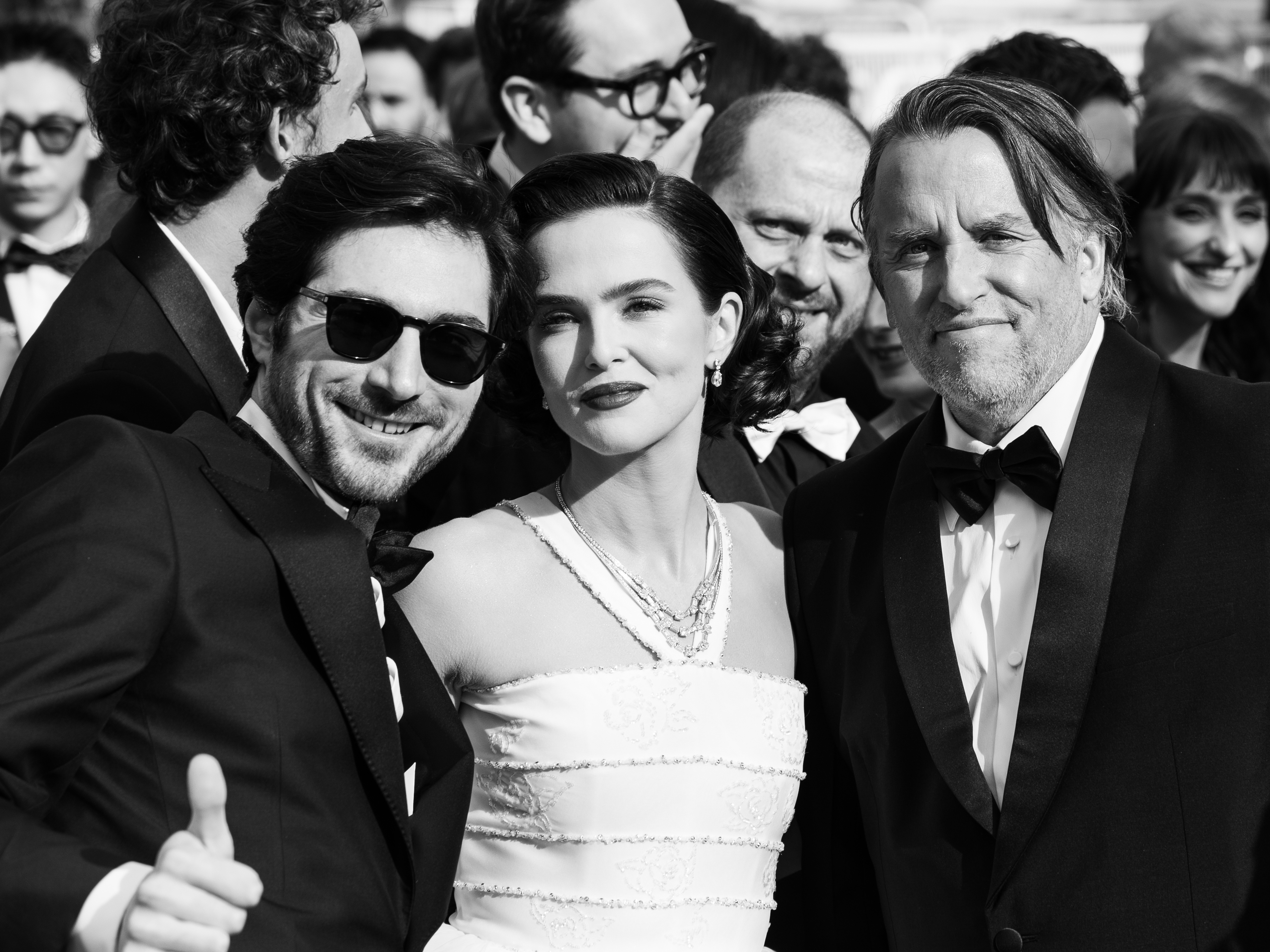
Guillaume Marbeck, Zoey Deutch and Richard Linklater during the film's premiere at the 2025 Cannes Film Festival

In April 2025, Nouvelle Vague was selected to compete for the Palme d'Or at the 2025 Cannes Film Festival, where it had its world premiere on 17 May 2025 and received an 11-minute standing ovation.

Following its Cannes premiere, Netflix bought U.S. distribution rights for $4 million after a heated bidding war; this sum is believed to be the second highest ever paid for a domestic deal for a foreign language film only behind Emilia Pérez, also purchased at Cannes by Netflix. While release plans were not disclosed, the film was expected to be in theaters for only two weeks in an awards-qualifying run before streaming on Netflix.

It was also screened in the Best of 2025 section of the 20th Rome Film Festival and as a Headline Gala at the 69th BFI London Film Festival.

It was theatrically released in France by ARP Sélection on 8 October 2025. In the United States, it was released in select theaters on 31 October 2025, before streaming on Netflix on 14 November.

== Reception ==
On the review aggregator website Rotten Tomatoes, 92% of 193 critics' reviews are positive, with an average rating of 7.6/10. The website's critics consensus reads, "Seamlessly recreating one of cinema's most groundbreaking productions, Nouvelle Vague doesn't reinvent the medium the way its subjects did, but it pays tribute to their accomplishment with infectious admiration." Metacritic, which uses a weighted average, assigned the film a score of 76 out of 100, based on 42 critics, indicating "generally favorable" reviews.

Lee Marshall of ScreenDaily described the film as "a nostalgic tribute to a time and place of extraordinary creative ferment".

=== Accolades ===
Award	Date of ceremony	Category	Recipient(s)	Result	Ref.
Cannes Film Festival	24 May 2025	Palme d'Or	Richard Linklater	Nominated	
Gotham Independent Film Awards	1 December 2025	Best International Feature	Laurent Pétin and Michèle Pétin	Nominated	
Golden Globe Awards	11 January 2026	Best Motion Picture – Musical or Comedy	Nouvelle Vague	Nominated	
Savannah Film Festival	1 November 2025	Breakthrough Performance Award	Zoey Deutch	Won	
Lumière Awards	18 January 2026	Best Film	Nouvelle Vague	Nominated	
Lumière Awards	18 January 2026	Best Director	Richard Linklater	Won	
Lumière Awards	18 January 2026	Best Male Revelation	Guillaume Marbeck	Won	
Lumière Awards	18 January 2026	Best Screenplay	Holly Gent, Vince Palmo and Michèle Halberstadt	Nominated	
Lumière Awards	18 January 2026	Best Cinematography	David Chambille	Nominated	
Film Independent Spirit Awards	15 February 2026	Best Supporting Performance	Zoey Deutch	Nominated	
César Awards	26 February 2026	Best Film	Nouvelle Vague	Nominated	
César Awards	26 February 2026	Best Director	Richard Linklater	Won	
César Awards	26 February 2026	Best Male Revelation	Guillaume Marbeck	Nominated	
César Awards	26 February 2026	Best Original Screenplay	Holly Gent and Vince Palmo	Nominated	
César Awards	26 February 2026	Best Cinematography	David Chambille	Won	
César Awards	26 February 2026	Best Editing	Catherine Schwartz	Won	
César Awards	26 February 2026	Best Sound	Jean minondo, Serge Rouquairol and Christophe Vingtrinier	Nominated	
César Awards	26 February 2026	Best Costume Design	Pascaline Chavanne	Won	
César Awards	26 February 2026	Best Production Design	Katia Wyszkop	Nominated	
César Awards	26 February 2026	Best Visual Effects	Alain Carsoux	Nominated	
