= Carole Matthieu =

2016 film directed by Louis-Julien Petit

- Directed by: Louis-Julien Petit
- Written by: Louis-Julien Petit; Fanny Burdino; Samuel Doux
- Based on: Les visages écrasés by Marin Ledun
- Produced by: Liza Benguigui; Marc Ladreit de Lacharrière; Philippe Dupuis-Mendel
- Starring: Isabelle Adjani
- Cinematography: David Chambille
- Edited by: Nathan Delannoy; Antoine Vareille
- Music by: Laurent Perez Del Mar
- Production companies: Elemiah; Luminescence Film
- Distributed by: Paradis Films
- Release date: 7 December 2016
- Running time: 86 minutes
- Country: France
- Language: French

Carole Matthieu is a 2016 French drama film directed by Louis-Julien Petit.

== Cast ==
- Isabelle Adjani : Carole Matthieu
- Corinne Masiero : Christine Pastres
- Lyes Salem : Alain
- Ola Rapace : Revel
- Pablo Pauly : Cédric
- Arnaud Viard : Jean-Paul
- Sarah Suco : Anne
- Marie-Christine Orry : Sarah
- Sébastien Chassagne : Louis Parrat
- Alexandre Carrière : Vincent Fournier
- Patricia Pekmezian : Anne-Marie
- Christian Joubert : Patrick
- Vincent Duquesne : Eric
