= Louise Wimmer =

- Theatrical release poster
- Directed by: Cyril Mennegun
- Written by: Cyril Mennegun; Anne-Louise Trividic (collaboration)
- Produced by: Bruno Nahon
- Starring: Corinne Masiero
- Cinematography: Thomas Letellier
- Distributed by: Haut et Court
- Release dates: 5 September 2011 (VIFF); 4 January 2012 (France)
- Running time: 80 minutes
- Country: France
- Language: French
- Budget: $2.1 million
- Box office: $1.2 million

Louise Wimmer is a 2011 French drama film directed by Cyril Mennegun.

== Plot ==
Louise Wimmer barely scrapes a living and has to resort to living in her constantly malfunctioning car. Eventually an efficient social security officer jump starts her life with the prospect of a new home.

== Cast ==
- Corinne Masiero as Louise Wimmer
- Jérôme Kircher as Didier
- Anne Benoit as Nicole
- Marie Kremer as Séverine
- Jean-Marc Roulot as Paul
- Frédéric Gorny as hotel manager
- Maud Wyler as Jessica Wimmer

== Accolades ==
Award / Film Festival	Category	Recipients and nominees	Result
Cabourg Film Festival	Coup de Cœur	Corinne Masiero	Won
César Awards	Best Actress	Corinne Masiero	Nominated
César Awards	Best First Feature Film		Won
French Syndicate of Cinema Critics	Best First Film		Won
Lumière Awards	Best Director	Cyril Mennegun	Nominated
Lumière Awards	Best Actress	Corinne Masiero	Nominated
Louis Delluc Prize	Best First Film		Won
