= Cookie Kunty =

Canadian drag performer

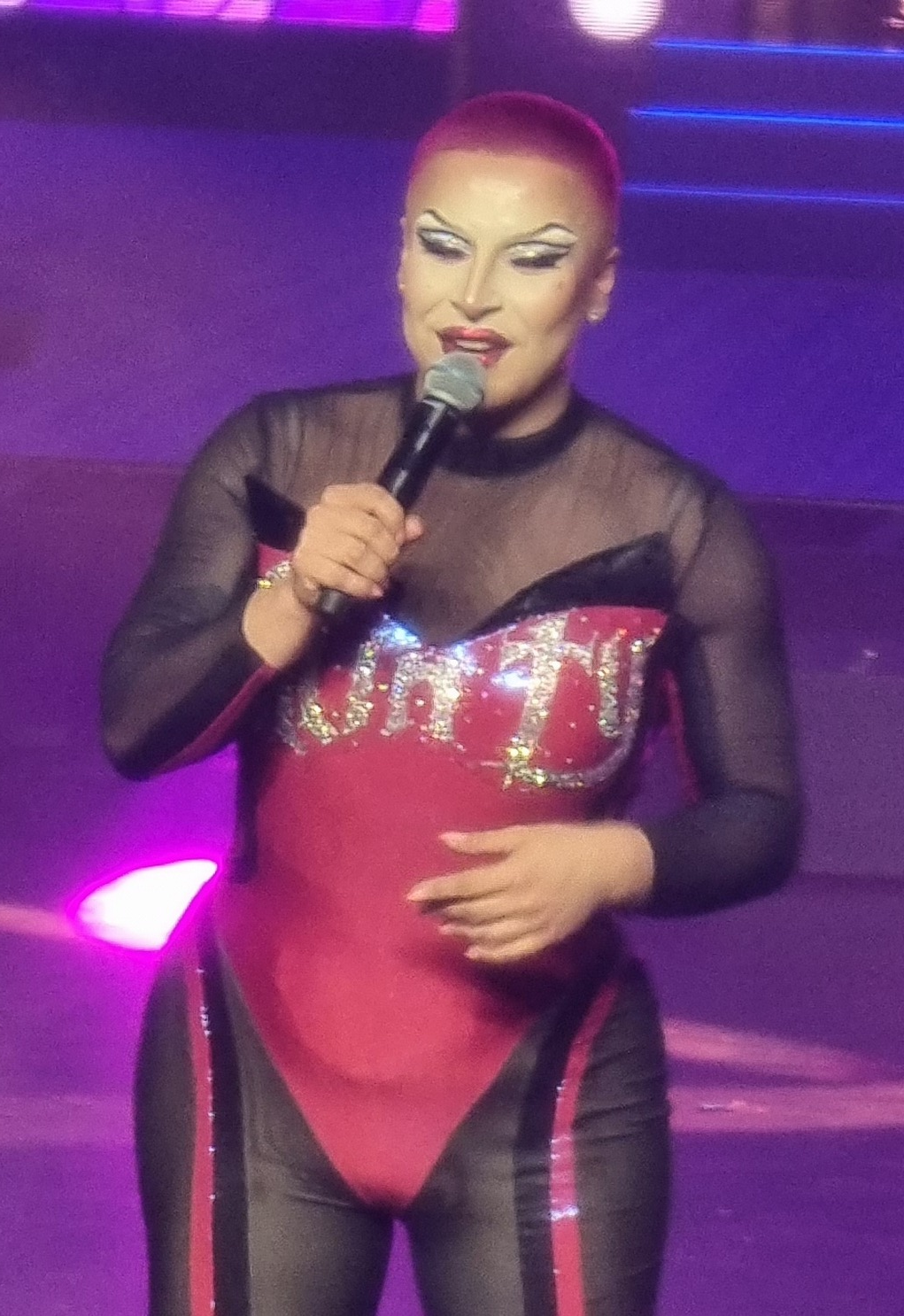
- Cookie Kunty in 2023
- Born: Romain Eck; October 19
- Occupation: Drag queen
- Television: Drag Race France (season 2)

Cookie Kunty is the stage name of Romain Eck, a Canadian drag performer who competed on the second season of Drag Race France.

== Personal life ==
As of 2023 they were based in Paris, France.

== Filmography ==
Films

- Three Nights a Week (2022)

Television

- Drag Race France (season 2)
- Bring Back My Girls
