= Three Nights a Week =

2022 French romance film

- Directed by: Florent Gouëlou
- Screenplay by: Florent Gouëlou; Raphaëlle Valbrune-Desplechin
- Produced by: Nelson Ghrénassia
- Starring: Pablo Pauly; Romain Eck; Hafsia Herzi
- Cinematography: Vadim Alsayed
- Edited by: Louis Richard
- Music by: Villeneuve & Morando
- Release date: 2022
- Country: France

Three Nights a Week (French: Trois nuits par semaine) is a 2022 French romantic comedy film co-written and directed by Florent Gouëlou, in his feature debut. It premiered at the 79th edition of the Venice Film Festival.

== Cast ==
- Pablo Pauly as Baptiste
- Romain Eck as Quentin / Cookie Kunty
- Hafsia Herzi as Samia
- Harald Marlot as Bobel
- Mathias Jamain Houngnikpo as Kiara Bolt
- Holy Fatma as Iris
- Calypso Baquey as Cassandre
- ean-Marie Gouëlou as Uncle Jean
- Florent Gouëlou as Javel Habibi
- La Grande Dame as Drag Olympus juror

== Release ==
The film premiered at the 79th Venice International Film Festival, serving as opening film in the International Critics' Week sidebar. It was released in French cinemas on 9 November 2022.

== Reception ==
On the review aggregator website Rotten Tomatoes, 100% of 6 critics' reviews are positive, with an average rating of 7.5/10.
