= Discount (film) =

- Theatrical release poster
- Directed by: Louis-Julien Petit
- Written by: Samuel Doux; Louis-Julien Petit
- Produced by: Liza Benguigui; Philippe Dupuis-Mendel
- Starring: Olivier Barthélémy; Corinne Masiero; Pascal Demolon; Sarah Suco; M'Barek Belkouk; Zabou Breitman
- Cinematography: David Chambille
- Edited by: Nathan Delannoy; Antoine Vareille
- Music by: Chkrrr
- Production companies: Elemiah; France 3 Cinéma; Orange Studio
- Distributed by: Wild Bunch Distribution
- Release dates: 22 August 2014 (Angoulême); 21 January 2015
- Running time: 105 minutes
- Country: France
- Language: French
- Budget: $3.6 million
- Box office: $1.4 million

Discount is a 2014 French comedy-drama film directed by Louis-Julien Petit.

== Cast ==
- Olivier Barthélémy as Gilles
- Corinne Masiero as Christiane
- Pascal Demolon as Alfred
- Sarah Suco as Emma
- M'Barek Belkouk as Momo
- Pablo Pauly as Hervé
- Zabou Breitman as Sofia Benhaoui
- Francesco Casisa as Francesco
- Hafid F. Benamar as Abril
