= Crime of the Century =

Crime of the century is a popular idiom to describe sensational criminal cases.

Crime of the Century may also refer to:

== Film ==
- The Crime of the Century (1933 film), directed by William Beaudine
- Crime of the Century (1946 film), directed by Philip Ford
- Guyana: Crime of the Century, a 1979 exploitation film loosely based on the Jonestown massacre
- Crime of the Century (1996 film), a 1996 television film about the Lindbergh kidnapping
- The Crime of the Century (2021 film), an HBO documentary

== Literature ==
=== Fiction ===
- The Crime of the Century, an 1896 novel by Rodrigues Ottolengui
- The Crime of the Century, the alternative title of About the Murder of the Clergyman's Mistress, a 1931 novel by Anthony Abbot; the second installment in the Thatcher Colt Detective Mystery Series
- The Crime of the Century and Other Misdemeanors: Recollections of Boyhood, a 1974 memoir by John Godey
- The Crime of the Century, a 1975 novel by Kingsley Amis

=== Non-fiction ===
- Forgotten News: The Crime of the Century and Other Lost Stories, a 1983 non-fiction book by Jack Finney
- Crimes of the Century, a 2015 non-fiction book by Katherine Ramsland
- Crime of the Century: The Kennedy Assassination from a Historian's Perspective, a 1982 non-fiction book by Michael L. Kurtz

== Music ==
- Crime of the Century (album), a 1974 album by Supertramp and its title track
- "The Crime of the Century", a song from the musical Ragtime

== Television ==
=== Episodes ===
- "Crime of the Century", Mega Man season 2, episode 14 (1996)
- "The Crime of the Century", 24 Hours in Police Custody series 1, episode 7 (2014)
- "The Crime of the Century", North Woods Law season 2, episode 7 (2013)
- "The Crime of the Century", The Saint season 2, episode 22 (1965)

=== Shows ===
- The Crime of the Century (TV series), 1956 British television drama

== Other uses ==
- Crime of the Century (audio drama), 2011 audio drama

== See also ==
- The Heist of the Century (disambiguation)
- Trial of the century
