= The Finishers =

2013 film

- Directed by: Nils Tavernier
- Written by: Laurent Bertoni; Nils Tavernier
- Produced by: Philip Boëffard; Christophe Rossignon
- Starring: Jacques Gamblin; Alexandra Lamy; Fabien Héraud
- Cinematography: Laurent Machuel
- Edited by: Yann Malcor
- Music by: Barði Jóhannsson
- Distributed by: Pathé
- Release dates: 7 September 2013 (TIFF); 26 March 2014 (France)
- Running time: 95 minutes
- Country: France
- Language: French
- Budget: $8.6 million
- Box office: $5.7 million

The Finishers (French: De toutes nos forces – "With All Our Strength") is a 2013 French drama film directed by Nils Tavernier. It was screened in the Special Presentation section at the 2013 Toronto International Film Festival.

== Plot ==
Paul Amblard had wished to have a son as a second child, a wish fulfilled with the birth of Julien. But when, as a baby, Julien found himself unable to walk like other children, Paul refused to deal with his handicap and took refuge in his job as a cable car repairer and his service as a volunteer firefighter. He shied away from his responsibilities, leaving the whole task of caring for Julien, who uses a wheelchair, to his wife Claire, who had become a mother too protective and fearful for her son's health. At 17, Julien, now a difficult and stubborn teenager, becomes aware of life and dreams of adventures that are inaccessible given his disability. He discovers that his father had been a good athlete 25 years earlier and had participated in an Ironman, an extreme triathlon race. Julien develops the notion that he and his father are going to compete in an Ironman together, with his father pushing or dragging him on suitable equipment. But Paul, who has aged, has done no recent training and is discouraged by life and his sudden dismissal from his job. He brutally rejects this proposal from his son.

Julien's whims and a fugue will gradually convince Paul to try training. While a hint of togetherness, which had been so lacking all these years, begins to emerge between father and son, Claire fiercely opposes this dangerous adventure. But Julien's strength of character and will are stronger than anything: he manages to register the team for the competition without consulting his parents. Eventually Paul relents and they begin training for the race. After starting out on race day, Julien suffers an injury halfway through and his father collapses during the marathon leg, but they still continue and through sheer determination finish the race before the cutoff time.

== Cast ==
- Jacques Gamblin as Paul Amblard
- Alexandra Lamy as Claire Amblard
- Fabien Héraud as Julien Amblard
- Sophie de Furst as Sophie Amblard, Julien's sister
- Pablo Pauly as Yohan
- Christelle Cornil as Isabelle
- Frédéric Épaud as Doctor Pascal
