= 11.6 =

- Directed by: Philippe Godeau
- Written by: Philippe Godeau; Agnès de Sacy
- Based on: Toni 11,6 by Alice Géraud-Arfi
- Produced by: Philippe Godeau
- Starring: François Cluzet; Bouli Lanners; Corinne Masiero; Mehdi Nebbou; Juana Acosta
- Cinematography: Michel Amathieu
- Edited by: Thierry Derocles
- Production company: Pan-Européenne
- Distributed by: Wild Bunch
- Release date: 3 April 2013
- Running time: 102 minutes
- Country: France
- Language: French
- Budget: $9.5 million
- Box office: $2.5 million

11.6 is a 2013 French film directed by Philippe Godeau and starring François Cluzet, Bouli Lanners, Corinne Masiero and Juana Acosta. 11.6 premiered on 3 April 2013 in France, and on 21 April in North America, at the City of Lights, City of Angels film festival.

== Plot ==
Based on Alice Géraud-Arfi's book Toni 11,6 : Histoire du convoyeur, the film tells the real-life story of criminal Toni Musulin, who pulls off one of the largest heists in France's history without the aid of firearms.

== Cast ==
- François Cluzet as Toni Musulin
- Bouli Lanners as Arnaud
- Corinne Masiero as Marion
- Juana Acosta as Natalia
- Johan Libéreau as Viktor
- Mireille Franchino as Svetlana
- Stéphan Wojtowicz as IBRIS intendant
- Jean-Claude Lecas as Lepoivron
- Éric Bernard as Nabil
- Karim Leklou as Bruno Morales
- Jean-Michel Correia as Arbouche
- Mohamed Makhtoumi as Diego
- Christelle Bornuat as Christelle
- Lionnel Astier as the Captain
- Mehdi Nebbou as Monegasque police officer
- Fabienne Luchetti as police chief

== Reception ==
11.6 has grossed $2.5 million in worldwide theatrical box office, against a production budget of $9.5 million. Bouli Lanners received a nomination for Best Supporting Actor at the 4th Magritte Awards.
