= Masquerade (2022 film) =

2022 film by Nicolas Bedos

- Theatrical release poster
- French: Mascarade
- Directed by: Nicolas Bedos
- Written by: Nicolas Bedos
- Produced by: François Kraus; Denis Pineau-Valencienne
- Starring: Pierre Niney; Isabelle Adjani; François Cluzet; Marine Vacth; Emmanuelle Devos; Laura Morante; Charles Berling
- Cinematography: Laurent Tangy
- Edited by: Anny Danché; Clément Selitzki
- Music by: Anne-Sophie Versnaeyen
- Production companies: Les Films du kiosque; Pathé
- Distributed by: Pathé
- Release dates: 27 May 2022 (Cannes); 1 November 2022 (France)
- Running time: 134 minutes
- Country: France
- Language: French
- Budget: €14–15 million
- Box office: $6.7 million

Masquerade (French: Mascarade) is a 2022 French crime comedy-drama film written and directed by Nicolas Bedos. The film was screened out of competition at the 2022 Cannes Film Festival.

== Premise ==
A young gigolo and an attractive con artist plot a devilish scheme on the French Riviera.

== Cast ==
- Pierre Niney as Adrien
- Isabelle Adjani as Martha Duval
- François Cluzet as Simon Laurenti
- Marine Vacth as Margot
- Emmanuelle Devos as Carole Laurenti
- Laura Morante as Giulia
- Charles Berling as Jean-Charles
- James Wilby as Thomas
- Nicolas Briançon as Laurent Bardin
- Philippe Uchan as Claude
- Christiane Millet as Françoise
- Bruno Raffaelli as Serge Bazin
- Daniel Hanssens as Simon's lawyer
- Bérangère McNeese as Peter Glau's wife
- Rachel Bauchet as Margot's daughter

== Production ==
Principal photography began on 8 June 2021 in Nice.

== Reception ==
=== Critical response ===
On the review aggregator website Rotten Tomatoes, the film holds an approval rating of 83% based on 6 reviews, with an average rating of 7/10. Masquerade received an average rating of 2.5 out of 5 stars on the French website AlloCiné, based on 31 reviews.
