= François Cluzet =

French actor (born 1955)

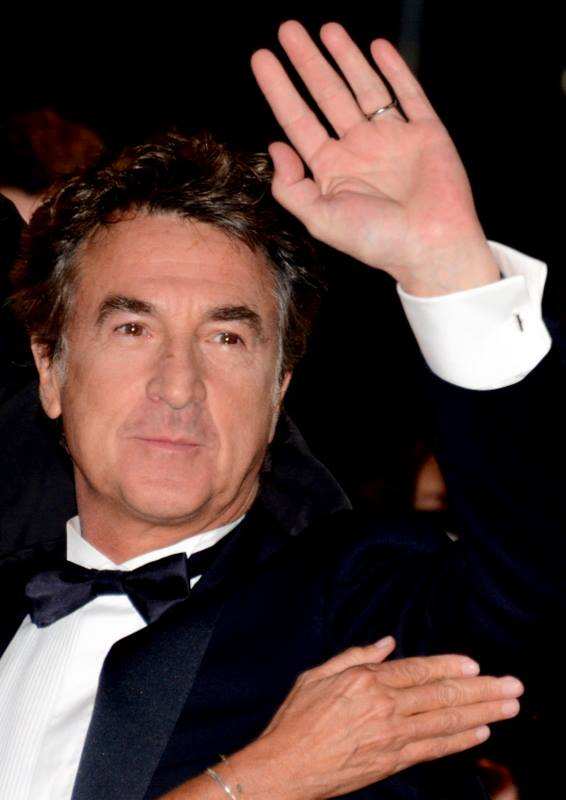
- Cluzet at the 2014 César Awards
- Born: 21 September 1955 (age 71); Paris, France
- Occupation: Actor
- Years active: 1976–present
- Spouses: Chantal Perrin (m. 1980s, divorced); Narjiss Slaoui-Falcoz (m. 2011)
- Children: 4

François Cluzet (French pronunciation: [fʁɑ̃swa klyzɛ]; born 21 September 1955) is a French film and theatre actor. Cluzet has collaborated with many important European and American directors, including Claude Chabrol, Bertrand Tavernier, Claire Denis, Agnieszka Holland, Robert Altman and Olivier Assayas. In 2007, he won a French César Award after starring as a doctor suspected of double homicide in the thriller Tell No One (original title Ne le dis à personne). Cluzet is best known for his role as Philippe in the film The Intouchables (2011).

== Career ==
Cluzet grew up in Paris, and made his stage debut in 1976. Three years later, he made his premiere appearance on the big screen in Cocktail Molotov with Diane Kurys. A year later, Cluzet appeared in acclaimed family drama Cheval d'orgueil directed by Claude Chabrol. The two reunited in 1982 for Les Fantômes du chapelier. In 1983, Cluzet acted in L'Été meurtrier with Jean Becker. He was nominated for a César Award for best supporting role of the year, in the same year he made a list for best new male for film Vive la sociale.

Cluzet next collaborated with a number of major name French directors, all of whom had a predilection towards dramatic works: reuniting with Kurys in 1983 for Coup de foudre, reuniting with Bertrand Tavernier (to co-star in jazz film Round Midnight in 1985), Tony Gatlif (Rue du départ, 1985), Claire Denis (Chocolat, 1987), Pierre Jolivet (Force majeure, 1988, and one new César nomination for best second male role), Bertrand Blier (Trop belle pour toi, 1989) and again Robert Enrico (La Révolution française). Next, the actor worked with Claude Chabrol to play a husband tortured by jealousy in L'Enfer (1994) after having filmed with Chabrol in 1988 for Une affaire de femmes.

In 1994, Cluzet tried international cinema, acting in ensemble movie Prêt-à-Porter for director Robert Altman and romance French Kiss with Lawrence Kasdan. He returned to French cinema and comedy in 1995 with Les Apprentis (César nomination for best actor) and Enfants de salaud with Tonie Marshall, following a new Claude Chabrol: Rien ne va plus in 1997. Cluzet has often portrayed a role of the tormented writer: Fin août, début septembre with Olivier Assayas, L'Examen de minuit (1998), and Je suis un assassin (2004). He played the double of John Lennon in Janis et John (2003) and an animator of teleshopping in France Boutique (2004). In 2005, he played in Le Domaine perdu with Raoul Ruiz. The film portrayed the 1973 coup d'état in Chile.

His starring role came in 2006 as a doctor suspected of double homicide in the thriller Tell No One. For his performance, he received the 2007 César for best actor.

Cluzet's biggest role was in Intouchables (known in most English-speaking territories as The Intouchables). Based on a true story, the film chronicles the friendship between a wealthy quadraplegic (Cluzet) and a young caregiver who had recently been released from jail. In March 2012, The Intouchables became the second highest-grossing French film in France.

== Personal life ==
Cluzet married film producer Chantal Perrin in the 1980s, later divorcing. Cluzet has a son, Paul, with late actress Marie Trintignant. In 1994 he was living with Chiara Mastroianni. Cluzet was in a long-term relationship with actress Valérie Bonneton, the mother of two of his children. In 2011, he married Narjiss Slaoui-Falcoz, whom he had met six months before filming The Intouchables.

== Filmography ==
Year	Title	Role	Director	Notes
1980	Cocktail Molotov	Bruno	Diane Kurys	
1980	The Horse of Pride	Pierre-Alain, the father	Claude Chabrol	
1982	The Hatter's Ghost	the journalist	Claude Chabrol	
1983	Entre Nous	a soldier	Diane Kurys	
1983	One Deadly Summer	Mickey	Jean Becker	
1983	Julien Fontanes, magistrat	Bob Mourèze	Jean-Pierre Decourt	
1985	Les enragés	Marc, dit 'Teuf-Teuf'	Pierre-William Glenn	
1985	Elsa, Elsa	Ferdinand, as adult	Didier Haudepin	
1986	États d'âme	Pierrot	Jacques Fansten	
1986	Round Midnight	François Borler	Bertrand Tavernier	
1986	Rue du départ	Paul Triana	Tony Gatlif	
1987	Association of Wrongdoers	Thierry	Claude Zidi	
1988	Jaune revolver	Jean-Claude Wielzky	Olivier Langlois	
1988	Chocolat	Marc	Claire Denis	
1988	Story of Women	Paul	Claude Chabrol	
1989	Deux	Louis	Claude Zidi	
1989	Un tour de manège	Al	Pierre Pradinas	
1989	Force majeure	Daniel	Pierre Jolivet	
1989	La Révolution française	Camille Desmoulins	Robert Enrico	
1989	Too Beautiful for You	Pascal Chevassu	Bertrand Blier	
1992	Olivier, Olivier	Serge Duval	Agnieszka Holland	
1992	Sexes faibles!	Sébastien Sébastian	Serge Meynard	
1992	À demain	Gilles	Didier Martiny	
1993	L'Instinct de l'ange	Ernest Devrines	Richard Dembo	
1994	L'Enfer	Paul Prieur	Claude Chabrol	
1994	The Wind from Wyoming (Le Vent du Wyoming)	Chester Celine	André Forcier	
1994	Prêt-à-porter	Nina's assistant	Robert Altman	
1995	French Kiss	Bob	Lawrence Kasdan	
1995	The Horseman on the Roof	the doctor	Jean-Paul Rappeneau	
1995	Les Apprentis	Antoine	Pierre Salvadori	
1996	Enfants de salaud	Sandro	Tonie Marshall	
1997	Le déménagement	Claude	Olivier Doran	
1997	Le silence de Rak	Rak	Christophe Loizillon	
1997	The Swindle	Maurice Biagini	Claude Chabrol	
1998	La voie est libre	Jules	Stéphane Clavier	
1998	Late August, Early September	Adrien	Olivier Assayas	
1998	Dolce far niente	Stendhal	Nae Caranfil	
1998	L'examen de minuit	Antoine	Danièle Dubroux	
2002	The Adversary	Luc	Nicole Garcia	
2003	Quand je vois le soleil	Pierre	Jacques Cortal	
2003	Mais qui a tué Pamela Rose?	Gibson	Eric Lartigau	
2003	Janis et John	Walter Kingkate	Samuel Benchetrit	
2003	France Boutique	Olivier Mestral	Tonie Marshall	
2004	The Hook	Ben Castelano	Thomas Vincent	
2005	Le domaine perdu	Antoine	Raoul Ruiz	
2005	La cloche a sonné	Jean	Bruno Herbulot	
2006	Four Stars	Rene	Christian Vincent	
2006	Tell No One	Alexandre Beck	Guillaume Canet	
2007	Ma place au soleil	Paul	Eric de Montalier	
2007	La vérité ou presque	Marc	Sam Karmann	
2007	Game of Four	Lionel	Bruno Dega	
2008	Paris	Philippe Verneuil	Cédric Klapisch	
2008	Rivals	Gabriel	Jacques Maillot	
2009	In the Beginning	Philippe Miller	Xavier Giannoli	
2009	One for the Road	Hervé Chabalier	Philippe Godeau	
2010	Blanc comme neige	Maxime	Anne Fontaine	
2010	Little White Lies	Max Cantara	Guillaume Canet	
2011	Mon père est femme de ménage	Michel	Saphia Azzeddine	
2011	The Art of Love	Achille	Emmanuel Mouret	
2011	A Monster in Paris	Victor Maynott	Bibo Bergeron	Voice role
2011	The Intouchables	Philippe	Éric Toledano and Olivier Nakache	
2012	Do Not Disturb	Jeff	Lisa Azuelos	
2013	11.6	Toni Musulin	Philippe Godeau	
2013	Turning Tide	Yann Kermadec	Christophe Offenstein	
2014	Quantum Love	Pierre	Lisa Azuelos	
2015	One Wild Moment	Antoine	Jean-François Richet	
2016	Irreplaceable	Jean-Pierre Werner	Thomas Lilti	
2016	La Mécanique de l'ombre	Duval	Thomas Kruithof	
2016	The Other Me	Marcel de Chaffe	Sotiris Tsafoulias	
2017	L'école buissonnière	Totoche	Nicolas Vanier	
2018	Naked Normandy	Georges Balbuzard	Philippe Le Guay	
2018	Le collier rouge	Lantier	Jean Becker	
2019	Nous finirons ensemble	Max	Guillaume Canet	
2020	Rose Island	Jean Baptiste Toma	Sydney Sibilia	
2021	The Man in the Basement	Jacques Fonzic	Philippe Le Guay	
2022	Masquerade	Simon	Nicolas Bedos	
2022	Kitchen Brigade, or La Brigade	Lorenzo Cardi	Louis-Julien Petit	
2023	A Real Job (Un métier sérieux)	Pierre Etchevegaray	Thomas Lilti	
2024	Mort d'un acteur	Himself	Ambroise Rateau	Short film; Voice role
2025	Prime Rush (Fils de)	Lionel Perrin	Carlos Abascal Peiro	
2026	Good Vibes Only (Pour le plaisir)	Thomas	Reem Kherici	

== Theatre ==
- 1992: Belgicae by Anita Van Belle, directed by Pierre Pradinas, at the Festival d'Avignon

== Awards ==
- 1984 : Nominated for César Award for Most Promising Actor for Vive la sociale
- 1984 : Nominated for César Award for Best Supporting Actor for One Deadly Summer
- 1984 : Prix Jean Gabin
- 1990 : Nominated for César Award for Best Supporting Actor for Force majeure
- 1996 : Nominated for César Award for Best Actor for Les Apprentis
- 2003 : Nominated for César Award for Best Supporting Actor for The Adversary
- 2007 : Nominated for César Award for Best Supporting Actor for Quatre étoiles
- 2007 : César Award for Best Actor for Tell No One
- 2007 : Nominated for Lumière Award for Best Actor for Tell No One
- 2007 : Étoile d'or du premier rôle masculin for Tell No One
- 2007 : Globes de Cristal Award for Best Actor for Tell No One
- 2010 : Nominated for César Award for Best Actor for One for the Road
- 2010 : Nominated for César Award for Best Actor for In the Beginning
- 2010 : Nominated for Lumière Award for Best Actor for In the Beginning
- 2010 : Nominated for Globes de Cristal Award for Best Actor for In the Beginning
- 2010 : Étoile d'Or for In the Beginning
- 2011 : Nominated for Globes de Cristal Award for Best Actor for Little White Lies
- 2012 : Nominated for César Award for Best Actor for The Intouchables
- 2012 : Nominated for Globes de Cristal Award for Best Actor for The Intouchables
- 2017 : Nominated for César Award for Best Actor for Irreplaceable
