= Marc Weitzmann =

French journalist and novelist

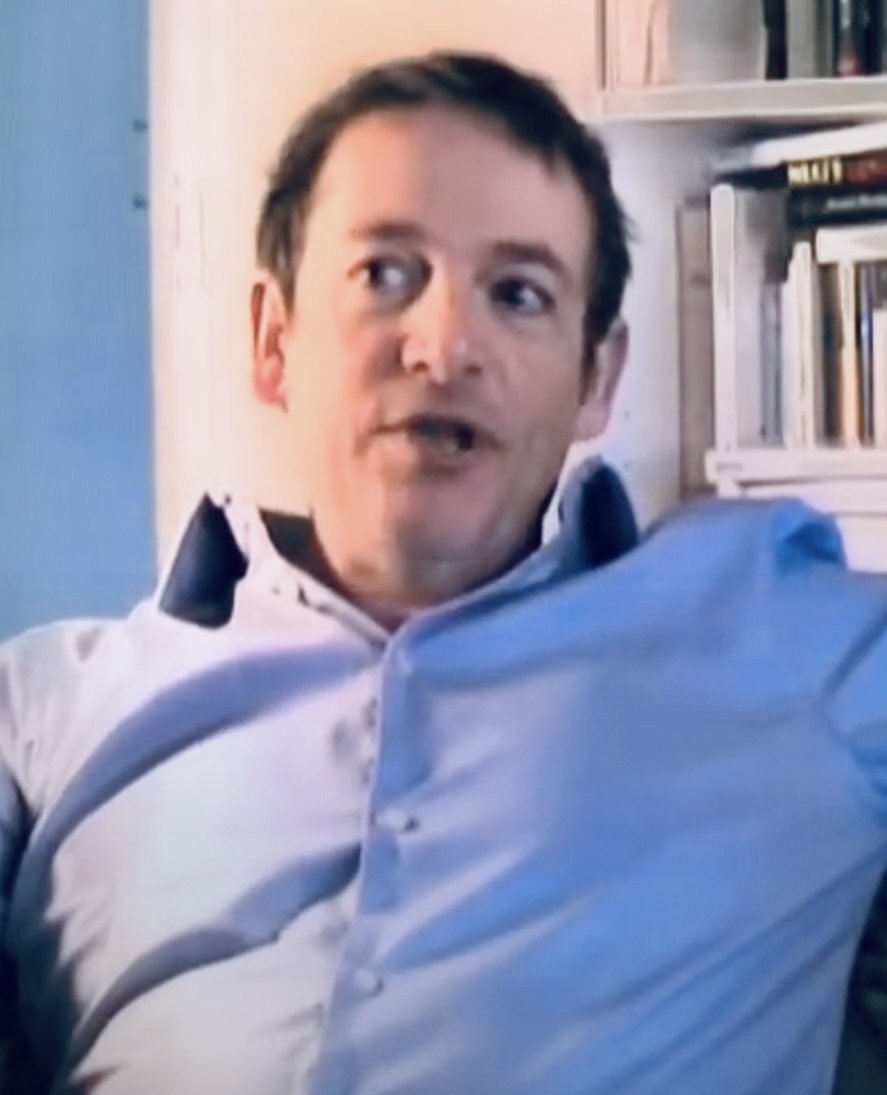
- Born: 1959 (age 66–67); Paris, France
- Occupations: Journalist, novelist
- Relatives: Serge Doubrovsky (cousin)

Marc Weitzmann (born 1959) is a French journalist and novelist. The former editor-in-chief of Les Inrockuptibles, he hosted a weekly radio-show, Signe des Temps (Signs of the Times) on the public radio France Culture, and is a regular contributor to Le Monde, Le Point, Le Magazine Littéraire, and the US news site Tablet Magazine. He is the author of 12 books.

== Early life ==
Marc Weitzmann was born in 1959 in Paris. His family is of Jewish Alsatian, Ukrainian and Polish descent. He grew up in Reims and Besançon, where his father worked as a theatre actor. His parents were Communists. One of his cousins was the writer Serge Doubrovsky.

== Career ==
Weitzmann began a career as a journalist in the early 80's. He became literary editor of Les Inrockuptibles in 1995, and eventually its editor-in-chief. More recently, he has written about antisemitism in France in Tablet.

Weitzmann is the author of 12 books, including seven novels. His books deal with father and son relationships, as well as topics like globalization, terrorism, identity politics and social atomization. His second novel, Chaos, was an autofiction about his cousin Serge Doubrovsky.

Between 2004 and 2009 he lived between Paris and New York.

In 2009, Weitzmann signed a petition in support of film director Roman Polanski, calling for his release after Polanski was arrested in Switzerland in relation to his 1977 sexual abuse case

During the summer 2014, Weitzmann wrote for Tablet Magazine "France's Toxic Hate", a series of reports on the rise of antisemitism in his country that won the Berman Prize for literary Journalism in London in February 2015. in January 2015, at Philip Roth's suggestion, Weitzmann began a book based on those reports. But the beginning of the terror wave that same month changed the scope of the initial project to a major work in two languages that consumed four years of his life.

The French version of the book, "Un temps pour haïr" was published in October 2018 in France. It has won the "Prix du livre politique étudiant-France Culture" 2019, the Foundation Bernheim Prize 2019 in the category Letters, and was short-listed for the Renaudot and Femina prizes. The US version, "Hate", was released March 12, 2019 by Houghton-Mifflin. In the Wall Street Journal, James Kirchick described it as "an excellent and chilling report-cum-memoir about one of the most unsettling phenomena in contemporary Europe” and Roger Cohen in the NYTBR as "an often illuminating intensity as it grapples with an unresolved French and European quandary." The book is a New York Times Book Review Editor's choice.

In the aftermath of the Christchurch massacre, April '19, Marc Weitzmann published an article in Foreign Affairs called "The Global Language of Hate is French" tracing the intellectual French influences for the killer's manifesto.

== Works ==
=== Novels ===
- Weitzmann, Marc (1996). Enquête. Arles: Actes sud. ISBN 9782742708758. OCLC 729664802.
- Weitzmann, Marc (1999). Chaos. Paris: Gallimard. ISBN 9782070755554. OCLC 468221012.
- Weitzmann, Marc (2002). Mariage mixte. Paris: Librairie générale française. ISBN 9782253152217. OCLC 469632849.
- Weitzmann, Marc (2004). Une place dans le monde. Paris: Stock. ISBN 9782234055636. OCLC 633620104.
- Weitzmann, Marc (2008). Fraternité. Paris: Denoël. ISBN 9782264045706. OCLC 273108357.
- Weitzmann, Marc (2010). Quand j'étais normal. Paris: Grasset. ISBN 9782246773917. OCLC 708216582.
- Weitzmann, Marc (2013). Une matière inflammable. Paris: Stock. ISBN 9782234071650. OCLC 965975264.

=== Essays ===
- Weitzmann, Marc (2002). Livre de guerre. Paris: Librairie générale française. ISBN 9782253943280. OCLC 49568092.
- Weitzmann, Marc (2002). 28 raisons de se faire détester. Paris: Stock. ISBN 9782234054875. OCLC 49567906.
- Weitzmann, Marc (2008). Notes sur la terreur. Paris: Flammarion. ISBN 9782081205574. OCLC 717398232.
- Weitzmann, Marc (2018). Un temps pour haïr. Paris: Grasset. ISBN 9782246852384. OCLC 1056199266. Translated in English under the title Hate.
- Weitzmann, Marc (2025). La part sauvage. Paris: Grasset. ISBN 9782246852407. OCLC 1537993058.
