= Cyril Mennegun =

French film director and screenwriter (born 1975)

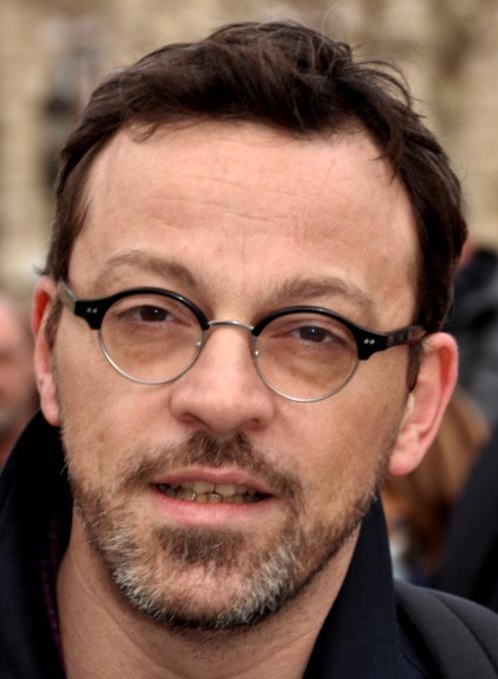
- Cyril Mennegun in 2010
- Born: 26 March 1975 (age 50); Belfort, France
- Occupation(s): Film director, screenwriter
- Years active: 1998–present

Cyril Mennegun (born 26 March 1975) is a French film director and screenwriter. His film Louise Wimmer received the César Award for Best First Feature Film in 2013.

== Filmography ==
Year	Title	Credited as		Notes
Year	Title	Director	Screenwriter	Notes
1998	Le Premier des deux qui rira	Yes	Yes	Short film
2002	Quel travail	Yes		Documentary
2004	Nous, les apprentis	Yes		Documentary
2004	Jours précaires	Yes		Documentary
2005	Tahar l'étudiant	Yes		Documentary (also as cinematographer)
2006	Le Journal de Dominique	Yes		Documentary
2006	Bienvenue chez Adama	Yes		Short documentary
2007	Tous Européens ! Fabien (France)	Yes		Short documentary
2007	Medef, l'effet Parisot	Yes		Documentary
2008	Une vie d'enfant	Yes	Yes	Documentary (also as cinematographer)
2009	20 ans, le monde et nous	Yes		Documentary (also as cinematographer and editor)
2009	Tout le poids du monde	Yes		Documentary
2011	Louise Wimmer	Yes	Yes	César Award for Best First Feature Film; Louis Delluc Prize for Best First Film; Nominated—Lumière Award for Best Director
2016	Daniel	Yes	Yes	
