= Parisienne (perfume) =

Perfume produced by Yves Saint Laurent

Fragrance by Yves Saint Laurent
- Released: 2009
- Label: YSL
- Website: Parisienne, Yves Saint Laurent

Parisienne is a perfume for women produced by French fashion house Yves Saint Laurent, released in 2009. Its brand ambassador is Kate Moss.
