= In the Beginning (2009 film) =

2009 film

- Film poster
- Directed by: Xavier Giannoli
- Written by: Xavier Giannoli
- Produced by: Pierre-Ange Le Pogam; Celia Simonnet; Edouard Weil
- Starring: François Cluzet; Emmanuelle Devos
- Cinematography: Glynn Speeckaert
- Edited by: Célia Lafitedupont
- Music by: Cliff Martinez
- Production companies: Rectangle Productions; Studio 37; France 3 Cinéma
- Distributed by: EuropaCorp
- Release date: 20 May 2009
- Running time: 130 minutes
- Country: France
- Language: French
- Box office: $2.8 million

In the Beginning (French: À l'origine) is a 2009 French drama film directed by Xavier Giannoli. The film competed in the main competition at the 2009 Cannes Film Festival.

== Plot ==
The film tells the dramatized true story of Philippe Berre, a Frenchman with a reputation as an impostor. In the film, much as actual events, Monsieur Berre goes to a small town, passing himself off as a civil engineer, and claims that the government has decided to start previously scrapped plans for the construction of a highway. The highway was stopped because of the hermit beetle. He commissions supplies, gains construction vehicles, and brings jobs to the community and actually constructs a section of roadway in the process before being discovered.

== Cast ==
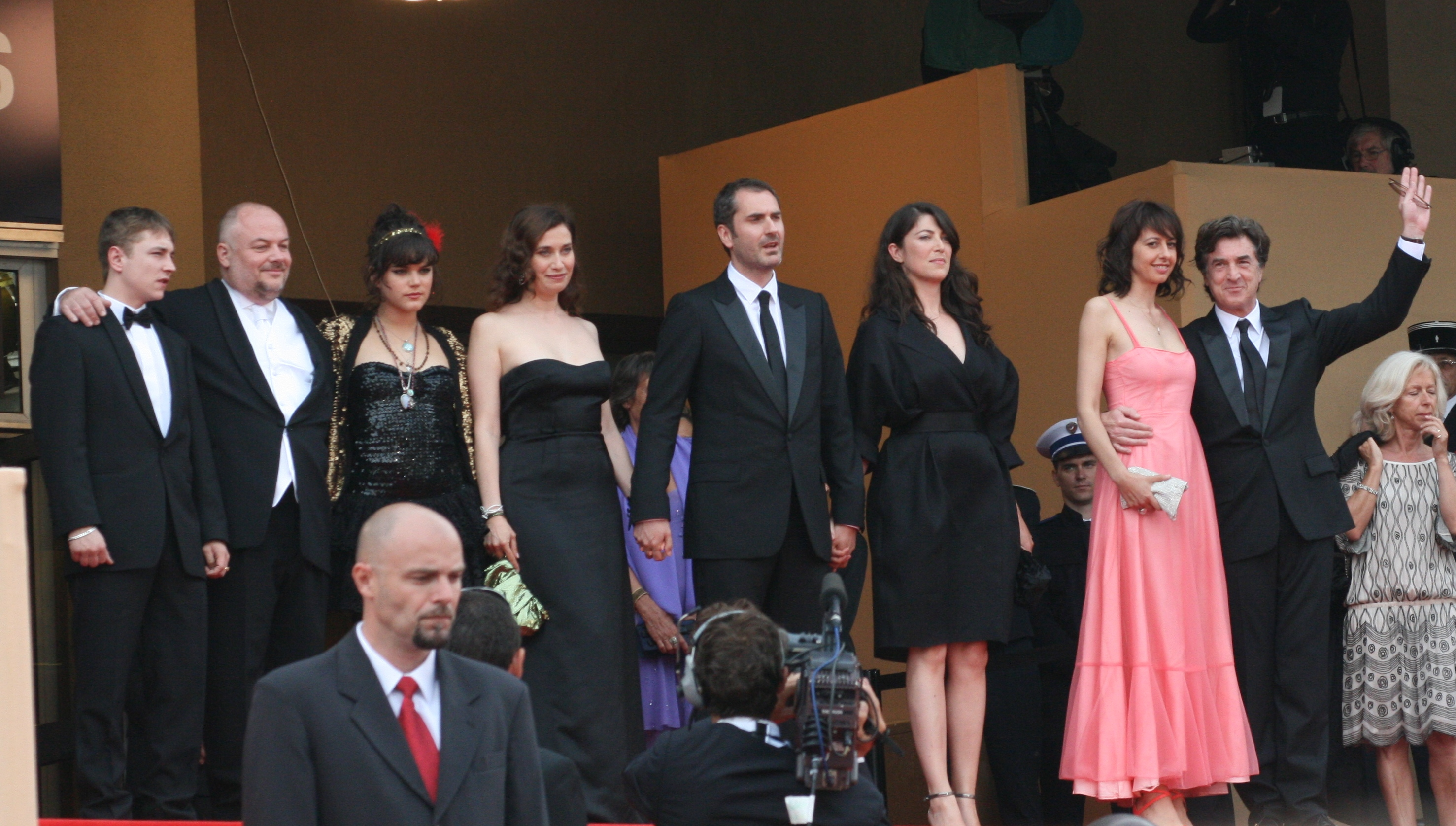
The cast and director at the 2009 Cannes Film Festival.

- François Cluzet as Paul / Philippe Miller
- Emmanuelle Devos as Stéphane
- Brice Fournier as Louis
- Soko as Monika
- Vincent Rottiers as Nicolas
- Gérard Depardieu as Abel
- Corinne Masiero as Corinne
- Patrick Descamps as Bollard
- Thierry Godard as Michel
