= Louis-Julien Petit =

French writer and director (born 1983)

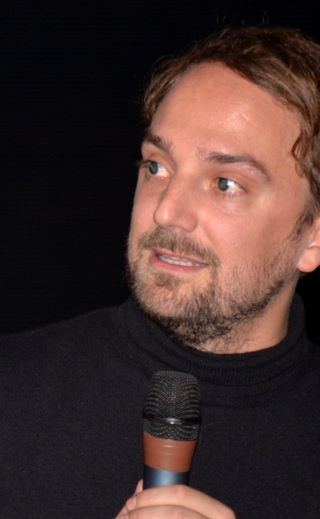
- Born: 6 September 1983 (age 41); Salisbury, England
- Occupation(s): Film director, screenwriter
- Years active: 2006–present

Louis-Julien Petit (born 6 September 1983) is a French writer and director.

== Filmography ==
Year	Title	Role	Notes
2006	Paris, je t'aime	Assistant director	
2007	Have Mercy on Us All	Assistant director	
2007	Conversations with My Gardener	Assistant director	
2007	La route, la nuit	Assistant director	Short
2007	Agathe contre Agathe	Assistant director	TV movie
2007	Boulevard du Palais	Assistant director	TV series (2 episodes)
2008	Agathe Cléry	Assistant director	
2008	Welcome to the Sticks	Assistant director	
2009	Les figures	Director & writer	Short
2009	Chéri	Assistant director	
2009	Inglourious Basterds	Assistant director	
2009	In the Beginning	Assistant director	
2009	Espion(s)	Assistant director	
2009	Je vais te manquer	Assistant director	
2010	Inception	Assistant director	
2010	Ensemble, c'est trop	Assistant director	
2010	Toi, moi, les autres	Assistant director	
2010	Leçon de ténèbres	Assistant director	Short
2011	Hugo	Assistant director	
2011	One Day	Assistant director	
2011	Monte Carlo	Assistant director	
2011	Au bistro du coin	Assistant director	
2011	Oka!	Assistant director	
2011	Aïcha	Assistant director	TV series (1 episode)
2012	Safe House	Assistant director	
2012	Superstar	Assistant director	
2013	11.6	Assistant director	
2013	Mr. Morgan's Last Love	Assistant director	
2013	Hôtel Normandy	Assistant director	
2013	Anna et Otto	Director & writer	
2014	The Finishers	Assistant director	
2014	Amour sur place ou à emporter	Assistant director	
2015	Discount	Director & writer	
2016	Carole Matthieu	Director & writer	
2019	Invisibles	Director & writer	
2022	Kitchen Brigade	Director & writer	
