= Michel Poniatowski =

French politician (1922–2002)

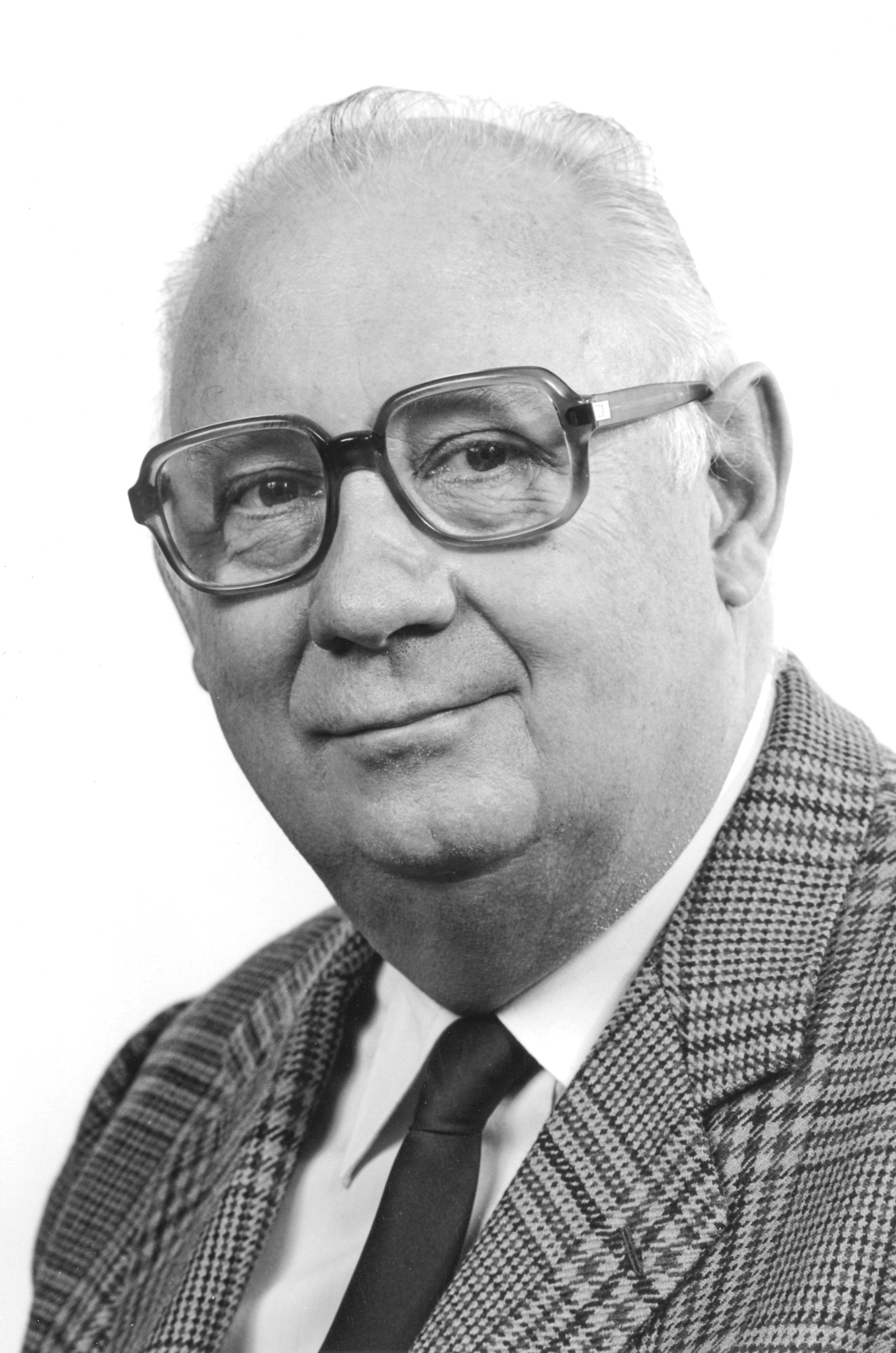
- Official portrait, 1979

Minister of State, Minister of the Interior
- In office 28 May 1974 – 29 March 1977
- President: Valéry Giscard d'Estaing
- Prime Minister: Raymond Barre; Jacques Chirac
- Preceded by: Jacques Chirac
- Succeeded by: Christian Bonnet

Minister of Health
- In office 5 April 1973 – 27 May 1974
- President: Georges Pompidou
- Prime Minister: Pierre Messmer
- Preceded by: Jean Foyer
- Succeeded by: Simone Veil

Personal details
- Born: 16 May 1922 Paris, France
- Died: 15 January 2002 (aged 79) Le Rouret, Alpes-Maritimes, France
- Party: UDF
- Spouse: Gilberte de Chavagnac
- Children: Ladislas Poniatowski; Isabelle Poniatowski; Axel Poniatowski; Bruno Poniatowski
- Education: Lycée Saint-Louis-de-Gonzague
- Alma mater: École nationale d'administration

Michel Poniatowski (16 May 1922 – 15 January 2002) was a French politician, member of a legitimized line of Polish princely Poniatowski family. He was a founder of the Independent Republicans and a part of the administration for President Valéry Giscard d'Estaing. Poniatowski served as Minister of Health from 1973 to 1974 and Minister of the Interior in the Giscard d'Estaing government from 1974 to 1977. He was a founder and honorary president of the Union for French Democracy (Union pour la Démocratie Française, UDF).

== Early life and career ==
Poniatowski was the 7th great-grandson of Prince Kazimierz Poniatowski, older brother of Stanisław August Poniatowski, who reigned as king of Poland from 1764 to 1795. Kazimierz had a son, Stanisław Poniatowski 1754–1833, whose son, Giuseppe Luci (1816–1873), by his mistress Cassandra Luci, was recognized and ennobled in the Austrian Empire on 19 November 1850 as Joseph Michel, Prince Poniatowski, a name and title recognised by Napoleon III when Poniatowski was naturalised in France and became a senator there, both in 1854. Two years later in Paris, Joseph's son, Prince Stanislas Poniatowski (1835–1908), married Louise Le Hon, generally reputed to be the daughter of Countess Le Hon (née Fanny Mosselman) by Charles, Duke de Morny, the illegitimate son of Charles Joseph, comte de Flahaut by Hortense de Beauharnais, sometime Queen consort of Holland as well as the adopted and step-daughter of Napoleon I; thus Louise Le Hon (as a granddaughter of Napoleon III's uterine half-brother) was a niece of the Emperor of France at the time of her marriage to Poniatowski, who was appointed the emperor's aide-de-camp. Their son, André Poniatowski (1864–1954) wed Stockton flour mill heiress Elizabeth Sperry in 1894. The son of that union, Prince Casimir Poniatowski (1897–1980), became the father of Michel by his 1920 marriage to Countess Anne de Caraman-Chimay (1901–1977), member of a Belgian princely family.

Poniatowski attended the Cours Hattemer, a private school. He attended the École nationale d'administration for finance and began his career in Morocco, later becoming a finance attaché in Washington, DC in 1956. In 1958, he became the chief of staff for Pierre Pflimlin, the last president of the Council of the Fourth Republic before Charles de Gaulle. From 1959 to 1962, he was the chief of staff for prime minister, then chargé de mission (1962–1965), and finally director of Insurances at the Minister of Finance from 1963 to 1967.

== 1970s ==
Poniatowski took a founding part in the Independent Republicans (RI) party, and became an RI deputy for the Val-d'Oise in 1967, as well as the general secretary of the Confederation of the Independents before taking the presidency of the party's successor, the Republican Party, in 1975. He was elected mayor of L'Isle-Adam (France) in 1971. Bernard Lehideux served Poniatowski as of his office in 1969. Poniatowski was then named Minister of Public Health and Social Security from 5 April 1973 to 27 May 1974, under the government of Pierre Messmer.

=== Minister of the Interior and State Minister (1974–1977) ===
Poniatowski succeeded Jacques Chirac on 24 May 1974 and served in the post until 1977. Considered as the main organiser of Valéry Giscard d'Estaing's victory at the 1974 presidential election, he was named Minister of State and Minister of the Interior on 27 May, which changed the official protocol of the Republic: the most important minister was no longer the Minister of Justice. Although he was a strong-handed Interior Minister, he suppressed the personal registers (fiches signalétiques), which customers of a hotel were to sign, a custom that remains in force in many countries.

In August 1975, he sent the French military to repress the nationalist rebellion in Corsica by Edmond Simeoni, who had illegally occupied a wine cave in Aleria. Two gendarmes were killed during the assault, leading him, along with Chirac, of being accused of a large part of the responsibility in the violence that hit Corsica.

Following the assassination of Prince Jean de Broglie, a Giscardian deputy, L'Express (January 1977) and then Le Canard enchaîné, in 1980, published documents alleging that Poniatowski had known in advance of the death threats on de Broglie but not acted accordingly. The satirical newspaper recalled that de Broglie had been treasurer of the Independent Republicans and tied to the Matesa scandal, which allegedly funded the RI. Soon after the affair and the failure of the right wing at the March 1977 municipal elections, Poniatowski quit the Ministry of Interior and would not be called again as minister.

After leaving the Barre government, Poniatowski served as the President's special envoy with the rank of ambassador and, among other things, traveled to Tehran on December 27, 1978, for a meeting with Shah Mohammad Reza Pahlavi to assess the situation in Iran on behalf of the President in preparation for the Guadeloupe Conference. In his report, Poniatowski described the Shah as “dignified and of sound mind, though tired, sad, and disillusioned. He felt abandoned by his friends and by the outside world.” The Shah had hoped that the United States would continue to support him.

== 1980s ==
Poniatowski was a founding member in 1978 of the Union for a French Democracy (UDF), the liberal and Christian democrat party that backed Valéry Giscard d'Estaing and tried to rival Chirac's neo-Gaullist Rally for the Republic (RPR). Until 1981, Michel Poniatowski was ambassador and personal representative of Giscard. He was an MEP from 1979 to 1989 and presided in the European Parliament over the Commission on Development and Cooperation (1979–1984) and then the Commission on Energy, Research and Technology (1984).

Poniatowski approved in September 1983 the merger of the electoral list RPR-UDF with the far-right National Front (FN), a party headed by Jean-Marie Le Pen, during the partial municipal election of Dreux. Poniatowski stated, "The fascist danger in France does not come from the right. It comes from the left for which that is its vocation of spirit and method. One must therefore vote against the fascists of the left".

Poniatowski was then senator of the Val-d'Oise from 1989 to 1995 and continued to advocate in favour of electoral agreements with the National Front by taking as model the (difficult) relationship between the Socialist Party (PS) and the Communist Party (PCF). An atypical member of the UDF, which he had co-founded, he was first ignored by his colleagues for his support of the far right, and the National Front's ascension is usually dated from the 1983 Dreux elections. After his support for electoral agreements with the FN during the 1992 regional elections and the 1993 legislative elections, he was finally disavowed by his fellow party members at the end of 1991, but he was neither excluded nor deprived of his honorary presidential functions.

Like many members of the right wing, he supported Édouard Balladur against Chirac during the 1995 presidential election. Three years later, he participated to the right-wing party of Charles Millon, who was excluded from the UDF for the same reasons as Poniatowski, and they founded the Droite libérale-chrétienne (Liberal-Christian Right), which continued to ally itself with the National Front.

Poniatowski finally retreated from political life in 1999 and was replaced as mayor of L'Isle-Adam by his son Axel Poniatowski. He then died three years later, on 15 January 2002.

== See also ==
- Poniatowski
