= André Poniatowski =

Polish nobleman and French financier and industrialist

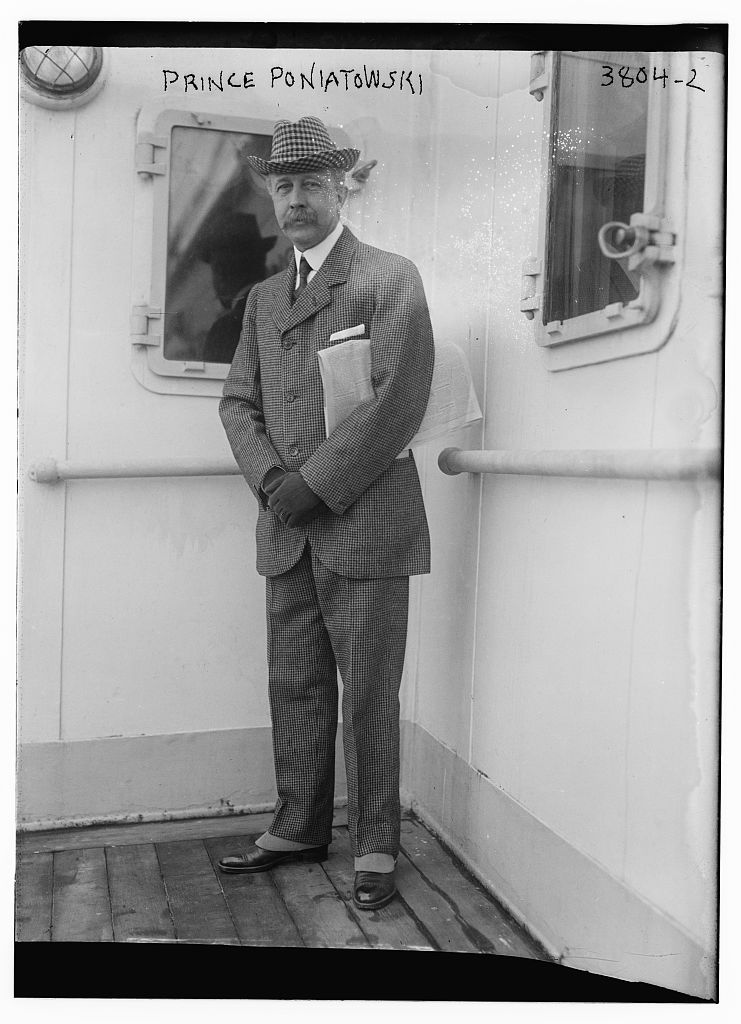
- Prince Poniatowski, 1916

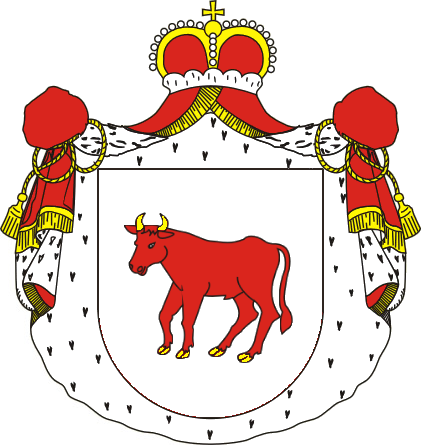
- Coat of arms
- Born: 24 January 1864; Paris, France
- Died: 8 March 1954 (aged 90); Paris, France
- Family: Poniatowski
- Spouse: Elizabeth Helen Sperry
- Father: Stanisław August Poniatowski
- Mother: Louise Le Hon

Prince Louis Léopold Charles Marie André Poniatowski (24 January 1864 – 8 March 1954), was a Polish nobleman, member of the House of Poniatowski who became a prominent French financier and industrialist.

== Early life ==
Prince André Poniatowski was born in Paris, France on 24 January 1864. He was the youngest son of Prince Stanisław August Poniatowski (1835–1908) and Countess Louise Le Hon (1838–1931). His father served as Master of Horse to Emperor Napoleon III of France. He had an older sister and brother, Prince Charles Poniatowski, who married Maud Ely Goddard of New Brighton (a grand-niece of Mayor Smith Ely Jr.).

His maternal grandparents were Charles de Morny, Duke of Morny and the Countess Le Hon (née Fanny Mosselman; although she was married to Count Charles Le Hon when Louise was born). His paternal grandparents were Prince Józef Michał Poniatowski, a prominent composer and a singer, and Countess Matilda Perotti.

Prince Poniatowski graduated from the French Saumur Cavalry School.

== Career ==
In pursuit of investment opportunities, Poniatowski went to San Francisco and formed a syndicate to rework old Gold Country mines using modern methods. To facilitate transportation, he backed Thomas S. Bullock in the construction of the Sierra Railway to get to the mines, and financed construction of the Blue Lakes powerhouse on the Mokelumne River to get electric power to the mines. Realizing the vast potential of this river for hydroelectric power, Poniatowski and his brother-in-law, William Henry Crocker, he formed the Standard Electric Co. in 1897 to build Electra Powerhouse (which later merged into the Pacific Gas and Electric Company). In addition to their railway, mining and power interests, Poniatowski and Crocker built Tanforan Racetrack near Sky Farm, his winter residence in Burlingame.

=== Return to France ===
In 1904, after fifteen years in California, he sold his interests and returned to France with his family. He became "one of the leading authorities on finance, headed the French Finance Company, formed to float issues of American securities in France, and was head of Banque Privée de Lyon."

In World War I, at the age of 52, he served in the French Army as liaison officer with the British Army.

During the Interwar and early World War II period, Poniatowski led the design of experimental infantry tank, SEAM G1P, which had reached the prototype stage, unlike the vehicles proposed by other contesters, however, without weapons and proper engine, which then was captured by German forces. He also proposed a design for superheavy tank, the SEAM 220t.

== Personal life ==
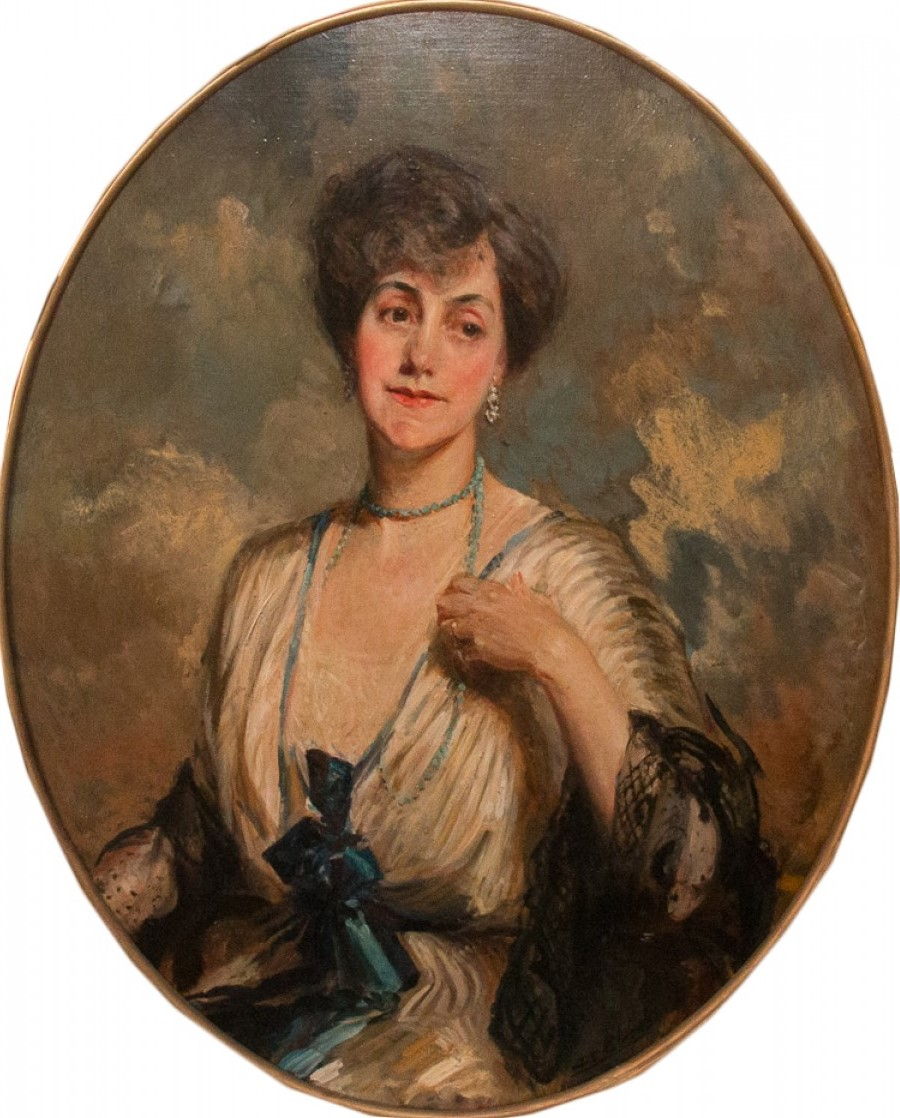
Portrait of his wife, Princess Poniatowski, by Jacques-Émile Blanche, 1906

On 6 October 1894, Poniatowski married Elizabeth Helen Sperry (1872–1911), an heiress from Stockton, California, in Paris. A daughter of Simon Willard Sperry and Caroline Elizabeth (née Barker) Sperry, her sister, Ethel Sperry Crocker, was the wife of banker William H. Crocker. Together, they were the parents of at least five sons, including:

- Prince Stanisław August Poniatowski (1895–1970), who married Aglaë de Sainte-Aldegonde, a daughter of Count Edmond André de Sainte-Aldegonde and Marthe Marie des Acres de L'Aigle.
- Prince Charles Poniatowski (1897–1980), who married Countess Anne de Caraman-Chimay, a daughter of Count Pierre Marie de Riquet de Caraman-Chimay (a son of Joseph, 18th Prince de Chimay) and Marthe Mathilde Barbe Werlé (daughter of Alfred Werlé, whose family controlled Veuve Clicquot), in 1920.
- Prince André John Poniatowski (1899–1977), who married American heiress Frances Alice Willing Lawrance, a daughter of Francis C. Lawrance Jr. and Susan Ridgway (née Willing) Lawrance and cousin to Vincent Astor and Ava Alice Muriel Astor (through Alice's maternal aunt, Ava Lowle Willing).
- Prince Jean Joseph Évremond Sperry Poniatowski (1907–1978), who married French-born Mexican heiress María Dolores Paulette Amor de Yturbe.

In June 1911, the Princess attended the coronation of King George V in London with her sister. She died in Paris only two months later in August 1911, at only 39 years old. Poniatowski died on 8 March 1954 in Cahors, France.

=== Descendants ===
Through his son Charles, he was a grandfather of French politician Michel Poniatowski (1922–2002), who served as Minister of State and Minister of the Interior under his longtime friend, President Valéry Giscard d'Estaing (after having previously served as Minister of Health under President Georges Pompidou).

Through his youngest son Jean, he was a grandfather of writer Elena Poniatowska (b. 1932), who married Mexican astronomer Guillermo Haro.
