= Elena Poniatowska =

Mexican journalist and author (b. 1932)

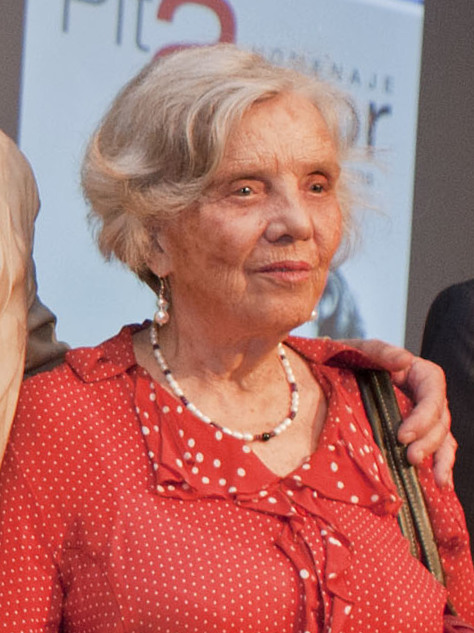
- Poniatowska in 2015.
- Born: Hélène Elizabeth Louise Amélie Paula Dolores Poniatowska Amor; May 19, 1932 (age 94); Paris, French Third Republic
- Occupations: Journalist, author
- Spouse: Guillermo Haro (deceased)
- Children: Emmanuel Haro Poniatowski (1955); Felipe Haro Poniatowski (1968); Paula Haro Poniatowska (1970)
- Awards: Miguel de Cervantes Prize; 2013

Hélène Elizabeth Louise Amélie Paula Dolores Poniatowska Amor (born May 19, 1932), known professionally as Elena Poniatowska (audio), is a French-born Mexican journalist and author, specializing in works on social and political issues focused on those considered disenfranchised, especially women and the poor. She was born in Paris to upper-class parents. Her mother's family fled Mexico during the Mexican Revolution. She left France for Mexico when she was ten to escape World War II. When she was 18, she began writing for the newspaper Excélsior, doing interviews and society columns. Despite the lack of opportunity for women from the 1950s to the 1970s, she wrote about social and political issues in newspapers and both fiction and nonfiction books. Her best-known work is La noche de Tlatelolco: Testimonios de historia oral (The Night of Tlatelolco: Testimonies of Oral History, whose English translation was titled Massacre in Mexico), about the repression of the 1968 student protests in Mexico City. Due to her left-wing views, she has been nicknamed "the Red Princess". She is considered "Mexico's grande dame of letters" and is still an active writer.

== Background ==
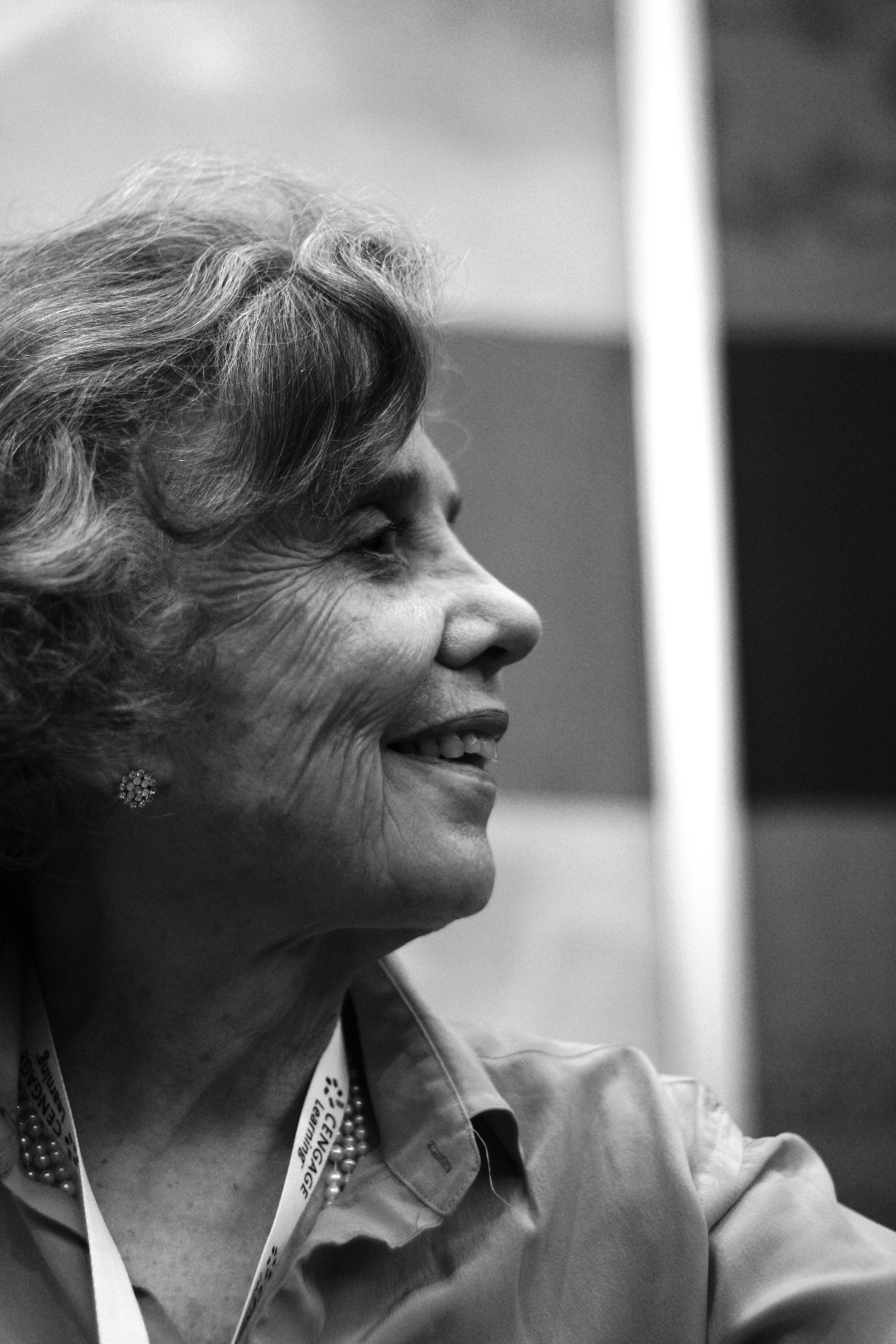
Princess Elena Poniatowska

Poniatowska was born Helène Elizabeth Louise Amelie Paula Dolores Poniatowska Amor in Paris, France, in 1932. Her father was Prince Jean Joseph Évremond Sperry Poniatowski (son of Prince André Poniatowski), born to a prominent family distantly related to the last king of the Polish–Lithuanian Commonwealth, Stanisław August Poniatowski. Her mother was French-born heiress María Dolores Paulette Amor de Yturbe, whose Mexican family lost land and fled Mexico after Porfirio Díaz was ousted during the Mexican Revolution. Poniatowska's extended family includes an archbishop, the primate of Poland, a musician, French politicians, and several writers and statesmen, including Benjamin Franklin. Her aunt was the poet Pita Amor. She was raised in France by a grandfather who was a writer and a grandmother who showed her unflattering photographs of Mexico, including some in National Geographic depicting Africans, saying they were Mexican indigenes, and scared her and her siblings with stories about cannibalism there. Although she maintained a close relationship with her mother until her death, her mother was unhappy about her being labeled a communist and refused to read Poniatowska's novel about political activist Tina Modotti.

World War II broke out when Poniatowska was a child. The family left Paris when she was nine, going first to the south of the country. But the deprivations of the war became too much and the southern part of France, the Zone libre, was invaded by Germany and Italy in 1942, so the family left for Mexico when she was ten years old. Her father remained in France to fight, participating later in D-Day in Normandy.

Poniatowska began her education in France at Vouvray on the Loire. After arriving in Mexico, she continued at the Liceo Franco-Mexicano, then at Eden Hall and the Sacred Heart Convent in the late 1940s. In 1953, she returned to Mexico, where she learned to type, but she never went to university. Instead, she began working at the Excélsior newspaper.

Poniatowska is trilingual, speaking Spanish, English, and French. French was her primary language and was spoken the most at home. She learned Spanish from her nanny and people on the streets during her time in Mexico as a young girl.

Poniatowska and astronomer Guillermo Haro met in 1959 when she interviewed him, and they married in 1968. She is the mother of three children, Emmanuel, Felipe, and Paula, and the grandmother of five. Poniatowska and Haro divorced in 1981, and her ex-husband died in 1988.

Poniatowska lives in a house near the Plaza Federico Gamboa in the Chimalistac neighborhood of Mexico City's Álvaro Obregón borough. The house is filled with books. Spaces without books contain photographs of her family and paintings by Francisco Toledo. She works at home.

== Career ==
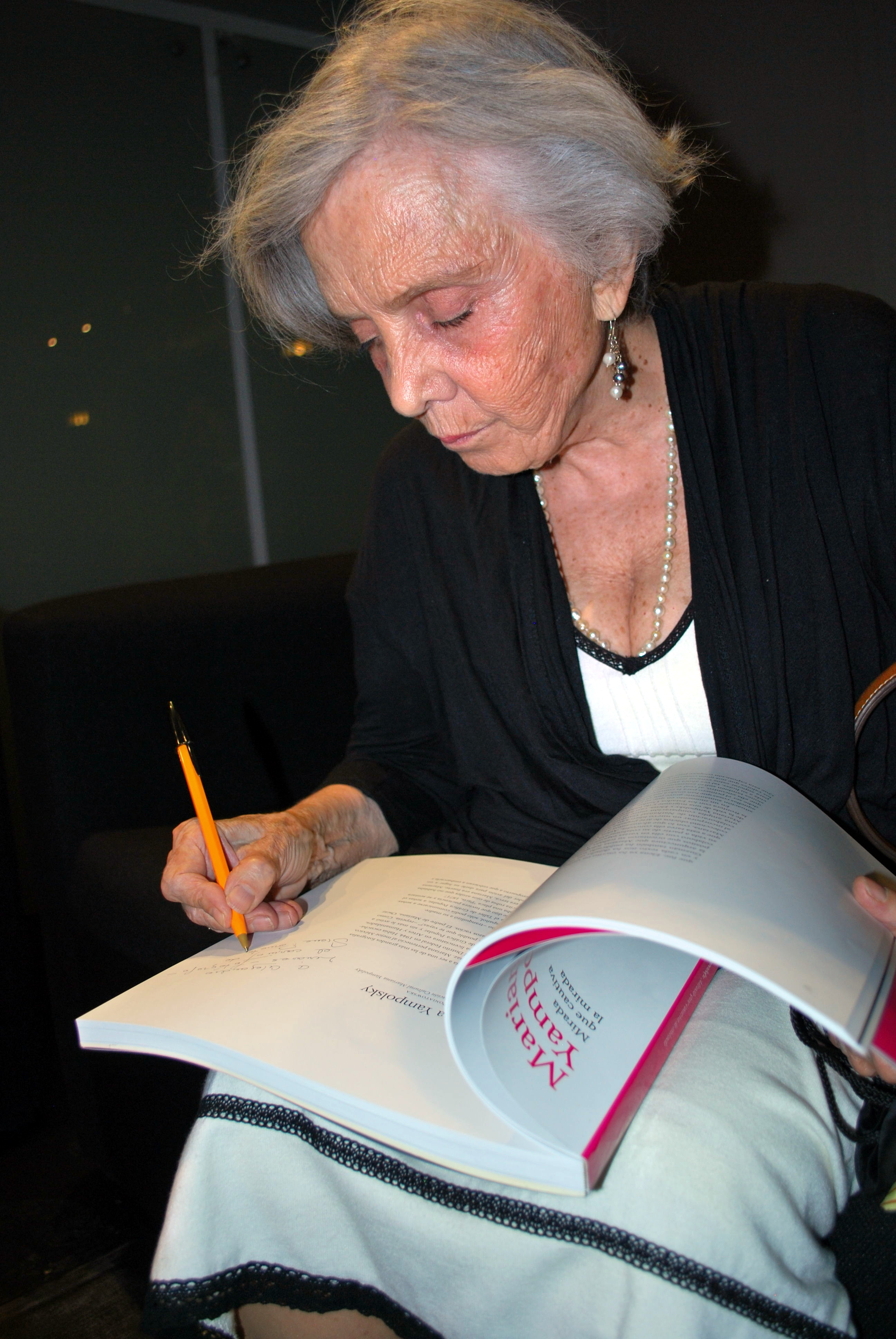
Poniatowska signing book on Mariana Yampolsky at the Museo de Arte Popular in 2012

Poniatowska has published novels, nonfiction books, journalistic essays, and many forewords and prologues to books on Mexican artists. Much of her writing has focused on social and human rights issues, especially those related to women and the poor.

Poniatowska began her writing career in 1953 with Excélsior and the next year with the publication Novedades de México, both of which she still occasionally writes for. Her first writing assignments were interviews of famous people and society columns related to Mexico's upper class. Her first published interview was with the ambassador of the United States. She says she began "like a donkey", knowing nothing and learning on the job. She was first published under her French name, Hélene, but later changed it to Elena, and sometimes used Anel. Poniatowska published her first book, Lilus Kikus, in 1954, and since then has done both journalism and creative writing. The years from the 1950s to the '70s offered limited opportunities for women, but she eventually moved from interviews and society stories to literary profiles and stories on social issues. She emerged as a subtly present female voice in a patriarchal society, even as she was called "Elenita" (little Elena) and her work was often dismissed as naïve interviews and children's literature. She progressed by persistence rather than direct confrontation.

Poniatowska most influential work has been "testimonial narratives", writings based both on historical facts and accounts by people normally not recorded by the media. She began writing on social issues after a visit to Lecumberri, a prison, to interview several incarcerated railway workers who had gone on strike. She found prisoners eager to talk and share their life stories. She interviewed Subcomandante Marcos in 1994. Much of this work has been compiled into seven volumes, including Todo México (1991–1999), Domingo siete (1982), and Palabras cruzadas (1961). Her best-known book of this type is La noche de Tlatelolco, which contains testimony of the victims of the 1968 student massacre in Mexico City.

Poniatowska is one of the founders of La Jornada newspaper; Fem, a feminist magazine; Siglo XXI, a publishing house; and the Cineteca Nacional, the national film institute.

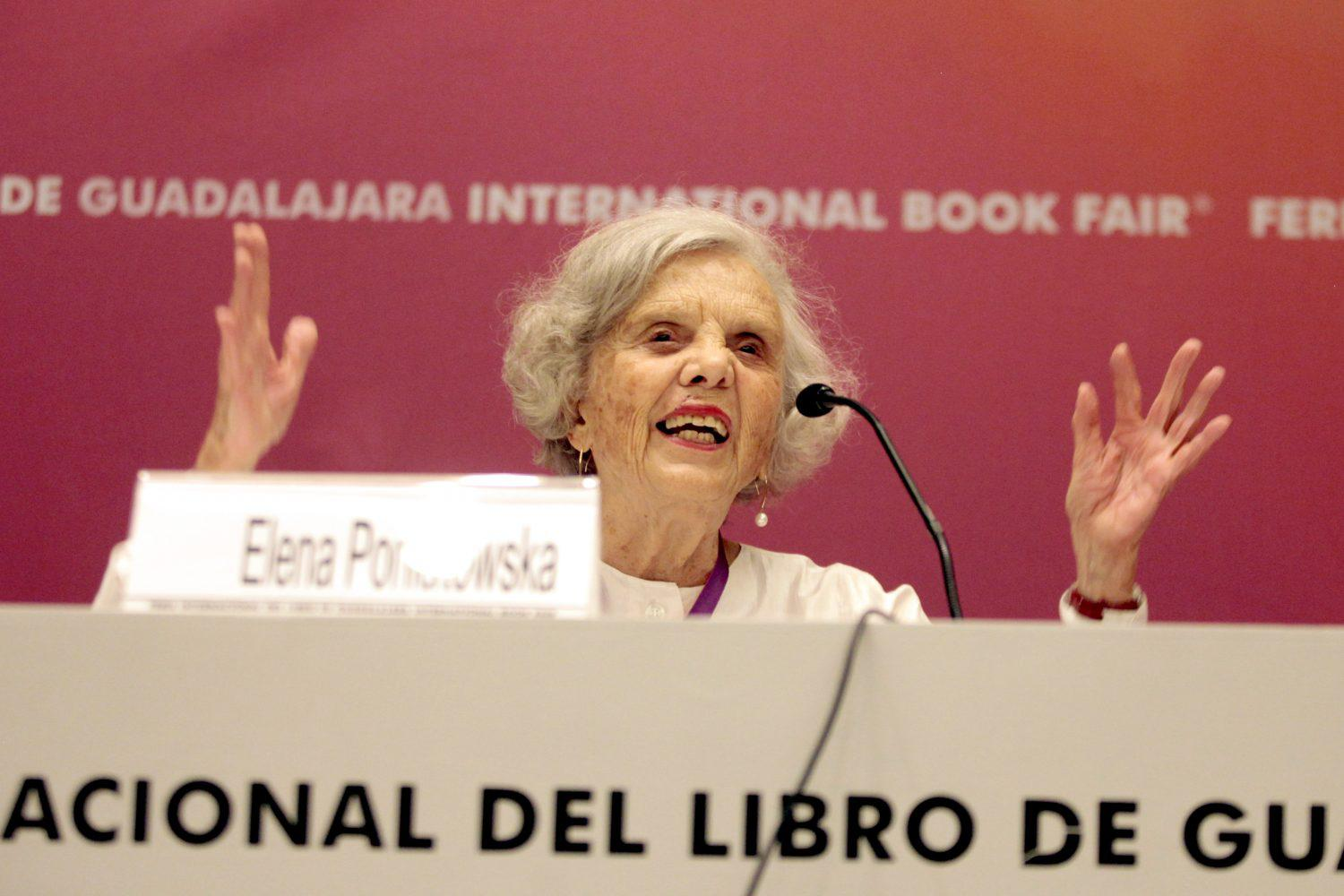
Elena Poniatowska in the Guadalajara International Book Fair in 2017.

Poniatowska's works have been translated into English, Polish, French, Danish, and German, starting in the 1990s. She translated Sandra Cisneros's The House on Mango Street into Spanish. She wrote a play, Meles y Teleo: apuntes para una comedia, a year after the birth of son Emmanuel. In 1997 her novella De noche vienes (You Come by Night) was made into a feature film directed by Arturo Ripstein and starring María Rojo and Tito Vasconcelos. She has also published biographies of the Nobel laureate Octavio Paz and artist Juan Soriano.

Poniatowska often gives presentations and is especially sought for talks and seminars in the United States. She is considered to be Mexico's "grande dame" of letters but she has not been recognized around the world like other prolific Latin American writers of her generation. She has also not been fully integrated into Mexico's elite, never receiving diplomatic appointments, like Carlos Fuentes, and turning down political opportunities. Nor has she spent much time in Mexico's elite literary circles. Fuentes once said that Poniatowska was too busy in the city's slums or shopping for groceries to have time for him and others. She says that such remarks show that she is considered more of a maid, a cook, or even a janitor in the "great House of Mexican Literature".

For over 30 years, Poniatowska has taught a weekly writing workshop. Through this and other efforts, she has influenced a generation of Mexican writers, including Silvia Molina and Rosa Nissán.

== Advocacy and writing style ==
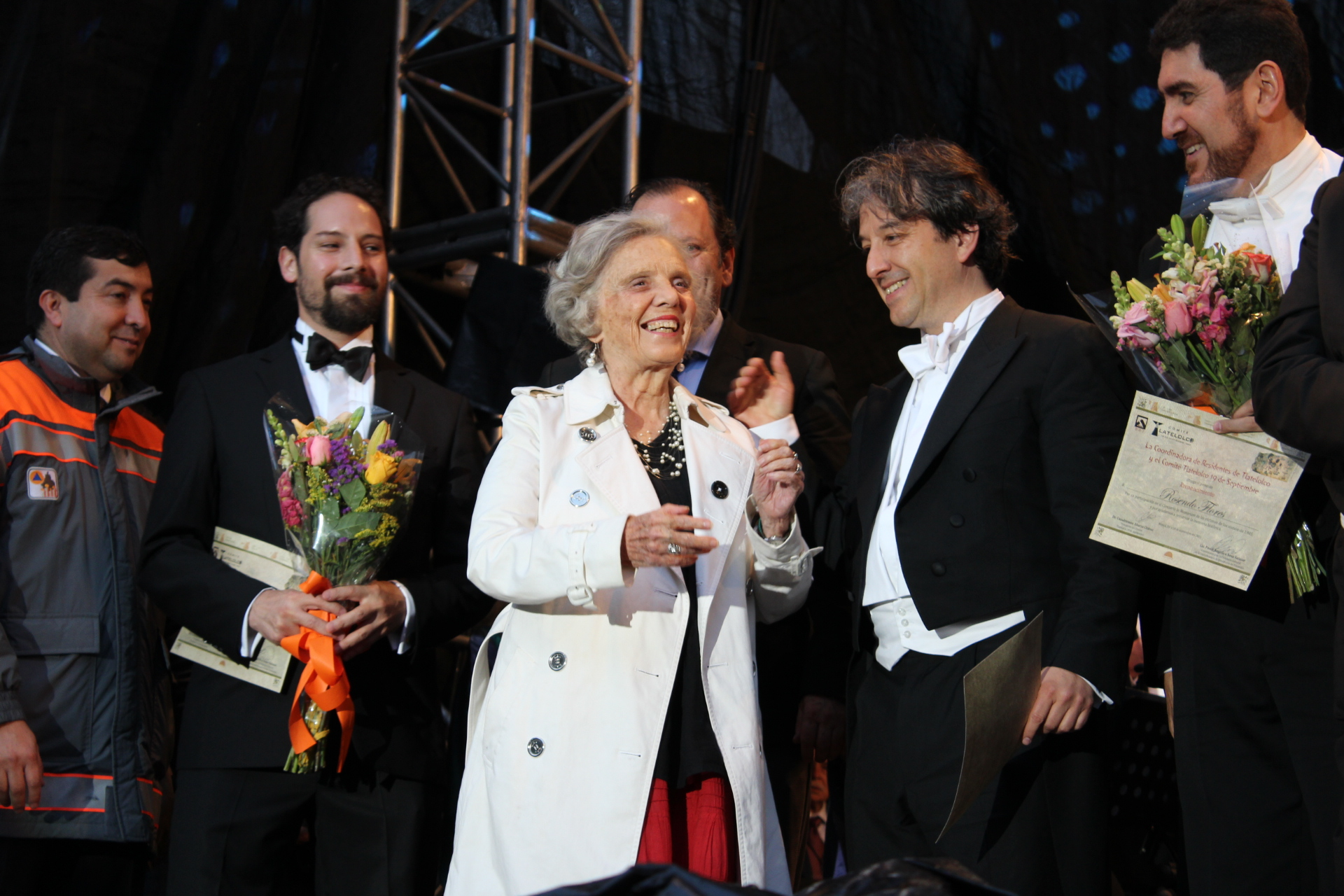
Poniatowska at the 30 year commemoration of the 1985 Mexico City earthquake.

Her work is a cross between literary fiction and historical construction. She began to produce major works in the 1960s and her work matured in the 1970s, when she turned to producing works in put herself in solidarity with those who are oppressed politically and economically against those in power. Her work can be compared to that of Antonio Skármeta, Luis Rafael Sánchez, Marta Traba, Sergio Ramírez, Rosario Ferré, Manuel Puig and Fernando del Paso. Although most of her fame is as a journalist, she prefers creative writing. Her creative writings are philosophic meditations and assessments of society and the disenfranchised within it. Her writing style is free, lacking solemnity, colloquial and close. Many of her works deconstruct societal and political myths, but they also work to create new ones. For example, while she heavily criticizes the national institutions which evolved after the Mexican Revolution, she promotes a kind of "popular heroism" of the common person without name. Her works are also impregnated with a sense of fatalism.

Like many intellectuals in Mexico, her focus is on human rights issues and defending various social groups, especially those she considers to be oppressed by those in power, which include women, the poor and others. She speaks and writes about them even though she herself is a member of Mexico's elite, using her contacts as such on others' behalf. She is not an impartial writer as she acts as an advocate for those who she feels have no voice. She feels that a personal relationship with her subjects is vital. She stated to La Jornada that the student movement of 1968 left a profound mark on her life and caused her consciousness to change as students were murdered by their own police. It was after this that she was clear that the purpose of her writing was to change Mexico. She has visited political and other prisoners in jail, especially strikers and the student protestors of 1968. According to one biography, her house was watched around the clock. She was arrested twice (one in jail for twelve hours and once detained for two) when observing demonstrations. However, she has never written about this.

She has involved herself in the causes of her protagonists which are generally women, farm workers and laborers, and also include the indigenous, such as the Zapatistas in Chiapas in the 1990s. She puts many in touch with those on the left side of Mexico's and the world's political spectrum although she is not officially affiliated with any of them. She considers herself a feminist to the bone and looks upon civil movements with sympathy and enthusiasm. However, she has resisted offers to become formally involved in political positions. She became involved in Andrés Manuel López Obrador's 2005 presidential campaign. She wrote about the seven-week occupation of the Zócalo that followed López Obrador's loss in 2006. She blames Mexico's businessmen and the United States for his loss as well as López Obrador's naivete.

== Major works ==
Her major investigative works include La noche de Tlatelolco (Massacre in Mexico) (1971), Fuerte es el silencio (Strong is Silence) (1975) and Nada nadie. Las voces del temblor (Nothing No one: The Voices of the Earthquake) (1988). The best known of these is La noche de Tlatelolco about the 1968 repression of student protests in Mexico City. She found out about the massacre on the evening of October 2, 1968, when her son was only four months old. Afterwards, Poniatowska went out on the streets in the neighborhood and began interviewing people while there was still blood on the streets and shoes strewn about and women searching for the children who had not come home. The book contains interviews with informants, eyewitnesses, former prisoners which are interspersed with poems by Octavio Paz and Rosario Castellanos, excerpts from pre Hispanic texts and newspaper, as well as political slogans. Massacre in Mexico was the only book published on the subject for twenty years, contradicting the government's account of the events and the number dead. The government offered her the Xavier Villaurrutia Award in 1970 for the work but she refused it.

She did the same after the 1985 Mexico City earthquake. Her book about this event Nada, nadie, las voces del temblor was a compilation of eyewitness accounts not only to the destruction of the earthquake, but also to the incompetence and corruption of the government afterwards.

Fuerte es el silencio is about several themes, especially the families of disappeared political prisoners, the leaders of workers' movements, another look at the massacre in Tlatelolco and others who have defied the government.

Her first novel was Lilus Kikusy from 1954. It is a coming-of-age story about Mexican women before feminism. It centers on an inquisitive girl who is carefully molded by society to become an obedient bride. Tinísima is a fictionalized biography of Italian photographer and political activist Tina Modotti. This book was the result of ten years of researching the life of the photographer and political activist. Querido Diego (Dear Diego) is an epistolary recreation of Diego Rivera's relationship with his first wife, Russian painter Angelina Beloff with the aim of "de-iconize" him.

Hasta no verte Jesús mío (Here's to You, Jesusa) from 1969 tells the story of Jesusa Palancares, a poor woman who fought in the Mexican Revolution and who later became a washerwoman in Mexico City. Based on interviews conducted with the woman who was the model for the main character over a period of some ten years, the book is considered to be a breakthrough in testimonial literature.

Las Soldaderas: Women of the Mexican Revolution is about the women who were in combat accompanied by photographs from the era.

Las siete cabritas (The Seven Little Goats) is about seven women in Mexican society in the 20th century, only one of whom, Frida Kahlo, is well known outside Mexico. The others are Pita Amor, Nahui Olín, María Izquierdo, Elena Garro, Rosario Castellanos and Nellie Campobello.

La piel del cielo (The Skin of the Sky) provides moving descriptions of various regions of Mexico, as well as the inner workings of politics and government.

== Awards ==
Poniatowska's first literature award was the Mazatlan Literature Prize (Premio Mazatlán de Literatura) in 1971 for the novel Hasta no verte Jesús mío. She received this award again in 1992 with her novel Tinísima. The Mazatlan Literature Prize was founded by writer, journalist, and National Journalism Prize Antonio Haas, a close lifelong friend of Elena, and editorial columnist and collaborator next to her in Siempre! weekly news magazine and the national Mexican newspaper Excélsior.

Poniatowska was nominated for the coveted Xavier Villaurrutia Award in the 1970s for her chronicle of the 1968 Tlatelolco massacre, called La noche de Tlatelolco, but refused it in an open letter published in Excélsior newspaper, addressed to then-President Luis Echeverría, who was suspected as responsible for the massacre, stating "Who is going to award a prize to those who fell at Tlatelolco in 1968?"

In 1978, Poniatowska was the first woman to win Mexico's National Journalism Prize of Mexico for her contributions to the dissemination of Mexican cultural and political expression.

In 2000, the nations of Colombia and Chile each awarded Poniatowska with their highest writing awards.

In 2001, Poniatowska received the José Fuentes Mares National Prize for Literature in 2001 as well as the annual prize for best novel by Spanish book publishing house Alfaguara, Alfaguara Novel Prize for her novel La piel del cielo (Heaven's Skin).

The International Women's Media Foundation gave Poniatowska the Lifetime Achievement Award in 2006, in recognition for her work.

Poniatowska won the Rómulo Gallegos Prize in 2007 with her book El Tren pasa primero (The Train Passes First). In the same year, she received the Premio Iberoamericano by the government of the Mexico City mayor.

Poniatowska has received honorary doctorates from the National Autonomous University of Mexico (2001), the Autonomous University of Sinaloa (1979), the New School of Social Research (1994), the Metropolitan Autonomous University (2000) and the University of Puerto Rico (2010).

Other awards include the Premio Biblioteca Breve for the novel Leonora, awards from the Club de Periodistas (Journalists Club), the Manuel Buendia Journalism Prize, and the Radio UNAM Prize for her book of interviews with Mexican authors entitled Palabras Cruzadas ("Crossed Words"). She was selected to receive Mexico's National Literary Prize, but she declined it, insisting that it should instead go to Elena Garro, although neither woman ultimately received it.

In 2013, Poniatowska won Spain's Premio Cervantes Literature Award, the most prestigious Spanish-language literary award for an author's lifetime works, becoming the fourth woman to receive such recognition, following María Zambrano (1988), Dulce María Loynaz (1992), and Ana María Matute (2010). Elena Poniatowska was awarded the Premio Cervantes for her "brilliant literary trajectory in diverse genera, her special style in narrative and her exemplary dedication to journalism, her outstanding work and her firm commitment to contemporary history."

In April 2023, the Senate voted unanimously to award her its Belisario Domínguez Medal of Honor, Mexico's highest active civilian award.

== List of works ==
- 1954 – Lilus Kikus (collection of short stories)
- 1956 – "Melés y Teleo" (short story, in Panoramas Magazine)
- 1961 – Palabras cruzadas (chronicle)
- 1963 – Todo empezó el Domingo (chronicle)
- 1969 – Hasta no verte, Jesus mío (novel)
- 1971 – La noche de Tlatelolco: Testimonios de historia oral, about the 1968 Tlatelolco massacre (historical account) [The Night of Tlatelolco]
- 1978 – Querido Diego, te abraza Quiela (collection of fictional letters from Angelina Beloff to Diego Rivera)
- 1979 – Gaby Brimmer, co-written autobiography of Mexican-born author and disability rights activist Gabriela Brimmer
- 1979 – De noche vienes (collection of short stories)
- 1980 – Fuerte es el silencio (historical account)
- 1982 – Domingo Siete (chronicle)
- 1982 – El último Guajolote (chronicle) [The Last Turkey]
- 1985 – ¡Ay vida, no me mereces! Carlos Fuentes, Rosario Castellanos, Juan Rulfo, la literatura de la Onda México (essay)
- 1988 – La flor de lis (novel)
- 1988 – Nada, nadie. Las voces del temblor, about the 1985 Mexico City earthquake (historical account) [Nothing, Nobody: The Voices of the Earthquake]
- 1991 – Tinísima (novel)
- 1992 - Frida Kahlo: la cámara seducida (in Spanish. Co-written with Carla Stellweg also in English as Frida Kahlo: The Camera Seduced)
- 1994 – Luz y luna, las lunitas (essay)
- 1997 – Guerrero Viejo (photos and oral histories of the town of Guerrero, Coahuila, flooded by damming of the Rio Grande) ISBN 978-0-9655268-0-7
- 1997 – Paseo de la Reforma (novel) [Paseo de la Reforma]
- 1998 – Octavio Paz, las palabras del árbol (essay)
- 1999 – Las soldaderas (photographic archive) [The Soldier Women]
- 2000 – Las mil y una... La herida de Paulina (chronicle)
- 2000 – Juan Soriano, niño de mil años (essay)
- 2000 – Las siete cabritas (essay)
- 2001 – Mariana Yampolsky y la buganvillia
- 2001 – La piel del cielo (novel, Winner of the Premio Alfaguara de Novela 2001)
- 2003 – Tlapalería (collection of short stories) [Translated into English as The Heart of the Artichoke]
- 2005 – Obras reunidas (complete works)
- 2006 – El tren pasa primero (novel, Winner of the Rómulo Gallegos Prize)
- 2006 – La Adelita (children's book)
- 2007 – Amanecer en el Zócalo. Los 50 días que confrontaron a México (historical account)
- 2008 – El burro que metió la pata (children's book)
- 2008 – Rondas de la niña mala (poetry, songs)
- 2008 – Jardín de Francia (interviews)
- 2008 – Boda en Chimalistac (children's book)
- 2009 – No den las gracias. La colonia Rubén Jaramillo y el Güero Medrano (chronicle)
- 2009 – La vendedora de nubes (children's book) [The Seller of Clouds]
- 2011 – Leonora (historical novel on the surrealist painter Leonora Carrington, Seix Barral Biblioteca Breve Prize)
- 2012 – The Heart of the Artichoke. Trans. George Henson. Miami: Alligator Press (collection of short stories) [In Spanish Tlapalería]

== Ancestry ==
Ancestors of Elena Poniatowska

16. Prince Jozef Michal Poniatowski
8. Prince Stanislaus August Poniatowski
17. Countess Matilda Perotti
4. Prince Andreas Poniatowski
18. Charles Auguste Louis Joseph, Duke of Morny
9. Louise Le Hon
19. Françoise Mosselman
2. Prince Jean Joseph Poniatowski
20. Charles Sperry
10. Willard Sperry
21. Hannah Willard
5. Elizabeth Sperry
22. George Russell Barker
11. Elizabeth Barker
23. Eliza Day
1. Elena Poniatowska
24. José Ignacio Amor de Ferreira y Fernández-Carrochero
12. José Ignacio Amor de Ferreira y Escandón
25. María de los Dolores de Escandón y Garmendia
6. Pablo Amor de Ferreira Escandón y Subervielle
26. Pedro Justino Víctor Subervielle
13. Adelaida Subervielle y Acebal
27. María de las Mercedes Acebal y Urbina
3. Paula Amor y de Yturbe
28. Francisco María de Yturbe y Anciola
14. Felipe Pedro de Yturbe y del Villar
29. Cipriana del Villar y Baquero
7. Elena de Yturbe e Idaroff
30. Alejandro Idaroff
15. Elena Idaroff
31. Lydie Ellisen
