= Józef Stanisław Poniatowski =

Polish noble

Stanisław August Poniatowski
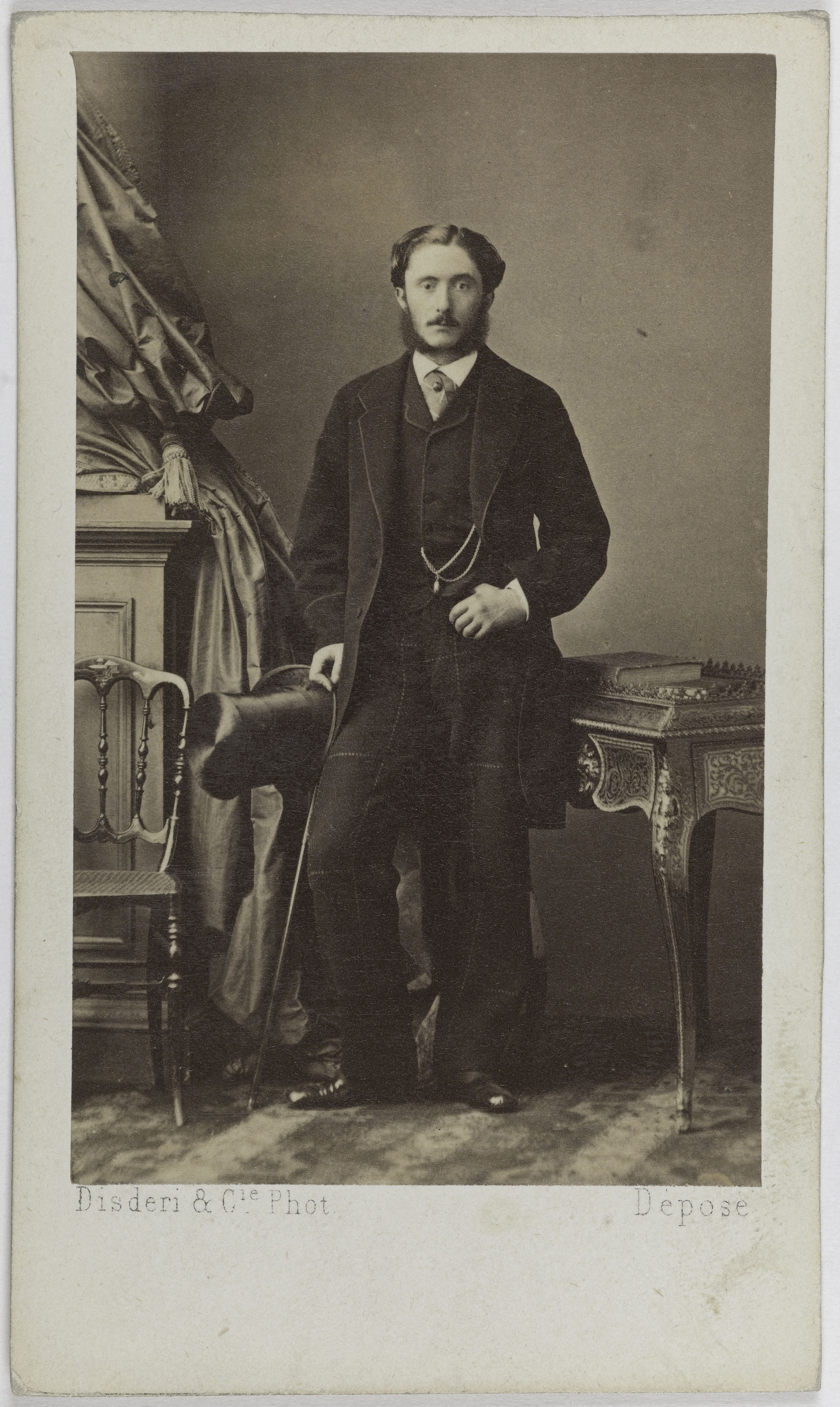

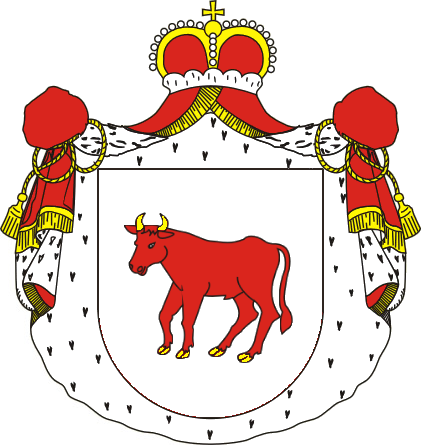
- Coat of arms
- Born: Joseph Stanislaw August Friedrich Joseph Telêmaco Luci Poniatowski; 9 November 1835; Florence, Grand Duchy of Tuscany
- Died: 6 January 1908 (aged 72); Paris, France
- Family: Poniatowski
- Spouse: Louise Le Hon
- Father: Józef Michał Poniatowski
- Mother: Matilda Perotti

Joseph Stanislaw August Friedrich Joseph Telêmaco Luci Poniatowski (9 November 1835 – 6 January 1908) was a Polish nobleman, member of the Poniatowski family.

== Early life ==
Poniatowski was born in Florence in the Grand Duchy of Tuscany on 9 November 1835. He was the son of son of Prince Józef Michał Poniatowski and Countess Matilda Perotti (1814–1875). His father was a composer and a singer, who was sent to Paris as plenipotentiary by Grand Duke of Tuscany Leopold II, and created the first Conte di Monte Rotondo in 1847, and the first Principe di Monte Rotondo in 1850. In 1854, Napoleon III made him a senator and a naturalized French citizen. (Note: After the fall of the French empire in 1870, Józef Michał Poniatowski went into exile in England, as did Napoleon III, his wife, Empress Eugénie, and their son Louis-Napoléon, Prince Imperial at Chislehurst, Kent, where he died in 1873.)

His paternal grandparents were Cassandra Luci and Prince Stanisław Poniatowski, who served as Grand Treasurer of Lithuania under his uncle, the last King of Poland Stanisław August Poniatowski. His great-grandfather Prince Kazimierz Poniatowski was the eldest son of Stanisław Poniatowski and Konstancja Czartoryska.

== Career ==
Prince Poniatowski served as Grand Squire to Emperor Napoleon III of France. In his obituary, the Marquise de Fontenoy wrote:

"The late Prince Stanislas was in may respects an unlucky man; that is to say, he missed several great opportunities. Thus, on the occasion of the memorable visit of Alexander II, of Russia to Paris in 1867 he had been assigned to attend the two emperors on the occasion of the great review held at Longchamps.

Not only had the prince just arrived tired but by a hurried journey from Florence on the morning of the review, but he likewise experienced extraordinary difficulty in getting into the high patent leather boots which formed part and parcel of his uniform as equerry.

One of his fellow equerries, Raimbaud, happened to be calling upon him, and on the prince giving expression to his fatigue and to his disinclination to go on duty, Raimbaud offered to take his place, which Poniatowski gratefully accepted, placing at Raimbaud's disposal his own favorite charger.

Raimbaud had just time to get into his uniform and to take his place on Poniatowski's charger alongside of the imperial equipage when the latter, containing the emperors of Russia and of France, the czarowitz, afterwards Alexander III, and his brother, the Grand Duke Vladimir, started from the Tuileries for the review.

On the return to the city from Longchamps after the great military pageant was over the attempt of Berezowski on the life of the czar took place in the Avenue du Bois de Boulogne. The would-be assassin's bullet was prevented from reaching its billet through the presence of mind of the equerry Raimbaud, who on catching sight of the pistol had spurred his horse, or rather the horse of Poniatowski, forward in such a fashion as to shield the two emperors, and to receive the missile, the horse, which bore the name of Cadogan, falling to the ground mortally wounded.

Of course, Raimbaud was overwhelmed with gratitude by the czar and by Napoleon III, who created him a count, while orders of knighthood were showered upon him by every monarch in Europe."

== Personal life ==
In 1856, he "created a great sensation by marrying" Leopoldina Louise le Hon (1838–1931), the daughter of Count Charles Le Hon and Fanny Mosselman, Countess Le Hon, although she was biologically the daughter of her mother's lover, Charles de Morny, Duke of Morny. Together, they had five children, three of whom survived to adulthood, including:

- Princess Catherine Mathilda Françoise Poniatowska (1857–1942), who lived in the Rue de Rivoli.
- Prince Charles Joseph Stanisław Marie Poniatowski (1862–1906), who married Maud Ely Goddard, daughter of Adelaide (née Ely) Goddard (a niece of Mayor Smith Ely Jr.) and Leonard Wales Goddard of New Brighton, in Paris in 1884.
- Prince Louis Léopold Charles Marie André Poniatowski (1864–1954), a financier and industrialist; he married Elizabeth Helen Sperry, a Stockton flour heiress who was the sister of Ethel (née Sperry) Crocker (wife of banker William H. Crocker).

Prince Poniatowski died in Paris on 6 January 1908.

=== Descendants ===
Through his son Andre, he was a grandfather of Prince Casimir Poniatowski (1897–1980) (who married Countess Anne de Caraman-Chimay and was the father of French politician Michel Poniatowski) and Prince André Poniatowski (1899–1977), who married American heiress Frances Alice Willing Lawrance, a daughter of Francis C. Lawrance Jr. and Susan Ridgway (née Willing) Lawrance and cousin to Vincent Astor and Ava Alice Muriel Astor (through Alice's maternal aunt, Ava Lowle Willing).
