= Poniatowski =

Polish noble family

- Princely arms of the Poniatowski family
- Country: Poland
- Founded: 15th century
- Final ruler: King Stanisław II August
- Titles: King of Poland; Grand Duke of Lithuania; Grand Duke of Ruthenia; Grand Duke of Prussia; Grand Duke of Masovia; Grand Duke of Samogitia; Grand Duke of Kiev; Prince of Bohemia; Prince of Monterotondo
- Estates: Poland, Lithuania, Ukraine, Belarus
- Deposition: 1795
- Cadet branches: Poniatowski di Monterotondo

The House of Poniatowski (plural: Poniatowscy) is a prominent Polish family that was part of the nobility of Poland. A member of this family, Stanisław Poniatowski, was elected as King of Poland and reigned from 1764 until his abdication in 1795.

Since Polish adjectives have different forms for the genders, Poniatowska is the equivalent name for a female member of this family.

== History ==
The Poniatowski family became most prominent in the late 18th century and 19th century. In three generations, the family rose from the rank of gentry to that of senator and then to royalty (in an elective monarchy).

The first information about the family dates back to the end of the 15th century, when they appeared in Poniatowa, 40 km west from Lublin in about 1446. Their family name derives from that place name. Poniatowa was the residence of several branches of the Poniatowski family: Tłuk, Jarasz and Ciołek.

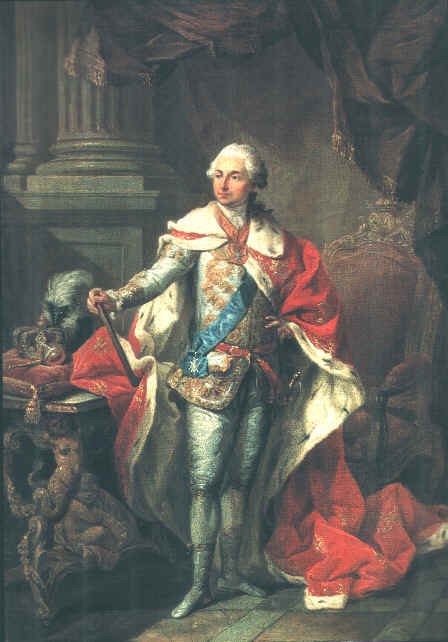
King Stanisław II August.

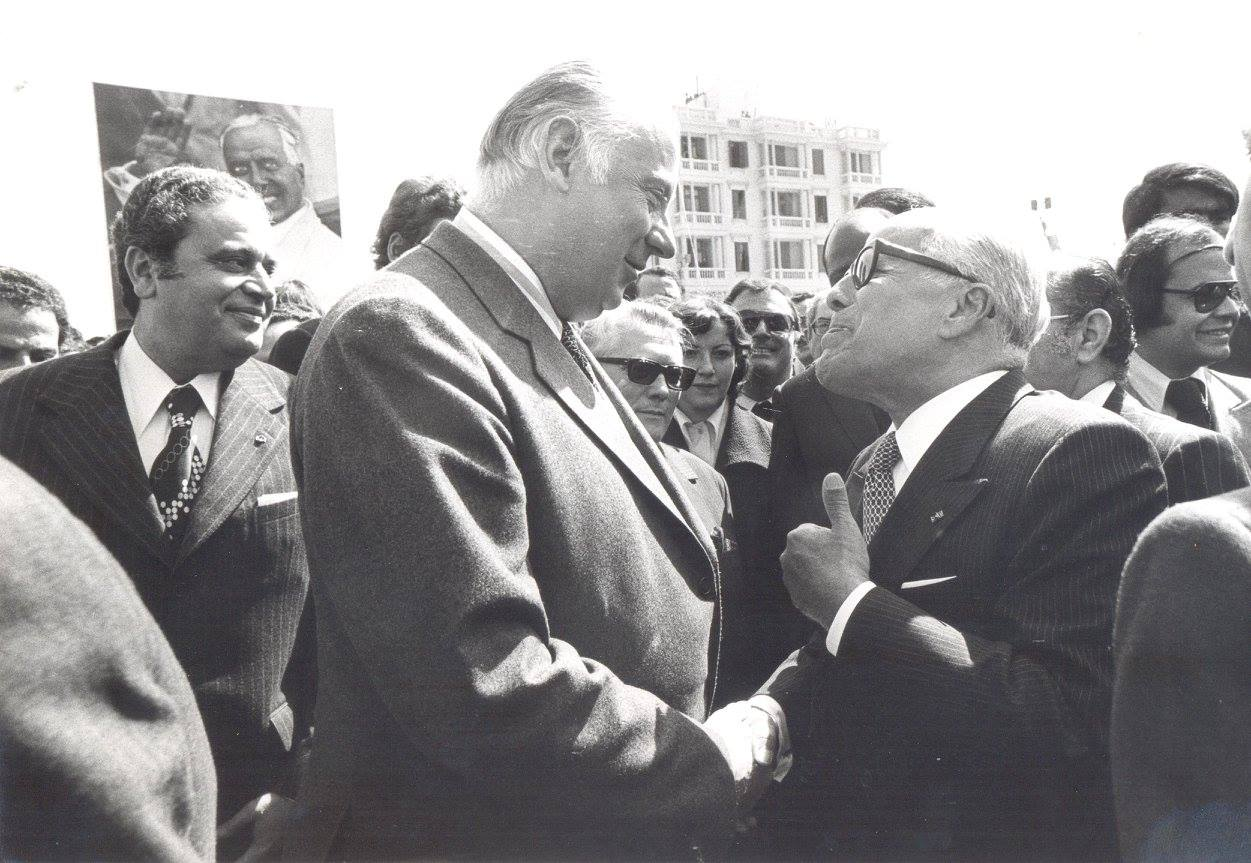
Michel Poniatowski [Left] meeting the President of Tunisia 1976

According to the family's history, the family had ties with the Italian nobility: Giuseppe Salinguerra, a member of the Italian family of Torelli, settled in Poland about the middle of the 17th century, and there assumed the name of Poniatowski from the estate of Poniatow, belonging to his wife, who was the daughter of Albert Poniatowski and Anna Leszczyńska.

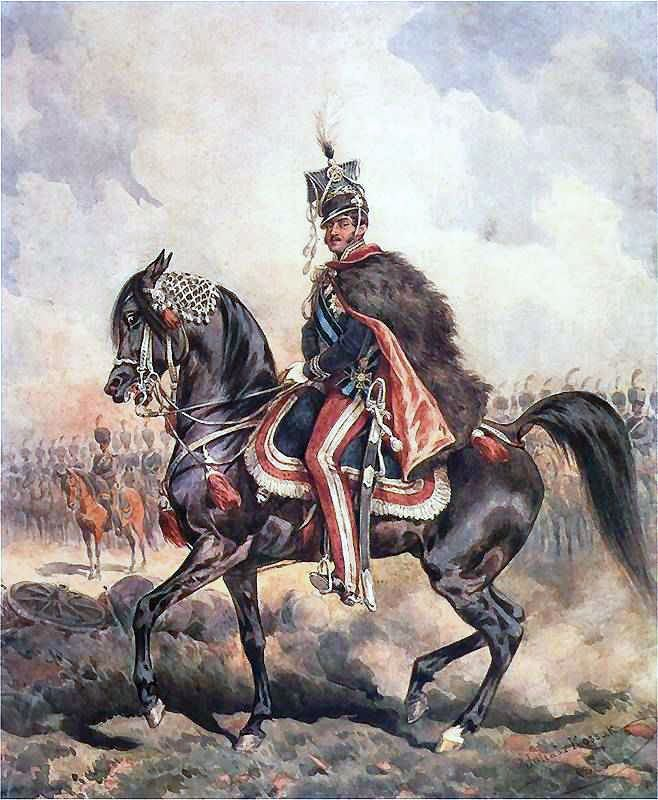
Józef Antoni Poniatowski

On 7 September 1764, at Wola, the most famous member of the family, Stanisław Poniatowski, was elected as King of Poland and Grand Duke of Lithuania. In the same year, the Coronation Sejm awarded the King's brothers hereditary titles of Princes.

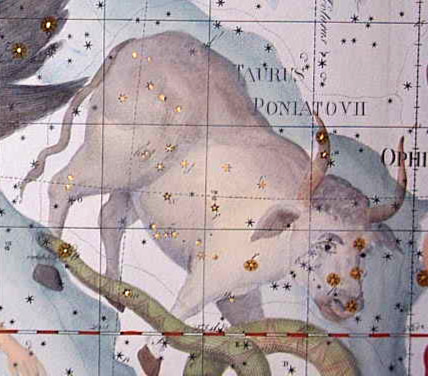
Taurus Poniatovii – a constellation created by Marcin Odlanicki Poczobutt in 1777 to honor Stanislaus Augustus Poniatowski, last King of Poland

Nowadays, there are still Poniatowscy living in Poland, France, Mexico, Italy, Russia, the United States, Germany, and many other countries in the world.

== Members ==
Among most known members are:

- Stanisław Poniatowski (1676–1762), Podstoli, Treasurer, General, Regimentarz
- Kazimierz Poniatowski (1721–1800), General, Great Podkomorzy
- Ludwika Maria Poniatowska (1728–1781), was married to Jan Jakub Zamoyski
- Izabella Poniatowska (1730–1801), was married to Jan Klemens Branicki
- Stanisław August Poniatowski (1732–1798), King of Poland, reigned as Stanisław II August
- Andrzej Poniatowski (1735–1773), General, Marshal of Austria
- Michał Jerzy Poniatowski (1736–1794), Primate of Poland
- Stanisław Poniatowski (1754–1833), Duke, Grand Treasurer
- Konstancja Poniatowska (1759–1830), was married to Ludwik Tyszkiewicz
- Józef Poniatowski (1763–1813), General, Marshal of France
- Jozef Michal Poniatowski (1814–1873), Tuscan plenipotentiary, French senator, composer and singer
- Józef Stanisław Poniatowski (1835–1908), Polish nobleman, son of Jozef Michal
- André Poniatowski (1864–1954), was a Polish nobleman, financier and industrialist, son of Józef Stanisław
- Michel Poniatowski (1922–2002), French politician
- Elena Poniatowska (1932-), Mexican journalist and author

== Coat of arms ==
The Poniatowski family used the Ciołek arms.

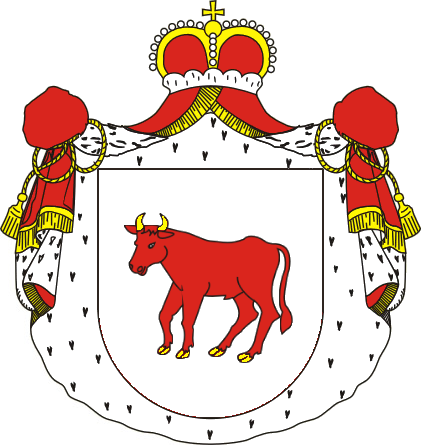
Coat of arms of Princes Poniatowski since 1764

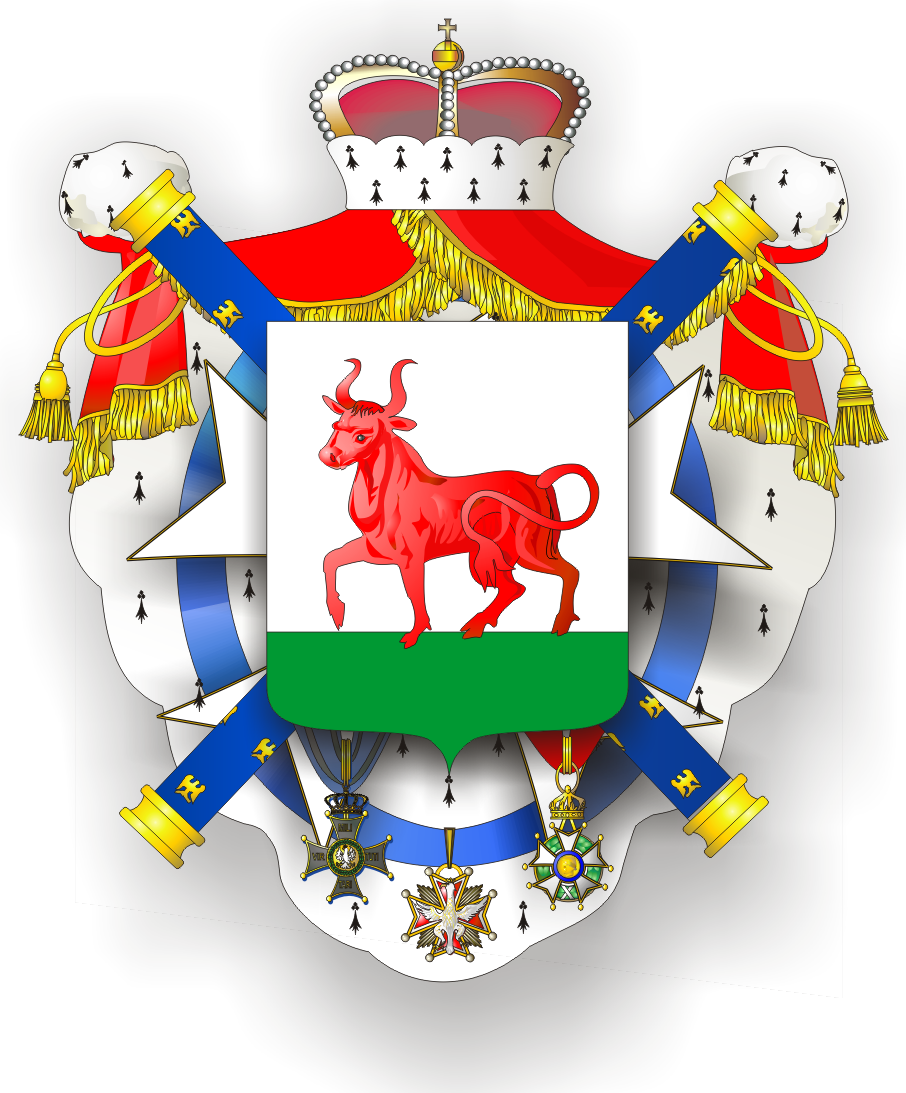
Coat of arms of Prince Józef Poniatowski, Marshal of France, with Order of the White Eagle, Virtuti Militari and Légion d'honneur.

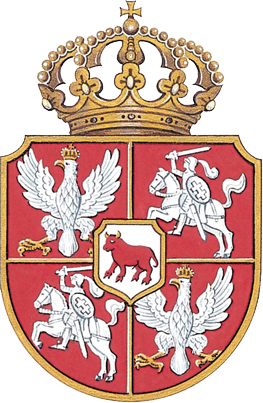
Coat of arms of King Stanisław August Poniatowski

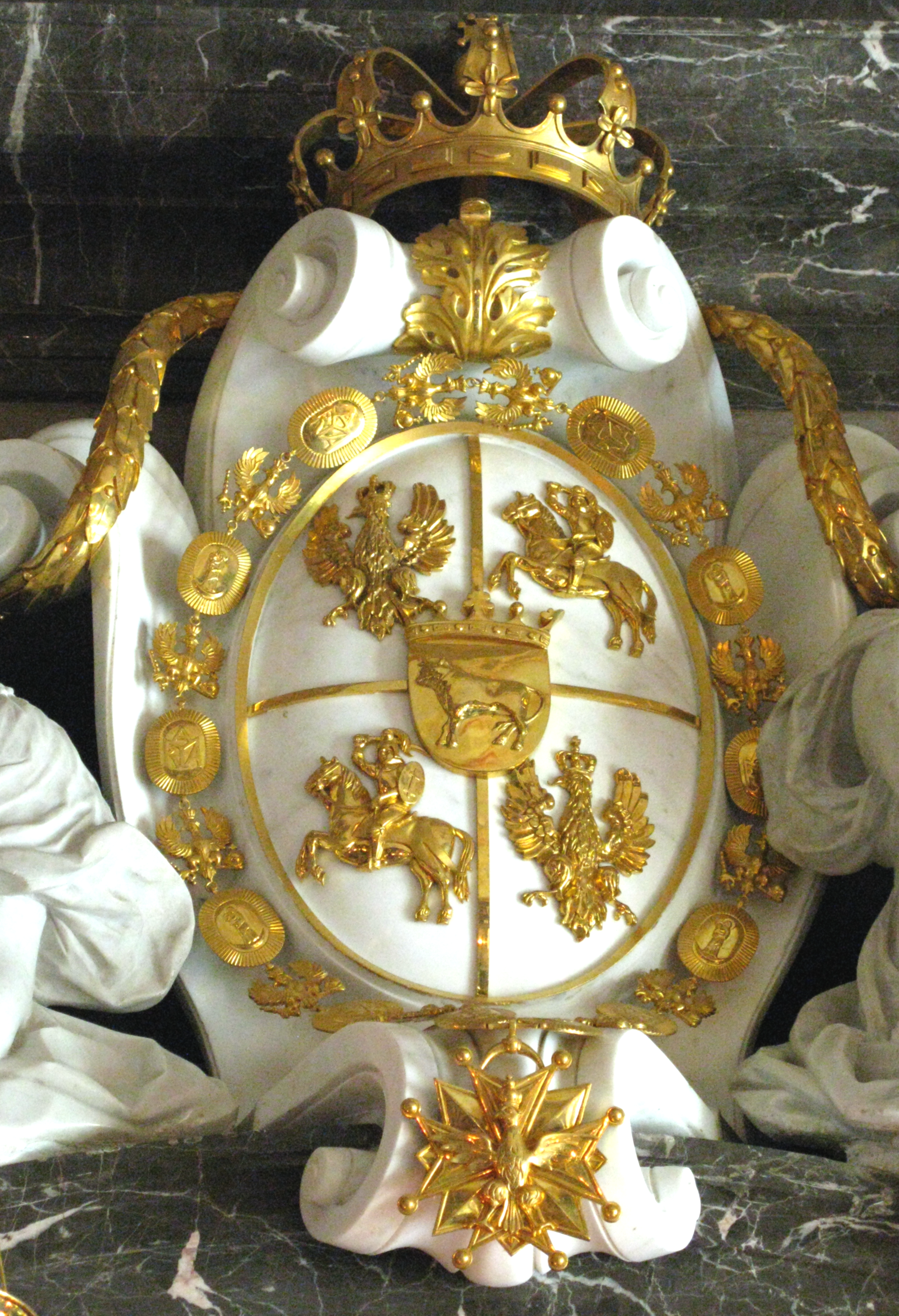
Coat of Arms of Stanisław August Poniatowski with collana of Order of White Eagle

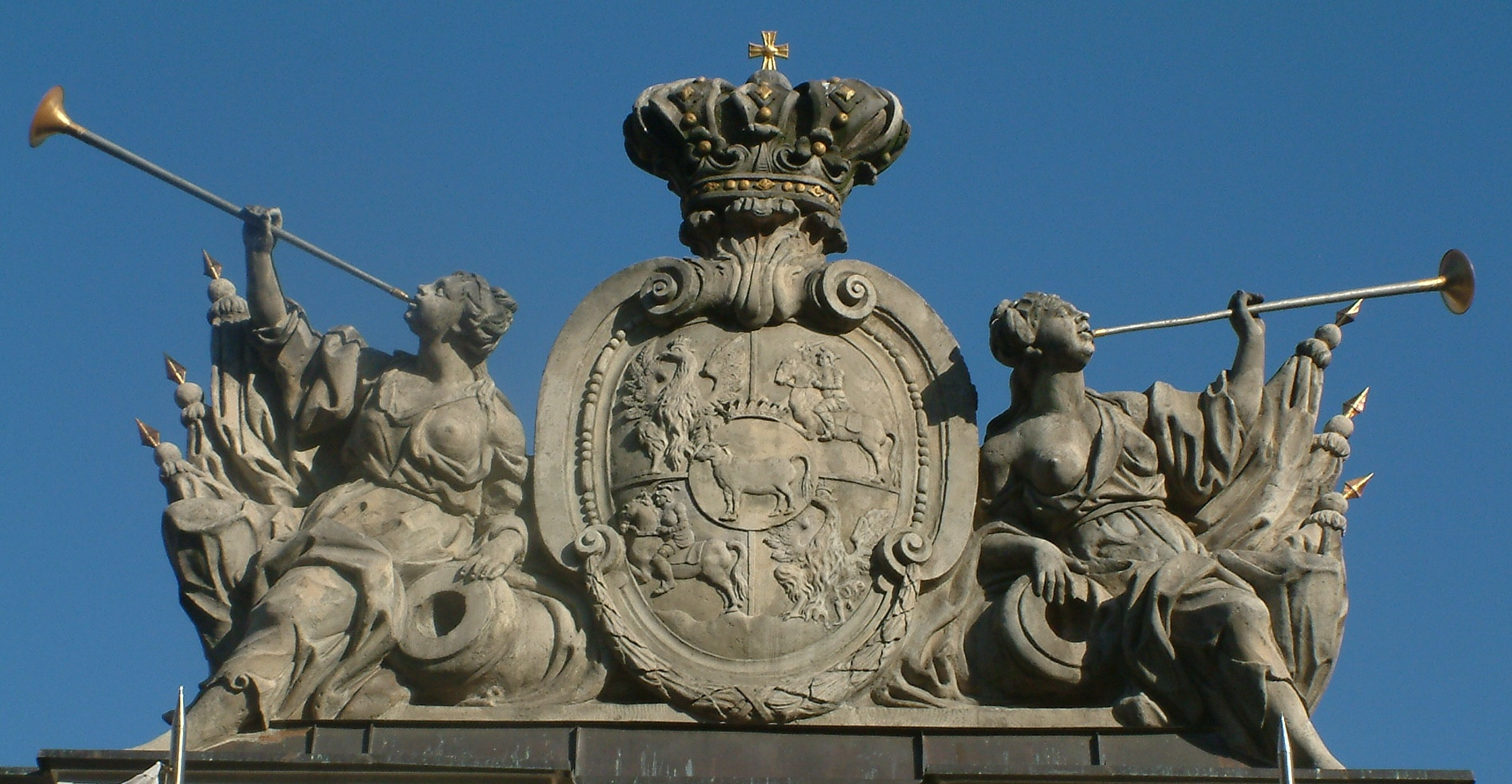
Coat of arms of Polish–Lithuanian Commonwealth from times of reign of Stanisław August Poniatowski, Guard House, Poznań

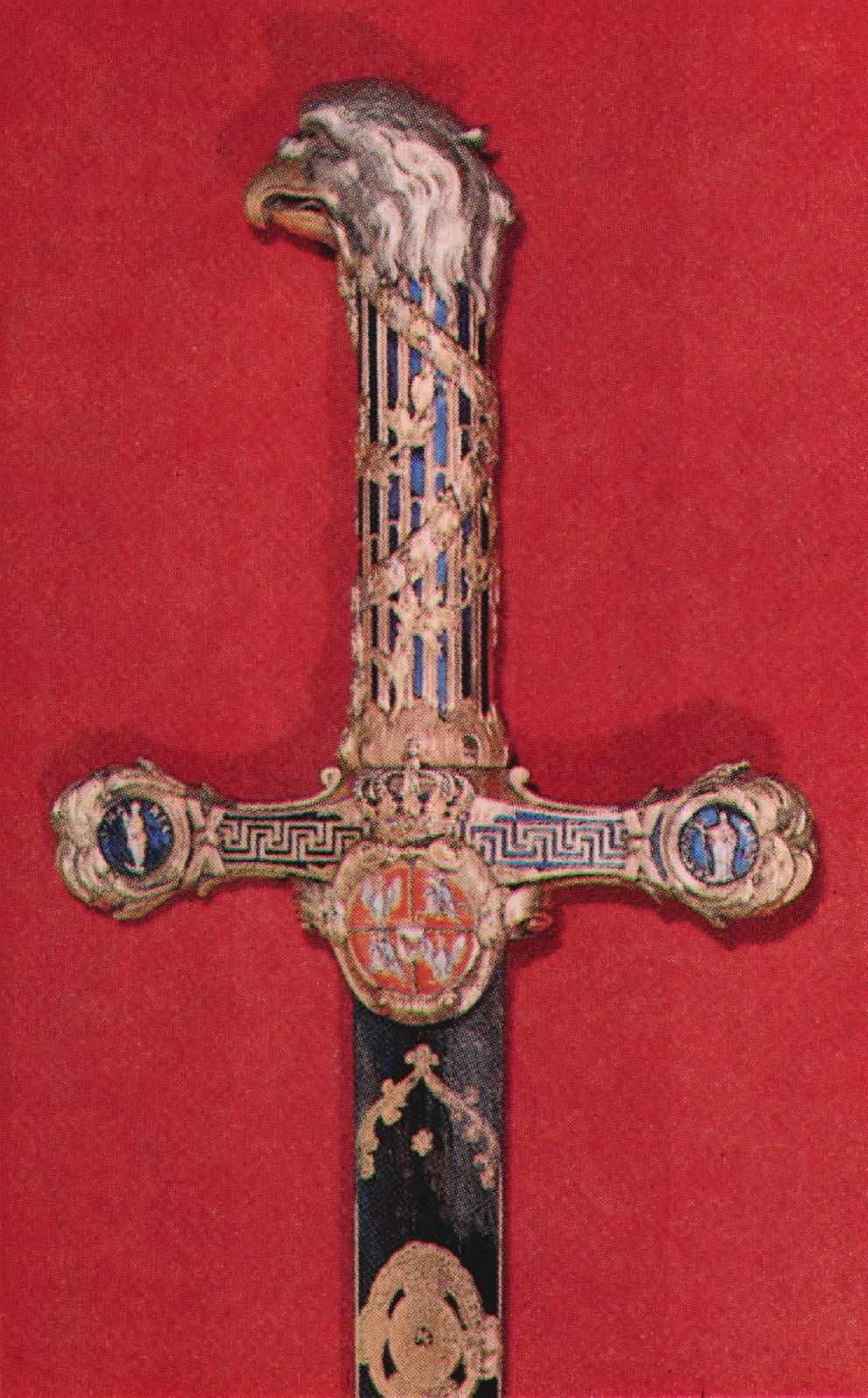
Ceremonial sword of King Stanisław August Poniatowski with his coat of arms

== Palaces ==
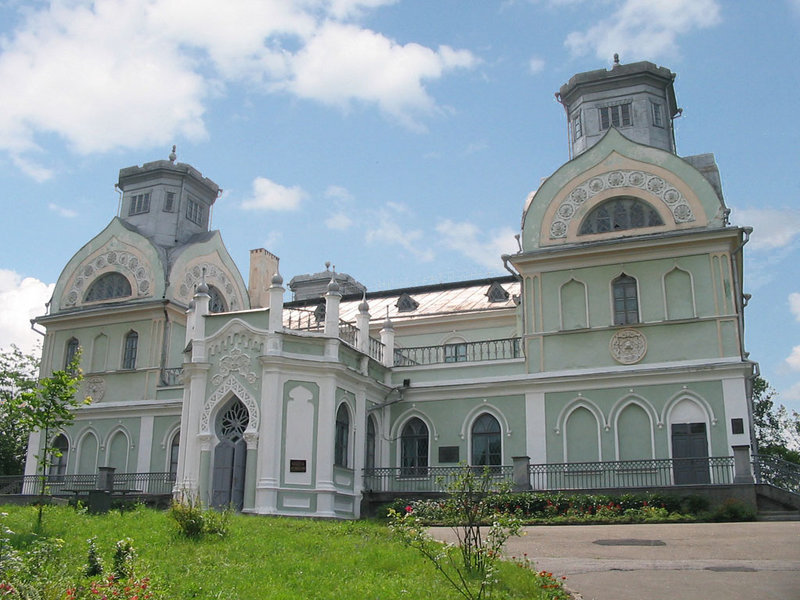
Palace in Korsuń Szewczenkowski

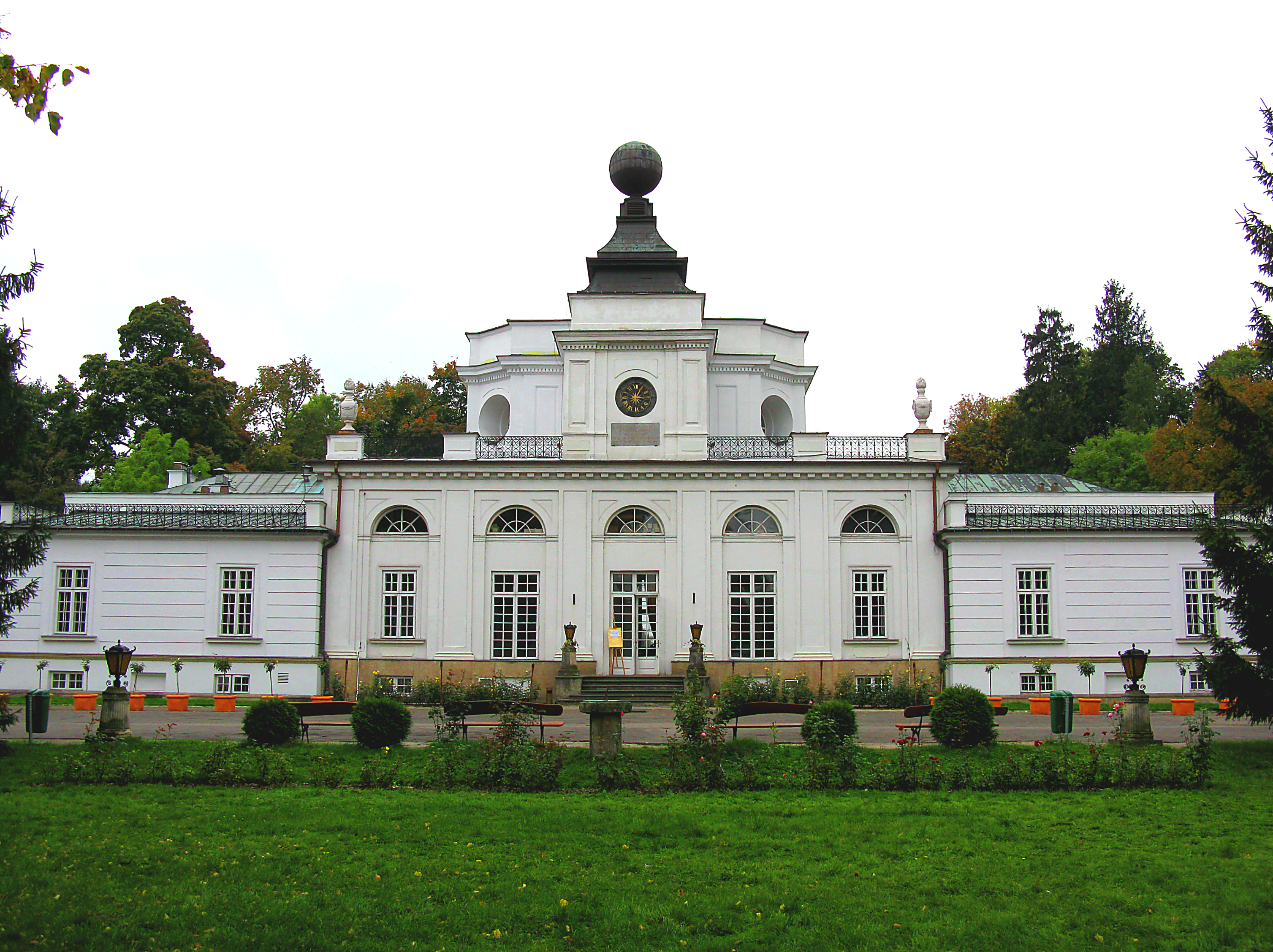
Jabłonna Palace in Jabłonna

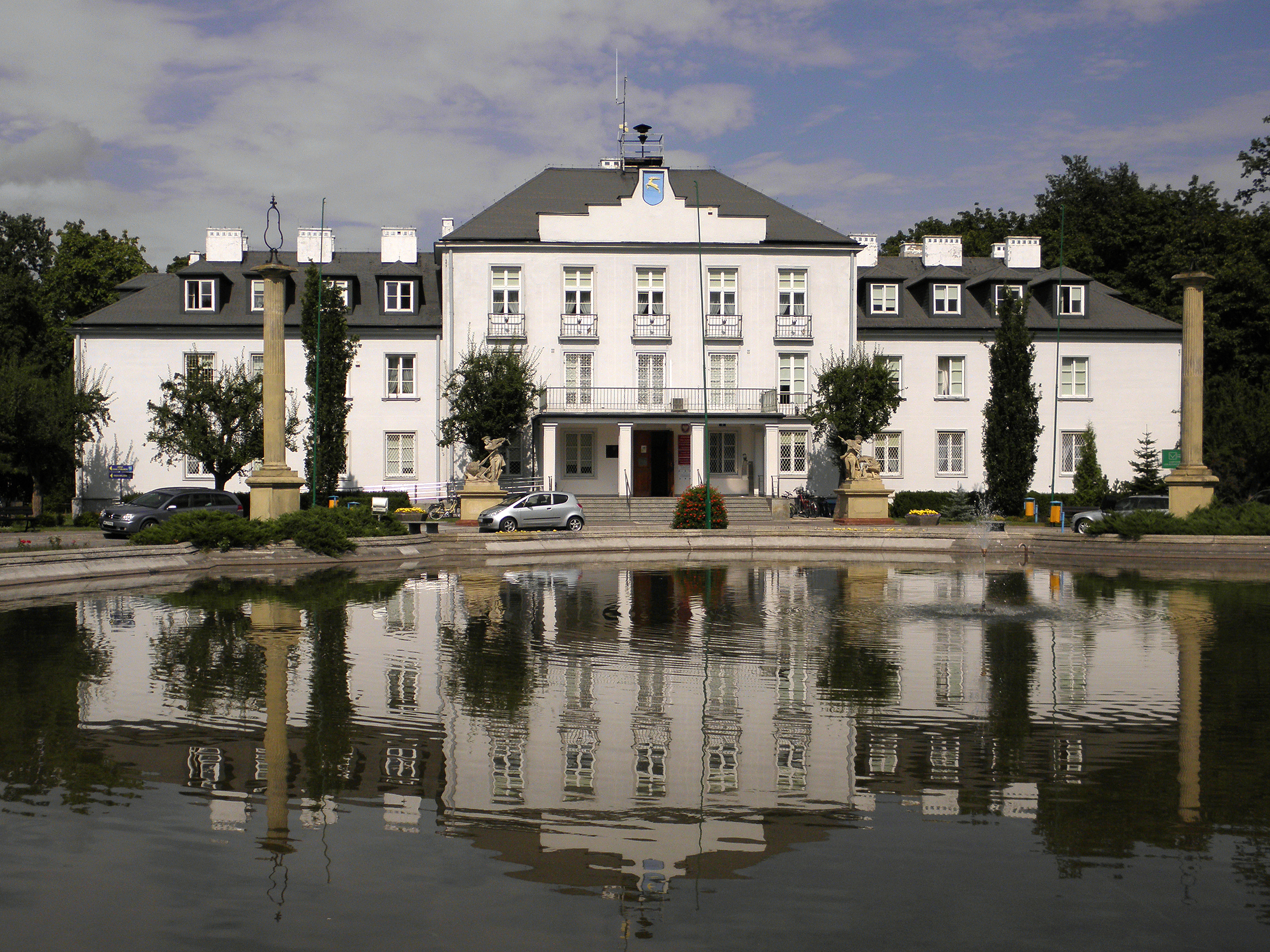
Palace in Kozienice

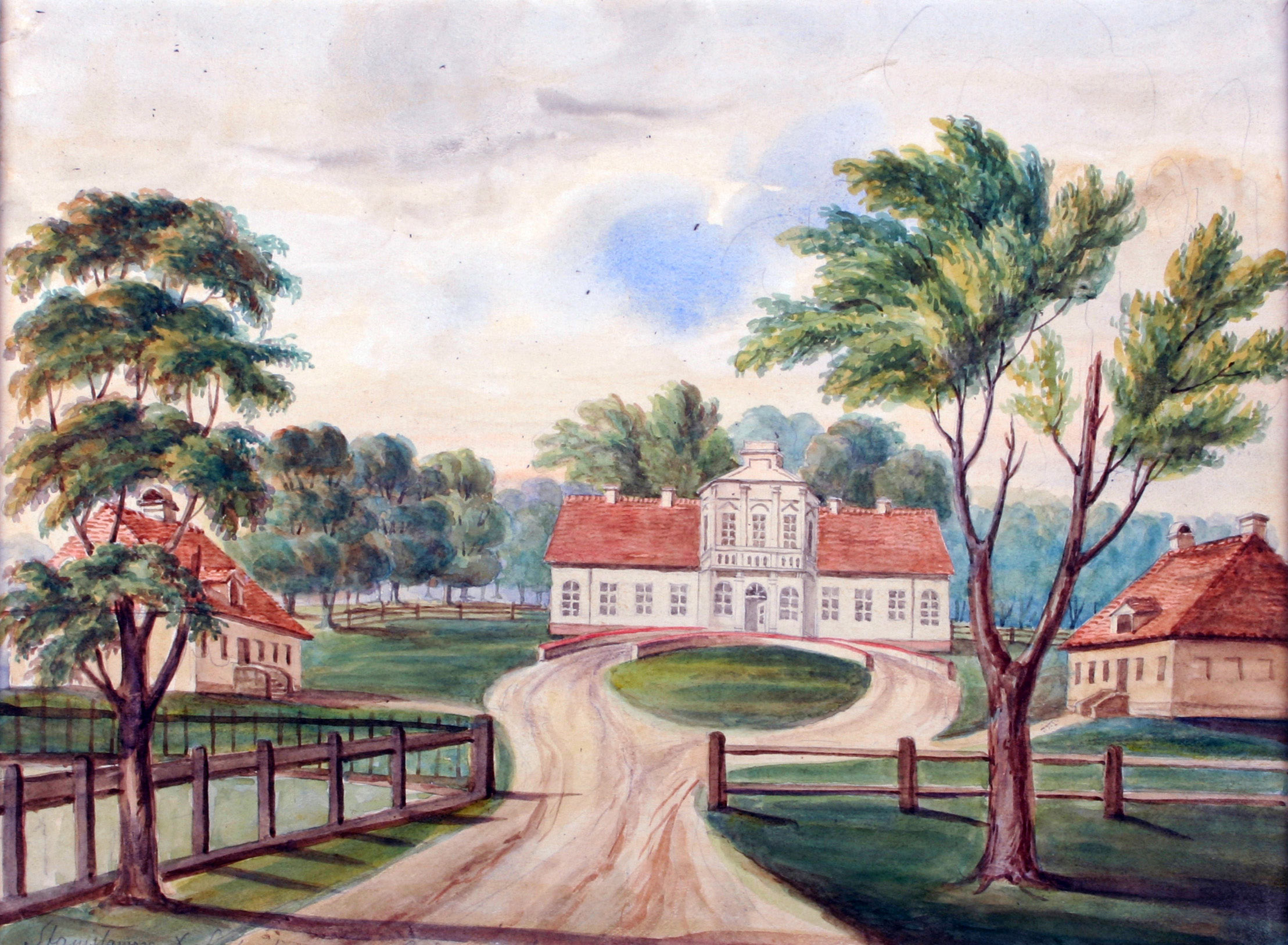
Manor house Stanisławówka in Grodno

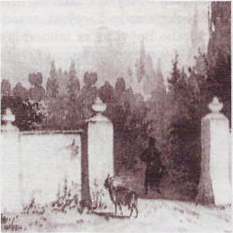
Ruins of the palace in Wołczyn

== See also ==
- Thursday Dinners
- No. 304 Polish Bomber Squadron im. Ks. Józefa Poniatowskiego"
