= Józef Michał Poniatowski =

Polish szlachcic, composer and operatic tenor (1916–1873)

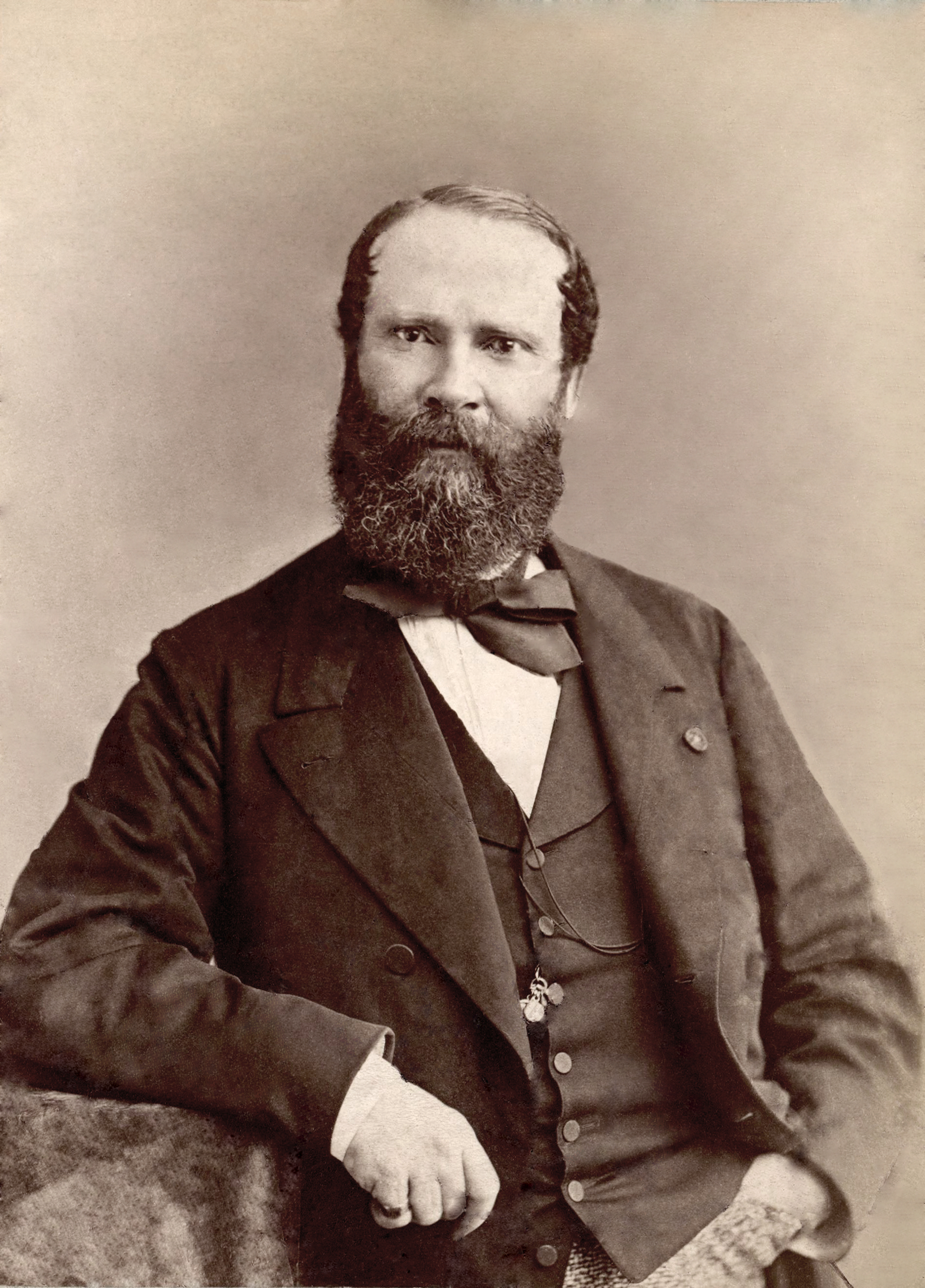

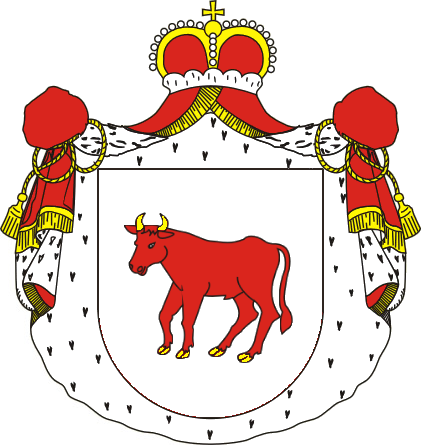
- Coat of arms: Ciołek
- Born: Giuseppe Michele Saverio Francesco Giovanni Luci; 24 July 1816; Rome, Papal States
- Died: 4 July 1873 (aged 58); Chislehurst, Kent, United Kingdom
- Family: Poniatowski
- Spouse: Matilda Perotti
- Issue: Stanisław August Poniatowski
- Father: Stanisław Poniatowski
- Mother: Cassandra Luci

Józef Michał Poniatowski (Rome, 24 July 1814 – London, 4 July 1873) was a Polish szlachcic, a composer and an operatic tenor. He was the nephew of the Polish general Prince Józef Antoni Poniatowski.

== Early life ==
Jozef Michal Poniatowski (Joseph Michael Xavier Francis John) was born Giuseppe Michele Saverio Francesco Giovanni Luci in Rome, the son of Stanisław Poniatowski and Cassandra Luci. He was legitimated as a son of Stanisław Poniatowski in 1847, and he became a naturalized Tuscan.

== Career ==
He studied music under Ceccherini in Florence. He wrote numerous operas for Italian and French theatres. Poniatowski was sent to Paris as plenipotentiary by Grand Duke Leopold II. He was created the 1st Conte di Monte Rotondo on 20 November 1847, and the first Principe di Monte Rotondo on 19 November 1850 by Grand Duke of Tuscany Leopold II.

In 1854, Napoleon III made him a senator and a naturalized French citizen.

== Personal life ==
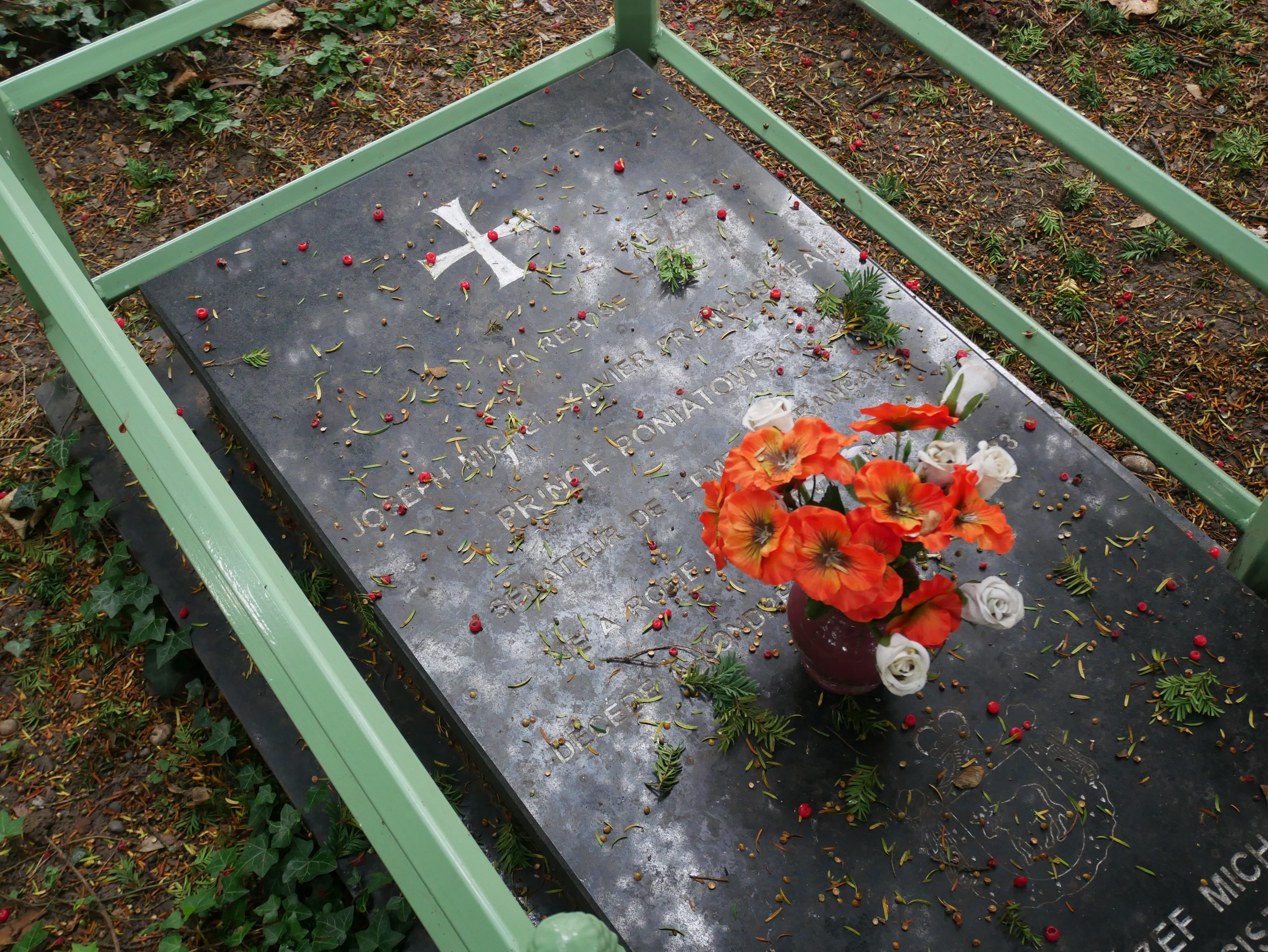
Poniatowski's grave in the churchyard of the Roman Catholic Church in Chislehurst

In 1834, he married Countess Matilda Perotti (1814–1875) at Florence. Together, they had one son who was born in Florence :

- Stanisław Stanislaus August Friedrich Józef Telemach Poniatowski (1835–1908), who married Louise Le Hon, biological daughter of Charles de Morny, Duke of Morny and Fanny Mosselman, Countess Le Hon.

Poniatowski died and was buried in Chislehurst, Kent in 1873.
