= Charles, Duc de Morny =

French statesman (1811–1865)

Charles
- Duc de Morny
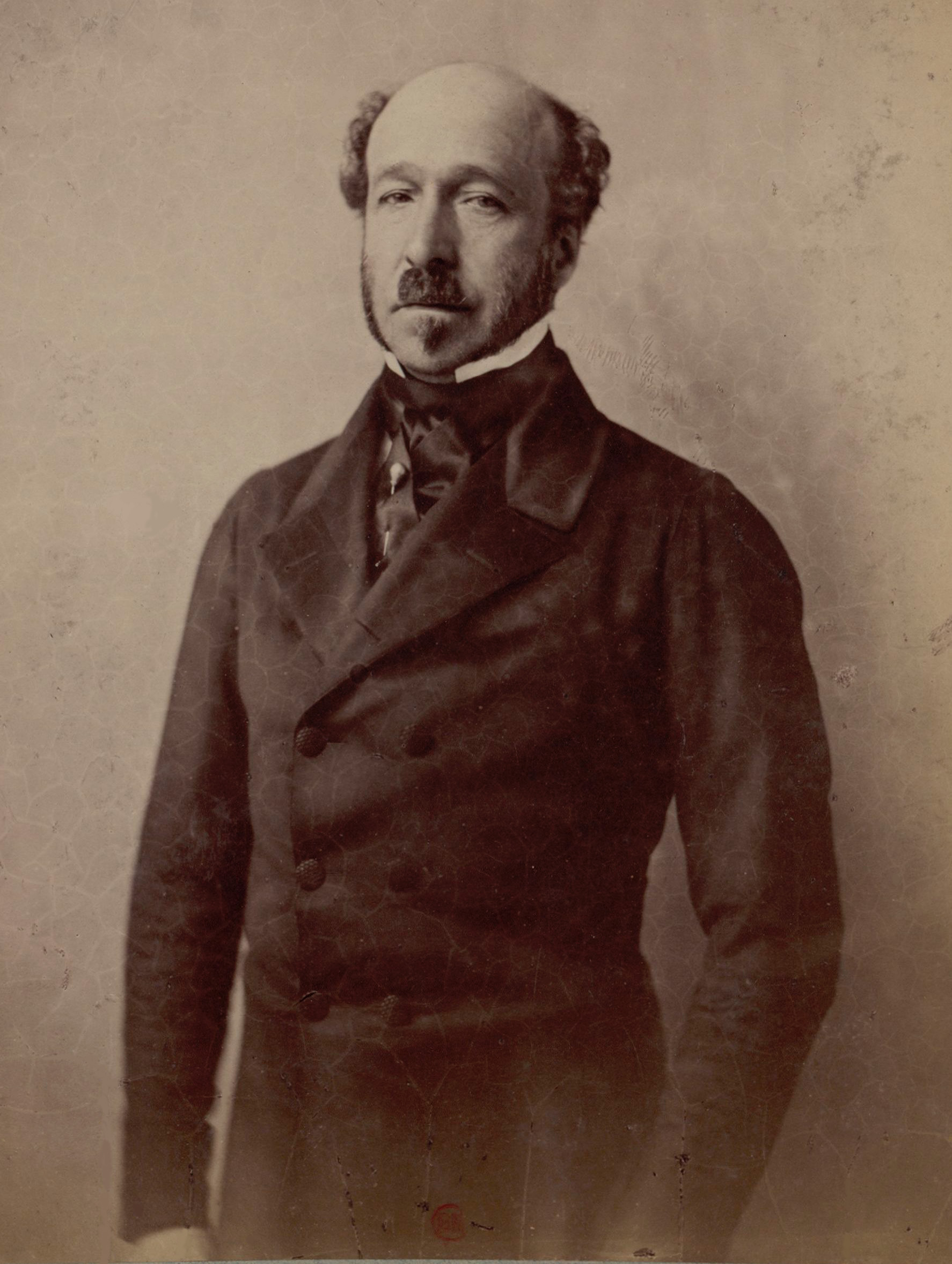
- Charles de Morny, c. 1860
- Born: 15 September 1811; Switzerland
- Died: 10 March 1865 (aged 53); Paris, France
- Spouse: Princess Sofia Sergeyevna Trubetskaya (m. 1857)
- Issue: Marie Eugenie de Morny, Countess of La Corzana; Auguste Charles, 2nd Duc de Morny; Serge de Morny; Mathilde de Morny; Louise Le Hon (illegitimate)
- Parents: Charles de Flahaut de La Billarderie, Comte de Flahaut (father); Hortense de Beauharnais (mother)

Charles Auguste Louis Joseph de Morny, 1st Duc de Morny (French pronunciation: [ʃaʁl oɡyst lwi ʒozɛf dəmɔʁni]; 15/16 September 1811 – 10 March 1865) was a French statesman.

== Biography ==
Morny was born in Switzerland, and was the extra-marital son of Hortense de Beauharnais (the wife of Louis Bonaparte and queen of Holland) and Charles, Comte de Flahaut, making him half-brother of Emperor Napoleon III and grandson of Empress Joséphine and Talleyrand. His birth was duly registered in a misleading certificate, which made him the legitimate son of Auguste Jean Hyacinthe Demorny, and born in Paris on 23 October 1811, and described as a landowner of Saint-Domingue. M. Demorny was in fact an officer in the Prussian army and a native of the French colony of St. Domingue (now Haiti), though he owned no land there or elsewhere.

Morny was educated by his grandmother, Adelaïde Filleul. After a brilliant school and college career the future Duc de Morny received a commission in the army, and the next year he entered the staff college. The Comte de Morny, as he was called by a polite fiction, served in Algeria in 1834–1835 (during the French conquest of Algeria) as aide-de-camp to General Camille Alphonse Trezel, whose life he saved under the walls of Constantine.

When Morny returned to Paris in 1838, he secured a solid position in the business world by establishing a major beet-sugar industry at Clermont-Ferrand in the Auvergne and by writing a pamphlet Sur la question des sucres in 1838. In these and other lucrative speculations he was helped by his mistress Françoise Mosselman, the beautiful and wealthy wife of the Belgian ambassador, Charles Aimé Joseph Le Hon, Comte Le Hon. Eventually there were few great commercial enterprises in Paris in which he did not have an interest.

Although Morny sat as deputy for Clermont-Ferrand from 1842 onwards, he took at first no important part in party politics, but he was heard with respect on industrial and financial questions. He supported the government of Louis Philippe, because revolution threatened his commercial interests, but before the Revolutions of 1848, by which he was temporarily ruined, he considered converting to the Bourbon legitimist cause represented by the Comte de Chambord. His attitude was expressed by the witticism with which he is said to have replied to a lady who asked what he would do if the Chamber were "swept out." "Range myself on the side of the broom handle," was his answer. Presently he was admitted to the intimate circle of his half-brother Louis Napoleon, and he helped to engineer the coup d'état of 2 December 1851 on the morrow of which he was appointed to head the ministry of the interior.

After six months in office, during which Morny showed his political opponents moderation and tact, he resigned his portfolio, ostensibly because he disapproved of the confiscation of the Bourbon-Orléans property but really because Napoleon, influenced by Morny's rivals, resented his claim to a foremost place in the government as a close relative of the House of Bonaparte. He then resumed his financial speculations. When in 1854 the Emperor appointed him president of the Corps Législatif, a position which he filled for the rest of his life, he used his official rank to assist his schemes.

In 1856, Morny was sent as special envoy to the coronation of Tsar Alexander II of Russia and brought home a wife, Princess Sophie Troubetzkoi, who through her connections greatly strengthened his social position. Sophie was legally the daughter of Prince Sergey Vasilyevich Trubetskoy, but may have been the illegitimate daughter of Nicholas I of Russia. In 1862, Morny was created a Duke. It is said that he aspired to the throne of Mexico, and that the French expedition sent to place Archduke Maximilian of Austria on the throne was prompted by Napoleon III's desire to thwart this ambition.

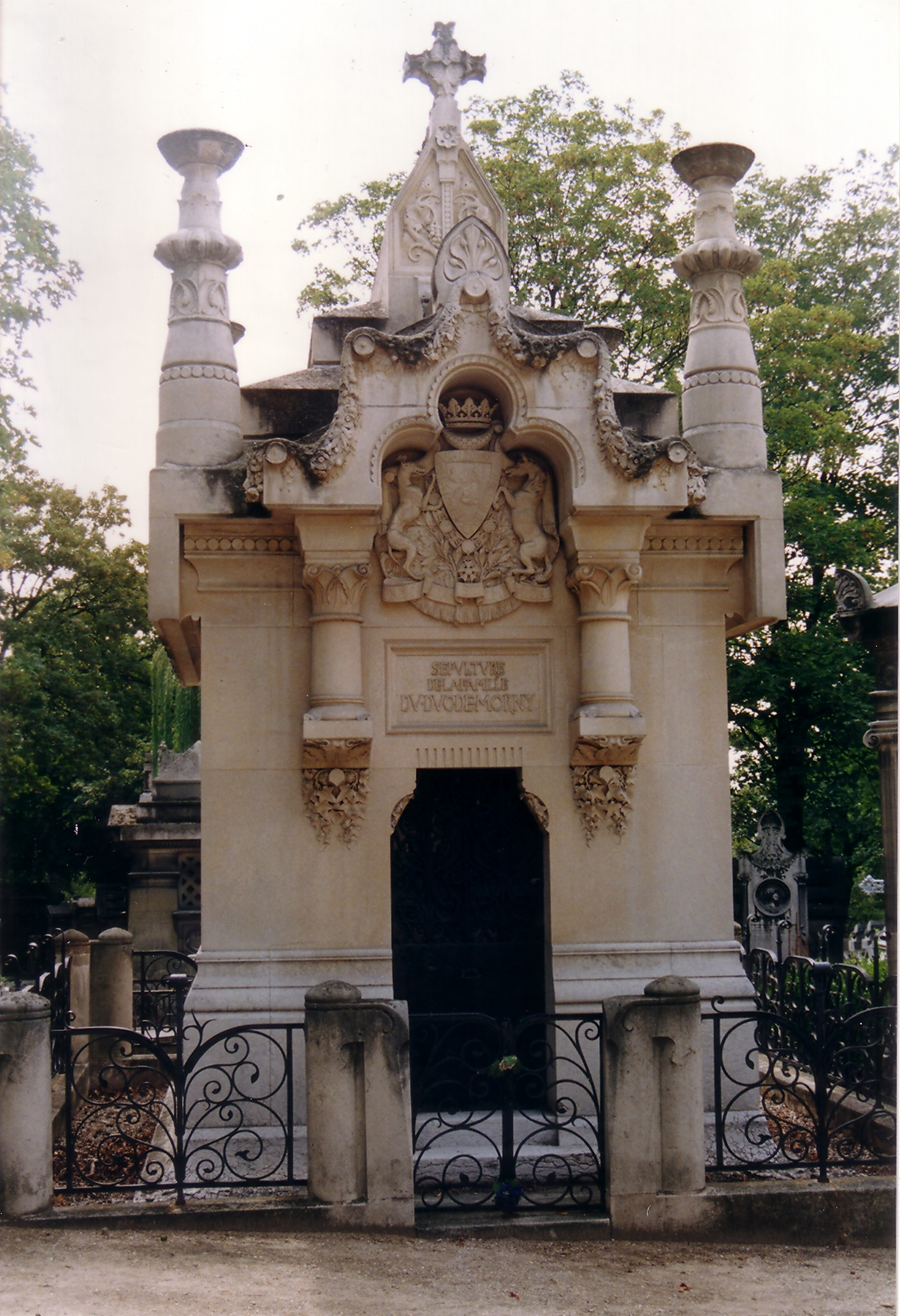
Tomb at the Père Lachaise Cemetery, Paris

In spite of occasional disagreements, Morny's influence with the emperor remained great, and the liberal policies which he advocated enabled him to serve the imperial cause through his influence with the leaders of the opposition, the most conspicuous of whom, Émile Ollivier, was detached from his colleagues by Morny's efforts. But while he was laying the foundations of the "Liberal Empire" his health deteriorated and was further injured by quack medicines. The emperor and the empress visited him just before his death in Paris on 10 March 1865.

Morny's valuable painting collection, including Jean-Honoré Fragonard's The Swing, was sold after his death. In spite of his undoubted wit and social gifts, Morny failed to secure the distinction he desired as a dramatist, and none of his pieces, which appeared under the pseudonym of M. de St Rémy, including Sur la grande route, M. Choufleuri restera chez lui le . . ., and the Les finesses du mari, among others, met with success on the stage.

M. de Chenneviėres, the director of the Beaux-Arts, admired Morny's taste in pictures as well as the man himself. Charles de Morny was, he opined, "the most perfectly polite, the most elegant, the best bred man of his time".

== Thoroughbred horse racing ==
Morny played an important role in the development of the thoroughbred horse racing and breeding industry in France. In 1860, he purchased the English Triple Crown champion West Australian and brought him to France for breeding purposes. In 1862 Morny built the Deauville-La Touques Race Course near Deauville. The Prix Morny is named in his honour.

== Contribution to French Orientalism ==
In 1832, the Count took the French Romantic painter Eugène Delacroix with him on a diplomatic mission to Tangier, exposing the artist to life outside of cloudy, overcast Paris. Over the course of his six months in North Africa, Delacroix executed a number of pencil and watercolor sketches in seven notebooks, which led to two dozens of oil masterpieces, depicting the Moroccan architecture, landscape, and people, which served as artistic inspiration for the remainder of his career.

== Family ==
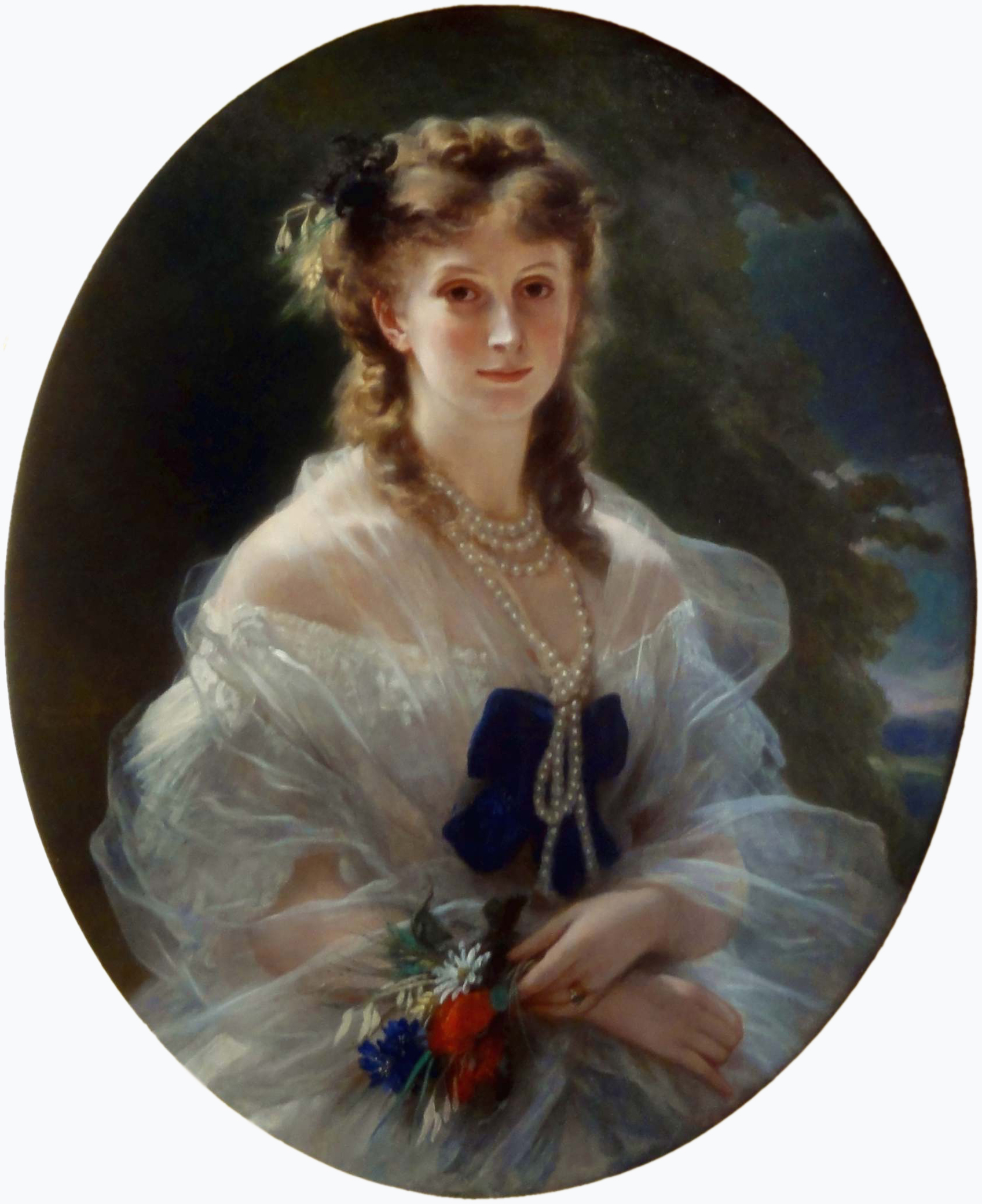
Sofia Trubetskaya, Duchess of Morny

He had married at Saint Petersburg on 7 January 1857, Princess Sofia Sergeyevna Trubetskaya (Moscow, 25 March 1836 – 8 August 1898), the only daughter of Prince Sergey Vasilyevich Trubetskoy (1814 – 12 May (30 April Old Style), 1859) and his wife Ekaterina Petrovna Mussina-Pushkina (1 February 1816 – c. 1897). Their children included:

- Marie Eugenie de Morny (1857–1883), who married a Spanish noble, José Ramón Gil Francisco de Borja Nicolás Osório y de Heredia, 9th Conde de La Corzana (1854–1919), in 1877 in Madrid, and had a son:
  - José Osorio y de Morny (Madrid, 1878 – Madrid, 1905). He married María de la Purificación Dorticos-Marín y León, Marquesa de Marín (1878–1928), in 1902 in Madrid. He had children.
- Auguste Charles Louis Valentin de Morny (1859–1920), who succeeded his father as the 2nd Duc de Morny. He married Carlota de Guzmán-Blanco y de Ybarra (Caracas, 1869 – Courbevoie, 1939) in 1886 in Paris and had three children:
  - Auguste de Morny, 3rd Duc de Morny (1889–1935), unmarried and without issue.
  - Antoine de Morny, 4th Duc de Morny (1896–1943), unmarried and without issue.
  - Anna Teresa de Morny (1890–1924), unmarried and without issue.
- Serge de Morny (1861–1922), who died unmarried and without issue.
- Sophie Mathilde (Missy) de Morny (1863–1944), who married Jacques Godart, 6th Marquis de Belbeuf (1850–1906) in 1881 in Madrid and divorced him in 1903; without issue.

He also had an illegitimate daughter by Fanny Mosselman, who was referred by Honoré de Balzac.

- Leopoldina Louise le Hon (ca. 1840-1931) married the Polish prince Stanislas-Auguste Poniatowski, of the Royal House of Poniatowski, and had children. Louise has living descendants.

== Theatrical interests ==
De Morny was influential in the early career of Sarah Bernhardt, who played for Alexandre Dumas and Victor Hugo. In her autobiography, My Double Life, Bernhardt recounts that at a family conference which de Morny attended as a family friend, the purpose of which was to determine what Bernhardt was to do with her future life, de Morny suggested that she be sent to the Conservatoire. The family took him up on the suggestion and her life turned to the theatre.
