= Fanny Mosselman =

Belgian noble and salonist (1808–1880)

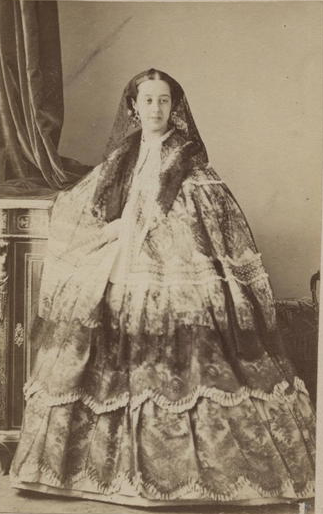

Françoise Zoé Mathilde Mosselman (1808–1880), known as Fanny Mosselman, was a Belgian noble and salonist, known as the maîtresse en titre (official mistress) of the duke Charles de Morny.

== Life ==
Daughter of the rich Belgian banker and captain of industry François-Dominique Mosselman and his wife Louise Tacqué, she was from a family with several business interests in Belgium, most notably the Vieille-Montagne mines. Her father had bought a hôtel particulier in the Chaussée-d'Antin from the bankrupt banker Récamier, husband of Juliette. After 1830 it became the residence of the first Belgian envoy, Charles Le Hon.

In 1827 she married Charles Le Hon who was made a Belgian count in 1836, so she also held the title of comtesse Le Hon or Lehon. Nominally, they had three children - Eugène (born 1828) and Léopold (born 1832), the latter being supposed to be the son of her lover, the diplomat Charles-Joseph Bresson) - and Louise (born 1838) (Louise was fathered by Charles de Morny illegitimate son of Hortense de Beauharnais).

Fanny took several lovers, amongst them (so it is said) the duc d'Orléans and held an extremely brilliant salon in Paris, attended by politicians, members of the July Monarchy royal family, journalists and writers - Balzac called her "Iris in light blue, the golden-haired ambassadress", whilst Charles de Rémusat commented "She had the spirit of a grand grisette, with a certain intelligence for affairs and intrigue"

Around 1833, she met Charles de Morny, then a mere sous-lieutenant, but who occupied a position in high society as the illegitimate son of général de Flahaut and queen Hortense, duchess of Saint-Leu, and grandson of Talleyrand. Fernand de Montguyon took him to a reception at the Belgian embassy, where he and Fanny immediately fell in love and began a 25-year liaison.

In the words of one historian, "Fanny chose a man over whom she had great influence and who allowed her freedom of movement and especially freedom to follow her heart".

Her daughter Louise married Józef Stanisław Poniatowski.

== Parisian residences ==
- 1831-1838 : Hotel Recamier, Chaussée d'Antin
- 1838-1843 : Hotel de la Vaupaliere, rue du Faubourg-Saint-Honoré
- from 1843 : Hotel Le Hon, rond-point des Champs-Élysées

== Bibliography ==
- Carlo Bronne, La comtesse Le Hon et la première ambassade de Belgique à Paris, Brussels, 1951
