= Charles Le Hon =

Belgian politician

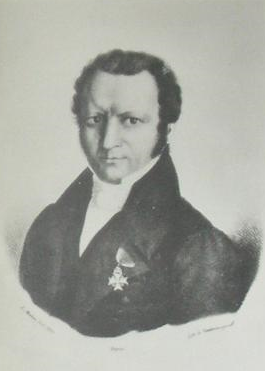
- Charles Le Hon
- Born: Charles Aimé Joseph Le Hon; 10 January 1792; Tournai, Belgium
- Died: 30 April 1868 (aged 76); Paris, France
- Occupations: politician, lawyer, industrialist

Count Charles Aimé Joseph Le Hon (10 January 1792 – 30 April 1868) was a Belgian liberal politician.

== Life ==
Originally a lawyer and industrialist, he served as mayor of Tournai and was elected a deputy in the House of Representatives of the Netherlands during the Dutch period, then to the National Congress of Belgium in 1830, having been one of the makers of the establishment of the Belgian monarchy that year. After the election of Louis, Duke of Nemours on 3 July 1832, he formed part of the delegation of deputies sent to Paris to offer the young prince the crown. He then served as Leopold I of Belgium's ambassador to France and deputy to the Belgian Chamber of Representatives. He was made a minister of state in 1856.

He married Fanny Mosselman, daughter of François-Dominique Mosselman and of Louise Tacqué. Notable descendants of the Mosselman family, include queen Paola of the Belgians and her children.
