= Misty (name) =

Misty is a feminine given name of English origin. It is based on the English word mist.

== Given name or nickname ==
- Misty C. Bentz (born 1980), American astrophysicist and professor
- Misty Blowers, American computer scientist
- Misty Buscher, American politician
- Misty Copeland (born 1982), American ballerina
- Misty Dawn (born 1963), adult film actress
- Misty Edwards (born 1979), American contemporary Christian musician
- Misty Hyman (born 1979), American swimmer
- Misty Jean (born c. 1980), Haitian singer and former Miss West Indies
- Misty Jenkins Australian scientist
- Misty Keasler (born 1978), American photographer
- Misty Lee (born 1976), American professional magician
- Misty Lown, American dance teacher
- Misty Massey, American fantasy author
- Misty May-Treanor (born 1977), American professional beach volleyball player
- Misty Oldland (born 1966), British-Swiss singer-songwriter
- Misty Phoenix, French drag queen
- Misty Plowright (born 1983), American politician
- Misty Rain, an American pornographic actress, director and exotic dancer
- Mistella Misty Rowe (born 1950), American actress
- Misty Sato, New Zealand academic
- Misty Blue Simmes (born 1959), American former professional wrestler
- Misty Snow (born 1985), American politician
- Misty Stone (born 1986), American pornographic actress and model
- Misty Talley, American film director
- Misty Thomas (born 1964), Canadian basketball player
- Misty Upham (1982–2014), Native American actress
- Misty Van Popta, Canadian politician
- Moda Fincher (1924–2006), radio announcer

== See also ==
- Missy
