= Palacio del Marqués de Alcañices =

Coordinates: 40.4182°N 3.6947°W

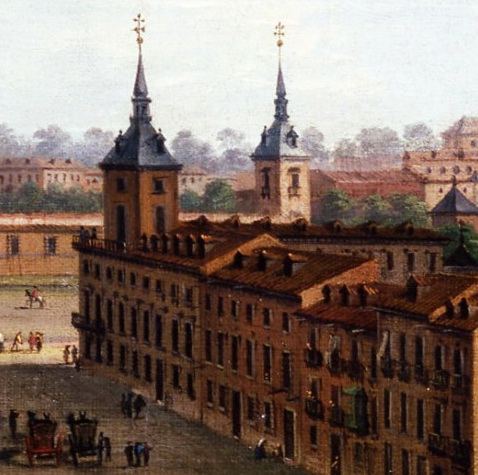
Palacio de los Alcañices from the opposite perspective of Puerta de Alcalá in the now Gran Vía, painted by Antonio Joli, between 1750 and 1754.

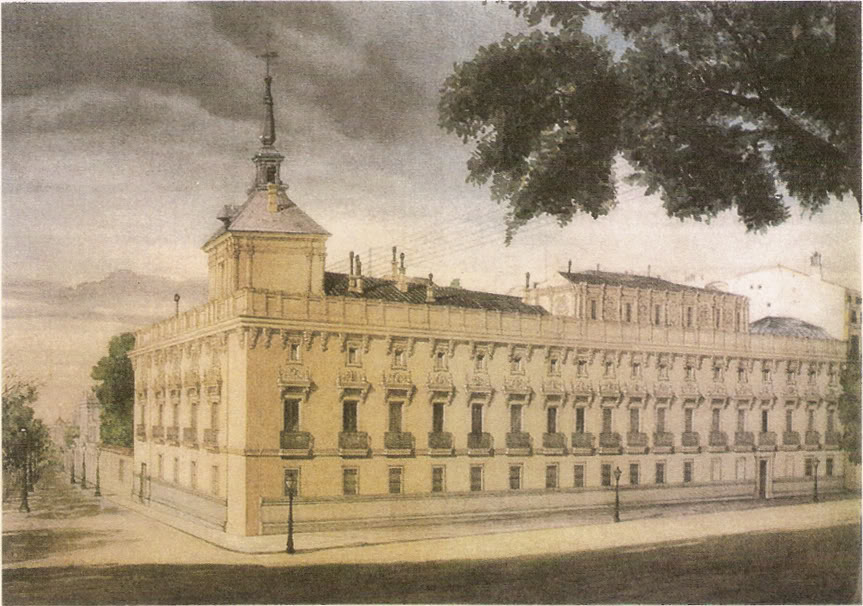
Palacio de Alcañices (c. 1880s) by Juan José Zapater Rodríguez.

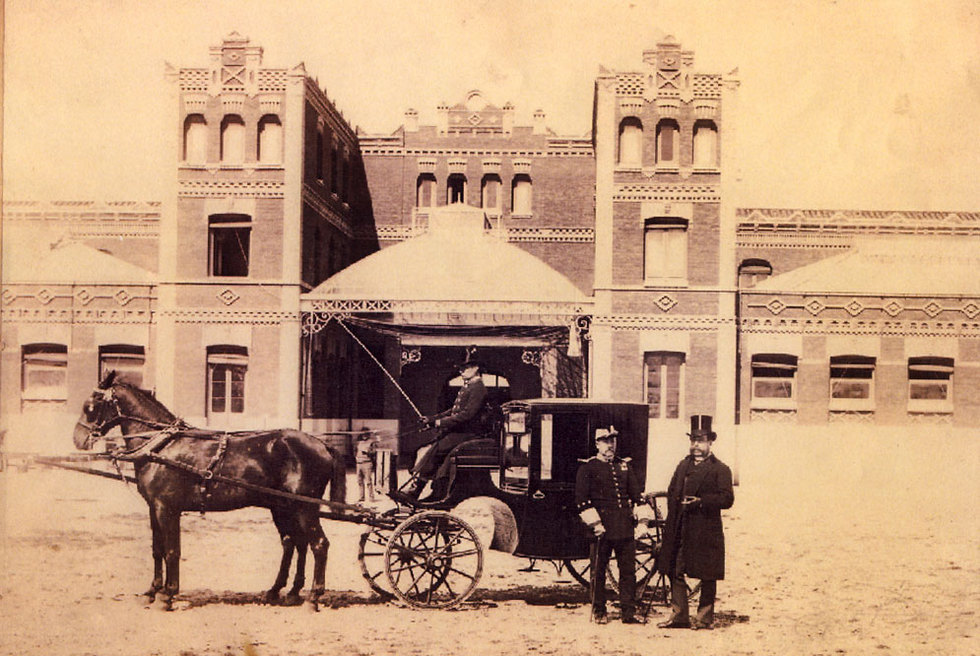
The Marquess of Alcañices and the Marquis of Sotomayor in front of the stables of Palacio de los Alcañices of Madrid, 19th century.

The Palacio del Marqués de Alcañices, also known as Palacio de Alcañices (or Palacio de los Alcañices), was a building, now disappeared, which was located in the Calle de Alcalá of Madrid on the land that was other building that occupied Luis Méndez de Haro 6th Marquis del Carpio, a favorite of Philip IV. It belonged to the parish of San Sebastián, and occupied the number 74 of the modern numbering of the street; its other façade bordering the Paseo del Prado. Was named after its owners, the last one José Osorio y Silva, mentor of Alfonso XIII, known as Pepe Osorio and the Grand Duke of Sesto, who also held the title of Marquess of Alcañices, among others.

It was sold in 1882 on the occasion of the works of extension of the calles Zorrilla and de los Madrazo, and today in part of the land that occupied the palace rises the building the Bank of Spain.

== History ==
The first data of the building, indicate that it was built in the 17th century by Luis Méndez de Haro 6th Marquis del Carpio, nephew of Gaspar de Guzmán y Pimentel Ribera y Velasco de Tovar, better known as Count-Duke of Olivares. Luis Méndez de Haro, became a favorite of Philip IV with the disgrace of his uncle. Subsequently, the building was inhabited by the year 1790, by the Dukes of Béjar, Pedro de Alcántara Téllez-Girón y Beaufort Spontin and Maria Josefa Pimentel, although this was of very transient form, knowing that this couple took preferably other palaces added to its main entails, such as those of Leganitos, las Vistillas or Cuesta de la Vega. It will be the end of the 18th century when the property was acquired by Manuel Miguel Osorio y Spinola, 15th Marquess of Alcañices. It began to be used with its gardens by the nobility as a rest area, a process that was accentuated by the construction of the Buen Retiro Palace, which was almost opposite. With this in mind, the favorite of the king who built the Buen Retiro it built his own residence as close as possible to that of his lord.

Due to the poor condition of the building, the Marquis of Alcañices, makes a first work of improvement in the early 19th century. At the time of Alcañices, which will give the final name to the palace, between the visitors are Isidro González Velázquez, Guesdon, Parcerisa, Clifford, Laurent, etc. Starting mid-century reflects little variations only important in the gardens as long as changing according to the tastes of the moment, and the last time, for example in the plan of Íbero of 1875, appears entirely English, no trace of the early parterres. In 1823 dies Manuel Miguel Osorio y Spinola and the property is inherited by his son Nicolás Osorio y Zayas, who carried out a major reform in 1847 to invest the amount of 2 reales.

Nicolás Osorio y Zayas was a big fan of horses, one of the founders of the Society for the Promotion of Horse breeding in Spain. In 1854 it built new stables at the Palace. He died in January 1866 passing the property to his son José Osorio y Silva, Duke of Sesto. José Osorio y Silva, in 1872, makes a new reform of the Palace ordering the work to Francisco de Cubas y González-Montes, better known today as Marquis of Cubas, after the Duke marriage to Princess Sofia Sergeyevna Trubetskaya, and also due to the political role played by the marriage in the Bourbon Restoration; inhabited by the Dukes of Sesto, the palace became the center of the Alfonsine meetings.

It is striking that just as the origin of the palace itself is paralleled with the Palacio de Lerma-Medinaceli, this too, like that, acquired its most elegant and refined appearance just a few years before its destruction. During this period the palace lived certainly more its period most intense, particularly court of the Duke and his wife, the princess Sofia Sergeyevna Trubetskaya.

The cost of supporting the monarchy, from the Duke of Sesto, calculated between 15 and 20 million, and the works of extension of the old streets of del Sordo and de la Greda, today calls Zorrilla and de los Madrazo, forced the Duke of Sesto to sell the Palace in 1882 to the board of the Bank of Spain. It demolished this building and now the site is occupied by the huge headquarters building of the Bank of Spain which the construction of the latter building started in 1884, that originally occupying not only the plot of the palace, but neighboring buildings; It took the opportunity to expand the street calle de la Greda, on whose property the Bank of Spain paid the price for some three million pesetas.

== Gallery ==
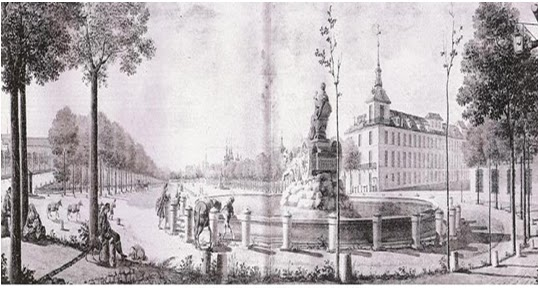
Old stamp of the Paseo del Prado with the Palacio de los Alcañices.

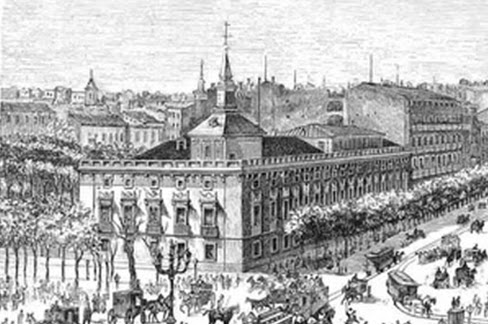
Palacio de los Alcañices. Ilustración Española y Americana. (c. 19th c.)

== Bibliography ==
- Juan Antonio Carmona Pidal (2001). Landlord aristocracy and agrarian change in the Spain of the 19th century . La Casa de Alcañices. Ávila: Junta de Castilla y León. ISBN 84-9718-016-X.
