= Abbey of Santa Engracia =

Monastery in Zaragoza, Spain

Coordinates: 41.6489°N 0.8829°W

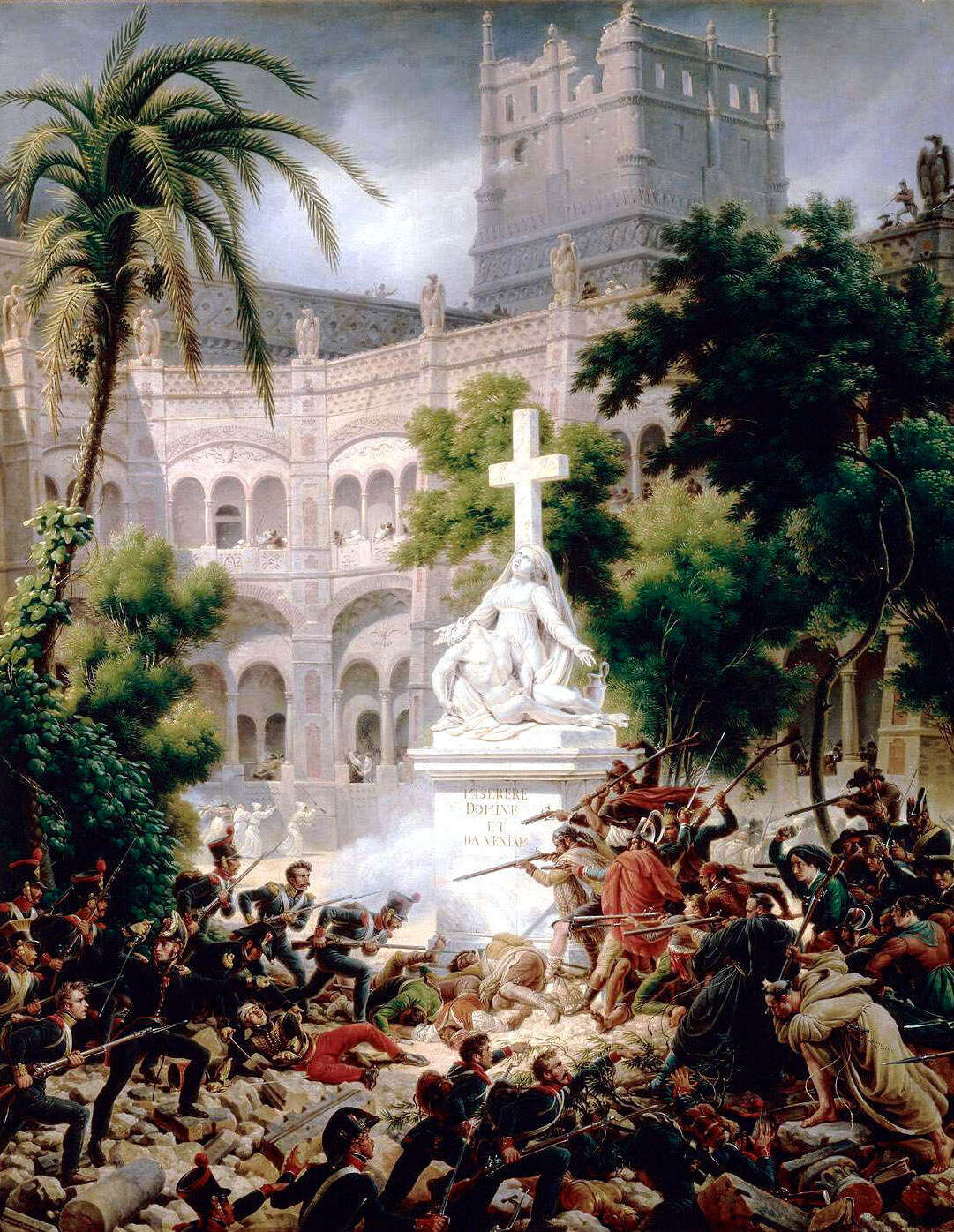
French troops assaulting the abbey during the 1809 siege of Zaragoza

The Abbey of Santa Engracia (Spanish: Real Monasterio de Santa Engracia) was a monastery in Zaragoza, Aragon, Spain, established to house the relics of Saint Engratia and the many martyrs of Zaragoza. The date of 392 was traditionally claimed as a foundation date, which was linked with the travels of Saint Paulinus. The church was believed to have been sited on the spot of the martyrdom of Engratia.

Today only the crypt and part of the façade remain and are preserved in the Church of Santa Engracia de Zaragoza. The monastery was destroyed during the two sieges of Zaragoza (1808 and 1809) conducted by French troops during the Peninsular War. However, the upper cloister survived, but was demolished in 1836. The monastery was noted for its rich Isabelline and Renaissance architecture.

== History ==
After the Peace of Constantine an abbey was built over the tomb in the cemetery of the Martyrs. There are some who attribute its foundation to Saint Paulinus during his pilgrimage to Zaragoza in 392. The monks may have initially followed the Rule of St. Augustine, before adopting the Benedictine Rule. The monastery flourished in 7th century; two illustrious prelates came from there: Eugenius II of Toledo and John of Zaragoza. Braulio of Zaragoza, succeeded his brother John and further supported and protected the abbey. The monks continued at the under Muslim rule.

In the Synod of Jaca (1063), Bishop Paterno of Zaragoza, with express consent of its clergy, ceded to the bishopric of Huesca the monastery and church of Santa Engracia and Holy Mass. This was reiterated in a bull in 1121 by Pope Gregory VII. As a diocesan establishment the position filled by a prior for four centuries, took the name of archdeacon.

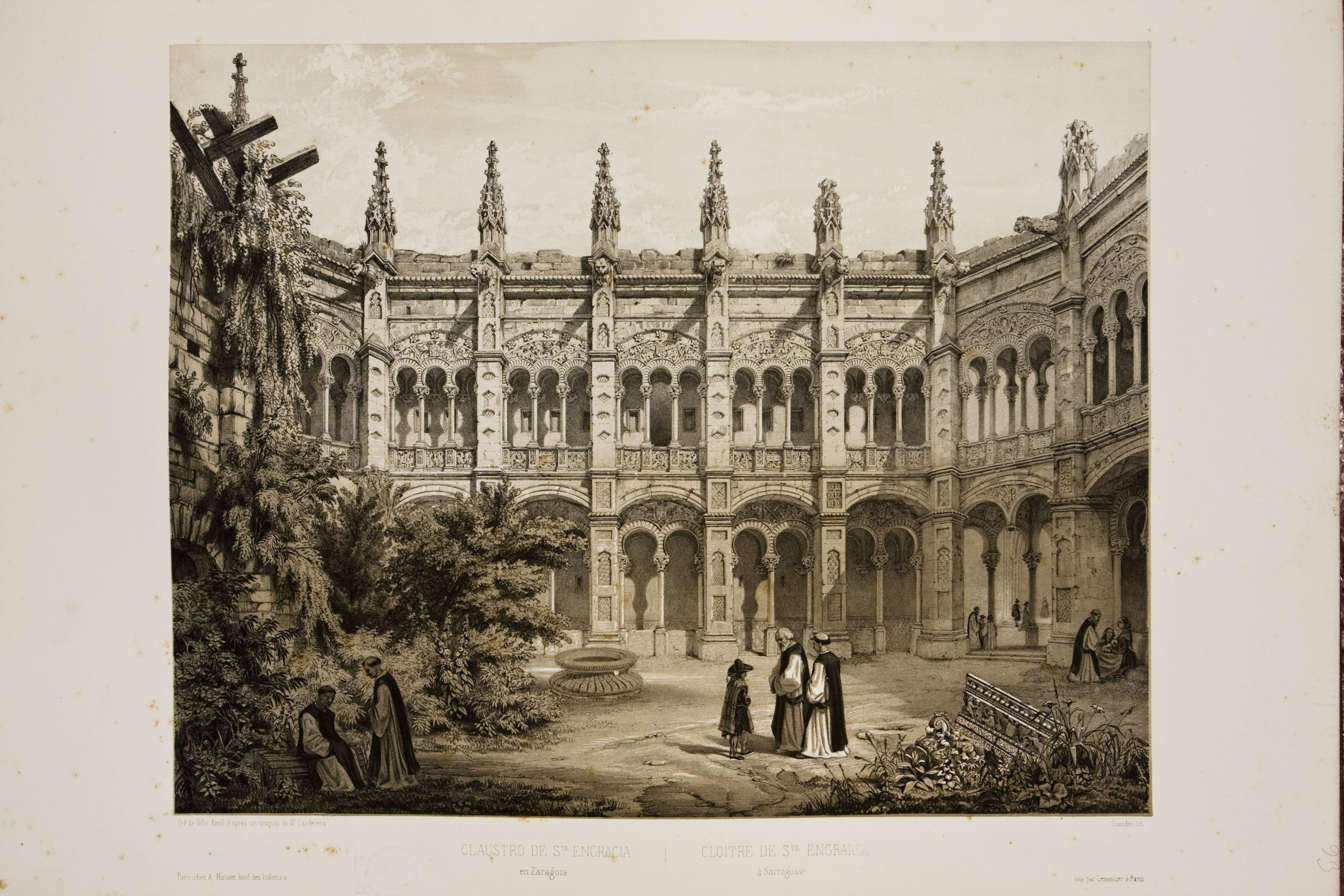
Santa Engracia, the upper cloister. Drawing by Jenaro Pérez Villaamil and Alfred Guesdon in 1834. Most of this cloister survived the French Sieges (see last image).

An excavation in 1389 discovered the bodies Saint Engratia and Lupercus, in two niches within a mound of stone with their names inscribed which may have been placed there by Mozarabs who re-buried them again. Devotion to the Saint Engratia increased as a result of the gratitude of King John II of Aragon "the Great" who attributed the healing of his cataracts to the miraculous nail of her martyrdom. He bequeathed to his son Ferdinand II of Aragon the obligation to restore the monastery. Ferdinand founded a monastery of Hieronymite monks there. In 1493, Saint Engratia's day when the monks took possession and the divine services were held in presence of Ferdinand and Queen Isabella.

The building was restored around 1755 by Biscayan architect Juan Morlanes, work financed by the payment of 2,500 ducats of Don Clemente Sánchez de Orellana y Riofrío, a native from the city of Quito, which corresponded to a price established by the award of the Vicecounty of Antizana of (750 ducats) and the Marquisate of Villa de Orellana of (1,500 ducats)

With the course of time much of the Gothic building was renovated but the primitive and modern all perished on the night of August 14, 1808 as a result of the terrible explosions that shook Zaragoza as the hosts of Napoleon commenced a second siege.

== Architecture ==
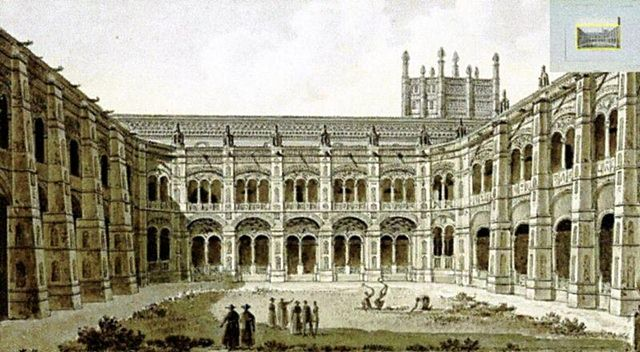
The lower cloister of Santa Engracia before the French sieges. Painting by Louis-François Baron Lejeune.

One of the most famous monuments of this church was the altarpiece and the chapel of the Vicechancellor of Aragon Antonio Agustín, father of the Archbishop of Tarragona of the same name, which work was executed with great care by famous Berruguete. Collateral to the Agustin sepulcher was that of the famous writer and analyst Jerónimo de Zurita, whose epitaph read:

HlERONlMO ZURITAE MlCHAELlS F. GABRIELIS N. CE-
SAR -AUGUSTANO HISTORIAE ARAGONAE DILIGEN-
TÍSIMO AC ELECTO SCRIPTORI. PATRI B. M.
HIERONIMUS F. POSSUIT. VISIT ANNOS
LXVII. MENSIS XI OBIIT CESARAUGSTAE III NON. NOVEMB. MDLXX.

The cloister had a grand gallery consisting of large columns of marble and ornate sculptures and paintings by masters of great merit. Here was the sepulcher of the chronicler of Aragon, Jerónimo de Blancas, who died on December 11, 1590. The painting of the main altarpiece and other church paintings were by Francisco Bayeu. All that remained was the famous façade of marble and alabaster whose Plateresque style appears to be work by Diego Morlanes, son of Juan, the original sculptor.

== Gallery ==
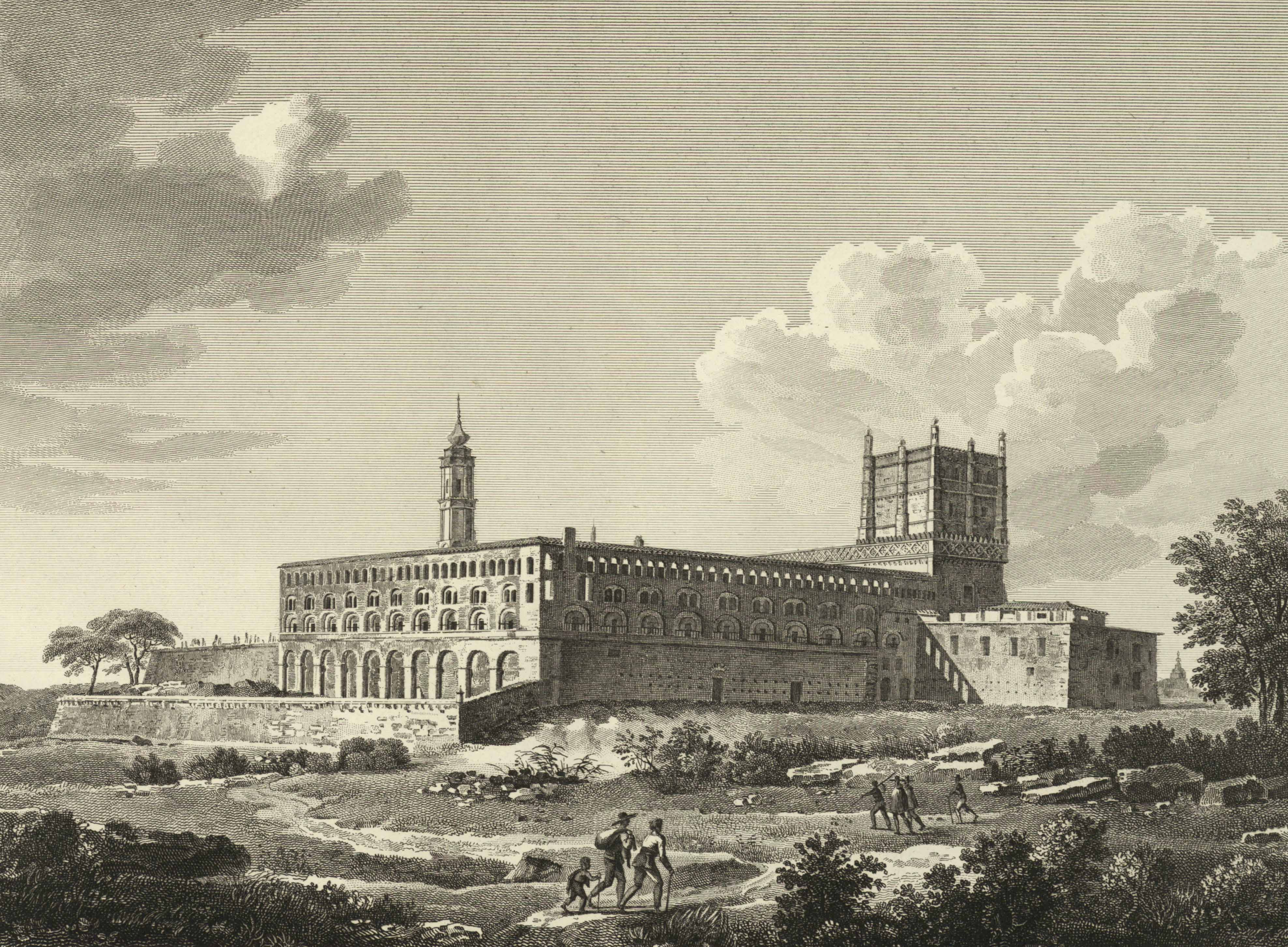
Monastery of Santa Engracia before the French Sieges, published in the work Voyage pittoresque et historique de l'Espagne

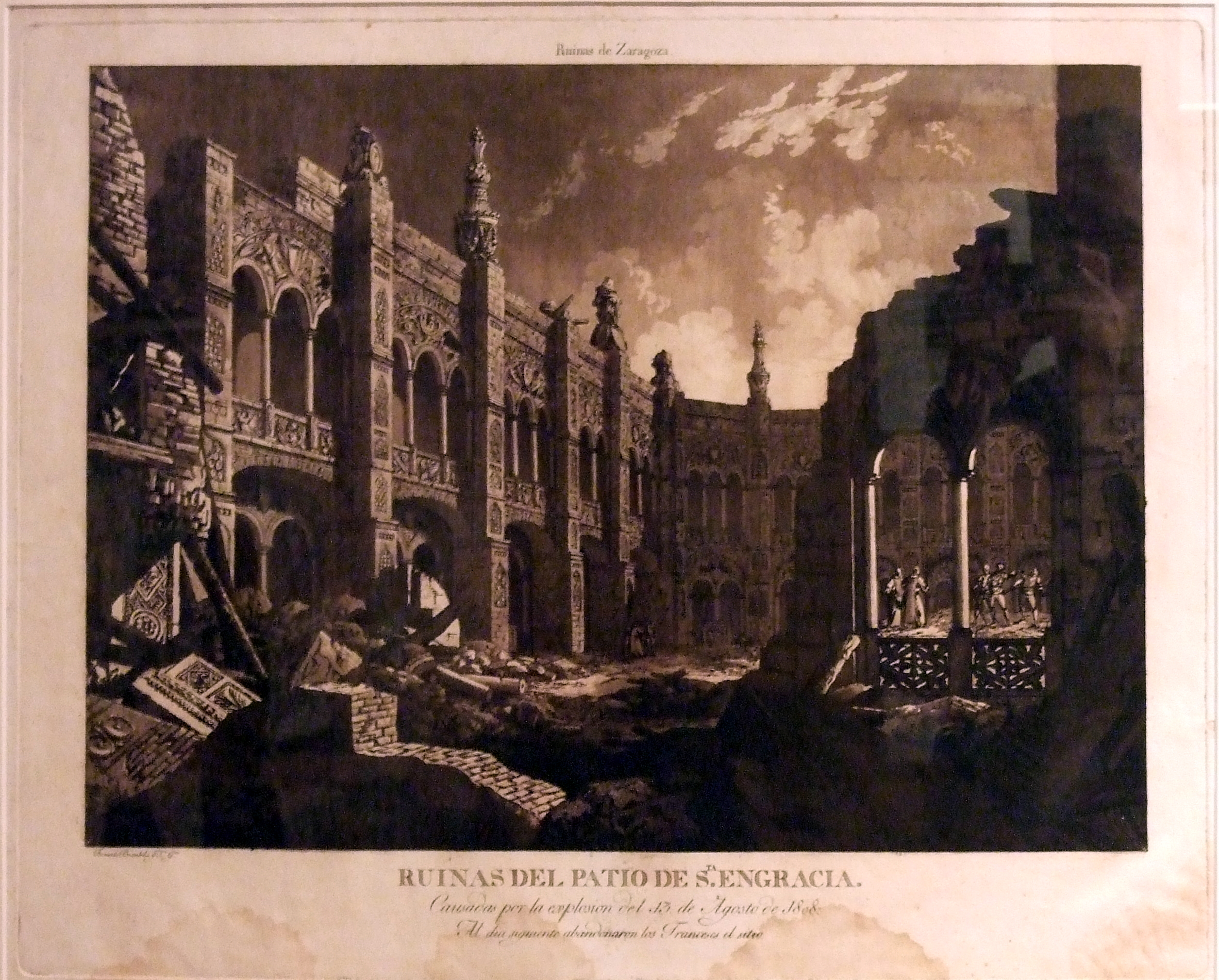
Ruins of a courtyard of Santa Engracia (1808–1813) by Italian Fernando Brambila and Spanish Juan Gálvez in their work Ruins of Zaragoza (artist book focused on the buildings that were ruined after the city's Napoleonic sieges)

== See also ==
- Church of Santa Engracia de Zaragoza
- List of missing landmarks in Spain
