= Miriam G. Sherin =

Miriam G. Sherin is a professor in the School of Education and Social Policy and the Learning Sciences Department at Northwestern University. Her areas of research include mathematics teaching and learning, teacher cognition, and teacher education. Sherin has published articles in Journal of Teacher Education, Teaching and Teacher Education, and Journal of Mathematics Teacher Education. Her most recent book, Mathematics Teacher Noticing: Seeing Through Teachers' Eyes, was publish in 2011 by Taylor & Francis. Since 2018 she has been associate provost for undergraduate education at Northwestern University. She is the sister of sociology scholar Adam Gamoran, currently president of the William T. Grant Foundation.

== Career ==
Sherin taught math and science at Lincoln Junior High School (1987–88) in Oceanside, CA and Lincoln Middle School (1988–89) in Vista, CA. She then spent 6 years substitute teaching in Berkeley Unified School District (1989–92) in Berkeley, CA and West Contra Costa Unified School District (1993–95) in Richmond, CA.

In 1996, Sherin began her post-doctoral fellowship at the Stanford Graduate School of Education. After completing her research at Stanford University, Sherin began as an assistant professor in the Northwestern University School of Education and Social Policy in 1997. She is currently a professor at Northwestern University and director of the undergraduate education program.

== Education ==
After attending public schools in Palatine, Illinois, Sherin received a BA in mathematics from University of Chicago in 1985. She went on to receive a master's degree in mathematics from University of California, San Diego in 1987. In 1996, she received a PhD in Science and Mathematics Education from University of California, Berkeley. Her thesis was titled The nature and dynamics of teachers' content knowledge.

== Awards and honors ==
In 1996 Sherin received a postdoctoral fellowship from the James S. McDonnell Foundation to examine the demands that mathematics reform places on teachers' knowledge.

In 2001 she received a postdoctoral fellowship from the National Academy of Education and the Spencer Foundation to examine how video clubs can support the development of teachers' professional vision.

Sherin was also awarded a five-year Early Career Grant from the National Science Foundation to study the ways that video can support teacher learning.

In April 2003, Sherin received the Kappa Delta Pi/American Educational Research Association Division K Award for early career achievements in research on teaching and teacher education.

== Selected publications ==
- Brantlinger, A., Sherin, M. G., & Linsenmeier, K. (2011). Discussing discussion: A video club in the service of math teachers' National Board preparation. Teachers and Teaching, 17(1), 5 – 33.
- Sherin, M. G., Linsenmeier, K. L., (2010). Principals' views of mathematics teacher learning. Journal of Mathematics Education Leadership. 20-32
- van Es, E. A. & Sherin, M. G. (2010). The influence of video clubs on teachers’ thinking and practice. Journal of Mathematics Teacher Education, 13, 155–176.
- Derry, S. J., Pea, R. D., Barron, B., Engle, R. A., Erickson, F., Goldman, R., Hall, R., Koschmann, T., Lemke, J., Sherin, M. G., Sherin, B. L. (2010). Conducting video research in the learning sciences: Guidance on selection, analysis, technology, and ethics. Journal of the Learning Sciences, 19, 3-53
- Sherin, M. G., & van Es., E. A. (2009). Effects of video club participation on teachers’ professional vision. Journal of Teacher Education 60(1), 20–37.
- Sherin, M. G., Linsenmeier, K., & van Es., E. A. (2009). Selecting video clips to promote mathematics teachers’ discussion of student thinking. Journal of Teacher Education, 60(3), 213–230.
- Sherin, M. G., & Drake, C. (2009). Curriculum strategy framework: Investigating patterns in teachers’ use of a reform-based elementary mathematics curriculum. Journal of Curriculum Studies 41(4), 467–500.
- Colestock, A. & Sherin, M. G. (2009). Teachers’ sense-making strategies while watching video of mathematics instruction. Journal of Technology and Teacher Education 17(1), 7-29.
- Sherin, M. G., & Sherin, B. L. (2008). Moving from shared data to shared frameworks. Journal for Research in Mathematics Education Monograph: 185- 194.
- Gomez, L., Sherin, M. G., Griesdorn, J., & Finn, L. (2008). Exploring the role of technology in pre-service teacher preparation. Journal of Teacher Education: 117–131.
- Sherin, M. G., Russ, R., Sherin, B. L., & Colestock, A. (2008). Professional vision in action: An exploratory study. Issues in Teacher Education: 27–46.
- van Es, E. A. & Sherin, M. G. (2008). Mathematics teachers ”learning to notice” in the context of a video club.. Teaching and Teacher Education: 244–276.
- Linsenmeier, K., & Sherin, M. G. (2007). What?, Wow!, and Hmm...: Video clips that promote discussion of student math thinking. Journal of Mathematics Education Leadership.
- Mendez, E. M., Sherin, M. G., Louis, D. A., (2007). Multiple perspectives on the development of a classroom discourse community. Elementary School Journal.
- Sherin, M. G. (2007). The development of teachers’ professional vision in video clubs in R. Goldman, R. Pea, B. Barron, & S. Derry, Video research in the learning sciences.
- Sherin, M. G., & van Es, E. A. (2005). Using video to support teachers’ ability to notice classroom interactions. Journal of Technology and Teacher Education 13(3): 475–491.
- Sherin, M. G., & Han, S. (2004). Teacher learning in the context of a video club. Teaching and Teacher Education, 20: 163–183.
- Sherin, M. G. (2004). New perspectives on the role of video in teacher education in J. Brophy Ed., Using video in teacher education (pp. 1–27). NY: Elsevier Science.
- Sherin, M. G. (2002). When teaching becomes learning. Cognition and Instruction, 20(2): 119–150.
- Sherin, M. G. (2001). Developing a professional vision of classroom events in Wood, T., Nelson, B. S., & Warfield, J. (Eds.), Beyond Classical Pedagogy: Teaching Elementary School Mathematics (pp. 75–93). Hillsdale, NJ: Erlbaum.
- Sherin, M. G., Sherin, B. L., & Madanes, R. (2000). Exploring diverse accounts of teacher knowledge. Journal of Mathematical Behavior: 18(3), 357–375.
- Sherin, M. G. (2000). Facilitating meaningful discussions about mathematics. Mathematics Teaching in the Middle School: 6(2), 186–190.
