= Moda =

Moda, MoDA or MODA may refer to:

== Animals ==
- Moda, a common name of Potorous platyops, the broad-faced potoroo

== Geography ==
- Moda, Kadıköy, a locality in Kadıköy district of Istanbul, Turkey

== People ==
- Moda Fincher, a broadcaster and member of the Texas Radio Hall of Fame
- Mo’da language

== Entertainment ==
- Moda Records, a record label
- Modà, Italian rock group
- "Moda", a 2005 song by Brant Bjork and the Bros from the album Saved by Magic

== Business ==
- Andrea Moda, an Italian fashion company
  - Andrea Moda Formula, a defunct racing team, named after Andrea Moda
- Moda FC, a defunct association football club in Turkey
- Moda Center, an indoor sports arena in Portland, Oregon, USA
- Slang for the drug Modafinil
- Moda Health, a health insurance company
- Moda Tower, an office building in Portland, Oregon, USA

== Acronyms ==
- Ministry of Digital Affairs, government agency of Taiwan
- Museum of Design Atlanta
- Museum of Domestic Design and Architecture, London

== See also ==
- La Moda (disambiguation)
- Mo Da
