= La moda =

La moda or La Moda may refer to:

- La Moda, an Argentine women's journal of the 1830s founded by Juan Bautista Alberdi
- La moda, a 1761 comic opera by Antonio Boroni, to a libretto by Pietro Cipretti
- La moda, a 1771 comic opera pasticcio with music by Antonio Salieri and others, to the same libretto by Pietro Cipretti
- La Moda, a 2005 album by Yaga & Mackie
- La moda (Garbo album), 2012

== See also ==
- Moda (disambiguation)
