= Missy =

Missy or Missie is a feminine first name, often a short form of Melissa.

== People ==
- Mathilde de Morny (1863-1944), French aristocrat and artist
- Michele "Missy" Avila (1968-1985), American murder victim
- Missie Berteotti (born 1963), American LPGA golfer
- Missy Bevers (1970–2016), American unsolved murder victim
- Missy Cummings, Associate Professor of Aeronautics and Astronautics at the Massachusetts Institute of Technology and former U.S. Navy fighter pilot
- Missy Elliott (born 1971), American rapper, singer, songwriter and record producer
- Missy Giove (born 1972), American former professional mountain bike rider
- Missy Gold (born 1970), American former child actress
- Missy Franklin (born 1995), American competitive swimmer
- Missy Higgins (born 1983), Australian singer and songwriter
- Missy Hyatt (born 1963), American professional wrestling valet
- Missy LeHand (1898–1944), longtime private secretary to U.S. President Franklin D. Roosevelt
- Missy Malone, British burlesque performer
- Missy Mazzoli (born 1980), American composer and pianist
- Missie McGeorge (born 1959), American LPGA golfer
- Missy Morton, New Zealand professor of disability studies and inclusive education
- Missy Peregrym, Canadian actress
- Missy Raines (born 1962), American bluegrass bassist
- Missy Robbins (born 1971), American chef
- Missy Schwen-Ryan (born 1972), American rower

== Characters ==
- Missy, a character in the 1991 American comedy-drama movie Fried Green Tomatoes
- Missy (short for The Mistress), a female incarnation of the villain The Master from the British science fiction series Doctor Who
- Missy Armitage, in the 2017 film Get Out
- Missy, character in The Fairly OddParents
- Missy Cooper, a character in the American television series Young Sheldon
- Missy Booth, character from the television series Ackley Bridge
- Melissa “Missy” Foreman-Greenwald, fictional character from the animation series Big Mouth

== See also ==
- Missi Pyle, American actress
- Misty (name)
