= Misty Sato =

Professor of education in New Zealand

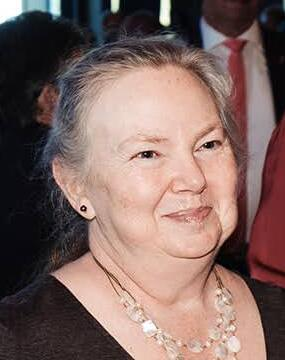
- Sato in 2025
- Born: Mistilina Sato

Academic background
- Education: Stanford University
- Thesis: Practical leadership (2002)
- Doctoral advisor: J. Myron Atkin

Mistilina Sato is Professor of Education in the School of Teacher Education at the University of Canterbury in New Zealand. She researches educational policy, teacher recruitment and training, leadership and performance assessment. She was part of a team who won the US National Staff Development Council's Best Research Award for a three-year project on the impacts of teacher certification. She has published on the educational policies and systems in China.

== Academic career ==
Sato began her career as a middle-school science teacher. She holds a Bachelor's degree in geological sciences from Princeton University, and in 2002 completed a PhD in education at Stanford University with a thesis titled Practical leadership, supervised by J. Myron Atkin. Sato joined the faculty of the University of Minnesota, where she was the inaugural Carmen Starkson Campbell Chair for Innovation in Teacher Development. In 2018 she moved to the University of Canterbury, where she was promoted to full professor in 2022.

Sato's research covers teacher education, evaluation and performance assessment of teachers, educational leadership, and policies that affect teachers and education.

From 2013 to 2016 Sato was appointed to the American Association of Colleges for Teacher Education Committee on Research and Dissemination. The committee assists members to reach "evidence-based professional consensus regarding education", considers the dissemination of research findings and serves as the editorial board for the Journal of Teacher Education.

Sato's book Empowered educators in China was published by Jossey-Bass in 2017, as part of a series on high-performing education systems around the world. The book describes the education policies and systems in China, with a focus on the particularly successful educational system in Shanghai.

== Awards ==
While at the University of Minnesota, Sato received the National Staff Development Council's 2009 Best Research Award alongside her collaborators Linda Darling-Hammond and Ruth Chung Wei. Their three-year research project showed that the process of certification can improve teachers' use of student learning assessments.

== Selected works ==
- Misty Sato; Margo Bartiromo; Susan Elko (2016). "Investigating your school's science teaching and learning culture". Phi Delta Kappan. 97 (6): 42–47. doi:10.1177/0031721716636872. Wikidata Q118211190.
- Misty Sato (2014). "What Is the Underlying Conception of Teaching of the edTPA?". Journal of Teacher Education. 65 (5): 421–434. doi:10.1177/0022487114542518. Wikidata Q118211191.
- Misty Sato (2008). "Ethical Tensions in Mentoring: Introduction". The New Educator. 4 (3): 199–203. doi:10.1080/15476880802234375. Wikidata Q118211193.
- Misty Sato; Ruth Chung Wei; Linda Darling-Hammond (2008). "Improving Teachers' Assessment Practices Through Professional Development: The Case of National Board Certification". American Educational Research Journal. 45 (3): 669–700. doi:10.3102/0002831208316955. Wikidata Q118211194.
- Misty Sato; Janet Coffey; Savitha Moorthy (2005). "Two teachers making assessment for learning their own". Curriculum Journal. 16 (2): 177–191. doi:10.1080/09585170500135996. Wikidata Q118211195.
- Darling-Hammond, Linda; Burns, Dion; Campbell, Carol; Goodwin, A. Lin; Hammerness, Karen; Low, Ee Ling; McIntyre, Ann; Sato, Mistilina; Zeichner, Kenneth, eds. (2017). Empowered educators how high-performing systems shape teaching quality around the world. Jossey-Bass. ISBN 978-1-119-36960-8. OCLC 1244444810.
