= Misty Keasler =

American photographer

Misty Keasler (born 1978) is an American photographer based in Dallas, Texas.

Her work is included in the collection of the Modern Art Museum of Fort Worth, the Dallas Museum of Art, and the Museum of Fine Arts Houston.

Keasler graduated from Columbia College Chicago in 2001, and received an MFA in Photography from Bard College in 2010. In 2003, she was awarded both the Lange-Taylor Prize and the Dallas Museum of Art DeGolyer Award.

She has enjoyed photography from an early age, and recalls early memories of family visits when her grandfather would take Polaroid photographs that were "not great" in quality, but that she was captivated by the "magical" way the image appeared. She was given her first camera, a Polaroid, at age 7.

Keasler considers herself both an artist and a documentarian, but not a photojournalist. Her work is often long-term, and invites viewers to think about socially significant issues and form their own conclusions, rather than to elicit a particular response through her photographs. Her work covers a range of often grotesque subjects, including garbage dumps, taxidermy, Japanese love hotels, and American haunted houses; and draws attention to how our cultures and values are reflected in our public and private spaces.

Her work is held in the permanent collections of the Modern Art Museum of Fort Worth, the Kiyosato Museum of Photographic Arts, the Museum of Fine Arts, Houston, and the Amon Carter Museum of American Art.

== Half Life ==
Misty Keasler's work photographing garbage dumps started in 2003, when she received a grant from Duke University's Center for Documentary Studies alongside Charles d'Ambrosio to photograph in Guatemala City, Guatemala. Their project, Guatemala City Dump: Life at the Rim, documenting a makeshift village in Guatemala City inhabited by displaced Mayan people, was awarded the 2003 Lange-Taylor Prize. After completion of that project, Keasler was commissioned by Harper's Magazine to photograph a garbage dump in Manila, Philippines. In January 2009, she traveled to Lagos, Nigeria to document the process of e-waste import and disposal, photographing the conditions and workers present in two garbage dumps. She made the images in her project Half Life over 12 years in these three locations, spending "weeks at a time" on location to ensure that her images "dignify [her] subjects".

== Love Hotels ==
In 2003, Keasler worked for several months as a teacher in Japan, where she was inspired to photograph love hotels for their offbeat aesthetic after reading about them in Lonely Planet. With the help of two translators, she gained access to photograph rooms in several hotels, and even the diaries left in rooms by visitors. She describes these images as both a study of private and public space, a topic common to much of her other work, as well as a study of the nature of sex and romance in modern Japan.

== Haunt ==
Keasler was first inspired to photograph haunted houses during a visit to Thrillvania in Terrell, Texas. Inspired to take photographs of the rooms as they appeared to visitors, she was eventually allowed access during the Summer of 2015 to shoot photographs of the rooms and portraits of the costumed actors for a feature in D Magazine. After photographing Thrillvania, Keasler was able to extend her project to other immersive haunted houses and attractions throughout the country, ultimately including them in her book and exhibition, Haunt. Using a Hasselblad camera and analogue film, she took photographs in ambient light that required long exposure times, and collaborated with Laura Steele to retouch the photographs in post-production to better convey the visitor experience. She took portraits with a "full studio setup," often flying cross-country to work with actors and costume and makeup crews on days when the attractions were closed.

The 13 haunt attractions featured in her work include:

- Terror on the Fox, Green Bay, WI
- 13th Gate, Baton Rouge, LA
- Netherworld, Atlanta, GA
- Thrillvania, Terrell, TX
- Pennhurst Asylum, Spring City, PA
- Haunted Overload, Lee, NH
- Scarehouse, Pittsburgh, PA
- Cutting Edge, Fort Worth, TX

Keasler aims to draw attention to the details present in such an immersive environment, explaining that most details are lost on visitors in the moment, but that these details, rather than the "spectacle of the room" are what makes the experience so unsettling.

(more exhibitions: http://photography-now.com/artist/misty-keasler)

== Publications ==
- Love Hotels: the Hidden Fantasy Rooms of Japan (2006)
- HAUNT (2017)

== Selected exhibitions ==
Solo Exhibitions:

The Guatemala City Dump Project, Houston Center for Photography, 2005.

Bard College MFA Thesis Show, Annandale-on-Hudson, NY, 2010.

Black Box, The Public Trust, Dallas, 2013.

Love Hotels, Museum of Contemporary Photography, Chicago, 2017, Photographs Do Not Bend (PNDB) Gallery, Dallas, 2007, Jenkins Johnson Gallery, New York, 2007.

HAUNT, Modern Art Museum of Fort Worth, Fort Worth, 2017, David Shelton Gallery, Houston, 2018.

Low Lands, The Public Trust, Dallas, 2019.

Group Exhibitions:

Infected Landscape, Julie Saul Projects, 2006.

The Art of Caring: A Look at Life Through Photography, New Orleans Museum of Art, 2009.

Life in Space, Dallas Museum of Art, 2009.

Pictures of Me, PNDB Gallery, Dallas, 2011.

Big Pictures, Amon Carter Museum of American Art, Fort Worth, 2013.

Framing Desire, Modern Art Museum of Fort Worth, 2015.

Basically Forever, Tokyo Metropolitan Museum of Photography, 2014.
