= Belbeuf =

- Commune
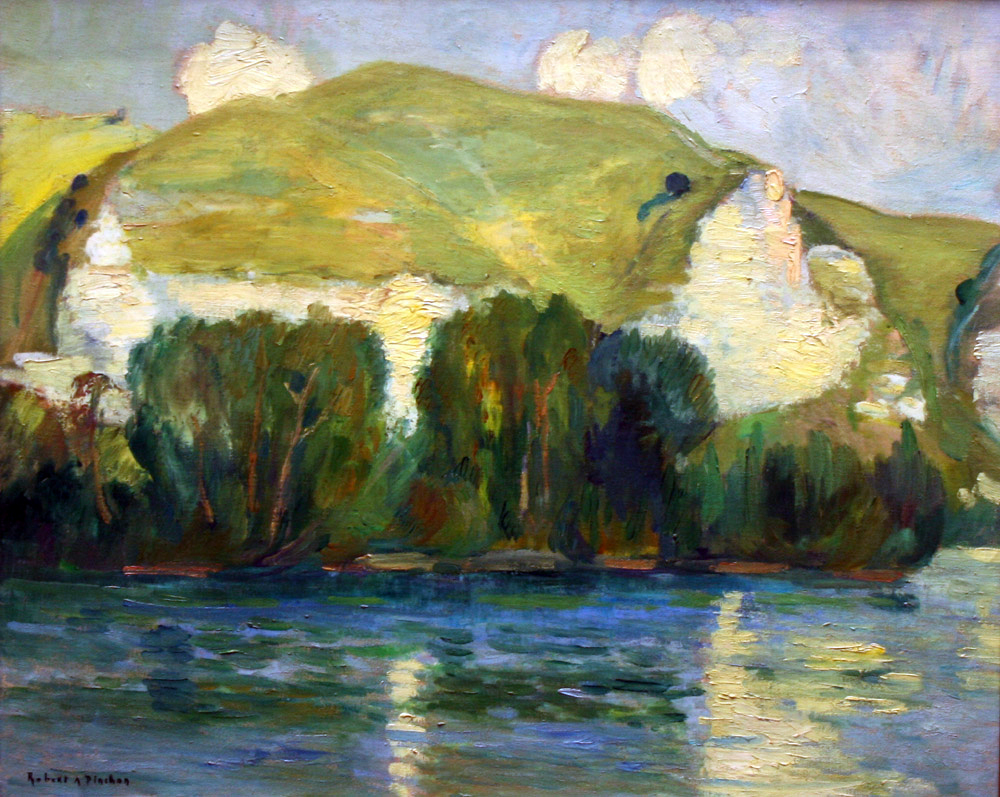
- The Cliffs of Belbeuf, by Robert Antoine Pinchon

- Coat of arms
- Location of Belbeuf
- Location within France Location within Normandy
- Coordinates: 49°23′23″N 1°08′37″E
- Country: France
- Region: Normandy
- Department: Seine-Maritime
- Arrondissement: Rouen
- Canton: Darnétal
- Intercommunality: Métropole Rouen Normandie

Government
  - Mayor (2026–32): Léon Taisne
- Area^{1}: 6.56 km^{2} (2.53 sq mi)
- Elevation: 156 m (512 ft)
- Highest elevation: 161 m (528 ft)
- Lowest elevation: 2 m (6.6 ft)
- Population (2023): 2,264
  - Density: 345/km^{2} (894/sq mi)
- Time zone: UTC+01:00 (CET)
  - Summer (DST): UTC+02:00 (CEST)
- INSEE/Postal code: 76069 /76240
- ^{1} French Land Register data, which excludes lakes, ponds, glaciers > 1 km^{2} (0.386 sq mi or 247 acres) and river estuaries.

Belbeuf (French pronunciation: [bɛlbœf]) is a commune in the Seine-Maritime department in the Normandy region in northern France.

== Geography ==
A small town of forestry, farming and a little light industry situated by the banks of the Seine, some 6 miles (9.7 km) south of Rouen at the junction of the D6015 and the D7 roads.

== Population ==
Historical population
Year	Pop.	±% p.a.
1968	1,240	—
1975	1,409	+1.84%
1982	1,681	+2.55%
1990	1,696	+0.11%
1999	2,032	+2.03%
2007	2,075	+0.26%
2012	1,951	−1.22%
2017	2,201	+2.44%
2023	2,264	+0.47%
Source: INSEE

== Places of interest ==
- The church of Notre-Dame, dating from the sixteenth century.
- A menhir.
- The eighteenth-century château with its dovecote and park.
- The sixteenth-century chapel of Saint-Bonaventure & Saint-Adrien, built around a cave in the cliffs overlooking the river.

== Notable people ==
- Jacques Anquetil, cyclist, lived here in the 1960s.
- Claude Bébéar, businessman, the former CEO of AXA Assurance, lived here.
- Jacques Godart, 6th Marquis de Belbeuf

== See also ==
- Communes of the Seine-Maritime department
