= Sophia Sergeyevna Trubetskaya =

Russian princess (1836–1898)

- Duchess of Morny; Duchess of Sesto
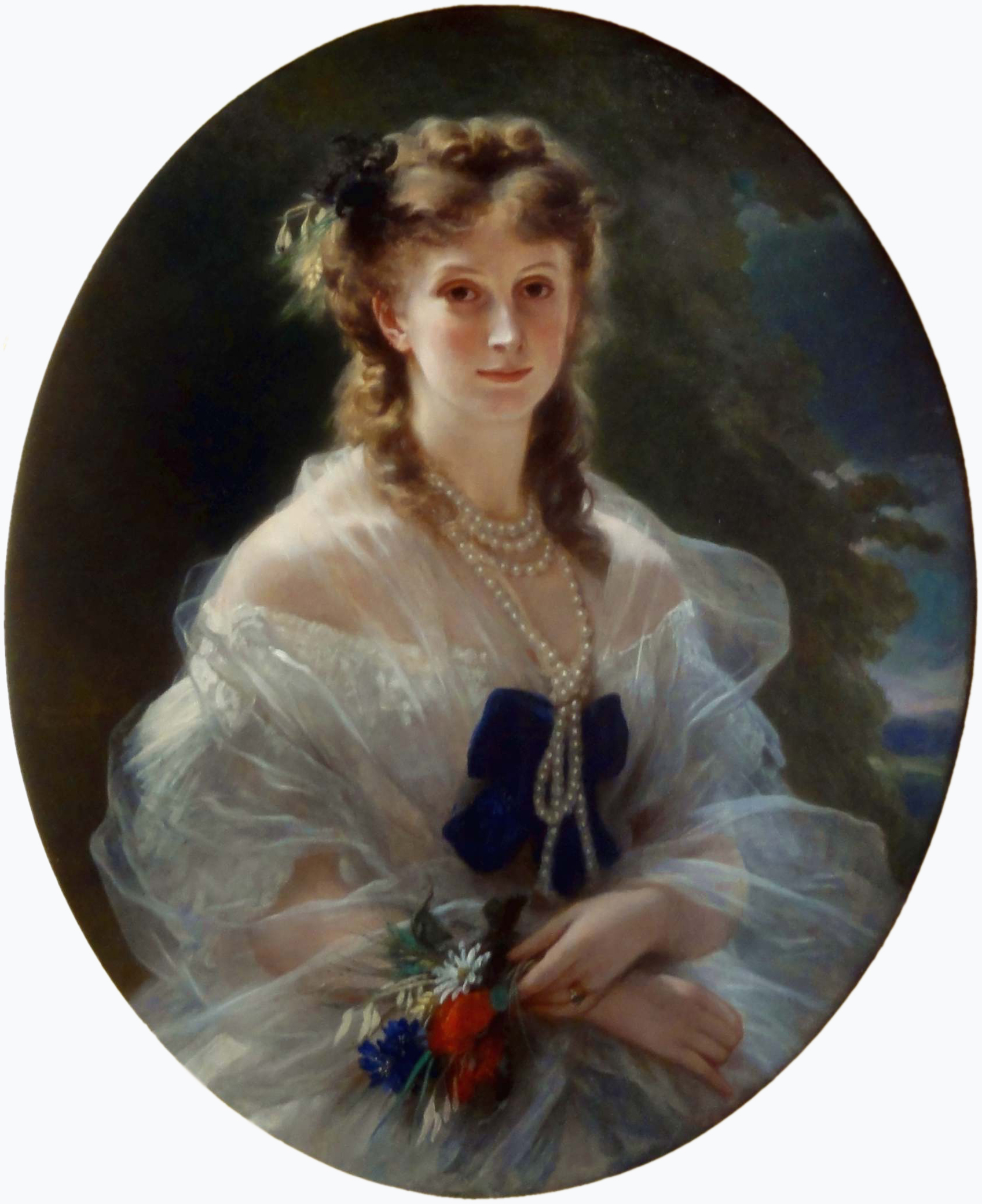
- Trubetskaya in 1863
- Born: 25 March 1836; Moscow, Russian Empire
- Died: 8 August 1898 (aged 62); Madrid, Kingdom of Spain
- Buried: Père Lachaise Cemetery, Paris
- Noble family: Trubetskoy
- Spouses: Charles, duc de Morny (m. 1857; died 1865) José Osorio, 9th Duke of Sesto (m. 1869)
- Issue: Charlotte; Auguste, Duke of Morny; Serge; Mathilde de Morny
- Father: Prince Sergey Vasilyevich Trubetskoy (officially); Nicholas I of Russia (rumoured)
- Mother: Ekaterina Petrovna Mussina-Pushkina

Sofia Sergeyevna Trubetskaya (Russian: Софья Сергеевна Трубецкая, IPA: [sɐˈfʲijə sʲɪrˈɡʲe(j)ɪvnə trʊbʲɪtsˈkajə]; 25 March [O.S. 14 March] 1836 – 8 August 1898) or Sophie Troubetskoy, Duchess of Morny (French: Sophie Troubetskoï, Duchesse de Morny, IPA: [sɔfi tʁubɛtskɔj dyʃɛs də mɔʁni]), later Sophie, Duchess of Sesto, was a Russian princess.

== Life ==
She was the daughter of Ekaterina Petrovna Mussina-Pushkina. Her father was either Ekaterina's husband the cavalry lieutenant Prince Sergey Vasilyevich Trubetskoy, making her their only child, or her lover Nicholas I of Russia of the House of Romanov. Her paternity was questioned right from her birth – shortly afterwards Sergey left for the Caucasus whilst Ekaterina went abroad, eventually settling in Paris with her daughter.

She met the Frenchman Charles de Morny, half-brother of Napoleon III, then special envoy to Russia, at the coronation of Alexander II. They married in St Petersburg on 7 January 1857 [O.S. 26 December 1856] and moved back to France together. They had four children:

- Charlotte (1858–1883), married José Osorio y Heredia, Count of Corzana, had a son;
- Auguste, Duke of Morny (1859–1920), married Carlotta Guzman y Ybarra, had two sons and one daughter;
- Serge (1861–1922), became an officer in the French army, died unmarried;
- Mathilde (1863–1944), married Jacques Godart, 6th Marquis de Belbeuf, had no children

They lived cosmopolitan lives in St Petersburg and Paris, with a love for exotic birds, monkeys and Japanese dogs. Her husband died suddenly on 26 February 1865 and she left their residence to live austerely in mourning. This lasted until she was looking through some documents and accidentally found a note for an assignation between Charles and his mistress. She then left mourning and slowly resumed her social life, in the course of which she met the Spanish nobleman José Osorio y Silva at his villa in Deauville, a major venue for the French aristocracy. He was living there with the exiled Spanish royal family and married Sofia in Vitoria on 21 March 1869. She organised social events, festivals and cultural gatherings to gain support and raise money for her husband's plan to restore the Spanish monarchy.

She was accepted into the Spanish aristocracy, becoming a dame of the Order of Queen Maria Luisa and introducing the tradition of the Christmas tree into Spain.

She died in Madrid in 1898.
