= Garbo (singer) =

Italian singer-songwriter

- Born: Renato Abate; April 25, 1958 (age 68); Milan, Italy
- Occupation: Singer-songwriter

Renato Abate (born 25 April 1958), best known as Garbo, is an Italian singer-songwriter and record producer. He is considered one of the most important exponents of Italian new wave music.

== Background ==
Born in Milan, Garbo made his debut in 1981 with A Berlino... Va Bene, an album influenced by the David Bowie's Berlin Trilogy. The eponymous title-track was released as a single and it was met with critical success. Garbo's two subsequent albums were well received, but the peak of his career came in 1984 with the song "Radioclima". Presented at the Sanremo Music Festival, it won the Critics Jury Award. Garbo returned to Sanremo the following year, with the song "Cose veloci". In 1993, he founded his own record label, Discipline, with which he released his later works.

In 2006, Garbo was honored by a tribute album, ConGarbo, where some of his most popular songs were covered by protagonists of the Italian independent music scene such as Baustelle, Delta-V, Krisma, Zu and Meg (former members of 99 Posse), Soerba (Luca Urbani and Gabriele D'Àmora), Andy (from Bluvertigo) and Boosta (from Subsonica).

In 2014, he acted in the film-comedy Sexy Shop.

== Discography ==
=== Studio albums ===
- 1981 - A Berlino... Va Bene
- 1982 - Scortati
- 1984 - Fotografie
- 1986 - Il Fiume
- 1988 - Manifesti
- 1990 - 1.6.2
- 1993 - Macchine Nei Fiori / Cosa Rimane... Rivisitazioni (81-91)
- 1995 - Fuori Per Sempre
- 1997 - Up The Line
- 1998 - Grandi Giorni
- 2002 - Blu
- 2005 - Gialloelettrico
- 2008 - Come Il Vetro
- 2012 - La Moda

=== Live albums ===
- 1995 - Garbo e Il Presidente Live

=== Compilation albums ===
- 2007 - The Best - Platinum Collection

=== Singles ===
- 1981 A Berlino...Va Bene
- 1982 Vorrei Regnare
- 1983 Generazione
- 1983 Quanti Anni Hai?
- 1984 Radioclima
- 1985 Cose Veloci
- 1986 Il Fiume
- 1986 Per Te
- 1987 Extragarbo
- 1988 Dal Silenzio
- 1990 Domani
- 1993 Ciao/Ciao 31
- 1998 Grandi Giorni
- 1998 Un Bacio
- 2002 Un Bacio Falso
- 2003 Migliaia Di Rose
- 2004 Radioclima (Electroclima Mix)
- 2005 Onda Elettrica
- 2006 Forse
- 2006 Giallo
- 2007 Grandi Giorni
- 2008 Voglio Morire Giovane
