= Misty Blowers =

American computer scientist

- Education: State University of New York; Syracuse University
- Scientific career
- Workplaces: US Marine Corps; Air Force Research Laboratory; George Mason University; Peraton; ICF; MTSI; Datalytica

Misty Blowers is an American computer scientist and chief executive officer of Datalytica, a Maryland-based business. She previously served as chief technology officer to the deputy commandant for information of the United States Marine Corps and as the Marine Corps' service-level coordinator for artificial intelligence.She was awarded the 2018 Early Achievement Award from SPIE.

== Early life and education ==
Blowers attended Oneida High School in Madison County, New York. She attended State University of New York College of Environmental Science and Forestry, where she earned a Bachelors degree in Paper Science in 1995. After graduating she spent six years working at Chemical Process Equipment Suppliers designing new pulp mill systems. Blowers completed a Masters in Computer Science at Syracuse University in 2003. She obtained her doctorate in Applied Science and Engineering at the State University of New York College of Environmental Science and Forestry in 2009.

== Career ==
Blowers is the chief executive officer of Datalytica, LLC, a technology company specializing in artificial intelligence, cybersecurity, digital engineering, and data analytics. A 2019 profile published by SPIE also identified her as the company's chief executive officer.

Blowers began to work for the Air Force Research Laboratory. She managed Cyber Operations and looked after over $175 million government contracts. Blowers has several patents for detection and tracking. She designed and developed a machine learning-based approach to monitor complex systems in real time and provide actionable alerts. In 2014 she was named "Technologist of the Year" by the Technical Association of Central New York, and is the only woman ever to win the prize.

She and a group of government/military leadership and the US Defense Industrial Base wrote the book Evolution of Cyber Operations and Technologies to 2035 in 2015. She founded Datalytica LLC in 2015. Blowers is involved with the development of programs for the US Department of Defense. She is an adjunct professor in Blockchain Technologies at George Mason University. Blowers was corporate director of strategic development at Peraton and performs similar work several other companies.

She was awarded the 2018 Early Achievement Award from SPIE. She was appointed to a NATO task force on Mission Assurance of Autonomous Unmanned Systems.

Blowers is the chief executive officer of Datalytica, a company based in Laurel, Maryland. In a 2026 interview, she emphasized the need to evaluate artificial intelligence systems under normal, stressed, and adversarial conditions before deployment, and called for measurable assessments of their reliability and limitations.
