= Jacques Godart, 6th Marquis de Belbeuf =

Jacques Godart, 6th Marquis de Belbeuf (27 May 1850 – 22 January 1906) was the 6th and last Marquis de Belbeuf and married French aristocrat Mathilde de Morny.

== Biography ==
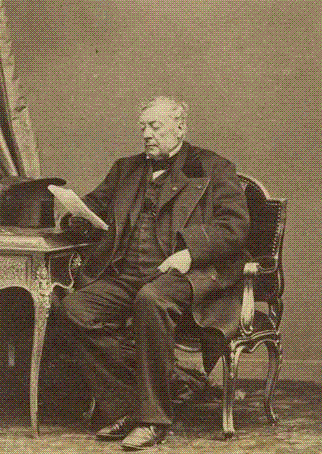
Louis Godart de Belbeuf (1791-1872)

Raoul Pierre Joseph Jacques Godart de Belbeuf was born on 27 May 1850, the son of Pierre Claude Raoul Godart de Belbeuf, Comte de Belbeuf (b. ca. 1820) and Camille Françoise Alix Siméon (1829-1898). His grandfather was Louis Godart, Marquis de Belbeuf (1791-1872).

On 11 December 1881, in Madrid, Godart married Mathilde de Morny, a French aristocrat and artist. Both were gay and Godard used the marriage to cover his homosexuality as was common at the time. The marriage was unhappy, de Morny "hated him"; they separated on 30 March 1897 and divorced on 8 December 1903.

The Godart family of Belbeuf was a noble family from Normandy. It owned for several centuries the land of Belbeuf, raised to a marquisate in 1719. The Godart were ennobled in 1587. In 1906, the death of Jacques Godart de Belbeuf ended the long male line of this name, the cousins having a different name.

== Belbeuf ==
Belbeuf owed its creation and its importance to the settlement of the Normans, around the middle of the 10th century and seems to take its name from the word "bel" (beautiful and big) and "beuf" or "bu" (bourg), i.e. a beautiful and large village. In 1050 it became Bellebueth and in 1260 Bullebu, and later Beulebeuf. The signority of Belbeuf is known from the end of the 14th century. Its first lords were: Colin Langlois, who in 1390 had the title of squire, Jean d'Auricher, who seems to be the first to bear the title of seigneur of Belbeuf in the early years of the 15th century, and Jacques de Poissy, lord of Gouy in 1417. Belbeuf remained in the possession of this house until 1539, when Louise de Poissy, sole heiress of the lands of Belbeuf, Gouy and Becquet brought them by marriage to Guillaume d'Hellenvilliers. In 1564 he sold Belbeuf to Nicolat Puchot de Gerponville, one of whose descendants sold it in 1597 to Jean Godart (d. 1601), who could then add to his name that of his land (Jean Godart de Belbeuf); his descendants would keep the estate without interruption for 333 years, and it was in 1719 that Louis XV erected the lordship in Marquisat in favor of Pierre Godart, 1st Marquis of Belbeuf (1650-1720).

Jean Pierre Prosper Godart, 3rd Marquis of Belbeuf (1725-1811) was General Prosecutor in the Parliament of Normandy and Grand Panetier of Normandy (an honor that consisted in presenting the bread to the king during his travels, privilege enjoyed by Jean Pierre Prosper in 1786 at the passage of Louis XVI in Rouen); he is buried in front of the main portal of the church of Belbeuf (the slab still exists). Jacques Godart, 6th Marquis of Belbeuf (1850-1906), ended the long male line of this name, but a collateral branch, the de Mathan, owned the ancestral domain for 25 years more.

It was Raoul de Mathan who sold the estate in 1930 to Olivier Jallu, a lawyer in Paris. Occupied by the German armies during the World War II, stripped of its furniture and requisitioned for the housing of twenty families, the structure of the castles collapsed in 1956 and an auction in 1957 dispersed everything that presented more value; finally, in 1958, Axa became owner of the castle, whose interior restoration began in 1963 and the office building was inaugurated in May 1968.
