= Journal of Teacher Education =

- Discipline: Education
- Language: English
- Edited by: Cheryl J. Craig and Valerie Hill-Jackson

Publication details
- History: 1950-present
- Publisher: SAGE Publications in association with the American Association of Colleges for Teacher Education (United States)
- Frequency: 5/year
- Impact factor: 4.130 (2021)

Standard abbreviations
- ISO 4: J. Teach. Educ.

Indexing
- ISSN: 0022-4871 (print); 1552-7816 (web)
- LCCN: 52000652
- OCLC no.: 692967632

Links
- Journal homepage; Online access; Online archive

The Journal of Teacher Education is a peer-reviewed academic journal that covers the field of education. The journal's editors-in-chief are Cheryl J. Craig and Valerie Hill-Jackson (Texas A&M University). It was established in 1950 and is published by SAGE Publications in association with the American Association of Colleges for Teacher Education.

== Abstracting and indexing ==
The journal is abstracted and indexed in Sociological Abstracts and the Social Sciences Citation Index. According to the Journal Citation Reports, its 2021 impact factor is 4.130, ranking it 43 out of 267 journals in the category "Education & Educational Research".
