= Mathilde de Morny =

French painter (1863–1944)

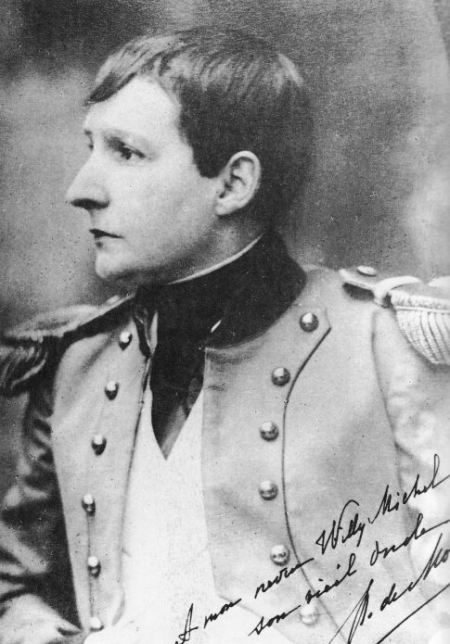
Mathilde "Missy" de Morny

Mathilde de Morny (26 May 1863 – 29 June 1944) was a French aristocrat and artist. She was also known by the nickname "Missy," the artistic pseudonym "Yssim" (an anagram of Missy), and the names "Max", "Uncle Max" (French: Oncle Max), and "Monsieur le Marquis". Active as a sculptor and painter, Morny studied under Comte Saint-Cène and the sculptor Édouard-Gustave-Louis Millet de Marcilly.

== Early life ==
Morny was the fourth and final child of Charles de Morny, Duke of Morny and Sofia Sergeyevna Trubetskaya. Charles was the half-brother of Napoleon III, while Sofia may have been the illegitimate daughter of Nicholas I of Russia. As a teenager, she adhered to sartorial convention. An 1882 magazine article describes the newlywed marquise as wearing "a dress of the very palest mauve, mixed tulle and silk," adding that Morny "is not exactly pretty, but has a most original face, being very pale, with a very set expression, the darkest eyes possible, and quantities of very fair hair."

== Career ==
Extravagant conduct made Morny a celebrity of the Belle Époque and despite her 1881 marriage to the well-known gay man Jacques Godart, 6th Marquis de Belbeuf (1850–1906)—whom she divorced in 1903—Morny was open about preferring women. Though love between those perceived as women was then fashionable, Morny was attacked for this, especially for having a very masculine dress and attitude. At this time a woman wearing trousers could still scandalize even if the person was legally authorized, as in the case of artist Rosa Bonheur (who sought police permission to wear trousers to make it easier for her to paint in the countryside). Morny wore a full three-piece suit (which, as with trousers, was forbidden in France for anyone but men), had short hair, and smoked a cigar.

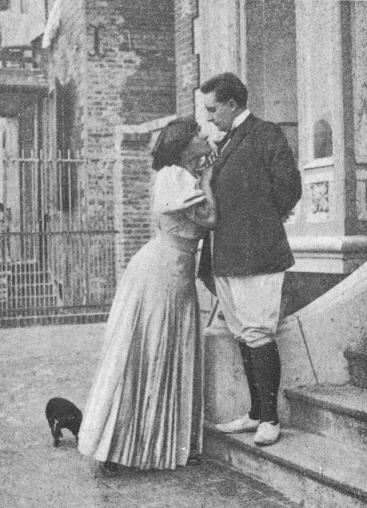
Colette and Mathilde "Max" de Morny

Morny became a lover of several women in Paris, including Liane de Pougy and Colette. From summer 1906 onwards, she and Colette lived together in the "Belle Plage" villa in Le Crotoy, where Colette wrote Les Vrilles de la vigne and La Vagabonde which would be adapted for the screen by Musidora. On 3 January 1907 the two put on a pantomime entitled Rêve d'Égypte ("Dream of Egypt") at the Moulin Rouge, in which Morny caused a scandal by playing an Egyptologist during a love scene with a woman – a kiss between them almost caused a riot and the production was stopped by the prefect of police Louis Lépine. From then on they could no longer live together openly, though the relationship lasted until 1912. Morny also inspired the character "La Chevalière" in Colette's novel Le Pur et l'impur, described as dressed "in dark masculine attire, belying any notion of gaiety or bravado... High born, she slummed it like a prince."

On 21 June 1910, the couple bought the manor of "Rozven" at Saint-Coulomb in Brittany (its owner, Baron du Crest, refused the sale because Mathilde was not dressed as a woman and so Colette signed the deed instead)—on the same day the first chamber of the tribunal de grande instance for the Seine departement pronounced Colette's divorce from Henry Gauthier-Villars. When they separated a year later, Colette kept the house.

== Identity ==
Morny dressed in men's clothing and used several nicknames, including "Monsieur le Marquis," "Missy," and "Max". Scholars are divided on whether to classify Morny as a transgender man or a butch lesbian. Claims from Simone Weil, a Parisian philosopher of the era who was not particularly close to Morny, have been cited to suggest that Morny may have undergone gender-affirming top surgery; Weil is the only contemporary source for the claim. Other depictions describe Morny and Colette as a "butch femme couple." Much of our evidence pointing towards Morny's identity comes from the works of Colette, rather than autobiographical statements by Morny. Kadji Amin, a Women's, Gender, and Sexuality Studies professor at Emory University, wrote that Colette is too unreliable a narrator to give us a definitive answer on Morny's identity either way.

== Death ==
At the end of May 1944, Morny attempted to commit suicide by what Colette described as "something like harakiri". She died by self-asphyxiation with a gas stove on 29 June 1944, aged 81, in the 16th arrondissement of Paris.

== In popular culture ==
Morny is a major character in the 2018 film Colette, played by Denise Gough.

== Bibliography ==
- Fernande Gontier et Claude Francis, Mathilde de Morny. La Scandaleuse Marquise et son temps, Perrin, 2005.
- Fernande Gontier, Homme ou femme ? La confusion des sexes, chapter 8, Paris, Perrin, 2006.
- Colette, Lettres à Missy. Edited and annotated by Samia Bordji and Frédéric Maget, Paris, Flammarion, 2009.
- Olga Khoroshilova, Russian travesties: in history, culture and everyday life (in Russian), chapter 11 "Russian Uncle Max (Mathilde de Morny)", Moscow, MIF, 2021. - P. 235–255.
