= La moda (Garbo album) =

Studio album by Garbo
- Released: 2012
- Label: Discipline

Garbo chronology
Come il vetro (2008)	La moda (2012)	Fine (2015)

La moda is a 2012 studio album by Italian singer Garbo. For this, the singer's fourteenth album, most of the songs were co-written with Luca Urbani, ex it:Soerba. Reviewers noted the influence, beyond Garbo's debt to David Bowie, of Virgin Prunes, Depeche Mode and Nine Inch Nails.

== Track listing ==
1. "Sembra" – 4:49
2. "La moda" – 3:24
3. "Sexy" – 4:25
4. "Quando cammino, Pt. 2" – 3:31
5. "Sparare" – 5:24
6. "Gira in continuazione, Pt. 3" – 3:46
7. "Movimento notturno" – 7:07
8. "Errori" – 3:40
9. "Metà cielo" – 4:22
10. "Architettura MIG" – 8:50
