= Thrillvania =

American theme park

- Interactive map of Thrillvania
- Location: Terrell, Texas, U.S.
- Coordinates: 32.6863°N 96.2467°W
- Opened: 1996
- Website: Official website

Thrillvania is an immersive haunted house theme park located in Terrell, Texas. The park consists of 50 acres, and is considered a major international horror theme park. Created by Lance Pope in 1996, Thrillvania was one of the first haunted house parks to use film special effects such as animatronics and pyrotechnics.

== History ==
Lance Pope bought a Antebellum South-style attraction called Cannon Manor from four former Disney Imagineers. In 1996, Pope moved the attraction (renamed Verdun Manor) to Terrell, where it became the foundation for the currently-named Thrillvania. Pope died in 2002 (at age 37). Thrillvania currently encompasses an immersive environment where the spectators are led through the experience. According to the Travel Channel and Reader's Digest, Thrillvania constitutes one of the largest and top rated international horror theme parks.

== Houses ==
Thillvania Haunted House Park includes three main sights, including Verdun Manor, Cassandra's House of Clowns and Sam Hain's Trail of Torment. Each house presents different themes. Verdun Manor, the largest house, has a zombie, traditional haunted house theme. Cassandra's House of Clowns is the clown house. Sam Hain's Trail of Torment is a trail walk through that consists of mutated villagers who have been living on the trail for years.
