= Lupercus of Berytus =

Greek grammarian of late antiquity

Lupercus of Berytus (Ancient Greek: Λούπερκος Βηρύτιος) was a Greek grammarian active during the 3rd century CE, likely flourishing shortly before the brief reign of Emperor Claudius Gothicus (268–270 CE). He was associated with the scholarly milieu of Berytus (modern-day Beirut), a prominent center of Roman and Hellenistic learning.

Lupercus authored several works, including: On the Word "an" (Περὶ τοῦ ἂν) (in three books); On the Word "taws" (Περὶ τοῦ ταώς); On the Shrimp (Περὶ τῆς καρίδος); On the Cock in Plato (Περὶ τοῦ παρὰ Πλάτωνι ἀλεκτρυόνος); The Foundation of Arsinoe in Egypt (Κτίσιν τοῦ ἐν Αἰγύπτῳ Ἀρσινοήτου); Attic Vocabulary (Ἀττικὰς λέξεις); The Art of Grammar (Τέχνην γραμματικήν); and On the Masculine, Feminine, and Neuter Genders (Περὶ γενῶν ἀῤῥενικῶν καὶ θηλυκῶν καὶ οὐδετέρων) (in thirteen books).

His writings contributed to the grammatical and rhetorical literature of his time and were occasionally cited by later scholars. Although much of his work has not survived, references to his contributions are found in historical sources.
