= Moda Fincher =

American radio host (1924–2006)

Moda "Misty" Fincher
- Born: October 12, 1924; Bronte, Texas, US
- Died: December 27, 2006 (aged 82)
- Resting place: Shannon Rosehill Cemetery, Fort Worth
- Occupation: Radio announcer

Moda "Misty" Fincher (October 12, 1924 – December 27, 2006) was Texas radio's and American radio's first full-time female staff announcer. Her radio career spanned 51 years. She was inducted into the Texas Radio Hall of Fame on October 26, 2006.

== Biography ==
She was born Moda Fincher in Bronte, Texas to William Allen and Moda (Miller) Fincher on October 12, 1924, but she was known on the air simply as "Misty." She graduated from Lubbock High School in Lubbock, Texas in 1941, and moved to Fort Worth, Texas. She started her career as a vocalist and self-taught drummer for the all-girl Billye Gale Band, and was with them for 5 1/2 years.

Misty always wanted to be a radio deejay. As a youth, she would fashion an imaginary microphone with a tomato soup can and a sawed-off broom pole. She went to work at KXOL-AM in Fort Worth, where she filed albums and pulled wire reports for sports broadcasts. She let it be known that she'd like to be a deejay, which, she recalled, "was a real thigh-slapper to management." On March 5, 1955, she was abruptly handed the midnight-to-6 am shift - seven nights a week, no days off, for $40 a week. She could not use her name. Instead, she was known as "The Frontier Gal" and had to agree to wear a Lone Ranger-like mask when out in public. She was 29 years old. Few expected her to succeed in what was then a male-dominated field.

She found more support and better pay in Lubbock in 1956, when the general manager of KDUB-AM, an AM radio station, offered her the same shift, midnight to 6 am, but with two days off each week and a raise to $75 per week. She later worked for the first Lubbock FM radio station, KBFM. Her Music with Misty program specialized in instrumental, easy-listening music. She worked on the MDA Telethon with Jerry Lewis for nineteen years.

In 1970, she went to work for KLBK-FM, where she premiered Music with Misty. When a tornado struck Lubbock on May 11, 1970, she refused to give up her post. She chose to broadcast continually for 26 hours so listeners could be reassured by her calmly delivered news reports.

In 1974 KLBK-FM changed formats to simulcast with KLBK AM, and play hard rock at night. Misty moved over to KEND 1590 AM and took over the long running program, Music for Lovers Only. Her show ran from 9pm to midnight. Circa 1975, KEND was sold and the station's new owners switched to NBC's News and Information Service. Misty worked at the all-news station as a feature reporter and even did a few newscasts. Around 1976, she was hired by KNFM and moved to Midland. She worked in Midland for about five years at KNFM before returning to Lubbock. After returning to Lubbock, she did some brief part-time work on KCAS Radio, a daytime-only AM station.

In 1998, Misty came out of retirement and, at age 75, went to work as a deejay on radio station KDAV-AM, located in Lubbock's Depot District. KDAV installed an old analog studio just for her, including turntables, tape deck, and a big chrome microphone on a stand. "This little old lady..." (still wearing her trademark dark glasses) "...would shuffle in before 9pm, a tight double armed grasp on her albums held against her breast", and make the magic happen.

Misty had what might be the largest collection of vinyl and shellac records in the world, totaling over 15,000 albums. "Someone to Watch Over Me" was her favorite song.

She received honors from the American Women's Association and the Women in Communications' Margaret Casky Award. In 1981, Lubbock's then mayor Bill McAlister proclaimed October 10 "Misty Day" in Lubbock.

On October 28, 2006, Misty was inducted into the Texas Radio Hall of Fame, placing her alongside radio personalities such as George Carlin (a fellow alumnus of KXOL), Sam Donaldson and Clint Formby. Ira McComic said, "There are so many things I admire about this lovely lady and so many reasons why I am proud to be the one who nominated her. But I'll limit myself to just three of Misty's qualifications: pioneer, professionalism and passion. ... As a role model for professionalism, nobody topped Misty, who arrived at the station every evening, always on time and always prepared for her show. ... Misty loves radio, she loves the music she shares with listeners, and she loves those listeners."

Fincher died on December 27, 2006, at the age of 82.
