= Guesdon =

Guesdon is a surname, and may refer to:

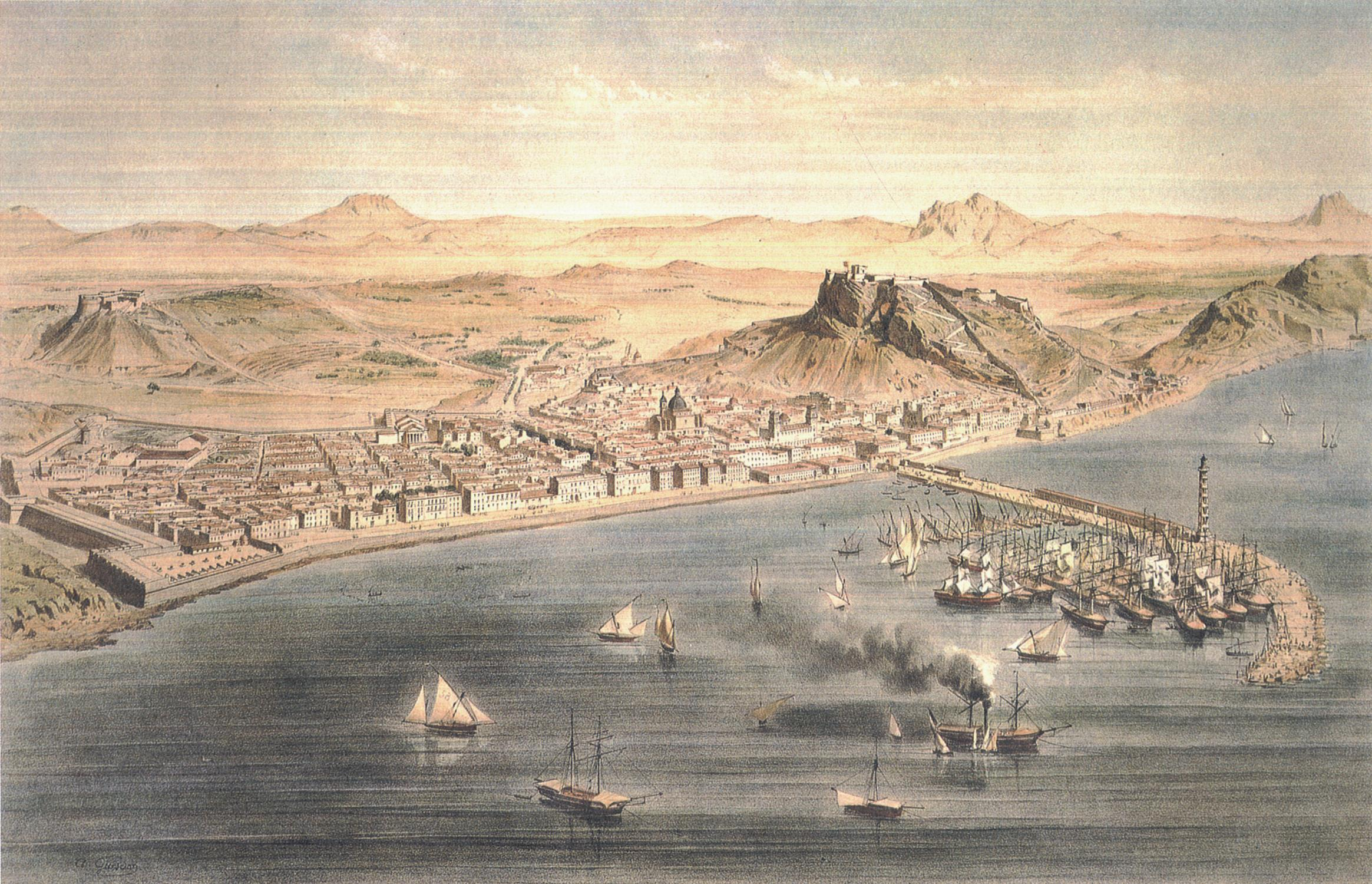
Engraving by Alfred Guesdon

- Alfred Guesdon (1808–1876), lithographer, architect
- André Guesdon (1948–2020), French football defender
- Frédéric Guesdon (born 1971), French cyclist
- William Guesdon (1848-1926), Australian businessman, politician and racing identity
