= American Association of Colleges for Teacher Education =

Nonprofitable national alliance of education programs

AACTE (American Association of Colleges for Teacher Education) is a nonprofit national association of educator preparation programs, including universities and community colleges, dedicated to professional development of Pre-K-12 teachers and school leaders.

AACTE has over 500 member institutions, which are both public and private colleges and universities across the United States.

AACTE’s member institutions and programs prepare the greatest number of professional educators in the United States and its territories, including teachers, counselors, administrators, and college faculty.
