= Deauville =

- Commune
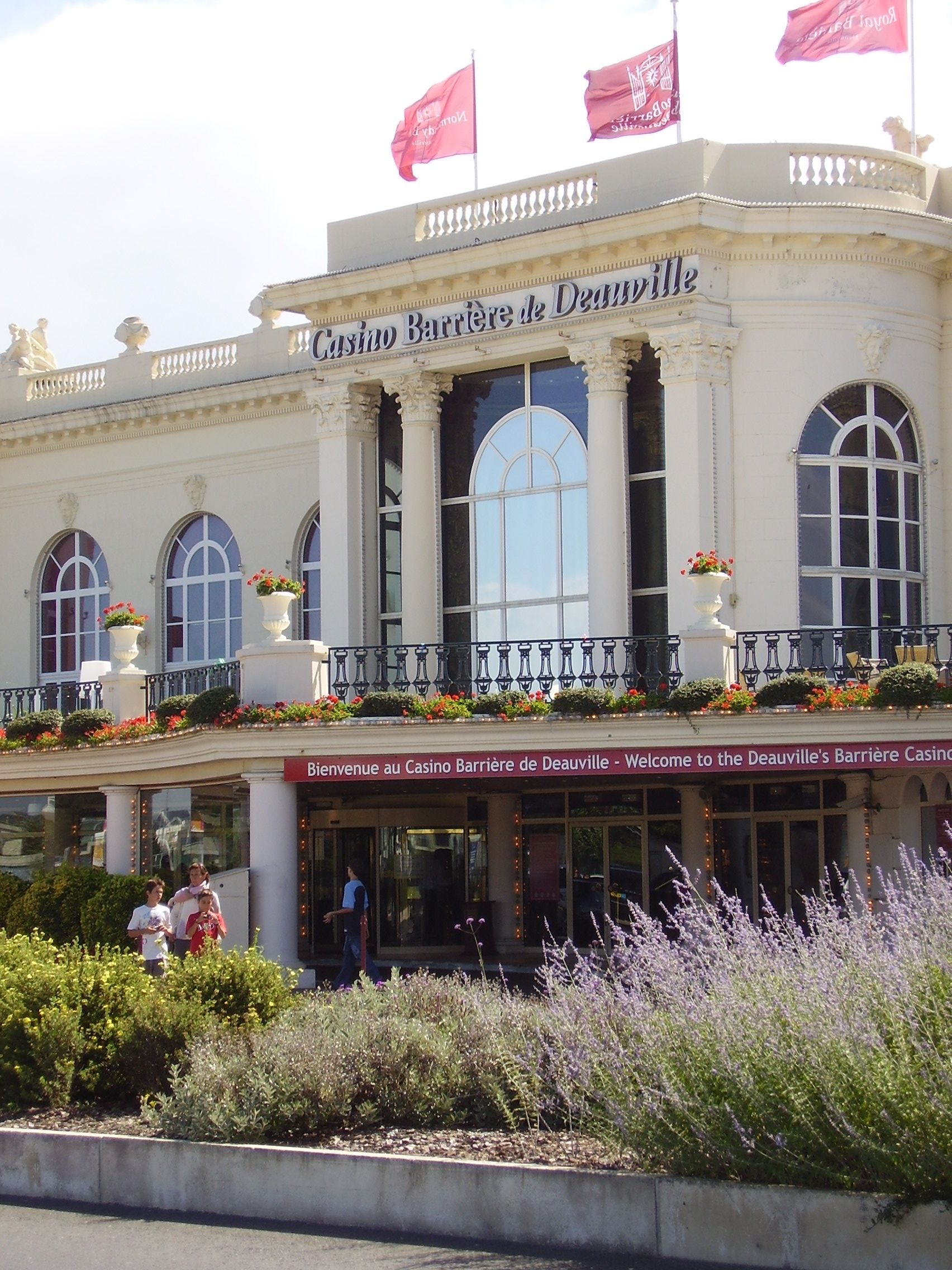
- Seaside casino

- Coat of arms
- Location of Deauville
- Location within France Location within Normandy
- Coordinates: 49°22′N 0°05′E
- Country: France
- Region: Normandy
- Department: Calvados
- Arrondissement: Lisieux
- Canton: Honfleur-Deauville
- Intercommunality: CC Cœur Côte Fleurie

Government
  - Mayor (2020–2026): Philippe Augier
- Area^{1}: 3.57 km^{2} (1.38 sq mi)
- Elevation: 5 m (16 ft)
- Highest elevation: 83 m (272 ft)
- Lowest elevation: 0 m (0 ft)
- Population (2023): 3,539
  - Density: 991/km^{2} (2,570/sq mi)
- Time zone: UTC+01:00 (CET)
  - Summer (DST): UTC+02:00 (CEST)
- INSEE/Postal code: 14220 /14800
- Website: mairie-deauville.fr
- ^{1} French Land Register data, which excludes lakes, ponds, glaciers > 1 km^{2} (0.386 sq mi or 247 acres) and river estuaries.

Deauville (French pronunciation: [dovil]) is a commune in the Calvados department, Normandy, northwestern France. Major attractions include its harbour, race course, marinas, conference centre, villas, Grand Casino, and hotels. The first Deauville Asian Film Festival took place in 1999. As the closest seaside resort to Paris, Deauville is one of the most notable seaside resorts in France. The city and its region of the Côte Fleurie (Flowery Coast) have long been home to the French upper class's seaside houses and is often referred to as the Parisian riviera.

Since the 19th century, the town of Deauville has been a fashionable holiday resort for the international upper class. In France, it is perhaps most well known for its role in Proust's In Search of Lost Time.

== History ==
The history of Deauville can be traced back to 1060, when seigneur Hubert du Mont-Canisy controlled the land, which was previously known as Auevilla. In 1066, Hubert du Mont-Canisy left to follow William the Conqueror to England.

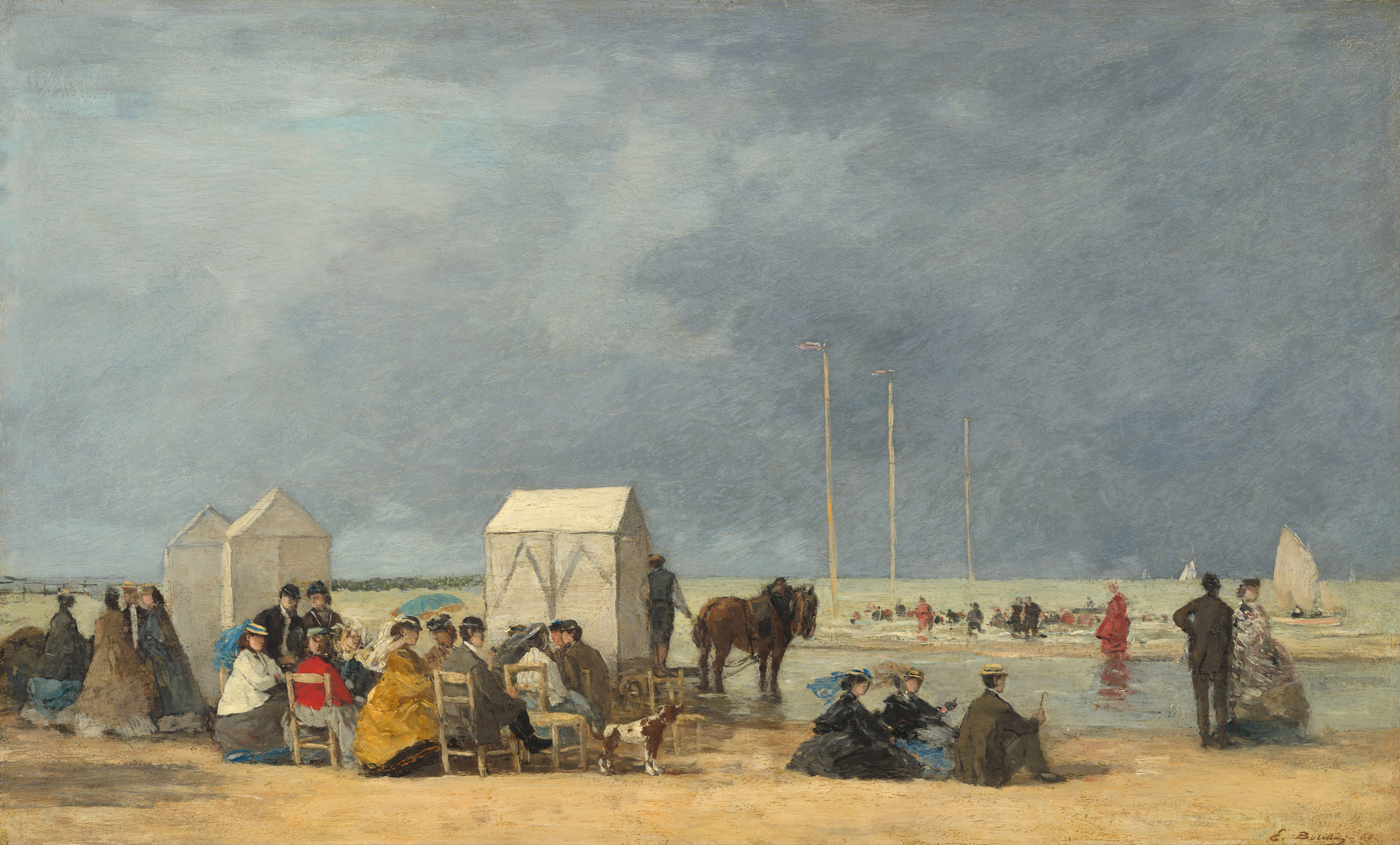
Bathing Time at Deauville, by Eugène Boudin, 1865

Until 1860, Deauville was governed by a succession of mayors and gradually became known for its horse breeding and the cultivation of sainfoin. Duc Charles Auguste Louis Joseph de Morny, the half brother of the emperor Napoleon III, transformed Deauville into a more travelled resort on request of his wife Sofia Sergeyevna Trubetskaya and her friend, art collector Konstantin Rudanovsky. Before the death of the Duc in 1865, certain key investments were made that would transform Deauville's history, including a railway from Paris to Deauville, the Deauville hippodrome, and a small casino. Within three years, over forty villas were constructed in the surrounding area, and 200 rooms, as well as other accommodations, were finalized in the Grand Hotel. the Duc de Morny also established the construction of a church and a school in 1863. In the same year, "La Terrasse" was created. La Terrasse was a complex for hydrotherapeutic baths and other cures, as well as a 1,800-metre promenade along the seaside.

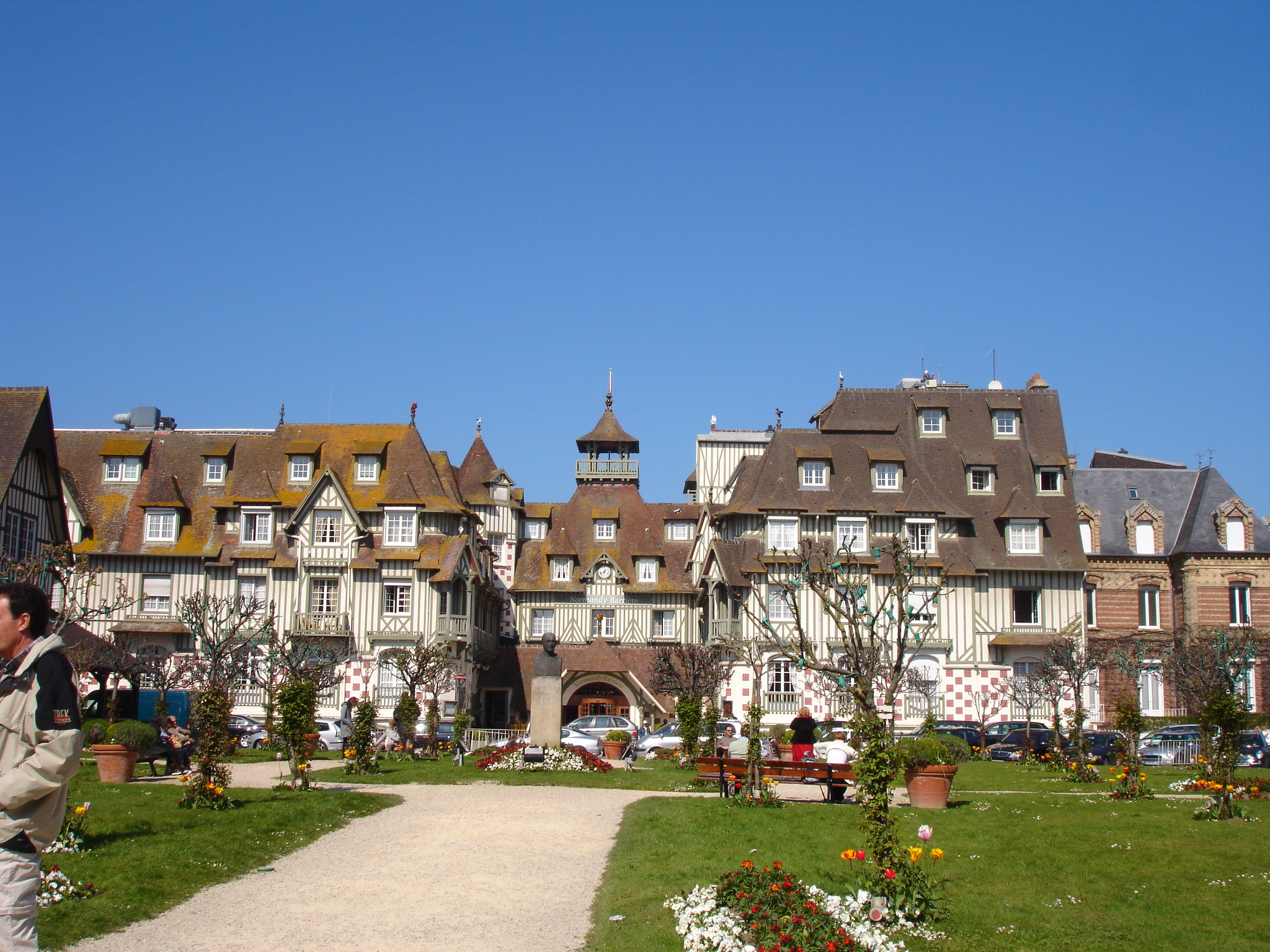
Seaside 5-star Hôtel Normandy Barrière and its gardens

Following the Duc's death, Deauville grew gradually, but it was not until the early 20th century when Désiré le Hoc and Eugene Cornuché, pushed Deauville into another period of transformation and development. The still-famous Normandy Barrière and Royal hotels and the casino opened in the years 1911 and 1913. Renovations were carried out and extensions were made to the hippodrome, telephone lines were set up, the sales of yearlings saw historic highs, and up to 62 English and French yachts occupied the basin. During these years many luxury boutiques opened in the streets of Deauville, including Coco Chanel's first shop; many stores from Paris decided it was worthwhile establishing themselves in the up-and-coming resort.

During World War I, wounded soldiers would be cared for in Deauville's hotels and casino. The war also took a heavy toll on Deauville's blossoming market and trade sector, as merchants were forced to dedicate many of their products to the war effort.

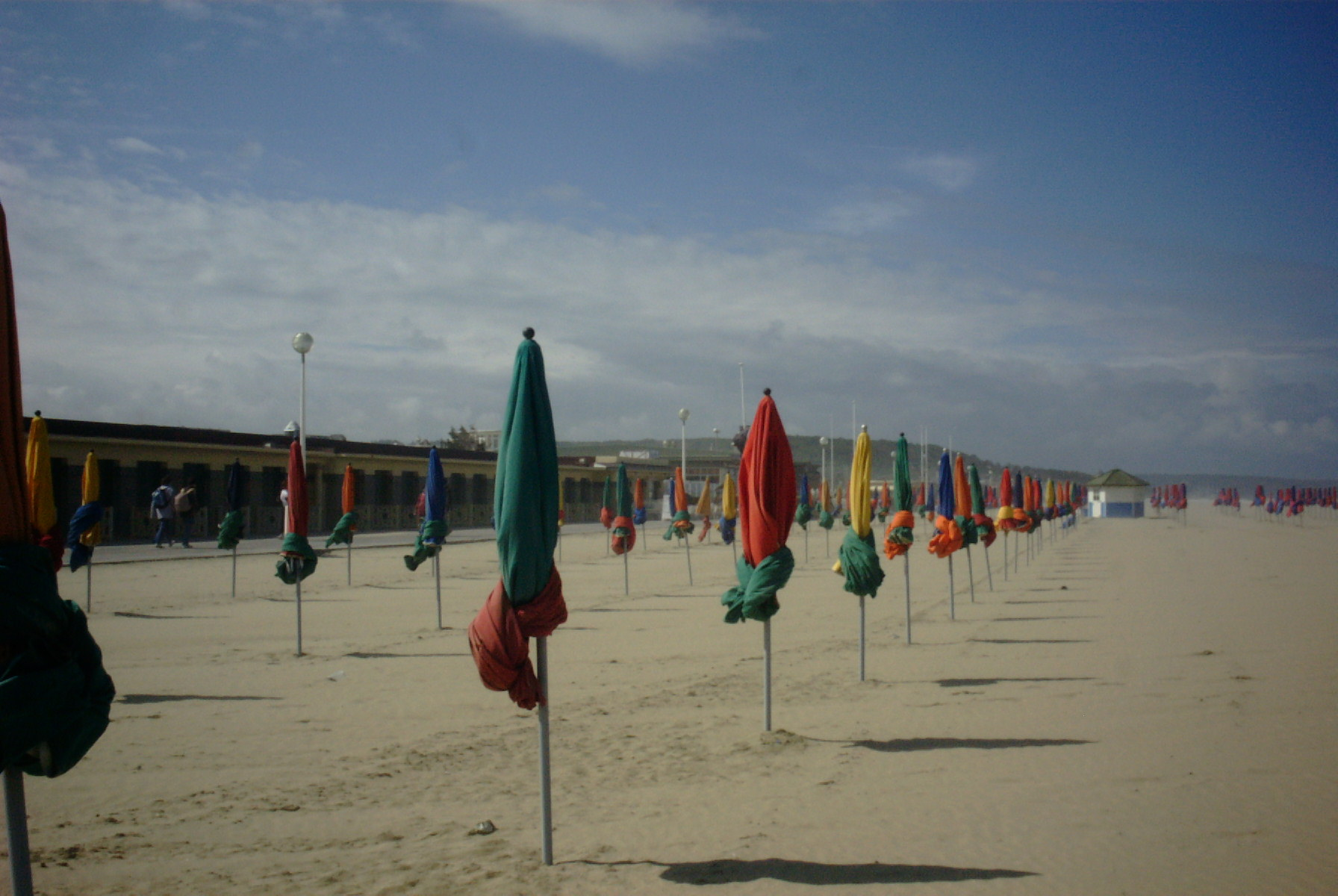
Beach in Deauville

- In 1923, the Promenade des Planches was created and finalized. This refers to the wooded boardwalk that parallels the seaside.
- In 1926, Eugene Corniché died. His position as director of Deauville's grand establishments was filled by Francois André.
- In 1929, the construction of l"Hotel du Golf was paired with major renovations and expansions to the golf course itself, as decided by Francois André. The hotel and golf course are situated on the outskirts of the town.
- In 1931, only 7 kilometres (4.3 mi) from the centre of town, Deauville – Saint-Gatien Airport was inaugurated. This was a pivotal event in Deauville's history, specifically in terms of tourism, as now London was only a 2-hour trip from Deauville.
- On 19 July 1936, the Deauville Grand Prix was held on a 3.7 kilometres (2.3 mi) circuit which used the road along the seafront and the Boulevard Eugène Cornuché. Drivers and spectators had reservations about the narrowness of the circuits and the sharp 90-degree corners. Approaching three-quarter distance, the E.R.A. of Marcel Lehoux clipped the wheel of the Alfa Romeo driven by Giuseppe Farina, resulting in both cars crashing. Farina was not seriously injured, but Lehoux was thrown out of his car, suffering a fractured skull, and died on the way to the hospital. Earlier in the race, Albert Chambost had crashed his Maserati. He was seriously injured, and succumbed to his injuries in hospital a few days later. This was the only running of the Deauville Grand Prix.

The combination of the national financial crisis and World War II ensured Deauville would not regain its stature as a resort town until the 1950s. During the Second World War, the German Army occupied Deauville. Villas, hotels, and the casino were all occupied or used to some extent by the German forces. Following the invasion of Allied forces on D-Day, the German troops were pushed out of Deauville and Normandy.

Following the war, Deauville leaned into its reputation for myth and exclusivity. Michel d'Ornano was established as the new mayor and Lucien Barriere succeeded his uncle Francois André at the head of the Hotels and Casinos of Deauville, and the town again became a centre for high society and celebrities. With scenes of award-winning movies being filmed in Deauville (such as Claude Lelouch's un Homme et une Femme) and consistent celebrity traffic, the town has renewed its status as an emblematic resort town of Europe.

=== Early history ===
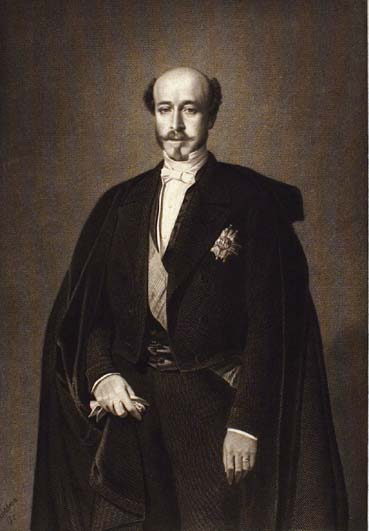
Charles Auguste Louis Joseph de Morny, 1st Duc de Morny, half brother of Emperor Napoleon III

The first reference to Deauville was in 1060. At this time the village was called A Enilla and resembled a fishing hamlet. "A Enilla" comes from the Germanic "Auwja Auwa", meaning wet meadow. The village was originally up on a hill and a few houses were built next to the St. Laurent chapel. Thanks to its situation near the coast, the village had a small harbour of little importance on the river Touques.

==== Duc de Morny ====
Deauville owes its greater prominence to the Duc de Morny. He described the village as: Cité calme, aux rue désertes, elle forme avec Trouville, animée et bruyante, un contraste absolu. Mais ce manque de vie n'est, en réalité, qu'apparent, car de magnifiques propriétés, de même que les délicieux jardins qui les entourent, sont entretnus avec un soin on ne peut plus raffiné. In English: "A quiet town, with deserted streets, it forms a complete contrast with the busy and noisy Trouville. But this lack of life is, in reality, only apparent, because the magnificent properties, and their delicious gardens, are maintained with a care that could not be more refined."

==== Development ====
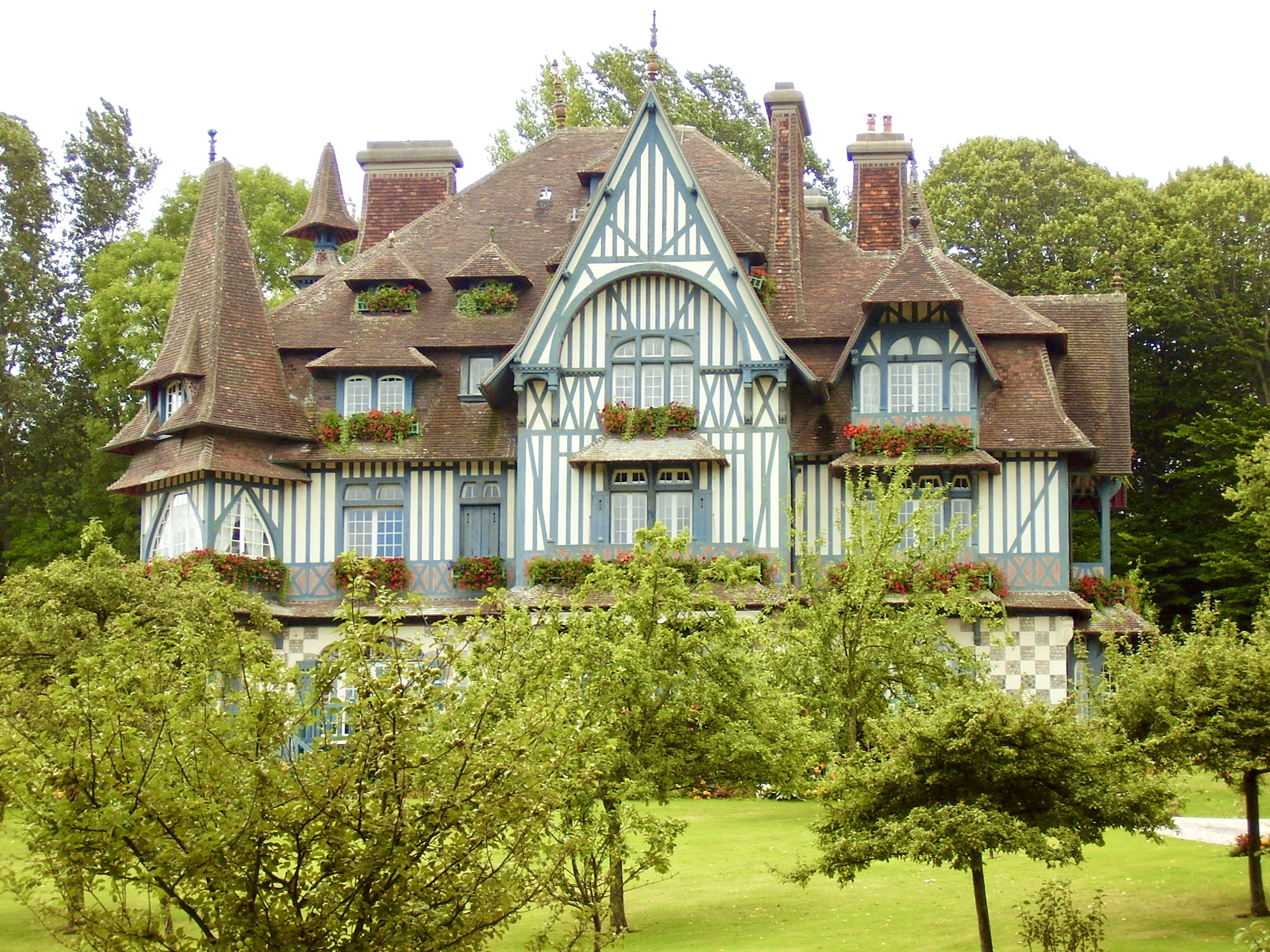
Villa Strassburger

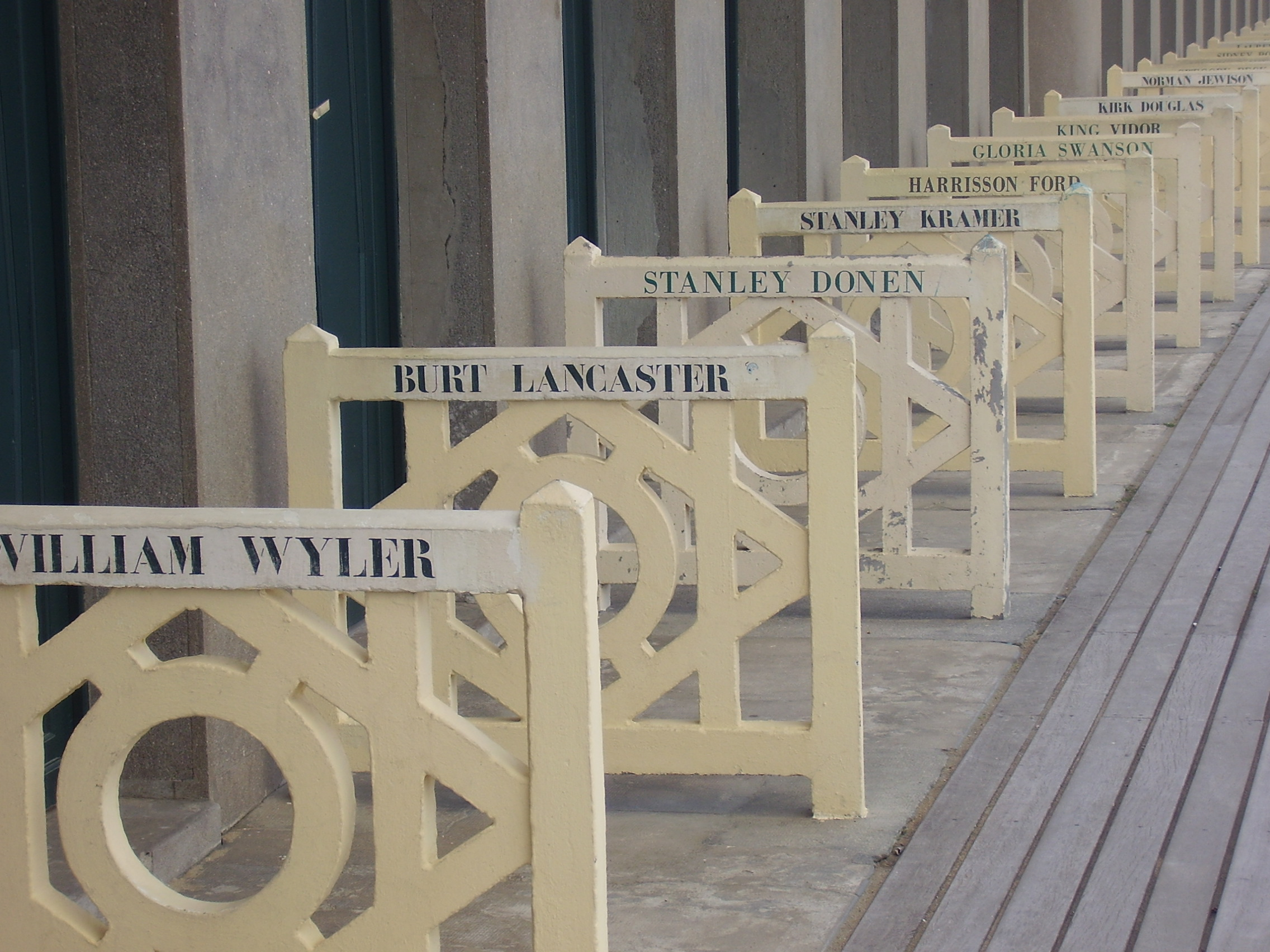
Promenade des Planches, where beach closets are dedicated to famous actors and moviemakers that have come to Deauville

In 1855 land was being bought at 5 centimes/m^{2}; in 1862 the same land was worth 1 franc/m^{2}, representing the transition from marsh to buildable land.

It was in 1858 that Doctor Oliffe, who owned a villa in Trouville, decided to create a "town of pleasure" on the sand dunes and in 1862 the first stone of today's Deauville was laid.

Together with banker Armand Donon, the duc bought 2.4 square kilometres (0.93 sq mi) of marsh and dunes for 800,000 francs. The Touques was still unchannelled but during the Second Empire the low tides permitted the construction of walls. In the 1860s visits by Napoleon III made the coast of Normandy adjacent to Deauville fashionable, and soon speculators developed the infrastructure necessary to accommodate members of the Imperial court and the growing Parisian bourgeoisie.

The railway arrived at Trouville-sur-Mer in 1863. Using Trouville station, passengers could reach Deauville in six hours from Paris. Morny, who had influence at Court, had a hand in persuading the aristocracy that staying on the coast would benefit their health. Land was bought and large villas or even palaces were built. A casino and hotels soon followed, and rich tourists came in numbers. A common old joke among locals is that the wealthy bourgeoisie Frenchmen would keep their wife in Deauville and their mistress in Trouville, making light of the disparate socioeconomic statuses of Trouville, being a working class fishing village and Deauville, being home to exclusive shops and expensive real estate.

The locked harbour was excavated in 1866.

Deauville was left mostly unscathed during the First World War. It was during World War II and German Occupation that Deauville saw most of its leisure properties confiscated for use by the occupying force.

=== Modern times ===
During the 1960s, Deauville started to see more mass-market visitors. Nonetheless, the town and the surrounding coastline still contain high-profile seaside resorts, haven for the rich and famous as well as for the more discreet families of French high society such as the Rothschilds, who own a Norman manor near Deauville. Today, Deauville is easily accessible from Paris, in large part due to the extension of highway A132. From 26 to 27 May 2011, Deauville hosted the 37th G8 summit.

=== Deauville American Film Festival ===
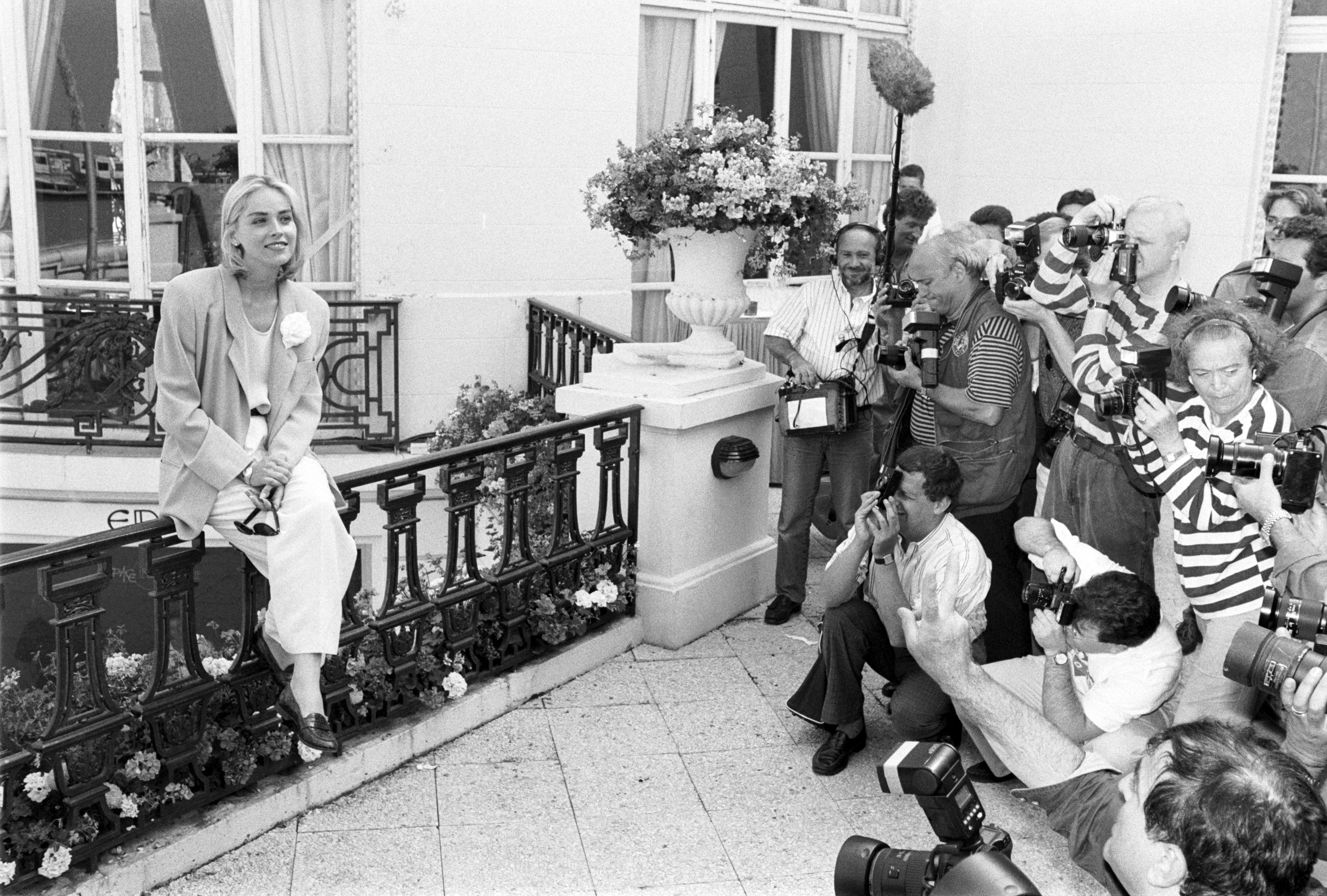
Sharon Stone's photo shoot in 1991.

In an effort to prolong the summer season, Lucien Barriere and Michel d'Ornano agreed to sponsor Lionel Chouchan and Andre Halimi's idea of a film festival that specifically promoted American films, including both big-budget and independent features.

The festival was established in 1975 and The Reincarnation of Peter Proud was the first film to be shown in the festival's history. Since then, the festival has continued to promote American cinematography and bring American and European stars to Normandy. The festival, not known for its competitive nature, began to hand out awards in 1995. In 2014 the Festival celebrated its 40th year.

== Sport ==
=== Horse culture ===
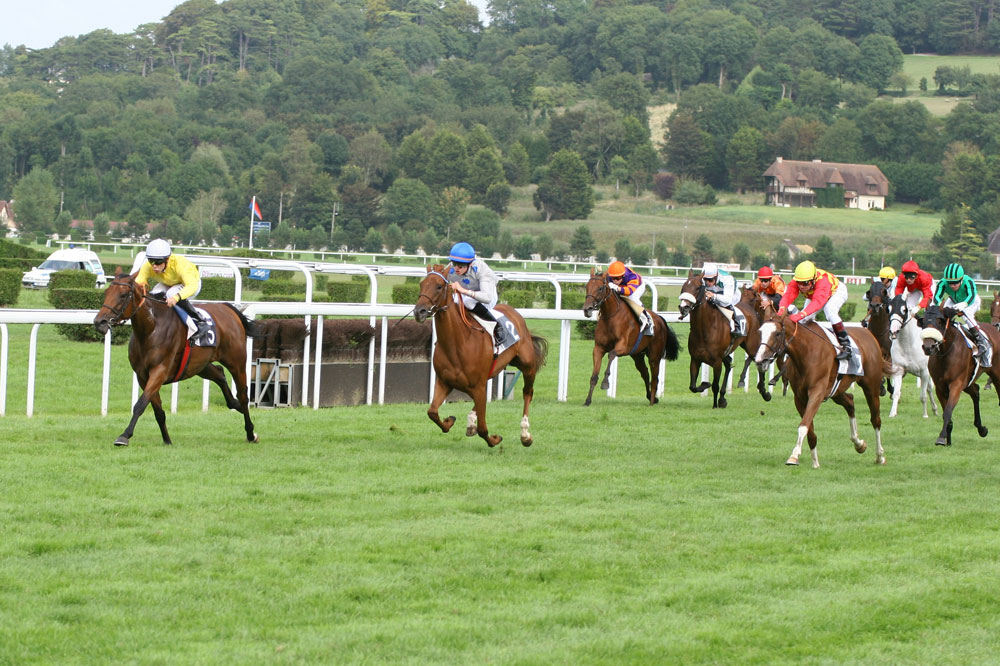
Horse Race at Clairefontaine Hippodrome

Home to the Deauville-La Touques Racecourse, the countryside around Deauville is the main horse breeding region in France and home to numerous stud farms. As a result, the city is twinned with Lexington, Kentucky and County Kildare in Ireland, both of which are world leaders in breeding thoroughbred racehorses. The important Ventes de Deauville yearling auction is held in mid-August each year at Deauville.

Deauville is internationally known for its horse culture, its famous tracks, Yearling sales and its multiple Group One annual races. The two famous tracks of Deauville are Deauville la Touques and Clairefontaine: these tracks are active during the months of January, July, August, October, and December.

The three most important races that occur in Deauville ever year are Le Maurice de Gheest, Le Jacques le Marois, and Le Morny. More recently, Le Prix d'Astarte, (Prix Rothschild) and Le Prix Romanet have gained more prestige in the racing world. Le Grand Prix de Deauville, though not a Group One race, remains very prestigious; since its origin the winner's names and emblems are posted on the walls of the grand hall of the race track.

Today Deauville also hosts competitions other than racing. These competitions include polo tournaments, horse shows, and the European Championship of Miniature Horses.

=== Football ===
The town has a football club, AS Trouville-Deauville-Villers who play at the stade du commandant Hébert.

== Population ==
Historical population

Year	Pop.	±% p.a.
1793	96	—
1800	80	−2.57%
1806	100	+3.79%
1821	86	−1.00%
1831	107	+2.21%
1836	103	−0.76%
1841	94	−1.81%
1846	119	+4.83%
1851	121	+0.33%
1856	107	−2.43%
1861	113	+1.10%
1866	1,150	+59.05%
1872	1,246	+1.35%
1876	1,514	+4.99%
1881	2,044	+6.19%
1886	2,228	+1.74%
1891	2,532	+2.59%
1896	2,522	−0.08%
1901	2,874	+2.65%

Year	Pop.	±% p.a.
1906	3,356	+3.15%
1911	3,824	+2.65%
1921	3,849	+0.07%
1926	4,208	+1.80%
1931	4,827	+2.78%
1936	4,663	−0.69%
1946	5,683	+2.00%
1954	5,211	−1.08%
1962	5,051	−0.39%
1968	5,232	+0.59%
1975	5,664	+1.14%
1982	4,682	−2.68%
1990	4,261	−1.17%
1999	4,364	+0.27%
2007	4,005	−1.07%
2012	3,775	−1.18%
2017	3,604	−0.92%
2023	3,539	−0.30%

Source: EHESS and INSEE (1968-2023)

== Notable people ==
- Xavier Marchand (1973), swimming champion

=== Deaths ===
- Eugène Boudin, painter, 8 August 1898
- Jean-Baptiste Berlier, engineer, in 1911
- Ford Madox Ford, British writer, 26 June 1939
- Gaston Jèze, judge, 5 August 1953
- Léon Chertok, psychiatrist, July 1991
- Rita Cadillac, singer, actress, 4 April 1995
- Alfred Sirven, businessman, 12 February 2005
- Sacha Briquet, comedian, 17 July 2010

=== Residents ===
- Billionaire couple Chryss Goulandris and Tony O'Reilly, the former a major horse breeder (with a stud near Deauville) and Greek shipping heiress, and the latter an Irish media magnate and controlling shareholder of Waterford Wedgwood – the couple own a château in the area, reputed to be where William the Conqueror planned the invasion of England, and have a major residence at Kilcullen near twin town Kildare, Ireland.
- French fashion designer Yves Saint Laurent had one of his homes in Deauville. All of his homes which he shared with a succession of French bulldogs, always named Moujik, were lavishly decorated and filled with antiques and artwork by his favourite artists, who included Picasso, Cocteau, Braque and Christian Bérard.

== List of films shot in Deauville ==
Weekend Wives, 1928

- Bob le flambeur, from Jean-Pierre Melville, with Isabelle Corey, Daniel Cauchy, Roger Duchesne, 1956
- Assassins et voleurs, from Sacha Guitry, with Michel Serrault and Jean Poiret, 1957
- Le Baron de l'écluse, from Jean Delannoy, with Jean Gabin, 1960
- Un singe en hiver, from Henri Verneuil, with Jean Gabin, Jean-Paul Belmondo, Suzanne Flon and Noël Roquevert, 1962
- Nous irons à Deauville, from Francis Rigaud, with Louis from Funès and Michel Serrault, 1962
- A Man and a Woman, from Claude Lelouch, with Anouk Aimée and Jean-Louis Trintignant, 1966
- The Friends (Les Amis), from Gérard Blain, with Philippe March and Yann Favre, 1971
- Je suis timide mais je me soigne, from Pierre Richard, with l'auteur, Aldo Maccione, Mimi Coutelier and Jacques François, 1978
- Attention ! Une femme peut en cacher une autre, from Georges Lautner, with Miou-Miou, Roger Hanin and Eddy Mitchell, 1983
- A Man and a Woman: 20 Years Later, from Claude Lelouch, with Jean-Louis Trintignant, Anouk Aimée, Richard Berry, 1986
- A Foreign Field, from Charles Sturridge with Alec Guinness, Leo Mckern, Geraldine Chaplin, Lauren Bacall, Jeanne Moreau, John Randolph and Edward Herrmann. 1993
- La Vérité si je mens !, from Thomas Gilou, with Richard Anconina, Vincent Elbaz and Amira Casar, 1997
- La Vérité si je mens ! 2, from Thomas Gilou, with Richard Anconina, José Garcia, Bruno Solo and Gilbert Melki, 2001
- Qui perd gagne !, from Laurent Bénégui, with Thierry Lhermitte and Elsa Zylberstein, 2004
- Trivial, from Sophie Marceau, with Marceau and Christopher Lambert, 2007
- Mesrine, l'ennemi public n°1, from Jean-François Richet, with Vincent Cassel, 2008
- Coco Before Chanel, d'Anne Fontaine, with Audrey Tautou, Alessandro Nivola, Marie Gillain, 2009

== Popular culture ==
- F. Scott Fitzgerald mentions Deauville in The Great Gatsby as a place Tom Buchanan and Daisy visit on their honeymoon.
- Deauville was probably the location inspiration for the fictional casino in Ian Fleming's Casino Royale. The first of the James Bond series largely takes part in a Casino – Fleming had played at Deauville as a young man, and sets his tale of Bond versus Soviet agents in a fictional French gambling resort, drawing parallels with an actual World War II visit he had made to a Portuguese casino (Palacio Estoril) whilst working for the British secret service.
- In the 1933 movie musical, 42nd Street, Ginger Rogers' character tries to pass herself off as a wealthy English socialite and mentions a previous vacation in Deauville.
- The screen adaptation of Agatha Christie's Murder on the Links was set in Deauville.
- The Deauville casino is the setting for the heist in Bob le flambeur, directed by Jean-Pierre Melville. It is also held-up in the 2008 movie Mesrine: L'ennemi public № 1.
- Deauville was the setting for part of A Man and a Woman.
- Deauville, together with Cabourg and Trouville, provides the basis for the Norman coastal resort of Balbec in Marcel Proust's À la recherche du temps perdu (Remembrance of Things Past). For a discussion of Proust's use of Norman locations and the interplay between the social structures of his novel and the region's place in French social history, see https://web.archive.org/web/20070620072342/http://fds.oup.com/www.oup.co.uk/pdf/0-19-925688-8.pdf
- Deauville was a popular vacation spot for Coco Chanel during her affair with Boy Capel. The two opened her second shop there, which was where Chanel transitioned from hatmaking to clothing.
- Deauville was the setting for the first act of the play Private Lives by Noël Coward.
- Deauville is mentioned as the departure point for Lord Palmerdale's party prior to being shipwrecked in the Doctor Who serial Horror of Fang Rock. The character Adelaide Lessage regrets leaving Deauville as the deaths begin to mount.
- Air France has named one of its Airbus A350 Aircraft (F-HTYR) after Deauville

== Song prize and literary prize ==
The Prix de Deauville for songs and books are awarded in April annually. The song prize was a notable event in the late 1940s and 1950s. The prix littéraire de la Ville de Deauville in 2016 was awarded to Virginie Despentes.

== International relations ==
Deauville is twinned with:

- (United States) Lexington, Kentucky, USA
- Cowes, United Kingdom
- Eicklingen, Germany
- (Republic of Ireland) Kildare, Ireland
- Pinamar, Argentina

== Events ==
- Deauville Asian Film Festival
- Deauville American Film Festival

== See also ==
- Communes of the Calvados department
- André Bizette-Lindet
- Villa Strassburger
