= Anne-Sophie Bion =

French film editor

- Anne-Sophie Bion at the ACE Eddie Awards 2012
- Occupation: Film editor
- Known for: The Artist (2012)
- Website: https://cosmictalents.com/anne-sophie-bion/featured

Anne-Sophie Bion is a French film editor best known for her work in the 2011 silent film, The Artist, directed by Michel Hazanavicius. Hazanavicius and Bion were both nominated for Best Film Editing for their work on The Artist.

== Film career ==
Bion earned an Associate degree in video editing. Her first job was at Eurosport, a sports broadcasting network. She went back to school for her Bachelor degree in film studies and took a job as a technical assistant at a post-production company.

Jean-François Richet became her mentor. Bion said about working with Richet that "Every morning, I sat next to him and watched him watch the dailies...That's how I really learned to cut."

In late 2010, Bion met Michel Hazanavicius, who was seeking a film editor for his next project (what would become The Artist). Bion said she and Hazanavicius hit it off immediately.

On 24 January 2012, Bion received an Academy Award nomination for Best Film Editing for her work on The Artist. She was jointly nominated with Hazanavicius in the category.

In addition to working on movies, Bion has also worked on commercial shoots for companies like Amazon, Gucci, Canal+, and Citroën.

== Filmography ==
Year	Film	Director	Notes
2011	The Artist	Michel Hazanavicius	ACE Eddie; Phoenix Film Critics Society Award for Best Editing; Nominated—Academy Award for Best Film Editing; Nominated—Alliance of Women Film Journalists Award for Best Editing; Nominated—BAFTA Award for Best Editing; Nominated—Broadcast Film Critics Association Award for Best Editing; Nominated—César Award for Best Editing; Nominated—San Diego Film Critics Society Award for Best Editing
2011	War of the Buttons	Christophe Barratier	
2012	Stars 80	Frédéric Forestier; Thomas Langmann	
2013	Chinese Puzzle	Cédric Klapisch	
2014	The Search	Michel Hazanavicius	
2017	Back to Burgundy	Cédric Klapisch	
2022	Rise	Cédric Klapisch	Nominated—César Award for Best Editing
