= Richard Anconina =

French actor (born 1953)

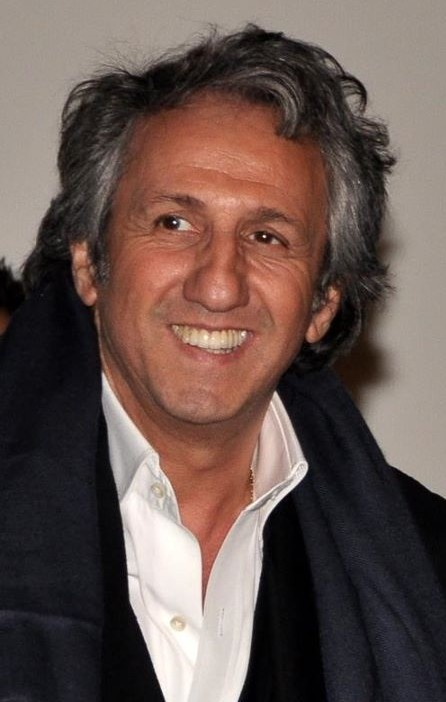
- Richard Anconina in 2012
- Born: 28 January 1953 (age 73); Paris, France
- Occupation: Actor
- Years active: 1977 - present
- Awards: César Award for Best Male Revelation, César Award for Best Supporting Actor (both 1983)

Richard Anconina (French: [ʁi.ʃaʁ ɑ̃.kɔ.ni.na]; born 28 January 1953) is a French actor. He had his breakthrough role in the 1983 film So Long, Stooge, for which he won two César Awards. His other successful films include Police (1985) and Itinerary of a Spoiled Child (1988), as well as the comedy Would I Lie to You? (1997) and its two sequels.

== Biography ==
Richard Anconina was born in Paris to a working-class family. His parents were Moroccan Jews of Spanish descent. He worked several odd jobs, including delivery man and hospital orderly, before turning to acting.

Anconina had his breakthrough role in 1983 with the film So Long, Stooge (Tchao Pantin), directed by Claude Berri, where he co-starred with Coluche. For his performance as a petty, doomed drug dealer, Anconina was nominated for the César Award for Best Supporting Actor and the César Award for Best Male Revelation, eventually winning both.

In the course of the 1980s, Anconina appeared in several other successful films. He notably co-starred with Christopher Lambert and Catherine Deneuve in Love Songs (1984), with Gérard Depardieu and Sophie Marceau in Police (1985) and with Jean-Paul Belmondo in Itinerary of a Spoiled Child (1988). For his latter film, he was nominated for the César Award for Best Actor, though it went to his co-star Belmondo. During the 1990s, several of his films were box-office failures but he achieved success again in 1997 by starring in the comedy Would I Lie to You?. He reprised his role in two sequels to that film, released in 2001 and 2012.

== Filmography ==
- 1977 : Comment se faire réformer directed by Philippe Clair
- 1978 : Les Réformés se portent bien directed by Philippe Clair
- 1979 : Démons de midi directed by Christian Paureilhe
- 1980 : Le Bar du téléphone directed by Claude Barrois – Boum-Boum
- 1980 : À vingt minutes par le R.E.R.
- 1980 : Inspecteur la Bavure directed by Claude Zidi – Philou
- 1981 : L'Arme au bleu
- 1981 : Asphalte directed by Denis Amar – un pilleur
- 1981 : La Provinciale directed by Claude Goretta
- 1981 : Le Petit Pommier directed by Liliane de Kermadec
- 1981 : Une robe noire pour un tueur directed by José Giovanni – un jeune drogué
- 1981 : Le Choix des armes directed by Alain Corneau – Dany
- 1982 : Emmenez-moi au théâtre : L'étrangleur s'excite
- 1983 : Le Battant directed by Alain Delon – Samatan
- 1983 : Cap Canaille directed by Juliet Berto – Mayolles
- 1983 : Le Jeune Marié directed by Bernard Stora – Baptiste
- 1983 : Une pierre dans la bouche directed by Jean-Louis Leconte – Marc
- 1983 : So Long, Stooge (Tchao Pantin) directed by Claude Berri – Bensoussan
- 1984 : L'Intrus directed by Irène Jouannet – Gilles
- 1984 : Love Songs (Paroles et musique) directed by Elie Chouraqui – Michel
- 1985 : Partir, revenir directed by Claude Lelouch – Vincent Rivière
- 1985 : Police directed by Maurice Pialat – Lambert
- 1986 : Zone rouge directed by Robert Enrico – Jeff Montelier
- 1986 : Le Môme directed by Alain Corneau – Willie
- 1987 : Lévy et Goliath directed by Gérard Oury – Moïse Levy
- 1988 : What if Gargiulo Finds Out? directed by Elvio Porta – Ferdinando
- 1988 : Envoyez les violons directed by Roger Andrieux – Frédéric Segal
- 1988 : Itinerary of a Spoiled Child (Itinéraire d'un enfant gâté) directed by Claude Lelouch – Albert Duvivier
- 1990 : Miss Missouri directed by Elie Chouraqui – Nathan Leven
- 1990 : The Little Gangster (Le Petit criminel) directed by Jacques Doillon – le flic
- 1991 : A quoi tu penses-tu? directed by Didier Kaminka – Pierre
- 1992 : La Place du père
- 1994 : Fall from Grace (TV)
- 1994 : Coma – Julien
- 1996 : Hercule et Sherlock directed by Jeannot Szwarc – Bruno
- 1997 : Would I Lie to You? (La Vérité si je mens!) directed by Thomas Gilou – Eddie Vuibert
- 1997 : Les Héritiers
- 2000 : Six-Pack directed by Alain Berbérian – Nathan
- 2001 : Would I Lie to You? 2 (La Vérité si je mens ! 2) directed by Thomas Gilou – Eddie Vuibert
- 2002 : Gangsters directed by Olivier Marchal – Franck Chaïevski
- 2004 : Alive directed by Frédéric Berthe – Alex Meyer
- 2007 : Dans les cordes directed by Magaly Richard-Serrano – Joseph
- 2010 : Camping 2 directed by Fabien Onteniente – Jean-Pierre Savelli
- 2012 : Would I Lie to You? 3 (La vérité si je mens! 3) directed by Thomas Gilou – Eddie Vuibert
- 2012 : Stars 80 directed by Frédéric Forestier and Thomas Langmann – Vincent
- 2016 : The law of Christophe, TV Movie directed by Jacques Malaterre – Christophe Vitari
- 2017 : Stars 80 la suite, directed by Frédéric Forestier and Thomas Langmann – Vincent
- 2020 : Un mauvais garçon, directed by Xavier Durringer (TV)
