= Love Songs (1984 film) =

1984 film by Élie Chouraqui

- French: Paroles et Musique
- Directed by: Élie Chouraqui
- Written by: Élie Chouraqui
- Produced by: Élie Chouraqui; Marie Chouraqui
- Starring: Catherine Deneuve; Christopher Lambert; Richard Anconina; Jacques Perrin; Nick Mancuso; Charlotte Gainsbourg
- Cinematography: Robert Alazraki
- Edited by: Noëlle Boisson
- Music by: Michel Legrand; Gene McDaniels
- Production companies: 7 Films Cinéma; FR3; CIS (Canada)
- Distributed by: Acteurs Auteurs Associés; Soprofilms
- Release date: 19 December 1984 (France)
- Running time: 109 minutes
- Countries: France; Canada
- Languages: French; English

Love Songs (French: Paroles et Musique, literally Words and Music) is a 1984 comedy-drama romance film directed and written by Élie Chouraqui and starring Catherine Deneuve and Christopher Lambert. It is also the film debut of Charlotte Gainsbourg.

== Cast ==
- Catherine Deneuve as Margaux Marker
- Christopher Lambert as Jeremy
- Richard Anconina as Michel
- Jacques Perrin as Yves
- Nick Mancuso as Peter Marker
- Dayle Haddon as Corinne
- Charlotte Gainsbourg as Charlotte Marker
- Dominique Lavanant as Florence
- Franck Ayas as Elliot Marker
- Nelly Borgeaud as Julie
- László Szabó as Alain
- Lionel Rocheman as Gruber
- Stephanie Biddle as a Waitress/Singer
- Charles Biddle Jr. as a Waiter/Singer
- Didier Hoffmann as Robin
- Inigo Lezzi as Jean-Paul
- Julie Ravix as Claire
- Diane Markowitz as Leslie
- Yumi Fujimori as Switchboard Operator
- Warren 'Slim' Williams as Bus Driver

== Release ==
The film was released in France in 1984 by Acteurs Auteurs Associés and Soprafilms and in 1986 in America by International Spectrafilm. It was released on DVD in France in 2002 by Warner Vision France and in America in 2008 by Somerville House.

== Soundtrack ==
The soundtrack was composed by Michel Legrand and Gene McDaniels, with musical coordination by Gilbert Marouani. It was produced by LEM America Inc. under the direction of McDaniels, for WEA Filipacchi Music. It was recorded at M1 Recording Studios in New York. The cover design is by François Plassat and was photographed by Bruno Clergue. Tracks 1, 2, 4, 6, 7 and 10 have vocals by Guy Thomas and Terry Lauber (in the original French film, the vocals are by the actors Christopher Lambert and Richard Anconina).

Side one
No.	Title	Length
1.	"From The Heart"	4:20
2.	"We Can Dance"	3:50
3.	"One More Moment (Instrumental)"	0:50
4.	"Human Race"	4:30
5.	"Thème (3)"	1:10

Side two
No.	Title	Length
1.	"One More Moment"	2:30
2.	"Leave It To Me"	3:54
3.	"Thème (12)"	1:10
4.	"I'm With You Now"	3:55
5.	"Psychic Flash"	5:05

== Awards and nominations ==
Year	Organization	Category	Recipients and nominees	Result
1985	César Award	César Award for Best Original Music	Michel Legrand	Nominated
