= Les Chevaliers du fiel =

French comedy duo

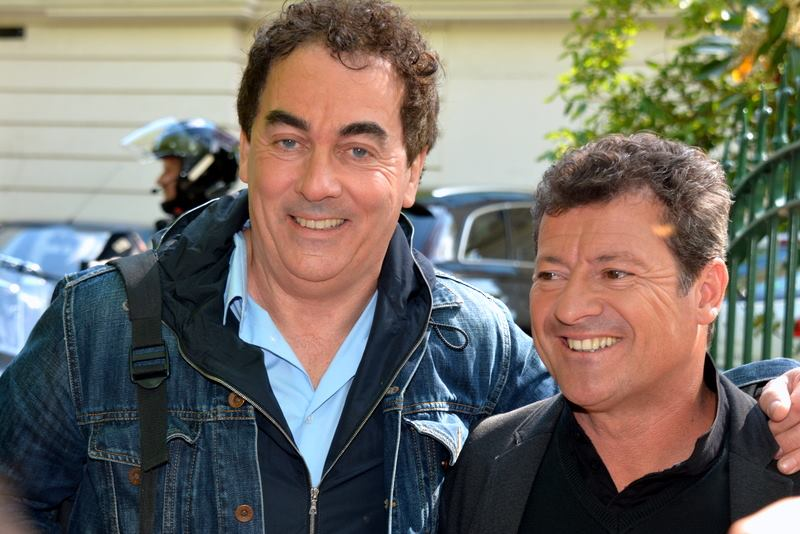
Eric Carrière (left) and Francis Ginibre in 2016.

Les Chevaliers du fiel is a duo of French comedians, composed by Eric Carrière and Francis Ginibre.

== Founding ==
At the end of the 1980s, Eric Carrière, PhD in sociology, and Francis Ginibre, graduated from the National French School of Beaux-Arts, went on stage in a "cave-spectacle", little room in a pub, in Toulouse. After their meeting with Gilles Petit in 1984, they created their own first show, "Le détournement d’avion le plus fou de l’année" (1984) which was successful and gave birth to the Chevaliers du fiel (3 comedians until 1990).

Their first apparitions on TV were on TLT (a local television channel from Toulouse). After having participated for many years at the Festival d’Avignon (French exhibition of theater shows in Avignon), the duo of comedians appeared in Paris. They went on stage in September 1995 at the Européen (Parisian theater) but their show wasn’t a success. This failure was due to the famous strike in Parisian public transport. This bad period was going to turn into financial difficulties.

But the duo didn’t give up, and, in 1996, they performed for three weeks at the theater Grévin (another Parisian theater). Actually, the success of their show enabled them to be on stage for four months. During the same year, their humorous song "La Simca 1000" came out and was sold in 400.000 copies for six months.

In 1997, they created a new show performed at the Grand Palais des Glaces (famous theater in Paris) and went on a tour of 100 representations with 100 000 spectators. In 1998, they went on stage for one week at the Casino de Paris. In January 1999, the duo performed at the Olympia, ensured their tour and produced a video pick up at the Zenith of Paris.

== 2000s ==
In the 2000s, les Chevaliers du Fiel confirmed the success of their humor. In 2000, they went on stage at the Casino de Paris and ensured a tour of 140 shows. The duo of comedians broadcast a daily show on Sud Radio (a French radio).

In 2001, they created « Repas de famille » in Toulouse and about 4.000 spectators went to see the first representations. The show became a tour all over France. At the same time, they broadcast a daily show on the French radio Rires & Chansons. In February 2001, they published their book: "Les Chevaliers du fiel balancent tout! ". A videotape and a DVD of their show "Repas de famille" came out during the same year. In 2002, they were awarded the Golden Video for their show "Repas de famille". As from 7 November, they were at the Théâtre Trévise, in Paris, and ensured another tour in France. In 2004, they went on a national tour in France, and their DVD « special South » came out.

In 2006, les Chevaliers du Fiel kept went on their tour and published a book called "365 Histoires drôles". They went on stage at the festival d’Avignon during all July at the theater Rouge Gorge. The duo obtained very big audience numbers on Sud Radio.

== 2010s ==
In 2010, they were still working for Sud Radio. On October 13, 2010, the direct broadcasting of their show « Bienvenue chez les Chevaliers du Fiel", anthology of their sketches, allowed France 4 (a French TV channel) to obtain 850.000 viewers. As from the autumn of 2010, they did a new show: « Les vacances d’enfer". They were at the Théâtre du Gymnase Marie Bell at the beginning of 2011.

At the end of 2010, they bought the theater "La Comédie de Toulouse".In the summer of 2012, they started shooting their first full-length, the adaptation of their play "Repas de famille"." Since January 2013, they have been performing their show "Croisière d’enfer" which is simply the sequel to their play "Vacances d’enfer".
