= Stars 80 =

- Theatrical release poster
- Directed by: Frédéric Forestier; Thomas Langmann
- Written by: Karine Angeli; Pascal Bourdiaux
- Produced by: Thomas Langmann; Emmanuel Montamat
- Starring: Richard Anconina; Patrick Timsit; Bruno Lochet
- Cinematography: Michel Abramowicz
- Edited by: Anne-Sophie Bion; Thibaut Damade
- Music by: Marc Chouarain
- Production companies: La Petite Reine; Studio 37; TF1 Films Production
- Distributed by: Warner Bros. Pictures
- Release date: 24 October 2012
- Running time: 107 minutes
- Country: France
- Language: French
- Box office: $15.9 million

Stars 80 is a 2012 French comedy film directed by Frédéric Forestier and Thomas Langmann.

== Cast ==
- Richard Anconina as Vincent Richet
- Patrick Timsit as Antoine Miller
- Bruno Lochet as Willy
