= Aure Atika =

French actress, writer and director

- Aure Atika at the 2026 Cannes Film Festival
- Born: 12 July 1970 (age 56); Monte Estoril, Portugal
- Occupation: Film actress
- Years active: 1979; 1992; 1995–present
- Partner: Philippe Zdar
- Website: www.aureatika.com/home.html

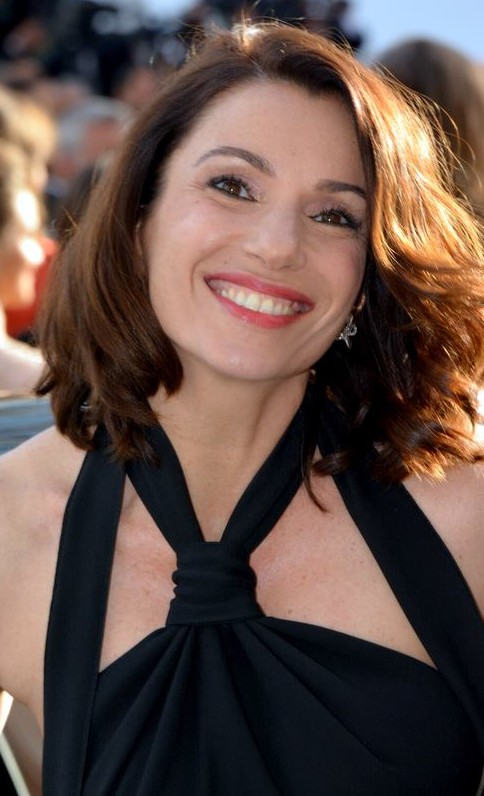
Aure Atika at the 2017 Cannes Film Festival

Aure Atika (born 12 July 1970) is a French actress, writer, and director.

== Life and career ==
The daughter of Jewish-Moroccan Ode Atika Bitton and an unknown father. Her mother told her she was conceived with Michel Fournier when both had taken drugs. Her father did not recognize her and a DNA-test confirmed the lack of relationship. Atika was born in Portugal and grew up in Paris. She won the 2004 Best French-Language Short Film Award at the Créteil International Women's Film Festival for À quoi ça sert de voter écolo? (What's the Point of Voting Green?) (2003) and was nominated for the 2010 César Award for Best Supporting Actress for Mademoiselle Chambon (2009). Atika has one daughter, Angelica (February 2002), with Philippe Zdar of house music group Cassius.

== Filmography ==
=== Film ===
Year	Title	Role	Notes
1979	The Adolescent	uncredited	
1992	Sam suffit	Eva	
1995	Toujours les filles souffriront d'amourlo		Short film
1996	Homo automobilis		Short film
1997	Ecchymose		Short film
1997	Just Do It		Short film
1997	La Vérité si je mens !	Karine Benchetrit-Mimran	
1997	The Secret of Polichinelle	Aure	
1997	Long Live the Republic	Sabine	
1998	(G)rève party	Julie	
1998	Bimboland	Alex Baretto	
1999	Influence Peddling	Sandrine Anthen	
1999	Une vie de prince	Josée	
2000	Highway Melody	Périnne	
2000	Poetical Refugee	Nassera	
2001	La Vérité si je mens ! 2	Karine Benchetrit-Mimran	
2003	Mister V.	Cécile	
2004	Le quattro porte del deserto	Dassine	
2004	Turn Left at the End of the World	Simone Toledano	
2004	Le convoyeur	Isabelle	
2004	3 Dancing Slaves	Emilie	
2004	Testament	Nora	
2005	Bonbon au poivre	Mélanie	
2005	The Beat That My Heart Skipped	Aline	
2006	OSS 117: Cairo, Nest of Spies	Princess Al Tarouk	
2006	Hey Good Looking !	Léa	
2007	Ill Wind	Frédérique	
2007	La Vie d'artiste	Manager of Hippopotamus	
2007	Fear(s) of the Dark	Laura	Voice
2008	48 heures par jour	Marianne	
2008	Versailles	Nadine	
2008	Crossfire	Marianne	
2009	Mademoiselle Chambon	Anne-Marie	
2009	Sticky Fingers	Maddy	
2010	Copacabana	Lydie	
2011	Skylab		
2013	Nesma	Claire Slimane	
2014	Avis de mistral	Magali	
2015	Dad in Training	Judith	
2017	The Nature of Time		
2017	L'Un dans l'autre	Aimée	
2019	Souviens-toi de nous	Carole	
2020	Into the World	Sylvie	
2020	10 Days with Dad	Isabelle Mercier	
2021	Rose	Sarah Goldberg	
2022	House of Lust	Delilah	
2024	Speak Out (Le Panache)	Giulia	
2025	Guess Who's Calling! (Le Répondeur)	Clara	

=== As director ===
Year	Title	Role	Notes
2003	À quoi ça sert de voter écolo?	Writer/Director	Short, title transl., "What's the point of voting Green?"
2007	De l'amour	Director	Short, title transl., "In Love"
2013	On ne badine pas avec Rosette	Director	Short, title transl., "You do not mess with Rosette"

=== Television ===
Year	Title	Role	Notes
1999	Premières neiges	Juliette	
2001	Combats de femme – Libre à tout prix	Maud	
2012	World Without End	Queen Isabella	TV mini-series
2016	The Night Manager	Sophie (Sameera) Alekan	TV mini-series
2019	The Journey	Mysterious Woman	Super Bowl film

==== TV guest appearances ====
Year	Title	Role	Notes
1995–1996	Sexy Zap	Co-Host	"(segment "Ça se regarde)" (22 September 1995 episode); "(segment "Ça se regarde)" (5 January 1996 episode)
2001	Les enfants de la télé	Herself	12 January 2001 episode
2001–2006	Tout le monde en parle	Herself	3 March 2001 episode; 6 May 2006 episode
2005	Le juge est une femme	Céline	Ficelle (2005) TV episode
2005	Le grand journal de Canal+	Herself	7 April 2005 episode
2006	Tsunami: The Aftermath	Simone	Miniseries
2006	En aparté	Herself	30 April 2006 episode
2008	T'empêches tout le monde de dormir	Herself	1 episode
2014	Les hommes de l'ombre	Gabrielle Tackichieff	6 episodes
2017	Capitaine Marleau	Judith Garin	1 episode

== Awards and nominations ==
- award, 2004 Prix de la Fondation Beaumarchais, best short film, for À quoi ça sert de voter écolo? (2003).
- nomination, 2010 César du cinéma, for best supporting actress, for Mademoiselle Chambon (2009).
- nomination, 2014 Trophée francophone, for best actress, for Nesma (2013).
