= Speak Out (film) =

- French: Le Panache
- French: Dans la peau de Cyrano
- Directed by: Jennifer Devoldère
- Written by: Jennifer Devoldère; Cécile Sellam
- Based on: Being Cyrano by Nicolas Devort
- Produced by: Pierre-Louis Arnal; Thierry Desmichelle; Rémi Jimenez; Farid Lahouassa
- Starring: Joachim Arseguel; José Garcia; Aure Atika
- Cinematography: Jean-François Hensgens
- Edited by: Francis Vesin
- Music by: Adrien Durand
- Production company: Vertigo Productions
- Distributed by: SND Films; Immina Films
- Release date: 1 June 2024 (Vierzon)
- Running time: 93 minutes
- Country: France
- Language: French

Speak Out (French: Le Panache or French: Dans la peau de Cyrano) is a French comedy-drama film, directed by Jennifer Devoldère and released in 2024.

Adapted from Nicolas Devort's stage play Being Cyrano, the film stars Joachim Arseguel as Colin, a teenager with a stuttering problem who is feeling isolated and alone after starting at a new school following his parents' divorce, but who discovers a new path forward when his teacher M. Devarseau (José Garcia) casts him in the lead role in a school production of Cyrano de Bergerac, challenging Colin to break out of his shell and find new confidence in himself.

The cast also includes Aure Atika as Colin's mother Giulia, Tom Meusnier as his gay classmate Maxence and Eva-Rose Pacaud as Adelaide, a classmate who becomes a love interest for Colin, as well as Marie-Léa Diab, Neige de Maistre, Louis Brogniart, Claire Dumas, Vittoria Scognamiglio, Laetitia Spigarelli, Cédric Vieira, Maxime De Toledo and Daisy Miotello in supporting roles.

== Production ==
Due to the film's themes, Devoldère felt it was important to cast a real-life stutterer as Colin, and found Arseguel after he was referred to her by his speech therapist.

The film was shot in summer 2023, principally in the Auvergne-Rhône-Alpes region, including locations in Puy-de-Dôme, Riom and Clermont-Ferrand.

== Distribution ==
The film premiered on June 1, 2024, at the Festival du film de demain de Vierzon, before going into commercial release in French theatres in November 2024.

It was screened theatrically in the Canadian province of Quebec in spring 2025, under the Dans la peau de Cyrano title.

== Awards ==
Award	Year	Category	Recipient	Result	Ref.
Festival du film de demain de Vierzon	2024	Public Prize	Speak Out	Won	
Festival Jean-Carmet	2024	Best Supporting Actor	Tom Meusnier	Won	
Montreal International Children's Film Festival	2025	Children's Jury Prize	Speak Out	Won	
Festival de cinéma en famille de Québec	2025	Best Film	Speak Out	Won	
Festival de cinéma en famille de Québec	2025	Best Screenplay	Speak Out	Won	
Festival de cinéma en famille de Québec	2025	Best Film, Youth Jury Prize	Speak Out	Won	
Festival de cinéma en famille de Québec	2025	Best Direction, Youth Jury Prize	Speak Out	Won	
