= Michel Abramowicz =

French photographer and cinematographer

- Born: 24 January 1950 (age 76); Neuilly-sur-Seine, Hauts-de-Seine, France
- Occupation: Cinematographer
- Notable work: Capitães de Abril; The Thing

Michel Abramowicz (born 24 January 1950) is a French photographer and cinematographer.

== Career ==
He studied at the Paris Diderot University. Since then he has shot feature films, commercials and video clips. The DVD version of Taken was distributed with a feature commentary to which he contributed.

== Selected filmography ==
- 1990: La fille des collines
- 1991: Annabelle partagée
- 1993: Une journée chez ma mère
- 1993: Vent d'est
- 1995: État des lieux
- 1997: La ballade de Titus
- 2000: Capitães de Abril
- 2002: Sueurs
- 2003: Michel Vaillant
- 2005: Empire of the Wolves
- 2007: Ha-Sodot
- 2008: Taken
- 2008: Bonjour Sagan
- 2010: From Paris with Love
- 2010: The Matchmaker
- 2011: The Thing
- 2012: Stars 80
- 2013: The Wonders
- 2016: Past Life
- 2019: The Courier
