= José Garcia (actor) =

French actor and comedian (born 1966)

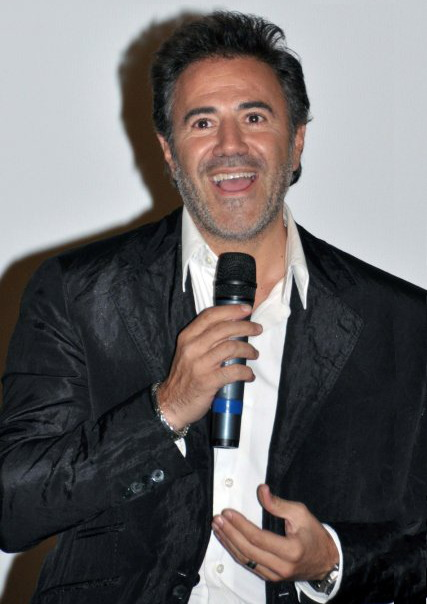
- Garcia in 2009
- Born: José Doval García; 17 March 1966 (age 60); Paris, France
- Other name: José Luis Garcia
- Education: Cours Florent
- Occupation: Actor
- Years active: 1989–present
- Spouse: Isabelle Pinelli (m. 1993; div. 2021)
- Children: 2

José Doval Garcia (Galician: [xoˈse doˈβal ɣaɾˈθia]; French: [ʒoze ɡaʁsja]; born 17 March 1966), sometimes credited as José Luis Garcia, is a French actor and comedian. He was nominated for a César Award for Best Actor for his performance in The Axe (2005), after previously being nominated for Best Male Revelation for Would I Lie to You? (1997).

== Early life and education ==
Garcia was born in Paris, France to Galician parents from O Carballiño, Ourense, who emigrated to the country escaping the Spanish Civil War and poverty. His parents named him after child singer and actor Joselito.

At age 20, he received two years of training in the Classe libre ("Free Class") for actors at the Cours Florent in Paris, with Francis Huster as a teacher. He completed his training through the Annie Fratellini Circus School (where he met his future wife Isabelle Doval) and taught in France following an Actors Studio course.

He also holds a degree in accounting, and served in the French Army in the 4th Dragoon Regiment.

== Career ==
Since 1989, Garcia has made acting appearances in over forty-five films. Additionally, he has made appearances, some in acting roles but mostly as himself, in over twenty television productions.

== Personal life ==
Garcia married actress Isabelle Pinelli and together had two daughters, Laurène and Thelma. They announced their divorce in 2021.

== Filmography ==
| Year | Title | Role | Director | Notes |
|---|---|---|---|---|
| 1989 | Mama, There's a Man in Your Bed | Worker | Coline Serreau | |
| 1990 | Mésaventures | Antoine | Stéphane Bertin | TV series (1 episode) |
| 1993 | Le tronc | | Bernard Faroux & Karl Zéro | |
| 1994 | Le Jour J | The Man | Denis Malleval | Short |
| 1995 | Élisa | Taxi Passenger | Jean Becker | |
| 1995 | J'ai niqué Couille Molle! | Voice | Patrick Menais | |
| 1995 | L'image du pouvoir | Lionel Julien | Denis Malleval | Short |
| 1995 | Les derniers mots | The Box Man | Yannick Saillet | Short |
| 1995 | Bons baisers de Suzanne | The Man | Christian Merret-Palmair | Short |
| 1995 | The Pebble and the Penguin | Rocko | Don Bluth & Gary Goldman | French Voice |
| 1996 | Beaumarchais | Figaro | Édouard Molinaro | |
| 1996 | Caméléone | Little Cop | Benoît Cohen | |
| 1996 | Coeur de cible | Redif | Laurent Heynemann | TV movie |
| 1997 | La Vérité si je mens ! | Serge Benamou | Thomas Gilou | Nominated – César Award for Most Promising Actor |
| 1997 | Tout doit disparaître | Detective Colle | Philippe Muyl | |
| 1997 | Les démons de Jésus | Bruno Piacentini | Bernie Bonvoisin | |
| 1997 | Mauvais genre | The Model Maker | Laurent Bénégui | |
| 1997 | Keo | | Olivier Van Hoofstadt | Short |
| 1997 | Parabellum | | Olivier Van Hoofstadt | Short |
| 1998 | Let There Be Light | The Journalist | Arthur Joffé | |
| 1998 | La mort du chinois | Michel Passepont | Jean-Louis Benoît | |
| 1998 | Mulan | Mushu | Barry Cook & Tony Bancroft | French Voice |
| 1999 | Whatever | Raphael Tisserand | Philippe Harel | |
| 1999 | Les grandes bouches | Félix | Bernie Bonvoisin | |
| 1999 | Cinq minutes de détente | Philippe Pabst | Tomas Roméro | |
| 1999 | Comme un poisson hors de l'eau | | Hervé Hadmar | |
| 2000 | Jet Set | Mellor da Silva | Fabien Onteniente | |
| 2000 | En face | Hugo | Mathias Ledoux | |
| 2000 | Les frères Soeur | Charlie Soeur | Frédéric Jardin | |
| 2000 | The Road to El Dorado | Tulio | Bibo Bergeron & Don Paul | French Voice |
| 2001 | Trouble Every Day | Choart | Claire Denis | |
| 2001 | Les morsures de l'aube | Caniveau | Antoine de Caunes | |
| 2001 | Le Vélo de Ghislain Lambert | Claude Lambert | Philippe Harel | |
| 2001 | La Vérité si je mens ! 2 | Serge Benamou | Thomas Gilou | |
| 2001 | Cats & Dogs | Diemitir Kennelkoff | Lawrence Guterman | Russian voice (Russian Blue breed of cat) |
| 2002 | Le Boulet | Mustapha Amel / The Turk | Alain Berbérian & Frédéric Forestier | |
| 2002 | Blanche | Louis XIV | Bernie Bonvoisin | |
| 2002 | Quelqu'un de bien | Paul | Patrick Timsit | |
| 2002 | L'ancien | Jesus | Nicky Naudé & Emmanuel Rodriguez | Short |
| 2003 | After You... | Louis | Pierre Salvadori | |
| 2003 | Rire et châtiment | Vincent Roméro | Isabelle Doval | |
| 2003 | Utopía | Comandante | Maria Ripoll | |
| 2004 | The 7th Day | José Jimenez | Carlos Saura | |
| 2004 | People | John John | Fabien Onteniente | |
| 2004 | Mulan II | Mushu | Darrell Rooney & Lynne Southerland | French Voice |
| 2005 | The Axe | Bruno Davert | Costa-Gavras | Nominated – César Award for Best Actor; Nominated – Globes de Cristal Award for Best Actor |
| 2005 | La Boîte noire | Arthur Seligman | Richard Berry | |
| 2005 | De qui me moque-je? | The peasant | Matthieu Maunier-Rossi | Short |
| 2005 | Madagascar | Alex | Eric Darnell & Tom McGrath | French Voice |
| 2006 | Four Stars | Stéphane | Christian Vincent | |
| 2006 | GAL | Manuel Mallo | Miguel Courtois | |
| 2006 | Arthur and the Invisibles | Ernest Davido | Luc Besson | French Voice |
| 2007 | His Majesty Minor | Minor | Jean-Jacques Annaud | |
| 2007 | Have Mercy on Us All | Jean-Baptiste Adamsberg | Régis Wargnier | |
| 2008 | Asterix at the Olympic Games | Couverdepus | Frédéric Forestier & Thomas Langmann | |
| 2008 | A Man and His Dog | Tramway's Man | Francis Huster | |
| 2008 | Madagascar: Escape 2 Africa | Alex | Eric Darnell & Tom McGrath | French Voice |
| 2010 | Le mac | Ace / Chapelle | Pascal Bourdiaux | Alpe d'Huez International Comedy Film Festival – Best Acting |
| 2011 | Chez Gino | Gino Roma | Samuel Benchetrit | |
| 2012 | Les seigneurs | Patrick Orbéra | Olivier Dahan | |
| 2012 | La vérité si je mens ! 3 | Serge Benamou | Thomas Gilou | |
| 2012 | Madagascar 3: Europe's Most Wanted | Alex | Eric Darnell, Tom McGrath & Conrad Vernon | French Voice |
| 2013 | Now You See Me | Étienne Forcier | Louis Leterrier | |
| 2013 | Vive la France | Muzafar | Michaël Youn | |
| 2013 | Fonzy | Diego | Isabelle Doval | |
| 2016 | Tout Schuss | Max Salinger | Stéphan Archinard & François Prévôt-Leygonie | |
| 2016 | Bastille Day | Victor Gamieux | James Watkins & Jill Gagé | |
| 2016 | À fond | Tom | Nicolas Benamou | |
| 2021 | Encanto | Bruno Madrigal | Jared Bush & Byron Howard | French voice |
| 2024 | IF | Blue | John Krasinski | French voice |
| 2024 | Speak Out (Le Panache) | M. Devarseau | Jennifer Devoldère | |
