= Testament (2004 film) =

- Arabic: تينجا,
- Directed by: Hassan Legzouli
- Written by: Hassan Legzouli, Emmanuelle Sardou
- Starring: Roschdy Zem, Aure Atika, Abdou El Mesnaoui
- Release date: 2004
- Country: Morocco
- Language: Arabic

Ten'ja (Arabic: تينجا, English title Testament) is a 2004 Arabic-language French-Moroccan film directed by Hassan Legzouli, written by the director and Emmanuelle Sardou. The film stars Roschdy Zem, Aure Atika, and Abdou El Mesnaoui.
