= A.K. Rudanovsky =

Arkadiy Konstantinovich Rudanovsky
- Born: 12 January 1873; Russian Empire
- Died: 1933; Nice, France
- Occupations: Art collector,patron
- Spouse: Varvara Feodorovna Rudanovsky (1886-1953)
- Children: Nicolas Rudanovsky, Olga Rudanovsky
- Parents: Konstantin Rudanovsky; Sofia Rudanovsky

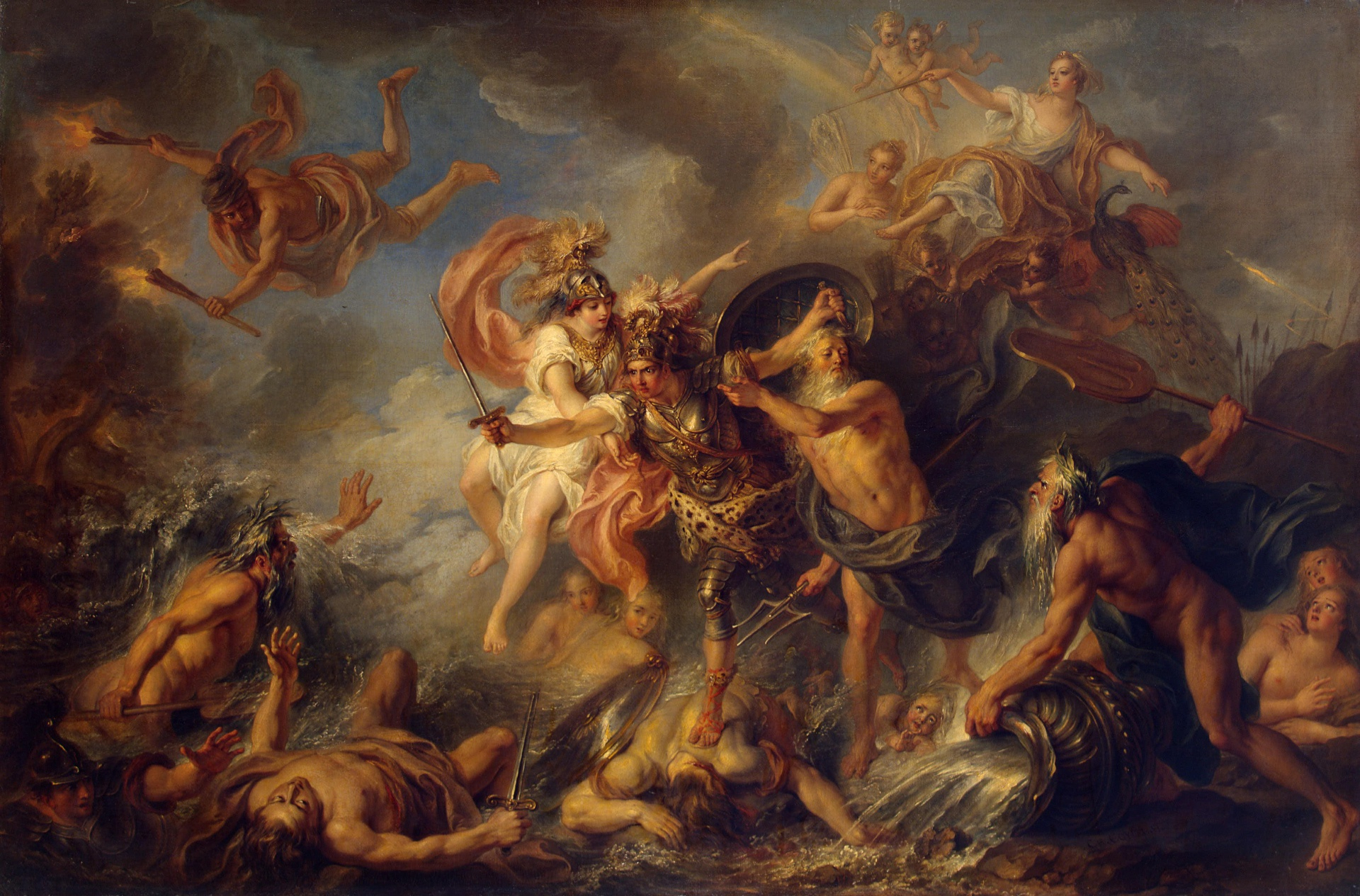
Coypel, Charles-Antoine - Fury of Achilles - 1737. Hermitage.

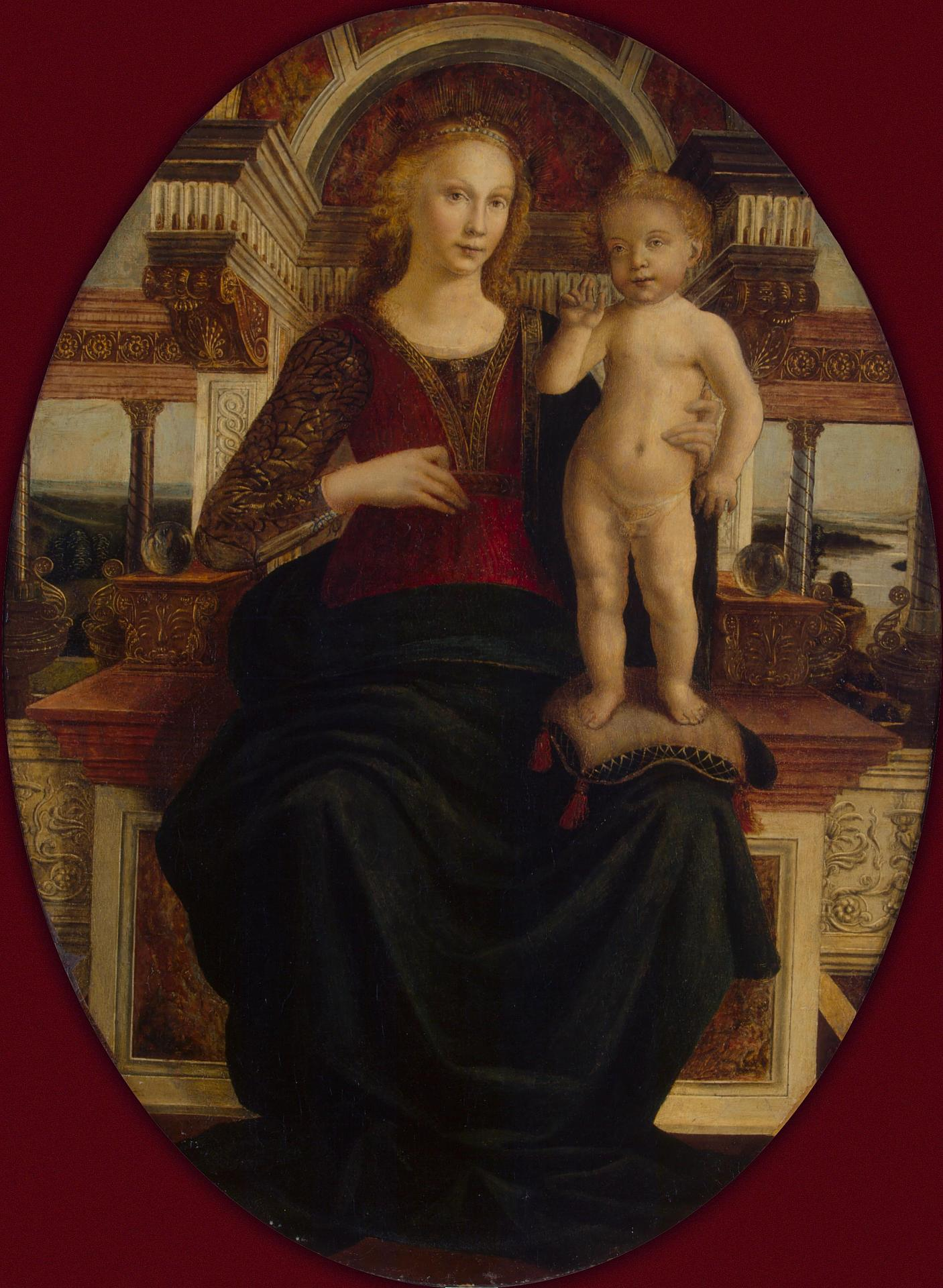
A.K. Rudanovsky collection

Arkadiy Konstantinovich Rudanovsky (23 January 1873 Saint Petersburg, Russian Empire - 9 November 1933 Nice, France. Russian Orthodox cemetery Caucade, burial number 245) was a Russian art collector, patron, and one of the largest private dealers of art, antiques, and jewellery in Russian Empire. Successful sale of his family treasure, the Sancy Diamond, to Lord Astor allowed him to open his first antique shop in 1906 at 62 Nevsky Avenue, central Petrograd (St. Petersburg). Rudanovsky became a close friend and partner of Agathon Fabergé, the son of the famous Imperial jeweler to the Russian Tsar Gustav Fabergé. In June 1918, with advice and financial support from A.K. Rudanovsky, Agathon also opened his antique boutique at 16 Morskaya street, Central Petrograd.

== Russian revolution 1917 ==
With the onset of the Communist Revolution in 1917, the Russian art and financial community went into panic, and aristocrats flocked to the partners of A.K. Rudanovsky and Fabergé to convert their art and antiques to cash. Rudanovsky and Fabergé rapidly accumulated valuable items to create one of the finest art and antique collections of Russia and Europe. After acquiring it, Rudanovsky donated large portions of this newly acquired art to museums (mainly the Hermitage, but some smaller collections can be found at the Louvre and at the Metropolitan Museum). The remainder was hidden with the aim of protecting it for future generations at Agathon's dacha. The dacha of Fabergé was commonly referred to as "The Small Hermitage."

== Rudanovsky family collection at Hermitage ==
1. Coypel, Charles-Antoine. Fury of Achilles 1737.
2. Vogel von Vogelstein, Carl Christian. Portrait of a Lady 1811.
3. Desiderio da Settignan. Madonna and Child, Second half of the 1450s.

== A.K. Rudanovsky Fabergé collection ==
Narcissus - Faberge St. Petersburg 1908. Cajolong, jade, diamonds, rhinestone, gold. The State Hermitage.

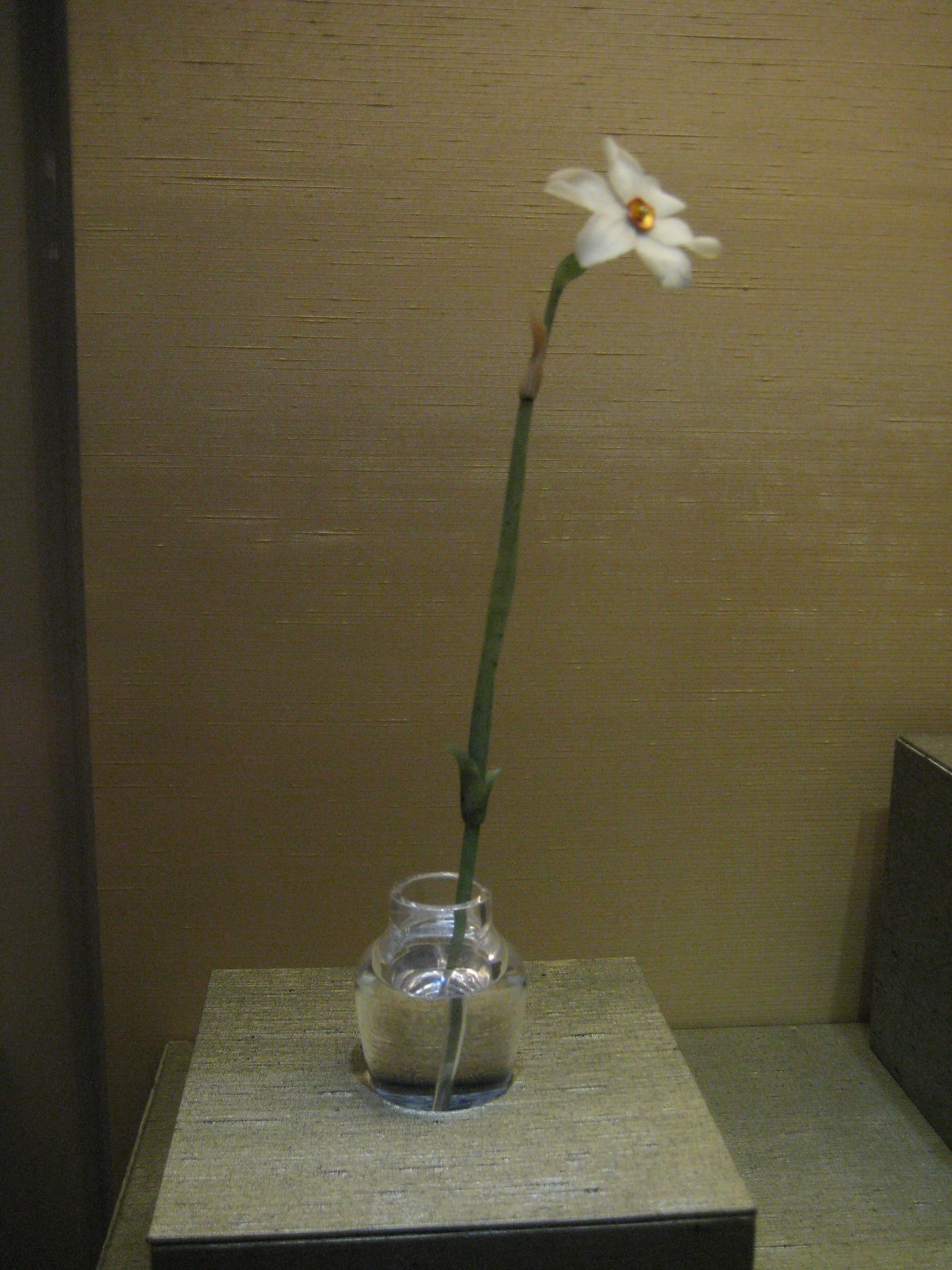
A.K. Rudanovsky Fabergé Flowers collection. Hermitage.
