= Villa Strassburger =

House in Deauville, Normandy, France.

- Villa Strassburger (French)
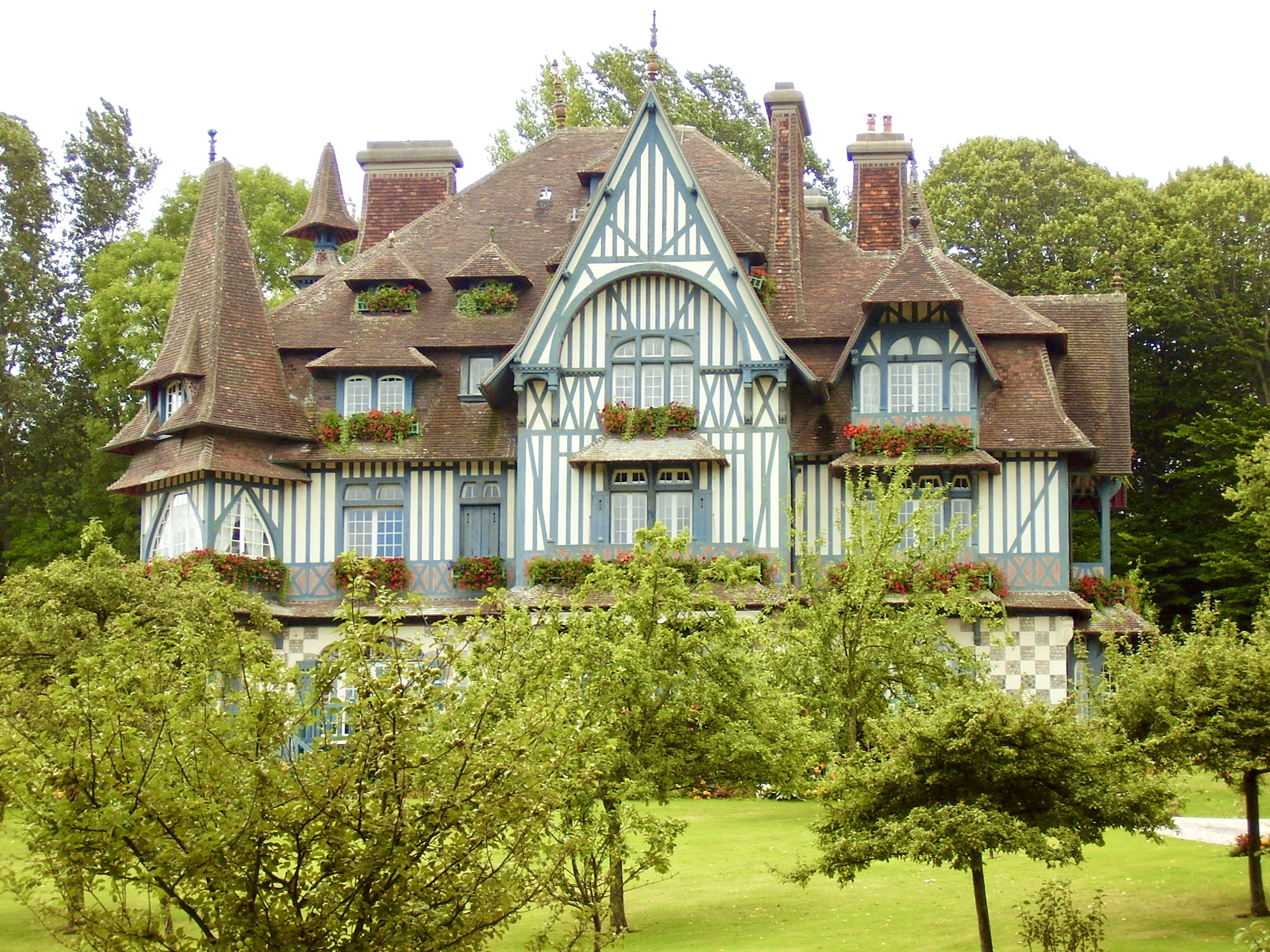
- Interactive map of Villa Strassburger
- 49.35102°N 0.07444°E
- Location: Deauville, Calvados, France

History
- Built: 1907-1912

Site notes
- Architectural style: Neo-Norman

Monument historique
- Type: Inscrit
- Designated: 29 October 1975

Villa Strassburger (formerly Villa Rothschild), is a villa in Deauville, Normandy, France.

== History ==
The villa was built between 1907 and 1912 according to the plans of the Caen architect Georges Pichereau for Henri de Rothschild, on the site of a farm he had bought in 1875 from Gustave Flaubert (the Coteau farm). It is in the neo-Norman style.

== Architecture ==
The façades and roof have been designated as a monument historique by decree of 29 October 1975.
