= Konstantin Rudanovsky =

Konstantin Vasilyevich Rudanovsky
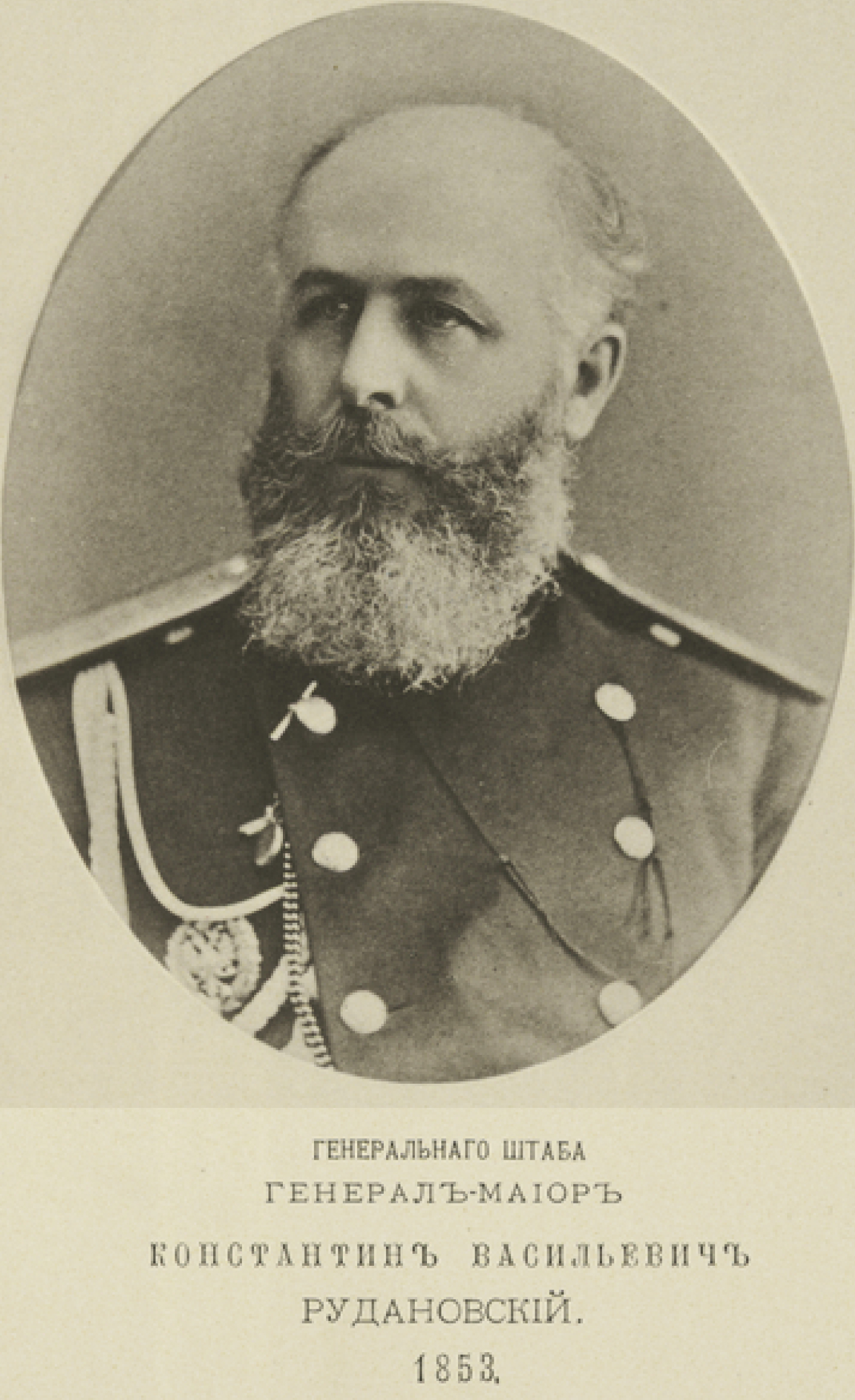
- Konstantin Vasilyevich Rudanovsky,1853
- Born: 12 May 1834; Russian Empire
- Died: 1899; Paris, France
- Occupations: General (Nicholas I of Russia), Art collector
- Known for: Rudanovsky dynasty, Russian culture in Deauville
- Children: A.K. Rudanovsky, Olga Rudanovsky
- Parent(s): Vasiliy Vasilievich Rudanovsky, Raisa Rudanovsky

Konstantin Vasilyevich Rudanovsky (May 12, 1834 - 1899) was a general who served Russian Emperor Nicholas I in Paris. He graduated first Cadet Corps and from The Nikolaev Academy of the General Staff in Saint Petersburg. Konstantin was a passionate collector and always hunted for masterpieces in France and Italy in order to re-sell it in Russia.

On one occasion he even sold a large portrait of Nicholas I to the tsar himself with the help of Charles de Morny, the ambassador of France to Russia. Morny was married to Sophia Trubetskaya (the illegitimate daughter of Tsar Nicholas I). The couple became friends with Konstantin and from time to time they bought works of art and jewelry from him.

Rudanovsky became well known among top art dealers in Paris and had a serious reputation after the sale of the Sancy Diamond.

He and Sofia Sergeyevna Trubetskaya often discussed the idea of creating a cultural centre, or a gallery where Konstantin would be able to exhibit his art collections. One day Sophia said: "I want to build an island of Russian culture in France". This idea was very important to Konstantin and he suggested Monry to make a magnificent gift to his wife Sophia for a birthday. Monry built the seaside town of Deauville to celebrate their love. Deauville in fact became for many years the epicenter for Russian culture in France. In 1912 Deauville witnessed the golden age of the Diaghilev Ballet Company.

Rudanovsky was the mentor of Grand Duke Konstantin Konstantinovich of Russia, who was grandson of Emperor Nicholas I of Russia and Grand Duke Peter Nikolaevich of Russia.

His son is the art collector Arkadiy Konstantinovich Rudanovsky.
