= Mumu (2010 film) =

- Directed by: Joël Séria
- Written by: Joël Séria
- Produced by: Jacques Driencourt
- Starring: Sylvie Testud; Balthazar Dejean de la Bâtie; Jean-François Balmer; Bruno Lochet; Dominique Pinon; Michel Galabru
- Cinematography: Pascal Gennesseaux
- Edited by: Svetlana Vaynblat
- Music by: Reinhardt Wagner
- Distributed by: Gébéka Films
- Release date: 6 June 2010 (France)
- Running time: 90 minutes
- Country: France
- Language: French
- Box office: $494.000

Mumu is a 2010 French film directed by Joël Séria.

The screenplay, of a largely autobiographical nature, was written by the director from 1993 - a long planned project for Séria who had not directed a full-length film since 1987.

== Plot ==
In 1947, Roger Lantier, 11 years old, is expelled, again, from his school - to the despair and anger of his father. He goes next to a new school where 'Mumu' holds sway, "the meanest teacher in the department". This meeting is one that will leave its mark on the young student forever.

== Cast ==
- Sylvie Testud as Mlle. Mulard ("Mumu"), teacher
- Balthazar Dejean de la Bâtie as Roger Lantier
- Jean-François Balmer as priest
- Bruno Lochet as 'Saucisse', the supervisor
- Dominique Pinon as father of Roger
- Prune Lichtle as mother of Roger
- Michel Galabru as Gâtineau, an old actor
- Valentin Ferey as Perchard, best friend of Roger
- Helena Noguerra as Madame Rotaillot
- Antoine de Caunes as the blind colonel

== Production ==
Filming took place in Aubigné (Deux-Sèvres).
