= What if Gargiulo Finds Out? =

- Directed by: Elvio Porta
- Written by: Elvio Porta
- Produced by: Gianni Minervini
- Starring: Giuliana De Sio; Richard Anconina
- Cinematography: Alfio Contini
- Edited by: Mario Morra
- Music by: Pino Daniele
- Release date: 1988
- Country: Italy
- Language: Italian

What if Gargiulo Finds Out? (Italian: Se lo scopre Gargiulo) is a 1988 Italian comedy film written and directed by Elvio Porta and starring Giuliana De Sio and Richard Anconina.

== Cast ==
- Giuliana De Sio as Teresa Capece
- Richard Anconina as Ferdinando
- Mario Scarpetta as Roberto
- Nicola Di Pinto as Friariello
- Gea Martire as Ernestina
- Giuseppe De Rosa as Auricchio
- Nunzia Fumo as Teresa's Mother-in-law
- Enzo Cannavale as Teresa's Father
- Pino Ammendola as Ferdinando's Friend
- Marzio Honorato as Organizer of the Riffa
- Franco Javarone as De Crescenzo
- Gianfranco Barra as Health Inspector
- Franco Pistoni as Scarrafone
- Mico Galdieri as Troncone
