= Elvio Porta =

Italian actor, film director, and screenwriter

Elvio Porta (22 May 1945 – 26 December 2016) was an Italian actor, film director, and screenwriter. He won three Silver Ribbons over the course of his career. In 1980, his Café Express won for Best Story. Four years later, Porta and Nanni Loy shared the Silver Ribbon for Best Screenplay for Where's Picone? In 1986, Porta was named the Best New Actor for his appearance in Camorra.

Porta died in 2016, aged 71.

== Selected filmography ==
- The Payoff (1978)
- Neapolitan Mystery (1979)
- Café Express (1980)
- Where's Picone? (1983)
- Camorra (1986; also appeared as actor)
- What if Gargiulo Finds Out? (1988; also directed)
- Street Kids (1989)
- Too Much Romance... It's Time for Stuffed Peppers (2004)
