= Would I Lie to You? 2 =

- Theatrical release poster
- Directed by: Thomas Gilou
- Written by: Gérard Bitton; Michel Munz
- Produced by: Aïssa Djabri; Farid Lahouassa; Manuel Munz
- Starring: Richard Anconina; José Garcia; Bruno Solo; Gad Elmaleh; Aure Atika; Gilbert Melki
- Cinematography: Robert Alazraki
- Edited by: Nicole Saunier
- Music by: DJ Abdel; Hervé Rakotofiringa
- Production companies: Vertigo Productions; TPS Cinéma; M6 Films; TF1 Films Production
- Distributed by: Warner Bros. Pictures
- Release date: 7 February 2001
- Running time: 105 minutes
- Country: France
- Language: French
- Box office: $42.7 million

Would I Lie to You? 2 (French: La Vérité si je mens 2 !) is a 2001 French comedy film directed by Thomas Gilou. It is a sequel to the 1997 film Would I Lie to You?.

The film was released in France on 7 February 2001 by Warner Bros. Pictures. It became the second highest-grossing film in France that year, only behind Amélie.

== Cast ==
- Richard Anconina as Édouard "Eddie" Vuibert
- José Garcia as Serge Benamou
- Bruno Solo as Yvan Touati
- Gad Elmaleh as Dov Mimran
- Aure Atika as Karine Benchetrit-Mimran
- Gilbert Melki as Patrick Abitbol
