= Would I Lie to You? (film) =

La Vérité si je mens !
- Directed by: Thomas Gilou
- Written by: Gérard Bitton; Michel Munz
- Produced by: Vertigo and Les Productions Jacques Roitfeld
- Starring: Bruno Solo; Richard Anconina; Vincent Elbaz; Aure Atika; Gilbert Melki; José Garcia; Amira Casar; Valérie Benguigui
- Music by: Gérard Presgurvic
- Production companies: Les Productions Jacques Roitfeld; Orly Films; Vertigo Productions; France 2 Cinéma; M6 Films; Canal+
- Distributed by: CFP Distribution
- Release date: 30 April 1997
- Running time: 100 minutes
- Country: France
- Language: French
- Budget: $4 million
- Box office: $66.4 million

La Vérité si je mens ! (French pronunciation: [la.ve.ʁi.te.siʒ.mɑ̃] ; English title: Would I Lie to You?) is a 1997 French film, directed by Thomas Gilou. It was followed by a sequel, La Vérité si je mens ! 2, in 2001, and a third movie La vérité si je mens ! 3, in 2012.

== Plot ==
In Paris, Eddie Vuibert (Richard Anconina) is an unemployed man in financial difficulty. A rich Jewish cloth manufacturer takes Eddie into his corporation out of pity because he mistakenly believes him to be Jewish as well. Eddie rapidly integrates in the Parisian Jewish textile community and rises as a sales manager. He continues his masquerade of pretending to be Ashkenazi Jew in order to woo his boss's daughter (played by Amira Casar).

== Reception ==
The film was the highest-grossing French film for the year. The film was nominated for two César Awards: Casar for Most Promising Actress, and José Garcia for Most Promising Actor for his portrayal of Serge Benamou.

== Sequels ==
A sequel, La Vérité si je mens ! 2, was released in 2001 and was even more popular in France with 7.8 million admissions, the second highest-grossing film for the year in France behind Amélie. A third film, La Vérité si je mens ! 3, followed in 2012.
