= Frédéric Forestier =

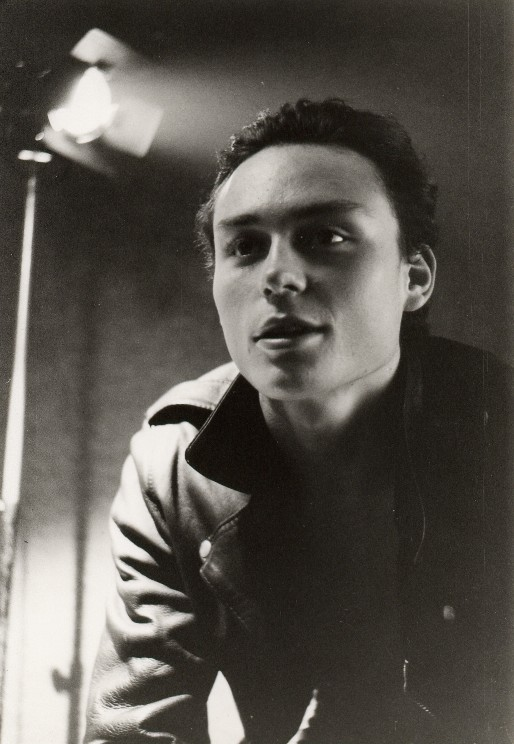
- Born: 1969 (age 56–57); Paris, France
- Occupations: Director, screenwriter, actor
- Known for: Astérix aux Jeux olympiques

Frédéric Forestier (born 1969) is a French director.

== Filmography ==
=== Director ===
- 1993 Paranoïa (short film)
- 1997 The Peacekeeper
- 2002 Le Boulet - More than 3 million ticket sales in France.
- 2005 Les Parrains - More than 600,000 ticket sales in France.
- 2008 Astérix aux Jeux Olympiques - More than 6 million ticket sales in France.
- 2012 Stars 80
- 2023 Chasse gardée
- 2024 Les infaillibles

=== Actor ===
- 2009 Kaamelott, Livre VI (Aulus Milonius Procyon)

== See also ==
- Frédéric Forestier at IMDb
- Frédéric Forestier at AlloCiné (in French)
