= Sturmtruppen: The Videogame =

1992 video game

- Developer: iDea
- Publisher: iDea
- Designers: Lodovico Benvenuto, Ivano Codina, Filippo Macchiettini
- Platform: Amiga
- Release: 1992
- Genres: Arcade platform, Run and gun
- Mode: Single player

Sturmtruppen: The Videogame is a video game for the Amiga computer platform, based on the Sturmtruppen comic books by Franco Bonvicini, published by the Italian software publisher iDea in 1992.

It is the only officially licensed videogame using Sturmtruppen's theme and characters.

The game wasn't very successful commercially, and received rather low scores by reviewers (44% by Amiga Joker, 3/5 stars from Amiga Power .

For the time (1992) and the platform of its release (Amiga), the graphics left most of the machine's potential underutilised, the sound effects were almost non-existent and the soundtrack consisted mostly of simple repetitive chip music.

Nevertheless, the gameplay was somewhat various, as the player controlled a German "Sturmtruppen" soldier who could use a variety of weapons, and also pick up some vehicles including motorcycles, airplanes and tanks, which turned the game into a variable run and gun event, almost like a precursor to the Metal Slug series.
