= The Adventures of Saturnin Farandoul =

Novel by Albert Robida

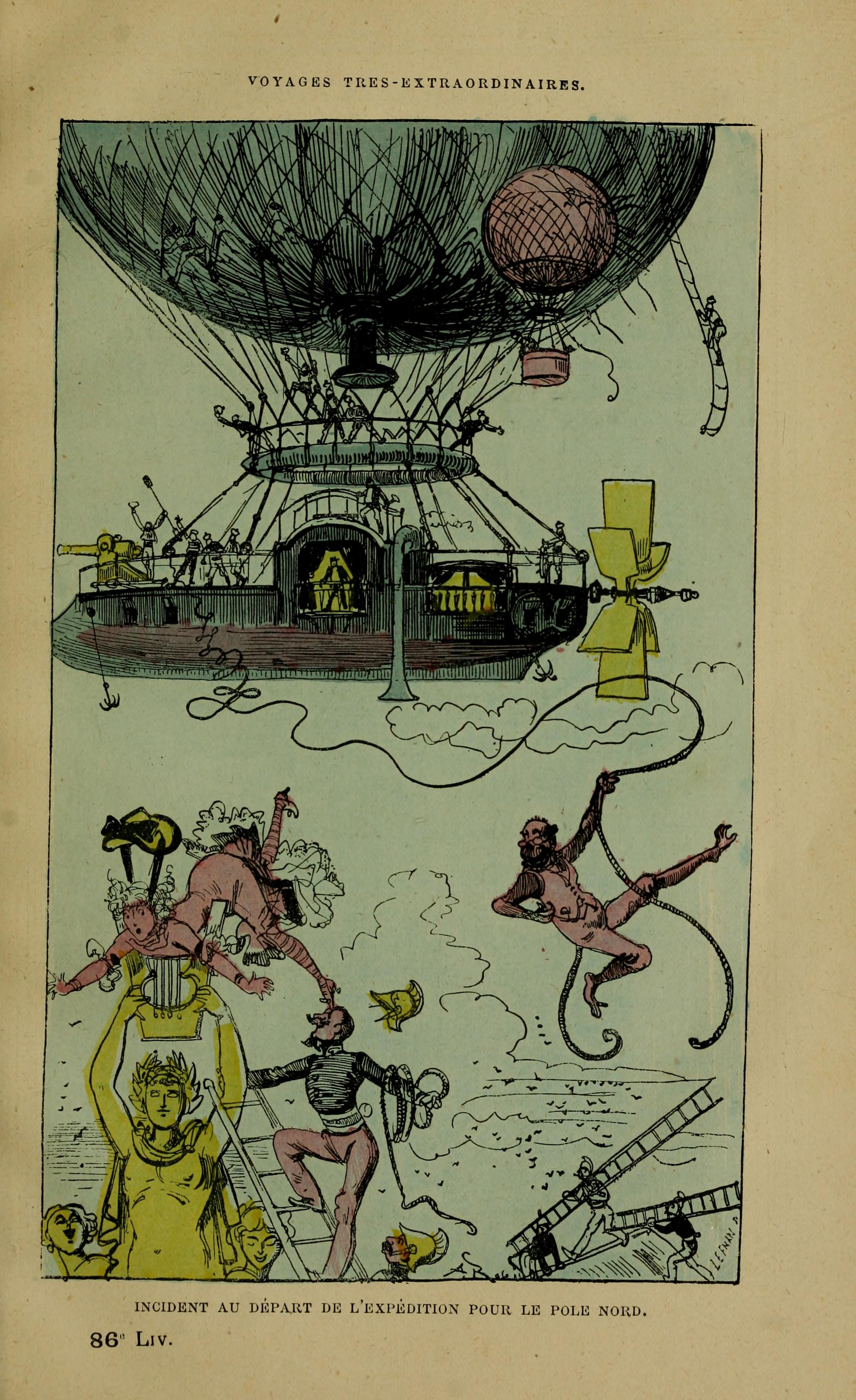
- Illustration of Robida from the installation Son excellence M. Le gouverneur du pôle Nord
- Author: Albert Robida
- Original title: Voyages très extraordinaires de Saturnin Farandoul
- Genre: Science fiction
- Publication date: 1879

Voyages très extraordinaires de Saturnin Farandoul ("The Very extraordinary journeys of Saturnin Farandoul") is a science-fiction novel by Albert Robida.

A parody of Jules Verne's Voyages extraordinaires, it was published in over one hundred installments between 1879 and 1880. It was first translated in English by Brian Stableford as The Adventures of Saturnin Farandoul. The novel proved to be very successful in Italy, where it was adapted into a 1913 Italian silent film, Le avventure straordinarissime di Saturnino Farandola, directed and interpreted by Marcel Fabre and into a RAI TV-series starring Mariano Rigillo and Daria Nicolodi in 1977.

A comic adaptation drawn by Pier Lorenzo De Vita was published on Topolino from 1938 to 1940, and a three-parts sequel starring Donald Duck in the title role, written by Guido Martina and still drawn by de Vita, was published in 1959. The novel also inspired the Bonvi's comic series Marzolino Tarantola.
