= Bob Peak =

American illustrator (1927–1992)

- Born: May 30, 1927; Denver, Colorado, United States
- Died: August 1, 1992 (aged 65); United States
- Education: Wichita State University
- Occupation: Illustrator
- Spouse: Lucille Peak

Robert M. Peak (May 30, 1927 – August 1, 1992) was an American commercial illustrator. He is best known for his developments in the design of the modern film poster.

His artwork has been on the cover of Time magazine, TV Guide, and Sports Illustrated. He also illustrated advertisements and U.S. postage stamps.

== Early life ==
Bob Peak was born in Denver, Colorado, and grew up in Wichita, Kansas. He knew from an early age that he wanted to be a commercial illustrator. He majored in geology at the University of Wichita (nka Wichita State University) and got a part-time job in the art department of McCormick-Armstrong. After serving in the military during the Korean War, Peak transferred to the Art Center College of Design in Los Angeles, California, graduating in 1951.

In 1953, Peak moved to New York City and landed an Old Hickory Whiskey advertising campaign. His work went on to appear in major advertising and national magazines.

He was the father of Matthew Peak, who is best known for illustrating posters for the Nightmare on Elm Street film series.

== Career ==
United Artists studio hired Peak in 1961 to design the poster images for the film West Side Story. The success of Peak's work on that film led to work on posters for designer Bill Gold, including the big-budget musicals My Fair Lady and Camelot. In the mid-1970s, Peak's style would become familiar to fans of science fiction films when he created the poster art for the futuristic film Rollerball (1975), which was followed by the first five Star Trek films, Superman (1978), Excalibur (1981), both Derek Flint films spy films (Our Man Flint in 1966, and In Like Flint in 1967), Apocalypse Now (1979), The Spy Who Loved Me and other James Bond concepts. By the 1980s, only the film poster artist Drew Struzan was in as much demand by film directors.

Peak received a commission from the U.S. Postal Service to design 30 stamps for the 1984 Summer Olympics in Los Angeles and the 1984 Winter Olympics in Sarajevo, Yugoslavia.

From January 20 through April 17, 2011, the Academy of Motion Picture Arts and Sciences presented the "Bob Peak: Creating the Modern Movie Poster" exhibit at its headquarters building in Beverly Hills.

Peak taught in his own college and later at Art Students League of New York, Pratt Institute and Famous Artists School.

== Illustrations ==
- Fate of a Man, movie poster illustration (U.S. release), 1959
- West Side Story, movie poster illustration, 1961
- The Leopard, movie poster illustration (U.S. release), 1963
- My Fair Lady, movie poster illustration, 1964
- The Cincinnati Kid, movie poster illustration, 1965
- The Liquidator, movie poster illustration, 1965
- Lord Jim, movie poster illustration, 1965
- Kaleidoscope, movie poster illustration, 1966
- Modesty Blaise, movie poster illustration, 1966
- Our Man Flint, movie poster illustration, 1966
- Camelot, movie poster illustration, 1967
- In Like Flint, movie poster illustration, 1967
- Thoroughly Modern Millie, movie poster illustration, 1967
- The Wanderer, movie poster illustration (U.S. release), 1967
- For Love of Ivy, movie poster illustration, 1968
- A Dream of Kings, movie poster illustration, 1969
- Funny Girl, movie poster illustration, 1969
- Lions Love (... and Lies), movie poster illustration (alternate poster), 1969
- The Secret of Santa Vittoria, movie poster illustration, 1969
- There Was a Crooked Man..., movie poster illustration, 1970
- Cesar & Rosalie, movie poster illustration (U.S. release), 1972
- The Great Waltz, movie poster illustration, 1972
- Mame, movie poster illustration, 1974
- The Voyage, movie poster illustration (U.S. release), 1974
- The Yakuza, movie poster illustration, 1974
- Rollerball, movie poster illustration, 1975
- That's Entertainment, Part II, movie poster illustration, 1975
- The Missouri Breaks, movie poster illustration, 1976
- Equus, movie poster illustration, 1977
- Islands in the Stream, movie poster illustration, 1977
- The Spy Who Loved Me, movie poster illustration, 1977
- Every Which Way But Loose, movie poster illustration, 1978
- Superman, movie poster illustration, 1978
- The Wiz, movie poster illustration (alternate poster), 1978
- Hair, movie poster illustration (alternate poster), 1979
- Apocalypse Now, movie poster illustration, 1979
- Star Trek: The Motion Picture, movie poster illustration, 1979
- Excalibur, movie poster illustration, 1981
- Star Trek II: The Wrath of Khan, movie poster illustration, 1982
- Star Trek III: The Search for Spock, movie poster illustration, 1984
- Star Trek IV: The Voyage Home, movie poster illustration, 1986
- Star Trek V: The Final Frontier, movie poster illustration, 1989

== Awards ==
In 1961, Peak was named Artist of the Year by the Graphic Artists Guild New York chapter. He won eight Awards of Excellence and four gold medals from Society of Illustrators. In 1977, the Society of Illustrators inducted him to its Hall of Fame. The Hollywood Reporter presented him the 1992 Key Art Award, now known as the Clio Entertainment Awards.

== See also ==
- Bill Sienkiewicz
- Drew Struzan
- Frank Frazetta
- Frank McCarthy
- Howard Terpning
- Jack Davis
- John Alvin
- Mitchell Hooks
- Richard Amsel
- Robert McGinnis
- Saul Bass
- Steven Chorney
- The Brothers Hildebrandt
- Tom Jung
