= In Like Flint =

1967 film by Gordon Douglas

- Theatrical release poster by Bob Peak
- Directed by: Gordon Douglas
- Written by: Hal Fimberg
- Produced by: Saul David
- Starring: James Coburn; Lee J. Cobb; Jean Hale; Andrew Duggan
- Cinematography: William H. Daniels
- Edited by: Hugh S. Fowler
- Music by: Jerry Goldsmith
- Color process: DeLuxe
- Production company: Saul David Productions
- Distributed by: 20th Century-Fox
- Release date: March 15, 1967
- Running time: 115 minutes
- Country: United States
- Language: English
- Budget: $3.7 million
- Box office: $11 million

In Like Flint is a 1967 American spy fi comedy film directed by Gordon Douglas, the sequel to the parody spy film Our Man Flint (1966). It posits an international feminist conspiracy to depose the ruling American patriarchy with a feminist matriarchy. To achieve and establish this plan, they kidnap and replace the U.S. president, discredit the head of the Z.O.W.I.E. intelligence agency, and commandeer a nuclear-armed space platform, all directed from Fabulous Face, a women's beauty farm in the Virgin Islands. Circumstances compel ex-secret agent Derek Flint to help his ex-boss, and so uncover the conspiracy.

James Coburn and Lee J. Cobb reprise their roles as Derek Flint and spy chief Lloyd C. Cramden, Flint's ex-boss, respectively. Jerry Goldsmith, who wrote the score for Our Man Flint, also returns. The ad campaign features poster artwork by Bob Peak. The title is a play on the phrase "in like Flynn."

This film and Caprice with Doris Day were the last films made in CinemaScope, with Fox and other studios moving to Panavision and other widescreen processes.

== Plot ==
After observing the launch of a new space platform, Z.O.W.I.E. Chief Lloyd C. Cramden joins President Trent for a game of golf. Their game is interrupted by the Fabulous Face organization. They succeed in knocking Cramden out, capturing the president and replacing him with an actor surgically altered to look like him. The Fabulous Face plans to control the world and run it entirely by a group of women. The first step in their plan is to gain control of a US space facility in the Virgin Islands. They establish a spa there as a cover. The women establish their headquarters near the rocket base and plant tape recorders in their hair dryers to brainwash their sisters.

Puzzled by an apparent three-minute time discrepancy—revealed by a perusal of a stopwatch that was active during the switch—Cramden visits the former agent Derek Flint's apartment in New York. He is greeted by three women who lead them to Flint. Cramden requests him to investigate the mystery. Meanwhile, Lisa Norton, a Fabulous Face agent, talks to the three women and tricks them into accepting a visit to the spa. Cramden later encounters Norton at an Italian restaurant. Disguised as a southern tourist, she drugs him with "euphoric acid" (a soporific substance) and stages a compromising scene with a prostitute at a hotel; the scene is then photographed and published under the auspices of General Carter, who is working with Fabulous Face. With Cramden framed as a libertine, the "imposter" President publicly suspends him from active duty.

Derek Flint eventually hypnotizes Cramden with his special watch and learns what really happened. Investigating further, Flint breaks into Z.O.W.I.E. headquarters and discovers the two astronauts on the recently launched space platform are actually Russian female cosmonauts. Flint is interrupted by General Carter and turncoat guards who, after a struggle, believe they have killed Flint when he apparently falls into a document incinerator.

Having actually escaped his demise, Flint travels to the Soviet Union to continue his investigation. Dancing in the Bolshoi ballet, he makes contact with ballerina Natasha. She actually is a Fabulous Face operative and attempts to drug him with euphoric acid. Flint foils Natasha's designs and tries to interrogate her but is interrupted by the KGB, who want to bring him to the Soviet Premier. Flint escapes their clutches. He next sneaks into the Kremlin and overhears the Premier bluffing the fake U.S. president; conversational clues point to the spa.

Cramden also travels to the spa to investigate further but is captured and imprisoned with the real President. Fabulous Face, in anticipation of Flint coming to the spa, have imprisoned his girl friends in cryogenic chambers. Flint boards a flight for Cuba disguised as a revolutionary. Distracting the other passengers, he ties up the pilots, parachutes out over the Virgin Islands, and swims to the Fabulous Face complex. There, he is intercepted by Norton, who brings him before the Fabulous Face leadership, a group of female business executives. Flint attempts to talk the women out of their plan but is interrupted by General Carter, who is dissatisfied with his subordinate role and plans to take power himself with the aid of the fake president. After a fight, Flint is captured by Carter's men and placed, along with Cramden, the captive President, and the Fabulous Face leadership, into cryogenic suspension. Flint escapes his chamber. He decides to join sides with the women in stopping Carter's plan to atomically arm the space station. Flint, Cramden, President Trent, and the women travel to the base where the launch is scheduled to take place. There, the women seduce and subdue the male guards. After they take over the control room, Carter (who is on board the rocket) threatens to activate his atomic warheads unless he is allowed to proceed with the launch. Flint boards the capsule before it takes off; once in orbit, he and Carter fight, causing the spacecraft to tumble. After overpowering Carter, Flint escapes the capsule, which is then destroyed with Carter trapped inside by a missile launched from the surface. Flint then manages to float to a nearby space platform, where he enjoys the hospitality of the resident female cosmonauts while awaiting return to Earth.

== Cast ==
- James Coburn as Derek Flint
- Lee J. Cobb as Cramden
- Jean Hale as Lisa
- Andrew Duggan as President Trent
- Anna Lee as Elisabeth
- Hanna Landy as Helena
- Totty Ames as Simone
- Steve Ihnat as Carter
- Thomas Hasson as Avery
- Mary Michael as Terry
- Diane Bond as Jan
- Jacki Ray as Denise
- Herb Edelman as Russian Premier
- Yvonne Craig as Natasha, the Ballerina

Bill Lear – credited as W. P. Lear Sr. – makes a cameo appearance as himself.

== Production ==
Coburn's fee for the film was $500,000 plus a percentage of the profits. Filming took place in September 1966 in Hollywood and on location in Jamaica.

Coburn later said Gordon Douglas "really didn't direct the film" saying Robert 'Buzz' Henry (Coburn's stunt double and a stunt arranger on the film), the director of photography (William H. Daniels) and myself were really responsible for the film. But that was the fun of it. Gordon Douglas was ill or had a heart problem or some damn thing. Anyway, he would come on the set and say what we were doing was wonderful and so on. Then he would often leave the set. Still it was fun. We had a great group of team players... the studio (Fox) really didn't support us with that concept. The script was also never finished. We actually started shooting without an ending to the film. The ending was tacked on the picture. Saul was working on a different ending, but the studio just wanted us to finish the film so they could release it. We had to shoot fast. We also had a pretty good budget. Most of the young women in the sequel were girlfriends of the execs working at the studio. It was playtime for those guys."

Our Man Flint co-screenwriter Ben Starr claimed he was asked to write the film but left after a dispute with Saul David over his salary.

Totty Ames, who played Simone, one of the female triumvirate, was the wife of producer Saul David.

=== Locations ===
Whereas in Our Man Flint Derek Flint lives in The San Remo in Manhattan, in In Like Flint he lives in the Wilshire Regent in Los Angeles. However, the skyline projected out the window is of Manhattan, with the DuMont Building visible in the background. The Fabulous Face spa in the Virgin Islands is represented by the Round Hill Hotel in Montego Bay, Jamaica. Interiors of the Z.O.W.I.E. facilities were filmed at the Hyperion sewage treatment plant.

== Deleted scenes ==
Some dialogue was removed after the previews that created a dispute between Saul David and 20th Century Fox.

When Flint debates the fallacy of the women's plans he states,

I'm sure all your facts are accurate but, like any other underdog in this world, you know more about the sickness than you do the cure. What you propose merely turns the coin over. It's the same old coin. If it's a slug on one side girls, it's a slug on the other. Now, forget it!

This was cut to just "Forget it"

The film's final line occurred when Flint romantically embraces the two female cosmonauts where he proclaims,

Men and women are not brothers!

== Soundtrack ==
Jerry Goldsmith returned to score the film, reusing his Our Man Flint theme. The song Your Zowie Face was composed by Goldsmith with lyrics by Leslie Bricusse.

Cover versions were performed by Nelson Riddle and Russell Malone.

== Reception ==
The film earned $5 million in rentals in North America in 1967. This meant it ranked in the top twenty films at the box office that year.

According to Fox records, the film needed to earn $6,975,000 in rentals to break even and made $9,125,000, meaning it made a profit.

== Critical reaction ==
In Like Flint received unfavorable reviews when released in 1967; a New York Times critic said: "Although the film crawls with dime-store beauties, there is a noticeable lack of sexiness in it. Women bent on being tyrants evidently haven't much time for anything else".

Roger Ebert had similar criticisms: "The sexiest thing in the new Derek Flint misadventure, In Like Flint, is Flint's cigarette lighter, which is supposed to know eighty-two tricks, but actually delivers only five, of which, one is the not extraordinary ability to clip Lee J. Cobb's moustache".

FilmInk argued "the film feels like it was made by men going through a divorce."

The most lauded element of the film was the score, once again composed by Jerry Goldsmith. As critic Daniel Schweiger wrote in 2014, "There’s hep, insane energy to spare in Goldsmith’s delightful grooves, ostinato excitement and confident strings, especially when he roughhouses Swan Lake-style with bongo prancing, horn-slurring Russian dance moves. And even given the score’s way-lighter tone, there are also some dynamite two-fisted brass moves that Bond would envy."

On Rotten Tomatoes, the film holds a rating of 68% from 19 reviews.

== Proposed Third Flint Film ==
Coburn later said, "The studio was very surprised by the success of the sequel. We said we might do more Flint films if the scripts were really good and if they hired top directors. Although Fox wanted us to do more Flint films, it just never worked out. They just didn't seem to care about quality anymore."

In 1972, Harlan Ellison wrote a script for a proposed third film called Flintlock, but it was never made.

In 1978 it was reported Coburn and Saul David were writing a script for another Flint movie. However, as was the case with previous attempts, efforts to make a third film were unsuccessful.

== In popular culture ==
In the movie Austin Powers: The Spy Who Shagged Me, the main character Austin Powers (while being on honeymoon with his new wife Vanessa Kensington) switches on the TV to a scene from In Like Flint. He mentions to Vanessa that it is his favorite movie. The phone in Austin's devices has the same ringtone (but altered) as the Z.O.W.I.E. telephone in the beginning of this film.

In the Movie Hudson Hawk, the main antagonist Darwin Mayflower, describing how to burgle their next target says "... and you're in like Flynt." Further, the electronic handcuffs he uses to subdue the titular protagonist has the same ringtone as the Z.O.W.I.E. telephone ring. The movie also stars James Coburn.

== See also ==
- List of American films of 1967
- Outline of James Bond
