= Wilshire Regent =

Residential building in Los Angeles, California

Coordinates: 34.064115°N 118.432811°W

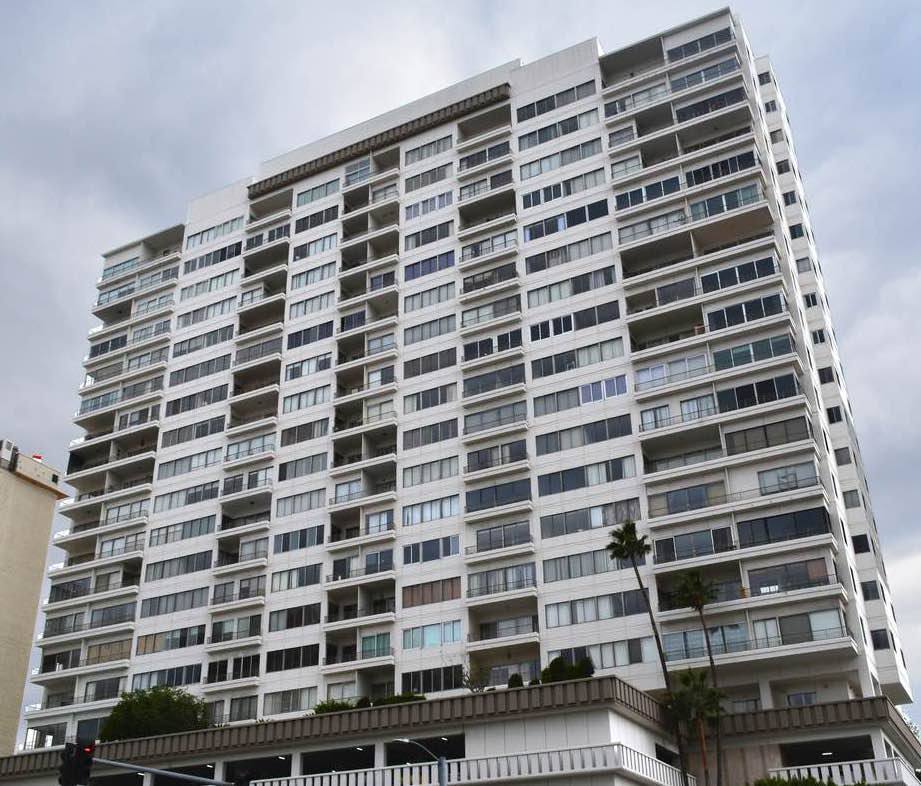

General information
- Type: Residential
- Location: 10501 Wilshire Blvd, Los Angeles, California
- Groundbreaking: September 8, 1962
- Opened: October 1, 1963

Height
- Roof: 92.47 m (303.4 ft)

Technical details
- Floor count: 23

Design and construction
- Architecture firm: Robert Charles Lesser & Associates; Leon Glucksman & Associates
- Structural engineer: Bernhard Cardan
- Main contractor: M. J. Brock & Sons, Inc.

Other information
- Number of units: 208

The Wilshire Regent is a 23-storey, 92.47 m (303.4 ft) full service condominium skyscraper in the Wilshire Corridor section of Westwood, Los Angeles, California and the 103rd tallest building in Los Angeles.

== History ==
The Wilshire Regent was originally constructed as a co-op in 1963, making it one of the first major buildings constructed on what would become the Wilshire Corridor. At the time, it was the tallest building in the area and the fifth tallest building in Los Angeles. The building offered expansive views of Los Angeles including the hills of Bel Air, the skylines of Century City, Beverly Hills, Downtown Los Angeles, and the campus of UCLA. Additionally, many units had views of the Pacific Ocean, though some of these views have since been blocked by newer construction. The building is located across the street from both Sephardic Temple Tifereth Israel and Westwood United Methodist Church. The building originally contained studio, one and two bedroom units, but many units have since been combined.

The building was originally constructed as an upmarket building, and as such includes several amenities. This includes a heated pool, spa, sun deck, doorman, concierge, fitness center, banquet halls, conference rooms, offices, hotel suites, and valet parking.

== Popular culture ==
The Wilshire Regent serves as the home of Joan Merrill in the novel Stranger at Home by George Sanders. In the film In Like Flint, Derek Flint's apartment is in the Regent.

== Notable residents ==
- Osa Massen

== See also ==
- Wilshire Boulevard
