= Come rubammo la bomba atomica =

1967 film directed by Lucio Fulci

- Directed by: Lucio Fulci
- Screenplay by: Gian Paolo Callegari; Sandro Continenza; Roberto Gianviti; Amedeo Sollazzo
- Story by: Gian Paolo Callegari; Sandro Continenza; Roberto Gianviti; Amedeo Sollazzo
- Starring: Franco Franchi; Ciccio Ingrassia
- Cinematography: Fausto Rossi
- Edited by: Nella Nannuzzi
- Music by: Lallo Gori
- Production companies: Five Film; Fono Roma; Coprofilm
- Distributed by: Euro International Films (Italy)
- Release date: February 9, 1967 (Turin)
- Running time: 98 minutes
- Countries: Italy; Egypt

Come rubammo la bomba atomica (lit. 'How We stole the Atomic Bomb') is a 1967 comedy film. Filmed in Italy and Egypt, it stars the Italian comic duo of Franco and Ciccio and was directed by Lucio Fulci.

The film features a teaming of parodies of famous film secret agents. James Bomb stands for James Bond, Derek Flit stands for Derek Flint, and Modesty Bluff stands for Modesty Blaise.

== Plot ==
While fishing off the coast of Egypt, Italian fisherman Franco and his father see an American Air Force bomber crash in the water carrying nuclear weapons. Franco's father and the rest of the crew flee in a lifeboat, stranding Franco in the boat off the coast, which beaches. When Franco swims ashore, Agent 87, a member of an international criminal organization called SPECTRALIS, kidnaps him to locate the nuclear weapon. A man named Pasqualino leads SPECTRALIS. Pasqualino sends an Egyptian scientist and SPECTRALIS employee Dr. Yes, who wishes to use the energy of the weapon to reanimate Egyptian mummies.

Ciccio cannot extract information from the fisherman for the bomb's location. His attempt to threaten Franco with torture on a mechanical butt-kicking device backfires when Ciccio lets himself demonstrate the necessary posture himself.

Franco escapes and arrives at a train station. Not understanding that he is in Egypt, he attempts to purchase a railway ticket to his home in Palermo, but cannot speak Arabic. A nearby Italian priest helps him by explaining where he is, and Franco treats the man to a cappuccino at the station bar. There, Franco's hollering voice attracts the attention of Cinzia, a woman who joins in on the conversation.

At the SPECTRALLIS base in Egypt, three spies named James Bomb, Modesty Bluff, and Derek Flit attack Ciccio. However, they are so fixated on depriving each other of the catch then let him escape unnoticed while they brawl it out.

Meanwhile, Cinzia lures Franco to her hotel room with the promise of sex. Unknown to Franco, she works for Dr. Yes. However, while she has her back turned, Bomb, Bluff, and Flit break into the room and attempt to abduct Franco, to no avail. Then Ciccio arrives, retrieves his prisoner, and spirits him away to the base. Ciccio later uses a lie detector to probe Franco's mind by asking him questions about the bomb. Seeing that Franco knows nothing, Ciccio confides in him that his superiors will have him killed for failure to find the bomb. Franco talks Ciccio into teaming up in hatching a plot to plant a fake bomb where it can be found.

Franco and Ciccio make contact with Cinzia, who believes their claims that they found the bomb. She tricks them into a meeting with Dr. Yes at his underground headquarters at a villa outside Cairo. Dr. Yes plans to revive an Egyptian mummy of Nabuco Sonor, the Queen of the Dead. He requires the bomb's radiation to do this. His experiment appears to be successful when he achieves a thumb twitch from a specimen. Franco and Ciccio deliver the fake bomb, only to be told they will be sacrificed to Nabuco Sonor on her revival. The duo laughs, knowing that the bomb is not real. The mummy then stands up and advances towards them. However, Dr. Yes's plans are thwarted when the "mummy" is revealed to be Derek Flit in disguise. Aided by Bomb and Bluff, Flit beats up all of Dr. Yes's men and abducts Franco and Ciccio.

Out in the desert, the three spies fall out again over who will get the credit for turning Franco and Ciccio over to their superiors. They stop fighting each other when a live report on the radio announces that the search has ended after the United States claimed that there was no nuclear bomb on board the crashed plane. Franco takes the disgraced Ciccio aboard his fishing boat, still beached on the shore, to sail back to Italy. When they pull up the fishing nets to cast off, they discover the actual bomb tangled in them.

Weeks later, Franco and Ciccio are aboard a yacht living in a life of luxury, with the bomb pointed across the sea as they are blackmailing world leaders for riches by telephone to avert nuclear destruction.

== Cast ==
- Franco Franchi as Franco
- Ciccio Ingrassia as Ciccio
- Julie Ménard as Cinzia
- Youssef Wahbi as Doctor Yes
- Eugenia Litrel as Modesty Bluff
- Franco Bonvicini as Derek Flit
- Adel Adham as James Bomb
- Gianfranco Morici as Dr. Yes's assistant
- Enzo Andronico as a Spectrales henchman

== Production ==
Come rubammo la bomba atomica was an international co-production between Italy and Egypt. It was made by two Rome based companies (Five Film and Fono Roma) and Coprofilm, a Cairo-based company. The film features parodies of various spy fiction characters of the period, such as James Bond with James Bomb, Modesty Blaise with Modesty Bluff and Derek Flit with Derek Flint.

The film was shot on location in Egypt with interiors shot at Incir-De Paolis Studios in Rome.

== Release ==
Come rubammo la bomba atomica was distributed in Italy by Euro International Films in 1967. It was released in Turin on February 9, 1967 followed by screenings in Rome on March 3 and Bari on March 11, 1967.
