= Ena Hartman =

American actress (1932–2025)

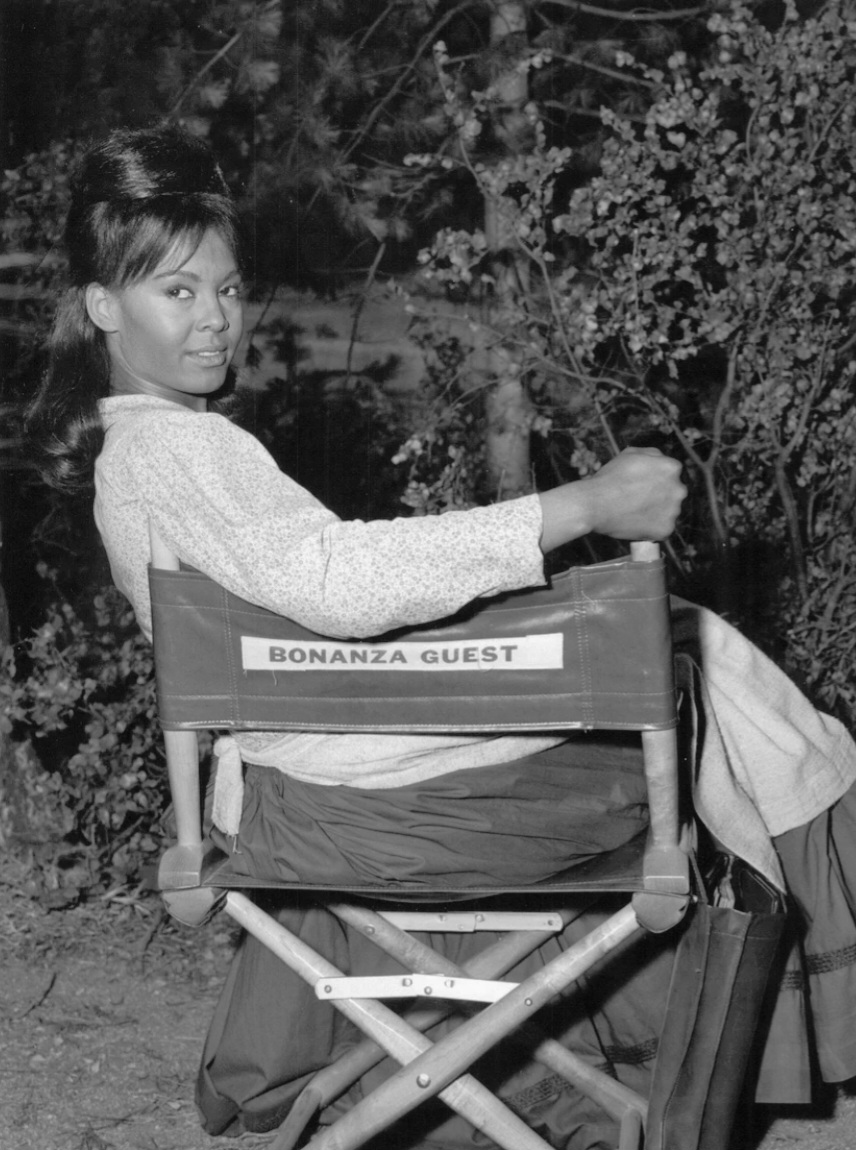
- Hartman in Bonanza, 1964
- Born: Gerthaline Henry; April 1, 1932; Moscow, Arkansas, U.S.
- Died: April 16, 2025 (aged 93); Los Angeles, California, U.S
- Occupation: Actress
- Years active: 1964–1975

Ena Hartman (April 1, 1932 – April 16, 2025) was an American actress who was a trailblazer in classic television history.

== Early life ==
Hartman was born on April 1, 1932, in Moscow, Arkansas, United States as Gerthaline Henry. Raised by her grandparents, she moved to Buffalo, New York at the age of thirteen to live with her mother. Due to financial constraints, Hartman left high school and opened a small restaurant, working as both cook and waitress, to save money for her aspiration of becoming a model. Her modeling career began after being discovered by a photographer in the lobby of a modeling agency that had just rejected her. She subsequently studied acting with Josh Shelley and Lloyd Richards.

== Career ==
In the early 1960s, Hartman participated in an NBC-sponsored talent competition, which led to her being offered a talent contract by the network. This made her the first African American to sign such a contract with a major television network. The contract included training and development for appearances in NBC programming.

Hartman's early roles included appearances in television series such as Bonanza (1964) and Profiles in Courage (1965). She also appeared in the spy spoof film Our Man Flint (1966). In 1966, she left NBC and took on roles in the television movie Fame Is the Name of the Game and an episode of Star Trek titled "The Corbomite Maneuver." Her other television appearances included Tarzan (1966), Ironside (1967–1969), Adam-12, and It Takes a Thief. In 1970, Hartman had a small role as a flight attendant in the film Airport. She then secured a regular role as police dispatcher Katy Grant in the television series Dan August (1970–1971), starring alongside Burt Reynolds. After the series ended, she played Carmen Simms in the film Terminal Island (1973). Hartman retired from acting in 1975.

Hartman was named Mayor of Universal City in 1968 when she was 33. She succeeded another Universal contract performer, Eileen Wesson. She was the first black woman to be so named.

== Personal life and death ==
Hartman was in a relationship with Swiss actor Maximilian Schell during the mid-1960s. She died on April 16, 2025, at the age of 93.

== Filmography ==
- Police Story (1975) - Margaret
- Knuckle-Men (1973) - Carmen Sims
- Dan August (1970–1971) - Katy Grant
- Airport (1970) - Ruth
- Ironside (1967–1969) - Janet Holmes
- The Outsider (1968) - Eleanor Springer
- It Takes a Thief (1968) - Jasmin
- The Name of the Game (1968) - Valerie
- Adam-12 (1968) - Mrs. Fred Warner
- Prescription: Murder (1968) - Nurse
- Dragnet 1967 (1967) - Ida Walters
- Games (1967)
- Fame Is the Name of the Game (1966) - Marcia Davenport
- Tarzan (1966) - Laneen
- The Jean Arthur Show (1966) - Edna
- Our Man Flint (1966) - WAC
- The Farmer's Daughter (1965) - Corrine
- Profiles in Courage (1965) - Ann Eliza Hammond
- The New Interns (1964)
- Bonanza (1964) - Caroline
