= Marzolino Tarantola =

Italian comic series created by Bonvi

- Genre: Humor/comedy

Creative team
- Created by: Bonvi

Marzolino Tarantola is the title character of an Italian comic series created by Bonvi.

The adventure was written in 1978 for the television programme Supergulp!.

The comics debuted in 1979, published in the magazines Il Corriere dei Piccoli and TV Sorrisi e Canzoni; at the same time a series of animation shorts was produced for the RAI TV-series Supergulp!. The stories were later collected in two books published by editor Rizzoli Junior. Mondadori Comics later reprinted the first adventure as Marzolino Tarantola - La grande corsa, volume 13 of its Superfumetti series.

The comic consists in a zany parody of Albert Robida's Saturnin Farandoul mixed with elements of the film The Great Race starring Jack Lemmon and Tony Curtis. It tells of Marzolino Tarantola, an adventurous, snob nobleman of British origins who takes part to the San Francisco-Paris car rally accompanied by the faithful butler Alfred and by Enrico l'Equipaggio (Henry the crew), a hulking speech-impaired man that solves any kind of problem.
