= Our Man Flint =

1966 film by Daniel Mann

- Theatrical release poster by Bob Peak
- Directed by: Daniel Mann
- Screenplay by: Hal Fimberg; Ben Starr
- Story by: Hal Fimberg
- Produced by: Saul David
- Starring: James Coburn; Lee J. Cobb; Gila Golan; Edward Mulhare
- Cinematography: Daniel L. Fapp
- Edited by: William Reynolds
- Music by: Jerry Goldsmith
- Color process: Color by Deluxe
- Production company: 20th Century Fox
- Distributed by: 20th Century Fox
- Release date: January 16, 1966
- Running time: 108 minutes
- Country: United States
- Language: English
- Budget: $3.525 million
- Box office: $12.95 million

Our Man Flint is a 1966 American spy-fi comedy film that parodies the James Bond film series. The film was directed by Daniel Mann, written by Hal Fimberg and Ben Starr (from a story by Hal Fimberg), and stars James Coburn as master spy Derek Flint. A sequel, In Like Flint, was released the following year, with Coburn reprising his role.

== Plot ==
Spy extraordinaire Derek Flint is an ex-agent of Z.O.W.I.E. (Zonal Organization World Intelligence Espionage) who is brought out of retirement to deal with the threat of Galaxy, a worldwide organization led by a trio of mad scientists: Doctor Krupov, Doctor Wu, and Doctor Schneider. Impatient that the world's governments will never improve, the scientists demand that all nations capitulate to Galaxy. To enforce their demands, they initiate earthquakes, volcanoes, storms, and other natural disasters with their climate-control apparatus to force countries to dissolve their armed forces and stop using nuclear power to generate electricity.

Initially reluctant, Flint decides to take them on after a preemptive assassination attempt by Galaxy's section head, Gila, who replaces a restaurant's harpist while Flint is dining with his four live-in "playmates" — Leslie, Anna, Gina, and Sakito. Gila uses a harp string as a bow to fire a poisoned dart, which misses Flint but hits his former boss, Cramden.

Flint squeezes the poison out of the wound, saving Cramden's life. A chemical trace on the dart directs Flint to Marseille for bouillabaisse. In one of Marseille's lowest clubs, he stages a brawl to gain information from "famous" Agent 0008, which leads him to a narcotics trade which is financing Galaxy.

Galaxy agent Hans Gruber is in the club enjoying his favorite soup while waiting to rendezvous with Gila. Instead, Gila sends Gruber to ambush Flint in the lavatory. Flint ends up killing Gruber in a toilet stall while Gila escapes, leaving behind a cold cream jar she has booby-trapped with explosives. Flint detects the trap and chases the bystanders from the club before detonating the bomb.

The remains in the jar lead Flint to Rome. After investigating several cosmetic companies, Flint arrives at Exotica, where he meets Gila for the first time. Gila lets him come to her apartment for an exchange of information, and then a seduction. Following their encounter, he steals the keys to Exotica and breaks into the company's safe, learning of Galaxy's location before being trapped by Gila's assistant, Malcolm Rodney. Malcolm and Gila assume that Flint will soon run out of air in the safe as they transport it to a waiting submarine. However, during the journey, Flint learns that his playmates have been kidnapped and taken to the headquarters on Galaxy Island in the Mediterranean Sea.

He then uses his power of self-induced suspended animation to fool his captors into thinking they have successfully killed him. Gila and Rodney take an evidence photograph of the "body", which they send to Cramden, then carry Flint back to headquarters on the submarine.

Flint revives and sneaks into the Galaxy complex, but his infiltration is thwarted, and he is taken before Galaxy's trio of leaders. Offered a chance to join their new order, he refuses and is sentenced to death by disintegration.

Gila's failure to eliminate Flint results in her being stripped of her leadership role and reassigned to become a Pleasure Unit – a fate that has already befallen Flint's playmates. She then changes sides, slipping Flint his gadget-filled cigarette lighter before she is hauled away. With the help of the lighter, Flint again escapes, sabotages the machinery, rescues his playmates and Gila, and departs the island as it disintegrates.

A waiting American warship picks up Flint and the women as they watch a volcano erupt on the island. Gila presumably joins the other four women living with Flint. (In the sequel, when Flint is again called out of retirement for a mission, he lives with three women, saying that "five was just too many.")

The last shot is of the "Anti-American Eagle" that attacked Flint at Rodney's behest earlier in the film flying over the smoking ruins of the island.

== Cast ==
- James Coburn as Derek Flint
- Lee J. Cobb as Cramden
- Gila Golan as Gila
- Edward Mulhare as Malcolm Rodney
- Benson Fong as Dr. Schneider
- Shelby Grant as Leslie
- Sigrid Valdis as Anna
- Gianna Serra as Gina
- Helen Funai as Sakito
- Michael St. Clair as Hans Gruber
- Rhys Williams as Dr. Krupov
- Russ Conway as American General
- Ena Hartman as WAC
- William Walker as American Diplomat
- Peter Brocco as Dr. Wu
- Robert Gunner as Agent 0008

The uncredited actor playing the overseer of the Pleasure Unit process is Dick Wilson, who later gained fame as "Mr. Whipple" in a long string of commercials for Charmin toilet paper. The voice of then-President Lyndon B. Johnson was provided by Van Williams, who provided the same voice-over effect later that year, in the film Batman: The Movie.

== Production ==
Producer Saul David had just made Von Ryan's Express for Fox and Our Man Flint would be his second film for the studio. David told the press that Flint would be "an entirely different cup of tea" to James Bond, "a sensitive and sensible individual, loyal to his own code instead of to an arbitrary entity which we might call 'our side'. His pleasures will be taken with verve and gusto a la Tom Jones and his heroics will be treated with wit and vitality, a la Douglas Fairbanks."

Coburn had appeared in a number of key supporting roles, particularly The Americanization of Emily (1964) and A High Wind in Jamaica (1965) but Our Man Flint was his first lead in a feature. His casting was announced in December 1964 and filming began in February 1965.

David said Coburn "is undoubtedly one of the most interesting looking actors in the business today. I would describe him as a cross between Humphrey Bogart and Jean Paul Belmondo - a true descendant of that bygone generation of character actors who became leading men by accident... Coburn has a fantastic effect on women filmgoers and I think it's because ladies go more for masculinity and charm than prettiness in a male star."

Coburn later said, "I credit the producer, Saul David, for the Flint films. He was responsible for the whole thing. He also cast me in the role. Of course, it was a spoof of the Bond and all the other spy films released at the time. What I liked about Flint was that he was his own man. He trained himself. We tried to work from that theme. It must have worked... after all, the film was a big hit."

Fox were so happy with the film that head of production Richard Zanuck announced preparations for a sequel, F as in Flint, in November 1965, before the movie was even released. It was then retitled In Like Flint.

=== Locations ===
Flint's apartment is located in The San Remo in New York City. The skyline projected out the window of the apartment is of Central Park South on 59th Street. The interiors of Galaxy Island were filmed at the Scattergood Generating Station.

== Influences ==
The film's direct nods to James Bond are in a comedic and outlandish style. Flint is initially offered a Walther PPK and an attache case with a concealed throwing knife, with Flint dismissing both as "crude". During the French strip club sequence, Flint stages a mock brawl with a patron identified as Agent 0008, a British secret agent. Flint asks if SPECTRE (the criminal organization in the early Bond movies) is involved, to which Agent 0008 replies, "It's bigger than SPECTRE!" The actor playing the role is similar in appearance to Sean Connery. Later in the film, Gila is shown reading a 0008 novel, referencing the James Bond novels.

== Soundtrack ==
20th Century Fox's house composer Jerry Goldsmith composed the film's score. The film's original soundtrack LP was rerecorded slower arrangements of the score, and a DVD of the surviving elements of the two Flint films was later released.

Herbie Mann covered the title theme, "Our Man Flint", on his 1966 album, Our Mann Flute. Many other cover versions of the theme music were recorded during the mid-1960s, including Roland Shaw, Billy Strange and The Challengers with Hugo Montenegro's version including the Presidential telephone's ringtone. Wall of Voodoo used the theme tune in the 2nd half of their version of "Ring of Fire".

== Cultural legacy ==
The distinctive ringtone of Cramden's "presidential hotline" telephone, created by the composer of the film's soundtrack Jerry Goldsmith, was re-used in the films Hudson Hawk and in the Seattle children's television program The J.P. Patches Show. Los Angeles KIIS-FM disc jockey Rick Dees used the sound effect as the "hotline" phone sound whenever the station manager would call and yell at him during his 1980s and 1990s shows. A similar ringtone was used in Austin Powers: International Man of Mystery, clearly as a sly reference to the Flint films.

Hanna-Barbara's 1966 animated film The Man Called Flintstone includes nods to the Our Man Flint, especially on the theatrical poster.

A 1965 novelization of the film by Jack Pearl includes much material not seen on the screen that may have been taken from an earlier screenplay draft.

The name Hans Gruber was later reused in two unrelated films, Re-Animator (1985) and Die Hard (1988).

Clips of audio from the film are sampled in The Desert Sessions song "Sugar Rush" on the album Volumes 3 & 4.

== Release ==
The film was premiered in St Ann's Bay in Jamaica in December 1965 but not officially released in the US until January 1966. Coburn and Mann did not attend the premiere but Cobb and David did.

=== Critical reception ===
Our Man Flint generally received positive reviews, having a "Fresh" score of 76% on Rotten Tomatoes from 33 critics.

Variety called it "a dazzling, action-jammed swashbuckling spoof of Ian Fleming’s valiant counterspy" where "in a cycle which sees virtually every studio clambering aboard the espionage bandwagon, indications point to blockbusting biz if film is properly exploited."

Filmink argued "a great deal of" the success of the film "(correctly) was attributed to Coburn. What other actor could have pulled it off? He had a laconic, suave, rugged look, not too pretty, a nice sense of humour. It helped that in real life Coburn was a pot smoker who’d served in the military but went his own way in life, a genuine counterculture figure who was into cars, karate, and poetry – all came through for Derek Flint."

=== Box office ===
It was the ninth highest-grossing film in 1966 based on North American theater rentals of $6,500,000.

According to Fox records, the film needed to earn $7,700,000 to break even (after distribution and overhead costs were added) and made $12,950,000 at the box office.

== Sequels ==
In Like Flint (1967) was directed by Gordon Douglas and again starred James Coburn, with Cobb also reprising his role as Lloyd C. Cramden.

In 1972, Harlan Ellison wrote a teleplay entitled Flintlock as a continuation of the films with Coburn intended to reprise his role. Still, studios have passed on what would have been a pilot for a proposed television series, and it went unproduced. A later attempt on the same format resulted in Dead on Target (1976), a Canadian-filmed television pilot directed by Joseph L. Scanlan, starring Ray Danton as Flint, here depicted as a private investigator. This originally aired on ABC-TV on March 17, 1976.

An Italian parody, Il vostro super agente Flit, was released in 1966.

== See also ==
- Dead on Target
- List of American films of 1966
- Outline of James Bond
