= Nick Carter (comic strip) =

Italian comic strip

Nick Carter is an Italian comic character created by Bonvi and Guido De Maria in the winter of 1969 - 1970 for the television programme, for Gulp!, one of the most popular Italian TV shows of that decade. It made his television debut on 14 September 1972. The creators were Guido De Maria, as director and writer, and Franco Bonvicini ("Bonvi"), as co-writer and artist. The first run comprised 11 stories, later reissued, as print comic strips for Il Corriere dei Ragazzi, and then in numerous other magazines and books.

In 1977, the character was revamped for the follow-on TV series SuperGulp!, with 17 further episodes. In Supergulp!, Nick Carter, Patsy and Ten also served as the programme's presenters. The Nick Carter episodes number some 80, including those created for TV and later adapted for comic-strip magazines. Several stories were drawn by Silver (Guido Silvestri) and Clod (Claudio Onesti).

== Characters ==
- Nick Carter, whose name is inspired to that of the homonymous pulp-novel detective, is a short, old-fashioned detective, usually called by other authorities or by private parties, to solve intricate cases. These are normally occasions to satirize famous movies, comics characters or real-world celebrities. Parodies of horror and science fiction themes sometimes appear. The stories are generally set in the United States of the 1910s and '20s, since Carter and his colleagues take part in occasional missions in World War I's front lines or the Russian Revolution.
- Patsy is Carter's tall, sturdy, and clumsy assistant, whose main abilities involve fists and weapons. Each stories usually ends with Patsy commenting: "And the last one repairs the damage" or "The last one closes."
- Ten is a Japanese detective who expresses himself only in rhyme, citing ironic versions of Japanese philosophy.
- O'Callaghan is a N.Y. City police official whose inability to solve a challenging case usually requires consulting Carter.
- Stanislao Moulinsky is a recurring villain Moulinsky is an alleged "master criminal" using astute disguises: the most incredible ones includes impersonating three people at once, a television, an airship and a fog. He is, however, invariably unmasked by Carter in the last panel of each story, with the signature exchange: (Nick Carter:) "No! This is not ___, but Stanislao Moulinsky in one of his best disguises!" (Stanislao Moulinsky, taking off his mask and with a strong Russian accent:) "Well yes, damned Carter, you have won again!"

== Parodies ==
Nick Carter stories feature a great number of parodies of famous themes and characters of literature, film, TV and history. An incomplete list includes:

- Marlon Brando, satirized two times: as the mafioso Babbino ("Little Daddy"), after the main character of The Godfather film; and as Merlon, a trade union leader in a story inspired to the film On the Waterfront. Note that in Italian "Merlone" is the augmentative form of "merlo" ("blackbird"), which also is a colloquial term for a fool.
- Mandrake the Magician, featured as the Great Mephisto, a criminal hypnotizer.
- Corto Maltese, as himself. He maintains, in pure Hugo Pratt's style: "I don't live for vile money. I live for adventure."
- Al Capone, as crime boss "Al Testone", whom Carter has similarly charged with a lesser offence (in this case a traffic violation).
- King Kong, as a giant gorilla of the "Barzum Circus", who falls in love with Patsy.
- Lenin, as himself, in the prison wagon carrying him back to Russia.
- Adolf Hitler, whose face is that of an unnamed, fanatic character attempting to bring panic in New York City with a series of terroristic acts.
- Jack London, portrayed with Bonvi's likeness.
- Orson Welles, as "Borson Willis", facing a false invasion from Mars.
- Italian politician Giulio Andreotti, as the "prime minister", in a late story of 1993.

== Controversies ==
Nick Carter was infamously involved in a pen-bomb attack, indirectly. He had approved the invasion of Serbia.
