= Sturmtruppen =

Italian comic series

Sturmtruppen is a successful Italian series of anti-war comic books written and drawn by Bonvi, the artistic pseudonym of Franco Bonvicini. It started as four-frame comic strips back in on 23 November 1968, published in the Italian newspaper Paese Sera, following Bonvi's success in the newspaper's comics competition., and evolved into fully sized collector books by the 1990s. The series ended with Bonvi's death in 1995.

== Subject ==
Sturmtruppen concerns the misadventures of an anonymous German army unit (which is implied to be a battalion) in various war theatres of World War II, by portraying the daily life, sufferings, problems and joys of the average, anonymous soldier. The Sturmtruppen never see a single enemy soldier in the course of decades of comic strips, though the enemy's presence is felt through sniper- tank- and artillery fire, whose lethal effects rake all too often through the ranks of the Sturmtruppen's forgotten soldiers.

The series never explicitly mentioned that the war being fought is actually World War II, since no specific date is ever mentioned. There are, however, occasional references to specific battle theaters, place names as well as the mostly accurate portrayal of vehicles, weapons and uniforms of the period. Several deliberate anachronisms such as mentions of the Kaiser appear throughout the series, giving the impression that the war in question wages on endlessly, and that the stories told could be, in fact, referring to any war.

=== Language ===
A trademark of the comic is the use of an improper, German-mocking Italian, usually achieved by adding a final "-en" to most Italian words, or by exchanging "q"s with "k"s, and "v"s with "f"s to achieve a "German-sounding" Italian.

=== Themes ===
The stories and characters themselves are based partly on the military experience of the author himself, and partly on military literature (Remarque's All Quiet on the Western Front, Guy Sajer's The Forgotten Soldier, Sven Hassel's books, etc...), folklore and of course stereotypes. Bonvi was also an expert in World War II German uniforms and equipment and, despite some cartoonish deformations, all of the Sturmtruppen hardware is historically faithful: from iconic objects and vehicles (MP40, Stielhandgranaten, personal harnesses, kubelwagens, stukas), to more obscure and esoteric weapons (like Brummbar assault guns).

The subject of the stories themselves carry a lot of criticism against war and the absurdity of military bureaucracy and mentality and (also by references to Joseph Heller's Catch-22 and to Robert Altman's M*A*S*H) also the message that "civilian" life isn't much different from military life, disguised. But criticism can subtly extend to today life's aspects, including TV predominance, class divisions and Roman Church's dogma.

The monologue of an anonymous soldier muttering to himself:

"Kuesta maledetta najen dovrà pur finiren. Ne ho piene le tasken di dofer dire 'Signorsì' a un kvalsiasi graduaten. Non fedo l'oren di ridifentaren un cifilen kvalsiasi e poter diren 'Sissignore' a un kvalsiasi superioren",

which can be translated (preserving the Pseudo-Germanisms) more or less as:

"Zis damned military service vill haff to end sometime. I've grown tired of hafing to say 'sir yes' to anyone with a higher ranken. I kan barely vait to return to being an anonymous civilian and being able to zay 'Yes, sir' to any of my superiors..."

This gives a clear idea of the black humour and Kafkaesque atmosphere of this comic book.

== Characters ==
Most characters don't have proper names but, rather, are called by their military rank or position. Most simple soldiers are given generic "German" names such as Otto, Franz, Fritz, etc. Recurring characters include:

- The "Sergenten" (Sergeant), a cruel veteran completely absorbed into the system and obsessed with "duty" and "discipline". He frequently abuses his position by beating up soldiers for no reason and using them as living barbed wire poles and barricades, ordering them to run into a minefield or to remove their gas masks in the middle of a gas attack to "check out if it's safe", etc. Although he is referred to as a Sergeant, his arm rank chevrons are those of a Wehrmacht obergefreiter, which would be equivalent to a conscript corporal and not a feldwebel.
- The "Kapitanen" (Captain) is sometimes one of the few characters representing sanity in an otherwise completely insane environment. He usually stays calm and rational even when dealing with the most bizarre and peculiar (or hilarious) situations. However, he is also hopelessly tied to the system and unable to think outside it. He is also easily drawn to dangerous tasks in order to advance his rank (the dangers are of course for the soldiers only). Even if he is just a Captain, he is often mentioned as commanding a battalion. Rarely, throughout the series his commanded unit is mentioned as being the "3rd Battalion". His character is also one of the most variable throughout the series, to adapt to new situations. Most of the time he is portrayed as no-nonsense, grumpy and distanced from his subordinates, while at the other extreme he has been portrayed as a chronic alcoholic with disregard even for personal danger, caring for his soldiers even after his death. When more than one higher officer were present in the same strip they ALL shared the same features (hawkish nose, taller stature, eyes obscured by the cap's visor) as if to reinforce Bonvi's 'class warfare' statement that 'superiors' are a kind of 'separate race' from 'common people'.
- The "Mediken Militaren" (Military Medic), a Major of the medical corps who had actually studied as a veterinarian, but because "...animals refused to be treated by him, he was assigned to the closest human category: the soldiers." From time to time the doctor becomes obsessed with things such as vampires, researching the elixir of invisibility or some "revolutionary" battlefield medicine procedure, usually at the expense of the poor soldiers and his fellow officers. His rank of Major is rarely ever mentioned in the series, with the most famous case being the episode with Captain asking for the doctor's urgent recovery in a psychiatric clinic due to his obsession with invisibility, only to be reminded by the higher command that "Since the doctor has a higher rank than him, he has the right to consider himself invisible as he wishes".
- The "Sottotenenten di Komplementen" (Complement Second Lieutenant), an incompetent young officer who has obtained his rank through nepotism and bureaucracy inside the army itself. While he willingly offers to carry out the most dangerous and responsible tasks to prove himself, he usually ends up failing miserably.
- The so-called Italian ally, "Il Fiero Alleaten Galeazzo Musolesi" (The Fierce Ally Galeazzo Musolesi), with a name clearly mocking both Benito Mussolini and Galeazzo Ciano. The character is a dishonest and cowardly man always trying to steal from and take advantage of his "allies", willing to perform any task as long as it's not too hard and he can somehow cheat on it. He also has strange fixations like posing in front of the enemy in order to "demoralize them" (but only when the enemy lines are to his back) or cultivating small "war gardens" with vegetables. His name derives from a prank Bonvi played in high school when he wrote a letter to a local paper pretending to be a World War I veteran and signing it "Galeazzo Musolesi".
- The prostitute (oft referred as "Lili Marlenen" in a nod to the famous Lili Marleen) is a leggy beauty (very 70-ish in appearance) clad in a trenchcoat and leaning to a bomb-distorted lamp-post. She's naturally ready to sell out her services to anyone but also has a naive and good-natured "admirer" who constantly brings her flowers and chocolates instead of the money she demands.
- The "Kuoken Militaren" (Military Cook) is the battalion's cook, always being criticized for the quality of his food and usually having to deal with an eternal lack of food and supplies or administration problems. These problems usually result in him serving horrible food such as dried peas instead of pea soup "because there's no water", frozen soup, soup made of motor oil and boiled tires, or even from dirty laundry water. At one point there is a meat shortage, but the shortage is resolved after the mysterious disappearance of several young soldiers... The cook is also in constant battle with the "Sergenten" and the "Proud Ally" who always try to either sabotage his kitchen or steal his food. Common running jokes in the series involve the cook's experiments with "foods" such as pieces of cadavers or even Frankenstein-like ingredients that actually become alive and attack the soldiers.
- The "Alleaten del Sol Levante" (The Ally from the Rising Sun) is a clear satire of the Japanese soldier, partly based on stereotypes such as a self-sacrificing attitude, sense of honor, etcetera. He is also portrayed as a sex maniac and exchanges racist taunts with Musolesi, whom he despises. Because of his short stature, for a long time he is believed to be the son of a gay couple of German soldiers.
- The 27th Armoured Battalion (of Discipline) is a duo of hardened veterans who embody Bonvi's homage to Sven Hassel picturesque war novels. The unkempt, tough-as-nails grognards are the only soldiers not to be intimidated by the cruel sergeant and often manage to scare him away. They spend time defusing aircraft bombs with impromptu equipment (such as bottle-openers) and telling colorful anecdotes of their previous experiences in penal units and military jails (often lifted 'as-is' from Hassel's novels).
- The Uffizialen Superioren (Superior Officers) represent the remote source of supreme authority, which occasionally materializes as colonels, generals or other inspecting officers. In one series, an aging general finds himself stripped off his uniform and, by extension, of all his authority and might. He is rudely treated as a senile old man, until he manages to get his uniform back, along with all his respect and authority.
- The SS execution squad and the Jew are one of the many examples of dark humour in Sturmtruppen: the SS must "exterminate" the Jew, but they are so bad at shooting that they always miss; the SS commander blames the Jew for moving. On his side, the Jew is very collaborative, trying to cheer up the SS commander when he suffers a nervous breakdown by telling him the details of his execution and cremation.
- The Eroiken Portaferiten (combat medics) are tasked with recovering wounded soldiers from the battlefield with their stretcher. However, they are often clumsy and end up aggravating the conditions of the wounded themselves, when they are not actually looting the fallen and wounded for golden watches, golden teeth, wallets, et cetera.
- Private Bekkinen Franz (Undertaker Franz) is the battalion's undertaker, with the grim task of burying the dead. Doing so has turned himself into a grim, insensitive man, down to the point of interpreting the noise and complaints made by men buried still alive as "interference with his work" and "disrespect for the defunct".
- Soldaten Humbert (Private Humbert) is a caveman-like soldier covered in a thick fur and having very poor personal hygiene and revolting habits, taken to grotesque extremes such as eating his own lice, forcing anyone near him to wear a gas mask, and eating with his bare hands claiming that "this way, flies stick to the fingers and don't enter the mouth". He is implied to never have bathed in his life (but this is also implied of the Sergenten), and an attempt to shave off his fur results in him disappearing under a large pile of hair, raising doubts as to his actually being human. He often is shown as only capable of grunting and screaming, but in some strips he can talk normally and drive a motorcycle.
- Soldaten Sigfried von Nibelunghen (Private Sigfried von Nibelunghen) is a young recruit who proudly admits having falsified his birth certificate in order to enlist voluntarily. He eagerly volunteers to perform all sorts of dangerous or tedious tasks, such as accepting "the extraordinary honour" of performing five consecutive watch turns, or laying minefields blindfolded so that "even under torture, he would not be able to give the mines' positions away to the enemy". He also pesters the Captain to order an attack on a sun-bathed field of golden crops, so that he can die a "heroic death". He falls victim to one of his own mines, and loses all ability to communicate, rendering him a prisoner in his own body. In the end, as he considers the harsh reality of his condition against the idealized vision of war he had been led to believe, he thinks to himself, "I fear that I have been duped".

== Film adaptations ==
Sturmtruppen's success spurred two cinema adaptations. The first one, Sturmtruppen (1976), was co-written by Bonvicini and directed by Salvatore Samperi. In 1982 a sequel, Sturmtruppen 2 - Tutti al fronte, was released, again directed by Samperi and featuring Massimo Boldi and Teo Teocoli. Bonvi had a small part as a German officer.

On 16 August 2006 Miramax moved forward with plans to create a live-action movie based on Sturmtruppen.

== Videogame adaptations ==
There has been only one officially licensed video game based on the Sturmtruppen comics, on the Amiga platform, called Sturmtruppen: The Videogame published by the Italian software publisher iDea in 1992. The game was not critically well received, getting a 44% score by Amiga Joker magazine in November 1992, and 3/5 stars from Amiga Power in 1994.
