= Dead on Target (film) =

- Genre: Action drama
- Based on: Derek Flint by Hal Fimberg
- Teleplay by: Norman Klenman
- Story by: Jim McGinn
- Directed by: Joseph L. Scanlan
- Starring: Ray Danton
- Country of origin: United States
- Original language: English

Production
- Executive producer: Stanley Colbert
- Producer: R.H. Anderson
- Production location: Vancouver
- Cinematography: Kelly Duncan
- Editor: Stan Cole
- Running time: 77 minutes
- Production company: 20th Century Fox Television

Original release
- Network: ABC
- Release: March 17, 1976

Dead on Target (also titled Our Man Flint: Dead on Target) is an American action drama television film. The film originally aired on ABC on March 17, 1976, and was shot in Vancouver. The film was a backdoor pilot for a possible weekly series, but it was not picked up to series, and it became the last Derek Flint film. Ray Danton replaces James Coburn as Derek Flint, who is now a private detective and former Z.O.W.I.E. government agent. The cast also includes Sharon Acker, Susan Jane Sullivan, Lawrence Dane, Gay Rowan, Linda Woods, Donnelly Rhodes, and Kim Cattrall.

== Plot ==
Derek Flint agrees to teach a pretty young woman named Benita Ryders how to be a private eye. Their first mission together has them facing a group of terrorists called B.E.S.L.A. ("Bar El Sol Liberation Army"), who have kidnapped an oil executive. They rescue him and put B.E.S.L.A. out of business.

== Home media ==
Dead on Target was released by Fox as part of the "Ultimate Flint Collection" DVD set on November 7, 2006.

== Reception ==
In Crime and Spy Jazz on Screen, Derrick Bang calls the film "genuinely dreadful" and Danton's performance "unpersuasive". Most commentators find the film disappointing compared to Coburn's Flint, one review explaining that the original title was not referring to Our Man Flint being because the two had so little in common.
