= Dan August =

American crime drama series

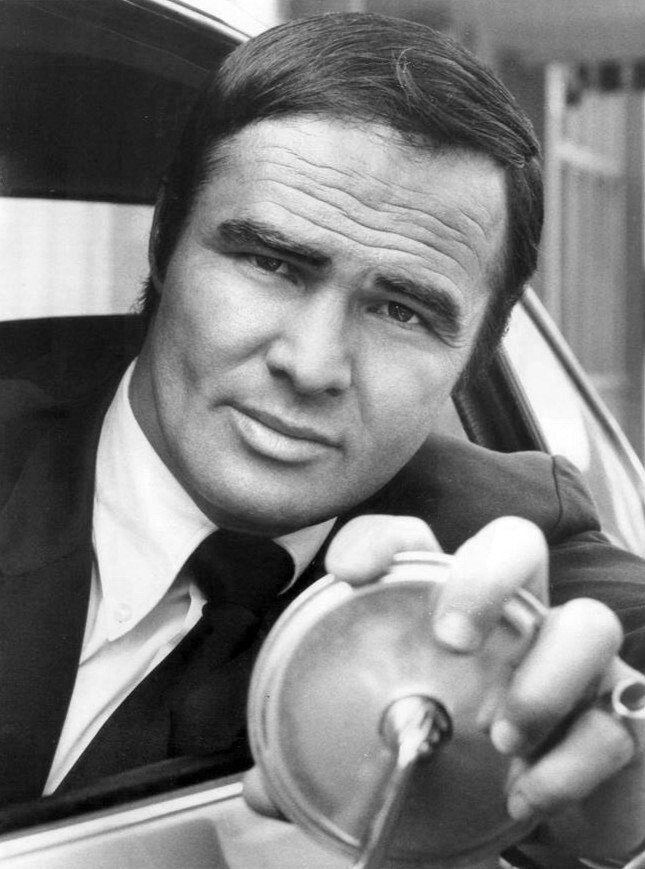
- Reynolds as Dan August
- Starring: Burt Reynolds; Norman Fell; Ned Romero; Richard Anderson; Ena Hartman
- Opening theme: "Dan August Theme" by Dave Grusin
- Composers: Dave Grusin; Dave Vincent (pilot only); Richard Markowitz; Tom Scott; Patrick Williams; Duane Tatro
- Country of origin: United States
- No. of seasons: 1
- No. of episodes: 26

Production
- Executive producer: Quinn Martin
- Camera setup: Single-camera
- Running time: 45 mins.
- Production company: QM Productions

Original release
- Network: ABC
- Release: September 23, 1970 – April 8, 1971

Dan August is an American drama series that aired on ABC from September 23, 1970, to April 8, 1971. Burt Reynolds played the title character. Reruns of the series aired in prime time on CBS from May to October 1973 and from April to June 1975.

== Premise ==
Police lieutenant Dan August investigates homicide cases in his (fictional) hometown of Santa Luisa, California. The town is supposedly based on Santa Barbara, California, but was filmed in Oxnard.

== Cast ==
- Burt Reynolds as Police Lieutenant Dan August
- Norman Fell as Sergeant Charles Wilentz, August's partner
- Richard Anderson as Police Chief Untermeyer
- Ned Romero as Sergeant Joe Rivera
- Ena Hartman as Katie Grant

Barney Phillips had a recurring role as Mike Golden, the medical examiner. John Lasell also had a recurring role as Benjamin Wedlock.

=== Guest stars ===
Guest stars including Diana Muldaur in the pilot episode "Murder by Proxy"; Martin Sheen in "Dead Witness to a Killing"; Dabney Coleman in "The King Is Dead"; Larry Hagman in "The Law"; John Ritter in "Quadrangle of Death"; and Harrison Ford, Billy Dee Williams, Mickey Rooney, David Soul, and Gary Busey in "The Manufactured Man". Ahna Capri played Linda Perry in "Death Chain" and "Prognosis: Homicide".

Other guest actors who appeared on the show include Michael Ontkean, Joan Hackett, Vera Miles, Annette O'Toole, Gary Collins, Ricardo Montalbán, Ford Rainey, Carolyn Jones, Fritz Weaver, John Marley, Janice Rule, Alexandra Hay, Norman Alden, Joan Van Ark, Bradford Dillman, Geraldine Brooks, Donna Mills, Victor French, Richard Basehart, Sherry Lansing, Monte Markham, Jan-Michael Vincent, Stephen Collins, Laurence Luckinbill, Lee Meriwether, Sal Mineo, Anna Navarro, Richard O'Brien, Fernando Lamas, Ellen Corby, Susan Oliver, John Beck, Michael Pataki, Diana Hyland, and Simon Scott.

== Episodes ==
No.	Title	Directed by	Written by	Original release date
1	"Murder by Proxy"	George Mc Cowan	Robert C. Dennis	September 23, 1970
With guest stars Diana Muldaur. Burr DeBenning. Roger Perry. and special guest star Anne Francis. Co-Starring Milton Selzer as Dr. Albert Ziegler, Ford Rainey as David Lyle, Mark Roberts as Spence. With Burke Byrnes as Officer Halsey, John Hudson as Dr. Cooper, James Devine as Peterson, Judy Strangis as Susie, Robert Wolders as Redfern. A well-known race car driver is driving recklessly, and at a very high speed. When a police car gives chase, Gabe Redfern loses control and drives into the lake. The first officer on the scene finds that the driver is naked, and that he has been shot. Dan August knew the race car driver personally. He suspects that the killer is someone close to Gabe, but everyone has an alibi.
2	"The Murder of a Small Town"	Harvey Hart	Robert Dozier	September 30, 1970
With guest star Ricardo Montalbán. and special guest star John Marley. Co-Starring Anna Navarro as Consuela, Cal Bellini as Jose, Corinne Comacho as Carlotta, Mark Roberts as Spence. With Val Avery, Bart La Rue, Joaquin Martinez, Ray Martel, Peter Hobbs, Stan Barrett, Dort Clark, Michele Salerno. A sabotaged school bus is involved in an accident that kills Sgt. Joe Rivera's niece. Dan wonders if a migrant worker's strike is connected and races to find the killer before violence breaks out.
3	"Love Is a Nickel Bag"	George Mc Cowan	Arthur Weingarten	October 7, 1970
With guest stars Brad David. Annette O'Toole. June Dayton. Co-Starring Don Dubbins as Arnold Cane, Morgan Paull as Gibbs, Morgan Sterne as Mr. Corman, Eldon Quick as Dr. Joelson. With Joyce Ames as Tara Mayson, Florence MacMichael as Mrs. Goodson, Paul Camen as Connors, Darrell Larson as Bernie Kahn, Bill Ewing as Joe Goodson. A teenage boy fatally overdoses at a wild party. In order to find the drug supplier, Dan 'sweats out' the heroin-addicted host of the party in an attempt to gain information.
4	"The King Is Dead"	Gene Nelson	Jack Turley	October 14, 1970
With guest stars Dabney Coleman. Fred Beir. Jane Elliot. and special guest star Janice Rule. Co-Starring Richard Van Vleet as Robert Gage, Mark Roberts as Spence. With Walter Coy as Alex Venable, Rose Hobart as Servant, Bill Erwin as Coroner, Warren Parker as Doctor, Douglas Mitchell as Patrolman. The philanthropist Alex Venable, who put Dan through college, is found shot to death and he doesn't buy the 'scared burglar' theory. Dan soon discovers that Venable wasn't the man he thought he was and finding the guilty party among the growing group of the old man's enemies will take all his detecting skills.
5	"In the Eyes of God"	Harvey Hart	Barry Trivers	October 21, 1970
With guest stars Bradford Dillman. James Best. Donna Mills. Co-Starring Thomas Gomez as Hector Costa, Russell Thorson as Bishop MacAlister, Mark Roberts as Spence. With Joshua Bryant, Queenie Smith, Claudia Bryar, Robert Cleaves, Pat O'Hara, Iris Korn, Don Phelps, Irene Gilbert, Matthew Knox, Bob Pickett, Martin Priest, Steve Benson, Bernadette Brookes.
6	"The Color of Fury"	Harvey Hart	William Wood	October 28, 1970
7	"Invitation to Murder"	Robert Douglas	Mel Goldberg	November 4, 1970
The spoiled brat of a daughter of a famous newspaper columnist is found dead on the beach. Dan's investigation is complicated by the columnist, who uses his forum to virtually convict the girl's hippie boyfriend.
8	"The Union Forever"	George McCowan	Chester Krumholz	November 11, 1970
With guest stars Vic Morrow, Andrew Prine. A corrupt union official is murdered and Dan's main suspect is his opponent in an upcoming election. Despite the man's claims of innocence, the evidence continues to mount that he hired hit men to kill the only person standing in his way.
9	"Epitaph for a Swinger"	Lewis Allen	Nicholas E. Baehr	November 18, 1970
10	"When the Shouting Dies"	Robert Totten	Robert Dozier (t), Robert L. Goodwin (s)	November 25, 1970
11	"The Soldier"	Lewis Allen	Stephen Kandel	December 2, 1970
With guest stars Michael Ontkean, Lynne Marta, Larry Ward, Jack Ging. Dan's attempt to clear an AWOL soldier of an MP's murder is hampered by the suspect's uncooperative friends and the victim's wife, whose motivations are murky.
12	"Quadrangle for Death"	Nicholas Webster	Norman Katkov (s/t), Stephen Kandel (t), Roland Wolpert (s)	December 16, 1970
13	"Passing Fair"	Arnold Laven	Warren Duff	December 30, 1970
14	"The Titan"	George McCowan	Richard Carr (s/t), Robert C. Dennis (t)	January 7, 1971
15	"Death Chain"	Ralph Senensky	Robert C. Dennis	January 21, 1971
16	"Dead Witness to a Killing"	Ralph Senensky	Arthur Weingarten	January 28, 1971
17	"The Law"	Ralph Senensky	Mel Goldberg	February 4, 1971
18	"The Worst Crime"	Gerald Mayer	Richard Landau	February 11, 1971
19	"Circle of Lies"	Richard Benedict	Harry Kronman	February 18, 1971
20	"Trackdown"	Jerry Jameson	Rick Husky	February 25, 1971
21	"Bullet for a Hero"	Ralph Senensky	Nicholas E. Baehr	March 4, 1971
22	"The Manufactured Man"	Richard Benedict	Arthur Dales (s), Robert C. Dennis (t)	March 11, 1971
A young woman returns to town after having been away for a year, and she's murdered just a few minutes after getting off the bus. Suspects include a popular candidate for governor, members of his campaign staff, and his son.
23	"The Meal Ticket"	Seymour Robbie	Robert Collins	March 18, 1971
24	"Days of Rage"	Ralph Senensky	Stephen Kandel (s), Richard Landau (s/t)	March 25, 1971
25	"Prognosis: Homicide"	Virgil W. Vogel	Robert C. Dennis	April 1, 1971
26	"The Assassin"	Gene Nelson	Mel Goldberg	April 8, 1971

== Production ==
Reynolds later recalled "I swore I'd never play a cop on TV because you can't make jokes or have a broad. You wind up loving your car a lot. I was halfway out the door when Quinn said the magic words – $15,000 a week."

The series was based on Quinn Martin's 1970 TV movie House on Greenapple Road, starring Janet Leigh, which was based on Harold R. Daniels' 1966 mystery novel of the same name. It was directed by Robert Day from a script by George Eckstein. Christopher George played Dan August, with Keenan Wynn as Sergeant Wilentz and Barry Sullivan as Chief Untermeyer. Ned Romero was the only actor in the film who reprised his role in the series.

== Reception and legacy ==
While the series' ratings weren't high enough to be renewed for a second season, Dan August became a fan favorite in repeats, particularly after Reynolds' popularity surged in the mid-1970s with his escalating movie career. CBS re-broadcast the series both on The CBS Late Movie and in prime time reruns, during the summer of 1973 and 1975, to larger audiences.

=== Television films ===
An ABC television movie titled Dan August: Once Is Never Enough was broadcast on January 4, 1980. The film consisted of footage from episode 15, "Death Chain" and episode 25, "Prognosis: Homicide," cut together to television film length. ABC and Quinn Martin productions were looking to capitalize on the popularity of Burt Reynolds, who was one of Hollywood's biggest stars at that time.

Four further Dan August ABC TV films were produced, all of which were edited from earlier episodes into film-length narratives. The episodes starring Diana Muldaur and Dabney Coleman, ("Murder by Proxy" and "The King Is Dead") were edited into the second film Dan August: The Jealousy Factor, which was broadcast on February 4, 1980 and was followed by three more compilations, of selected episodes Dan August: The Trouble with Women ("Epitaph for a Swinger" and "The Titan"), broadcast on June 1, 1980; Dan August: The Lady Killers ("When the Shouting Dies" and "The Worst Crime") and Dan August: Murder, My Friend ("Trackdown" and "Bullet for a Hero"), were both broadcast in November, 1980.

=== Home media ===
On December 7, 2018, Visual Entertainment released the complete series on DVD in Region 1. The set includes "House on Greenapple Road" with Christopher George as August.
