= Wilshire Boulevard =

Major thoroughfare in the United States

- Interactive map of Wilshire Boulevard
- Namesake: Gaylord Wilshire
- Length: 15.83 mi (25.48 km)
- Location: Los Angeles County, California, United States
- Nearest metro station: : Wilshire/La Cienega; Wilshire/Fairfax; Wilshire/La Brea; Wilshire/Western; Wilshire/Normandie; Wilshire/Vermont; Westlake/MacArthur Park; 7th St/Metro Center
- West end: Ocean Avenue in Santa Monica
- Major junctions: I-405 in Los Angeles; SR 110 in Downtown Los Angeles
- East end: Grand Avenue in Downtown Los Angeles

Wilshire Boulevard (/ˈwɪlʃər/ WIL-shər) is a prominent 15.83 mi (25.48 km) boulevard in the Los Angeles area of Southern California, extending from Ocean Avenue in the city of Santa Monica east to Grand Avenue in the Financial District of downtown Los Angeles. One of the principal east–west arterial roads of Los Angeles, it is also one of the major city streets through the city of Beverly Hills. Wilshire Boulevard runs roughly parallel to Santa Monica Boulevard from Santa Monica to the west boundary of Beverly Hills. From the east boundary, it runs a block south of Sixth Street to its terminus.

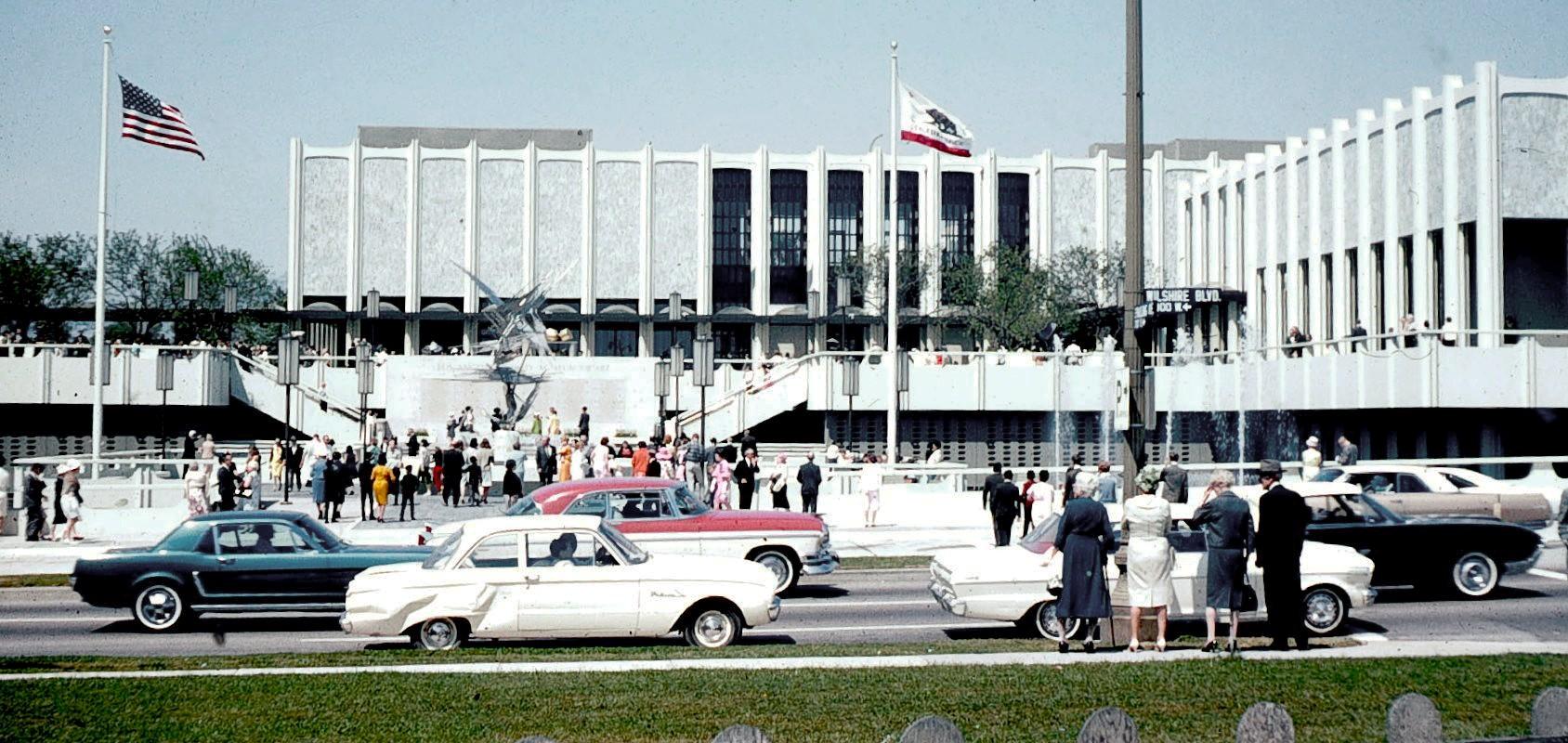
Wilshire Boulevard and the Los Angeles County Museum of Art, 1965

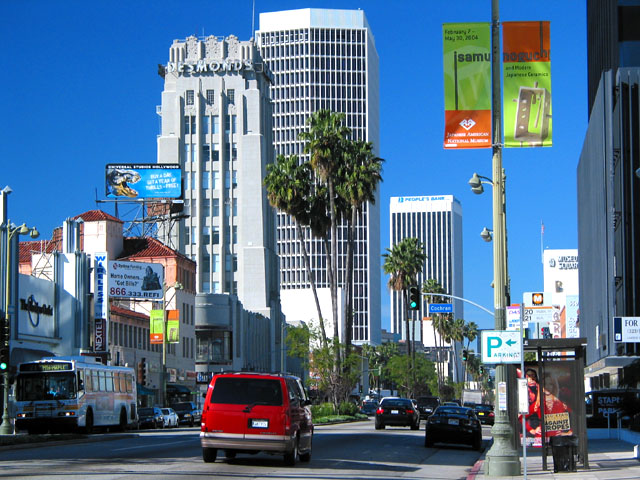
The Miracle Mile

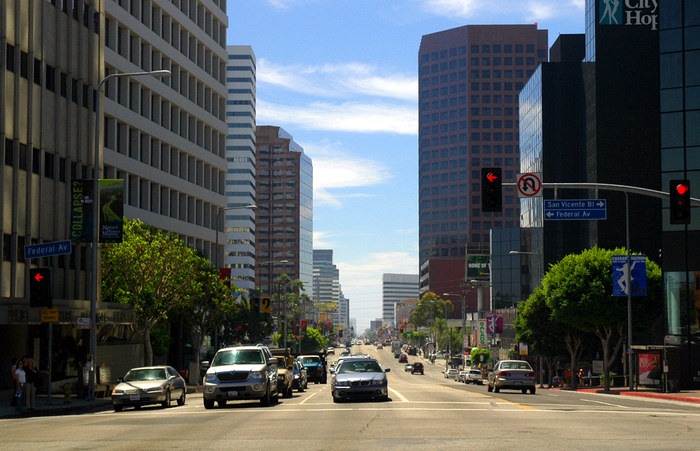
Wilshire Boulevard in West Los Angeles

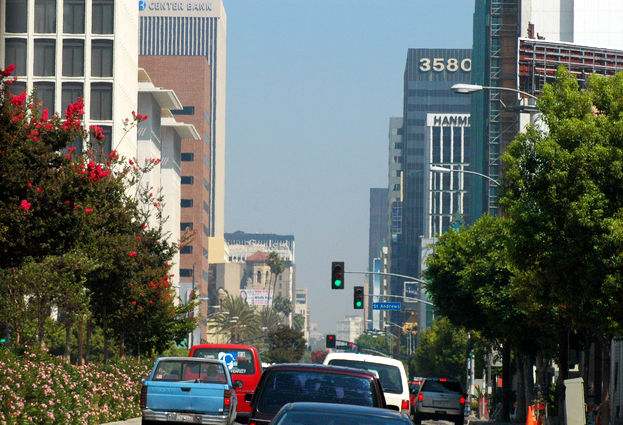
Wilshire Boulevard in Koreatown

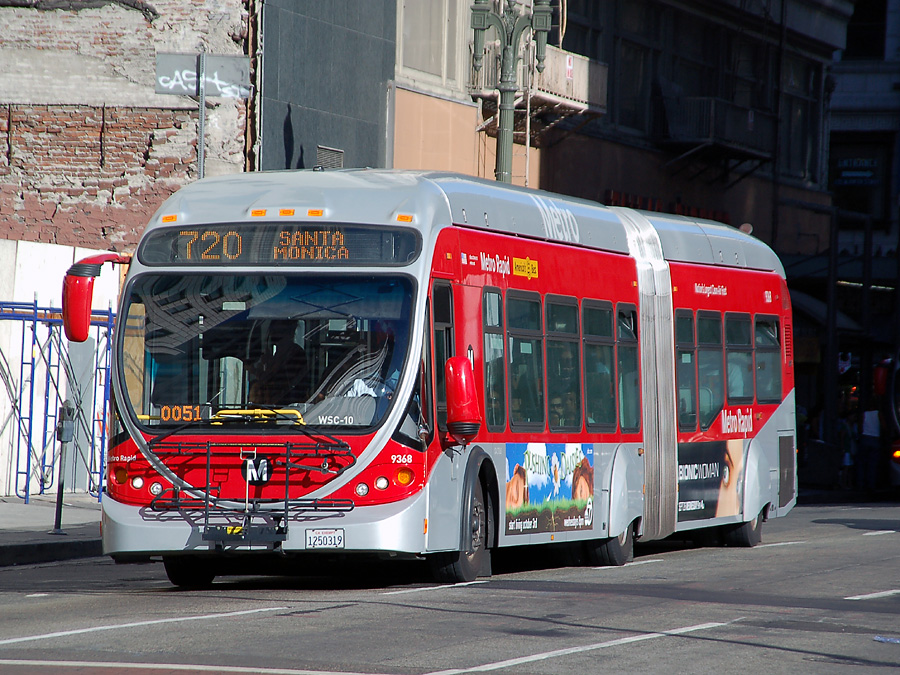
Metro Rapid 720 bus headed to Santa Monica

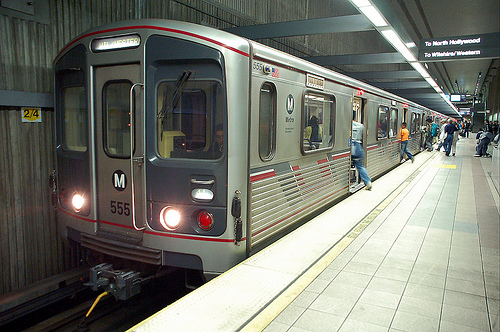
D Line train

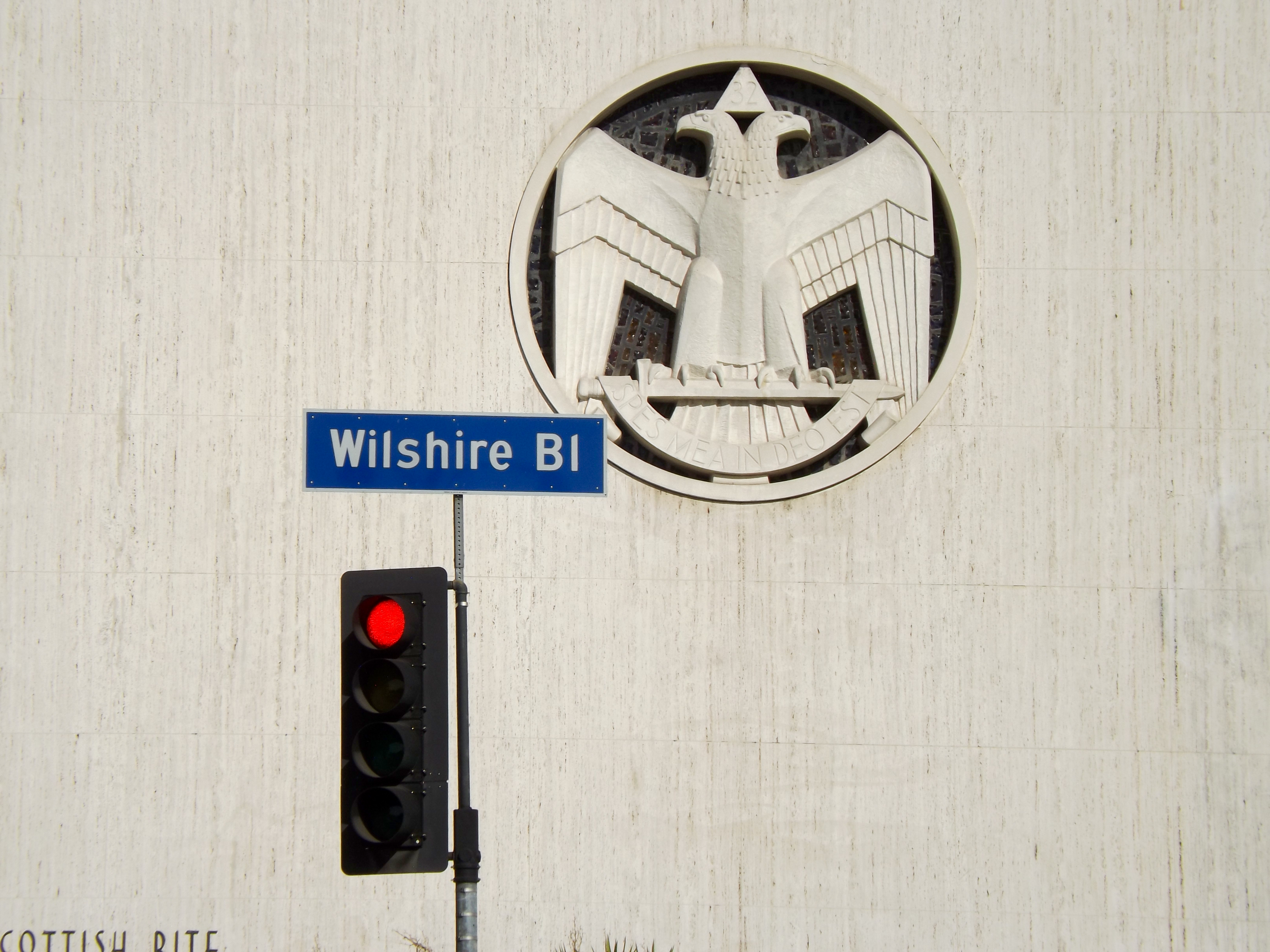
Wilshire Boulevard street sign at Scottish Rite Temple, 2015

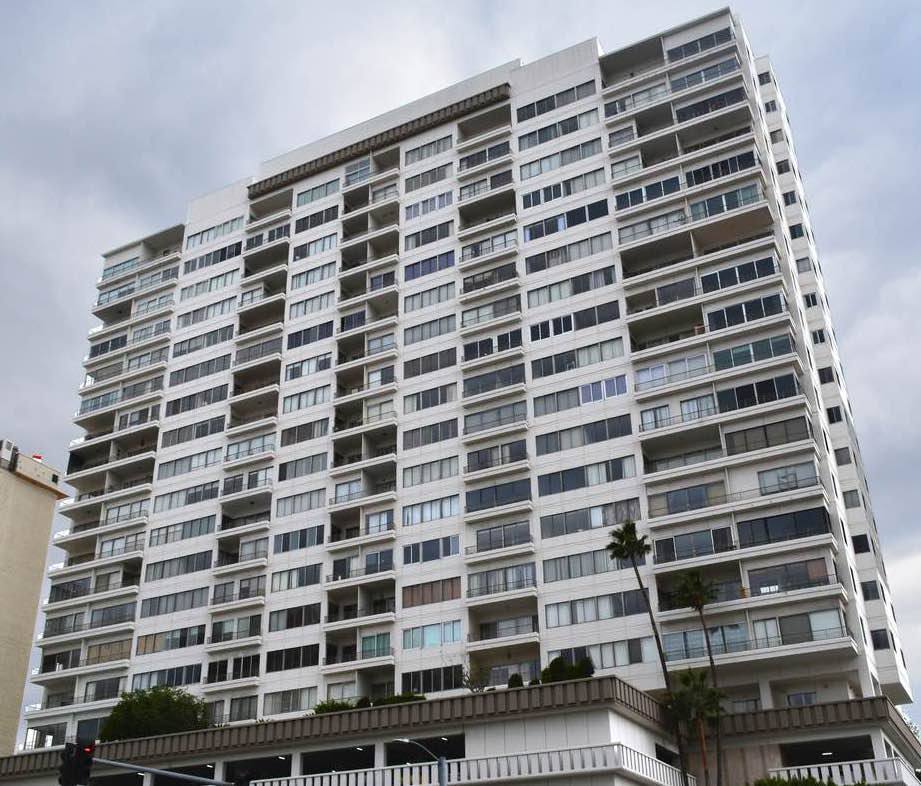
The Wilshire Regent

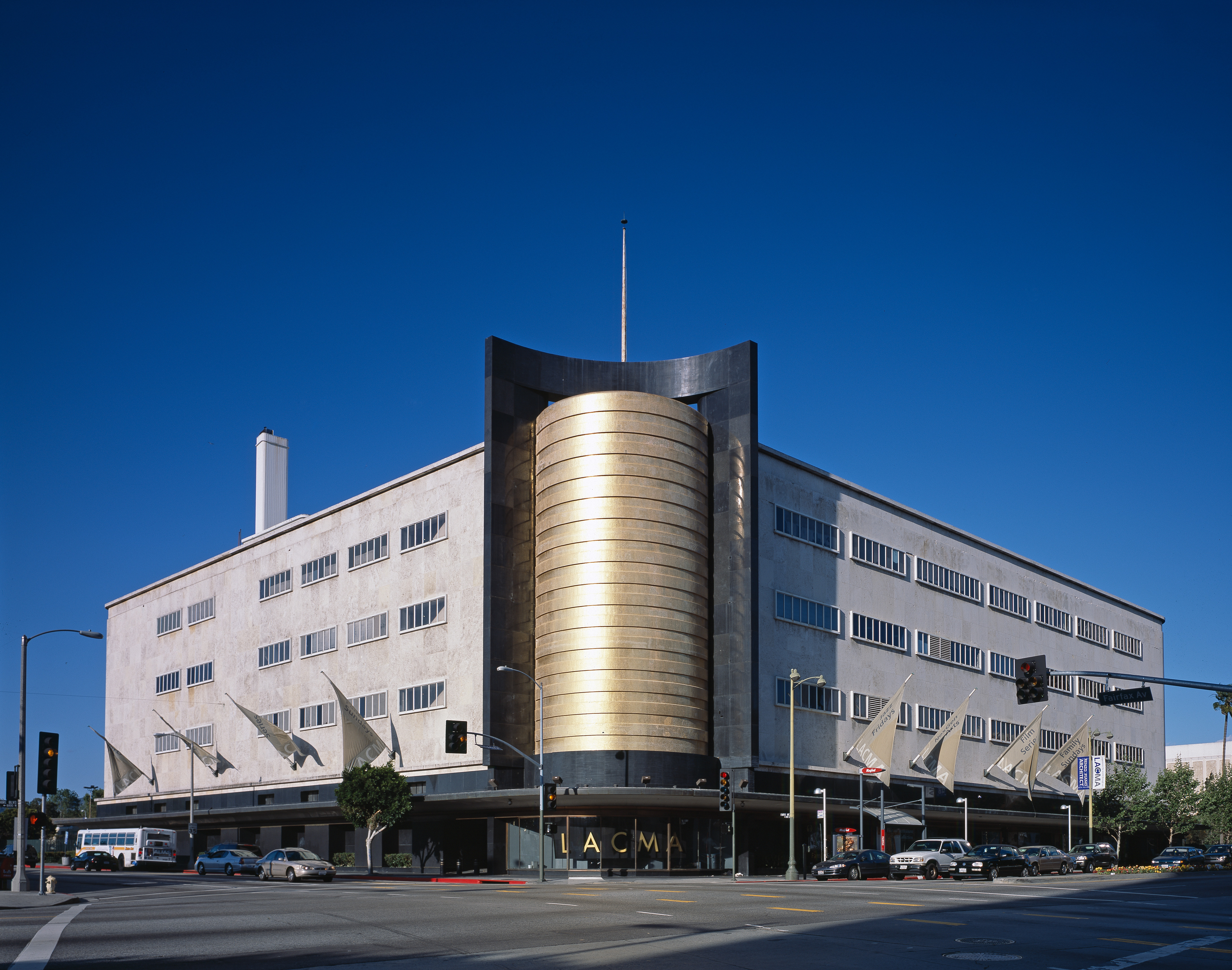
LACMA West (formerly the May Company Department Store)

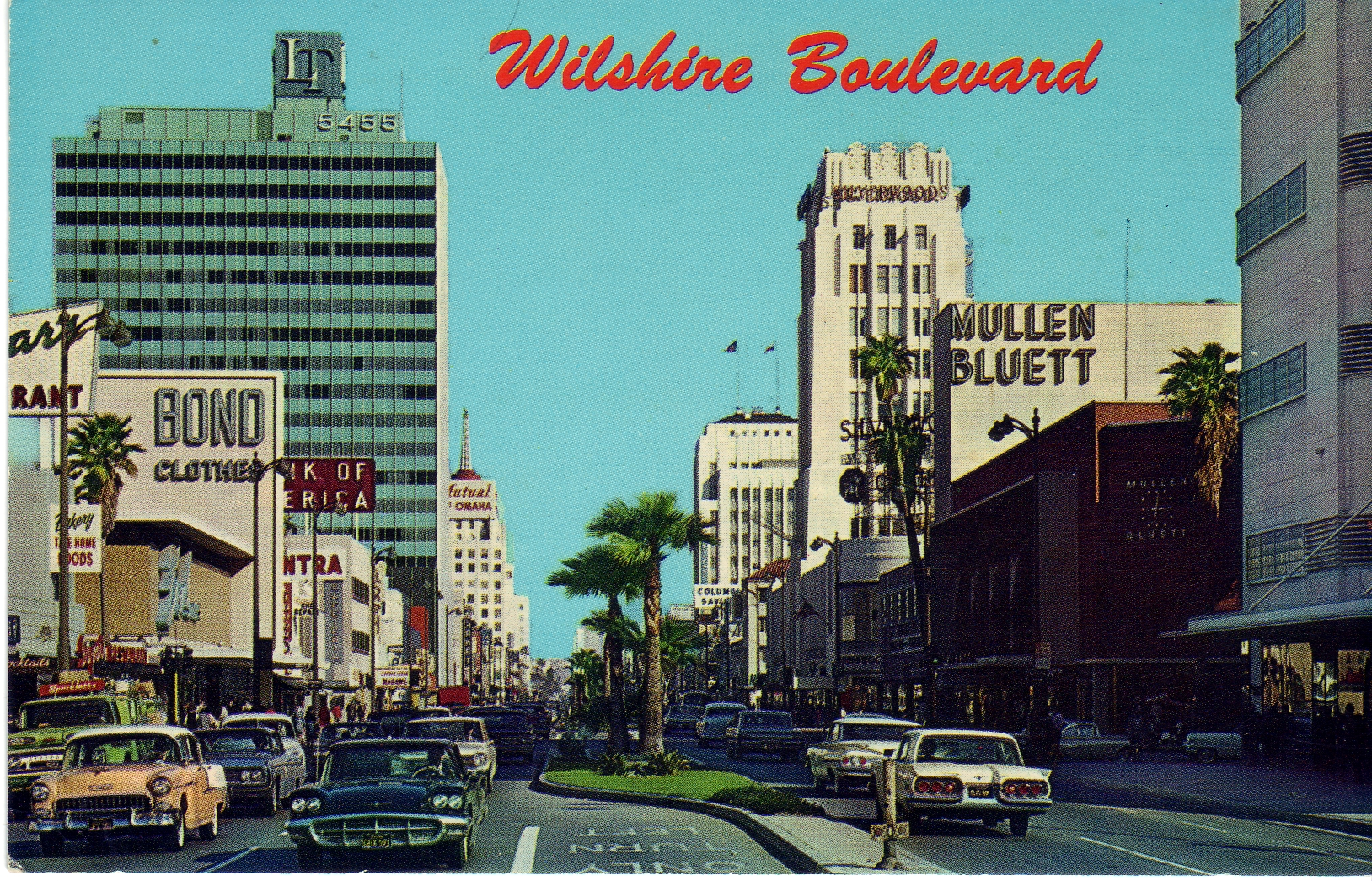
Wilshire Boulevard through Miracle Mile in the 1960s

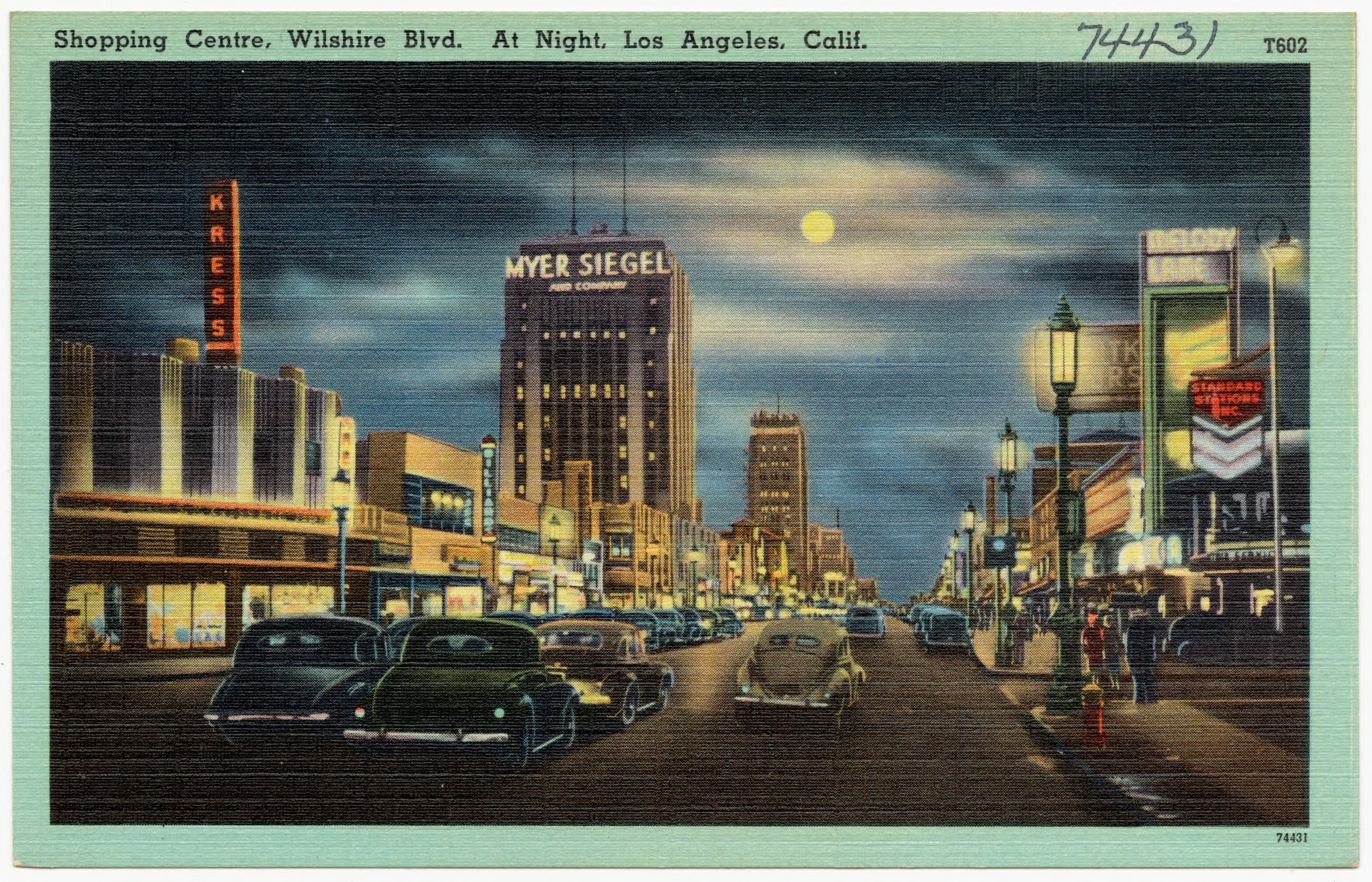
Wilshire Boulevard through Miracle Mile in the 1930s

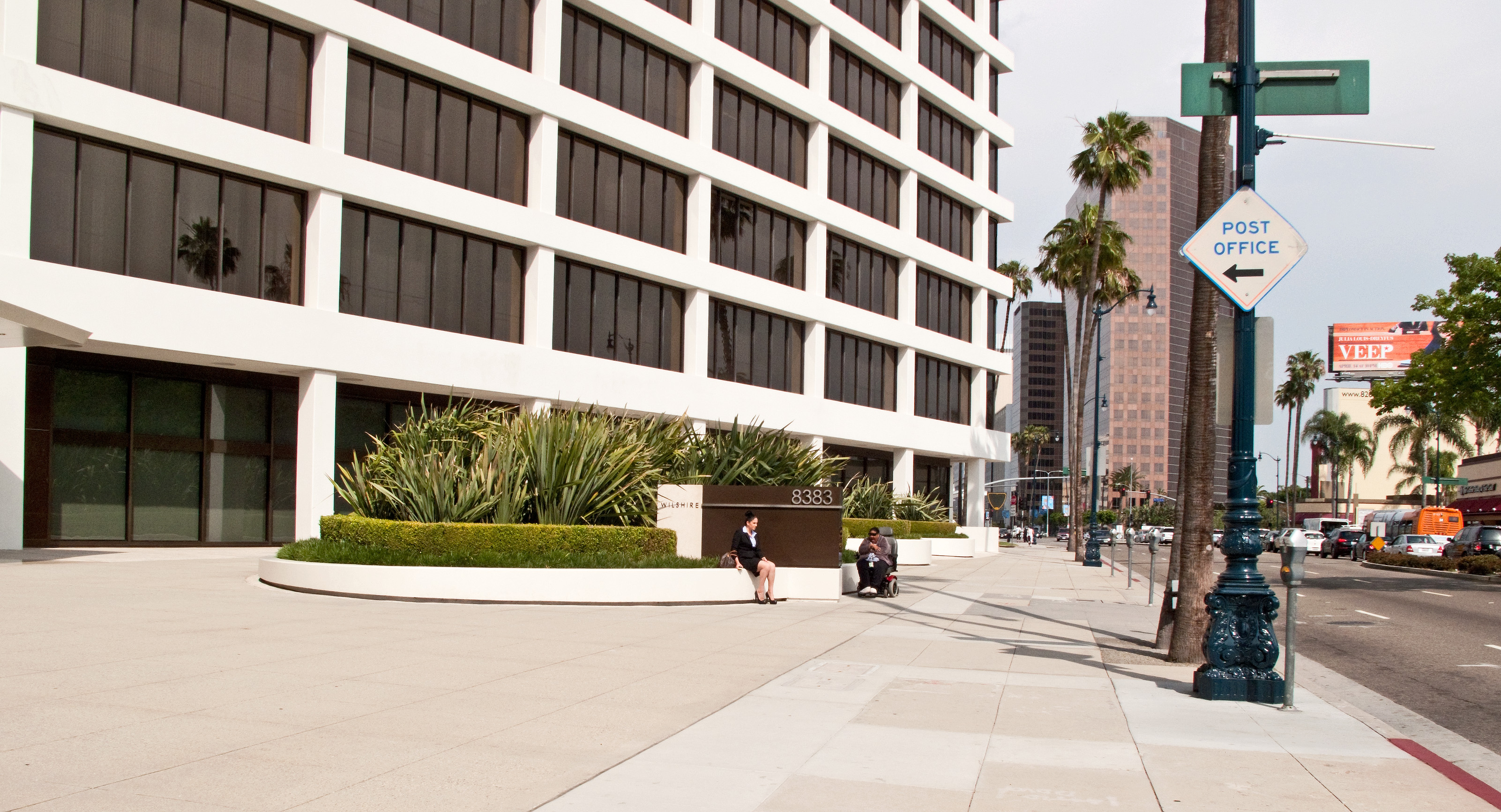
Wilshire Boulevard at the eastern border of Beverly Hills

Wilshire Boulevard is densely developed throughout most of its span, connecting five of Los Angeles's major business districts and Beverly Hills. Many of the post-1956 skyscrapers in Los Angeles are located along Wilshire; for example, the Wilshire Grand Center, the tallest building in California, sits at the intersection of Figueroa Street. One Wilshire, built in 1966 at the junction of Wilshire and Grand, is said to be "the main hub of the internet for the entire Pacific Rim" because so many telecommunications companies rent space there. Aon Center, Los Angeles' third-largest tower, is at 707 Wilshire Boulevard in downtown Los Angeles.

The stretch of the boulevard between Fairfax and Highland Avenues, known as the Miracle Mile, is home to many of Los Angeles's largest museums and cultural institutions. The area just to the east, between Highland Avenue and Wilton Place, is referred to as the Park Mile. Between Westwood and Holmby Hills, several tall glitzy condominium buildings overlook this part of Wilshire, which is variously referred to as Millionaire's Mile, the Wilshire Corridor, and Condo Canyon.

The Wilshire Corridor, located next to Century City, is one of Los Angeles's busiest districts, and contains many high-rise residential towers. The Fox and MGM studios are located in a series of skyscrapers, along with many historic Los Angeles hotels.

Wilshire Boulevard is also the principal street of Koreatown, the site of many of Los Angeles' oldest buildings and skyscrapers. Koreatown and Mid-Wilshire are among Los Angeles's most densely populated districts.

== History ==
=== The Calle de los Indios ===
Wilshire Boulevard originated as one of the central pathways constructed by the Tongva tribes residing in the region prior to the exploration of the conquistadores. At the time of the founding of Los Angeles, Wilshire Boulevard was one of the main arteries connecting the largest Tongva village in the area, then known as Yaanga, which eventually became Union Station, to the Pacific Ocean.

From the founding of Los Angeles through nearly all of the 1800s, Wilshire Boulevard was known as "Calle de los Indios" (Indians' Street).

Before the Spanish settlements of Los Angeles, much of the length of Wilshire Boulevard can be traced back to the indigenous Tongva people who used it to bring back tar from the La Brea pits in today's Miracle Mile section of Wilshire Blvd, back to their settlement on the coast. This road was later used by Spanish explorers and settlers, calling it El Camino Viejo ('The Old Road'). The route that ultimately became Wilshire crossed the original pueblo of Los Angeles and five of the original Spanish land grants, or ranchos.

Wilshire was pieced together from various streets over several decades. It began in the 1870s as Nevada Avenue in Santa Monica, and in the 1880s as Orange Street between Westlake (now MacArthur) Park and downtown. Nevada and Orange were later renamed as parts of Wilshire.

=== As Wilshire Boulevard ===
In 1895, Henry Gaylord Wilshire (1861–1927), a developer, publisher, and revolutionary who made and lost fortunes in real estate, farming, and gold mining, donated land to the City of Los Angeles for a boulevard stretching westward from a tract of luxury homes he was developing in Westlake Park (today's MacArthur Park). His conditions for the donation of the 120 ft (37 m) wide by 1,200 ft (370 m) long strip of land along the 35 acres (14 ha) barley field he was subdividing were that it be named for him and that railroad lines and commercial or industrial trucking would be banned. The road first appeared on a map under its present name in 1895. A historic apartment building on the corner of Wilshire Boulevard and South Kenmore Avenue, the Gaylord, carries his middle name.

Wilshire Boulevard formerly ended at the MacArthur Park lake, but in 1934 a berm was built for it to cross and link up with the existing Orange Street (which ran from Figueroa to Alvarado) into downtown Los Angeles. Orange Street was renamed Wilshire and extended east of Figueroa to Grand. This divided the lake into two halves; the northern half was later drained.

The Wilshire Boulevard home of J. Paul Getty was used as the film set for the 1950 film Sunset Boulevard: it was demolished in 1957.

== Transportation ==
All of the boulevard is at least four lanes in width, and most of the portion between Hoover Street and Robertson Boulevard has a raised center median. The widest portion of the boulevard is located in the business district of central Westwood, where mobs of pedestrians crossing Wilshire at Westwood Boulevard must traverse ten lanes (including two left-turn pockets). According to a 1991 study by the Los Angeles Department of Transportation, this and the nearby intersection of Wilshire and Veteran are among the busiest in Los Angeles.

=== LA Metro Rail ===
The B and D subway lines of the Los Angeles Metro Rail run along Wilshire Boulevard from just past the 7th Street/Metro Center before serving the Westlake/MacArthur Park and Wilshire/Vermont stations, where the D Line continues along Wilshire Boulevard to serve five stations between Koreatown and the eastern edge of Beverly Hills, while the B Line branches off north along Vermont Avenue to eventually terminate in North Hollywood.

The construction of the future D Line Extension along Wilshire Boulevard commenced in November 2014. The first phase of the extension between Wilshire/Western station and Wilshire/La Cienega station, opened on May 8, 2026. The second phase launched on February 23, 2018 from Wilshire/La Cienega to the Century City Station, and it is expected to be completed in 2027. Phase 3 of the D Line extension, when fully completed, will extend to UCLA and Westwood/VA Hospital, and will follow Wilshire Boulevard for most of its route. That part will be completed in 2028 in time for the 2028 Summer Olympics held in Los Angeles, as the Westwood/UCLA station will serve the Olympic Village. Phase four to downtown Santa Monica is still in the planning stages and is not yet funded.

=== LA Metro bus routes ===
Metro Local Line 20, Metro Rapid Line 720, and Santa Monica Transit Line 2 operate along Wilshire Boulevard. Due to the high ridership of line 720, 60-foot (18 m) NABI & New Flyer articulated buses are used on this route, and bus lanes are in place along some segments of the line.

The aging sections of Wilshire Boulevard in the city of Los Angeles are notorious for their giant potholes.

== Communities from west to east ==
Wilshire Boulevard runs through or near the following communities:

- Santa Monica (city)
- Brentwood (neighborhood)
- Sawtelle (neighborhood)
- Westwood (neighborhood)
- Beverly Hills (city)
- Miracle Mile (historic stretch of the boulevard)
- Carthay Circle (neighborhood) – boulevard flanks northern edge
- Hancock Park (neighborhood) – boulevard flanks southern edge
- Windsor Square (neighborhood) – boulevard flanks southern edge
- Wilshire Park (neighborhood)
- Wilshire Center (neighborhood) / Koreatown (neighborhood)
- Westlake (neighborhood)
- Downtown Los Angeles

== Landmarks from west to east ==
- Santa Monica sculpture
- Los Angeles National Cemetery
- Wilshire Federal Building
- Hammer Museum
- Westwood Village Memorial Park Cemetery
- Sephardic Temple Tifereth Israel
- Wilshire Regent
- Sinai Temple
- Los Angeles Country Club
- Beverly Hilton Hotel
- The Regent Beverly Wilshire Hotel
- Rodeo Drive
- Sterling Plaza
- Academy of Motion Picture Arts and Sciences
- Larry Flynt Publications
- Saban Theatre (formerly Fox Wilshire Theater)
- Johnie's Coffee Shop
- Petersen Automotive Museum
- Academy Museum of Motion Pictures
- Hancock Park
- Los Angeles County Museum of Art
- Los Angeles Wave Headquarters
- La Brea Tar Pits and George C. Page Museum
- El Rey Theatre
- E. Clem Wilson Building
- Ebell of Los Angeles
- Los Altos Apartments
- Pellissier Building and Wiltern Theatre
- Wilshire Boulevard Temple
- St. Basil Catholic Church
- Robert F. Kennedy Community Schools (former site of the Ambassador Hotel)
- Southwestern University School of Law (in the former Bullocks Wilshire department store)
- The Town House
- Lafayette Park
- Bryson Apartment Hotel
- Park Plaza Hotel
- MacArthur Park (formerly Westlake Park)
- Good Samaritan Hospital
- Wilshire Grand Tower

== Major intersections ==
A video of the intersection of Wilshire Blvd. and S. Figuerora St. in February 2024.

The entire route is in Los Angeles County.

Location	mi	km	Destinations	Notes
Santa Monica	0	0.0	Ocean Avenue	
Santa Monica	0.5	0.80	Lincoln Boulevard	
	3.9	6.3	I-405 (San Diego Freeway) – Sacramento, Long Beach	Interchange; former SR 7; I-405 exit 55B
	4.0	6.4	Sepulveda Boulevard	
Los Angeles	4.5	7.2	Westwood Boulevard	
Los Angeles	5.5	8.9	Beverly Glen Boulevard	
Beverly Hills	6.6	10.6	SR 2 (Santa Monica Boulevard)	
Beverly Hills	8.2	13.2	Robertson Boulevard	
Beverly Hills	8.6	13.8	La Cienega Boulevard	
Los Angeles	9.5	15.3	Fairfax Avenue	
Los Angeles	10.5	16.9	La Brea Avenue	
Los Angeles	11.9	19.2	Crenshaw Boulevard	
Los Angeles	12.5	20.1	Western Avenue	
Los Angeles	13.1	21.1	Normandie Avenue / Irolo Street	
Los Angeles	13.6	21.9	Vermont Avenue	
Los Angeles	14.6	23.5	Alvarado Street	
Los Angeles	15.6	25.1	SR 110 – San Pedro, Pasadena	Interchange; SR 110 exit 23A
Los Angeles	15.7	25.3	Figueroa Street	Former US 6
Los Angeles	15.9	25.6	Grand Avenue	
1.000 mi = 1.609 km; 1.000 km = 0.621 mi

== See also ==
- Ernest L. Webster, Los Angeles City Council member, 1927–31, helped introduce traffic-signal system
- Harold A. Henry, Los Angeles City Council president active in beautifying the boulevard
