= Sephardic Temple Tifereth Israel =

Jewish synagogue in Los Angeles, California

- Location in Los Angeles

Religion
- Affiliation: Judaism
- Rite: Sephardi
- Ecclesiastical or organisational status: Synagogue
- Leadership: Rabbi Refael Cohen
- Status: Active

Location
- Location: 10500 Wilshire Boulevard, Westwood, Los Angeles, California 90024
- Country: United States
- Coordinates: 34°03′51″N 118°25′56″W

Architecture
- Established: 1920 (as a congregation)
- Completed: 1981
- Materials: Jerusalem stone

Website
- sephardictemple.org

Sephardic Temple Tifereth Israel, also called The Sephardic Temple, is an unaffiliated Jewish congregation and synagogue that adopts Sephardi nusach, located at 10500 Wilshire Boulevard, in Westwood, Los Angeles, California, in the United States. Established on February 1, 1920 as the "Sephardic Community of Los Angeles", the congregation exists today as the merger of three major Sephardic organizations with approximately 600 member families.

== Overview ==
Sephardic Temple Tifereth Israel is a modern synagogue in the Sephardic tradition. It is the largest Sephardic synagogue in California, and one of the largest in the country. The synagogue offers spiritual, cultural and social activities, including daily morning minyan, Shabbat services, Torah classes, a Men's Club, Sisterhood, and Young Professional events. Sephardic Temple offers orthodox services, and maintains its own blend of traditional Judaism with openness to modern life. However, it is not formally affiliated with any specific Jewish stream or movement. In the words of its cantor, Hazan Haim Mizrahi: "We are simply traditional, and Sephardic". This traditionalism appeals to families who feel disengaged from liberal Judaism, and yet do not fully subscribe to Orthodoxy at the same time.

== History ==
The history of the Sephardic Temple reflects the history of the Sephardic community in Los Angeles. The first Sephardi Jews arrived in Los Angeles in c. 1853. However, significant numbers of Sephardim came in the early 20th century from places such as Egypt, Rhodes, Salonica, Turkey, and other regions of the former Ottoman Empire and elsewhere in the Middle East.

These early Sephardi immigrants to Los Angeles founded the Avat Shalom Society in 1912 to unify Jewish immigrants coming from the Ottoman Empire; however, the society soon dissolved. In 1917, the Peace and Progress Society was formed mostly by immigrants from the island of Rhodes. In 1935 the name was changed to the Sephardic Hebrew Center and later to Sephardic Beth Shalom. Others organized the Haim VaHessed Society ("Sephardic Brotherhood") of Los Angeles.

On February 1, 1920, 39 Turkish elders of the Sephardi community formed the Sephardic Community of Los Angeles ("La Communidad"). Rabbi Abraham Caraco served as the first rabbi of the community. Minutes from the first meeting note that monthly dues would be $1 for each member. In 1924, the Sephardic Community of Los Angeles purchased the property for a synagogue at 52nd Street and Second Avenue in southwest Los Angeles. The synagogue was never built at this location due to funds nearly being exhausted. Rabbi Caraco died in 1925, with Rabbi David Tovi serving from 1925 through World War II. By 1928, membership increased to the point where the property was sold, and a new larger site was purchased for $12,000 on the corner of Santa Barbara Avenue (now Martin Luther King Jr. Blvd) and LaSalle Avenue in the West Adams neighborhood of South Los Angeles. Groundbreaking ceremonies took place on September 1, 1931 with 125 members, and the new Santa Barbara Avenue Temple was dedicated on February 21, 1932 with invited guests including the mayor of Los Angeles.

Following World War II, the congregation started a choir and increased the frequency of Friday night services. Rabbi Tovi died and was replaced by Rabbi Axelrod, who in turn was replaced by Rabbi Friedman of Florence, Italy. Rabbi Friedman eventually resigned due to intra-congregational squabbling.

In 1959, the Sephardic Community of Los Angeles merged with the Haim VaHessed Society ("Sephardic Brotherhood"), forming the Sephardic Community and Brotherhood of Los Angeles. Rabbi Jacob M. Ott was invited to be the spiritual leader of the community on a trial basis, and ended up serving as Senior Rabbi until his retirement in 1992. By 1970, the congregation outgrew the Santa Barbara Avenue Temple and broke ground at the current Wilshire Boulevard and Warner Avenue site in Westwood for a new synagogue. The building would not be finally dedicated until September 15, 1981, when California Governor Jerry Brown addressed a crowd of over 1000 guests during a dedication ceremony.

On October 1, 1987, King Juan Carlos I and Queen Sofía of Spain visited the temple, reported to be the first visit to a synagogue by a Spanish king since the expulsion of the Jews from Spain in 1492. In 1993, the newly named Sephardic Temple Tifereth Israel merged with Sephardic Beth Shalom, uniting all three major original Sephardic congregations in Los Angeles. In 1994 the temple installed a group of "Sephardic Heritage" stained glass windows by Israeli artist Raphael Abecassis.

Rabbi Ott's successor, Rabbi Daniel Bouskila, was raised and became bar mitzvah at the temple, and became the senior rabbi two years after being hired out of Yeshiva University's rabbinical school. Under his leadership the temple's Hebrew school grew considerably, as did attendance at services. After 17 years, Bouskila decided to step down in Feb. 2010 at the age of 45 to become director of the Sephardic Educational Center.

His successor as Senior Rabbi was Rabbi Jay Shasho Levy, J.D, from Feb. 2010 to May 2013. Levy is from a Sephardic family with roots in Spain, Aleppo and Gaziantep.

In 2013, Sephardic Temple Tifereth Israel appointed Tal Sessler as Senior Rabbi. Sessler formerly served as the Rabbi of Freehold Jewish Center in New Jersey, and earlier as the Rabbi of the Jewish Center of Forest Hills West in New York. Rabbi Sessler left the Temple in May 2021. Rabbi Refael Cohen is the current Senior Rabbi. The Cantor is Haim Mizrahi and the Gabbai is Edward Mizrahi.
