= Derek Flint =

Fictional spy

Derek Flint is a fictional world adventurer and master spy featured in a series of movies and comic books. Flint, a parody of James Bond and Doc Savage, is an agent for Z.O.W.I.E. (Zonal Organization World Intelligence Espionage).

== Origins ==
In 1965, 20th Century Fox presented its own version of a master spy to take on United Artists' popular James Bond franchise. The first three James Bond movies had already made considerable money for that studio. Fox decided to try for itself with an original character, not based on books.

== Fictional profile ==
Derek Flint was the creation of Hal Fimberg, whose writing credentials, though sparse, did go back quite a few years. Whether it was in keeping with a growing trend to try to "out-Bond Bond" or, more likely, to spoof the macho Double-0 agent, Flint was the best at whatever he did and he did a lot. The abilities and achievements of Derek Flint are far too numerous to list here. Just a few include a black belt in Judo, Olympic medals in at least five different events, degrees from 17 different universities, creation of highly prized paintings, and the ability to speak fluently in 45 languages and dialects.

Derek Flint created the sonic amplifier, which was a tuning fork shaped brass fork that hooks into a cigarette lighter and could be seen moving a pool cue ball around on the table by sonic force. By adjusting the meter to a specific pitch, he is able to explode the ball by mere sonic force. This is perhaps a bit of foreshadowing of events to come. Flint uses his belt buckle/sonic manipulator to shatter the glass to his cell and free himself and before both are frozen in suspended animation. Later, in the Virgin Islands, Flint's escape from the space capsule to the Orbiting Space Platform. Using one secret device, Derek Flint ensnares General Carter with a cigarette lighter grappling hook gun. Flint exits the space capsule as easily as jumping out of an airplane and propels himself toward the space station using his sonic vibrator. Flint, using his all-in-one device, launches a grappling hook and manages to slide along his way across the tight rope from one roof top to another, and once again, retracting his grappling hook device, he escapes to safely via a rooftop air shaft.

According to his "boss", Lloyd C. Cramden, Flint was the most undisciplined, insubordinate man he had ever had to deal with. During World War II, Cramden was Flint's senior officer and as such had the task of trying to lead him. When a crisis arises that demands someone of Flint's abilities, Cramden has to mend fences and get Derek to help save the world.

== Films ==
The first movie, Our Man Flint (1965), did well and turned star James Coburn into a leading man. From gruff, simmering ruffian-style characters he had played before, Coburn portrayed a suave, sophisticated man-of-the-world and he did so with the same ease that he had played the coarser roles.

In 1967, Coburn reprised the role in In Like Flint This movie did not perform as well and the theatrical franchise stopped at two.

== Unproduced screenplay ==
Flintlock, a 1972 script by Harlan Ellison (primarily a writer of short-form fiction and nonfiction, but also a screenwriter), never saw production. It did subsequently appear in print, both in the retrospective The Essential Ellison and in standalone print form. If produced, the script would have acted as a TV Movie pilot for a TV series starring the character.

== TV movie ==
In 1976, ABC aired a TV movie, Dead on Target, starring Ray Danton as Flint. Like the Ellison script, it was intended as a pilot for a possible series that did not materialise.

== Novels ==
In Our Man Flint by Jack Pearl (1964), a villainous group of scientists have banded together as "GALAXY". With a weather control device of their invention, they plan on changing it in a drastic fashion, they wish to plan to extort from the governments of the world total disarmament to bring about peace and give GALAXY the chance to "correctly" rule the planet.

In Bradford Street's 1967 sequel, In Like Flint, feminists have decided to take over the world. The first step is to replace the male leaders of the major powers with identical replicas. After the President is replaced, Cramden begins to suspect and calls in Derek Flint to solve the problem.

== Comics ==
In 2011 Moonstone Books released That Man Flint, a one-shot comic written by Gary Phillips and drawn by Kevin Jones. Its synopsis read: Mods, mini-skirts and Vietnam. Paisley shirts and satellites. Afros and lasers. The Cold War is hot, and the Red Chinese aren't the only ones doing the brainwashing. Love is in the air, but everyone isn't groovy.

Derek Flint, inventor, ballet instructor, editor and contributor of the revised Kama Sutra, transcendentalist and translator of an ancient Mayan cookbook, seeker of the third eye and freelance spy, is the one M.A.C.E. (Mandated Actions for Covert Enforcement) calls on to tackle their most perilous assignments.

From crazed Nazi scientists hatching dastardly plans, sultry Russian spies with killer bodies and kung fu grips, super strength cyborg assassins, to fiendish henchmen and quixotic masterminds, these are examples of adversaries mystery writer Gary Phillips (Operator 5 and Decimator Smith) will throw at the cool, collected Mr. Flint. With his gadgets and skills, aided by his quartet of brainy glamour gals, That Man Flint is a retro revisionist series capturing the fun, feel and excitement of halcyon espionage fare such as The Man from U.N.C.L.E., Bond in Goldfinger, and Steranko's Nick Fury for today's audience.

== In popular culture ==
In the movie Austin Powers: The Spy Who Shagged Me, the main character Austin Powers (while being on honeymoon with his new wife Vanessa Kensington) switches on the television to a scene from In Like Flint. He mentions to Vanessa that it is his favorite movie. Also, in all three Austin Powers movies, the Emergency Red Telephone ring was a variation on the Flint films' Presidential Red Telephone ring.

The emblem of the Galaxy organization, which was composed of crossed ellipses with a "G" in the middle and appeared on the uniforms of its members, was reused for those of the civilian aerospace transport firm of Land of the Giants, after rotating it ninety degrees clockwise.

Derek Flint is mentioned in the Beastie Boys song "Grasshopper Unit" from Hello Nasty.

== Parodies ==
Flint was parodied in Eurospy films where Raimondo Vianello played "Derek Flit" in Il vostro super agente Flit (1966) and Italian comic book artist Franco "Bonvi" Bonvicini played "Derek Flit" in Franco and Ciccio's Come rubammo la bomba atomica (1967)
