= Ben Starr (television producer) =

American television writer and producer (1921–2014)

- Born: Benjamin Starr; October 18, 1921; New York City, United States
- Died: January 19, 2014 (aged 92); Los Angeles, California, United States
- Occupations: Television producer, creator and writer
- Notable work: Silver Spoons (co-creator); The Facts of Life (developer); Our Man Flint (co-writer)
- Spouse: Gloria Kaplan (m. 1949–1999; her death)
- Children: 3

Benjamin Starr (October 18, 1921 – January 19, 2014) was an American television producer, creator, writer and playwright.

== Biography ==
Born in Manhattan, New York, to Jewish Russian immigrants, Starr grew up in Brooklyn and worked in his parents' doughnut factory. He attended City College, later graduated from UCLA, and served in World War II. He became a second lieutenant navigator stationed in England and received the Distinguished Flying Cross. He flew 35 missions on B-17s and was once shot down.

After the military, he began writing comedy for radio stars, such as Al Jolson, Dean Martin, Jerry Lewis and George Burns. He started his television writing career for the live program Climax!.

Starr co-created the sitcom Silver Spoons, helped develop The Facts of Life, and was a regular screenwriter for the popular series Mister Ed and All in the Family. He also wrote for such comedies as Chico and the Man, Maude, The Andy Griffith Show, Petticoat Junction and The Many Loves of Dobie Gillis. He is notably credited for writing The Brady Bunch episode "The Personality Kid" in which Peter Brady (Christopher Knight) delivers his Humphrey Bogart impersonation of "pork chops and applesauce". Starr also penned the Diff'rent Strokes line "What are you talking about, Willis?", in which Gary Coleman delivered in his own way and made it a catchphrase.

Starr also co-wrote the screenplays for the 1966 James Bond parody Our Man Flint, the 1966 Western satire Texas Across the River and the animated versions of Treasure Island (1972) and Oliver Twist (1974). He also wrote plays, including Broadway's The Family Way in 1965. The 2012 documentary Lunch featured Starr, along with Sid Caesar, Carl Reiner and other career comedy writers and performers who reflected on the genre and the industry.

== Personal life ==
Starr was married to his wife Gloria Kaplan for 50 years, until her death in 1999. They had three children. At age 92, Starr died of congestive heart failure in 2014 at his home in Los Angeles.
