= Bonvi =

Italian comic book artist (1941–1995)

- Born: Franco Bonvicini; 31 March 1941 Modena, Italy
- Died: 10 December 1995 (aged 54) Bologna, Italy
- Area: Cartoonist
- Pseudonym: Bonvi
- Notable works: Sturmtruppen, Nick Carter

Bonvi, pen name of Franco Bonvicini (31 March 1941 – 10 December 1995), was an Italian comic book artist, who created the comic strips Sturmtruppen and Nick Carter.

== Biography ==
Bonvicini was born either in Parma or in Modena, in the Emilia-Romagna region of Northern Italy. The correct site is unknown, as his mother registered him in both places to obtain twice the amount of war-rationing food stamps. The author hinted at this fact in one of his Sturmtruppen comic books, where he usually hid autobiographical notes inside the dark humour of the books.

Sturmtruppen is the most popular among Bonvi's many creations.

After a brief experience in advertising work, he made his debut in the comics world in 1968 for the newspaper Paese Sera with his most famous strip Sturmtruppen. Sturmtruppen was later translated in numerous countries outside Italy. While politically left-aligned and a pacifist, Bonvi was fascinated by war, and had served in the tank corps in postwar Italy. He also had an encyclopedic knowledge of the Wehrmacht's uniforms, weapons and equipment, which he faithfully recreated in his cartoonish universe. Each weapon and vehicle appearing in the strip is real; uniforms are also faithfully depicted apart from some simplifications. Sturmtruppen, however, was not only a satire of military life and Nazism, but also a true, endless wellspring of comical and surreal situations.

Sturmtruppen strips were published periodically until Bonvi's death, with the exception of a pause in the 1970s, in which he left Italy for a long trip to Africa. In 1967 he played Derek Flit, a parody of Derek Flint in How We Stole the Atomic Bomb an Italian spy comedy movie shot in Egypt.

Bonvicini was a friend of another famous Bolognese citizen, the writer and singer Francesco Guccini. As a duo, they produced a science fiction series called Storie dello spazio profondo (Stories from Deep Space) (1972), whose main protagonist has Bonvi's features. In 1969 he also created Cattivik, another surreal strip parodying the anti-hero Diabolik. The series was to be continued with success by his pupil Guido Silvestri, better known as Silver and, later, by other cartoonists. Bonvi's second-best known character was created in 1971, in collaboration with writer and TV director Guido De Maria: Nick Carter, a refreshing humour series featuring a trio of detectives (series' namesake Nick Carter aided by massive and naive Patsy and proverb-quoting chinaman Ten) working in the New York of 1910s. Nick Carter appeared also in TV in the 1970s.

In this decade Bonvi created an adult science fiction series, Cronache del dopobomba ("After the Bomb Chronicles"), featuring a grotesque post-apocalyptic world, as well as the fictional detective Milo Marat (for the French market, with Mario Gomboli), and his most serious comic book, L'uomo di Tsushima ("The Man of Tsushima"). For the latter's protagonist Bonvi used again his face as that of the US author Jack London, one of his favourite writers. In 1973 Bonvicini was named Best European Cartoonist receiving the Prix Saint-Michel.

Another famous work were the adventures of Marzolino Tarantola, an eccentric millionaire engaged along with his butler and the hulking speech-impaired strongman "Henry the crew" in a car race across the world, from San Francisco to Paris; the threesome must constantly fend off the dastardly tricks of their nemesis, "Professor Moriarty" and his diminutive lackey, Perfidio. The story is loosely based on the Wacky Races cartoon and the movie The Great Race with Tony Curtis and Jack Lemmon but both inspirations merely served Bonvi as a pretext to let him draw wild capers across the globe in the early-1900s which were his preferred time period.

In the 1980s Bonvi became a member of Bologna town hall council and founded a publishing house with Italian deejay and TV personality Red Ronnie. They published a monthly magazine featuring new Sturmtruppen strips and reprints of old Bonvi stories, as well as articles about music, teen culture and comics in general.

Bonvi's last work was Zona X, in collaboration with Giorgio Cavazzano. It was published posthumously by Sergio Bonelli Editore in 1996 with the new title La città.

== Death ==
Bonvi was killed in a car accident in 1995. He was on his way to a TV station in Bologna to appear on Red Ronnie's TV show to raise financial support for cartoonist Magnus (Roberto Raviola) who was ill and in dire straits. Bonvi was struck by a Citroën Pallas while crossing a road right after having entered a bar asking for directions.

== Works ==
- Sturmtruppen (1968)
- Cattivik (1968)
- Capitan Posapiano (1969)
- Storie dello spazio profondo (1969), with Francesco Guccini
- Nick Carter (1972), with Guido De Maria
- Cronache del dopobomba (1974)
- L'Uomo di Tsushima (1978)
- Marzolino Tarantola (1979)
- Truppen Italien (1995), a Sturmtruppen version in collaboration with the Italian Army
- Blob (1993, published in ''Comix')

== Cinema ==
Bonvi co-wrote the screenplay for the 1976 Sturmtruppen movie adaptation of Sturmtruppen, directed by Salvatore Samperi. He also appeared briefly in the second film of the series, Sturmtruppen II (1982), playing a German officer. He also starred in the 1967 Come rubammo la bomba atomica, directed by Lucio Fulci, and in the movie Cavalli si nasce (1989), directed by the comic strip author Sergio Staino.
