= Amanda Lear filmography =

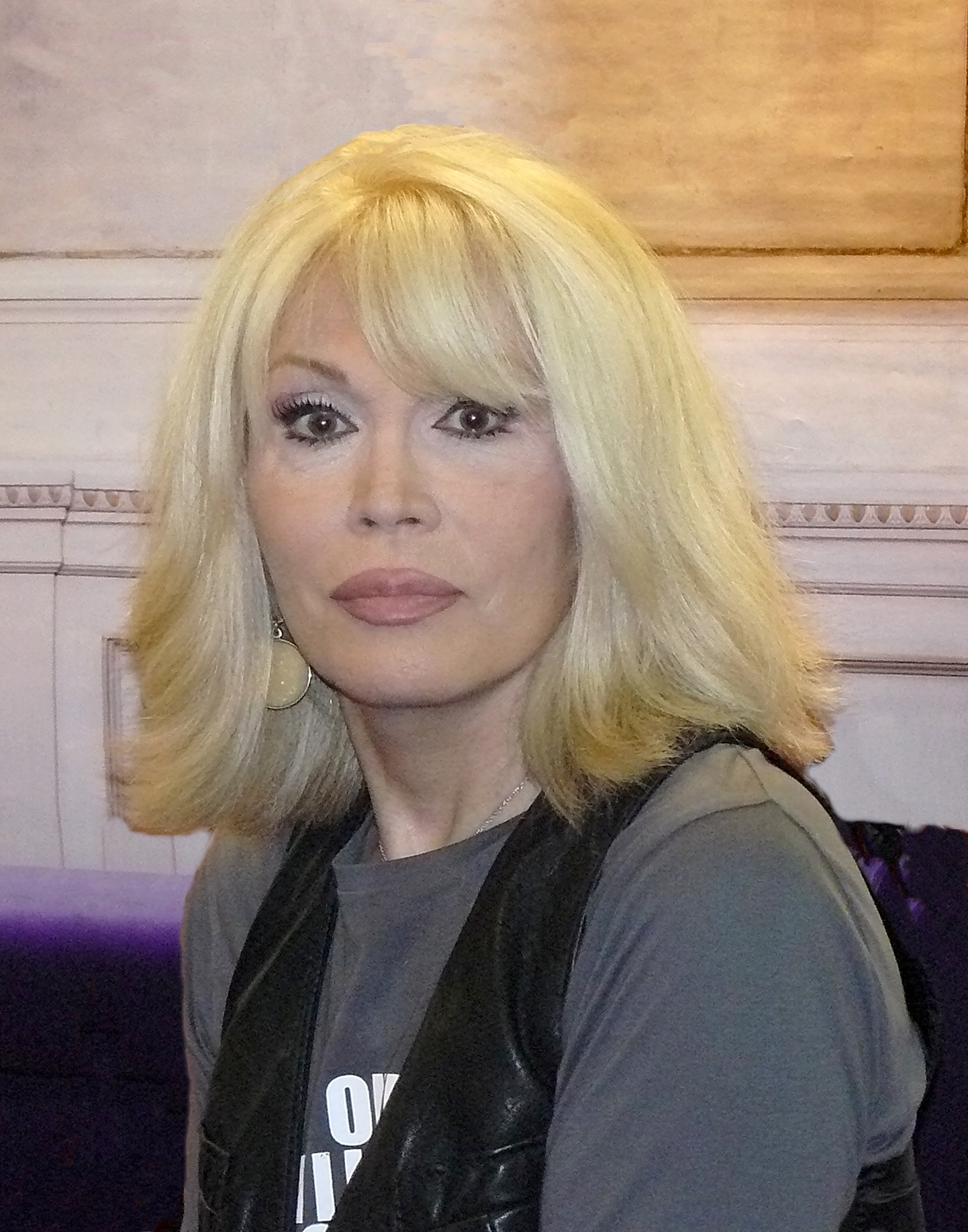
Amanda Lear in 2010

Amanda Lear is a French singer, lyricist, painter, television presenter, actress and former model. She began her professional career as a fashion model in the mid-1960s. Around that time she met the Spanish surrealist painter Salvador Dalí and would remain his closest friend and muse for the next 15 years. From the mid-1970s to the early 1980s, she was a million-album-selling disco queen, mainly in Continental Europe and Scandinavia, signed to Ariola Records. Her best-selling album is Sweet Revenge and her biggest hits include "Blood and Honey", "Tomorrow", "Queen of Chinatown", "Follow Me", "Enigma (Give a Bit of Mmh to Me)", "The Sphinx" and "Fashion Pack".

By the mid-1980s, Lear had positioned herself as one of the leading media personalities in Italy, thanks to media tycoon Silvio Berlusconi, who offered her hosting the prime time entertainment show Premiatissima on the newly launched Canale 5. She then went on to host the popular show W le donne in Italy, adapted in France as Cherchez la femme, and Ars Amanda on the national Italian network RAI. Since the 1990s, her time has been divided between music, television, movies and painting. Despite regular album releases, she failed to achieve major success in charts with her music. However, her television career has remained stellar and she has hosted numerous successful TV shows, mostly in Italy and France, such as Il brutto anatroccolo and Cocktail d'amore. Lear has occasionally made guest appearances in French and Italian TV series. She has also performed acting and dubbing roles in independent as well as major film productions.

== TV shows ==
Year	Title	Channel	Role
1973	The 1980 Floor Show	NBC, USA	Performer
1978	Stryx	Rai 2, Italy	Performer
1980	Mostra internazionale di musica leggera	Rai 1, Italy	Hostess
1981	Supersonica	Telemontecarlo, Italy	Hostess, performer
1981–1982	Grey Street	Telemontecarlo, Italy	Hostess, performer
1982–1984	Premiatissima	Canale 5, Italy	Hostess, performer
1983	Ma chi è Amanda?	Canale 5, Italy	Hostess
1984–1986	W le donne	Canale 5, Italy	Hostess, performer
1985	Miss Italia	Canale 5, Italy	Hostess
1986	Cherchez la femme	La Cinq, France	Hostess, performer
1989	Ars Amanda	Rai 3, Italy	Hostess
1991–1992	Buonasera	Rete 4, Italy	Hostess
1992–2014	Les Grosses Têtes	TF1, France	Participant
1993–1994	Méfiez-vous des blondes	TF1, France	Hostess
1995–1996	Peep!	RTL 2, Germany	Hostess, performer
1996	La notte dei teleratti	Rai 3, Italy	Hostess
1998–2000	Il brutto anatroccolo	Italia 1, Italy	Hostess
1998–1999	Ciao Darwin	Canale 5, Italy	Judge
1998–1999	Buon capodanno	Canale 5, Italy	Hostess
2002–2003	Cocktail d'amore	Rai 2, Italy	Hostess
2002	Tendance	Match TV, France	Hostess
2003	La grande notte	Rai 2, Italy	Hostess
2004	La talpa (episode 1 only)	Rai 2, Italy	Hostess
2005–2007	Ballando con le stelle (seasons 1, 2 and 4)	Rai 2, Italy	Judge
2008	La folle histoire du disco	France 3, France	Hostess
2008	The Singing Office	SKY Vivo, Italy	Judge
2008	Sfida tra sexy star a Hollywood	E!, Italy	Hostess
2008	Summer of the 70s	Arte, France	Hostess
2011	Ciak... si canta! (season 3)	Rai 1, Italy	Judge
2014–2015	Si può fare!	Rai 1, Italy	Judge
2018	Voulez-vous coucher avec moi?	Cielo, Italy	Hostess
2019	Sanremo Young	Rai 1, Italy	Judge
2023	Drag Race France (season 2)	France.tv Slash, France	Judge

== TV series ==
Year	Title	Role	Channel
1969	Der Kommissar	Model	ZDF, West Germany
1988	Marc et Sophie	Astrologer	TF1, France
1989	Maguy		Antenne 2, France
1992	Piazza di Spagna	Herself	Canale 5, Italy
1996	L'@mour est à réinventer	Neighbour	Arte, France
1998	Les Années bleues	Mathilde	TF1, France
2000	Blague à part	Herself	Canal+, France
2001	Un gars, une fille	Herself	France 2, France
2004	Sous le soleil	Sonia Rio	TF1, France
2008	Avocats et Associés	Herself	France 2, France
2008	Un posto al sole	Death	Rai 3, Italy
2012	Scènes de ménages	Marion's aunt	M6, France
2014	Nos chers voisins	Armella	TF1, France
2021	Camping Paradis	Marie-Hélène	TF1, France
2021	Hashtag Boomer	Herself	OCS, France
2023	Escort Boys	Amanda	Amazon Prime
2024	La Maison	Marwa Jallab	Apple TV+

== Feature films ==
Year	Title	Role
1968	Ne jouez pas avec les Martiens	
1968	Fun and Games for Everyone	
1970	Double Pisces, Scorpio Rising	
1978	Follie di notte (Crazy Nights)	Herself
1978	Loggerheads (Zio Adolfo in arte Führer)	Singer
1985	Grottenolm	Dr. Ludmilla Nerovna
1993	Une Femme pour moi (TV film)	Françoise
1998	Bimboland	Gina
2002	Le Défi (Dance Challenge)	Birgit
2006	Starfuckers	Herself
2007	Un Amour de fantôme (TV film)	Elizabeth
2007	Oliviero Rising	Antonietta
2008	Bloody Flowers	Charlotte de Saint-Martin
2008	8th Wonderland	TV presenter
2009	Panique au ministère (TV film)	Cécile
2011	Le Grand Restaurant II (TV film)	Agathe
2012	Nom de code: Rose (TV film)	Manoue
2013	Jodorowsky's Dune	Herself
2017	Metti una notte	Lulù
2020	Si muore solo da vivi	Giusy Ganaglia
2020	Miss	Marraine
2022	Queen Lear (TV film)	Herself
2023	Maison de retraite 2	Barbie
2024	To Live, To Die, To Live Again	Leolia

== Short films ==
Year	Title	Role
2005	Gigolo	Woman
2005	Memorias de Arkaran	
2008	Encore une nuit de merde dans cette ville pourrie	Barmaid

== Dubbing ==
Year	Title	Role
2004	The Incredibles (Les Indestructibles, Gli Incredibili)	Edna Mode (in the French and Italian versions)
2008	Dragon Hunters (Chasseurs de dragons)	Gildas (in the French version)
2009	Lacoma	Fish
2011	Zookeeper	Janet the Lioness (in the French version)
2018	Incredibles 2 (Les Indestructibles 2, Gli Incredibili 2)	Edna Mode (in the French and Italian versions)
