= Le Silence de la mer (disambiguation) =

Le Silence de la mer is a French novella.

Le Silence de la mer may also refer to:

- Le Silence de la mer (1949 film)
- Le Silence de la Mer (2004 film)
