= D'Argens =

D'Argens may refer to:

- Jean-Baptiste de Boyer, Marquis d'Argens (1704-1771), French philosopher
- Alain-Philippe Malagnac d'Argens de Villèle (1950-2000), French aristocrat
