= Logan's Run (TV series) =

- Gregory Harrison as Logan 5, Heather Menzies as Jessica 6, and Donald Moffat as Rem
- Genre: Science fiction
- Created by: based on characters created by William F. Nolan, George Clayton Johnson, & David Zelag Goodman
- Starring: Gregory Harrison; Heather Menzies; Donald Moffat; Randy Powell
- Music by: Laurence Rosenthal (theme, pilot and 3 episodes); Jerrold Immel; Bruce Broughton; Jeff Alexander
- Country of origin: United States
- Original language: English
- No. of seasons: 1
- No. of episodes: 14

Production
- Executive producers: Ivan Goff; Ben Roberts
- Running time: 60 minutes
- Production companies: Goff-Roberts-Steiner Productions; MGM Television

Original release
- Network: CBS
- Release: September 16, 1977 – February 6, 1978

Logan's Run is an American science fiction television series, a spin-off from the 1976 film of the same title. The series starred Gregory Harrison as Logan 5 (the title character), Heather Menzies as Jessica 6, and Randy Powell as Francis 7. This series was aired on CBS from September 16, 1977, to February 6, 1978.

The series maintains the basic premise and visual style of the film in that Logan and Jessica have escaped from the "City of Domes" so that they will not have to die upon reaching the age of 30. The series differs from the plot of the movie in various ways, and depicts Logan and Jessica on the run in each episode in various locations on future Earth as they search for the mythical place known as "Sanctuary". Logan and Jessica are also assisted in each episode by an android called REM (acronym for Reclective – meaning self-programming, problem-solving – Entity Mobile), a character created for the series and played by Donald Moffat.

The series lasted only 14 episodes before it was cancelled due to low ratings.

== Plot ==
The series depicted Logan and Jessica escaping from the City of Domes only to be pursued by Francis (Randolph Powell) and various other Sandmen. Traveling in the "SolarCraft," a futuristic hovercraft-like vehicle which they find in an abandoned building in the remains of Washington, D.C., they embark on a trek through the post-apocalyptic United States to find Sanctuary. On their journey, they encounter strange human societies, robots and aliens. The domed city (including Carrousel)(sic) was seen only in the pilot and two other episodes, using recycled footage from the film. In a change from the book and film, the television series had the city secretly run by a cabal of older citizens who promised Francis a life beyond the age of 30 as a city elder if he can capture the fugitives. Logan and Jessica were joined on their journey by an android named Rem (played by Donald Moffat), whom they encounter in a futuristic city run by robots.

== Cast ==
- Gregory Harrison as Logan 5
- Heather Menzies as Jessica 6
- Donald Moffat as Rem, an android whose technological skill and tools often help the runners
- Randolph Powell as Francis 7

== Production ==
=== Writing ===
D. C. Fontana served as story editor and worked alongside several other writers from Star Trek as well as one of the original novel's authors. Executive producers were Ivan Goff and Ben Roberts, who had created Charlie's Angels the year before.

The pilot episode, which began with a condensed retelling of the original film's concept was written by William F. Nolan, co-author of the original novel, with Saul David, the original producer of the film and the TV series (until he was dismissed), and series producer Leonard Katzman. When the pilot was presented to the network, CBS asked to have part of the pilot re-shot with changes to the plot, including the introduction of a cabal of city elders who secretly ruled over the Domed city. This change alters Francis 7's motivations for pursuing Logan. In the film, his intent is to kill Logan for betrayal, but due to the introduction of the cabal, Francis is offered by them the chance to live beyond age 30 as a reward for bringing Logan and Jessica back to the city.

Goff and Roberts were brought on board by MGM when original producer of the TV show (and producer of the film) Saul David was fired from the project and the pilot episode went through reshoots, rewriting and re-editing prior to being green-lit for production as a series. The line producer for the series was Leonard Katzman.

Fontana commissioned Harlan Ellison to write a treatment for one episode ("Crypt" which was heavily revised) and David Gerrold to write a teleplay ("Man Out of Time"). Gerrold's script was rewritten by someone else, prompting Gerrold to use his pen name "Noah Ward" (a homonym of "no award") on the episode.

=== Casting ===
In a 2017 interview, Heather Menzies stated that Dirk Benedict and her Sound of Music co-star Nicholas Hammond also auditioned for the role of Logan 5. When asked for her opinion on the series' quick demise, she replied: "I think they needed to spend more money on the visuals. Star Wars came out around that time and we couldn't really compete with that".

=== Music ===
The series' main theme was composed by Laurence Rosenthal. Most of the incidental music was also by Rosenthal. Some additional music was composed by Bruce Broughton, and Jerrold Immel.

== Episodes ==
No.	Title	Directed by	Written by	Original release date
1	"Logan's Run"	Robert Day	William F. Nolan, Saul David and Leonard Katzman	September 16, 1977
75-minute pilot episode: In the 23rd century, survivors of a nuclear war live in a domed city where they are allowed to stay alive only until age 30. "Runners", who refuse to die in the extermination ceremony known as Carousel, are hunted down and killed by enforcers called Sandmen. Logan is a Sandman who's begun to question the system, and he and a woman named Jessica leave the city to seek a mysterious place called Sanctuary, pursued by a trio of Sandmen led by Francis. While exploring the ruins of Washington, D.C., Jessica and Logan discover a solar-powered hovercraft, and use it to flee the Sandmen. They find a colony of people living in an ancient fallout shelter, where they find an older man who knows something about the war and once met another runner. The colony is harassed by horse-mounted "riders" armed with laser rifles, but manage to storm the rider's base with Logan's help. Jessica and Logan then move on and find their car guided by a remote-controlling beacon to the entrance of a "Mountain City" whose inhabitants are ignorant of wars, runners, other cities, or even the concept of death, and greet them with advanced technological comforts. The city has no children, and is run by "masters" who turn out to be the skeletal remains of humans; its current inhabitants are revealed to be robots who will serve human visitors but do not allow them to leave. Logan and Jessica manage to escape and are joined by Rem, a more advanced "android" who works at repairing other robots but who has always wanted to escape to the outer world, as the Sandmen are captured by the city's robots.
2	"The Collectors"	Alexander Singer	James Schmerer	September 23, 1977
Logan and Jessica are abducted by John the Protector and Joanna, aliens from another planet who are manipulating their minds, making them believe that they have found Sanctuary. But they are not alone in their captivity. Trivia: This was a reunion of actresses Angela Cartwright and Heather Menzies. They both starred in The Sound of Music as sisters, Brigitta and Louisa von Trapp, respectively. Note: Randy Powell does not appear in this episode
3	"Capture"	Irving J. Moore	Michael Richards	September 30, 1977
After stopping by a river, Logan's group is briefly recaptured by the Sandman who have escaped from the Mountain City and found their own, smaller solar car. It is revealed that Rem is programmed not to harm humans, but is nevertheless clever enough to turn the tables on their captors without direct violence. A hunter named James Borden (Horst Buchholz) and his wife Irene (Mary Woronov) capture the Runners and Francis. Logan's crew and the Sandmen must cooperate to escape.
4	"The Innocent"	Michael Preece	Story by : Ray Brenner; Teleplay by : Ray Brenner and D. C. Fontana	October 10, 1977
Logan, Jessica and Rem encounter a young woman named Lisa Lisa Eilbacher, whose parents left her alone with two robots for company. Lisa has a crush on Logan and plans to get rid of Jessica so she can have him for herself. More teams of Sandmen join the chase and Lisa threatens to turn Logan over to them, but relents and frees his group.
5	"Man Out of Time"	Nicholas Colasanto	Noah Ward (David Gerrold)	October 17, 1977
Scientist David Eakins time-travels 200 years into the future, where he encounters Logan, Jessica and Rem. He then plans to change history and prevent the nuclear war, but in the process he could erase the existence of the Runners' world. Note: Randy Powell does not appear in this episode.
6	"Half Life"	Steven Hilliard Stern	Shimon Wincelberg	October 31, 1977
Logan, Jessica and Rem are attacked by two bands of duplicate humans with vastly different temperaments: one group is kind and gentle while the other is violent and vicious. Jessica is captured and split into two different persons with completely opposite temperaments. A young Kim Cattrall plays the part of Ramma II Note: Randy Powell does not appear in this episode
7	"Crypt"	Michael Caffey	Story by : Harlan Ellison; Teleplay by : Al Hayes	November 7, 1977
The Runners find an underground room with six selected survivors of the nuclear holocaust, chosen to rebuild civilization, cryogenically preserved. They need a cure for a plague from the past, but there is not enough medicine for all of them. Note: Randy Powell does not appear in this episode
8	"Fear Factor"	Gerald Mayer	John Sherlock	November 14, 1977
The Runners are captured by scientists of an authoritarian, concealed city who plan to use Logan in their experiments to remove all human fears and to create a powerful army. Note: Randy Powell does not appear in this episode
9	"The Judas Goat"	Paul Krasny	John Meredyth Lucas	December 19, 1977
A Sandman is given plastic surgery to appear as the runner Hal 14 (Nicholas Hammond), one of Jessica's friends. He is sent on a covert mission to try to persuade Logan and Jessica to return to the City to supposedly help other Runners escape to the outside world. Trivia: This was a reunion of actors Nicholas Hammond and Heather Menzies. They both starred in The Sound of Music as brother and sister, Friedrich and Louisa von Trapp, respectively. Note: Randy Powell does not appear in this episode
10	"Futurepast"	Michael O'Herlihy	Katharyn Powers	January 2, 1978
Logan and Jessica are accidentally put to sleep by a dream analysis machine controlled by a female android named Ariana. Logan dreams he is back in the City of Domes being interrogated by the Sandmen about how he found Sanctuary. Jessica dreams she is being forced to take part in Carousel.
11	"Carousel"	Irving J. Moore	Story by : Richard L. Breen, Jr. Teleplay by : D. C. Fontana	January 16, 1978
Strangers shoot Logan with a dart containing a serum that erases his memory. Francis then takes him back to the City to testify against Sanctuary and to be terminated via Carousel. Jessica and Rem try to save Logan and retrieve his memory.
12	"Night Visitors"	Paul Krasny	Leonard Katzman	January 23, 1978
The Runners stop at a house haunted by spirits from another time. Jessica is captured so that one of the spirits can use her as the receptacle for his dead wife's spirit. Note: Randy Powell does not appear in this episode
13	"Turnabout"	Paul Krasny	Story by : Michael Michaelian; Teleplay by : Michael Michaelian and Al Hayes	January 30, 1978
The Runners are captured by backward desert dwellers and condemned to death. Francis attempts to rescue Logan and Jessica.
14	"Stargate"	Curtis Harrington	Dennis O'Neil	February 6, 1978
The Runners encounter aliens from a much hotter planet who need parts from Rem to bring others of their kind to Earth.

== Distribution and merchandising ==
Despite its brief run, the show was sold overseas. It was shown in the United Kingdom by the ITV network in early 1978, though times varied per region. It was also shown in Australia late 1977, in France in 1978, in Spain in 1982 (titled La fuga de Logan) and in Italy in 1984. It was also broadcast on Channel One in New Zealand. Known in Mexico as Fuga en el siglo XXIII, aired on the national networkTelevisa's XHGC-Canal 5, this series broadcast left a lasting impression on a generation of mexican viewers.

The Mego Corporation had planned to release a line of Logan's Run toys in conjunction with the series. Prototypes were made for several 10-inch (25 cm) action figures, but the cancellation of the show prompted Mego to change their minds and cancel production.

== Home media ==
The complete run of the series was released by Warner Home Video on Region 1 DVD on April 10, 2012.
