= Chloé Jouannet =

French actress (born 1997)

- Born: 17 October 1997 (age 28)
- Citizenship: France; Switzerland
- Occupation: Actress
- Years active: 2009–present
- Notable work: My Summer in Provence; Street Flow; Infidèle
- Parents: Thomas Jouannet (father); Alexandra Lamy (mother)
- Relatives: Audrey Lamy (aunt); François Lamy (first cousin once removed); Jean Dujardin (former stepfather); Armelle Deutsch (stepmother)

Chloé Jouannet (born 17 October 1997) is a French-Swiss actress.

== Biography ==
Jouannet is the daughter of actors Thomas Jouannet and Alexandra Lamy.

She made her first appearance in cinema at the age of 12 in a small role in the film Lucky Luke, where she acted alongside her mother and step-father, Jean Dujardin, but it was due to her role in the dramatic comedy My Summer in Provence, directed by Rose Bosch, that she came to prominence, where she played a rebellious teenager along with Jean Reno and Anna Galiena.

=== Personal life ===
In 2016, she officially confirmed her relationship with the actor Zacharie Chasseriaud. The relationship ended in 2020, when she started dating Sandor Funtek.

She lived in London with her mother between 2013 and 2018.

== Filmography ==
=== Film ===
- 2009: Lucky Luke (directed by James Huth) Eleanor
- 2014: My Summer in Provence (directed by Rose Bosch) Léa
- 2018: Le Gendre de ma vie (directed by François Desagnat) Raphaëlle, one of Stéphane's daughters
- 2019: Street Flow (directed by Kery James and Leïla Sy) Lisa
- 2026: Let's Love (directed by Jamie Adams) TBA

=== TV ===
- 2017-2019: Riviera (directed by Philipp Kadelbach) (series)
- Since 2019: Infidèle (created by Didier Le Pêcheur) (series)
- 2019: Jamais sans toi, Louna (directed by Yann Samuell) (TV film)

=== Theatre ===
- 2018: The Vagina Monologues (directed by Eve Ensler), at the Comédia.
