= List of 2016 box office number-one films in France =

The following is a list of 2016 box office number-one films in France. Variety proclaimed that in 2016, France’s 2016 total box office was "the second-best in the last 50 years" and that after combining admissions for all films of any nationality, the total box office came in at 213 million, up 3.6% on 2015 and only bettered by 2011’s 217 million. The most popular films at the French box office were That Hollywood animation and action films and the latest new films in contemporary French comedy franchises.

== Number-one films ==
†	This implies the highest-grossing movie of the year.

#	Date	Film	Gross	Notes
1	3 January 2016	Star Wars: The Force Awakens	US$12.22 million	
2	6 January 2016	Star Wars: The Force Awakens	US$5.01 million	
3	13 January 2016	Creed	US$3.96 million	
4	20 January 2016	The 5th Wave	US$2.63 million	
6	3 February 2016	Les Tuche 2	US$8.38 million	
7	10 February 2016	Deadpool	US$9.45 million	
8	17 February 2016	Zootopia †	US$8.13 million	
9	24 February 2016	The Revenant	US$7.91 million	
11	9 March 2016	The Divergent Series: Allegiant	US$2.78 million	
14	30 March 2016	Kung Fu Panda 3	US$4.13 million	
15	6 April 2016	The Visitors: Bastille Day	US$6.97 million	
16	13 April 2016	The Jungle Book	US$8.00 million	
18	27 April 2016	Captain America: Civil War	US$9.41 million	
19	4 May 2016	Captain America: Civil War	US$5.22 million	
20	11 May 2016	Captain America: Civil War	US$2.68 million	
21	11 May 2016	X-Men: Apocalypse	US$6.23 million	
22	25 May 2016	Warcraft	US$4.36 million	
23	1 June 2016	Back to Mom's	US$4.13 million	
24	8 June 2016	Back to Mom's	US$2.46 million	
25	15 June 2016	Back to Mom's	US$2.04 million	
26	22 June 2016	Finding Dory	US$4.66 million	
27	29 June 2016	Camping 3	US$8.31 million	
28	6 July 2016	Camping 3	US$2.66 million	
29	13 July 2016	Ice Age: Collision Course	US$7.07 million	
30	20 July 2016	Independence Day: Resurgence	US$4.46 million	
31	27 July 2016	The Secret Life of Pets	US$5.85 million	
32	3 August 2016	Suicide Squad	US$7.9 million	
34	17 August 2016	The Secret Life of Pets	US$2.47 million	
35	24 August 2016	Lights Out	US$1.6 million	
36	31 August 2016	Mechanic: Resurrection	US$1.26 million	
37	7 September 2016	Ben-Hur	US$1.30 million	
38	14 September 2016	In Bed with Victoria	US$1.61 million	
39	21 September 2016	It's Only the End of the World	US$2.44 million	
40	28 September 2016	Radin!	US$6.62 million	
41	5 October 2016	Miss Peregrine's Home for Peculiar Children	US$5.31 million	
42	12 October 2016	Miss Peregrine's Home for Peculiar Children	US$3.38 million	
43	19 October 2016	Brice 3	US$6.21 million	
44	26 October 2016	Doctor Strange	US$5.8 million	
45	2 November 2016	La folle histoire de Max et Léon	US$3.82 million	
46	9 November 2016	Inferno	US$3.13 million	
47	16 November 2016	Fantastic Beasts and Where to Find Them	US$9.05 million	
48	23 November 2016	Fantastic Beasts and Where to Find Them	US$5.43 million	
49	30 November 2016	Moana	US$5.55 million	
50	7 December 2016	Moana	US$4.56 million	
51	14 December 2016	Rogue One: A Star Wars Story	US$9.94 million	
52	21 December 2016	Rogue One: A Star Wars Story	US$5.86 million	
53	28 December 2016	Rogue One: A Star Wars Story	US$6.22 million	
