= Rolling to You =

2018 French comedy film

- French: Tout le monde debout
- Directed by: Franck Dubosc
- Written by: Franck Dubosc; Declan May
- Produced by: Sidonie Dumas
- Starring: Franck Dubosc; Alexandra Lamy
- Cinematography: Ludovic Colbeau-Justin
- Edited by: Samuel Danési
- Music by: Sylvain Goldberg; Emilien Levistre; Xiaoxi Levistre
- Production company: Gaumont
- Distributed by: Gaumont; La Boétie Films; Pour Toi Public Productions; TF1 Films Production; Nexus Factory; Umedia
- Release date: 14 March 2018
- Running time: 107 minutes
- Countries: France; Belgium
- Languages: French; English; Italian
- Budget: $10.8 million
- Box office: $22.4 million

Rolling to You (French: Tout le monde debout, lit. 'Everyone standing') is a 2018 French comedy film directed by Franck Dubosc.

== Cast ==
- Franck Dubosc as Jocelyn
- Alexandra Lamy as Florence
- Elsa Zylberstein as Marie
- Gérard Darmon as Max
- Caroline Anglade as Julie
- Laurent Bateau as Lucien
- Claude Brasseur as Jocelyn's father
- François-Xavier Demaison as The priest

== Accolades ==
Year	Award	Category	Recipient	Result
2019	Globe de Cristal Awards	Best Film - Comedy	Franck Dubosc	Nominated
2019	Globe de Cristal Awards	Best Actress - Comedy	Alexandra Lamy	Won
