= Le Silence de la mer =

1942 French novel

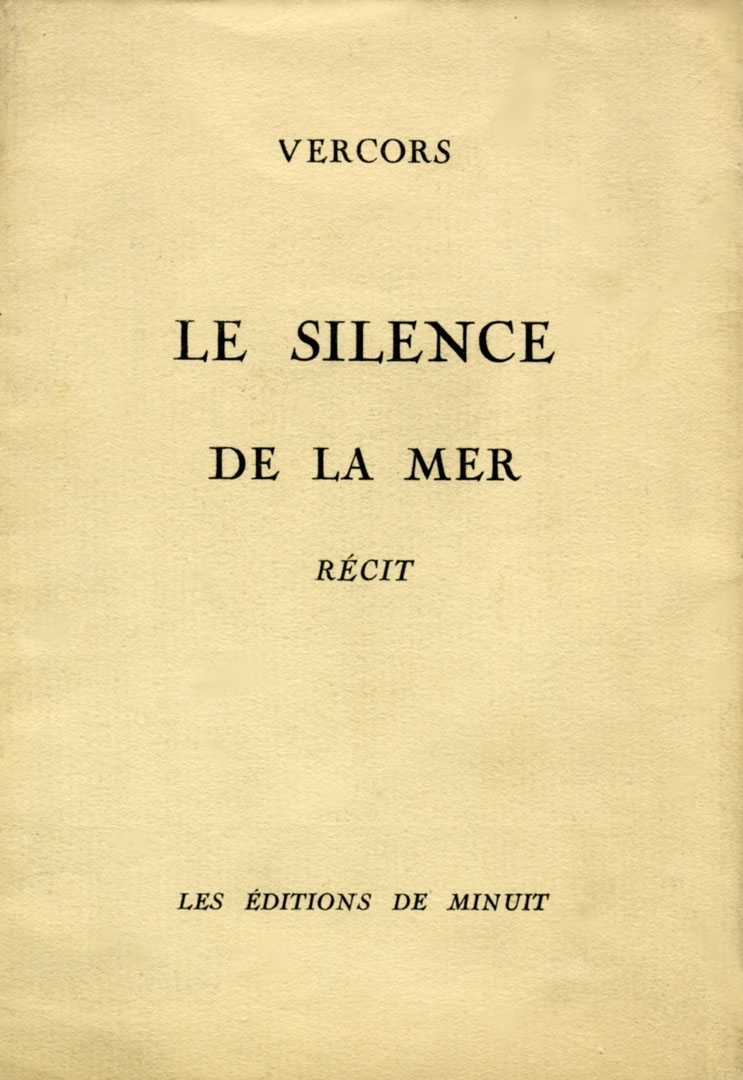
- Cover of the first edition
- Author: Vercors
- Translator: Cyril Connolly
- Language: French
- Genre: War novel
- Publisher: Les Éditions de Minuit
- Publication date: 1942
- Publication place: France
- English publication date: 1944
- Media type: Print
- Pages: 90

Le Silence de la mer (French: [lə silɑ̃s də la mɛʁ]), English titles Silence of the Sea and Put Out the Light, is a French novella written in 1941 by Jean Bruller under the pseudonym "Vercors". Published secretly in German-occupied Paris in 1942, the book quickly became a symbol of mental resistance against German occupiers.

== Plot summary ==
In the book, Vercors tells of how an old man and his niece show resistance against the German occupiers by not speaking to the officer who is occupying their house (modelled on the German author and soldier Ernst Jünger). The German officer is a former composer, dreaming of brotherhood between the French and German nations, deluded by the Nazi propaganda of that period. He is disillusioned when he realizes the real goal of the German army is not to build but to ruin and to exploit. He then chooses to leave France to fight on the Eastern Front, cryptically declaring he is "off to Hell".

== English translation ==
The book was translated into English by Cyril Connolly and published in 1944 under the title Put Out the Light. Connolly's translation was reprinted in a bilingual edition in 1991 titled Silence of the Sea.

== Adaptations ==
An English-language adaptation called The Silence of the Sea was transmitted by the BBC TV service on 7 June 1946 as part of their first evening's programming following the resumption of TV broadcasting after the end of World War II.

A French-language film directed by Jean-Pierre Melville, Le Silence de la mer, was released in 1949.

A 1980 audio adaptation was directed by Bijan Mofid, starring Bijan Mofid as André, Fahimeh Rastkar as Jeanne and Naser Tahmasb as Werner von Ebrennac.

A second English-language TV adaptation was broadcast by the BBC in 1981, and a stage version by John Crowther was performed by The Heywood Society in the theatre at Peterhouse, Cambridge, in 1985, under the title Talking in the Night.

Le Silence de la Mer, a French–Belgian TV adaptation, was directed by Pierre Boutron and screened in 2004.

In 2013, a new English version by Anthony Weigh was staged at the Trafalgar Studios theatre in London as part of the Donmar Trafalgar season, starring Leo Bill, Simona Bitmate, and Finbar Lynch. Simon Evans directed.

== See also ==
- Underground media in German-occupied Europe
- Code Name Melville
- French Resistance
- Le Monde's 100 Books of the Century
- Les Éditions de Minuit
- Suite Française, another novel with a German composer/officer character quartered in a French home during World War II.
- Vichy France
