= Randolph Powell =

American actor (born 1950)

- Born: Randolph Powell; April 14, 1950 (age 76); Iowa City, Iowa, U.S.
- Other name: "Randy"
- Years active: 1965–2008
- Spouse: Jacqueline Epps. 1981–present
- Children: Daughter and son, Alana Powell, Kai Powell

Randolph Powell (born April 14, 1950) is an American actor, best known for his roles on television. He was a leading cast member of the science fiction series Logan's Run, also being known for the role of Alan Beam in the soap opera Dallas.

== Life and career ==
Born in Iowa City, Iowa, Powell was raised in nearby Mason City, Iowa. As a youth, Powell acted in plays in junior high as well as high school before landing the role of Tommy Djilas in a production of "The Music Man" in 1968 at age 17 at the Mason City Community Theatre.

After graduating from high school im Mason City, Powell attended the University of Denver, where he was in the theater program. After doing summer stock on Cape Cod and in Illinois, he embarked on his professional acting career, heading for Hollywood in 1974.

In addition to his recurring roles on Logan's Run and the original Dallas TV series, Powell has also made guest appearances on Laverne and Shirley, Harry O, Eight is Enough, Barnaby Jones, Fantasy Island, and T.J. Hooker. His film credits include Doctors' Private Lives (1978), Battletruck (1982) and National Lampoon's Class Reunion (1982). He also appeared in 1981's The Incredible Shrinking Woman. Powell played Tyler Malone on "Days of Our Lives" from 1983 to 1984.

In 2005, he returned to Mason City to help spearhead the conversion of a former sporting goods store into Mason City Community Theater’s new facility, serving as honorary chairman for the fund-raising campaign to convert the former Decker Sporting Goods building into the now present MCCT facility.

== Family life ==
Powell has been married to the former Jacqueline Epps since 1981; they have two now adult children, Alana and Kai. He and his wife reside in Santa Monica, California.
