= Les Animaux dénaturés =

1952 novel by Jean Bruller

- First Edition
- Author: Jean Bruller
- Language: French
- Publication date: 1952

Les animaux dénaturés is a 1952 novel by Jean Bruller under his pseudonym Vercors. English-language editions appeared under the titles You Shall Know Them, The Murder of the Missing Link, and Borderline. The author adapted it into a play, Zoo ou l'Assassin philanthrope. The novel was adapted into the motion picture Skullduggery (1970), starring Burt Reynolds and Susan Clark.

== Plot ==
Anthropologists travel to New Guinea to search for the so-called missing link of human evolution. What they find is not a fossil, but an actual population of ape-like creatures, called Paranthropus greamiensis after the discoverer, and dubbed Tropis.

Vancruysen, a businessman, has the idea to use them as a cheap workforce without rights or pay. The scientists then realize they must come up with a definitive answer to the problem of whether or not the Tropis are human, something they have avoided doing on the grounds that fixing an arbitrary limit between human and non-human is akin to the sorites paradox.

They try to use the criterion of interfertility, but it appears that Tropi females can be impregnated by sperm from both man and ape, making it impossible to decide before the offspring reach reproductive age.

To force the authorities to reach a decision, thus giving legal protection of the Tropis whether as animals or citizens, one of the scientists deliberately kills the baby born from one Tropi female impregnated by his own sperm. The trial will then determine whether he committed murder (making the Tropis human) or simply killed an animal.

== Reception ==
Groff Conklin, reviewing the first American edition, found the novel "uniquely original. ... shocking and fascinating, and the moral and ethical implications tremendous". P. Schuyler Miller received the novel favorably, noting that it handled its theme "more quietly, less emotionally [and] less melodramatically" than familiar genre treatments of the subject. The Calgary Herald declared it "the best novel of 1953" and described it as "a fine, ironic commentary on our affairs". Time magazine found it to be a "pungent" satire, '"more supple than subtle", but faulted its "halfhearted love story" and concluded it was "more a polemic than a novel".
