= My Life with Dalí =

Book by Amanda Lear

- Author: Amanda Lear
- Original title: Le Dalí d'Amanda
- Language: French
- Genre: autobiography
- Publisher: Pierre-Marcel Favre
- Publication date: 1984

My Life with Dalí is an autobiography by French singer Amanda Lear, first released in 1984, which tells about her relationship with Spanish surrealist painter Salvador Dalí. The book, which had Dalí's full approval, gave detailed insights into the lives of both the artist and his muse.

== Background ==
The book was originally published in French in 1984 as Le Dalí d'Amanda. It has since been translated into no less than six languages and released in Europe, Asia and the USA. The first English language edition was released by Virgin Books as My Life with Dalí in the UK in 1985. In 2004, an updated and expanded edition was released in France, entitled Mon Dalí. The book was dedicated to "Gala, the patient, loving wife".

The narration starts in London in autumn 1965 and introduces Lear as a fine art student, living in Chelsea's Sloane Avenue. Her first meeting with Dalí took place around that time in Le Castel, a famous Parisian restaurant and nightclub, and gave the beginning to an over-15-year-long friendship. Lear became the painter's muse and closest friend, although, as she herself repeatedly stressed, their relationship never was intimate. She also refers to her relations with the likes of Brian Jones, Tara Browne and David Bowie, as well as mentioning Anita Pallenberg, Keith Richards, Pablo Picasso, Brigitte Bardot and other notable cultural figures of the 1960s and 1970s.

Lear describes how she accompanied Dalí and his wife on trips to Barcelona, Madrid, New York and Paris over a period of some fifteen years. She also spent every summer with Dalí at his home at Port Lligat, near Cadaqués in Catalonia. Lear posed for some of Dalí's works, took part in several of his film projects and could be seen by his side during press conferences and meetings with the media. These media events, characteristically for the age of flower power and this stage of Dalí's artistic career, often turned into happenings as spectacular as the art itself, frequently with Lear as the central figure. With the Dalís, Lear also regularly socialised with celebrities and European royalty such as Prince Rainier and Princess Grace of Monaco. Dalí served as a mentor to Lear, their travels allowing her to discover the great museums of Europe, Parisian salons and restaurants, New York bohemia and his homeland, Spain, with a special regard to Catalan culture. In return, she introduced him to the younger generation of the counterculture in art, fashion, photography and music in London.

Plans have been made to produce a biographical film based on the content of the book. Jeremy Irons was considered to play the part of Dalí while Claudia Schiffer was a candidate for the role of Amanda. Lear revealed in a 2001 interview that Schiffer, having read the book, sarcastically said to her upon their meeting: "Amanda, I really like your book. Who wrote it for you?" Lear says she replied with irony: "I'm glad you liked it. Who read it to you?". The film was never produced.

The film/TV rights for My Life with Dali is currently under contract with A.E.Synenko (Gamine Films: Producer/Screenwriter)

== Release history ==
| Year | Region | Title | Publisher |
|---|---|---|---|
| 1984 | France | Le Dalí d'Amanda | Pierre-Marcel Favre |
| 1984 | Germany | Dalí: 15 Jahre mit Salvador Dalí | Goldmann |
| 1985 | Spain | El Dalí de Amanda | Planeta |
| July 1985 | United Kingdom | My Life with Dalí | Virgin Books |
| February 1987 | United States | Persistence of Memory: A Personal Biography of Salvador Dalí | National Press Books |
| 1987 | Italy | La mia vita con Dalí | Costa & Nolan |
| June 1989 | Germany | Dalí: 15 Jahre mit Salvador Dalí | Goldmann |
| 1994 | France | L'Amant Dalí: Ma vie avec Salvador Dalí | Michel Lafon |
| September 1994 | Mexico | La persistencia de la memoria. Una biografía personal de Salvador Dalí | Diana |
| August 1995 | United Kingdom | The Persistence of Memory: A Biography of Dalí | Da Capo Press |
| April 2004 | France | Mon Dalí | Michel Lafon |
| 2005 | Russia | Dalí глазами Аманды | КоЛибри |
