= Thomas Jouannet =

Swiss actor

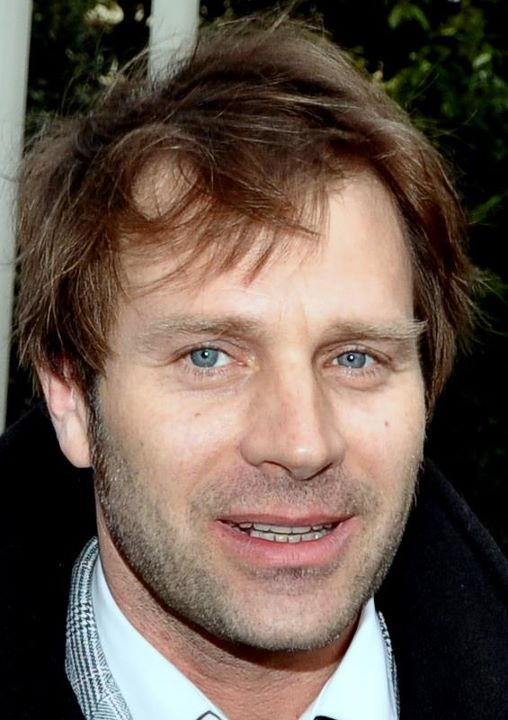
- Jouannet in February 2012
- Born: 30 September 1970 (age 55); Geneva, Switzerland
- Occupation: Actor
- Years active: 1993—
- Spouse: Armelle Deutsch (m. 2010)
- Partner: Alexandra Lamy (1995–2003)
- Children: 3, including Chloé Jouannet

Thomas Jouannet (born 30 September 1970) is a Swiss–French actor.

== Early life, family and education ==
Jouannet started in a theatre class in Geneva. He relocated to Paris and was trained by Jean Périmony.

== Career ==
He began performing in several French TV series and TV movies, such as The Dominici Case and Le Silence de la Mer. He also appeared as Antoine in Clara Sheller.

In 2009, he played Don Pedro in La Reine morte which is an adaptation of the play by Henry de Montherlant.

== Honors, awards and nominations ==
Jouannet was nominated in the Best Actor category at the Menton International Fantasy Film Festival 2022 for the role Charles Lasset in the series Prometheus (shown on TF1).

== Personal life ==
He was in a relationship with actress Alexandra Lamy from 1995 to 2003; they have a daughter, Chloé, born in October 1997.

He married actress Armelle Deutsch in 2010, with whom he has two children.

== Selected filmography ==
Television

Year	Title	Role	Notes
2001	Joséphine, ange gardien	Yves	TV series (1 episode: La Comédie du bonheur)
2003	L'adieu	Laurent Luissac	2 parts, leading role
2003	Aurélien	Edmond de Barbentane	2 parts
2003	The Dominici Case	Lukas Fabre	2 parts
2004	Le Silence de la Mer	Werner Von Ebrennac	co-lead
2005	À la poursuite de l'amour	Zac	aka Chasing love
2005	Élodie Bradford	Sébastien Fondant	Ep 3
2006	Beau masque	Philippe Letourneau	second film adaptation
2007	Clara Sheller	Antoine	Season 2, Ep 3–6
2009	La Dame de Monsoreau	Bussy d'Amboise	2 parts
2009	The Dead Queen	Don Pedro	historical
2009	Double enquête	Comissaire Vincent Gaillard	
2009	Les châtaigniers du désert	Brice Le Guillou	2 parts
2010	L'ombre du Mont-Saint-Michel	Romain Fresnoy	
2010	Vivace	Alex Charpentier	co-lead
2012	Des soucis et des homme	David	8 parts
2013	Enquêtes réservées	Arthur Morgane	Season 5, Ep 3–6
2015	Meurtres à Collioure	Marc Messac	TV movie
2015–2017	Nina	Dr. Costa Antonakis	Seasons 1–3, 28 episodes
2015, 2017	Contact	Thomas Adam	Seasons 1–2, 8 episodes
2019	Soupçons	Sammuel	

Film

Year	Title	Role	Notes
2004	Tout pour l'oseille	Frédéric	aka All for the money
2006	Henry Dunant: Red on the Cross	Henry Dunant	Leading role, biographical
2012	La banda Picasso	Henri-Pierre Roché	
2012	Cloclo	Alain-Dominique Perrin	

Short film

Year	Title	Role	Notes
2003	Visite guidée	Paul Moreau	co-executive producer, role opposite Alexandra Lamy
2003	Façade		
2011	Yukiko	The Surgeon	Co-lead. Best Short Film (the 7th POM - Toronto)
