= Michael St. Clair =

Australian actor and writer

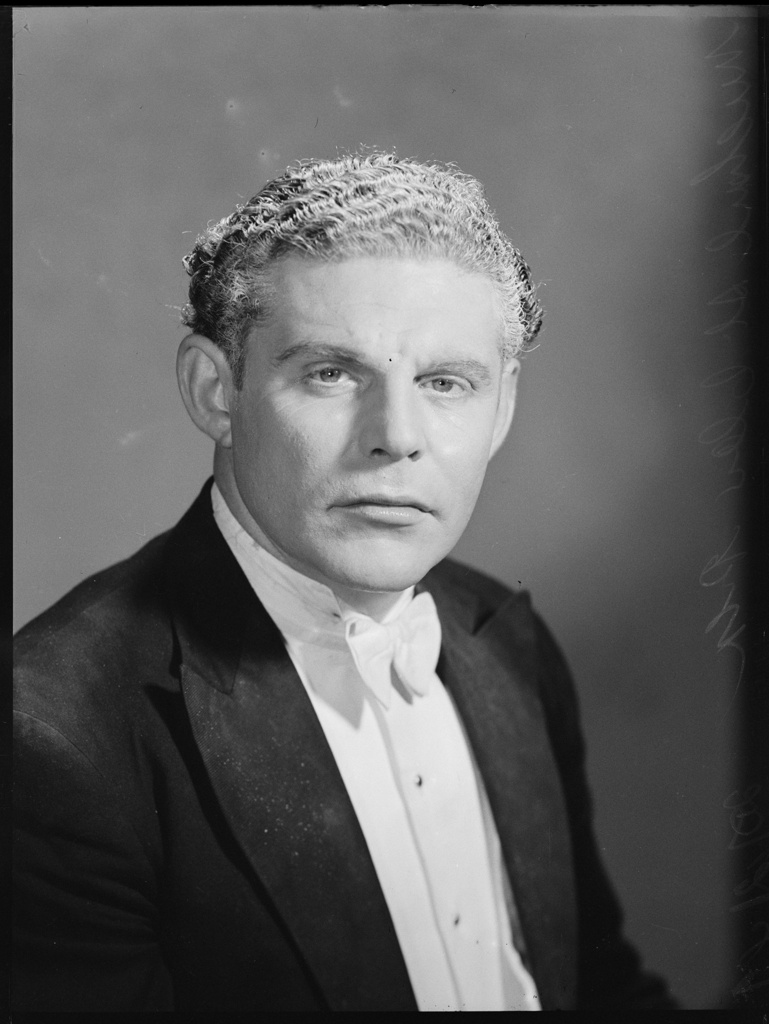
Michael St Clair, ventriloquist & impersonator 1949

Michael St. Clair (1922–2001) was an Australian actor and writer who worked in Hollywood.

== Life and career ==
St. Clair served in the Australian Army during World War II, was a professional boxer, and worked as a ventriloquist in Australia. He appeared on various radio and television shows in Australia during the 1950s, such as Children's TV Club and the Captain Fortune Show. He moved to the United States in the late 1950s to work on the Playboy Club circuit.

His acting career began in the 1960s. He appeared on television in episodes of shows such as The Rockford Files, 77 Sunset Strip, Mission: Impossible, Hogan's Heroes, and Get Smart. By 1974 he estimated he had appeared in over 40 movies and 100 television shows.

== Selected film credits ==
- The Notorious Landlady (1962)
- Our Man Flint (1965)
- Von Ryan's Express (1965).
- The King's Pirate (1967)
- Thoroughly Modern Millie (1967)
- Skullduggery (1970)
- A Reflection of Fear (1972)
- Americathon (1979)

== Screenwriting credits ==
- Mission Mars (1968)
- The Body Stealers (1969)
