= Le Silence de la Mer (2004 film) =

2004 French–Belgian film

- Original title: Le Silence de la mer
- Based on: Le Silence de la mer by Vercors
- Screenplay by: Anne Giafferi
- Directed by: Pierre Boutron
- Starring: Thomas Jouannet; Julie Delarme; Michel Galabru
- Music by: Jean-Claude Nachon; Angélique Nachon
- Countries of origin: France; Belgium
- Original languages: French; German

Production
- Producers: Alain Bordiec; Catherine Ruault
- Cinematography: Alain Levent
- Editor: Patrice Monnet
- Running time: 93 min
- Production companies: Expand Drama; RTBF; Saga Film; TV5; France 2; La Chaine Festival

Original release
- Network: France 2
- Release: 24 October 2004
- Network: RTBF
- Release: 25 October 2004

Le Silence de la mer (lit. 'The silence of the sea') is a 2004 French-Belgian TV drama film directed by Pierre Boutron, based on the 1942 book of the same name by Jean Bruller (published clandestinely under the pen name "Vercors"), and starring Thomas Jouannet, Julie Delarme and Michel Galabru. The story takes place in 1941 during World War II, and concerns the relationship of a Frenchman and his granddaughter with a German captain who occupies their house during the German occupation of France.

== Plot ==
In 1941 France, during the Nazi occupation of the country, Werner von Ebrennac, a German Wehrmacht captain, requisitions the house of a man and his granddaughter, Jeanne Larosière, a young piano teacher, as his lodging. The officer, passionate about French culture, speaks perfect French and is also a classical pianist and composer. Every evening he shares his ideals and his passion for France with his hosts, who oppose him with a fierce and unshakable silence, the only way for them to mark their hostility to the German occupation. Jeanne tries to ignore Werner, but she soon falls in love with the German officer.

== Cast ==
- Thomas Jouannet as Captain Werner von Ebrennac
- Julie Delarme as Jeanne Larosière
- Michel Galabru as André Larosière
- Marie Bunel as Marie
- Timothée Ferrand as Pierre
- Jean-Baptiste Puech as Pascal
- Jörg Schnass as le premier officier
- Jörn Cambreleng as le second officier
- Franck Beckmann as l'ordonnance du capitaine Werner Von Ebrennac
- Alexander Ashkenazy as François
- Hélène Vauquois as la mère de François
- Lucie Barret as Solange
- Jean Philippe Mesmain as le père de Solange
- Claude Andrzejewski as Louis

== Awards ==
- 2004 Saint-Tropez Fiction TV Festival: Best TV Film, Best Actress (Julie Delarme) and Best Music
