= My Summer in Provence =

2014 film

- Theatrical release poster
- Directed by: Rose Bosch
- Starring: Jean Reno; Anna Galiena
- Release date: 2 April 2014
- Running time: 105 minutes
- Country: France
- Language: French

My Summer in Provence (French: Avis de mistral) is a 2014 French drama film directed by Rose Bosch.

== Cast ==
- Jean Reno - Paul Mazuret
- Anna Galiena - Irène
- Chloé Jouannet - Léa
- Hugo Dessioux - Adrien
- Aure Atika - Magali
- Lukas Pélissier - Théo
- Tom Leeb - Tiago
- Hugues Aufray - Elie
- Charlotte de Turckheim - Laurette
