= Von Ryan's Express =

1965 film by Mark Robson

- Theatrical release poster by Tom Chantrell
- Directed by: Mark Robson
- Screenplay by: Wendell Mayes; Joseph Landon
- Based on: Von Ryan's Express; 1964 novel by David Westheimer
- Produced by: Saul David
- Starring: Frank Sinatra; Trevor Howard; Raffaella Carrà; Brad Dexter; Sergio Fantoni; John Leyton; Edward Mulhare; Wolfgang Preiss
- Cinematography: William H. Daniels
- Edited by: Dorothy Spencer
- Music by: Jerry Goldsmith
- Distributed by: 20th Century Fox
- Release date: June 23, 1965
- Running time: 117 minutes
- Country: United States
- Language: English/Italian/German
- Budget: $5.76 million
- Box office: $17.1 million

Von Ryan's Express is a 1965 World War II adventure film starring Frank Sinatra, Trevor Howard, and Raffaella Carrà, and directed by Mark Robson. Produced by 20th Century Fox and shot in CinemaScope, the film depicts a group of Allied prisoners of war (POWs) who attempt a daring escape by hijacking a freight train carrying Allied POWs, and then taking the train through German-occupied Italy towards neutral Switzerland. Based on the 1964 novel by David Westheimer, the film changes several aspects of the novel, most notably the ending, which is considerably more upbeat in the book. Financially, it became one of Sinatra's most successful films.

== Plot ==
In 1943 Colonel Joseph Ryan, a USAAF fighter pilot, is shot down over Italy and taken to a POW camp run by the Fascist camp commander, Major Basilio Battaglia, and his sympathetic second-in-command, Captain Vittorio Oriani. Most prisoners are from the British 9th Fusiliers whose commanding officer recently died after being placed in a "sweat box" as punishment for hitting Battaglia. Ryan becomes the most senior Allied officer in the camp, and automatically assumes command of the POWs, replacing Major Eric Fincham, the senior British officer.

Friction develops between Ryan and Fincham. Ryan declines to support Fincham's escape attempts because Italy is close to surrender. He orders Fincham to distribute Red Cross medical supplies to the seriously ill prisoners after American prisoners are caught stealing medicine from a secret British hoard, and he reveals an escape plan to Battaglia in exchange for better treatment of the prisoners.

When Battaglia refuses to issue new clothing, Ryan orders prisoners to strip and burn their filthy uniforms. Battaglia throws Ryan into the sweat box as punishment. After Italy surrenders, the camp guards flee. Ryan is freed and discovers the British are putting Battaglia on trial as a war criminal. Ryan steps in to save Battaglia from execution, instead sentencing him to his own sweat box.

A German fighter plane overflies the camp, forcing the POWs to flee into the Italian countryside. Captain Oriani agrees to make contact with Allied forces on their behalf but the Germans recapture the prisoners and force them into train boxcars. Fincham assumes Oriani betrayed them until he is found severely beaten on board. The freed Battaglia comes to gloat at their misfortune. Before leaving, the Germans shoot all the sick prisoners. Fincham blames Ryan for letting Battaglia live, and derogatively calls him "von Ryan".

Major von Klemment, takes command of the prisoner transport. As the train heads toward northern Italy, Ryan, Fincham, and Lieutenant Orde escape their car and free some POWs, who kill the remaining guards and take their uniforms as a disguise. Ryan and Fincham find von Klemment and his Italian mistress, Gabriella, in the command car. Von Klemment reveals a German troop train is on the same schedule and he is expected to stop in Florence to receive new orders. To get through the station, German-speaking British chaplain, Captain Costanzo, impersonates the German commander with Fincham and Ryan dressed as German soldiers. The orders show that both trains are headed to Innsbruck, Austria. Using a forged typewritten order, the prisoners switch their train onto a different line at Bologna while the troop train continues toward Innsbruck. Ryan, still dressed as a German soldier, is forced to shoot Von Klemment and Gabriella after they escape from the train. Her death disgusts the Italian civilians who see Ryan as a Nazi.

The German High Command discovers the train has been diverted, while the train is caught in an Allied bombing raid, killing three prisoners and wounding sixty. Oriani and the train's Italian engineer tell Ryan and Fincham their only option is to reroute the train at Milan to neutral Switzerland. However, SS troops have set up an ambush. The prisoners capture a signal box and reroute the train.

In the Italian Alps just before the Swiss border, rockets from a German aircraft topple boulders onto the track. SS troops in another train catch up as the prisoners clear and repair the track. Ryan and Fincham lead a group of POWs in holding them off until the train can move again. Ryan is killed as Fincham and the surviving POWs departs for the safety of Switzerland.

== Cast ==
- Frank Sinatra as Col. Joseph L. Ryan
- Trevor Howard as Maj. Eric Fincham
- Raffaella Carrà as Gabriella
- Brad Dexter as Sgt. Bostick
- Sergio Fantoni as Capt. Oriani
- John Leyton as Lt. Orde
- Edward Mulhare as Capt. Costanzo, the chaplain
- Wolfgang Preiss as Maj. von Klemment
- James Brolin as Private Ames
- John van Dreelen as Col. Gortz
- Adolfo Celi as Maj. Bassilio Battaglia
- Vito Scotti as Peppino the Italian engineer
- Richard Bakalyan as Cpl. Giannini
- Michael Goodliffe as Capt. Stein
- Michael St. Clair as Sgt. Dunbar
- Ivan Triesault as Obergruppenfuhrer Wilhelm von Kleist

== Production ==
=== Original novel ===
The novel was published in 1963. The novelist David Westheimer had been a POW during World War II. He witnessed the bombing of Bolzano in 1943 from a box car. Martin Levin, reviewing the book for The New York Times, said the novel "has everything for the screen but the camera directions."

=== Development ===
The novel was a best seller and 20th Century Fox bought the film rights for a reported $125,000. The studio assigned Saul David to produce and Mark Robson to direct. Robson had intended to make The Centurians, but this was delayed when his chosen star, Anthony Quinn, was unavailable. Frank Sinatra had read the novel and wanted to buy the film rights himself; when he heard they had been lost to Fox, he offered his services for the lead role.

Von Ryan's Express was a project keenly undertaken by 20th Century Fox, which was still financially reeling after the extravagance and critical bashing of Cleopatra. Fox, in a bid to prove that it was still able to make films on an epic scale, shot extensively on location in Europe and built a full-scale prison camp as opposed to shooting on a backlot. It was producer Saul David's first film for Fox. He followed it with Our Man Flint, Fantastic Voyage, and In Like Flint.

=== Filming ===
Rumors of a personality clash between star Frank Sinatra, who was flown by helicopter to the set, and director Mark Robson were not enough to cause problems as the film was shot with relatively little trouble. However, Sinatra did insist that the ending of the film be altered, ending any chance of a sequel. Sinatra also insisted the film be shot in Panavision rather than Fox's CinemaScope.

The film score was written by Jerry Goldsmith.

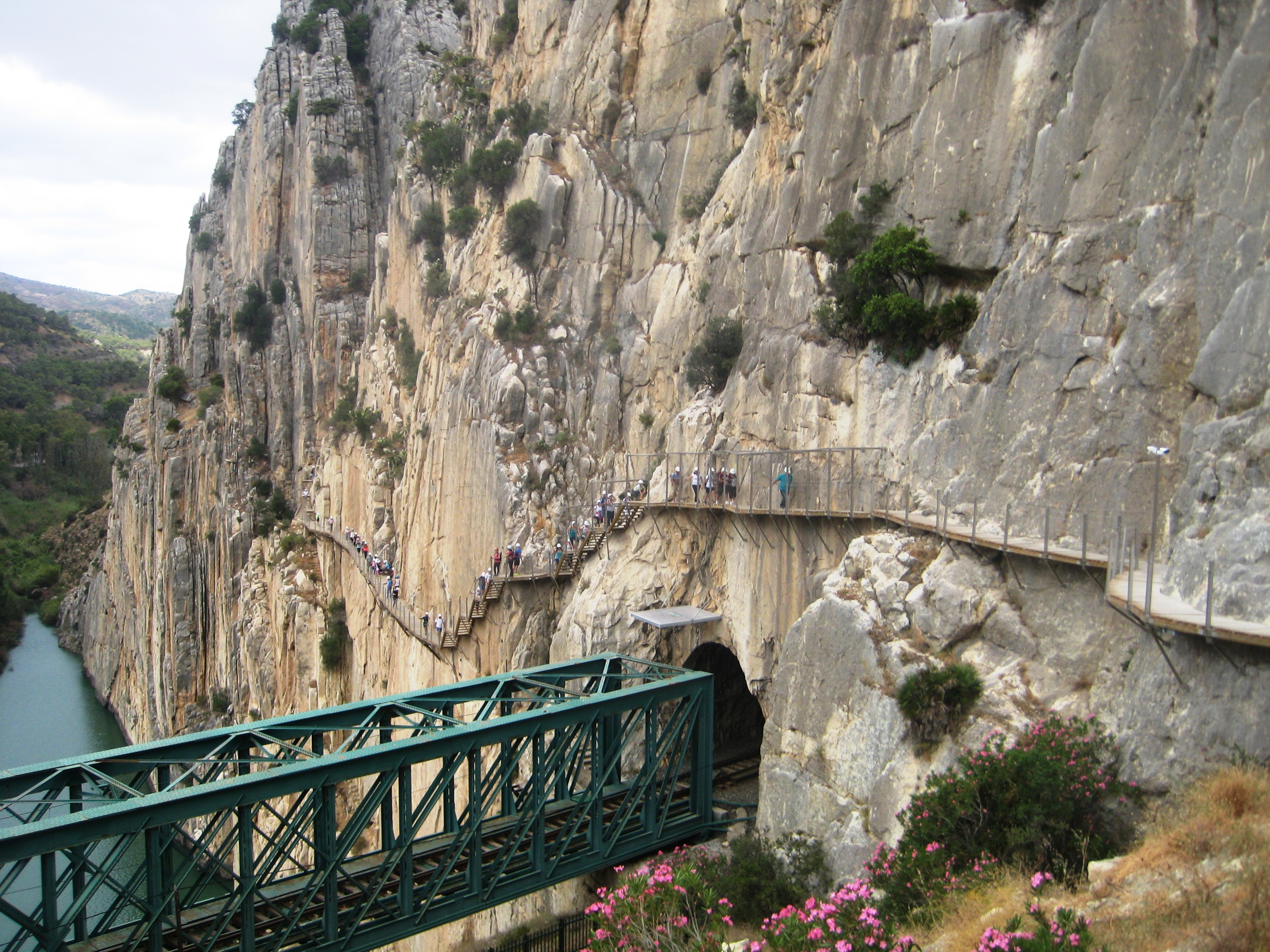
The railway bridge in 2015.

Von Ryan's Express achieved verisimilitude using aircraft, trains, and wheeled vehicles photographed on location along with the occasional model. The aircraft alluded to as Messerschmitts were indeed Messerschmitt Bf 108s. A majority of the film was shot on location around Northern Italy in Cortina d'Ampezzo and Firenze Santa Maria Novella railway station in Florence (in reality is Roma Ostiense railway station). The Ferrovie dello Stato/Italian State Railway closely cooperated on the production, as reflected in the film's closing acknowledgment credit, providing a complete train headed by the specially-bulled up FS Class 735.236. The train which the Nazis commandeer to pursue the escaping POWs is headed by a Franco-Crosti boiler-fitted Class 743.

The railway sequence at the film's conclusion, however, was shot in the Caminito del Rey walkway in the limestone gorge of El Chorro and in the adjacent railway bridge, near Málaga in Andalucía, Spain. This switch from filming in Italy was probably done as the bridge looked more suitably attractive for presenting the final set piece than anything that could be found on the Italian rail network. The train featuring in these sequences was laid on by the RENFE/Spanish National Railways and altered to resemble the Italy-based train. Interiors were completed at 20th Century Fox Studios in Los Angeles. The POW camp (Campo Concentramento Prigioneri di Guerra 202) was also built in the front lot of the Studios.

== Reception ==
=== Critical ===
Critics liked Von Ryan's Express. Variety noted, "Mark Robson has made realistic use of the actual Italian setting of the David Westheimer novel in garmenting his action in hard-hitting direction and sharply drawn performances." Frank Sinatra's daughter Nancy noted in her biography of her father that his performance fuelled speculation of another Academy Award nomination. Time Out London called the film a "ripping adventure" that was "directed with amused panache by Robson, and helped no end by a fine cast...", while the BBC's TV, film and radio listings magazine The Radio Times described it as "a rattlingly exciting Second World War escape adventure, with a well-cast Frank Sinatra..."

On the review aggregator website Rotten Tomatoes, 90% of 21 critics' reviews are positive.

=== Box office ===
The film grossed $17,111,111 ($174,815,205 in 2025 consumer dollars) at the North American box office, equating to $7,700,000 ($78,666,843 in 2025 consumer dollars) taken in box office rentals. Variety ranked Von Ryan's Express as the 10th-highest-grossing film of 1965. Additionally, this was Sinatra's highest-grossing and biggest-earning film of the decade.

According to Fox records, the film needed to earn $12,600,000 in rentals to break even and made over $17,000,000, meaning it made a profit.

=== Awards ===
The film was nominated for a Best Sound Editing (Walter Rossi) Academy Award in 1966, while the Motion Picture Sound Editors also nominated the film for Best Sound Editing in a Feature Film.

British Channel 4 ranked Von Ryan's Express number 89 on their list of 100 Greatest War Films, commenting, "A ripping yarn culminating in a wild train dash through [Italy], with director Mark Robson cranking up the tension and releasing it with some excellent action set-pieces." It has a 90% rating on Rotten Tomatoes from 20 reviews.

== See also ==
- List of American films of 1965
