= The Dark Web (docuseries) =

The Dark Web is a television documentary series produced by CNA. It is a social documentary, distributed by Mediacorp Pte Ltd. Individual episodes explore a diversity of crime genres, but all of which have been complicated with the involvement of technology. The series is based on real incidents like Operation Bayonet, Bulacan-based "sextortion" syndicate, and more.

The Dark Web features experts from several fields including cybersecurity and criminology. Those in relevant industries were also invited to discuss the intersection of crime and technology.

== Episodes ==
The Dark Web is a series of four standalone episodes, all of which were released simultaneously on Channel News Asia on 10 July 2019. They can be watched in any order. The series is an instance of technology situating itself within criminology. Recurring themes throughout The Dark Web include data privacy and anonymity. Each episode explores varying genres of crime committed against the backdrop of the dark web.

Episode	Synopsis
Episode 1: Queen of Sextortion	Sextortion syndicates target global victims through social media.
Episode 2: Wildlife Clickbait	Illegal wildlife trades thrive on social consumer marketplaces.
Episode 3: Black Market Boom	Digital black markets operate anonymously using software designed for press privacy and freedom.
Episode 4: The Candyman	Secret child pornography rings run rampant in secret, closed groups and private chats.

The Dark Web can be seen to demonstrate the double-edged sword that is social media usage. Every episode alludes to cyber crime being rife although the criminal mastermind gets apprehended.

== Talent credit ==
- Ericson Gangoso - Director, Graphics & Executive Producer
- Kelly Lin - Producer, Series Producer & Executive Producer
- Diana Dwika Jayanti - Line Producer & Fixer
- Tan Yan Ling - Assistant Producer
- Darrel Moh - Assistant Producer
- Santirta Martendano - Camera
- Elliot Sng - Camera
- Grayson Seah - Camera Assistant
- Sary Latief - Legal Research
- Kenny Giam - Production Manager
- Jordon Katherine See - Post Producer
- Sueanne Teo - Editor
- Siti Rahayu Binte Mohd Ruslan - Translations
- Ngoi Soon Ling - Commissioning Editor (for CNA)
- Nadira Kasmani - Assistant Producer (for CNA)
- Magda Lilia Chelly (Extra)
- Anonymous (History)

== Awards and accolades ==
In 2021, episode 4, “The Candyman”, of The Dark Web docuseries was awarded ‘Silver’ under the category of ‘Social Issues’ by New York Festivals TV & Film Awards.
