= Magda Lilia Chelly =

Cybersecurity expert (born 1983)

Dr Magda Lilia Chelly
- Magda Chelly
- Born: Magda Lilia Chelly; 1983 (age 42–43); Krakow, Poland
- Education: Master in Telecommunication Engineering; Ph.D.
- Occupation: Cybersecurity Professional
- Title: Cybersecurity Expert, and Public Speaker
- Awards: The IFSEC Global influencers in security and fire 2021
- Website: https://magda-on-cyber.com

Magda Lilia Chelly (born 1983) is a Polish-Tunisian cybersecurity expert and is amongst the first Tunisian women to be on the advisory board of BlackHat Asia Executive Committee. Born in Krakow, Poland, and educated in Tunisia and France, Chelly worked as an IT consultant, university lecturer, business leader, and cybersecurity professional.

In 2016, Chelly established her own cybersecurity start-up out of Singapore, Asia. She is the founding member of Women on Cyber, a non-profit diversity group. Chelly has a long history of involvement in diversity and inclusion activism as she launched the first Catch The Flag competition for girls in Singapore with the support of Cyber Security Agency of Singapore.

== Early life ==
Chelly was born in Krakow, a town in south Poland, in 1983. Following her father's advice on the importance of getting an engineering degree, Chelly completed a Degree and a Master in Telecommunication Engineering before moving to France. There, Chelly completed her PhD in the same field at Telecom SudParis, Évry, France.

== Career ==
Chelly worked with several organizations as cybersecurity advisor.

A notice first published in Singapore’s Government Gazette on 27 July 2026 listed Responsible Cyber Pte. Ltd. as being in provisional liquidation. It stated that director Magda Lilia Chelly had lodged a statutory declaration that the company could not continue its business because of its liabilities. Meetings of the company and its creditors were scheduled for 13 August 2026.https://www.sgpbusiness.com/get-pdf/eg/bec6b503-89a0-11f1-897b-f8bc1255ffa2

== Research ==
Chelly's research career started with working on Indoor Positioning within Telecom SudParis. She later on expanded her research in cybersecurity. Amongst her scientific papers are:

- New techniques for indoor positioning, combining deterministic and estimation methods
- Wifi hybridisation with pseudolites and repeaters for indoor positioning purposes
- Social Media and the impact on education: Social media and home education

She was one of the reviewers for Annals of telecommunications - annales des télécommunications volume 65, pages 129–131, by the publisher Springer in 2009.

== Books ==
Chelly is the co-author, with Hai Tran and Shamane Tan, of one book on computer security and is an author of a science fiction book:

- (2022) Building a Cyber Resilient Business (ISBN 978-1803246482)
- (2021) Light, Shadow, and Cyber: Vera's Cyber Adventures

== Media ==
Chelly was featured as a cybersecurity expert in The Dark Web Documentary on Channel News Asia.

== Filmography ==
Chelly appeared in Love Me, Original title: Aime-moi (2009); a short movie with Armelle Deutsch: Toute la mort devant soi (2009), Love Me (2009), Utopium: Song for an Artist (2008).

== Awards and recognition ==
Chelly received various awards, across her career, including the below:

- The IFSEC Global influencers in security and fire 2021

== See also ==
- Indoor positioning system
- Wi-Fi positioning system
- Social media in education
