= Jean-Baptiste Puech =

French actor

Jean-Baptiste Puech is a French actor. He graduated from the Maison des Conservatoires in 1998 and the Royal Scottish Academy of Music and Drama in 2000.

== Filmography ==
- 2019 Anna
- 2014 Les Gazelles
- 2009 Panique
- 2009 Quand vient la peur
- 2009 Le Repenti
- 2008 Entre deux eaux
- 2008 Do elephants pray?
- 2007 Two days in Paris
- 2006 La grande peur dans la montagne
- 2005 Les chevaliers du ciel ( Sky fighters )
- 2005 Les amants de la Dent Blanche
- 2004 Le silence de la mer
- 2003 Les passeurs
- 2003 Double zero
- 2002 Ce jour-la

== Court metrage films ==
- 2007 La Metier qui rentre
- 2005 L'auto
- 2004 J'ai peur, j'ai mal, je meurs
- 2003 Chacun son camp
- 2002 2+1
