= Armelle Deutsch =

French actress

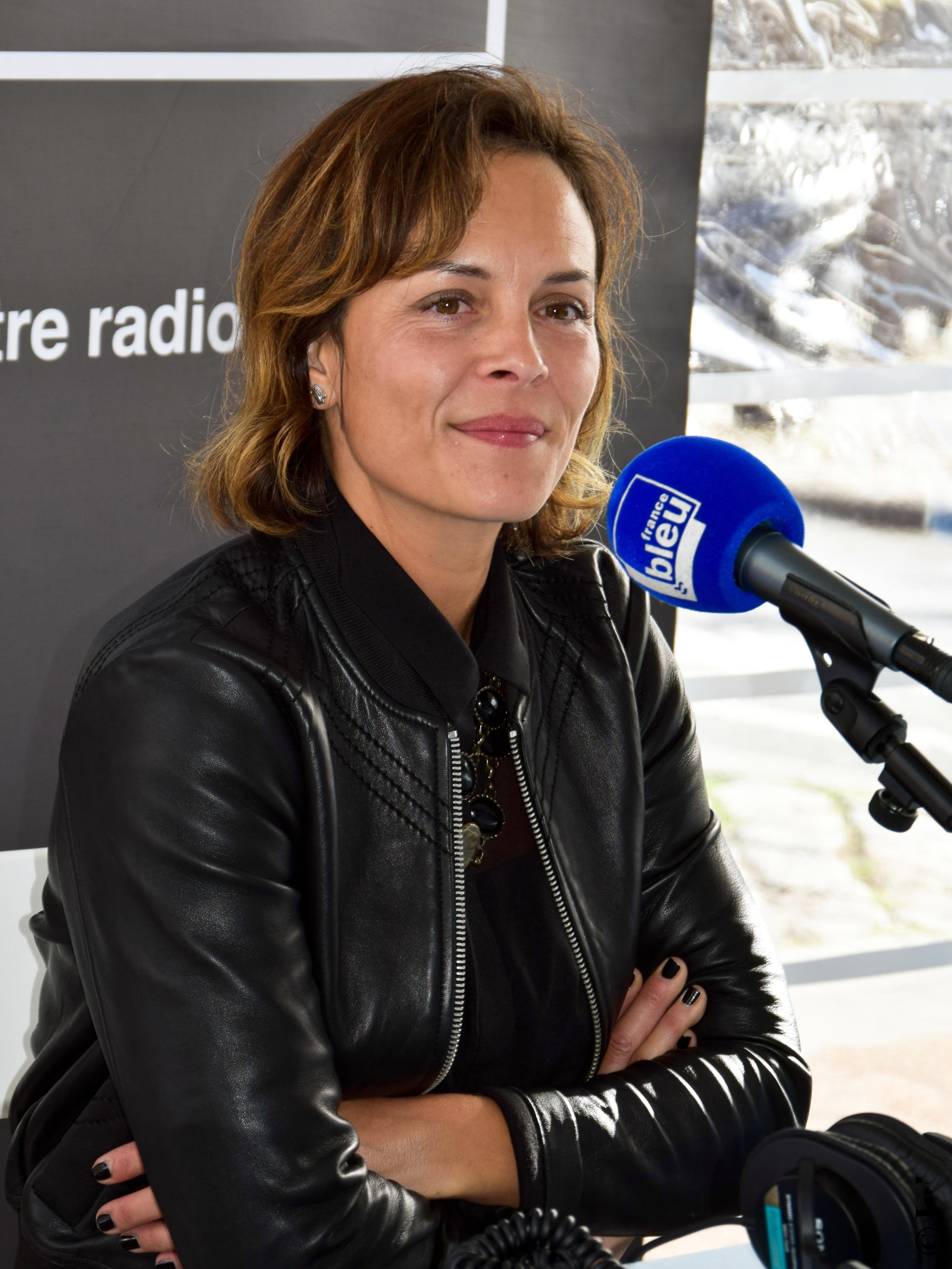
- Deutsch in 2016
- Born: 22 February 1979 (age 47); Martigues, France
- Occupation: Actress
- Years active: 2000–present
- Spouse: Thomas Jouannet (m. 2010)
- Children: 2
- Relatives: Chloé Jouannet (stepdaughter)

Armelle Deutsch (born 22 February 1979) is a French actress.

== Early life and career ==
Deutsch was born in the Bouches-du-Rhône. At the age of 13, Deutsch started acting classes and joined her first theatre group within Le Théâtre d'Astroméla. She then, plays a few plays, directed by Akel Akian in Marseille. At the age of 18, she decides to finish her acting training in Paris and enrolls at the famous Cours Florent. She then conducts the auditions in the hopes of landing a role on the big screen.

She made her first appearances in 2000 with a few small television roles - Vérité oblige, Navarro, One and one make six, Le Grand Patron. In the year 2001, she stood out in the role of Michèle Laroque's secretary in Francis Veber's successful comedy, Le Placard (2001). The same year, she played in the comedy La Boîte, directed by Claude Zidi.

One of her first appearances that made her known was in Francis Veber's comedy Le Placard, in which she plays Michèle Laroque. Following the success of the movie, Armelle increases her appearances and becomes a well-known actress in France. She has appeared in more than sixty films since 2000.

In 2003, she played a small role in the comedy-drama "Laisse tes mains sur mes hanches", directed by Chantal Lauby, and made an appearance in Francis Veber's new film, "Tais-toi !.

In 2004, she played roles in "Nos Amis les flics", by Bob Swaim, and "Le Carton", by Charles Nemes. She, then, lands a TV role in a detective series, playing Élodie Bradford, a French television series with 5 90 minutes- episodes, created by Lionel Bailliu and broadcast between October 20, 2004, and February 9, 2007, on M6. At the same time, she plays roles in comedies; in 2007, "Fracassés", by Franck Llopis, "La différence, c'est que c'est pas pareil", by Pascal Laëthier, and "Aime-Moi" (Short Film), by David Courtil.

== Personal life ==
Armelle met actor Thomas Jouannet, a Swiss actor on the set of the TV drama "L'Affaire Dominici" in 2003. On June 26, 2010, they got married. They have two kids and live in a quiet village in Loir-et-Cher.

== Selected filmography ==
Year	Title	Additional Crew	Genre	Note
2001	The Closet	Daniel Auteuil, Gérard Depardieu, Thierry Lhermitte, Michèle Laroque	Comedy	As Ariane
2010	Henri 4	Julien Boisselier, Joachim Król, Andreas Schmidt	Biography, Drama, War	As Margot
2011	La Chance de ma vie	Virginie Efira, François-Xavier Demaison	Comedy, Romance	As Sophie
2009–2017	Un village français	Robin Renucci, Audrey Fleurot, Thierry Godard, Marie Kremer	Drama	As Natacha
2009	Aime-moi	Olivier Sitruk, Jean-Claude Lecas, Khalid Maadour, Karina Testa, Extra: Magda Lilia Chelly	Comedy	A Short film by David Courtil, as Clarisse
2009	Barbie Girls	Marie Guillard, Vinciane Millereau	Horror	Short, 15mn
2015–	Elise's Secret	Bénabar, Julia Piaton, Stéphane Freiss, Sophie Mounicot	Drama, Fantasy, Mystery	
2007–	Ondes de choc	Aurélien Recoing, Alexandra Vandernoot, Jean-Yves Berteloot	Series	As Marion, Episode Rossi (2007), CléMent (2007), Samira (2007), François (2007), Marion (2007)
2013–	Mongeville	Francis Perrin, Pierre Aussedat, Jean-Philippe Lachaud, Gaëlle Bona	Crime, Drama	
2006–	Ce soir (ou jamais!)	Frédéric Taddeï, Emmanuel Todd, Guy Sorman, Michel Maffesoli	Talk-Show	
2013–	Candice Renoir	Cécile Bois, Raphaël Lenglet, Clara Antoons, Ali Marhyar	Comedy, Crime, Drama	
1997–2000	Un et un font six	Pierre Arditi, Brigitte Fossey, Vincent Lecoeur, Bérénice Bejo	Comedy	90mn
2003	Ruby & Quentin	Gérard Depardieu, Jean Reno, Richard Berry, André Dussollier	Comedy, Crime	
