= Skullduggery (1970 film) =

1970 adventure film by Gordon Douglas

- Film poster
- Directed by: Gordon Douglas
- Screenplay by: Nelson Gidding
- Based on: Les Animaux dénaturés by Vercors
- Produced by: Saul David
- Starring: Burt Reynolds; Susan Clark
- Cinematography: Robert C. Moreno; Vincent Saizis
- Edited by: John Woodcock
- Music by: Oliver Nelson
- Color process: Technicolor
- Production company: A Saul David Production
- Distributed by: Universal Pictures
- Release dates: March 6, 1970 (United States); March 11, 1970 (New York City)
- Running time: 105 minutes
- Country: United States
- Language: English
- Budget: $4,500,000

Skullduggery is a 1970 American adventure film directed by Gordon Douglas produced by Saul David and starring Burt Reynolds and Susan Clark. It is based on the French novel Les Animaux dénaturés (1952) (variously titled in English as You Shall Know Them, Borderline, and The Murder of the Missing Link) by Jean Bruller (writing under the pseudonym "Vercors").

== Plot ==
On an expedition in Papua New Guinea, the Tropis, a tribe of apelike creatures, are being used as slaves by humans. When one of the Tropis is allegedly murdered, the following murder trial centers on the question of whether the Tropis are human or animal.

== Cast ==
- Burt Reynolds as Douglas Temple
- Susan Clark as Dr. Sybil Greame
- Roger C. Carmel as Otto Kreps
- Paul Hubschmid as Vancruysen
- Chips Rafferty as Father "Pop" Dillingham
- Alexander Knox as Buffington
- Pat Suzuki as Topazia
- Edward Fox as Bruce Spofford
- Wilfrid Hyde-White as Eaton
- William Marshall as Attorney General
- Rhys Williams as Judge Draper
- Mort Marshall as Dr. Figgins
- Michael St. Clair as Tee Hee Lawrence
- Booker Bradshaw as Smoot
- John Kimberley as Epstain
- James Henry Eldridge as District Officer
- Totty Ames as Motel Manager
- James Bacon as Commentator
- Gilbert Senior as Kauni
- Clarence Harris as Siria
- Burnal Smith as Chief (as Burnal "Custus" Smith)
- John Woodcock as Spigget
- Newt Arnold as Inspector Mimms (as Newton D. Arnold)
- Wendell Baggett as Reverend Holzapple
- Michael Preece as Nayler (as Mike Preece)
- Charles Washburn as Papuan
- Cliff Bell Jr. as Worker
- Alex Gradussov as Russian Delegate
- Jamie Alexander as Reporter (as Jim Alexander)
- Saul David as Berl Tanen
- Bernard Pike as Associate Judge
- Eduard Fuchs as Israeli Delegate (as Eddie Fuchs)

== Production ==
=== Development ===
The book was published in the US as You Shall Know Them in 1953. The New York Times called it a "humanely sardonic story". It became a best seller.

The author adapted the novel into the play Zoo, which was performed in Paris. Otto Preminger optioned the stage rights and got Nelson Gidding to adapt it under the title The Case of the Troublesome Topis.

Giddings later said he showed the original novel by Jean Bruller writing as "Vercors" to Otto Preminger with the idea of making a film of the book. After they viewed a play based on the novel presented in Carcassonne, Preminger agreed but later became busy with other film projects.

Giddings ended up writing a screenplay. The rights to the novel were sold to producer Saul David after he left 20th Century Fox. It was the first film he was to make under a deal with Universal.

The film was to have been the first major feature film production of ABC Pictures with the film crew planning on shooting in Papua New Guinea where an Australian Army General who Gidding had known in World War II provided extensive cooperation to the production.

One of the producers from ABC Pictures wanted to talk to David about the film at short notice as he was flying to Europe. David refused to meet him due to the medical problems of David's daughter that precluded a meeting; however, David refused to tell the producer why he would not see him. Thinking himself insulted, the producer placed the film on hold with the production of the film being purchased by Universal Pictures who insisted the film be shot in much safer and economical Jamaican locations.

Burt Reynolds agreed to star, turning down a lead role in MASH (1970) to do the film.

=== Shooting ===
Filming started 6 January 1969.

On the first day of shooting David sacked his director Richard Wilson and replaced him with Gordon Douglas who directed David's In Like Flint. The termination was put down to "creative differences".

After Burt Reynolds and Susan Clark were cast, Karl Malden expressed interest in playing the role of Otto Krebs that the screenplay described as a fat man. David thought Malden too thin and hired an actor he thought was corpulent, Roger C. Carmel, but was dismayed when Carmel arrived on location having slimmed down for the role.

Producer Saul David created and named his character of Berle Tanen after then-MCA executives Berle Adams and Ned Tanen.

Burt Reynolds later said the film had a "good script. The guy's a good writer, Lorenzo Semple Jr. Badly directed, kind of sloughed off. Susan Clark was good; she's a good actress. But nobody knew how to sell the picture. Any time you have Pat Suzuki dressed as a small ape, I think you're in trouble."

== Reception ==
The film was a critical and financial failure.

David had a number of films in development at Universal—A Stretch on the River, Marie Beginning, Dove Creek Rodeo and The Tuck—but none were made.

== See also ==
- Little Fuzzy, a novel series with a similar story
