= Doctors' Private Lives =

- Written by: James Henerson
- Directed by: Steven Stern
- Starring: John Gavin; Donna Mills; Ed Nelson; Barbara Anderson
- Music by: Richard Markowitz
- Country of origin: United States
- Original language: English
- No. of episodes: 4

Production
- Executive producer: David Gerber
- Producer: Robert Stambler
- Cinematography: Howard Schwartz
- Editors: Ronald LaVine; David Wages
- Running time: 100 minutes
- Production company: Columbia Pictures Television

Original release
- Network: ABC
- Release: March 20, 1978
- Release: April 5 – April 26, 1978

Doctors' Private Lives is a 1978 American made-for-television drama film starring John Gavin, Donna Mills, Ed Nelson, Barbara Anderson, and directed by Steven Stern. It was broadcast on ABC on March 20, 1978.

It was a pilot for a short-lived television series of the same name that aired for four episodes from April 5 to April 26, 1979.

== Cast ==
- John Gavin as Dr. Jeffrey Latimer
- Donna Mills as Dr. Beth Demery
- Ed Nelson as Dr. Mike Wise
- Barbara Anderson as Frances Latimer
- William Kerwin as Dr. George Bana
- Bettye Ackerman as Sylvia
- John Randolph as Irv
- Randolph Powell as Dr. Rick Calder
- Fawne Harriman as Phyllis
- Leigh McCloskey as Kenny
- Kim Hamilton as Kitty
- Elinor Donahue as Mona Wise

== Reception ==
The Los Angeles Times called the film "lively but ludicrous and verges on self parody." It ranked 86th out of 114 shows airing that season, with an average 14.1/26 rating/share.

== TV miniseries ==
One year after the TV movie's network premiere, a four-episode miniseries was produced and directed by Edward M. Abroms, Richard Benedict and Marc Daniels. John Gavin, Ed Nelson and Randolph Powell reprised their respective roles from the 1978 TV movie. The miniseries focused on the personal and professional crises of two heart surgeons: Chief Surgeon Dr. Michael Wise and cardiovascular Unit Chief Dr. Jeffrey Latimer.

=== Cast ===
- Ed Nelson as Dr. Michael Wise
- John Gavin as Dr. Jeffrey Latimer
- Randolph Powell as Dr. Rick Calder
- Phil Levien as Kenny Wise
- Gwen Humble as Sheila Castle
- Eddie Benton as Nurse Diane Cooper

=== Episodes ===
No.	Title	Directed by	Written by	Original release date
1	"Doctors' Private Lives: Part 1"	Unknown	Unknown	April 5, 1979
A distaff surgeon who joins the hospital unit headed by Dr. Latimer becomes romantically involved with his associate, Dr. Wise.
2	"Doctors' Private Lives: Part 2"	Unknown	Unknown	April 12, 1979
Dr. Wise confronts his feelings for his ex-wife when he learns that she and her lover have separated; Dr. Latimer has to step in when a nurse in the hospital falls in love with a patient.
3	"Doctors' Private Lives: Part 3"	Unknown	Unknown	April 19, 1979
A young doctor is blamed for the death of some teenagers when a prescription drug is found in their smashed-up auto.
4	"Doctors' Private Lives: Part 4"	Unknown	Unknown	April 26, 1979
A young attorney uses her romance with a medical student to gain malpractice evidence against two heart surgeons.
