= Alexandra Lamy =

French actress, director, and screenwriter (born 1971)

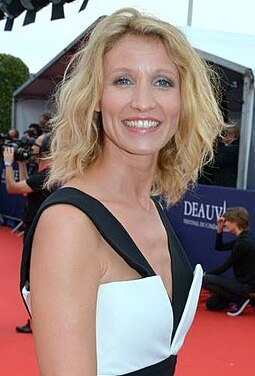
- Lamy at the 2014 Deauville American Film Festival
- Born: Alexandra Paulette Mathilde Lamy; 14 October 1971 (age 54); Villecresnes, Val-de-Marne, France
- Occupations: Actress, director, screenwriter
- Years active: 1994–present
- Spouse: Jean Dujardin (m. 2009; div. 2014)
- Partner: Thomas Jouannet (1995–2003)
- Children: Chloé Jouannet
- Relatives: Audrey Lamy (sister); François Lamy (cousin)

Alexandra Lamy (French pronunciation: [alɛksɑ̃dʁa lami]; born 14 October 1971) is a French actress, director, and screenwriter. She gained widespread recognition for her role as "Alex" or "Chouchou" in the television series Un gars, une fille (1999–2003), and has since established herself as a leading figure in French cinema, earning a nomination for the César Award for Best Actress in 2019.

== Early life and education ==
Lamy was born in Villecresnes, near Paris, but spent most of her childhood in the south of France, primarily in La Grande-Motte and Alès.

She developed an interest in acting and took classes at the Nîmes Conservatory. After completing her baccalaureate, she moved to Paris to pursue her career, studying at the prestigious Cours Florent. During this time, she deliberately worked on eliminating her Southern French accent for professional reasons.

Her younger sister, Audrey Lamy, is also a well-known actress in France.

== Career ==
=== Television breakthrough (1999–2003) ===
Lamy's career began in the mid-1990s with various theatre roles. Her breakthrough came in 1999 when she was cast as Alex, opposite Jean Dujardin's character, in the French adaptation of the Canadian comedy sketch show, Un gars, une fille. The series, which chronicled the daily life and relationship challenges of a couple, became a huge cultural success in France, running for 439 episodes until 2003.

=== Film and theatre success (2004–2015) ===
Following the conclusion of the series, Lamy focused on diversifying her career. She returned to the stage and earned her first major acting nomination in 2004, receiving a nomination for the Molière Award for Best Female Newcomer for her performance in the play Théorbe.

She transitioned to film, appearing in supporting roles in comedies like L'Antidote (2005) and Brice de Nice (2005). Lamy demonstrated her dramatic range by starring in François Ozon's fantasy drama Ricky (2009) and later earned significant praise for her role as a dedicated mother in the 2013 drama The Finishers (De toutes nos forces).

=== Leading roles and critical acclaim (2016–present) ===
The latter half of the 2010s saw Lamy taking on a series of highly successful leading roles. Her performance in the comedy Back to Mom's (Retour chez ma mère, 2016) was a major box-office hit. She cemented her critical success in 2018 with Rolling to You (Tout le monde debout), directed by Franck Dubosc, for which she received a nomination for the César Award for Best Actress in 2019. For the same role, she won the Globe de Cristal Award for Best Comedy Actress.

In 2022, Lamy made her directorial debut with the television film Touchées (Touched), which focuses on the lives of women victims of domestic violence.

Lamy was appointed a Knight (Chevalier) of the Ordre national du Mérite in November 2017. She was also inducted into the Musée Grévin in 2018.

== Personal life ==
Lamy was in a relationship with actor Thomas Jouannet from 1995 to 2003. They have one daughter, Chloé Jouannet, born in 1997, who has also pursued an acting career.

She began dating her Un gars, une fille co-star Jean Dujardin in 2003. They married in 2009 and were officially divorced in December 2014.

== Theatre ==
Year	Title	Author	Director	Notes
1994	La Poule aux œufs d'or	Alexandre Vial	Michel Galabru	
2003	Théorbe	Christian Siméon	Didier Long	Nominated – Molière Award for Best Female Newcomer
2006–2007	Two for the Seesaw	William Gibson	Bernard Murat	Co-starred with Jean Dujardin

== Filmography ==
=== Film ===
Year	Title	Role	Notes
2003	Rien que du bonheur	Manon	
2005	L'Antidote	Elisabeth	
2005	Brice de Nice	Alice de Nice	
2006	Au suivant !	Joséphine	
2008	Modern Love	Marie	
2009	Ricky	Katie	
2009	Lucky Luke	Belle	
2010	L'Oncle Charles	Alexandra	
2011	Possessions	Gladys	
2012	J'enrage de son absence	Mado	
2012	The Players (Les Infidèles)	Lisa	Segment: La Mouche
2013	The Finishers (De toutes nos forces)	Claire Amblard	
2014	Jamais le premier soir	Julie	
2015	Bis	Caroline	
2016	Back to Mom's (Retour chez ma mère)	Stéphanie Mazerin	
2016	Vincent	Nathalie	
2017	L'embarras du choix	Juliette	
2017	Nos Patriotes	The Doctor	
2018	Rolling to You (Tout le monde debout)	Florence	
2018	Le Poulain	Agnès	
2019	Chamboultout	Béatrice	
2020	Fahim	Mathilde	
2020	Belle fille	Louise	
2021	Un tour chez ma fille	Stéphanie Mazerin	
2021	The Test (Le test)	Annie Castillon	
2023	Alibi.com 2	Aufrey	
2023	Princes of the Desert (Zodi & Tehu, frères du désert)	Julia	
2023	The Book of Wonders (La Chambre des merveilles)	Thelma	
2024	The Green Promise (La Promesse verte)	Carole Caron	
2024	Louise Violet	Louise Violet	
2025	Moon the Panda (Moon le Panda)	Emma Zhao	
2025	Jean Valjean	Magloire	
2026	Santiago: The Camino Therapy (Compostelle)	Fred	
2026	Good Vibes Only (Pour le plaisir)	Fanny	
2026	L'île de la Demoiselle	Marguerite de Navarre	

=== Television ===
Year	Title	Role	Notes
1999–2003	Un gars, une fille	Alex "Chouchou"	Series regular (439 episodes)
2007	Palizzi	Madame de Saxe	1 episode
2008	A Man and His Dog (Un homme et son chien)	The young woman	Television film
2013	Avis de Mistral	Alice	Television film
2015	Une chance de trop	Alice Lambert	Miniseries (6 episodes)
2017	Scènes de ménages	Adeline	1 episode (Guest star with her sister Audrey Lamy)
2020	Les Petits Meurtres d'Agatha Christie	Annie Greco	Episode: La Nuit qui ne finit pas
2022	Touchées	—	Television film; Director and Screenwriter
2023	Killer Coaster	Sandrine	Miniseries (8 episodes)
2023	Quentin Blake's Box of Treasures		1 episode

== Awards and nominations ==
Year	Award	Category	Work	Result	Ref
2004	Molière Award	Best Female Newcomer	Théorbe	Nominated: Molière Award for Best Female Newcomer	
2017	L'Alpe d'Huez International Comedy Film Festival	Best Acting Award	L'embarras du choix	Won	
2019	César Award	Best Actress	Rolling to You (Tout le monde debout)	Nominated	
2019	Globes de Cristal Awards	Best Comedy Actress	Rolling to You (Tout le monde debout)	Won	
