= Pierre Boutron =

French actor and director

- Born: 11 November 1947 (age 78); Portugal
- Occupations: Film director, screenwriter
- Years active: 1971–2012

Pierre Boutron (born 11 November 1947 in Portugal) is a French actor and director. He was married to actress Magali Renoir.

== Biography ==
Pierre Boutron is a well-known TV director. His Des enfants dans les arbres or Les Faux-fuyants was a great success. He filmed a version of L'Affaire Dominici, with Michel Serrault, and Désiré Landru, starring Patrick Timsit. His adaptation of Le Silence de la mer by Vercors was also a success. In 2006, he made a political film for Canal+ with Le Rainbow Warrior. While most of his work has been for television, Boutron has produced four feature films, including Les Années sandwiches in 1988.

== Theater ==
=== Actor ===
Year	Title	Author	Director
1972	Clérambard	Marcel Aymé	Jean-Paul Cisife
1974	Thus Spoke Zarathustra	Friedrich Nietzsche	Jean-Louis Barrault
1975	Christophe Colomb	Paul Claudel	Jean-Louis Barrault (2)

=== Director ===
Year	Title	Author	Notes
1975–77	The Picture of Dorian Gray	Oscar Wilde	Théâtre des Célestins
1978	Le Jour et la nuit	Élie Pressmann	Odéon-Théâtre de l'Europe
1978	Nous ne connaissons pas la même personne	François-Marie Banier	Théâtre Édouard VII
1982	The Importance of Being Earnest	Oscar Wilde	Théâtre des Mathurins
1986	Le Nègre	Didier Van Cauwelaert	Théâtre des Bouffes-Parisiens
1986	La Villa bleue	Jean-Claude Brisville	Espace Cardin
1987	The Imaginary Invalid	Molière	Théâtre de l'Atelier
1994	La Ville dont le prince est un enfant	Henry de Montherlant	Théâtre Hébertot

== Filmography ==
Year	Title	Role	Notes
1971	Le soldat et la sorcière	Actor	TV movie directed by Jean-Paul Carrère
1976	Christophe Colomb	Actor	TV movie directed by Jean-Paul Carrère (2)
1977	Le portrait de Dorian Gray	Director & writer	
1979	Les fourberies de Scapin	Stage director	TV movie directed by Paul-Robin Banhaïoun
1979	Mon ami Gaylord	Actor	TV mini-series directed by Pierre Goutas
1980	Le devine-vent	Actor	TV movie directed by Régis Forissier
1982	Cinéma 16	Director & writer	TV series (1 episode)
1982	Caméra une première	Director & writer	TV series (1 episode)
1984	Christmas Carol	Director & writer	TV movie
1984	L'aide-mémoire	Director	TV movie
1986	Les étonnements d'un couple moderne	Director & Actor	TV movie 7 d'Or for Best Movie Made for TV
1986	Une femme innocente	Director & writer	TV movie
1986	Ciboulette	Writer	TV movie directed by Pierre Jourdan
1987	Cinéma 16	Director & writer	TV series (1 episode)
1988	Les années sandwiches	Director & writer	
1989	Le nègre	Stage director	TV movie directed by Yves-André Hubert
1990	S.O.S. disparus	Director	TV series (3 episodes)
1990	Le pitre	Stage director	TV movie directed by Josée Dayan
1991	Berlin Lady	Director & writer	TV mini-series
1991	La grande collection	Director	TV series (1 episode)
1993	Screen Two	Director	TV series (1 episode)
1994	Des enfants dans les arbres	Director & writer	TV movie
1994	Rapt à crédit	Director & writer	TV movie
1995	Fiesta	Director & writer	Cinequest San Jose Film Festival - Best Feature; Nominated - Cinequest San Jose Film Festival - Maverick Spirit Award
1996–2003	Le juge est une femme	Director & writer	TV series (13 episodes)
1997	Messieurs les enfants	Director, writer & Actor	
1999	L'histoire du samedi	Director & writer	TV series (1 episode)
2000	Les faux-fuyants	Director & writer	TV movie
2000	Anibal	Director & writer	TV movie
2002	Mademoiselle Else	Director & writer	TV movie
2003	L'affaire Dominici	Director & writer	TV movie Nominated - International Emmy Award for best TV movie or miniseries
2004	Le Silence de la Mer	Director	TV movie Saint-Tropez Fiction TV Festival - Best TV Movie
2004	Le voyageur sans bagage	Director & writer	TV movie
2004	La cliente	Director & writer	TV movie
2005	Désiré Landru	Director & writer	TV movie
2006	Le Rainbow Warrior	Director	TV movie
2006	Monsieur Léon	Director & writer	TV movie
2008	Braquage en famille	Director & writer	TV movie
2009	La reine morte	Director	TV movie
2010	Vivace	Director	TV movie
2010	Double enquête	Director & writer	TV movie
2012	L'innocent	Director & writer	TV movie
