= Infidèle =

French TV serial

Infidèle is a French television miniseries consisting of six episodes lasting 52 minutes each, created by Didier Le Pêcheur for TF1. It premiered on 6 January 2019 in Belgium at La Une, while in France it premiered on 7 January 2019. It is an adaptation of the 2015 British television series Doctor Foster. Created and written by Mike Bartlett.

It was successful, each episode had nearly 5.000.000 watchers.

== Cast ==
- Claire Keim as Emma
- Jonathan Zaccaï as Mattéo
- Félix Lefebvre as Luigi
- Chloé Jouannet as Candice
- Philippe Torreton as Rodolphe
- Natalia Dontcheva as Ingrid
- Sandra Parfait as Linda
- Olivier Claverie as Yves
- Vanessa David as Gwenaëlle
- Mylène Demongeot as Giulia
- Philippe Lefebvre as Nils
- Mathieu Madénian as Castain
