= Élodie Bradford =

- Genre: Police series
- Created by: Lionel Bailliu
- Starring: Armelle Deutsch, Pierre LaPlace, Jean-Pierre Malignon
- Country of origin: France
- Original language: French
- No. of seasons: 1
- No. of episodes: 5

Production
- Running time: 90 minutes

Original release
- Network: M6
- Release: October 20, 2004

Élodie Bradford is a French television series created by Lionel Bailliu and broadcast since 20 October 2004 on the French television network M6.

== Synopsis ==
This series depicts Élodie Bradford, a glamorous and gaffe-prone police captain.

== Cast ==
| Name | Portrayed by |
|---|---|
| Élodie Bradford | Armelle Deutsch |
| Robert Grisou | Pierre LaPlace |
| Faucheux | Jean-Pierre Malignon |

=== Guest ===
- Philippe Lefebvre : Sébastien Auger (épisode 1)
- Anthony Delon : Antoine Morfaux (épisode 1)
- Monalisa Basarab : Olga (épisode 1)
- Frédéric Diefenthal : Julien Lemaître (épisode 2)
- Éric Savin : Ravanello (épisode 2)
- Vincent Desagnat : Fabrice Saintange (épisode 3)
- Thomas Jouannet : Sébastien Fondant (épisode 3)
- Jean-Pierre Michaël : Nicolas (épisode 4)
- Didier Bezace : Bertrand Larchet (épisode 4)
- Nicolas Gob : Éric (épisode 4)
- Raphaël Personnaz : Arnaud (épisode 4)
- Philippe Bas : Damien Moreno (épisode 5)
- Micky Sebastian : Marie-France Delort (épisode 5)
- Guillaume Delorme : Le Garrec (épisode 5)
- Zinedine Soualem : Franck Bécker (épisode 5)
- François Levantal : François Forcalquier (épisode 5)
- Thierry Godard : Jean-Louis Cazenave (épisode 5)

== Recognition ==
- Won "Grand prix de la série" (Grand prize of the series) for the episode "Une femme à la mer" at the 2007 International Television Film Festival of Luchon.

== Episodes ==
1. Pilot
2. "Les crimes étaient presque parfaits" (The crimes were almost perfect)
3. "Un ami pour Élodie" (A friend for Élodie)
4. "Intouchables" (Untouchables)
5. "Une femme à la mer" (A woman at the sea)
