= Enigma (2025 film) =

2025 American documentary film

- Official poster
- Directed by: Zackary Drucker
- Produced by: Madison Passarelli; Douglas Banker; Alex Garinger; Noah Levy; Donovan Lovell; Stephen B. Strout
- Starring: Amanda Lear; April Ashley; Marie-Pierre Pruvot; Dolly Van Doll
- Cinematography: Clément Beauvois
- Edited by: Claire Didier
- Music by: Danny Bensi; Saunder Jurriaans; James Newberry
- Production companies: HBO Documentary Films; Story Syndicate; Five All in the Fifth Entertainment; Pacific Films
- Distributed by: HBO
- Release dates: January 28, 2025 (Sundance); June 24, 2025 (United States)
- Running time: 94 minutes
- Country: United States
- Language: English

Enigma is a 2025 American documentary film, directed by Zackary Drucker. It follows April Ashley and Amanda Lear, as they navigated public scrutiny of their identities.

It had its world premiere at the 2025 Sundance Film Festival on January 28, 2025, and was released on June 24, 2025, by HBO.

== Premise ==
April Ashley and Amanda Lear navigated public scrutiny of their identities in contrasting ways.

== Production ==
Due to the death of April Ashley, Drucker incorporated unseen interviews and footage.

== Release ==
It had its world premiere at the 2025 Sundance Film Festival on January 28, 2025. It also screened at the BFI Flare: London LGBTIQ+ Film Festival on March 21, 2025. It was released on June 24, 2025.

== Reception ==
=== Criticism by Amanda Lear ===
In an email to The Washington Post, Lear denounced the film, calling it "a pathetic piece of trash" and described it as "an attempt to trick me and possibly ‘out’ me because of a supposed friendship with this April Ashley,” dismissing stories of their friendship as fake news. Lear also wrote that she signed an agreement before shooting that “clearly stated that there would be NO MENTION of all the rubbish featured in that film” and that her lawyers had sent a cease-and-desist letter to HBO. A spokesperson for HBO responded by saying that the appearance agreement Lear signed before shooting did not limit the topics discussed on-camera and that HBO had not received any cease-and-desist communication from Lear's team. Director Zackary Drucker defended the film's integrity, asserting it was made “from a place of reverence and love, not just for her as an icon, but as a human being.”

=== Critical reception ===
Gary Grimes of Attitude gave the film four out of five stars writing: "There is so much to enjoy in this tale of these truly enigmatic, glamourous and singular women." Mey Rude of Out gave the film five out of five stars writing: "Drucker is documenting vital parts of trans history — making sure that no one can deny that we've always been here, highlighting the fact that we will always be here, and underscoring the many ways in which no one can erase us."
