= Bimboland =

- Theatrical release poster
- Directed by: Ariel Zeitoun
- Written by: Roselyne Bosch
- Produced by: Alain Goldman; Ariel Zeitoun
- Starring: Judith Godrèche; Aure Atika; Gérard Depardieu
- Cinematography: Thierry Jault
- Edited by: Hugues Darmois
- Production companies: Gaumont; Légende Films; TF1 Films Production
- Distributed by: Gaumont Buena Vista International
- Release date: 23 December 1998
- Running time: 90 minutes
- Country: France
- Language: French

Bimboland is a 1998 French comedy film directed by Ariel Zeitoun and written by Roselyne Bosch. The film stars Judith Godrèche, Aure Atika, Gérard Depardieu, Sophie Forte, Armelle and Dany Boon. It was released on December 23, 1998, by Gaumont Buena Vista International.

== Plot ==
Cécile Bussy, a doctoral student in ethnology at the University of Nice, is writing a thesis on the last primitive people, but her PhD is ruined by the revelation that this group has since adopted modern civilization. To salvage her university career, Cécile is forced to work as the assistant of Professor Laurent Gaspard, an expert in Māori culture. Cécile finds the older Laurent attractive, but he cares only for young bombshells and shows no interest in the quiet and proper Cécile.

At the university residence, Cécile meets Alex, a young, hyper-feminine woman who uninhibitedly uses her charms to gain advantages. Cécile decides that the bimbos of the French Riviera would make an excellent subject for a PhD; she creates a persona for herself to infiltrate this population as part of a new ethnological study. Along the way, she meets Laurent, who, even though her "bimbo" disguise is minimal, fails to recognize her and becomes besotted with her.

== Cast ==
- Judith Godrèche as Cécile Bussy
- Aure Atika as Alex Baretto
- Gérard Depardieu as Laurent Gaspard
- Sophie Forte as Karène Leblond
- Armelle as Nathalie
- Dany Boon as Greg
- Amanda Lear as Gina
- Laëtitia Lacroix as Sandra
- Thiam Aïssatou as Ludmilla
- Saskia Mulder as Vanessa
- Évelyne Buyle as Gaëlle Bussy
- Valerie Barriere as Sonia
- Monique Letitre as Elisabeth
- Denis Braccini as night club bouncer
- Magali Farrugia as Magali
- Michel Modo as Aristide Roumestan

== Reception ==
Bimboland was critically and commercially unsuccessful in France upon release, selling 297,965 admissions. Variety noted that while the film did attempt to offer more than the "lowbrow" sex comedy suggested by its title, it ultimately failed as a satire of the 1990s "dating game". The review called the film a "hodgepodge that's occasionally funny and not unpleasant to watch, but fairly forgettable once the houselights come up" and "strictly a Euro TV item".

== Home media ==
Bimboland was released on DVD and on VOD on several streaming services including Canal+.
