= Un gars, une fille (French TV series) =

- Created by: Guy A. Lepage
- Based on: Un gars, une fille
- Starring: Jean Dujardin; Alexandra Lamy; Lénie Ficara; Nemo Schiffman
- Country of origin: France
- Original language: French

Production
- Executive producer: Isabelle Camus
- Producers: Productions 22; Hélène Jacques
- Camera setup: Single camera
- Running time: 7 minutes

Original release
- Network: France 2
- Release: 11 October 1999 – 16 October 2003

Un gars, une fille (French pronunciation: [œ̃ ɡɑ yn fij], A Guy, A Girl) is a French comedy television series created by Isabelle Camus and Hélène Jacques, based on the eponymous 1997 Quebec TV series. It stars Jean Dujardin and Alexandra Lamy, who met during the audition for the series, and started a real-life relationship during the last year of the show. Its format was a series of 7-minute-long episodes depicting the daily lives and conflicts of a couple named Jean and Alex (like their real-name counterparts), nicknamed "Loulou" and "Chouchou". It ran from 1999 to 2003 and had a 2023 sequel named Un gars, une fille, un frère, une sœur.

The series was highly successful, gathering 5 million viewers each day, or a third of the people watching television during that time slot. A 2001 two-parter Christmas special garnered a 27.4% market share (approximately 6 million people); the New Year's special 25%. The programme won a Sept d'or award for best entertainment show in 2001.

Dujardin and Lamy met during their audition for the series; subsequently, like their characters, they fell in love during production. Un gars, Une fille consists of 5 seasons for a total of 486 episodes. Dujardin and Lamy also reprised their roles in "À Paris", a 1999 episode of the original series set in Paris.

== Production and concept ==
Each episode of the series comprises a series of sketches, each sketch being filmed in a single, steady shot. Many scenes feature only Dujardin and Lamy, but some include supporting characters (such as friends, or Alex's mother; or occasional famous guests), who appear either in the background or with their faces out of shot.
