= 8th Wonderland =

2008 French drama film

- Film poster
- Directed by: Nicolas Alberny; Jean Mach
- Starring: Matthew Géczy; Robert William Bradford; Antony Hickling
- Release date: October 2008 (Montpellier)
- Running time: 94 minutes
- Country: France
- Language: French

8th Wonderland is a 2008 French drama film directed by Nicolas Alberny and Jean Mach.

== Plot ==
The movie tells the story of the first virtual state a globally composed collective of hundreds of people founded on the Internet. They want to counteract the words of politics. Every week the citizens of the 8th Wonderland vote on the next actions, for example, the Vatican is decorated with condom machines, a Darwin Bible is printed in large numbers, an atomic deal between Russia and Iran is prevented by very deliberate mistranslation and football professionals worth millions are sold in a Chinese sweatshop shipped to the handmade mass shoe production.

With their radicalizing actions, the web revolutionaries are shaking not only the international media but also the Western secret services. When John McClane, an impostor, claims to be the founder and head of the 8th Wonderland and exploits its popularity for commercials, the Internet partisans must act if they want to save face. They bring down a multinational company and force the G8 heads of state to initiate an anti-HIV program.

At the same time, terrorist attacks are carried out military conflicts are provoked and the blame is placed on 8. Wonderland, even though the country has nothing to do with it. The mood in the population turns against the country and McClane is ultimately shot while attempting to escape. Shortly before the secret services destroy the server farm of the 8th Wonderland, McClane sends a video to all television stations in which he announces that he has nothing to do with the 8th Wonderland and that the 8th Wonderland is not responsible for the terrorist attacks. After the destruction of the 8th Wonderland, the 9th Wonderland is founded, which ties in with the actions of the previous country.
