= Loggerheads (1978 film) =

- Directed by: Franco Castellano; Giuseppe Moccia
- Written by: Franco Castellano; Giuseppe Moccia
- Produced by: Luciano Martino
- Starring: Adriano Celentano; Giuseppe Diamanti; Claudio Bigagli; Amanda Lear
- Cinematography: Giancarlo Ferrando
- Edited by: Antonio Siciliano
- Music by: Carlo Rustichelli
- Release date: 1978
- Running time: 96 minutes
- Country: Italy
- Language: Italian

Loggerheads, originally titled Zio Adolfo, in arte Führer (literally "Uncle Adolf, AKA Führer"), is a 1978 Italian comedy film directed by the duo Castellano & Pipolo. It stars singer Adriano Celentano in the dual role of two brothers on opposite sides during the Nazi Germany era.

A parody of the life of Adolf Hitler, Loggerheads is partly a collage film, combining dubbed of historical archive footage with similarly shot original footage featuring Celentano and other actors.

== Plot ==
During the Weimar Germany, twin brothers Hermann and Gustav find themselves on opposite ends of the political spectrum: Hermann is a staunch sympathizer of the emerging Nazi party and a mediocre illusionist whose magic tricks always result in the death of his assistant; Gustav is an anarchist who prints and distributes anti-Nazi propaganda. With the rise of Adolf Hitler to power, Hermann enlists in the SS and quickly becomes a colonel and a personal friend of Hitler. Gustav secretly plots and executes several extravagant, yet unsuccessful, attempts to assassinate Hitler.

As Germany prepares for World War II, many young men enroll in the German army. In Berlin, newly-wed Hans is drafted and separated from his wife Irma on their wedding night. Hermann, aware of his brother's opposition to the Nazi regime but unaware of his assassination plots, visits Gustav at his hideout. Arguing that fate should decide which of the two ideologies should prevail, Hermann challenges Gustav to a game of Russian roulette. The game continues indefinitely, as the gun never fires and the two brothers keep interrupting and resuming it day by day.

After the German defeat in the war and the death of Adolf Hitler, Hermann returns to his activity as an illusionist. Hans returns home and is finally reunited with Irma, but as the couple embraces for the first time in years, they both step on a landmine. Four decades later, the now elderly Hermann and Gustav are still continuing their game of Russian roulette, only to realize the gun had been empty all along.
