= Sanremo Young =

Italian casting show

- Genre: Talent show
- Creative director: Gianmarco Mazzi
- Presented by: Antonella Clerici
- Judges: Mara Maionchi; Rocco Hunt; Iva Zanicchi; Marco Masini; Cristina D'Avena; Angelo Baiguini; Mietta; Elisabetta Canalis
- Country of origin: Italy
- Original language: Italian
- No. of seasons: 2

Production
- Production location: Teatro Ariston
- Running time: 180 minutes

Original release
- Network: Rai 1
- Release: February 16, 2018

Sanremo Young is a teen talent show, devoted for young singers aged between 14 and 17, which takes inspiration from Sanremo Music Festival. The show, presented by Antonella Clerici, is held in the Teatro Ariston of Sanremo and broadcast on Rai 1.

== Format ==
The show is directed by Duccio Forzano and presented by Antonella Clerici, with the participation of various guests. The cast of young talents will be accompanied by the SanremoYoung Orchestra, entirely composed of musicians between the ages of 18 and 25, selected by Diego Basso. The choreographies are curated by Daniel Ezralow.

All the selected contestants will compete from the early evening, interpreting famous songs composed by great authors and performed by Italian and international artists. They will be judged by the Academy -a jury composed of different characters- and by the public televoting.

== First season ==
The first season begins on February 16, 2018 and will last for five weeks.

=== Contestants ===
1,137 young singers participated in the selections, but only twelve were selected for the cast:

- Matteo Markus Bok
- Sharon Caroccia
- Leonardo De Andreis
- Zaira Angela Di Grazia
- Ouiam El Mrieh
- Luna Farina
- Alessandro Franceschini
- Elena Manuele
- Bianca Moccia
- Eleonora Pieri
- Raffaele Renda
- Rocco Scarano
