= Alain-Philippe Malagnac d'Argens de Villèle =

Son of Roger Peyrefitte

- Malagnac c. 1980
- Born: 16 July 1951
- Died: 16 December 2000 (aged 49); Saint-Étienne-du-Grès, Provence-Alpes-Côte d'Azur, France
- Occupations: Socialite; businessman; art collector
- Spouse: Amanda Tap (m. 1979)
- Parent: Roger Peyrefitte (adoptive father)

Alain-Philippe Malagnac d'Argens de Villèle (16 July 1951 – 16 December 2000) was the adopted son of French writer Roger Peyrefitte, their relationship being a subject of several of the latter's works. Malagnac was also an art collector and the husband of singer Amanda Lear.

Scion of a French aristocratic family, 12-year-old Alain-Philippe had a minor role in the film Les Amitiés particulières (English title: This Special Friendship), released in 1964, based on Roger Peyrefitte's autobiographical novel. The two met during the film's making and began what was to be a long association professionally and personally. This formed the background to Peyrefitte's novel Notre Amour (Éd. Flammarion, 1967) and to L'Enfant de cœur (a pun on cœur 'heart' and chœur 'choir', an allusion to Malagnac's role as a choirboy in the film). At the age of 16, Malagnac became Peyrefitte's personal secretary and as a young man was adopted by Peyrefitte.

As an adult, Malagnac's career (often financed by Peyrefitte) included proprietorship of Le club Colony, one of the first openly gay nightclubs in Paris and briefly managing French singer Sylvie Vartan, a disastrous undertaking which almost caused bankruptcy for Peyrefitte, who was forced to sell artworks and erotic antiquities to pay the resulting debts.

In 1978, Malagnac met Amanda Lear in Paris and in April 1979, while on a trip to the United States, they married. Their marriage lasted 21 years until his death. On Saturday, December 16, 2000, Malagnac was killed by smoke in a fire at his recently bought farm house in Saint-Étienne-du-Grès. He died just six weeks after Peyrefitte.
