= Saul David (producer) =

American book editor and film producer (1921–1996)

- Born: June 27, 1921; Springfield, Massachusetts, U.S.
- Died: June 7, 1996 (aged 74)
- Education: Rhode Island School of Design
- Occupations: Book editor; film producer

Saul David (June 27, 1921 – June 7, 1996) was an American book editor and film producer.

== Early life ==
Born in Springfield, Massachusetts, he won an art competition and received a scholarship to the Rhode Island School of Design, which he attended from 1937 to 1940. After graduation he worked at a radio station in York, Pennsylvania, and on a newspaper in Port Huron, Michigan. During World War II, David enlisted in the US Army where he wrote for Yank, the Army Weekly and the Stars and Stripes in North Africa and Europe.

== Bantam Books ==
From 1950 to 1960 David worked at Bantam Books, starting as a publisher's reader then advancing to editorial director and editor in chief. He had known Bantam president Oscar Dystel when they worked on Stars and Stripes in Cairo. At Bantam David lured Ross Macdonald away from Pocket Books and hired artist James Avati. Rather than reprint several hardcover Western authors, David thought of hiring and promoting one author to write three original books for Bantam each year. From a shortlist of five authors, David chose Louis L'Amour who had become disillusioned with Fawcett publishing.

== Hollywood ==
David left Bantam to work for Columbia Pictures and Warner Brothers. While at Warner David acquired Helen Gurley Brown's book Sex and the Single Girl for the studio. When one studio executive told him the book had no plot, David replied "I told you that a hundred thousand dollars ago"; the studio had purchased a title, not a plot.

=== 20th Century Fox ===
He became a producer at 20th Century Fox with the 1964 World War II prisoner of war adventure Von Ryan's Express filmed on location in Italy with Frank Sinatra and a strong cast. He then produced three spy-fi films, Our Man Flint (1965), Fantastic Voyage (1966), and In Like Flint (1967). All four films were big commercial successes.

The plot of In Like Flint concerns three minutes missing from the life of the President of the United States. Ironically, when Fox edited out three minutes of In Like Flint to add more depth to the film, David left the studio.

Years later David was enraged by seeing ten to fifteen minutes cut from an Our Man Flint television broadcast that "was not so much re-edited as lobotomized into senselessness". He wrote to California Senator George Murphy to say that since a publisher is required to inform readers if they are buying and reading an abridged works so should television stations inform their viewers they are watching abridged films.

=== Later films ===
David produced Skullduggery (1970) originally for ABC Pictures, but after a disagreement the film and David went to Universal Pictures. Though he announced a busy production schedule of five films, none were made.

Still interested in science fiction, David recalled the book Logan's Run and produced the film in 1976. Logan's Run won a Special Achievement Academy Award for visual effects, which was presented by actor Roy Scheider to L.B. Abbott, Glen Robinson, and Matthew Yuricich at the 49th Annual Academy Awards show on March 28, 1977, at the Dorothy Chandler Pavilion. During his acceptance speech, Abbott said, "I want to very sincerely thank the Board of Directors of the Academy. The producer, Mr. Saul David, and that great host of wonderful helpers made this accolade possible for me."

MGM hired David to produce a television version of the film in 1977 but then fired him and "hired an inept team of producers who knew nothing whatever about science fiction", said William F. Nolan. David died of congestive heart failure in Culver City, California.

== Filmography ==
- Von Ryan's Express (1964)
- Our Man Flint (1965)
- Fantastic Voyage (1966)
- In Like Flint (1967)
- Skullduggery (1970) – Berl Tanen (final film role)
- Logan's Run (1976)
- Ravagers (1979)

== Notes ==
David, Saul The Industry: Life in the Hollywood Fast Lane 1981 Times Books
