= Ne jouez pas avec les Martiens =

- Directed by: Henri Lanoë
- Screenplay by: Henri Lanoë; Johanna Harwood
- Produced by: Georges Casati; Philippe de Broca
- Starring: Jean Rochefort; Macha Méril
- Cinematography: René Mathelin
- Music by: René Longuet, Henri Lanoë
- Distributed by: Fildebroc; Les Productions Artistes Associés; United Artists
- Release date: 1967
- Running time: 100 min.
- Country: France
- Language: French

Ne jouez pas avec les Martiens or Don't Play with Martians is a 1967 comedy film starring Jean Rochefort and Macha Méril shot in Crozon.

== Synopsis ==
The incompetent journalist René Mastier and photographer Padirac, working for the Gazette de Paris, having blundered a assignment in Rio de Janeiro, are recalled to Paris by their editor and instructed to cover the birth of quintuplets on the island of Locmaria off the coast of Brittany.

Their arrival on the island is not easy: Their equipment falls overboard as they disembark, the locals are not very hospitable, and they must stay in an unheated room.

They end up meeting Doctor Créache, the island's doctor, and his nurse Yvonne, who confesses to them that the pregnant girl is not married, and that the father is unknown. Outraged by this news, the editor of the newspaper orders Mastier to find a husband for the woman, for the sake of the story.

In the evening, Yvonne, who likes to tell unfounded stories, announces by telex to journalists that Martians have landed on the island. In Paris they believe the news, and the President of the Republic even prepares to receive the visitors at the Élysée.

The journalists decide to leave when they learn that the news about Martians is false. But the next day, the island's communications are suddenly cut off from the mainland as six extraterrestrials enter the hotel where the journalists are staying. The two journalists try to interview the extraterrestrials about their way of life, but they are not very communicative and admit only that they come from Gamma-2.

During this time, the woman's babies are born: sextuplets. Yvonne soon discovers that one of the aliens is the father of the children and that he fathered them by kissing the mother (which is the Gammians' way of reproducing). By the time the authorities finally land on the island, the extraterrestrials have departed with the mother and children. The two journalists are left with no evidence to prove the story.

== Cast ==
- Jean Rochefort : René Mastier
- Macha Méril : Maryvonne Guéguen
- André Valardy : Padirac
- Frédéric de Pasquale : Job
- Sacha Briquet : Méry
- Pierre Dac : Doctor Creac'h
- Haydée Politoff : The maid
- Albert Michel
