= Roselyne Bosch =

French film producer, writer and film director

- Born: 1961 (age 64–65); Avignon, France
- Occupations: Journalist, screenwriter, film director
- Spouse: Alain Goldman (m. 1995)

Roselyne Bosch, also known as Rose Bosch (born 1961) is a French journalist, screenwriter and film director.

She was born in Avignon. Her father was a Catalan who fled Francoist Spain for political refuge, and her mother was an Italian.

She worked as a journalist for the French news magazine Le Point, and her reporting included portraits of Stephen Hawking, the Basque conflict, child trafficking in Sri Lanka, famine in Nordeste Brasil, and floods in Bangladesh. In 1991, she was a finalist for the Albert Londres prize but did not win.

In 1992, she became interested in Christopher Columbus while researching a 1987 article on Spain's long-range plans for celebrating the 500th anniversary of Columbus' first voyage, and she wrote the screenplay of the film 1492: Conquest of Paradise directed by Ridley Scott. In 2010, she wrote and directed the film The Round Up about the Vel' d'Hiv Roundup during Vichy France.

She is married to film producer Alain Goldman with whom she has two children.

== Selected filmography ==
Film

| Year | Title | Director | Writer |
|---|---|---|---|
| 1992 | 1492: Conquest of Paradise (Note: Also co-producer) | No | Yes |
| 1998 | En plein cœur | No | Yes |
| 1998 | Bimboland | No | Yes |
| 2003 | Le Pacte du silence | No | Yes |
| 2005 | Animal | Yes | Yes |
| 2010 | The Round Up | Yes | Yes |
| 2014 | My Summer in Provence | Yes | Yes |

TV writer

| Year | Title | Notes |
|---|---|---|
| 1985-1987 | Hôtel de police | 14 episodes |
