= Back to Mom's =

- Theatrical release poster
- Retour chez ma mère
- Directed by: Éric Lavaine
- Written by: Éric Lavaine; Héctor Cabello Reyes
- Produced by: Vincent Roget; Jérôme Seydoux; Gala Vara Eiriz
- Starring: Josiane Balasko; Alexandra Lamy; Mathilde Seigner
- Cinematography: François Hernandez
- Edited by: Vincent Zuffranieri
- Music by: Fabien Cahen
- Production company: Same Player
- Distributed by: Pathé
- Release date: 1 June 2016
- Running time: 97 minutes
- Country: France
- Language: French
- Budget: $9.4 million
- Box office: $17.5 million

Back to Mom's (original title: Retour chez ma mère) is a 2016 French comedy film directed by Éric Lavaine.

== Plot ==
This is the story of a woman of forty, Stephanie, who loses her job in an architectural firm and is forced to move back in with her mother. For her, it's double pain : she must live with her mother every day and face the jealousy of her brothers and sisters.

== Cast ==
- Josiane Balasko as Jacqueline Mazerin
- Alexandra Lamy as Stéphanie Mazerin
- Mathilde Seigner as Carole Mazerin
- Philippe Lefebvre as Nicolas Mazerin
- Jérôme Commandeur as Alain Bordier
- Didier Flamand as Jean
- Cécile Rebboah as Charlotte
- Guilaine Londez as Catherine
- Alexandra Campanacci as Sylvie
- Nathan Dellemme as Roger
- Patrick Bosso as Michel, job center agent

== Production ==
The film was shot in Paris and Aix-en-Provence. It started in June 2015 and ended 20 August 2015.
