= Jean Bruller =

French writer and illustrator (1902–1991)

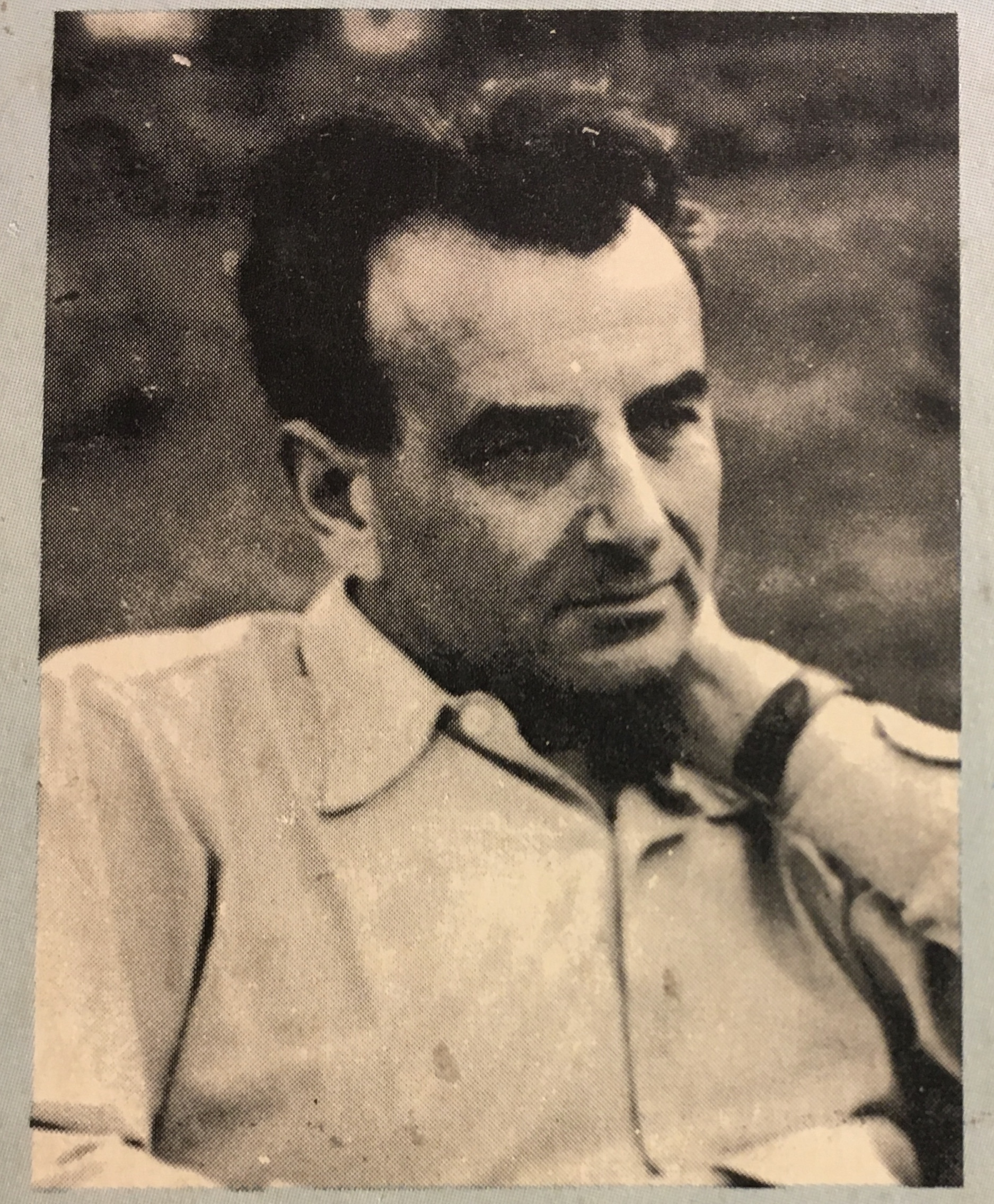
Jean Bruller, 1970

Jean Marcel Adolphe Bruller (26 February 1902 – 10 June 1991) was a French writer and illustrator who co-founded the publishing company Les Éditions de Minuit with Pierre de Lescure.

== Biography ==
Born to a Hungarian-Jewish father, Bruller joined the Resistance during the World War II occupation of northern France and his texts were published using the pseudonym Vercors (though he used this name for works published before the 1944 Battle of Vercors).

Several of his novels have fantasy or science fiction themes. The 1952 novel Les Animaux dénaturés (translated into English variously as You Shall Know Them, Borderline, and The Murder of the Missing Link) was made into the movie Skullduggery (1970) featuring Burt Reynolds and Susan Clark, and examines the question of what it means to be human.

Colères (translated into English as The Insurgents) is about the quest for immortality. In 1960 he published Sylva, a novel about a fox who becomes a woman, inspired by David Garnett's novel Lady into Fox (1922). The English-language version, translated by his wife Rita Barisse, was a finalist for the 1963 Hugo Award for Best Novel.

His historical novel Anne Boleyn (1985) presents a very intelligent Anne as having determinedly set about marrying Henry VIII of England in order to separate England from Papal power and strengthen England's independence.

== Bibliography ==
- Patapoufs et Filifers (Fattypuffs and Thinifers; illustrator only) (1930)
- Le Silence de la mer (The Silence of the Sea) (1942)
- Ce jour-là (1943)
- L'impuissance (1944)
- Le Cheval et la Mort (1944)
- Le Songe (1943)
- Les Armes de la nuit (1946)
- Les Yeux et la lumière (1948)
- La Puissance du jour (1951)
- Les Animaux dénaturés (1952)
- Colères (1956)
- Sur ce rivage, I – III (1958–60)
- Clémentine (1959)
- Sylva (1961)
- Quota ou les Pléthoriens (1966)
- Le Radeau de la Méduse (1969)
- Sillages (1972)
- Sept sentiers du désert (1972)
- Les Chevaux du temps (1977)
- Le Piège à loup (1979)
- Moi, Aristide Briand (1981)
- Anne Boleyn (Anne Boleyn: Forty Crucial Months in England's Evolution) (1985)

== Essays ==
- La Marche à l'étoile (1943)
- Souffrance de mon pays (1945)
- Portrait d'une amitié (1946)
- Plus ou moins homme (1948)
- Les pas dans le sable (1954)
- Les divagations d'un français en Chine (1956)
- P. P. C. Pour prendre congé (1957)
- La bataille du silence (1967)
- Questions sur la vie (1973)
- Tendre naufrage (1974)
- Ce que je crois (1975)
- Théâtre (1978)
