= List of films set in Paris =

Paris is a common setting in both French and American films. This is a list of films designed in Paris:

== French cinema ==
=== 1890s ===
- Excursion automobile Paris-Meulan (1896), by Auguste and Louis Lumière

=== 1910s ===
- Fantômas (1913), by Louis Feuillade
- Les Vampires (1915), by Louis Feuillade

=== 1920s ===
- Entr'acte (1924), by René Clair
- L'Inhumaine (1924), by Marcel L'Herbier
- Paris Qui Dort (1925), by René Clair
- Belphégor (1927), by Henri Desfontaines
- Napoléon (1927), by Abel Gance
- L'Argent (1928), by Marcel L'Herbier

=== 1930s ===
- Accusée, levez-vous ! (1930), by Maurice Tourneur
- Sous les toits de Paris (1930), by René Clair
- Allô Berlin ? Ici Paris ! (1931), by Julien Duvivier
- La Chienne (1931), by Jean Renoir
- Au nom de la loi (1932), by Maurice Tourneur
- Boudu sauvé des eaux (1932), by Jean Renoir
- La Petite Chocolatière (1932), by Marc Allégret
- Les Deux Orphelines (1933), by Maurice Tourneur
- L'Atalante (1934), by Jean Vigo
- La crise est finie (1934), by Robert Siodmak
- Mauvaise Graine (1934), by Billy Wilder and Alexander Esway
- Le Roi des Champs-Élysées (1934), by Yves Mirande
- Zouzou (1934), by Marc Allégret
- La Bandera (1935), by Julien Duvivier
- Les Mystères de Paris (1935), by Félix Gandéra
- Princesse Tam Tam (1935), by Edmond T. Gréville
- La belle équipe (1936), by Julien Duvivier
- Le roman d'un tricheur (1936), by Sacha Guitry
- Les Rois du sport (1937), by Pierre Colombier
- Hôtel du Nord (1938), by Marcel Carné
- La Maison du Maltais (1938), by Pierre Chenal
- Orage (1938), by Marc Allégret
- Remontons les Champs-Élysées (1938), by Sacha Guitry
- Derrière la façade (1939), by Georges Lacombe and Yves Mirande
- Fric-Frac (1939), by Maurice Lehmann and Claude Autant-Lara
- Le Jour se lève (1939), by Marcel Carné

=== 1940s ===
- Battement de coeur (1940), by Henri Decoin
- L'Assassin habite au 21 (1942), by Henri-Georges Clouzot
- La Nuit fantastique (1942), by Maurice L'Herbier
- Au Bonheur des Dames (1943), by André Cayatte
- Les Mystères de Paris (1943), by Jacques de Baroncelli
- Les dames du Bois de Boulogne (1945), by Robert Bresson
- Les Enfants du paradis (1945), by Marcel Carné
- Falbalas (1945), by Jacques Becker
- Les Portes de la nuit (1945), by Marcel Carné
- Antoine et Antoinette (1947), by Jacques Becker
- Par la fenêtre (1947), by Gilles Grangier
- Les Parents terrible (1947), by Jean Cocteau
- Quai des Orfèvres (1947), by Henri-Georges Clouzot
- Le Cœur sur la main (1949), by André Berthomieu
- Fantômas contre Fantômas (1949), by Robert Vernay
- Manon (1949), by Henri-Georges Clouzot
- Orphée (1949), by Jean Cocteau
- Rendez-vous de juillet (1949), by Jacques Becker

=== 1950s ===
==== 1951 ====
- Les Enfants Terribles, by Jean-Pierre Melville
- Garou-Garou, le passe-muraille, by Jean Boyer
- La Poison, by Sacha Guitry
- ...Sans laisser d'adresse, by Jean-Paul Le Chanois
- Seul dans Paris, by Hervé Bromberger
- Sous le ciel de Paris, by Julien Duvivier

==== 1952 ====
- C'est arrivé à Paris, by Henri Lavorel and John Berry
- Casque d'or, by Jacques Becker
- La Fête à Henriette, by Julien Duvivier
- Monsieur Taxi, by André Hunebelle

==== 1953 ====
- Bonjour Paris !, by Jean Image
- Madame de..., by Max Ophüls
- Minuit quai de Bercy, by Christian Stengel

==== 1954 ====
- L'Air de Paris, by Marcel Carné
- Crainquebille, by Ralph Habib
- French Cancan, by Jean Renoir

==== 1955 ====
- Les Chiffonniers d'Emmaüs, by Robert Darène
- Du rififi chez les hommes, by Jules Dassin
- Le Fil à la patte, by Guy Lefranc
- Razzia sur la chnouf, by Henri Decoin
- Sophie et le crime, by Pierre Gaspard-Huit

==== 1956 ====
- The Red Balloon, by Albert Lamorisse
- Bob le flambeur, by Jean-Pierre Melville
- Ce soir les jupons volent, by Dimitri Kirsanoff
- Gervaise, by René Clément
- Notre-Dame de Paris, by Jean Delannoy
- Paris, Palace Hôtel, by Henri Verneuil
- Si Paris nous était conté, by Sacha Guitry
- La Traversée de Paris, by Claude Autant-Lara
- Voici le temps des assassins, by Julien Duvivier

==== 1957 ====
- Pot-Bouille, by Julien Duvivier

==== 1958 ====
- Les Amants, by Louis Malle
- Ascenseur pour l'échafaud, by Louis Malle
- En cas de malheur, by Claude Autant-Lara
- Les Misérables, by Jean-Paul Le Chanois
- Mon Oncle, by Jacques Tati
- Sois belle et tais-toi, by Marc Allégret
- Young Sinners (Les Tricheurs), by Marcel Carné

==== 1959 ====
- 125, rue Montmartre, by Gilles Grangier
- Marie-Octobre, by Julien Duvivier
- Pickpocket, by Robert Bresson
- Les Quatre Cents Coups, by François Truffaut

=== 1960s ===
==== 1960 ====
- À bout de souffle, by Jean-Luc Godard
- Le Capitan, by André Hunebelle
- Les Héritiers, by Jean Laviron
- Le huitième jour, by Marcel Hanoun
- Pierrot la tendresse, by François Villiers
- Tirez sur le pianiste, by François Truffaut
- La Vérité, by Henri-Georges Clouzot
- Le Voyage en ballon, by Albert Lamorisse
- Zazie dans le métro, by Louis Malle

==== 1961 ====
- Le Capitaine Fracasse, by Pierre Gaspard-Huit
- Une femme est une femme, by Jean-Luc Godard
- Paris nous appartient, by Jacques Rivette

==== 1962 ====
- Adieu Philippine, by Jacques Rozier
- Cléo de 5 à 7, by Agnès Varda
- Jules and Jim, by François Truffaut
- Les Mystères de Paris, by André Hunebelle
- Pourquoi Paris ?, by Denys de la Patellière
- Vie privée, by Louis Malle
- Vivre sa vie, by Jean-Luc Godard

==== 1963 ====
- À cause, à cause d'une femme, by Michel Deville
- Dragées au poivre, by Jacques Baratier
- Peau de banane, by Marcel Ophüls

==== 1964 ====
- Cherchez l'idole, by Michel Boisrond
- Fantômas, by André Hunebelle
- Un gosse de la butte, by Maurice Delbez
- Lucky Jo, by Michel Deville
- Monsieur, by Jean-Paul Le Chanois
- La Peau Douce, by François Truffaut
- Thomas l'imposteur, by Georges Franju
- Bande à part by Jean-Luc Godard

==== 1965 ====
- Alphaville: Une étrange aventure de Lemmy Caution, by Jean-Luc Godard
- L'Amour à la mer, by Guy Gilles
- Compartiment tueurs, by Costa-Gavras
- Le Corniaud, by Gérard Oury
- Les Deux Orphelines, by Riccardo Freda
- Du rififi à Paname, by Denys de La Patellière
- Fantômas se déchaîne, by André Hunebelle
- La Grosse Caisse, by Alex Joffé
- La jetée, by Chris Marker
- Paris vu par..., Anthology film
- Pierrot le fou, by Jean-Luc Godard
- Rapture by John Guillermin

==== 1966 ====
- La Grande Vadrouille, by Gérard Oury
- La guerre est finie, by Alain Resnais
- Masculin, féminin, by Jean-Luc Godard
- Paris brûle-t-il?, by René Clément

==== 1967 ====
- Belle de jour, by Luis Buñuel
- La Chinoise, by Jean-Luc Godard
- Play Time, by Jacques Tati
- Sept fois femme, by Vittorio De Sica
- Le voleur, by Louis Malle

==== 1968 ====
- Baisers volés, by François Truffaut
- Les Biches, by Claude Chabrol
- La Blonde de Pékin, by Nicolas Gessner
- Darling Caroline, by Denys de La Patellière

==== 1969 ====
- L'Armée des ombres, by Jean-Pierre Melville
- Le Cerveau, by Gérard Oury
- Le Clan des Siciliens, by Henri Verneuil

=== 1970s ===
==== 1970 ====
- Le Cercle rouge, by Jean-Pierre Melville
- Domicile Conjugal, by François Truffaut
- La Liberté en croupe, by Édouard Molinaro

==== 1971 ====
- Les Amis, by Gérard Blain
- Le Bateau sur l'herbe, by Gérard Brach
- Les Deux Anglaises et le Continent, by François Truffaut

==== 1972 ====
- Le Grand Blond avec une chaussure noire, by Yves Robert

==== 1973 ====
- Les Aventures de Rabbi Jacob, by Gérard Oury
- Le Magnifique, by Philippe de Broca
- La Maman et la Putain, by Jean Eustache
- Prêtres interdits, by Denys de La Patellière

==== 1974 ====
- Céline et Julie vont en bateau, by Jacques Rivette
- Les Chinois à Paris, by Jean Yanne
- Les Guichets du Louvre, by Michel Mitrani
- Stavisky, by Alain Resnais
- Touche pas à la femme blanche !, by Marco Ferreri

==== 1975 ====
- Daguerréotypes, by Agnès Varda
- Les Ambassadeurs, by Naceur Ktari
- Peur sur la ville, by Henri Verneuil

==== 1976 ====
- L'aile ou la cuisse, by Claude Zidi
- C'était un rendez-vous by Claude Lelouch
- Un éléphant ça trompe énormément, by Yves Robert

==== 1977 ====
- La Vie devant soi, by Moshé Mizrahi

==== 1978 ====
- La Carapate, by Gérard Oury
- Lady Oscar, by Jacques Demy
- Tendre poulet, by Philippe de Broca
- Violette Nozière, by Claude Chabrol

==== 1979 ====
- L'amour en fuite, by François Truffaut
- Clair de femme, by Costa-Gavras

=== 1980s ===
==== 1980 ====
- La Boum, by Claude Pinoteau
- Le Coup du parapluie, by Gérard Oury
- Le Dernier Métro, by François Truffaut
- Diva, by Jean-Jacques Beineix
- La Femme de l'aviateur, by Éric Rohmer
- Inspecteur la Bavure, by Claude Zidi
- Les Sous-doués, by Claude Zidi

==== 1981 ====
- Une étrange affaire, by Pierre Granier-Deferre
- Le Pont du Nord, by Jacques Rivette
- Le Professionnel, by Georges Lautner
- Les Sous-doués en vacances, by Claude Zidi

==== 1982 ====
- La Balance, by Bob Swaim
- La Boum 2, by Claude Pinoteau
- Les Misérables, by Robert Hossein
- La Nuit de Varennes, by Ettore Scola
- La Passante du Sans-Souci, by Jacques Rouffio
- Tout feu, tout flamme, by Jean-Paul Rappeneau

==== 1983 ====
- Banzaï, by Claude Zidi
- Danton, by Andrzej Wajda
- Le Marginal, by Jacques Deray
- À nos amours, by Maurice Pialat
- Signes extérieurs de richesse, by Jacques Monnet
- Tchao Pantin, by Claude Berri

==== 1984 ====
- Marche à l'ombre, by Michel Blanc
- Mesrine, by André Génovès
- Les Nuits de la pleine lune, by Eric Rohmer
- Paroles et musique, by Elie Chouraqui
- Pinot simple flic, by Gérard Jugnot
- Les Ripoux, by Claude Zidi
- Le Sang des autres, by Claude Chabrol
- Souvenirs, souvenirs, by Ariel Zeitoun

==== 1985 ====
- A nous les garçons, by Michel Lang
- Rendez-vous, by André Téchiné
- Scout toujours..., by Gérard Jugnot
- Subway, by Luc Besson
- Trois hommes et un couffin, by Coline Serreau

==== 1986 ====
- Autour de minuit, by Bertrand Tavernier
- Mélo, by Alain Resnais
- Nuit d'ivresse, by Bernard Nauer

==== 1987 ====
- Lévy et Goliath, by Gérard Oury
- Urgences, by Raymond Depardon

==== 1988 ====
- Fréquence meurtre, by Élisabeth Rappeneau
- Itinéraire d'un enfant gâté, by Claude Lelouch
- La vie est un long fleuve tranquille (1988), by Étienne Chatiliez

==== 1989 ====
- I Want to Go Home, by Alain Resnais
- Love Without Pity, by Éric Rochant
- La Révolution française, by Robert Enrico and Richard T. Heffron
- My New Partner II, by Claude Zidi
- L'union sacrée, by Alexandre Arcady

=== 1990s ===
==== 1990 ====
- Cyrano de Bergerac, by Jean-Paul Rappeneau
- La Discrète, by Christian Vincent
- La Femme Nikita, by Luc Besson
- Tatie Danielle, by Étienne Chatiliez

==== 1991 ====
- Les Amants du Pont-Neuf, by Leos Carax
- La double vie de Véronique, by Krzysztof Kieslowski
- Une époque formidable, by Gérard Jugnot
- J'embrasse pas, by André Téchiné
- L'Opération Corned-Beef, by Jean-Marie Poiré
- Paris Awakens, by Olivier Assayas
- La Totale!, by Claude Zidi

==== 1992 ====
- Un cœur en hiver, by Claude Sautet
- L. 627, by Bertrand Tavernier
- Les Nuits fauves, by Cyril Collard

==== 1993 ====
- Trois Couleurs : Bleu, by Krzysztof Kieslowski

==== 1994 ====
- Bonsoir, by Jean-Pierre Mocky
- Grosse Fatigue, by Michel Blanc
- L'Histoire du garçon qui voulait qu'on l'embrasse, by Philippe Harel
- Un indien dans la ville, by Hervé Palud
- Le Péril jeune, by Cédric Klapisch
- La Reine Margot, by Patrice Chéreau

==== 1995 ====
- Les Anges gardiens, by Jean-Marie Poiré
- La Fille seule, by Benoît Jacquot
- La Haine, by Mathieu Kassovitz
- Haut bas fragile, by Jacques Rivette
- Les Trois Frères, by Didier Bourdon and Bernard Campan.

==== 1996 ====
- L'Appartement, by Gilles Mimouni
- Beaumarchais, l'insolent, by Édouard Molinaro
- La Belle Verte, by Coline Serreau
- Chacun cherche son chat, by Cédric Klapisch
- Le Fils de Gascogne, by Pascal Aubier
- Le Jaguar, by Francis Veber
- Pédale douce, by Gabriel Aghion
- Salut cousin !, by Merzak Allouache

==== 1997 ====
- Le Cousin, by Alain Corneau
- Le Dîner de Cons, by Francis Veber
- Dobermann, by Jan Kounen
- Jeunesse, by Noël Alpi
- On connaît la chanson, by Alain Resnais
- Le Pari, by Didier Bourdon and Bernard Campan
- Quatre Garçons pleins d'avenir Jean-Paul, by Jean-Paul Lilienfeld
- Soleil, by Roger Hanin
- La Vérité si je mens!, by Thomas Gilou

==== 1998 ====
- Didier, by Alain Chabat
- L'École de la chair, by Benoît Jacquot
- L'Ennui, by Alberto Moravia
- Louise (Take 2), by Siegfried
- Place Vendôme, by Nicole Garcia
- Vénus Beauté (Institut), by Tonie Marshall
- Vive la mariée... et la libération du Kurdistan, by Hiner Saleem

==== 1999 ====
- La Fille sur le pont, by Patrice Leconte
- Peut-être, by Cédric Klapisch
- La Bûche, by Danièle Thompson
- La vie ne me fait pas peur, by Noémie Lvovsky

=== 2000s ===
==== 2000 ====
- 30 ans, by Laurent Perrin
- Code inconnu : Récit incomplet de divers voyages, by Michael Haneke
- Cours toujours, by Dante Desarthe
- Deuxième vie, by Patrick Braoudé
- Le goût des autres, by Agnès Jaoui
- Sous le sable, by François Ozon
- Taxi 2, by Gérard Krawczyk
- La Tour Montparnasse infernale, by Charles Némès

==== 2001 ====
- Absolument fabuleux, by Gabriel Aghion
- Chaos, by Colinne Serreau
- La Chambre des officiers, by François Dupeyron
- Le Doux Amour des hommes, by Jean-Paul Civeyrac
- Le Fabuleux Destin d'Amélie Poulain by Jean-Pierre Jeunet
- Le Placard, by Francis Veber
- Les Rois mages, by Didier Bourdon
- Va savoir, by Jacques Rivette
- Sur mes lèvres, by Jacques Audiard
- Tanguy, by Étienne Chatiliez
- La Vérité si je mens ! 2, by Thomas Gilou
- Vidocq, by Pitof
- Wasabi, by Gérard Krawczyk
- Yamakasi, by Ariel Zeitoun and Julien Seri

==== 2002 ====
- Ah! Si j'étais riche, by Gérard Bitton and Michel Munz
- Une affaire privée, by Guillaume Nicloux
- Le Boulet, by Alain Berbérian and Frédéric Forestier
- Demonlover, by Olivier Assayas
- À la folie... pas du tout, by Laetitia Colombani
- La Guerre à Paris, by Yolande Zauberman
- Irréversible, by Gaspar Noé
- Décalage Horaire, by Danièle Thompson
- Ma femme s'appelle Maurice, Jean-Marie Poiré
- Mauvais esprit, by Patrick Alessandrin
- La Mentale, by Boursinhac
- Monsieur Batignole, by Gérard Jugnot
- Le Nouveau Jean-Claude, by Didier Tronchet
- Papillons de nuit, by John Pepper
- Vendredi soir, by Claire Denis

==== 2003 ====
- 18 ans après, by Coline Serreau
- 7 ans de mariage, by Didier Bourdon
- Le Bison (et sa voisine Dorine), by Isabelle Nanty
- Bon voyage, by Jean-Paul Rappeneau
- Chouchou, by Merzak Allouache
- Filles uniques, by Pierre Jolivet
- Histoire de Marie et Julien, by Jacques Rivette
- Laisse tes mains sur mes hanches, by Chantal Lauby
- Monsieur Ibrahim et les Fleurs du Coran, by François Dupeyron
- Pars vite et reviens tard, by Régis Wargnier
- Ripoux 3, by Claude Zidi
- Rire et Châtiment, by Isabelle Doval
- Son frère, by Patrice Chéreau
- Tais-toi !, by Francis Veber
- Toutes ces belles promesses, by Jean-Paul Civeyrac
- The Triplets of Belleville (Les Triplettes de Belleville), by Sylvain Chomet

==== 2004 ====
- 36 Quai des Orfèvres, by Olivier Marchal
- Agents secrets, by Frédéric Schoendoerffer
- Arsène Lupin, by Jean-Paul Salomé
- L'Esquive, by Abdellatif Kechiche
- L'Incruste, by Alexandre Castagnetti and Corentin Julius
- Un long dimanche de fiançailles, by Jean-Pierre Jeunet
- Mensonges et trahisons et plus si affinités..., by Laurent Tirard
- Nathalie..., by Anne Fontaine
- Les Parisiens, by Claude Lelouch
- Pédale dure, by Gabriel Aghion
- Triple Agent, by Eric Rohmer
- Une vie à t'attendre, by Thierry Klifa

==== 2005 ====
- Angel-A, by Luc Besson
- Les Amants réguliers, by Philippe Garrel
- Anthony Zimmer, by Jérôme Salle
- The Art of Breaking Up, by Michel Deville
- Une aventure, by Xavier Giannoli
- Babel el web, by Merzak Allouache
- De battre mon cœur s'est arrêté, by Jacques Audiard
- La Boîte noire, by Richard Berry
- Caché, by Michael Haneke
- Combien tu m'aimes?, by Bertrand Blier
- Le courage d'aimer, by Claude Lelouch
- L'Empire des loups, by Chris Nahon
- Gabrielle, by Patrice Chéreau
- Gentille, by Sophie Fillières
- The Moustache, by Emmanuel Carrère
- Les Parrains, by Frédéric Forestier
- Le Petit Lieutenant, by Xavier Beauvois
- Les Poupées Russes, by Cédric Klapisch
- Le Promeneur du Champ de Mars, by Robert Guédiguian
- L'un reste, l'autre part, by Claude Berri
- Sauf le respect que je vous dois, by Fabienne Godet
- Tout pour plaire, by Cécile Telerman
- À travers la forêt, by Jean-Paul Civeyrac

==== 2006 ====
- Les Amants du Flore, by Ilan Duran Cohen
- Les Brigades du Tigre, by Jérôme Cornuau
- Cabaret Paradis, by Shirley & Dino
- Coeurs, by Alain Resnais
- Dans Paris, by Christophe Honoré
- La Doublure, by Francis Veber
- Fauteuils d'orchestre, by Danièle Thompson
- Il est plus facile pour un chameau..., by Valeria Bruni Tedeschi
- Je pense à vous, by Pascal Bonitzer
- Jean-Philippe, by Laurent Tuel
- L'Ivresse du pouvoir, by Claude Chabrol
- Mon meilleur ami, by Patrice Leconte
- Ne le dis à personne, by Guillaume Canet
- Prête-moi ta main, by Eric Lartigau
- Renaissance, Christian Volckman
- Le Sable, by Mario Feroce
- La Science des rêves, by Michel Gondry

==== 2007 ====
- 99 Francs, by Jan Kounen
- Un baiser s'il vous plaît, by Emmanuel Mouret
- Boarding Gate, by Olivier Assayas
- Les Chansons d'amour, by Christophe Honoré
- Le Deuxième Souffle, by Alain Corneau
- Dialogue avec mon jardinier, by Jean Becker
- Ensemble, c'est tout, by Claude Berri
- Molière, by Laurent Tirard
- La Môme, by Olivier Dahan
- Paris, by Cédric Klapisch
- Le Prix à payer, by Alexandra Leclère
- Roman de Gare, by Claude Lelouch
- Les Toits de Paris, by Hiner Saleem
- Une vieille maîtresse, by Catherine Breillat

==== 2008 ====
- Agathe Cléry, by Etienne Chatiliez
- Bouquet final, by Michel Delgado
- De l'autre côté du lit, by Pascale Pouzadoux
- Entre les murs, by Laurent Cantet
- Faubourg 36, by Christophe Barratier
- LOL (Laughing Out Loud), by Lisa Alessandrin
- Mesrine : L'instinct de mort / L'ennemi public n°1, by Jean-François Richet
- Modern Love, by Stéphane Kazandjia
- Les plages d'Agnès, by Agnès Varda
- Le Plaisir de chanter, by Ilan Duran Cohen
- Sagan, by Diane Kurys
- Seuls Two, by Ramzy Bédia and Éric Judor
- Le Transporteur 3, by Olivier Megaton
- Le Voyage du ballon rouge, by Hou Hsiao-hsien

==== 2009 ====
- Une affaire d'État, by Éric Valete
- Le Bal des actrices, by Maiwenn Le Besco
- Banlieue 13 – Ultimatum, by Patrick Alessandrin
- Coco avant Chanel, by Anne Fontaine
- Coco Chanel & Igor Stravinsky, by Jan Kounen
- Commis d'office, by Hannelore Cayre
- Le Concert, by Radu Mihaileanu
- Eden à l'ouest, by Costa-Gavras
- Fais-moi plaisir !, by Emmanuel Mouret
- La Folle Histoire d'amour de Simon Eskenazy, by Jean-Jacques Zilbermann
- Les Herbes folles, by Alain Resnais
- Le Hérisson, by Mona Achache
- La horde, by Benjamin Rocher and Yannick Dahan
- Micmacs à tire-larigot, by Jean-Pierre Jeunet
- Le Petit Nicolas, by Laurent Tirard
- Un Prophète, by Jacques Audiard
- Une semaine sur deux (et la moitié des vacances scolaires), by Ivan Calbérac
- R.T.T., by Frédéric Berthe
- Rapt, by Lucas Belvaux

=== 2010 ===
==== 2010 ====
- L'amour c'est mieux à deux, by Arnaud Lemort and Dominique Farrugia
- Bus Palladium, by Christopher Thompson
- The Extraordinary Adventures of Adèle Blanc-Sec, by Luc Besson
- Gainsbourg (vie héroïque), by Joann Sfar
- L'Illusionniste, by Sylvain Chomet
- L'Immortel, by Richard Berry
- Le Nom des gens, by Michel Leclerc
- La Rafle, by Roselyne Bosch
- Tout ce qui brille, by Géraldine Nakache and Hervé Mimran

==== 2011 ====
- L'Apollonide: Souvenirs de la maison close, by Bertrand Bonello
- Les Bien-Aimés, by Christophe Honoré
- La Délicatesse, by Stéphane Foenkinos and David Foenkinos
- La femme du Vème, by Paweł Pawlikowski
- La guerre est déclarée, by Valérie Donzelli
- Intouchables, by Olivier Nakache and Éric Toledano
- Un Monstre a Paris, by Bibo Bergeron
- Omar m'a tuer, by Roschdy Zem
- Polisse, by Maïwenn
- Les Trois Pères, by Didier Bourdon and Bernard Campan

==== 2012 ====
- Cloclo, by Florent Emilio Siri
- Les Infidèles, by Emmanuelle Bercot, Michel Hazanavicius, Jean Dujardin and Gilles Lellouche
- JC comme Jésus Christ, by Jonathan Zaccaï
- La Vérité si je mens ! 3, by Thomas Gilou
- Holy Motors, by Leos Carax

==== 2014 ====
- Eden by Mia Hansen-Løve

==== 2017 ====
- BPM (Beats per Minute) by Robin Campillo

=== 2020s ===
==== 2021 ====
- Paris, 13th District by Jacques Audiard

==== 2023 ====
- Asterix & Obelix: The Middle Kingdom by Guillaume Canet

==== 2024 ====
- Dear Paris by Marjane Satrapi

== Foreign films set entirely or partially in Paris ==
=== 1910s ===
- The Darling of Paris (1917), by J. Gordon Edwards

=== 1920s ===
- Camille (1921), by Ray C. Smallwood
- The Four Horsemen of the Apocalypse (1921), by Rex Ingram
- Orphans of the Storm (1921), by D.W. Griffith
- Peacock Alley (1921), by Robert Z. Leonard
- The Three Musketeers (1921), by Fred Niblo
- Esmeralda (1922), by Edwin J. Collins
- The Hunchback of Notre Dame (1923), by Wallace Worsley
- A Woman of Paris (1923), by Charlie Chaplin
- The Merry Widow (1923), by Erich von Stroheim
- The Phantom of the Opera (1925), by Rupert Julian
- La Bohème (1926), by King Vidor
- Paris (1926), by Edmund Goulding
- The Temptress (1926), by Fred Niblo
- Seventh Heaven (1927), by Frank Borzage
- The Iron Mask (1929), by Allan Dwan
- Paris (1929), by Clarence G. Badger

=== 1930s ===
- Half Shot at Sunrise (1930), by Paul Sloane
- Inspiration (1931), by Clarence Brown
- The Last Flight (1931), by William Dieterle
- Man of the World (1931), by Richard Wallace
- Mata Hari (1931), by George Fitzmaurice
- The Phantom of Paris (1931), by John S. Robertson
- Seed (1931), by John M. Stahl
- Arsène Lupin (1932), by Jack Conway
- Love Me Tonight (1932), by Rouben Mamoulian
- Murders in the Rue Morgue (1932), by Robert Florey
- One Hour with You (1932), by George Cukor and Ernst Lubitsch
- The Passionate Plumber (1932), by Edward Sedgwick
- Trouble in Paradise (1932), by Ernst Lubitsch
- A Bedtime Story (1933), by Norman Taurog
- Design for Living (1933), by Ernst Lubitsch
- Bolero (1934), by Wesley Ruggles
- The Count of Monte Cristo, by Rowland V. Lee
- Fashions of 1934 (1934), by William Dieterle
- The Merry Widow (1934), by Ernst Lubitsch
- Folies Bergère de Paris (1935), by Roy Del Ruth
- Mad Love (1935), by Karl Freund
- Peter Ibbetson (1935), by Henry Hathaway
- Roberta (1935), by William A. Seiter
- Ruggles of Red Gap (1935), by Leo McCarey
- A Tale of Two Cities (1935), by Jack Conway
- The Three Musketeers (1935), by Rowland V. Lee
- Desire (1936), by Frank Borzage
- The Devil-Doll (1936), by Tod Browning
- Camille (1936), by George Cukor
- The Story of Louis Pasteur (1936), by William Dieterle
- Angel (1937), by Ernst Lubitsch
- Café Metropole (1937), by Edward H. Griffith
- I Met Him in Paris (1937), by Wesley Ruggles
- The Life of Emile Zola (1937), by William Dieterle
- Stolen Holiday (1937), by Michael Curtiz
- Tovarich (1937), by Anatole Litvak
- Mad About Music (1938), by Norman Taurog
- The Flying Deuces (1939), by A. Edward Sutherland
- The Hunchback of Notre Dame (1939), by William Dieterle
- The Man in the Iron Mask (1939), by James Whale
- Midnight (1939), by Mitchell Leisen
- Ninotchka (1939), by Ernst Lubitsch
- The Story of Vernon and Irene Castle (1939), by H. C. Potter
- Zaza (1939), by George Cukor

=== 1940s ===
- Arise, My Love (1940), by Mitchell Leisen
- Ohm Krüger (1941), by Hans Steinhoff
- Casablanca (1942), by Michael Curtiz
- Joan of Paris (1942), by Robert Stevenson
- Once Upon a Honeymoon (1942), by Leo McCarey
- Reunion in France (1942), by Jules Dassin
- Madame Curie (1943), by Mervyn LeRoy
- Phantom of the Opera (1943), by Arthur Lubin
- Bluebeard (1944), by Edgar G. Ulmer
- A Song to Remember (1945), by Charles Vidor
- A Scandal in Paris (1946), by Douglas Sirk
- Berlin Express (1947), by Jacques Tourneur
- The Private Affairs of Bel Ami (1947), by Albert Lewin
- Arch of Triumph (1948), by Lewis Milestone
- The Three Musketeers (1948), by George Sidney
- Reign of Terror (1949), by Anthony Mann

=== 1950s ===
- An American in Paris (1951), by Vincente Minnelli
- The Lavender Hill Mob (1951), by Charles Crichton
- Rich, Young and Pretty (1951), by Norman Taurog
- April in Paris (1952), by David Butler
- Lovely to Look At (1952), by Mervyn LeRoy
- The Merry Widow (1952), by Curtis Bernhardt
- Les Misérables (1952), by Lewis Milestone
- Monte Carlo Baby (1952), by Jean Boyer
- Moulin Rouge (1952), by John Huston
- Scaramouche (1952), by George Sidney
- Act of Love (1953), by Anatole Litvak
- Innocents in Paris (1953), by Gordon Parry
- Little Boy Lost (1953), by George Seaton
- Daddy Long Legs (1954), by Jean Negulesco
- Désirée (1954), by Henry Koster
- The French Line (1954), by Lloyd Bacon
- The Last Time I Saw Paris (1954), by Richard Brooks
- Phantom of the Rue Morgue (1954), by Roy Del Ruth
- Sabrina (1954), by Billy Wilder
- The French, They Are a Funny Race (1955), by Preston Sturges
- So This Is Paris (1955), by Richard Quine
- Anything Goes (1956), by Robert Lewis
- Trapeze (1956), by Carol Reed
- Funny Face (1957), by Stanley Donen
- Love From Paris (1957), by Helmut Käutner
- Love in the Afternoon (1957), by Billy Wilder
- Silk Stockings (1957), by Rouben Mamoulian
- The Sun Also Rises (1957), by Henry King
- A Certain Smile (1958), by Jean Negulesco
- Gigi (1958), by Vincente Minnelli
- Paris Holiday (1958), by Gerd Oswald
- The Perfect Furlough (1958), by Blake Edwards

=== 1960s ===
- Can-Can (1960), by Walter Lang
- Goodbye Again (1961), by Anatole Litvak
- Paris Blues (1961), by Martin Ritt
- Four Horsemen of the Apocalypse (1962), by Vincente Minnelli
- Gay Purr-ee (1962), by Abe Levitow
- Gigot (1962), by Gene Kelly
- Charade (1963), by Stanley Donen
- A New Kind of Love (1963), by Melville Shavelson
- The Pink Panther (1963), by Blake Edwards
- Take Her, She's Mine (1963), by Henry Koster
- Paris When It Sizzles (1964), by Richard Quine
- A Shot in the Dark (1964), by Blake Edwards
- What a Way to Go! (1964), by J. Lee Thompson
- Boeing Boeing (1965), by John Rich
- The Great Race (1965), by Blake Edwards
- Thunderball (1965) by Terence Young
- What's New Pussycat? (1965), by Clive Donner and Richard Talmadge
- How to Steal a Million (1966), by William Wyler
- Made in Paris (1966), by Boris Sagal
- Caprice (1967), by Frank Tashlin
- The Night of the Generals (1967), by Anatole Litvak
- Woman Times Seven (1967), by Vittorio De Sica
- Destroy All Monsters (1968), by Yoshio Tsuchiya
- The Madwoman of Chaillot (1968), by Bryan Forbes

=== 1970s ===
- The Aristocats (1970), by Wolfgang Reitherman
- Darling Lili (1970), by Blake Edwards
- Start the Revolution Without Me (1970), by Bud Yorkin
- Tropic of Cancer (1970), by Joseph Strick
- Murders in the Rue Morgue (1971), by Gordon Hessler
- Paris and Love (1972), by Mohamed Salman
- Last Tango in Paris (1972), by Bernardo Bertolucci
- Travels with My Aunt (1972), by George Cukor
- The Day of the Jackal (1973), by Fred Zinnemann
- Scorpio (1973), by Michael Winner
- The Three Musketeers (1973), by Richard Lester
- Two People (1973), by Robert Wise
- Céline and Julie Go Boating by Jacques
- The Pink Panther Strikes Again (1976), by Blake Edwards
- Marathon Man (1976), by John Schlesinger
- The American Friend (1977), by Wim Wenders
- Herbie Goes to Monte Carlo (1977), by Vincent McEveety
- Who Is Killing the Great Chefs of Europe? (1978), by Ted Kotcheff
- Bloodline (1979), by Terence Young
- A Little Romance (1979), by George Roy Hill

=== 1980s ===
- Bon Voyage, Charlie Brown (and Don't Come Back!!) (1980), by Charles M. Schulz
- Superman II (1980), by Richard Donner & Richard Lester
- Condorman (1981), by Charles Jarrott
- Lenin in Paris (1981), by Sergei Yutkevich
- Trail of the Pink Panther (1982), by Blake Edwards
- Victor Victoria (1982), by Blake Edwards
- Curse of the Pink Panther (1983), by Blake Edwards
- La Traviata (1983), by Franco Zeffirelli
- American Dreamer (1984), by Rick Rosenthal
- National Lampoon's European Vacation, (1985), by Amy Heckerling
- Target (1985), by Arthur Penn
- A View to a Kill (1985), by John Glen
- Round Midnight (1986), by Bertrand Tavernier
- Dangerous Liaisons (1988), by Stephen Frears
- Frantic (1988), by Roman Polanski
- The Moderns (1988), by Alan Rudolph
- Sweet Lies (1988), by Robert Palmer

=== 1990s ===
- Henry & June (1990), by Philip Kaufman
- The Favour, the Watch and the Very Big Fish (1991), by Ben Lewin
- Night on Earth (1991), by Jim Jarmusch
- Bitter Moon (1992), by Roman Polanski
- Window To Paris (1993), by Yuri Mamin
- Killing Zoe (1994), by Roger Avary
- Prêt-à-Porter (1994), by Robert Altman
- Delta of Venus (1995), by Zalman King
- Forget Paris (1995), by Billy Crystal
- French Kiss (1995), by Lawrence Kasdan
- Jefferson in Paris (1995), by James Ivory
- Sabrina (1995), by Sydney Pollack
- Surviving Picasso (1995), by James Ivory
- Total Eclipse (1995), by Agnieszka Holland
- La Buena vida (1996), by David Trueba
- Everyone Says I Love You (1996), by Woody Allen
- The Hunchback of Notre Dame (1996), by Gary Trousdale & Kirk Wise
- An American Werewolf in Paris (1997), by Anthony Waller
- Anastasia (1997), by Don Bluth and Gary Goldman
- Love in Paris (1997), by Anne Goursaud
- Metroland (1997), by Philip Saville
- Deep Impact (1998), by Mimi Leder
- Ronin (1998), by John Frankenheimer
- Madeline (1998), by Daisy von Scherler Mayer
- The Man in the Iron Mask (1998), by Randall Wallace
- The Ninth Gate (1999), by Roman Polanski
- Passport to Paris (1999), by Alan Metter

=== 2000s ===
==== 2000 ====
- 102 Dalmatians, by Kevin Lima
- Final Destination, by James Wong
- Rugrats in Paris: The Movie, by Stig Bergqvist and Paul Demeyer

==== 2001 ====
- Monsters, Inc. by Pete Docter
- CQ, by Roman Coppola
- The Emperor's New Clothes, by Alan Taylor
- Kiss of the Dragon, by Chris Nahon
- Moulin Rouge!, by Baz Luhrmann

==== 2002 ====
- The Bourne Identity, by Doug Liman
- Femme Fatale, by Brian De Palma
- The Hunchback of Notre Dame II, by Bradley Raymond
- The Truth About Charlie, by Jonathan Demme

==== 2003 ====
- Remake, by Dino Mustafić
- Le Divorce, by James Ivory
- Les Innocents, by Bernardo Bertolucci
- Looney Tunes: Back in Action, by Joe Dante
- Final Destination 2, by David Richard Ellis
- Something's Gotta Give, by Nancy Meyers
- Winged Migration, by Jacques Perrin

==== 2004 ====
- Before Sunset, by Richard Linklater
- Devil Man, by Hisato Izaki
- Eurotrip, by Jeff Schaffer
- Godzilla: Final Wars, by Ryuhei Kitamura
- Flyboys, by Tony Bill
- Head in the Clouds, by John Duigan
- Hum Tum, by Kunal Kohli
- The Phantom of the Opera, by Joel Schumacher
- Team America: World Police, by Trey Parker

==== 2005 ====
- Deuce Bigalow: European Gigolo, by Mike Bigelow
- Munich, by Steven Spielberg
- Ninette, by José Luis Garci

==== 2006 ====
- The Da Vinci Code, by Ron Howard
- The Devil Wears Prada, by David Frankel
- Don: The Chase Begins Again, by Farhan Akhtar
- Französisch für Anfänger, by Christian Ditter
- Marie Antoinette, by Sofia Coppola
- Paris, je t'aime, anthology film
- Perfume: The Story of a Murderer, by Tom Tykwer
- The Pink Panther, by Shawn Levy

==== 2007 ====
- 2 Days in Paris, by Julie Delpy
- The Bourne Ultimatum, by Paul Greengrass
- Broken English, by Zoe Cassavetes
- Chill Out, Scooby-Doo!, by Joe Sichta
- Jhoom Barabar Jhoom, by Shaad Ali
- Mr. Bean's Holiday, by Steve Bendelack
- National Treasure: Book of Secrets, by Jon Turteltaub
- Ratatouille, by Brad Bird
- Rush Hour 3, by Brett Ratner

==== 2008 ====
- Disaster Movie, by Jason Friedberg and Aaron Seltzer
- Taken, by Pierre Morel

==== 2009 ====
- Cheri, by Stephen Frears
- An Education, by Lone Scherfig
- G.I. Joe: The Rise of Cobra, by Stephen Sommers
- Inglourious Basterds, by Quentin Tarantino
- Julie & Julia, by Nora Ephron
- Nodame Cantabile, by Hideki Takeuchi and Taisuke Kawamura
- The Pink Panther 2, by Harald Zwart

=== 2010s ===
==== 2010 ====
- The Absinthe Drinkers, by John Charles Jopson
- From Paris with Love, by Pierre Morel
- Hereafter, by Clint Eastwood
- Inception, by Christopher Nolan
- The Tourist, by Florian Henckel von Donnersmarck

==== 2011 ====
- After Fall, Winter, by Eric Schaeffer
- Bitch, by Lou Ye
- Cars 2, by John Lasseter
- Engeyum Kaadhal, by Prabhu Deva
- Final Destination 5, by Steven Quale
- For Lovers Only, by Michael Polish and Mark Polish
- Hugo, by Martin Scorsese
- Midnight in Paris, by Woody Allen
- A Monster in Paris, by Bebo Bergeron
- Monte Carlo, by Tom Bezucha
- Paris Connections, by Harley Cokeliss
- Sherlock Holmes: A Game of Shadows, by Guy Ritchie

==== 2012 ====
- Bel-Ami, by Declan Donnellan and Nick Ormerod
- The Woman in the Fifth, by Pawel Pawlikowski
- LOL, by Lisa Azuelos

==== 2013 ====
- The Smurfs 2, by Raja Gosnell
- Le Week-End, by Roger Michell

==== 2014 ====
- The Xpose
- As Above, So Below (film) by John Erick Dowdle

==== 2015 ====
- An American Girl: Grace Stirs Up Success, by Vince Marcello
- Tomorrowland, by Brad Bird

==== 2018 ====
- Steven Universe Sees Paris: The Movie, by Jasmin Lai and Ian Jones-Quartey
- Mission: Impossible – Fallout, by Christopher McQuarrie
- Fantastic Beasts: The Crimes of Grindelwald, by David Yates and J.K. Rowling

=== 2020s ===
==== 2022 ====
- Mrs. Harris Goes to Paris by Anthony Fabian

==== 2023 ====
- JK 1971 by Fakhrul Arefeen Khan
- John Wick: Chapter 4, by Chad Stahelski

==== 2025 ====
- El Sett by Marwan Hamed

== Paris destroyed on film ==
- The War of the Worlds (1953), by Byron Haskin
- Destroy All Monsters (1968)
- Superman II (1980), by Richard Lester
- Independence Day (1996), by Roland Emmerich
- Mars Attacks! (1996), by Tim Burton
- Armageddon (1998), by Michael Bay
- Team America: World Police (2004), by Trey Parker
- Godzilla: Final Wars (2004)
- Supernova (2005), by John Harrison
- 28 Weeks Later (2007), by Juan Carlos Fresnadillo
- The Day the Earth Stopped (2008), by C. Thomas Howell
- Transformers: Revenge of the Fallen (2008), by Michael Bay
- Cloudy with a Chance of Meatballs (2009), by Phil Lord and Christopher Miller
- G.I. Joe: The Rise of Cobra (2009), by Stephen Sommers
- Edge of Tomorrow (2014), by Doug Liman
- Under Paris (2024) by Xavier Gens
