= Fallait pas !... =

- Directed by: Gérard Jugnot
- Screenplay by: Gérard Jugnot; Philippe Lopes-Curval
- Produced by: Alain Depardieu
- Starring: Gérard Jugnot; François Morel; Michèle Laroque
- Cinematography: Gérard de Battista
- Edited by: Catherine Kelber
- Music by: Khalil Chahine
- Production companies: Ciby 2000; TF1 Films Production
- Distributed by: Ciby Distribution
- Release date: 20 November 1996
- Running time: 95 minutes
- Country: France
- Language: French

Fallait pas !... is a 1996 French comedy film directed by Gérard Jugnot.

== Plot ==
The CHRO of a company, Bernard Leroy comes back from a team building organized by his company, and has to join the mansion of his future in-laws, where his parents, parents-in-law and fiancée wait for him : his wedding is the following day. But a car accident on a mountain road forces him to ask for help in a chalet, which reveals being the landmark of a sect where the guru, Magic, is about to eliminate the members.

Prisoner of the chalet, Bernard leads in his escape Sébastien, an adept fearful man, and arrives to steal the guru's car just before the explosives reduce the chalet into ashes. The problem is that the car also contains a briefcase containing 2 million dollars that should have been given to the doctor Simpson, a very wealthy and well-known psychiatrist. The guru and his accountant run after the two fugitives while on their side, Bernard and Sébastien temporarily find a refuge at the hotel after having attempted to prevent the police. Having not arrived to find the fugitives, Magic and Solomouka randomly find the invitation to Bernard's wedding and decode to go to the mansion to wait for him, and even take his family in hostage.

Bernard's fiancée, Constance, already troubled during the evening by the excentricity of Bernard's "parents", who are actually two actors that he has engaged, is not fooled of the behaviour of the two people. Asking them for additional explications, she is hypnotized by Magic and deeply falls asleep. Meanwhile, the henchmen of the doctor Simpson who run after Sébastien after a rough confrontation with Magic arrive in the hotel room, take both men in hostage and take them in a remote mountain corner. Bernard escapes with the help of Sébastien who steals the car of the two men and picks him up before having an accident a few metres further. In a race against the time to bring back the briefcase before the mansion is dynamited with all its occupants, the two fugitives finally reach the mansion and are controlled by the guru and his accountant.

While everything seems lost and the guru is about to trigger the fatal explosion, inside his car, it is finally the car that explodes to everyone's surprise. A few moments later, Sébastien explains himself, pretexting the repentance to his guru, he discreetley stole the detonator and placed it in his coat, filled with explosives.

== Filming locations ==
The shooting took place in spring 1996 in Isère and Savoie in Val d'Isère, Villaroger, Sainte-Foy-Tarentaise, Montmélian, Challes-les-Eaux, Saint-Alban-Leysse and at the Château du Touvet.

== Cast ==
- Gérard Jugnot as Bernard Leroy
- François Morel as Sébastien Coulibœuf
- Michèle Laroque as Constance
- Martin Lamotte as Aimé Solomuka
- Jean Yanne as Magic
- Micheline Presle as Bernard's "mother"
- Claude Piéplu as Bernard's "father"
- Sophie Desmarets as Constance's mother
- Jacques Jouanneau as Constance's father
- Thierry Lhermitte as Dr. Simpson
- Annie Grégorio as Thérèse
- Marine Mazéas as Gwenaëlle
- Bruno Slagmulder as Constance's brother
- Maurice Illouz as a gendarme
- Bonnafet Tarbouriech as a gendarme
- Philippe Sturbelle as a gendarme
- Éric Prat as a gendarme
- Jean-François Chaintron as Bernard's boss
- Hubert Saint-Macary : as Bernard's co-worker
- Philippe Béglia as the hotel owner
- Pascal Elbé as the gas station employee
- Pierre Chevallier as the bus driver
- David Douillet as Tcherno, henchman of Dr. Simpson
- Maxime Leroux as a henchman of Dr. Simpson
