= Ticky Holgado =

French actor (1944–2004)

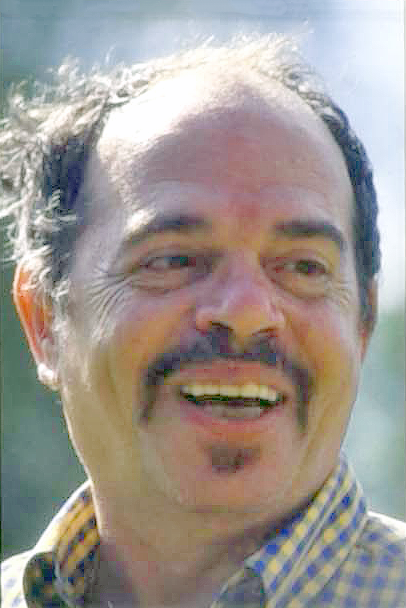
- Holgado in 1998
- Born: Joseph Holgado; 24 June 1944; Toulouse, France
- Died: 22 January 2004 (aged 59); Paris, France
- Occupation: Actor

Joseph Holgado, known professionally as Ticky Holgado (24 June 1944 – 22 January 2004), was a French actor. Known for his short stature, distinctive face and heavy Southern accent, he was a frequent collaborator with filmmaker Jean-Pierre Jeunet.

== Career ==
Holgado's original vocation was to be a musician. After playing in a band as a teenager, he found work in the French music industry and was eventually employed as a personal secretary by singer Claude François, then by Johnny Hallyday.

He became an actor in his mid-thirties and began appearing in small roles, mostly in comedy films. He gradually became a familiar face in French films.

In 1991, Holgado appeared in two films that allowed him to gain greater fame, Delicatessen by Jean-Pierre Jeunet and Marc Caro, then Une époque formidable..., by Gérard Jugnot, where he played a part written especially for him.

During the years that followed, Holgado was very active as a character actor. He was nominated twice to the César Award for Best Supporting Actor, first for Une époque formidable..., then for French Twist (1994).

In September 2003, Holgado announced the remission of his lung cancer, which had considerably rarefied his appearances on the screen since 2000. On 5 January 2004, he had just begun work on a new film with Claude Lelouch, but he succumbed to cancer on 22 January 2004. He left a posthumous message, in the form of a document which appeared on his hospital bed after taking him to surgery to remove his fourth cancerous tumor. Holgado declared there: "It is necessary to tell to people that it's absolutely necessary to stop smoking".

Ticky Holgado was buried at the Père Lachaise Cemetery (45th division).

== Filmography ==
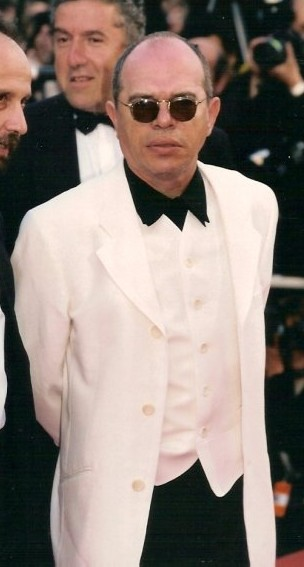
Holgado at the 1997 Cannes Film Festival.

- Les Surdoués de la première compagnie (1980, directed by Michel Gérard) (starring Bernard Lavalette, Hubert Deschamps) – Le voisin
- Madame Claude 2 (1981, directed by François Mimet) – (uncredited)
- Putain d'histoire d'amour (1981, directed by Gilles Béhat) (starring Richard Berry, Mirella D'Angelo) – Un de la bande des Gominés
- Belles, blondes et bronzées (1981, directed by Max Pécas) (starring Philippe Klébert, Xavier Deluc) – Gus
- Comment draguer toutes les filles (1981, directed by Michel Vocoret) – Antoine, le garagiste
- On n'est pas sorti de l'auberge (1982, directed by Max Pécas)
- Circulez y'a rien à voir (1983, directed by Patrice Leconte) – Le planton N°1
- Les planqués du régiment (1983, directed by Michel Caputo) – Le militaire qui vient chercher des fleurs pour le maréchal Mégalo
- On l'appelle catastrophe (1983, directed by Richard Balducci) (starring Michel Leeb, Darry Cowl) – Alphonse
- Les branchés à St. Tropez (1983, directed by Max Pécas) (starring Olivia Dutron, Xavier Deluc) – Ticky
- Mesrine (1984, directed by André Génovès)
- Le juge (1984, directed by Philippe Lefebvre) – Un garde
- Le Fou du roi (1984, directed by Yvan Chiffre) (starring Diane Bellego, Gaëtan Bloom)
- My New Partner (1984, directed by Claude Zidi) (starring Thierry Lhermitte, Philippe Noiret) – Alphonse
- Comment draguer tous les mecs (1984, directed by Jean-Paul Feuillebois) – Frère Gontran
- Brigade des mœurs (1985, directed by Max Pécas) (starring Thierry Carbonnières, Jean-Marc Maurel)
- Les rois du gag (1985, directed by Claude Zidi)
- Adieu Blaireau (1985, directed by Bob Decout) – Le barman
- Le bonheur a encore frappé (1986, directed by Jean-Luc Trotignon) – Gérant du supermarché
- Nuit d'ivresse (1986, directed by Bernard Nauer) (starring Josiane Balasko and Thierry Lhermitte) – L'électro
- Manon des sources (1986, directed by Claude Berri) (starring Yves Montand, Daniel Auteuil) – Le Spécialiste
- Sale destin (1987, directed by Sylvain Madigan)
- Lévy et Goliath (1987, directed by Gérard Oury) – Le faux bossu
- Lady Cops (1987, directed by Josiane Balasko) (starring Josiane Balasko, Isaach Bankolé) – Blondel / Insp. Blondel
- Without Fear or Blame (1988, directed by Gérard Jugnot) (starring Remi Martin, Roland Giraud) – Mignard de Parthode
- The Hairdresser's Husband (1990, directed by Patrice Leconte) (starring Jean Rochefort, Anna Galiena) – Morvoisieux Son-in-Law
- My Mother's Castle (1990, directed by Yves Robert) (starring Julien Ciamaca, Philippe Caubère) – Binucci
- Uranus (1990, directed by Claude Berri) (starring Michel Blanc, Gérard Depardieu) – Mégrin, l'avocat
- Delicatessen (1991, directed by Jean-Pierre Jeunet, Marc Caro) (starring Dominique Pinon, Marie-Laure Dougnac) – Marcel Tapioca
- The Professional Secrets of Dr. Apfelgluck (1991, directed by Alessandro Capone, Stéphane Clavier) (starring Josiane Balasko, Alain Chabat) – Le Ténardie
- Une époque formidable... (1991, directed by Gérard Jugnot) (starring Richard Bohringer, Victoria Abril, César du meilleur second rôle masculin) – Crayon
- Mayrig (1991, directed by Henri Verneuil) (starring Richard Berry, Claudia Cardinale)
- My Life Is Hell (1991, directed by Josiane Balasko) (starring Daniel Auteuil, Josiane Balasko) – El Diablo
- The Supper (1992, directed by Edouard Molinaro) (starring Claude Brasseur, Claude Rich) – Jacques
- Tango (1993, directed by Patrice Leconte) – Waiter
- Drôles d'oiseaux ! (1993, directed by Peter Kassovitz) (starring Bernard Giraudeau, Patrick Chesnais) – Benoit Cabane
- Justinien Trouvé, ou le bâtard de Dieu (1993, directed by Christian Fechner) (starring Pierre-Olivier Mornas, Bernard-Pierre Donnadieu) – Beaulouis
- Lost in Transit (1993, directed by Philippe Lioret) (starring Jean Rochefort, Marisa Paredes) – Serge
- L'honneur de la tribu (1993, directed by Mahmoud Zemmouri) – Martial
- French Twist (1995, directed by Josiane Balasko) (starring Victoria Abril, Josiane Balasko, Alain Chabat) (Nominated – César Award for Best Supporting Actor) – Antoine
- Les Misérables (1995, directed by Claude Lelouch) (starring Jean-Paul Belmondo, Michel Boujenah) – Le gentil voyou / Kind Hoodlum
- Funny Bones (1995, directed by Peter Chelsom) (starring Oliver Platt, Oliver Reed) – Battiston
- The City of Lost Children (1995, directed by Jean-Pierre Jeunet, Marc Caro) (starring Ron Perlman, Judith Vittet) – Ex-Acrobat
- Les Milles (le train de la liberté) (1995, directed by Sebastien Grall) (starring Philippe Noiret, Rüdiger Vogler) – Capt. Moinard
- Lumière and Company (1995, directed by Lasse Hallström, Abbas Kiarostami) (starring Pernilla August, Romane Bohringer) – (segment "Claude Lelouch")
- Let's Hope it Lasts (1996, directed by Michel Thibaud) (starring Gérard Darmon, Catherina Jacob, Emmanuelle Seigner) – Joseph Ponty
- Men, Women: A User's Manual (1996, directed by Claude Lelouch) – Toc Toc, Loulou's Father
- The Best Job in the World (1996, directed by Gérard Lauzier) (starring Gérard Depardieu, Michèle Laroque) – Baudouin
- La chasse au rhinocéros à Budapest (1997, directed by Michael Haussman) (starring Nick Cave) – Alcoholic Man
- Amour et confusions (1997, directed by Patrick Braoudé) (starring Patrick Braoudé, Kristin Scott Thomas) – The sexologist
- Let There Be Light (1998, directed by Arthur Joffe) (starring Hélène de Fougerolles, Tchéky Karyo) – L'ange René
- Prison à domicile (1998, directed by Christophe Jacrot) (starring Jean-Roger Milo, Hélène Vincent) – Jules Klarh
- Le Sourire du clown (1998, directed by Éric Besnard) (Bruno Putzulu) – Ian
- Le schpountz (1999, directed by Gérard Oury) (starring Smaïn, Sabine Azéma) – Oncle Baptiste
- Actors (2000, directed by Bertrand Blier) (starring Pierre Arditi, Josiane Balasko) – Le clochard cul-de-jatte
- Most Promising Young Actress (2000, directed by Gérard Jugnot) (starring Gérard Jugnot, Bérénice Bejo, Chantal Lauby) – Un SDF
- Amélie (2000, directed by Jean-Pierre Jeunet) (starring Audrey Tautou, Mathieu Kassovitz) – L'homme dans la photo
- Philosophale (2001, directed by Farid Fedjer (starring Yves Rénier)
- Le Barbier (2001, Short, directed by Jon Carnoy) (starring Ticky Holgado, François Levantal) – Le barbier
- Monsieur Batignole (2002, directed by Gérard Jugnot) (starring Gérard Jugnot, Jules Sitruk) – Lucien Morel
- Trois Zéros (2002, directed by Fabien Onteniente) (starring Samuel Le Bihan, Gérard Lanvin) – Angelo
- And Now... Ladies and Gentlemen (2002, directed by Claude Lelouch) (starring Jeremy Irons, Patricia Kaas) – Boubou
- Station 137 (2002, directed by Bruno François-Boucher)
- Le Temps du RMI (2002, directed by Farid Fedjer (starring Laure Sainclair)
- Ruby & Quentin (2003, directed by Francis Veber) (starring Jean Reno, Gérard Depardieu) – Martineau
- Les gaous (2003, directed by Igor Sekulic) – Jojo
- The Car Keys (2003, directed by Laurent Baffie) – Le chanteur du happy-end
- Les parisiens (2004, directed by Claude Lelouch) (starring Massimo Ranieri, Maïwenn Le Besco) – Dieu
- A Very Long Engagement (2004, directed by Jean-Pierre Jeunet) (starring Audrey Tautou, Gaspard Ulliel) – Germain Pire
- Le courage d'aimer (2005, directed by Claude Lelouch) – Dieu
