= Jugnot =

Jugnot is a surname. Notable people with the surname include:

- Arthur Jugnot (born 1980), French actor and director
- Gérard Jugnot (born 1951), French actor, director, screenwriter and producer
