= Une époque formidable... =

- Directed by: Gérard Jugnot
- Screenplay by: Gérard Jugnot; Philippe Lopes-Curval
- Starring: Gérard Jugnot; Richard Bohringer; Victoria Abril; Ticky Holgado
- Cinematography: Gérard de Battista
- Edited by: Catherine Kelber
- Music by: Francis Cabrel
- Distributed by: AMLF
- Release date: 19 June 1991
- Running time: 97 minutes
- Country: France
- Language: French
- Box office: $12.5 million

Une époque formidable... is a 1991 French comedy-drama film directed by Gérard Jugnot.

== Plot ==
Michel Berthier is a qualified employee in a company specialized in sale of mattresses, until he is laid off. Absolutely wanting to have a child with his wife Juliette, who already has two children from her first marriage, he tells nothing, and quickly finds himself in a situation to leave the family home. After a few misadventures, Michel Berthier meets Crayon, Le Toubib and Mimosa, who will become his unfortunate companions among the homelesses.

== Cast ==
- Gérard Jugnot as Michel Berthier
- Richard Bohringer as Le Toubib
- Victoria Abril as Juliette
- Ticky Holgado as Crayon
- Roland Blanche as Copi
- Chick Ortega as Mimosa
- Éric Prat as Malakian
- Julien Harlay as Vincent
- Beryl Le Lasseur as Émilie
- Charlotte de Turckheim as Rita
- Zabou Breitman as The interviewer
- Michèle Laroque as The headhunter
- Patrick Timsit as Le Borgne
- Chantal Ladesou as The injured nurse
- Laurent Gamelon as The Muscular Guy
- Franck de Lapersonne as The hotel receptionist
