= Marie-Hélène Lentini =

French actress and comedian

- Born: Unknown; Paris, France
- Occupations: Actress, Comedian
- Years active: 1988–present

Marie-Hélène Lentini is a French actress and comedian.

== Theater ==
Year	Title	Author	Director
1988	Direction critorium	Guy Foissy	Michel Fau
1989	Après la pluie, le beau temps	Countess of Ségur	Philippe Person
1990-91	The Imaginary Invalid	Molière	Marc Fayet
1991	J’ai 20 ans et je t’emmerde	Roger Louret	Roger Louret
1992	Phèdre	Jean Racine	Stéphane Auvray-Nauroy
1993	Sabato, domenica e lunedì	Eduardo De Filippo	Françoise Petit
1993	Il est trop tard	Stéphane Auvray-Nauroy	Stéphane Auvray-Nauroy
1994-95	Je t’aime	Sacha Guitry	Patrick Pessis
1995	Reviens pas, je t’en supplie	Gad Israel	Gad Israel
1999-2000	La Reine de la Nuit	Philippe Détré	Philippe Détré
2002-04	Un vrai bonheur	Didier Caron	Didier Caron
2005	Les vérités vraies	Didier Caron	Didier Caron
2005-06	Les Héritiers	Alain Krief	Jean-Pierre Dravel & Olivier Macé
2006	The Decline of the American Empire	Denys Arcand	Claude-Michel Rome
2007-08	Un vrai bonheur 2	Didier Caron	Didier Caron
2008	Les Enfants de l'Olympia	Thierry Sforza & Odile Bastien	Thierry Sforza & Odile Bastien
2009-11	La Cage aux Folles	Jean Poiret	Didier Caron
2011-12	André le Magnifique	Isabelle Candelier, Denis Podalydès, Michel Vuillermoz, ...	Didier Caron
2013-14	Des pieds et des mains	Galton and Simpson	Arthur Jugnot & David Roussel
2014-17	Steel Magnolias	Robert Harling	Didier Caron & Dominique Guillo
2015-17	Cactus Flower	Pierre Barillet & Jean-Pierre Gredy	Michel Fau
2016-19	Poisson et petits pois !	Ana Maria Bamberger	Slimane Kacioui & Aliocha Itovich
2017-18	Tous nos voeux de bonheur !	Marilyne Bal	Jean-Philippe Azéma
2018-20	Dîner de famille	Joseph Gallet & Pascal Rocher	Pascal Rocher
2018-22	Aux deux colombes	Sacha Guitry	Thomas Le Douarec
2020	Une chance insolente	Olivier Lejeune	Olivier Lejeune
2021	Fugue nuptiale	Stéphane Hervé	Jean-Philippe Azéma
2021	Ça reste entre nous	Brigitte Massiot	Olivier Macé
2021-23	Boeing-Boeing	Marc Camoletti	Philippe Hersen
2022	Uranus	Marcel Aymé	Didier Caron
2022-23	Embrasse ta mère	Karine Dubernet	Karine Dubernet
2023-24	À quel prix tu m’aimes ?	Guillaume Mélanie & Jean Franco	Guillaume Mélanie
2024-25	Ma famille en or	Élodie Wallace & Joseph Gallet	Anne Bouvier

== Filmography ==
=== Cinema ===
Year	Title	Role	Director	Notes
1998	La voie est libre	Diane's colleague	Stéphane Clavier	
1999	Les petits souliers	The governess	Éric Toledano and Olivier Nakache	Short
2001	Vertiges de l'amour	Dominique	Laurent Chouchan	
2002	Monsieur Batignole	Madame Taillepied	Gérard Jugnot	
2002	Saturday night frayeur	Tara	Nathalie Serrault	Short
2005	Un vrai bonheur	Yvonne	Didier Caron	
2008	Ça se soigne ?	Sandra	Laurent Chouchan	
2009	Rose et noir	Fashion Show Woman	Gérard Jugnot	
2012	Lapse	Danielle	Gilles Guerraz	Short
2018	Artem silendi	Sister Marie-Hélène	Frank Ychou	Short
2019	Inséparables	Sonia	Varante Soudjian	
2019	Serial (Bad) Weddings 2	Guilaine Monfau	Philippe de Chauveron	
2022	Qu'est-ce qu'on a tous fait au Bon Dieu ?	Gisèle Montfort	Philippe de Chauveron	
2024	Finalement	Madame Barbier	Claude Lelouch	

=== Television ===
Year	Title	Role	Director	Notes
1996	Sans mentir	Anne	Joyce Buñuel	TV movie
2001	La juge Beaulieu	Élodie	Joyce Buñuel	TV movie
2001	Un citronnier pour deux	Mona	Élisabeth Rappeneau	TV movie
2002	Une autre femme	Carine	Jérôme Foulon	TV movie
2002	La vie devant nous	Madame Zem	Vincenzo Marano	TV series (1 episode)
2003	Docteur Claire Bellac	Michèle	Denis Malleval	TV series (2 episodes)
2004	Faites le 15	Martine	Étienne Dhaene	TV movie
2004	Commissaire Valence	Madame Lemoine	Vincenzo Marano	TV series (1 episode)
2004-08	Père et maire	The judge	Vincenzo Marano & Pascal Heylbroeck	TV series (2 episodes)
2005	Mademoiselle Navarro	Mademoiselle Rame	Jean Sagols	TV movie
2005	Le détective : Contre-enquête	Marinette	Dennis Berry	TV movie
2005	Mademoiselle Joubert	Josette	Vincenzo Marano	TV series (1 episode)
2006	The Poisoner	Madame Rossignol	Christian Faure	TV movie
2006	S.O.S. 18	Madame Pallicot	Bruno Garcia	TV series (1 episode)
2007	La taupe	The surgeon	Vincenzo Marano	TV movie
2009	Central nuit	Madame Rival	Gérard Marx	TV series (1 episode)
2009	La vie est à nous	Marion's Mother	Laura Muscardin	TV series (1 episode)
2009	R.I.S, police scientifique	Committee Member	Alexandre Laurent	TV series (1 episode)
2011	Le choix d'Adèle	Josiane	Olivier Guignard	TV movie
2011	Fais pas ci, fais pas ça	Madame Descato	Laurent Dussaux	TV series (2 episodes)
2012-14	La Méthode Claire	The judge	Vincent Monnet	TV series (2 episodes)
2013	Scènes de ménages	Madame Pinot	Francis Duquet	TV series (2 episodes)
2013-15	Pep's	Anne-Marie Truche	Jonathan Barré, Stéphane Kopecky, ...	TV series
2014	Les tourtereaux divorcent	Odette Chapuis	Vincenzo Marano	TV movie
2015	Boulevard du Palais	Madame Lafleur	Christian Bonnet	TV series (1 episode)
2015	Josephine, Guardian Angel	Hélène Fabriski	Stéphane Kopecky	TV series (1 episode)
2019	Access	Opener	Varante Soudjian	TV series (1 episode)
2020	Call My Agent!	The seller	Marc Fitoussi	TV series (1 episode)
2024	R.I.P. Aimons-nous vivants !	Louison	Frédéric Berthe	TV movie
2024	Tom et Lola	Baya	Stéphane Kopecky, Thierry Petit, ...	TV series (6 episodes)
