= Scout toujours... =

- Directed by: Gérard Jugnot
- Written by: Gérard Jugnot; Christian Biegalski; Pierre Geller
- Starring: Gérard Jugnot; Jean-Claude Leguay; Éric Prat
- Cinematography: Gérard de Battista
- Edited by: Catherine Kelber
- Music by: Gabriel Yared
- Distributed by: AMLF
- Release date: 27 November 1985
- Running time: 98 minutes
- Country: France
- Language: French

Scout toujours... is a 1985 French comedy film directed by Gérard Jugnot.

== Plot ==
The film starts in June 1965. Deciding to get rid of their tyrannic leaders they nicknamed "Diên Biên Phu" because of his obsessions of sergeant instructor, a troop of scouts from Île-de-France spoil the Scout Promise ceremony. Back in Paris, they even put out of race their leader by letting him fall in a manhole cover.

In Summer 1965, it is finally to Jean-Baptiste Foucret, nicknamed "Biquet" by a too invading mother, that is given the big responsibility to bring a turbulent troop in a summer camp. But if the father of Jean-Baptiste was known for being a scout and an exceptional scout leader, his son is far to become like him. Without an experience as a leader, without a real authority and without real support from his assistants, "Biquet" is exceeded by the events. The scouts made of him their punchbag, and that they are far of being nice with him.

From the bus fire to the revolt of the Impalas patrol, Jean-Baptiste will have to compose with the chaplain's father, not always easy, the chaplain's sister, with light mores, and Édith, a woman of the village with even lighter mores. In addition of the Gypsies with whom the relationships are not always easy, the countrymen who cannot stand anymore the tricks of the scouts, and the scouts themselves, never without new ideas, who will make him live the worst situations ever lived.

== Cast ==
=== Scout leaders ===
- Gérard Jugnot ... Jean-Baptiste Foucret
- Jean-Claude Leguay ... Georges
- Éric Prat ... Pschitt

=== Guillemin family ===
- Jean Rougerie ... Benoît de Guillemin, the father
- Jean-Paul Comart ... Thierry de Guillemin, the young priest
- Agnès Blanchot ... Marie-France de Guillemin

=== Scouts ===
- Cédric Dumond ... Étienne
- Julien Dubois ... Fla Fla
- Guillaume Pétraud ... Joseph Benamou
- Guillaume Cabrère ... Louis Bardinski
- Robert Sirvent ... Nodet Langlois
- Franck Beaujour ... Pois chiche
- Stéphane Thil ... Emmanuel
- Romain Soler ... Anthony
- Fabien Remblier ... Jacky
- Louis Leterrier ... Tommy

=== Other characters ===
- Maurice Barrier ... Marek the Gypsy
- Sophie Grimaldi ... Madeleine Foucret
- Jean-Yves Chatelais ... Bien bien fou
- Philippe Ogouz ... De la Motte
- Bernard Cazassus ... the countryman
- Nicole Felix ... Édith

== About the film ==
- It is the second film directed by Gérard Jugnot, one year after Pinot simple flic.
