= Philippe Lopes-Curval =

French film director and screenwriter (1951–2023)

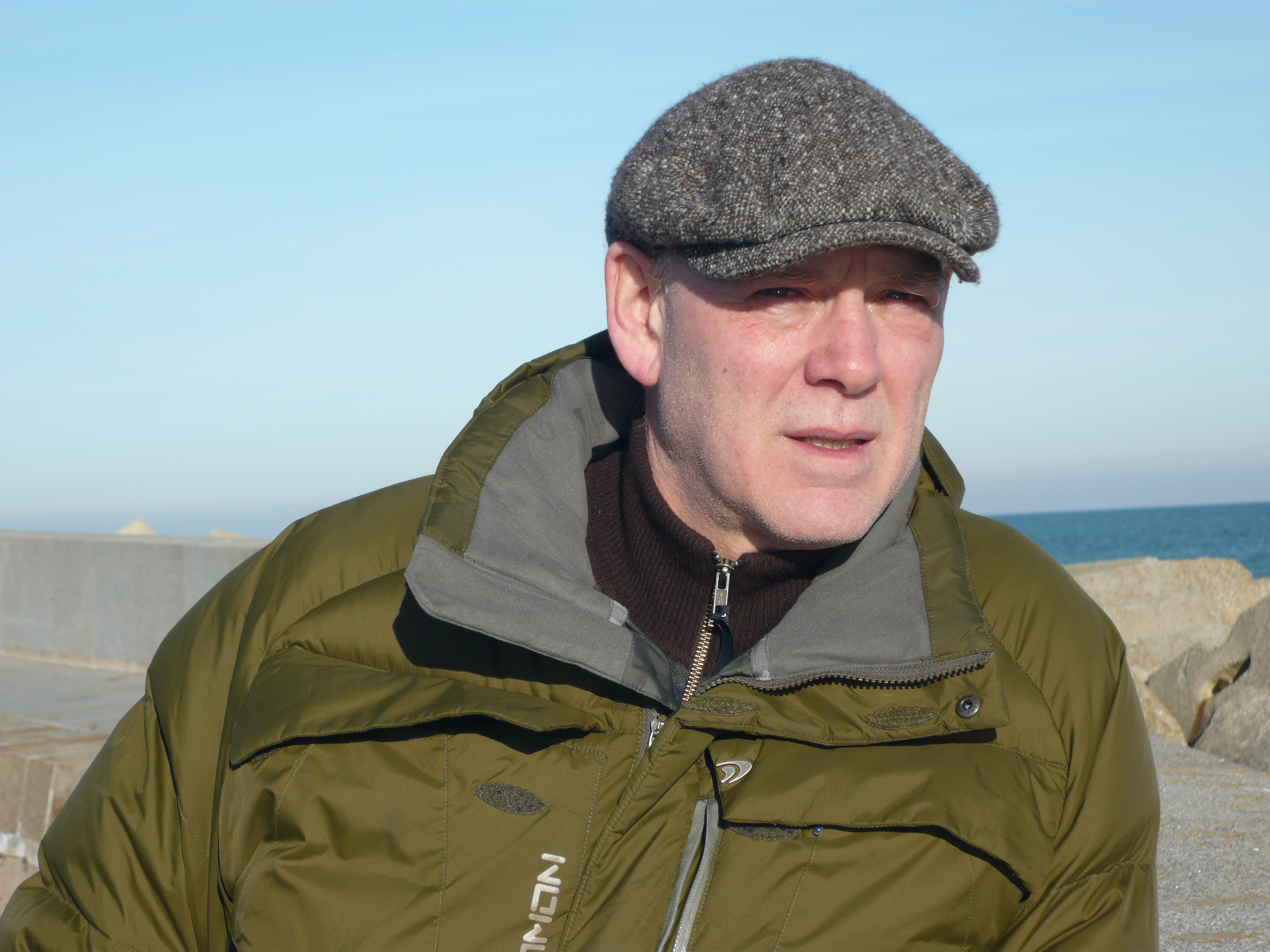
- Lopes-Curval in 2008
- Born: Philippe Jean Lopes-Curval; 9 June 1951; Bayeux, France
- Died: 13 February 2023 (aged 71); Bayeux, France
- Occupations: Film director Screenwriter

Philippe Jean Lopes-Curval (9 June 1951 – 13 February 2023) was a French film director and screenwriter.

== Biography ==
Born in Bayeux on 9 June 1951, Lopes-Curval directed a series of short films before directing his first feature film, Trop tard Balthazar, in 1986. Released on Canal+, the film was noticed by Jean-Claude Fleury, who introduced him to Gérard Jugnot. This began a longtime collaboration with Jugnot, having partnered for the films Casque bleu, Fallait pas !..., Monsieur Batignole, Boudu, and Fashion Victim. He also wrote the screenplay for the Christophe Barratier film The Chorus.

In 2017, Lopes-Curval co-signed the booklet for the musical festival at the Folies Bergère. In addition to his film career, he worked on television as well, notably writing the screenplay for Maintenant ou jamais, directed by Jérôme Foulon. In 2011, he wrote a comic book, Les Grobec.

Lopes-Curval was the father of fellow film director Julie Lopes-Curval and married to painter Catherine Lopes-Curval. He died in Bayeux on 13 February 2023, at the age of 71.

== Screenplays ==
- Trop tard Balthazar (1986)
- Le Parisien (1989)
- Une époque formidable... (1991)
- Casque bleu (1994)
- Fallait pas !... (1996)
- La Mostra (1998)
- Jo, l'Irlandaise (2000)
- Monsieur Batignole (2002)
- The Chorus (2004)
- Boudu (2005)
- Fashion Victim (2008)
- Dans tes rêves (2010)
- La Montre du Président (2010)
- War of the Buttons (2011)
- Vintage (2014)
- L'École de la liberté (2022)

== Films directed ==
- Le Drapeau tricolore (1982)
- À pic (1982)
- Rohner peintre (1983)
- Trop tard Balthazar (1986)
- Baby comme back (1987)
- Côté cour, côté jardin (1995)
