= Boudu =

- Film poster
- Directed by: Gérard Jugnot
- Written by: René Fauchois; Philippe Lopes-Curval
- Produced by: Jean-Pierre Guérin; Véronique Marchat
- Starring: Gérard Depardieu; Catherine Frot; Gérard Jugnot
- Cinematography: Gérard Simon
- Edited by: Catherine Kelber
- Distributed by: Pathé Distribution
- Release date: 28 July 2005
- Running time: 104 min
- Country: France
- Language: French
- Budget: $11.5 million
- Box office: $9 million

Boudu is a 2005 French comedy film directed by Gérard Jugnot. It is a remake of Jean Renoir's 1932 film, Boudu Saved from Drowning.

== Cast ==
- Gérard Depardieu - Boudu
- Catherine Frot - Yseult
- Gérard Jugnot - Christian
- Constance Dollé - Coralie
- Bonnafet Tarbouriech - Perez
- Hubert Saint-Macary - Bob
- Jean-Paul Rouve - Hubert
- Serge Riaboukine - Géronimo
- Dominique Ratonnat - Le médecin
- Jean-Pierre Foucault - Himself
