= Jean Rougerie =

French actor and singer (1929–1998)

- Born: 9 March 1929; Neuilly-sur-Seine
- Died: 25 January 1998 (aged 68); Ivry-sur-Seine
- Occupation: Actor
- Years active: 1940 – 1990
- Children: 2

Jean Rougerie (9 March 1929 - 25 January 1998) was a French actor. In 1985, he portrayed the character Aubergine in the Bond film A View to a Kill.

== Life ==
Rougerie was born 9 March 1929 in Neuilly-sur-Seine. He died 25 January 1998 in Ivry-sur-Seine as the result of a myocardial infarction.

He is the father of actors Isabelle Rougerie and Sylvain Rougerie.

== Filmography ==
- Monsieur Vincent (1947) - Un pauvre (uncredited)
- La tête contre les murs (1959)
- Le Bossu (1959) - Un spadassin
- Como Fazer o Amor (1962) - (uncredited)
- Les amours particulières (1970) - Le père de Brigitte
- Lacombe, Lucien (1974) - Tonin
- The Phantom of Liberty (1974) - Charles, l'hôte à la réception mondaine
- Let Joy Reign Supreme (1975) - Talhouet
- The Seventh Company Has Been Found (1975) - L'officier allemand joueur d'échecs
- Le jour de gloire (1976) - Von Bach
- Servant and Mistress (1977) - Chef de Cabinet
- La nuit de Saint-Germain-des-Prés (1977) - Le capitaine
- March or Die (1977) - Legionnaire 1 (at station)
- Get Out Your Handkerchiefs (1978) - Mr. Beloeil
- State Reasons (1978) - Le premier ministre
- Judith Therpauve (1978) - Fournol
- Bête, mais discipliné (1979) - Le chef du personnel
- The Police War (1979) - Mermoz
- Buffet froid (1979) - Eugène Léonard, le témoin
- T'inquiète pas, ça se soigne (1980) - Prof. Alfred de Vavin
- Rendez-moi ma peau... (1980) - Karl Malnek
- Tendres Cousines (1980) - Monsieur Lacroix
- Voulez-vous un bébé Nobel? (1980) - Professor Landowsky
- Choice of Arms (1981) - Raymond Constantini
- All Fired Up (1982) - Le médecin
- L'étoile du Nord (1982) - Monsieur Baron
- On s'en fout... nous on s'aime (1982) - L'huissier
- Prends ton passe-montagne, on va à la plag (1983) - Le colonel
- Le prix du danger (1983) - Président commission
- Édith et Marcel (1983) - Theater Director
- My Other Husband (1983) - Mr Santalucia
- Signes extérieurs de richesse (1983) - Gino Caprioni
- The Perils of Gwendoline in the Land of the Yik-Yak (1984) - D'Arcy
- Les cavaliers de l'orage (1984) - Three-star general
- Pinot simple flic (1984) - Vaudreuil
- American Dreamer (1984) - Don Carlos Dominguez
- Slices of Life (1985) - Le téléspectateur / Le père de Cécile
- A View to a Kill (1985) - Achille Aubergine
- The Alley Cat (1985) - Préposé hôtel
- Scout toujours... (1985) - Benoit de Guillemin
- State of Grace (1986) - Edmond Lombard
- Club de rencontres (1987) - Le voisin colérique
- The Miracle (1987) - Monseigneur
- Preuve d'amour (1988) - Commissaire Berthomieu
- Corps z'à corps (1988) - Le médecin
- Les Gauloises blondes (1988) - Malus
- L'invité surprise (1989) - Robineau
- My Father's Glory (1990) - Bergougnas, le brocanteur
- In the Eye of the Snake (1990) - Museum curator
- Merci la vie (1991) - Forensic scientist
- Le fils du Mékong (1992) - Maurichon
- Chacun pour toi (1993) - Igor
