= C'est beau la vie quand on y pense =

- Theatrical release poster
- Directed by: Gérard Jugnot
- Written by: Gérard Jugnot; Guy Laurent; Thibault Vanhulle; Romain Protat
- Produced by: Romain Rojtman
- Starring: Gérard Jugnot; Isabelle Mergault; Bernard Le Coq
- Cinematography: Pierric Gantelmi d'Ille
- Edited by: Claire Fieschi
- Music by: Khalil Chahine; Gisèle Gérard-Tolini
- Production companies: Les Films du 24; Les Films du Premier
- Distributed by: UGC
- Release date: 12 April 2017
- Running time: 95 minutes
- Country: France
- Language: French
- Box office: $2 million

C'est beau la vie quand on y pense (lit. 'Life is beautiful, when you think of it') is a 2017 French film directed by Gérard Jugnot.

== Plot ==
Loïc Le Tallec, a former rally driver, who had a minor hit in the 1980s now in his sixties, vegetate as a salesman in a car dealership. When his teenage son suddenly disappears behind the wheel of his car, Loïc is devastated by this tragedy. He also learns that his son has donated his heart, and goes in search of the one who received this gift, which will prove to be an explosive encounter for Loïc.

== Cast ==
- Gérard Jugnot as Loïc Le Tallec
- François Deblock as Hugo
- Isabelle Mergault as Lisa
- Bernard Le Coq as Marc
- Gaia Weiss as Hoëllig
- Hubert Saint-Macary as Pierre
- Marie Bunel as Clara
- Jérémy Lopez as Sanchez
- Arthur Jugnot as The cyclist
- Giulia Rossa
- Camille Vidacek

== Production ==
The filming began on 29 September 2016, in Île-de-France, Var and Brittany.
