= Most Promising Young Actress =

Most Promising Young Actress French: Meilleur espoir féminin
- Directed by: Gérard Jugnot
- Written by: Gérard Jugnot; Isabelle Mergault
- Produced by: Dominique Farrugia; Olivier Granier
- Starring: Gérard Jugnot; Bérénice Bejo; Antoine Duléry; Chantal Lauby
- Cinematography: Pascal Gennesseaux
- Edited by: Catherine Kelber
- Music by: Khalil Chahine
- Production companies: Rigolo Films 2000; Novo Arturo Films; Les Films Ariane; TF1 Films Production
- Distributed by: UGC Fox Distribution
- Release date: 31 May 2000
- Running time: 100 min.
- Country: France
- Language: French
- Budget: $7,4 million
- Box office: $14.4 million

Most Promising Young Actress (French: Meilleur espoir féminin) is a 2000 French comedy film, directed and co-written by Gérard Jugnot.

== Plot ==
Yvon Rance, a hairdresser in the small town of Cancale, has one daughter, Laetitia. He wants her to become a successful hairdresser and open a salon in Laval or Quimper. Laetitia, however, wants to make films. She secretly auditioned and was selected for a leading role in one. Breaking the news to her father proves difficult and his reaction is rather unpleasant. He tries by all means to prevent her from making the film, but nevertheless wanting happiness for his daughter, he finally agrees to take her on location to Paris. Once they arrive, he never leaves her side, always suspecting Stéphane Leroy, the writer and director of the film, of wanting to shoot disturbing sequences with Laetitia.

== Cast ==
- Gérard Jugnot as Yvon Rance
- Bérénice Bejo as Laetitia Rance
- Antoine Duléry as Stéphane Leroy
- Chantal Lauby as Françoise
- Hubert Saint-Macary as Loïck
- Sabine Haudepin as Hélène
- Didier Flamand as Belabre
- Dora Doll as Madame Guiguan
- Mohamed Hicham as Kader Achour
- Daniel Martin as Michel
- Philippe Beglia as Andrea
- Sylvie Granotier as Claudia
- Laurent Lebras as Cyril
- Frédérique Meininger as Madame Pigrenez
- Anne-Marie Jabraud as Madame Picot
- Anna Gaylor as Madame Favart
- Marie Mergey as Madame Le Cloarec
- Thierry Obaïka as François
- Élise Otzenberger as Julie
- Arthur Jugnot as Alex
- Patrice Juiff as Marco
- Romain Thunin as Christophe
- Justine Bruneau as Marie
- Noémie Ringressi as Anna
- Claire Chiron as Brigitte
- Jean-Claude Bourlat as Ronald
- Olivier Granier as Jean-Paul
- Victoria Obermayer as Stéphanie

=== Cameo ===
- Ticky Holgado as The Homeless
- Jean-Pierre Foucault as himself
- Daniela Lumbroso as herself
- Thierry Lhermitte as A Comedian
- Philippe de Broca as The Director
- Dominique Besnehard as The Flattering
- Michèle Garcia as The Buyer
- Guillaume de Tonquédec as SNCF Employee

== Award ==
- Bérénice Bejo was nominated for the César Award for Most Promising Actress.
