= The Tiger Brigades (film) =

- French movie poster.
- French: Les Brigades du Tigre
- Directed by: Jérôme Cornuau
- Written by: Xavier Dorison; Fabien Nury
- Produced by: Roberto Cipullo; Vincent Roget
- Starring: Clovis Cornillac; Diane Kruger; Édouard Baer; Olivier Gourmet; Stefano Accorsi; Jacques Gamblin; Thierry Frémont; Léa Drucker
- Cinematography: Stéphane Cami
- Edited by: Brian Schmitt
- Music by: Claude Bolling; Olivier Florio
- Distributed by: TFM Distribution
- Release date: 12 April 2006
- Running time: 125 minutes
- Country: France
- Language: French
- Budget: $17.8 million
- Box office: $10.7 million

The Tiger Brigades (French: Les Brigades du Tigre) is a 2006 French crime film. Based on a very successful 1970s-'80s French television series of the same name the film depicts an Untouchables-type crack "Flying Squad" once formed by then PM Georges Clemenceau to tackle rampant crime in 1912 Paris. The squads became known to the public as "Tiger Brigades", after Clemenceau's nickname "Le Tigre", and were among the first police units to be equipped with automobiles, telephones, telegraphs and seriously trained in French boxing and Canne de combat.

Gathering a talented pan-European cast, the film is set in the vibrant Belle Époque and deals with a lot of real historical plots and characters like the scandal of the Russian Loans, the Triple Entente, the birth of modern profiling and crime-fighting police techniques, international police cooperation, the new rivalry between Louis Lépine's PP (Paris Police Prefecture) Brigade Criminelle and Clémenceau's Brigade Mobile (ancestors of the current Central Directorate of the Judicial Police), the birth of Socialism and famous Anarchist Movements.

== Plot ==
Valentin and his squad of Mobilards are assigned to track down the infamous Bonnot Gang.

== Cast ==
- Clovis Cornillac as Commissaire Valentin
- Diane Kruger as Constance Bolkonsky
- Édouard Baer as Inspector Pujol
- Olivier Gourmet as Inspecteur Marcel Terrasson
- Stefano Accorsi as Achille Bianchi
- Jacques Gamblin as Jules Bonnot
- Thierry Frémont as Piotr
- Léa Drucker as Léa
- Aleksandr Medvedev as Prince Bolkonsky
- Gérard Jugnot as Claude Faivre
- Agnès Soral as Mademoiselle Amélie
- Éric Prat as Alphonse Bertillon
- Didier Flamand as Louis Lépine
- Philippe Duquesne as Casimir Cagne
- Frédéric Bouraly as Caby
- Mathias Mlekuz as Célestin Hennion
- Nicholas Calderbank as Hollingworth
- Roland Cope as Raymond Poincaré

== TV serial ==
Les Brigades du Tigre is also the name of a French TV serial, produced between 1974 and 1983.
