= East/West =

1999 film by Régis Wargnier

- French theatrical release poster
- French: Est-Ouest
- Directed by: Régis Wargnier
- Written by: Rustam Ibragimbekov; Sergei Bodrov; Louis Gardel; Régis Wargnier
- Produced by: Yves Marmion; Alexander Rodnyansky
- Starring: Sandrine Bonnaire; Oleg Menshikov; Catherine Deneuve; Sergei Bodrov Jr.; Grigori Manoukov; Tatyana Dogileva; Bohdan Stupka; Hubert Saint-Macary; Atanass Atanassov
- Cinematography: Laurent Dailland
- Edited by: Hervé Schneid
- Music by: Patrick Doyle
- Production companies: UGC YM; Mate Producciones; NTV-Profit; France 3 Cinéma
- Distributed by: UGC Fox Distribution (France); Alta Films (Spain)
- Release dates: 4 August 1999 (Locarno); 1 September 1999 (France); 25 February 2000 (Spain); 7 April 2000 (Russia)
- Running time: 124 minutes
- Countries: Bulgaria; France; Russia; Spain
- Languages: French; Russian
- Budget: $9.1 million
- Box office: $9.4 million

East/West (French: Est-Ouest; Russian: «Восток-Запад», romanized: Vostok-Zapad) is a 1999 drama film directed by Régis Wargnier, starring Sandrine Bonnaire, Oleg Menshikov, Catherine Deneuve and Sergei Bodrov Jr. It received generally positive reviews from critics. The film was nominated for the Best Foreign Language Film at the 72nd Academy Awards.

== Plot ==
In 1946, Stalin invites all White Russian émigrés, who had fled to the West after the Bolshevik Russian Revolution of 1917, to return to the USSR to help rebuild the devastated motherland in the aftermath of the Second World War and offers them citizenship. Among a group of French émigrés is the doctor Alexei Golovin (Menshikov), who believes in Stalin's promises of a peaceful new beginning, his French wife Marie (Bonnaire), and their young son Serjoscha. The atmosphere on the ship taking them to Russia is jovial, with drinking and singing. But as soon as they dock in Odessa, it is clear that Stalin was using his promises as an excuse to murder the exiles or have them put in Gulags. Once ashore, the Soviet authorities separate the returning émigrés into two groups, 'fit' and 'unfit'. A young man is shot trying to run back to his father from whom he is separated, and the Golovins begin to understand the situation they have landed in.

On arrival Marie is branded a spy by a Soviet official, and her French passport is torn up. The family moves into a cramped apartment in a communal house in Kyiv and Alexei accepts a job overseeing workers' health in a factory. Marie briefly befriends the elderly housekeeper — who speaks some French—but this lady is quickly 'denounced', taken away, and ends up dead. Her grandson Sasha (Bodrov) is left without a home when a couple arrive and claim his grandmother's room. Marie invites him to live in the Golovins' room.

Marie feels stifled and repressed and wants to go back to France. She attempts to go to the Soviet authorities and ask to be sent back, but she is stopped by Alexei. Public non-compliance, he knows, could get them all killed. She also approaches a visiting French actress, Gabrielle (Deneuve), and attempts to gain her help in escaping the USSR. Marie and Alexei grow distant as he assumes his role as the public health advisor and publicly toes the party line, while she yearns for France. Her budding friendship with Sasha, a champion swimmer recently thrown out of the local team, becomes a vehicle of possible escape. As she helps him train in order to regain his position on the team, they see an opportunity to go to the West for the European championships, and help them both towards liberation. Marie gains a job working to iron costumes for the military choir in Kyiv.

Maria and Alexei fall out after he publicly thanks the Soviet government and she is furious. Alexei then reveals that he has slept with a neighbor, Olga, because Marie has become distant and the other woman 'looks at him differently' than the resentment he constantly gets from Marie. She throws him out and he begins to live in the neighboring room with Olga.

Sasha wins the trials and is selected for the championships in Vienna. After the selection, he spends the night with Marie. Soon after, Marie's letters to her French family are discovered in his bags and his coach warns her to stay away. Sasha goes to a training camp by the Black Sea.

While away for training, Sasha arranges for himself to be smuggled on a ship out of the USSR and needs money to pay for it. Marie obtains the money and comes to the port city with the military choir. The ship captain at first tries to go back on the agreement, but then explains that he can't come close to shore, so Sasha attempts to swim six hours out to meet him far offshore. Marie is brutally interrogated by the same KGB official she first met when she came to the USSR. A French magazine article reveals that Sasha was successful in escaping to the West, Marie is implicated and jailed for six years.

Upon her release, her now teenage son and husband come to receive her. She reconciles with Alexei, and he promises her he still loves her. Two years later they are in a delegation to Sofia, Bulgaria where Alexei reveals to Marie that he has arranged for her escape over the intervening years by writing to the actress Gabrielle. Marie and her son escape with Gabrielle to the French embassy. Alexei is arrested for complicity and sent to be a medic in a Gulag in Sakhalin. With the advent of glasnost in the Soviet Union he finally returns to France in 1987.

== Cast ==
- Sandrine Bonnaire as Marie Golovina
- Oleg Menshikov as Alexey Golovin
- Catherine Deneuve as Gabrielle Devele
- Sergei Bodrov Jr. as Sasha Vasilyev
- Grigori Manoukov as Pirogov
- Tatyana Dogileva as Olga
- Bohdan Stupka as Colonel Boyko
- Hubert Saint-Macary as embassy advisor
- Atanass Atanassov as Viktor
- Valentin Ganev as Volodya Petrov
- Ruben Tapiero as Seryozha, age 7
- Erwan Baynaud as Seryozha, age 14
- Meglena Karalambova as Nina Fyodorovna
- Tania Massalitinova as Anastasia Aleksandrovna
- Nikolai Binev (credited as Nikolaï Binev) as Sergei Kozlov
- René Féret as Ambassadeur de France
- Daniel Martin as Turkish Captain
- Hubert Saint-Macary as Embassy Advisor
- Jauris Casanova as Fabiani
- Yuriy Yakovlev (credited as Youri Yakovlev) as Vieil Homme Kommonalka
- Viara Tabakova as Epouse de l'ivrogne
- Dimitar Nikolov as Chauffeur camion

== Reception ==
=== Critical response ===
East/West has an approval rating of 65% on review aggregator website Rotten Tomatoes, based on 31 reviews, and an average rating of 6.5/10. On Metacritic, the film has a weighted average score of 61 out of 100, based on 27 critics, indicating "generally favorable reviews"

=== Awards ===
Nominated

- 1999 Golden Globes: Best Foreign Language Film
- 1999 César Awards:

Best Film
Best Actress: Sandrine Bonnaire
Best Director: Regis Wargnier
Best Music: Patrick Doyle

- 1999 Academy Awards: Nominated for Best Foreign Language Film — Regis Wargnier
- 1999 National Board of Review Awards: Best Foreign Film

Won

- 2000 Miami International Film Festival: Audience Award
- 2000 Palm Springs International Film Festival: Audience Award
- 2000 Santa Barbara International Film Festival: Audience Choice Award

== See also ==
- List of submissions to the 72nd Academy Awards for Best Foreign Language Film
- List of French submissions for the Academy Award for Best Foreign Language Film
