= Without Fear or Blame =

- Directed by: Gérard Jugnot
- Written by: Gérard Jugnot; Christian Biegalski; Jean-Bernard Pouy
- Produced by: António da Cunha Telles; Jean-Claude Fleury
- Starring: Gérard Jugnot; Rémi Martin; Roland Giraud; Gérard Darmon; Victoria Abril; Ticky Holgado; Martin Lamotte; Anémone; Josiane Balasko; Michel Blanc; Patrick Timsit
- Cinematography: Gérard de Battista
- Edited by: Catherine Kelber
- Music by: Yves de Bujadoux
- Production companies: TF1 Films Production; Arturo Productions; G.P.F.I. Images Investissements; Investimage; Slav II; Sofimage
- Distributed by: AMLF
- Release date: 14 December 1988
- Running time: 100 minutes
- Country: France
- Language: French
- Box office: $3.1 million

Without Fear or Blame or Sans peur et sans reproche is a French comedy film released in 1988. The film is directed by Gérard Jugnot.

== Plot ==
At the end of the fifteenth century, the armies of King Charles VIII go through Italy to conquer the Kingdom of Naples. Bellabre, one of the French captains, is defeated and ridiculed in a parade tournament by a young unknown, Pierre Terrail de Bayard. He takes the young man under his control, to take revenge by making him know the harsh reality of war. But very quickly the aging Bellabre is overshadowed by the feats of the young warrior; he decided to devote himself to the glory that will become the Bayard knight without fear and without reproach.

== Cast ==
- Gérard Jugnot as Bellabre
- Rémi Martin as Pierre Terrail de Bayard
- Roland Giraud as Sottomayor
- Gérard Darmon as Jacques de Mailles
- Victoria Abril as Jeanne
- Ann-Gisel Glass as Blanche de Savoie
- Ticky Holgado as Mignard de Parthode
- Martin Lamotte as Louis XII
- Anémone as Rose
- Josiane Balasko as A handmaid
- Michel Blanc as Verdiglione
- Patrick Timsit as Charles VIII
- Gérard Klein as De Fougas
- Jean-Louis Foulquier as Louis d'Ars
- Romain Bouteille as François de Paule
- Bruno Carette as Grégoire
- Carole Brenner as Bernardine
- Alain Doutey as D'Urfé
