= Hubert Saint-Macary =

French actor (born 1949)

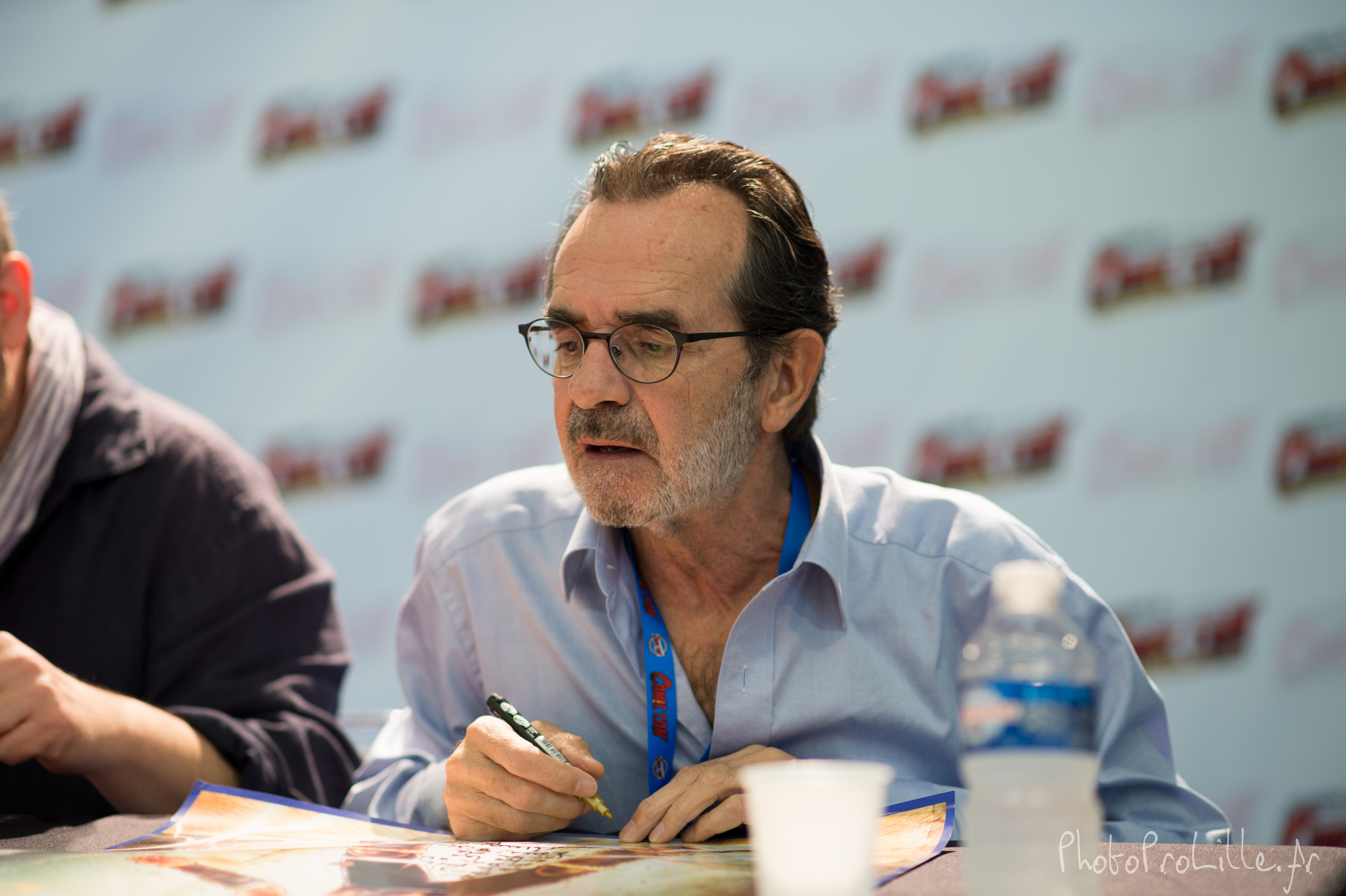
- Hubert Saint-Macary in 2013
- Born: 18 May 1949 (age 76); Orléans, France
- Occupation: Actor
- Years active: 1975–present
- Relatives: Xavier Saint-Macary (brother)

Hubert Saint-Macary (born 18 May 1949) is a French actor. He is the brother of Xavier Saint-Macary.

== Selected filmography ==
- Un étrange voyage (1981) – the examiner
- Stella (1983) – Lomy
- Debout les crabes, la mer monte! (1983) – Le timide
- Dangerous Moves (1984) – Foldes
- Ote-toi de mon soleil (1984) – Hubert
- La femme secrète (1986) – Eric
- Didi Drives Me Crazy (1986) – Chemiker
- May Fools (1990) – Paul
- Mr. and Mrs. Bridge (1990) – Copyist in the Louvre
- Cold Moon (1991) – Un consommateur au bistrot
- Indochine (1992) – Raymond
- L'instinct de l'ange (1993) – Capitaine Georges
- Montparnasse-Pondichéry (1994)
- Casque bleu (1994) – Gianni
- Les Milles (1995) – Locomotive mechanic
- Le journal du séducteur (1996) – Hubert, the Psychiatrist
- The Proprietor (1996) – Paris – Taxi Driver
- Fallait pas!... (1996)
- Genealogies of a Crime (1997) – Verret
- Lucie Aubrac (1997) – Dr. Dugoujon
- Disparus (1998) – L'informateur
- Si je t'aime... prends garde à toi (1998) – Nicolas
- East/West (1999) – Embassy Advisor
- L'ami du jardin (1999) – J.A. Kharavasnapour – le psy
- Crime Scenes (2000) – M. Bourgoin
- Six-Pack (2000) – Charcot
- Most Promising Young Actress (2000) – Loïck
- Ça ira mieux demain (2000) – Eric
- Monsieur Batignole (2002) – Gendarmerie lieutenant
- The Adversary (2002) – Dr. Lantier
- The Bourne Identity (2002) – Morgue Boss
- Sweat (2002) – Grease-Monkey
- Une employée modèle (2002) – Charles
- Toutes les filles sont folles (2003) – Michaux
- En territoire indien (2003) – Le capitaine de gendarmerie
- The Overeater (2003) – Le juge Salabert
- Les amateurs (2003) – Deschamps
- Je suis votre homme (2004) – Le prêtre
- Pour le plaisir (2004) – Marcel
- San-Antonio (2004) – M. Chapon
- Man to Man (2005) – Comte de Verchemont
- Boudu (2005) – Bob
- Il ne faut jurer... de rien! (2005) – Le contremaître
- Palais royal! (2005) – Le directeur de la maison de retraite
- Nina's House (2005) – Le chef de gare
- J'ai vu tuer Ben Barka (2005) – Médecin légiste
- Comedy of Power (2006) – Le directeur de la prison
- Hell (2006) – Le père de Sybille
- Gomez vs. Tavarès (2007) – Le ministre
- A Girl Cut in Two (2007) – Bernard Violet
- Paris (2008) – Le cardiologue
- Cash (2008) – Leblanc
- Hero Corp (2008–2017, TV Series)
- Rose et Noir (2009) – L'avocat
- L'enfance du mal (2010) – L'avocat
- 600 kilos d'or pur (2010) – Duval
- La croisière (2011) – Le médecin
- Un jour mon père viendra (2012) – Le chef cuisinier
- Parlez-moi de vous (2012) – Directeur Radio France
- La Danse de l'Albatros (2012) - Gilles, for which Saint-Macary won the prize for Best Actor at the 2012 Luchon Festival
- I Kissed a Girl (2015) – Le prof d'université
- Through the Air (2015) – Le voisin d'Armand
- C'est beau la vie quand on y pense (2017) – Pierre
- Ami-ami (2018) – Henri, le père de Vincent
