= Actors (2000 film) =

2000 film

- Film poster
- Directed by: Bertrand Blier
- Written by: Bertrand Blier
- Produced by: Christine Gozlan; Alain Sarde
- Starring: Pierre Arditi; Josiane Balasko; Jean-Paul Belmondo; François Berléand; Dominique Blanc; Jean-Claude Brialy; Albert Dupontel; André Dussollier; Jean-Pierre Marielle; Michel Piccoli; Claude Rich; Michel Serrault; Jacques Villeret
- Cinematography: François Catonné
- Edited by: Claudine Merlin
- Music by: Martial Solal
- Production companies: Canal+ TF1 Films Production; Les Films Alain Sarde; Planete A
- Distributed by: BAC Films
- Release date: 5 April 2000
- Running time: 103 minutes
- Country: France
- Language: French
- Budget: $10.7 million
- Box office: $3.1 million

Actors (original title: Les Acteurs) is a 2000 French comedy film directed by Bertrand Blier.

== Plot ==
A collection of portraits of actors (exclusively men, with the exception of Josiane Balasko interpreting André Dussollier) meet and tell their stories in a more or less structured manner. They describe their craft with a certain ironic distance.

== Cast ==
- Pierre Arditi as himself
- Claude Rich as himself
- Josiane Balasko as André Dussollier 2
- Jean-Paul Belmondo as himself
- François Berléand as François Nègre
- Dominique Blanc as Geneviève
- Claude Brasseur as himself
- Jean-Claude Brialy as himself
- Alain Delon as himself
- Gérard Depardieu as himself
- Albert Dupontel as the cop
- Serge Riaboukine as the motorcycle cop
- André Dussollier as himself
- Jacques François as himself
- Sami Frey as himself
- Michel Galabru as the killed actor
- Ticky Holgado as the tramp
- Michael Lonsdale as the man on the street
- Jean-Pierre Marielle as himself
- Patachou as the blind lady
- Michel Piccoli as himself
- Maria Schneider as herself
- Michel Serrault as himself
- Jean Topart as the filmmaker
- Jacques Villeret as himself
- Jean Yanne as Dr. Belgoder
- Bertrand Blier as himself
- Franck de la Personne as a client
- François Morel as the autograph's man
- Laurent Gamelon as the taxi driver
- Michel Vuillermoz as the nurse
- Marie-Christine Adam
- Éric Prat

== Release ==
The film was screened at the Mar del Plata International Film Festival in Argentina in 2001.
