= Daniel Martin (actor) =

French actor (1951/1952 – 2024)

Daniel Martin (1951/1952 – 7 March 2024) was a French actor known for his roles in Le Dîner de Cons, East/West, Most Promising Young Actress. He died on 7 March 2024, at the age of 72.

After graduation from the Paris Conservatory, he started his career under Antoine Vitez and played at the 1978 Avignon Festival. From then he played in dozens of main theater plays with among others Karl Valentin. He also played in dozens of films and television series.
