= Bjarni Haukur Þórsson =

Icelandic author, director, producer and actor

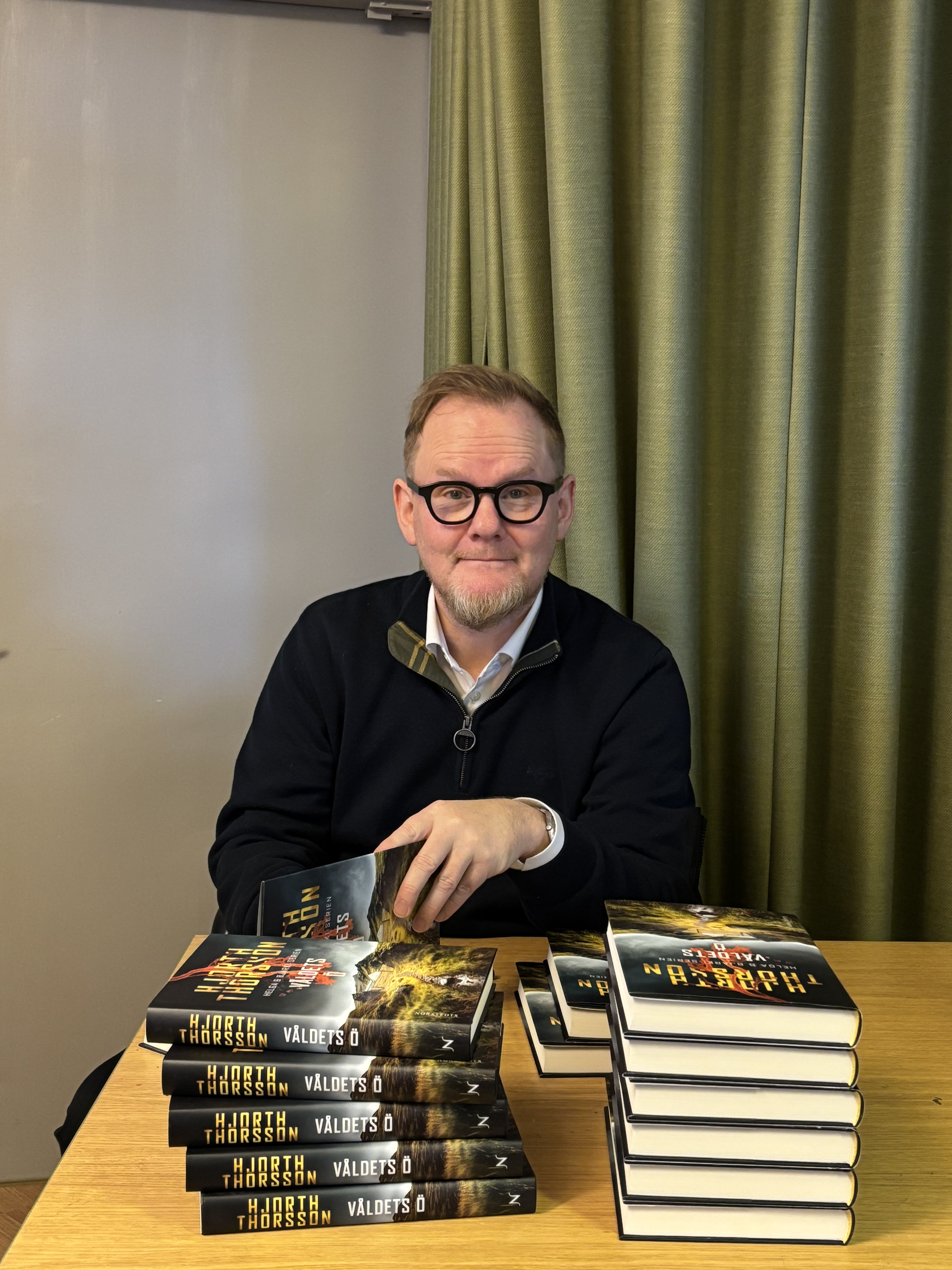
- Bjarni Haukur Þórsson in Stockholm, 2026
- Born: April 20, 1971 (age 55); Reykjavík, Iceland
- Occupations: Author, director, producer, playwright, actor

Bjarni Haukur Þórsson (born April 20, 1971), also known internationally as Bjarni Thorsson, is an Icelandic author, director, producer, playwright and actor. He is the founder of Thorsson Productions. Since 1996, his production company has developed and produced more than 60 theatrical and broadcast productions worldwide.

== Early life and education ==
Thorsson was born in Reykjavík, Iceland.

He studied acting at the American Academy of Dramatic Arts in New York and later attended the NYU Tisch School of the Arts. He also holds an MBA degree from Reykjavík University.

== Career ==
Thorsson began his career in theatre in the 1990s, directing stage productions in Iceland and later internationally. His early work includes directing Master Class by Terrence McNally at the Icelandic Opera in 1996, and Trainspotting by Irvine Welsh at Loftkastalinn Theatre in Reykjavík in 1997.

In 1998, he performed in the Icelandic production of Defending the Caveman by Rob Becker, which premiered at the Icelandic Opera. The production ran for several years and was widely attended, with estimates suggesting it was seen by a significant proportion of the Icelandic population.

Thorsson later expanded his work internationally as both a playwright and director. His play The Dad (Pappa) premiered in Norway and received positive reviews.

His work has also been staged in Germany, including Der Opa, which premiered at the Tivoli Theater in Hamburg in 2013, starring Karl Dall.

He is also known for adapting literary works for the stage. In 2017, he directed a stage adaptation of A Man Called Ove by Fredrik Backman.

Thorsson created and performed in the solo stage production How to Become Icelandic in 60 Minutes, which premiered at Harpa Concert Hall in 2012. The show combines humour and cultural observation and has been performed over 1,000 times..

In addition to theatre, Thorsson has worked in film and television. He directed the feature film The Grandad, which premiered in Reykjavík in 2013. He also created and wrote the Norwegian sitcom Hos Martin (Martin’s Place), which aired on TV2 from 2004 to 2005. The series was later adapted for Swedish television as Hon och Hannes.

Alongside his work in theatre and television, Thorsson is an author. His novels have been published internationally by publishers including Norstedts Förlag and Rowohlt. In 2025, he began a collaboration with Michael Hjorth on a crime fiction series set in Iceland, centred on the investigators Helga and Bjarki.

== Novels ==
Thorsson has written four novels, published in multiple languages and territories.

- Hi Dad! (2013), published by Heyne Verlag (Penguin Random House), released in German, Icelandic and Estonian.
- Þrúður Þruma (Thunder Trud) (2022), published by Daldrandi Publishing.
- Våldets Ö (2026), published by Norstedts Förlag, with international editions in multiple countries including Germany, the Netherlands, Norway, Finland and Sweden.
- Fiskarens Död (2026), published by Norstedts Förlag, with international editions in multiple countries including Germany, the Netherlands, Norway, Finland and Sweden.

== Productions (selection) ==
- Moi Papa? (The Dad) by Bjarni Haukur Thorsson, directed by Sébastien Azzopardi, with Arthur Jugnot, Théâtre du Splendid, Paris, 2018
- Ja, Tata (The Dad) by Bjarni Haukur Thorsson, directed by Boris Kovačević, with Rakan Rushaidat, Teatar Exit, Zagreb, 2011
- Il Papà (The Dad) by Bjarni Haukur Thorsson, directed by Marco Di Stefano, with Giulio Settimo, Ivan Zajc Croatian National Theatre, Rijeka 2024
