= French Twist (film) =

- Theatrical release poster
- Directed by: Josiane Balasko
- Written by: Josiane Balasko; Patrick Aubrée; Telsche Boorman
- Produced by: Pierre Grunstein; Claude Berri
- Starring: Victoria Abril; Josiane Balasko; Alain Chabat
- Cinematography: Gérard de Battista
- Edited by: Claudine Merlin; Kako Kelber (co-editor)
- Music by: Manuel Malou
- Distributed by: AMLF
- Release date: 8 February 1995
- Running time: 104 minutes
- Country: France
- Language: French
- Budget: $7 million
- Box office: $75.2 million

French Twist (French: Gazon maudit) is a 1995 French comedy cult film written and directed by Josiane Balasko. It is among the few French films that have released a dubbed version for English-speaking audiences. Its title in French is untranslatable but 'Cursed Lawn' is a close approximation. It also refers to the shaving (or not) of pubic hair, a subtle joke in French alluding to the subject matter of the film.

French Twist was selected as France's entry for the Best Foreign Language Film at the 68th Academy Awards, but was not accepted as a nominee.

== Plot ==
Laurent (Alain Chabat) and Loli (Victoria Abril) are a thirty-ish married couple living in southern France with their young children. He is an estate agent; she is a housewife. Laurent has extramarital affairs.

Loli is unaware that her husband is unfaithful. Then one day, a campervan breaks down in front of their house. The driver is Marie-Jo (Josiane Balasko), a 40s-ish butch lesbian who works as a DJ. She asks to use their phone. Loli has a blocked sink, so in exchange for using the phone, Marie-Jo gets Loli's drain back in working order. Loli and Marie-Jo begin an affair. Laurent is upset, but then his friend Antoine (Ticky Holgado) accidentally reveals Laurent's philandering to Loli. This seems to justify her romance. Marie-Jo moves into the house.

Antoine then suggests that Laurent let Loli have her way, cease all hostility, and wait for the affair to burn out. Laurent agrees, and the household becomes a seemingly idyllic ménage à trois. But his strategy has its effect, especially after another lesbian couple, old friends of Marie-Jo, happen by. Laurent welcomes them, but Loli becomes annoyed and jealous.

Marie-Jo decides that the situation is not really going to work. She knows that Laurent wants her to leave. While Loli is away on a trip, Marie-Jo makes a deal with Laurent. She will break up with Loli and leave immediately, if Laurent will give her something she has wanted for years: a baby. Laurent has sex with Marie-Jo to get her pregnant, and Marie-Jo departs before Loli returns. Laurent tells Loli nothing, as agreed with Marie-Jo.

Laurent and Loli settle back down to their old life, but their relationship has been deeply affected. Then Loli hears from a mutual acquaintance that Marie-Jo is living in Paris and is several months pregnant. Loli is astonished and shocked. She insists that she and Laurent go to Paris and contact Marie-Jo. They find her working as a DJ in a lesbian dance club. Their intrusion provokes a quarrel with the club owner, who fires Marie-Jo. Loli and Laurent take her back to their home, where she has her baby.

The ménage à trois is re-established, with the two mothers caring for their children. As Laurent goes to buy a bigger house, he finds the seller, a handsome Spaniard (Miguel Bosé), in his swimming pool. The two then share a breakfast while gazing into each other's eyes, and they share a kiss by the pool.

== Cast ==
- Victoria Abril as Loli
- Josiane Balasko as Marie-Jo
- Alain Chabat as Laurent
- Ticky Holgado as Antoine
- Catherine Hiegel as Dany
- Michèle Bernier as Solange
- Catherine Samie as The Prostitute
- Katrine Boorman as Emily Crumble
- Miguel Bosé as Diego
- Blanca Li as a Client

== Development ==
Josiane Balasko called making a film involving lesbianism "a difficult challenge, since all I had as references on the subject were movies made mostly by men about men; male homosexuality has been shown on the screen thoroughly, unlike lesbianism, which has been kept silent and taboo."

The film was presented to the Chicago International Film Festival, in October 1995.

With her nomination to the César Award for Best Director, Josiane Balasko is the sixth woman in history to be nominated in this category, after Ariane Mnouchkine, Agnès Varda, Coline Serreau, Christine Pascal and Nicole Garcia.

== Reception ==
=== Critical response ===
French Twist has an approval rating of 62% on review aggregator website Rotten Tomatoes, based on 13 reviews, and an average rating of 6.3/10.

=== Awards ===
Award	Category	Recipient	Result
53rd Golden Globe Awards	Best Foreign Language Film	Josiane Balasko	Nominated
21st César Awards	Best Film	Josiane Balasko	Nominated
21st César Awards	Best Actor	Alain Chabat	Nominated
21st César Awards	Best Supporting Actor	Ticky Holgado	Nominated
21st César Awards	Best Director	Josiane Balasko	Nominated
21st César Awards	Best Original Screenplay or Adaptation	Josiane Balasko and Telsche Boorman	Won
Lumiere Awards	Best Screenplay	Josiane Balasko	Won
Palm Springs International Film Festival	Audience Award - Best Foreign Language Film	Josiane Balasko	Won
GLAAD Media Award	Outstanding Film – Limited Release	Josiane Balasko	Nominated
Festival du Film Francophone	In Competition	Josiane Balasko	Nominated

== See also ==
- List of submissions to the 68th Academy Awards for Best Foreign Language Film
- List of French submissions for the Academy Award for Best Foreign Language Film
