= Pinot simple flic =

- Directed by: Gérard Jugnot
- Written by: Gérard Jugnot; Christian Biegalski; Pierre Geller
- Produced by: Jean-Claude Fleury
- Starring: Gérard Jugnot; Fanny Bastien
- Cinematography: Eduardo Serra
- Edited by: Catherine Kelber
- Music by: Louis Chedid
- Distributed by: AMLF
- Release date: 6 June 1984 (France)
- Running time: 86 minutes
- Country: France
- Language: French

Pinot simple flic is a 1984 French crime-comedy film directed by Gérard Jugnot.

== Plot ==
The film starts in the 13th arrondissement of Paris in 1984. Robert Pinot is a police officer as ordinary as clumsy. One day, he stops a certain Josyane, a young drug addict who is also doubled as a pickpocket, nicknamed Marylou. Having discovered that she comes from the same village, Nanteuil, he takes compassion for the young girl and decides to take her under his wing to keep her away from Tony, a dangerous dealer with whom she is in love.

== Cast ==
- Gérard Jugnot as Robert Pinot
- Fanny Bastien as Josyane Krawczyk / Marylou
- Patrick Fierry as Tony
- Pierre Mondy as Rochu
- Jean-Claude Brialy as Morcy
- Jean Rougerie as Vaudreuil
- Gérard Loussine as Blanchard
- Claire Magnin as Craquette
- Jean-Claude Islert as Grimaldi
- Dane Porret as Ferrand
- Alain Doutey as Jeoffroy
- Pascal Légitimus as Tom
- Raymond Aquilon as Dom
- Carole Jacquinot as Ziton
- Sim as Vénus, the photographer
- Christophe Clark (dubbed by Martin Lamotte) as Cricri (uncredited)
- Brigitte Verbecq as Brigitte (uncredited)
- Pierre Frag as Bertrand, the owner patron of the sex-shop
- Jean-Claude Bouillaud as the policeman in the bus
- Philippe Klébert as the thug
- Didier Kaminka as the tramp
- Patrice Leconte as the man with glasses in the metro
- Charles Nemes as the drunk man in the prison
- Jean-Marie Poiré as the man with walkman in the metro
- Dominique Reymond

== About the film ==
- It is the first film directed by Gérard Jugnot, who will direct Scout toujours... the next year.
- The film poster is a parody of First Blood, where Gérard Jugnot appears at the middle of the picture with torn clothes, a band on the cap and holding an M60 machine gun like Sylvester Stallone.
- The following film directors briefly appeared in the film :
  - Charles Nemes (Heroes Are Not Wet Behind the Ears) as the drunk man who repetitively shouts "présent" in the prison of the police station;
  - Patrice Leconte (French Fried Vacation) as the man in the metro bothered by the smell of Pinot;
  - Jean-Marie Poiré (Santa Claus Is a Stinker) as the man with the walkman in the metro, who does not see Pinot being aggressed at only a few meters from him.
- The film ends with a mise en abyme. Gérard Jugnot who plays Pinot is in a police van, while the vehicle starts, the plan gets bigger and the technical team, directed by Gérard Jugnot, is filming the sequence.
