= Gérard de Battista =

French cinematographer

Gérard de Battista (París, 1946 is a cinematographer who had a long relationship with the Spanish actress Victoria Abril. They have two sons together, one born in 1990 (Martín) and another one in 1992 (Félix). He was notably the cinematographer for Josiane Balasko’s Gazon maudit and Tonie Marshall’s Vénus Beauté (Institut).

== Partial filmography ==
- Sans peur et sans reproche (1988), directed by Gérard Jugnot
- French Twist (1995), directed by Josiane Balasko
- Venus Beauty Institute (1998), directed by Tonie Marshall
- Un grand cri d'amour (1998), directed by Josiane Balasko
- Le Grand Charles (2006), directed by Bernard Stora (TV Mini-Series)
- Ashes and Blood (2009), directed by Fanny Ardant
- What War May Bring (2010), directed by Claude Lelouch
- Thérèse Desqueyroux (2012 film) (2012), directed by Claude Miller
