= Arthur Jugnot =

French actor and stage director (born 1980)

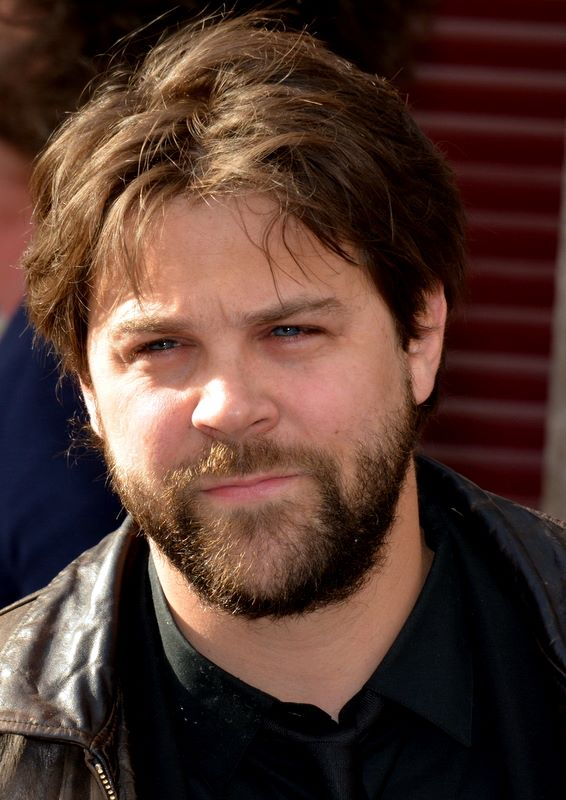
- Jugnot in 2014
- Born: 2 December 1980 (age 45); Paris, France
- Occupations: Actor, stage director
- Years active: 2000–present

Arthur Jugnot (French: [aʁtyʁ ʒyɲo]; born 2 December 1980) is a French actor and stage director.

== Career ==
He made his on-screen debut on Most Promising Young Actress, directed by Gérard Jugnot. In 2002, he also have a role in Monsieur Batignole, again directed by his father.

In 2009, he is nominated to the Molière Award for Best Supporting Actor for his role in the play Chat en poche, directed by Pierre Laville.

== Personal life ==
He is the son of Gérard Jugnot and Cécile Magnan.

In the mid-2000s, he was in couple with actress Salomé Lelouch, the daughter of Claude Lelouch and Évelyne Bouix.

In 2006, he was in a relationship with singer and actress Cécilia Cara. They had a little boy, Célestin, born on March 28, 2013. They broke-up in 2015.

He married the actress Flavie Péan on June 25, 2022.

== Filmography ==
Year	Title	Role	Director	Notes
2000	Most Promising Young Actress	Alex	Gérard Jugnot	
2000	Le jour de grâce	Soldier	Jérôme Salle	Short
2001	Objectif bac	Jérôme Balfond	Patrick Volson	TV movie
2002	Monsieur Batignole	Arthur	Gérard Jugnot	
2002	La maîtresse en maillot de bain	The waiter	Lyèce Boukhitine	
2003	Les grands frères	Florian	Henri Helman	TV movie
2004	Grande École	Chouquet	Robert Salis	
2004	S.O.S. 18	Lucas	Jacques Malaterre	TV series (1 episode)
2005	Cavalcade	Soraya's friend	Steve Suissa	
2005	Avant qu'il ne soit trop tard	Grégory	Laurent Dussaux	
2005	Mademoiselle Navarro	Arno Loffeur	Jean Sagols	TV movie
2005	Le juge est une femme	Guillaume Carayou	Christian Bonnet	TV series (1 episode)
2006	You Are So Beautiful	Pierre	Isabelle Mergault	
2006	French Fried Vacation 3	Benjamin Morin	Patrice Leconte	
2006	Laura, le compte à rebours a commencé	Mathieu	Jean-Teddy Filippe	TV mini-series
2007	Les fourmis rouges	Hector	Stéphan Carpiaux	
2007	Je suis femmosexuel... et toi ?	Jean	Casas Olivier	Short
2008	Duval et Moretti	Nico Moretti	Dominique Guillo	TV series (1 episode)
2009	Rose et noir	King Henry III	Gérard Jugnot	
2009	Éternelle	Martin	Didier Delaître	TV series (6 episodes)
2010	Les princes de la nuit	Seb	Patrick Levy	
2010	L'arche de Babel	Paul Di Stefano	Philippe Carrèse	TV movie
2010	Vidocq: Le Masque et la Plume	Marcelin	Alain Choquart	TV movie
2010	Josephine, Guardian Angel	Yann	Jean-Marc Seban	TV series (1 episode)
2011	Chez Maupassant	Jean-Nicolas Lougère	Laurent Heynemann	TV series (1 episode)
2012	Toussaint Louverture	Pasquier	Philippe Niang	TV mini-series
2013	Nos chers voisins	Father Raphaël	Emmanuel Rigaut	TV series (1 episode)
2014	Macadam Baby	Grégoire	Patrick Bossard	
2014	Vaugand	David Finkel	Charlotte Brandström & Manuel Boursinhac	TV series (3 episodes)
2015	Deux au carré	Fabien	Philippe Dajoux	
2015	Cherif	Cédric Leroy	Pierric Gantelmi d'Ille	TV series (1 episode)
2016	Venise sous la neige	Jean-Luc	Elliott Covrigaru	
2017	C'est beau la vie quand on y pense	The cyclist	Gérard Jugnot	
2017	Juste un regard	Daniel	Ludovic Colbeau-Justin	TV mini-series
2018	Nina	Nathan	Éric Le Roux	TV series (1 episode)
2018	Camping paradis	Zacharie	Stéphane Kopecky	TV series (1 episode)
2021	Pour te retrouver	Tristan Mercadal	Bruno Garcia	TV movie
2021	Crimes Parfaits	Adrien	David Ferrier	TV series (1 episode)
2022	La dégustation	The newborn father	Ivan Calbérac	
2022	Les vieux fourneaux 2	The nephew	Christophe Duthuron	
2022	Cassandre	Raphaël Delmont	Pascale Guerre	TV series (1 episode)
2022	I3P	Adrien Bloch	Jérémy Minui	TV series (2 episodes)

== Theatre ==
=== As actor ===
Year	Title	Author	Director	Notes
2000	Bal Trap	Xavier Durringer	Sandrine Rigaux	
2004	Kiss Me Like You Mean It	Chris Chibnall	Stephan Meldegg	
2006	La Sœur de Jerry King	Jack Neary	Arnaud Lemort	
2008-10	Chat en poche	Georges Feydeau	Pierre Laville	Nominated - Molière Award for Best Supporting Actor
2010-12	À deux lits du délit	Derek Benfield	Jean-Luc Moreau	
2011-15	Une semaine...pas plus !	Clément Michel	Arthur Jugnot & David Roussel	
2013	Le plus heureux des trois	Eugène Labiche	Didier Long	
2015-16	La Dame Blanche	Sacha Danino & Sébastien Azzopardi	Sébastien Azzopardi	
2018-20	Moi papa?	Bjarni Haukur Þórsson	Sébastien Azzopardi	
2019-21	Père ou fils	Clément Michel	Arthur Jugnot & David Roussel	
2021	Le Jour du kiwi	Laetitia Colombani	Ladislas Chollat	
2022-23	Black Comedy	Peter Shaffer	Grégory Barco	
2023-24	Le Jour du kiwi	Laetitia Colombani	Ladislas Chollat	

=== As director ===
Year	Title	Author
2003	Fric-Frac et Mic-Mac	Dominique-Pierre Devers
2003	Commandeur et Goude	Jérôme Commandeur & Paulo Goude
2005-09	Magicien(s) Tout Est Écrit	Sébastien Mossière, Mathieu Sinclair, Jean-Luc Bertrand & Julien Labigne
2010-11	Le Carton	Clément Michel
2011	Magicien(s) Tout Est Écrit	Sébastien Mossière, Mathieu Sinclair, Jean-Luc Bertrand & Julien Labigne
2011	iMagic	Bertran Lotth
2011-15	Une semaine...pas plus !	Clément Michel
2012-14	Les grands moyens	Stéphane Belaïsch & Thomas Perrier
2013	Steptoe and Son	Ray Galton & John Antrobus
2014	Le Carton	Clément Michel
2014-15	Door on the Left as You Leave the Elevator	Gérard Lauzier
2015	Une chance inestimable	Fabrice Donnio
2015-18	Le Fusible	Sylvain Meyniac
2016	Pour cent briques t'as plus rien maintenant !	Didier Kaminka
2017-20	MagicBox	Jean-Luc Bertrand, Arthur Jugnot & Romain Thunin
2018	Où est Jean-Louis?	Gaëlle Gauthier
2019	Funny Money	Ray Cooney
2019-21	Père ou fils	Clément Michel
2019-22	Romantics Anonymous	Jean-Pierre Améris & Philippe Blasband
2019-22	Les 1001 Vies des Urgences	Baptiste Beaulieu
2021-23	Saint-Exupéry	Arthur Jugnot & Flavie Pean
2022	MagicBox	Jean-Luc Bertrand, Arthur Jugnot & Romain Thunin
2023	Funny Money	Ray Cooney
2023	God of Carnage	Yasmina Reza
2023-24	Denver, le dernier dinosaure	Arthur Jugnot & Guillaume Bouchède
