= Monsieur Batignole =

- Directed by: Gérard Jugnot
- Written by: Gérard Jugnot; Philippe Lopes-Curval
- Produced by: Gérard Jugnot; Olivier Granier; Dominique Farrugia
- Starring: Gérard Jugnot; Michèle Garcia; Jules Sitruk; Jean-Paul Rouve; Götz Burger; Alexia Portal
- Cinematography: Gérard Simon
- Edited by: Catherine Kelber
- Music by: Khalil Chahine
- Distributed by: BAC Films
- Release date: 6 March 2002
- Running time: 100 minutes
- Country: France
- Budget: $10.4 million
- Box office: $9 million

Monsieur Batignole is a French film released in 2002. The film depicts the story of a grocer, Edmond Batignole, who helps the young son of his Jewish neighbour and the boy's cousins to reach the safety of Switzerland. The film was directed by Gérard Jugnot and featured Gérard Jugnot, Jules Sitruk, Jean-Paul Rouve, Götz Burger, Michèle Garcia and Alexia Portal in lead roles.

== Plot ==
In 1942 occupied Paris, a butcher, Edmond Batignole, and his family are living on the ground floor of an apartment building. His daughter is soon to be married and his intended son-in-law, aspiring writer Pierre-Jean, wants the large penthouse apartment occupied by a Jewish family, the Bernsteins, and alerts the Gestapo who arrest the family.

When the property is confiscated, the Batignoles apply for and are awarded the apartment and cater a birthday party for SS officers in it. During the party, young Simon Bernstein returns, having escaped at a railway station. Batignole hides him in the servant's room of the apartment on the top floor but soon moves him to the cellar to avoid his discovery. Simon is joined in the cellar by his two cousins, who themselves were being hidden by the concierge of another apartment building.

Edmond tries to find someone to smuggle the children to Switzerland but eventually decides to take them himself. They undertake the dangerous trip to the border. At one point Batignole, who is only impersonating a doctor, manages to fix the dislocated knee of German official. Later Batignole is arrested after Simon is overheard mentioning Yom Kippur. Batignole then makes an impassioned speech against French antisemitsm. Simon creates a diversion and they are able to escape. However, with the help of a sympathetic woman and a priest, they are able to reach safety in Switzerland.

At the end of the film it is revealed that the three children were never able to reunite with their parents.

== Cast ==
- Jules Sitruk - Simon Bernstein
- Michèle Garcia - Marguerite Batignole
- Gérard Jugnot - Edmond Batignole
- Jean-Paul Rouve - Pierre-Jean Lamour
- Alexia Portal - Micheline Batignole
- Arthur Jugnot - Arthur
- Jean-Marie Winling - Sacha Guitry
- Marie-Hélène Lentini - Madame Taillepied
- Violette Blanckaert - Sarah Cohen
- Daphné Baiwir - Guila Cohen
- Götz Burger - SS Col. Spreich

== Reception ==
Variety's critic Lisa Nesselson wrote that the director "has fashioned a fine package, ready to travel". The film was a box office success in France. The 2002 French Academy of Cinema Best Young Actor award was won by Jean-Paul Rouve in this film. The film was shown at VCU French Film Festival, Cleveland International Film Festival, French Film Festival, Bergen International Film Festival where it once again received huge critical acclaim.
