= Éric Prat =

French actor

- Born: 14 March 1956 (age 70); Tokyo, Japan
- Occupation: Actor
- Years active: 1980–present

Éric Prat (born 14 March 1956) is a French actor. He appeared in more than ninety films since 1980.

== Selected filmography ==
Film
Year	Title	Role	Notes
2009	Park Benches		
2008	Paris 36		
2008	La très très grande entreprise		
2006	OSS 117: Cairo, Nest of Spies		
2006	Les Brigades du Tigre		
2004	Saint Ange		
2000	Les Acteurs		
1994	La Cité de la peur		
1990	Tatie Danielle		
