= Gérard Jugnot =

French actor, director and screenwriter (born 1951)

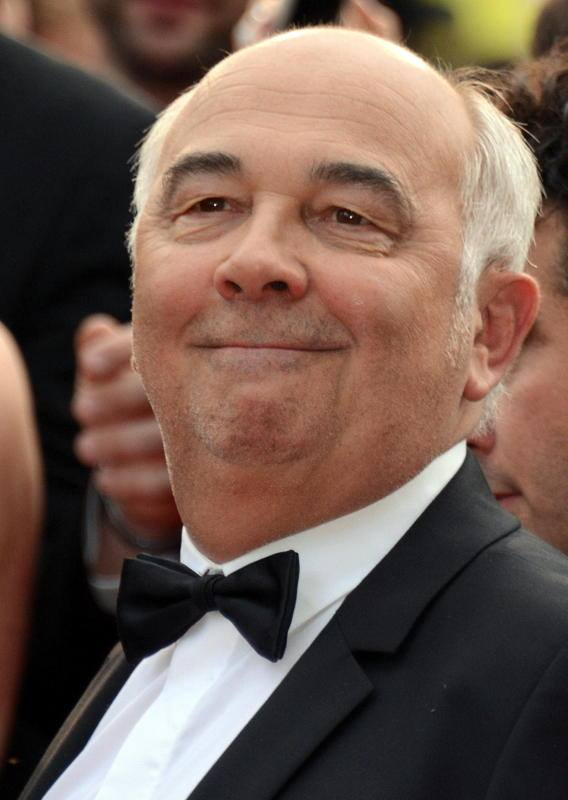
- Jugnot in 2014
- Born: Gérard Jean Jugnot; 4 May 1951 (age 75); Paris, France
- Occupations: Actor; film director; screenwriter; film producer
- Years active: 1973–present

Gérard Jugnot (French pronunciation: [ʒeʁaʁ ʒyɲo]; born 4 May 1951) is a French actor, film director, screenwriter and film producer.

Jugnot was one of the founders of the comedy troupe Le Splendid in the 1970s, along with, among others, his high-school friends Christian Clavier, Thierry Lhermitte, and Michel Blanc. Then Josiane Balasko and Marie-Anne Chazel joined them. The group adapted a number of its stage hits for the cinema and was extremely successful in films such as Les Bronzés (1978), Les Bronzés font du ski (1979) and Le Père Noël est une ordure (1982).

Jugnot gained international fame for his lead role in Les Choristes in which he played Clément Mathieu. The last movie he directed was C'est beau la vie quand on y pense (2017).

Jugnot is the father of actor Arthur Jugnot, born in 1980 to Jugnot and wardrobe designer Cécile Magnan.

He was made Chevalier (Knight) of the Légion d'honneur in 2004.

== Life and career ==
Jugnot met Christian Clavier, Thierry Lhermitte, and Michel Blanc when attending the Lycee Pasteur de Neuilly-Sur-Seine. Together, and with other actors including Josiane Balasko and Marie-Anne Chazel, they founded the café-théâtre Le Splendid, which would also become the name of their troupe and, later on, an informal name for them as a collective on screen. He made his debut on the big-screen in Les Valseuses (1974) and Le Juge et l'Assassin (1976).

Jugnot's career kick-started when he starred with other troupe members in Les Bronzés (1978), and Le Père Noël est une ordure (1982), which were two acts from Le Splendid adapted for cinema.

Aside from acting, Jugnot also started a career as a movie director, making his directing debut in 1984 with the movie Pinot simple flic.

He also regularly took part in the radio show Les Grosses Têtes during the 1980s with Léon Zitrone, Olivier de Kersauson, Jacques Martin, and Jean Dutourd.

In 2010, he participated in Rendez-vous en terre inconnue.

== Filmography ==
=== Actor ===
Year	Title	Role	Notes
1973	The Year 01	Spectator	
1973	Hail the Artist	Camera Operator	
1974	Going Places	Holyday-Maker with Family	
1974	Les Suspects	Vauquier's Colleague	
1974	Bonne présentation exigée	Waiter	Short
1975	Le Bol d'air	Gérard	
1975	Let Joy Reign Supreme	Footman	
1975	C'est pas parce qu'on a rien à dire qu'il faut fermer sa gueule	Gaston	
1975	Pas de problème !	Locksmith	
1975	Vous ne l'emporterez pas au paradis	Waiter	
1976	Calmos	Follower	
1976	The Porter from Maxim's	Count Parieur	
1976	Dracula and Son	Head of the factory	
1976	The Toy	Pignier	
1976	The Judge and the Assassin	Photographer	
1976	The Tenant	Office Clerk	
1976	Monsieur Klein	Photographer	
1976	On aura tout vu	Ploumenech	
1976	Oublie-moi, Mandoline	Julien	
1977	Casanova and co	Valente	
1977	Herbie Goes to Monte Carlo	Waiter	
1977	Spoiled Children	Marcel Bonfils	
1977	The Seventh Company Outdoors	Gaston Gorgeton	
1977	Vous n'aurez pas l'Alsace et la Lorraine	Captain of the Musketeers	
1978	French Fried Vacation	Bernard Morin	
1978	Pauline et l'ordinateur	Fake Doctor	
1978	The Little Wheedlers		
1978	Si vous n'aimez pas ça, n'en dégoûtez pas les autres	Himself	
1978	Le Petit Théâtre d'Antenne 2		TV series (1 episode)
1979	Le Coup de sirocco	Ruppert	
1979	French Fried Vacation 2	Bernard Morin	
1979	Heroes Are Not Wet Behind the Ears	Pierre Morel	
1979	Un si joli village	Freval	
1979	Pierrot mon ami	Petit-Pouce	TV movie
1980	Retour en force	La Colle	
1980	Les Charlots contre Dracula	Gaston Lepope	
1980	The Umbrella Coup	Frédo	
1981	Pourquoi pas nous ?	Guillaume	
1982	Santa Claus Is a Stinker	Felix	
1982	Pour cent briques, t'as plus rien...	Paul	
1982	Le quart d'heure américain	Ferdinand	
1982	Merci Bernard		TV series (2 episodes)
1982	L'adieu aux as	Gaston Poirier	TV mini-series
1983	The Bride Who Came In from the Cold	Maurice	
1983	Gramps Is in the Resistance	Adolfo Ramirez	
1984	Just the Way You Are	Desk Clerk	
1984	Pinot simple flic	Robert Pinot	
1984	Le garde du corps	Paul Domec	
1985	Les rois du gag	Paul Martin	
1985	Scout toujours...	Jean-Baptiste Foucret	
1985	Slices of Life	Malounian	
1985	Santa Claus Is a Stinker	Félix	TV movie
1986	Nuit d'ivresse	Himself	
1987	Le Beauf	Gilbert	
1987	Tandem	Bernard Rivetot	Nominated – César Award for Best Actor
1987	Tant qu'il y aura des femmes	Spectator	
1988	Without Fear or Blame	Bellabre	
1988	Vertigo	Philippe Breugnot	TV series (1 episode)
1989	Les cigognes n'en font qu'à leur tête	Genealogist	
1990	1001 Nights	Jimmy Genious	
1991	Les Clés du paradis	Paul Cavaillac	
1991	The Professional Secrets of Dr. Apfelgluck	Martini	
1991	Une époque formidable...	Michel Berthier	Nominated – César Award for Best Actor
1992	Voyage à Rome	Thierry	
1994	Casque bleu	Patrick	
1994	Les Faussaires	Sacha Cohn	
1994	Dead Tired	Himself	
1996	Fallait pas !...	Bernard Leroy	
1996	Fantôme avec chauffeur	Georges Morel	
1997	Marthe	Henri	Nominated – César Award for Best Supporting Actor
1999	L'Ami du jardin	Roger	
1999	Au bain... Mari !	Narcisse	Short
1999	Trafic d'influence	Gérard Ravanelli	
2000	Most Promising Young Actress	Yvon Rance	
2001	Yes, But...	Erwann Moenner	
2002	Monsieur Batignole	Edmond Batignole	
2002	The Race	Carlito	
2002	Restauratec	Cook	TV short
2003	The Car Keys	Himself	
2003	Volpone	Grappione	TV movie
2004	The Chorus	Clément Mathieu	Nominated – César Award for Best Actor; Nominated – European Film Award for Best Actor
2004	Trois Petites Filles	Paolo	
2005	Boudu	Christian Lespinglet	
2005	Il ne faut jurer de rien !	Van Buck	
2005	Pollux, le manège enchanté	Sam	
2006	Les Bronzés 3 - Amis pour la vie	Bernard Morin	
2006	The Tiger Brigades	Claude Faivre	
2006	Un printemps à Paris	Alex	
2007	L'Île aux trésors	John Silver	
2007	Ali Baba and the Forty Thieves	Ali Baba	
2007	L'Auberge rouge	Father Carnus	
2008	Ça se soigne ?	Stan	
2008	Faubourg 36	Pigoil	
2008	The Sicilian Girl	Judge	
2008	Musée haut, musée bas	Roland Province	
2009	Envoyés très spéciaux	Albert Poussin	
2009	Le Petit Nicolas	Himself	
2009	Rose et Noir	Pic Saint Loup	
2010	Le grand restaurant	Fifi	TV movie
2011	La nouvelle guerre des boutons	Aztec's Father	
2011	Beur sur la ville	Gassier	
2012	Asterix and Obelix: God Save Britannia	Redbeard	
2012	Un jour mon père viendra	Gustave	
2012	Mes héros	Jacques	
2012	Merlin	Merlin	TV mini-series
2013	Adieu Paris	Albert Albert	
2014	Babysitting	M. Schaudel	
2014	On a marché sur Bangkok	Joseph	
2014	Benoît Brisefer: Les taxis rouges	Jules Dussiflard	
2015	Entre amis	Gilles	
2015-16	The law of Alexandre	Alexandre Laurent	TV series (3 Episodes)
2016	Camping 3	Charmillard	
2017	C'est beau la vie quand on y pense	Loïc Le Tallec	
2018	Nicky Larson et le Parfum de Cupidon	Psychiatrist	
2018	The Extraordinary Journey of the Fakir	Gustave Palourde	
2019	Quand on crie au loup	Joseph Bogomil	
2020	Ducobu 3	Kitrish	
2021	Spoiled Brats	Francis Bartek	
2021	Le petit piaf	M. Lepetit	
2022	Jemaux mais pas trop	Patrice Beaulieu	
2022	Ducobu Président !	Kitrish	
2023	Alibi.com 2	Daniel	
2023	Comme par Magie	Jacques	
2024	Ducobu passe au vert!	Kitrish	
2024	Neuilly-Poissy	Simon	

=== Director ===
Year	Title	Role	Box office	Notes
1984	Pinot simple flic	Director & writer	$18.1 million	
1985	Scout toujours...	Director & writer	$13.2 million	
1988	Without Fear or Blame	Director & writer	$3.1 million	
1991	Une époque formidable...	Director & writer	$12.5 million	
1993	The King of Ads	Director		Documentary
1994	3000 scénarios contre un virus	Director		TV series (1 episode)
1994	Casque bleu	Director & writer	$7.6 million	
1996	Fallait pas !...	Director & writer	$6.6 million	
2000	Most Promising Young Actress	Director & writer	$14.4 million	
2002	Monsieur Batignole	Director, writer & producer	$9 million	
2005	Boudu	Director & Producer	$9 million	
2009	Rose et noir	Director, writer & producer	$1.9 million	
2017	C'est beau la vie quand on y pense	Director, writer & producer		

=== Box office ===
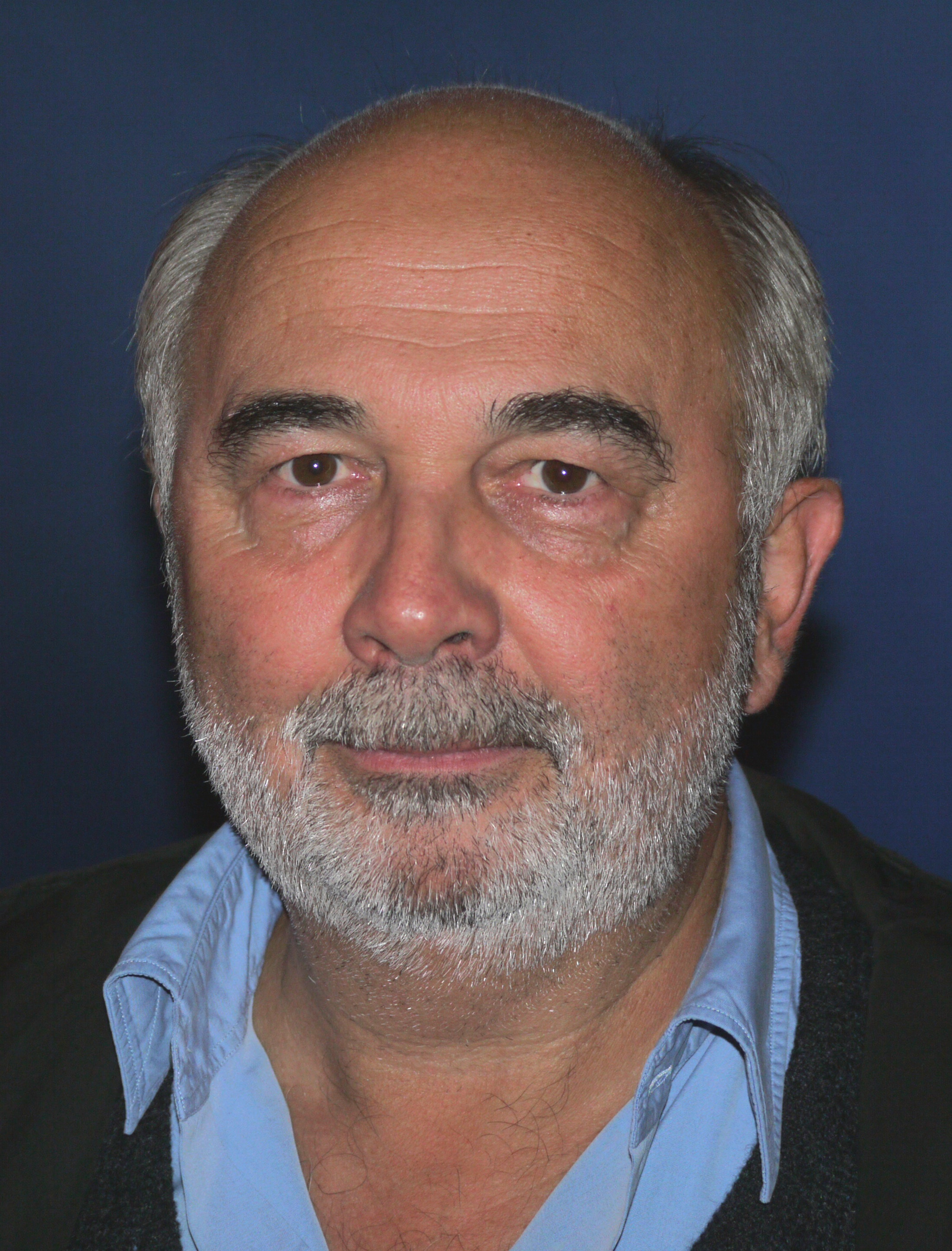
Gérard Jugnot in 2009

Movies starring Gérard Jugnot with more than a million entries in France.

	Films	Director	Year	France (entries)
1	Les Bronzés 3: Amis pour la vie	Patrice Leconte	2006	10,355,930
2	The Chorus	Christophe Barratier	2004	8,636,016
3	Going Places	Bertrand Blier	1974	5,726,031
4	Little Nicholas	Laurent Tirard	2009	5,520,562
5	Papy fait de la résistance	Jean-Marie Poiré	1983	4,104,082
6	Asterix and Obelix: God Save Britannia	Laurent Tirard (2)	2012	3,820,404
7	Herbie Goes to Monte Carlo	Vincent McEveety	1977	2,977,303
8	The Umbrella Coup	Gérard Oury	1980	2,451,606
9	Pinot simple flic	Gérard Jugnot	1984	2,418,756
10	Babysitting	Nicolas Benamou, Philippe Lacheau	2014	2,358,733
11	Les Bronzés	Patrice Leconte (2)	1978	2,308,644
12	Grosse Fatigue	Michel Blanc	1994	2,015,230
13	Pas de problème!	Georges Lautner	1975	1,810,393
14	La 7ème compagnie au clair de lune	Robert Lamoureux	1977	1,792,134
15	Monsieur Batignole	Gérard Jugnot (2)	2002	1,773,472
16	Scout toujours...	Gérard Jugnot (3)	1985	1,755,081
17	Une époque formidable...	Gérard Jugnot (4)	1991	1,672,754
18	Le Père Noël est une ordure	Jean-Marie Poiré (2)	1982	1,582,732
19	La nouvelle guerre des boutons	Christophe Barratier (2)	2011	1,542,231
20	Les Bronzés font du ski	Patrice Leconte (3)	1979	1,535,781
21	Les rois du gag	Claude Zidi	1985	1,510,930
22	The Race	Djamel Bensalah	2002	1,456,267
23	Le coup de sirocco	Alexandre Arcady	1979	1,387,034
24	Nuit d'ivresse	Bernard Nauer	1986	1,381,464
25	Le quart d'heure américain	Philippe Galland	1982	1,337,893
26	Paris 36	Christophe Barratier (3)	2008	1,331,585
27	Pour cent briques, t'as plus rien...	Édouard Molinaro	1982	1,303,784
28	On aura tout vu	Georges Lautner (2)	1976	1,290,565
29	The Toy	Francis Veber	1976	1,249,452
30	Boudu	Gérard Jugnot (5)	2005	1,199,369
31	Most Promising Young Actress	Gérard Jugnot (6)	2000	1,184,971
32	Casque bleu	Gérard Jugnot (7)	1994	1,015,156
