= Cité du Cinéma =

Film studio

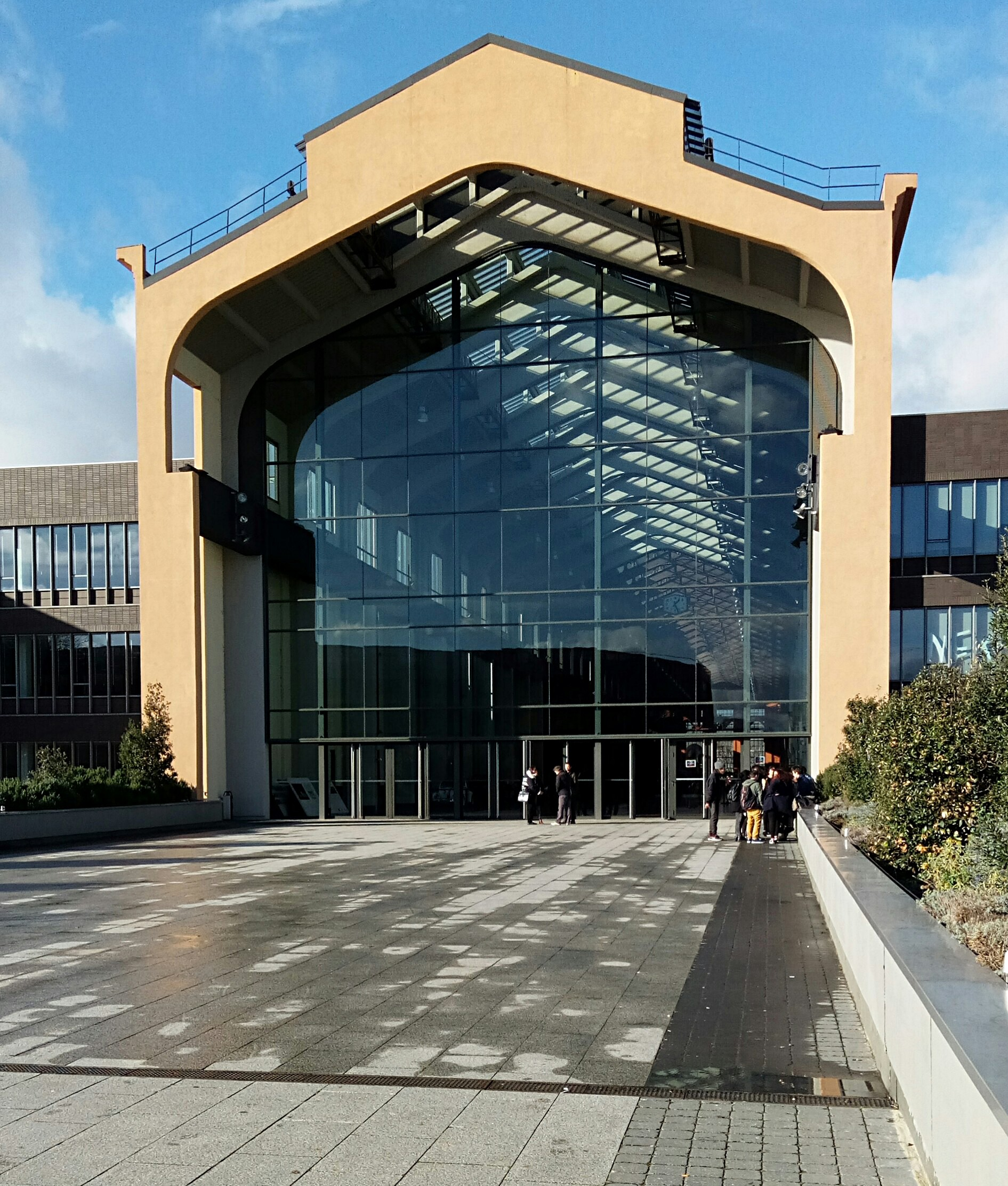
Main entrance

The Cité du Cinéma (French pronunciation: [site dy sinema]) or Studios of Paris is a film studio complex originally supported and founded by the film director and producer Luc Besson, located in Saint-Denis, in the northern suburbs of Paris, in a renovated power plant, commissioned in 1933 to power the Parisian metro. The studio complex is intended to be a competitor of Cinecittà in Rome, Pinewood in London and Babelsberg in Berlin. It was inaugurated on 21 September 2012. In February 2022 Tunisian-French film producer Tarak Ben Ammar finalized a deal to purchase Studios de Paris.

== History ==
The facility was originally designed in 2000 by Luc Besson. The project was officially launched in 2004, and required several months of technical specifications and financial structures. The project is now supported by major companies in the film and television production sector (film development, lighting, make-up etc.)

This should strengthen the role of cluster-image Plaine Commune with its fifty television studios (including the Plaine Saint-Denis), and 14 movie sets (in Epinay-sur-Seine, Aubervilliers, Stains and Saint-Ouen).

The Cité du Cinéma was originally set to open in May 2012 in accordance with the 2012 Cannes Film Festival. After some minor delays it did finally open its doors on Friday, September 21, 2012 in the presence of many international movie stars and public figures (Dianna Agron, Tarak Ben Ammar, Samuel Benchetrit, Luc Besson, Carole Bouquet, Clotilde Courau, Mireille Darc, Robert De Niro, Jamel Debbouze, Virginie Efira, Pascal Elbé, Mylène Farmer, Marina Foïs, Whoopi Goldberg, Salma Hayek, Jimmy Jean-Louis, Gérard Krawczyk, Christopher Lambert, Jack Lang, Mélanie Laurent, Virginie Ledoyen, Tommy Lee Jones, Gilles Lellouche, Benoît Magimel, Sophie Marceau, Kad Merad, Géraldine Nakache, Michelle Pfeiffer, Jean Reno, Jean-Paul Rouve, Ludivine Sagnier, Marie Sara, Éric Serra, Virginie Silla, Laura Smet, Melissa Theuriau, Jean Todt, Michelle Yeoh, Elsa Zylberstein). On the occasion of the inauguration, a short film on the construction of the complex was shown to the visiting guests.

In December 2013, the Parquet de Paris opened a preliminary investigation about the public financement of the Cité du cinéma.

In February 2022 it was announced that producer Tarak Ben Ammar had finalized his acquisition of the Studios of Paris, the deal is estimated in the $35-million range. Ben Ammar, who co-founded the Studios with Luc Besson a decade ago and owned a 25-percent stake in it, completed the acquisition via Eagle Pictures France, a subsidiary of the Italian production and distribution powerhouse. Ben Ammar took full ownership of the Studios from the former shareholders, including Besson, who owned a 9.9% stake in the complex through his holding company Frontline. The other shareholders who are set to exit the studios are EuropaCorp, Besson's former production banner which is now mainly owned by Vine Alternative and has a 40% stake in the property, as well as Euromedia, a broadcast facilities provider who has a 25% stake. Other bidders who circled the Studios include U.S. funds such as Oaktree Capital Management and TPG Real Estate.

The complex was used as part of the athlete's village during the 2024 Summer Olympics

== Events ==
In May 2013, the blogger Garance Doré made a report on the École de la Cité, founded by Luc Besson, whose holding Kering is a partner.

May 22, 2013, the Cité du Cinéma welcomes former United States President Bill Clinton for "30 years of the discovery of AIDS." For this event organized by UNITAID, more than 400 public officials were invited (Nikos Aliagas, Cécilia Attias, François Bayrou, Yamina Benguigui, Luc Besson, Carole Bouquet, Philippe Douste-Blazy, Nolwenn Leroy, Pierre Moscovici, Pascal Nègre, Dominique Ouattara, Christiane Taubira, Valérie Trierweiler) and were gathered in the nave for dinner.

October 3, 2013, the Cité du Cinéma hosted 130 attendants for the launch of its "movie nights", the first in a planned series of similar evenings with a specific theme. The theme of the inaugural event was Bollywood.

October 10, 2013, the VIP restaurant Le B.O. was inaugurated in the presence of many public figures (Luc Besson, Nader Boussandel, Emma Colberti, Vanessa Demouy, Dominique Farrugia, Xavier Giannoli, Philippe Gildas, Vahina Giocante, Tewfik Jallab, Scarlett Johansson, Hande Kodja, Henri Leconte, Philippe Lellouche, Mathias Malzieu, Caterina Murino, Virginie Silla, Alain Terzian, Ariel Zeitoun).

December 6, 2013, the FIA hosted its annual gala : The FIA Prize Giving 2013. 800 people attended in the presence of Luc Besson and Jean Todt, and many personalities from the world of motorsport : Sébastien Loeb, Alain Prost, Loïc Duval, Sebastian Vettel, Sébastien Ogier, Fernando Alonso, Mark Webber, Allan McNish, Tom Kristensen, Yvan Muller and Robert Kubica.

From February 15 – October 5, 2014, the Star Wars Identities exhibition could be found in two studio areas, roughly 2,000 m^{2} And included over 200 original pieces from the archives of the Lucas Arts Museum, including models, props, costumes, sketches that built the universe Star Wars of George Lucas.

Starting on April 4 – September 6, 2015, the Harry Potter exhibition takes place in parts of the studio area. Film sets, original costumes and creatures from the films based on J. K. Rowling novels will be on display.

Starting on April 13 – September 2, 2018, the Jurassic World exhibition takes place in parts of the studio area. Original creatures from the films based on Michael Crichton novels will be on display.

== Tenants ==
- Le B.O, VIP restaurant
- Blue Advertainment, advertising agency
- Cinématrans, transport company specialized in handling film equipments, theatrical wardrobe, location & studio logistics
- La Cité des Enfants, nursery
- Digital Factory, post-production studios
- L'École de la Cité, school of film directing and screenwriting
- Guard Corp, private security company
- The École nationale supérieure Louis-Lumière.
- Make Up For Ever TV & Cinema Academy, makeup school
- La N.E.F des acteurs, drama school
- Next Shot, audiovisual rental company
- The audiovisual production companies DGC, De l'Autre Côté du Périph, Derriere le futur, Irina Production and Pass Pass la Cam'.
- The production companies located are Ariel Zeitoun's Ajoz Films, Alain Chabat's Chez Wam, Luc Besson's EuropaCorp, Dominique Farrugia's FEW, Jamel Debbouze's Kissman Productions and Franck Carle's La Terre Tourne.
- Les Studios de Paris.

== Numbers ==
- An area of 62,000 m^{2} at the site of the Pleyel Crossroads :
  - 500 m^{2} for the makeup school Make Up For Ever : four training rooms and a pro shop dedicated to makeup.
  - 571 m^{2} for the mezzanine : 32 meters long, 17 meters wide. It can accommodate 500 people for cocktails and 380 people for a seated meal.
  - 1,129 m^{2} for the restaurant : 32 meters long, 25 meters wide and 17 meters high. Five different buffets. It can accommodate 1,500 people for cocktails and 650 people for a seated meal. A cafeteria, gym, florist, grocery store and a nursery with a capacity of 10 cribs.
  - 4,000 m^{2} for the offices : carpentry, painting workshop, the workshop model, the locksmith, the light shop, camera shop, machinery, office manufacturers, production offices, dressing rooms actors, 12 VIP boxes with a terrace, more spacious, are upstairs. In front of the boxes : dressing – makeup – hairdressing, sewing costumes and more inside the building, storage spaces.
  - 4,280 m^{2} for the central nave : 214 meters long, 20 meters wide and 18 meters high. It can accommodate 2,500 people.
  - 8,000 m^{2} for École nationale supérieure Louis-Lumière.
  - 9,350 m^{2} for 9 studios : 613 m^{2} for studio 8, 776 m^{2} for studios 1 and 2, 792 m^{2} for studio 7, 998 m^{2} for studio 6, 1,045 m^{2} for studios 3 and 4, 1,243 m^{2} for studio 9 and 2,068 m^{2} for studio 5 on 16 meters height. 5 pools of 150 m^{2} for studios 2, 3, 7 and 9 and 420 m^{2} for studio 5 a depth of 3 meters. The floors are wood studios 1, 2, 3, 7, and 8 and polished concrete for apartments 4, 5, 6 and 9. All trays are equipped with a technical grid extended over the entire surface of the plate and heating and air conditioning (two plants redistribute icy cold or hot air on all trays). They can accommodate up to 1,500 people for all kinds of events : convention, dance, workshop.
  - 19,000 m^{2} for the headquarters of EuropaCorp.
- The parking: 40 parking spaces during the day and 150 in the evening.
- The auditorium : 500 seats for professionals. The stage is 18 meters long and 7 meters high.
- A cost of 140 million euros : 130 million by the Caisse des dépôts et consignations and 10 million by Vinci.
- Architect office : Reichen and Robert.

== Shooting ==
=== Feature Film ===
- 2012 : Taken 2 by Olivier Megaton.
- 2013 : It Boy (20 ans d'écart) by David Moreau.
- 2013 : The Family (Malavita) by Luc Besson.
- 2014 : Le Jeu de la vérité by François Desagnat.
- 2014 : Mea Culpa by Fred Cavayé.
- 2014 : 3 Days to Kill by McG.
- 2014 : Life of Riley (Aimer, boire et chanter) by Alain Resnais.
- 2014 : Lucy by Luc Besson.
- 2014 : The Hundred-Foot Journey by Lasse Hallström.
- 2014 : The New Girlfriend (Une nouvelle amie) by François Ozon.
- 2015 : Taken 3 by Olivier Megaton.
- 2015 : Entre amis by Olivier Baroux.
- 2015 : The Transporter Refueled (Le Transporteur : Héritage) by Camille Delamarre.
- 2015 : Lolo by Julie Delpy.
- 2016 : Jackie by Pablo Larraín.
- 2017 : Sous le même toit by Dominique Farrugia.
- 2017 : Valerian and the City of a Thousand Planets (Valérian et la Cité des mille planètes) by Luc Besson.
- 2017 : Santa & Cie by Alain Chabat.
- 2018 : La Ch'tite famille by Dany Boon.
- 2018 : Taxi 5 by Franck Gastambide.
- 2018 : Robin Hood by Otto Bathurst.
- 2019 : Anna by Luc Besson.
- 2019 : Notre-Dame brûle by Jean-Jacques Annaud.
- 2022 : Murder Mystery 2 by Jeremy Garelick

=== Television ===
- 2012–2013 : Le Monde d'après.
- 2013–2014 : Complément d'enquête.
- 2013 : Y'a pas d'âge.
- 2014 : Rising Star.
- 2015–2016 : The Bureau (Le Bureau des légendes).
- 2015–2016 : La Petite Histoire de France.
- 2015–2016 : Bloqués.
- 2016–2017 : C politique.
- 2016–2017 : En famille.
- 2016–2018 : Scènes de ménages.
- 2020– : Emily in Paris.

=== Short film ===
- 2013 : Once Upon a Time... by Karl Lagerfeld.
- 2013 : Twaaga by Cédric Ido.
- 2015 : Once and Forever by Karl Lagerfeld.
- 2016 : Silhouette by Bertrand Cazor.
- 2016 : Deux Infinités Circulaires by Matthias Eyer.
- 2017 : The Faun of Healwood (Dans les Bois : l'Orée) by Stéphane Artus.

=== Advertisements ===
- 2013 : Givenchy by Cédric Klapisch. (advertising for the 10th anniversary of perfume Very Irresistible with Amanda Seyfried).
- 2014 : Coco Mademoiselle by Joe Wright. (advertising with Keira Knightley and Danila Kozlovsky).

=== Music video ===
- 2012 : Doom and Gloom by Jonas Åkerlund.
- 2015 : Voir la nuit s'emballer.

== Access ==
- By car : A86 motorway, exit 08a Saint-Denis Pleyel.
- By public transport :
  - By bus : Bus 139 and Bus 274, station Rue Ampère.
  - By Paris Métro : line 13, station Carrefour Pleyel, exit Cap Ampère.
  - By RER : RER D, station Stade de France – Saint-Denis.
- Close to:
  - The Boulevard Périphérique : 5 min.
  - The Charles de Gaulle Airport : 15 min.
