= Géraldine Nakache =

French actress and director

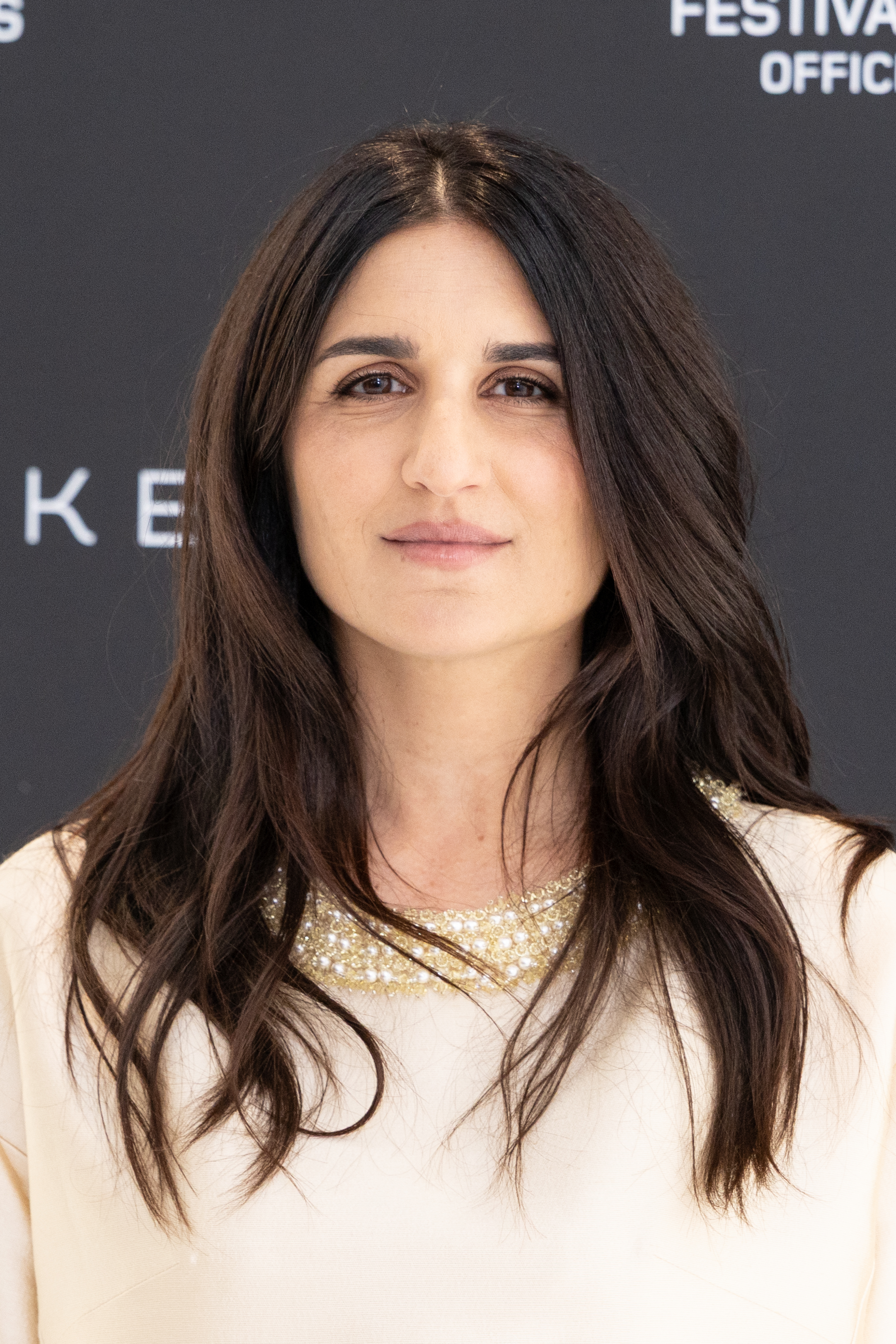
- Nakache in 2026
- Born: 16 February 1980 (age 46); Puteaux, France
- Occupations: Actress, film director, screenwriter
- Years active: 2000–present
- Spouse: Manu Payet (m. 2009; div. 2011)

Géraldine Nakache (born 16 February 1980) is a French actress, film director, and screenwriter.

== Life and career ==
Nakache grew up in an Algerian Jewish family. She earned a DEUG diploma in cinema. She worked as assistant casting director in Groland on Canal + and as assistant director for Les Guignols de l'info and eventually executive producer on Comédie+. She has also appeared in a string of films and television series and directed Tout ce qui brille (2010) for which she won a number of awards and Nous York (2012).

She was married to actor and comedian Manu Payet in 2009. They divorced in 2011. She is the sister of film director Olivier Nakache.

== Filmography ==
=== As actress ===
Film
Year	Title	Role	Notes
2003	Hey Good Looking!	Nina	
2008	Tu peux garder un secret ?	Fanny	
2009	Tellement proches	The religious	
2009	Jusqu'à toi	Josée	
2009	R.T.T.	Muriel Serkine	
2010	Tout ce qui brille	Ely	Nominated—Globes de Cristal Award for Best Actress
2010	Coursier	Nadia	
2010	Bacon on the Side	Sophie	
2011	The Day I Saw Your Heart	Cécilia	
2012	The Players	Stéphanie	
2012	Sur la piste du Marsupilami	Pétunia	
2012	Nous York	Gabrielle	
2013	Je fais le mort	Noémie Desfontaines	
2014	Asterix: The Land of the Gods	Dulcia	Voice
2014	Sous les jupes des filles	Ysis	
2014	L'Ex de ma vie	Ariane	
2014	Atlit	Cali	
2015	Robin des bois, la véritable histoire	Marianne	
2016	Et ta sœur ?	Tessa	
2018	Les Aventures de Spirou et Fantasio	Seccotine	
2019	J'irai où tu iras	Vali	
2021	Kaamelott: The First Chapter	Duchess of Aquitaine	

Television
Year	Title	Role	Notes	
2003	Bad People	Serena		
2003–2004	Starloose Academy	Nathalie		
2004–2005	La Téloose	Various		
2007	Kaamelott	Duchess of Aquitaine	TV series	
2007	Mariage surprise	Céline	Telefilm	
2009	Canal Presque	Various		
2009	Déformations professionnelles		TV series	
2012	Scènes de ménages	Barbara	TV series	
2012	Zak	Herself	TV series	
2013	Le Débarquement	Various		
2018, 2021	Hippocrate	Nathalie Ferrand	TV series, 15 episodes	
2020	La Flamme	Marina	Main cast; 9 episodes	
2024	Fiasco		TV series	
2025	Asterix and Obelix: The Big Fight	Impedimenta (voice)	Alain Chabat	TV miniseries

=== As filmmaker ===
Year	Title	Credited as		Notes
Year	Title	Director	Screenwriter	Notes
2007	Tout ce qui brille	Yes	Yes	Short film
2010	Tout ce qui brille	Yes	Yes	Nominated—César Award for Best First Feature Film; Nominated—Lumière Award for Best Screenplay
2012	Nous York	Yes	Yes	
2019	J'irai où tu iras	Yes	Yes	

== Theatre ==
- 2011: L’Amour, la mort, les fringues by Nora and Delia Ephron, directed by Danièle Thompson (Théâtre Marigny)

== Discography ==
=== Singles ===
Year	Single	Peak positions	Notes
Year	Single	FR	Notes
2010	"Chanson sur une drôle de vie" (Géraldine Nakache & Leïla Bekhti)	6	From soundtrack of film Tout ce qui brille. A remake of a Véronique Sanson hit.

== Awards and nominations ==
Tout ce qui brille co-directed by Géraldine Nakache and Hervé Mimran won a number of awards including Jury Awards and the Public Award at the Festival international du film de comédie de l'Alpe d'Huez. She also won the Gold Trophy for Best Female Revelation, all in 2010.

In 2011, she was awarded the Golden Star of French Cinema Award for her debut film Tout ce qui brille.
