= Asterix and Obelix: The Big Fight =

2025 French animated television miniseries

- French: Astérix et Obélix : Le Combat des chefs
- Genre: Animated comedy Action; Adventure
- Created by: Alain Chabat; Benoît Oullion; Pierre-Alain Bloch
- Based on: Asterix and the Big Fight by: René Goscinny; Albert Uderzo
- Directed by: Alain Chabat; Fabrice Joubert
- Voices of: Alain Chabat; Gilles Lellouche; Anaïs Demoustier; Laurent Lafitte; Thierry Lhermitte; Grégoire Ludig; Géraldine Nakache; Grégory Gadebois; Jean-Pascal Zadi; Fred Testot
- Composer: Mathieu Alvado
- Country of origin: France
- Original language: French
- No. of episodes: 5

Production
- Producer: Alain Goldman
- Running time: 32–43 minutes
- Production companies: Les Éditions Albert René; Légende Films; TAT Productions; Netflix Animation Studios

Original release
- Network: Netflix
- Release: April 30, 2025

Asterix and Obelix: The Big Fight (French: Astérix et Obélix : Le Combat des chefs) is a French 3D animated miniseries based on the Asterix franchise and consisting of five episodes, created by Alain Chabat, Benoît Oullion, and Pierre-Alain Bloch, and directed by Chabat and Fabrice Joubert. It premiered on Netflix on April 30, 2025. The series adapts the comic album Asterix and the Big Fight (1966) by René Goscinny and Albert Uderzo. The plot follows the indomitable Gaulish village as they face a Roman-orchestrated "Big Fight" while their druid, Getafix, loses his sanity.

== Premise ==
In 50 BC, the Gaulish village that resists Roman occupation faces a crisis when Obelix accidentally hits druid Getafix with a menhir while seeking to save him from a Roman ambush. This causes the druid to lose his memory and sanity, leaving him unable to brew the magic potion that grants superhuman strength, only he knows the recipe of.

This comes at the worst possible moment, as the Romans have decided to invoke an ancient Gaulish custom, the "Big Fight", by pitting the village's chief Vitalstatistix against Cassius Ceramix, a pro-Roman Gaulish chief. If Vitalstatistix loses, Cassius Ceramix will become the village's chief, and place it under Roman control.

To ensure the village's independence, Asterix and Obelix must foil the Roman plot and restore Getafix’s sanity.

== Voice cast ==
=== Original French-language version ===
==== Main cast ====
- Alain Chabat as Asterix, Geriatrix and Twinpix, the Big fight's referee
- Gilles Lellouche as Obelix
- Anaïs Demoustier as Metadata
- Laurent Lafitte as Julius Caesar
- Thierry Lhermitte as Getafix
- Grégoire Ludig as Vitalstatistix
- Géraldine Nakache as Impedimenta
- Grégory Gadebois as Cassius Ceramix
- Jean-Pascal Zadi as Potus
- Fred Testot as Fastanfurius and a germophobic Roman legionary

==== Recurring cast ====
- Jeanne Balibar as Apothika
- Jérôme Commandeur as Blackangus and Caesar's mother
- Stéfi Celma as Annabarbera
- Alexandre Astier as Unhygienix
- Pio Marmaï as Fulliautomatix and a construction chief
- David Marsais as Cacofonix
- Gérard Darmon as Copacetix, the village's previous chief
- Xavier Fagnon as the narrator

==== Guest voices ====
- Chantal Lauby as a Roman mother
- Tanino Liberatore as a caricaturist
- Jamel Debbouze as Gallo-Roman villager Sycophantix, and a chicken
- Fabrice Joubert as a fairground vendor

=== English-language version ===
- Haydn Oakley as Asterix
- Ben Crowe as Obelix
- Daisy May Cooper as Impedimenta
- Ruby Barker as Metadata
- Jeanne Balibar as Apothika
- Mark Meadows Williams as Julius Caesar
- Nick Mercer as Mummy Caesar
- Matt Wilkinson as Fastanfurius
- Jon Glover as Getafix
- John Wark as Vitalstatistix
- Keith Wickham as Potus
- Stewart Scydamore as Cassius Ceramix
- David Monteath as Blackangus
- Megan Gage as Hannabarbera
- Rob Rackstraw as Unhygienix
- Jonathan Keebl as Copacetix
- Martin Marquez as Geriatrix
- Jessica Carroll as Mrs Geriatrix
- Lizzie Waterworth as Young Obelix
- Claire Morgan as Nimbus

== Production ==
=== Development ===
In March 2021, Netflix, Les Éditions Albert René, and producer Alain Goldman announced a 3D animated series adapting Asterix and the Big Fight, with Alain Chabat as co-writer and director. Chabat, a lifelong Asterix fan and the director of the 2002 live action film Asterix & Obelix: Mission Cleopatra, which grossed 14 million admissions in France, aimed to create a faithful yet innovative adaptation. The series was developed at TAT Productions in Toulouse, employing over 60 animators, with Kristof Serrand (formerly of DreamWorks) as animation director.

While the series' main storyline is based on the original Asterix and the Big Fight comic, its first episode, which is set during Asterix and Obelix's childhood, is loosely adapted from the illustrated story How Obelix Fell into the Magic Potion When He Was a Little Boy. A minor plot element, when Vitalstatistix falls ill from overeating, is adapted from a similar scene in Asterix and the Chieftain's Shield. The concluding events of the series around the Big Fight itself are original to the adaptation, and several characters are changed from the original comic. The boorish Roman centurion Nebulus Nimbus and his scheming advisor Felonius Caucus are replaced with the thickheaded general Fastanfurius and his clever niece Metadata. In the comic, legionary Infirmofpurpus is sent to spy on the village: in the series, the character is renamed Potus and made a centurion, as well as given an expanded role as the camp's commander. Julius Caesar, who does not appear in the original comic story, is given a pivotal supporting role in the adaptation. Besides Metadata, the miniseries includes several important female characters while the original story had none. The male druid Psychoanalytix to whom Asterix and Obelix turn for help is now a female Goth druid, Apothika. The character of Julius Caesar's mother is also original to the series.

=== Animation and design ===
The series' 3D animation, led by art director Aurélien Prédal, emulates Albert Uderzo's art style from the late 1960s to early 1970s, specifically between Asterix at the Olympic Games and Asterix and the Laurel Wreath. Character designs by Alfonso Salazar were sculpted to ensure fidelity to the comics. The production involved storyboarding by Rodolphe Guenoden and others, with editing by David Boyadjian and Florent Colignon, and sound mixing by Marc Doisne. In Episode V, a short film inspired by Wile E. Coyote and the Road Runner, The Boars, was only produced from Xilam Animation rather than TAT Productions.

=== Music ===
The score, composed by Mathieu Alvado, blends comedic and adventurous tones, paying homage to the classic Asterix animated films while introducing modern elements.

== Episodes ==
All five episodes were released on Netflix on April 30, 2025.

No.	Title
1	"Episode I"
In 50 BC, the Gaulish village repels an attack from hapless Roman centurion Potus and his troops. A flashback to 78 BC shows Asterix and Obelix as children, already inseparable friends. At school, when called to give a presentation before the class, Obelix gets stage fright and can't speak, so Asterix speaks for him, but Obelix faints a moment later. The village hosts Cassius Ceramix, the son of a neighbouring chief, for a few days. An obnoxious bully, Cassius pressures Asterix and Obelix into stealing Getafix's golden sickle. As they try to do so, Obelix falls into a potion cauldron, which grants him permanent super strength. It was Obelix's blunder that allowed Getafix to achieve the magic potion he had been trying to create, the decisive ingredient being the four-leaf clover that was in Obelix's pocket.
2	"Episode II"
Back to 50 BC, Caesar seeks to conquer the last rebellious Gaulish village. Metadata, a young female archivist working at Caesar's palace, suggests to have Vitalstatistix challenged by a pro-Roman chief in a ritual Gaulish "Big Fight" in order to subjugate the village. Impressed by Metadata's cleverness, Caesar sends her and her uncle, obtuse general Fastanfurius, to organize the challenge. At Metadata's suggestion, Fastanfurius sends Potus and his men to kidnap Getafix so Vitalstatistix will not benefit from the druid's magic potion. As Asterix and Obelix try to rescue Getafix, Obelix accidentally hits him with a menhir. Cassius Ceramix, now a brutish and despotic Gallo-Roman village chief, is selected by the Romans as their champion. He first balks at the idea of fighting Vitalstatistix but, upon hearing that Getafix is dead, agrees to the challenge. At the village, Getafix is revived but Obelix's menhir blow has rendered him amnesiac and insane.
3	"Episode III"
Cassius Ceramix visits Vitalstatistix to formally challenge him, but discovers to his horror that Getafix is still alive. Asterix, Obelix and Vitalstatistix try to get Getafix to prepare the magic potion but the insane druid only manages to brew unstable, explosive potions. Fastanfurius sends Potus to the village on a spying mission. Asterix and Obelix capture Potus and decide to use him as a guinea pig by making him drink Getafix's failed potions. Potus experiences various bizarre effects until one potion makes him float away from the village, allowing him to inform Fastanfurius and Cassius Ceramix that Getafix is now unable to make the magic potion. Asterix and Obelix seek help from Goth therapist Apothika to restore Getafix's sanity. However, Obelix accidentally hits Apothika with a menhir, rendering her insane like Getafix.
4	"Episode IV"
The "Big Fight" arena is completed. Caesar and Cleopatra attend the chaotic tournament, together with Caesar's overbearing mother. Vitalstatistix names Obelix as interim chief so he can fight in his place. Asterix argues with Vitalstatistix that Obelix is not cut out to be a chief; after Obelix overhears this, he gets into a dispute with Asterix and ends up banishing him from the village. As the fight is about to start Cassius Ceramix is terrified to discover that his opponent will be Obelix. However, when Obelix is called upon to give a pre-fight speech he once again gets stage fright, without Asterix being present to help him: he faints on the canvas, and Cassius Ceramix is declared the winner.
5	"Episode V"
Left as the last indomitable Gaul, Asterix challenges Caesar, who orders an attack on the village. A brawl ensues, during which Cassius Ceramix unwittingly restores Getafix's sanity with a shield blow. Dismayed by the cruelty of Roman colonization, Metadata defects and helps Getafix brew a cauldron of magic potion. Fastanfurius and Potus steal the potion for their troops to drink and defeat the Gauls, only to discover it was sabotaged by Getafix. The Roman troops float into the air and turn luminescent, leading Caesar's mother to interpret it as a show for her birthday. Happy that his usually jaded mother is impressed for once, Caesar grants a pardon to the village. Cassius Ceramix, who had been cowardly hiding during the battle, tries to reconcile with Vitalstatistix who sends him flying with a punch. Together with their new friend Metadata, the Gauls celebrate their victory with a banquet; Obelix overcomes his stage fright to give a speech about village solidarity.

== Release ==
A promotional campaign began with a teaser on December 16, 2024, and a trailer on March 5, 2025. A creative marketing video on June 11, 2024, parodied Netflix titles like Breaking Barde and The Crown de Laurier. The series premiered on Netflix on April 30, 2025, with all episodes released simultaneously in multiple languages including French, English, German, Dutch, Flemish, Italian and Polish.

== Reception ==
Asterix and Obelix: The Big Fight received generally positive reviews, particularly for its vibrant 3D animation, faithful adaptation of the 1966 comic, and sharp humor. On AlloCiné, the series earned a 4.3 out of 5 rating based on French critic reviews, with praise for Alain Chabat's direction and the voice performances of Chabat and Gilles Lellouche. Fernanda Camargo of Common Sense Media calls it "a loyal adaptation" but warns that some of the references and satire might be misunderstood by younger viewers who aren't familiar with the historical context.

In the US, critics lauded the series as a "triumphant and impressive" adaptation, with Florian Etcheverry of "What's on Netflix" giving it a resounding endorsement for its emotional depth, anti-imperialistic themes, and appeal across generations. He noted the animation's "fluorescent tints" reminiscent of Spider-Man: Into the Spider-Verse and the strong ensemble cast, calling it a "big Gallic tent" that never feels like overkill. The Peach Review awarded the series a 9 out of 10, praising its monumental buildup, pop culture references, and fidelity to the comics' spirit, recommending it in French with subtitles for authenticity.

In the UK, the series was well-received for capturing the "playful satire" of the comics. Rohan Naahar of The Indian Express (writing for a global audience but published in English) gave it a 4 out of 5, calling it a "lovingly crafted homage" that smartly devotes its opening episode to Asterix and Obelix's childhood, likening it to "Harry Potter getting his scar". He highlighted its political satire of authoritarianism, though noted France's own colonial history adds complexity to the narrative.

Critics stated that while not flawless, the series successfully honored Goscinny and Uderzo's legacy, with its witty dialogue, modern pop-culture nods, and vibrant visuals making it a "family-friendly hit".

== Cultural references ==
The series is laden with puns, pop culture nods and humorous anachronisms, a hallmark of Goscinny's writing:

- Puns in characters' names, including Fastanfurius (Fast & Furious), Annabarbera (Hanna-Barbera), Twinpix (Twin Peaks), Beetlejus (Beetlejuice) and Mileycirus (Miley Cyrus).
- Episode I includes a Star Wars homage with a Roman transforming into R2-D2, Obelix falling in the magic potion kettle, imitating Gwen Stacy's fall from The Amazing Spider-Man 2 and Obelix arranging menhirs like Stonehenge.
- Episode II references Star Wars: The Last Jedi in a mosaic and Jamel Debbouze’s role from Asterix & Obelix: Mission Cleopatra.
- Episode III features Getafix mimicking the James Bond gun barrel sequence and sounds from Chabat's Burger Quiz. Apothika, a Goth druidess, sports a contemporary goth look.
- Episode IV includes Getafix and Apothika performing a Pulp Fiction dance, a Roman theme park with an It's a Small World inspired ride, and a Captain America-like shield game.
- Throughout episodes IV and V, two original characters, presenter Annabarbera and retired gladiator Blackangus, break down the events in the manner of television sports commentators.
- Episode V echoes Matrix Revolutions and Avengers: Endgame in its action sequences, with a post-credits scene styled like Road Runner and Wile E. Coyote.
