= Comédie+ =

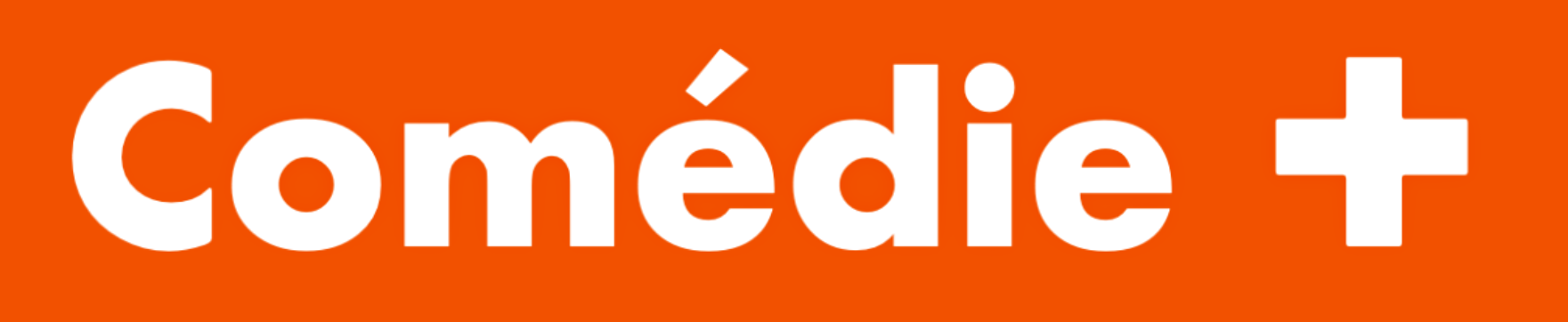
- Country: France
- Broadcast area: France; Belgium; Switzerland
- Headquarters: Issy-les-Moulineaux

Programming
- Language(s): French
- Picture format: 1080i (SDTV)

Ownership
- Owner: Canal+ Thématiques (Canal+)

History
- Launched: 29 November 1997
- Founder: Dominique Farrugia
- Former names: Comédie! (1997-2011)

Links
- Website: canalplus.com/chaines/comedie

Comédie+ (formerly Comédie!) is a French pay television channel dedicated to humour since 1997. It is directed by Dominique Farrugia, a former member of the Les Nuls comedy team.

== History ==
Comédie! began its broadcasts on 29 November 1997 on Canal Satellite and then on cable. The channel is dedicated to the actor and comedian Bruno Carette from the troupe Les Nuls, who died in 1989. The channel had a daily show named La Grosse Émission which helped popularize the comedians troupe Les Robins des Bois (The Robinhoods) and famous personalities such as Cyril Hanouna, Kad Merad and Olivier Baroux. The show ran until June 2002 and had a revival in 2015-2016, and a prime-time show La Très Grosse Emission on Canal+ in 2016.

In 2003, the channel was bought by Pathé, which reformatted it to make it a mini-generalist of laughter and humor. As of September 20, 2003, its programs began at 8 a.m. Monday through Sunday. Following its withdrawal from television, Pathé sold the channel at the end of 2004 to multiThématiques, a subsidiary of Groupe Canal+.

The channel had been selected in 2005 to be among the pay-TV digital terrestrial television (TNT) channels shared with Cuisine TV, but its authorization was canceled shortly afterwards.

On 1 July 2015, Canalsat made a full transition to MPEG-4 and HD, Comédie+ switched to HD at this date.

On 1 July 2016, Comédie+, Infosport+, Planète+ and Planète+ A&E were removed of Numericable, because they lost their exclusivity exemption because of the launch of SFR fiber offers with Numericable TV bouquets. Since 19 March 2019, all Canal bouquets are available on SFR TV cable and fiber platform.

In August 2018, Canal+ launched a premium channel dedicated to humor for the African market (on channel 5 of Canal+ Afrique), which was replaced by Canal+ Pop on 30 September 2021.
