= Bruno Carette =

French humorist and comedian (1956–1989)

- Born: 26 November 1956; Algiers, French Algeria
- Died: 8 December 1989 (aged 33); Paris, France
- Occupation(s): Humorist, comedian

Bruno Carette (26 November 1956 – 8 December 1989) was a French humorist and comedian. He was a member and founder of the group of comedians Les Nuls alongside Alain Chabat, Chantal Lauby and Dominique Farrugia.

== Filmography ==
- 1987: Cinematon directed by Gérard Courant: Himself (Segment: 979)
- 1988 : Sans peur et sans reproche directed by Gérard Jugnot : Grégoire
- 1990 : May Fools directed by Louis Malle: Grimaldi
- 1994 : La cité de la peur directed by Alain Berbérian: Misou-Mizou (archive footage)
