= Burger Quiz =

- Genre: Humorous game show
- Created by: Alain Chabat; Kader Aoun
- Written by: Alain Chabat; Kader Aoun; Benoît Oullion; Dan Andreï; Ambre Larrazet; Cyril Cohen; Max Chabat
- Directed by: Jérôme Revon; Jean-Jacques Amsellem; Frédéric Talfumière
- Presented by: Alain Chabat; Kad and Olivier; Laurent Baffie; Alexandre Devoise; Gad Elmaleh; Dominique Farrugia; Maurice Barthélemy; Vincent Dedienne; Anne Depétrini; Marina Foïs; Mathieu Madénian; Manu Payet; Jérôme Commandeur; Gérard Darmon; Helena Noguerra; Jean-Paul Rouve; Alison Wheeler; Laurent Lafitte
- Narrated by: Bruno Salomone
- Theme music composer: Williams Guitton
- Country of origin: France
- Original language: French
- No. of seasons: 4

Production
- Producers: Chez Wam; R&G productions

Original release
- Release: 27 August 2001 – 5 July 2002

Burger Quiz is a French humorous game show created by Alain Chabat and Kader Aoun, first broadcast on Canal + from 27 August 2001 to 5 July 2002, before being replayed on Comédie! Channel from 2006.

A new version of the show has started on 25 April 2018, on the French channel TMC.

On 26 April 2018, it has officially become the most watched entertainment show in the history of French digital TV with 2.3 million of viewers.

The first version of the show was first produced by Chez Wam, the production company of Alain Chabat, then by R&G productions. Almost always hosted by Alain Chabat the show also involved several other French personalities as host (Kad and Olivier, Marina Foïs, Gerard Darmon...).

The TV show also involved a voice over, made by French comedian Bruno Salomone since the beginning.

The concept of the TV show is based on a series of more or less serious questions. Two teams, the ketchup and the mayo (mayonnaise), fight to reach 25 points first. Both teams are composed of two celebrities and one anonymous candidate. The winning team can access to the final test "Le burger de la mort" (the death burger) which consists of ten questions asked one after the other to the candidate which then need to answer them in the right order.

== Background ==
Created in 2001 by Alain Chabat and Kader Aoun, the TV show had for mission to replace one of the biggest success of Canal + at that time, another French TV show called “Nulle part ailleurs”. Popular during its first season that aired between 27 August 2001 to 5 July 2002, the show was a reference in what was called in France “l’esprit Canal”, in reference to the new concepts and the new form of humour that the French Channel Canal + created. Even though the show was a success, the original show only got one season.

From 2006, another French TV channel, Comédie +, decided to broadcast on replay every episode from that first season, contributing to the success of the show.

In 2018, Alain Chabat has decided to do a reboot of the show. After several refusals, notably by Canal+, the first episode of the second season was broadcast on April 25, on the French channel TMC which belongs to the TF1 group.

The two versions of the show have the same director, Jérôme Revon, who also owns R&G production, the new production company for the TV show.

The show has now 4 seasons and is still on air.

== Concept ==
The concept of the TV show is based on a quiz with questions on broad topics.

The show's universe takes place in a burger restaurant (hence the name) which is managed by the presenter.

Two teams fight each other, the ketchup and the mayonnaise, and are composed of two celebrities and one anonymous candidate. The goal is to first reach 25 points (called “miam”) which allow the candidate of the winning team to try the “death burger” (le burger de la mort). The goal is to win €1000 .

The 25 points can be win through four different rounds:

1. Nuggets (Nuggets)
2. Salt or Pepper (Sel ou poivre)
3. The Menu (Menus)
4. The Bill (L’addition)

The final round is "The Death Burger" (Le burger de la mort) which consists of ten questions asked by the host one after the other to the candidate which then need to answer them in the right order without forgetting one.

In the 2018's version, the show is interspersed with humorous sketches featuring French actors.

== Writers ==
With the departure of one of its creators, Kader Aoun, the new version of Burger Quiz has new writers.

The new team consists of Benoît Oullion, Dan Andreï, Ambre Larrazet, Cyril Cohen, and Max Chabat, Alain Chabat's son

The voice-over has from the beginning been provided by French comedian Bruno Salomone.

== Merchandising ==
Burger Quiz has launched in October 2018 its own board game at Dujardin edition.
