= Chantal Lauby =

French actress, comedian, film director and screenwriter

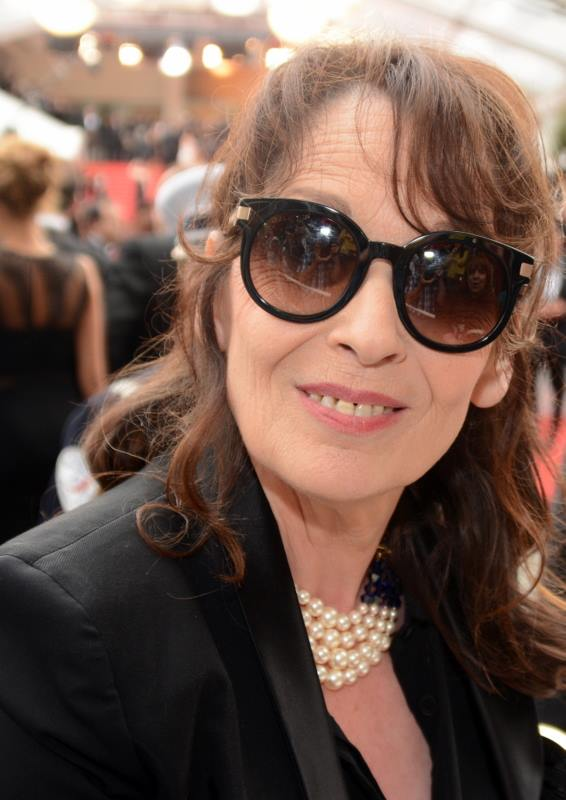
- Chantal Lauby at the 2014 Cannes Film Festival
- Born: 23 March 1948 (age 78); Gap, Hautes-Alpes, France
- Occupations: Actress, film director, screenwriter, humorist comedian, television host
- Years active: 1979–present

Chantal Lauby (French: [ʃɑ̃tal lobi]; born 23 March 1948) is a French actress, film director, screenwriter, humorist, comedian and television host. She is a member and founder of the comedy troupe Les Nuls alongside Bruno Carette, Alain Chabat and Dominique Farrugia.

== Career ==
Born in Gap, Chantal Lauby spent her childhood in Auvergne, between Auzon and Clermont-Ferrand. She begins to television as an announcer on FR3 Auvergne. Her career on regional offices of France 3 and Radio France where she meets Bruno Carette.

== Personal life ==
She is the mother of Jennifer Ayache (born 1983), singer of the French rock band Superbus. In one of her films, the album Aéromusical was the official soundtrack of the movie.

== Theatre ==
Year	Title	Author	Director	Notes
1990	Vite une femme	Daniel Prévost	Jean-Luc Moreau	Théâtre Michel
1997	La Terrasse	Jean-Claude Carrière	Bernard Murat	Théâtre Antoine-Simone Berriau

== Filmography ==
Year	Title	Role	Director	Notes
1979	Ils sont grands, ces petits	Madame Bellon	Joël Santoni	
1987	Objectif: Nul	Panty	Myriam Isker, Mathias Ledoux, ...	TV series Writer (with Les Nuls); 7 d'Or for Best Comedy Show
1989	Palace	Léonie	Jean-Michel Ribes	TV series
1990	Histoire(s) de la télévision	Eve-Marie Gilet	Alain Berbérian & Alexis Bouriquet	TV series
1994	La Cité de la peur	Odile Deray	Alain Berbérian (2)	Writer (with Les Nuls)
1995	Arthur	The woman	Félicie Dutertre & François Rabes	Short
1996	XY, drôle de conception	Denise	Jean-Paul Lilienfeld	
1996	Delphine 1, Yvan 0	Madame Hattus	Dominique Farrugia	
1996	Le secret de Julia	Julia	Philomène Esposito	TV movie
1997	Didier	Solange	Alain Chabat	
1997	Maintenant ou jamais	Yolande	Jérôme Foulon	TV movie
1998	Telle mère, telle fille	Elisabeth Gestin	Élisabeth Rappeneau	TV movie
1999	Evamag	Louise	Agnès Boury, Christian François, ...	TV series (15 episodes)
2000	Most Promising Young Actress	Françoise	Gérard Jugnot	
2000	Antilles sur Seine	Herman	Pascal Légitimus	
2000	Kitchendales	Narrator	Chantal Lauby	
2000	En solitaire	The Mother	Stéphane Kazandjian	Short
2001	La cape et l'épée	Cantal Lauby	Jean-Jacques Amsellem	TV series (1 episode)
2002	Asterix & Obelix: Mission Cleopatra	Cartapus	Alain Chabat (2)	
2002	La panne	The Woman	Frédéric Cerulli	
2003	Laisse tes mains sur mes hanches	Odile Rousselet	Chantal Lauby (2)	
2003	The Car Keys	The clings's woman	Laurent Baffie	
2004	Casablanca Driver	Cathy	Maurice Barthélemy	
2004	Caméra café	Emma	Francis Duquet	TV series (1 episode)
2006	Toi et moi	Éléonore	Julie Lopes-Curval	
2006	Mr. Average	Françoise	Pierre-Paul Renders	
2008	Vilaine	Mélanie's mother	Jean-Patrick Benes & Allan Mauduit	
2009	Park Benches	Pascale	Bruno Podalydès	
2010	Toi, moi, les autres	Valérie	Audrey Estrougo	
2010	Le grand ménage	Myriam	Régis Musset	TV movie
2010	Le grand restaurant	A client	Gérard Pullicino	TV movie
2011	Le thanato	Klavinski	Frédéric Cerulli (2)	
2012	Houba! On the Trail of the Marsupilami	Documentary voice-over	Alain Chabat (3)	
2012	Victoire Bonnot	Agnès	Vincent Giovanni	TV series (1 episode)
2012	Bref	Herself	Bruno Muschio & Kyan Khojandi	TV series (1 episode)
2013	The Gilded Cage	Solange Caillaux	Ruben Alves	Alpe d'Huez International Comedy Film Festival - Best Acting; CinEuphoria Awards - Best Ensemble
2013	Grand départ	Danielle	Nicolas Mercier	
2013	Y'a pas d'âge	Sybille	Stéphane Marelli	TV series (1 episode)
2014	Serial (Bad) Weddings	Marie Verneuil	Philippe de Chauveron	
2014	Prêt à tout	Chantal	Nicolas Cuche	
2015	Memories	Nathalie Esnard	Jean-Paul Rouve	
2016	La Dream Team		Thomas Sorriaux	
2016	Vicky Banjo		Denis Imbert	
2016	Uchronia	Host	Christophe Goffette	
2016	Frères d'armes	Voice	Rachid Bouchareb	TV mini-series
2020	Sol	Sol Cortis	Jézabel Marques	
2024	Les Cadeaux	Françoise Stein	Raphaële Moussafir and Christophe Offenstein	
2025	Asterix and Obelix: The Big Fight	Roman Mother	Alain Chabat and Fabrice Joubert	Netflix mini-series (1 épisode)
