= Leave Your Hands on My Hips =

Laisse tes mains sur mes hanches
- Directed by: Chantal Lauby
- Written by: Chantal Lauby
- Produced by: Claudie Ossard
- Starring: Chantal Lauby; Claude Perron; Rossy de Palma
- Cinematography: Tetsuo Nagata
- Edited by: Marie-Josèphe Yoyotte
- Music by: Frédéric Talgorn
- Production companies: Bolloré Production; Champs-Élysées Productions; France 3 Cinéma; Les Films Alain Sarde; Victoires Productions
- Distributed by: ARP Sélection
- Release date: 2 April 2003 (France)
- Running time: 101 min
- Country: France
- Language: French
- Budget: $8.5 million
- Box office: $1.3 million

Laisse tes mains sur mes hanches (Leave Your Hands on My Hips) is a 2003 French comedy film directed, written and starring Chantal Lauby.

== Plot ==
Odile Rousselet is an actress of 42 years who lives with Mary, her 18-year-old daughter. When this one leaves to move in with her boyfriend, she finds herself alone and decided to get out more. It was at the carnival she makes new friends.

== Cast ==
- Chantal Lauby as Odile Rousselet
- Claude Perron as Nathalie
- Rossy de Palma as Myriam Bardem
- Jean-Hugues Anglade as Jérôme
- Jean-Pierre Martins as Kader
- Armelle Deutsch as Marie
- Alain Chabat as Bernard
- Dominique Besnehard as Gérald
- Françoise Lépine as Hélène
- Hélène Duc as Madame Tatin
- Maurice Chevit as Robert
- Françoise Bertin as Monique
- Dorothée Jemma as Alice
- Christophe Debonneuil as Guillaume
- Boris Terral as Eric
- Olga Sékulic as Aurélie
- Candide Sanchez as Guitou
- Jérôme Bertin as Jean-Pôl
- Jean-Luc Borras as Kevin
- Thomas Derichebourg as Miche
- David Saracino as Idir
- Khalid Maadour as Rachid
- Michaël Aragones as Pedro
- Dominique Farrugia as The dredger
- Claudie Ossard as The blond girl in the car
- Frédérique Bel as The girl near Pulpo
- Myriam Boyer as The concierge
- Bernard Menez as The concierge
- Daniel Isoppo as The concierge's friend
- Tatiana Gousseff as The assistant director

=== Cameo ===
- Salvatore Adamo
- Stéphane Bern
- Tony Gatlif
