= Jean-Marc Avocat =

French actor (c.1948–2020)

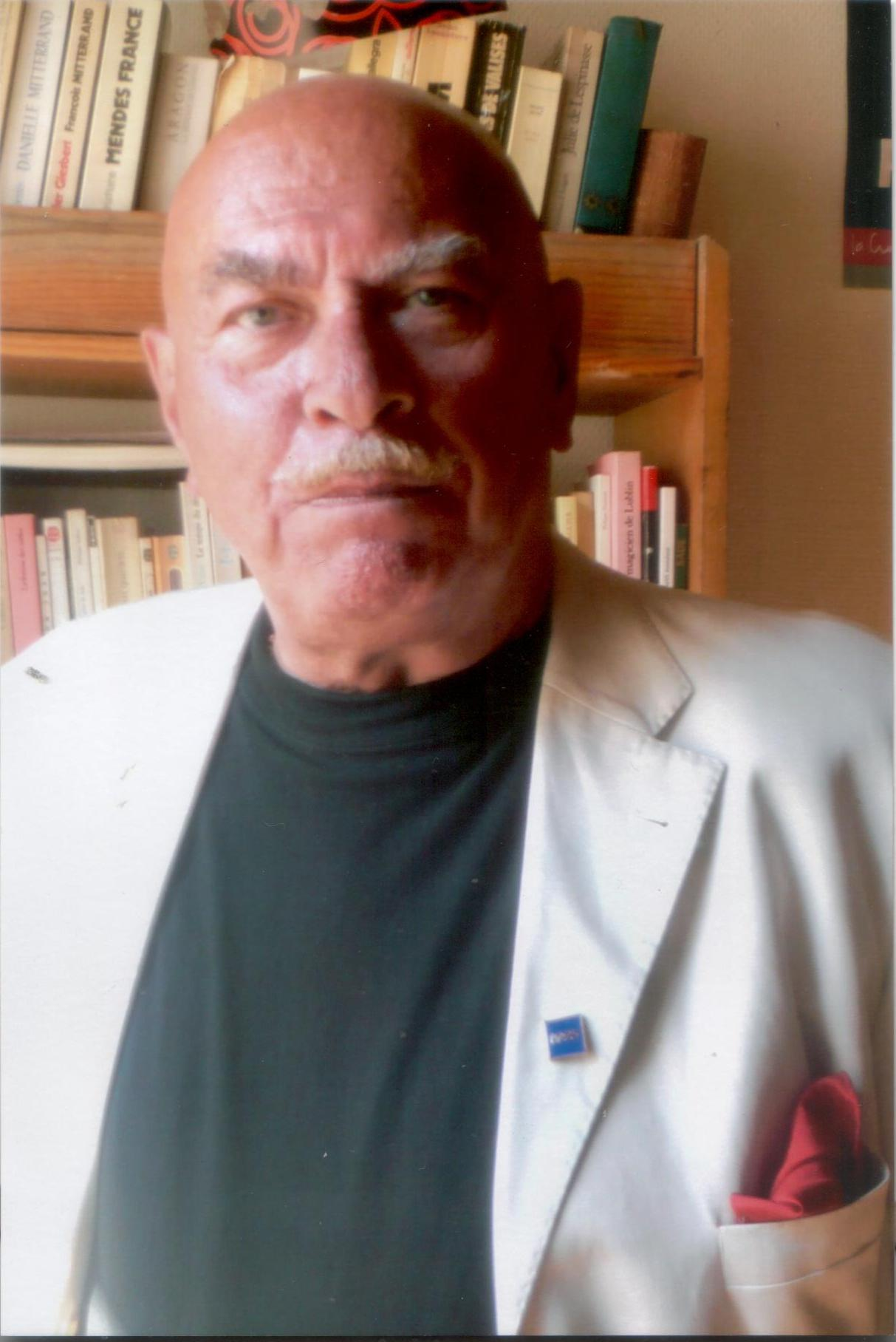
- Jean-Marc Avocat in 2011
- Born: c. 1948
- Died: 4 October 2020 (aged 71 or 72); Lyon, France
- Occupation: Actor

Jean-Marc Avocat (c. 1948 – 4 October 2020) was a French actor.

== Filmography ==
=== Cinema ===
- Verdict (1974)
- Le Mâle du siècle (1975)
- Le Matin du plus beau jour (1979)
- Allons z'enfants (1981)
- Blanche et Marie (1985)
- Paulette, la pauvre petite milliardaire (1986)
- Lucky Ravi (1986)
- Zone rouge (1986)
- Le Dénommé (1990)
- La Peur du vide (1999)
- Mon père, il m'a sauvé la vie (2001)

=== Television ===
- La Sourde Oreille (1980)
- Simon, la royauté du vent (1980)
- La Traque (1980)
- Le Rébus (1985)
- Le Cri de la chouette (1986)
- Cinéma 16 (1986)
- Les Enquêtes de Sans Atout (1989)
- Un otage de trop (1993)
- Les Yeux d'Hélène (1994)
- Le Retour d'Arsène Lupin (1995)
- L'Histoire du samedi - Les lauriers sont coupés (1997)
- Le Refuge (1998)
- Le Frère irlandais (1999)
- Louis la Brocante (2002)
- La Maîtresse du corroyeur (2003)
- Vive mon entreprise (2004)
- Chat bleu, chat noir (2007)
- La Louve (2007)
- Kaamelott (2009)
- La Maîtresse du président (2009)
- Un crime oublié (2012)
- Le Sang des Artoux (2012)
- Dérapage (2014)
- Accusé (2015)

== Theatre ==
- Les Misérables at the Théâtre des Célestins
