= Houba! On the Trail of the Marsupilami =

2012 French animated/live-action comedy film

- Film poster
- French: Sur la piste du Marsupilami
- Directed by: Alain Chabat
- Written by: Alain Chabat; Jeremy Doner
- Based on: Marsupilami by André Franquin
- Produced by: Alain Chabat
- Starring: Alain Chabat; Jamel Debbouze; Fred Testot; Lambert Wilson; Géraldine Nakache; Liya Kebede; Patrick Timsit; Jacques Weber; Aïssa Maïga
- Cinematography: Laurent Dailland
- Music by: Bruno Coulais
- Distributed by: Pathé
- Release date: 4 April 2012
- Running time: 105 minutes
- Countries: France; Belgium
- Language: French
- Budget: € 39.4 million
- Box office: € 48.4 million

Houba! On the Trail of the Marsupilami (original title: Sur la piste du Marsupilami) is a 2012 Franco-Belgian CGI animated/live-action comedy film co-written and directed by Alain Chabat. It is based on the comics series Marsupilami created by André Franquin.

== Plot ==
Dan Geraldo, a reporter who needs a scoop, arrives in Chiquito, Palombia, but he does not think that he is going to discover anything significant, other than an interview with the Paya; the indigenous tribes of Palombia. However, accompanied by the eccentric and poor vet and tour guide, Pablito, whose children dislike him and deem him a liar, Dan is told the myth of the Marsupilami, a mythical and extremely rare creature that is believed to inhabit the Palombian rainforest and to be a real species.

Meanwhile, 80-year-old botanist Hermoso discovers a beautiful but rare orchid, in which Marsupilami uses to cradle his eggs, manages to condense him into a liquid and drinks it, turning him to an early adult age. With the help of Caporal, a Palombian Army officer, he performs a coup d'état and imprisons General Pochero, the current dictator with a love for Celine Dion, while he plans to capture the Marsupilami, which had earlier stolen Hermoso's samples and is planned to be trained to take more orchids for Hermoso to stay young.

Dan and Pablito, after tracking in the jungle, are captured by the Paya. In their temple, they meet the beautiful Queen Paya, who gives a prophecy of Marsupilami (seen as the Guardian of the Jungle) being threatened by "the man with two faces". They are released, but after Dan insults Pablito and reveals that he isn't paying him, the two get into an argument and separate.

Pablito soon meets Marsupilami and discovers that he had a mate and a nest of eggs. Suddenly, the nest is torn down by the Palombian soldiers and Marsupilami is struck by a tranquilizer dart by Caporal. Hermoso, who has given himself the title General, finds more orchids, but also discovers the eggs. Pablito tries to stop them, but Dan bumps into him and they are both knocked out. He places both in an incubator at his presidential palace and gives Marsupilami to Caporal, seeing no use for it anymore.

Back in prison, the two find General Pochero, who manages to give in and escapes using a secret exit, arriving at the palace. Because Pochero enjoys hearing Celine Dion's "I'm Alive", he disguises himself as a woman, using the costumes of his mannequins, and distracts the Palombian soldiers, giving Pablito and Dan the chance to steal the orchids, eggs and a limousine before returning to Chiquito. Caporal is knocked out by Marsupilami and he escapes after the eggs. Hermoso discovers that the orchids and eggs were stolen, and furiously takes off in a military jeep after the trio.

Dan makes it to TV Palombia, and begins the show by explaining Marsupilami's existence. Pablito comes to his aid, after his video tape is missing, but realizes that he had accidentally erased the video; Marsupilami arrives to take his eggs, revealing himself on TV. Suddenly, Hermoso runs through the room with the jeep and nearly kills Marsupilami for his eggs, but the potion wears off and Hermoso shifts to an infant after drinking too much serum to regain his youth. Pablito is forgiven by his children, and Marsupilami is securely returned to his home in the jungle, with the now-hatched babies with his new parents.

== Cast ==
- Jamel Debbouze as Pablito Camaron, the eccentric vet/tour guide
- Alain Chabat as Dan Geraldo, a reporter
- Frédéric Testot as young and old Hermoso, a botanist and the antagonist
- Géraldine Nakache as Pétunia, Hermoso's assistant
- Lambert Wilson as General Pochero, president of Palombia
- Patrick Timsit as Caporal, the sadistic Palombian major-colonel
- Liya Kebede as Queen Paya
- The Great Khali as Bolo/"Petite Voix"
- Aïssa Maïga as Clarisse Iris, the announcer of TV Palombia
- Jacques Weber as Papa Dan, Dan Geraldo's father
- Chantal Lauby as The Voice
- Gerardo Taracena as Mateo
- Celine Dion as Herself
- Salah Benlemqawanssa as Performer Paya

== Production ==
Filming began on 20 September 2010 in Belgium and in Mexico.

== Reception ==
The film sold 251,265 tickets during its first run in France. It eventually topped the box-office with 5,303,302 tickets.

=== Other countries ===
Results on 2 August 2012:

- Belgium: 248,000 spectators
- Switzerland: 115,000 spectators
- Russia: 96,000 spectators

== Sequel ==
A sequel, simply titled Marsupilami, began filming mid-2024 and released February 4, 2026. Jamel Debbouze returned for the sequel, while Philippe Lacheau, Jean Reno, Élodie Fontan, and Tarek Boudali joined the cast. Lacheau also directed the film.
