= Artus de Penguern =

French actor and director (1957–2013)

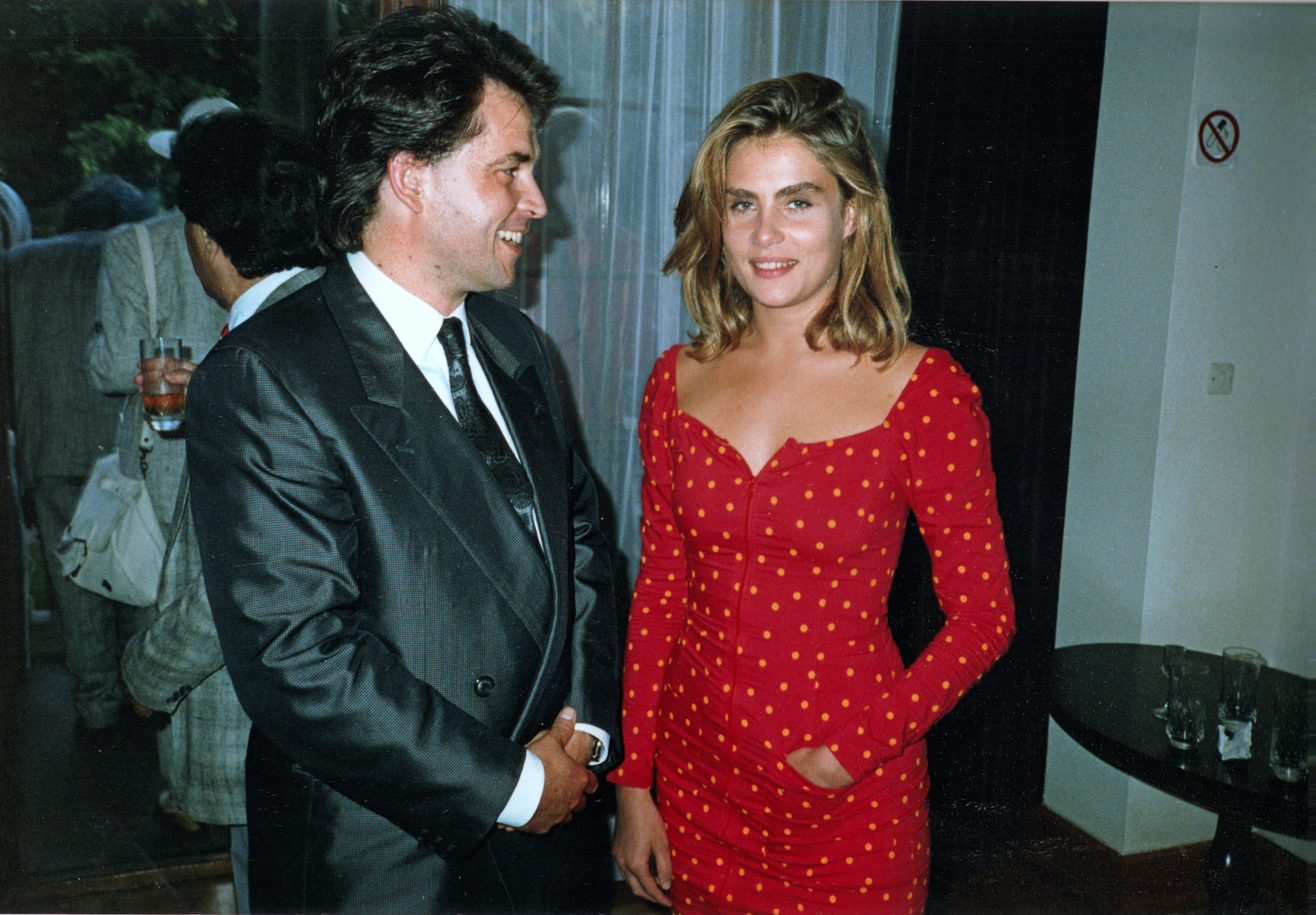
- de Penguern with Emmanuelle Seigner
- Born: 13 March 1957; Neuilly-sur-Seine, France
- Died: 14 May 2013 (aged 56); Paris, France
- Years active: 1977-2013

Artus de Penguern (13 March 1957 – 14 May 2013) was a French director, writer and actor of Breton descent.

== On stage ==
Year	Title	Author	Director	Notes
1977	La Ville dont le prince est un enfant	Henry de Montherlant	Jean Meyer	Théâtre des Mathurins
2006	Dieu habite Düsseldorf	Sébastien Thiéry	Christophe Lidon	Théâtre des Mathurins

== Filmography ==
Year	Title	Role	Director	Notes
1978	Il était un musicien	Robert Caby	Jean Valère	TV series (1 episode)
1980	La mort en sautoir	A hoodlum	Pierre Goutas	TV movie
1980	Il n'y a plus de héros au numéro que vous demandez	The military	Pierre Chabartier	TV movie
1982	Guy de Maupassant		Michel Drach	
1983	Prends ton passe-montagne, on va à la plage	Victor	Eddy Matalon	
1983	Danton		Andrzej Wajda	Uncredited
1984	Série noire		Édouard Niermans	TV series (1 episode)
1984	Mesrine	Inspector Lejeune	André Génovès	
1984	Femmes de personne		Christopher Frank	
1984	The Blood of Others		Claude Chabrol	Uncredited
1984	Liste noire	Inspector	Alain Bonnot	
1984	Une aventure de Phil Perfect	Phil Perfect	Dominique Masson	TV mini-series
1984	Rupture de stock		Claude Guymont	Short
1985	Urgence	Bernier	Gilles Béhat	
1985	Hôtel de police	PTT attendant	Jean-Pierre Prévost	TV series (1 episode)
1985	Police	Inspector	Maurice Pialat	
1985	Le 4ème pouvoir		Serge Leroy	
1986	Suivez mon regard		Jean Curtelin	
1986	Léon Blum à l'échelle humaine	M. Rabinof	Pierre Bourgeade & Jacques Rutman	TV movie
1987	Lévy et Goliath		Gérard Oury	
1987	Les Cinq Dernières Minutes	Jean Le Tiec	Gérard Gozlan	TV series (1 episode)
1987	Hôtel du Paradis	Patric	Jana Boková	
1987	Frantic	Waiter	Roman Polanski	
1987	Les enquêtes du commissaire Maigret	Lambescq	Gérard Gozlan	TV series (1 episode)
1989	The Saint: The Software Murders	Charles	Henry Herbert	TV movie
1990	Henry & June	Brassaï	Philip Kaufman	
1990	Moi, général de Gaulle	The French officer	Denys Granier-Deferre	TV movie
1991	The Favour, the Watch and the Very Big Fish	Saint Francis	Ben Lewin	
1991	Soalnik station		Pascal Graffin	Short
1992	Puissance 4	Pablo	Michel Lang	TV series (1 episode)
1992	O mon amour		Paul Minthe	Short
1992	Cocon		Martin Provost	Short
1993	Rêve d'amour	Man In Cafe	Nick Quinn	Short
1993	Roulez jeunesse!	Lionel	Jacques Fansten	
1993	Colis d'oseille	Yvon	Yves Lafaye	TV movie
1994	Love, Love, Love		Nick Quinn	Short
1994	Mina Tannenbaum	Naschich	Martine Dugowson	
1994	La Cité de la peur	Sens	Alain Berbérian	
1994	Les mots de l'amour	The boy	Vincent Ravalec	Short
1995	François Kléber	Didier	Patrick Jamain	TV series (1 episode)
1995	Les vacances de l'inspecteur Lester	Chamblin	Alain Wermus	TV movie
1995	Le homard	The lobster	Artus de Penguern	Short
1995-2005	Les boeuf-carottes	Judge Gautray	Various	TV series (5 episodes)
1996	Vacances bougeoises	Mathieu	Jean-Claude Brialy	TV movie
1996	Des nouvelles du bon Dieu	Salambo	Didier Le Pêcheur	
1996	Portraits chinois	Gérard	Martine Dugowson	
1996	Un bel après-midi d'été	Philippe	Artus de Penguern	Short
1996	Les lacets	Bruno Gavray	Stefan Le Lay	Short
1997	Salut l'angoisse	Quentin	Maurice Frydland	TV movie
1997	Une mère comme on n'en fait plus	Laurent	Jacques Renard	TV movie
1997	Ouvrez le chien		Pierre Dugowson	
1997	Les voisins	Monsieur Mercier	Artus de Penguern	Short
1998	La polyclinique de l'amour	Michael	Artus de Penguern	Short; Lille Short Film Festival - Best French Film
1998	Gratin		Yann Piquer	Short
1999	Belle maman	Pascal	Gabriel Aghion	
1999	Si les poules avaient des dents	Bernard	Pierre Dugowson	TV movie
1999	Le gang des TV		Artus de Penguern	Short
2000	Crimes en série	The lanky guy	Patrick Dewolf	TV series (1 episode)
2000	A Question of Taste	Flavert	Bernard Rapp	
2000	Les Misérables	Chabouillet	Josée Dayan	TV mini-series
2001	Amélie	Hipolito	Jean-Pierre Jeunet	
2001	Gregoire Moulin vs. Humanity	Grégoire Moulin	Artus de Penguern	Avignon Film Festival - Best Feature - France; Nominated - César Award for Best First Feature Film
2002	La merveilleuse odyssée de l'idiot Toboggan		Vincent Ravalec	(segment "Les mots de l'amour")
2002	L'odeur du melon dans la poubelle	Joël	Julien Donada	Short
2003	Marylin et ses enfants	Julien	Charli Beléteau	TV movie
2003	Toutes les filles sont folles	The internal	Pascale Pouzadoux	
2003	Les femmes ont toujours raison	Alain Berger	Élisabeth Rappeneau	TV movie
2003	Mon papa à moi		Stefan Le Lay	Short
2003	Changer tout	Alex	Élisabeth Rappeneau	TV movie
2003-2004	Avocats & associés	Adrien Varèse	Philippe Triboit, Patrice Martineau & Olivier Barma	TV series (11 episodes)
2004	Rien de grave	The instructor	Renaud Philipps	Short
2004	(Mon) Jour de chance	Jérôme	Nicolas Brevière	Short
2005	Félix Leclerc	Jean Dufour	Claude Fournier	TV mini-series
2005	Les gens honnêtes vivent en France	François Guérambois	Bob Decout	
2005	Saint-Jacques... La Mecque	Pierre	Coline Serreau	
2006	Commissaire Laviolette	Chabrand	Philomène Esposito	TV series (1 episode)
2006	U	Red	Serge Elissalde	Voice
2006	L'homme qui rêvait d'un enfant	Alfred	Delphine Gleize	
2007	Sécurité intérieure	Commissioner Paul Arrighi	Patrick Grandperret	TV mini-series
2007	Cut!	The man	Alain Riou	Short
2007	L'affaire Ben Barka	Merchant	Jean-Pierre Sinapi	TV movie
2007	L'invité	Bonnot	Laurent Bouhnik	
2007	Game of Four	François	Bruno Dega	
2007	Big City		Djamel Bensalah	
2008	Fool Moon	Thierry	Jérôme L'hotsky	
2008	Agathe Cléry	Hervé	Étienne Chatiliez	
2009	Le repenti		Olivier Guignard	TV movie
2010	La loi selon Bartoli	Dr. Nicolas Raspail	Laurence Katrian	TV series (1 episode)
2010	Au siècle de Maupassant	The Duke of Aubières	Jean-Daniel Verhaeghe	TV series (1 episode)
2011	Les belles soeurs	Francky	Gabriel Aghion	TV movie
2011	Un jour sans	Chindler	Yzabel Dzisky	Short
2012	La clinique de l'amour !	John Marchal	Artus de Penguern & Gábor Rassov	
2012	La fleur de l'âge	Joseph Tellier	Nick Quinn	
2014	Asterix: The Land of the Gods	Petiminus	Louis Clichy & Alexandre Astier	Voice, (final film role)
