= Kaamelott =

French TV series

- Genre: Medieval fantasy Comedy
- Created by: Alexandre Astier
- Written by: Alexandre Astier
- Directed by: Alexandre Astier
- Starring: Alexandre Astier; Lionnel Astier; Joëlle Sevilla; Thomas Cousseau; Anne Girouard; Franck Pitiot; Jean-Christophe Hembert; Simon Astier; Nicolas Gabion; Jacques Chambon; Audrey Fleurot
- Theme music composer: Alexandre Astier
- Country of origin: France
- Original language: French
- No. of seasons: 6
- No. of episodes: 458 (list of episodes)

Production
- Running time: Seasons 1 to 3: 100 x 3 min 30; Season 4: 98 x 3 min 30 + 1 x 7 min; Season 5: 50 x 7 min or 8 x 52 min in Director's Cut; Season 6: 9 x 40 min

Original release
- Network: M6
- Release: January 3, 2005 – October 31, 2009

Kaamelott is a French comedy medieval fantasy television series created, directed, written, scored, and edited by Alexandre Astier, who also starred as the main character. Based on Arthurian legends, it followed the daily lives of King Arthur (Alexandre Astier) and his Knights of the Round Table in Camelot. The series, which originally ran for six seasons (referred to as "books"), aired from 3 January 2005 to 31 October 2009 on the network M6.

The series was preceded in 2003 by a short film, Dies iræ, with mostly the same cast and concept, which was used to pitch the idea to the network, which at the time was looking to replace another successful short TV series, Caméra Café. However, Kaamelott exceeded Caméra Café's audience in only three weeks after broadcasting started. It is widely regarded as one of the best, most iconic, and most popular French TV series of all time. It has also been praised for its fidelity, as, aside from comedic and linguistic liberties, it remains faithful to the mythology and historical context, both alleged and verified.

While the series takes place in the 5th century, it uses modern language and situations to offer a humorous take on the Arthurian legend. However, in later seasons, the mood becomes darker and more dramatic as Arthur's kingdom begins to disintegrate. The cast includes regular Astier collaborator Jean-Christophe Hembert (Karadoc), who directed his two subsequent one-man shows, and Astier's father, Lionnel (Leodegrance), his mother, Joëlle Sevilla (Dame Séli), and his half-brother, Simon (Yvain).

After the series ended in 2009, Astier began work on a film trilogy to conclude the series' story. First announced in 2012 and planned for shooting in 2013, production on the first film, Kaamelott: The First Chapter, was suspended and repeatedly postponed due to various issues; filming eventually began in January 2019, and it was released on 21 July 2021. Following the release of the first movie, Astier confirmed that the story would be continued in two parts rather than a single sequel. Kaamelott: The Second Chapter - Part 1 was released on 22 October 2025.

== Episodes ==
=== Format and broadcast ===
The episode format for Kaamelott was at first very short. Unaired pilot episodes attempted a six-minute format that was rejected by the television network. Broadcast episodes from seasons 1 to 4 lasted about three and a half minutes, the same as Caméra Café. These seasons are made up of 100 short episodes, and originally seven such seasons were planned by Astier and M6. A season is referred to as a "livre" (French for "book") in the promotional material and DVD covers.

The episodes were broadcast on M6 in France starting in 2005 in prime time (8:30 PM to 8:40 PM), twice every weeknight evening for seasons 1–4. The week's full ten episodes were aired on the Saturday of that same week. Each such season lasted ten weeks. A week's worth of episodes is about 35 minutes, comparable to the American one-hour network format of ca. 44 minutes or the British half-hour format of 30 minutes. Each episode features a teaser, opening titles, three acts, closing titles, and a tag, like an American sitcom episode. Season 1 aired early in 2005, 2 in fall 2005, 3 early in 2006, and 4 in fall 2006.

Each season attracted more viewers, with records reaching about 5 million viewers each evening.

The first half of season 5 aired in spring 2007 as two 52-minute episodes, followed by 5 weeks of 7-minute episodes (telling the same story, but with additional material) presented on the same schedule as the earlier seasons. The second half followed the same format in the fall of 2007.

Season 4 was the first to feature an overarching story arc. Whereas in the earlier seasons one could watch the short episodes in any order, in season 4 more than half the episodes were connected to a plot (and episodes 99 and 100 form a single episode with no break).

Season 5 features several intertwining plots presented chronologically throughout the season. This presented storytelling and editing problems that were incompatible with the old 3½-minute format, resulting in at least 3 different versions of season 5: 3 52-minute episodes as televised, 50 7-minute episodes as televised, and 8 52-minute episodes in the DVD "director's cut." In the interview on the DVD, Astier explains that season 5 must be seen in the director's cut version.

Season 6 was always conceived of, from the time shooting began, as a series of 40-minute episodes presented as a miniseries, not cut into shorter episodes.

Around the time that shooting began on season 6, Astier announced that there would be no season 7. Season 6 consists of a prequel (how Arthur became king of Britain) followed by an episode that serves as a sequel to season 5.

Season 6 had a theatrical premiere as part of the "Paris fait sa comédie" festival, with a screening of 7 episodes at the Grand Rex on 25 March 2009. The Livre was shown on M6 in October and November 2009 as a series of nine 40-minute episodes, three each Saturday night. The ratings for Livre 6 were relatively low (2.2-2.65 million), perhaps because the DVD was expected to hit the market almost immediately afterwards.

The series has also been shown on TSR2 in Switzerland, on Club RTL in Belgium, and on Historia in Canada.

Astier hopes to follow the television series with a trilogy of Arthur films. He has said that the last episode of season 6 prepares the audience for the movie series.

=== Production ===
From the beginning, the series was shot in widescreen, and the photography was comparable to that of a movie. Thus, on the surface, the film is a drama rather than a sitcom.

As the series goes on, there are more and more exteriors. Seasons 1-4 take place almost entirely in or near the fortress of Kaamelott. For the first two seasons, the interiors were shot in Paris, but production moved to Lyon for the third season (entailing changes in some sets, particularly Merlin's Laboratory). The castle exteriors are filmed at Montmelas-Saint-Sorlin, a medieval castle near Lyon. Parts of seasons 5 and 6 were filmed in Brittany, and some of season 6 was filmed in Rome at the Cinecittà Studios on the sets built for HBO's Rome.

The shooting schedule for 100 episodes was 50 days in the early seasons, later expanding to 60 days; Astier prepares the scenarios for the entire season in advance. To shoot as economically and quickly as possible, all the scenes using a particular set (especially exteriors) are shot consecutively. This gives each season its own texture, since an exterior setting will always have the same weather, more or less, and characters wear the same clothing in a particular setting when it reappears across episodes. The last 12 episodes of season 2 were shot at the same time as the season 3 episodes.

Costuming continuity is achieved in the first season simply by having the principal characters dressed the same in nearly every episode. Knights seated at the Round Table wear armor in the first four seasons, and in the first season, they also wear armor in battle exteriors. Through the first five seasons, though new costumes are introduced, Karadoc usually wears red, Perceval blue, Lancelot off-white, and Bohort green (in a few episodes, Sir Herve appears in a yellow costume). Arthur wears blacks with deep reds and purples; Leodagan wears gray or gray-blue and black.

Astier usually writes the actual dialogue the night before a scene is shot. Thus, if a three-minute episode includes an exterior scene, a bedroom scene, and a hallway scene, the actors would be learning their lines for the episode (along with the lines for other bits of episodes using that set) on three different days.

== Content ==
The series title refers, of course, to Arthur's fortress, Camelot; the peculiar spelling may come from the Old French Kamaalot, a form found in the 13th-century French Lancelot-Grail cyclical romances. The double A forms the monogram of the show's creator, and the title generates puns based on the French word camelote ("cheap junk").

=== Genre ===
The short format of the first four seasons demanded a comic structure, with each episode ending on an ironic note that would twist the situation presented into a memorable whole. Thus, the series was perceived as pure comedy—parody, satire, sitcom, or "so British," meaning a straight-faced historical send-up in the style of Rowan Atkinson's Blackadder or Monty Python and the Holy Grail. Astier had a lot of explaining to do when season 5 turned out to be very dark, full of terrible obsessions and passions. Season 5 also featured a move to a different format; it was broadcast in both short and longer segments, and the DVD cut resembled a dramatic miniseries. Season 6 was conceived and edited solely as a miniseries, with long episodes telling a primarily dramatic story and incidental comic elements.

Fantasy elements have been limited, undoubtedly to some extent by the budget. However, a few episodes suggest the possibility of an intersection of the traditional Arthurian world of fairies and wizards with science fiction (see the description of Perceval's character below).

=== Historical and traditional content ===
Although the show was initially perceived as pure comedy, in many ways it follows the medieval Arthurian legends, including such traditional characters as Lancelot, Guenièvre, Bohort (Bors), Perceval, Merlin, and the Lady of the Lake, as well as the Holy Grail and the sword Excalibur. The early seasons often include twists on traditional Arthurian or medieval themes, which might delight scholars; historians Eric Le Nabour and Martin Aurell have published two books based on the series, and a number of distinguished medievalists are interviewed in the 5-part documentary "Aux sources de Kaamelott" by Christophe Chabert, which accompanies the DVD sets.

Like other 21st-century Arthurian versions such as King Arthur and The Last Legion, this one emphasizes Arthur's ties with Rome and its empire. In season 1 of Kaamelott, several characters speak of adventures in Rome, but Arthur does not seem to like Roman art, food, etc.; however, in subsequent seasons, his Roman connections become important to his character and history. Season 6 tells the story of how Arthur, a Roman policeman, comes to understand his destiny and takes the crown of Britain.

Traditionally, Arthurian romance includes fantasy elements, but Astier may eventually intend to connect them to science fiction. He includes references to Stargate (Perceval travels through one in episodes in Livres 2 and 3) and Star Wars (in the Livre 3 Stargate episode, Perceval visits Tatooine and brings back a light-saber, which Arthur perceives as much like Excalibur; also, in Livre 1, Bohort, the minister of protocol, sometimes seems very much like C-3PO!). The first episode, entitled "Silbury Hill," suggests the presence of spiritual beings everywhere in Britain, but "Silbury Hill II" implies they are extraterrestrials and that Arthur and Léodagan know this. In Livre VI, we learn that Perceval was found as a baby in a crop circle, which, if these are made by space travellers from other planets, explains his affinity for stargates. Supernatural beings encountered by Arthur include Morgan Le Fay (not his sister, but involved with his eventual fate), Méléagant, the emissary of gods who seem to want to destroy human rulers, and his guide, the Lady of the Lake; at the beginning of Livre VI.2, a meeting of the gods whom the Lady of the Lake represents is depicted on Alpha Centauri, which implies that they at least are beings whose home is "the stars" rather than on earth. Thus, rather than recording relationships between humans and fairies, Kaamelott seems to posit relationships between Arthur and superior beings from other parts of the universe.

Like all Arthurian stories, Kaamelott twists history as well and adds its own view of where Arthur came from and what his reign means. Roman Britain had contributed armies, generals, and maybe an emperor to the Roman empire, but in Kaamelott, Britain is an aggregate of kingdoms that perceives Rome as an occupying force and Arthur perhaps as a Pétain for having made peace with the Romans. The enemies of the historical Britons in the 5th century were the Picts to the north, the Irish (aka the Scots), and the north Germanic tribes (Angles, Saxons, and Jutes) who had originally been brought in as mercenaries to fight the Picts. Arthur enters history as the victor of 12 battles between the British and the Saxons and is also often depicted fighting the Picts and the Scots in the north. Astier's Arthur, by contrast, apparently stays close to his fortress Kaamelott, where he is attacked by Angles and Saxons but also by Attila and his Hun, Burgundians, Ostrogoths, Vandals, Vikings, Visigoths—just about every "barbarian" people that was on the move in Europe then (though Attila was active earlier and the Vikings later), except for the Franks, ancestors of the French (though a historically Frankish leader, Chlodoric, does lead "barbarians" against Arthur). The Picts, however, represented by Arthur's mother-in-law, Séli, and the Irish, represented by a federated king, are Arthur's allies in Kaamelott. The geopolitics of Kaamelott resembles that of the comic book world of Asterix—a small, primitive "Celtic" society with its druid, warrior, and secret weapon, persisting on the edges of the Roman Empire—more than traditional English or American versions of the Arthur story.

=== Comic devices ===
The main comical device of the series is to explore the distance between conventional "epic" presentations of Arthurian legend and the actual day-to-day operations of Arthur and his knights as they seek the Holy Grail. Arthur is surrounded by incompetent, lazy knights, easily frightened or distracted, who fail most of their missions or find but then discard invaluable artifacts, not understanding the nature of their quest. They speak an everyday language, full of slang and not very articulate; when someone does try to express a complex idea in a complex and exact way, he (usually Arthur, sometimes Bohort) is usually not understood and comes off as rather silly. Moreover, the characters all use the formal second person to address each other—a grammatical feature not present in English, but which produces a hilarious contrast between rude or slangy comments and the formality of expression: “Scram, sir,” or “Get in the tub with me, sir—you're filthy,” or “Madam, you are a fish-faced trollop.” Such a feature, as well as the use of many colloquialisms (sometimes very obscure or simply invented by the writer), makes it close to impossible to translate and thus convey the humorous dialogue in other languages than French. Verbal comedy can also be heightened by having the characters speak with their mouths full.

The series also uses slapstick for humor (e.g. a cream-cheese fight in season 3 "La Grande Bataille"), and running gags, which may be verbal ("La Botte Secrète," the use of the phrase “You're not wrong” to keep up one end of a conversation one does not understand), physical ("Unagi," the completely absurd martial arts developed by Karadoc and Perceval; the silly caps the characters wear to bed), musical (the song "À la volette" which recurs through the first season), or character-specific (Merlin's conflict between his role as healer-scientist and the court's idea of a magician, Karadoc's truly Gargantuan need for food, Arthur interrupted in his bath by various incursions). There is little sexual romance; none of the knights seems genuinely interested in women (or other men), and Arthur's relations with his various mistresses are more a comic device than a matter of emotion. Guenièvre, for a reason left mysterious in the first 5 seasons, remains a virgin, and this too is a source of comedy as she tries to figure out, for example, why she can't get pregnant. As the characters become familiar, dramatic or emotional situations can arise from this kind of comedy.

The series occasionally gives humorous (but always possible) explanations for historical facts. For instance, Kaamelott explains the creation of Scotland's national attire, the kilt, as a misfortune of the king of Caledonia (modern Scotland). His armor's legs rusted when he fell into some water. It turns out to be a rule that a knight of the Round Table must wear either full-body armor or his national attire, so the king of Caledonia wraps a cloth around his waist and declares it his country's official attire.

=== Social and psychological problems ===
The comic skits sometimes include serious reflections on themes such as war, capital punishment, and bureaucracy, among others. The lead character, King Arthur of Britain (or Logres), has very progressive ideas and tries to abolish the slave trade, torture, and capital punishment. His ideas usually clash with those of his father-in-law and minister of war and justice, Léodagan "Le Sanguinaire" ("the Bloodthirsty"). Arthur also clashes with Lancelot, his prime minister and chief of staff, who believes that the Round Table and the Grail Quest should be for an elite, not for the self-selected group of rather ordinary men who have answered Arthur's call. Both Léodagan and Lancelot are exasperated by the shenanigans of the so-called knights, and Arthur is torn between admitting they are pretty useless and insisting that they are worthy of the Grail.

Even the idiotic characters, however, are given qualities that explain Arthur's patience with them and make them more likable and interesting to the viewer. For instance, Perceval of Wales first appears in medieval literature in the work of Chrétien de Troyes as both the destined Grail Knight and a clumsy, foolish boy. In Kaamelott, he is the only character besides Arthur for whom Excalibur glows when it is picked up. But he is the least confident of the knights, and for good reason. He is not sure of his own name. He fails almost every mission he is entrusted with. He is illiterate, cannot understand the concept of a map, and insists that North and South are relative concepts. On the other hand, he loves and is extremely faithful to Arthur. In Book 5, Arthur puts Excalibur back into the stone to show challengers to the throne, from all over the country, who come to try to take the magical sword back out again, that only he is the rightful king. Some of Arthur's knights and allies do try their luck with the sword, but Perceval refuses and convinces his fellow knight Karadoc to do the same. Astier has described Perceval as "naïve but lucid" and (provocatively) as "the most intelligent" of the knights in his analysis of the sword in the stone situation. Perceval dreams of space travel and, at one point, tries to explain the theory of special relativity to Arthur. He can also count people or objects at a glance (such as the stones in the fortress of Kaamelott) and grasp the "values" of cards or objects in complicated games. In Livre 6, we learn one possible explanation for Perceval's peculiarities: his parents found him in a crop circle; in Livre III.i.22, it is strongly implied that crop circles are made by visiting extraterrestrials. So he may not be human at all.

=== Plot ===
The plot of the series, up through season 5, centers on a conflict between King Arthur and his best knight, Lancelot. This begins with a few episodes in Season 1 in which we see that Lancelot is in love with Arthur's queen, Guenièvre. In season 2, Lancelot begins to challenge Arthur; he feels that if Arthur were an effective king, justice would have been established and the knights of the Round Table would be great warriors instead of the clowns ("pantins") they actually are. In season 3, Lancelot decides to go live in the woods as a "chevalier errant" or wandering knight, and in season 4, his hermitage becomes a fortress, and he begins recruiting men. In season 4, Guenièvre joins Lancelot, and Arthur breaks various "laws" by trying to remarry with Mevanwi, Karadoc's wife; however, at the end, he retrieves his wife, who has had enough of camping out, and Lancelot despairs. Season 5's main plots show Lancelot and Arthur separately voyaging into their own pasts and futures as their conflict builds to a real cliffhanger in the final episode. We learn that these two men have been in competition for the throne of Britain since they were born. In season 5, Arthur also resigns his kingship, and Leodagan and Karadoc attempt to rule in his place. Season 6 consists of a flashback to a period 15 years earlier, showing how Arthur came to power in Britain as a representative of the Roman Empire but also as the chosen of the gods, the only man who can wield Excalibur. We also see how he ended up with such an odd group of "knights" and with a wife with whom he cannot be intimate.

The final episode of season 6 brings us back to the season 5 cliffhanger, with Arthur still alive but very ill. Lancelot, given power by Arthur based on the latter's enduring trust in him, ravages the island and destroys the Round Table, both physically and spiritually. The final words of the episode, projected over a recovering Arthur, leading into the projected movie trilogy, are "Soon Arthur will once again be a hero."

== Casting ==
=== Main cast ===
==== Knights of the Round Table ====
Actor	Character	Position/Relation	Books
Alexandre Astier	King Arthur	King of Britain	1–6
Thomas Cousseau	Lancelot du Lac	King's Prime Minister, later a knight errant and even regent during Arthur's absence. He thus starts out as Arthur's most trusted friend and becomes his worst opponent.	1–6
Lionnel Astier	Léodagan, King of Carmélide	Arthur's father-in-law, Minister of Defence and Justice	1–6
Nicolas Gabion	Bohort of Gaunnes	Lancelot's cousin, minister of Protocol	1–6
Franck Pitiot	Perceval	Knight of Wales, Karadoc's best friend	1–6
Jean-Christophe Hembert	Karadoc	Knight of Vannes, Perceval's best friend	1–6
Stéphane Margot	Calogrenant	King of Caledonia	1–6
Simon Astier	Yvain, Knight of the Lion	Léodagan's son and Arthur's brother-in-law	1–6
Aurélien Portehaut	Gauvain	Arthur's nephew	1–6
Alexis Hénon	Galessin, Duke of Orkney	Liegeman of King Loth	1–6
Tony Saba	Hervé of Rinel	Knight	1–6
Antoine de Caunes	Dagonet	Knight	1, 4–6
Brice Fournier	Kadoc	Karadoc's brother	2–6
Etienne Fague	Lionel of Gaunnes	Bohort's brother is appointed knight of the Round Table later on, when many other knights have already left Arthur's side	5–6

==== Court of Kaamelott ====
Actor	Character	Position/Relation	Books
Anne Girouard	Guenièvre, Queen of Britain	Léodagan's daughter and Arthur's wife	1–6
Joëlle Sevilla	Dame Séli	Léodagan's wife and Guenièvre's mother	1–6
Jacques Chambon	Merlin	Enchanter of Britain	1–6
Jean-Robert Lombard	Father Blaise	Priest of Kaamelott, keeper of the archives	1–6
Christian Bujeau	The Master of Arms	Arthur's personal trainer	1–6
Caroline Ferrus	Dame Mevanwi	Karadoc's wife, also Arthur's wife briefly	2–6
Bruno Fontaine	Elias of Kelliwic'h	Great Enchanter of the North, Merlin's rival	1–5
Thibault Roux	Grüdü	Arthur's bodyguard	1–4
Vanessa Guedj	Angharad	Guenièvre's lady's maid	1–4
Valérie Kéruzoré	Nessa	King's maid	4–5
Caroline Pascal	Demetra	Arthur's mistress	1–5
Magali Saadoun	Aziliz	Arthur's mistress, Tumet's twin sister	2–4, 6
Alexandra Saadoun	Tumet	Arthur's mistress, Aziliz' twin sister	2–4, 6
Anne-Valérie Soler	Aelis	Arthur's mistress	3–5

==== Other characters ====
Actor	Character	Position/Relation	Books
Audrey Fleurot	The Lady of the Lake/Viviane	Messenger from the Gods	1–6
Josée Drevon	Ygerne of Tintagel	Arthur's mother	1–6
Loïc Varraut	Venec	Slave trader and "party planner"	1–6
Alain Chapuis	The Innkeeper	Innkeeper in the village near Kaamelott	1–6
Serge Papagalli	Guethenoc	Peasant, Roparzh's neighbour and rival	1–6
Gilles Graveleau	Roparzh	Peasant, Guethenoc's neighbour and rival	1–6
Bruno Salomone	Caius Camillus	Roman centurion	1–4, 6
Guillaume Briat	King of the Burgundians	Arthur's enemy in the early seasons, then becomes his ally in the war against Lancelot.	1–4, 6
Bruno Boëglin	Sven, Chief of the Vikings	Arthur's enemy	1–4, 6
Truong Lan	Attila	Arthur's enemy	1–4
François Rollin	Loth, King of Orkney	Arthur's brother-in-law, Gauvain's father	3–6
Valentin Traversi	Ketchatar, King of Ireland	Member of the Kings' Assembly	3, 6
Eddy Letexier	Hoël, King of Armorica	Member of the Kings' Assembly	3, 6
Carlo Brandt	Méléagant	The Response	4–6
Alban Lenoir	Ferghus	Lancelot's aide-de-camp	4
Luc Chambon	Nathair	Spy	4
Emmanuel Meirieu	Appius Manilius	Arthur's best friend in Rome	6
Patrick Chesnais	Lucius Silius Sallustius	Roman Senator, many think he is the real leader of Rome, not Caesar or the Senate.	6
François Levantal	Publius Servius Capito	Sallustius' hand man	6
Marion Creusvaux	Julia	Arthur's girlfriend	6
Valeria Cavalli	Aconia Minor	Arthur's tutor and, secretly, his spouse	6

Many of them are friends or family of Alexandre Astier and have already worked with him. Family members include his father, Lionnel (Léodagan); his half-brother, Simon (Yvain); his mother, Joëlle Sevilla (Dame Séli); and Simon's mother, Josée Drevon (Ygerne). They, along with many of the actors in the series, are part of the theater scene in Lyon.

Almost all the actors have been invited by Astier to join the show directly because he had formerly worked with them or was familiar with their work. He only writes the dialogue once he knows the actor's voice, musicality, and speaking style. Thus, he seldom casts actors for pre-existing roles or characters, but the few from a casting session are Anne Girouard (Guenièvre), Caroline Ferrus (Mevanwi), Vanessa Guedj (Angharad), Caroline Pascal (Demetra), and Guillaume Briat (King of the Burgundians).

Initially, Antoine de Caunes (Dagonet), Christian Bujeau (The Master of Arms), François Rollin (King Loth), and Bruno Salomone (Caius Camillus) were only guest stars, but eventually they joined the main cast.

Like Astier (Arthur, director and writer), some actors shared their acting duties with technical crew responsibilities. These are Jean-Christophe Hembert (Karadoc/art director), Emmanuel Meirieu (Appius Manilius/graphic designer), Stéphane Margot (Calogrenant/stunt coordinator), and Christian Bujeau (the Master of Arms/swordmaster).

Due to the large cast and the original short format, many characters, even important ones, appear in only a few episodes. The only characters to appear in more than 100 of the 458 episodes are King Arthur (446), Léodagan (228), Perceval (195), Karadoc (172), Lancelot (157), Guenièvre (154), Bohort (138), and Father Blaise (105).

=== Guest stars ===
Thanks to its immediate success, the show attracted many guest stars, including director Alain Chabat, actors Christian Clavier, Tchéky Karyo, and Émilie Dequenne, and TV anchor Virginie Efira.

Actor	Character	Position/Relation	Books	#Episodes
Émilie Dequenne	Edern, the Female Knight	Knight of the Round Table	1	1
Yvan Le Bolloc'h	Breccan	The manufacturer of the Round Table	1	1
Emma de Caunes	Azénor	Arthur's kleptomaniac mistress	1	2
Didier Bénureau	Buzit	A bard	1	1
Lorànt Deutsch	The Interpreter	Interpreter of the King of the Burgundians	1	1
Georges Beller	Jacca	Knight of the Round Table	1	1
Marcel Phillipot	Monsignor Boniface	Bishop of Germania	1	1
Élie Semoun	The Witch Hunter	The fanatic Papal Legate to Kaamelott	1–4	5
Philippe Nahon	Goustan the Cruel	Léodagan's father	1, 6	7
Barbara Schulz	Madenn	Guethenoc's daughter	1	1
Léa Drucker	Morgan le Fay	Sorceress	1, 5	2
Denis Maréchal	Narsès	Byzantine general	1, 6	2
François Morel	Belt	Peasant and winemaker	2, 6	2
Bernard Le Coq	Feamac	A forgotten prisoner	2	1
Arsène Mosca	The Moorish Chief	Arthur's diplomatic guest	2	1
Bruno Solo	The Banner-bearer	A disastrous messenger	2	1
Axelle Laffont	Séfriane of Aquitaine	Niece of the Duke of Aquitaine	3	1
Ged Marlon	The Ankou	Servant of Death	3	1
Pascal Vincent	Urgan, the Gudgeon Man	Professional murderer	3, 6	2
Virginie Efira	Dame Berlewen	Bohort's wife	3, 6	2
Claire Nadeau	Cryda of Tintagel	Ygerne's sister and Arthur's aunt	3–6	6
Valérie Benguigui	Prisca	Sibyl	3, 5	5
Roland Giraud	Robyn	Robin Hood lookalike peasants leader	3	1
Laurent Gamelon	The cheater	Player of bonneteau	3	1
Alain Chabat	The Duke of Aquitaine	Kaamelott's distinguished guest	5	4
Géraldine Nakache	The Duchess of Aquitaine	The Duke's new wife	5	3
Christian Clavier	The Jurisconsult	The law expert hired to find a new king	5	7
Guy Bedos	Anton	Arthur's adoptive father	5	1
Anouk Grinberg	Anna of Tintagel	Arthur's half-sister, Loth's wife and Gauvain's mother	5–6	4
Patrick Bouchitey	The Fisherman	Father of Aziliz and Tumet, the twin sisters	5	1
Anne Benoît	Drusilla		6	5
Marthe Villalonga	Granny	Perceval's grandmother	6	3
Jackie Berroyer	Pellinor	Perceval's father	6	3
Manu Payet	Verinus	Lemon stallholder in Rome	6	7
Tchéky Karyo	Manius Macrinus Firmus	Roman Governor of Britain	6	7
Jean-Marc Avocat	Titus Nipius Glaucia	Officer of the Cohortes urbanae	6	6
Frédéric Forestier	Aulus Milonius Procyon	Glaucia's right-hand man	6	6
Pierre Mondy	Cæsar Imperator	Roman Emperor	6	5
Frédérique Bel	Helvia	The Emperor's maid	6	4

== Trivia ==
Alexandre Astier dedicated Kaamelott to the French comedy giant Louis de Funès.

== Accolades ==
Year	Awards	Category	Recipient	Result
2006	Globes de Cristal Award	Best TV Movie / TV Series	Alexandre Astier & Alain Kappauf	Won

== DVD details ==
=== French editions ===
Livres 1-3 were issued in two single-disc "tomes" for purchase individually (each containing 50 episodes).

The 6 Livres have each been issued in a complete ("intégrale") "collector's edition" (3 discs each for Livres 1–4, 4 discs each for Livres 5–6) with bonus material including blooper reels (aka "bêtisier"), pilots, documentaries, and previews of the next season. This edition has a “bound-book” look (in the style of the Lord of the Rings collectors’ editions) and interior illustrations by Jérome Jouvray.

The bonus materials ("Addendum") in the collector's sets include: Livre 1, Dies irae and the pilots, bêtisier (i.e. blooper reel); Livre 2, documentary "Aux Sources de Kaamelott: Les Moeurs et les Femmes," bêtisier, teasers for Livres 1–3; Livre 3, documentary "Aux Sources de Kaamelott: La Magie et l'Eglise," bêtisier, trailer for Livre 4 and for the first comic book; Livre 4, documentary "Aux Sources de Kaamelott: L'Art de la Guerre," bêtisier, trailer for Livre 5 and for the second comic book; Livre 5, interview with Alexandre Astier (wandering around the Cinecitta Rome set), documentary "Aux Sources de Kaamelott: La Géopolitique du Royaume," bêtisier, trailer for Livre 6; Livre 6, documentary "Aux Sources de Kaamelott: Les Chevaliers de la Table Ronde," Making Of documentary, bêtisier

Livres 5 and 6 were released as a 3-disc Blu-ray set alongside the regular (4-disc) DVD set. Since the entire series has been shot in HD, Blu-ray issues of previous livres are possible.

All the collectors' editions have French subtitles for the deaf and hard-of-hearing as an option for Kaamelott itself. Livres 4, 5, and 6 also have English subtitles. None of the Addendum films has subtitles.

=== Other editions ===
A Canadian (Region 1) edition of Livres 1 and 2 (similar to the French Collector's Edition) was released in 2009 by Alliance Vivafilm. The edition is in French (menus, episode titles, etc.), but the episodes have English subtitles. The Addendum episodes (Dies Irae, pilots) do not have subtitles. The artwork inside the case differs from that in the French edition.

== Spin-off ==
Alexandre Astier has begun publishing the scripts for the series with Éditions Télémaque:

- Kaamelott Livre I Texte Intégral : Episodes 1 à 100 (2009). Includes some episodes that were not filmed.
- Kaamelott Livre II Texte Intégral : Episodes 1 à 100 (2009)

Five comic books inspired by Kaamelott were published from November 2006 to November 2010, with stories by Alexandre Astier and art by Steven Dupré. They can be read in any order:

- L'Armée du Nécromant (The Necromancer's Army)
- Les Sièges de Transport (The Transporter Seats)
- L'Enigme du Coffre (The Mystery of the Strongbox)
- Perceval et le Dragon d'Airain (Perceval and the Iron Dragon)
- Le Serpent Géant du Lac de l'Ombre (The Giant Snake of the Shadow Lake)

Eric Le Nabour and Martin Aurell have published two books that examine the series in the context of medieval history and Arthurian legend.

- Kaamelott: Au coeur du moyen âge. Perrin, 2007. (ISBN 978-2-262-02630-1).
- Kaamelott: A la table du roi Arthur. Perrin, 2007 (ISBN 978-2262027094).

4 tie-in items (Arthur's Oghma amulet, a mug, a notebook, and a 2009 calendar) were premiums with the purchase of a "Menu Top" at the Quick hamburger chain in late 2008 and early 2009.

On 2 November 2015, after several years of conflict with the producer, Alexandre Astier announced that the conflict was over and that his project of feature films, whose storyline would follow the sixth season, had resumed. The shooting started in January 2019.
