= La Cité de la peur =

La Cité de la Peur
- Theatrical poster
- Directed by: Alain Berbérian
- Written by: Alain Chabat; Dominique Farrugia; Chantal Lauby
- Produced by: Charles Gassot
- Starring: Chantal Lauby; Alain Chabat; Dominique Farrugia; Gérard Darmon
- Cinematography: Laurent Dailland
- Edited by: Véronique Parnet
- Music by: Philippe Chany
- Production companies: M6 Films; Telema (Film Company); Le Studio Canal+ France 3 Cinéma
- Distributed by: AMLF
- Release date: 9 March 1994 (France)
- Running time: 93 minutes
- Country: France
- Languages: French; English
- Budget: $7.5 million
- Box office: $13.2 million

La Cité de la peur (transl. "The City of Fear"), also known as Le film de Les Nuls ("The Les Nuls Movie"), is a 1994 French comedy film written by and starring Chantal Lauby, Alain Chabat and Dominique Farrugia of the comedy group Les Nuls, and directed by Alain Berbérian in 1994.

The movie parodies big budget American films (Basic Instinct, Pretty Woman and The Terminator, among others, are directly spoofed) and relies heavily on puns and word play, which makes it somewhat inaccessible for non native French speakers.

== Synopsis ==
Odile Deray (Chantal Lauby) is a struggling film directior following the negative reputation of her latest slasher film, Red is Dead. Soon after, the film's projectionist is murder in a similar manner than in the movie, and the killer leaves the letter "O" as a hint. Odile learns that the murder may give publicity to the movie, and decides to bring the movie's main actor, Simon (Dominique Farrugia), to the Cannes Film Festival with a bodyguard. Odil hires Serge Karamazov (Alain Chabat). Soon after arriving to Cannes, a second projectionist is murdered, with the letter "D" as another hint.

Comissaire Bialès (Gérard Darmon) is sent to investigate the murder, and interrogates Odile in a parody of Basic Instinct, and the pair quickly becomes infatuated. The next day, Karamazov encounters the murderer as it kills the third projectionist, leaving the letter "I" as a hint. Karamazov fails to catch the killer. He and Simon later spend the night at a night club while Odile and Bialès confess their feelings and consume their love. However, she finds an hammer and a scythe -- the murderer's weapons -- and believes Bialès is the murderer. The next day, she hires Émile (Sam Karmann), the actual murderer, as the new projectionist, which Karamazov is hired to protect him for the festival.

It is revealed that Émile's motive stands from many years ago where he attempted to begin a relationship with Oldie, only to be pushed away every time. Arriving at the ceremony, Émile loses consciousness at the presence of Jean-Paul Martoni, leading Karamazov and Bialès to do a musical while Simon becomes projectionist thanks to past experience. Émile regains consciousness and attacks Simon, but is caught in a giant mouse trap placed by Karamazov. Odile and Bialès arrive, where they reconcile through an inelligible coversation. As Martoni arrives and holds Odile at gunpoint, Émile, having survived, knocks Martoni out and attempts to reveal his motive to Odile, only to being shot dead by Martoni; as he dies, Odile interrupts him for his bad breath, leaving him unable to reveal his motive. Martoni is arrested, and Karamazov, Simon, and Odile reunite outside. Oblivious to the hints -- O-D-I-L (Odile) -- the trio decides to ignore it and go to eat.

== Cast ==
- Alain Chabat as Serge Karamazov, Yuri, and a journalist
- Dominique Farrugia as Simon Jérémi (a.k.a. Ben, in Red is Dead)
- Chantal Lauby as Odile Deray
- Gérard Darmon as Patrick Bialès (and his parents, Maurice Bialès and Alicia Lampéro)
- Sam Karmann as Émile Gravier
- Patrick Lizana as Grimaldi
- Jean-Christophe Bouvet as Jean-Paul Martoni
- Éric Prat as Garcia
- Artus de Penguern as Sens
- Marc de Jonge as Le patron de Karamazov
- Hélène de Fougerolles as Sandy Brookshield (a.k.a. Sandy, in Red is Dead)
- Valérie Lemercier as the widow of the first projectionist
- Tchéky Karyo as the first projectionist
- Daniel Gélin as the second projectionist
- Jean-Pierre Bacri as the third projectionist
- Eddy Mitchell as the fourth projectionist
- Dominique Besnehard as the journalist
- Sophie Mounicot as the journalist

A number of celebrities make cameo appearances as themselves, including Rosanna Arquette, Dave, Pierre Lescure, Daniel Toscan du Plantier and Patrice Laffont.

== Reception ==
The film was number one at the French box office for two weeks.

Some lines from the film have become cult in France and have been reused in various media.
