= Didier (film) =

- Directed by: Alain Chabat
- Written by: Alain Chabat
- Produced by: Claude Berri
- Starring: Jean-Pierre Bacri; Alain Chabat
- Cinematography: Laurent Dailland
- Edited by: Roland Baubeau
- Music by: Philippe Chany; Raggasonic
- Distributed by: AMLF
- Release date: 29 January 1997
- Running time: 107 minutes
- Country: France
- Language: French
- Budget: $8.8 million
- Box office: $21.8 million

Didier is a 1997 French comedy film written and directed by Alain Chabat. It stars Jean-Pierre Bacri and Alain Chabat. Chabat received a César Award for Best Debut in 1998.

== Plot ==
Jean-Pierre, a football agent, has agreed to keep Didier, his sister's dog - film journalist Annabelle. During the night, the Labrador is transformed into a human, at least in appearance, but Didier is still a dog psychologically. Confronted by Richard, the boss of the football club that hires him, Jean-Pierre did not need another problem in addition to the ones from his famous football players, Fabrice and Baco, both injured only one week before a very important match against the Paris Saint-Germain. Didier is going to help him and replace the injured players. But the real mission of Didier is to reconcile Jean-Pierre and his girlfriend Maria.

== Cast ==
- Jean-Pierre Bacri as Jean-Pierre Costa
- Alain Chabat as Didier / Didje Hazanavicius, the dog transformed into a human
- Elliot as Didier the golden labrador
- Isabelle Gélinas as Maria
- Lionel Abelanski as Charlie Abitbol
- Michel Bompoil as Coco
- Jean-Marie Frin as Richard Guerra
- Chantal Lauby as Solange
- Zinedine Soualem as Camel Mimouni
- Jacques Vincey as Adolf, chief of the skinheads
- Caroline Cellier as Annabelle
- Josiane Balasko as Mrs. Massart, the podiatrist-hypnotist
- Dominique Farrugia as a supporter of the Paris Saint-Germain
- Dieudonné as Jean, a sports commentator
- Serge Hazanavicius as Fabrice, a soccer player
- Jean Seaille as Bruno Miriel
- Isabelle Alexis as Barbara
- Marie-Charlotte Dutot as Camille

== Reception ==
The film opened at number one at the French box office with a gross of 21.7 million French Franc ($4 million). It was number one for a second week and went on to gross $21.8 million.

== See also ==
- List of association football films
- The Shaggy Dog (1959), a Walt Disney film where a young boy is transformed into a dog
- The Shaggy D.A. (1976), the sequel of the previous film
- The Shaggy Dog (2006), a modern remake of 1959 film The Shaggy Dog
