= May Fools =

1990 French film directed by Louis Malle

- Directed by: Louis Malle
- Written by: Jean-Claude Carrière; Louis Malle
- Produced by: Louis Malle; Vincent Malle
- Starring: Michel Piccoli; Miou-Miou; Michel Duchaussoy; Dominique Blanc; Harriet Walter; Bruno Carette; Paulette Dubost
- Cinematography: Renato Berta
- Edited by: Emmanuelle Castro
- Music by: Stéphane Grappelli
- Production companies: Ellepi Film; Franco London Films; Nouvelles Editions de Films; TF1 Films
- Distributed by: Pyramide Distribution
- Release date: 24 January 1990 (France)
- Running time: 107 minutes
- Countries: France; Italy
- Language: French

Milou en mai, released as Milou in May in the UK and as May Fools in North America, is a 1990 French film directed by Louis Malle. Set against the backdrop of May 1968, the film depicts a clash within a provincial bourgeois family over the division of an inheritance, centring on the body of a deceased woman they cannot manage to bury. It serves as a highly ironic and biting allegory for the events of 1968—featuring protests, attempts at sexual liberation, a failed marriage, and greed, as the family grapples with who will inherit what and whether the family home (representing the nation) can be saved. The film combines elements of social and interpersonal commentary with farce.

== Synopsis ==
The elderly matriarch of the Vieuzac family dies suddenly at her country estate in southwestern France. Her sixty-year-old son, Milou, has spent his entire life living with his mother and enjoys an idyllic, work-free existence devoted to nature, poetry, and simple pleasures. Her death brings together an assortment of relatives, including Milou's pragmatic brother Georges, his English wife Lily, Milou's daughter Camille, his niece Claire, and several grandchildren, lovers, and family friends.

Almost immediately, old rivalries and hidden resentments surface as the family turns its attention to the inheritance. While Milou desperately wants to preserve the ancestral home, most of the others view the estate primarily as a financial asset and argue that it should be sold. The reading of the will further inflames tensions when the loyal housekeeper Adèle unexpectedly receives a quarter of the inheritance. Meanwhile, Camille secretly claims an emerald ring that others covet, adding another source of suspicion and intrigue.

Outside the estate, France is descending into chaos during 1968 national unrest. Student demonstrations, nationwide strikes, fuel shortages, and transportation shutdowns make it impossible to arrange the funeral. With no priest available and no practical way to bury the deceased, the family is forced to remain together in the house with the coffin for an indefinite period. News of the national crisis filters in through Georges's radio broadcasts, while a cheerful lorry driver stranded by the strikes arrives with Pierre-Alain, a young relative inspired by the revolutionary spirit of Paris.

== Cast ==
- Miou-Miou as Camille, Milou's daughter
- Michel Piccoli as Milou
- Michel Duchaussoy as Georges, Milou's brother
- Bruno Carette as Grimaldi the lorry driver
- François Berléand as Daniel, the lawyer and Camille's childhood friend
- Dominique Blanc as Claire, Milou's niece
- Valérie Lemercier as Madame Boutelleau
- Paulette Dubost as Mrs. Vieuzac, Milou's mother
- Harriet Walter as Lily, Georges's wife and Milou's sister-in-law
- Martine Gautier as Adèle, the servant and Milou's lover
- Rozenne Le Tallec as Marie-Laure, Claire's, and later Pierre-Alain's, lover
- Jeanne Herry as Françoise, daughter of Camille and (as Jeanne Herry-Leclerc)
- Renaud Danner as Pierre-Alain

== Production ==
Filming took place from 25 May to 18 August 1989. The location used was the Château du Calaoué in the Gers département, southwestern France.

This marked Valérie Lemercier's film debut; she played the role of Madame Boutelleau.

Stéphane Paoli provided the voice for the Europe 1 radio broadcast, playing the journalist Jacques Paoli, his own father.

The role of young Françoise, Camille's daughter, was played by Miou-Miou's own daughter (with singer Julien Clerc), Jeanne Herry.

This was the final film appearance for Bruno Carette, who died a few months later from fulminant leukoencephalitis.

== Awards ==
- Best Foreign Direction, David di Donatello Awards 1990.
- Nomination for Best Foreign Film, BAFTA Awards 1991.
- César Award for Best supporting Actress: Dominique Blanc. Nominations for Césars for Best Actor: Michel Piccoli, Best Actress: Miou-Miou, and Best Supporting Actor: Michel Duchaussoy. 1991.
