= Dominique Farrugia =

French actor

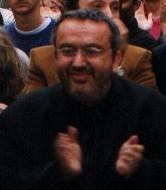
- Dominique Farrugia in 1999
- Born: Dominique Spiridion Léon Farrugia; 2 September 1962 (age 63); Vichy, France
- Occupations: Actor, film director, screenwriter, producer, humorist, comedian
- Years active: 1985–present

Dominique Farrugia (born 2 September 1962) is a French actor, film director, screenwriter, producer, humorist and comedian. He is a member and founder of the comedy troupe Les Nuls alongside Alain Chabat, Chantal Lauby and Bruno Carette.

== Life and career ==
Farrugia was born in Vichy, France, to a Jewish pied-noir and Maltese family.

Since the launching of Canal+, in 1984, he works in editing trailers and as a broadcast production assistant on the Tous en scène show. Thus he meets Canal+ first weatherman, Alain Chabat, with whom he would form the group of comedians Les Nuls alongside Chantal Lauby and Bruno Carette in 1986. In 1987 he is included in the writing of the TV series Objective: nul (7 d'Or for best comedy TV show), the first parody by Les Nuls. He hosts a parodic weather forecast in the 'JTN' of 'Nulle part ailleurs' from 1987 to 1988. Initially, he did not want to act, but rather write. The absence of one of the actors in an episode of Objective: nul accidentally placed him in front of the camera. TVN 595, a TV special which was broadcast in October 1988, won the 7 d'Or for best show. Les Nuls' career lasts until 1992.

In 1994, La Cité de la peur is released making 3,216,436 entries in the French box office.

After Les Nuls split, Dominique Farrugia starts a film career as a director with Delphine 1, Yvan 0 and Trafic d'influence. He subsequently becomes a producer founding the RF2K production company with the actor Olivier Granier.

In 1997 he founded the cable and satellite TV channel Comédie !, discovering new comic talents such as Les Robins des Bois, Franck Dubosc, Titoff, Kad & Olivier and Jonathan Lambert.

In April 2001, he created the cable and satellite TV channel Cuisine TV.

In 2001-2002, he produces Vidocq (1,865,998 entries in France) and Monsieur Batignole (1,872,045 entries in France).

In 2002, he first becomes director-general and deputy director of broadcasting and programming at Canal+ and later president from April 2002 to February 2003 and to date, only assistant becoming president of Canal+.

In July 2003, he created FEW (Farrudg Entertainment Worldwide), a media company producing feature films.

In 2007 he produced the show of Manu Payet, then two years later of Laurent Lafitte.

In 2009, he launched the website Les graves infos which presents false news. The site is closed on 23 February 2010.

In 2010, he co-directed with Arnaud Lemort the film L'amour c'est mieux à deux (1,250,000 entries in France, more profitable movie of 2010, with its particular stage of Clovis Cornillac, Virginia Efira and Manu Payet).

Between September 2010 and May 2011, he is a columnist in the show Tout le monde il est beau, tout le monde il est gentil, hosted by Bruce Toussaint, every Sunday on Canal+.

On 20 November 2012, FEW, his production company and Luc Besson's EuropaCorp, signed an agreement under which all FEW films will be produced exclusively in partnership with EuropaCorp.

== Filmography ==
=== As actor ===
Year	Title	Role	Director	Notes
1987	Objectif Nul	Space Pirate	Various	TV series (1 episode)
1990	Histoire(s) de la télévision	Gilles Gilet	Alain Berbérian; Alexis Bouriquet	TV series
1991	The Professional Secrets of Dr. Apfelgluck	Seller		
1993	La Classe américaine	Huggy's Friend (voice)	Michel Hazanavicius; Dominique Mézerette	TV movie
1994	La Cité de la peur	Simon Jérémi	Alain Berbérian	
1995	Le futur		Dominique Farrugia	Short
1996	Delphine 1, Yvan 0	Serge	Dominique Farrugia	
1997	Didier	Gilles	Alain Chabat	
1998	Le clone	Receptionist	Fabio Conversi	
1998	Let There Be Light	Taxi Driver	Arthur Joffé	
1999	Trafic d'influence	Funeral Home Employee	Dominique Farrugia	
2000	Elie annonce Semoun	Various	Élie Semoun	
2000	La cape et l'épée	Minstrel Narrator	Jean-Jacques Amsellem	TV series (2 episodes)
2000	How The Grinch Stole Christmas	Narrator	Ron Howard	French dub
2001	Gregoire Moulin vs. Humanity	Sport Reporter	Artus de Penguern	
2001	La stratégie de l'échec	Host	Dominique Farrugia	
2003	Laisse tes mains sur mes hanches	VIP Womanizer	Chantal Lauby	
2003	The Car Keys	Himself	Laurent Baffie	
2004	RRRrrrr!!!	Cudgel Maker	Alain Chabat	
2004	Casablanca Driver	Walter Goudon	Maurice Barthélemy	
2010	L'amour, c'est mieux à deux	Client	Dominique Farrugia; Arnaud Lemort	
2013	Y'a pas d'âge	Record Label's Boss	July Hygreck	TV series (1 episode)

=== As producer ===
Year	Title	Director	Notes
1994	10 ans de censure	Alain Berbérian	TV movie
1996	Delphine 1, Yvan 0	Dominique Farrugia	
1997	Echec au capital	Michel Hazanavicius	Short
1998	Paparazzi	Alain Berbérian	
1998	Le clone	Fabio Conversi	
1999	Mes amis	Michel Hazanavicius	
2000	Most Promising Young Actress	Gérard Jugnot	
2001	Vidocq	Pitof	
2002	Monsieur Batignole	Gérard Jugnot	
2003	Samedi soir en direct		TV show
2008	Mes amis, mes amours	Lorraine Lévy	
2009	R.T.T.	Frédéric Berthe	
2010	L'amour, c'est mieux à deux	Dominique Farrugia; Arnaud Lemort	
2011	Le marquis	Dominique Farrugia	
2012	Il était une fois, une fois	Christian Merret-Palmair	
2012	Dépression et des potes	Arnaud Lemort	
2014	Never On The First Night	Melissa Drigeard	
2015	Bis	Himself	
2016	Encore heureux	Benoît Graffin	
2017	Sous le même toit	Himself	

=== As director ===
Year	Title	Notes
1995	Le futur	Short
1996	Delphine 1, Yvan 0	
1999	Trafic d'influence	
2001	La stratégie de l'échec	
2003	Samedi soir en direct	TV show
2010	L'amour, c'est mieux à deux	
2011	Le marquis	
2015	Bis	
2017	Sous le même toit	
