= The Professional Secrets of Dr. Apfelgluck =

- Directed by: Alessandro Capone; Stéphane Clavier; Thierry Lhermitte; Mathias Ledoux; Hervé Palud
- Written by: Philippe Bruneau; Thierry Lhermitte
- Produced by: Louis Becker; Claudio Bonivento; Alain Clert; Thierry Lhermitte; Giuseppe Pedersoli
- Starring: Thierry Lhermitte; Jacques Villeret; Véronique Genest; Alain Chabat; Dominique Lavanant; Roland Giraud; Zabou Breitman; Daniel Gélin; Valérie Mairesse; Gérard Jugnot; Jean Yanne
- Cinematography: Claude Agostini; Roberto Girometti; Gérard Sterin; Jean-Jacques Tarbès
- Edited by: Sophie Schmit
- Production companies: Ice Films; Films A2
- Distributed by: AMLF
- Release date: 24 April 1991
- Running time: 95 minutes
- Country: France
- Language: French
- Box office: $3.7 million

The Professional Secrets of Dr. Apfelgluck or Les secrets professionnels du Dr Apfelglück is a 1991 French comedy film directed by Alessandro Capone, Stéphane Clavier, Thierry Lhermitte, Mathias Ledoux and Hervé Palud.

== Plot ==
Dr. Apfelglück, a prominent psychiatrist, recounts some of the more serious cases that came to him.

== Cast ==
- Thierry Lhermitte as Doctor Apfelglück
- Jacques Villeret as Martineau
- Alessandro Haber as Jean-Luc
- Véronique Genest as Micheline
- Ennio Fantastichini as Alain
- Alain Chabat as Gérard Martinez
- Dominique Lavanant as Jacqueline Vidart
- Roland Giraud as Émile Leberck
- Zabou Breitman as Carole Ribéra
- Daniel Gélin as Roland Grumaud
- Renato Scarpa as Michel Martinelli
- Pascal Sevran as Alain Laurent
- Valérie Mairesse as Astrée
- Gérard Jugnot as Martini
- Jean Yanne as Germain
- Luis Rego as Monsieur Gomez
- Laurent Gamelon as Maurice
- Laurence Ashley as Anne Métayer
  - Louba Guertchikoff as Old Anne Métayer
- Micha Bayard as Mother Tonnerre
- Philippe Bruneau as Jean-Paul Tarade
- Doudou Babet as Georges Bellerive
- Jacqueline Rouillard as Madame Garaud
- Carole Jacquinot as Marinette
  - Ginette Garcin as Old Marinette
- Josiane Balasko as The scientist
- Christian Clavier as The lawyer
- Michel Blanc as The Hindu
- Charlotte de Turckheim as The Spanish
- Martin Lamotte as The Spanish
- Alexandra Vandernoot as The Belgian
- Francis Lemaire as The Belgian
- Ticky Holgado as The hotelier
- Claire Nadeau as The hotelier
- Jean-Marie Bigard as The Café owner
- Bruno Moynot as The consumer's bistro
- Dominique Farrugia as The sellor
- Mouss Diouf as The nurse
