= Manu Payet =

French comedian, actor, filmmaker and radio host

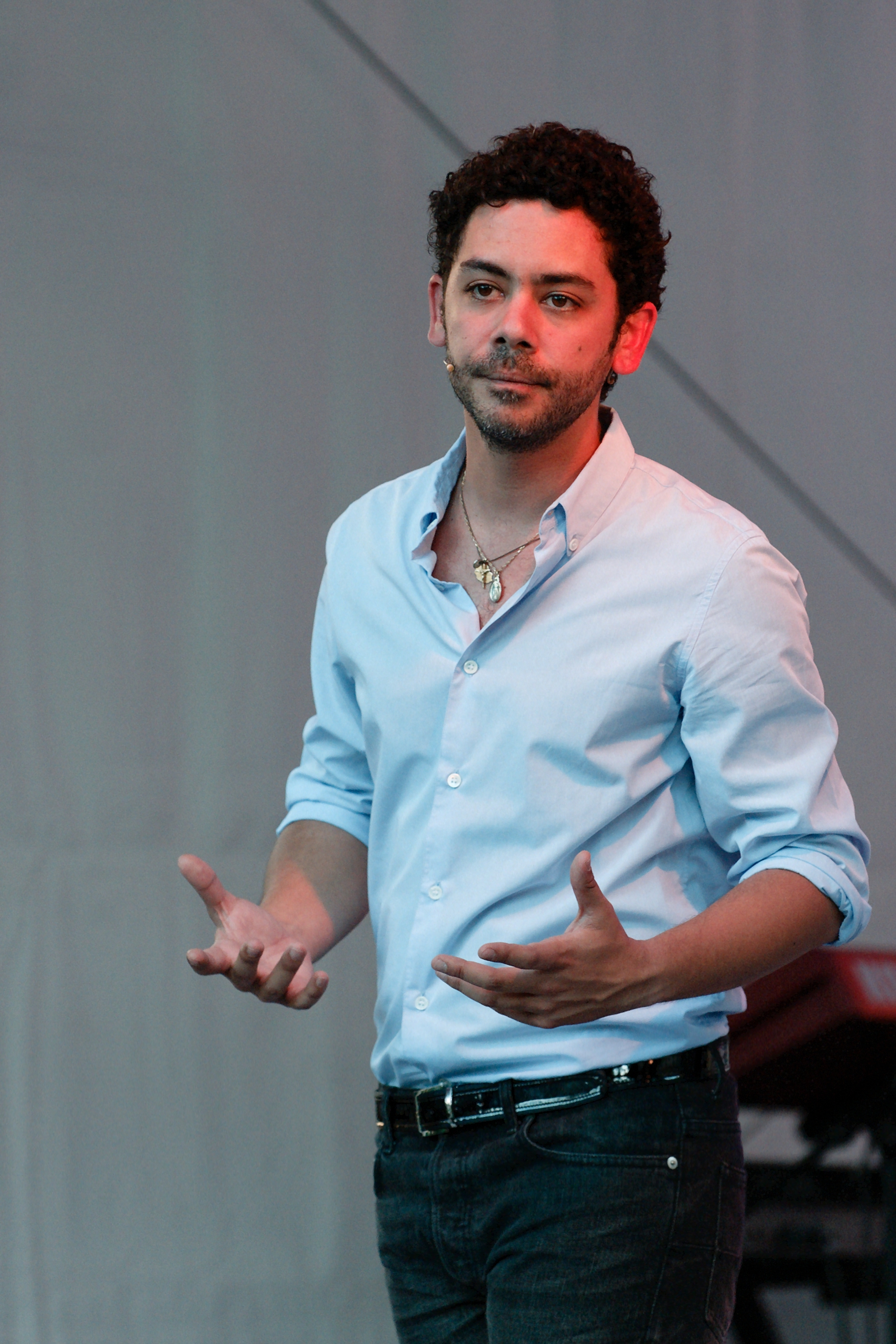
- Manu Payet at the Fête de la Musique (Paris)
- Born: Emmanuel Xavier Payet; 22 December 1975 (age 50); Saint-Denis, Réunion, France
- Occupations: Actor, comedian, radio presenter, TV presenter, film director, screenwriter
- Years active: 2000–present
- Spouse: Géraldine Nakache (m. 2009; div. 2011)

Emmanuel "Manu" Payet (French pronunciation: [emanɥɛl many pajɛt]; born 22 December 1975) is a French comedian, actor, filmmaker and radio host.

== Filmography ==
=== As actor ===
Year	Title	Role	Director	Notes
2006	Hey Good Looking !	The Man at the synagogue	Lisa Azuelos	
2008	Hello Goodbye	Shapiro	Graham Guit	
2008	Kung Fu Panda	Po (voice)	John Stevenson and Mark Osborne	French dub
2009	Coco	Steve	Gad Elmaleh	
2009	Kaamelott	Verinus	Alexandre Astier	TV series (7 episodes)
2010	Tout ce qui brille	Éric, Lila's fiancé	Géraldine Nakache and Hervé Mimran	
2011	The Day I Saw Your Heart			
2011	Kung Fu Panda 2	Po (voice)	Jennifer Yuh Nelson	French dub
2012	The Players	Simon		
2012	Radiostars	Alex		
2014	Relationship Status: It’s Complicated	Ben	Manu Payet et Rodolphe Lauga	
2015	Blind Date	The Picard cashier	Clovis Cornillac	
2015	Dad in Training	Antoine	Cyril Gelblat	Cabourg Film Festival - Best Actor
2015	Les Gorilles	Walter	Tristan Aurouet	
2016	Kung Fu Panda 3	Po (voice)	Jennifer Yuh Nelson and Alessandro Carloni	French dub
2017	Gangsterdam	Mischka	Romain Lévy	
2017	Sous le même toit		Dominique Farrugia	
2018	Budapest	Vincent		
2020	Selfie		Cyril Gelblat	

== Voice work ==
=== Animated films ===
- 2006: Ice Age: The Meltdown: French voice of Lone Gunslinger Vulture
- 2008: Kung Fu Panda: French voice of Po
- 2011: Kung Fu Panda 2: French voice of Po
- 2013: Boule & Bill: French voice of Po
