= Sous le même toit =

- Film poster
- Directed by: Dominique Farrugia
- Screenplay by: Dominique Farrugia; Laurent Turner
- Produced by: Dominique Farrugia
- Starring: Louise Bourgoin; Gilles Lellouche
- Cinematography: Rémy Chevrin
- Production company: EuropaCorp
- Distributed by: EuropaCorp. Distribution
- Release dates: 19 January 2017 (L'Alpe d'Huez); 19 April 2017 (France)
- Country: France
- Language: French
- Budget: $11 million
- Box office: $4.8 million

Sous le même toit (French pronunciation: [su lə mɛm twa]; transl. Under the Same Roof) is a 2017 French comedy film directed by Dominique Farrugia.

== Plot ==
It tells the story of a divorced couple whose husband does not find an apartment. He will finally see his former wife, saying "I have 20% of the apartment so you redeem it, or I just live in my 20%".

== Cast ==
- Louise Bourgoin as Delphine Parisot
- Gilles Lellouche as Yvan Hazan
- Adèle Castillon as Violette Hazan
- Kolia Abiteboul as Lucas Hazan
- Marilou Berry as Mélissa
- Manu Payet as Nico
- Julien Boisselier as William
- Marie-Anne Chazel as Solange
- Nicole Calfan as Delphine's mother
- Katia Tchenko as Chantal
- Lionel Abelanski as Copain Yvan 4
- Dominique Farrugia as Copain Yvan 1
- Claire-Lise Lecerf as Aurore
