= Alain Chabat =

French actor and director (born 1958)

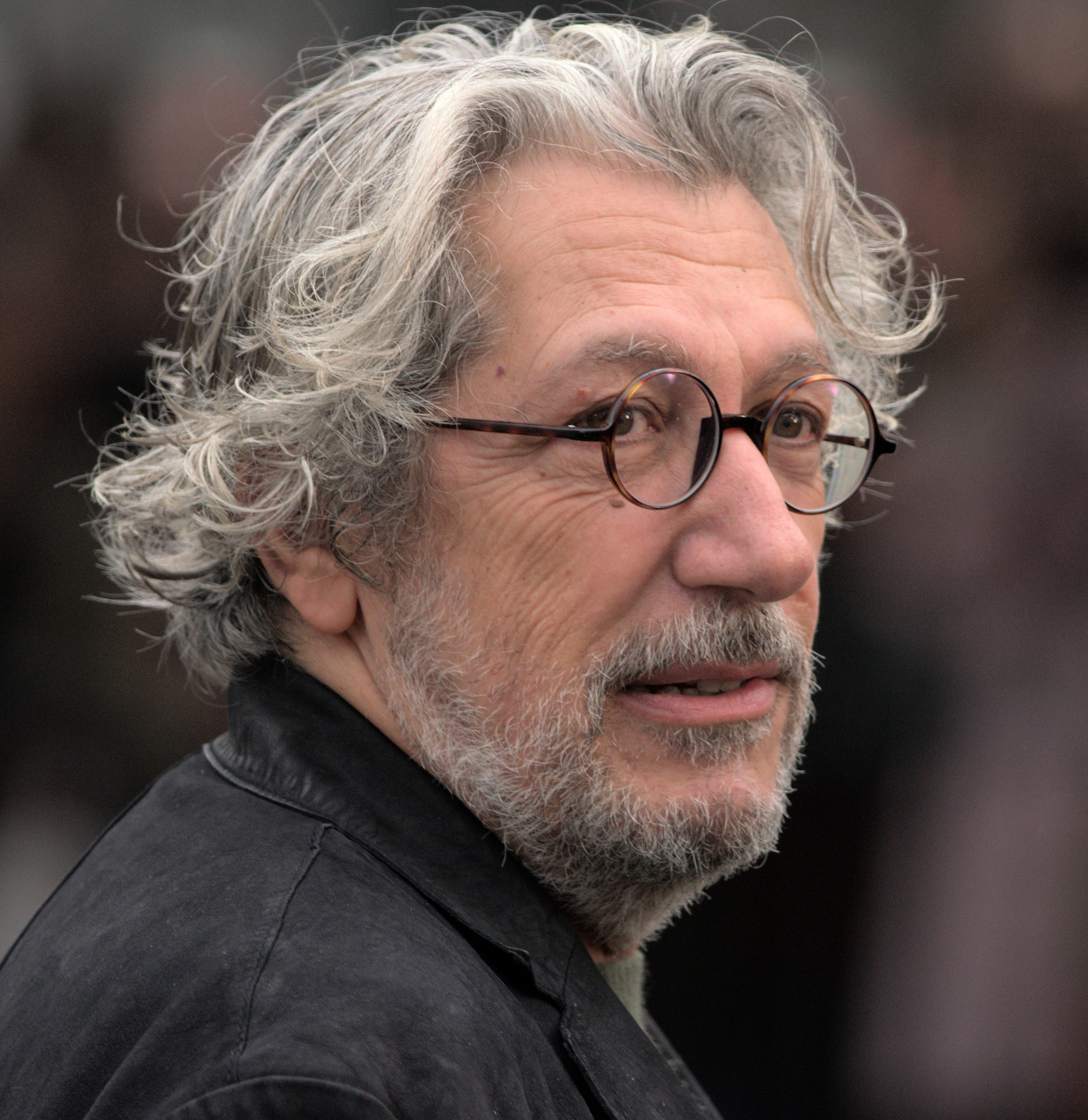
- Chabat in 2019
- Born: Alain Yves Stéphane Chabat; 24 November 1958 (age 67); Oran, Algeria
- Occupations: Actor, comedian, director, screenwriter, producer, television presenter
- Years active: 1987–present

Alain Yves Stéphane Chabat (French pronunciation: [alɛ̃ ʃaba]; born 24 November 1958) is a French actor, comedian, director, screenwriter, producer and television host. Originally known for his work with the comedy group Les Nuls, including as a co-writer and the lead actor of La Cité de la peur (1994), he later co-created and hosted the Burger Quiz game show, which became the most watched entertainment show in the history of French television.

Chabat has also become a notable filmmaker of his own, typically both writing and starring in the movies he directed, which include comedy films such as Asterix & Obelix: Mission Cleopatra (2002), RRRrrrr!!! (2004) and Houba! On the Trail of the Marsupilami (2012). He appeared in French Twist (1995), The Taste of Others (2000), Happily Ever After (2004), The Science of Sleep (2006), as well as briefly in the television series Kaamelott (2005). Additionally, he voiced the title character in the French dubbing of the Shrek franchise.

== Early life ==
Chabat was born in Oran, French Algeria. He is Jewish.

== Career ==
His media career began in 1987 when he founded the comedy group "Les Nuls" (The Lame-os) with Bruno Carette, Chantal Lauby and Dominique Farrugia. Les Nuls' first appearance on French television, on the subscriber channel Canal Plus, was a sci-fi spoof entitled Objectif Nul (a word play with Objectif Lune, the French title of the comic album Destination Moon, one of The Adventures of Tintin). The show shares striking similarities with the British TV series Red Dwarf, although both shows were released at roughly the same time and it is unlikely one influenced the other.

Both as a member of Les Nuls (in La Cité de la Peur) and in his solo efforts (including Asterix & Obelix: Mission Cleopatra, in which he both directed and acted), Chabat has been described as emulating the heavily referential, pop-culture-based writing style of the Zucker, Abrahams and Zucker trio and adapting it to the tastes of the French audience.

Chabat also voiced the title character in the French dubs of all four Shrek films, replacing Mike Myers. He won the César Award for Best Debut in 1998 for Didier.

He co-starred in Happily Ever After (2004) and in Prête-moi ta main (2006) (which he also wrote) alongside Charlotte Gainsbourg. He played Napoleon Bonaparte in the 2009 film Night at the Museum: Battle of the Smithsonian.

In November 2022, Chabat hosted Le Late avec Alain Chabat on TF1 which ran for 10 episodes during the 2022 FIFA World Cup.

From 2021, Chabat developed for Netflix an animated miniseries based on the Asterix franchise: Asterix and Obelix: The Big Fight, adapted from the 1964 comic book story, started streaming on 30 April 2025.

== Filmography ==
=== Film ===
Year	Title	Role	Notes
1990	Baby Blood	Slain Passerby	
1991	The Professional Secrets of Dr. Apfelgluck	Gérard Martinez	
1992	Pizza blob	Professor Liégeois	Short
1994	La Cité de la peur	Serge Karamazov / Youri / Jacques	Also co-writer
1994	Parano	Pilot	
1994	6 Days, 6 Nights	Thomas	
1994	One Night of Hypocrisy	Thomas	Short
1995	French Twist	Laurent Lafaye	Nominated - César Award for Best Actor
1996	Beaumarchais	Courtier	
1996	Delphine 1, Yvan 0	Pierre Krief	
1997	Didier	Didier / Didje Hazanavicius	Also director and writer César Award for Best Debut; Nominated - César Award for Best Actor
1997	Le cousin	Gérard Delvaux	
1998	Quest for Camelot	Devon / Cornwall (voice)	French dub
1999	Trafic d'influence	Priest	
1999	Mes amis	Etienne	
1999	La débandade	Specialist	
1999	Bricol' Girls	Narrator/White Rasta	Direct-to-video
2000	The Taste of Others	Bruno Deschamps	Nominated - César Award for Best Supporting Actor; Nominated - Chlotrudis Award - Best Cast
2000	Kitchendales	Enzo's Mother	Direct-to-video
2001	L'art (délicat) de la séduction	Master Zen	
2001	Shrek	Shrek (voice)	French dub
2002	Asterix & Obelix: Mission Cleopatra	Julius Caesar	Also director, writer and co-producer Nominated - European Film Award - Best Actor
2003	Chouchou	Stanislas de la Tour-Maubourg	
2003	Laisse tes mains sur mes hanches	Bernard	
2003	Mais qui a tué Pamela Rose ?	Peter Mc Gray	
2003	The Car Keys	Dog Seller	
2004	RRRrrrr!!!	Pierre the Medicine Man	Also director, writer and co-producer
2004	Casablanca Driver	Doctor Brenson	
2004	Happily Ever After	Georges	
2004	Shrek 2	Shrek (voice)	French dub
2005	Papa	Papa	
2006	The Science of Sleep	Guy	
2006	I Do	Luis Costa	Also co-writer and producer Nominated - César Award for Best Actor
2007	Garage Babes	Narrator/The Cacou	Direct-to-video
2007	Shrek the Third	Shrek (voice)	French dub
2008	15 ans et demi	Norbert	
2008	Me Two	Gilles Gabriel	Also producer
2008	Un monde à nous	English Teacher	Also producer
2009	Night at the Museum: Battle of the Smithsonian	Napoleon Bonaparte	Also French dub
2009	Trésor	Jean-Pierre	
2009	Le siffleur	Tax Auditor	
2010	Shrek Forever After	Shrek (voice)	French dub
2011	War of the Buttons	Monsieur Labru	
2011	Scrat's Continental Crack-Up: Part 2	Silas (voice)	Short film, English and French dub
2012	A Thousand Words	Christian Léger de la Touffe	Also producer Also French dub
2012	Houba! On the Trail of the Marsupilami	Dan Geraldo	Also director, writer and producer
2012	Ice Age: Continental Drift	Silas (voice)	English and French dub
2013	Turf	Nicos Fivos	Also producer
2013	Les gamins	Gilbert	
2013	Mood Indigo	Jules Gouffé	
2014	Reality	Jason Tantra	
2014	Asterix: The Mansions of the Gods	Senator Prospectus (voice)	
2017	Valerian and the City of a Thousand Planets	Bob the Pirate	
2017	Santa & Cie	Santa	Also director, writer and producer
2018	Keep an Eye Out!	Screams of pain (voice)	Cameo
2019	Play	Max's father	
2019	#Jesuislà	Stéphane	
2021	Kaamelott: The First Chapter	The Duke of Aquitaine	
2022	Little Nicholas: Happy As Can Be	René Goscinny (voice)	
2022	Incredible but True	Alain	
2022	Smoking Causes Coughing	Chief Didier (voice)	
2024	Beating Hearts	Jackie's father	César Award for Best Supporting Actor
2025	Kaamelott: The Second Chapter Part 1	The Duke of Aquitaine	
2026	Le Vertige	Jacques (voice)	
2026	Evil Dead Burn	Alice's dad (voice)	
2027	Shrek 5	Shrek (voice)	French dub
2027	High in the Clouds	Bigsby (voice)	

Key
†	Denotes films not yet released

=== Television ===
Year	Title	Role	Notes
1987	Objectif: Nul	Capitain Lamar/Various characters	TV series (all episodes)
1988	TVN 595	Various characters	TV special
1989	Palace	Cédric	TV series (1 Episode)
1990	Histoire(s) de la télévision	Roland Gilet	TV series (all episodes)
1990-1992	Les Nuls, L'Emission	Himself/Various characters	TV series (56 episodes)
1993	La Classe américaine	Deep Throat (voice)	TV Movie
1998	Ivre mort pour la patrie	German General	TV Short
2001	La cape et l'épée	Minstrel	TV series (2 Episodes)
2001–2002 2018–present	Burger Quiz	Himself (host)	Broadcast: Canal + (2001–2002) / TMC (2018–present); Also co-creator and co-writer
2006	Avez-vous déjà vu..?	Narrator/Various voices	TV series (all episodes)
2007	Kaamelott	The Duke of Aquitaine	TV series (4 Episodes)
2007	Shrek the Halls	Shrek (voice)	TV special, French dub
2007	Elie Annonce Semoun	Sylvain Mérichu	Miniseries; Direct-to-video
2008	Rien dans les poches	Rita	Also producer TV Movie
2010	Scared Shrekless	Shrek (voice)	TV special, French dub
2011	Le grand restaurant II	Alain	TV movie
2022	Le Late avec Alain Chabat	Himself (host)	TV series
2024	Represent	François Colignon	TV series
2025	Asterix and Obelix: The Big Fight	Asterix/Geriatrix/Twinpix (voice)	Netflix mini-series
