= Les Nuls =

Les Nuls (also known as ABCD Nuls) was a French comedy troupe appearing between 1987 and 1992 on the channel Canal+. The actors Alain Chabat, Dominique Farrugia, Chantal Lauby and Bruno Carette (who died in 1989) played many parodies and humoristic episodes.
