= Alain Berbérian =

French filmmaker

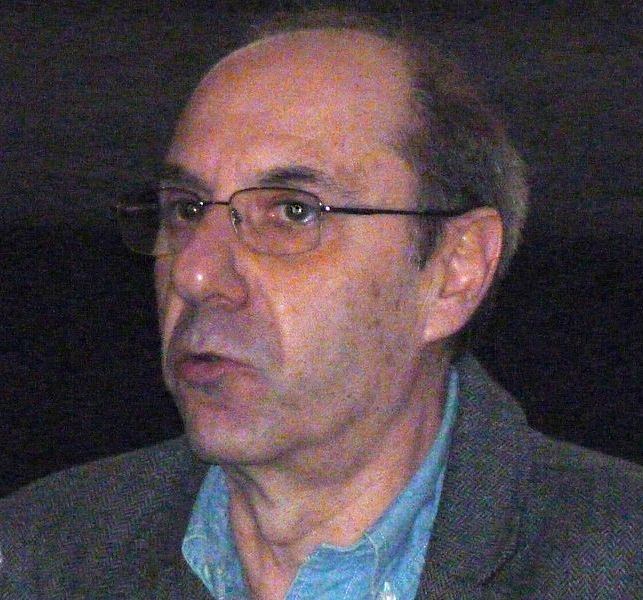
- Berbérian at the 2011 Cannes Film Festival
- Born: 2 July 1953; Beirut, Lebanon
- Died: 22 August 2017 (aged 64); Paris, France
- Occupation(s): Film director, screenwriter

Alain Berbérian (French pronunciation: [alɛ̃ bɛʁbeʁjɑ̃], Armenian: Ալեն Բերբերյան; 2 July 1953 – 22 August 2017) was a French film director and writer of Armenian descent.

== Biography ==
Born in Beirut to an Armenian father and a Greek mother, Berbérian spent his youth in Lebanon before finishing his studies in France. He was the brother of cartoonist Charles Berberian. He began his career in the audiovisual field, working as an editor at Canal+.

His first feature film was the comedy La Cité de la peur, which was hit in France. Based on a script by Les Nuls, the film describes a series of murders in Cannes. Berbérian returned in 1998 with Paparazzi, starring Vincent Lindon and Patrick Timsit. The film follows the life of a night watchman (Timsit) who is fired after being photographed at a soccer game, instead of being at his job. He then meets Michel (Lindon), who teaches him how to be a paparazzo.

In 2000, Berbérian directed Six-Pack, a thriller with Richard Anconina who stalks a serial-killer to the four corners of Paris. Returning in 2002 with the comedy Le Boulet, starring Gérard Lanvin and Benoît Poelvoorde, a prison guard (Poelvoorde) has to team up with a convict (Lanvin) to retrieve a lotto ticket from the latter.

Then in 2004, Berbérian paired Christian Clavier and Jean Reno in the comedy, The Corsican File, based on a comic book of the same name by René Pétillon, in which a detective is responsible for locating a man living in Corsica who is owed an inheritance. In 2007, he reunited Gérard Jugnot and Jean-Paul Rouve in L'Île aux trésors.

== Death ==
Berbérian died in Paris, France, on 22 August 2017, at the age of 64.

== Filmography ==
=== Director ===
- 1989 : ABCD Nuls (TV series), with Les Nuls
- 1990 : Histoire(s) de la télévision (TV series), with Les Nuls
- 1990 : Les Nuls L'émission (TV series), with Les Nuls
- 1994 : La Cité de la peur, with Les Nuls
- 1998 : Paparazzi, with Vincent Lindon
- 2000 : Six-Pack, with Richard Anconina
- 2002 : Le Boulet (Dead Weight), with Gérard Lanvin
- 2004 : L'Enquête Corse (The Corsican File), with Christian Clavier
- 2007 : L'Île aux trésors (Treasured Island), with Gérard Jugnot

=== Writer ===
- 1998 : Six-Pack, with Richard Anconina
- 1997 : Paparazzi, with Vincent Lindon
