= War of the Buttons =

The War of the Buttons or La Guerre des boutons may refer to:

- War of the Buttons (novel), 1912 novel by Louis Pergaud
- La guerre des gosses (1937 film), French film based on the novel
- War of the Buttons (1962 film), French film of the novel
- War of the Buttons (1994 film), English-language film of the novel
- War of the Buttons (2011 Christophe Barratier film), French film based on the novel
- War of the Buttons (2011 Yann Samuell film), French film based on the novel
