= Maréchal, nous voilà! =

1941 French song dedicated to Marshal Philippe Pétain

Maréchal, nous voilà !
English: Marshal, here we are!
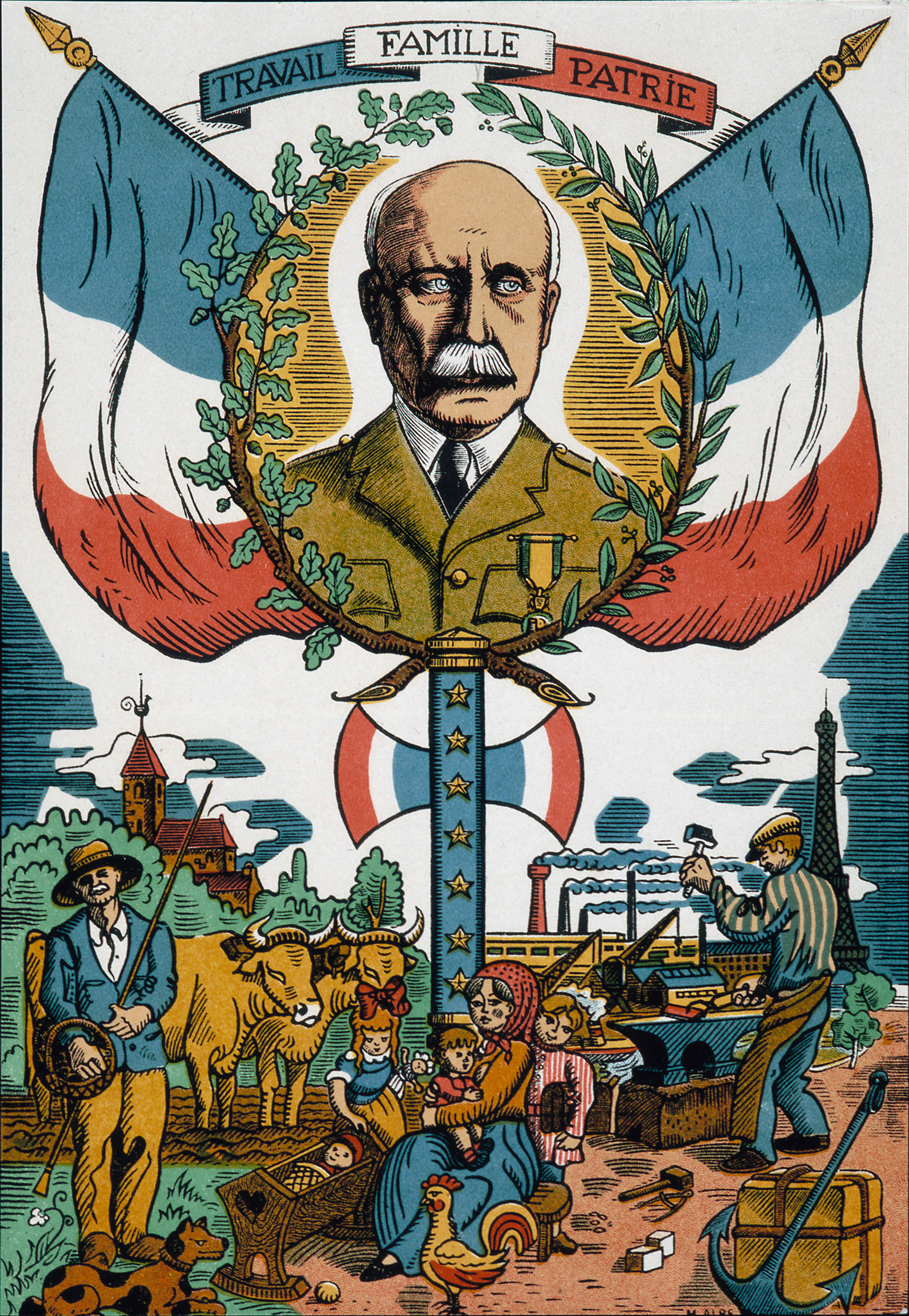
- Unofficial anthem of Vichy France
- Lyrics: André Montagard, 1941
- Music: Kazimierz Oberfeld, 1933
- Adopted: 1941
- Relinquished: 1944
- Preceded by: La Marseillaise
- Succeeded by: La Marseillaise

Audio sample
- Maréchal, nous voilà ! (Vocal version): file; help

Maréchal, nous voilà ! (French pronunciation: [maʁeʃal nu vwala]; "Marshal, here we are!") is a 1941 French song dedicated to Marshal Philippe Pétain. The lyrics were composed by André Montagard; its music was attributed to André Montagard and Charles Courtioux but actually plagiarized from a song composed for the 1933 musical La Margoton du bataillon by Polish Jewish composer Kazimierz Oberfeld, who was deported to Auschwitz in 1945, where he was murdered. Although La Marseillaise remained the official national anthem of the state, Maréchal, nous voilà ! was performed in many capacities unofficially as an alternative song for the public, being used as a popular song for events like sports and recreation. However, the song never dispelled the use of "La Marseillaise" as the official anthem, and it remained the main hymn of the Vichy State and had official support among the Vichy government. It had multiple performances during the Vichy France Era, often in a famous variation by André Dassary.

The refrain itself shows the growing cult of personality around Pétain during the Vichy regime.

== Lyrics ==
Maréchal, nous voilà ! (French)	Marshal, here we are! (English translation)
Une flamme sacrée Monte du sol natal, Et la France enivrée Te salue, Maréchal ! Tous tes enfants qui t’aiment Et vénèrent tes ans, À ton appel suprême Ont répondu: Présent ! Chorus: Maréchal, nous voilà ! Devant toi, le sauveur de la France, Nous jurons, nous tes gars De servir et de suivre tes pas. Maréchal, nous voilà ! Tu nous as redonné l'espérance La patrie renaîtra, Maréchal, Maréchal, Nous voilà ! Tu as lutté sans cesse Pour le salut commun On parle avec tendresse Du héros de Verdun… En nous donnant ta vie, Ton génie et ta foi, Tu sauves la patrie Une seconde fois. Chorus Quand ta voix nous répète Afin de nous unir "Français levons la tête Regardons l'avenir !" Nous, brandissant la toile Du drapeau immortel Dans l'or de tes étoiles Nous voyons luire un ciel Chorus La guerre est inhumaine Quel triste épouvantail! N'écoutons plus la haine Exaltons le travail Et gardons confiance Dans un nouveau destin Car Pétain, c'est la France; La France, c'est Pétain! Chorus	A sacred flame Rises from the native soil, And France enraptured Greets you, Marshal! All your children who love you And worship your years, To your supreme call Have responded: Present! Chorus: Marshal, here we are! Before you, France's saviour, We swear, we your people, To serve and follow your feats. Marshal, here we are! You gave us back hope The Fatherland will be reborn, Marshal, Marshal, Here we are! You fought unceasingly For the common salvation We speak tenderly About Verdun's hero... By giving us your life, Your genius and your faith, You save the homeland A second time. Chorus When your voice repeats to us, to unite us, "Frenchmen, raise your heads, let us look to the future!" We, brandishing the canvas of the immortal flag, in the gold of your stars, see a shining sky Chorus War is inhuman, what a sad specter! Let us no longer listen to hatred, let us exalt work, And keep faith in a new destiny, for Pétain is France, France is Pétain! Chorus

== In popular culture ==
=== Cinema ===
- 2003: The Chorus by Christophe Barratier – Soundtrack.
- 2011: War of the Buttons by Yann Samuell – Soundtrack.
- 2011: War of the Buttons by Christophe Barratier – Soundtrack.
- 2016: Fanny's Journey by Lola Doillon – Soundtrack.

=== Literature ===
- In Pierre Cormon's novel Le Traître, the song plays regularly in a Cairo restaurant in 2002.

=== Comics ===
- Maréchal, nous voilà by Laurent Rullier (script) and Hervé Duphot (drawing and color); volume II of the Les combattants series, Paris, Delcourt, 2012

=== Television ===
- 1991: Les Chansons rétros, filmed sketch by Les Inconnus, parody.

== Bibliography ==
- (in French) Nathalie Dompnier, « Entre La Marseillaise et Maréchal, nous voilà! quel hymne pour le régime de Vichy? », pp. 69–88 , in Myriam Chimènes (dir.), La vie musicale sous Vichy, Éditions Complexe – IRPMF-CNRS, coll. « Histoire du temps présent », 2001, 420 p. ISBN 2-87027-864-0 ISBN 978-2870278642
- Maréchal, nous voilà! mp3 recording (French)
- "Pétain of Verdun, of Vichy, of History". New York Times. 15 November 1964.
- Fancourt, Daisy. "Anthems for France". Music and the Holocaust. ORT.
