= Alexis Michalik =

Franco-British actor, scriptwriter, and director

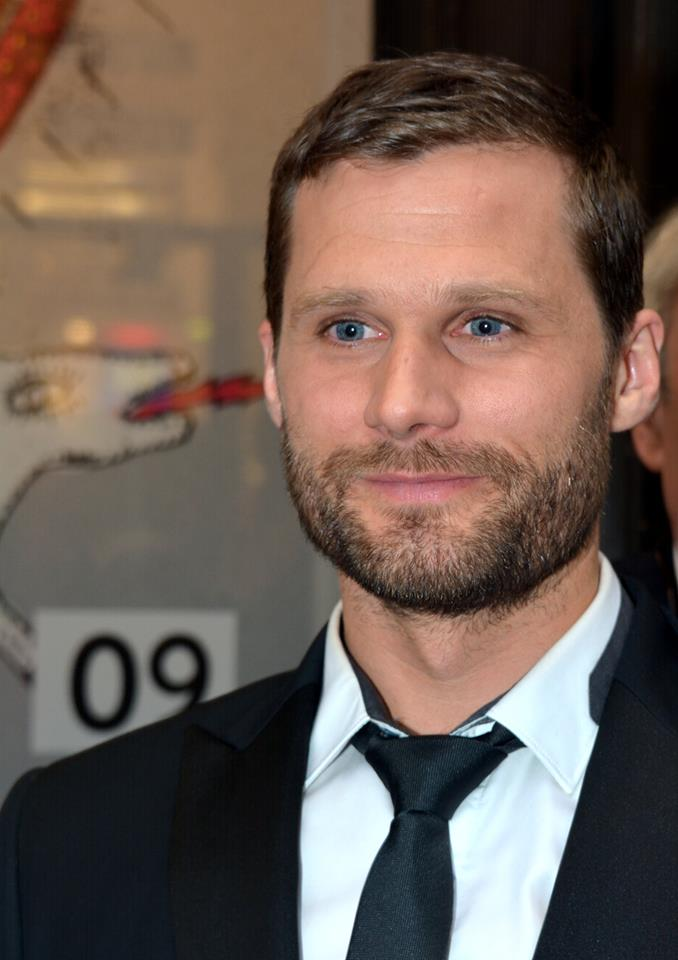
- Michalik in 2018
- Born: 13 December 1982 (age 43); Paris, France
- Citizenship: France; United Kingdom
- Occupations: Actor; director
- Years active: 2001–present

Alexis Michalik (born 13 December 1982) is a French-British actor, scriptwriter and director. He adapted Shakespeare's Romeo and Juliet into his play R & J and he has written and staged his own plays, including Le Porteur d'histoire, Le Cercle des illusionnistes, Edmond and Intra Muros. He has acted in a number of films, including Sagan by Diane Kurys and Le Chant du loup by Abel Lanzac and he has acted in a number of TV series, mini-series, and TV films, including the series Kaboul Kitchen by Allan Mauduit and Jean-Patrick Benes. He has received various Molière awards for his plays.

== Education ==
He is the son of a Polish father, an artist, and a British mother. He was raised in the quartier des Abbesses in the 18th arrondissement of Paris. He also holds dual French and British citizenship. He studied at the collège Jules-Ferry, and at the conservatoire in the 19th arrondissement, and he passed the entrance examination for the Conservatoire national d'art dramatique.

== Career ==
=== Theatre director and scriptwriter ===
His first stage role was as Roméo in 2001, in the play Juliette et Roméo directed by Irina Brook at the théâtre de Chaillot.

In 2003, he was admitted to the Conservatoire national supérieur d'art dramatique (CNSAD) in Paris. However, he gave up his place to stage his first show, Une folle journée, an adaptation of Mariage de Figaro by Beaumarchais. He created the show in 2005 at the Festival d'Avignon Off in the théâtre des Corps Saints, playing the role of the Count. Michalik used the name of his source material to name his theatre company, Los Figaros.

In 2006, he created La Mégère à peu près apprivoisée at Théâtre La Luna (Buffon), a musical comedy adaptation of the play by Shakespeare, in which he played the role of Petruchio. He met Arthur Jugnot, who produced the play in Avignon in 2007 et 2008, at the théâtre des Béliers, then in 2009 at the Vingtième Théâtre and then in 2010 at Le Splendid. The adaption was then put on television on the show Paris Première. During this show, he met Dominique Besnehard, the show's host, who would later produce two of Michalik's first short films.

In 2008, he created R&J, an adaptation of Roméo et Juliette by Shakespeare for three actors. In this production, he played various roles, including Romeo. The play was done in the théâtre des Béliers in Avignon, and then at the Ciné 13 Théâtre and at Studio des Champs-Elysées.

In 2010, he adapted and directed the second act of Carmen by Bizet, in a show titled Carmen Rock & Soul Opéra. The show, which was put on at the Festival des Mises en capsules, starred the singer Julie Zenatti in the title role and Christophe Mali (Tryo) playing Don José, and 20 other actors, singers, dancers and musicians. The show as done at Ciné 13 Théâtre.

Then Benjamin Bellecour, co-director of Ciné 13 Théâtre, invited Michalik to write and direct Michalik's first play, Le Porteur d'histoire. The play was done in a shortened form at the Festival Faits d'Hiver. In July 2011, the play was done in its current form at Théâtre des Béliers . The play came back to Avignon in 2012 and also was done in Paris at Théâtre 13 Jardin, where it was received well by the public and critics. His play was done again at the Studio des Champs-Élysées in February 2013 and at Théâtre des Béliers in 2017.

In January 2014, he wrote his second play, Le Cercle des illusionnistes, which was produced at the théâtre de La Pépinière in Paris. The play blends fictional elements with the biography o Robert-Houdin and filmmaker Georges Méliès. It was performed in 2014 and it was also performed at the Théâtre des Béliers parisiens.

Le Porteur d'histoire and Le cercle des illusionnistes were both nominated for the Molières 2014 award in the categories of Meilleur Spectacle de Théâtre Privé, Meilleur Auteur Francophone Vivant, and Meilleur Metteur en Scène de Théâtre Privé. Le cercle des illusionnistes was also nominated for Molière de la révélation féminine (by Jeanne Arènes) and Molière de la Création Visuelle (by Marion Rebmann, Olivier Roset, and Pascal Sautelet).

Alexis Michalik won two Molière awards in 2014 : Auteur et Metteur en scène. Jeanne Arènes was also recognized.

In 2016, he created Edmond at Théâtre du Palais-Royal, a play that explored that challenging creation of Cyrano de Bergerac by Edmond Rostand. The dramaturg was played by the comedian Guillaume Sentou. In the 2017 Molière awards, Edmond got seven nominations : Molière du Théâtre privé, Molière de la Comédie, Molière du Comédien dans un second rôle, Molière de la Révélation masculine, Molière de l'auteur francophone vivant, Molière du Metteur en scène d'un spectacle de Théâtre privé and Molière de la Création visuelle. The play is still performed today in 2025

In 2017, he created Intra Muros at Théâtre 13, a play that was part of a theatre course in a prison; it examined the history of various characters. The play's lead actors included Jeanne Arènes, Bernard Blancan, Alice de Lencquesaing, Paul Jeanson and Faycal Safi.The music and soundtrack were done on stage by Raphaël Charpentier.

=== Television and film acting ===
Michalik appeared in the television series Diane, femme flic on TF1 between 2002 and 2004, playing the role of lieutenant Sam. He then had roles in a number of TV films, series and sagas, including Petits meurtres en famille and Terre de lumière on France 2. He acted in the films Sagan by Diane Kurys, L'Autre Dumas by Safy Nebbou, L'Âge de raison by Yann Samuell, Des gens qui s'embrassent by Danièle Thompson, La Banda de Picasso by Fernando Colomo, and 24 jours, la vérité sur l'affaire Ilan Halimi by Alexandre Arcady...

Since 2012, he has played the role of Damien in the series Kaboul Kitchen on Canal+. In 2015, he was part of the Anglophone cast of Versailles, for Canal+.

=== Director and screenwriter ===
In 2013, Michalik did his first short film, Au Sol, which drew on the blog Rue89. The film, which was released in September 2014 on France 2, garnered 30 selections and 15 festival prizes.

In 2014, he did his second short film, Pim-Poum le petit Panda for the Talents Cannes Adami. This musical comedy was co-written with Benjamin Bellecour.

In January 2019, he directed his first full-length film, an adaptation of his play Edmond.

He took on a musical comedy for the first time in 2021 by directing a stage production of The Producers at the Théâtre de Paris; at the time of its premiere Michalik had six of his productions on stage in Paris concurrently. The show received five nominations for the French Trophées de la comédie musicale, winning the best production.

== Filmography ==
=== Actor ===
Year	Title	Role	Director	Notes
2001	Julie Lescaut	Victor	Vincent Monnet	TV Series (1 Episode)
2002	La bande du drugstore	The communist	François Armanet	
2003	Far West	Jean-Didier	Pascal-Alex Vincent	Short
2003–2008	Diane, femme flic	Sam	Marc Angelo, Dominique Tabuteau, ...	TV Series (12 Episodes)
2004	Big Kiss	Taras	Billy Zane	
2004	Haute coiffure	Silvio	Marc Rivière	TV Movie
2004	Femmes de loi	Franck Montero	Denis Malleval	TV Series (1 Episode)
2005	ER	Michel Timbaud	Christopher Chulack	TV Series (1 Episode)
2006	Monsieur Sorlin architecte	Journalist	Jacques Strang	Short
2006	Les amants de la dent blanche	Théophile	Raymond Vouillamoz	TV Movie
2006	Inconnue de la départementale	Patrice	Didier Bivel	TV Movie
2006	Petits meurtres en famille	Richard	Edwin Baily	TV Mini-Series
2007	Monsieur Max	Jean Marais	Gabriel Aghion	TV Movie
2007	Sauveur Giordano	Patrick	Pierre Joassin	TV Series (1 Episode)
2008	Sagan	Denis Westhoff	Diane Kurys	
2008	L'ex de ma fille	Bastien	Christiane Spiero	TV Movie
2008	Un crime très populaire	Antoine	Didier Grousset	TV Movie
2008	Terre de lumière	Arnaud	Stéphane Kurc	TV Mini-Series
2008	Nicolas Le Floch	Lambert / Yves de Langremont	Edwin Baily	TV Series (1 Episode)
2010	Dumas	Jean-Baptiste Béraud	Safy Nebbou	
2010	With Love... from the Age of Reason	Margaret's assistant	Yann Samuell	
2010	En colo	Jordan	Pascal-Alex Vincent	Short
2010	Le temps de la balle	Thomas	Hervé Jakubowicz	Short
2011	La fin du silence	Luc	Roland Edzard	
2012	La banda Picasso	Barón	Fernando Colomo	
2012–2017	Kaboul Kitchen	Damien	Frédéric Berthe, Frédéric Balekdjian, ...	TV Series (18 Episodes)
2013	Des gens qui s'embrassent	Daniel Touré	Danièle Thompson	
2013	Petrouchka	Raphael	Melodie Grumberg	Short
2013	Louis la brocante	The usurper	Michel Favart	TV Series (1 Episode)
2013	Les Petits Meurtres d'Agatha Christie	Jules Lavigne	Eric Woreth	TV Series (1 Episode)
2014	24 Days	Lieutenant Joubert	Alexandre Arcady	
2014	Kamikaze	Sasha	Álex Pina	
2014	Danbé, la tête haute	Thomas	Bourlem Guerdjou	TV Movie
2014	La Trouvaille de Juliette	Pierrot	Jérôme Navarro	TV Movie
2014	Resistance	Vélin	Miguel Courtois & David Delrieux	TV Mini-Series
2015	Dad in Training	Guillaume	Cyril Gelblat	
2015	Stomach	Leo	Javier Kühn	Short
2015	À ses enfants la patrie reconnaissante	Gaston	Stéphane Landowski	Short
2015–2017	Versailles	Louis de Rohan	Christoph Schrewe, Daniel Roby, ...	TV Series (9 Episodes)
2016	Ares	National Defense Framework	Jean-Patrick Benes	
2016	Toril	Cyril Lucas	Laurent Teyssier	
2017	Mes trésors	Guillaume	Pascal Bourdiaux	
2018	Edmond	Georges Feydeau	Alexis Michalik	
2018	Little Tickles	Sonia's father	Andréa Bescond & Eric Métayer	
2018	At Eternity's Gate	Artist at the Café du Tambourin	Julian Schnabel	
2018	L'échappée	Surgeon	Laetitia Martinoni	Short
2019	The Wolf's Call	Second SNLE-B2R	Antonin Baudry	
2020	Tolo Tolo	Alexandre Lemaître	Checco Zalone	
2020	A Mermaid in Paris	Victor	Mathias Malzieu	
2020	10 jours sans maman	Thierry Di Caprio	Ludovic Bernard	
2020	Venise N'Existe Pas	Charles	Ana Girardot	Short
2026	Twenty Twenty Six	Eric Van Dupuytrens	John Morton	BBC Two TV series

=== Filmmaker ===
Year	Title	Notes
2014	Au sol	Short; Milwaukee Film Festival – Audience Award; Cleveland International Film Festival – Best International Short Film; Tirana International Film Festival – Best First Short Film; Nominated – Leeds International Film Festival – Best New Director; Nominated – Odense International Film Festival – Best International Film
2014	Pim-Poum le petit panda	Short
2016	Friday Night	Short
2018	Edmond	Nominated – Globe de Cristal Award for Best Comedy

== Theater ==
Year	Title	Author	Notes
2009–2010	The Taming of the Shrew	William Shakespeare	
2010	Romeo and Juliet	William Shakespeare	
2012–2014	Le Porteur d'histoire	Alexis Michalik	Molière Award for Best Director in a Private Theatre; Molière Award for Best Living Francophone Playwright; Nominated – Molière Award for Best Show in a Private Theatre
2014	Le Cercle des illusionnistes	Alexis Michalik	Molière Award for Best Director in a Private Theatre; Molière Award for Best Living Francophone Playwright; Nominated – Molière Award for Best Show in a Private Theatre; Nominated – Molière Award for Best Visual Creation
2016	Edmond	Alexis Michalik	Molière Award for Best Show in a Private Theatre; Molière Award for Best Director in a Private Theatre; Molière Award for Best Living Francophone Playwright; Nominated – Molière Award for Best Comedy; Nominated – Molière Award for Best Visual Creation
2017	Intra Muros	Alexis Michalik	
2020	Une histoire d'amour	Alexis Michalik	Molière Award for Best Director in a Private Theatre; Nominated – Molière Award for Best Show in a Private Theatre; Nominated – Molière Award for Best Living Francophone Playwright
2021	The Producers	Mel Brooks	
2024	Passeport	Alexis Michalik	

== Annexes ==
=== Bibliography ===
Interview

- Frédéric Bosser; Alexis Michalik (December 2018 – January 2019). "Alexis Michalik, un homme pressé !". dBD. No. 129. pp. 62–65.
