= War of the Buttons (1994 film) =

- Theatrical release poster
- Directed by: John Roberts
- Screenplay by: Colin Welland
- Based on: La Guerre des boutons by Louis Pergaud War of the Buttons by Yves Robert
- Produced by: David Puttnam
- Starring: Liam Cunningham; Gregg Fitzgerald; Colm Meaney
- Cinematography: Bruno de Keyzer
- Edited by: David Freeman
- Music by: Rachel Portman
- Production companies: Enigma Productions; Fujisankei Communications Group; Hugo Films; Les Productions de la Guéville
- Distributed by: Warner Bros.
- Release dates: 5 August 1994 (Ireland); 14 October 1994 (United Kingdom); 29 September 1995 (United States)
- Running time: 94 minutes
- Countries: Ireland; United Kingdom; France; Japan; United States
- Language: English
- Box office: $12,712

War of the Buttons is a 1994 comedy-drama adventure film directed by John Roberts. It was written by Colin Welland and based on the French novel La Guerre des boutons, by Louis Pergaud. The story, about two rival boys' gangs in Ireland, the Ballys (working class) and the Carricks (middle class), is set in County Cork, where it was filmed on location.

The film has been classified as a drama and comedy, and the tone is frequently light and humorous. It examines issues of conflict and war, the actions and consequences of violence, and how it can divide and oppose people who can be friends as easily as they can be enemies.

== Plot ==
In Ireland in the 1960s, more precisely the centre of the bridge over the river that separates the Irish villages of Carrickdowse and Ballydowse, there is a white line that few young people dare cross. The boys of each village spend most of their time trying to upstage the other, whether over the sale of hospital raffle tickets, or something more important, such as deciding who is a "tosspot" and who is not, or, for that matter, defining "tosspot". This "War of the Buttons", in which the buttons from the enemies clothes are captured, has gone on as long as the youths can remember, and "to the death", though rarely does either group hurt more than its pride.

The leader of the Ballys is Fergus, the son of a pauper family and an unpromising student who lives in a trailer on the edge of Ballydowse with his mother and abusive stepfather. What Fergus lacks in education, he makes up for in leadership, and the youth of Ballydowse will follow him anywhere. The members of the Ballys include Marie, the narrator, who revisits her memories of what happened from her adult viewpoint. The leader of the Carricks is Jerome, the son of a wealthy family. He is nicknamed Geronimo after the Apache tribal chief.

The story explores how events escalate, gang class differences (the original and main incentive for their war), Fergus's troubles with his oppressive environment, conflicts that arise when the adults of the villages discover the feud, and conflicts within the Ballys. Their tactics to "win" the war, including a nude ambush of their enemies, are shown in great detail. After a series of battles, Fergus denounces Riley as a traitor to the cause before the final showdown which has the Ballys attacking an abandoned castle ruin defended by the Carricks. The Carricks lose, and, taken prisoner, Geronimo himself cuts off his buttons and gives them to Fergus. While the Ballys celebrate in their headquarters, Geronimo, driving Riley's father's tractor like a tank, levels the Bally clubhouse. This puts a bitter end to the War of the Buttons.

Finally fed up, the towns' adults, including Geronimo's father and Fergus' abusive stepfather, reclaim their children. Fergus runs off to the mountains, where Geronimo follows him in an unspoken gesture of solidarity. After being captured, the two boys are put in the church orphanage, where they put aside their differences and become best friends. Marie narrates the coda, expressing that she married one of the boys, and that the other became the couple's closest friend, but she does not reveal whom she chose to wed.

== Cast ==
=== The Ballys ===
- Gregg Fitzgerald as Fergus
- Gerald Kearney as Big Con
- Darragh Naughton as Boffin
- Brendan McNamara as Tim
- Kevin O'Malley as Fishy
- John Cleere as Peter
- Anthony Cunningham as Little Con
- Thomas Kavanagh as Riley
- Eveanna Ryan as Marie
- John Crowley as Pat
- Stuart Dannell-Foran as Tich
- Danielle Tuite as Fionnuala
- Helen O'Leary as Helen
- Yvonne McNamara as Maeve

=== The Carricks ===
- John Coffey as Geronimo
- Paul Batt as Gorilla
- Karl Byrne as Mickey Moon
- Barry Walsh as Willie
- Niall Collins as Chick
- Derek O'Leary as Brendan
- Rory White as Bernard

=== Others ===
- Liam Cunningham as The Master
- Colm Meaney as Geronimo's Dad
- Bairbre Dowling as Geronimo's Mum
- Ger Ryan as Fergus' Mam
- Dervla Kirwan as Adult Marie (Narrator)

== Background ==
The film's story is based on the novel La Guerre des boutons, written by Louis Pergaud and published in 1912. Pergaud's popular book has been reprinted more than 30 times. It has been adapted as film for the first time in the French productions La Guerre des gosses (1936) (fr) and La Guerre des boutons (War of the Buttons, 1962), the latter a black and white film directed by Yves Robert.

The Irish screenplay was written by Colin Welland and the movie was directed by John Roberts. The producer David Puttnam and Welland had worked earlier on the Academy Award-winning Chariots of Fire. This was their second film together. The movie starred a young Alan Maguire, the actor from Corofin, County Clare.

During the same week in September 2011, two new French film adaptations of the novel were released: War of the Buttons, directed by Yann Samuell, set in the 1950s with the Algerian War as backdrop, and War of the Buttons, directed by Christophe Barratier and set during World War II in Occupied France.
