= Dweller on the Threshold =

Dweller on the Threshold may refer to:

- Guardian of the Threshold, an esoteric figure
- The Dweller on the Threshold, a 1911 novel by Robert Hichens
- Dweller at the Threshold, an American electronic music band active from 1993 to 2005
- "Dweller on the Threshold", a 1982 song by Van Morrison
- Dweller on the Threshold, a 2006 album by Tribe of Gypsies
- "Dweller on the Threshold", a 1993 song by Joe Satriani on his album Time Machine
- Dwellers on the Threshold, a 2002 album by Tarwater
- Dweller on the Threshold, a concept in the mystery TV series Twin Peaks
