= William Brandon =

William Brandon may refer to:

- William Brandon (died 1491) (c. 1425–1491), English knight
- William Brandon (standard-bearer) (1456–1485), supporter of Henry VII of England's conquest and father of Charles Brandon, 1st Duke of Suffolk, son of the above
- William Brandon (author) (1914–2002), American writer and historian
- William Brandon (Wisconsin politician) (1815–1891), Wisconsin State Assemblyman
- William L. Brandon (c.1801–1890), Confederate officer
- William W. Brandon (1868–1934), former Governor of Alabama
- William Brandon (musician), alternative rock musician who played with Ocha la Rocha
- William Brandon (MP), Member of Parliament (MP) for New Shoreham
- Will Brandon, character in All for Peggy
