= François Boyer =

French screenwriter (1920–2003)

François Boyer (1920 – 24 May 2003) was a French screenwriter. He achieved considerable success with his first attempt at screenwriting, Forbidden Games (1952). Initially, he found no studio interested in his work, so he redesigned the screenplay as a novel and published it in 1947 under the title The Secret Game. Although the novel achieved little or no success in its native country, it became a huge commercial success in America. All of a sudden, Boyer's novel was a hot property, so director René Clément, in conjunction with two writers Jean Aurenche and Pierre Bost, helped turn it into a screenplay. While Boyer receives story credit for the film, little is known of how much of his own screenplay made it to the screen. The film was a huge international success, and won an Honorary Oscar for the best foreign language film of its year.

Although Boyer remained prolific throughout the 1950s, 1960s and 1970s, little of his subsequent work had as much impact as Forbidden Games. His 1962 film La Guerre des Boutons, however, was remade by producer David Puttnam in 1994 as The War of the Buttons.

== Selected filmography ==
- Les Intrigantes (1954)
- Wild Fruit (1954)
- The Little Rebels (1955)
- A Kiss for a Killer (1957)
- Under the Sign of the Bull (1969)
