= Louis Pergaud =

French novelist, war poet and soldier

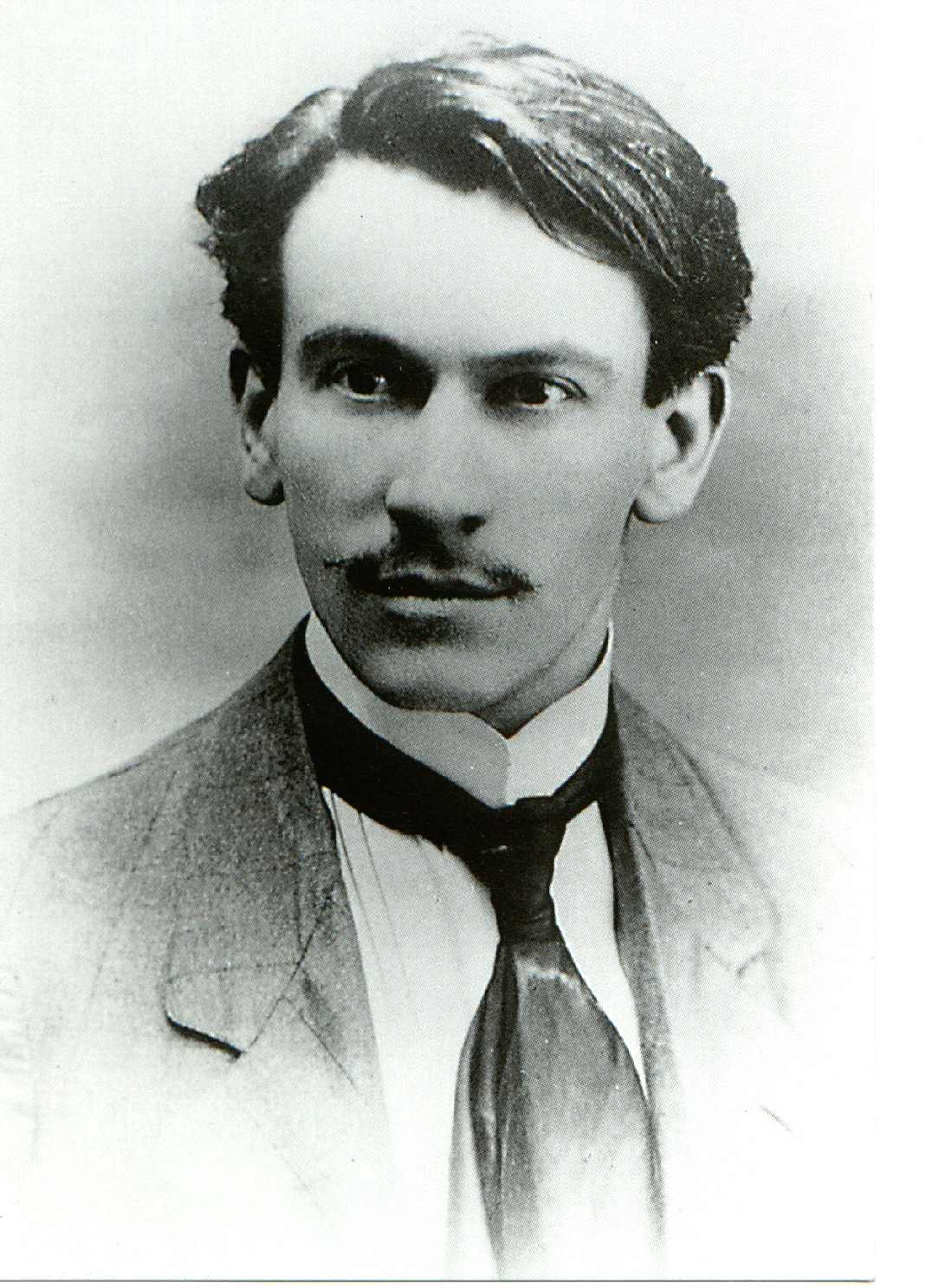
- Louis Pergaud
- Born: 22 January 1882; Belmont, Doubs, France
- Died: 8 April 1915 (aged 33); Marchéville-en-Woëvre, France

Louis Pergaud (French pronunciation: [lwi pɛʁɡo]; 22 January 1882 – 8 April 1915) was a French novelist, war poet, and soldier, whose principal works were known as "Animal Stories" due to his featuring animals of the Franche-Comté in lead roles. His most notable work was the novel La Guerre des boutons (1912) (English: The War of the Buttons). It has been reprinted more than 30 times, and is included on the French high-school curriculum.

A village schoolteacher by profession, Pergaud came into conflict with Roman Catholic clergy and laity because of his orders to instill the ideology favoured by the Third French Republic, which owed more to the anti-religious currents of the Age of Enlightenment than to the values being instilled at home by his pupils' parents. In 1907, Pergaud gave up permanently on teaching and moved to Paris to pursue a literary career. Pergaud's prose works are often considered to reflect the influences of Realist, Decadent and Symbolist movements. During the First World War, he was serving with the French Army near Marchéville-en-Woëvre. During an attack by his company on a German position, he disappeared without a trace on the night of 7 to 8 April 1915. He was declared dead in 1921.

The War of the Buttons has been adapted five times as a film, four times in French productions and once in an Irish one. It was adapted most recently in France in two films released the same week in September 2011. Both were set during the twentieth century.

== Early life ==
Pergaud was born on 22 January 1882, in Belmont, Doubs. Son of a republican schoolmaster, Louis was encouraged to excel in his studies. His academic successes earned him scholarships permitting him to continue school with the intention of following in his father's footsteps. In 1901 he completed his studies at the École Normale in Besançon.

== Marriage and family ==
After a year of teaching and a year of military service, in 1903, Pergaud married his first wife. They lived in Durnes, where he was teaching again. After moving to Landresse for a time, Pergaud separated from his wife in 1907 and moved to Paris.

They later divorced and he married a second time.

== Career ==
Louis Pergaud accepted his first teaching position in Durnes. After a year, he was called to complete a year of military service with the 35th infantry regiment stationed in Belfort. According to Ian Higgins, "National service in 1902-03 did nothing to cure him of his anti-militarism."

In the fall of 1903, Pergaud returned to his post in Durne.

In 1905 Pergaud transferred with his wife to Landresse. Initially, life in this small, isolated village was difficult.

According to Ian Higgins, "The predominantly Catholic villagers of Landresse were hostile to their local teacher, by definition a servant of the Republic, and who never went to Mass. Feeling cut off in an alien environment, tired of constantly battling against suspicion, ill-feeling, innuendo, and accusation, Pergaud resigned his post and went to Paris to work in an office."

In 1907, Pergaud left Landresse and his wife, for Paris, where he joined Leon Deubel, a longtime friend and inspiration. In Paris, Pergaud suffered through extreme poverty, even as he worked as a clerk and then as a schoolteacher, in an effort to realize his dream of literary success.

== Works ==
His earliest works were collections of poetry that were published at his own expense through a literary review called Le Beffroi. The first collection, entitled L'Aube, appeared in 1904. The second, L'Herbe d'Avril, was published in 1908. In 1910 Mercure de France published a collection of Pergaud's short stories under the title De Goupil à Margot. This work was awarded the prestigious Prix Goncourt, which led to some national recognition.

A second collection of short stories about animals, La Revanche du corbeau appeared in 1911. His novel, La Guerre des boutons, described below, was published in 1912. In 1913 Pergaud published the novel, Le Roman de Miraut, in which an animal had the leading role. He wrote numerous other short stories about the people and animals of his native Franche-Comté, which would be published posthumously.

In 1912 La Guerre des boutons was published, a tale of a play-war between the small boys of two neighbouring villages. Those "killed" would have their buttons removed as trophies before being sent home. The novel begins humorously, but becomes more sinister as the distinctions between play and real violence among the boys become blurred. It has been described as having a "touch of Lord of the Flies" in tone, although the book substantially pre-dates that novel by William Golding. Pergaud's works remain popular in France; La Guerre des boutons has been reprinted more than thirty times. It is included in the French high school curriculum for literature.

== World War I ==
Pergaud had tried to register as a pacifist, but he was conscripted into the French Army at the outbreak of the First World War. He had been placed in the active reserve following his national service twelve years before. In this capacity he served in the Battle of Lorraine during the German invasion of France, and subsequently on the Western Front.

On 7 April 1915, Pergaud's regiment attacked the Imperial German Army's trenches during the Battle of Les Éparges near Fresnes-en-Woëvre. Pergaud was shot and wounded before falling into barbed wire, which left him trapped. Some hours later, German soldiers rescued him and other wounded, taking the French soldiers to a temporary field hospital behind German lines. On the morning of 8 April, Pergaud and other POWs were killed by friendly fire from a French artillery barrage that destroyed the hospital. The deliberate targeting of field hospitals, hospital ships, and medical personnel was classified as a war crime under the Hague Conventions of 1899 and 1907, which had been signed by the government of the Third French Republic.

== Adaptations of his works ==
La Guerre des boutons has been developed as a film five times:

- La Guerre des Gosses (1936, France) by Jacques Daroy
- La Guerre des Boutons (1962, France), black-and-white, directed by Yves Robert. It was released in a restored version in 2011.
- War of the Buttons (1994, Ireland), by John Roberts
- War of the Buttons (2011, France), directed by Yann Samuell and produced by Marc du Pontavice. (This version is set during the 1960s and the backdrop of the Algerian War.)
- War of the Buttons (2011, France), directed by Christophe Barratier and produced by Thomas Langmann. (This version is set during World War II and the German Occupation of France)

== Legacy and honors ==
A Paris society, Les Amis de Louis Pergaud, is devoted to study of him and his works.
