= Quai d'Orsay (comics) =

Comics series

Quai d'Orsay is a 2010 comic book by Abel Lanzac (pseudonym for Antonin Baudry) and illustrator Christophe Blain, published by Dargaud in two volumes.

The book is inspired by Baudry's experiences as a senior diplomat at the French Ministry of Foreign Affairs (known colloquially as Quai d'Orsay, after its location in Paris) where he worked as former foreign minister Dominique de Villepin's speechwriter for several years.

The second volume won the Fauve d'or award at the Angoulême International Comics Festival in 2013.

The comic was adapted by its authors into a 2013 film titled The French Minister, directed by veteran French film-maker Bertrand Tavernier.

In 2014, an English translation was released, under the name Weapons of Mass Diplomacy.
