= The Needle Was Traveling =

Studio album by Tarwater
- Released: 21 March 2005 (Germany)
- Genres: Indietronica, post-rock
- Label: Morr Music

Tarwater chronology
Dwellers on the Threshold	The Needle Was Traveling	Spider Smile

The Needle Was Traveling is the sixth full-length release by Tarwater, an electronic music group from Berlin, Germany. The album debuted on 22 March 2005.

== Track listing ==
1. "Across the Dial"
2. "Stone"
3. "Seven of Nine"
4. "Entry"
5. "Babylonian Tower"
6. "TV Blood"
7. "The People"
8. "All That"
9. "Jackie"
10. "Yeah!"
11. "In a Single Place"
12. "Ninety Days"
13. "Unseen in the Disco"
14. "Home Tonight"

== Lyric origin ==
Many of the lyrics from The Needle Was Traveling are direct sentences that can be found in various short stories or books, with each song relating to a singular, specific story. For example, the lyrics from "Across the Dial" can be found in Roald Dahl's "The Sound Machine," a short story in his collection Skin and Other Stories. "Ninety Days" lyrics can be read from text in Valis, a science fiction novel written by Philip K. Dick.
