= War of the Buttons (1962 film) =

La Guerre des boutons (War of the Buttons)
- Theatrical release poster
- Directed by: Yves Robert
- Written by: Louis Pergaud (novel); François Boyer
- Produced by: Danièle Delorme; Yves Robert; Léon Carré
- Starring: André Treton; Michel Isella; Martin Lartigue; Michel Galabru; Jean Richard
- Cinematography: André Bac
- Edited by: Marie-Josèphe Yoyotte
- Music by: José Berghmans
- Distributed by: Warner Bros.
- Release date: 18 April 1962
- Running time: 90 minutes
- Country: France
- Language: French

La Guerre des boutons or War of the Buttons is a 1962 French film directed by Yves Robert. War of the Buttons is about two rival kid gangs whose playful combats escalate into violence. The title derives from the buttons that are cut off from the rival team's clothes as combat trophies. The film is based on La Guerre des boutons, a novel by Louis Pergaud (1882–1915), who was killed in action in World War I and whose works portray a fervent anti-militarism.

The young and largely untrained actors included André Treton ("Lebrac"), Michel Isella ("l'Aztec") and Martin Lartigue ("Petit Gibus"). The character Petit Gibus's line of dialogue - uttered in frustration - "si j'aurais su, j'aurais pas v'nu" ("if I woulda known, I wouldn'ta come"), with its incorrect grammar (the correct form should be: "si j'avais su, je ne serais pas venu") has become a familiar tagline in France (the line was not in the original novel).

The film won France's Prix Jean Vigo.

The film was remade in Ireland in 1994 as War of the Buttons, in an Irish setting, and again in France in 2011, with the original title.

== Cast ==
- Jacques Dufilho - L'Aztec's father
- Yvette Etiévant - Lebrac's mother
- Michel Galabru - Bacaillé's father
- Michèle Méritz - L'Aztec's mother
- Jean Richard - Lebrac's father
- Pierre Tchernia - Bédouin
- Pierre Trabaud - School teacher
- Claude Confortès - Nestor the postman
- Paul Crauchet - Touegueule
- Henri Labussière - A countryman
- Yves Peneau - The prefect
- Robert Rollis - Migue la lune's father
- Louisette Rousseau - Bacaillé's mother
- Christophe Bourseiller - Gaston
- Claude Bourseiller
- Tsilla Chelton
- François Boyer - The priest (uncredited)
- Marie-Catherine Faburel - Marie-Tintin (uncredited)
- Michel Isella - L'Aztec (uncredited)
- François Lartigue - Grand Gibus (uncredited)
- Martin Lartigue - Petit Gibus (uncredited)
- André Treton - Lebrac (uncredited)
- Claude Meunier - Bacaillé
