= 11/6 12/10 =

Studio album by Tarwater
- Released: 30 September 1996
- Recorded: Calyx Mastering (Berlin, DE)
- Genre: Electronic
- Length: 44:27
- Label: Kitty-Yo
- Producer: Bo Kondren

Tarwater chronology
| 11/6 12/10 (1996) | Rabbit Moon (1997) |

Professional ratings
Review scores
| Source | Rating |
|---|---|
| AllMusic | 4/5 stars |

11/6 12/10 is the debut studio album by electronic duo Tarwater, released on 30 September 1996, by Kitty-Yo.

== Track listing ==
| No. | Title | Length |
|---|---|---|
| 1. | "Theme" | 2:00 |
| 2. | "Tar" | 5:30 |
| 3. | "Han er der Inne" | 4:14 |
| 4. | "Euroslut" | 5:43 |
| 5. | "Rome" | 4:20 |
| 6. | "Conquer Rome Itself" | 0:52 |
| 7. | "New Brood" | 4:29 |
| 8. | "Kleenex" | 4:21 |
| 9. | "Elbow on the Quilt" | 3:12 |
| 10. | "Second Arthyr" | 5:04 |
| 11. | "Inversnaid" | 4:42 |

== Personnel ==
Adapted from the 11/6 12/10 liner notes.

Tarwater

- Bernd Jestram – guitar, bass guitar, programming
- Ronald Lippok – lead vocals, drums, programming

Additional musicians

- Eike Morelle – viola

Production and additional personnel

- Klara Hell – design
- Rainer Jestram – photography
- Bo Kondren – production

== Release history ==
| Region | Date | Label | Format | Catalog |
|---|---|---|---|---|
| German | 1996 | Kitty-Yo | CD | 009 |
