= Union for the Defense of Tradesmen and Artisans =

French political movement (1953–1962)

Union for the Defense of Tradesmen & Artisans Union de défense des commerçants et artisans
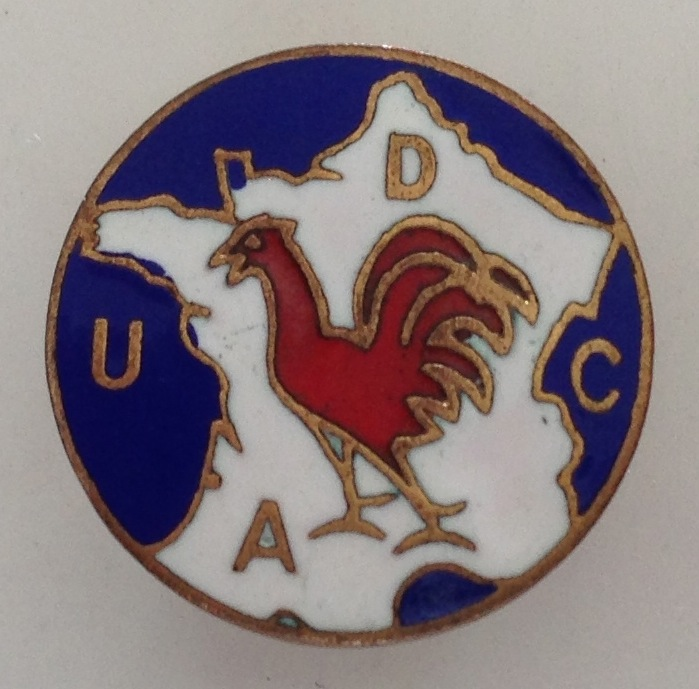
- A lapel pin with the party's logo
- Abbreviation: UDCA
- Leader: Pierre Poujade
- Founded: 29 November 1953
- Dissolved: 1962
- Newspaper: Fraternité française
- Membership: Up to 800,000
- Ideology: Poujadism; Right-wing populism
- Political position: Right-wing to far-right
- National Assembly (1956): 52 / 595

The Union for the Defense of Tradesmen and Artisans (French: Union de défense des commerçants et artisans, UDCA), known as French Union and Fraternity (Union et fraternité française) after 1956, was a right-wing populist political party in France from 1953 to 1962, led by Pierre Poujade.

== History ==
The UDCA was founded in 1953 by Pierre Poujade as a tax protest organisation in the Lot Department in Occitania. It published a newspaper, Fraternité française. It also had an anthem, written by André Montagard in 1955. Poujade recruited up to 800,000 members.

In the 1956 legislative election the party took 12.62% of the vote, winning 52 seats in the National Assembly, primarily from rural areas. In the assembly, the party changed its name to Union et fraternité françaises (French Union and Fraternity). One of its deputies was a young Jean-Marie Le Pen, elected for the Seine Department's 3rd electoral district. The party sat in opposition to Guy Mollet's government.

The movement promoted repealing taxes for small business owners. By 1958, it had become strongly opposed to Charles de Gaulle's policy of decolonisation in French Algeria. It was also opposed to the proposed European Defence Community. It supported a "new Estates General" which would restructure the political system.

It exhibited some antisemitic tendencies; its leader said that "[Prime Minister Pierre Mendès France, who was Jewish] is French only as the word added to his name".

After Charles de Gaulle re-entered the political fray in 1958, the movement largely faded from view, failing to hold its position in the 1958 legislative election. Deprived of its parliamentary representation, it dissolved in 1962 because of infighting.
