= The French Minister =

2013 film

- French theatrical release poster
- French: Quai d'Orsay
- Directed by: Bertrand Tavernier
- Written by: Antonin Baudry; Christophe Blain; Bertrand Tavernier
- Produced by: Frédéric Bourboulon; Jérôme Seydoux
- Starring: Thierry Lhermitte; Raphaël Personnaz; Niels Arestrup
- Cinematography: Jérôme Alméras
- Edited by: Guy Lecome
- Music by: Philippe Sarde
- Production companies: Little Bear; Pathé; France 2 Cinéma; CN2 Productions; Alvy Développement
- Distributed by: Pathé
- Release dates: 9 September 2013 (TIFF); 6 November 2013 (France)
- Running time: 113 minutes
- Country: France
- Language: French
- Budget: $10.6 million
- Box office: $5.6 million

The French Minister (French: Quai d'Orsay, or by metonymy the Ministry for Europe and Foreign Affairs (France)) is a 2013 French comedy film directed by Bertrand Tavernier, his final narrative film. Based on Quai d'Orsay, a comic strip by Christophe Blain and Abel Lanzac, the film takes an initially comedic look at the French Foreign Ministry under Dominique de Villepin but moves into more serious territory as France, in co-operation with Germany, opposes the 2003 Invasion of Iraq.

It was screened in the Special Presentation section at the 2013 Toronto International Film Festival. In January 2014, the film received three nominations at the 39th César Awards, with Niels Arestrup winning the award for Best Supporting Actor.

== Plot ==
After graduating from the École nationale d'administration, Arthur Vlaminck works as a speechwriter in the Foreign Ministry. Senior advisers do not welcome a newcomer who may become a competitor, but his work is recognised by the Minister and by Maupas, the official heading the department. Coming up with text for changing world situations and the reactions of the Minister requires significant adjustment. He submits drafts past Maupas and other senior advisers who criticize them, before finding that the Minister's requirements have changed. The film ends in February 2003 with a re-enactment of the speech by Dominique de Villepin to the UN Security Council, where he responded to claims by Colin Powell and Donald Rumsfeld and argued for the disarmament of Iraq without invasion.

== Cast ==
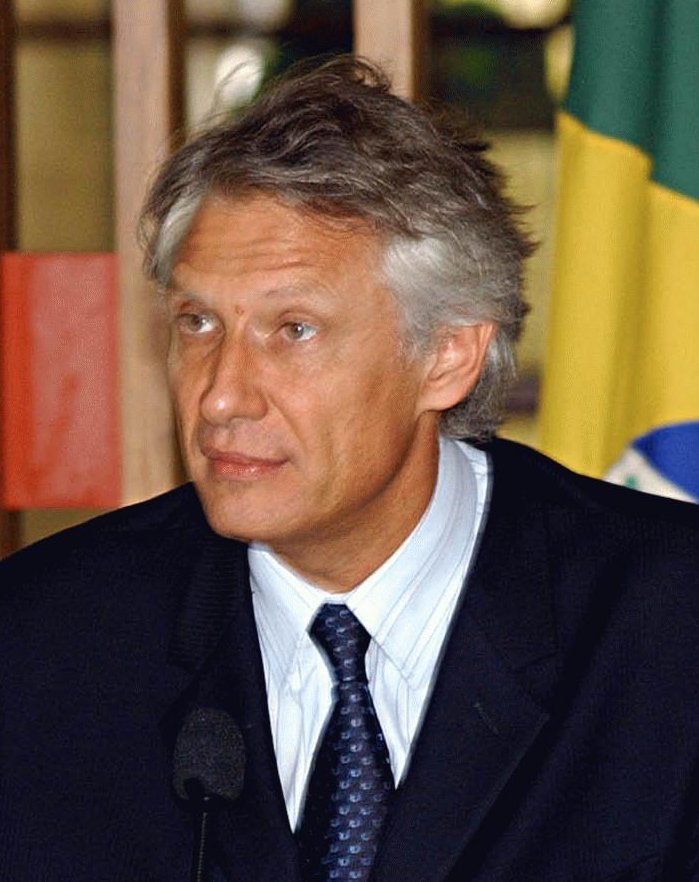
The minister character is based on Dominique de Villepin.

- Thierry Lhermitte as Alexandre Taillard de Worms (based on Dominique de Villepin), French Minister of Foreign Affairs
- Raphaël Personnaz as Arthur Vlaminck, a young speechwriter
- Niels Arestrup as Claude Maupas, the phlegmatic civil servant who actually runs the ministry
- Julie Gayet as Valérie Dumontheil, special adviser on Africa
- Jane Birkin as Molly Hutchinson, winner of the Nobel Prize for Literature
- Anaïs Demoustier as Marina, Arthur's fiancée
- Alix Poisson as Odile, Maupas' secretary
- Sonia Rolland as Nathalie, special adviser on relations with Parliament
- Marie Bunel as Martine, the minister's secretary
- Thomas Chabrol as Sylvain Marquet, special adviser on Europe
- François Perrot as Antoine Taillard

== Locations ==
The film includes scenes shot in Berlin near the Reichstag, Dakar as a fictional African country, and the United Nations Building in New York.

== Quoted material ==
- The film sections are preceded by quotations from the Fragments of the Greek philosopher Heraclitus.
- The final speech at the UN is taken from de Villepin's address on Iraq at the United Nations Security Council on 14 February 2003.
