= Dumas (film) =

- Film poster
- L'Autre Dumas
- Directed by: Safy Nebbou
- Screenplay by: Gilles Taurand; Safy Nebbou
- Based on: the play Signé Dumas by Cyril Gély and Eric Rouquette
- Produced by: Frank Le Wita; Marc de Bayser
- Starring: Gérard Depardieu; Benoît Poelvoorde
- Cinematography: Stéphane Fontaine
- Edited by: Bernard Sasia
- Music by: Hugues Tabar-Nouval
- Distributed by: UGC Distribution
- Release date: 10 February 2010
- Running time: 105 minutes
- Country: France
- Language: French
- Budget: €9.6 million
- Box office: $1.6 million

Dumas (French: L'Autre Dumas (English: The Other Dumas)) is a 2010 French film directed by Safy Nebbou about 19th-century French author Alexandre Dumas.

== Plot ==
In February 1848, Alexandre Dumas (Gérard Depardieu) is at the height of his fame. He has withdrawn for a few days into the immense Château de Monte-Cristo near Le Port-Marly, that he is building. There he works with his collaborator, Auguste Maquet (Benoît Poelvoorde). If the books bear Dumas' name, the tiring work undertaken by Maquet is colossal. Nevertheless, for ten years, Maquet has remained in the great man's shadow and never challenged his supremacy. When a quarrel breaks out between the two men, after Maquet passes himself off as Dumas in order to seduce Charlotte (Mélanie Thierry), a crucial question presents itself: what is the exact part each man has in the work's success? Who is the father of d'Artagnan, and of Monte Cristo? In short, who is really the author? Their formerly peaceful relationship is now in doubt and topples over into confrontation. And not far away, in Paris, a revolution is building which will seal the fate of another relationship—that of Louis-Philippe— with the people of France.

== Cast ==
- Gérard Depardieu – Alexandre Dumas
- Benoît Poelvoorde – Auguste Maquet
- Dominique Blanc – Céleste Scriwaneck
- Mélanie Thierry – Charlotte Desrives
- Catherine Mouchet – Caroline Maquet
- Jean-Christophe Bouvet – M. Bocquin
- Philippe Magnan – Guizot
- Florence Pernel – Ida Ferrier Dumas
- Michel Duchaussoy – Sub-prefect Crémieux
- Roger Dumas – M. de Saint Omer
- Ophélia Kolb – Marion
- Christian Abart – Inspector Flanchet
- Alexis Michalik – Jean-Baptiste Béraud

== Reception ==
The Council of Black Associations of France criticized the decision to cast the white actor Gérard Depardieu to play the part of Dumas, who "was the grandson of a Haitian slave and often referred to himself as a negro".
