= Give Me Your Hand (film) =

- Film poster
- Donne-moi la main
- Directed by: Pascal-Alex Vincent
- Written by: Pascal-Alex Vincent; Olivier Nicklaus; Martin Drouot
- Produced by: Nicolas Brevière
- Starring: Alexandre Carril; Victor Carril; Anaïs Demoustier
- Cinematography: Alexis Kavyrchine
- Edited by: Dominique Petrot
- Music by: Tarwater
- Production companies: Local Films; Busse & Halberschmidt Filmproduktion
- Distributed by: Bodega Films (France)
- Release dates: 27 November 2008 (TFF); 28 February 2009 (France); 26 February 2009 (Germany)
- Running time: 80 minutes
- Countries: France; Germany
- Language: French

Give Me Your Hand (French: Donne-moi la main) is a 2008 French-German drama film directed by Pascal-Alex Vincent. The soundtrack was composed by electronic/post rock band Tarwater.

== Plot ==
The film opens with a scene rendered through hand-drawn Japanese-style animation in which eighteen-year-old identical twin brothers, Antoine and Quentin, flee from their father's bakery and dodge a train on their way out of their native village in France. The medium then shifts to a live-action film as they commence a journey to attend the funeral of their mother, whom neither has ever met, in Spain. While the brothers make arrangements to hitchhike with the owner of a Volkswagen, gas-station attendant Clémentine quits her job on a whim and jumps into the back of the vehicle, where she has sex with Quentin on a mattress in the back of the van. Antoine jealous, initiates a fistfight with his brother, and then has sex with the girl himself when they camp for the night. The girl abruptly leaves in the morning.

Travel continues, with Quentin whining and complaining, he asks if they could take a train. The brothers soon after stop at a farm for a few days to earn money for train tickets. While collecting hay bales in the fields, Quentin is befriended by another young laborer named Hakim, who offers him pot and initiates a clandestine sexual relationship. Antoine observes the tryst in the dark, and the following morning silently insists that he and his brother leave even though they are still short of the money needed to buy their tickets. At a restaurant outside the train station, Antoine sees a man cruising for sex, and when Quentin goes to the bathroom, Antoine pimps his brother for one hundred Euros. The john corners Quentin and tries unsuccessfully to penetrate him before he escapes. Unable to locate his brother, Antoine boards the train alone. When he awakes, he vaguely laments his contentious relationship with his brother to a stranger sitting across from him, who responds that she adored her imaginary sister as a child, but ends by remarking that their tranquility was possible only because the sister was make believe.

Resuming his cross-country odyssey alone, Antoine crosses a thickly-wooded vale and briefly glimpses what he thinks is his brother, but racing down a hill falls and cracks his head against a stone. A middle-aged woman finds him with bugs crawling over his face and brings him to her remote cottage, where she violently bathes him and later performs a brusque handjob on him as he sleeps. Antoine absconds in the morning and gets picked up by a Spaniard and his diabetic father. When Antoine finally arrives at his destination, he sees Quentin, approaches him silently from behind, and gingerly presses his fingers into his brother's hand. After the funeral, Quentin tells Antoine that their father is expecting them home, and the two run across the beach into the ocean, where they brutally brawl in the waves. Quentin knocks Antoine unconscious and pulls his limp body back onto the shore. Antoine suddenly awakes and vomits. First sobbing with relief and then becoming stoical, Quentin stands, turns his back on his brother, and retreats towards the sunset.

== Cast ==
- Alexandre Carril – Antoine
- Victor Carril – Quentin
- Anaïs Demoustier – Clémentine
- Samir Harrag – Hakim
- Fernando Ramallo – Angel

== Production ==
In the early 2000s, director Pascal-Alex Vincent heard a report of adolescent twins in the aristocratic French neighborhood of Marais with a penchant for street brawling. Vincent first cast them in a short film called Bébé Requin, which competed at Cannes in 2005, and later built the screenplay for Give Me Your Hand around their real-life druthers for violent wrestling.

== Critical response ==
On review-aggregating site Rotten Tomatoes, the film holds a rating of 40% based on 10 reviews, with an average rating of 4.9/10. On Metacritic, the film has a score of 50 out of 100 based on 5 reviews, indicating "mixed or average reviews". Mike Hale of the New York Times compared the film unfavorably to the picaresque road trip film Going Places, and lamented that the motives behind the brothers' resentment and violence never gets explained. Writing for The Guardian, Peter Bradshaw noted that while the actors "have moody, high-cheekboned presence", there is nevertheless "something preposterous about the leads and their smouldering emotions".
