= Tarwater (band) =

German music duo

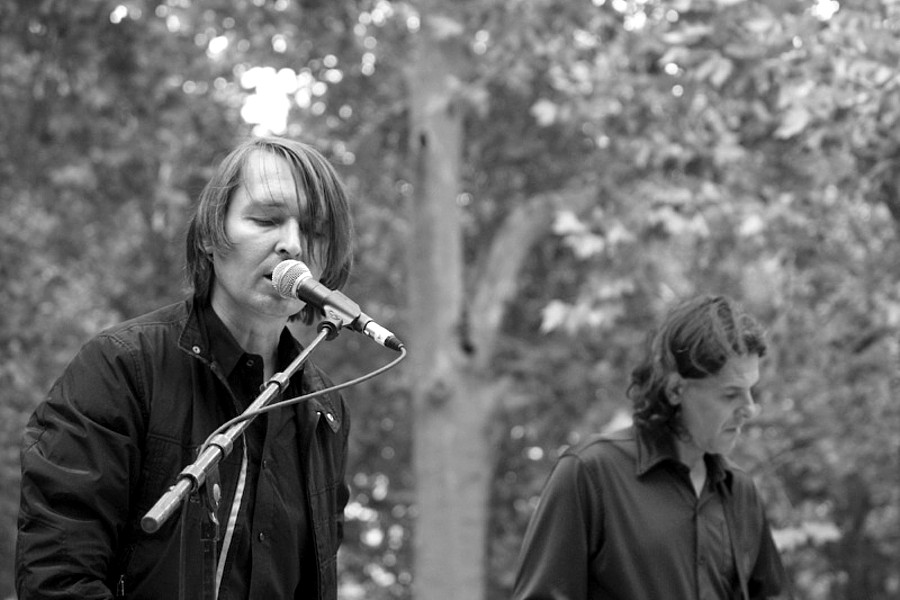

Background information
- Origin: Berlin, Germany
- Genres: Indie rock, post-rock
- Years active: 1995 – Present
- Labels: Kitty-Yo, Mute, Morr Music
- Members: Ronald Lippok; Bernd Jestram
- Website: http://www.tarwater.de/

Tarwater is a German music duo comprising Bernd Jestram and Ronald Lippok. Tarwater have recorded several albums of mostly instrumental music usually tagged as post-rock.

== History ==
Jestram and Lippok met in an East German punk rock band, and began recording together even while Lippok recorded with To Rococo Rot and Jestram worked in his Bleibeil studio. The first Tarwater album debuted with 1996's 11/6 12/10, released around the same time first album came about. Tarwater's second album, Silur, followed in 1998. The critical praise attendant on the latter earned Tarwater American distribution, with Animals Suns & Atoms appearing in 2000 and Dwellers on the Threshold in 2004. In 2005, the album The Needle Was Traveling appeared. It was their first album for the Morr label.

== Discography ==
=== Albums ===
- 11/6 12/10 (1996)
- Rabbit Moon (1997)
- Silur (1998)
- Rabbit Moon - Revisited (1998)
- Animals Suns & Atoms (2000)
- Not The Wheel (2001)
- Dwellers on the Threshold (2002)
- The Needle Was Traveling (2005)
- Spider Smile (2007)
- Inside the Ships (2011)
- Adrift (2014)
- Nanocluster, Vol. I (2021) (collaboration with Immersion, Laetitia Sadier and others)
- Nuts of Ay (2024)

=== Extended Plays ===
- Japan Tour EP (2005)

=== Soundtracks ===
- Donne-moi la main Original Soundtrack (2009)
