= Satoshi Kon: The Illusionist =

2021 documentary from Pascal-Alex Vincent

- Poster
- French: Satoshi Kon, l'illusionniste
- Directed by: Pascal-Alex Vincent
- Written by: Pascal-Alex Vincent
- Produced by: Kenzô Horikoshi; Tarô Maki; Vincent Paul-Boncour
- Starring: Darren Aronofsky; Marc Caro; Jérémy Clapin; Megumi Hayashibara; Mamoru Hosoda; Junko Iwao; Mamoru Oshii; Rodney Rothman; Aya Suzuki; Sadayuki Murai
- Cinematography: Toshiyuki Kiyomura; Gordon Spooner
- Edited by: Clément Selitzki
- Music by: Théo Chapira
- Production companies: Allerton Films; Carlotta Films
- Distributed by: Carlotta Films
- Release date: August 5, 2021 (Fantasia International Film Festival)
- Running time: 81 minutes
- Country: France
- Language: English

Satoshi Kon: The Illusionist (French: Satoshi Kon, l'illusionniste) is a 2021 documentary film directed by Pascal-Alex Vincent. The film celebrates the legacy of Japanese anime director Satoshi Kon. The production features interviews with animators, voice actors, producers, directors, and writers who worked with Kon during his career.

== Premise ==
The film is a documentary on the career of Japanese anime director Satoshi Kon, who is often regarded as one of the leading figures in animation. The film follows the growth of Kon's career from his debut film Perfect Blue (1997) to his unfinished production The Dreaming Machine. The documentary features interviews from his collaborators, including animators, animation historians, voice actors, producers, directors, and writers. The cast includes Darren Aronofsky, Jérémy Clapin, Marc Caro, Mamoru Oshii, and Rodney Rothman.

== Featured cast of subjects ==
- Darren Aronofsky
- Marc Caro
- Jérémy Clapin
- Megumi Hayashibara
- Mamoru Hosoda
- Junko Iwao
- Mamoru Oshii
- Rodney Rothman
- Aya Suzuki
- Sadayuki Murai
- Masao Maruyama
- Masashi Ando
- Hiroyuki Okiura

== Reception ==
=== Critical response ===
On Rotten Tomatoes, the documentary holds an approval rating of 100% based on 15 reviews, with an average rating of 7.70/10.

Reviewing for Anime News Network, Alicia Haddick called it "a highly engaging documentary filled with high-profile interviews on an interesting subject". Richard Whittaker of Austin Chronicle commended Pascal-Alex Vincent for portraying the "complicated threads and fascinations that wove Kon's curtailed filmography", and described the film as "overdue tribute to one of the greats of animation". According to Courtney Small of POV Magazine, the film "works best when viewed as a tasty appetizer that whets one's appetite for diving into Kon's meaty canon of films". Film critic Reuben Baron of Comic Book Resources hailed the film as "a quality tribute" to the anime director.
