= With Love... from the Age of Reason =

- Theatrical release poster
- Directed by: Yann Samuell
- Written by: Yann Samuell
- Produced by: Christophe Rossignon
- Starring: Sophie Marceau; Marton Csokas; Michel Duchaussoy
- Cinematography: Antoine Roch
- Edited by: Andrea Sedlácková
- Music by: Cyrille Aufort
- Distributed by: Mars Distribution
- Release date: 28 July 2010 (France)
- Running time: 97 minutes
- Countries: France; Belgium
- Language: French
- Budget: €7.2 million
- Box office: $4.6 million

With Love... from the Age of Reason (French: L'Âge de raison) is a 2010 French romantic comedy film written and directed by Yann Samuell and starring Sophie Marceau, Marton Csokas, and Michel Duchaussoy. The film is about a beautiful and successful forty-year-old businesswoman who receives a letter that she wrote to herself when she was seven years old to remind her of the promises she made at that age, which is considered to be the age of reason in the Catholic tradition, and to remind her of what she wants to become.

== Plot ==
Margaret is a beautiful and successful businesswoman selling power plants to the Chinese. With an adoring English lover, she appears to have everything going for her. On her fortieth birthday, Margaret receives the first bundle of letters she wrote to herself when she was seven years old. A jumble of colourful collages, photographs, and wildly creative puzzles seem to have come from a different girl entirely. In a letter the seven-year-old Margaret writes, "Dear me. Today I am seven years old and I'm writing you this letter to help you remember the promises I made when I was 7, and also to remind you of what I want to become..." As her letters to herself keep arriving, Margaret finds herself becoming disenchanted. The letters evoke long-forgotten memories and cast doubt on many of the choices she made in her life. In many ways she's become the opposite of what she hoped to become as a child. Margaret visits her childhood village and, by reconnecting with people who see in her the girl they once knew, she starts finding her way to the woman she vowed to become.

== Cast ==
- Sophie Marceau as Margaret
- Marton Csokas as Malcolm
- Michel Duchaussoy as Mérignac
- Jonathan Zaccaï as Philibert
- Emmanuelle Grönvold as De Lorca
- Juliette Chappey as Marguerite
- Thierry Hancisse as Mathieu
- Roméo Lebeaut as Philibert (child)
- Jarod Legrand as Mathieu (child)
- Alexis Michalik as Margaret's assistant
- Raphaël Devedjian as Simon
- Christophe Rossignon as Huissier
- Mireille Séguret as Madame Vermier

== Production ==
Filming locations

- Cité Scolaire Internationale de Lyon, Lyon, Rhône, Rhône-Alpes, France
- Morocco
- Saou, Drôme, France
