= Belmont, Doubs =

Belmont
- Commune
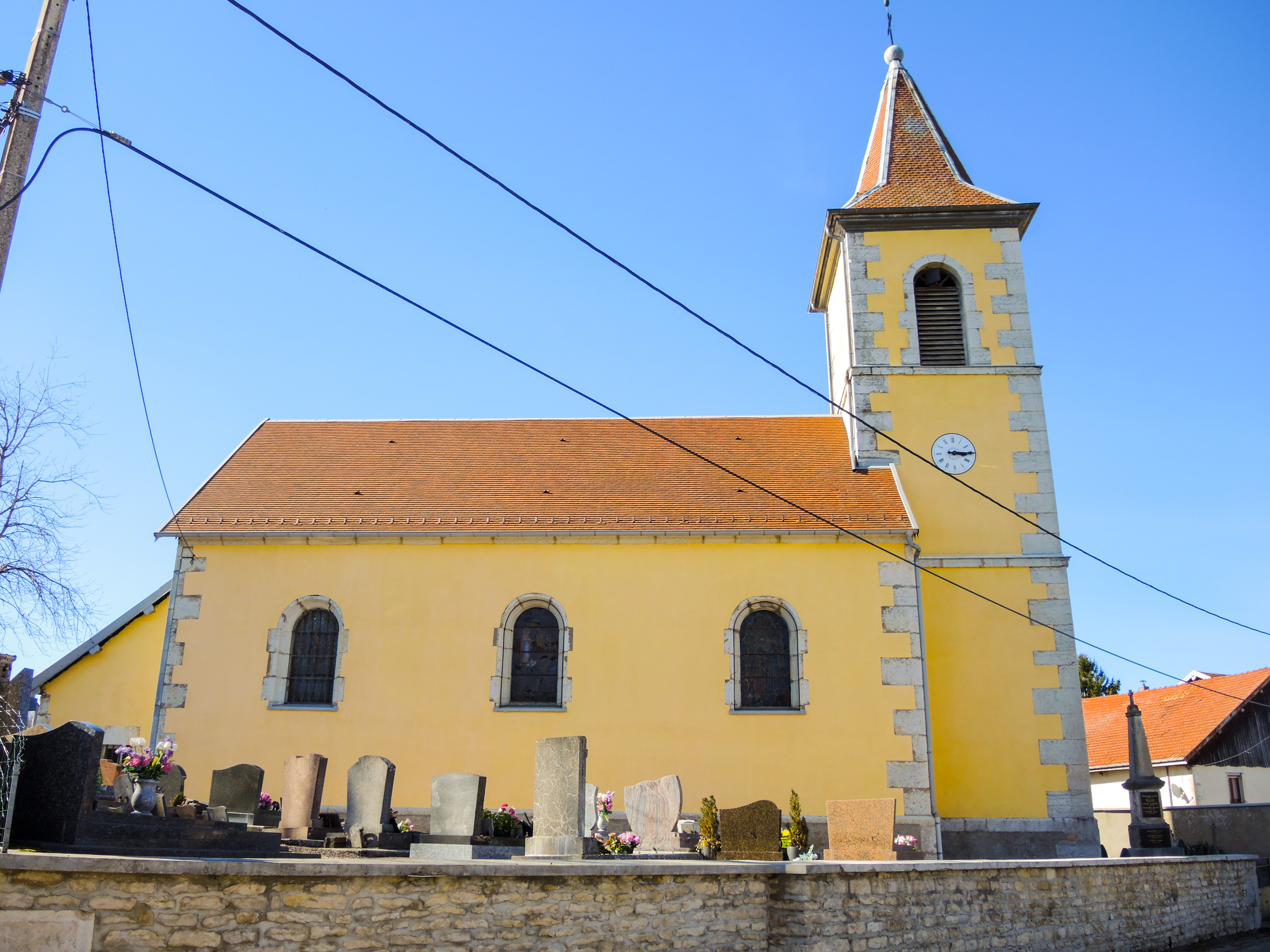
- The church in Belmont

- Coat of arms
- Location of Belmont
- Location within France Location within Bourgogne-Franche-Comté
- Coordinates: 47°13′18″N 6°22′02″E
- Country: France
- Region: Bourgogne-Franche-Comté
- Department: Doubs
- Arrondissement: Pontarlier
- Canton: Valdahon

Government
  - Mayor (2020–2026): Elisabeth Brossard
- Area^{1}: 4.72 km^{2} (1.82 sq mi)
- Elevation: 613 m (2,011 ft)
- Highest elevation: 633 m (2,077 ft)
- Lowest elevation: 535 m (1,755 ft)
- Population (2023): 79
  - Density: 17/km^{2} (43/sq mi)
- Time zone: UTC+01:00 (CET)
  - Summer (DST): UTC+02:00 (CEST)
- INSEE/Postal code: 25052 /25530
- ^{1} French Land Register data, which excludes lakes, ponds, glaciers > 1 km^{2} (0.386 sq mi or 247 acres) and river estuaries.

Belmont (French pronunciation: [bɛlmɔ̃]) is a commune in the Doubs department in the Bourgogne-Franche-Comté region in eastern France.

== Personalities ==
It is the birthplace of Louis Pergaud (1882–1915), writer and soldier.

== Population ==
Historical population
| Year | Pop. | ±% p.a. |
|---|---|---|
| 1968 | 52 | — |
| 1975 | 43 | −2.68% |
| 1982 | 49 | +1.88% |
| 1990 | 47 | −0.52% |
| 1999 | 60 | +2.75% |
| 2007 | 58 | −0.42% |
| 2012 | 64 | +1.99% |
| 2017 | 67 | +0.92% |
| 2023 | 79 | +2.78% |
Source: INSEE

== See also ==
- Communes of the Doubs department
