= Les Intrigantes =

1954 French film

- Directed by: Henri Decoin
- Written by: François Boyer; Henri Decoin; Jacques Robert
- Produced by: Memnon Films (France)
- Starring: Raymond Rouleau; Louis de Funès
- Music by: Georges Van Parys
- Distributed by: A.G.D.C.
- Release date: 7 April 1954 (France)
- Running time: 96 minutes
- Country: France
- Language: French

Les Intrigantes (English: The Plotters), is a French crime drama film from 1954, directed by Henri Decoin, written by François Boyer, starring Raymond Rouleau and Louis de Funès. It is based on the novel La Machination by Jacques Robert.

Paul Rémi, a well-known theater director, accused by Andrieux, his secretary. Advised by Mona, hiding in psychiatric hospital.

== Cast ==
- Raymond Rouleau : Paul Rémi, the director of theatre
- Jeanne Moreau : Mona Rémi, wife of Paul
- Raymond Pellegrin : Mr Andrieux, secretary of Paul
- Etchika Choureau : Marie, the dactylo of the troops
- Jacques Charon : Antonio Pan, the first young person
- Marcel André : the inspector Gosset
- Jacqueline Maillan : a dancer
- Robert Hirsch : Mickaël Pakévitch, the movie director
- Claude Borelli : Jany Noël, the starlet
- Louis de Funès : Mr Marcange, author of pièce
