= Michel Duchaussoy =

French actor

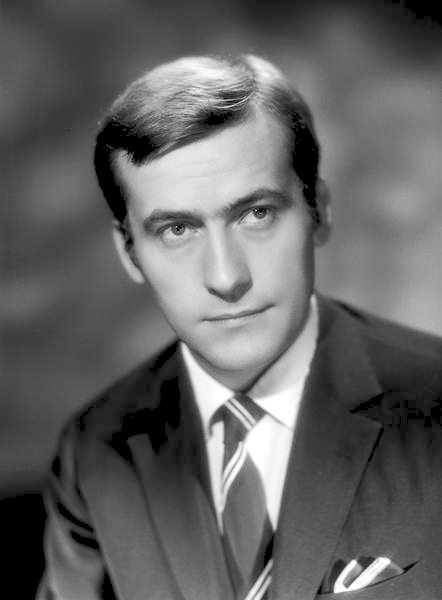
- Duchaussoy in 1964
- Born: 29 November 1938; Valenciennes, France
- Died: 13 March 2012 (aged 73); Paris, France
- Occupation: Actor
- Years active: 1962–2012

Michel René Jacques Duchaussoy (29 November 1938 – 13 March 2012) was a French film actor, who appeared in more than 130 films between 1962 and 2012. At first a theatre actor, he worked for many years in the Comédie Française, where he started his career in 1964.

Duchaussoy performed in many French classic plays including those by Molière, Marivaux, Corneille and Ionesco. He received the prestigious Molière award for best supporting actor in 2003. The deep-voiced actor dubbed Marlon Brando in the French version of Francis Ford Coppola's The Godfather. In 2010 he co-starred with Sophie Marceau in Yann Samuell's L’age de raison.

== Selected filmography ==
- The Killing Game (1967)
- The Unfaithful Wife (1968)
- This Man Must Die (1969)
- Bye bye, Barbara (1969)
- Just Before Nightfall (1971)
- Man with the Transplanted Brain (1972)
- Nada (1974)
- Man in a Hurry (1977)
- Fort Saganne (1984)
- Life and Nothing But (1989)
- May Fools (1990)
- The Widow of Saint-Pierre (2000)
- Amen. (2002)
- Intimate Strangers (2004)
- La Boîte noire (2005)
- Poltergay (2006)
- Mesrine (2008)
- Hidden Diary (2009)
- Le Petit Nicolas (2009)
- L'Autre Dumas (2010)
- L'âge de raison (2010)
- Sarah's Key (2010)
- The Other Side of the Wind (2018) (posthumous)
