= Spider Smile =

Studio album by Tarwater
- Released: May 2007
- Genre: electronic music

Tarwater chronology
The Needle Was Traveling (2005)	Spider Smile (2007)	Inside the Ships (2011)

Spider Smile is the seventh full-length release by Tarwater, an electronic music group from Berlin, Germany. The album was released in May 2007.

== Track listing ==
1. "Shirley Temple"
2. "World of Things to Touch"
3. "Witchpark"
4. "A Marriage in Belmont"
5. "Lower Manhattan Pantoum"
6. "Roderick Usher"
7. "Arkestra"
8. "When Love Was the Law in Los Angeles"
9. "Easy Sermon "
10. "Sweethome Under White Clouds"
11. "When Tomorrow Comes"
