= The Wolf's Call =

2019 film directed by Antonin Baudry

- French theatrical release poster
- French: Le chant du loup
- Directed by: Antonin Baudry
- Written by: Antonin Baudry
- Produced by: Jérôme Seydoux; Alain Attal; Hugo Sélignac
- Starring: François Civil; Omar Sy; Mathieu Kassovitz; Reda Kateb; Paula Beer; Alexis Michalik; Jean-Yves Berteloot; Damien Bonnard
- Cinematography: Pierre Cottereau
- Edited by: Nassim Gordji Tehrani; Saar Klein
- Music by: Tomandandy
- Production companies: Pathé; Trésor Films; Chi-Fou-Mi Productions; Les Productions Jouror
- Distributed by: Pathé
- Release date: 20 February 2019 (France)
- Running time: 116 minutes
- Country: France
- Language: French
- Budget: €20 million
- Box office: US$12.6 million

The Wolf's Call (French: Le Chant du loup) is a 2019 French action thriller film written and directed by Antonin Baudry in his feature film directorial debut. The film is about a submarine's sonar operator, Chanteraide (François Civil), who must use his brilliant sense of hearing to track down a French ballistic missile submarine and end the threat of nuclear war.

The film was released theatrically in France by Pathé on 20 February 2019. Netflix acquired distribution rights for North America, Latin America, Spain and Scandinavia, where the film was released in Summer 2019.

== Plot ==
The French Rubis-class nuclear attack submarine Titane (Titanium) in the original French version – is sent near the Mediterranean coast of Tartus, Syria to stealthily recover a French Special Forces unit operating in the area. The submarine sails under the command of Captain Grandchamp and Executive Officer (XO) D'Orsi. However, during their mission they encounter an unidentified sonar contact. The sonar expert of the submarine, Chanteraide – nicknamed "Socks", and serving as "golden ear", the officer specialized in underwater acoustics – first classifies the contact as a wounded whale, but it quickly turns out that the contact is an unknown submarine transmitting their position to an Iranian frigate and a maritime helicopter operating in the area. The helicopter launches depth charges in what seems to be an unprovoked act of aggression which, however, is a valid defensive measure as the Titan is in fact violating sovereign Syrian waters while recovering a foreign force that has already engaged in combat and killed Syrian nationals, which can also be considered justified intervention against a dictatorship in an ongoing civil war. After evading the barrage, the Titan surfaces, and the captain shoots down the helicopter with a Panzerfaust 3. They recover the Special Forces unit and return to base.

When the Titan returns to base, the radio announces that Russia is invading Finland's Åland Islands, and that the French President has decided to send a naval task force to the Baltic Sea in support of Finland. The Russian government then threatens nuclear retaliation against the French Republic. Chanteraide, trying to identify the unknown contact in Syria, hacks into his superior officer's computer and after conducting research at a bookstore where he starts a romantic relationship with Diane, as well as the naval archives, discovers that it is in fact a Russian Timour III ballistic missile submarine, supposedly dismantled. Meanwhile, Grandchamp is promoted for his actions to command the Triomphant-class nuclear ballistic missile submarine SSBN L'Effroyable (Dreadful) in the original French version – while D'Orsi takes over command of Titan.

During a test the day before the mission, Chanteraide, along with ALFOST and CIRA, also analyzed the spectrum of Russian, British and American submarines, as well as the sound spectrum of another Triomphant-class nuclear submarine, the SSBN L'implacable (Unbeatable) - in the original French version, which had been built together with L'Effroyable. By comparing the recordings from both submarines, Chanteraide finds that the L'Effroyable's reactor was re-machined after an incident.

The L'Effroyable is launched with its new captain and the Titane as its escort submarine. Chanteraide is pulled aside during roll call and Grandchamp explains he has failed his drug test and will not be boarding the submarine. Chanteraide distresses at the now empty dock but after an air raid siren sounds, runs into the bunker where the naval staff have relocated. The French military command detects a Russian R-30 nuclear missile being launched by the Timour III from the Bering Sea, prompting the French President to order the L'Effroyable to launch one of its nuclear missiles against Russia in response.

In the command bunker, Chanteraide finds an anomaly while listening to the recording of the launch - the missile sounds too light, because it was launched without a nuclear warhead. Chanteraide and his superior officer, the admiral in command of the Strategic Oceanic Force (the ALFOST) immediately call the Chief of Staff, but the Chief of Staff puts them on hold as the US Secretary of State has also called. The Secretary of State reveals critical intelligence that the terrorist organisation Al-Jadida had illegally bought the decommissioned Timour III submarine from a corrupt admiral and launched an empty missile at France, tricking the French into an irrevocable procedure to launch a nuclear counterstrike from the L'Effroyable. The ALFOST and Chanteraide are then flown by helicopter to the Titan in an attempt to stop the nuclear launch by all means necessary.

Grandchamp prepares to fire the nuclear missile, following procedure and eliminating all outside communication while keeping the submarine in stealth mode. After D'Orsi is rebuffed in his efforts to communicate with Grandchamp via underwater telephone, he attempts to approach L'Effroyable by swimming to it in person. He is killed when Grandchamp launches a torpedo at Titan to prevent their attempts to foil his missile launch. This torpedo grazes the Titan and only causes minor damage. Titan then launches its own torpedo at L'Effroyable. L'Effroyable then returns fire. While Chanteraide breaks down under the pressure of targeting his former commander, the ALFOST is able to use his experience from formerly commanding L'Effroyable to predict Grandchamp's evasive actions. Titan's torpedo explodes above the L'Effroyable's bridge, as Grandchamp is able to release ballast air and throw the torpedo enough off target to prevent direct impact, although the control room is devastated. L'Effroyable's torpedo hits Titan which begins to sink.

Grandchamp orders the evacuation of the carbon monoxide filled control room and denies appeals to issue an SOS call, intending to follow orders and launch the nuclear missile first. On the Titane, Chanteraide and the ALFOST, the sole survivors of the torpedo impact, escape the burning area of the ship, Chanteraide makes a last call to the L'Effroyable over an underwater telephone. Chanteraide recalls Grandchamp's prior trust in him, and begs him not to fire the missile, before saying goodbye in the face of his impending death on the stricken Titan. With his dying breath, Grandchamp removes the nuclear targeting board, preventing the missile from being launched. The ALFOST is able to evacuate Chanteraide via the escape hatch, but is unable to evacuate himself. As Chanteraide surfaces in a lifejacket, his eardrums are destroyed. Chanteraide is rescued by a helicopter. A deaf Chanteraide attends a memorial held on a submarine for the fallen French sailors. The final scene shows Chanteraide reuniting with his girlfriend Diane.

== Cast ==
- François Civil as Chanteraide/"Socks"
- Omar Sy as Official D'Orsi, former Executive Officer of SSN Titane and later Captain of SSN Titane
- Mathieu Kassovitz as the Admiral (ALFOST (Note: "ALFOST" is not a name. It is an acronym designating the admiral commanding the SSBN fleet of the French Navy. It stands for AmiraL commandant la Force Océanique STratégique (Admiral commanding the Strategic Oceanic Force).))
- Reda Kateb as Official Grandchamp, former Captain of SSN Titane and later Captain of SSBN Formidable
- Paula Beer as Diane, Chanteraide´s girlfriend
- Alexis Michalik as Executive Officer of the SSBN Formidable
- Jean-Yves Berteloot as CIRA Commander
- Damien Bonnard as Navigator of the SSBN Formidable
- Marc Ruchmann as CODET (COB) of the SSBN Formidable
- Paulo Granier as Navigator of the SSN Titane
- Simon Thomas as Helmsman of the SSN Titane
- Sébastien Libessart as CODET (COB) of the SSN Titane

== Production ==
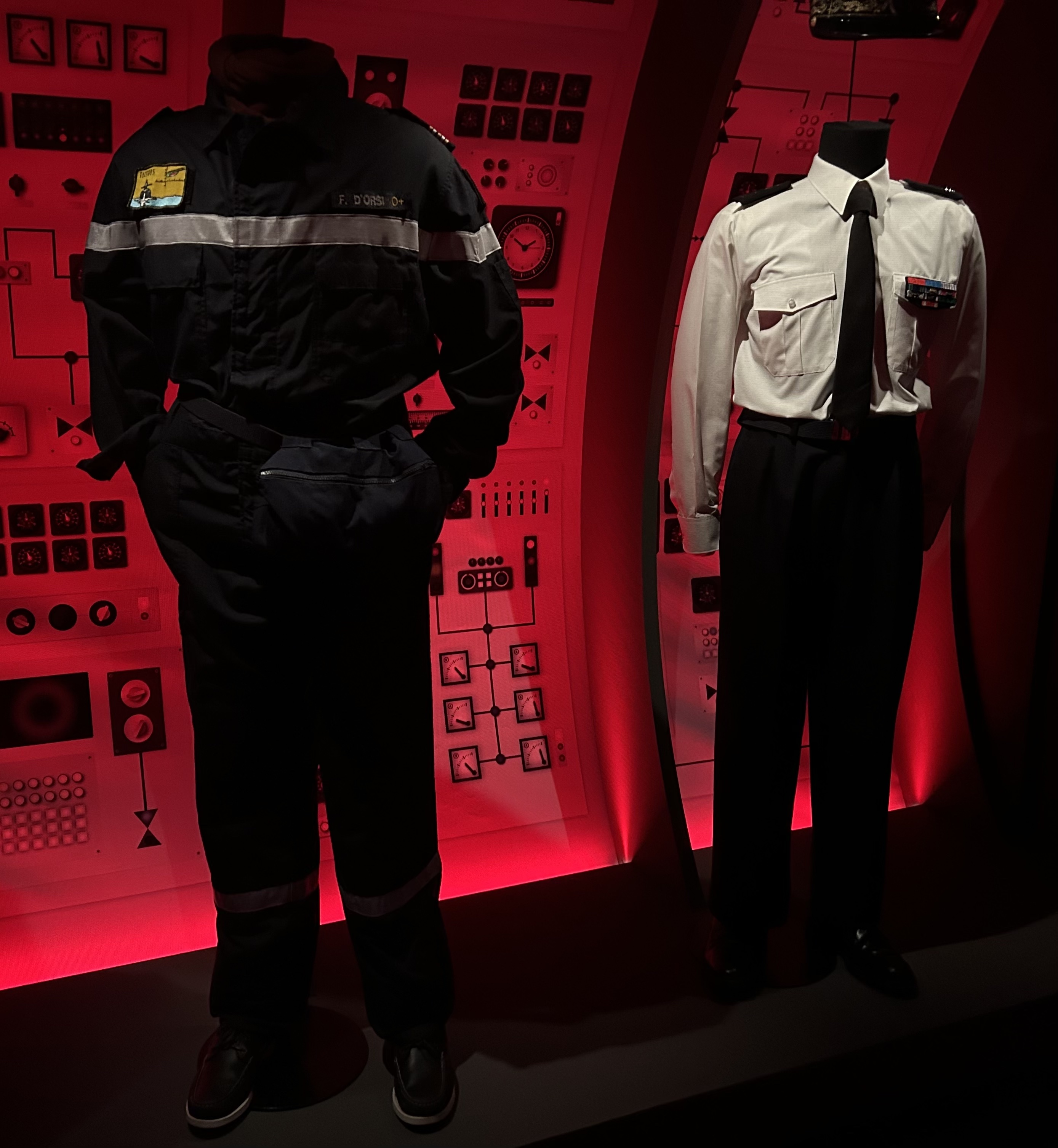
Costumes worn by Omar Sy and Mathieu Kassovitz in their roles of Commander D'Orsi and the Admiral

The Wolf's Call was inspired by director Antonin Baudry's real life experiences as a diplomat, advisor and speechwriter for France's former Foreign Minister, Dominique de Villepin. Baudry spent a month observing a real French military submarine to make the film credible.

Baudry said of the film:

I wanted to draw inspiration from real life instead of adopting the codes of a preestablished genre. I did not base my work on other submarine movies. Most of them are American, and yet in France we have also been confronted with issues of nuclear power and dissuasion. We also have a fleet of submarines, and what I observed does not correspond to what you see in U.S. movies. I therefore decided to only draw inspiration from what I saw and felt – even though there are submarine films I love, such as Das Boot and The Hunt for Red October.

=== Filming ===
Principal photography began on 24 July 2017 and wrapped on 20 October 2017. Filming took place in Toulon, then in the Giens Peninsula and the Levant Island, at the DGA Essais de missiles in the Var department in Brest, and in Paris.

Some scenes in the film were shot on actual French submarines.

== Release ==
The film was released theatrically in France by Pathé on 20 February 2019. Netflix bought the distribution rights for North America, Latin America, Spain and Scandinavia, where the film was released in Summer 2019.

== Reception ==
=== Critical response ===
The reviewer Anthony Kao from Cinema Escapist states that the film's military sequences depict a "more muscular France" with "French hard power" acting as part of a "more militarily assertive Europe", noting that these political storylines are influenced by director Antonin Baudry having "previously served as a high-ranking French diplomat." Kao states that even though the film has an "... ambitious plot that spans multiple vessels, naval bases, and countries, it never gets weighed down or overly hard to follow", which contrasts with the typical French art film that North American audiences associate with that country, which is usually "esoteric and inaccessible."

Reviewer Brenden Gallagher from The Daily Dot calls the film "tense submarine warfare for Tom Clancy fans", a reference to Clancy's submarine classic The Hunt for the Red October. Gallagher calls The Wolf's Call "... pulse-pounding action and military intrigue on a level you just don’t see from Hollywood filmmaking anymore" that is, while being "familiar and predictable", still a "well-constructed" movie. He states that while the film's $22 million production budget is much lower than a similar US film would get, the French film does well within its budgetary constraints.

On review aggregator Rotten Tomatoes, the film holds an approval rating of 92% based on 12 reviews, with an average rating of 6.1/10. The site's critical consensus reads, "The Wolf's Call is a classic submarine action-thriller that will keep you on the edge of your seat."

=== Box office ===
The film debuted at number 5 at the French box office and sold over 1.5 million tickets in France. It grossed US$12.6 million worldwide.
