= André Montagard =

French songwriter and poet

André Marius Montagard
- Born: 1888
- Died: 28 February 1963 (aged 74–75)
- Occupations: Songwriter, poet

André Montagard (French pronunciation: [ɑ̃dʁe mɔ̃taɡaʁ]; 1888 – 28 February 1963) was a French songwriter and poet. He wrote the lyrics to several songs, including Maréchal, nous voilà !, one of the unofficial national anthems during Vichy France. He published four poetry collections about Provence in the 1950s and 1960s.

== Early life ==
André Montagard was born in 1888.

== Career ==
Montagard wrote the lyrics to Une partie de pétanque in 1937; it was re-edited in 1941. It was sung by Darcelys.

Montagard wrote the lyrics to Maréchal, nous voilà ! while Charles Cortioux composed the music. The song became one of the national anthems alongside La Marseillaise during Vichy France. However, Montagnard and Courtioux actually plagiarized another song composed by Polish Jewish composer and future Holocaust victim Kazimierz Oberfeld, "La Margoton du bataillon".

Montagard also wrote the lyrics to La France de demain, another Vichy-inspired song composed by Cortioux. It was used in the antisemitic and anti-American short film Les Corrupteurs, directed by Pierre Ramelot in 1941.

Montagard wrote the lyrics to the hymn for Pierre Poujade's Union for the Defense of Tradesmen and Artisans in 1955.

Montagard published four poetry collections about Provence in the 1950s and 1960s.

== Death ==
Montagard died on 28 February 1963.

== Works ==
- Montagard, André (1953). Camargue. Marseille: Éditions Bendor. OCLC 6698837.
- Montagard, André (1960). Ma Provence et mes santons. Marseille: Éditions Bendor. OCLC 5981612.
- Montagard, André (1962). La Fiesta du sang. Marseille: Éditions Bendor. OCLC 6698717.
- Montagard, André (1965). Anis, esprit de joie et de santé. Marseille: Éditions Bendor. OCLC 6698679.
