= Silur =

Studio album by Tarwater
- Released: 1998
- Genre: Indietronica

Tarwater chronology
Rabbit Moon (1997)	Silur (1998)	Animals Suns & Atoms (2000)

Silur is the second full-length release by Tarwater, an electronic music group from Berlin, Germany. The album debuted on September 28, 1998. The album combines spartan spoken-word narration with ambient, electronic music. The music mainly consists of looped samples layered with live instruments. The instruments used were not those commonly found in pop-rock music. For example, the flute is used throughout the album.

The album received some criticism for failing to maintain a consistent tone. The first five songs feature a slow, deliberate, almost ethereal tone. The mood is interrupted by the sixth song, "No More Extra Time," an up-tempo synth-pop song. The album's seventh song reverts to the mood of the first five; however, subsequent songs are progressively more pop-like than ambient.

== Track listing ==
1. "Visit"
2. "To Moauf"
3. "The Watersample"
4. "Seafrance Cezanne"
5. "Silur"
6. "No More Extra Time"
7. "Otomo"
8. "Ford"
9. "The Pomps of the Subsoil"
10. "20 Miles Up"
11. "To Describe You"
12. "Chaos"
