= Landresse =

- Commune
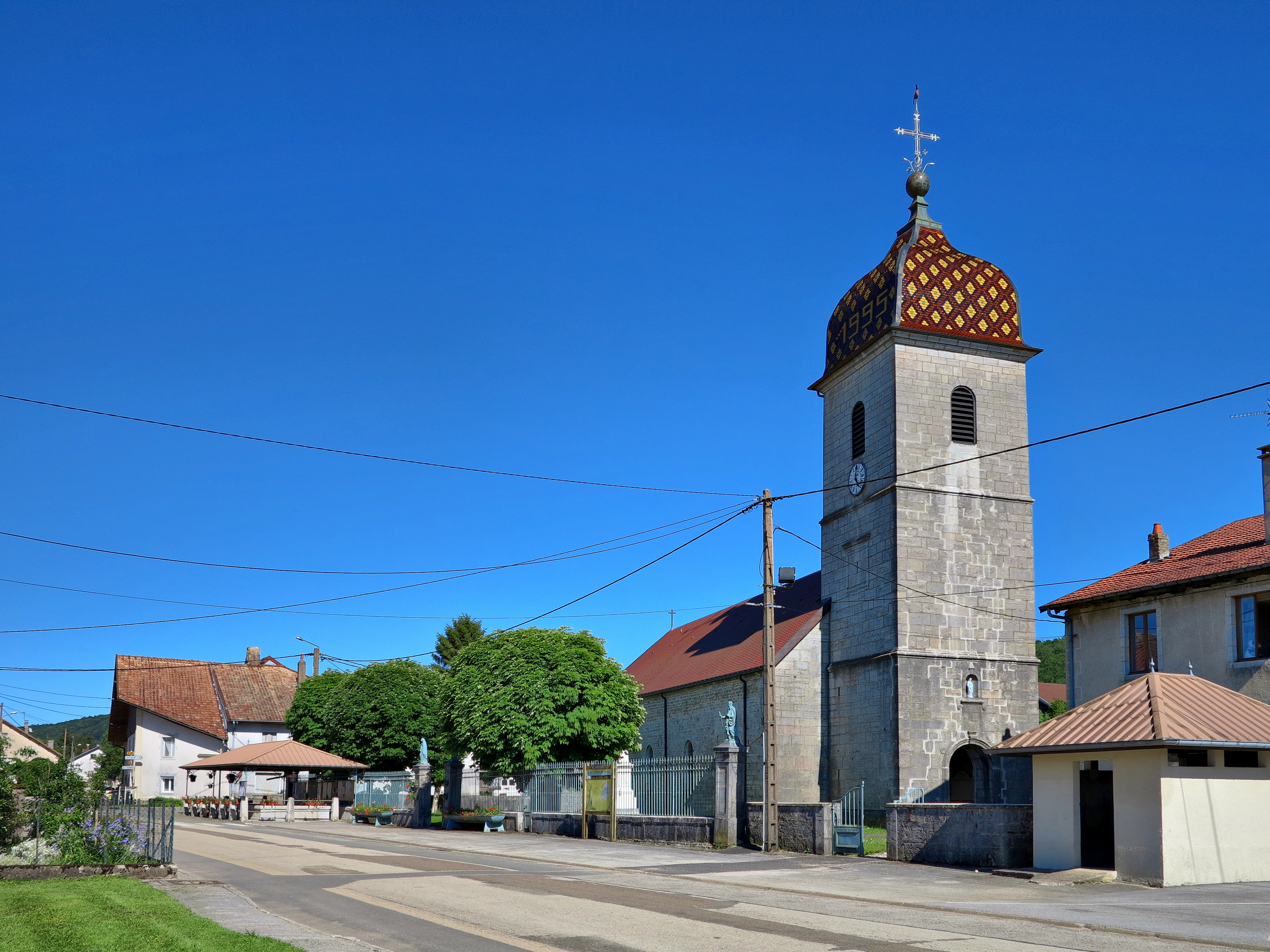
- The church in Landresse
- Location of Landresse
- Location within France Location within Bourgogne-Franche-Comté
- Coordinates: 47°15′28″N 6°28′13″E
- Country: France
- Region: Bourgogne-Franche-Comté
- Department: Doubs
- Arrondissement: Pontarlier
- Canton: Valdahon

Government
  - Mayor (2020–2026): Michel Devillers
- Area^{1}: 14.43 km^{2} (5.57 sq mi)
- Elevation: 575 m (1,886 ft)
- Highest elevation: 853 m (2,799 ft)
- Lowest elevation: 556 m (1,824 ft)
- Population (2023): 236
  - Density: 16.4/km^{2} (42.4/sq mi)
- Time zone: UTC+01:00 (CET)
  - Summer (DST): UTC+02:00 (CEST)
- INSEE/Postal code: 25325 /25530
- ^{1} French Land Register data, which excludes lakes, ponds, glaciers > 1 km^{2} (0.386 sq mi or 247 acres) and river estuaries.

Landresse (French pronunciation: [lɑ̃dʁɛs]) is a commune in the Doubs department in the Bourgogne-Franche-Comté region in eastern France.

== Geography ==
The commune is located 9 km (5.6 mi) northeast of Pierrefontaine.

== Population ==
Historical population
Year	Pop.	±% p.a.
1968	216	—
1975	164	−3.86%
1982	143	−1.94%
1990	144	+0.09%
1999	148	+0.30%
2007	195	+3.51%
2012	231	+3.45%
2017	233	+0.17%
2023	236	+0.21%
Source: INSEE

== Notable people linked to the commune ==
- Louis Pergaud, writer and author of La Guerre des boutons, was a teacher there
- Jean Perrot (1920–2012), archaeologist, born in Landresse

== See also ==
- Communes of the Doubs department
