= Gregg Fitzgerald =

Irish actor

Greg Fitzgerald (born 1 September 1978) is an Irish actor, who appeared in a number of films in the 1990s including War of the Buttons (1994), The Butcher Boy (1998), and One Man's Hero, (1999). Fitzgerald's theatre appearances include a lead role in Gary Mitchell's 1999 play Trust.

== Filmography ==
- War of the Buttons (1994)
- A Soldier's Song (short 1997)
- The Butcher Boy (1997)
- EastEnders (TV series, 1997)
- Le frère Irlandais (TV movie, 1999)
- One Man's Hero (1999)
