= Christophe Blain =

French comics artist

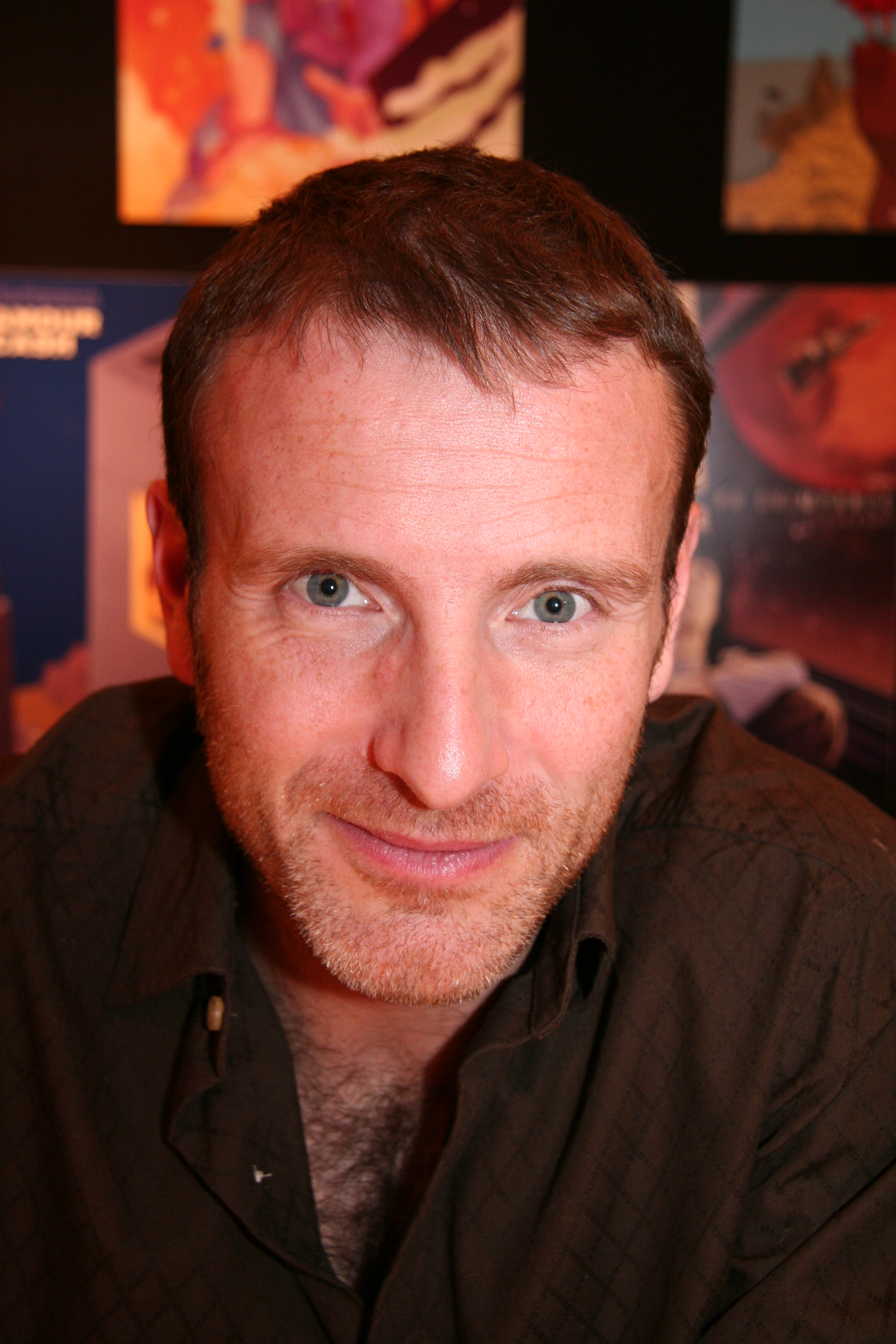
Blain (2008)

Christophe Blain (born 10 August 1970) is a French comic book author.

== Life and career ==
Blain was born in Gennevilliers. He studied visual arts in Cherbourg and began drawing comics during his military service, first published by Albin Michel in 1994. He subsequently worked as an illustrator for various magazines before returning to drawing comics, inspired by David B., Lewis Trondheim and Joann Sfar. He created with David B. some stories that appeared in the magazine Lapin.

He began collaborating with Trondheim and Sfar in 1999 for the Dungeon series album Dungeon: Early Years. He began his most successful series to date, Isaac the Pirate, in 2001. In the story, set in the 18th century, Isaac Sofer, a penniless painter, becomes a pirate when he accepts a commission involving a rather involuntary sea crossing to America. The subsequent series, Gus, is a Western comic that humorously recounts episodes from the life of Gus, a mail robber. With its exaggerated drawings, the comic forms a link between the classics Lucky Luke and Blueberry.

His award-winning comic Quai d'Orsay (Weapons of Mass Diplomacy, in the English version) about the supposed daily routine at the French Foreign Ministry, was made into a film by Bertrand Tavernier in 2013.

In 2021 he drew the comic Le Monde sans fin (World Without End), about climate change, written by Jean-Marc Jancovici.

== Awards ==
In 2000, the book he drew, Les Ogres (written by David B.), was awarded the Prix international de la Ville de Genève pour la bande dessinée. In 2002, he received the Angoulême International Comics Festival Prize for Best Album for Isaac the Pirate and again in 2013, together with Abel Lanzac, for the second volume of Quai d'Orsay: Chroniques diplomatiques. In 2009, Gus and his Gang was awarded the Harvey Award for Best American Edition of Foreign Material.
