= Dweller at the Threshold =

- Origin: Portland, Oregon, United States
- Genres: Berlin School of electronic music New-age music
- Years active: 1993–2005
- Labels: Hypnos; Eurock; Quantum
- Past members: Paul Ellis; Dave Fulton; John Duval
- Website: www.dattonline.com

Dweller at the Threshold (DATT) was an electronic music band based in Portland, Oregon, United States from 1993 to 2005. The band lineup changed through the years but primarily consisted of Paul Ellis and Dave Fulton. Ellis left the band sometime after the third CD, Ouroborus, was released. 2004 saw the release of Full Boundary Condition and Passenger 4. The former was a 3 disk box set that contained the first 2 DATT CDs remastered and a third disk of a live performance of the band after Ouroborus was released, while the latter was a collaborative effort with the Dutch group Free System Projekt.

Dweller at the Threshold was one of the few US based electronic music bands to have performed in the Berlin School style of electronic music. The band has performed internationally at electronic music festivals and on both the east and west coasts of the United States. DATT has received national airplay on PRI's Echoes, XM radio, Hearts of Space.

Dave Fulton continued on with John Duval and played several live shows through 2005.

Currently there are no concrete plans to record again as DATT.

As of April 4/14/2012 Dave Fulton announced there will be another Dweller release with Giles Reaves as a full member. Album should be finished by the summer of 2012. This has been canceled and the material used in a future non DATT project.

== Members after leaving ==
Paul Ellis has released several solo CDs and has worked with other electronic and acoustic musicians such as Steve Roach and Rudy Adrian. Paul Ellis continues to record and release music in 2007.

Dave Fulton is working with Giles Reaves on a collaborative project called "The Range". It was released in April 2007. Also a rock project with Cord Amato (of PDX group Wow & Flutter) and Weigh Brown has been mixed and is slated for release in the winter of 2007. Dave Fulton is in a Krautrock project known as Møtrik and has released 1 LP and a special EP called 33. Møtrik is currently working on a 2nd LP and plays shows throughout the NW.

Jess Fry has been added as a full-time member after the spring and summer tours of the Dave Fulton/Giles Reaves Project. A new band name is being considered.

== Discography ==
- No Boundary Condition (1996) Eurock ECD2013
- Generation, Transmission, Illumination (1998) Eurock ECD2015
- Ouroborus
- Full Boundary Condition

== See also ==
- Electronic music
- New-age music
