= Ocha la Rocha =

- Origin: Atlanta, Georgia, U.S.
- Genres: Rock; Country; Alternative rock
- Years active: 2004–present
- Labels: U & L Records, Inc
- Members: Johnny la Rocha
- Website: http://www.myspace.com/ochalarocha

Ocha la Rocha is an American alternative rock band based in Atlanta, Georgia, United States. In 2005, their first album, Ocha Lives, was recorded and highlights the band's original rock-country sound. Johnny la Rocha's voice and song-writing has become a staple in the south.

== History ==
Ocha la Rocha was founded by Johnny la Rocha in 2004. In 2005, Johnny met Ronney D and they evolved into a live act that debuted in Atlanta, GA at New Street Gallery. After going through a string of drummers, the original lineup became Johnny, Ronney and Satchel Mallon, whose presences are made known on the Ocha Lives Album.

In 2010, the band completed their second release (EP) Stealing Time with James Barber, a record producer of such artists as Ryan Adams, Courtney Love, & Andy Zipf. Stealing Time is scheduled for an early 2010 release.

Their music has been featured in Gold Circle Films My Sassy Girl (2008 film), Hot Tub Time Machine, Going the Distance and such television as Dirty Sexy Money, America's Funniest Home Videos a Burger King advertisement, ABC Family's Greek, LA Ink, Life Unexpected, Cougar Town, and The Middle.

Their debut record Ocha Lives wauus re-released in early 2010 because of the band's success. It was produced by Kristofer Sampson at Nickel and Dime Studios in Atlanta.

== Members ==
- Johnny la Rocha - Guitars, Vocals
- Ronney Danger - Bass
- Milton Chapman - Keys
- Anna Kramer - Guitar, Vocals
- Taylor Crowell - Guitar
- Justin Minchew - Bass
- Chandler Rentz - Drums
- Satchel Mallon - Drums
- Ryan Pitchford - Pedal Steel

== Supplemental musicians ==
- William Brandon
- Jason Anchando
- Marcos Diableros
- Page Waldrop
- Kristofer Sampson
- Noah Pine

== Releases ==
=== Albums ===
- Ocha Lives - 2007
- Stealing Time - 2010
- Ocha Scores - 2013
