= Marchéville-en-Woëvre =

- Commune
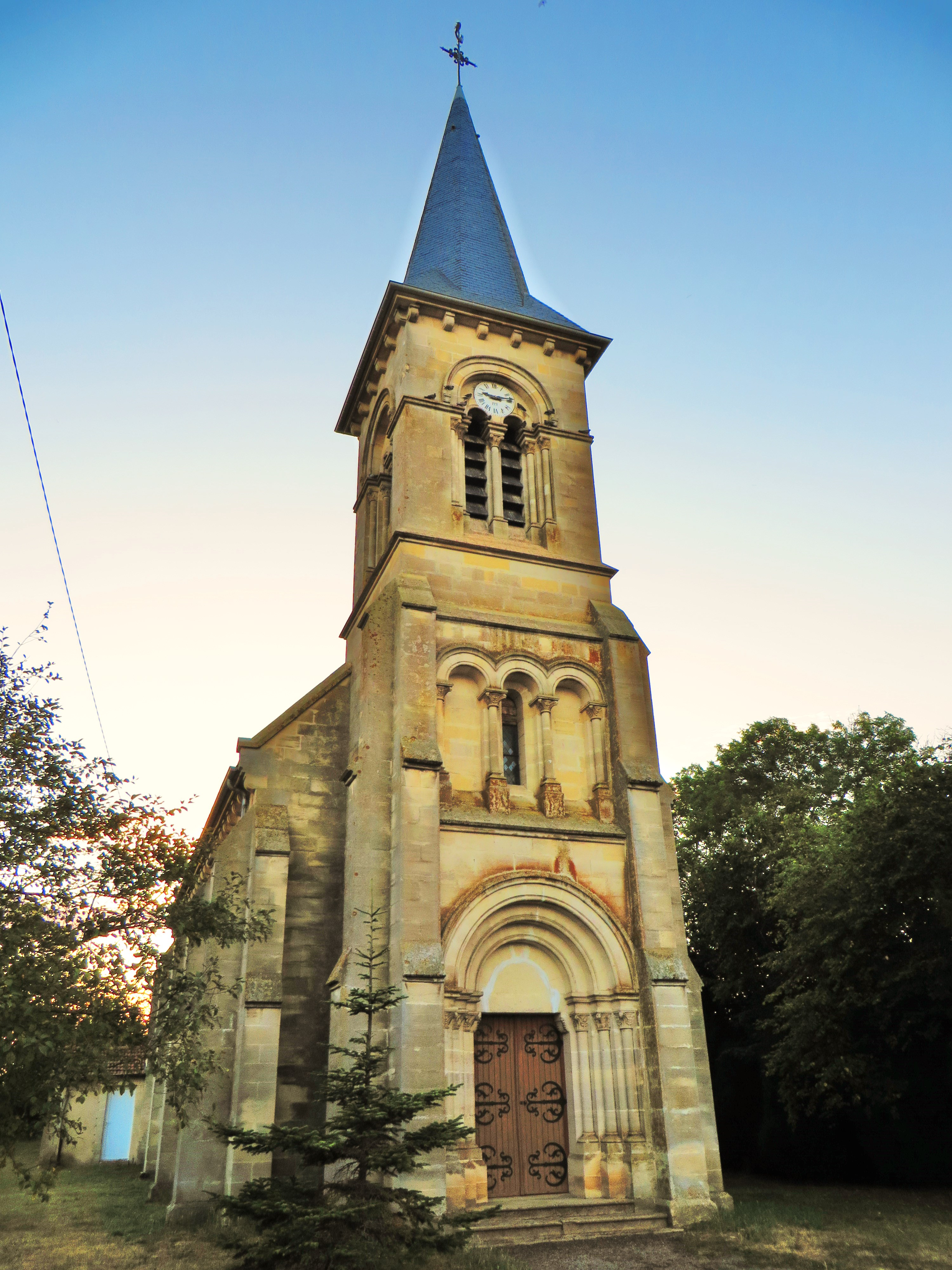
- The church in Marchéville-en-Woëvre

- Coat of arms
- Location of Marchéville-en-Woëvre
- Location within France Location within Grand Est
- Coordinates: 49°05′25″N 5°40′56″E
- Country: France
- Region: Grand Est
- Department: Meuse
- Arrondissement: Verdun
- Canton: Étain

Government
  - Mayor (2020–2026): Anne Corcellut
- Area^{1}: 5.63 km^{2} (2.17 sq mi)
- Elevation: 218 m (715 ft)
- Highest elevation: 225 m (738 ft)
- Lowest elevation: 207 m (679 ft)
- Population (2023): 69
  - Density: 12/km^{2} (32/sq mi)
- Time zone: UTC+01:00 (CET)
  - Summer (DST): UTC+02:00 (CEST)
- INSEE/Postal code: 55320 /55160
- ^{1} French Land Register data, which excludes lakes, ponds, glaciers > 1 km^{2} (0.386 sq mi or 247 acres) and river estuaries.

Marchéville-en-Woëvre (French pronunciation: [maʁʃevil ɑ̃ wavʁ]) is a commune in the Meuse department in Grand Est in north-eastern France.

== See also ==
- Communes of the Meuse department
