= Antonin Baudry =

French diplomat, writer and director (born 1975)

Baudry in 2026

Antonin Baudry (French pronunciation: [ɑ̃tɔnɛ̃ bodʁi]; born 6 May 1975) is a French film director, screenwriter, and comic book author.

== Biography ==
After finishing his studies at the Lycée Louis-le-Grand, Antonin Baudry began at the École polytechnique in 1994, graduating as an engineer of bridges, water and forest. He graduated second in literature from École normale supérieure in Paris in 1998. and obtained a Diplôme d'études approfondies (DEA) in cinematography.

In April 2004, he became an adviser to Minister Dominique de Villepin at the Ministry of the Interior.

From 2010 to 2014, he was the cultural counsellor at the French Embassy in Washington, DC, United States and counsellor for cooperation and cultural action at the French Embassy in Madrid, Spain.

Under the pseudonym Abel Lanzac, he used his diplomatic experience to help him write the comic book Quai d'Orsay (2010-2011), in collaboration with Christophe Blain. After the second comic book in this series won the prix du meilleur album at the festival d'Angoulême 2013, he revealed his true identity.

In 2014, he founded Albertine, the only French-language bookstore in New York. Named for the mysterious beloved in Marcel Proust's novel In Search of Lost Time, the bookstore shares the Payne Whitney House with the Cultural Services arm of the French embassy.

On 28 January 2015 Baudry was appointed as Ambassador for French Culture at the Institut français. He resigned after a few months to work on personal projects.

He was president of the jury for the 43rd Festival international de la bande dessinée in January 2016.

In 2019, he directed his first film, The Wolf's Call (Le Chant du loup), a submarine thriller. His two-part biopic of Charles de Gaulle filmed in 2023 and 2024. It premiered at the 2026 Cannes Film Festival.

== Filmography ==
=== Feature films ===
Year	English title	Original title	Notes
2019	The Wolf's Call	Le Chant du loup	
2026	De Gaulle	La Bataille de Gaulle	Two-part film

==== Only writer ====
Year	English title	Original title
2013	The French Minister	Quai d'Orsay

== Work ==
=== Comic books ===
- Quai d'Orsay, with Christophe Blain, Dargaud, 2 vol., 2010-2011. ISBN 978-2205-06132-1

=== Games ===
- La Course à l’Élysée, drawn by Christophe Blain, Letheia, 2012.

== Prizes ==
- 2010:
  - Grand Prix RTL de la bande dessinée for Quai d'Orsay: Chroniques diplomatiques (with Christophe Blain)
  - Prix Saint-Michel for Quai d'Orsay: Chroniques diplomatiques (with Christophe Blain)
- 2013:
  - Prix Micheluzzi for Quai d'Orsay t. 2 (with Christophe Blain)

== Honours ==
- Officer of the Ordre des Arts et des Lettres (2022)
