= Pascal-Alex Vincent =

French film director and screenwriter

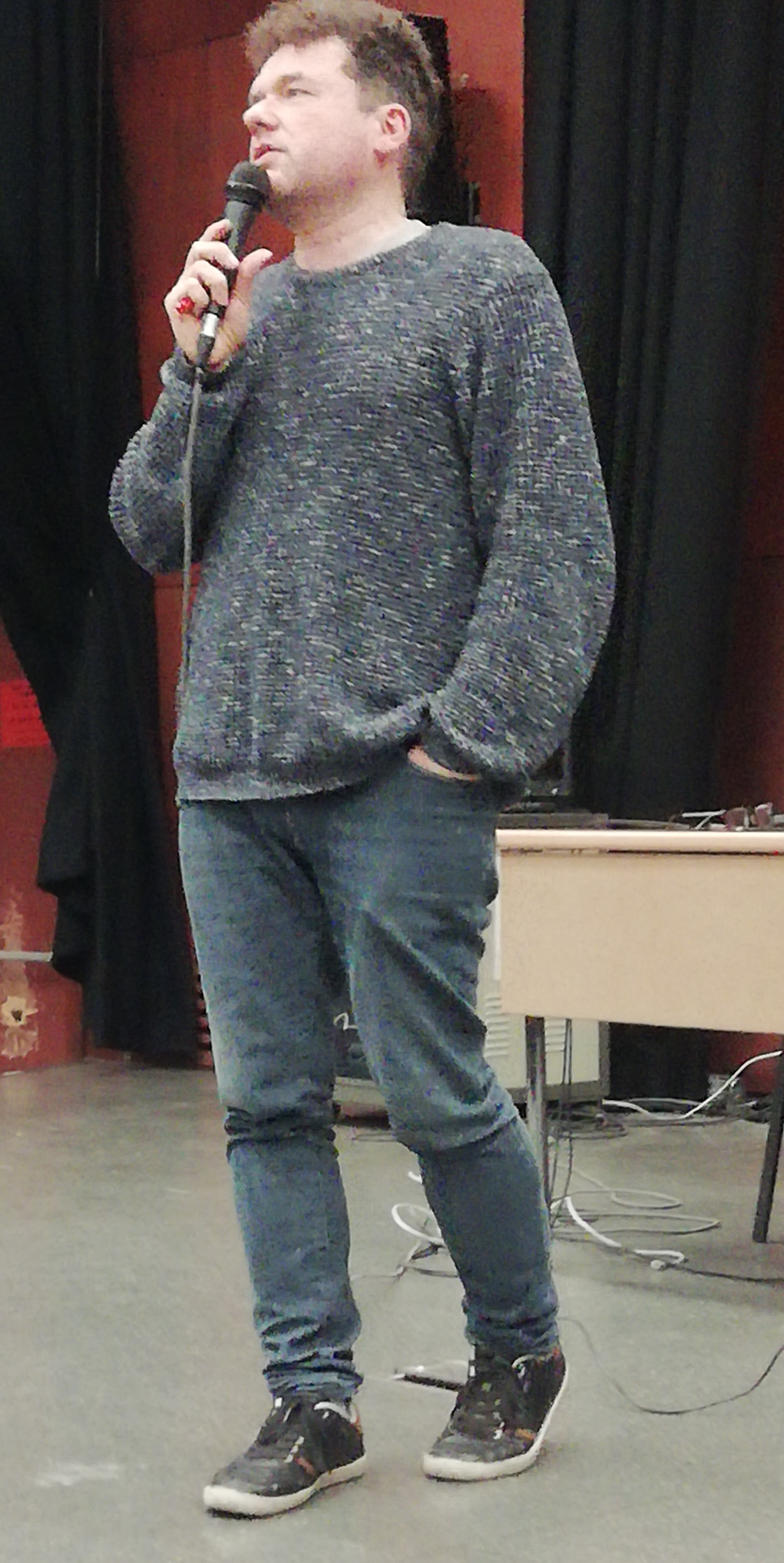
Pascal-Alex Vincent 2019

Pascal-Alex Vincent is a French director, author, screenwriter, and voice actor.

== Biography ==
After training, Vincent worked at Alive (in France) to distribute Japanese films.

Now the director continues his work.

== Filmography ==
=== Short films ===
- 1994: À quatre mains
- 1998: Thomas trébuche (Tommy Trips)
- 2001: Les résultats du bac (Final Exams)
- 2003: Far West
- 2004: Hollywood malgré lui (Hollywood by accident)
- 2005: Bébé requin (Baby Shark)
- 2007: Candy Boy
- 2008: En attendant demain (While waiting for tomorrow)
- 2009: En colo (At Summer Camp | Holiday Camp)
- 2009: Tchernobyl
- 2014: Avec mes plans réguliers, jai confiance

=== Feature film ===
- 2008: Donne-moi la main (Give Me Your Hand)

=== TV ===
- 2009: Adorama
- 2013: Blow Up Arte: Im Sang-soo
- 2014: Blow Up Arte: Kate Bush et le cinéma (Blow Up auf ARTE: Kate Bush und der film)

=== Documentary films ===
- 2010: Miwa, à la recherche du lézard noir (Miwa, a Japanese Icon)
- 2013: Mon quartier c'est...
- 2021: Satoshi Kon: The Illusionist

=== Music clips ===
- 2011: The Princess and the Pea (Family of the Year, clip)
- 2011: Darwin smiles (Kill the Young, clip)
- 2012: Assassin (War in the Bed, clip)
- 2012: Mohammed (War in the Bed, clip)
- 2013: Far away now (Dead Rock Machine, clip)
- 2014: Cowboy disease (Hamster's Shower, clip)
- 2015: Poopsie Q (Eponymous Anonymous, clip)
- 2015: Psilocybe (Psilocybe, clip)
- 2015: Fairy (Diamond Fizz, clip)
