= Dwellers on the Threshold =

Album by Tarwater

Studio album by Tarwater
- Released: 3 September 2002
- Genres: Indietronica, post-rock
- Label: Mute

Tarwater chronology
Animals, Suns & Atoms	Dwellers on the Threshold	The Needle Was Traveling

Dwellers On the Threshold is the fifth full-length release by Tarwater, an electronic music group from Berlin, Germany. The album debuted on 3 September 2002.

The opening song "70 Rupies To Paradise Road" appeared on The Wire's The Wire Tapper 09 compilation CD. "Miracle of Love" is a cover of the Swans song from their album White Light from the Mouth of Infinity.

== Track listing ==
1. "70 Rupies to Paradise Road"
2. "Metal Flakes"
3. "Diver"
4. "1985"
5. "Be Late"
6. "Tesla"
7. "Now"
8. "Miracle of Love"
9. "Phin"
10. "Perfect Shadow"
11. "Dogs and Light Tents"
12. "Imperator Victus"
