= War of the Buttons (2011 Yann Samuell film) =

- French theatrical release poster
- French: La guerre des boutons
- Directed by: Yann Samuell
- Starring: Éric Elmosnino; Mathilde Seigner
- Cinematography: Julien Hirsch
- Music by: Klaus Badelt
- Production companies: One World Films; TF1 Films
- Distributed by: UGC Distribution
- Release date: 28 September 2011
- Running time: 109 minutes
- Country: France
- Language: French

War of the Buttons (French: La guerre des boutons) is a 2011 French adventure film directed by Yann Samuell. It is one of two films based on the eponymous novel by Louis Pergaud released in 2011.

== Plot ==
Set in the south of France in the 1960s, the story follows two groups of children from neighboring villages in rural France. These two groups engage in a series of pranks and fights escalate out of control, The boys use buttons from each other's clothes as trophies. The rivalry continues to intesify as they both compete for dominance, and the kids must navigate the challenges of loyalty and friendship.

== Production ==
The film was directed by Yann Samuell, known for his work on Love Me If You Dare (2003) The movie was filmed in various locations in France, making scenes feel in the rural side just like described in the original novel. According to The European film database, the film was produced by One World Films and TF1 films production.

Filming began on 13 April 2011 in Haute-Vienne, including the villages of Rochechouart and Saint-Junien. In June 2011, filming took place in Chassenon (Charente).

The film was the first job of actor Ivan du Pontavice, son of producer Marc du Pontavice, who worked as a decorator intern, before his debut in the acting years later in 2020 at age 15. The novel was actually part of du Pontavice's son's eighth-grade curriculum, when he had to read it and du Pontavice decided to take a look, and he ended up getting drawn into the story.

== Release and box office ==
The film's runtime is 109 minuits (1h 49m).

According to box-office records, the international release date was 28 September 2011 and had a worldwide gross (per publicity available data) at approximately US$15,082,409.

== Cast ==
- Éric Elmosnino as Maître Merlin
- Mathilde Seigner as La mère de Lebrac
- Fred Testot as Le père Simon
- Alain Chabat as Maître Labru
- Bastien Bouillon as TinTin
- Theo Bertrand as L'Aztec
- Vincent Bres as William Lebrac
- Salomé Lemire as Laterne
- Tristan Vichard as Tigibus
- Tom Terrail as Grandgibus
- Paloma Lebeaut as La petite soeur de Lebrac
