= Yann Samuell =

French film director and screenwriter (born 1975)

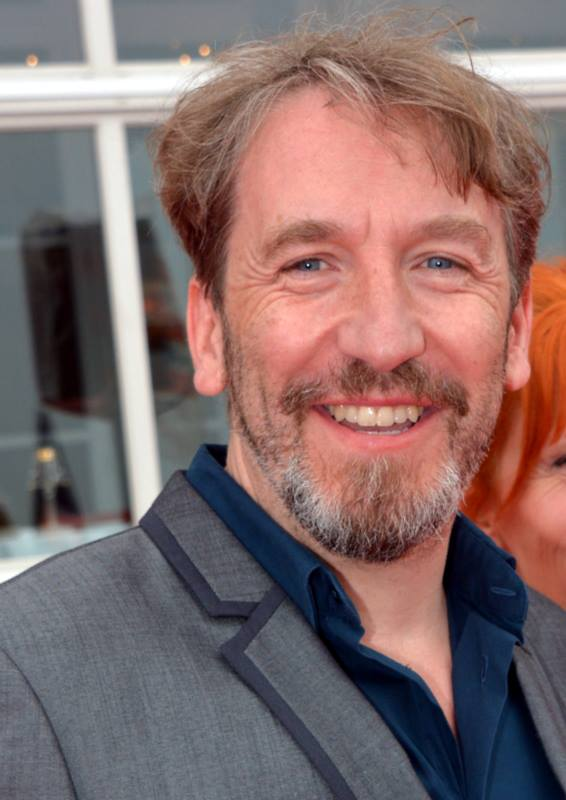
- Yann Samuell at the Cabourg Film Festival in 2016
- Born: 7 June 1975 (age 51); France
- Years active: 1986–present

Yann Samuell (born 7 June 1975) is a French film director and screenwriter.

== Life and career ==
Samuell went to film school and was a storyboard artist before becoming a director. He had his directing debut in 2003 with Love Me If You Dare.

His second film was the romantic comedy My Sassy Girl (2008). Additional works include L'âge de raison (2010).

Samuell was screenwriter and director of a 2011 adaptation of Louis Pergaud's popular novel, La guerre des boutons. This adaptation is set in the 1960s, with the Algerian War as a backdrop. It is produced by Marc du Pontavice.

An alternate film adaptation of Pergaud's novel was directed by Christophe Barratier as La novelle guerre des boutons (2011), set during World War II in Occupied France. Both films were released in France in September 2011.

Samuell also directed the film adaption of the Gothic children's novel The Great Ghost Rescue (1975) by Eva Ibbotson. It was released in 2011.

== Filmography ==
Year	Title	Credited as		Notes
Year	Title	Director	Screenwriter	Notes
1986	Aube	Yes	Yes	Short film
1994	Mano a mano	Yes	Yes	Short film
1997	Cata-clysm	Yes	Yes	Short film
1998	Teddy	Yes	Yes	Short film
2003	Love Me If You Dare	Yes	Yes	Newport Beach Film Festival - Jury Award for Best Drama; Palm Springs International Film Festival - John Schlesinger Award
2008	My Sassy Girl	Yes		
2010	With Love... from the Age of Reason	Yes	Yes	
2011	War of the Buttons	Yes	Yes	
2011	The Great Ghost Rescue	Yes	Yes	
2016	The Canterville Ghost	Yes	Yes	Also editor
2018	My Mother, The Crab and Me	Yes	Yes	
2019	Never without Louna	Yes	Yes	
2020	Grand Hôtel	Yes		
2021	Sauver Lisa	Yes		
2023	The Lulus	Yes	Yes	
2026	Santiago: The Camino Therapy	Yes	Yes	
