= War of the Buttons (2011 Christophe Barratier film) =

- Film poster
- French: La nouvelle guerre des boutons
- Directed by: Christophe Barratier
- Written by: Stéphane Keller; Christophe Barratier; Philippe Lopes-Curval
- Based on: War of the Buttons by Louis Pergaud
- Produced by: Thomas Langmann; Daniel Delume; Emmanuel Montamat
- Starring: Guillaume Canet; Laetitia Casta; Kad Merad; Gérard Jugnot
- Cinematography: Jean Poisson
- Edited by: Anne-Sophie Bion; Yves Deschamps
- Music by: Philippe Rombi
- Distributed by: Mars Films
- Release date: 21 September 2011
- Running time: 100 minutes
- Country: France
- Language: French
- Budget: $16 million
- Box office: $15.1 million

War of the Buttons (French: La nouvelle guerre des boutons) is a 2011 French film directed by Christophe Barratier.

== Plot ==
The story takes place in March 1944 in a small French village. The young people from the neighbouring villages of Longeverne and Velrans have been waging this merciless war as long as anyone can remember: the buttons of all the little prisoners' clothes are removed so that they head home almost naked, vanquished and humiliated. Consequently, this conflict is known as the "War of the Buttons". The village that collects the most buttons will be declared the winner. Meanwhile, Violette, a young Jewish girl, has caught the eye of Lebrac, the intelligent chief of the Longeverne kids who is coming of age, leading his gang and their rivals to consider putting aside their differences in order to protect her from the Nazis.

== Cast ==
- Laetitia Casta as Simone
- Guillaume Canet as the teacher
- Kad Merad as Father Lebrac
- Gérard Jugnot as Father Aztec
- Jean Texier as Lebrac
- Clément Godefroy as Petit (Little) Gibus
- Marc-Henri Wajnberg as Vladimir
- Théophile Baquet as Grand (Big) Gibus
- François Morel as Father Bacaillé
- Louis Dussol as Bacaillé
- Harold Werner as Crique
- Nathan Parent as Camus
- Ilona Bachelier as Violette
- Thomas Goldberg as the Aztec

== Production ==
Principal photography began on 23 May 2011 and took place in the villages of Blesle, Lavaudieu and Lavoûte-Chilhac in the Haute-Loire department in south-central France. A few scenes were shot in the Cantal department. Filming continued until 8 August.

== Discography ==
The CD soundtrack composed by Philippe Rombi was released on Music Box Records label.

== Reception ==
As of June 2020, the film holds a 25% approval rating on review aggregation website Rotten Tomatoes, based on 24 reviews, with an average rating of 4.82 out of 10. At Metacritic, which assigns a normalized rating out of 100 to reviews from mainstream critics, the film received an average score of 41 out of 100, based on 14 reviews, indicating "mixed or average reviews".
