= Christophe Barratier =

French film producer, director, screenwriter and lyricist

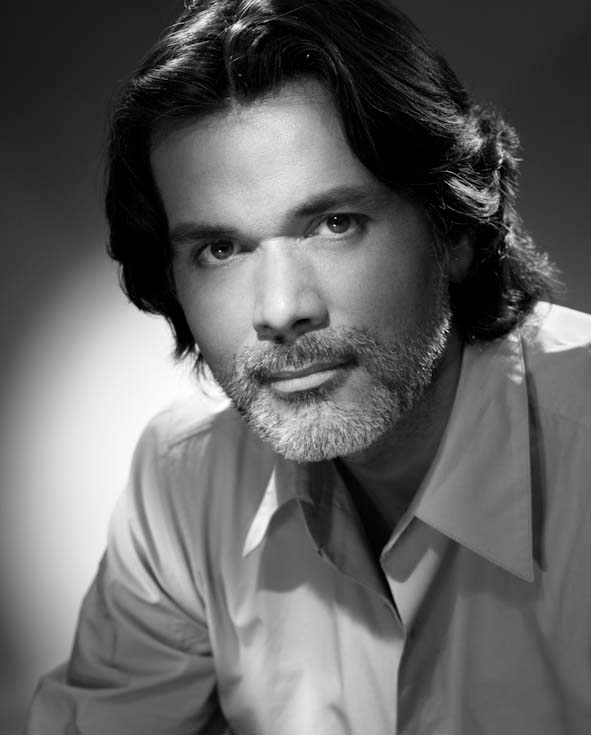
- Christophe Barratier
- Born: 17 June 1963 (age 63); Paris, France
- Occupations: Film director, screenwriter, film producer
- Years active: 1996–present

Christophe Barratier (French: [kʁistɔf baʁatje]; born 17 June 1963) is a French film producer, director and screenwriter, and lyricist.

== Early life and education ==
Barratier is the son of the actress Eva Simonet and M. Barratier. He is the nephew of the film director Jacques Perrin, who was an influence on his choice of career.

Barratier graduated from the prestigious French public school École normale de Paris and won several international competition prizes. Before becoming a filmmaker, he studied classical music and guitar lessons at the Paris Conservatoire.

== Career ==
In 1991, Barratier got into his uncle Jacques Perrin's production firm, Galatée Films, where he learned the profession of producer. As line producer, he participated in making the films Microcosmos (1995), Himalaya (1999) and Winged Migration (2001).

In 2001, he directed his first short film, Les tombales, adapted from the Guy de Maupassant novel. Starring Lambert Wilson and Carole Weiss, the film, whose soundtrack was composed by Bruno Coulais, was selected for the Clermont-Ferrand international short film Festival.

His first feature, The Chorus came out in 2004. An adaptation of the Jean Dréville movie, La cage aux rossignols (1945), its scenario was jointly written with the screenwriter Philippe Lopes-Curval.

His second movie, Paris 36, is based on iconic films choreographed by Busby Berkeley and has a storyline of proletarians confronted to an opportunity such as in La belle équipe from Julien Duvivier (1936).

Alongside the producer Thomas Langmann, he started working on a new adaptation of War of the Buttons (2011) is an adaptation of La Guerre des boutons (War of the Buttons), based on the 1912 novel by Louis Pergaud. It is altered by being set during World War II and the German Occupation of France. It was produced and co-written by Thomas Langmann (an Academy Award-winner for The Artist), with financial participation by Canal Plus. It was released in France in September 2011 and cost €16 million. The film garnered over 1,5 million admissions. It is being distributed in the United States as The War of the Buttons.

Following this, Barratier directed Team Spirit, which revisits the career of Jérôme Kerviel as a trader in the Société Générale company. The movie came out in June 2016. It marks a clear shift from his previous strongly historically connoted movies, but seduces by its well-referenced nature and a realism acquired thanks to its roots into Jérôme Kerviel's biography, L'engrenage : mémoire d'un trader. Team Spirit highlighted a very mediated case while maintaining a storyline based on impartiality towards the man who presented himself as a victim of the banking system.

In 2017, Barratier presented the adaptation of his first success, The Chorus, as a musical show produced at the Folies Bergère theatre in Paris. For his show, the children of La maîtrise des Hauts-de-Seine are the new singers of the filmmaker.

The next year, he signed a new partnership with Pascal Obispo to stage the musical Jésus, de Nazareth à Jérusalem. Based on the greatest Hollywoodian movies, the musical dives into one of the most intense tales of humanity.

The success of the musical The Chorus, presented in 2017 at the Folies Bergère, renewed interest in Canada for Barratier. Thanks to the Serge Denoncourt's staging and conjoint adaptation alongside Maryse Warda, Quebec obtained its own version of the musical on 23 May 2018, featuring ten young performers from Petit Chanteurs de Laval and the Mont-Royal choral groups. However, the setting, characters and history still remained faithful to the original screenplay. The success of this transposition from a French setting to Canadian one, illustrates how music and art in general can transcends geographical as well as emotional barriers.

== Awards ==
As the lyricist of The Chorus' song "Look To Your Path", Barratier was nominated for an Academy Award for Best Original Song. The film was nominated for the Academy Award for Best Foreign Language Film as well as eight César Awards, of which it won two.

His second feature film, Paris 36, starring Gérard Jugnot and Nora Arnezeder, was nominated for Academy Award for Best Original Song and four César Awards.

== Filmography ==
Year	Title	Box office	Role	Notes
1996	Microcosmos	$52.8 million	Producer	Documentary; Nominated – Online Film & Television Association Award for Best Documentary Picture
1999	Himalaya	$40.1 million	Producer	
2001	Winged Migration	$52.8 million	Producer	Documentary
2002	Les tombales		Director & writer	Short
2003	La vie comme elle va		Producer	Documentary; Nominated – International Documentary Association – Feature Documentaries
2004	The Chorus	$83.6 million	Director, writer & lyricist	Austin Film Festival – Best Narrative Feature – Distributed; Bangkok International Film Festival – Best Director; Heartland Film Festival – Crystal Heart Award; Ljubljana International Film Festival – Audience Award; Lumière Award for Best Film; Nominated – Academy Award for Best Foreign Language Film; Nominated – Academy Award for Best Original Song; Nominated – Golden Globe Award for Best Foreign Language Film; Nominated – BAFTA Award for Best Adapted Screenplay; Nominated – BAFTA Award for Best Film Not in the English Language; Nominated – César Award for Best Film; Nominated – César Award for Best Director; Nominated – César Award for Best First Feature Film; Nominated – Bangkok International Film Festival – Best Film; Nominated – Goya Award for Best European Film; Nominated – Karlovy Vary International Film Festival – Crystal Globe; Nominated – London Film Critics' Circle – Foreign Language Film of the Year; Nominated – Young Artist Award for Best International Feature Film
2008	Paris 36	$22.5 million	Director & writer	Nominated – Montreal World Film Festival – Grand Prix des Amériques
2011	War of the Buttons	$13.9 million	Director & writer	Nominated – Palm Springs International Film Festival – Best Narrative Feature
2016	Team Spirit	$90.000	Director & writer	
2021	Fly Me Away		Director & writer	
2022	The Time of Secrets		Director & writer	
2023	Instant Family		Director & writer	
