= War of the Buttons (novel) =

1912 book by Louis Pergaud

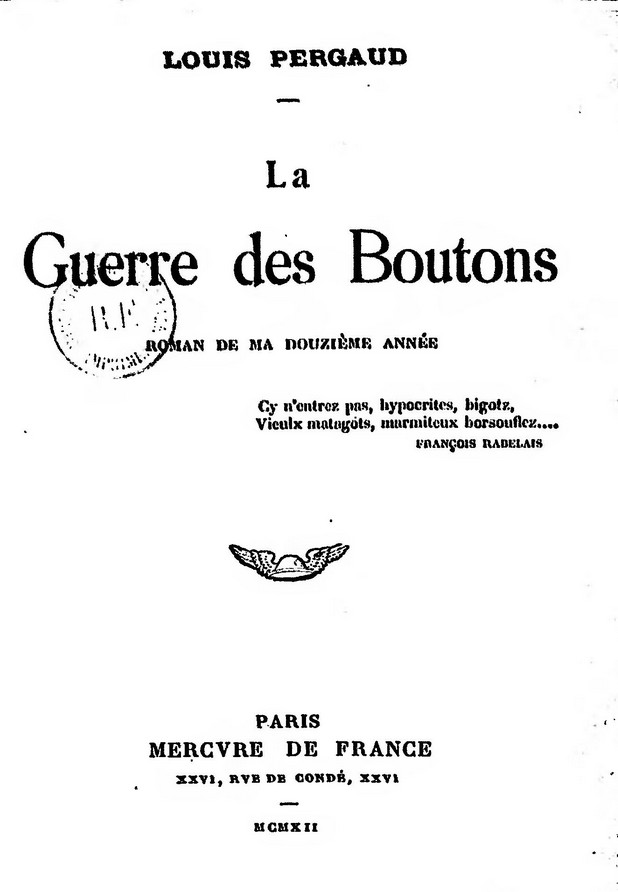
Title page of 1912 edition

La Guerre des boutons (Fr.) or The War of the Buttons, a novel of my twelfth year (complete title) is a French novel written by Louis Pergaud, from the French region of Franche-Comté, and published in 1912. It describes the "war" between two gangs from rival villages, Longeverne and Velrans, in the countryside of Franche-Comté. The author got his inspiration from the village of Landresse, where he taught for two years. The title comes from the goal of the war, to get as many buttons as possible from the opposing side by cutting them off shirts and trousers. For the most part, the story is told from the point of view of the children from Longeverne.

== Plot ==
The children of Longeverne, Lebrac and his army, and the army of Velrans, led by Aztec de Gués, fight each other without mercy, with sticks, stones, and their bare hands.

Those who are unfortunate enough to fall into enemy hands are certain to face humiliation: their buttons and laces are cut off, and they are forced to return home, where they are sure to get a beating from their parents.

Lebrac is so driven by his desire to win each battle that he has his troops use unorthodox fighting methods, such as fighting naked to prevent damage to their clothes, or having girls sew their clothes when they are damaged, among other things.

== See also ==
Other European books depicting "war" between rival groups of boys

- The Paul Street Boys
- The Flying Classroom
- The Otterbury Incident
