= Denis Podalydès =

French actor (born 1963)

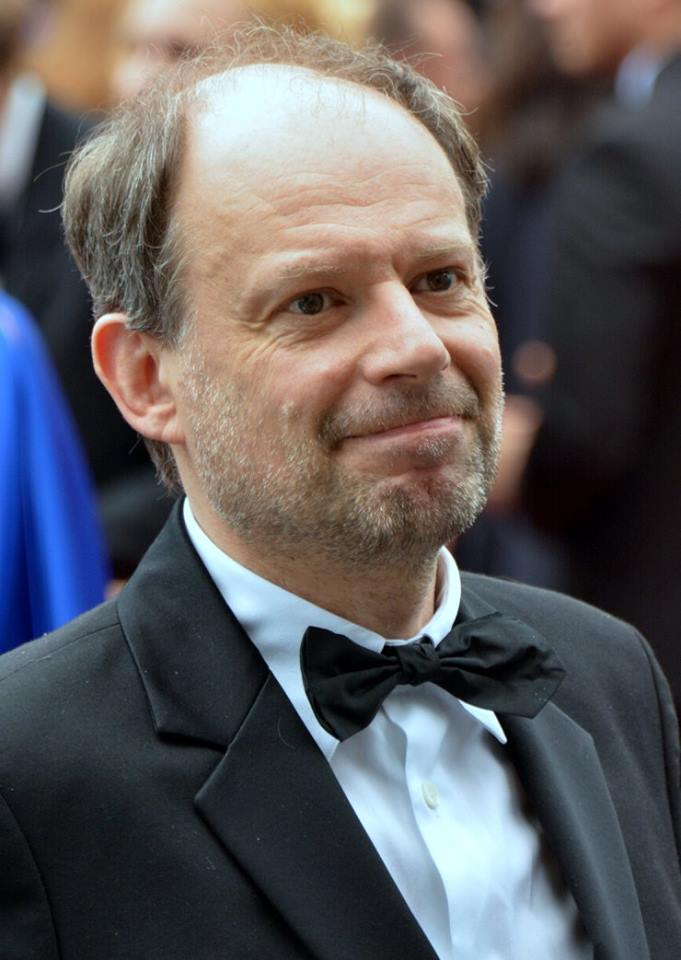
- Podalydès in 2018
- Born: 22 April 1963 (age 63); Versailles, France
- Occupations: Actor, screenwriter, theatre director
- Years active: 1988–present
- Relatives: Bruno Podalydès (brother)

Denis Podalydès (French: [dəni pɔdalidɛs]; born 22 April 1963) is a French actor, scriptwriter, and theatre director. Podalydès has appeared in more than 140 films and television shows since 1989. He starred in The Officers' Ward, which was entered into the 2001 Cannes Film Festival.

Podalydès has been nominated for four César Awards: Best Supporting Actor for Summer Things, The Conquest, and Sorry Angel, and Best Original Screenplay for Granny's Funeral. He is the younger brother of filmmaker Bruno Podalydès, with whom he frequently collaborates.

== Career ==
Born to a family of Greek descent, Podalydès a former student of the Paris Conservatoire national supérieur d'art dramatique, and became a pensionnaire of the Comédie-Française in 1997, and then a sociétaire in 2000, now considered as one of their major actors. He became the 505th sociétaire on 1 January 2000. Before joining that company he had appeared in Sophonisbe by Corneille (1988), L'Épreuve and Les Sincères by Marivaux (1989), La Double Inconstance by Marivaux and Ruy Blas by Victor Hugo (1990), Le Misanthrope by Molière, and Bérénice by Racine (1992), Les Fausses Confidences by Marivaux (1992), and Anatol by Arthur Schnitzler in 1995.

== Director ==
From 2006, he began directing for the stage, with several classics: Cyrano de Bergerac by Edmond Rostand, then in 2008 Fantasio by Alfred de Musset. In 2011, with Emmanuel Bourdieu and Éric Ruf, staged Le Cas Jekyll by Christine Montalbetti In February 2013, he directed L'Homme qui se hait, by Emmanuel Bourdieu at the Théâtre national de Chaillot.

In the world of opera, Podalydès directed Don Pasquale by Gaetano Donizetti in 2012 at the Théâtre des Champs-Élysées. He followed that in 2017 with Rossini's Le Comte Ory at the Opéra Comique, Paris, and Falstaff at the Opéra de Lille conducted by Antonello Allemandi in May 2023. He directed Faust in May 2025 at the Opéra de Lille (shared with the Opéra-Comique) in the original 1859 version, with spoken dialogue but without its ballet, which one reviewer compared to Ian Judge's 1985 production for ENO with its "19th century Parisian costumes, top hats and sombre colours, [which] emphasized the dark underbelly of that society".

== Filmography ==
Year	Title	Role	Director	Notes
1989	Xenia	Matthieu	Patrice Vivancos	
1991	Mayrig	Tehlirian	Henri Verneuil	
1992	Versailles Rive-Gauche	Arnaud	Bruno Podalydès	Short
1992	Mes fiançailles avec Hilda	David	Eric Bitoun	Short
1994	Something Fishy	Martin	Tonie Marshall	
1994	Voilà	Father	Bruno Podalydès	Short
1995	Inner City	Human Resources director	Jean-François Richet	
1995	Soigneurs dehors!	Clément	Pascal Deux	Short
1995	La mal-aimée	The young father	Bertrand Arthuys	TV movie
1996	La Belle Verte	Papapote	Coline Serreau	
1996	L'échappée belle	Sanchez	Étienne Dhaene	
1996	Le journal du séducteur	Accompanying male nurse	Danièle Dubroux	
1996	My Sex Life... or How I Got into an Argument	Jean-Jacques	Arnaud Desplechin	
1996	Je suis ton châtiment		Guillaume Bréaud	Short
1996	Le fou de la tour	Daniel	Luc Béraud	TV movie
1997	La divine poursuite	Marc	Michel Deville	
1997	Un point c'est tout	The man	Linda Arzouni	Short
1998	En plein coeur	Martorel	Pierre Jolivet	
1998	The Perfect Guy	Julien	Olivier Ducastel & Jacques Martineau	Étoiles d'Or - Best Male Newcomer
1998	Dieu seul me voit	Albert	Bruno Podalydès	
1998	La mort du Chinois	Gérard	Jean-Louis Benoît	
1998	À Venise	Pierre	Emmanuel Bourdieu	Short
1998	L'hypothèse rivale		Normand Bergeron	Short
1999	Rien sur Robert	Martin	Pascal Bonitzer	
1999	Children of the Century	Sainte-Beuve	Diane Kurys	
1999	La voleuse de Saint-Lubin	The lawyer	Claire Devers	
2000	À l'attaque!	Yvan	Robert Guédiguian	
2000	Les frères Soeur	Jacques Soeur	Frédéric Jardin	
2000	Comedy of Innocence	Pierre	Raúl Ruiz	
2000	Les Misérables	Scaufflaire	Josée Dayan	TV Mini-Seroes
2001	Liberté-Oléron	Jacques Monot	Bruno Podalydès	
2001	Mortel Transfert	Inspector Chapireau	Jean-Jacques Beineix	
2001	The Officers' Ward	Henri	François Dupeyron	
2001	Malraux, tu m'étonnes!	Titus	Michèle Rosier	
2001	Candidature	Jean Dupuis	Emmanuel Bourdieu	Short
2001	Zaïde, un petit air de vengeance	Thomas Meils	Josée Dayan	TV movie
2002	Safe Conduct	Jean Aurenche	Bertrand Tavernier	
2002	Summer Things	Jérôme	Michel Blanc	Nominated - César Award for Best Supporting Actor
2002	Un monde presque paisible	Charles	Michel Deville	
2003	Vert paradis	Lucas	Emmanuel Bourdieu	
2003	Une affaire qui roule	Claude Carle	Eric Veniard	
2003	It's Easier for a Camel...	Philippe	Valeria Bruni Tedeschi	
2003	The Mystery of the Yellow Room	Joseph Rouletabille	Bruno Podalydès	
2004	Vipère au poing	The narrator	Philippe de Broca	
2004	Le pont des Arts	Guigui	Eugène Green	
2004	Welcome to Switzerland	Thierry	Léa Fazer	
2005	Caché	Yvon	Michael Haneke	
2005	Palais royal!	Titi	Valérie Lemercier	
2005	Grey Souls	Aimé Lafaille	Yves Angelo	
2005	The Perfume of the Lady in Black	Joseph Rouletabille	Bruno Podalydès	
2006	Un an	Louis-Philippe	Laurent Boulanger	
2006	The Da Vinci Code	Flight Controller	Ron Howard	
2006	Le temps des porte-plumes	Falmin	Daniel Duval	
2006	Que sont-ils devenus?	The matador	Bruno Podalydès	Short
2006	Sartre, l'âge des passions	Jean-Paul Sartre	Claude Goretta	TV movie
2006	Le Grand Charles	Claude Mauriac	Bernard Stora	TV Mini-Series
2007	Max & Co	Martin	Samuel & Frédéric Guillaume	
2007	La Vie d'artiste	Bertrand	Marc Fitoussi	
2007	To Each His Own Cinema	The manager	Claude Lelouch	
2007	Le quatrième morceau de la femme coupée en trois	Dominique	Laure Marsac	
2007	Crassus	The narrator	Olivier Treiner	Short
2007	Le pendu	Legoff	Claire Devers	TV movie
2008	Sagan	Guy Schoeller	Diane Kurys	
2008	Coupable	Louis	Laetitia Masson	
2008	Intrusions	Alexis Taget	Emmanuel Bourdieu	
2008	Quiet Chaos	Thierry	Antonello Grimaldi	
2008	La Journée de la jupe	Chief Labouret	Jean-Paul Lilienfeld	
2008	Coluche: l'histoire d'un mec	Jacques Attali	Antoine de Caunes	
2008	Figaro	Figaro	Jacques Weber	TV movie
2008	Un crime très populaire	André Malraux	Didier Grousset	TV movie
2008	Chez Maupassant	Count of Sallure	Jean-Daniel Verhaeghe	TV series (1 episode)
2008	Hard	Himself	Cathy Verney	TV series (3 episodes)
2009	8 fois debout	Mathieu	Xabi Molia	
2009	Park Benches	Aimé Mermot	Bruno Podalydès	
2009	Eleanor's Secret	Dad	Dominique Monféry	
2009	Neuilly Yo Mama!	Stanislas de Chazelle	Gabriel Julien-Laferrière	
2009	Une affaire d'état	Louis Flandin	Eric Valette	
2009	Rien de personnel	Gilles Bergerol	Mathias Gokalp	
2010	Une exécution ordinaire	The concierge	Marc Dugain	
2010	Tandis qu'en bas des hommes en armes	Montaigne	Samuel Rondière	Short
2010	L'illusion comique	Matamore	Mathieu Amalric	TV movie
2010	George et Fanchette	Agricol Thiercellin	Jean-Daniel Verhaeghe	TV movie
2011	The Conquest	Nicolas Sarkozy	Xavier Durringer	Nominated - César Award for Best Actor
2011	The First Man	Professor Bernard	Gianni Amelio	
2011	Omar Killed Me	Pierre-Emmanuel Vaugrenard	Roschdy Zem	
2011	La clé des champs	The narrator	Claude Nuridsany & Marie Pérennou	
2011	Le grand restaurant II	The rejected transvestite	Gérard Pullicino	TV movie
2011	Pasteur, l'homme qui a vu	The narrator	Alain Brunard	TV movie
2011	Drumont, histoire d'un antisémite français	Édouard Drumont	Emmanuel Bourdieu	TV movie
2012	In a Rush	The publisher	Louis-Do de Lencquesaing	
2012	Camille Rewinds	Alphonse Da Costa	Noémie Lvovsky	
2012	Granny's Funeral	Armand Lebrecq	Bruno Podalydès	Nominated - César Award for Best Original Screenplay
2012	Du vent dans mes mollets	Michel Gladstein	Carine Tardieu	
2012	You Ain't Seen Nothin' Yet	Antoine d'Anthac	Alain Resnais	
2012	Ça ne peut pas continuer comme ça!	Barry	Dominique Cabrera	TV movie
2013	For a Woman	Maurice	Diane Kurys	
2013	The Conquerors	Gilead	Xabi Molia	
2013	The Big Bad Wolf	Doctor Stanislas de Lastic	Nicolas & Bruno	
2013	Love Is the Perfect Crime	Richard	Arnaud & Jean-Marie Larrieu	
2013	Meurtre en trois actes	Philippe Laclanche	Claude Mouriéras	TV movie
2014	Libre et assoupi	Richard	Benjamin Guedj	
2014	Un village presque parfait	Henri	Stéphane Meunier	
2014	La forêt	Arkadi	Arnaud Desplechin	TV movie
2014	Marie Curie, une femme sur le front	The narrator	Alain Brunard	TV movie
2014	Casting(s)	Himself	Pierre Niney	TV series (1 episode)
2015	The Sweet Escape	Rémi	Bruno Podalydès	
2016	Chocolat	Louis Lumière	Roschdy Zem	
2016	The Jews	Talmudist #2	Yvan Attal	
2016	La Mécanique de l'ombre	Clément	Thomas Kruithof	
2016	Le passe-muraille	Émile Dutilleul	Dante Desarthe	TV movie
2016	Dans la tête d'un juré	The narrator	Emmanuel Bourdieu	TV movie
2017	The Teacher	François Foucault	Olivier Ayache-Vidal	
2017	Marie-Francine	Emmanuel Doublet	Valérie Lemercier	
2017	Mr. & Mrs. Adelman	The shrink	Nicolas Bedos	
2017	See You Up There	The minister	Albert Dupontel	voice
2017	Paris etc	Jacques Bernaud	Zabou Breitman	TV series (5 episodes)
2018	Bécassine	Adalbert Proey-Minans	Bruno Podalydès	
2018	Sorry Angel	Mathieu	Christophe Honoré	Nominated - César Award for Best Supporting Actor
2018	Neuilly sa mère, sa mère!	Stanislas de Chazelle	Gabriel Julien-Laferrière	
2019	La Belle Époque	François	Nicolas Bedos	
2019	An Officer and a Spy	Maître Demange	Roman Polanski	
2019	Toute ressemblance	Julien Demaistre	Michel Denisot	
2020	Delete History	Bertrand Pitorin	Benoît Delépine; Gustave Kervern	
2020	French Tech		Bruno Podalydès	
2021	Presidents	Coach	Anne Fontaine	
2021	Bloody Oranges	Le ténor du Barreau	Jean-Christophe Meurisse	
2021	Anaïs in Love	Daniel Moreau-Babin	Charline Bourgeois-Tacquet	
2021	Deception	Philip	Arnaud Desplechin	
2022	Rise	Henri Gautier	Cédric Klapisch	
2022	Le Monde d'hier	Franck L'Herbier	Diastème	
2022	Irma Vep	Police Prefect	Olivier Assayas	TV series (1 episode)
2022	La Grande Magie	Charles Moufflet	Noémie Lvovsky	
2022	Classico	Président OM	Nathanaël Guedj and Adrien Piquet-Gauthier	
2022	Julia(s)	Victor Massenet	Olivier Treiner	
2023	All Your Faces	Paul	Jeanne Herry	
2023	L'établi	Junot	Mathias Gokalp	
2023	Homecoming	Marc	Catherine Corsini	
2023	Bernadette	Bernard Niquet	Léa Domenach	
2023	Making of	Simon	Cédric Kahn	
2024	La Petite Vadrouille	Albin	Bruno Podalydès	
2025	Guess Who's Calling! (Le Répondeur)	Pierre	Fabienne Godet	
2026	Maigret and the Dead Lover	Jules Maigret	Pascal Bonitzer	
2026	Comédie-Française	Host of Radio Molière	Martin Darondeau, Bertrand Usclat	

== Theater ==
He was a Sociétaire of the Comédie-Française from 1997 to 2000.

Year	Title	Author	Director	Notes
1988	Sophonisbe	Pierre Corneille	Brigitte Jaques-Wajeman	
1988	Scènes du répertoire	Georg Büchner	Jean-Pierre Vincent	
1989	L'Épreuve & Les Sincères	Pierre de Marivaux	Jean-Pierre Miquel	
1990	Ruy Blas	Victor Hugo	Nicolas Lormeau	
1990	Double Inconstancy	Pierre de Marivaux	Claudia Morin	
1992	Berenice	Jean Racine	Christian Rist	
1992	La Veuve	Pierre Corneille	Christian Rist	
1992	Dîner de textes	Jacques Bonnaffé	Jacques Bonnaffé	
1992	The Misanthrope	Molière	Christian Rist	
1993	Les Fausses Confidences	Pierre de Marivaux	Christian Rist	
1994	Les Originaux	Voltaire	Christian Rist & Denis Podalydès	
1995	Anatol	Arthur Schnitzler	Louis-Do de Lencquesaing	
1996	André le Magnifique	Isabelle Candelier, Michel Vuillermoz, ...	Isabelle Candelier, Michel Vuillermoz, ...	
1997	Arcadia	Tom Stoppard	Philippe Adrien	
1997	Histoire du soldat	Igor Stravinsky	Michel Plasson	
1997	Scapin the Schemer	Molière	Jean-Louis Benoît	
1997	A Month in the Country	Ivan Turgenev	Andreï Smirnoff	
1998	Le Legs	Pierre de Marivaux	Jean-Pierre Miquel	
1999	Chat en poche	Georges Feydeau	Muriel Mayette-Holtz	
1999–2000	The Government Inspector	Nikolai Gogol	Jean-Louis Benoît	Molière Award for Best Newcomer
2000	The Misanthrope	Molière	Jean-Pierre Miquel	
2000	Tout mon possible	Emmanuel Bourdieu	Denis Podalydès	
2001	L'Âne et le Ruisseau	Alfred de Musset	Nicolas Lormeau	
2001	Monsieur de Pourceaugnac	Molière	Philippe Adrien	
2002	Ruy Blas	Victor Hugo	Brigitte Jaques-Wajeman	
2002	Présences	Kateb Yacine	Marcel Bozonnet	
2002	Je crois?	Emmanuel Bourdieu	Denis Podalydès	
2002	Lenz & Leonce and Lena	Georg Büchner	Matthias Langhoff	
2003–2004	The Forest	Alexander Ostrovsky	Pyotr Fomenko	
2004	Platonov	Anton Chekhov	Jacques Lassalle	
2004	The Bacchae	Euripides	André Wilms	
2005	The Liar	Pierre Corneille	Jean-Louis Benoît	
2005	Oedipus Rex	Sophocles	Benno Besson	
2007	Kafka's Soup	Mark Crick	Brice Cauvin	
2007	Le Mental de l’équipe	Emmanuel Bourdieu	Denis Podalydès	
2007–2008	Il campiello	Carlo Goldoni	Jacques Lassalle	
2007–2008	The Italian Straw Hat	Eugène Marin Labiche & Marc-Michel	Jean-Baptiste Sastre	
2008	Fantasio	Alfred de Musset	Denis Podalydès	
2008	Cyrano de Bergerac	Edmond Rostand	Denys Podalydès	Molière Award for Best Director
2008	Figaro Gets a Divorce	Ödön von Horváth	Jacques Lassalle	
2009	L'Illusion Comique	Pierre Corneille	Galin Stoev	
2009–2010	La Grande Magie	Eduardo De Filippo	Dan Jemmett	
2009–2012	The Miser	Molière	Catherine Hiegel	
2010–2011	Richard II	William Shakespeare	Jean-Baptiste Sastre	
2010–2011	Le Cas Jekyll	Christine Montalbetti	Denis Podalydès	
2011	Le Babil des classes dangereuses	Valère Novarina	Denis Podalydès	
2011–2012	Ce que j'appelle oubli	Laurent Mauvignier	Denis Podalydès	
2012	La Place royale	Pierre Corneille	Anne-Laure Liégeois	
2012–2013	Rituals of Signs and Transformations	Saadallah Wannous	Sulayman Al-Bassam	
2013	Hamlet	William Shakespeare	Dan Jemmett	
2013–2014	The Imaginary Invalid	Molière	Claude Stratz	
2014	Betrayal	Harold Pinter	Frédéric Bélier-Garcia	
2014–2015	Répétition	Pascal Rambert	Pascal Rambert	
2016	Tartuffe	Molière	Galin Stoev	
2016	The Damned	Luchino Visconti	Ivo van Hove	Nominated - Molière Award for Best Actor
2016	The Last Days of Mankind	Karl Kraus	David Lescot	
2017	Bajazet	Jean Racine	Éric Ruf	
2017	Une vie	Pascal Rambert	Pascal Rambert	
2019	Twelfth Night	William Shakespeare	Thomas Ostermeier	Nominated - Molière Award for Best Actor
2019	Electra-Oresteia	Euripides	Ivo van Hove	
2019	Fanny and Alexander	Ingmar Bergman	Julie Deliquet	
