= Podalydès =

Podalydès is a surname. Notable people with the surname include:

- Bruno Podalydès (born 1961), French writer, film director, producer and actor
- Denis Podalydès (born 1963), French actor
