= Samir Guesmi =

French actor

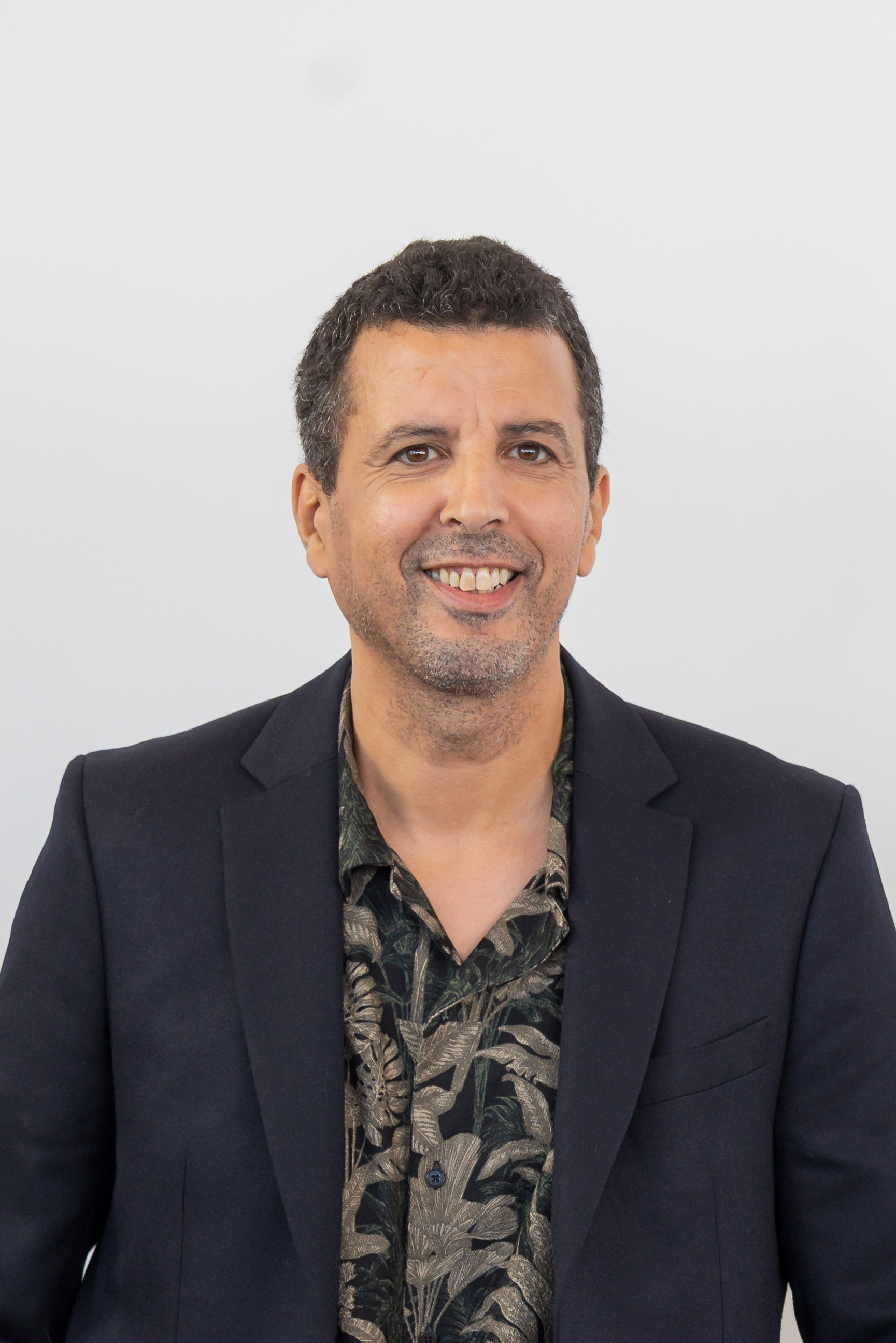
- Guesmi in 2025
- Born: 7 October 1967 (age 59); Paris, France
- Occupations: Actor; Film director
- Years active: 1988–present

Samir Guesmi (born 7 October 1967) is a French actor of stage and screen and film director. He is known for his television roles in Spiral (2008) and The Returned (2012–15).

== Early life and education ==
Samir Guesmi was born in Paris, France, in on 7 October 1967, His father was a construction worker and his mother a childcare worker, and he had eight siblings. He is of North African (Algerian?) descent. (Note: Sources vary as to where his parents were born; one source calls him Algerian in the article title but says Moroccan in the article.)

He did not excel academically at school, but he found a love of theatre, and trained in drama. As a young man, he joined Studio Pygmalion, and then Tania Balachova's Theatre School, and undertook many stage performances. He also studied at the Belle de mai theatre school in Marseille.

== Career ==
Guesmi has performed on stage as well as on screen, in movies and television series.

=== Screen ===
Guesmi's first role on the big screen was in 1987, when he appeared in Jaune revolver, directed by Olivier Langlois. For his lead role as Malik in the 1996 comedy film Malik le maudit, which centres on a young beur who dreams of leaving his suburbs for Canada, he won the Best Actor award at Amiens International Film Festival, as well as the Michel Simon Prize.

In 2001, he starred in L'Afrance (As a Man), directed by Alain Gomis, which won the Silver Leopard at 2002 Locarno Film Festival. In 2003 (often cited as 2005) he appeared in Mathieu Vadepied's short film Le Souffle.

His performances in mainstream movies include La Mentale /The Code (2002) by Manuel Boursinhac; Banlieue 13 (2004) by Pierre Morel; Ne le dis à personne / Tell No One (2006) by Guillaume Canet. His less commercial, auteur cinema films include Betty Fisher et autres histoires / Alias Betty (2001) by Claude Miller; and Selon Charlie / Charlie Says (2006) by Nicole Garcia. Also in 2006 he played Ahmed the receptionist in Philippe Pollet-Villard's short film Le Mozart des pickpockets, which won the 2007 Academy Award for Best Live Action Short Film. and the César Award for Best Short Film in 2008.

For his performance in Alain Gomis' feature Andalucía, in his first major role, he was awarded the Best Actor Award at the 2007 Montecatini International Short Film Festival as well as the Golden Bayard for Best Actor at the 2007 Namur Film Festival.

Guesmi wrote and directed (for the first time) the short film C'est Dimanche! (2008), which won at least six prizes at various international film festivals, including the Be TV award at the Brussels Short Film Festival, and the Special Prize of the Ecumenical Jury, at the 38th Molodist International Film Festival in Kyiv in 2008, second place at the Chicago International Film Festival, and the 2008 Grand Prix Award at the Grenoble Outdoor Short Film Festival (Festival du film court en plein air de Grenoble).

Also in 2008, he appeared on television as feared drug dealer Farouk Larbi in three episodes of the long-running and internationally renowned police and legal drama series Spiral (Engrenages). He also had a major role as Thomas Mézache in the supernatural drama series The Returned / Les Revenants in from 2012 to 2015.

In 2012, his performance in Camille redouble (Camille Rewinds) by Noémie Lvovsky earned him a nomination for the César Award for Best Supporting Actor in 2013. In 2016, he played the role of José Géraud in the French-Portuguese film The Young One.

His directorial feature film debut was Ibrahim, which was screened at Cannes Film Festival in May 2020 and won four awards at the 2020 Angoulême Francophone Film Festival, including Best Film and Best Direction.

In 2021, he played Fouad in the Moroccan film Life Suits Me Well (La vie me va bien), the directorial feature film of Al Hadi Ulad-Mohand. Guesmi was nominated for Best Actor in the Critics' Awards for Arab Films in 2022.

In 2022, he starred alongside Thomas Ngijol as his brother, Lucien, in Fratè, which was filmed in Corsica. In the same year, he starred in Nos frangins (Our Brothers), which was written, directed, and produced by Rachid Bouchareb. The film is about the death of two young men in France in the 1980s at the hands of police, referencing the killing of Malik Oussekine in 1986, and was selected as the official Algerian entry to the Oscars.

Other notable directors with whom Guesmi has worked include Julie Bertuccelli, Bruno Podalydès, Sólveig Anspach, Arnaud Desplechin, Claire Simon, Michel Leclerc, and Valérie Donzelli.

=== Stage ===
Guesmi acted on stage in several performances under the direction of Frédéric Bélier-Garcia. He also performed in the title role in Éric Vigner's production of Othello at the Théâtre de l'Odéon in Paris in November–December 2008.

== Selected filmography ==
=== Actor ===
Year	Title	Role	Director	Notes
1988	Jaune revolver	Khadour	Olivier Langlois	
1991	Noir dessin	Karim	Jean Heches	Short
1992	Savage Nights	Jamel	Cyril Collard	
1992	IP5 : L'île aux pachydermes	Saddam	Jean-Jacques Beineix	
1993	Navarro	Hocine	Patrick Jamain	TV series (1 episode)
1994	Les mickeys		Thomas Vincent	Short
1994	Le clandestin	Ahmed	Jean-Louis Bertucelli	TV movie
1994	Julie Lescaut	Slimane	Élisabeth Rappeneau	TV series (1 episode)
1995	Élisa		Jean Becker	
1995	Fast	Jocelyn	Dante Desarthe	
1995	Paul Bowles - Halbmond	Lahcen	Frieder Schlaich & Irene von Alberti	
1995	La vie parisienne		Hélène Angel	Short
1995	Des hommes avec des bas		Pascal Chaumeil	Short
1995	Le parasite	The vigil	Patrick Dewolf	TV movie
1995	Lulu roi de France	Sami	Bernard Uzan	TV movie
1995	Le serment d'Hippocrate		Jean-Louis Bertucelli	TV movie
1996	Malik le maudit	Malik	Youcef Hamidi	Amiens International Film Festival - Best Actor
1996	Des lendemains qui chantent		Caroline Chomienne	
1996	Le mur	Farid	David Oelhoffen	Short
1997	Les Soeurs Soleil	The Arab	Jeannot Szwarc	
1997	XXL	Delivery man	Ariel Zeitoun	
1997	Autre chose à foutre qu'aimer	Hamed	Carole Giacobbi	
1997	Adios !	Raoul #1	Nicolas Joffrin	
1997	Big Bang	The reader	David Oelhoffen	Short
1997	Seule		Erick Zonca	Short
1997	L'amour à l'ombre	Nordine	Philippe Venault	TV movie
1997	Mauvaises affaires	Karim	Jean-Louis Bertucelli	TV movie
1997	La bastide blanche	Nordine	Miguel Courtois	TV mini-series
1997	Regards d'enfance	The supervisor	Emmanuel Finkiel	TV series (1 episode)
1998	J'aimerais pas crever un dimanche	Mako	Didier Le Pêcheur	
1999	Our Happy Lives	Rachid	Jacques Maillot	
1999	Un pur moment de rock'n roll	Inspector Choukri	Manuel Boursinhac	
1999	Le sourire du clown	The unemployed	Éric Besnard	
1999	Le voyage à Paris		Marc-Henri Dufresne	
1999	Les vilains	Rachid	Xavier Durringer	TV movie
2000	La taule	The cook	Alain Robak	
2000	Cours toujours	Taxi driver	Dante Desarthe	
2000	Du poil sous les roses	The gynecologist	Jean-Julien Chervier & Agnès Obadia	
2000	C.D.D.	267	Olivier Loustau	Short
2000	Mix-cité	Djamel	Christophe Leprêtre	TV movie
2000	Anna en Corse	Hamed	Carole Giacobbi	TV movie
2000	Drug Scenes	Party guest	Guillaume Nicloux	TV series (1 episode)
2001	Alias Betty (Betty Fisher et autres histoires)	Inspector	Claude Miller	
2001	L'Afrance	Khalid	Alain Gomis	
2001	J'ai tué Clémence Acéra	Louis Ben Saïd	Jean-Luc Gaget	
2001	En mon absence		David Oelhoffen	Short
2001	L'attaque du camion de glaces	Claude	Brice Ansel	Short
2001	Docteur Sylvestre	Olivier	Jean-Louis Bertucelli	TV series (1 episode)
2002	Aram	Saad	Robert Kechichian	
2002	The Code (La Mentale)	Daniel	Manuel Boursinhac	
2003	Qui perd gagne !	Albert	Laurent Bénégui	
2003	Violence des échanges en milieu tempéré	Adji Zerouane	Jean-Marc Moutout	
2003	Une grande fille comme toi	Akim	Christophe Blanc & Mercedes Cecchetto	TV movie
2004	District 13 (Banlieue 13)	Jamel	Pierre Morel	
2004	RRRrrrr!!!	Trapper 2	Alain Chabat	
2004	Look at Me	The onlooker 2	Agnès Jaoui	
2004	Destination	Nabil	Fabrice Camoin	Short
2004	Echafaudages	The director	David Oelhoffen	Short
2005	Anthony Zimmer	Lt. Camel Driss	Jérôme Salle	
2005	Akoibon	Friend 1	Édouard Baer	
2005	Ze film	Marco	Guy Jacques	
2005	Le souffle	The young father	Mathieu Vadepied	Short
2005	Don Quichotte	Ricote	Jacques Deschamps	TV movie
2005	Docteur Dassin, généraliste	Rémi Alkoni	Olivier Langlois	TV series (1 episode)
2006	Charlie Says	Mo	Nicole Garcia	
2006	Tell No One	Lieutenant Saraoui	Guillaume Canet	
2006	The Colonel	Ali	Laurent Herbiet	
2006	Ahmed	Ahmed	Alain Gomis	Short
2006	Le Mozart des pickpockets	Ahmed	Philippe Pollet-Villard	Short
2006	Mentir un peu		Agnès Obadia	TV movie
2007	Trivial	Medical student	Sophie Marceau	
2007	Anna M.	The receptionist	Michel Spinosa	
2007	Andalucia	Yacine	Alain Gomis	Festival International du Film Francophone de Namur - Best Actor
2007	Ravages	Malek	Christophe Lamotte	TV movie
2008	Ca$h	Fred	Éric Besnard	
2008	Passe-passe	The nurse	Tonie Marshall	
2008	A Christmas Tale	Spatafora	Arnaud Desplechin	
2008	A Day at the Museum	A guardian	Jean-Michel Ribes	
2008	Leur morale... et la nôtre	Boualem Malik	Florence Quentin	
2008	L'autre rive	Nabil	Fabrice Camoin	Short
2008	Rien dans les poches	Nader	Marion Vernoux	TV movie
2008	Spiral	Farouk Larbi	Philippe Triboit & Philippe Venault	TV series (3 episodes)
2009	Park Benches	Romain	Bruno Podalydès	
2009	All About Actresses	Jennifer's husband	Maïwenn	
2009	I'm Glad My Mother Is Alive	The employer	Nathan & Claude Miller	
2009	Quand la ville mord	Tramson	Dominique Cabrera	TV movie
2010	Outside the Law	Otmani	Rachid Bouchareb	
2010	A Few Days of Respite	Hassan	Amor Hakkar	
2010	L'Avocat	Ben Corey	Cédric Anger	
2010	En chantier, monsieur Tanner !	Khaled	Stefan Liberski	TV movie
2011	The Woman in the Fifth	Sezer	Paweł Pawlikowski	
2011	My Worst Nightmare	The DDASS Inspector	Anne Fontaine	
2011	Au cas où je n'aurais pas la palme d'or	Yossef	Renaud Cohen	
2012	Camille Rewinds (Camille redouble)	Éric	Noémie Lvovsky	Nominated - César Award for Best Supporting Actor
2012	Pirate TV	Bébé	Michel Leclerc	
2012	Granny's Funeral	Haroun	Bruno Podalydès	
2012	Cherry on the Cake	Maxime	Laura Morante	
2012	Queen of Montreuil	Samir	Sólveig Anspach	
2012	Frank-Étienne vers la béatitude	Serge Bercot	Constance Meyer	Short
2012–15	The Returned (Les Revenants)	Thomas Mézache	Fabrice Gobert, Frédéric Mermoud, ...	TV series (10 episodes)
2013	Gare du Nord	Julien	Claire Simon	
2013	Je suis supporter du Standard	Lakdar	Riton Liebman	
2014	Brèves de comptoir	Couss	Jean-Michel Ribes	
2014	Poisson	Karim	Aurélien Vernhes-Lermusiaux	Short
2015	The Transporter Refueled	Inspector Bectaoui	Camille Delamarre	
2015	The Sweet Escape	The delivery guy	Bruno Podalydès	
2015	Belle gueule	The father	Emma Benestan	Short
2015	Les mâles ne vivent pas	Philippe	Matthieu Salmon	Short
2015	Nina	Ali	Éric Le Roux	TV series (1 episode)
2016	The Aquatic Effect	Samir	Sólveig Anspach	
2016	The Young One	José Géraud	Julien Samani	
2016	Ma révolution	Moncef	Ramzi Ben Sliman	
2016	D'une pierre deux coups	Hedi	Fejria Deliba	
2016	Première séance	Ivan	Jonathan Borgel	Short
2017	Ismael's Ghosts	Doctor	Arnaud Desplechin	
2017	I Got Life!	The trainer	Blandine Lenoir	
2017	La mélodie	Farid Brahimi	Rachid Hami	
2017	La bête curieuse	Idir	Laurent Perreau	TV movie
2018	La dernière folie de Claire Darling	Amir	Julie Bertuccelli	
2018	Tout ce qu'il me reste de la révolution	Emmanuel	Judith Davis	
2018	Ben	Laurent Wagner	Akim Isker	TV series (6 episodes)
2019	Notre dame	Greg	Valérie Donzelli	
2021	Life Suits Me Well (La vie me va bien)	Fouad	Al Hadi Ulad-Mohand	Nominated, Best Actor, Critics' Awards for Arab Films 2022
2022	That Kind of Summer	Sami	Denis Côté	
2022	For My Country	Adil	Rachid Hami	
2022	Nos frangins (Our Brothers)	Ouassini Benyahia	Rachid Bouchareb	
2025	The Cost of Heaven	Nacer Belkacem	Mathieu Denis	
2025	The Site	Saïd	Akihiro Hata	

=== Filmmaker ===
Year	Title	Role	Notes
2008	C'est dimanche!	Director & writer	Short; Audience Award,Clermont-Ferrand International Short Film Festival; Multiple other nominations and wins

== Theatre ==
Year	Title	Author	Director
1991	Les mariés de la tour Eiffel	Jean Cocteau	Olivier Mothes
1994–95	Tue la mort	Tom Murphy	Bernard Bloch
2002	Une nuit arabe	Roland Schimmelpfennig	Frédéric Bélier-Garcia
2003	Cinq Hommes	Daniel Keene	Stéphane Müh
2008	Othello	William Shakespeare	Éric Vigner
2008	La Ronde	Arthur Schnitzler	Frédéric Bélier-Garcia
2013–14	Perplexe	Marius von Mayenburg	Frédéric Bélier-Garcia
