= Michel Vuillermoz =

French actor and scriptwriter (born 1962)

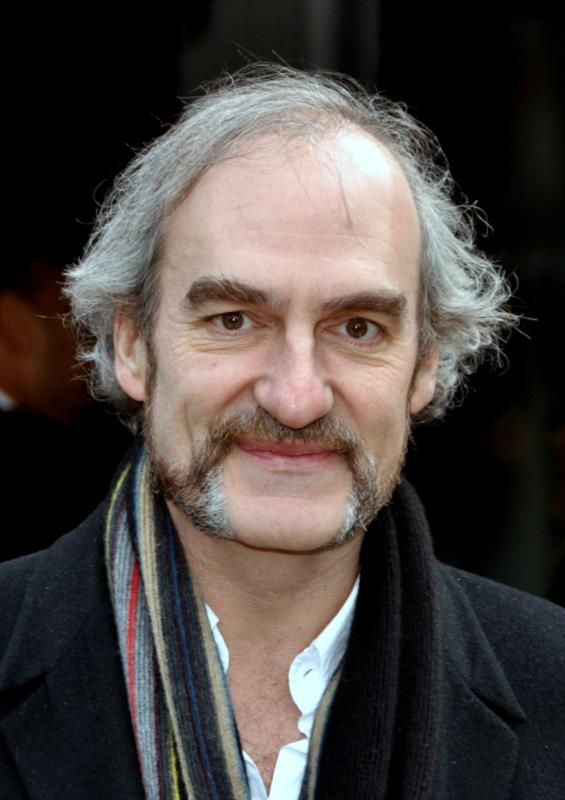
- Vuillermoz in 2013
- Born: 18 December 1962 (age 63); Orléans, France
- Occupations: Actor, screenwriter
- Years active: 1987–present

Michel Vuillermoz (born 18 December 1962) is a French actor and scriptwriter.

Vuillermoz has appeared in more than 100 films and 40 plays.

In 1998, he received two Molière Award: Best Male Newcomer and Best Play for André le Magnifique.

Since 2007, he is one of the Sociétaires of the Comédie-Française.

In 2009, Vuillermoz signed a petition in support of film director Roman Polanski, calling for his release after Polanski was arrested in Switzerland in relation to his 1977 sexual abuse case

== Selected filmography ==
Year	Title	Role	Director
1988	Gang of Four	an accomplice	Jacques Rivette
1990	Cyrano de Bergerac	uncredited	Jean-Paul Rappeneau
1996	My Sex Life... or How I Got into an Argument	Frédéric Rabier	Arnaud Desplechin
1996	Bernie	the cross-dresser	Albert Dupontel
1998	Serial Lover	Charles Thiriot	James Huth
2000	Les Acteurs	The nurse	Bertrand Blier
2001	Absolument fabuleux	the inspector	Gabriel Aghion
2002	Peau d'Ange	Grégoire's uncle	Vincent Perez
2003	Bon voyage	Monsieur Girard	Jean-Paul Rappeneau
2004	A Very Long Engagement	P'tit Louis	Jean-Pierre Jeunet
2004	Me and My Sister	Richard	Alexandra Leclère
2004	The First Time I Turned Twenty	M. Conrad	Lorraine Lévy
2006	La Maison du Bonheur	Jacques Kurtz	Dany Boon
2006	Cabaret Paradis	Jeff	Corinne and Gilles Benizio
2006	Avenue Montaigne	Félix	Danièle Thompson
2006	Atonement	the Frenchman	Joe Wright
2007	To Each His Own Cinema	a peculiar spectator	Roman Polanski (sketch)
2008	Passe-passe	Sacha Lombard	Tonie Marshall
2009	Wild Grass	Lucien d'Orange	Alain Resnais
2009	Park Benches	The second manager	Bruno Podalydès
2009	One for the Road	Pierre	Philippe Godeau
2010	The Princess of Montpensier	the Duke of Montpensier	Bertrand Tavernier
2010	Top Floor, Left Wing	the prefect	Angelo Cianci
2011	15 Lads (Nos résistances)	Lieutenant Lebel	Romain Cogitore
2011	Midnight in Paris	Louis XIV	Woody Allen
2011	18 Years Old and Rising	Pierre Bramsi	Fred Louf
2012	You Ain't Seen Nothin' Yet!	Vincent	Alain Resnais
2012	Granny's Funeral	Rovier Boubet	Bruno Podalydès (2)
2012	Camille redouble	Camille's father	Noémie Lvovsky
2012	Maman	Erwan de Kerdoec	Alexandra Leclère
2013	Longwave	Joseph-Marie Cauvin	Lionel Baier
2014	Life of Riley		
2014	Jamais le premier soir	Viktor Bells	Melissa Drigeard
2014	L'Affaire SK1	Carbonnel	Frédéric Tellier (1)
2015	Daddy or Mommy	Coutine	Martin Bourboulon
2015	The Sweet Escape	Christophe	Bruno Podalydès (3)
2015	All Three of Us	Daniel Bioton	Kheiron
2015	Le Grand Partage	Grégory Bretzel	Alexandra Leclère
2016	My Life as a Courgette	Raymond (voice)	Claude Barras
2017	Knock	Monsieur Mousquet	Lorraine Lévy
2017	See You Up There	Joseph Merlin	Albert Dupontel (2)
2017	Garde alternée	Félix	Alexandra Leclère (2)
2018	Bécassine	Uncle Corentin	Bruno Podalydès (4)
2021–2022	UFOs	Marcel Bénes	TV series
2023	Abbé Pierre – A Century of Devotion	Georges Legay	Frédéric Tellier (2)
2023	Bernadette	Jacques Chirac	Léa Domenach
2024	Savages	The foreman	Claude Barras
