= Granny's Funeral =

2012 film

- Film poster
- Directed by: Bruno Podalydès
- Written by: Bruno Podalydès; Denis Podalydès
- Produced by: Pascal Caucheteux
- Starring: Denis Podalydès
- Cinematography: Pierre Cottereau
- Edited by: Christel Dewynter
- Production companies: Why Not Productions; France 3 Cinéma
- Distributed by: UGC Distribution
- Release dates: 20 May 2012 (Cannes); 20 June 2012 (France)
- Running time: 100 minutes
- Country: France
- Language: French
- Budget: $3.4 million
- Box office: $3.9 million

Granny's Funeral (French: Adieu Berthe, l'enterrement de mémé) is a 2012 French comedy film directed by Bruno Podalydès. The film was screened in the Directors' Fortnight section at the 2012 Cannes Film Festival.

== Plot ==
After Granny's death, Armand, pharmacist in Chatou, France, has to deal with his father who has Alzheimers, his wife, Helen, who doesn't want to divorce and his very demanding mistress, Alix.

== Cast ==
- Denis Podalydès as Armand Lebrecq
- Valérie Lemercier as Alix
- Isabelle Candelier as Hélène Lebrecq
- Catherine Hiegel as Suzanne
- Michel Vuillermoz as Charles Rovier-Boubet
- Bruno Podalydès as Yvon Grinda
- Samir Guesmi as Haroun
- Pierre Arditi as Armand's father
- Michel Robin as Monsieur Salvini
- Judith Magre as Madame de Tandévou
- Vimala Pons as Young Berthe
- Noémie Lvovsky as The cryer
