= Queens of the Ring =

- Theatrical release poster
- French: Les reines du ring
- Directed by: Jean-Marc Rudnicki
- Written by: Manon Dillys; Hélène Le Gall; Marie Pavlenko; Clément Michel; Jean-Marc Rudnicki
- Story by: Hélène Le Gall
- Produced by: Fabrice Goldstein; Thomas Langmann; Antoine Rein; Michael Luisi
- Starring: Marilou Berry; Nathalie Baye; Audrey Fleurot; Corinne Masiero
- Cinematography: Antoine Monod
- Edited by: Antoine Vareille
- Music by: Frederic Sans
- Production companies: Karé Productions; La Petite Reine; Orange Studio; M6 Films; CN2 Productions; Canal+
- Distributed by: Warner Bros. Pictures
- Release dates: June 2013 (Cabourg); 3 July 2013 (France)
- Running time: 97 minutes
- Country: France
- Language: French
- Budget: $12.4 million
- Box office: $1.7 million

Queens of the Ring (French: Les reines du ring) is a 2013 French comedy film directed by Jean-Marc Rudnicki. The film was supported by WWE Studios.

== Plot ==
A single mother with a criminal past is upset by being ignored by her child who is growing into adolescence and preferring the company of his school friends to hers. She decides to appeal to the only thing that her son is interested in by training with her workmates from the supermarket to become a female wrestler.

== Cast ==
- Marilou Berry as Rose / Rosa Croft
- Nathalie Baye as Colette / Wonder Colette
- Audrey Fleurot as Jessica / Calamity Jess
- Corinne Masiero as Viviane / Kill Biloute
- André Dussollier as Richard Cœur de Lion
- Isabelle Nanty as Sandrine Pédrono
- Jacques Frantz as Tonio
- Émilie Gavois-Kahn as Evelyne
- CM Punk, The Miz & Eve Torres as Themselves
