= Bérengère Krief =

French actress and comedian (born 1983)

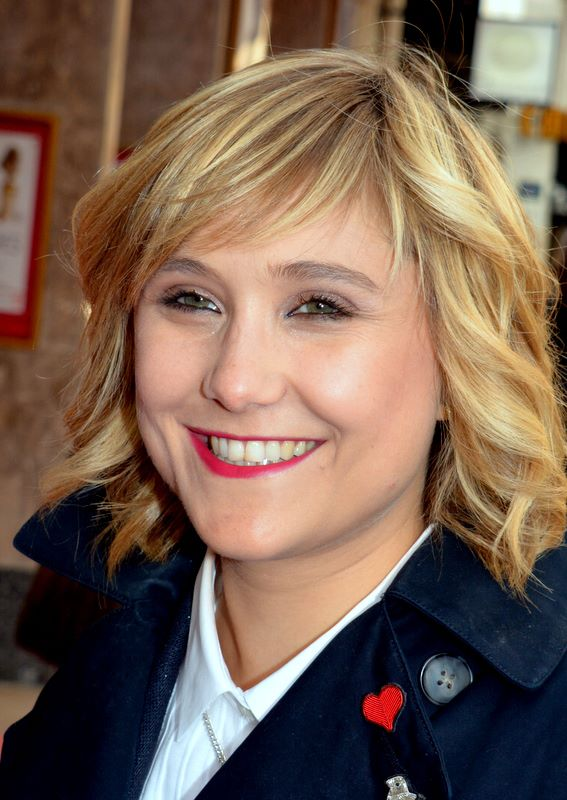
- Bérengère Krief in 2015
- Born: 16 April 1983 (age 43); Lyon, France
- Occupations: Actress, Comedian
- Years active: 2004–present

Bérengère Krief (born 16 April 1983) is a French actress and comedian.

== Filmography ==
Year	Title	Role	Director	Notes
2004	Mrs. Murphy	Helen Murphy	Nicolas Vivien	Short
2009	Machination	The assistant	Arnaud Demanche	Short
2010	Hero Corp	Britney	Simon Astier	TV series (3 episodes)
2011	Chômage affectif	Mélanie	Catherine Villeminot	Short
2011	Bref	Marla	Kyan Khojandi & Bruno Muschio	TV series (9 episodes)
2013	Joséphine	Chloé	Agnès Obadia	
2013	Being Homer Simpson	Catheline	Arnaud Demanche	Short
2013	C'est la crise	Bérengère	David Freymond	TV series (9 episodes)
2016	Roommates Wanted	Manuela Baudry	François Desagnat	
2016	Joséphine, Pregnant & Fabulous	Chloé	Marilou Berry	
2017	Bad Buzz	Sophie	Stéphane Kazandjian	
2018	L'école est finie	Agathe Langlois	Anne Depétrini	
2018	Le gendre de ma vie	Stéphane's patient	François Desagnat	
2019	Victor et Célia	Louise	Pierre Jolivet	
2019	Quand on crie au loup	Pauline Pividale	Marilou Berry	
2020	Brutus VS Cesar	Erell	Kheiron	Filming

== Theater ==
Year	Title	Author
2006	3 nuits pas plus	Julie Dousset
2007	Asseyez-vous sur le canapé, j'aiguise mon couteau	Alexandre Delimoges
2008	Pierre et la Princesse ensorcelée	Martin Leloup
2008	Nationale 666	Lilian Lloyd
2009	Le Connasse Comedy Club	Bérengère Krief
2009	Les Colocataires	Bérengère Krief
2009	La Princesse au petit pois dans la tête	Martin Leloup
2009–11	Ma mère, mon chat et Docteur House	Bérengère Krief
2012–16	Bérengère Krief	Bérengère Krief
