= Park Benches =

- Directed by: Bruno Podalydès
- Written by: Bruno Podalydès
- Edited by: Jean-Denis Buré; Emmanuelle Castro
- Music by: David Lafore; Ezéchiel Pailhès
- Production companies: Why Not Productions; France 2 Cinéma
- Distributed by: UGC Distribution
- Release dates: 5 July 2009 (Paris Cinéma); 8 July 2009 (France)
- Running time: 110 minutes
- Country: France
- Language: French
- Budget: $5.8 million
- Box office: $1.9 million

Park Benches (French: Bancs Publics (Versailles rive droite)) is a 2009 French film directed by Bruno Podalydès, with an all-star cast.

== Plot ==
Bancs Publics tells the story of a lonely man, observed by employees from an office across the street, onlookers from the Square des Francines, and clients in the Brico-Dream shop.

== Cast ==
- Ridan as The singer
- Denis Podalydès as Aimé Mermot
- Samir Guesmi as Romain
- Bruno Podalydès as Bretelle
- Laure Calamy as Opportune
- Olivier Gourmet as Maurice Begeard
- Chantal Lauby as Pascale
- Hippolyte Girardot as Framework #1
- Michel Vuillermoz as Framework #2
- Josiane Balasko as Solange Renivelle
- Éric Prat as The building inhabitant
- Thierry Lhermitte as The medecin
- Micheline Dax as The philosopher neighbor
- Bernard Campan as The suspicious neighbor
- Julie Depardieu as The suspicious neighbor's wife
- Pierre Arditi as Monsieur Borelly
- Claude Rich as The backgammon player #1
- Michel Aumont as The backgammon player #2
- Didier Bourdon as The captain #1
- Nicole Garcia as The radio's woman
- Vincent Elbaz as The jogger
- Mathieu Amalric as The pram father
- Éric Elmosnino as The sleeper
- Chiara Mastroianni as Marianne's mother
- Emmanuelle Devos as Arthur's mother
- Élie Semoun as The dredger #2
- Isabelle Candelier as The left woman
- Guilaine Londez as The wallpapers client
- Pascal Légitimus as The Beuck DCA client
- Amira Casar as The socket client
- Michael Lonsdale as The mat client
- Christophe Beaucarne as The Sporgex client
- Catherine Deneuve as The little cabinet client
- Benoît Poelvoorde as The peg client
- George Aguilar as Gary
