= Areen Omari =

Palestinian actress and producer

- عرين عمري
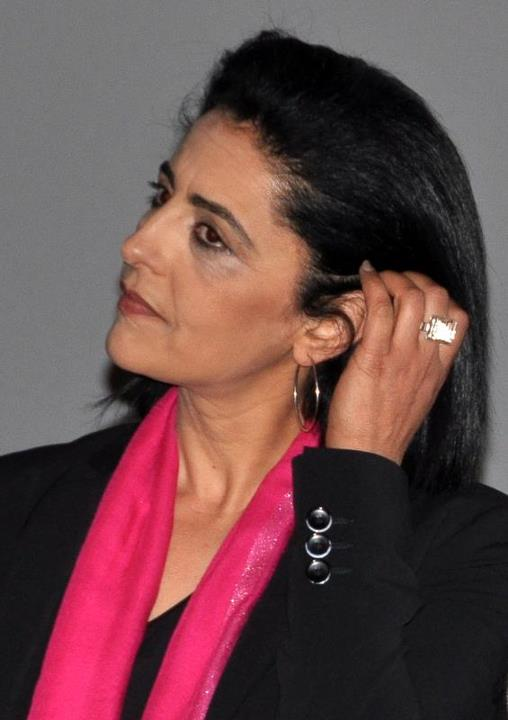
- Omari in April 2012
- Born: Ramallah, West Bank, Palestine
- Occupations: Actress, producer
- Years active: 1994–present
- Known for: Curfew (1994); Haifa (1996); The Other Son (2012)

Areen Omari (Arabic: عرين عمري) is a Palestinian actress and producer from Ramallah, West Bank.

== Personal life ==
Omari lives in Ramallah. She often works with Rashid Masharawi and has an important role in The Other Son by Lorraine Lévy.

== Career ==
=== Actress ===
- 1994: Curfew by Rashid Masharawi : Houda
- 1996: Haïfa by Rashid Masharawi : Samira
- 2002: Ticket to Jerusalem by Rashid Masharawi : Sana
- 2003: The Olive Harvest by Hanna Elias
- 2004: Private by Saverio Costanzo : Samiah B.
- 2005: Waiting by Rashid Masharawi : Bissan Nasar
- 2008: Leila's birthday by Rashid Masharawi : Um Laila
- 2012: The Other Son by Lorraine Lévy : Leïla Al Bezaaz
- 2014: Eyes of a Thief

=== Producer ===
- 1996: Haïfa (producer executive)
- 2002: Ticket to Jerusalem (producer executive)
