= Olivier Ayache-Vidal =

French filmmaker

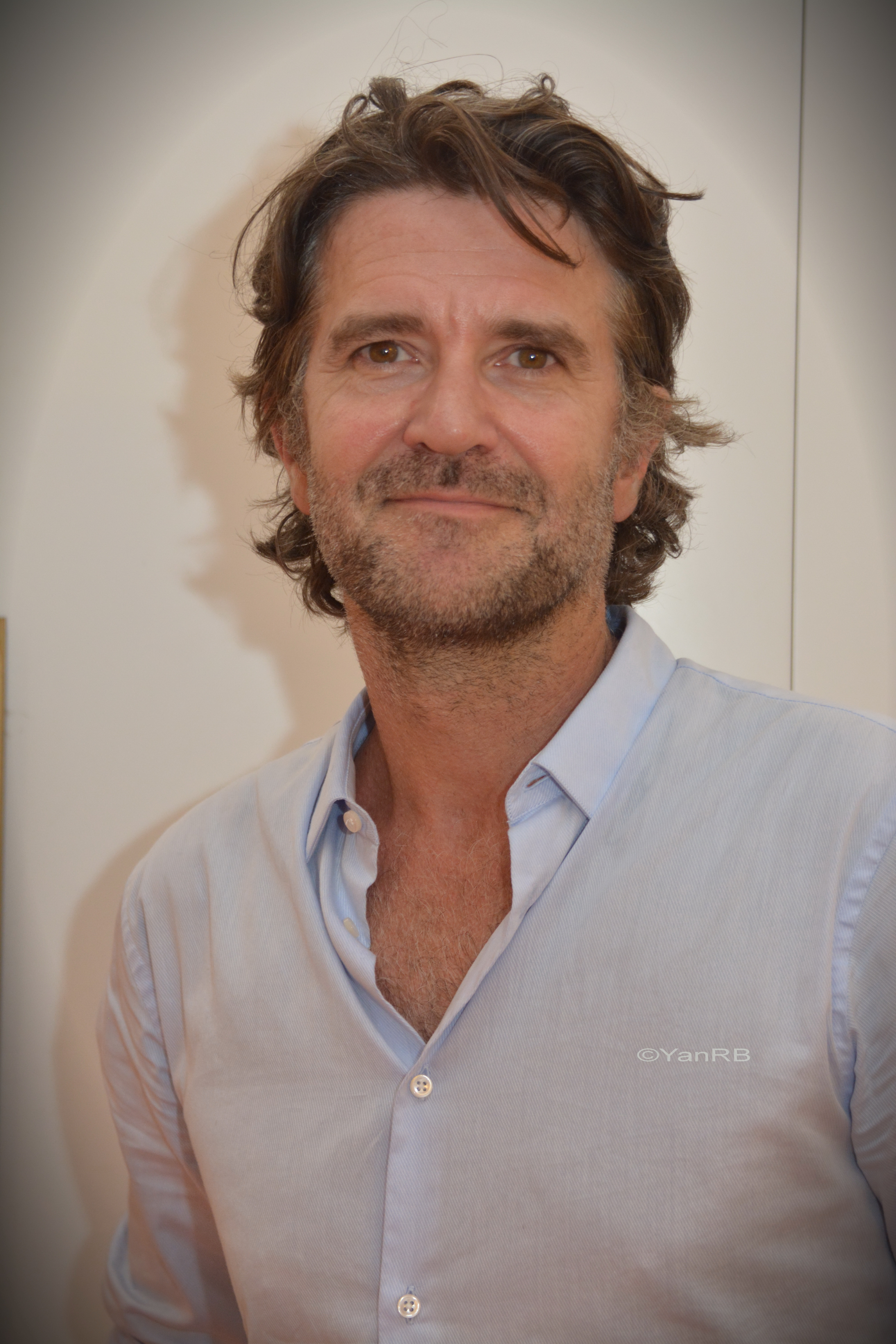
- Olivier Ayache-Vidal at the Les Grands Esprits film premiere at Gaumont Wilson Toulouse
- Born: France
- Occupations: Film director, screenwriter, stage director, photojournalist
- Years active: 1992–present

Olivier Ayache-Vidal is a French film director and screenwriter.

== Early life and education ==
Olivier Ayache-Vidal studied social sciences and communications.

== Early career ==
Ayache-Vidal first worked as a creative in an advertisement agency. He directed various advertisements : M&M's, Maggi, Activia, Panzani, etc.

Between 1992 and 1997, he worked as a photographic journalist for a number of publications and journalistic agencies (Gamma Agency, Agence Vu, Science & Vie Junior), covering scientific, cultural and social subjects. He also went on a mission to Southeast Asia, covering the UNESCO’s Education For All Programme. There, he photographed vulnerable populations helped by the programme, such as the Akha, Hmong, Lisu and Karen peoples of Thailand, the women of Bangladesh and the children of the streets of Saigon.

His first comic script was Fox One – Armageddon. To create this comic series, he attended the Red Flag Air Force Exercise at the Nellis Air Force Base, in Nevada, visited the Charles de Gaulle, Foch and Clemenceau aircraft carriers during high seas exercises, and visited French Air Force Bases. In late 1997, the first tome of "Fox One", Armageddon, was published, with a script by Olivier Ayache-Vidal. In 1999, the second tome was released: T.L.D and in 2001, NDE (“Near Death Experience"). The Fox One series was translated in five languages and sold over 90,000 copies.

== Film career ==
In 2002, Ayache-Vidal directed his first short film, Undercover, a seven-minute presentation which mixed cinema and a live show; it won multiple international awards. In it one can find one of his central themes: the blurred distinction between fiction and reality.

Later on, he filmed Coming-out (2004), a comedy starring Omar Sy, whose script was late adapted to a live show by comedians Omar et Fred. In 2006, he directed Mon dernier rôle, starring Patrick Chesnais and guest starring Patrick Poivre d’Arvor during a fake news broadcast. This black comedy was selected in fifty festivals, winning several awards, including the grand prize of the Meudon short film festival and the grand prize of the Comedia Festival, in Montreal.

In 2007, he returned to his journalistic roots, shooting the documentary Hôtel du Cheval Blanc, for six months. This film presented the terrible living conditions of the thousands of families who are hosted in insanitary hotels every year.

In 2008, he went to China to adapt and stage his first theatre performance, The Nutcracker ballet. This version, produced by the Gruber Ballet Opéra, which presents 39 artists from Chinese State Circus, has made a world tour, starting in France in 2009.

In 2012, he returned to cinema, writing and directing Welcome to China with Gad Elmaleh and Arié Elmaleh. Shot in Shanghai, the short film presents the two brothers playing their own roles.

In 2013, he started research for his first feature film, which tells the story of a posh high school teacher in Paris who is transferred to the city's poorer suburbs. For three years, Olivier immersed himself in the daily lives of high schools of the Seine-Saint-Denis region, on the outskirts of the french capital. Among them, he resided in the Barbara High School of Stains, which became the main setting of the film. The students participated in the project, becoming characters of the feature film. Shooting started in 2016. The film bore its final title, Les Grands Esprits (The Teacher in English), with Denis Podalydès in the main role. The Teacher was released in cinemas in France in 2017. It was shown in cinemas all around the world, in countries including the United States, Canada, Brazil, Argentina, Mexico, Peru, Italy, Spain, Japan, Taiwan, Nigeria, Senegal, and the Ivory Coast. The film was used as an educational tool by teachers in France and several other countries.

== Stage directing ==
Starting 2008, he staged The Nutcracker made in China, a production of the Gruber Ballet Opera that mixes dance, theatre and acrobatics. He adapted Hoffmann’s classical tale and directed Dalian’s acrobatic troupe.

== Awards and nominations ==
- 2018: "Rendez-Vous France 24" Award at the Rendez-vous du nouveau cinéma français Festival, in Rome for The Teacher
- 2014 : Audience Award for the best short film at the Gold Coast Film Festival, in New York for Welcome to China
- 2007 : Student Audience Award at the Kraków Film Festival for Mon dernier rôle
- 2006 : Grand Prize at the Comedia Festival, in Montréal for Mon dernier rôle
- 2006 : Grand Prize at the Comedy Short Film Festival, in Meudon for Mon dernier rôle
- 2002 : Nominated for the first prize of the Montréal World Film Festival for Undercover
- 2002 : Nominated for the Golden Bayard at the Festival international du film francophone de Namur for Undercover
- 2002 : Second place Audience Award at the Beaurepaire International Film Festival for Undercover
- 2002 : Best Short Film Award at the Bordeaux European Short Film Festival for Undercover
- 2002 : Audience Award and Special Jury Prize at the Brussels International Fantastic Film Festival for Undercover

== Comic book scripts ==
- Fox One, drawings by Renaud Garreta, Philippe Arnaud SA
- Armageddon (1997) ISBN 2-9511483-0-5
- T.L.D. (1999) ISBN 2-913482-00-7
- NDE (2001) ISBN 2-913482-02-3

== Filmography ==
=== Film director ===
- Undercover (2002)
- Coming-out (2005)
- Mon dernier rôle (2006)
- Hôtel du Cheval blanc (2008)
- Welcome to China (2013)
- The Teacher (2017)

=== Screenwriter ===
- Undercover (2002)
- Coming-out (2005)
- Mon dernier rôle (2006)
- Les Gagnants (2007)
- Hôtel du Cheval blanc (2008)
- Welcome to China (2013)
- The Teacher (2017)
