= I, Cesar =

- Film poster
- Directed by: Richard Berry
- Written by: Éric Assous; Richard Berry
- Produced by: Michel Feller
- Starring: Jules Sitruk; Mabô Kouyaté
- Cinematography: Thomas Hardmeier
- Music by: Reno Isaac
- Distributed by: EuropaCorp. Distribution
- Release date: 9 April 2003
- Running time: 91 minutes
- Country: France
- Language: French
- Budget: $6 million
- Box office: $6.8 million

I, Cesar (French: Moi César, 10 ans ½, 1m39) is a 2003 French comedy film directed by Richard Berry.

== Plot ==
César is a young boy living in Montmartre, Paris, with his parents. Morgan, his friend, tries to find his father in London. César accompanies him in his quest, with another friend, the prettiest girl in the school, Sarah, who speaks English.

== Cast ==
- Jules Sitruk as César Petit
- Mabô Kouyaté as Morgan Boulanger
- Joséphine Berry as Sarah Delgado
- Maria de Medeiros as Chantal Petit
- Jean-Philippe Écoffey as Bertrand Petit
- Anna Karina as Gloria
- Jean Benguigui as Papy
- Murray Head as Charley Fitzpatrick
- Jean-Paul Rouve as The gym teacher
- Catherine Hosmalin as The baker
- Guilaine Londez as The teacher
