= The Teacher (2017 film) =

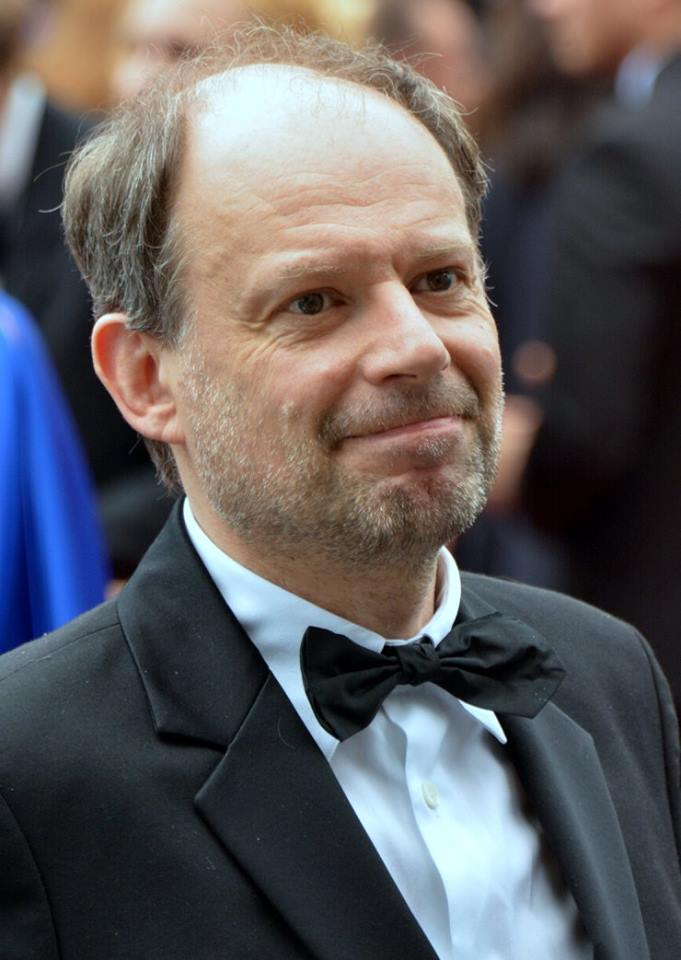
- D. Podalydès as François Foucault
- Directed by: Olivier Ayache-Vidal
- Screenplay by: Olivier Ayache-Vidal
- Produced by: Alain Benguigui; Thomas Verhaeghe
- Starring: Denis Podalydès; Abdoulaye Diallo
- Cinematography: David Cailley
- Edited by: Alexis Mallard
- Music by: Florian Cornet; Gadou Naudin
- Production companies: Sombrero Films; France 3 Cinéma
- Distributed by: BAC Films
- Release date: 13 September 2017
- Running time: 106 minutes
- Country: France
- Language: French
- Budget: $3.8 million
- Box office: $2.5 million

The Teacher (French: Les Grands Esprits) is a 2017 French film written and directed by Olivier Ayache-Vidal in his feature-length directorial debut. It stars Denis Podalydès.

== Synopsis ==
One day, when he declares that only an experienced teacher should be sent to schools in disadvantaged neighborhoods, François Foucault, himself a teacher in letters in the prestigious Henri IV French high school, is overheard by a representative of the Ministry of Education. He is then compelled to leave his posh school in Paris and go to the suburbs, in the “Barbara” High School of Stains, an institution with a bad reputation.

== Cast ==
- Denis Podalydès as François Foucault
- Abdoulaye Diallo as Seydou
- Tabono Tandia as Maya
- Pauline Huruguen as Chloé, François' colleague
- Alexis Moncorgé as Gaspard, Chloé's partner
- Charles Templon as Sébastien
- Léa Drucker as Caroline, François' sister
- Zineb Triki as Agathe
- Mona Magdy Fahim as Rim
- Emmanuel Barrouyer as the school principal
- François Petit-Perrin as Rémi
- Jean-Pierre Lorit as the Ministry of Education Official
- Marie-Julie Baup as the doctor at the Hospital
- Cheick Sylla as Marvin
- Marie Rémond as Camille
- Laurent Claret as Pierre Foucault
- Émilie Gavois-Kahn as The maid

== About the film ==
- Denis Podalydès, who stars as a teacher in this film, also worked in the education sector for the movie Le Temps des porte-plumes by Daniel Duval (2006), where he was an elementary school teacher.

== Soundtrack ==
The film's original soundtrack:

- Glad I Waited - Polly Gibbons / Donald Black & Alexander Rudd
- Who Knows - Marion Black
- Peer Gynt - Edvard Grieg
- Perhaps, Perhaps, Perhaps - Doris Day / Osvaldo Farres
- The Mole Man - Schwab
- VB Drop - Ronald Fritz & JOAT
- Digital Sunset Funk - Gary Royant
- Uptown Girl - David Lynch
- Bump Bump - Charles Kendall Gillette
- 100 days, 100 Nights - Sharon Jones & The Dap-Kings
- Hipster Shakes – Black Pistol Fire
- Si maman si - France Gall / Michel Berger
- Those Were The Days - Mary Hopkin

== See also ==
- The Class
