= Mathieu Madénian =

French writer and actor (born 1976)

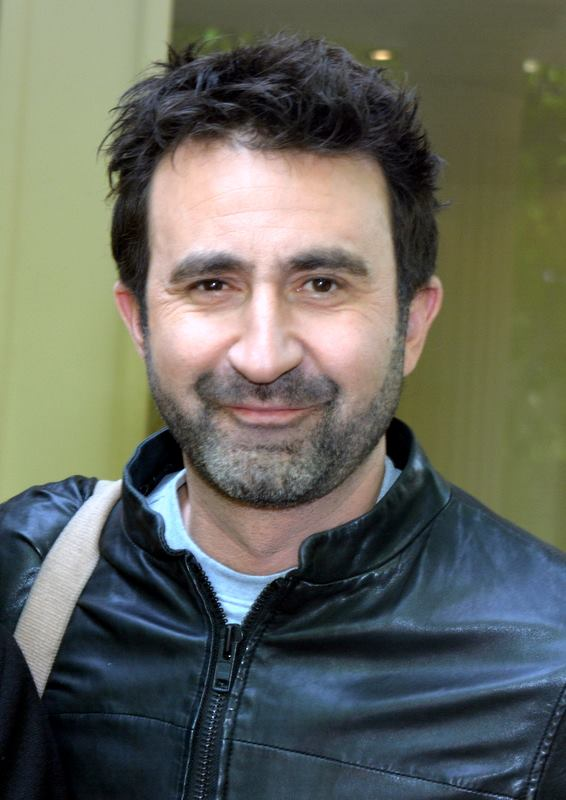
- Born: 23 July 1976 (age 49); Perpignan, Pyrénées-Orientales, France
- Occupations: Humorist; Actor; Columnist
- Website: mathieumadenian.com

Mathieu Madénian (born 23 July 1976) is a French comedian, actor and columnist.

== Life and career ==
Madénian was born in Perpignan, France . He is of Armenian and German descent. He grew up in Saleilles, a town in the suburbs of Perpignan, where he earned his scientific baccalaureate, with honors, then he received a degree in criminology and became a lawyer. When he was 25 he left his law profession to follow a career in comedy

He landed his first role in Un gars, une fille where he performed various voiceovers alongside Jean Dujardin and his wife Alexandra Lamy. He then wrote several one-man shows staged by Kader Aoun, many of which were performed at the théâtre du Point-Virgule.

Since September 2010, he has been a part of the French television show, Vivement dimanche prochain, presented by Michel Drucker. He has a humor column that alternates with Anne Roumanoff, Nicolas Canteloup, or Éric Antoine.

From 2010 to 2011, he was also involved in Le Grand Direct des Médias with Jean-Marc Morandini shown on Europe 1.

Since September 2011, he has been a columnist on Michel Druckers show Faites entrer l'invité on Europe 1.

On 7 January 2015 Madénian did not go to work and escaped the shooting at the offices of the satirical weekly Charlie Hebdo.

== Cinema ==
- 2014: Les Gazelles directed by Mona Achache
- 2016: Roommates Wanted directed by François Desagnat
- 2016: Marseille directed by Kad Merad

== Television ==
- 2001–2004: Un gars, une fille with Jean Dujardin and Alexandra Lamy (Voiceover)
- 2005: Attention ça tourne (Chroniqueur et Auteur)
- 2007: Jamel Comedy Club Season 2 presented by Jamel Debbouze on Canal + (Actor)
- 2007: Les Agités du bocal presented by Alexis Trégarot and Stéphane Blakowski on France 4 (Columnist and Author)
- 2008: Pliés en 4 presented by Cyril Hanouna on France 4 (Columnist and Author)
- 2009: L'habit ne fait pas Lemoine presented by Jean-Luc Lemoine (Columnist and Author)
- 2010: Vivement Dimanche presented by Michel Drucker on France 2 (Columnist and Author)
- 2011: La Pire Semaine de ma Vie directed by Frédéric Auburtin et released on M6 (Actor)
- 2011: À la maison pour Noël directed by Christian Merret-Palmair and released soon on France 2 (Actor)
- 2019: Infidèle as Castain

== Radio ==
- 2007: Made in Blagues on Rire et Chansons
- 2009: Nouveaux Talents on Rire et Chansons
- 2010: Europe 1 Soir of Nicolas Demorand on Europe 1 (Columnist and Author)
- 2010–2011: Le Grand direct|Le Grand direct des Médias of Jean Marc Morandini on Europe 1 (Columnist and Author)
- 2011: Faites entrer l'invité of Michel Drucker on Europe 1

== Theatre ==
- 2004–2005: Tout va bien se passer at Café Théâtre La Providence
- 2006–2008: L'Amour en Kit at Théâtre des Blancs-Manteaux, then at Théâtre du Temple
- 2008: La Route du Rire First part of Anne Roumanoff, Titoff, Anthony Kavanagh, Patrick Bosso, Gérald Dahan, Jean-Luc Lemoine...
- 2009: Stand Up at Café Théâtre Le Panam
- 2010–2011: One Man Show at Théâtre du Point Virgule (Staged by Kader Aoun)
- 2011–2012: One Man Show at Théâtre Trévise (Staged by Kader Aoun)
