= Le Mozart des pickpockets =

Le Mozart des Pickpockets
- Film poster
- Directed by: Philippe Pollet-Villard
- Written by: Philippe Pollet-Villard
- Produced by: Antoine Gandaubert; Fabrice Goldstein; Antoine Rein
- Starring: Matteo Razzouki-Safardi; Philippe Pollet-Villard
- Cinematography: Philippe Piffeteau
- Edited by: Cyril Nakache
- Release date: 14 May 2006
- Running time: 31 minutes
- Country: France
- Language: French

Le Mozart des pickpockets (also known as The Mozart of Pickpockets) is a 2006 French short film. Written and directed by Philippe Pollet-Villard, it won the 2007 Oscar for Best Live Action Short Film. In 2008, the film won the César Award for Best Short Film.

== Cast ==
- Matteo Razzouki-Safardi as L'enfant
- Philippe Pollet-Villard as Philippe
- Richard Morgiève as Richard
- Samir Guesmi as Ahmed, le réceptionniste
- Emiliano Suarez as Max
- Jean Sarguera as Pickpocket 1
- Jean Camaccio as Pickpocket 2

== Plot ==
Richard and Philippe live hand to mouth, backing up a gang of Romanian pickpockets on the streets of Paris, posing as policemen who arrest a gang member while the others rifle the pockets and purses of gawkers. When all of the gang except Richard and Philippe are pinched, things look grim.

Then, Richard insists that they take in a wide-eyed immigrant lad, a deaf-mute left behind in the arrests. Philippe suggests a three-person pickpocket trick, using the boy, but when that goes spectacularly badly, they hit rock bottom.

== Production ==
Le Mozart des pickpockets is a short film written and directed by Philippe Pollet-Villard.

== Accolades ==
The film won the 2007 Academy Award for Best Live Action Short Film. It was the only French submission in the category.

In 2008, it won the César Award for Best Short Film at the 33rd César Awards.
