= Joséphine (2013 film) =

- Theatrical release poster
- Directed by: Agnès Obadia
- Written by: Agnès Obadia; Samantha Mazeras; Pénélope Bagieu
- Based on: Joséphine by Pénélope Bagieu
- Produced by: Romain Rojtman; Benjamin Hess
- Starring: Marilou Berry
- Cinematography: Romain Winding
- Edited by: Anny Danché
- Music by: Marc Chouarain
- Production company: Les Films du 24
- Distributed by: UGC Distribution
- Release dates: 12 June 2013 (Cabourg); 19 June 2013 (France)
- Running time: 88 minutes
- Country: France
- Language: French
- Budget: $8.8 million
- Box office: $4.7 million

Joséphine is a 2013 French romantic comedy film directed by Agnès Obadia. The story is adapted from the French comic of the same name by Pénélope Bagieu. A sequel, Joséphine s'arrondit, was released on 10 February 2016.

== Plot ==
30-year-old Joséphine is single, lives with her cat Brad Pitt and is looking for the man of her dreams. During a family meal, her younger sister, Diane, who seems perfect in every way, announces her future marriage: this is the straw that breaks the camel's back for Joséphine, who has not got a man in her life. Jealous, she claims she is marrying Marcelo, a Brazilian surgeon, and will live with him in his country. Joséphine's lies then start to spiral, producing life-changing outcomes.

Alexandra, the head of her company's human resources, overhears a conversation between Joséphine and her friend Chloe and, having been hired to drive a wave of layoffs, jumps at the chance to fire Joséphine. Joséphine's friends buy her a plane ticket to Brazil. Just before the plane's departure, Joséphine suffers a panic attack and is taken to the hospital, unbeknownst to her friends and family, whilst her luggage is misplaced.

Joséphine chooses to continue the deception and decides to hide in her own apartment, which was temporarily loaned by Chloe to their colleague, Gilles. Despite previously finding him tedious and boring, Joséphine gradually falls for him.

The deceit is discovered by Gilles when Joséphine's bag is returned to her apartment. He calls her friends and when Joséphine returns, he confronts her about the lies. Joséphine, through false tears, then claims she came back after Marcelo's death, but Gilles and her friends don't believe the story and leave angrily.

Joséphine confesses her love to Gilles but he refuses to forgive her deception. Joséphine, trying to make a fresh start, decides to interrupt her sister's wedding after discovering that her fiance, Aymeric, cheated. Diane chooses to believe her and they flee the church together.

Meanwhile, Gilles, deciding to forgive Joséphine, goes to her apartment. The door is answered by Julien, an ex-boyfriend of Joséphine, who is staying with Joséphine after being thrown out by his wife. Gilles, assuming Julien and Joséphine are in a relationship, leaves disappointed. When Joséphine learns from Julien about Gilles' visit, she catches up with him in order to convince him of her love. During the credits, it is shown that Joséphine's friends have forgiven her for her lies, and she and Gilles have moved in together.

== Cast ==
- Marilou Berry as Joséphine
- Mehdi Nebbou as Gilles
- Bérengère Krief as Chloé
- Amelle Chahbi as Rose
- Charlie Dupont as Julien
- Alice Pol as Diane
- Bruno Podalydès as the psychologist
- Arben Bajraktaraj as the carney
- Philippe Pollet-Villard as the monk
- Olivier Cruveiller as Joséphine's father
- Françoise Miquelis as Joséphine's mother
- Claudine Baschet as Mamita
- Cyril Guei as Cyril
- Caroline Anglade as Alexandra
- Valentin Merlet as Aymeric
- Edson Rodrigues as Marcelo

== Sequel ==
A sequel was announced after the success of the film in France, to be directed by Marilou Berry who also stars in the lead role. Joséphine s'arrondit follows the adventures of a slightly older and pregnant Joséphine, who finally found her "perfect man". It was screened on 15 January 2016 at the Festival International du Film de l'Alpe d'Huez ("International Festival of film of l'Alpe d'Huez") before its general release on 10 February 2016.
