= Jules Sitruk =

French actor (born 1990)

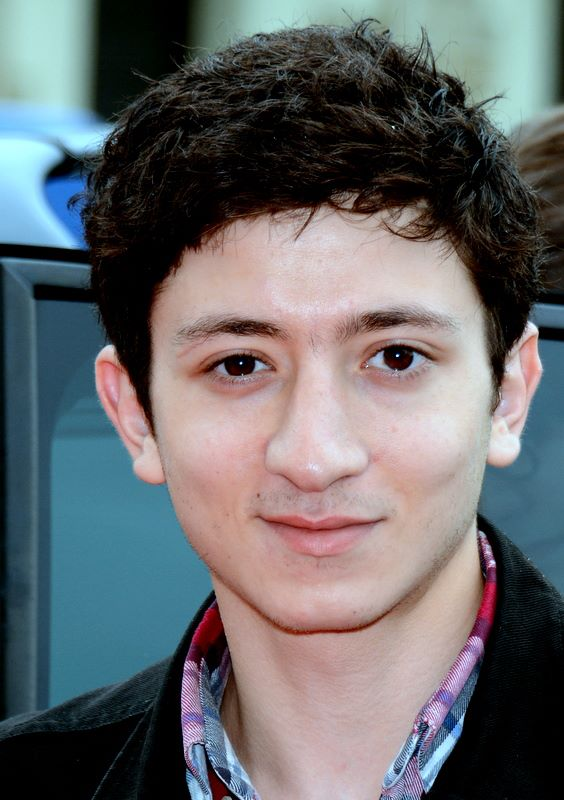
- Born: 16 April 1990 (age 36); Les Lilas, Paris, France
- Occupation: Actor
- Years active: 1998-present
- Father: Claude Sitruk
- Relatives: Joseph Sitruk, Olivier Sitruk

Jules Sitruk (born 16 April 1990 in Lilas, near Paris) is a French actor, most widely known for his roles in the 2002 Jugnot film Monsieur Batignole and the 2007 Hammer & Tongs film Son of Rambow.

Sitruk began acting at the age of 8, after being cast at his hairdressers. His first feature film was Monsieur Batignole (2001) with Gérard Jugnot, who acknowledged his talent amongst other young French actors at the time. Other films include Moi César (2003), Vipère au poing (2004) and Les Aiguilles rouges (2005).

Sitruk is also one of the three narrators in the original first-person version of March of the Penguins. His first English-language film was Son of Rambow, filmed in London in 2006.

In 2018, he starred in Garth Davis's historic film Marie Madeleine.

== Personal life ==
Sitruk is Jewish. He is related to the comedian Olivier Sitruk. Jules has studied Literature Baccalaureate at the Lycée Général of Paris, after completing his time at the Young School of Acting.

== Filmography ==
Year	Title	Role
2018	Mary Magdalene	Aaron
2015	Parfaite	Vincent
2013	Bob & les Sex Pistaches	Bob
2012	Le Fils de l'Autre	Joseph Silberg
2011	French Exchange	Hugo
2011	Mon père est femme de ménage	Rudy
2011	15 Lads (Nos résistances)	Peigne
2009	Une nuit qu'il était à se morfondre...	Lucien
2007	Son of Rambow	Didier Revol
2005	March of the Penguins	Le Bebe
2005	Les aiguilles rouges	Luc
2004	Viper in the Fist	Jean Rézeau
2003	I, Cesar	César Petit
2002	Haute Pierre	Winston/Léonard
2002	Monsieur Batignole	Simon Bernstein
2001	Sauveur Giordano	Robin
2001	Le pain	Le fils
2001	Docteur Sylvestre	Charles
2000	Without Family (TV movie)	Rémi
2000	C.I.D. (India TV series)	Un enfant
1999	L'ange tombé du ciel	Louis

== Awards ==
Sitruk has won the Best Actor ifab Award at the 2015 International Film Awards Berlin
