= Isabelle Candelier =

French film and television actress

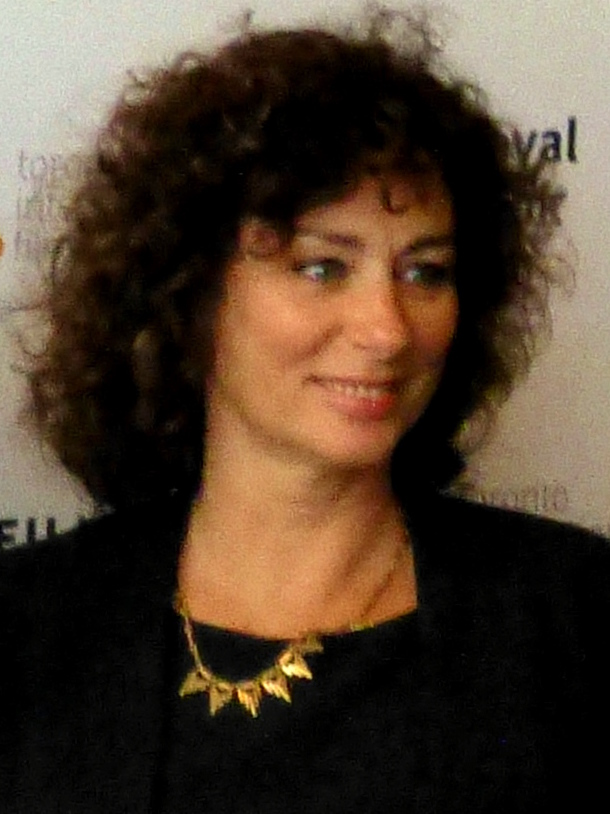
- Born: 12 June 1963 (age 63); Albi, France
- Occupation: Actress
- Years active: 1985–present

Isabelle Candelier (born 12 June 1963) is a French film and television actress.

== Biography ==
Isabelle Candelier made her stage debut at the Montpellier Conservatory under Michel Touraille, then continued her training in Paris at the Conservatoire National Supérieur d'Art Dramatique. From 1986, she worked in theaters directed by Jacques Nichet and Jean-Pierre Vincent. On stage, she met Michel Vuillermoz and the brothers Denis and Bruno Podalydès. When Bruno Podalydès moved on to directing for the cinema, Isabelle Candelier was included in the cast of most of his films: from the short film Versailles Rive-Gauche in 1992 to Bécassine in 2018, including Dieu seul me voit (Versailles-Chantiers) and Le Mystère de la chambre jaune. In 1996, she co-wrote and performed the play André le magnifique, which was made into a film three years later. Denis Podalydès and Michel Vuillermoz were also involved. From then on, her film and TV roles became more important, and she worked with Pascal Thomas, Philippe Lioret and Jean Becker.

== Filmography ==
| Year | Title | Role | Director | Notes |
|---|---|---|---|---|
| 1985 | L'histoire en marche: Le serment | Clothilde | Roger Kahane | TV movie |
| 1986 | On a volé Charlie Spencer! | | Francis Huster | |
| 1987 | Qui sont mes juges? | | André Thiéry | |
| 1989 | Moitié-moitié | Nadine | Paul Boujenah | |
| 1989 | Chimère | The colleague | Claire Devers | |
| 1989 | À corps et à cris | Laura | Josée Dayan | TV movie |
| 1990 | S.O.S. disparus | | Pierre Boutron | TV mini-series (1 episode) |
| 1992 | Versailles Rive-Gauche | Claire | Bruno Podalydès | Short |
| 1992 | Le JAP, juge d'application des peines | Nathalie | Josée Dayan (2) | TV series (1 episode) |
| 1992 | La Fille de l'air | Jacqueline | Maroun Bagdadi | |
| 1993 | Coma | Mina | Denys Granier-Deferre | |
| 1993 | Couples et amants | Sandra | John Lvoff | |
| 1995 | Les truffes | Huguette | Bernard Nauer | |
| 1995 | L'impossible Monsieur Papa | Florence | Denys Granier-Deferre (2) | TV movie |
| 1995 | Panne de pointeuse | Woman in pink | Philippe Dorison | TV Short |
| 1995 | Le homard | Gilberte | Artus de Penguern | Short |
| 1996 | Des nouvelles du bon Dieu | Edwarda | Didier Le Pêcheur | |
| 1996 | Julie Lescaut | Laurence | Josée Dayan (3) | TV series (1 episode) |
| 1996 | La femme de la forêt | Noémie Curcher | Arnaud Sélignac | TV mini-series |
| 1997 | Droit dans le mur | Béatrice | Pierre Richard | |
| 1998 | Dieu seul me voit | Sophie | Bruno Podalydès (2) | |
| 1999 | Le créateur | The journalist | Albert Dupontel | |
| 1999 | Un pur moment de rock'n roll | Claire | Manuel Boursinhac | |
| 2000 | André le magnifique | Jeanine | Emmanuel Silvestre, Thibault Staib | |
| 2000 | Deuxième vie | Sonia | Patrick Braoudé | |
| 2000 | Lise et André | Lise | Denis Dercourt | |
| 2001 | Mademoiselle | Alice Cohen | Philippe Lioret | |
| 2001 | Day Off | Vitalie Rambaud | Pascal Thomas | |
| 2001 | J'ai faim !!! | Corinne | Florence Quentin | |
| 2001 | Being Light | Vanessa | Pascal Arnold, Jean-Marc Barr | |
| 2001 | Les rencontres de Joëlle | Joëlle Vidalon | Patrick Poubel | TV movie |
| 2001 | Le coeur sur la main | The owner | Marie-Anne Chazel | Short |
| 2002 | Caméra Café | | | TV series (1 episode) |
| 2002 | Notre père | | Estelle Larrivaz | Short |
| 2003 | Le pacte du silence | The psychiatrist | Graham Guit | |
| 2003 | Effroyables jardins | Louise | Jean Becker | |
| 2003 | Maigret | Louise | Jacques Fansten | TV series (1 episode) |
| 2003 | The Mystery of the Yellow Room | Madame Bernier | Bruno Podalydès (3) | |
| 2005 | The Perfume of the Lady in Black | Madame Bernier | Bruno Podalydès (4) | |
| 2006 | A Good Year | Ludivine Duflot | Ridley Scott | |
| 2006 | Que sont-ils devenus? | The Hollywood Actress | Bruno Podalydès (5) | Short |
| 2008 | De nouvelles vies | Isabelle Derain | Stéphane Kurc | TV movie |
| 2009 | Park Benches | The lefted woman | Bruno Podalydès (6) | |
| 2009 | Pour ma fille | Louise | Claire de la Rochefoucauld | TV movie |
| 2010 | Les Petits Meurtres d'Agatha Christie | Christine Boisseau | Eric Woreth | TV series (1 episode) |
| 2011 | Voie rapide | Marthe | Christophe Sahr | |
| 2011 | Louis XVI, l'homme qui ne voulait pas être roi | Madame Necker | Thierry Binisti | TV movie |
| 2012 | Nos retrouvailles | Valérie Féraud | Josée Dayan (4) | TV movie |
| 2012 | Granny's Funeral | Hélène Lebrecq | Bruno Podalydès (7) | |
| 2013 | Lanester | Dr. Jacynthe Bergeret | Franck Mancuso | TV movie |
| 2013 | Délit de fuite | Francine | Thierry Binisti (2) | TV movie |
| 2014 | Libre et assoupi | Sébastien's mother | Benjamin Guedj | |
| 2014 | Belle comme la femme d'un autre | Sophie Liancourt | Catherine Castel | |
| 2014 | Get Well Soon | Claudine Laurent | Jean Becker (2) | |
| 2014 | Gemma Bovery | Valérie Joubert | Anne Fontaine | |
| 2014 | Desire to Sleep | Woman | Venla Mäkelä | Short |
| 2015 | I Kissed a Girl | Françoise Deprez | Maxime Govare, Noémie Saglio | |
| 2015 | Valentin Valentin | Rose | Pascal Thomas (2) | |
| 2015–present | Call My Agent ! | Annick Valentini | Cédric Klapisch, Lola Doillon, ... | TV series (5 episodes) |
| 2016 | Cézanne and I | Emilie Zola | Danièle Thompson | |
| 2017 | Bloody Milk | Madame Chavanges | Hubert Charuel | |
| 2018 | Bécassine | Madeleine | Bruno Podalydès | |
