= The First Time I Turned Twenty =

- Theatrical release poster
- La Première fois que j'ai eu 20 ans
- Directed by: Lorraine Lévy
- Written by: Lorraine Lévy
- Based on: La Première fois que j'ai eu seize ans by Susie Morgenstern
- Produced by: Hélène Delale; Bruno Pésery
- Starring: Marilou Berry; Catherine Jacob; Serge Riaboukine
- Cinematography: Emmanuel Soyer
- Edited by: Sophie Reine
- Music by: Sébastien Souchois
- Production companies: Arena Films; France 3 Cinéma; Arcade; SFP
- Distributed by: Pathé
- Release date: 6 October 2004
- Running time: 98 minutes
- Country: France
- Language: French
- Budget: $4.4 million
- Box office: $984.000

The First Time I Turned Twenty (original title: La Première fois que j'ai eu 20 ans) is a 2004 French comedy film directed and written by Lorraine Lévy.

== Plot ==
The action takes place in the early 1960s in the Paris suburbs. Hannah Goldman (Marilou Berry), sixteen and Jewish, has two ‘very attractive’ sisters and parents who love her. But she is not happy, feeling herself ugly due to being overweight, and she deeply nourishes a terrible complex at the beauty of her sisters and that of her school friend. But Hannah has two great qualities her sisters admit to both not possessing and envying: she's smart, and she has a talent for music.

Aiming for a career in music, she chooses the double bass, an instrument she feels reflects her, though it has traditionally been associated with male players. Her willingness to challenge convention extends further: she hopes to join her high school jazz band. This year, the band needs a new bassist. The ensemble, long directed by the high school music teacher, has never included a woman, and the bass position has usually been held by a male student. Her interest in the role therefore challenges established expectations and draws strong reactions from some of the boys at school.

In the selection contest, she performs a benefit much higher than that of the only other competitor. She wins the selection competition, to the delight of her family. Except her four musician comrades, deeply misogynist, are very attached to the male tradition of their training,trying everything to discourage it. Beginning immediately by reminding her that she is a woman, and that they do not want a woman in their training. They harass her in order to gradually undermine her morale. They go one evening to plot a sinister Nazi symbol on her scores played during a concert. And they even try to humiliate her by attacking her double bass.

Struggling against the boys' harassment month after month and using all her intelligence and patience, encouraged by her uncle, she eventually wins admiration from part of the group of four boys.

== Cast ==
- Marilou Berry as Hannah Goldman
- Catherine Jacob as Madame Goldman
- Serge Riaboukine as Meyer Goldman
- Pierre Arditi as Uncle Jérémy
- Nathalie Courval as Aunt Lucie
- Myriam Moraly as Judith
- Stéphanie Pasterkamp as Sandra
- Raphaël Personnaz as Louis
- Michel Vuillermoz as M. Conrad
- Laurent Spielvogel as M. Troutman
- Catherine Arditi as Madame Sarah
- Adrien Jolivet as David
- Guillaume Destrem as Jérémy's lover
- Romain Vissol as Jo
- Didier Becchetti as Jip
- Sophie Guiter as Mlle Appelbaum
- Erwan Demaure as Denis
- Renan Mazéas as Emile
- Joséphine Serre as Myriam
- Maroussia Dubreuil as Ruth
- Louis Descols as Robert
- Stéphane Rugraff as Jean-Jean
