= Kafka's Soup =

2005 cookbook by Mark Crick

- Author: Mark Crick
- Illustrator: Mark Crick
- Language: English
- Genre: Cookery/Pastiche
- Publisher: Libri
- Publication date: 2005
- Publication place: United Kingdom
- Pages: 96
- ISBN: 978-1-901965-09-4
- Followed by: Sartre's Sink

Kafka's Soup is a literary pastiche in the form of a cookbook. It contains 14 recipes each written in the style of a famous author from history. As of 2007 it had been translated into 18 languages and published in 27 countries. Excerpts from the book have appeared in the Sydney Morning Herald and the New York Times. Theatrical performances of the recipes have taken place in France and Canada.

== Recipes ==
Recipes include: tiramisu as made by Proust, cheese on toast by Harold Pinter, clafoutis grandmere by Virginia Woolf, chocolate cake prepared by Irvine Welsh, lamb with dill sauce by Raymond Chandler, onion tart by Chaucer, fenkata (rabbit stew) by Homer, boned stuffed poussins by the Marquis de Sade, mushroom risotto by John Steinbeck, tarragon eggs by Jane Austen, Vietnamese chicken by Graham Greene and Kafka's Miso soup. Also included are recipes in the style of Jorge Luis Borges and Gabriel García Márquez.

Among the recipes that did not make the original edition of the book was "plum pudding à la Charles Dickens" which was written but rejected by Mark Crick for being "too long-winded". It was, however, included in a subsequent paperback edition of the book along with two recipes, Rösti à la Thomas Mann and moules marinieres à la Italo Calvino, originally created for the German and Italian translations respectively.

Kafka's Soup is illustrated with paintings by the author in the style of a number of famous artists including Picasso, Matisse, Hogarth, De Chirico, Henry Moore, Egon Schiele and Warhol.

Kafka's Soup is Mark Crick's first book. He has subsequently written two other books with similar themes; Sartre's Sink and Machiavelli's Lawn which are literary pastiches in the form of a DIY handbook and a gardening book respectively.

== Writing Kafka's Soup ==
The idea for Kafka's Soup arose during a conversation between Crick and a publisher. Crick noted his dislike for cookbooks saying that he enjoyed looking at the pictures but found the accompanying text dull. When asked what would it take for him to read beyond the ingredients list he replied: "if [the text] was written by the world's greatest authors." The publisher liked the idea and, in Crick's words, "she said that if I wrote it she'd publish it."

Most of the recipes in the book are Crick's own, although some, such as the chocolate cake, came from his friends. Crick notes the implausibility of some of his authors cooking their stated dishes (for example he states that John Steinbeck "would never have eaten [mushroom risotto]" and "I certainly accept any challenge that Kafka would not have eaten miso soup"). He says that he selected the recipes based on the ability of each dish to allow him to use the language he wished to use. Chocolate cake was selected for Irvine Welsh because "people become terribly selfish when there's chocolate cake around, just as they do with drugs. It's the closest many get to taking heroin."

Crick says that he found Virginia Woolf the most difficult of the authors to write while Raymond Chandler was the easiest.

== Response ==
Kafka's Soup has become a cult hit. Andy Miller of the Telegraph called the recipes "note-perfect parodies of literary greats". Emily Stokes of the Observer called it an "illustrated masterpiece of pastiche" citing the lamb with dill sauce as "particularly good". C J Schüler wrote that Virginia Woolf's clafoutis grandmere is the "pièce de resistance" and called the collection "irresistibly moreish". He later called the book "a little gem of literary impersonation". Schüler believes that "part of the book's appeal lies in the fact that the recipes...actually work." The French writer and satirist Patrick Rambaud has named Kafka's soup as one of his favorite parodies, noting the inclusion of parodies of continental European authors such as Proust and the Marquis de Sade in addition to English-speaking authors.

== Translations ==
As of 2007 Kafka's Soup had been translated into 18 languages and published in 27 countries. The Croatian translation proved more popular than The Da Vinci Code, forcing it into second place on the country's best-seller list. Each recipe in the French version was translated by a separate translator specializing in the translation of the works of the parodied author.

== Theatrical readings ==
In England, the recipes have reportedly been used as audition pieces by a small West Country theatre company. The Théâtre de l'Atelier in Paris hosted a performance of the French translation of the book in 2007. The production included performances by Irène Jacob, Isabelle Carré and Denis Podalydès, including a sung version of the recipe for onion tart. A live reading of the French translation of Kafka's Soup took place at the Montreal Festival International de la Littérature in 2007 with the author in attendance. The production received an additional performance run in the Terrebonne suburb of Montreal in 2009.
