= The Young One (2016 film) =

- Film poster
- Jeunesse
- Directed by: Julien Samani
- Screenplay by: Julien Samani; Camille Fontaine
- Based on: "Youth" by Joseph Conrad
- Produced by: Paulo Branco
- Starring: Kévin Azaïs; Samir Guesmi; Jean-François Stévenin
- Cinematography: Simon Beaufils
- Edited by: Julie Dupré
- Music by: Ullysse Klotz
- Production companies: Alfama Films Production; Leopardo Filmes
- Distributed by: Alfama Films (France)
- Release dates: 10 August 2016 (Locarno); 7 September 2016 (France)
- Running time: 83 minutes
- Countries: France; Portugal
- Language: French
- Budget: €1.8 million

The Young One (original title: Jeunesse) is a 2016 French-Portuguese film directed by Julien Samani and produced by Paulo Branco. The film is based on the 1898 short story "Youth" by Joseph Conrad. The film premiered at the 2016 Locarno International Film Festival, where it competed for the Golden Leopard.

== Cast ==
- Kévin Azaïs as Zico
- Samir Guesmi as José Géraud
- Jean-François Stévenin as Captain Paillet
- Bastien Ughetto as Yoyo
- Camille Polet as Mélanie
- Lazare Minoungou as Moctar
- David Chour as Kong
- Miguel Borges as Pedro
- António Simão as Lionel
