= The New Adventures of Cinderella =

- Directed by: Lionel Steketee
- Written by: Daive Cohen
- Produced by: Daniel Tordjman; Jérôme Seydoux
- Starring: Marilou Berry; Josiane Balasko; Arnaud Ducret; Didier Bourdon; Jérôme Commandeur
- Cinematography: Stéphane Le Parc
- Edited by: Frédérique Olszak
- Music by: Maxime Desprez; Michaël Tordjman
- Production company: 74 films
- Distributed by: Pathé
- Release date: 18 October 2017
- Running time: 90 minutes
- Country: France
- Language: French
- Box office: $6.5 million

The New Adventures of Cinderella (Les Nouvelles Aventures de Cendrillon) is a 2017 French comedy film directed by Lionel Steketee.

== Cast ==
- Marilou Berry as Cinderella / Julie
- Arnaud Ducret as Prince Marco
- Josiane Balasko as Josépha
- Didier Bourdon as The King
- Vincent Desagnat as Prince Gilbert
- Jérôme Commandeur as The Duke
- Josephine Draï as Javotte / Bianca
- Camille Verschuere as Anastasia / Anissa
- Andy Cocq as The Godmother
- Milo Mazé as Alex
- Natoo as Virgin Girl
- Anaïs Delva as Natural Girl
- Gianni Giardinelli as Angry Dwarf

== Production ==
The filming began at the end of August 2016.
