= The Other Son (2012 film) =

- Film poster
- Directed by: Lorraine Lévy
- Produced by: Virginie Lacombe; Raphael Berdugo
- Starring: Emmanuelle Devos; Pascal Elbé; Jules Sitruk; Mehdi Dehbi; Areen Omari; Khalifa Natour
- Cinematography: Emmanuel Soyer
- Edited by: Sylvie Gadmer
- Music by: Dhafer Youssef
- Production company: Rapsodie Production
- Distributed by: Haut et Court
- Release dates: 23 March 2012 (Alès Film Festival); 4 April 2012 (France)
- Running time: 110 minutes
- Country: France
- Languages: French; Hebrew; Arabic; English
- Budget: $2.7 million
- Box office: $4.2 million

The Other Son (original title: Le Fils de l'Autre) is a 2012 French drama film directed by Lorraine Lévy.

== Plot ==
The film centers on Joseph Silberg (Jules Sitruk), who is about to turn 18 years old and serve in the Israeli Defense Forces. During routine tests, his family discovers his blood type is different from theirs. Through further testing, including DNA testing, the family discovers that Joseph is not their son.

An investigation is conducted by the hospital Joseph was born in. Due to a bombing attack that occurred on the night he was born, Joseph and another baby were taken to shelters for safety and switched by mistake. The hospital administrator contacts the family of the other baby, who happen to be Palestinian. Their baby, Yacine Al Bezaaz, was born on the same night.

The story develops reflecting the issues of the Israeli–Palestinian conflict in which both fathers are reluctant to accept the situation while the mothers are more open to the possibility of becoming close with their biological children. As the boys become friends, their families have to re-evaluate their beliefs and xenophobia prior to connecting with their true identity.

== Cast ==
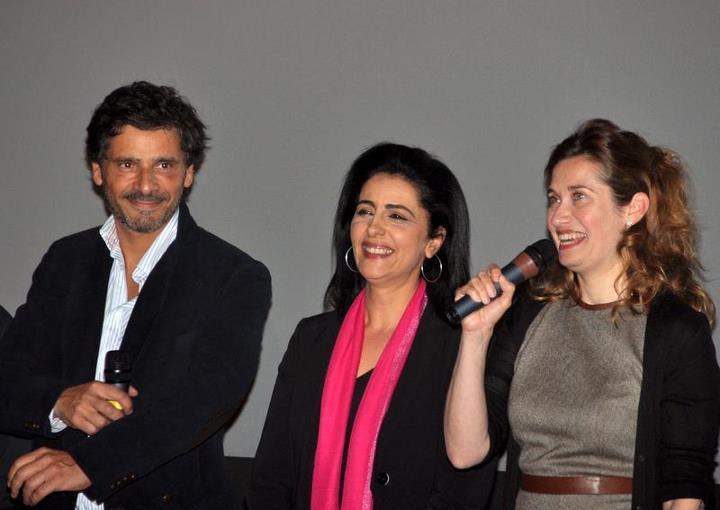
Pascal Elbé, Areen Omari and Emmanuelle Devos at a preview of The Other Son.

- Emmanuelle Devos as Orith Silberg
- Pascal Elbé as Alon Silberg
- Jules Sitruk as Joseph Silberg
- Mehdi Dehbi as Yacine Al Bezaaz
- Areen Omari as Leïla Al Bezaaz
- Khalifa Natour as Saïd Al Bezaaz
- Mahmud Shalaby as Bilal Al Bezaaz
- Diana Zriek as Amina
- Marie Wisselmann as Keren
- Bruno Podalydès as David
- Ezra Dagan as the rabbi
- Tamar Shem Or as Yona
- Tomer Offner as Ilan
- Noa Manor as Ethel
- Shira Naor as Lisa
- Gilles Ben David as hospital director

== See also ==
- Kleinruppin Forever (2004 film)
