= The Sweet Escape (film) =

- Film poster
- Directed by: Bruno Podalydès
- Written by: Bruno Podalydès
- Produced by: Pascal Caucheteux
- Starring: Bruno Podalydès; Sandrine Kiberlain; Agnès Jaoui; Vimala Pons
- Cinematography: Claire Mathon
- Edited by: Christel Dewynter
- Production companies: Why Not Productions; France 3 Cinéma
- Distributed by: UGC Distribution
- Release date: 10 June 2015
- Running time: 104 minutes
- Country: France
- Language: French
- Budget: $4 million
- Box office: $2.5 million

The Sweet Escape (French title: Comme un avion) is a 2015 French comedy film written, directed by and starring Bruno Podalydès. The film also stars Sandrine Kiberlain, Agnès Jaoui and Vimala Pons.

== Premise ==
A fifty-something graphics artist has always dreamed of flying an airmail plane. One day he assembles a kayak which he thinks looks like fuselage, and set off on a trip to unexpected encounters.

== Cast ==
- Bruno Podalydès as Michel
- Sandrine Kiberlain as Rachelle
- Agnès Jaoui as Laëtitia
- Vimala Pons as Mila
- Denis Podalydès as Rémi
- Michel Vuillermoz as Christophe
- Noémie Lvovsky as Madame Pirchtate
- Benjamin Lavernhe as Bernard
- Jean-Noël Brouté as Damien
- Pierre Arditi as a fisherman
- Samir Guesmi as the deliveryman

== Accolades ==
Award / Film Festival	Category	Recipients and nominees	Result
César Awards	Best Supporting Actress	Agnès Jaoui	Pending
Louis Delluc Prize	Best Film		Nominated
Prix Jacques Prévert du Scénario	Best Original Screenplay	Bruno Podalydès	Nominated
