= Quand on crie au loup =

2019 French comedy film

- Directed by: Marilou Berry
- Written by: Marilou Berry; Nicolas Bary; Daniel Brunet; Robert Hospyan; Nicolas Peufaillit; Jean-André Yerlès
- Produced by: Thomas Langmann; Nathanaël La Combe
- Starring: Marilou Berry; Gérard Jugnot
- Cinematography: Christophe Graillot
- Edited by: Thibaut Damade
- Music by: Erwann Chandon
- Production companies: La Petite Reine; Wonder Films
- Distributed by: Paradis Films
- Release date: 3 July 2019
- Running time: 83 minutes
- Country: France
- Language: French

Quand on crie au loup is a 2019 French comedy film directed by Marilou Berry.

== Cast ==
- Noé Wodecki as Victor Bogomil
- Gérard Jugnot as Joseph Bogomil
- Constance Ollé as Lorraine
- Marilou Berry as Romane
- Bérengère Krief as Pauline Pividale
- Nicolas Wanczycki as Wallace
- Thomas Vandenberghe as Jasper
- Julien Boisselier as Monsieur Martin
- Anne Girouard as Madame Martin
- Gustave Klépal as Georges

== Production ==
Marilou Berry was 8 months pregnant when she directed the movie. She shot her scenes as an actress first. She was on a wheelchair on the set for the last weeks.
