= Roommates Wanted =

- Theatrical release poster
- Directed by: François Desagnat
- Written by: Jérôme Corcos; François Desagnat; Catherine Diament; Richard Pezet; Romain Protat
- Produced by: Jérôme Corcos; Antoine Pezet
- Starring: André Dussollier; Bérengère Krief; Arnaud Ducret; Julia Piaton
- Cinematography: Vincent Gallot
- Edited by: Beatrice Herminie
- Production companies: TF1 Films Production; SND Films; Nac Films; Someci; Orange Studio
- Distributed by: SND Films
- Release date: 20 April 2016 (France)
- Running time: 97 minutes
- Country: France
- Language: French
- Budget: $6 million
- Box office: $8.4 million

Roommates Wanted (original title: Adopte un veuf meaning Adopt a Widower) is a 2016 French comedy film directed by François Desagnat.

== Plot ==
When you're recently widowed, it is difficult to get used to your new life… This is the case with Hubert Jacquin, who spends most of his time in his huge apartment, feeling depressed, staring at his TV set. One day, after a misunderstanding, his life changes. Manuela, a young and bubbly adventurer in search of an apartment, calls to his home. At first reluctant, Hubert quickly gets used to the presence of this energy storm, who even manages to convince two other people to stay: Paul-Gérard, whose wife has left him, and Marion, a hospital nurse. These three roommates cause Hubert many surprises…

== Cast ==
- André Dussollier as Hubert Jacquin
- Bérengère Krief as Manuela Baudry
- Arnaud Ducret as Paul-Gérard Langlois
- Julia Piaton as Marion Legloux
- Nicolas Marié as Samuel Edlemann
- Blanche Gardin as Rose
- Guillaume Delorme as Sébastien
- Mathieu Madénian as Arnaud
- Vincent Desagnat as Roméro
- Audrey Looten as Valérie
- Panayotis Pascot as Julien
