= Kleinruppin Forever =

- Theatrical Poster
- Directed by: Carsten Fiebeler
- Produced by: Dirk Beinhold
- Starring: Tobias Schenke; Anna Brüggemann
- Cinematography: Bernhard Jasper
- Edited by: Antje Zynga
- Distributed by: Senator Film
- Release date: 9 September 2004 (Germany)
- Running time: 103 minutes
- Country: Germany
- Language: German

Kleinruppin forever is a German romantic comedy film, released in late 2004.

The film is set in 1985 and stars Tobias Schenke as Tim Winter, a West German teenager from Bremen with aspirations of being a professional tennis player. On a school trip to East Germany, Tim meets his identical twin brother Ronny (also played by Tobias Schenke). Ronny switches places with Tim, forcing Tim to experience life and love in East Germany.

The film can be seen as part of the Ostalgie movement, similar to the films Good Bye, Lenin! (2003) and Sonnenallee (1999), which look back nostalgically at life in East Germany.

== See also ==
- Le Fils de l'Autre (2012 film)
