= Sartre's Sink =

Literary pastiche

- Author: Mark Crick
- Language: English
- Genre: DIY/Pastiche
- Publisher: Granta
- Publication date: 2008
- Publication place: United Kingdom
- Pages: 98
- ISBN: 978-1-84708-047-9
- Preceded by: Kafka's Soup
- Followed by: Machiavelli's Lawn

Sartre's Sink is a literary pastiche in the form of a do it yourself handbook. It contains advice about how to undertake 14 common household tasks each written in the style of a famous author from history. Sartre's Sink is the second book by photographer and author Mark Crick. Excerpts have appeared in The Independent and the Evening Herald.

The book includes chapters on how to bleed a radiator by Emily Brontë, tile a bathroom by Fyodor Dostoyevsky, hang wallpaper by Hemingway, unblock a sink by Sartre, repair a dripping tap with Marguerite Duras, put up a garden fence with Hunter S Thompson, paint a panelled door with Anaïs Nin, re-glaze a window with Milan Kundera, board an attic with Edgar Allan Poe, loosen a stuck drawer with Samuel Beckett and how to paint a room with Haruki Murakami. Other parodied authors include Goethe and Joseph Conrad. Mark Crick says that he found Dostoyevsky the most difficult author to parody.

As with his previous work, Sartre's Sink is illustrated with paintings by the author in the style of a number of famous artists including van Gogh, Leonardo da Vinci, Picasso, Magritte and Turner.

Carolyn Kellogg of the LA Times noted that the book was "only marginally instructive". The Telegraph felt that the subject matter of Sartre's Sink was "not as interesting" as that of Crick's earlier book Kafka's Soup. However, the editor nonetheless believed that the quality of the pastiche was equal to that of the earlier book calling both books "a gem". Roy Williams of The Australian called it "a minor masterpiece" naming painting the panelled door and putting up the garden fence as his particular favourites. Ian Sansom of The Guardian called it "hands-down droll". Nicolas d'Estienne d'Orves of Le Figaro called it "Irresistible". Sartre's Sink was named Sunday Times humour book of the year 2008.
