= Naked Normandy =

2018 French film

- Directed by: Philippe Le Guay
- Written by: Philippe Le Guay; Olivier Dazat; Victoria Bedos
- Produced by: Anne-Dominique Toussaint
- Starring: François Cluzet; François-Xavier Demaison
- Cinematography: Jean-Claude Larrieu
- Edited by: Monica Coleman
- Music by: Bruno Coulais
- Distributed by: SND Films
- Release date: 10 January 2018
- Running time: 105 minutes
- Country: France
- Language: French
- Box office: $5.4 million

Naked Normandy (French: Normandie nue) is a 2018 French comedy-drama film directed by Philippe Le Guay.

== Cast ==
- François Cluzet - Georges Balbuzard
- François-Xavier Demaison - Thierry Levasseur
- Julie-Anne Roth - Valérie Levasseur
- Pili Groyne - Chloé Levasseur
- Toby Jones - Newman
- Vincent Regan - Bradley
- Colin Bates - Ross
- Arthur Dupont - Vincent Jousselin
- Philippe Rebbot - Eugène
- Patrick d'Assumçao - Maurice
- Grégory Gadebois - Roger
- Philippe Duquesne - Férol
- Gérard Watkins - Volker
- Philippe Pollet-Villard - The camper

== Production ==
Filming mostly took place in the village of Le Mêle-sur-Sarthe, located in the Orne department.
