= Marilou Berry =

French actress, film director and screenwriter

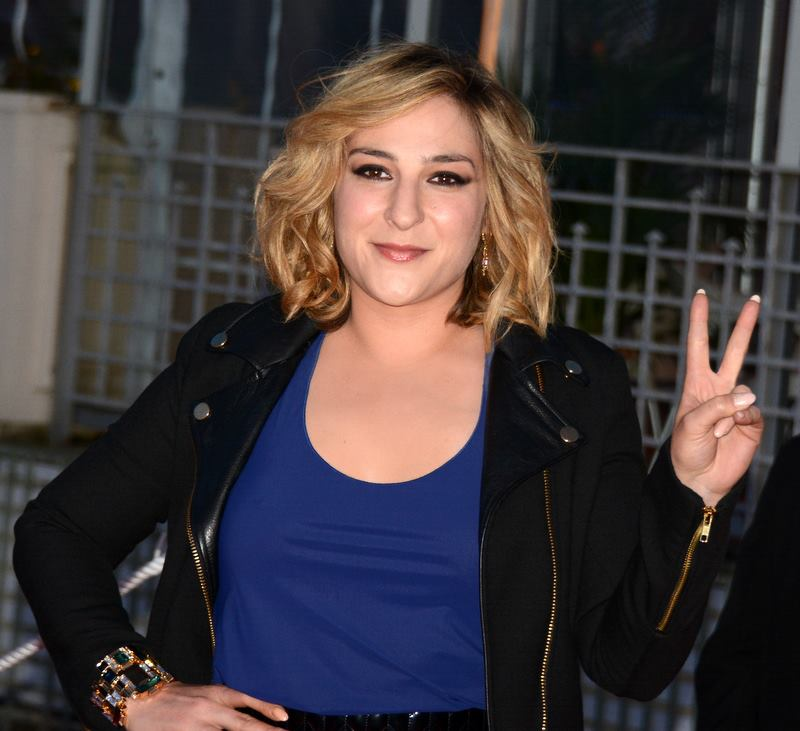
- Berry in June 2013
- Born: 1 February 1983 (age 43); Paris, France
- Occupations: Actress, film director, screenwriter
- Years active: 1989–present
- Children: 1
- Mother: Josiane Balasko
- Relatives: Richard Berry (uncle)

Marilou Berry (born 1 February 1983) is a French actress, film director and screenwriter. She is known for her roles in Look at Me (2004), Vilaine (2008) and The New Adventures of Cinderella (2017).

== Personal life ==
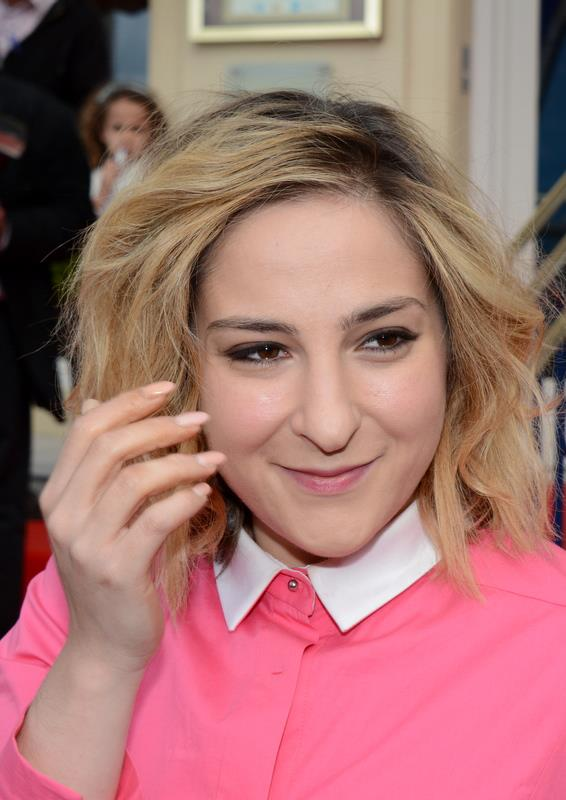
The actress during the 2013 Cabourg Film Festival, for Queens of the Ring.

Marilou Berry was born on 1 February 1983, the daughter of filmmaker Josiane Balasko (née Balašković) and sculptor Philippe Berry (né Benguigui), and the niece of actor Richard Berry. Her mother is of Croatian descent, whereas her father is of Maghrebi Jewish descent. Uninterested in school studies, she left high school and enrolled at the Conservatoire de Paris.

From 2007 to 2010, Berry dated the actor David Rousseau. In 2011, she began a relationship with the young entrepreneur Arnaud Schneider. They separated in January 2017. On 9 June 2017, she was seen during the French Open, with her new boyfriend, Alexis. In July 2018, she announced on her Instagram that she was pregnant with her first child. She gave birth to her son, Andy, in December 2018. He was named after the song Andy by Les Rita Mitsouko.

Berry's father, Philippe, died suddenly on 5 September 2019 at the age of 63.

== Life and career ==
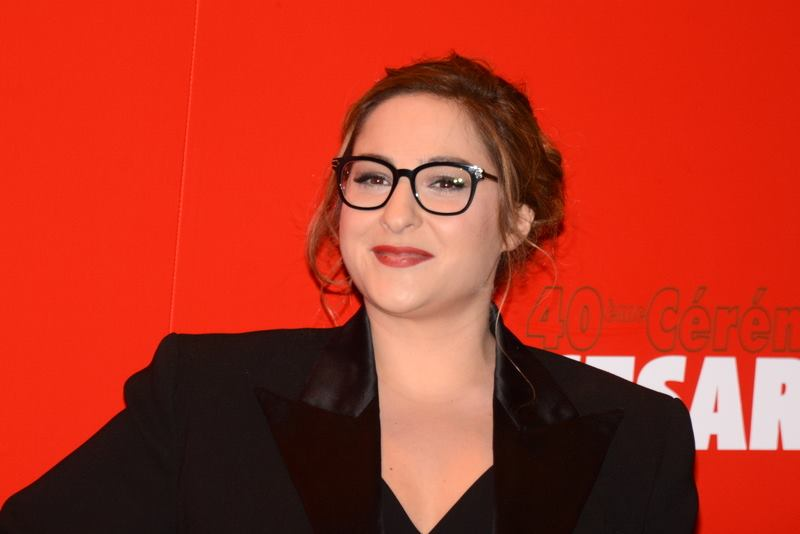
Berry at the 40th César Awards in 2015

Berry made her first appearance on the screen at 8 years old in My Life Is Hell, a comedy directed, written and produced by her mother and co-starring her uncle, Richard Berry.

Berry has had several roles in films as a teenager who finds her salvation in music. As Lolita Cassard in Look at Me (2003), she was a girl crushed by the notoriety of her father, an author, while trying to get him to notice her singing talent. As Hannah Goldman in The first time I turned 20 (2004), she was the only girl in a traditionally all-male school jazz band in 1950s France.

Berry's most recent roles have been comedic, such as Once Upon a Time in the Oued and then Nos jours heureux (Our Happy Days), as well as in The New Adventures of Cinderella.

== Filmography ==
=== Actress ===
==== Cinema ====
Year	Title	Role	Director	Notes
1991	My Life Is Hell	The little girl	Josiane Balasko	
2004	Look at Me	Lolita Cassard	Agnès Jaoui	Chlotrudis Awards – Best Actress; Étoiles d'or du cinéma français – Most Promising Actress; Lumière Award for Most Promising Actress; Nominated – César Award for Most Promising Actress
2004	The First Time I Turned Twenty	Hannah Goldman	Lorraine Lévy	
2005	The Black Box	The receptionist	Richard Berry	
2005	Once Upon a Time in the Oued	Nadège	Djamel Bensalah	
2006	Those Happy Days	Nadine	Éric Toledano & Olivier Nakache	Nominated – NRJ Ciné Award for Best Kiss (with Omar Sy)
2006	Lisa et le pilote d'avion	Corinne	Philippe Barassat	
2006	On ne devrait pas exister	Marilou	Hervé P. Gustave	
2007	Trivial	Fred	Sophie Marceau	
2008	Vilaine	Melanie Lupin	Jean-Patrick Benes & Allan Mauduit	Nominated – César Award for Most Promising Actress
2008	A French Gigolo	Karine	Josiane Balasko	
2008	Sans titre	Her	Valéry Schatz	Short
2009	La marche des crabes	Isabelle	Hafid Aboulahyane	Short
2010	La chair de ma chair	Charlotte	Mallory Grolleau	Short
2011	La croisière	Alix Sainte-Beuve	Pascale Pouzadoux	
2011	Beur sur la ville	Girl with the broken teeth	Djamel Bensalah	
2013	Joséphine	Joséphine	Agnès Obadia	
2013	Queens of the Ring	Rose / Rosa Craft	Jean-Marc Rudnicki	
2015	Valentin Valentin	Elodie	Pascal Thomas	
2016	Joséphine, Pregnant & Fabulous	Josephine	Marilou Berry	
2017	Sous le même toit	Mélissa	Dominique Farrugia	
2017	The New Adventures of Cinderella	Cinderella	Lionel Steketee	
2018	L'école est finie	Diane	Anne Depétrini	
2019	Quand on crie au loup	Romane	Marilou Berry	
2021	Mes très chers enfants	Sandrine Blanc	Alexandra Leclère	
TBA	Doux Jésus	Sister Lucie	Frédéric Quiring	

==== Television ====
Year	Title	Role	Director	Notes
2006	La volière aux enfants	Marie Carpantier	Olivier Guignard	TV movie
2008	Belleville tour	Capucine	Ahmed Bouchaala & Zakia Tahri	TV movie
2010	La plus pire semaine de ma vie	Carla	Frédéric Auburtin	TV series (2 episodes)
2011	Chez Maupassant	Elisabeth Rousset	Philippe Bérenger	TV series (1 episode)
2012	Merlin	Morgane	Stéphane Kappes	TV mini-series
2016	Accused	Chloé Vinati	Mona Achache	TV series (1 episode)
2017	Mystère place Vendôme	Jeanne	Renaud Bertrand	TV movie
2019	Munch	Blanche Braque	Laurent Tuel & Thierry Binisti	TV series (6 episodes)
2021	Mon Ange	Gabrielle Varan	Arnauld Mercadier	TV mini-series
2021–23	Je te promets	Maud	Renaud Bertrand, Marilou Berry, ...	TV series (34 episodes)
2022–24	Marianne	Marianne Vauban	Alexandre Charlot, Franck Magnier & Myriam Vinocour	TV series (12 episodes)

=== Director / Writer ===
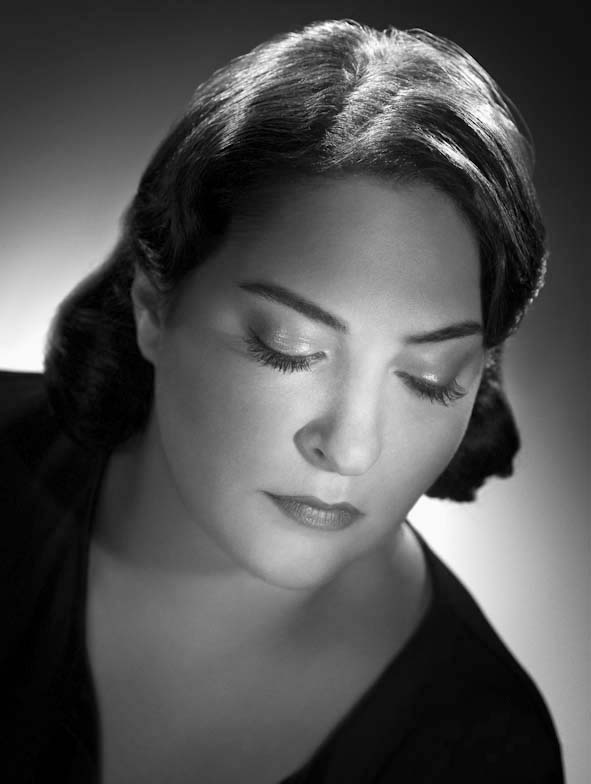
Berry photographed by Studio Harcourt, Paris.

Year	Title	Notes
2016	Joséphine, Pregnant & Fabulous	
2019	Quand on crie au loup	
2022	Je te promets	TV series (12 episodes)

=== Dubbing ===
Year	Title	Role
2015	Inside Out	Sadness
2024	Inside Out 2	Sadness

== Theatre ==
Year	Title	Author	Director	Notes
2002	Nuit d'ivresse	Josiane Balasko	Josiane Balasko	
2004	The Vagina Monologues	Eve Ensler	Tilly	
2005–06	Toc toc	Laurent Baffie	Laurent Baffie	Molière Award for Best Female Newcomer
2009	Tout le monde aime Juliette	Josiane Balasko	Josiane Balasko	
2011	Love, Loss, and What I Wore	Nora & Delia Ephron	Danièle Thompson	

== Decorations ==
- Chevalier of the Order of Arts and Letters (2016)
