= Joséphine, Pregnant & Fabulous =

Joséphine s'arrondit
- Theatrical release poster
- Directed by: Marilou Berry
- Written by: Marilou Berry; Samantha Mazeras
- Produced by: Romain Rojtman
- Starring: Marilou Berry
- Cinematography: Pierric Gantelmi d'Ille
- Edited by: Thibaut Damade
- Music by: Matthieu Gonet
- Production company: Les Films du 24
- Distributed by: UGC Distribution
- Release date: 10 February 2016
- Running time: 90 minutes
- Country: France
- Language: French
- Budget: $11.6 million
- Box office: $5.8 million

Joséphine s'arrondit (literally, Joséphine gets rounder) is a 2016 French romantic comedy film directed by Marilou Berry. It is the sequel to the 2013 film Joséphine.

== Plot ==
Joséphine begins a relationship with a non-smoking man who cooks and likes cats. After discovering that she is pregnant, she faces new responsibilities and challenges involving her sister, who has been living with her for two years and is experiencing depression, as well as finding employment, maintaining her relationship, and navigating her friendships.

== Cast ==
- Marilou Berry as Joséphine
- Mehdi Nebbou as Gilles
- Sarah Suco as Sophie
- Cyril Guei as Cyril
- Medi Sadoun as Marc
- Bérengère Krief as Chloé
- Josiane Balasko as Joséphine's mother
- Patrick Braoudé as Joséphine's father
- Vanessa Guide as Diane
- Victoria Abril as Gilles's mother
- Caroline Anglade as Alexandra
- Catherine Jacob as Anne
- Zahia Dehar as Lola
- Lise Lamétrie as The crèche manager

== Production ==
The film was shot in June and July 2015. It was first shown on 15 January 2016 at the "Festival International du Film de l'Alpe d'Huez" ("International Festival of film of l'Alpe d'Huez") before the general release in France on 10 February 2016.

The film is the debut of Marilou Berry as a director. Berry's real-life mother Josiane Balasko played her mother in the film.
