= Bécassine (2018 film) =

- Directed by: Bruno Podalydès
- Written by: Bruno Podalydès
- Produced by: Pascal Caucheteux
- Starring: Emeline Bayart; Karin Viard; Denis Podalydès; Bruno Podalydès; Josiane Balasko; Michel Vuillermoz
- Cinematography: Patrick Blossier
- Edited by: Christel Dewynter
- Production companies: Why Not Productions; Chabraque Productions; France 3 Cinéma
- Distributed by: UGC
- Release date: 20 June 2018 (France)
- Running time: 102 min
- Country: France
- Language: French
- Budget: $4.8 million
- Box office: $1.7 million

Bécassine is a 2018 French comedy film directed by Bruno Podalydès. It is an adaptation of the French comic strip Bécassine.

== Cast ==
- Emeline Bayart as Bécassine
- Karin Viard as Marquise de Grand-Air
- Denis Podalydès as M. Proey-Minans
- Bruno Podalydès as Rastaquoueros
- Josiane Balasko as Mademoiselle Châtaigne
- Michel Vuillermoz as Uncle Corentin
- Maya Compagnie as Loulotte
- Jean-Noël Brouté as Hilarion
- Philippe Uchan as Cyprien
- Isabelle Candelier as Madeleine
- Vimala Pons as Marie Quillouch
- Claude Perron as Mademoiselle Bongenre

== Production ==
Principal photography on the film began on mid-August 2017 in Perche-en-Nocé and lasted for 12 weeks.

== See also ==
- Bécassine (1940)
