= Why Not Productions =

French film production company

- Type: Public, SA
- Industry: Motion picture film production
- Headquarters: Paris, France

Why Not Productions is a private French film production company founded by producers Pascal Caucheteux and Grégoire Sorlat in 1990. Its main focus is French auteur cinema, but it also co-produces films from other countries. Some of the filmmakers associated with the company are Arnaud Desplechin, Jacques Audiard, Xavier Beauvois and Ken Loach. As of 2011, the films had an average budget of five to six million euros.

== Selected filmography ==
- In the Soup (1992), directed by Alexandre Rockwell
- The Sentinel (La sentinelle) (1992), directed by Arnaud Desplechin
- The Birth of Love (La naissance de l'amour) (1993), directed by Philippe Garrel
- Don't Forget You're Going to Die (N'oublie pas que tu vas mourir) (1995), directed by Xavier Beauvois
- My Sex Life... or How I Got into an Argument (Comment je me suis disputé... (ma vie sexuelle)) (1996), directed by Arnaud Desplechin
- Louis & Frank (1998), directed by Alexandre Rockwell
- Wild Innocence (Sauvage innocence) (2001), directed by Philippe Garrel
- The Perfume of the Lady in Black (2005), directed by Bruno Podalydès
- Assault on Precinct 13 (2005), directed by Jean-François Richet
- The Beat That My Heart Skipped (De battre mon coeur s'est arrêté) (2005), directed by Jacques Audiard
- Kings and Queen (Rois et reine) (2005), directed by Arnaud Desplechin
- The Young Lieutenant (Le petit lieutenant) (2005), directed by Xavier Beauvois
- A Christmas Tale (Un conte de Noël), directed by Arnaud Desplechin
- Looking for Eric (2009), directed by Ken Loach
- A Prophet (Un prophète) (2009), directed by Jacques Audiard
- Tales from the Golden Age (Amintiri din epoca de aur) (2009), directed by Hanno Höfer, Cristian Mungiu, Constantin Popescu, Ioana Uricaru, and Răzvan Marculescu
- White Material (2009), directed by Claire Denis
- Of Gods and Men (Des hommes et des dieux) (2010), directed by Xavier Beauvois
- Beloved (Les bien-aimés) (2011), directed by Christophe Honoré
- The Angels' Share (2012), directed by Ken Loach
- Beyond the Hills (După dealuri) (2012), directed by Cristian Mungiu
- Rust and Bone (De rouille et d'os) (2012), directed by Jacques Audiard
- The Purge (2013), directed by James DeMonaco
- Jimmy's Hall (2014), directed by Ken Loach
- The Purge: Anarchy (2014), directed by James DeMonaco
- The Price of Fame (La rançon de la gloire) (2014), directed by Xavier Beauvois
- The Sweet Escape (2015), directed by Bruno Podalydés
- Dheepan (2015), directed by Jacques Audiard
- My Golden Days (Trois souvenirs de ma jeunesse) (2015), directed by Arnaud Desplechin
- I, Daniel Blake (2016), directed by Ken Loach
- The Red Turtle (2016), directed by Michaël Dudok de Wit
- Jackie (2016), directed by Pablo Larraín
- Bécassine (2018), directed by Bruno Podalydès
- The Sisters Brothers (2018), directed by Jacques Audiard
- A Faithful Man (2018), directed by Louis Garrel
- DNA (2020), directed by Maïwenn
- Deception (2021), directed by Arnaud Desplechin
- The Crusade (2021), directed by Louis Garrel
- Brother and Sister (2022), directed by Arnaud Desplechin
- Jeanne du Barry (2023), directed by Maïwenn
- Emilia Pérez (2024), directed by Jacques Audiard
- The Decline of Fucking Western Civilization (TBA), directed by Gregg Araki
