= Philippe Pollet-Villard =

French filmmaker (born 1960)

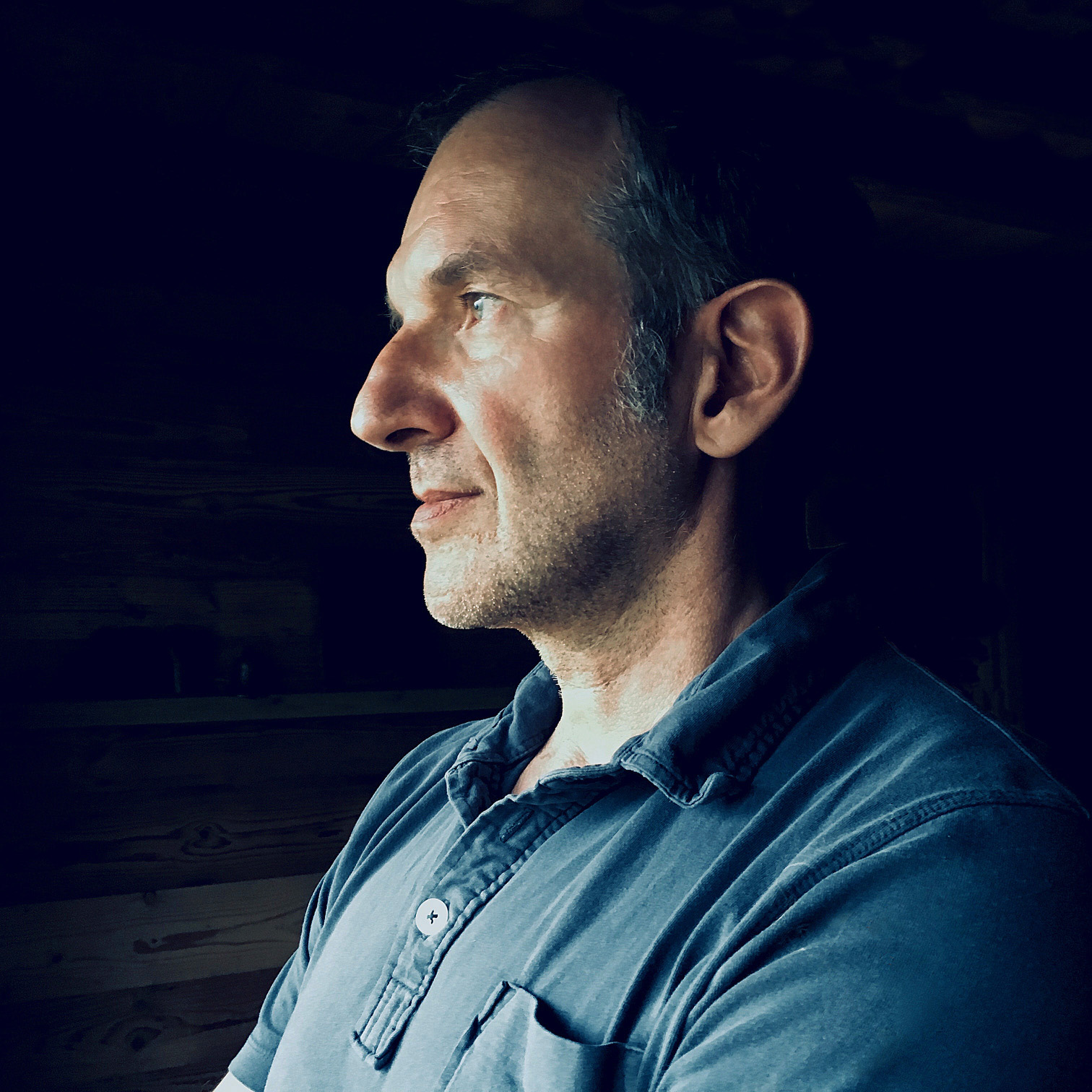
Philippe Pollet-Villard

Philippe Pollet-Villard (born October 30, 1960) is a French filmmaker. He won the Academy Award for Best Live Action Short Film in 2007 for his film Le Mozart des pickpockets. For the film, he also won the César Award for Best Short Film. He is a native of Annecy, France.

== Filmography ==
- 2013 : Joséphine
- 2018 : Naked Normandy
