= Mark Crick =

British photographer and author

Mark Crick is a British photographer and author, best known for his literary parodies Kafka's Soup and Sartre's Sink, in which he presents recipes and DIY tips in the style of famous literary writers. Mark Crick is married to Fiona Simmons Crick.

Crick grew up in Basildon. As a child he suffered from chronic asthma which made both eating and sleeping difficult, to which he attributes his love of both reading and cookery.

Crick studied literature at Warwick University and the University of London.

Paul Auster has asked Mark Crick to write a pastiche of Auster's work. Crick says that he felt honoured to be asked but has not yet succeeded.

== Books ==
- Kafka's Soup
- Sartre's Sink
- Machiavelli's Lawn
