= La Petite Reine =

- Industry: Production
- Founded: 1995
- Founder: Thomas Langmann
- Headquarters: France

La Petite Reine is a French film production company founded in 1995, led by Thomas Langmann and Emmanuel Montamat. The word Reine in the name is a play on words referring to Langmann's father Claude Berri's production company Renn Productions. (Note: Reine and Renn have the same pronunciation in French. La Petite Reine means "the little queen". Berri's company was named after his friend, German actress Katharina Renn.)

== Filmography ==
List of films produced or coproduced by La Petite Reine:

- 1996 : Le Dernier Chaperon rouge
- 2002 : Asterix & Obelix: Mission Cleopatra, Le Boulet
- 2004 : Blueberry, l'expérience secrète, Double Zéro
- 2005 : Foon
- 2006 : Those Happy Days
- 2007 : Steak
- 2008 : Astérix at the Olympic Games (film), Mesrine: Killer Instinct, Mesrine: Public Enemy Number One
- 2010 : Le Mac
- 2011 : La Nouvelle Guerre des boutons, The Artist
- 2012 : The Suicide Shop, Maniac, Stars 80
- 2014 : The Search, Les Francis, Colt 45
- 2016 : À Fond
- 2019 : Quand on crie au loup

== Logo ==
The logo represents a girl wearing a crown and a dress with royal fleur-de-lis motifs on it playing with a skipping rope on the surface of a lake at night.
