= Lorraine Lévy =

French film actress, director and screenwriter

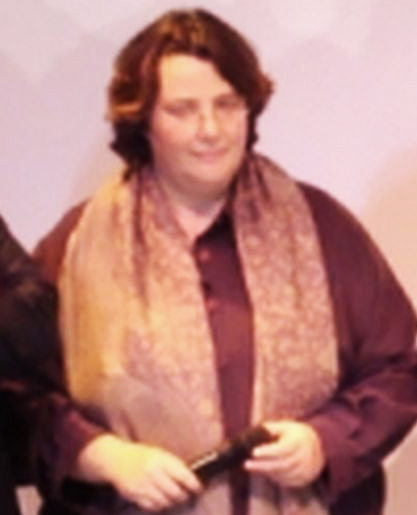
- Lorraine Lévy in 2008
- Born: 29 January 1964 (age 61); Boulogne-Billancourt, France
- Occupation(s): Screenwriter, film director, playwright, stage director
- Years active: 1987–present

Lorraine Lévy (born 29 January 1964) is a French screenwriter, film and stage director, and playwright. She is the sister of writer Marc Levy.

== Life and career ==
After studying literature and law, Lévy became a screenwriter for Jean-Loup Dabadie and René Cleitman while also working as an editor for a publishing house that specializes in art. In 1985, she founded the stage company Compagnie de l'Entracte which staged her first play Finie la comédie (1987). Mostly a screenwriter, she has written screenplays for many telefilms and several episodes of the series Joséphine, ange gardien. In 2004, she made her feature film directorial debut with the comedy film The First Time I Turned Twenty.

== Filmography ==
Year	Title	Credited as		Notes
Year	Title	Director	Screenwriter	Notes
1998–2002	Joséphine, ange gardien		Yes	TV series
2002	Les Frangines		Yes	Telefilm
2003	Père et Maire		Yes	TV series
2003	L'Emmerdeuse		Yes	Telefilm; episode "Les Caprices de l'amour"
2003	Maquette !	Yes		Short film
2003	Lagardère		Yes	Telefilm
2004	The First Time I Turned Twenty	Yes	Yes	
2005	Ma meilleure amie		Yes	Telefilm
2006	L'Homme de ta vie		Yes	Telefilm
2007	Dix films pour en parler	Yes		Short film
2007	L'Affaire Sacha Guitry		Yes	Telefilm
2008	Mes amis, mes amours	Yes	Yes	
2008	De sang et d'encre		Yes	Telefilm
2009	Cartouche, le brigand magnifique		Yes	Telefilm
2010	Un divorce de chien	Yes	Yes	Telefilm
2012	The Other Son	Yes	Yes	Tokyo International Film Festival - Grand Prix; Tokyo International Film Festival - Best Director
2015	Les Yeux ouverts	Yes	Yes	Telefilm
2016	Marion, 13 ans pour toujours		Yes	Telefilm
2017	Knock	Yes	Yes	

== Theatre ==
Year	Title	Notes
1987	Finie la comédie	
1990	Le Partage	
1991	Zelda ou Le Masque	Prix Beaumarchais
1993	La Vie extraordinaire de Léonie Coudray	
1993	Noces de cuir	
