= Bruno Podalydès =

French writer, film director, producer and actor

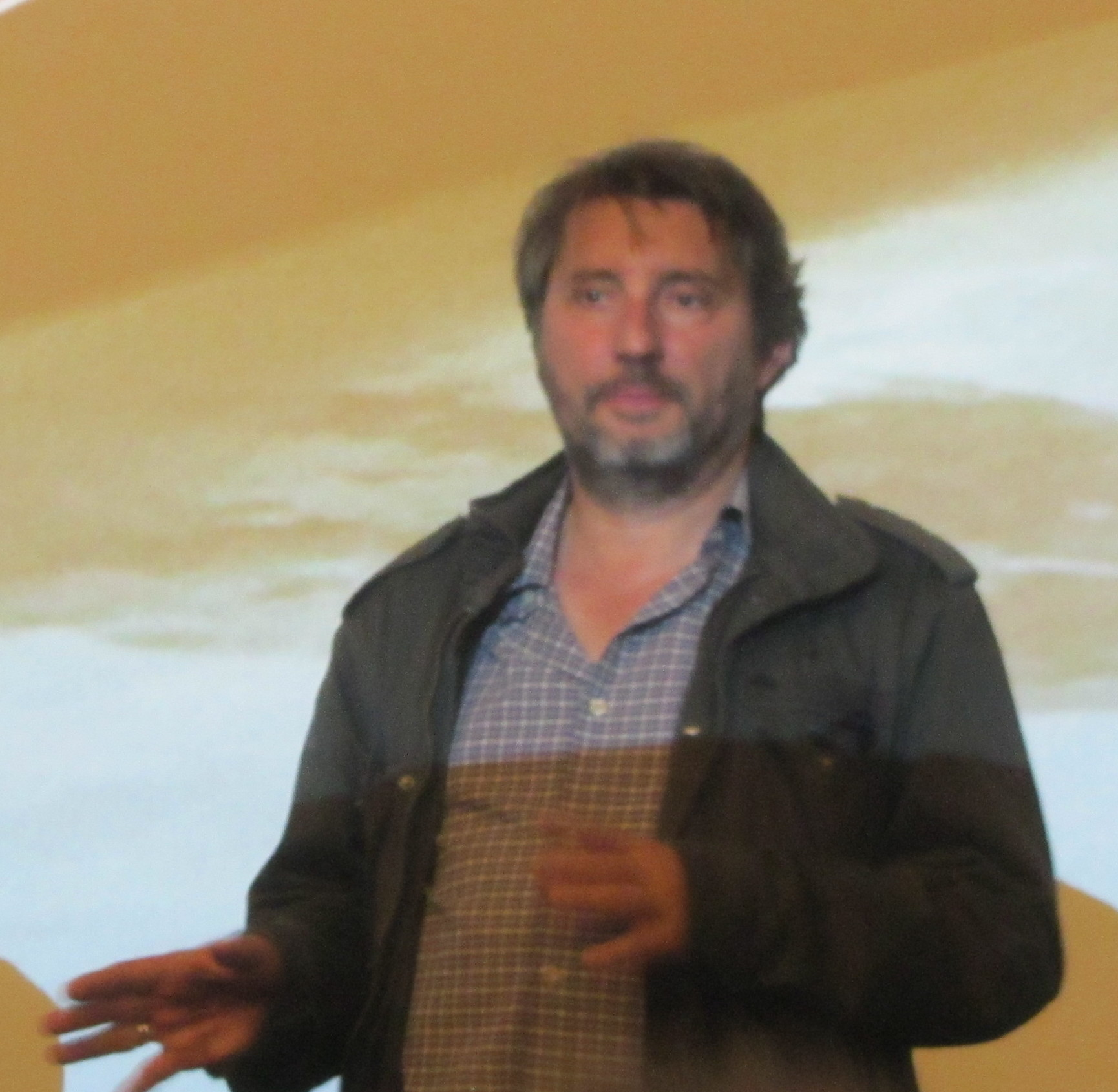
- Podalydès in 2015
- Born: 11 March 1961 (age 65); Versailles, France
- Occupations: Actor, Film director, Screenwriter, Producer
- Years active: 2001–present
- Relatives: Denis Podalydès (brother)

Bruno Podalydès (born 11 March 1961) is a French writer, film director, producer and actor. His brother Denis Podalydès is also an actor.

== Selected filmography ==
Year	Film	Director	Actor	Writer	Notes
2018	Bécassine	Yes	Yes	Yes	
2017	Let the Sunshine In		Yes		
2015	I'm All Yours		Yes		
2015	La Belle Saison		Yes		
2015	The Sweet Escape	Yes	Yes	Yes	
2013	100% cachemire		Yes		
2013	Joséphine		Yes		
2013	The Rendez-Vous of Déjà-Vu		Yes		
2012	The Other Son		Yes		
2012	The Day of the Crows		Yes		
2012	Granny's Funeral	Yes	Yes		Nominated - César Award for Best Original Screenplay
2009	Park Benches	Yes	Yes	Yes	
2006	Paris, je t'aime	Yes	Yes	Yes	
2003	The Mystery of the Yellow Room	Yes	Yes	Yes	
1998	Dieu seul me voit	Yes	Yes	Yes	Winner - César Award for Best Debut
1992	Versailles Rive-Gauche	Yes	Yes	Yes	Winner - César Award for Best Short Film
