= 32nd César Awards =

2007 French film awards ceremony

- Date: 24 February 2007
- Site: Théâtre du Châtelet, Paris, France
- Hosted by: Valérie Lemercier

Highlights
- Best Film: Lady Chatterley
- Best Actor: François Cluzet
- Best Actress: Marina Hands

Television coverage
- Network: Canal+

The 32nd César Awards ceremony, presented by the Académie des Arts et Techniques du Cinéma, honoured the best films of 2006 in France and took place on 24 February 2007 at the Théâtre du Châtelet in Paris. The ceremony was chaired by Claude Brasseur and hosted by Valérie Lemercier. Lady Chatterley won the award for Best Film.

== Winners and nominees ==
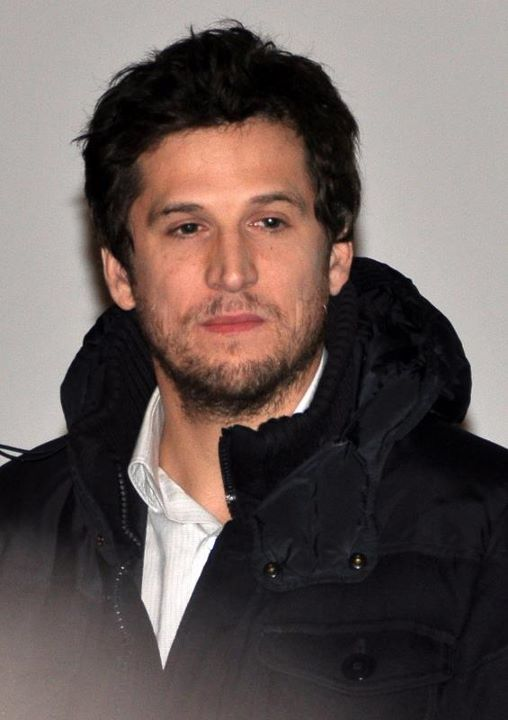
Guillaume Canet, Best Director winner

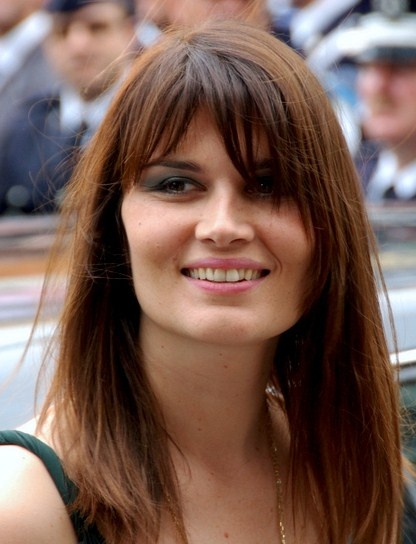
Marina Hands, Best Actress winner

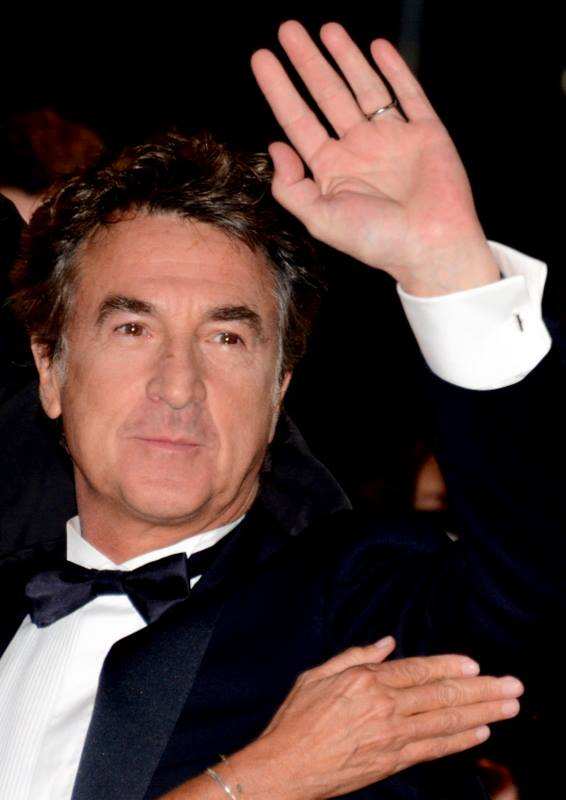
François Cluzet, Best Actor winner

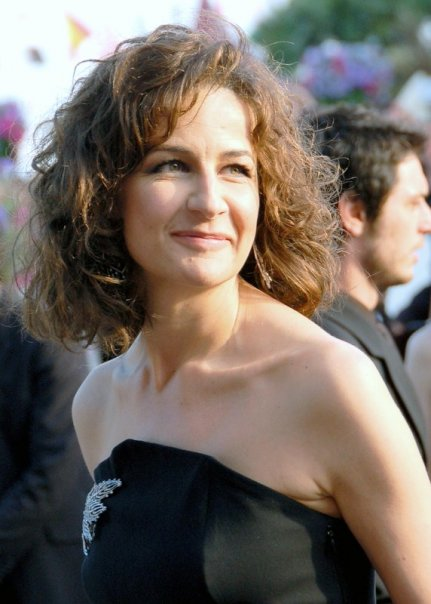
Valérie Lemercier, Best Supporting Actress winner

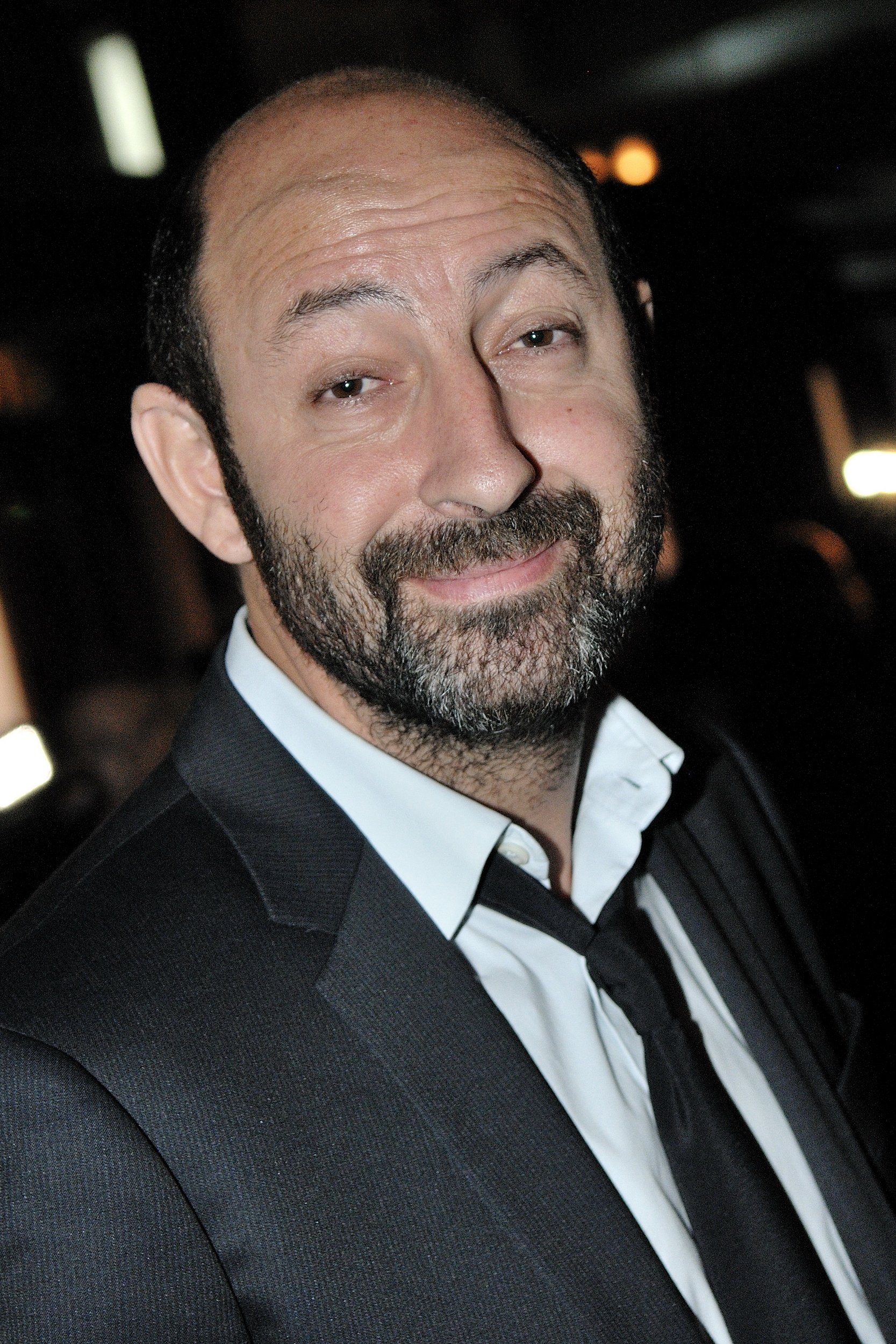
Kad Merad, Best Supporting Actor winner

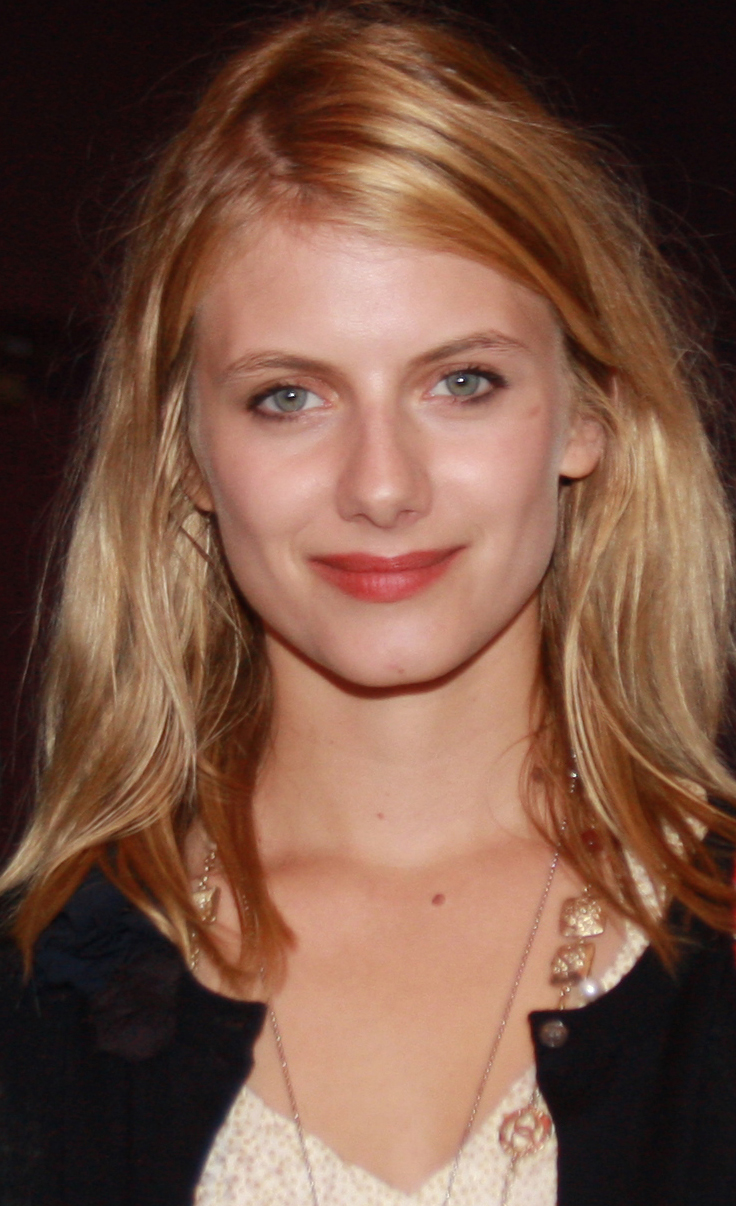
Mélanie Laurent, Most Promising Actress winner

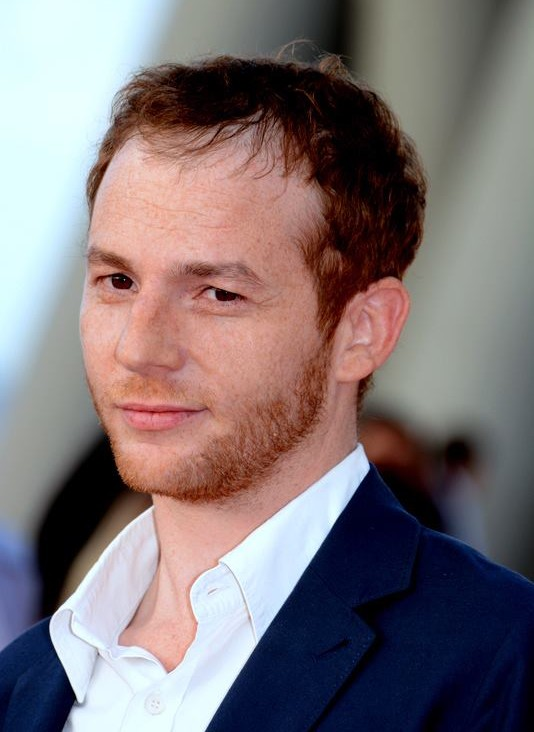
Malik Zidi, Most Promising Actor winner

Best Film (presented by Nathalie Baye) Lady Chatterley: Days of Glory; Don't Worry, I'm Fine; Tell No One; When I Was a Singer	Best Director (presented by Jeanne Moreau) Guillaume Canet – Tell No One: Rachid Bouchareb – Days of Glory; Pascale Ferran – Lady Chatterley; Philippe Lioret – Don't Worry, I'm Fine; Alain Resnais – Private Fears in Public Places
Best Actor (presented by Sabine Azéma) François Cluzet – Tell No One: Michel Blanc – Je vous trouve très beau; Alain Chabat – I Do; Gérard Depardieu – When I Was a Singer; Jean Dujardin – OSS 117: Cairo, Nest of Spies	Best Actress (presented by Pedro Almodóvar) Marina Hands – Lady Chatterley: Cécile de France – Avenue Montaigne; Cécile de France – When I Was a Singer; Catherine Frot – The Page Turner; Charlotte Gainsbourg – I Do
Best Supporting Actor (presented by Marie-France Pisier) Kad Merad – Don't Worry, I'm Fine: Dany Boon – The Valet; François Cluzet – Quatre étoiles; André Dussollier – Tell No One; Guy Marchand – Dans Paris	Best Supporting Actress (presented by Gérard Darmon) Valérie Lemercier – Avenue Montaigne: Dani – Avenue Montaigne; Bernadette Lafont – I Do; Mylène Demongeot – French California; Christine Citti – When I Was a Singer
Most Promising Actor (presented by Lou Doillon) Malik Zidi – Poison Friends: Georges Babluani – 13 Tzameti; Vincent Rottiers – The Passenger; Arié Elmaleh – L'École pour tous; James Thiérrée – Twice Upon a Time; Rasha Bukvic – French California	Most Promising Actress (presented by Vincent Lindon) Mélanie Laurent – Don't Worry, I'm Fine: Déborah François – The Page Turner; Marina Hands – Lady Chatterley; Aïssa Maïga – Bamako; Maïwenn – Pardonnez-moi
Best Original Screenplay (presented by Linh Dan Pham and Hippolyte Girardot) Days of Glory – Olivier Lorelle and Rachid Bouchareb: Jean-Philippe – Laurent Tuel and Christophe Turpin; Avenue Montaigne – Danièle Thompson and Christopher Thompson; When I Was a Singer – Xavier Giannoli; Je vous trouve très beau – Isabelle Mergault	Best Adaptation (presented by Géraldine Pailhas and Gilles Lellouche) Lady Chatterley – Pascale Ferran, Roger Bohbot and Pierre Trividic: Don't Worry, I'm Fine – Philippe Lioret and Olivier Adam; OSS 117: Cairo, Nest of Spies – Jean-François Halin and Michel Hazanavicius; Private Fears in Public Places – Jean-Michel Ribes; Tell No One – Guillaume Canet and Philippe Lefèbvre
Best First Feature Film (presented by Dany Boon) Je vous trouve très beau: 13 Tzameti; Bad Faith; Pardonnez-moi; Fragments of Antonin	Best Cinematography (presented by Marina Foïs) Julien Hirsch – Lady Chatterley: Patrick Blossier – Days of Glory; Éric Gautier – Private Fears in Public Places; Christophe Offenstein – Tell No One; Guillaume Schiffman – OSS 117: Cairo, Nest of Spies
Best Editing (presented by Marina Foïs) Hervé de Luze – Tell No One: Yannick Kergoat – Days of Glory; Sylvie Landra – Avenue Montaigne; Hervé de Luze – Private Fears in Public Places; Martine Giordano – When I Was a Singer	Best Sound (presented by Catherine Jacob) Gabriel Hafner and François Musy – When I Was a Singer: Thomas Gauder, Olivier Hespel, Franck Rubio and Olivier Walczak – Days of Glory; Jean-Jacques Ferran, Jean-Pierre Laforce and Nicolas Moreau – Lady Chatterley; Jean-Marie Blondel, Thomas Desjonquères and Gérard Lamps – Private Fears in Public Places; Pierre Gamand, Jean Goudier and Gérard Lamps – Tell No One
Best Original Music (presented by Rossy de Palma) Matthieu Chedid – Tell No One: Gabriel Yared – Azur & Asmar: The Princes' Quest; Armand Amar – Days of Glory; Jérôme Lemonnier – The Page Turner; Mark Snow – Private Fears in Public Places	Best Costume Design (presented by Bérénice Bejo) Marie-Claude Altot – Lady Chatterley: Jackie Budin – Private Fears in Public Places; Charlotte David – OSS 117: Cairo, Nest of Spies; Pierre-Jean Larroque – The Tiger Brigades; Michèle Richer – Days of Glory
Best Production Design (presented by Catherine Jacob) Maamar Ech-Cheikh – OSS 117: Cairo, Nest of Spies: Dominique Dourand – Days of Glory; François-Renaud Labarthe – Lady Chatterley; Jacques Saulnier – Private Fears in Public Places; Jean-Luc Raoul – The Tiger Brigades	Best Short Film (presented by Zoé Félix) Fais de beaux rêves: Bonbon au poivre; The Guitar Lesson; Le Mammouth Pobalski; Les Volets
Best Documentary Film (presented by Yann Arthus-Bertrand) Dans la peau de Jacques Chirac: La Fille du juge; Ici Najac, à vous la terre; Down There; Zidane: A 21st Century Portrait	Best Foreign Film (presented by Hilary Swank) Little Miss Sunshine: Babel; Brokeback Mountain; Volver; The Queen
Honorary César (presented by Claude Brasseur) Marlène Jobert; Jude Law

== Viewers ==
The show was followed by 2.3 millions of viewers. This corresponds to 12% of the audience.

== See also ==
- 79th Academy Awards
- 60th British Academy Film Awards
- 19th European Film Awards
- 12th Lumière Awards
