= Arthur Dupont =

French actor (born 1985)

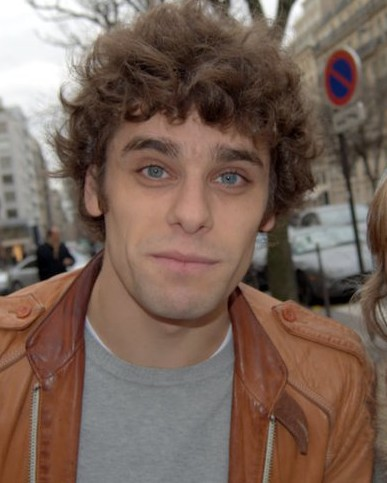
- Dupont at the "Dinner of the nominated" for the 36th César Awards
- Born: 26 July 1985 (age 41); Saint-Mandé, France
- Occupation: Actor
- Years active: 2001–present

Arthur Dupont (French: [aʁtyʁ dypɔ̃]; born 1985) is a French actor. He was born in Saint-Mandé, Val-de-Marne, France.

== Career ==
In 2006, he starred in Chacun sa nuit (One to another) directed by Jean Marc Barr, alongside Lizzie Brocheré and Karl E. Landler.

In 2010, he received a nomination for the César Award for Most Promising Actor for his work on Bus Palladium.

Since 2021, he plays a lead role in the TV series Les Petits Meurtres d'Agatha Christie.

== Personal life ==
He has a son, born in 2021.

== Theatre ==
Year	Title	Author	Director
2002	Conversations with My Father	Herb Gardner	Marcel Bluwal
2007	Shopping and Fucking	Mark Ravenhill	Bénédicte Budan & Franck Victor

== Filmography ==
Year	Title	Role	Director	Notes
2001	Julie Lescaut	Boyfriend	Klaus Biedermann	TV series (1 episode)
2002	Un homme en colère	Romain	Didier Albert	TV series (1 episode)
2003	Sami	Jérôme Martel	Patrice Martineau	TV series (1 episode)
2004	Arsène Lupin	Newspaper seller	Jean-Paul Salomé	
2004	Rue des sans-papiers		Alain Carville	
2004	L'un contre l'autre	Mikaël	Dominique Baron	TV movie
2004	P.J.	Didier	Gérard Vergez	TV series (1 episode)
2004	Père et maire	Fabien Clouzot	Gilles Béhat	TV series (1 episode)
2004	Une fille d'enfer	Semlin / Quentin	Eric Figon & Pascal Lahmani	TV series (2 episodes)
2005	Brasier	Axel	Arnaud Sélignac	TV movie
2005	Le triporteur de Belleville	Man in the couple	Stéphane Kurc	TV movie
2005	Le juge	Brother Steiner	Vincenzo Marano	TV mini-series
2006	Chacun sa nuit	Pierre	Pascal Arnold & Jean-Marc Barr	
2006	Le tuteur	Cédric	François Velle	TV series (1 episode)
2006	R.I.S, police scientifique	Yannick Castro	Laurence Katrian	TV series (1 episode)
2006	Josephine, Guardian Angel	Maxime	Laurent Levy	TV series (1 episode)
2007	Romance of Astree and Celadon	Semyre	Éric Rohmer	
2007	Bac + 70	Julien	Laurent Levy	TV movie
2007	Rock'n Roll Circus	Jérémie	Alain Robillard	TV movie
2007	Sœur Thérèse.com	Dimitri Blondel	Vincenzo Marano	TV series (1 episode)
2007	Le juge est une femme	Sébastien Beland	René Manzor	TV series (1 episode)
2008	Nos 18 ans	Maxime	Frédéric Berthe	
2008	Flirts	Nico	Lionel Dos Santos	Short
2008	Louis la brocante	Sylvain	Bruno Gantillon	TV series (1 episode)
2009	R.T.T.	Didier	Frédéric Berthe	
2009	Réfractaire	Théo	Nicolas Steil	
2009	Many Kisses Later	Jacques	Fausto Brizzi	
2009	Vendetta	Olivier	Patrick Bossard	Short
2009	Le bourgeois gentilhomme	Cléonte	Christian de Chalonge	TV movie
2010	Bus Palladium	Manu Pedraza	Christopher Thompson	Nominated - César Award for Most Promising Actor
2010	Dans ton sommeil	Arthur	Caroline & Éric du Potet	
2012	Bad Girl	Pablo	Patrick Mille	
2012	Mobile Home	Simon	François Pirot	
2012	Haute Cuisine	Nicolas Bauvois	Christian Vincent	
2013	Macadam Baby	Jérémy	Patrick Bossard	
2013	Under the Rainbow	Sandro	Agnès Jaoui	
2014	Yellowbird	Gus	Christian De Vita	
2014	Belgian Rhapsody	Hugues	Vincent Bal	
2014	Maintenant ou jamais	Charles Lesage	Serge Frydman	
2014	L'assistant	Hugo Guibaldi	Thomas Guibal & David Rinaldi	Short
2015	Tom	Paolo	Andrea Cohen	Short
2015	Stunned	Eddy	Gérard Pautonnier	Short
2015	Un obus partout	Voice	Zaven Najjar	Short
2016	Team Spirit	Jérôme Kerviel	Christophe Barratier	
2016	Ma famille t'adore déjà	Julien	Jérôme Commandeur & Alan Corno	
2017	Grand froid	Eddy	Gérard Pautonnier	
2018	Naked Normandy	Vincent Jousselin	Philippe Le Guay	
2019	Victor et Célia	Victor	Pierre Jolivet	
2019	The Bears' Famous Invasion of Sicily	Tonio	Lorenzo Mattotti	
2019	Osmosis	Martin	Pierre Aknine	TV series (1 episode)
2021-22	Les Petits Meurtres d'Agatha Christie	Maxime Beretta	Alexandre Coffre, Émilie Deleuze, ...	TV series (8 episodes)
2022	Les secrets de mon père	Michel Kichka	Véra Belmont	
2022	Des gens bien ordinaires	Roméo	Ovidie	TV series (4 episodes)
2023	Les secrets du paquebot	Grégory Descamps	Christophe Lamotte	TV movie
TBA	Fanon	Jacques Azoulay	Jean-Claude Flamand-Barny	Post-Production
TBA	Une amitié dangereuse	Luynes	Alain Tasma	TV mini-series Post-Production
TBA	La vie rêvée des autres	Franck Petit	Didier Le Pêcheur	TV movie Filming
