= Antoine Gouy =

French actor (born 1980)

- Born: 17 April 1980 (age 45); Nantes, France
- Occupation: Actor
- Years active: 2004–present

Antoine Gouy (French pronunciation: [ɑ̃twan ɡwi]; born 17 April 1980) is a French actor, best known to international audiences for playing Benjamin Férel in the Netflix series Lupin (2021–present).

== Biography and career ==
Gouy was born in Nantes and grew up in the nearby seaside town of La Turballe, Loire-Atlantique. He decided to become an actor at a young age.

From 2013 to 2015 he was part of the cast of the sketch comedy series Casting(s), which also featured Pierre Niney, François Civil, Benjamin Lavernhe, and Fanny Sidney. In the comedy-drama series A Very Secret Service, which ran for two seasons from 2015 to 2018, Gouy played the triple roles of Lechiot, Hervé Gomez, and Schmid.

In 2021 Gouy debuted as Benjamin Férel, the best friend and accomplice of protagonist Assane Diop (Omar Sy), in the Netflix crime thriller series Lupin. The series became an international success on the platform, and at the time of its initial release was its most-viewed non-English-language programme. In 2025, Gouy appeared in another Netflix series, Shafted.

== Filmography ==
=== Film ===
Year	Title	Role	Director	Notes
2004	La mélodie du bonheur	friend	Antoine Colomb	short film
2007	Deux cages sans oiseaux	Antoine, the brother	Mathieu Amalric	short film
2008	Le Plaisir de Chanter	Thomas	Ilan Duren Cohen	
2009	Schéma directeur	Pierre	Bernard Tanguy	short film
2010	On Tour	software man	Mathieu Amalric	
2013	Grand Départ	Timothée	Nicolas Mercier	
2014	La Crème de la crème	educational director	Kim Chapiron	
2014	Brèves de comptoir	jogger	Jean-Michel Ribes	
2015	The Clearstream Affair	Florian Bourges	Vincent Garenq	
2015	A Love You	Manu	Paul Lefèvre	
2015	Premiers Crus	Nicolas Rousselier	Jérôme Le Maire	
2015	La Magie de Noël	Sylvain, the brother-in-law	Mathieu Amalric	short film
2016	Gaz de France	Chris	Benoît Forgeard	
2016	A Decent Man	trainer	Emmanuel Finkiel	
2016	Rupture pour tous	Alan	Éric Capitaine	
2016	Les Enfants de la chance	Charles	Malik Chibane	
2016	Two Is a Family	steward	Hugo Gélin	
2017	Primaire	Bruno	Hélène Angel	
2017	If I Were a Boy	Anton	Audrey Dana	
2017	Mr. & Mrs. Adelman	Antoine Grillot	Nicolas Bedos	
2017	Bienvenue au Gondwana	Julien Franchon	Mamane	
2018	Demi-sœurs	Thomas	Saphia Azzeddine, François-Régis Jeanne	
2018	Budapest	Tristan	Xavier Gens	
2019	All About Yves	Yves	Benoît Forgeard	voice role
2019	Merveilles à Montfermeil	le grand bourgeois	Jeanne Balibar	
2019	Camille	the brother of Camille Lepage	Boris Lojkine	
2020	C'est la vie	Jean-Baptiste	Julien Rambaldi	
2020	Comment je suis devenu super-héros	medical examiner	Douglas Attal	
2021	Delicious	Marquis du Croisic	Éric Besnard	
2021	On est fait pour s'entendre	Julien	Pascal Elbé	
2022	The Butcher's Daughter	Yves de la Closerie	Christopher Thompson	
2022	Simone Veil, A Woman of the Century	Jean-Paul Dauvin	Olivier Dahan	
2023	A Great Friend	Monceau	Éric Besnard	
2023	Cash	Patrick Breuil	Jérémie Rozan	
2023	Anti-Squat	Thomas	Nicolas Silhol	
2023	Like a Prince	Pedro	Ali Marhyar	
2025	Délocalisés	Berthelot	Ali Bougheraba, Redouane Bougheraba	
2025	Natacha (presque) hôtesse de l'air	Jacques	Noémie Saglio	

=== Television ===
Year	Title	Role	Notes
2006	Chat bleu, chat noir	Gaspard	two-part TV movie
2008	Addresse Inconnue	Fabrice	
2009	Ce jour-là, tout a changé	Louis XVI	one episode
2011	Rani	Charles de Bussy	miniseries
2011	Une famille formidable	Kevin	two episodes
2012	La main passe	Constantin	TV movie
2012	Bref	the guy nobody knows	four episodes
2013	Crime d'État	the substitute	TV movie
2013	Le Débarquement		one episode
2013–2015	Casting(s)	Antoine	
2013–2015	Lazy Company	Chuck	
2015	Templeton	Miss Daisy, the saloon owner	
2015	Objectivement, la vie quotidienne des objets quotidiens	various roles	miniseries
2015–2017	Hero Corp	Calvin	
2015–2018	A Very Secret Service	Lechiot, Hervé Gomez, Schmidt	
2018	T.A.N.K.		miniseries
2018	Call My Agent!	librarian	one episode
2018–2019	À l'intérieur	Bastien	miniseries
2019	Un entretien	the second HR director	
2021–present	Lupin	Benjamin Férel	Netflix series
2021	J'ai tué mon mari	Manuel	miniseries
2023	Les Enchantés	Monsieur Boniface	TV movie
2024	Fortune de France	Gamelin	
2024	Carpe Diem	Salvatore	
2024	Capitaine Marleau	Romain Paulin	one episode
2025	Shafted	Jérémie	Netflix series
