= Luminal (film) =

2004 film

- Directed by: Andrea Vecchiato
- Starring: Denis Lavant
- Release date: 2004

Luminal is the debut film from Italian director Andrea Vecchiato.

Named after the drug phenobarbitone, the film is based on the cult novel by Italian writer Isabella Santacroce. Santacroce's third novel, published in 2001, tells the story of teenagers caught up in the excesses of chemical culture.

French actor Denis Lavant stars in the film, having previously worked with director Leos Carax. Influenced by French New Wave cinema and Japanese aesthetics, the film has been described as postmodern, unorthodox and unconventional in terms of the filming technology employed.

Luminal co-produced by Leo Pescarolo who has also worked with Lars von Trier, Federico Fellini and Raoul Ruiz.
