= A Very Secret Service =

French comedy-drama series

- Genre: Comedy, drama
- Created by: Jean-François Halin
- Written by: Jean-François Halin; Claire Lemaréchal; Jean-André Yerlès
- Directed by: Alexandre Courtès
- Starring: Hugo Becker; Wilfred Benaïche; Christophe Kourotchkine
- Theme music composer: Nicolas Godin
- Country of origin: France
- Original language: French
- No. of seasons: 2
- No. of episodes: 24

Production
- Producer: Alexandre Courtès
- Running time: 21-31 minutes
- Production company: Mandarin TV

Original release
- Network: Arte
- Release: 29 October 2015 – 19 July 2018

A Very Secret Service (French: Au service de la France, lit. 'In Service of France') is a French comedy-drama series created by Jean-François Halin and produced by Gilles de Verdière.

== Premise ==
In 1960, young André Merlaux eagerly accepts a cryptic summons to take a position as a trainee officer with the French Secret Services (based on the Service de Documentation Extérieure et de Contre-Espionnage). He will be watched over by the operations director Moïse, and reluctantly mentored by senior colleagues Moulinier (in charge of African affairs), Jacquard (Algeria), and Calot (Eastern Bloc). It is the height of the Cold War and the position of France as a Great Power is in crisis, faced with independence challenges from the colonies of French West Africa, above all the fight over the independence of Algeria. French society is changing at home as well, with a rising counterculture exemplified by growing feminism and New Wave cinema.

== Cast and characters ==
=== Main cast ===
- Hugo Becker as André Merlaux
- Wilfred Benaïche as Colonel Maurice Mercaillon
- Christophe Kourotchkine as Georges Préjean "Moïse"
- Mathilde Warnier as Sophie Mercaillon
- Karim Barras as Jacky Jacquard
- Bruno Paviot as Roger Moulinier
- Jean-Édouard Bodziak as Jean-René Calot
- Marie-Julie Baup as Marie-Jo Cotin

=== Secondary characters ===
- Joséphine de La Baume as Miss Clayborn
- Antoine Gouy as Henri Lechiot / Hervé Gomez / Schmid
- Philippe Resimont as Father Jean
- Julie Farenc as Nathalie
- Khalid Maadour as Moktar
- Stéphanie Fatout as Irène Mercaillon
- Axelle Simon as Marthe
- Baptiste Sornin as Planton, reception desk employee

== Development ==
Principal photography for the first series took place between October 2014 and February 2015 in Île-de-France and Morocco.

The series recalls OSS 117: Cairo, Nest of Spies in style and tone, although it is slightly more serious (writer Halin was also credited for the screenplay of all three OSS 117 films, and one of the three Les Guignols authors). The show uses historical events as background or foreground for its action, similar to Mad Men (such as the Algerian war of independence and the first French nuclear test, Gerboise Bleue).

Arte's president of fiction, Olivier Wotling, confirmed a second season to Le Figaro's TV Magazine on July 3, 2016.

In a March 2019 interview with the French language outlet PureMédias, Hugo Becker expressed doubt regarding the likelihood of a third season, stating that the series had reached "the end of the arc," and adding that while "there might be material... the story is complete and I think that's fine." As an aside, however, several characters (including Moulinier, Jacquard, and Calot) as well as the SDECE office sets from the television show are vividly featured in OSS 117: From Africa with Love (2021), indirectly creating a shared universe between the two franchises.

== Episodes ==
=== Season 1 (2015) ===
No.	Title	Directed by	Written by	Original release date
1	"Le Tsèt" "The Tsèt"	Alexandre Courtès	Jean-François Halin, Claire Lemaréchal & Jean-André Yerles	28 October 2015
André Merlaux, 23, is hired as a trainee in the French secret service. Under the watchful eye of Moïse, the director of operations, three elite agents train him to become a spy: Moulinier, in charge of African affairs; Jacquard, who deals with Algeria; and Calot, a specialist in Eastern Europe. Merlaux is surprised to discover the service headed by the intimidating Colonel Mercaillon.
2	"Il y a Allemand et Allemand" "There's German and German"	Alexandre Courtès	Jean-François Halin, Claire Lemaréchal & Jean-André Yerles	28 October 2015
Moulinier and Jacquard succeed in capturing a former Nazi. Unfortunately for them, the time is ripe for Franco-German friendship. Disappointed, they will do everything to keep their "Nazi bonus"... even if it means creating a diplomatic incident. Merlaux, on the other hand, meets the beautiful Sophie.
3	"Un peu de soleil" "A Bit of Sun"	Alexandre Courtès	Jean-François Halin, Claire Lemaréchal & Jean-André Yerles	28 October 2015
Three emissaries from the future African state of Dahomey come to the Service. Their request: independence! Moulinier is charged with bringing them to their senses, but he fails. Moïse entrusts the file to Merlaux. Merlaux takes it up with enthusiasm.
4	"L'Algérie, c'est la France" "Algeria, it's France"	Alexandre Courtès	Jean-François Halin, Claire Lemaréchal & Jean-André Yerles	28 October 2015
The FLN threatens the French authority in Algeria: Jacquard and Merlaux are sent there to solve the problem. As a good student, Merlaux prepares his mission by identifying two potential targets. He soon realises that Jacquard's interests in Algiers are not only patriotic... Listening only to his duty, he focuses on the enemy, and is confronted for the first time with the harsh reality of a spy's work.
5	"Le Prunier" "The Plum Tree"	Alexandre Courtès	Jean-François Halin, Claire Lemaréchal & Jean-André Yerles	5 November 2015
Merlaux is on a mission in Moscow with Calot. In an attempt to show him the ropes, Calot makes a clumsy move and causes an incident with the CIA. In love, Merlaux prefers to go see Breathless with Sophie.
6	"Une Femme moderne" "A Modern Woman"	Alexandre Courtès	Jean-François Halin, Claire Lemaréchal & Jean-André Yerles	5 November 2015
Colonel Mercaillon decides to create a post of deputy director. Moulinier, Jacquard and Calot will (really) try everything to get the job. Merlaux, for his part, is unsettled by Sophie and her desire to be a "modern woman". A term he hardly understands...
7	"VG 42" "VG 42"	Alexandre Courtès	Jean-François Halin, Claire Lemaréchal & Jean-André Yerles	5 November 2015
The agents learn that the VG42, a surcharge inherited from the Vichy regime, is being abolished, calling into question their social benefits. Outraged, Moulinier, Jacquard and Calot go on strike. The colonel forbids Merlaux to see his daughter Sophie.
8	"Mission Monôme" "Mission Monôme"	Alexandre Courtès	Jean-François Halin, Claire Lemaréchal & Jean-André Yerles	5 November 2015
The colonel learns that Merlaux is still seeing Sophie. To dissuade him, he sets a trap with a Lebanese arms dealer. Merlaux ends up in bed with Clayborn and is filmed without his knowledge.
9	"Plume Invisible" "Invisible Plume"	Alexandre Courtès	Jean-François Halin, Claire Lemaréchal & Jean-André Yerles	12 November 2015
Moulinier, Jacquard and Calot prepare a mission of the utmost importance: to go incognito to the United Kingdom to attend the France-Wales rugby match. Unfortunately, Moïse sends them to Algiers to arrest a terrorist. The colonel reveals to Merlaux that he set him up during his "Monôme mission", before realising that he himself is under threat: someone in the Service seems to be digging into his past.
10	"Le Code Taupe" "Code Name Mole"	Alexandre Courtès	Jean-François Halin, Claire Lemaréchal & Jean-André Yerles	12 November 2015
There is a mole in the Service! To flush him out, Moïse is lent a lie detector by Mossad. Merlaux fears that the colonel will find out from this new machine that he is still seeing Sophie. The colonel fears for his reputation: the results of the detector cast doubt on the nature of his activities during the German occupation.
11	"Le Plan Quinquennal" "The Five-Year Plan"	Alexandre Courtès	Jean-François Halin, Claire Lemaréchal & Jean-André Yerles	12 November 2015
The hunt for the mole stimulates Calot's paranoid tendencies. What if the culprit was none other than himself? He informs his colleagues. Meanwhile, the colonel's suspicions are confirmed: Moïse digs into his past as a collaborator. Merlaux welcomes Sophie into his home and tells her the story of an orphan raised by a priest. A priest that the colonel seems to know very well.
12	"Au Service de ma France" "In the Service of My France"	Alexandre Courtès	Jean-François Halin, Claire Lemaréchal & Jean-André Yerles	12 November 2015
The colonel wants to put an end to Merlaux: he sends him to Algiers with instructions to eliminate the mole. A mission that he also entrusts to Moïse... While Calot loses himself in his questions about his identity and Jacquard foments an attack against General de Gaulle to preserve his real estate interests in Algiers, the colonel's ploy succeeds: Moïse returns to France after having eliminated Merlaux, a traitor to the nation. Buried, his file joins the dusty archives of the Service. Unless?

=== Season 2 (2018) ===
No.	Title	Directed by	Written by	Original release date
13	"Tétanos et Fièvre Jaune" "Tetanus and Yellow Fever"	Alexis Charrier	Jean-François Halin, Claire Lemaréchal & Jean-André Yerles	28 June 2018
Calot, Jacquard and Moulinier leave for Cuba on a secret rescue mission: agent Clayborn is held hostage there. She refuses to return with them, being pregnant with a Cuban Revolutionary’s child. The 3 agents are arrested by the Revolutionaries, then saved by a mysterious man wearing a black suit. All the while, the Colonel sets a trap for Moïse.
14	"Autodéterminés" "Self-Driven"	Alexis Charrier	Jean-François Halin, Claire Lemaréchal & Jean-André Yerles	28 June 2018
January the 8th of 1961 is the date of the referendum on Algeria’s status. Jacquard, helped by Moktar, blows up his houses in Algiers, accusing the National Liberation Front, for the insurance money. André tries to free Moïse while Sophie introduces her fiance to her family.
15	"Quand l'eau est à 12 degrés, on doit s'attendre à ce qu'elle soit froide" "When the Water's at 12 Degrees, Expect It to be Cold"	Alexis Charrier	Jean-François Halin, Claire Lemaréchal & Jean-André Yerles	28 June 2018
Quebec’s independentists pay a visit to the agency, begging for assistance. Calot, Jacquard and Moulinier welcome them but they look down on their language, the Quebec French, that they only part understand. The visitors are offended and decide to seek assistance from the National Liberation Front. The Quebec’s independentists call themselves the Front de Libération du Québec. The Colonel orders his henchmen to kill André.
16	"Le singe est dans la fusée" "The Monkey Is in the Rocket"	Alexis Charrier	Jean-François Halin, Claire Lemaréchal & Jean-André Yerles	12 July 2018
André discovers that his parents were communists and fought for the French Resistance during the war. As André is about to kill Mercaillon, the latter tells André: “I am your father”. André decides to look for his mother. In the meanwhile, Calot lays out the new geopolitical context of the Cold War to the service, making everybody laugh at him. Moulinier is sent to Berlin instead of Calot to take part in a meeting gathering the four Berlin’s Occupying Forces. He is overly suspicious because of an intercepted note.
17	"Le Pouche" "The Coup"	Alexis Charrier	Jean-François Halin, Claire Lemaréchal & Jean-André Yerles	12 July 2018
André tries to join the KGB. General de Gaulle asks of Mercaillon that he negotiated Algeria’s independence. However, his wife Irène left him all alone and he is totally depressed. He gives way to every request of the National Liberation Front and totally lets go of French Algeria. Marie-Jo notifies Moïse of the nuclear risk in Algeria concerning the Gerboise Verte weapon and he asks Jacquard, who is in Algeria with Mercaillon, to retrieve it. Mercaillon’s neglect of Algeria strongly disappoints Jacquard. He decides to inspire French Retired Generals in Algeria into a coup. Marie-Jo (finally) becomes an agent.
18	"Elle est pas verte, Gerboise Verte" "The Green Gerbil Isn't So Green"	Alexis Charrier	Jean-François Halin, Claire Lemaréchal & Jean-André Yerles	12 July 2018
Jacquard, Moktar and Mercaillon take Gerboise Verte, the French atomic bomb, on an epic 2CV trip from Algiers to Reggane crossing the desert. Back in France, Moulinier falls in love with Irène, while André undergoes KGB’s tests.
19	"Quel rapport avec l'Afrique ?" "What's Africa Got to Do With It?"	Alexis Charrier	Jean-François Halin, Claire Lemaréchal & Jean-André Yerles	19 July 2018
Moulinier is tasked to select the future president of a newly independent African country and to decide the score of the election. Deeply in love, he picks a poet who moved him, out of the four candidates. The poet is murdered soon after his election.
20	"John, Jacky, Yvonne et le Général" "John, Jacky, Yvonne and the General"	Alexis Charrier	Jean-François Halin, Claire Lemaréchal & Jean-André Yerles	19 July 2018
Two CIA agents visit the agency on a mission to plan the visit of John and Jackie Kennedy in Paris. The Americans are obsessed with communists and claim that a French agent is a KGB mole. Moïse asks Marie-Jo to track André. The colonel follows Moïse and discovers that he is homosexual.
21	"Tovaritch Merlaux" "Tovaritch Merlaux"	Alexis Charrier	Jean-François Halin, Claire Lemaréchal & Jean-André Yerles	19 July 2018
Mercaillon blackmails Moïse: if he doesn’t hand over André, Mercaillon will reveal to the whole Service the fact that Moïse loves men. Jacquard, Moulinier and Calot go to Moscow for a “To the East module” where they discover the local customs. André enters the KGB and accesses its archives in order to learn more about his parents.
22	"C'est beau la Pologne" "Poland Is a Lovely Place"	Alexis Charrier	Jean-François Halin, Claire Lemaréchal & Jean-André Yerles	26 July 2018
Calot, Jacquard and Moulinier arrest André in Moscow Airport. They drive back to Paris. They stop by Berlin for the night and meet twin sisters that Calot knows and seems interested in. They wake up to see a wall erected in the middle of the city. André saves them by showing his KGB agent card, enabling them to leave Berlin. Sophie tells her mother she is in love with Yamine, an Algerian independentist.
23	"Non mort de la taupe morte" "The Non-Death of the Dead Mole"	Alexis Charrier	Jean-François Halin, Claire Lemaréchal & Jean-André Yerles	26 July 2018
Everybody is back in Paris. The colonel wants André to be executed for treachery against the nation. The real KGB mole tries to kill André. Mercaillon releases André to enable his henchmen to put him down.
24	"Code étendu en Algérie" "Code Extended to Algeria"	Alexis Charrier	Jean-François Halin, Claire Lemaréchal & Jean-André Yerles	26 July 2018
Tracking Yannick’s lead, André goes to Algeria. Colonel Mercaillon sends Moulinier, Calot and Jacquard after André. Marie-Jo joins them and they meet the KGB headhunter on a train, dressed as a loukoum seller. They arrive at the monastery where Yannick is supposed to be. Mercaillon is firmly determined to kill André and they all meet up at the monastery.

== Release ==
It was commissioned by Arte, where it premiered in 2015, and was later distributed worldwide by Netflix on 1 July 2016. The second season appeared on Netflix in August 2018. The show was removed from Netflix in November 2022.

== Reception ==
Steve Greene of IndieWire wrote that despite a "certain level of absurdity", the show was a "pretty well-calibrated balance between homage and parody".
