= Vincent Bal =

Belgian film director

Vincent Bal (born 25 February 1971) is a Belgian filmmaker and visual artist widely known for his artwork based around shadows cast by everyday objects. As a writer and director he is best known for Miss Minoes (2001), The Zigzag Kid (2012), Belgian Rhapsody (2014), and The Bloody Olive (1997).

== Early life and education ==
Bal was born on 25 February 1971 in Ghent, Belgium. His mother is Eva Bal, a Dutch theater director, pioneer in the youth theater domain. He studied film directing at the Hogeschool Sint-Lukas Brussel.

== Career ==
=== Film ===
In the third year of his film degree, Bal directed the short film Aan Zee (1993), which was selected for several festivals. He graduated in 1994 with the short film Tour de France (1994) which won several awards, including the Canal+ Award at the Clermont-Ferrand International Short Film Festival and Best Short Film at the Dresden Film Festival. After graduation, he directed The Bloody Olive (1997), a film noir spoof based on a comic book by Lewis Trondheim. In 1999, he directed Man Van Staal (Man of Steel), which won the International Jury Prize at the 2000 Berlin Kinderfilmfest. In 2012 he directed The Zigzag Kid (also titled Nono, the Zigzag Kid), a family adventure film starring Thomas Simon (as the title character) and Isabella Rossellini. The film is based on the novel of the same name by David Grossman.

==== Filmography ====
- Sea Shadow (2020): short, director/writer
- Stranger (2017): documentary featurette, co-director
- Belgian Rhapsody (2014): feature, director/co-writer
- The Zigzag Kid (2012): feature, director/co-screenwriter
- Kika & Bob (2007–2008, 2014): animated TV series, co-Creator/writer/director
- Miss Minoes (2001): feature, director/co-screenwriter
- Man van staal (1999): feature, director/writer
- Joli môme (1997): short, director/co-writer
- The Bloody Olive (1996): short, director/screenwriter
- Tour de France (1994): short, director/writer
- Aan zee (1993): short, director/writer

=== Illustration ===
Bal is known for his shadow art illustrations, made by combining shadows cast from everyday objects with hand-drawn doodles. He began his ongoing "Shadowology" series in 2016 when he challenged himself to make a shadow doodle every day. On where the inspiration for the series came from, Bal says:

"Like all good things in life, it came by accident. I was working on a film script (for a film that is never made) when I noticed how the shadow of my teacup looked a bit like an elephant. I gave the shadow animal eyes and a smile, and took a picture. When I shared it on social media, the reactions were really nice, so I decided to try and make one every day. That was may 2016 and I haven't stopped since."

Bal is currently working on the Shadowology live-action film that incorporates his shadow drawings and also has a published book of his illustrations by the same name.

== Awards ==
Algarve International Film Festival

Year	Nomination Category	Film	Result
1998	Grand Prize of the City of Portimão	The Bloody Olive (1997)	Nominated

Berlin International Film Festival

Year	Nomination Category	Film	Result
2000	Deutsches Kinderhilfswerk Grand Prix	Man van staal (1999) Tied with Tsatsiki, Mum and the Policeman (1999)	Winner

Brussels International Fantastic Film Festival (BIFFF)

Year	Nomination Category	Film	Result
1998	Audience Award for Best Short Film	The Bloody Olive (1997)	Winner
1998	Canal+ Belgique Award	The Bloody Olive (1997)	Winner

Chicago International Children's Film Festival

Year	Nomination Category	Film	Result
2002	Children's Jury Award	Minoes (2001)	Winner

Children KinoFest

Year	Nomination Category	Film	Result
2014	Grand Prize	Non, het Zigzag Kind (2012)	Nominated

Clermont-Ferrand International Short Film Festival

Year	Nomination Category	Film	Result
1997	Grand Prix	The Bloody Olive (1997)	Nominated
1995	Canal+ Award	Tour de France (1995)	Winner

Dresden Film Festival

Year	Nomination Category	Film	Result
1997	Youth Jury Award	The Bloody Olive (1997)	Winner
1995	Best Short Film	Tour de France (1995)	Winner

European Film Awards

Year	Nomination Category	Film	Result
2013	Young Audience Award	Nono, het Zigzag Kind (2012)	Winner

Magritte Awards

Year	Nomination Category	Film	Result
2016	Magritte Award	Brabançonne (2014)	Nominated

Molodist International Film Festival

Year	Nomination Category	Film	Result
1997	Best Film Award	The Bloody Olive (1997)	Nominated

Montréal International Children's Film Festival

Year	Nomination Category	Film	Result
2013	Audience Award	Nono, het Zigzag Kind (2012)	Winner

Oulu International Children's Film Festival

Year	Nomination Category	Film	Result
2013	Starboy Award	Nono, het Zigzag Kind (2012)	Nominated
2002	Starboy Award	Minoes (2001)	Nominated

Tallinn Black Nights Film Festival

Year	Nomination Category	Film	Result
2013	Just Film Award - Special Mention	Nono, het Zigzag Kind (2020)	Winner
2013	Just Film Award	Nono, het Zigzag Kind (2020)	Nominated

Torino International Festival of Young Cinema

Year	Nomination Category	Film	Result
1995	Prize of the City of Torino	Tour de France (1995)	Nominated
