= Passer l'hiver =

- Theatrical release poster
- Directed by: Aurélia Barbet
- Written by: Aurélia Barbet; Christophe Cousin
- Based on: "Nouvel An" by Olivier Adam
- Produced by: Serge Duveau
- Starring: Gabrielle Lazure; Lolita Chammah
- Cinematography: Laurent Desmet
- Edited by: Agathe Dreyfus
- Production company: Abelina Films Production
- Distributed by: Shellac Distribution
- Release dates: 22 January 2013 (Angers); 15 January 2014 (France)
- Running time: 80 minutes
- Country: France
- Language: French
- Budget: €150,000

Passer l'hiver is a 2013 French drama film directed by Aurélia Barbet and starring Gabrielle Lazure and Lolita Chammah. The film is loosely based on a short story by Olivier Adam.

== Cast ==
- Gabrielle Lazure as Claire
- Lolita Chammah as Martine
- Sophie Cattani as The hotel manager
- Cyril Descours as Michel
- Thierry Levaret as Alain
- Joana Preiss as Anita
- Yoan Charles as Luc
- Sabine Londault as Claire's mother
