= Denis Lavant =

French actor (born 1961)

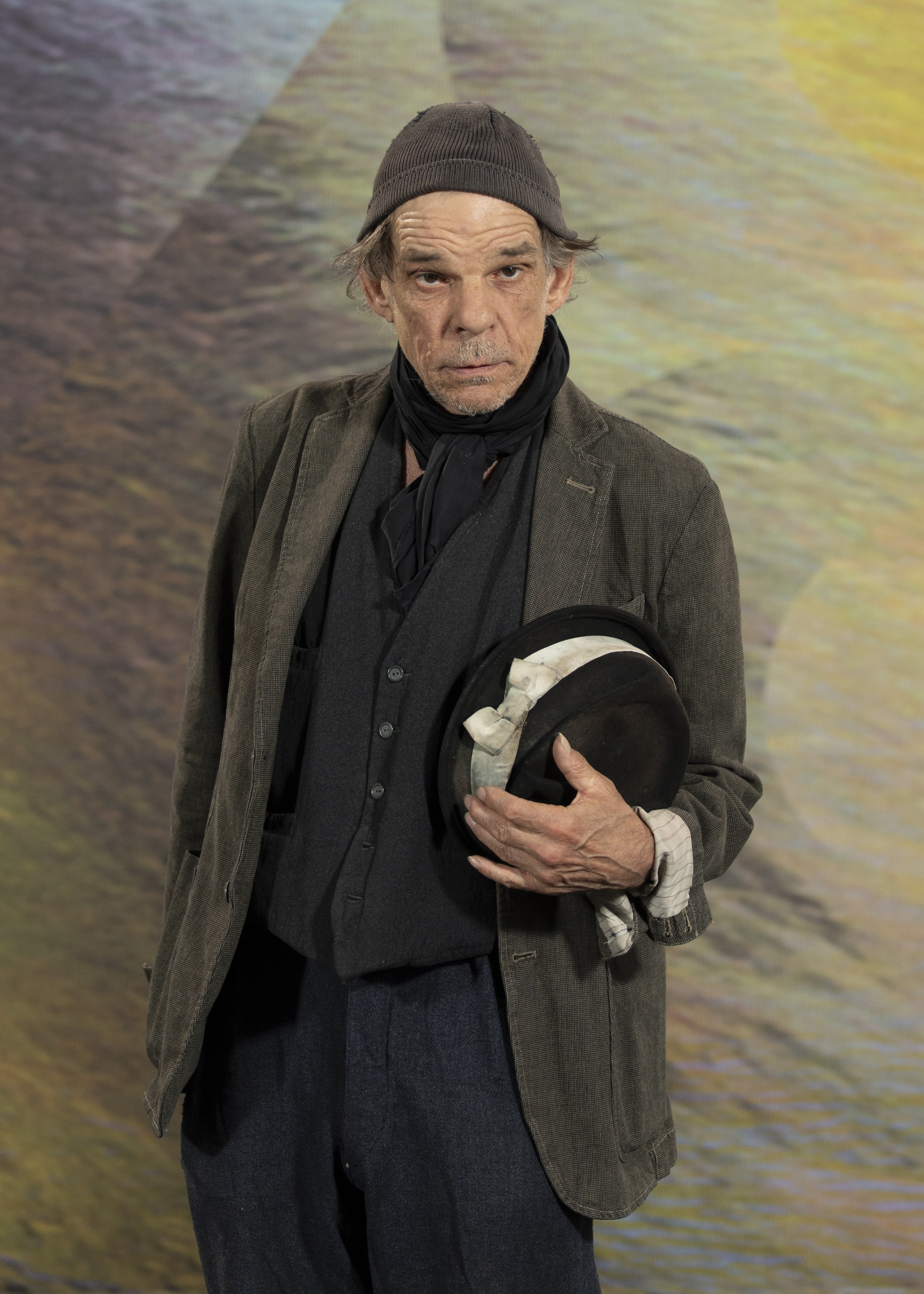
- Lavant at the 78th Locarno Film Festival
- Born: 17 June 1961 (age 65); Neuilly-sur-Seine, Hauts-de-Seine, France
- Occupation: Actor
- Years active: 1982–present

Denis Lavant (born 17 June 1961) is a French actor. He is known for his distinctive face and the physically demanding aspects of the roles he plays, which often involve slapstick, acrobatics, or dance, as well as for his long-standing association with director Leos Carax. Lavant has played the lead role in all but two of Carax's films, including Les amants du Pont-Neuf (1991) and Holy Motors (2012). Lavant is also known for his roles in Claire Denis' Beau Travail (1999) and Harmony Korine's Mister Lonely (2007).

== Life and career ==
Lavant was born in Neuilly-sur-Seine, Hauts-de-Seine, in France. At 13, he took courses in pantomime and the circus, fascinated by Marcel Marceau. He trained at the Paris Conservatoire under Jacques Lassalle, and began his professional career in 1982 in theatre, acting in Shakespeare's Hamlet and The Merchant of Venice. In 1982 he appeared in the television film L'Ombre sur la plage, before playing the minor part of Montparnasse in Robert Hossein's Les Misérables, which was entered into the 13th Moscow International Film Festival where it won a Special Prize. He appeared in several further minor roles before making his breakthrough in 1984 as the lead in Boy Meets Girl, playing a depressed, aspiring filmmaker who falls in love with a suicidal young woman. The film marked the feature-film debut of Leos Carax, with whose work Lavant has been associated ever since.

In 1986, Lavant and Carax worked together again on the thriller Mauvais Sang and again in 1991 on Carax's third film, Les Amants du Pont-Neuf. In both Mauvais Sang and Les Amants du Pont-Neuf, Lavant starred opposite Juliette Binoche. In 1998, Lavant appeared in the Jonathan Glazer-directed video for the UNKLE song "Rabbit in Your Headlights", and in 1999, he played one of the lead roles in Beau Travail, directed by Claire Denis. In 2007, he appeared in Harmony Korine's Mister Lonely, in which he portrayed a Charlie Chaplin impersonator. Lavant, who does not speak English, took an intensive language course in preparation and learned his lines phonetically. His longtime associate Leos Carax appears in a supporting role as the main character's talent agent.

In 2008, Lavant and Carax re-united for the anthology film Tokyo!, which marked their first work together since Lovers on the Bridge and Carax's first major directing work in nearly a decade. Carax's segment for the film, called "Merde," starred Lavant as a violent monster who lives in the sewers of Tokyo and speaks in a gibberish language, venturing out occasionally to attack passersby.

In 2012, he starred in Leos Carax' film Holy Motors where he plays a "chameleonic actor on assignment, ferried around Paris in a white limousine and changing en route from beggar-woman to satyr to assassin to victim." The film was an entrant at the Cannes Film Festival.

In 2016, he starred in a 30-second clip directed by Yorgos Lanthimos to accompany the song "Identikit" by Radiohead.

In 2026, he starred in John Skoog's movie Redoubt (Värn) as the real-life farmer Karl-Göran Persson, a farmer teetering on the edge of madness who, at the peak of the Cold War, starts fortifying his house to build a fortress meant to protect himself and his neighbours, which causes a conflict with the people in the village.

== Filmography ==
Year	Title	Role	Director	Notes
1982	L'ombre sur la plage	Mathieu	Luc Béraud	TV movie
1982	Les Misérables	Montparnasse	Robert Hossein	
1983	Entre Nous	Soldier	Diane Kurys	
1983	The Wounded Man	Wanderer	Patrice Chéreau	
1983	Paris ficelle	Joe	Laurence Ferreira Barbosa	Short
1983	Au-delà de minuit	Voice	Pierre Barletta	Short
1984	Viva la vie	Caviar delivery man	Claude Lelouch	
1984	Boy Meets Girl	Alex	Leos Carax	
1985	Partir, revenir	Simon Lerner's patient	Claude Lelouch (2)	
1985	Hôtel du siècle	The statue	Jean Kerchbron	TV series (1 Episode)
1986	Cinéma 16	Jean-Pierre	François Dupont-Midi	TV series (1 Episode)
1986	Mauvais Sang	Alex	Leos Carax (2)	
1987	L'étendu		Gilles Marchand	Short
1988	Les enquêtes du commissaire Maigret	P'tit Louis	Jean Kerchbron (2)	TV series (1 Episode)
1989	Un tour de manège	Berville	Pierre Pradinas	
1989	Mona et moi	Pierre	Patrick Grandperret	
1991	Les Amants du Pont-Neuf	Alex	Leos Carax (3)	Nominated - European Film Award for Best Actor
1991	C'est merveilleux		Solange Martin	Short
1992	Drôle d'immeuble		Simon Pradinas	Short
1993	De force avec d'autres	Denis	Simon Reggiani	
1993	Fuis la nuit		Patrick Brunie	Short
1994	La partie d'échecs	Max	Yves Hanchar	Short
1995	L'ennemi	Higra	Hervé Renoh	Short
1995	Visiblement je vous aime	Denis	Jean-Michel Carré	
1997	Wild Animals	Emil	Kim Ki-duk	
1998	Don Juan	Pierrot	Jacques Weber	
1998	Le monde à l'envers	Yann	Rolando Colla	
1998	Cantique de la racaille	The hitchhiker	Vincent Ravalec	
1998	"Rabbit in Your Headlights"	Man	Jonathan Glazer	Music Video
1999	Beau travail	Galoup	Claire Denis	
1999	Tuvalu	Anton	Veit Helmer	Málaga International Week of Fantastic Cinema - Best Actor
2000	Deep in the Woods	Stéphane	Lionel Delplanque	
2000	La squale	The joker	Fabrice Genestal	
2001	Married/Unmarried	Love	Noli	
2001	Sofor	The driver	Guldem Durmaz	Short
2001	Affaire Libinski	Anatoli Libinski	Delphine Jaquet, Philippe Lacôte	Short
2002	Sous-commandant Père Noël		Christophe Vindis	Short
2002	La merveilleuse odyssée de l'idiot Toboggan	Voice	Vincent Ravalec (2)	
2004	Luminal	Ryu	Andrea Vecchiato	
2004	A Very Long Engagement	Six-Soux	Jean-Pierre Jeunet	
2004	Le soldat inconnu vivant	Voice	Joël Calmettes	TV movie
2004	Low Street	Old Man	Tom Petch	Short
2005	Camping sauvage	Blaise	Christophe Ali, Nicolas Bonilauri	
2006	Elegant		Daniel Wiroth	Short
2007	Le passeur		Philippe Lacôte (2)	Short
2007	Mister Lonely	Charlie Chaplin	Harmony Korine	
2007	Capitaine Achab	Captain Ahab	Philippe Ramos	
2007	Iyi Seneler Londra	Gerard	Berkun Oya	
2008	Tokyo!	Merde	Leos Carax (4)	
2008	Comment Albert vit bouger les montagnes		Harold Vasselin	
2009	Les Petits Meurtres d'Agatha Christie	André Custe	Eric Woreth	TV series (1 Episode)
2009	Les Williams		Alban Mench	Short
2009	Tamanrasset	Philippe	Merzak Allouache	TV movie
2009	The Temptation of St. Tony	Count Dionysos Korzybski	Veiko Õunpuu	
2009	Les cow-boys n'ont pas peur de mourir	Voice	Anne-Laure Daffis, Léo Marchand	Short
2009	Obsession(s)	Marc Douelec	Frédéric Tellier	TV movie
2010	Via	Denis	Leonore Mercier	Short
2010	Je, François Villon, voleur, assassin, poète	Bezon	Serge Meynard	TV movie
2010	Tandis qu'en bas des hommes en armes	Vilard	Samuel Rondière	Short
2010	HH, Hitler à Hollywood	Himself	Frédéric Sojcher	
2010	Io sono con te	Sapiente	Guido Chiesa	
2010	Enterrez nos chiens	Lucas	Frédéric Serve	
2011	Atlantika	Jack	Igor Voloshin	Short
2011	My Little Princess	Ernst	Eva Ionesco	
2011	Les amours perdues	Vincent	Samanou Acheche Sahlstrøm	Short
2011	Hop-o'-My-Thumb	The Ogre	Marina de Van	
2011	Waster		Philippe Prouff, Virginie Nallet	Short
2012	L'oeil de l'astronome	Kepler	Stan Neumann	
2012	Holy Motors	Mr. Oscar/ The Banker / The Beggar / The Motion Capture Actor / Monsieur Merde / The Father / The Accordionist / The Killer / The Killed / The Dying / The Man at Home	Leos Carax (5)	Chicago International Film Festival - Best Actor; Toronto Film Critics Association Award for Best Actor; Indiewire Critics' Poll - Best Performance; International Cinephile Society Awards - Best Actor; Nominated - César Award for Best Actor; Nominated - Boston Society of Film Critics Award for Best Actor; Nominated - Chicago Film Critics Association Award for Best Actor; Nominated - Italian Online Movie Award for Best Actor; Nominated - Los Angeles Film Critics Association Award for Best Actor; Nominated - Lumière Award for Best Actor; Nominated - National Society of Film Critics Award for Best Actor; Nominated - New York Film Critics Circle Award for Best Actor; Nominated - Online Film Critics Society Award for Best Actor; Nominated - Village Voice Film Poll - Best Actor; Nominated - International Online Cinema Awards - Best Actor
2012	L'étoile du jour	Elliot	Sophie Blondy	
2013	Barricade: le film			Short
2013	Fatigués d'être beaux	The duke	Anne-Laure Daffis (2), Léo Marchand (2)	Short
2013	Marussia	The tramp	Eva Pervolovici	
2013	Age of Uprising: The Legend of Michael Kohlhaas	The theologist	Arnaud des Pallières	
2013	Les grandes marées	Marc	Mathias Pardo	Short
2013	Méandres	Voice	Elodie Bouedec, Florence Miailhe, Mathilde Philippon-Aginski	Short
2013	Je sens plus la vitesse		Joanne Delachair	Short
2013	Jiminy	Otto Hoffmann	Arthur Môlard	Short
2014	Dassault, l'homme au pardessus	Marcel Dassault	Olivier Guignard	TV movie
2014	Journey to the West	Dragon	Tsai Ming-liang	
2014	Liberté, égalité, cheveux lissés	The white man	Elefterios Zakaropoulos	Short
2014	Agafay		Olivier Nikolcic	Short
2014	Iron Ivan	Eugene de Paris	Gleb Orlov	
2014	Le mystère des jonquilles	Sam	Jean-Pierre Mocky	
2014	Pitchipoï	Pierre Schulmann	Charles Najman	
2014	Fracas		Kévin Noguès	Short
2015	Graziella	Antoine	Mehdi Charef	
2015	Eva no duerme	Koenig	Pablo Agüero	
2015	Phasme	Jean	Maéva Ranaivojaona	Short
2015	History's Future	Lottery Ticket Seller	Fiona Tan	
2015	Me and Kaminski	Karl-Ludwig	Wolfgang Becker	
2015	21 Nights with Pattie	André	Arnaud Larrieu & Jean-Marie Larrieu	
2015	Full House	The Hangman	Quentin Bocksberger	Short
2016	Boris Without Béatrice (Boris sans Béatrice)	The Unknown	Denis Côté	
2016	Louis-Ferdinand Céline, deux clowns dans la catastrophe	Louis-Ferdinand Céline	Emmanuel Bourdieu	
2018	À nos pères	Monsieur Loyal	Franchin Don	
2018	The Mountain	Jack	Rick Alverson	
2018	The Emperor of Paris	Maillard	Jean-François Richet	
2018	The Night Eats the World	Alfred	Dominique Rocher	
2020	Night of the Kings (La Nuit des rois)	Silence	Philippe Lacôte	
2020	Gagarine	Gérard	Fanny Liatard and Jérémy Trouilh	
2022	Human Flowers of Flesh	Galoup	Helena Wittmann	
2024	It's Not Me		Leos Carax (6)	
2025	L'Étranger	Salamano	François Ozon	
2026	Redoubt (Värn)	Karl-Göran Persson	John Skoog	
2026	In the Night	Man	Mikai Karl	Music Video by Beck
