= Cécile de France =

Belgian actress (b. 1975)

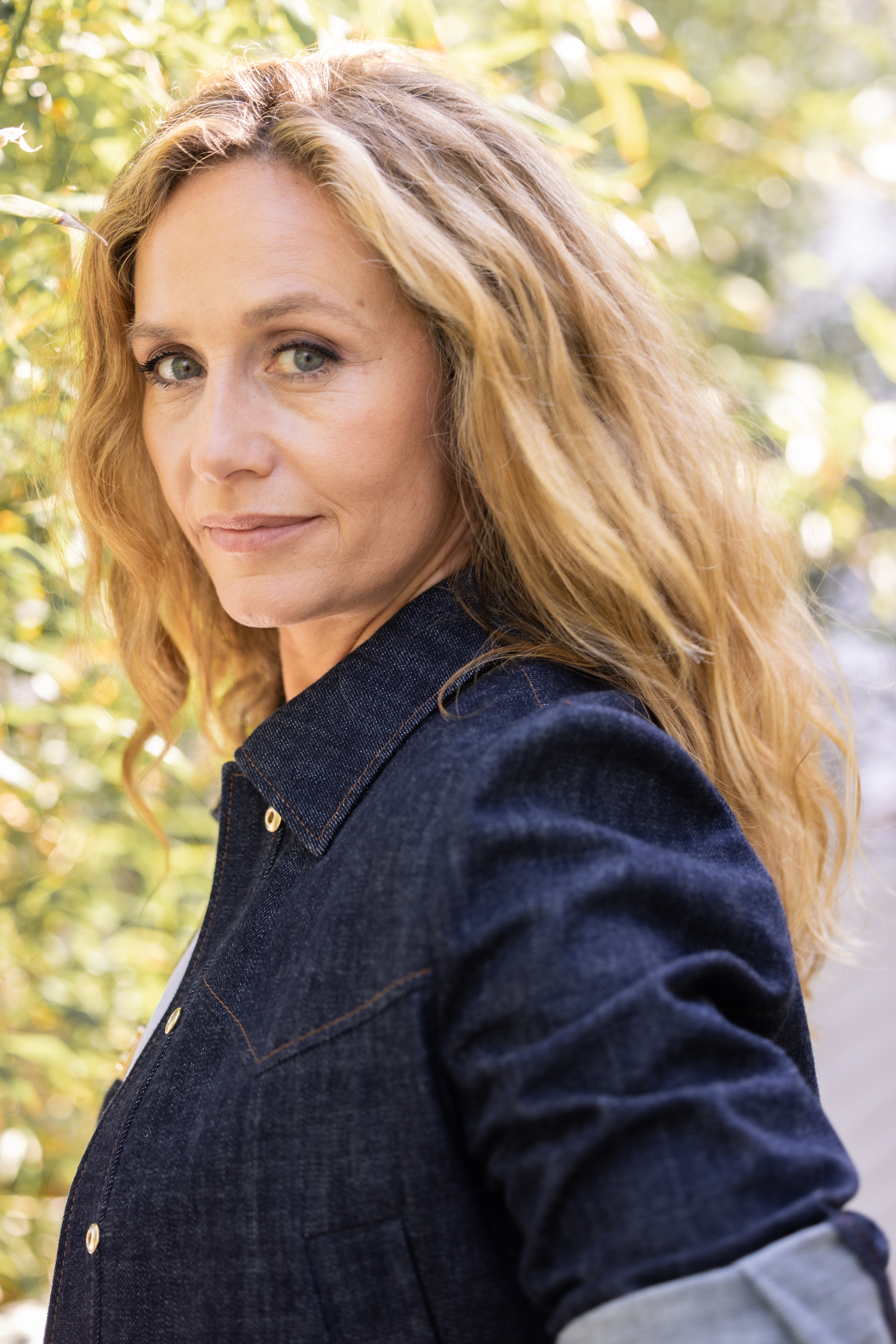
- De France at the 2025 Cannes Film Festival
- Born: 17 July 1975 (age 51); Namur, Belgium
- Occupation: Actress
- Years active: 1996–present
- Spouse: Guillaume Siron (m. 2006)
- Children: 2
- Website: www.cecile-de-france.com

Cécile de France (French: [sesil də fʁɑ̃s]; born 17 July 1975) is a Belgian actress. After achieving success in French cinema with hits such as L'Art (délicat) de la séduction (2001) and Irène (2002), she gained international attention for her lead roles in High Tension (2003) and Hereafter (2010).

== Life and career ==
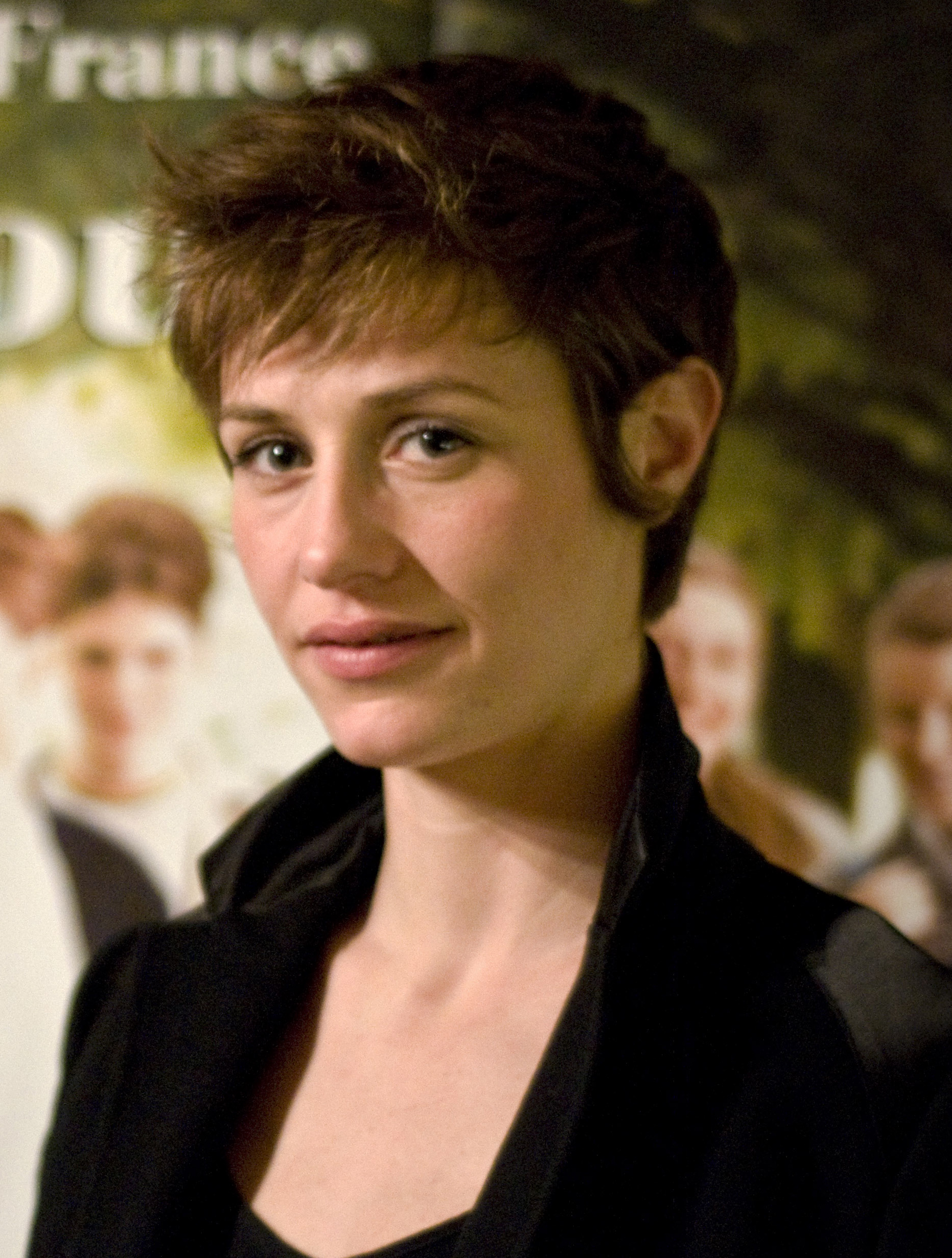
De France in 2009

Born in Namur, she left Belgium at the age of 17 to go to Paris where she studied theatre for two years with actor Jean Paul Denizon, assistant to British director Peter Brook. She then spent three years (1995–1998) at the acting academy ENSATT (École Nationale Supérieure des Arts et Techniques du Théâtre) in the Département Comédie first at the Rue Blanche in Paris, then in Lyon. She was discovered by the agent Dominique Besnehard and appeared in French hit films such as L'Art (délicat) de la séduction (2001) and Irène (2002).

Her international breakthrough came with the horror film High Tension (2003, UK title: Switchblade Romance, US title: High Tension). She caught the eye of Hollywood producers and soon landed her first major role in a US feature, Around the World in 80 Days (2004), in which she starred alongside Jackie Chan and Steve Coogan.

She won two César Awards for Most Promising Actress in L'Auberge espagnole (2002), and Best Supporting Actress in Les Poupées russes (2005). In 2014, she hosted the 39th César Awards ceremony.

She was selected to be on the jury for the Cinéfondation and short films sections of the 2015 Cannes Film Festival. She was also selected to be on the jury for the main competition section of the 68th Berlin International Film Festival.

Internationally, she has appeared in Hereafter (2010) directed by Clint Eastwood and The French Dispatch (2019) directed by Wes Anderson.

== Personal life ==
She has two children, Lino and Joy Siron, with musician Guillaume Siron.

== Filmography ==
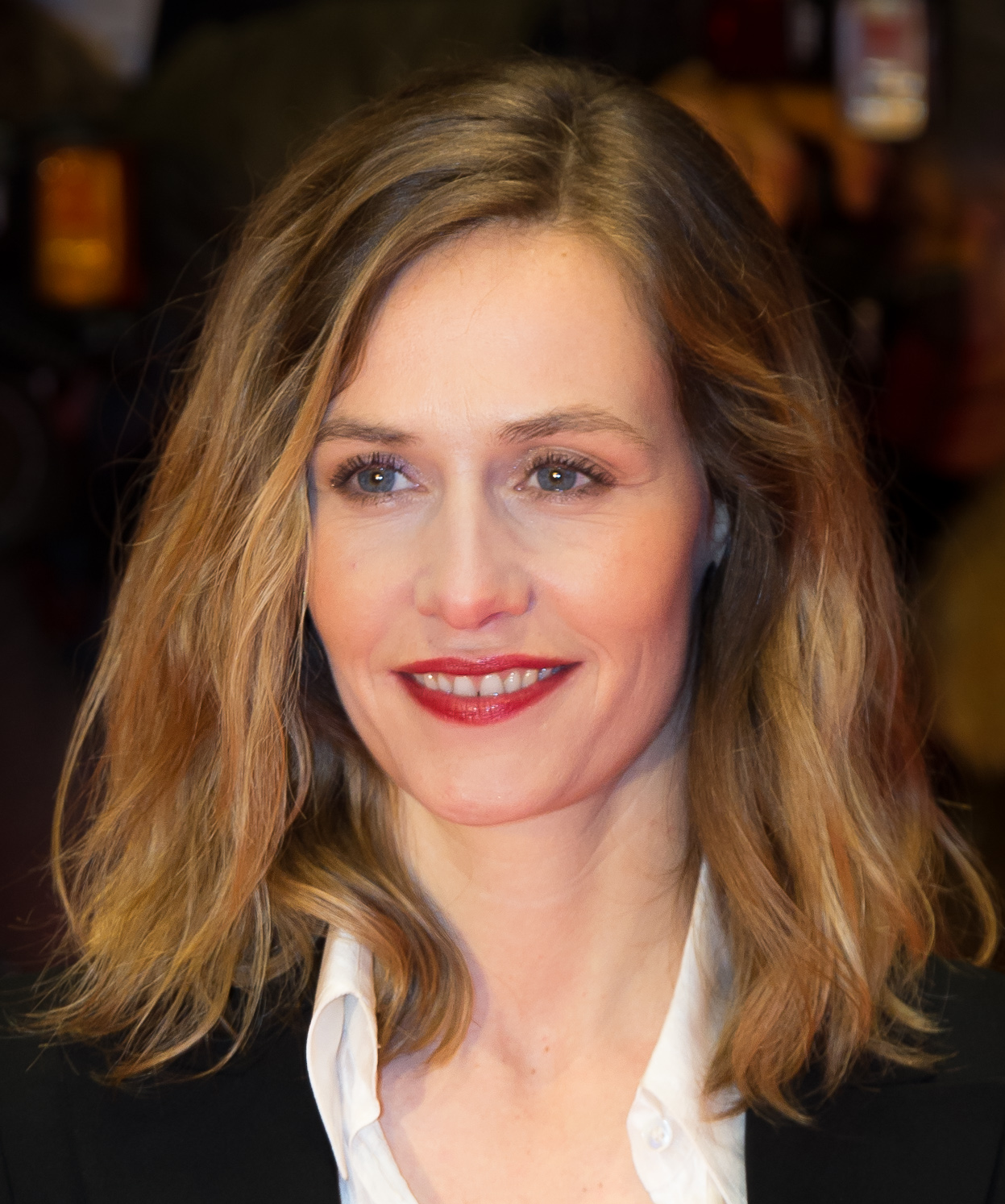
De France at the Berlinale 2017

=== Film ===
Year	Title	Role	Notes
2000	Regarde-moi (en face)	Dune	
2001	Toutes les nuits	The Prostitute	
2001	L'Art (délicat) de la séduction	Laure	
2002	L'Auberge espagnole	Isabelle	
2002	Irene	Irène	
2002	A+ Pollux	Pollux Lesiak	
2003	I, Cesar	Samantha	
2003	Kaena: The Prophecy	Kaena	Voice
2003	High Tension	Marie	
2004	Around the World in 80 Days	Monique La Roche	
2004	La Confiance règne	Chrystèle Burrel	
2005	Russian Dolls	Isabelle	
2006	Avenue Montaigne	Jessica	
2006	When I Was a Singer	Marion	
2006	The Colonel	Lieutenant Galois	
2006	Bad Faith	Clara Breitmann	
2007	Snow White: The Sequel	Snow White / Sleeping Beauty / Cinderella	Voice
2007	Gone for a Dance	Blanche	
2007	Hand of the Headless Man	Eva Sanders	
2007	A Secret	Tania Stirn / Grimbert	
2008	Mesrine	Jeanne Schneider	
2009	Sister Smile	Jeanine Deckers	
2010	Gardiens de l'ordre	Julie	
2010	Hereafter	Marie LeLay	
2011	The Kid with a Bike	Samantha	
2011	A Butterfly Kiss	Alice	
2011	Cars 2	Sally Carrera	Voice (French dubbed)
2012	Superstar	Fleur Arnaud	
2013	Chinese Puzzle	Isabelle	
2014	Möbius	Alice	
2015	In Harmony	Florence Kernel	
2015	Summertime	Carole	
2016	The Jungle Book	Raksha	French voice
2016	Fanny's Journey	Madame Forman	
2016	Term Life	Lucy	
2017	Django	Louise De Klerk	
2017	Just to Be Sure	Anna	
2018	Dolphin Reef	The Narrator	French voice
2018	Lady J	Madame De La Pommeraye	
2019	Rebelles	Sandra	
2019	Un monde plus grand	Corine	
2021	The French Dispatch	Mrs. B	
2021	Lost Illusions	Louise de Bargeton	
2021	Peaceful	Eugénie	
2022	The Young Lovers	Jeanne Escande	
2022	Wild Seas	Chiara	
2023	Bonnard, Pierre and Marthe	Marthe Bonnard	
2023	Second Tour	Nathalie Pove	
2024	Par amour	Sarah	
2024	Des baleines, des tortues et des hommes	Narrator	Voice
2025	The Residence	Clarissa	
2025	Colours of Time	Calixte de La Ferrière	
2026	Women on Trial (L'Affaire Marie-Claire)	Michèle Chevalier	

=== Short film ===
Year	Film
1997	Tous nos voeux de bonheur
2000	The Last Dream
2000	Bon appétit!
2001	Le Mariage en papier
2002	Loup!
2002	3 jours, 3 euros
2002	Il était une femme
2003	Nervous Breakdown
2004	La Nuit du 6 au 7
2004	Les Calamars n'écoutent plus la radi
2008	D'une vie à l'autre

=== Television ===
Year	Title	Role	Notes
1991	Cas de divorce	Gabrielle Clément	
1999	The Judge Is a Woman	Anna	
2001	Nana	Christine	Television film
2003	Petits mythes urbains	The Woman	
2007	La parure	Mathilde Loisel	
2011	Hard	Herself	
2014	Hidden Kingdoms	Narrator (French dubbed)	Documentary TV series
2015	Call My Agent!	Herself	TV series (1 Episode)
2016	The Young Pope	Sofia	Season 1
2019	The New Pope	Sofia	Season 2
2023	The Swarm	Dr. Cécile Roche	
2023	Greek Salad	Isabelle	2 episodes
2024	The Legends of Paris	Narrator	Voice

== Theatre ==
- 1996: Dormez je le veux by Georges Feydeau, directed by Benoît Blanpain
- 1996: Une palette rouge sang by Valeria Moretti, directed by Jean Paul Denizon
- 1996: Le songe d'une nuit d'été by William Shakespeare, directed by Pierre Pradinas
- 1997: Variations Strindberg-Feydeau, directed by Nada Strancar
- 1998: Pour nous, directed by Serguei Issayev
- 1998: Tu serais un ange tombé du ciel exprès pour nous by N. Sadour and A. Vampilov
- 1999, 2000: Electre, by Sophocle, directed by Claudia Stavisky
- 1999: Le baladin du monde occidental de John Millington Synge, directed by Philippe Delaigue
- 2001: Mademoiselle Julie by August Strindberg, directed by Gwenaël Morin
- 2001: SC35C, by Jean-Michel Frère

== Awards and nominations ==
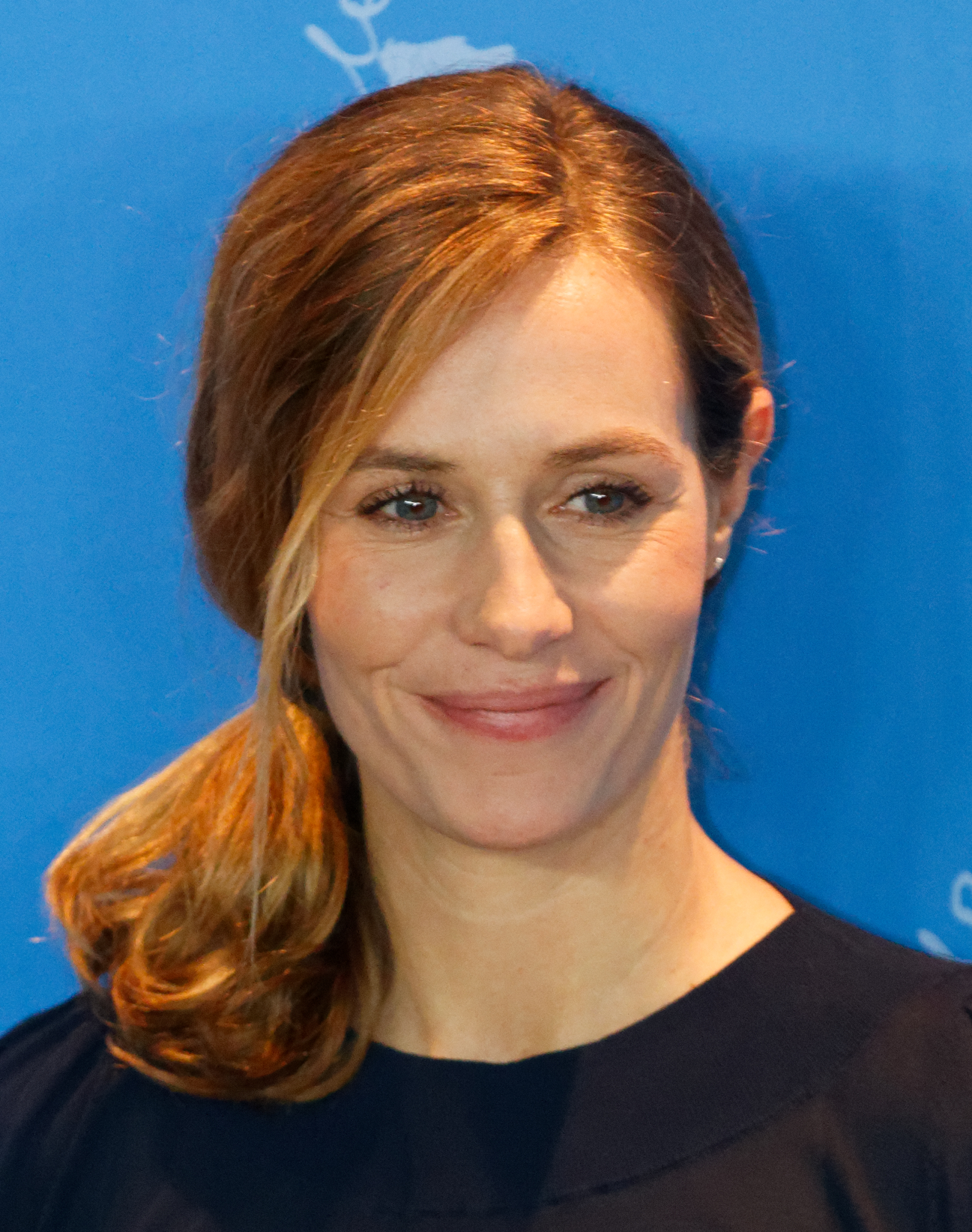
de France at the Berlinale 2017

Year	Award	Category	Work	Result
2000	Festival du Court Métrage de Bruxelles	Acting Award		Won
2002	César Award	Most Promising Actress	L'Auberge Espagnole	Won
2002	Lumière Awards	Most Promising Actress	L'Auberge Espagnole	Won
2003	Sitges Film Festival	Best Actress	High Tension	Won
2003	Shooting Stars Award			Won
2005	César Award	Best Supporting Actress	Russian Dolls	Won
2005	Prix Romy Schneider			Won
2007	Swann d'Or	Best Actress	Avenue Montaigne	Won
2007	César Award	Best Actress	Avenue Montaigne	Nominated
2007	Globes de Cristal Award	Best Actress	Avenue Montaigne	Nominated
2007	César Award	Best Actress	When I Was a Singer	Nominated
2007	Bayard d'Or Award	Best Actress	Hand of the Headless Man	Won
2008	César Award	Best Actress	A Secret	Nominated
2008	Globes de Cristal Award	Best Actress	A Secret	Won
2009	Magritte Award	Best Actress	Sister Smile	Nominated
2010	Saturn Award	Best Actress	Hereafter	Nominated
2011	European Film Award	Best Actress	The Kid with a Bike	Nominated
2011	Magritte Award	Best Actress	The Kid with a Bike	Nominated
2016	César Award	Best Actress	Summertime	Nominated
2018	Magritte Award	Best Actress	Just to Be Sure	Nominated
2019	Magritte Award	Best Actress	Mademoiselle de Joncquières	Nominated
2020	Magritte Award	Best Actress	A Bigger World	Nominated
2022	César Awards	Best Supporting Role	Lost Illusions	
