= L'Art (délicat) de la séduction =

2001 film by Richard Berry

- Film poster
- Directed by: Richard Berry
- Screenplay by: Richard Berry; Fabrice Roger-Lacan
- Based on: Kurtz by Jean-Marc Aubert
- Starring: Patrick Timsit; Cécile de France; Richard Berry
- Cinematography: Dominique Bouilleret
- Edited by: Anna Ruiz
- Music by: Éric Serra
- Production companies: StudioCanal; Blue Dahlia Productions; TF1 Films Production; J.M. Productions; Canal+
- Distributed by: CTV International
- Release date: 21 March 2001
- Running time: 97 minutes
- Country: France
- Language: French
- Budget: €5.6 million
- Box office: $2.3 million

L'Art (délicat) de la séduction (The (Delicate) Art of Seduction) is a 2001 French film directed by Richard Berry. The soundtrack for the film was composed by Éric Serra.

== Plot ==
The film follows Etienne (Patrick Timsit), a 40-year-old car designer, who takes time off from work to study sexual prowess from a Zen master (Alain Chabat) and several prostitutes, in the hopes of having the sexual skill to impress Laure (Cécile de France). Laure, a blonde who was introduced to him by his friend Jacques (Richard Berry), told Etienne on January 1 that she will not have sex with him until May 27 that year at precisely 9pm.

== Cast ==
- Patrick Timsit as Etienne
- Cécile de France as Laure
- Richard Berry as Jacques
- Alain Chabat as Maître Zen
- Jean-Pierre Darroussin as Monsieur Hubert
- Ludmila Mikaël as Alice
- Guilaine Londez as Real estate agent

== Reception ==
Lisa Nesselson from Variety gave a negative review of the film, stating it played "like a tepid cross between 'Rocky' and any number of prick-teasing comedies".
