= Belgian Rhapsody =

- Theatrical release poster
- Directed by: Vincent Bal
- Produced by: Peter Bouckaert
- Starring: Amaryllis Uitterlinden; Arthur Dupont
- Cinematography: Danny Elsen
- Edited by: Philippe Ravoet
- Music by: Steve Willaert
- Release date: 10 December 2014
- Running time: 100 minutes
- Country: Belgium
- Languages: French; Dutch

Belgian Rhapsody (French: Brabançonne) is a 2014 Belgian musical film directed by Vincent Bal.

== Cast ==
- Amaryllis Uitterlinden - Elke
- Arthur Dupont - Hugues
- Jos Verbist - Jozef Fonteyne
- Tom Audenaert - Andries
