= Eva Bal =

Dutch theatre director (1938–2021)

Eva Bal (also known as Eva Elisabeth, baroness Gerretsen) (June 25, 1938,The Hague - May 9, 2021) was a Dutch theater director, pioneer in the youth theater domain.

== Biography ==
=== Personal life ===
Eva Elisabeth Gerretsen was born on June 25, 1938, in The Hague. In 1960 she graduated in drama from the Hogeschool voor Dramatische Kunst in Utrecht. In 1966 she married August Bal, whose name she took and with whom she had three children: Martijn Bal, Sarah Bal (a psychologist and behavioural therapist) and Vincent Bal (a film director). August Bal died in 1984 and she later remarried, to Walter Mareen.

She died on May 9, 2021, after suffering for several years from Alzheimer's disease.

=== Career ===
She arrived in Belgium in 1961 to give courses in dramatic expression. She moved to Flanders in 1963 and worked for the Ministry of Culture to give new impetus to youth theatre.

In 1978, Bal founded the youth theatre centre Speelteater Gent, where young people and children could attend theatre workshops. In 1993, the center moved to Kopergietery, a former copper foundry in the centre of Ghent, and is now known under this name. She developed her method, "from improvisation to theatre".

She worked with Raymond Bossaerts, Frans Van der Aa and Mia Grijp, and travelled both domestically and internationally. She created performances for, among others, Jeugd & Theatre, the Beursschouwburg, the Arca Theater in Ghent and the Brussels Kamertoneel.

After Yugoslav War, she worked with children in Zagreb. She was a professor at the Hogeschool voor Theater in Maastricht and at the Ghent Conservatory. She co-founded the International Youth Theatre and was a member of the Raad voor Cultuur of the Flemish Community of Belgium.

In 2003, Eva Bal handed over the artistic direction of Kopergierty to Johan De Smet.

== Works ==
- 1976: Vreemd kind in je straat
- 1983: De Boot
- 1987: Wie troost Muu?
- 1991: Landschap van Laura (with Alain Platel)
- 1992: De tuin (with Alain Platel)

== Awards and influence ==
- Wanda Reumer Award
- Multiawarded with Signaal Award, in particular for Wie troost Muu?

On 3 September 2000, she was ennobled and elevated to the rank of baroness by King Albert II, for her commitment and pioneering work in youth theatre. Her motto was Het Kan. Director and choreographer Alain Platel considers that Eva Bal's influence extends beyond Europe: "Until Eva Bal, children were a kind of scenery in the theatre, with a few sentences of text. Eva took children very seriously and worked with them and for them at a high level".
