= Bus Palladium =

2010 french film

- Directed by: Christopher Thompson
- Screenplay by: Christopher Thompson; Thierry Klifa
- Produced by: Cyril Colbeau-Justin; Jean-Baptiste Dupont
- Starring: Marc-André Grondin; Elisa Sednaoui; Arthur Dupont; Géraldine Pailhas; François Civil; Jules Pélissier; Abraham Belaga
- Cinematography: Rémy Chevrin
- Edited by: Célia Lafitedupont
- Music by: Yarol Poupaud
- Production companies: LGM Productions; StudioCanal
- Distributed by: StudioCanal
- Release date: 17 March 2010 (France)
- Running time: 100 minutes
- Country: France
- Languages: French; English; Spanish
- Budget: $8.6 million
- Box office: $250.998

Bus Palladium is a 2010 French musical comedy-drama film written and directed by Christopher Thompson. It stars Marc-André Grondin, Elisa Sednaoui, and Arthur Dupont.

== Cast ==
- Marc-André Grondin as Lucas
- Arthur Dupont as Manu Pedraza
- Elisa Sednaoui as Laura
- Géraldine Pailhas as Prune Angelli
- François Civil as Mario
- Jules Pélissier as Jacob
- Abraham Belaga as Philippe
- Karole Rocher as Françoise
- Dominique Reymond as Marina
- Naomi Greene as Rizzo
- Noémie Lvovsky as The psy
- Solange Najman as Babcia
- Agathe Bonitzer as Myriam
- Xavier Pottier as Fifi
- Zara Prassinot as Sandra
- Clara Ponsot as Nathalie

== Accolades ==
Year	Award	Category	Recipient	Result
2011	César Awards	Most Promising Actor	Arthur Dupont	Nominated
2011	César Awards	Best Original Music	Yarol Poupaud	Nominated
