= The Butcher's Daughter =

- French: Tendre et saignant
- Directed by: Christopher Thompson
- Written by: Fabrice Roger-Lacan et Christopher Thompson
- Starring: Géraldine Pailhas; Arnaud Ducret
- Cinematography: Rémy Chevrin
- Music by: Arthur Simonini
- Production companies: Les Films du Cap, Orange Studio et G. Films
- Distributed by: UGC Distribution / Orange Studio (France)
- Release dates: 3 September 2020 (Angoulême Francophone Film Festival); 18 January 2022 (France)
- Running time: 91 minutes
- Country: France
- Language: French

The Butcher's Daughter (French: Tendre et saignant) is a French film directed by Christopher Thompson (actor). It had a cinema release in France the 18 January 2022.

== Plot ==
On the death of her father, Charly Fleury inherits the family butcher's shop. Editor-in-chief of a fashion magazine, she prefers to sell the business as soon as possible. Martial, her father's former assistant manager, decides to fight to recover the butcher's shop. While everything opposes them, Charly and Martial will have to learn live together.

== Cast ==
- Géraldine Pailhas : Charly Fleury
- Arnaud Ducret : Martial Toussaint
- Alison Wheeler : Carole Katayan
- Stéphane De Groodt : Miguel Amestoy
- Jean-François Stévenin : Jacques Fleury
- Antoine Gouy : Yves de la Closerie
- Élisa Ruschke : Julia
- Anne Le Ny : Madame Keller
- Antony Hickling : Sid Kharish

== Production ==
Principal photography began on 12 November 2019 and concluded on 23 December 2019. Filming took place in the Cantal department, including in Aurillac, Lacapelle-Viescamp and Saint-Vincent-de-Salers, as well as in Paris.
