= Young & Beautiful =

2013 film by François Ozon

- Theatrical release poster
- French: Jeune & Jolie
- Directed by: François Ozon
- Written by: François Ozon
- Produced by: Éric Altmayer; Nicolas Altmayer
- Starring: Marine Vacth; Géraldine Pailhas; Frédéric Pierrot; Charlotte Rampling; Johan Leysen; Fantin Ravat; Nathalie Richard; Laurent Delbecque
- Cinematography: Pascal Martin
- Edited by: Laure Gardette
- Music by: Philippe Rombi
- Production company: Mandarin Cinéma
- Distributed by: Mars Distribution
- Release dates: 16 May 2013 (Cannes); 21 August 2013 (France)
- Running time: 93 minutes
- Country: France
- Language: French
- Budget: €4.6 million ($5 million)
- Box office: $9.8 million

Young & Beautiful (French: Jeune & Jolie) is a 2013 French erotic drama film written and directed by François Ozon. It stars Marine Vacth as Isabelle, a teenage prostitute, and features supporting performances by Johan Leysen, Géraldine Pailhas, Frédéric Pierrot and Charlotte Rampling. The film was nominated for the Palme d'Or at the 2013 Cannes Film Festival, and received praise from film critics. It was shown at the 2013 Toronto International Film Festival.

== Plot ==
While on a summer holiday with her family in the south of France, 16-year-old Isabelle decides to lose her virginity to a German boy named Felix. The experience leaves her unsatisfied and dissociated. Her family and another family living in their house throw Isabelle a party when she turns 17. Isabelle is reserved and secretive around her family, especially with her overbearing mother Sylvie, who thinks she knows what is best for Isabelle. By the autumn, she is working as a part-time prostitute. She meets clients at high-class hotels under the pseudonym Léa and lies about her age, telling her clients that she is 20 years old. Among Isabelle's clients is a 63-year-old man named Georges, whom she likes due to fact that he is kind to her. During one of their meetings, he dies of a heart attack while they are having sex. Isabelle tries to resuscitate him, but fails and leaves out of shock. In winter the police turn up and inform Sylvie about Isabelle being a prostitute and Georges's death. When Isabelle arrives home, Sylvie reveals that she knows everything and flies into a rage, repeatedly slapping Isabelle before apologizing and grounding her. Sylvie and Isabelle are now estranged. Isabelle has to give a statement to the police. She says she was first approached by a man on the street to have sex for money, but found it disgusting. After seeing a report about students making money as prostitutes she set up a website, bought a second phone and went into business. As a minor she is the victim and will not be charged, but her mother will keep the money. Sylvie takes Isabelle to see a therapist (Serge Hefez) to help her deal with what happened, including her guilt because she thinks she killed Georges.

After Isabelle quits prostitution she lives a normal teenage life and works as a babysitter. In spring, she meets Alex at a party and they start dating. They have sex, and she has to help him out. Afterwards she breaks up with Alex saying she does not love him. Isabelle reactivates her phone's SIM card and checks messages for Léa from clients. Georges's widow Alice found Léa's number in her husband's address book and requested an appointment at the hotel. When she arrives, Alice explains the situation and says she wants to see the room and meet the girl Georges was with when he died. She does not blame Isabelle because she knew he saw other women, was ill and thinks dying while making love is a beautiful death. They go to the room; Alice tells Isabelle to leave her clothes on and lie with her on the bed. Isabelle says that she needed to come to the room as well. Alice kindly caresses Isabelle's face; Isabelle falls asleep. She wakes up alone looking more at peace.

== Cast ==
- Marine Vacth as Isabelle/Léa
- Johan Leysen as Georges Ferriere, Isabelle's elderly client
- Frédéric Pierrot as Patrick, Isabelle's stepfather
- Géraldine Pailhas as Sylvie, Isabelle's mother
- Jeanne Ruff as Claire, Isabelle's best friend
- Nathalie Richard as Véronique
- Charlotte Rampling as Alice Ferriere, Georges' widow
- Akéla Sari as Mouna
- Lucas Prisor as Felix, a German tourist
- Fantin Ravat as Victor, Isabelle's brother
- Laurent Delbecque as Alex, Isabelle's boyfriend
- Carole Franck as The Cop

== Reception ==
=== Critical response ===
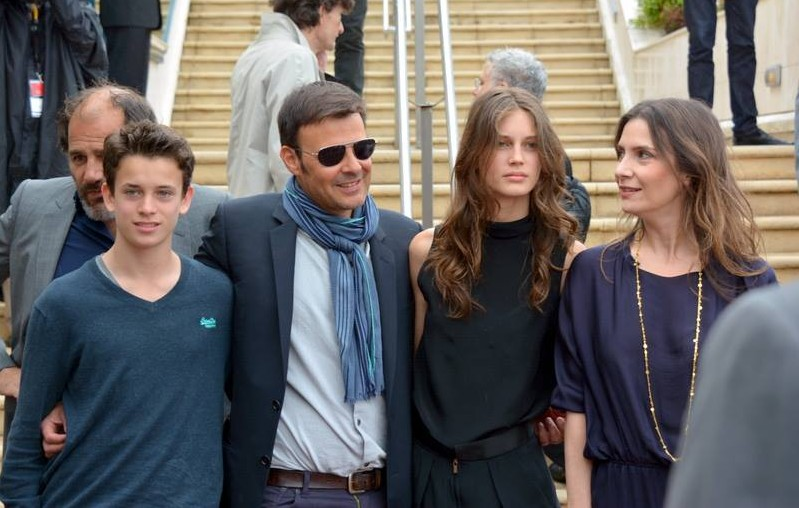
François Ozon (second from left) with Fantin Ravat, Marine Vacth, and Géraldine Pailhas at the 2013 Cannes Film Festival. Frédéric Pierrot can be seen behind Ravat.

Upon its premiere at the 2013 Cannes Film Festival, Young & Beautiful received critical acclaim. David Rooney of The Hollywood Reporter praised Vacth's leading role and predicted that the film would "land her major exposure on the casting radar". While drawing comparisons to Ozon's 2012 film In the House Rooney wrote, "[U]nlike that playful Hitchcockian quasi-thriller, Young & Beautiful is both more carnal and more sober, suggesting the danger and fragility inherent in the central character's experimentation while keeping the dramatic intensity subdued." Leslie Felperin of Variety noted that the film was "a nuanced, emotionally temperate study of a precocious youth" and added that "its elegant execution will win warm regard [and the] subject matter should lure audiences at art houses worldwide."

Derek Malcolm of London Evening Standard wrote that Ozon was successful in "directing the slim and striking Vacth through a series of sex scenes, and also showing how the girl doesn't really know what she is doing even when pretty experienced in the art of seduction." While being appreciative of the film as a whole, Peter Bradshaw of The Guardian noted that the film was a "luxurious fantasy of a young girl's flowering: a very French and very male fantasy, like the pilot episode of the world's classiest soap opera."

Rotten Tomatoes gives the film a score of 73% based on reviews from 82 critics, with an average rating of 6.74/10. The site's consensus reads: "Ozon may not explore his themes as fully as he should, but Young & Beautiful poses enough intriguing questions -- and features a strong enough performance from Marine Vatch -- to compensate for its frustrations". On Metacritic the film has a score of 63 out of 100, based on reviews from 27 critics, indicating "generally favorable reviews".

=== Accolades ===
List of Awards received by Young & Beautiful
Award / Film Festival	Category	Recipients	Result
San Sebastián International Film Festival	TVE Otra Mirada Award	François Ozon	Won
Silver Condor	Best Non Spanish Film	François Ozon	Nominated

== Music ==
The film takes place over the course of a year and is divided into four segments, each separated by a song of Françoise Hardy: "L'amour d'un garçon", "A quoi ça sert?", "Première rencontre", and "Je suis moi".
