= Bardot (TV series) =

2023 television series

- Genre: Drama
- Created by: Danièle Thompson; Christopher Thompson
- Written by: Danièle Thompson; Christopher Thompson
- Directed by: Danièle Thompson; Christopher Thompson
- Starring: Julia de Nunez
- Country of origin: France
- Original language: French
- No. of episodes: 6

Production
- Producers: Pascal Breton; Judith Rochelois; Ariel Zeitoun
- Running time: 52 minutes
- Production companies: Federation; GFilms

Original release
- Network: France 2
- Release: 8 May 2023

Bardot (English: /bɑːrˈdoʊ/, French: [baʁdo]) is a French television drama series about the actress and model Brigitte Bardot. It was created and directed by Danièle Thompson and Christopher Thompson, and stars the newcomer Julia de Nunez in the title role. The six 52-minute episodes were broadcast on France 2 from May 8, 2023.

== Plot ==
The serial follows the career of the actress and model Brigitte Bardot, from her first casting at the age of 15 until the filming of Henri-Georges Clouzot's film La Vérité (1960) ten years later.

== Cast ==
- Julia de Nunez as Brigitte Bardot
- Victor Belmondo as Roger Vadim
- Jules Benchetrit as Sami Frey
- Géraldine Pailhas as Anne-Marie Mucel, Brigitte Bardot's mother
- Hippolyte Girardot as Louis Bardot, Brigitte Bardot's father
- Yvan Attal as Raoul Lévy
- Anne Le Ny as Olga Horstig
- Louis-Do de Lencquesaing as Henri-Georges Clouzot
- Laurent Stocker as Pierre Lazareff
- Oscar Lesage as Jacques Charrier
- Noham Edje as Jean-Louis Trintignant
- Fabian Wolfrom as Sacha Distel
- Mikaël Mittelstadt as Gilbert Bécaud

== Production ==
Bardot was created, written and directed by Danièle Thompson and Christopher Thompson. It was produced by Pascal Breton and Judith Rochelois for Federation and co-produced by GFilms. Principal photography took place in Saint-Tropez from 11 April to 6 May 2022 and continued in the Paris region until 13 June.

The identity of the lead actress, the newcomer Julia de Nunez, was kept secret until the end of May 2022. The first picture of her in the role of Bardot was released on 13 June 2022.
