= Louis-Ferdinand Céline (film) =

Louis-Ferdinand Céline, sometimes with the subititle Two Clowns for a Catastrophe (French: Deux clowns pour une catastrophe), is a 2016 French drama film directed by Emmanuel Bourdieu, starring Denis Lavant, Géraldine Pailhas and Philip Desmeules. It is set in Denmark in 1948 and is about the French writer Louis-Ferdinand Céline, who was in exile with his wife and cat while accused of collaboration during the German occupation of France.

The film is based on the book The Crippled Giant by the American Jewish scholar Milton Hindus, who admired Céline's writings, met him in Denmark in 1948 and described him as a wreck. The film raised discussions about Céline's legacy in France.

== Cast ==
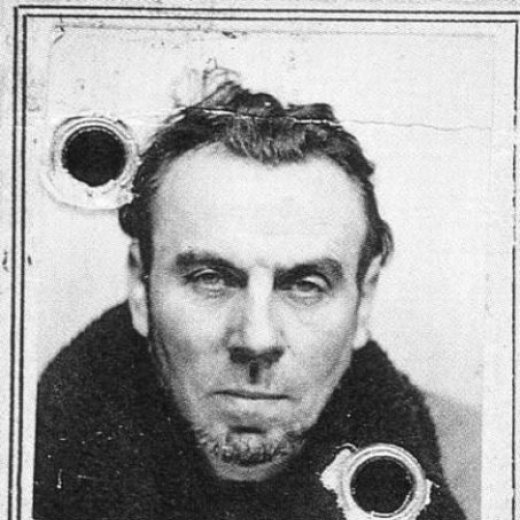
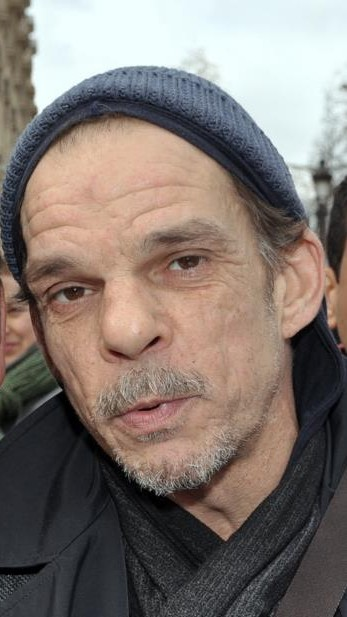
Céline around 1944 and Lavant in 2013
- Denis Lavant as Louis-Ferdinand Céline
- Géraldine Pailhas as Lucette
- Philip Desmeules as Milton Hindus
