= Don't Worry, I'm Fine =

- Film poster
- Directed by: Philippe Lioret
- Written by: Olivier Adam; Philippe Lioret
- Produced by: Christophe Rossignon
- Starring: Mélanie Laurent; Kad Merad
- Cinematography: Sascha Wernik
- Edited by: Andrea Sedláčková
- Music by: Nicola Piovani
- Distributed by: Mars Distribution
- Release date: 6 September 2006
- Running time: 100 minutes
- Country: France
- Language: French
- Budget: $4.6 million
- Box office: $6.3 million

Don't Worry, I'm Fine (French: Je vais bien, ne t'en fais pas) is a 2006 French drama film directed by Philippe Lioret based on the 2000 novel of the same name by Olivier Adam.

== Plot ==
Lili, a 19-year-old, discovers her twin brother Loïc has left the house after a violent argument with their father when she gets home from vacation. Lili and her brother had a close bond, so when she suddenly lost contact with him, she was devastated. She assumed that something had happened to her brother.

Lili stops eating and begins losing strength and ends up in the hospital where she has decided to stop living at all. She receives a letter from Loïc where he apologizes for leaving without a word or getting back to her and makes it very clear that he will not be coming back. He also says that he has been traveling around living on petty jobs and blames their father for his lot in life. Lili recovers and begins looking for her twin by following the trail of the letters she has received along with Thomas, the boyfriend of her friend from school, Lea. Lili and Thomas gradually fall in love.

When Lili goes to Saint Aubin with Thomas, she sees her father mailing letters, concluding that her father was imitating Loïc's handwriting and sending letters to Lili, in an attempt to protect her and keep her alive. Coincidentally, Thomas, when visiting his grandmother's grave, sees Loïc's gravestone. When Thomas arrives at Lili's house for a family lunch, he speaks with her parents, mentioning that he knows of Loïc's death. They reveal that Loïc had died in an accident during mountain climbing, and they plead for Thomas not to tell Lili anything. Thomas believes that they are crazy. Lili, who arrives home shortly after to meet Thomas and her parents for the lunch, finds her brother's guitar hidden in her father's car. Knowing he would never have left behind his beloved guitar, she learns that he can not just have gone away.

Even though both Lili and Thomas know the truth by now, they don't talk about it, even though Loïc has been the most important thing on their minds for the past year. They talk about leaving the city and going to the sea.

== Cast ==
- Mélanie Laurent as Lili
- Kad Merad as Paul
- Julien Boisselier as Thomas
- Isabelle Renauld as Isabelle
- Aïssa Maïga as Léa
- Martine Chevallier as The first nurse
- Thibault de Montalembert as The psychiatrist
- Pierre-Benoist Varoclier as The driver

== Reception ==
The film had positive reviews.

== Awards and nominations ==
- César Awards
  - Won: Best Actor – Supporting Role (Kad Merad)
  - Won: Most Promising Actress (Mélanie Laurent)
  - Nominated: Best Director (Philippe Lioret)
  - Nominated: Best Film
  - Nominated: Best Adaptation (Olivier Adam and Philippe Lioret)
- Lumière Awards
  - Won: Most Promising Actor (Julien Boisselier)
  - Won: Most Promising Actress (Mélanie Laurent)
- Prix Romy Schneider for Mélanie Laurent
