= Gabrielle Lazure =

American-Canadian actress (born 1957)

- Gabrielle Lazure in 1987
- Born: 28 April 1957 (age 69); Philadelphia, Pennsylvania, United States
- Occupation: Actress
- Years active: 1981–present

Gabrielle Lazure (born 28 April 1957) is an American-Canadian actress. She has appeared in more than sixty films since 1981.

== Filmography ==
=== Film ===
Gabrielle Lazure film credits
Year	Title	Role	Notes	Ref.
1981	Chaste and Pure	Lisetta	Originally: Casta e pura	
1983	La Belle captive	Marianne	English: The Beautiful Prisoner	
1983	Coverup	Sybille Berger	Originally: La crime	
1984	The Beasts	Bela	Originally: Les Fauves	
1984	Souvenirs, souvenirs	Hélène		
1985	Joshua Then and Now	Pauline Shapiro		
1989	La Révolution française	Princess de Lamballe		
2003	The Pharmacist	Martine	Originally: Le pharmacien de garde	
2003	The Fugitive	Vicky	Originally: Il fuggiasco, AKA Runaway	
2004	Crimson Rivers II: Angels of the Apocalypse	La femme de Philippe		
2004	Sin's Kitchen	Joanna	Spanish: Cocina de Pecados	
2004	Secret Agents	Véronique Lipovsky	AKA Spy Bound	
2005	The Passenger	Vin Tanner		
2006	A City Is Beautiful at Night	Régine	Originally: C'est beau une ville la nuit	
2008	La saison des orphelins	l'institutrice	English: The Season of the Orphans	
2009	The Master Key	Christine Foucault	Originally: Grande Ourse : La Clé des possibles	
2011	Down the Shore	Brigitte Lebeau		
2011	A Happy Event	Édith		
2012	Arbitrage	Sandrine Côte		
2013	Passer l'hiver	Claire		
2015	Rabid Dogs	Marie		
2015	Despite the Night	The Mother		
2019	A Way of Life	Colette	Originally: Une manière de vivre	
2021	Woman in Car	Charlotte		
2026	Nobody's Violence	Unknown		

=== Television ===
Gabrielle Lazure television credits
Year	Title	Role	Notes	Ref.
1988	The Mills of Power	Simone Fontaine	TV miniseries (6 episodes). Originally: Les Tisserands du pouvoir	
1991	The Final Heist	Gabrielle Delon	TV movie	
1995	Les louves	Jeanne	TV movie	
1996	Reckoning	Molloy	TV movie. Originally: Lifeline	
1998	30 Years To Life	Kate	TV movie	
2018–2024	Chronicles of the Sun	Marie Estrela	Regular role	
