= The Zigzag Kid =

- Theatrical release poster
- Directed by: Vincent Bal
- Screenplay by: Vincent Bal; Jon Gilbert
- Based on: The Zigzag Kid by David Grossman
- Produced by: Burny Bos; Els Vandevorst
- Starring: Thomas Simon; Isabella Rossellini; Burghart Klaußner
- Cinematography: Walther Vanden Ende
- Edited by: Peter Alderliesten
- Music by: Thomas de Prins
- Production companies: BosBros; N279 Entertainment; AVRO
- Distributed by: Benelux Film Distributors
- Release dates: 9 September 2012 (Toronto); 3 October 2012 (Netherlands)
- Running time: 95 minutes
- Countries: Netherlands; Belgium
- Languages: English; French; Dutch
- Box office: $75,544

The Zigzag Kid (Dutch: Nono, Het Zigzag Kind) is a 2012 Dutch-Belgian family adventure film directed by Vincent Bal and starring Thomas Simon (as the title character) and Isabella Rossellini. The film is based on the novel of the same name by David Grossman.

== Plot ==
Nono, the son of the best police inspector in the world, would like to be like his father and for this he always ends up getting into trouble. Shortly before his Bar Mitzvah, Nono is sent to his uncle, who has been given the task of getting him back on the right path, but during the train ride he finds himself involved in an exciting adventure.

== Cast ==
- Thomas Simon as Nono
- Isabella Rossellini as Lola
- Burghart Klaußner as Felix
- Fedja van Huêt as Jacob
- Camille De Pazzis as Zohara
- Jessica Zeylmaker as Gaby

== Reception ==
Marci Schmitt of the Star Tribune gave the film four stars. Grace Montgomery of Common Sense Media gave the film four stars out of five. Rob Hunter of Film School Rejects gave the film a positive review, referring to it as "a fun adventure more than anything else, and it succeeds wonderfully."
