= Lady Chatterley (film) =

- Theatrical release poster
- Directed by: Pascale Ferran
- Written by: Roger Bohbot; Pascale Ferran
- Produced by: Gilles Sandoz
- Starring: Marina Hands; Jean-Louis Coulloc'h; Hippolyte Girardot; Hélène Alexandridis
- Cinematography: Julien Hirsch
- Music by: Béatrice Thiriet
- Distributed by: Ad Vitam Distribution (France)
- Release date: 1 November 2006 (France)
- Running time: 168 minutes 220 minutes (extended European edition)
- Country: France
- Language: French
- Budget: $2.3 million
- Box office: $4.7 million

Lady Chatterley is a 2006 French drama film by Pascale Ferran. The film is an adaptation of the 1927 novel John Thomas and Lady Jane, an earlier version of Lady Chatterley's Lover (1928), by D. H. Lawrence. It was released in France on 1 November 2006, followed by limited release in the U.S. on 22 June 2007 and in the UK on 24 August 2007. The longer "European Extended Edition" was released on DVD and some streaming platforms in the United States.

The film won the 2007 César Award for Best Film and stars Jean-Louis Coulloc'h and Marina Hands.

== Plot ==
In an English country house, Sir Clifford Chatterley lives with his wife Constance. Severely wounded in World War I, he is paralyzed from the waist down and uses a wheelchair. Constance tries to be a good wife, but he is distant and her life is empty. One day the maid is ill and Constance goes to see Parkin, the gamekeeper, about some pheasants for the table. Approaching the hut in the woods where he works, she sees him stripped to the waist and washing himself; the sight perturbs her.

She is falling into a depression, for which the doctor says there is no physical cause, urging her to take charge of her life and not give in as her mother did. Told that the first daffodils are blooming in the woods, she ventures out to pick some, but the effort tires her and she has to sit. Parkin grudgingly lets her rest on the steps of the hut, where she falls asleep. Feeling relaxed there, she resolves to visit more often and asks her husband for a duplicate key. He says he does not have one, so Constance asks Parkin, who is reluctant but as an employee has to, in the end, produce one.

She starts going to the hut regularly, taking an interest in the taciturn Parkin's work. When taking hold of a recently hatched pheasant chick, the tremor of new life in her hand sets Constance weeping uncontrollably. Parkin comforts her and, with her mute assent, has brief forceful sex. He is uneasy afterwards, but Constance feels liberated and starts meeting him secretly for more sessions. As he gets more comfortable with her, their lovemaking becomes more tender and intense, one day cavorting naked in the rain and decorating each other with flowers.

Sir Clifford confronts Constance with a rumor that she is pregnant, which she denies. The two discuss the possibility of her conceiving a child with another man, giving her a baby and Sir Clifford an heir. She says she might do so when she goes on holiday with her father and sister to the Mediterranean. Taking more of an interest in life, Sir Clifford buys a motorized wheelchair and ventures into the woods, but it gets stuck and stalls. In rage and frustration, he will let nobody help him, though eventually Constance and Parkin do push him home.

Before going off on holiday, Constance spends the whole night with Parkin in his cottage, from which he has cleared all traces of his wife, who has gone to live with another man. She tells him she has money from her dead mother and would like to buy him a small farm so that he could be independent. While on holiday, Constance gets a letter from Sir Clifford's nurse with all the local gossip. This includes the news that Parkin's wife, thrown out by her lover, returned to their home. Parkin went to court to get her thrown out, but was told he would have to divorce her first.

Constance heads back to England to find that Sir Clifford has been making further efforts to live more normally and has begun to walk on crutches. She also learns that, in a fight with the lover, Parkin was beaten up and, because of the scandal, has had to resign as gamekeeper. Going to see Parkin, she tells him she is pregnant, but he is not happy because the child will, in the eyes of the law, be Sir Clifford's. Having lost his job and his home, he will have to live with his mother and find work in a factory. He talks of emigrating to Canada, but Constance says that is no solution and wants him near her. Eventually, he accepts her offer of buying him a small farm and agrees that they must part until the baby is born. If she then decides to leave Sir Clifford, he says he will take her.

== Cast ==
- Marina Hands as Lady Chatterley
- Jean-Louis Coulloc'h as Parkin
- Hippolyte Girardot as Sir Clifford Chatterley
- Hélène Alexandridis as Mrs. Bolton
- Hélène Fillières as Hilda
- Bernard Verley as Sir Malcolm
- Sava Lolov as Tommy Dukes
- Jean-Baptiste Montagut as Harry Winterslow
- Fanny Deleuze as Aunt Eva
- Michel Vincent as Marshall
- Colette Philippe as Mrs. Marshall
- Christelle Hes as Kate
- Joël Vandael as Field
- Jean-Claude Leclère as Winter
- Ninon Brétécher as Emma Flint
- Léopold Cannon and Jade Greil as baby Flint
- Jean-Baptiste de Laubier as Duncan Forbes
- Jean-Michel Vovk as Albert Adam
- Marina-Aymée Philippe as Bertha Parkin
- Anne Benoît as the merchant
- Tom Gibson as les mineur

== Production ==
The film was shot in France's former Limousin region, at the Château de Montméry in Ambazac (Haute-Vienne) and in Marcillac-la-Croisille (Corrèze).

== Awards ==
- Louis Delluc Prize
- César Awards
  - Best Film
  - Best Actress – Marina Hands
  - Best Cinematography – Julien Hirsch
  - Best Costume Design – Marie-Claude Altot
  - Best Adaptation – Roger Bohbot, Pascale Ferran and Pierre Trividic
