= When I Was a Singer =

- Directed by: Xavier Giannoli
- Written by: Xavier Giannoli
- Produced by: Pierre-Ange Le Pogam; Edouard Weil
- Starring: Gérard Depardieu; Cécile De France
- Cinematography: Yorick Le Saux
- Edited by: Martine Giordano
- Music by: Alexandre Desplat
- Distributed by: EuropaCorp Distribution
- Release date: 26 May 2006
- Running time: 112 minutes
- Country: France
- Language: French
- Box office: $10,205,575

When I Was a Singer (French: Quand j'étais chanteur) is a 2006 French romantic drama film starring Gérard Depardieu and Cécile de France. It was written and directed by Xavier Giannoli.

== Plot ==
Alain Moreau, a middle-aged crooner who only ever had local success, performs for one of the few remaining dance-bands in Clermont-Ferrand. Though he retains a core group of female admirers who consider him something of an idol, he has a melancholic awareness of the slow disappearance of that audience and of his advancing years. He is completely knocked off balance when he meets strikingly attractive and much younger businesswoman Marion. She seems distant and apparently otherwise involved but soon shows quiet signs of reciprocating his interest. A brief dalliance turns into something much more complicated and he starts to employ - indeed monopolise - her services as an estate agent by announcing he suddenly must move house.

== Cast ==
- Gérard Depardieu as Alain Moreau
- Cécile De France as Marion
- Mathieu Amalric as Bruno
- Christine Citti as Michèle
- Patrick Pineau as Daniel
- Alain Chanone as Philippe Mariani
- Christophe as himself
- Jean-Pierre Gos as The mayor

== Awards and nominations ==
- Cannes Film Festival (France)
  - Nominated: Golden Palm (Xavier Giannoli)
- César Awards (France)
  - Won: Best Sound (Gabriel Hafner and François Musy)
  - Nominated: Best Actor – Leading Role (Gérard Depardieu)
  - Nominated: Best Actress – Leading Role (Cécile De France)
  - Nominated: Best Actress – Supporting Role (Christine Citti)
  - Nominated: Best Editing (Martine Giordano)
  - Nominated: Best Film
  - Nominated: Best Original Screenplay (Xavier Giannoli)

== Alternative titles ==
Quand j'étais chanteur was released in the United Kingdom under the title The Singer.
