= Géraldine Pailhas =

French actress (born 1971)

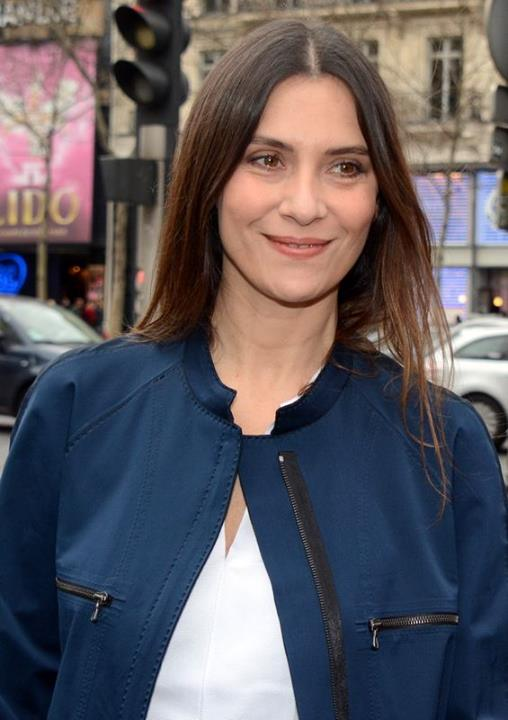
- Pailhas in 2014
- Born: 8 January 1971 (age 55); Marseille, France
- Occupation: Actress
- Spouse: Christopher Thompson
- Children: 2

Géraldine Pailhas (born 8 January 1971) is a French actress.

== Career ==
In 1992, she won the César Award for Most Promising Actress for her role in La neige et le feu, directed by Claude Pinoteau.

She had her first international success in the 1994 romantic comedy-drama film Don Juan DeMarco. The following year, she starred in Le Garçu, directed by Maurice Pialat, alongside Gérard Depardieu.

In 1999, she played in Peut-être, directed by Cédric Klapisch, with Jean-Paul Belmondo and Romain Duris.

In 2002, she played Christine Faure in the movie The Adversary, directed by Nicole Garcia, and starring Daniel Auteuil.

She was nominated two times for the César Award for Best Supporting Actress : in 2004, for The Cost of Living, directed by Philippe Le Guay and in 2014, for Young & Beautiful, directed by François Ozon.

== Personal life ==
Pailhas is married to fellow actor Christopher Thompson and has two children. In 2003, she was the main presenter at the César Awards ceremony.

== Filmography ==
=== Cinema ===
Year	Title	Role	Director
1988	Three Seats for the 26th	Dancer	Jacques Demy
1991	Les arcandiers	Véronique	Manuel Sanchez
1991	La neige et le feu	Christiane Mercier	Claude Pinoteau
1992	IP5: L'île aux pachydermes	Gloria	Jean-Jacques Beineix
1993	Comment font les gens	Léa	Pascale Bailly
1994	Suite 16	Helen	Dominique Deruddere
1994	La folie douce	Louise	Frédéric Jardin
1995	Le Garçu	Sophie	Maurice Pialat
1995	Tom est tout seul	Hélène	Fabien Onteniente
1995	Don Juan DeMarco	Doña Ana	Jeremy Leven
1997	Les randonneurs	Nadine	Philippe Harel
1999	Peut-être	Lucie/Blandine	Cédric Klapisch
2000	La parenthèse enchantée	Marie	Michel Spinosa
2001	The Officers' Ward	Clémence	François Dupeyron
2002	The Adversary	Christine Faure	Nicole Garcia
2003	Après	Marie	Angelo Cianci
2003	The Cost of Living	Helena	Philippe Le Guay
2004	5x2	Valérie	François Ozon
2004	Les parallèles	Louise	Nicolas Saada
2004	They Came Back	Rachel	Robin Campillo
2004	Une vie à t'attendre	Claire	Thierry Klifa
2005	Sky Fighters	Maëlle Coste	Gérard Pirès
2006	Je pense à vous	Diane	Pascal Bonitzer
2006	Le héros de la famille	Marianne Bensalem	Thierry Klifa
2007	The Price to Pay	Caroline	Alexandra Leclère
2008	Didine	Alexandrine Langlois	Vincent Dietschy
2008	Les randonneurs à Saint-Tropez	Nadine	Philippe Harel
2009	Espion(s)	Claire	Nicolas Saada
2010	Bus Palladium	Prune Angelli	Christopher Thompson
2010	Rebecca H. (Return to the Dogs)	Rebecca Herry	Lodge Kerrigan
2011	Les yeux de sa mère	Maria Canalès	Thierry Klifa
2012	Le paradis des bêtes	Cathy Lenikart	Estelle Larrivaz
2013	Young & Beautiful	Sylvie	François Ozon
2013	Des gens qui s'embrassent	Herself	Danièle Thompson
2014	SMS	Stéphane	Gabriel Julien-Laferrière
2014	Divin Enfant	Pauline	Olivier Doran
2015	Disparue en hiver	Christine	Christophe Lamotte
2015	Portrait of the Artist	Célia Bhy	Antoine Barraud
2016	Night Song	Hannah Hermann	Raphaël Nadjari
2016	Louis-Ferdinand Céline	Lucette	Emmanuel Bourdieu
2016	The New Life of Paul Sneijder	Anna Sneijder	Thomas Vincent
2017	Le semeur	Marianne	Marine Francen
2021	Everything Went Fine	Pascale Bernheim	François Ozon
2022	The Butcher's Daughter	Charly Fleury	Christopher Thompson

=== Television ===
Year	Title	Role	Director	Notes
1988	Big Man	Blanche	Steno	TV series (1 episode)
1989	Haute tension	Maria	Jacques Ertaud	TV series (1 episode)
1989	David Lansky	Souad	Hervé Palud	TV series (1 episode)
1993	Un homme à la mer	Léna	Jacques Doillon	TV movie
2002	L'héritière	Juliette Destrac	Bernard Rapp	TV movie
2008	Château en Suède	Éléonore	Josée Dayan	TV movie
2011	Une nouvelle vie	Nathalie Vaillant	Christophe Lamotte	TV movie
2012	La disparition	Betty Gaillon	Jean-Xavier de Lestrade	TV movie
2013	La rupture	Marie-France Garaud	Laurent Heynemann	TV movie
2013	Le déclin de l'empire masculin	Camille	Angelo Cianci	TV movie
2016-18	Marseille	Rachel Taro	Florent-Emilio Siri, Thomas Gilou & Laïla Marrakchi	TV series (15 episodes)
2017	Capitaine Marleau	Clémence Dos Santos; Clara De Combelle	Josée Dayan	TV series (1 episode)
2019	La part du soupçon	Sophie Lancelle	Christophe Lamotte	TV movie
2021-22	UFOs	Élise Conti	Antony Cordier	TV series (24 episodes)
2023	Bardot	Anne-Marie Mucel	Danièle & Christopher Thompson	TV mini-series

== Awards and nominations ==
Year	Award	Nominated work	Result
1992	César Award for Most Promising Actress	La neige et le feu	Won
2004	César Award for Best Supporting Actress	The Cost of Living	Nominated
2014	César Award for Best Supporting Actress	Young & Beautiful	Nominated
