= Olivier Adam =

French author and screenwriter (born 1974)

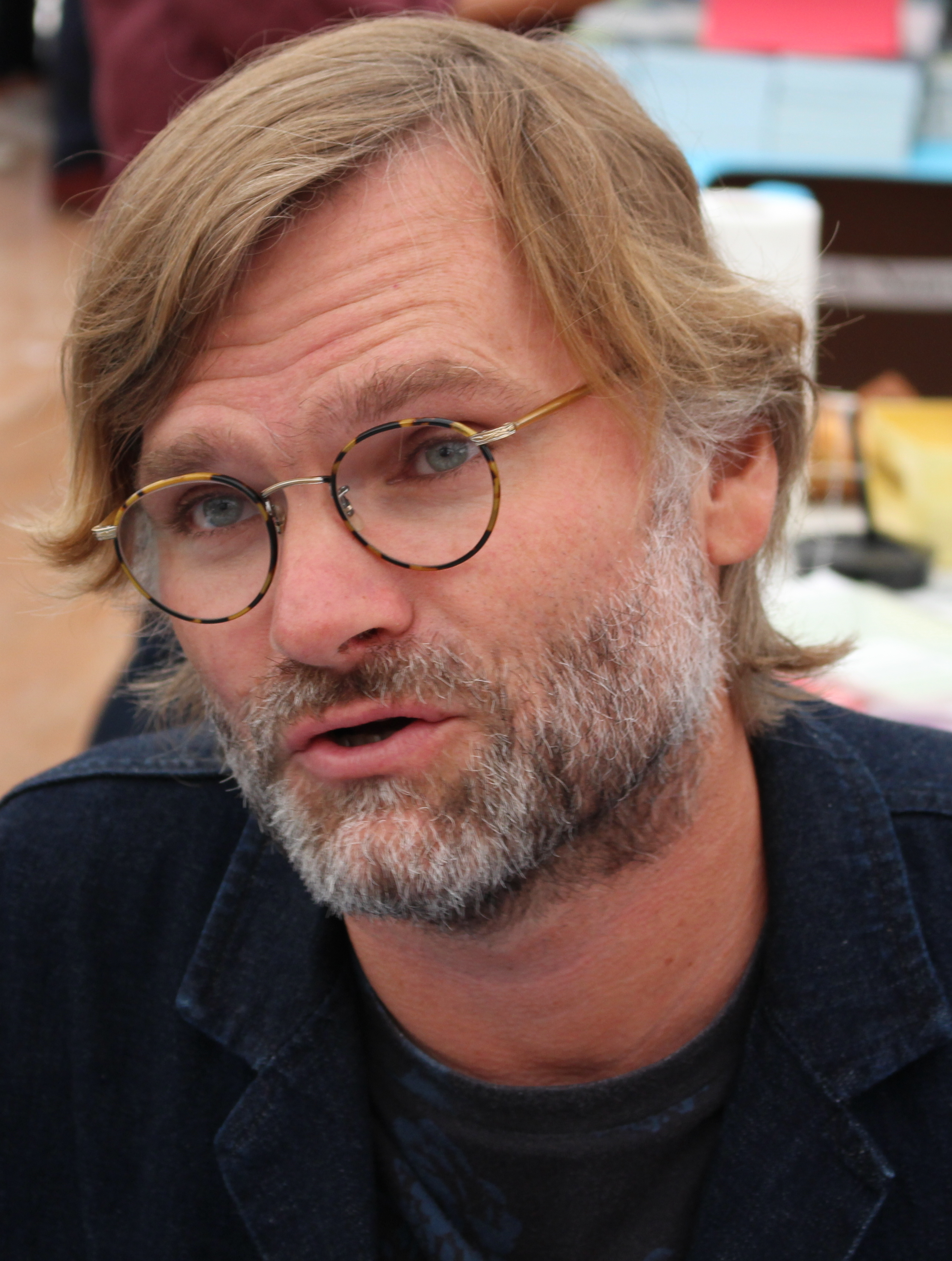
- Adam in 2018.
- Born: 12 July 1974 (age 52); Draveil, Essonne département, France
- Occupations: Author, screenwriter
- Years active: 2000–present

Olivier Adam (born 12 July 1974) is a French author and screenwriter. His debut novel Je vais bien, ne t’en fais pas ("Don't worry, I am fine") was adapted into the eponymous film. He also writes books for young adults, among them La messe anniversaire. Adam won the 2004 Prix Goncourt de la Nouvelle for Passer l'hiver.

He grew up in the Paris suburbs and now lives in Brittany, near Saint-Malo. He participated in the creation of the literary festival Correspondence Manosque. Also a screenwriter, he has participated in writing Don't Worry, I'm Fine (2006) and Welcome (2009).

== Biography ==
Olivier Adam was born on 12 July 1974 and grew up in the commune of Draveil with two brothers. His father was a bank clerk. Adam attended Paris Dauphine University, where he studied cultural business management. This was where he met his future partner Karine Reysset. He first became a consultant to advise local authorities in cultural policy and participated in the creation of the Correspondances de Manosque in 1999 with Olivier Chaudenson. He then briefly worked in publishing, where he was a collection director at the Éditions du Rouergue.

His first novel Je vais bien, ne t'en fais pas (I'm fine, don't worry), published in 2000, received critical acclaim. He was selected for the Festival du premier roman in 2001. From his third novel Poids léger (Lightweight) in 2002 and the purchase of the rights by Jean-Pierre Améris to make a future movie adaptation, which was released in 2004, he devoted himself entirely to writing. Following a meeting with Geneviève Brisac, he also wrote books for young people and led writing workshops in schools. In 2004, he won the Prix Goncourt de la nouvelle (Goncourt Short Story Prize) for his collection Passer l'hiver (Spend The Winter). In 2005, he left Paris to live in Saint-Malo, a town in Brittany, which he mentioned in Des vents contraires in 2009. He returned to the Paris region in 2014.

== Works ==
- 2000 : Je vais bien, ne t'en fais pas, Le Dilettante.
- 2001 : À l'Ouest, Éditions de l'Olivier.
- 2002 : Poids léger, Éditions de l'Olivier.
- 2004 : Douanes, nouvelle parue dans le cadre de Lille 2004 Capitale européenne de la culture.
- 2004 : Passer l'hiver (short stories), Éditions de l'Olivier.
- 2004 : Sous la pluie, L'École des loisirs.
- 2005 : Falaises, Éditions de l'Olivier.
- 2007 : À l'abri de rien, Éditions de l'Olivier.
- 2009 : Des vents contraires, Éditions de l'Olivier. (ISBN 978-2-87929-646-3).
- 2010 : Le Cœur régulier, Éditions de l'Olivier. (ISBN 978-2-87929-746-0).
- 2010 : Kyoto Limited Express, with Arnaud Auzouy, Éditions de l'Olivier.
- 2012 : Les Lisières, Flammarion. (ISBN 978-2-290-06848-9)
- 2014 : Peine perdue, Flammarion. (ISBN 978-2-08-131421-4)
- 2016 : La Renverse, Flammarion. (ISBN 978-2-08-137595-6)
  - 2018 : Chanson de la ville silencieuse, Flammarion. ISBN 978-2-08-142203-2
  - 2019 : Une partie de badminton, Flammarion
  - 2020 : Tout peut s'oublier, Flammarion. ISBN 978-2-08-023386-8
  - 2022 : Dessous les roses, Flammarion, 248 pp. ISBN 978-2-298-18129-6
  - 2023 : Personne n'a besoin de savoir, Editions Bruno Doucey

=== Works for youth ===
- 2000 : On ira voir la mer, L'École des loisirs, collection « Médium »
- 2003 : La Messe anniversaire, L'École des loisirs, collection « Médium »
- 2004 : Sous la pluie, L'École des loisirs, collection « Médium »
- 2005 : Comme les doigts de la main, L'École des loisirs, collection « Médium »
- 2005 : Le jour où j'ai cassé le château de Chambord, L'École des loisirs, collection « Mouche », illustré par Bonniol
- 2006 : La Cinquième saison, collectif, L'École des loisirs, collection « Médium »
- 2009 : Ni vu ni connu, L'École des loisirs, collection « Neuf »
- 2010 : Les Boulzoreilles, with Euriel Dumait, Seuil Jeunesse
- 2010 : Un océan dans la baignoire, with Françoiz Breut, Actes Sud Junior
- 2011 : Personne ne bouge, éditions École des loisirs, collection Neuf
- 2011 : Achile et la rivière, with Ilya Green, Actes Sud Junior

== Awards ==
- 2004 : Prix Goncourt de la nouvelle for Passer l'hiver.
- 2006 : Lauréat de la Villa Kujoyama.
- 2007 : Lauréat du Prix Roman France Télévisions pour À l'abri de rien.
- 2007 : Prix du roman populiste for À l'abri de rien.
- 2007 : Prix du Amila Meckert for À l'abri de rien.
- 2007 : Étoile d'or du scénariste for the film Don't Worry, I'm Fine
- 2007 : Meilleur scénario au Festival de la fiction TV de La Rochelle pour Maman est folle
- 2009 : Lauréat du prix RTL-Lire for Des vents contraires
- 2010 : Prix Jacques Prévert du Scénario for the film Welcome

== Screen adaptations ==
Poids Léger was adapted into the film Lightweight by Jean-Pierre Améris, with Nicolas Duvauchelle and Bernard Campan in the lead roles.

À l'abri de rien was adapted for television (Maman est folle) with Isabelle Carré in the lead role.

Je vais bien, ne t'en fais pas was adapted into the film Don't Worry, I'm Fine directed by Philippe Lioret in 2006. Kad Merad and Mélanie Laurent played the lead roles. The film was nominated for a César in several categories, including Best Adapted Screenplay. Kad Merad won the Cesar for best supporting actor and Mélanie Laurent for Most Promising Actress.

Des vents contraires was adapted into a film of the same name in 2011, starring Audrey Tautou.

The short story "Nouvel An", from the collection Passer l'hiver, was adapted into the film Passer l'hiver directed by Aurélia Barbet.

Le Cœur régulier was adapted into a film in 2016, with Vanja d'Alcantara directing and Isabelle Carré starring.
