= Avenue Montaigne (film) =

- Directed by: Danièle Thompson
- Written by: Christopher Thompson; Danièle Thompson
- Produced by: Christine Gozlan
- Starring: Cécile de France; Valérie Lemercier; Albert Dupontel; Claude Brasseur; Dani; Christopher Thompson
- Cinematography: Jean-Marc Fabre
- Edited by: Sylvie Landra
- Music by: Nicola Piovani
- Distributed by: Mars Distribution
- Release dates: 21 January 2006 (L'Alpe-d'Huez Film Festival); 15 February 2006 (France)
- Running time: 106 minutes
- Country: France
- Language: French
- Budget: $9 million
- Box office: $17.6 million

Fauteuils d'orchestre (literal translation, Orchestra Seats) is a French film released in 2006 directed by Danièle Thompson, which she co-scripted with her son, Christopher Thompson. The film was released in the United Kingdom and Australia as Orchestra Seats, and in the United States and English-speaking Canada as Avenue Montaigne.

Avenue Montaigne had been selected as the French entry for the Best Foreign Language Oscar for the 79th Academy Awards, making the January shortlist.

== Production ==
Valérie Lemercier was awarded a César Award for Best Actress in a Supporting Role for her performance. The movie was nominated for another four Césars and also received a shortlist nomination for an Academy Award for Best Foreign Film. The film is dedicated to Suzanne Flon (Madame Roux in the cast), who died after the film was completed.

== Cast ==
- Cécile de France – Jessica
- Valérie Lemercier – Catherine Versen
- Albert Dupontel – Jean-François Lefort
- Claude Brasseur – Jacques Grumberg
- Dani – Claudie
- Christopher Thompson – Frédéric Grumberg
- Laura Morante – Valentine Lefort
- Annelise Hesme – Valérie
- Sydney Pollack – Brian Sobinski
- Françoise Lépine – Magali Garrel
- Guillaume Gallienne – Pascal
- Suzanne Flon – Madame Roux
- Michel Vuillermoz – Félix
- Sabrina Ouazani – Rachida
- François Rollin – Marcel
- Daniel Benoin – Daniel Bercoff
- Christian Hecq – Grégoire Bergonhe
- Julia Molkhou – Margot
- Laurent Mouton – Serge
- Marc Rioufol – Claude Mercier

== Plot ==
Jessica has moved from her small Burgundian town of Mâcon to Paris to start a new life, inspired by her grandmother, Madame Roux, who "always loved luxury". In Paris, she initially has trouble finding work, and spends one evening without shelter. She eventually gets a job waitressing in a small café, the Bar des Théâtres, even though the café, following tradition, has never before hired female waiters. The owner hires Jessica only because he is expecting large crowds soon and needs staff. The café is in an area of Paris close to several artistic venues, including the Théâtre des Champs-Élysées and a concert hall, on Avenue Montaigne. One of the backstage staff at the theatre, Claudie, helps to welcome Jessica to Paris. While working at the café, Jessica meets a number of people who are all dealing with various life crises or changes:

- Catherine is an actress who has been typecast by her role in a popular TV soap opera and who yearns to do more artistically rewarding work. She is alternating between her TV soap opera and a production of a Georges Feydeau play, rarely getting time for sleep except in taxicabs. A new opportunity arises when the American film director Brian Sobinski arrives in Paris to cast a new film based on the life of Simone de Beauvoir.
- Jean-François is a world-renowned pianist who wants nothing more than to share his playing with those who would appreciate it least, and to get away from formal classical music concerts. This disconcerts his wife Valentine, who is also his manager, because of all the planning that she has done for his career.
- Jacques is an art collector who has decided to sell off his collection towards the end of his life. He and his son Frédéric have a somewhat strained relationship, not helped by the fact that Jacques is in a relationship with the much younger Valérie, with whom Frédéric himself once had an affair. Frédéric is also just separated from his wife.

All three face pivotal turning points in their lives on the same night, with Jessica as a thread between all three.

== Classical music reference ==
The French pianist François-René Duchâble was the classical music technical advisor for the film, and performs the solo piano works for the soundtrack. The character of Jean-François Lefort in this film incorporates elements of Duchâble's own expressed attitudes towards the classical music world. In the film, Jean-François states his dislike for the stresses and formality of the classical music world, and wants to perform concerts for children and the ill. This is reflected from public statements that Duchâble had made in previous years.

== Reception ==
Avenue Montaigne has an approval rating of 74% on review aggregator website Rotten Tomatoes, based on 99 reviews, and an average rating of 6.5/10. The website's critical consensus states: "A cute and bubbly French comedy that carries no deeper lessons or agendas than to have a little fun for 90 minutes". Metacritic assigned the film a weighted average score of 64 out of 100, based on 25 critics, indicating "generally favourable reviews".

== See also ==
- List of submissions to the 79th Academy Awards for Best Foreign Language Film
- List of French submissions for the Academy Award for Best Foreign Language Film
