= Christopher Thompson (actor) =

French actor, screenwriter and film director (born 1966)

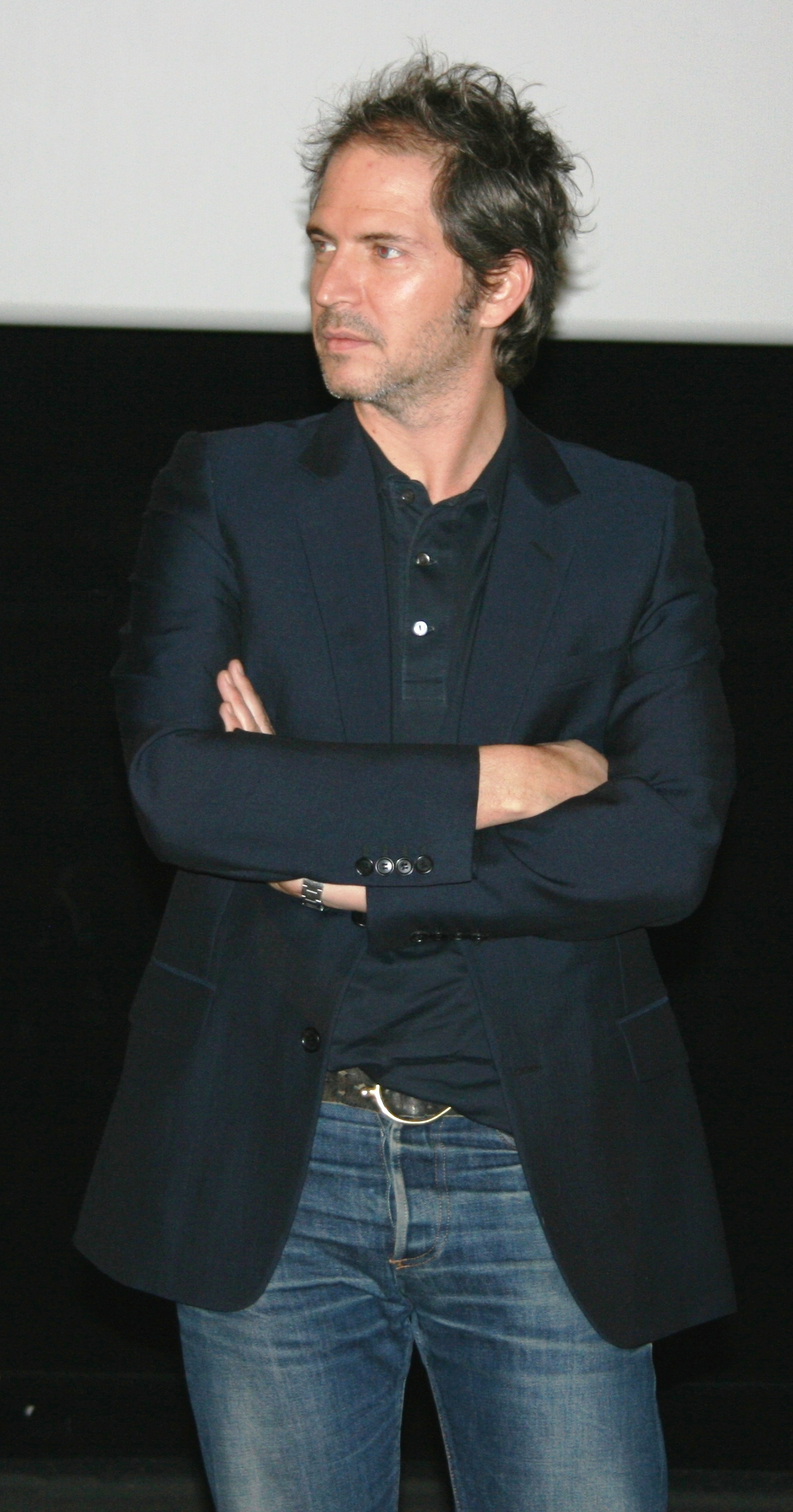
- Born: 13 August 1966 (age 60); New York City, U.S.
- Occupation: Actor
- Spouse: Géraldine Pailhas
- Children: 2

Christopher Thompson (born 13 August 1966) is a French actor, screenwriter, and film director.

== Early life ==
Thompson comes from a family deeply associated with theatrical arts. He is the son of film director and screenwriter Danièle Thompson and the American financier Richard Thompson, and his maternal grandfather is director Gérard Oury (1919–2006); his sister is the actress Caroline Thompson. He is married to actress Géraldine Pailhas. They have two children.

Born in New York City in 1966, Thompson was raised in his mother's home country, France. Later he returned to the United States to attend Brown University.

== Career ==
=== Actor ===
As an actor, Thompson's first major screen role was his portrayal of the revolutionary leader Saint-Just in La Révolution française (1989), a French television epic produced for the bicentennial of the French Revolution. His principal screen credits are in French productions, including the films L'Atlantide (1992) and Giorgino (1994), and the television miniseries The Count of Monte Cristo (1998). His credits in English-language productions include supporting roles in Jefferson in Paris (1995) and The Luzhin Defence (2001).

=== Screenwriter ===
Thompson collaborated with his mother on the screenplay of her first feature-length film, La Bûche (aka Season's Beatings, 1999). The two worked together again on the script of Decalage horaire (aka Jet Lag, 2001), and their script for Fauteuils d'orchestre (aka Orchestra Seats or Avenue Montaigne, 2006) was a nominee in the category of Best Original Screenplay at the César Awards. A later collaboration, the comedy Change of Plans, was released in 2009.

=== Director ===
- 2010 Thompson made his debut as a director with a film he also scripted, Bus Palladium, starring Marc-André Grondin.
- 2021 The Butcher's Daughter (Tendre et saignant)
- 2023 Bardot, co-directed with Danièle Thompson
