= Jean Dell =

French actor and writer (born 1961)

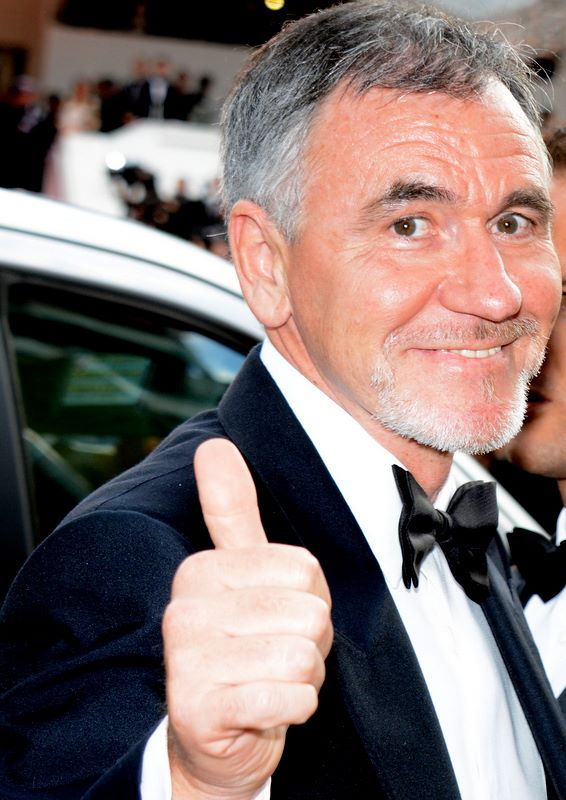
- Jean Dell at the 2014 Cannes Film Festival
- Born: 17 March 1961 (age 65); Saint-Étienne, Loire, France
- Occupations: Actor, Writer
- Years active: 1987—present
- Spouse: Christiane Bopp

Jean Dell (born 17 March 1961) is a French actor and writer.

== Career ==
After starting out in radio, he turned to the stage, film and television, where he will create and perform several sketches of the show Les Grosses Têtes. He also participated in the show La Classe, where he met his wife, Christiane Bopp.

== Theatre ==
Year	Title	Author	Director	Notes
1995	Le Portefeuille	Pierre Sauvil & Éric Assous	Jean-Luc Moreau	
1995	Sacré Nostradamus !	Jean Dell	Gérard Caillaud	
2000	Le Béret de la tortue	Jean Dell & Gérald Sibleyras	Etienne de Balasy	
2003	Un petit jeu sans conséquence	Jean Dell & Gérald Sibleyras	Stéphane Hillel	Nominated - Molière Award for Best Playwright
2004	L'Inscription	Jean Dell & Gérald Sibleyras	Jacques Échantillon	
2005	Une Heure et demie de retard	Jean Dell & Gérald Sibleyras	Bernard Murat	
2006	Vive Bouchon	Jean Dell & Gérald Sibleyras	Jean-Luc Moreau	
2012	Un stylo dans la tête	Jean Dell	Jean-Luc Moreau	

== Filmography ==
=== Actor ===
Year	Title	Role	Director	Notes
1987	Hateman	Large Marge	Harry Hope	
1989-94	Tribunal	The bailiff	Dominique Masson, Jean-Pierre Prévost, ...	TV series (82 episodes)
1990	Counterstrike		Paolo Barzman	TV series (1 episode)
1990	Haute tension	The photograph	Danièle J. Suissa	TV series (1 episode)
1991	Steak Barbare	The CEO	Jean-Walter Muller	Short
1991	Les ritals		Marcel Bluwal	TV movie
1991	The Hitchhiker	Thug	Patricia Mazuy	TV series (1 episode)
1992	Interdit d'amour		Catherine Corsini	TV movie
1996-97	Jamais 2 sans toi	Doctor Aleski	Dominique Masson	TV series (3 episodes)
1997	Un impossible amour	The ray head	Michaëla Watteaux	TV movie
1997	Un printemps de chien	The publisher	Alain Tasma	TV movie
1998	Une grosse bouchée d'amour	The lawyer	Michaëla Watteaux	TV movie
1998	Nestor Burma	The concierge	Philippe Niang	TV series (1 episode)
1998	Sous le soleil	Lawyer Belgrand	Philippe Roussel	TV series (2 episodes)
1999	Le schpountz	The journalist	Gérard Oury	
1999	Joséphine, ange gardien	The customs officer	Pierre Joassin	TV series (1 episode)
2000	Épouse-moi	François	Harriet Marin	
2000	La vache et le président	The cop	Philippe Muyl	
2000	Anibal	Didier	Pierre Boutron	TV movie
2000	Joséphine, ange gardien	The veterinarian	Philippe Monnier	TV series (1 episode)
2000	H		Charles Nemes	TV series (1 episode)
2000	Un et un font six	The mayor	Jean-Pierre Vergne	TV series (1 episode)
2000-14	Le juge est une femme	Edouard Lemonnier	René Manzor, Pierre Boutron, ...	TV series (46 episodes)
2001	A Crime in Paradise	Judge Frégard	Jean Becker	
2001	Les Rois mages	The receptionist	Didier Bourdon & Bernard Campan	
2001	J'ai faim !!!	Barnabé's client	Florence Quentin	
2001	Un coeur oublié	Delaplace	Philippe Monnier	TV movie
2001	Le regard de l'autre	The cop	Dominique Tabuteau	TV movie
2001	Sophie Rousseau, la vie avant tout	Doctor Langlade	Alain Tasma	TV movie
2001	Une fille dans l'azur	Valère	Jean-Pierre Vergne	TV movie
2001	Rastignac ou les ambitieux	Labri	Alain Tasma	TV mini-series
2001	Une femme d'honneur	Lafargue	Philippe Monnier	TV series (1 episode)
2002	Quelqu'un de bien	The receptionist	Patrick Timsit	
2002	Une Ferrari pour deux	The biker	Charlotte Brandström	TV movie
2002	Un paradis pour deux	The head of service	Pierre Sisser	TV movie
2002	Napoléon	Malmaison's player	Yves Simoneau	TV mini-series
2002	Joséphine, ange gardien	Doctor Bolbec	Laurent Dussaux	TV series (1 episode)
2002	Commissariat Bastille		Jean-Marc Seban	TV series (1 episode)
2002	Fred et son orchestre	The school inspector	Michaëla Watteaux	TV series (1 episode)
2002-05	Avocats & associés	General Lawyer Cuq	Alexandre Pidoux, Christophe Lamotte, ...	TV series (4 episodes)
2003	Ruby & Quentin	The radiologist	Francis Veber	
2003	Who Killed Bambi ?	The otorhinolaryngology	Gilles Marchand	
2003	Je reste !	Carcassonne	Diane Kurys	
2003	Silver moumoute	Jacky	Christophe Campos	Short
2003	Un bébé noir dans un couffin blanc	Doctor Moreau	Laurent Dussaux	TV movie
2003	L'affaire Dominici	Lawyer Rozan	Pierre Boutron	TV movie
2003	La deuxième vérité	Prosecutor Lurs	Philippe Monnier	TV movie
2003	Mata Hari, la vraie histoire	The Marquis of Margerie	Alain Tasma	TV movie
2003	Le Bleu de l'océan	Professor Chaney	Didier Albert	TV mini-series
2003	Arzak Rhapsody	Unicorns	Jean Giraud	TV mini-series
2003	Les enquêtes d'Éloïse Rome	Londonne	Vincent Monnet	TV series (1 episode)
2003	Père et maire	The banker	Philippe Monnier	TV series (1 episode)
2004	The Story of My Life	Raphaël's father	Laurent Tirard	
2004	San Antonio	The journalist	Frédéric Auburtin	
2004	L'insaisissable		Élisabeth Rappeneau	TV movie
2004	Le voyageur sans bagage	The hotel manager	Pierre Boutron	TV movie
2004	Julie Lescaut	Bellegarde	Alain Wermus	TV series (1 episode)
2004	Joséphine, ange gardien	Brother Mathieu	Patrick Malakian	TV series (1 episode)
2004	La crim'	Belmonta	Dominique Guillo	TV series (1 episode)
2004-06	Léa Parker	Barrault	Bruno Gantillon, Robin Davis, ...	TV series (10 episodes)
2005	How Much Do You Love Me?	Cemetery Man	Bertrand Blier	
2005	It's Our Life!	The priest	Gérard Krawczyk	
2005	The Demon Stirs	The mayor	Marie-Pascale Osterrieth	
2005	La visite	Michel Séguier	Pierre Sisser	TV movie
2005	Désiré Landru	The president	Pierre Boutron	TV movie
2005	Le temps meurtrier	Warrant Thomassin	Philippe Monnier	TV movie
2005	2013, la fin du pétrole		Stéphane Meunier	TV movie
2005	Famille d'accueil	Vincent	Bruno Bontzolakis	TV series (1 episode)
2005	Les Cordier, juge et flic	The seller	Paul Planchon	TV series (1 episode)
2006	The Pink Panther	Justice Minister Clochard	Shawn Levy	
2006	La Maison du Bonheur	The notary	Dany Boon	
2006	Capitaine Casta	Leblanc	Joyce Buñuel	TV movie
2006	Du goût et des couleurs	Antonio Marchetti	Michaëla Watteaux	TV movie
2006	La volière aux enfants	Monsieur Chaumar	Olivier Guignard	TV movie
2006	Le Grand Charles	Pierre Billotte	Bernard Stora	TV mini-series
2006	Central nuit	Dumas	Serge De Closets	TV series (1 episode)
2006	Homicides	Duverger	Christophe Barraud	TV series (1 episode)
2007	Danse avec lui	Daniel	Valérie Guignabodet	
2007	Coupable	Fotorino	Philippe Monnier	TV movie
2007	Suspectes	The waiter	Laurent Dussaux	TV mini-series
2007	Confidences	The psychiatrist	Laurent Dussaux	TV mini-series
2007	Joséphine, ange gardien	Hugues de Bouailles	Philippe Monnier	TV series (1 episode)
2007	Chez Maupassant	The doctor	Jacques Santamaria	TV series (1 episode)
2007	Louis la brocante	Jean-Claude	Michel Favart	TV series (1 episode)
2007	Boulevard du Palais	Gérard Falsetta	Pascale Dallet	TV series (1 episode)
2008	French Film	Alain	Jackie Oudney	
2008	Love Me No More	Mortez	Jean Becker	
2008	Sa raison d'être	Michel	Renaud Bertrand	TV movie
2008	Braquage en famille	The manager	Pierre Boutron	TV movie
2009	Le missionnaire	The police captain	Roger Delattre	
2009	La reine et le cardinal	Don Pimentel	Marc Rivière	TV movie
2009	R.I.S, police scientifique	Lawyer Langevin	Éric Le Roux	TV series (1 episode)
2009	Adresse inconnue	Daniel Devillard	Alain Wermus	TV series (1 episode)
2009-15	Mes amis, mes amours, mes emmerdes	Verny	Jérôme Navarro, Sylvie Ayme, ...	TV series (19 episodes)
2010	The Clink of Ice	The oncologist	Bertrand Blier	
2010	C'est toi c'est tout	Antoine	Jacques Santamaria	TV movie
2010–present	Clem	Michel Brimont	Joyce Buñuel, Arnauld Mercadier, ...	TV series (22 episodes)
2011	Pour Djamila	Edmond Michelet	Caroline Huppert	TV movie
2012	Camping paradis	Paul	Bruno Garcia	TV series (1 episode)
2014	Grace of Monaco	Denard	Olivier Dahan	
2014	Borderline	Samuel Bergson	Olivier Marchal	TV movie
2014	Richelieu, la pourpre et le sang	Count of Chavigny	Henri Helman	TV movie
2015	Mongeville	Jean-Charles Peyroux Conti	Bruno Garcia	TV series (1 episode)
2016	La Dream Team	The PDG President	Thomas Sorriaux	
2016	Cherif	Léonard Wermeer	Julien Zidi	TV series (1 episode)
2017	L'ascension	Business Man	Ludovic Bernard	

=== Writer ===
Year	Title	Director	Notes
2001	Un gars, une fille	Guy A. Lepage & Sylvain Roy	TV series (2 episodes)
2004	Un petit jeu sans conséquence	Bernard Rapp	
2009	King Guillaume	Pierre-François Martin-Laval	
2011	Bienvenue à Bouchon	Luc Béraud	TV movie
2011	Victor Sauvage	Alain Choquart	TV series (1 episode)
