= Daniel Russo =

French film actor, comedian and director (born 1948)

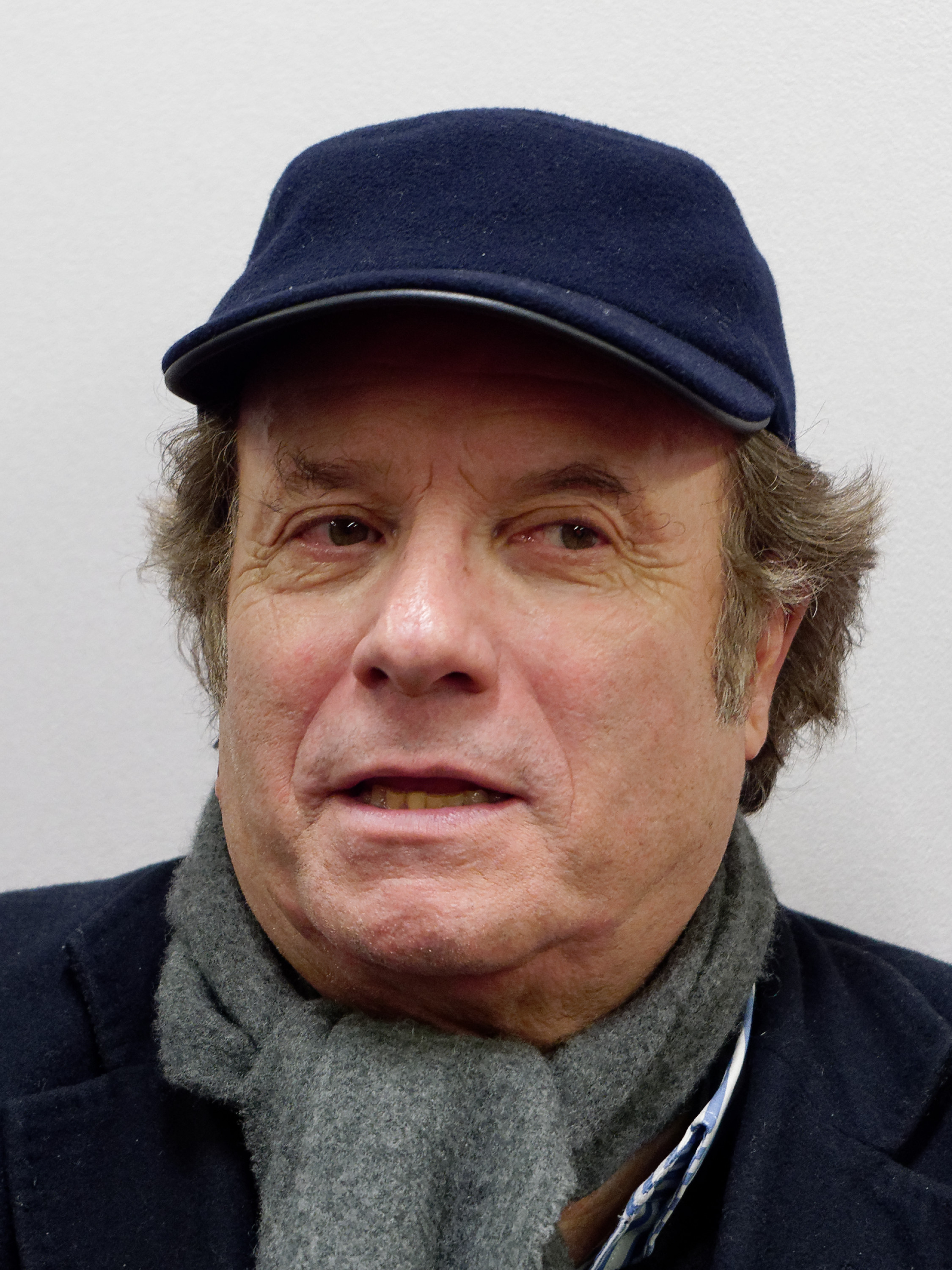
- Born: Paris, France
- Occupations: Actor, comedian, director
- Years active: 1973–present
- Partner: Lucie Russo (m. 1975)
- Children: 2

Daniel Russo is a French film actor, comedian and director.

== Theater ==
Year	Title	Author	Director	Notes
1973	Le Paysan parvenu	Pierre de Marivaux (adaptation by Albert Husson)	Jean Meyer	
1974	Of Mice and Men	John Steinbeck	Daniel Russo	
1974	La Bande à Glouton	Jacques Fabbri & André Gillois	Jacques Fabbri	
1980	Sexual Perversity in Chicago	David Mamet	Nikolaï Arutène	
1981	Le Jardin d'Eponine	Maria Pacôme	Gérard Vergez	
1984	Des Promesses toujours des promesses	S. Boldrick	S. Boldrick	
1986	La fille sur la banquette arrière	L. Spade	Pierre Mondy	
1992	Le grand jeu	Daniel Colas	Daniel Colas	
1993	Partenaires	David Mamet	Bernard Stora	
1994	Tromper n'est pas jouer	Daniel Colas	Daniel Colas (2)	
1999	Espèces Menacées	Ray Cooney	Éric Civanyan	
2001–04	Sexe, magouilles et culture générale	Laurent Baffie	Laurent Baffie	
2005–08	Toc toc	Laurent Baffie	Laurent Baffie (2)	
2009	Les Autres	Jean-Claude Grumberg	Daniel Colas (3)	Nominated - Molière Award for Best Actor
2011–12	Hollywood	Ron Hutchinson	Daniel Colas (4)	
2013-14	Hier est un autre jour !	Sylvain Meyniac & Jean-François Cros	Éric Civanyan (2)	
2015	Sans rancune	Sam Bobrick & Ron Clark	Sébastien Azzopardi	
2015	L'être ou pas (Pour en finir avec la question juive)	Jean-Claude Grumberg	Charles Tordjman	

== Filmography ==
Year	Title	Role	Director	Notes
1974	Les dossiers du professeur Morgan		Jacques Audoir, Jean-Paul Carrère & Guy Jorré	TV series (1 episode)
1976	The Judge and the Assassin	Guardian	Bertrand Tavernier	
1976	La bande à Glouton	Lassouche	François Chatel	TV movie
1976	Contrefaçons	Michel Navro	Abder Isker	TV movie
1976	Mado	Roger	Claude Sautet	
1977	Jullie était belle	Michel	Jacques-René Saurel	
1977	Moi, fleur bleue	Commercial's director	Eric Le Hung	
1977	Les rebelles		Pierre Badel	TV movie
1978	L'exercice du pouvoir		Philippe Galland	
1979	Ciao, les mecs	Mario	Sergio Gobbi	
1979	Le mors aux dents	TV commentator	Laurent Heynemann	
1979	Cinéma 16	Jean	Gérard Chouchan	TV series (1 episode)
1980	Tout dépend des filles...	Soif d'Aujourd'hui	Pierre Fabre	
1980	La fortune des Rougon	Antoine Macquart	Yves-André Hubert	TV mini-series
1980	Histoires étranges	Jean-François	Peter Kassovitz	TV mini-series
1980	La traque	Denis	Philippe Lefebvre	TV movie
1980	Cinéma 16	Bernard	Eric Le Hung (2)	TV series (1 episode)
1981	Pourquoi pas nous?	Guy Loiseau	Michel Berny	
1981	Putain d'histoire d'amour		Gilles Béhat	
1981	Cinéma 16	The assistant	Daniel Martineau	TV series (1 episode)
1982	Caméra une première	Daniel Grandchamp	Peter Kassovitz (2)	TV series (1 episode)
1982	Les grands ducs	Pascal	Marcel Bozzuffi & Patrick Jamain	TV movie
1982	La Boum 2	Etienne	Claude Pinoteau	
1983	Un homme à ma taille	André	Annette Carducci	
1983	Ça va pas être triste	Charles Murat	Pierre Sisser	
1983	Le jeune marié	Durbec	Bernard Stora	
1983	Pablo est mort		Philippe Lefebvre (2)	TV movie
1983	Cinéma 16	Nançay	Daniel Martineau (2)	TV series (1 episode)
1984	Paris vu par... vingt ans après		Bernard Dubois	
1984	Cinéma 16	Paul	Bernard Dubois (2)	TV series (1 episode)
1985	Sac de noeuds	André Martin	Josiane Balasko	
1985	Moi vouloir toi	Pierrot Baillet	Patrick Dewolf	
1986	Julien Fontanes, magistrat	Antoine Gissac	Jean-Pierre Decourt	TV series (1 episode)
1986	Black Mic Mac	Rabuteau	Thomas Gilou	
1986	Les Frères Pétard	Harky	Hervé Palud	
1987	Killing Time	Melchior	Édouard Niermans	
1988	Mangeuses d'Hommes	American driver	Daniel Colas	
1989	Life and Nothing But	Lieutenant Trévise	Bertrand Tavernier (2)	
1989-93	Commissaire Moulin	Shalom	Paul Planchon, Yves Rénier & Nicolas Ribowski	TV series (4 episodes)
1990-92	Sophie et Virginie	Father	Bernard Deyriès & Pascal Morelli	TV series (6 episodes)
1991	Génial, mes parents divorcent!	Christian's father	Patrick Braoudé	
1991	Les gens ne sont pas forcément ignobles	Leplomb	Bernard Murat	TV movie
1991	La grande dune	Touchaye	Bernard Stora (2)	TV movie
1992	Condamné au silence	Romain	Roger Andrieux	TV movie
1993	Drôles d'oiseaux	Hosser	Peter Kassovitz (3)	
1994	Neuf mois	Georges	Patrick Braoudé (2)	Nominated - César Award for Best Supporting Actor
1994	L'homme de mes rêves	Alex	Georges Lautner	TV movie
1995	The Bait	Jean-Pierre	Bertrand Tavernier (3)	
1995	The Horseman on the Roof	Master Rigoard	Jean-Paul Rappeneau	
1995	Happiness Is in the Field	André	Étienne Chatiliez	
1996	Ma femme me quitte	Alain	Didier Kaminka	
1996	Mémoires d'un jeune con	Damien	Patrick Aurignac	
1996	Fantôme avec chauffeur	Marcel Bourdon	Gérard Oury	
1996	Delphine 1, Yvan 0	Monsieur Hattus	Dominique Farrugia	
1996	Oui	Polo	Alexandre Jardin	
1996	Nous sommes tous des anges	The station's man	Simon Lelouch	Short
1997	Maintenant ou jamais	Raymond	Jérôme Foulon	TV movie
1997	La cible	Jean-Pierre Bellac	Pierre Courrège	
1997	L'Homme idéal	Paul	Xavier Gélin	
1997	Le garçon d'orage	Marcellin	Jérôme Foulon (2)	TV movie
1997	Droit dans le mur	Jean-François	Pierre Richard	
1997	Abus de méfiance	The husband	Pascal Légitimus	Short
1998	(G)rève party	Monsieur Jean	Fabien Onteniente	
1998	Le Dîner de Cons	Pascal Meneaux	Francis Veber	
1998	Maintenant et pour toujours	Loïc	Joël Santoni & Daniel Vigne	TV movie
1998	Bingo!	André	Maurice Illouz	
1998	Les Boys II	Laurent	Louis Saia	
1999	Ouriga	François	Antoine Plantevin	TV movie
2000	Un homme en colère	Daniel Loussine	Élisabeth Rappeneau	TV series (1 episode)
2000	Route de nuit	Guido	Laurent Dussaux	TV movie
2000	Deuxième vie	Ronny	Patrick Braoudé (3)	
2000	Antilles sur Seine	Nervous cop	Pascal Légitimus (2)	
2001	L'aîné des Ferchaux	Franck	Bernard Stora (3)	TV movie
2002	Infraction	The cop	Christian Vandelet	Short
2002	Une maison dans la tempête	Tony	Christiane Lehérissey	TV movie
2002	Marche et rêve! Les homards de l'utopie	Toinou	Paul Carpita	
2002	À l'abri des regards indiscrets	Business man	Ruben Alves & Hugo Gélin	Short
2002	La vie devant nous	Daniel	Vincenzo Marano	TV series (14 episodes)
2003	À cran	Bob François	Alain Tasma	TV movie
2003	The Car Keys	Daniel	Laurent Baffie	
2004	Suzie Berton	Marco	Bernard Stora (4)	TV movie
2004	Du côté de chez Marcel	Aldo	Dominique Ladoge	TV movie
2004	Nuit noire	Bernard	Daniel Colas (2)	
2004	Le juge est une femme	Duval	Patrick Poubel	TV series (1 episode)
2004	Louis Page	Francis Mercier	Philippe Roussel	TV series (1 episode)
2004	À cran, deux ans après	Bob François	Alain Tasma (2)	TV movie
2004	Si c'est ça la famille	Daniel Colona	Peter Kassovitz (4)	TV movie
2004	93, rue Lauriston	Henri Lafont	Denys Granier-Deferre	TV movie
2004-06	Trois pères à la maison	Tony	Stéphane Kappes	TV series (3 episodes)
2005	Iznogoud	Narrator	Patrick Braoudé (4)	
2005	Bien dégagé derrière les oreilles	Henri Castarède	Anne Deluz	TV movie
2005	La crim'	Simonin	Denis Amar	TV series (1 episode)
2005	L'antidote	Guillaume Marty	Vincent De Brus	
2005	Le meilleur commerce du monde	Ricco	Bruno Gantillon	TV movie
2005	Sexe, magouilles et culture générale		Laurent Baffie (2)	TV movie
2005	L'homme qui voulait passer à la télé	Bernard's father	Amar Arhab & Fabrice Michelin	TV movie
2005	Joséphine, ange gardien	Victor	Jean-Marc Seban	TV series (1 episode)
2005	On ne prête qu'aux riches	Lucien	Arnaud Sélignac	TV movie
2006	Le temps de la désobéissance	Edouard Vigne	Patrick Volson	TV movie
2006	Le doux pays de mon enfance	Roger Joly	Jacques Renard	TV movie Biarritz International Festival of Audiovisual Programming - Best Actor
2008	C'est mieux la vie quand on est grand	Raymond	Luc Béraud	TV movie
2008	La veuve tatouée	Louis	Virginie Sauveur	TV movie
2008	TOC TOC	Vincent	Laurent Baffie (3)	TV movie
2009	La vie est à nous	Marion's father	Laura Muscardin	TV series (1 episode)
2009	Mac Orlan	Commander Mac Orlan	Patrick Poubel (2)	TV series (4 episodes)
2009	Un homme d'honneur'	Pierre Bérégovoy	Laurent Heynemann (2)	TV movie
2009	La passion selon Didier	Didier	Lorenzo Gabriele	TV movie
2009	Enquêtes réservées	Judge Breitman	Bruno Garcia	TV series (1 episode)
2009	Un viol	Maxime Gallet	Marion Sarraut	TV movie
2009	La liste	Paul Sax	Christian Faure	TV movie
2009	Myster Mocky présente	Roger	Jean-Pierre Mocky	TV series (1 episode)
2010	Au siècle de Maupassant	The Marquis of Amblezy	Laurent Heynemann (3)	TV series (1 episode)
2010	Les toqués	Louis de Brecourt	Laurence Katrian	TV series (1 episode)
2011	Chez Maupassant	Cornudet	Philippe Bérenger	TV series (1 episode)
2011	Changer la vie!	Pierre Bérégovoy	Serge Moati	TV movie
2011	J'ai peur d'oublier	Paul	Élisabeth Rappeneau (2)	TV movie Nominated - Monte-Carlo Television Festival - Best Performance by an Actor
2011	Midi et soir	Jean-Michel	Laurent Firode	TV movie
2012	La guerre du Royal Palace	Maxime Verdier	Claude-Michel Rome	TV movie
2013	Il faut marier maman	Gérard	Jérôme Navarro	TV movie
2013	Marius	Escartefigue	Daniel Auteuil	
2013	Fanny	Escartefigue	Daniel Auteuil (2)	
2013	Les François	Old François	Jérôme Foulon (3)	TV movie
2013	VDM		Fouad Benhammou	TV series (1 episode)
2013	Myster Mocky présente	Roger	Jean-Pierre Mocky	TV series (1 episode)
2014	Les Trois Frères, le retour	Michael's Stepfather	Les Inconnus	
2014	Caïn	Yves Pasteur	Benoît d'Aubert	TV series (1 episode)
2014	Les tourtereaux divorcent	Marcel	Vincenzo Marano (2)	TV movie
2014	Brèves de comptoir	Jacky	Jean-Michel Ribes	
2014	Retenez bien ma gueule!	Himself	Mathias Gomis	Short
2014	Vaugand	Camparian	Manuel Boursinhac	TV series (1 episode)
