= Isabelle Ferron =

Isabelle Ferron (born 1967) is a French actress, comedian, and dancer both in film and on stage.

== Early life and education ==
Isabelle Ferron was born on January 27, 1967, in Poitiers, France. When she turned seven, her mother enrolled her in the Conservatoire de Poitiers to learn the art of dancing, as well as how to play the piano. In 1987, she moved to Poitiers and trained with Niels Arestrup, then with Maurice Benichou in 1988. Then from 1992 to 1997 she trained with John Strasberg.

== Career ==
Isabelle then entered the theater stage in 1986 with her first performance in Six Assassins Assassinés followed by Un Enfant Mort sur le Trottoir in the same year (she was 19). After long years filled with experiences on stage, she moved to try the screen. She played the role of Didier's wife, Murielle in Didier Bourdon and Bernard Campan's Le Pari (The Bet) in 1997 and more films. From then on, she took turns from being on screen to the stage. In 1999, she was chosen to play the very energetic Lady Capulet in Gerard Presgurvic's version of Roméo et Juliette. She signed their contract without second thoughts, as she knew that she was about to interpret beautiful songs. She had once described her audition for the role, and said that she was first asked to sing a challenging, yet striking song, called La Haine (The Hate) and afterwards a song which she had found funny was called Tu dois te marier (You Must Marry).

After more than a hundred performances as Lady Capulet, Isabelle left the cast on July 21, 2001, to continue her switches from film to stage. She was replaced by Karoline Blandin. Isabelle was still included in the music videos of the two songs, Verone and Aimer. She was also chosen to appear in some TV shows such as Julie Lescaut. Her other stage performances include: "Y’a-t-il un Magicien dans la Salle"(Is there a magician in the room?) and "Un violon sur le toit", the French version of the classic Fiddler on the Roof. Her solo in the aforementioned turned out to be a single as it is probably the only song with coherent lyrics. Isabelle won an award for her role as Golde in 2007 during the Marius awards. She has several plans for her career. The first one is to write a musical with her colleague, Anna Angeli. She describes that in that certain play, she would have a scene where she is alone with the monologue and the music. If not, then Isabelle dreams to earn more roles for films, stage plays and musicals, like Roméo et Juliette. Isabelle Ferron continues to work as it is one of her strongest and deepest desires. In 2008, she was included in the Festival Diva Music (a festival of twenty different musicals). She performed in L'ultime rendez-vous and a solo lecture-musical called Chienne.

== Cinema ==
- 1995 - Pedale Douce by Gabriel Aghion (Chantal)
- 1996 - Golden Boy by Jean-Pierre Vergne
- 1997 - The Bet by Didier Bourdon & Bernard Campan (Murielle)
- 1998 - Monsieur Naphtali by Olivier Schatzky (Muriel)
- 2003 - La Confiance Regne by Etienne Chatillez (Infirmière)
- 2004 - Les Gens Honnêtes Vivent en France by Bob Decout (Sabine Charpentier)

== Television ==
- 1992 - Drôles d'histoires Roger KAHANE
- 2000 - La Maison du Pendu Patrice MARTINEAU
- 2002 - Les Grands Frères Henri HELMAN
- 2003 - Le Grand Patron – Effets Secondaires Claudio TONETTI
- 2005 - Julie Lescaut – Dangereuses Rencontres Daniel JANNEAU
- 2005 - Madame est dans l'Escalier Luc BERAUD
- 2006 - Reporters Gilles BANNIER
- 2007 - Sa Raison d'être Renaud BERTRAND (Muriel Blondel)

== Theater ==
- 1986 - Six Assassins Assassinés - L. BOURQUIN
- 1986 - Un Enfant Mort sur le Trottoir - I. FERRON
- 1987 - Le Millénaire des Capétiens La Villette - P. PREVOST
- 1987 - La Sorcière Guichet Montparnasse - G. O’PRETRE
- 1988 - La Cantatrice Chauve - V. LABUSSIERE
- 1989/90 - Le Prince Travesti Espace Acteur - G. SHELLEY
- 1990 - Salade de Nuit Théâtre Les Blancs Manteaux - M. LERIS
- 1993 - L'Ascenceur Théâtre Les Blancs Manteaux - Roland MARCHISIO
- 1994 - J'ai 20 ans - Roger LOURET
- 2004 - Faux Départ Théâtre Rive Gauche - Thierry HARCOURT
- 2006 - A Fond la Caisse Théâtre La Grande Comédie - Jérôme FOUCHER
- 2008 - Happy Hanouka d'Alex Pandev et Sylvie Audecoeur - Jean-Luc MOREAU
- 2009 - Le siècle sera féminin ou ne sera pas ... - Dominique COUBES & Nathalie VIERNE
- 2010 - "La leçon" - Eugène Ionesco & Samuel Sené

== Musicals ==
- 1988 - Sylphide - S. DORIAN
- 1992 - Les Misérables - Théâtre MogadorLa Royal Shakespeare Cie
- 1993 - La Java des Mémoires Théâtre de la Renaissance - Roger LOURET
- 1993/96 - Twist - Roger LOURET
- 1996/97 - Passe Muraille - Alain SACHS
- 2000/01 - Roméo et Juliette - REDHA
- 2002 - Y'a-t-il un Magicien dans la Salle - Gérard PULLICINO
- 2005/06 - Un Violon sur le Toit Théâtre Comédia & Tournée - J. DESCHAUX & O. BENEZECH
- 2007 - L'Ultime Rendez-Vous Péniche Opéra - Vincent VITTOZ
- 2010/11 - "Chienne" - Alexandre Bonstein
