= Les Trois Frères, le retour =

- Theatrical release poster
- Directed by: Les Inconnus
- Written by: Didier Bourdon; Bernard Campan
- Produced by: Philippe Godeau; Les Inconnus
- Starring: Les Inconnus
- Cinematography: Pascal Caubère
- Edited by: Jeanne Kef
- Music by: Olivier Bernard; Didier Bourdon
- Distributed by: Pan-Européenne; Wild Bunch
- Release date: 12 February 2014
- Running time: 106 minutes
- Country: France
- Language: French
- Budget: $12 million
- Box office: $20.3 million

Les Trois Frères, le retour (English: The Three Brothers are back) is a 2014 French film written, directed by and starring Didier Bourdon and Bernard Campan alongside their Les Inconnus partner Pascal Légitimus. It is the sequel to the blockbuster film Les Trois Frères.

== Cast ==
- Didier Bourdon: Didier Latour
- Bernard Campan: Bernard Latour
- Pascal Légitimus: Pascal Latour
- Sofia Lesaffre: Sarah
- Vivienne Vernes: Moss Godin Matiss
- Fatima Adoum: Sabrina
- Biyouna: Sarah's grandmother
- Sabine Pakora: The nurse
- Christian Hecq : lawyer Maître Vaselin
- Philippine Leroy-Beaulieu: bank clerk at Pascal's bank
- Daniel Russo: Michael's Stepfather
- Alison Wheeler: guest at Moss' party
