= Clémentine Célarié =

French actress, writer, director and singer

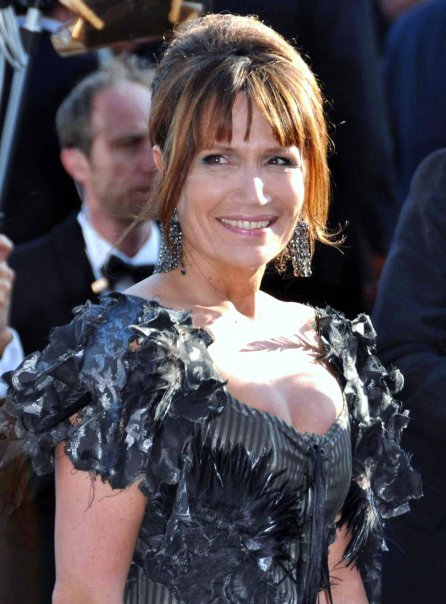
- Clémentine Célarié at the 2009 Cannes Film Festival
- Born: Meryem Célarié; 12 October 1957 (age 68); Dakar, Sénégal
- Occupations: Actress, singer, director, writer
- Years active: 1973-present
- Children: 3

Clémentine Célarié (born 12 October 1957) is a French actress, writer, director and singer.

== Life and career ==
She was born as Meryem Célarié in Dakar in what was then the French colony of Senegal on 12 October 1957. After passing her Baccalaureate, she spent a year living in the United States. She took acting lessons in France and became an actress.

She has three sons, Abraham, Gustave and Balthazar. She lives in Aix-en-Provence.

== In the media ==
In 1994 Clémentine appeared on a TV show for Sidaction hosted by Christophe Dechavanne. In the show, Célarié shared a kiss with an HIV-positive man, to contribute to the fight against misconceptions about the virus.

Célarié supported Socialist Francois Hollande for the presidential election of 2012.

== Author ==
- 2003 : Marcella (Calmann-Lévy)
- 2007 : Mes Ailes (Michel Lafon)
- 2012 : Les Amoureuses (Le Cherche midi)
- 2015 : On s'Aimera (Le Cherche midi)

== Theatre ==
Year	Title	Author	Director	Notes
1983	The Crucible	Arthur Miller	P. Casari	
1984	The Annunciation of Marie	Paul Claudel	P. Casari (2)	
1987	The House of Bernarda Alba	Federico García Lorca	Janine Berdin	
1989	Marcella	Clémentine Célarié	C. Reichert	
1994	The Odd Couple	Neil Simon	Bernard Murat	
1997	Die Goldberg Variationnen	George Tabori	Daniel Benoin	
1997	Dérapage	Arthur Miller	Jérôme Savary	
2001	Madame Sans-Gêne	Victorien Sardou & Émile Moreau	Alain Sachs	Nominated - Molière Award for Best Actress
2003	La Fesse cachée de la lune	Frédéric Longbois	Clémentine Célarié	
2004	Mon cabaret	Clémentine Célarié	Clémentine Célarié (2)	
2004	Électrocardiogramme	Florence Savignat	Clémentine Célarié (3)	
2005	Madame sans chaînes	Clémentine Célarié	Abraham Diallo	One-woman show
2005-06	Le Journal	Jules Renard	Clémentine Célarié (4)	
2006	Les Grandes Occasions	Bernard Slade	Bernard Murat (2)	
2008	La Tectonique des sentiments	Éric-Emmanuel Schmitt	Éric-Emmanuel Schmitt	
2008	Prenez garde à l'amour	Guy de Maupassant	Manuel Durand & Gabor Rassov	
2008	Ma vie d'extra-terrestre	Patricia Assouline, Claude Fraize & Audrey Lemoine	Clémentine Célarié (5)	
2009	Pour Bobby	Serge Valletti	Christophe Correia	
2009	La Serva amorosa	Carlo Goldoni	Christophe Lidon	
2011	Madame Sans-Gêne	Victorien Sardou & Émile Moreau	Alain Sachs (2)	
2011	Des Nouvelles de Maupassant	Guy de Maupassant	Thierry Monfray	
2011-13	Black Like Me	John Howard Griffin	Clémentine Célarié (6)	
2012	Calamity Jane	Jean-Noël Fenwick	Alain Sachs (3)	
2013-15	La Danse immobile	Clémentine Célarié & Thierry Monfray	Clémentine Célarié (7)	
2015	Twenty-Four Hours in the Life of a Woman	Stefan Zweig	Steve Suissa	
2016	Le Monde de Rita	Clémentine Célarié	Clémentine Célarié (8)	
2016	Darius	Jean-Benoît Patricot	Anne Bouvier	
2019	Une vie	Guy de Maupassant	Arnaud Denis	

== Filmography ==
Year	Title	Role	Director	Notes
1983	Garçon!	Margot	Claude Sautet	
1983	Ballade sanglante		Sylvain Madigan	Short
1984	The Vengeance of the Winged Serpent		Gérard Oury	
1984	Paroles et musique	Michel's girl	Élie Chouraqui	
1985	Le téléphone sonne toujours deux fois !!	Annabella	Jean-Pierre Vergne	
1985	Les Nanas	Eliane	Annick Lanoë	
1985	Blanche et Marie	Fernande	Jacques Renard	
1985	Moi vouloir toi	Martine	Patrick Dewolf	
1986	La gitane	Elsa	Philippe de Broca	
1986	Justice de flic	Dorothée	Michel Gérard	
1986	Betty Blue	Annie	Jean-Jacques Beineix	Nominated - César Award for Best Supporting Actress
1986	Le complexe du kangourou	Claire Chaumette	Pierre Jolivet	
1986	La femme secrète	Camille	Sébastien Grall	
1987	La vie dissolue de Gérard Floque	Cécile	Georges Lautner	
1987	Cinéma 16	Claire	Renaud Saint-Pierre	TV series (1 episode)
1988	Sand and Blood	Marion	Jeanne Labrune	
1988	Sanguines	Marine	Christian François	
1988	Île flottante		Pascale Thirode	Short
1988	Sueurs froides	Anne	Eric Brach	TV series (1 episode)
1989	Nocturne Indien	Christine	Alain Corneau	Nominated - César Award for Best Supporting Actress
1989	Morte fontaine	Kouka	Marco Pico	TV movie
1990	Adrénaline		Anita Assal & John Hudson	
1990	Le silence d'ailleurs	Jeanne	Guy Mouyal	
1990	Coup de foudre	Isabelle Meyral	Michel Wyn	TV series (1 episodes)
1991	Génial, mes parents divorcent !	Julien's Mother	Patrick Braoudé	
1991	Niklaus und Sammy		Alain Bloch	
1991	Poison d'amour	Agnès	Hugues de Laugardière	TV movie
1991	Renseignements généraux	Lily Zigler	Hugues de Laugardière (2)	TV series (1 episodes)
1992	Les années campagne	The Mother	Philippe Leriche	
1992	Savage Nights	Marianne	Cyril Collard	
1992	2 bis, rue de la Combine	Françoise	Igaal Niddam	TV movie
1992	Turbulences	Constance	Élisabeth Rappeneau	TV movie
1993	Vent d'est	Anna	Robert Enrico	
1993	Abracadabra	Martha	Harry Cleven	
1993	Toxic Affair	Sophie	Philomène Esposito	
1993	Rose	The Woman	Alain Berliner	Short
1994	La Vengeance d'une blonde	Marie-Ange de la Baume	Jeannot Szwarc	
1994	Les Braqueuses	Bijou	Jean-Paul Salomé	
1994	The Heart's Cry	Deborah	Idrissa Ouedraogo	
1994	La rage au coeur	Jeanne	Robin Davis	TV movie
1995	À cran	Clara	Solange Martin	
1995	Les Misérables	Catherine / Fantine	Claude Lelouch	
1995	Sept ans et demi de réflexion	Zina	Sylvie Flepp	Short
1995	Sans souci	The Woman	Jean-Michel Isabel	Short
1995	La règle du silence	Clara	Marc Rivière & Marie Rivière	TV movie
1996	XY, drôle de conception	Sandrine Rey	Jean-Paul Lilienfeld	
1996	La vie avant tout	Liliana	Miguel Courtois	TV movie
1997	Les Soeurs Soleil	Gloria	Jeannot Szwarc (2)	
1998	La femme d'un seul homme	Sabine	Robin Renucci	TV movie
1998	Il n'y a pas d'amour sans histoires	Monique	Jérôme Foulon	TV movie
1999	Les coquelicots sont revenus	Nathalie	Richard Bohringer	TV movie
1999	Les enfants du jour	Lisa	Harry Cleven (2)	TV movie
2000	Room to Rent	Vivienne	Khalid Al-Haggar	
2000	La tribu de Zoé	Zoé Melkian	Pierre Joassin	TV movie
2000	La banquise	Clémence	Pierre Lary	TV movie
2001	Du côté des filles	Liza	Françoise Decaux-Thomelet	
2001	Lawless Heart	Corrine	Tom Hunsinger & Neil Hunter	Nominated - Chlotrudis Awards - Best Cast
2001	A Hell of a Day	Michèle	Marion Vernoux	
2001	Objectif bac	Sophie Rémy	Patrick Volson	TV movie
2001	La cape et l'épée	The Minstrel	Jean-Jacques Amsellem	TV series (1 episode)
2002	Justice de femme	Véronique Chevallier	Claude-Michel Rome	TV movie
2003	Mauvais esprit	Béatrice Copy	Patrick Alessandrin	
2004	Mona lisier	Mona	Clode Hingant	Short
2004	Mon fils d'ailleurs	Coline	Williams Crépin	TV movie
2004	Le Miroir de l'eau	Josépha	Edwin Baily	TV mini-series
2005	Bien dégagé derrière les oreilles	Suzy Brilliant	Anne Deluz	TV movie
2005	Les femmes d'abord	France	Peter Kassovitz	TV movie
2005	Un coin d'Azur	Madeleine Neri	Heikki Arekallio	TV movie
2005	Les vagues	Myriam	Frédéric Carpentier	TV movie
2006	Paul	The Mother	Philippe Uchan	Short
2006	Monsieur Léon	Raymonde	Pierre Boutron	TV movie
2008	Sa raison d'être	Hélène	Renaud Bertrand	TV movie
2008	Les enfants d'Orion	Edwige	Philippe Venault	TV movie
2009	La différence, c'est que c'est pas pareil	Anne	Pascal Laëthier	
2009	Victor	Sylvie Saillard	Thomas Gilou	
2009	Le siffleur	Viviane Vatinet	Philippe Lefebvre	
2009	La passion selon Didier	Juliette	Lorenzo Gabriele	TV movie
2009	Juste un peu d'@mour	Jeanne	Nicolas Herdt	TV movie
2009-10	Les Bleus	Commissioner Nicole Mercier	Christophe Douchand, Stéphane Clavier, ...	TV series (22 episodes)
2010	Le gendre idéal 2	Olivia	Arnaud Sélignac	TV movie
2010	Les invincibles	Gisèle	Pierric Gantelmi d'Ille & Alexandre Castagnetti	TV series (7 episodes)
2011	La Ligne droite	Marie-Claude	Régis Wargnier	
2011	The Adopted	Millie	Mélanie Laurent	
2011	J'ai peur d'oublier	Fabienne	Élisabeth Rappeneau (2)	TV movie Festival de la Rochelle - Best Performance by an Actress; Nominated - Monte-Carlo Television Festival - Best Actress
2011	Marthe Richard	Marthe Richard	Thierry Binisti	TV movie
2013	Love Is in the Air	Marie	Alexandre Castagnetti (2)	
2013	Myster Mocky présente	Martha	Jean-Pierre Mocky	TV series (1 episode)
2013	R.I.S, police scientifique	Nicole Langlois	Hervé Brami	TV series (2 episodes)
2014	Meurtres à Rocamadour	Sophie Lacaze	Lionel Bailliu	TV movie
2014	Scènes de ménages	Marianne	Francis Duquet	TV series (1 episode)
2015	Les yeux ouverts	Anne	Lorraine Lévy	TV movie
2015	Accusé	Hélène Vidal	Julien Despaux	TV series (1 episode)
2016	Two Is a Family	Samantha	Hugo Gélin	
2016-2017	Lebowitz contre Lebowitz	Paule Lebowitz	Christophe Barraud, Frédéric Berthe, ....	TV series (16 episodes)
2017-2018	Vestiaires	The Star	Fabrice Chanut & Franck Lebon	TV series (3 episodes)
2018	A Thousand Pieces	Nicole Parmentier	Véronique Mériadec	
2018	Edmond	Sarah Bernhardt	Alexis Michalik	
