= Arvind Ethan David =

British film producer

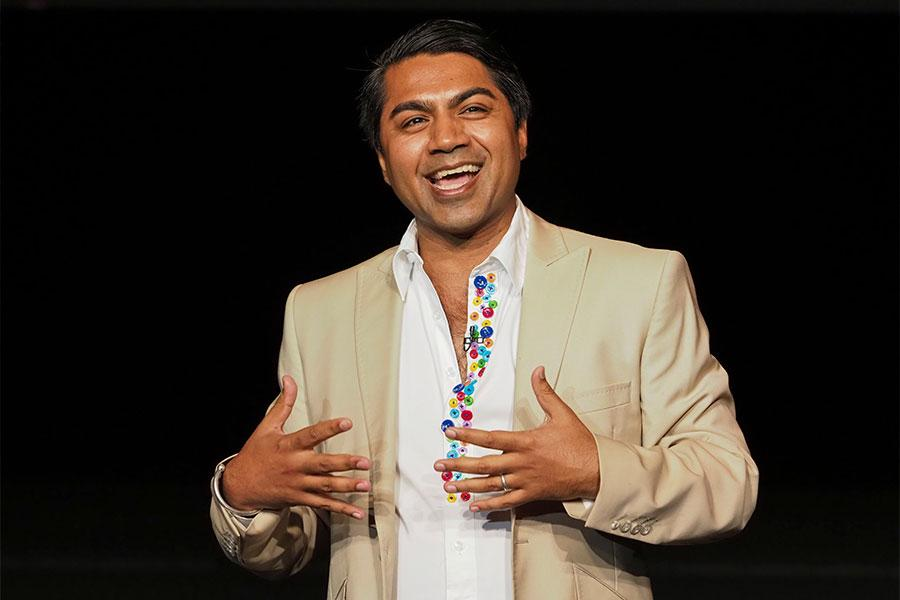
- David (2017)
- Born: 21 February 1975 (age 51); Malaysia
- Years active: 2005 - present

Arvind Ethan David (born 21 February 1975) is a Malaysian-born, British film producer. He is best known for producing a stage musical of Jagged Little Pill, based on the album by Alanis Morissette, and the American adaptation of Douglas Adams' science fiction detective comedy novel series Dirk Gently's Holistic Detective Agency on BBC America, which premiered in October 2016. Other feature films he has produced include Tormented and French Film.

== Slingshot Productions ==
David founded film production and finance company Slingshot in 2005 in partnership with Norwegian venture capitalist Thomas Hoegh. They were soon being viewed as dynamic entrepreneurs by respected trades such as Variety, as the company quickly established itself as a notable player in the UK film scene. Slingshot has produced and co-financed five movies in the subsequent five years. They secured co-financing for Tormented with BBC Films and Screen West Midlands, and a distribution partnership with Pathe and Warner Bros.

== Life and career ==
David is a graduate of Oxford University and London Business School, and is also a qualified solicitor.

David is currently the Principal of Prodigal, an entertainment company based in Los Angeles, California that tells stories across television, film, comics, audio plays, and theatre. Prior to Prodigal, David served as the Executive Director of Ideate Media, a production and financing company with offices in Los Angeles and Kuala Lumpur.

=== Television ===
David produced the American adaptation of Douglas Adams' science fiction detective comedy novel series Dirk Gently's Holistic Detective Agency, which aired on BBC America and is streaming on Hulu and Netflix. David is also co-creator/showrunner of Knights of the Borrowed Dark, based on the novels by Dave Rudden, and is adapting his and Mike Carey’s comic series, Darkness Visible, for Intrepid Pictures and IDW Entertainment. He also is writing on Neil Gaiman’s Anansi Boys for Amazon. David was executive producer for #While We Breathe: A Night of Creative Protest, a benefit for the NAACP Legal Defense and Educational Fund, Inc and The Bail Project, Black Organizing for Leadership and Dignity (BOLD), BYP100 Education Fund, Forced Trajectory Project (FTP), The Justice Committee, and SONG which aired on Youtube in 2020.

=== Writing ===
As a writer, he has published several short stories, and co-wrote an essay with English comedian David Baddiel for The Atheist's Guide to Christmas.

=== Comics ===
David has written two monthly comic series for IDW Publishing, including Darkness Visible, the title he co-created with novelist Mike Carey (Lucifer, The Girl with All the Gifts) David is currently writing a graphic novel for Ted Adams’ Clover Press called Gray that is based on Oscar Wilde’s The Picture of Dorian Gray.

=== Theatre ===
David produced a stage musical of Jagged Little Pill, based on the album by Alanis Morissette, written by Academy Award winner Diablo Cody and directed by Tony Award winner Diane Paulus. The musical opened on Broadway in December 2019. He has also seen recognition as a playwright, winning Best Adaptation for Dirk at the 28th LA Weekly Theater Awards (2007), based on the character created by Douglas Adams.

=== Broadway Wine Club ===
David founded Broadway Wine Club, a subscription service that offers members exclusive access to small-batch vintages, packaged with collectible labels by theatre designers.

=== Other work ===
David is a partner in projects with Hatch Escapes, together they are launching Mother of Frankenstein, a table-top Escape Room in a Box game inspired by the novel Frankenstein and are in production on an escape room called The Ladder which is set to open in 2020.

== Filmography ==
- Sugarhouse (2007, directed by Gary Love)
- Faintheart (2008, directed by Vito Rocco)
- French Film (2008, directed by Jackie Oudney)
- Tormented (2009, directed by Jon Wright)
- The Infidel (2010, written by David Baddiel and directed by Josh Appignanesi)
- Tombiruo: Penunggu Rimba (2017, directed by Seth Larney)
