= Pierre Meyrand =

- Born: 3 August 1932; Paris, France
- Died: 25 October 1999 (aged 67); Brunoy, France
- Occupation: Actor
- Years active: 1966–1999
- Spouse: Artlette Téphany

Pierre Jean Marie Meyrand (3 August 1932 – 25 October 1999) was a French actor.

== Biography ==
Pierre Meyrand was born on 3 August 1932 in the 11th arrondissement of Paris. In 1958, he began his career in theatre with Roger Planchon at the Théâtre de la Cité in Villeurbanne. He played in George Dandin ou le Mari confondu and Le Bourgeois gentilhomme of Molière, Life of Galileo of Bertolt Brecht and also The Three Musketeers of Alexandre Dumas, where he played D'Artagnan.

In 1973, he met Arlette Téphany with whom he created their own company named Théâtre en Liberté. From 1975 to 1985, he was the director of the Chelles theatre, and was after that named co-director of the national dramatic centre of Limoges, the Théâtre de l'Union, with Arlette, who became his wife.

In 1995, he became widely famous obtaining the Molière Award for Best Actor for his memorable role of Isodore Lechat in Octave Mirbeau's Les affaires sont les affaires ("Business Is Business"). But it is also that same year that the French Minister of Culture Jacques Toubon decided to liberate him and his wife of the directoral responsibilities of the national dramatic centre.

In 1995, he played the role of Charles-Henri Rougemont in The Three Brothers, the future father-in-law of Didier Latour, one of the main characters portrayed by Didier Bourdon.

Pierre Meyrand died on 25 October 1999 in Brunoy of cancer at age 67.
