= Smaïn =

French comedian and actor (born 1958)

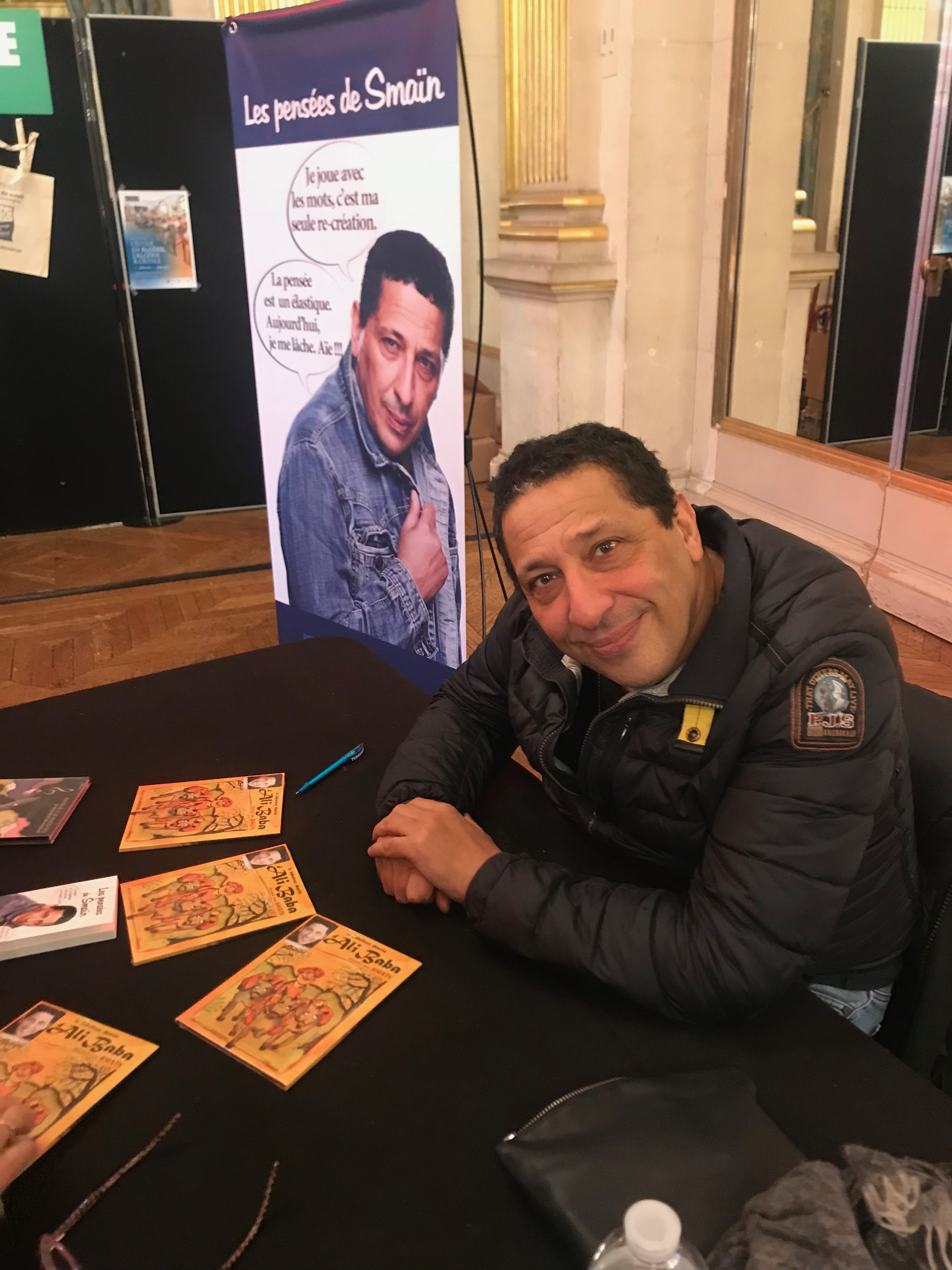
- Smaïn in 2018
- Born: Smaïn Fairouze; January 3, 1958 (age 68); Constantine, Algeria
- Occupations: comedian, actor

Smaïn (born Smaïn Fairouze; January 3, 1958, in Constantine, Algeria) is a French comedian and actor of Algerian descent.

== Biography ==
=== Childhood ===
Born in 1958 in Constantine, Algeria, to an unknown father and mother, Smaïn Fairouze was taken in by the children's ward of the civil hospital. In 1960, brought back to France by an administrative assistant, he joined his foster family. His adoptive father, a street sweeper at the Régie immobilière de la ville de Paris, was Algerian and his adoptive mother, a cleaning lady, was Moroccan. He attended the Notre-Dame school in Saint-Mandé and then the Saint-Michel high school in St Mandé. During his childhood, he practiced choral singing for many years.

Smaïn, to break into the world of show business, counted on the limitless support of his adoptive parents:

Of modest origins, they looked with suspicion at the world of artists. They constantly told me that there are many called and few chosen ... But my desire quickly got the better of their advice! Unfortunately, they died too early to be able to benefit from my success. But I hope they would have been proud of it!

=== Professional career ===
Smaïn began with a long career in café-théâtre in the 1980s, performing in small Parisian cabarets. Later, he met Philippe Bouvard who offered him a place in his Théâtre de Bouvard. It was there that he expanded his circle of friends by meeting Didier Bourdon, Bernard Campan, Pascal Légitimus and Seymour Brussel. With these four companions, he formed a small comedy group, Les Cinq, which toured for a few years.

Smaïn ended up choosing the solo show. Little by little, with the help of his pianist Alain Bernard, he found success and performed in shows over the years: English beur in 1986 broadcast on 18 August (version filmed at the International Festival of Actors' Performance of June 1987) on La Cinq, T'en veux ? in 1989, and Comme ça se prononce in 1996, a show for which he won the Molière for best Indonesian, a Victoire de la musique as well as a Grand Prix Sacem. At the same time, Smaïn was offered more and more roles in the cinema, notably in L'Œil au beur(re) noir, a film which received the César for best first film in 1988.

He also participated in several shows by Les Enfoirés in 1992, 1993, 1995, 1997 and 1998.

In 2008, he recorded with the Orchestre de la Suisse romande, Le Carnaval des animaux by Camille Saint-Saëns, for which he wrote the libretto. This will be followed by a collaboration with the Pau Pays de Béarn Orchestra who commissioned several musical tales for orchestra, Rayane and the Maestro, The Disappeared of the page 41 and most recently The Fabulous Journey of the Traveling Music Stand.

In 2009, he was part of the jury of the show France has incredible talent, during the fourth season, replacing Patrick Dupond, and collaborates with Michel Legrand on the production of his album Délit de fa dièse.

In 2012, Smaïn returned to the stage of the Théâtre Rive Gauche in the play Réactions en chaîne, which he performed from January to March.

In 2014, he participated in a video clip in support of the Algerian head of state Abdelaziz Bouteflika as part of the presidential campaign. Like other artists, he then indicates that this recovery was done without his knowledge, and that it was initially only a piece paying tribute to Algeria.

In 2019, he participated in the first season of the show The Masked Singer, in the costume of the monster and he was eliminated during the third show and finished tenth.

== Distinctions ==
- Officier de l'ordre national du Mérite (2024)

== Filmography ==
=== Actor ===
==== Cinema ====
- 1982: Te marre pas... c'est pour rire! by Jacques Besnard: A worker
- 1982: Le Grand Frère by Francis Girod: Abdel
- 1984: La Smala by Jean-Loup Hubert: a young Maghrebian
- 1984: Femmes de personne by Christopher Frank: a radiologist assistant
- 1985: Le Téléphone sonne toujours deux fois by Jean-Pierre Vergne: Momo
- 1986: Les Frères Pétard by Hervé Palud: a drug smuggler
- 1986: Le Bonheur a encore frappé by Jean-Luc Trotignon: the deputy
- 1987: Flag by Jacques Santi: Abdel
- 1987: The Black Eye by Serge Meynard: Rachid
- 1989: J'aurais jamais dû croiser son regard by Jean-Marc Longval: Bambi
- 1990: On peut toujours rêver by and with Pierre Richard: Rachid Merzahoui
- 1992: Siméon by Euzhan Palcy
- 1994: Parano, sketch film: Jimmy
- 1995: Tom is all alone by Fabien Onteniente: the street musician (cameo)
- 1995: Three Lives and One Death by Raoul Ruiz : Luca
- 1996: Les Deux Papas et la Maman by Jean-Marc Longval: Salim
- 1998: Charité biz'ness by Thierry Barthes: Sam
- 1998: Bingo ! by Maurice Ilouz: Vincent
- 1999: Recto/Verso by Jean-Marc Longval (with Michel Muller): Fred
- 1999: Le Schpountz by Gérard Oury: Irénée
- 2000: Old School by Karim Abbou: M. Fonblard
- 2003: Rien que du bonheur by Denis Parent: himself
- 2003: Les Clefs de bagnole by Laurent Baffie: an actor who refuses to shoot with Laurent
- 2012: Pauvre Richard by Malik Chibane: Farid
- 2013: A Little Guy from Ménilmontant by Alain Minier: Maklouf
- 2014: The Bag of Flour by خديجة لوكلير (Kadija Leclere): Sarah's Father
- 2014: Certified halal by Mahmoud Zemmouri: Aziz
- 2015: The Doors of the Sun by Jean-Marc Minéo: Slimane
- 2022: Placed by Nessim Chikhaoui: Elias' father
- 2022: The Imaginary Doctor by Ahmed Hamidi: Inspector Bachir
- 2023: The Little Blond of the Casbah by Alexandre Arcady: M. Farès

==== Short film ====
- 2016: English by Pascal Lastrajoli: Luc
- 2019: You'll go to paradise by Rost and Thomas Keumurian: Nabil

==== Television ====
- 1983: Dorothée: The Show
- 2001: Commissariat Bastille by Gilles Béhat : Captain Mo Toumani
  - The Red Jacket (2001)
  - Crossfire (2001)
- 2002: Commissariat Bastille by Jean-Marc Seban
  - The Most Beautiful Age (2002)
  - Countdown (2002)
  - Hunting License (2002)
  - Cast in Concrete (2002)
- 2005: A cooking teacher by Christiane Lehérissey: Adam Touami
- 2006: For the love of God by Zakia Tahri-Bouchaâla: Kevin's father
- 2006: Harkis by Alain Tasma: Saïd
- 2010: Tomboy (TV film for France 2) by David Delrieux: Amrani
- 2011: Camping Paradis (TV series - season 2, episode 5 A Ghost in Paradise): Christian Dissaut
- 2014-2015: Brothers in Arms, TV series historical by Rachid Bouchareb and Pascal Blanchard: presentation by Saiaeng Wahena
- 2016: At your service (TV series - season 3) by Florian Hessique: the bailiff
- 2020: Sam (TV series - season 4, episode 4): Moscow

=== Director ===
- 1994: À quoi ça rime (short film)
- 1996: Les Deux Papas et la Maman (co-directed with Jean-Marc Longval)

=== Dubbing ===
- 1981: Le Mystère de la troisième planète: Professeur Newton
- 2007: Franky Snow (animated series): Franky Snow

=== Narrator ===
- 2004: Peter and the Wolf by Sergei Prokofiev, direction orchestra Fayçal Karoui
- 2008: The Story of the Little Tailor by Tibor Harsányi and The Carnival of the Animals by Camille Saint-Saëns, orchestral direction Yannis Pouspourikas, pianists Caroline Sageman and Lidija Bizjak (Lyrinx)
- 2014: Peter and the Wolf by Prokofiev and The Carnival of the Animals by Camille Saint-Saëns, orchestral direction Raphaël Brunon at the Théâtre du Puy-en-Velay (Haute-Loire)

== Theatre ==
=== English ===
- 1986: English beur
- 1988: Prise de tête
- 1989: T'en veux ?
- 1992: Zizi Rider
- 1996: Comme ça se prononce
- 1998: En attendant le soleil
- 2004: Rebelote
- 2013: Mon dernier... avant le prochain

=== Actor ===
- 1985: Tous aux abris by J.-J. Burat, directed by Philippe Ogouz, Théâtre Saint Martin
- 1994: Les Fourberies de Scapin by Molière, directed by Jean-Luc Moreau, Théâtre du Gymnase
- 1995: Les Fourberies de Scapin by Molière, directed by Jean-Luc Moreau, tour
- 2011: Réactions en chaîne by Smaïn and Jean-Marc Longval, directed by Pascal Légitimus, tour
- 2012: Réactions en chaîne by Smaïn and Jean-Marc Longval, directed by Marion Sarraut, Théâtre Rive Left
- 2013: La Ménagère improvisée by Smaïn, Éric Carrière and Jean-Marc Longval, directed by Gil Galliot, Théâtre L'Archipel

=== Director ===
- 2001: We said we'd meet up in 10 years, play by Vincent Azé, Théâtre Rive Gauche
- 2003: Sandrine Alexi: Prise de têtes, Comédie-Caumartin
- 2007: Les Glandeurs nature, Théâtre du Gymnase Marie-Bell
- 2018: English by Jeff Freza, Théâtre du Marais

== TV shows ==
- 2002: Who wants to be a millionaire? with Évelyne Dhéliat (earnings 150000 €)
- 2003: English on TF1
- 2009: France has incredible talent on M6
- 2019: English on TF1

== Publication ==
- Smaïn (2011). Je reviens me chercher (in French). Neuilly-sur-Seine: Éditions Michel Lafon. ISBN 978-2-7499-1434-3..
