= Le téléphone sonne toujours deux fois!! =

- Directed by: Jean-Pierre Vergne
- Written by: Didier Bourdon; Seymour Brussel; Bernard Campan; Pascal Légitimus; Jean-Pierre Vergne
- Produced by: André Djaoui
- Starring: Didier Bourdon; Seymour Brussel; Bernard Campan; Pascal Légitimus
- Cinematography: Robert Fraisse
- Edited by: Nicole Berckmans
- Music by: Craig Richey
- Distributed by: UGC Distribution
- Release date: 23 January 1985
- Running time: 92 minutes
- Country: France
- Language: English
- Box office: $3.8 million

Le téléphone sonne toujours deux fois !! (French pronunciation: [lə telefɔn sɔn tuʒuʁ dø fwa], The Telephone Always Rings Twice) is a 1985 French comedy film directed by Jean-Pierre Vergne.

== Premise ==
Marc Elbichon, private detective, investigates about a mysterious serial killer who signs his crimes overwriting a phone dial on the victim's front. To help him, he calls his friends Blacky and Franck, a reporter, Ugo Campani, and his man cleaner, Momo.

== Data sheet ==
- Title : Le téléphone sonne toujours deux fois !!
- Director : Jean-Pierre Vergne
- Writers : Didier Bourdon, Seymour Brussel, Bernard Campan, Pascal Légitimus et Jean-Pierre Vergne
- Producer : André Djaoui
- Music : Gabriel Yared
- Picture : Robert Fraisse
- Editing : Nicole Berckmans
- Shooting : 1984
- Length : 1h32
- Release : 23 January 1985

== Cast ==
- Didier Bourdon : Marc Elbichon / Marcel Bichon
- Seymour Brussel : Franck Potin
- Bernard Campan : Ugo Campani
- Pascal Légitimus : Blacky
- Smaïn : Momo
- Clémentine Célarié : Annabella
- Jean-Claude Brialy : The commissioner
- Henri Courseaux : Doctor Clipps
- Dominique Pinon : Professor Pichon
- Michel Constantin : The cinema director
- Darry Cowl : The policeman with Jeep
- Patrick Sébastien : The blind
- Jean Yanne : The man phoning
- Michel Galabru : « Marraine »
- Michel Crémadès : The optician
- Jean Reno : Marraine's confidence man
- Annie Savarin : A victim
- Julie Arnold : Pornographic actress
