= Conservatoire à rayonnement régional de Poitiers =

Music and scenic arts school in Poitiers, France

Coordinates: 46.5864°N 0.3432°E

The Conservatoire à rayonnement régional de Poitiers is a school of higher education for music, drama, and dance located in Poitiers, France. The institution is a charter school of France's Ministry of Culture and is operated by the Direction régionale des affaires culturelles. The conservatory awards degrees in music performance, music education, choreographic studies, and theater.

== Notable alumni ==
- Jehnny Beth
- Gerd Boder
- Isabelle Ferron

== Notable faculty ==
- Antoine Geoffroy-Dechaume
- Noémi Rime
