= Antoine Geoffroy-Dechaume =

Antoine Geoffroy-Dechaume (7 October 1905 in Paris – 15 April 2000) was a French musicologist, organist and harpsichordist. As a musicologist he was considered "the leading French pioneer in the field of early music, both in the way it should be performed and in respect for the original scores of 16th, 17th and 18th century composers." His research and writings, especially his book The Secrets of Early Music, or the search for its interpretation (1964), is credited as the catalyst for the revived interest in French baroque music by the classical music world during the 1970s. He was named a Chevalier of the Légion d'honneur by the government of France.

== Life and career ==
Born in Paris, Geoffroy-Dechaume studied at the Paris Conservatoire from 1923 to 1931 where he was a pupil of Eugène Gigout (organ) and Georges Caussade (composition). From 1922 to 1937 he served as organist of Notre Dame de Pontoise and from 1937 to 1939 he taught on the faculty of the University of Caen Lower Normandy. He then took a position at the Conservatoire à rayonnement régional de Poitiers where he led a highly regarded early music group, the Collegium Musicae Antiquae. From 1962 until his retirement he was professor at the Schola Cantorum de Paris.

Geoffroy-Dechaume was the resident harpsichordist at the Bath International Music Festival during the 1960s. The festival notably used a score he had prepared for a revival of Jean-Philippe Rameau's 1733 opera Hippolyte et Aricie. He also prepared scores for broadcasts by the BBC, performances at the Aix-en-Provence Festival and the English Bach Festivals, and for concerts given by the Orchestre National de France.
