= Noémi Rime =

French soprano

Noémi Rime is a French soprano. She regularly appears in opera productions by William Christie's Les Arts Florissants ensemble. Her roles have included Cleone in Médée, Dido in Dido and Aeneas, and Fatime in Les Indes galantes. She currently teaches on the faculty of the Conservatoire à rayonnement régional de Poitiers.

== Biography ==
First prize in song and early music at the Conservatoire national supérieure de musique et de danse de Paris, she worked with Les Arts florissants by William Christie, which led her, in France and abroad (United States, Brazil, Argentina, Japan, Canada, Italy, Poland, etc.), to perform cantatas (Clérambault, Monteclair ...), court arias, religious music (François Couperin, Sébastien de Brossard, Marc-Antoine Charpentier, Jean-Philippe Rameau, Jean-Joseph Cassanéa by Mondonville, etc.) and operas (the role of Dido in Dido and Aeneas by Henry Purcell1, Orfeo by Luigi Rossi, etc.). She has performed La Création et Les Saisons by Haydn under the direction of François Xavier Bilger with the lyric orchestra of Avignon, as well as contemporary works by Gualterio Dazzi with Le Parlement de Musique under the direction of Martin Gester. With the Baroque Ensemble of Limoges under the direction of Christophe Coin, she sang at the "Festival du Vieux Lyon".

She has participated in numerous stage productions: Atys, Le Malade imaginaire, Les Indes galantes2, The Fairy Queen, Médée3, Armide, working with Jean-Marie Villégier, Alfredo Arias, Adrian Noble, Patrice Caurier, Moshe Leiser, Gabriele Doehring, under the musical direction of William Christie, Philippe Herreweghe and Michel Schneider for the stages of Paris (Théâtre du Châtelet, Théâtre des Champs-Élysées, Opéra-Comique), Montpellier, Caen, Aix, La Chaise-Dieu, Madrid, Lisbon, New York .

Noémi Rime teaches at the CNR in Tours (since 1996) in the early music department, where she leads the vocal music interpretation class and at the Poitiers conservatory (since 2010), singing class (vocal technique and interpretation) [ ref. necessary].

She is the wife of bass-baritone François Bazola [ref. required], choir director in the vocal and instrumental ensemble Les Arts Florissants conducted by William Christie. It is part of the Consonances ensemble founded by François Bazola [ref. necessary].

== Selective discography ==
His discography is varied; she records for the Erato, Harmonia Mundi, Opus 111, Vérany, Sirius, Ligia Digital and Accord labels.

   [4]
