= A Thousand Pieces =

- Directed by: Véronique Mériadec
- Written by: Véronique Mériadec; Gérald Massé
- Produced by: Yannick Bernard
- Starring: Clémentine Célarié; Serge Riaboukine
- Cinematography: Pierre Baboin
- Edited by: Diane Logan; Roxane Foare
- Music by: Lyse Eden
- Production companies: Big Bang Productions; Acacia Films
- Distributed by: Destiny Films
- Release dates: 14 February 2018 (Global Motion Picture Awards); 3 October 2018 (France)
- Running time: 82 minutes
- Country: France
- Language: French
- Budget: $58.000

A Thousand Pieces (French: En mille morceaux) is a 2018 French drama directed by Véronique Mériadec.

== Plot ==
In 1977, Éric Gaubert murders Olivier, the child of Nicole Parmentier. Twenty-five years later, this broken-hearted mother makes an appointment with the murderer of her son, who has just been released from prison. What is the purpose of this meeting? A simple revenge or the desire to understand what pushed this man to commit the irreparable?

== Cast ==
- Clémentine Célarié : Nicole Parmentier
- Serge Riaboukine : Eric Gaubert
  - Juan-Carlos Ruiz : Young Eric Gaubert
- Baptiste Marchais : Olivier
- Lily Meriadec : The little girl

== Accolades ==
Award / Film Festival	Category	Recipients and nominees	Result
2018 Cyprus International Film Festival	Best Feature Film	Véronique Mériadec	Won
2018 Cyprus International Film Festival	Best Director	Véronique Mériadec	Won
2018 Cyprus International Film Festival	Best Actor in a Leading Role	Serge Riaboukine	Won
2018 Cyprus International Film Festival	Best Screenplay	Véronique Mériadec & Gérald Massé	Won
2018 Cyprus International Film Festival	Best Editing	Diane Logan & Roxane Foare	Won

== Production ==
Principal photography on the film began in December 2016 in Dreux and lasted only two weeks.
