= The Bet (1997 film) =

- Directed by: Didier Bourdon; Bernard Campan
- Written by: Didier Bourdon; Bernard Campan
- Produced by: Claude Berri
- Starring: Didier Bourdon; Bernard Campan; Isabelle Ferron
- Release date: 15 October 1997
- Running time: 100 minutes
- Language: French
- Budget: $8.5 million
- Box office: $23.6 million

The Bet (French title: Le Pari) is a 1997 film directed, about smoking cessation, written by and starring Didier Bourdon and Bernard Campan of the French comic trio Les Inconnus ("The Unknowns").

== Plot ==
Bernard is a teacher in the suburbs and lives with Victoria. Didier is a wealthy Parisian pharmacist and is married to Murielle, Victoria's sister. While the former drives a rusty car, the latter drives a black Mercedes. Both brothers-in-law are complete opposites and hate each other. During dinner, Didier and Bernard make a bet: to stop smoking for fifteen days, until the next family get-together. The first days go off like a dream and both are on top of the world. But things quickly turn sour. Didier and Bernard find it harder and harder to resist the temptation. They become irritable, suspicious, they lie; until the fifteenth day: the family get-together. They have kept their word, but relations between them and their wives are at an all-time low. Despite this, they are both determined to remain non-smokers.

== Cast ==
- Didier Bourdon as Didier
- Bernard Campan as Bernard
- Isabelle Ferron as Murielle
- Isabel Otero as Victoria
- Hélène Surgère as Madame Ramirez
- Roger Ibáñez as Vincente Ramirez
- Kelly Lawson as Élodie
- François Berléand as Doctor Bricourt
- Jean-Roger Milo as Policeman
- Régis Laspalès as Gilbert
- Pascal Légitimus as A guest

== Reception ==
The film opened at number one at the French box office with a gross of 34,739,705 French Francs ($5.9 million). It went on to gross $54.3 million.
