= List of 1997 box office number-one films in France =

This is a list of films which have placed number one at the weekly box office in France during 1997. Amounts are in French franc.

== Number one films ==
#	Week End Date	Film	Box Office	Notes	Ref
1	January 7, 1997	The Hunchback of Notre Dame	19,734,208		
2	January 14, 1997	The Hunchback of Notre Dame	7,347,335		
3	January 21, 1997	Le Plus Beau Métier du monde	6,221,556	Le Plus Beau Métier du monde reached number one in its sixth week of release	
4	January 28, 1997	Ransom	23,946,694		
5	February 4, 1997	Didier	21,669,125		
6	February 11, 1997	Didier	17,103,344		
7	February 17, 1997	Space Jam	16,462,710	Space Jam reached number one in its second week of release.	
8	February 24, 1997	Space Jam	13,484,329		
9	March 3, 1997	Mars Attacks!	24,610,081		
10	March 10, 1997	Mars Attacks!	16,548,525		
11	March 18, 1997	Star Wars (Special Edition)	17,576,885		
12	March 25, 1997	Star Wars (Special Edition)	13,841,356		
13	April 1, 1997	101 Dalmatians	28,386,889		
14	April 8, 1997	101 Dalmatians	21,179,752		
15	April 15, 1997	101 Dalmatians	21,372,743		
16	April 22, 1997	101 Dalmatians	25,543,193		
17	April 29, 1997	Return of the Jedi (Special Edition)	13,268,027	The Special Edition of Return of the Jedi reached number one in its second weekend of release	
18	May 5, 1997	La Vérité si je mens !	18,537,563		
19	May 13, 1997	The Fifth Element	55,179,922	The Fifth Element had a record opening for a French film	
20	May 20, 1997	The Fifth Element	45,637,574		
21	May 27, 1997	The Fifth Element	25,317,850		
22	June 3, 1997	The Fifth Element	19,067,765		
23	June 10, 1997	The Fifth Element	15,891,406		
24	June 17, 1997	The Fifth Element	12,227,936		
25	June 24, 1997	The Fifth Element	9,745,871		
26	July 1, 1997	Liar Liar	28,910,354		
27	July 9, 1997	Metro	10,179,938		
28	July 15, 1997	Batman & Robin	21,165,012		
29	July 22, 1997	Scream	12,084,732		
30	July 29, 1997	Speed 2: Cruise Control	18,133,200		
31	August 5, 1997	Speed 2: Cruise Control	10,214,640		
32	August 12, 1997	Men in Black	58,651,812	Men in Black reached number one in its second week of release	
33	August 19, 1997	Men in Black	33,511,104		
34	August 26, 1997	Men in Black	27,384,732		
35	September 2, 1997	Men in Black	25,500,276		
36	September 9, 1997	Men in Black	15,996,492		
37	September 16, 1997	Face/Off	16,953,936		
38	September 23, 1997	Contact	13,304,376		
39	September 30, 1997	Face/Off	9,134,100	Face/Off returned to number one in its third week of release	
40	October 7, 1997	My Best Friend's Wedding	20,119,356		
41	October 14, 1997	My Best Friend's Wedding	17,774,900		
42	October 21, 1997	Le Pari	34,739,705		
43	October 28, 1997	The Lost World: Jurassic Park	68,874,589		
44	November 4, 1997	The Lost World: Jurassic Park	47,219,604		
45	November 11, 1997	Bean	28,737,919	Bean reached number one in its second week of release	
46	November 18, 1997	Alien Resurrection	38,906,093		
47	November 25, 1997	Alien Resurrection	21,362,469		
48	December 2, 1997	Hercules	25,981,102		
49	December 9, 1997	Hercules	21,685,467		
50	December 16, 1997	Hercules	19,300,000		
51	December 23, 1997	Tomorrow Never Dies	41,417,603		
52	December 30, 1997	Tomorrow Never Dies	36,526,118		

== See also ==
- List of French films of 1997
- Lists of box office number-one films
