= Philippine Leroy-Beaulieu =

French actress (born 1963)

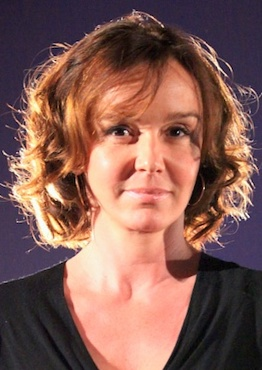
- Leroy-Beaulieu in 2011
- Born: 25 April 1963 (age 63); Boulogne-Billancourt, France
- Occupation: Actress
- Years active: 1983–present

Philippine Leroy-Beaulieu (French pronunciation: [filipin ləʁwa boljø]; born 25 April 1963) is a French actress. She is the daughter of actor Philippe Leroy and model Françoise Laurent. She made her screen debut in the 1983 comedy-drama film Surprise Party, before starring in the 1985 comedy film Three Men and a Cradle. She received a nomination for the César Award for Most Promising Actress for the latter role.

Leroy-Beaulieu has played leading and supporting roles in more than 50 movies. In recent years, she played the title character in the RTBF crime comedy series Agathe Koltès (2016–2019); in 2020 she began starring as Sylvie Grateau in the Netflix comedy-drama series Emily in Paris.

== Life and career ==
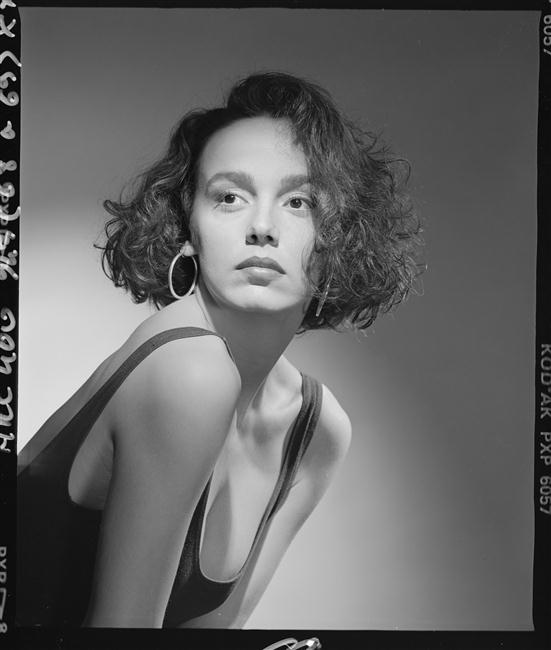
Leroy-Beaulieu in 1988

Leroy-Beaulieu was born in Boulogne-Billancourt. After spending her childhood in Rome, Italy, where her father, Philippe Leroy, worked in the local film industry, she went to Paris at 16 to study drama against the advice of her parents; her father especially tried to keep her from pursuing a career that followed in his footsteps but was unsuccessful. After appearing on the stage, Leroy-Beaulieu made her screen début in Roger Vadim's 1983 comedy-drama film Surprise Party. The following year, she played Fauve Mistral in the 1984 mini-series version of Judith Krantz's novel Mistral's Daughter.

In 1985, Leroy-Beaulieu played her first major screen role (and earned a nomination for the César Award for Most Promising Actress), playing the distraught mother in the Academy Award for Best Foreign Film-nominated comedy Trois hommes et un couffin (Three Men and a Cradle). The success of Coline Serreau's comedy helped her film career and a string of parts in costume films followed such films as Andrzej Wajda's Les Possédés in 1988, Philippe Le Guay's Les Deux Fragonard, and Robert Enrico's and Richard T. Heffron's La Révolution française (Mademoiselle Leroy-Beaulieu acted out the role of Charlotte Corday in the latter production), whose release in 1989 was timed to coincide with celebrations for the bi-centenary of the 1789 Revolution.

Leroy-Beaulieu starred in the title role of the French film Natalia, which was screened at the 1988 Cannes Film Festival. The following years, she acted in a various European movies, notable A Soul Split in Two (1993), Neuf mois (1994), Un eroe borghese (1995), Vatel (2000), and Two Brothers (2004). On television, she played Catherine Barneville in the comedy series, Call My Agent! (2015–18), and starred as a lead character in the detective series, Agathe Koltès (2016–19). In 2020, she began starring as Sylvie Grateau in the Netflix comedy-drama series, Emily in Paris. In 2022, she appeared as Monique Ritz, widow of Charles Ritz in the episode of Netflix period drama series, The Crown.

In April 2025, Leroy-Beaulieu was announced as a brand ambassador for L'Oréal Paris’ Age Perfect Collagen Expert skin-care line in France, part of the company’s campaign to promote “ageless beauty”.

Philippine Leroy-Beaulieu has a daughter named Taïs with her partner, director Richard Bean.

== Political engagements ==
For the 2002 French presidential election, she publicly expressed her support for Noël Mamère, the candidate of the Green Party in an opinion piece published in the newspaper La Croix.

== Filmography ==
=== Film ===
Year	Title	Role	Notes
1983	Surprise Party	Anne Lambert	
1985	Three Men and a Cradle	Sylvia	Nominated — César Award for Most Promising Actress
1987	Aria		Segment "Les Boréades"
1987	Flag	Fanny	
1988	Dandin	La tragédienne	
1988	The Possessed	Lisa	
1988	Camomille	Camille Renaudin	
1988	Natalia	Natalia Gronska	Amiens International Film Festival for Best Actress
1989	Les deux Fragonard	Marianne	
1989	La Révolution française	Charlotte Corday	
1991	Les clés du paradis	Marie	
1992	Coupable d'innocence ou quand la raison dort	Jeanne Eberlen	
1993	A Soul Split in Two	Miriam	
1993	Petits travaux tranquilles	Béatrice	
1994	Neuf mois	Mathilde	
1995	Un eroe borghese	Annalori Ambrosoli	
1995	L'année Juliette	Stéphanie	
1995	Jefferson in Paris	Head and Heart Game	
1995	Le nez au vent	Clémentine	
1996	La Belle Verte	Florence	
1996	Je n'en ferai pas un drame	Lily	
1996	Hercule et Sherlock	Marie	
1998	La voie est libre	Jeanne	
1998	TGV	Sylvia	
2000	Vatel	Anne Geneviève de Bourbon	
2003	18 Ans après	Sylvia	
2004	Two Brothers	Mrs. Mathilda Normandin	
2005	Trois couples en quête d'orages	Pascale	
2006	Love and Other Disasters	Daphne Spring	
2006	La sombra de nadie	Julia	
2009	Three Days With the Family	Joëlle	
2014	Les Trois Frères, le retour	Banquière Pascal	
2015	Graziella		
2016	Eternity	Valentine's mother	
2016	Père fils thérapie!	Nicole Perronet	
2018	Lola et ses frères	Sabine	
2020	De Gaulle	Hélène de Portes	
2020	Papi Sitter	Vivianne	
2025	Colours of Time	Sarah Bernhardt	
2026	100 Days	Asa Frieberg Klink	

=== Television ===
Year	Title	Role	Notes
1984	Mistral's Daughter	Fauve Mistral	Miniseries
1984	Série noire	Clarissa	Episode: "Neige à Capri
1987	La maison piège	Virginie	Television film
1989	Mon dernier rêve sera pour vous		Miniseries
1993	Meutre avec préméditation: Récidive	Janson	Television film
1993	Jules Ferry	Eugénie Ferry	Television film
1994	Les enfants du faubourg	Rosa	Television film
1994	L'île aux mômes	Florence	Television film
1997	La vérité est un vilain défaut	Isabelle	Television film
1998	Mes enfants étrangers	Pat	Television film
1998	Jeanne et le loup	Jeanne	Television film
2000	Petit Ben	Claire	Television film
2000	Sandra et les siens	Sandra Villiers	Television film
2003	Écoute, Nicolas...	Lorraine	Television film
2005	Vénus & Apollon	Muriel	Episode: "Soin homo sapiens"
2005	Commissaire Valence	Sophie Leroux	Episode: "Vengeances"
2008	Le juge est une femme	Virginie Gaetner	Episode: "À coeur et à sang"
2009-2012	Ma femme, ma fille, 2 bébés	Emma	4 episodes
2013	Camping Paradis	Anna Lavezzi	Episode: "Dancing Camping"
2014	Rosemary's Baby	Mrs. Fontaine	Miniseries
2017	Scènes de ménages	Isabelle	Episode: "Enfin à la montagne!"
2015-2018	Call My Agent!	Catherine Barneville	16 episodes
2016-2019	Agathe Koltès	Agathe Koltès	10 episodes
2020	Mirage (miniseries)	Jeanne	5 episodes
2020–present	Emily in Paris	Sylvie Grateau	Series regular
2022	The Crown	Monique Ritz	Episode: "Mou Mou"
