= Pascal Légitimus =

French actor, comedian and theatre director

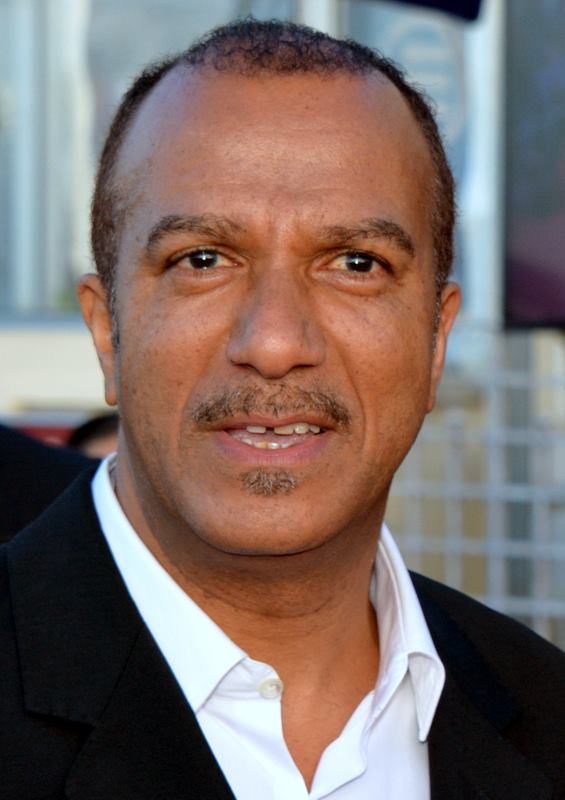
- Légitimus at the 2016 Cabourg Film Festival
- Born: 13 March 1959 (age 67); Paris, France
- Occupations: Actor, comedian, screenwriter, director
- Years active: 1981–present

Pascal Légitimus (born 13 March 1959) is a French actor, comedian and theatre director. He is a member of the well-known French comedy band Les Inconnus.

== Personal life ==
He is the son of an Armenian theater seamstress, Madeleine Kambourian, and of an Antillean actor, Théo Légitimus. He is also the grandson of Martinican comedian Darling Légitimus and the nephew of television producer Gésip Légitimus.

== Theatre ==
=== Actor ===
Year	Title	Author	Director	Notes
1981	À Memphis, il y a un homme d'une force prodigieuse	Jean Audureau	Henri Ronse	
1982	Les Enfants de Zombie	Georges Desportes	Benjamin Jules Rosette	
1987	Au secours… Tout va bien !	Les Inconnus	Les Inconnus	
1989–90	Au secours… Tout va mieux !	Les Inconnus	Jacques Décombe	Molière Award for Best Comedy
1991	Isabelle a les yeux bleus	Les Inconnus	Jacques Décombe	
1993	Le Nouveau Spectacle	Les Inconnus	Jacques Décombe	
2001	The Wedding	Anton Tchekhov	Pascal Légitimus	
2003	Nuit d'ivresse	Josiane Balasko	Josiane Balasko	
2008–10	Plus si affinités	Mathilda May & Pascal Légitimus	Gil Galliot	
2011–15	Alone Man Show	Pascal Légitimus	Gil Galliot	

=== Director ===
Year	Title	Author	Artist	Notes
1993	L'avis des bêtes - Une certaine idée de la France	Élie & Dieudonné	Élie & Dieudonné	Théâtre du Splendid Saint-Martin
1995	Mon spectacle s'appelle revient	Pierre Palmade	Pierre Palmade	Théâtre du Gymnase Marie Bell
1995	Cette nuit ou jamais	Anne-Marie Étienne	Anne-Marie Étienne	Théâtre du Lucernaire
1997	Enfin gentil	Laurent Ruquier	Laurent Ruquier	Théâtre Grévin
1998	Encore gentil ?	Laurent Ruquier	Laurent Ruquier	Casino de Paris
1998-99	Kavanagh !	Anthony Kavanagh	Anthony Kavanagh	
1998-99	Pas si simple	Arnaud Gidoin	Arnaud Gidoin	Petit Palais des Glaces
2000	Gentil pour la dernière fois ?	Laurent Ruquier	Laurent Ruquier	Théâtre de Paris
2001–02	Stéphane Rousseau vous fait l'humour	Stéphane Rousseau	Stéphane Rousseau	Bataclan
2002	Les 2BN	Les 2BN	Les 2BN	Théâtre du Point-Virgule
2003	Cyrano 2	Cédric Clodic	Michel Vignaud	Théâtre du Splendid Saint-Martin
2003–04	C'est Clair Clair	Clair Jaz	Clair Jaz	Théâtre du Splendid Saint-Martin
2004	Le Clan des divorcées	Alil Vardar	Claire Gérard, Alil Vardar & Ève Angeli	La Grande Comédie
2004	La Routine	Arnaud Gidoin	Arnaud Gidoin	Théâtre Trévise
2007	En chair et en noce	Pascal Légitimus & Didier Gustin	Didier Gustin	Comédie-Caumartin
2009	Métronome	Cinq de Cœur	Cinq de Cœur	Théâtre Le Ranelagh
2011–12	Réaction en chaînes	Smaïn & Jean-Marc Longval	Smaïn	Théâtre Rive Gauche

== Filmography ==
Year	Title	Role	Director	Notes
1982	Anton Muze	Ghislain	Philippe Setbon	Short
1982–86	Le Petit Théâtre de Bouvard	Various	Various	Also Writer
1984	Pinot simple flic	Tom	Gérard Jugnot	
1985	Le téléphone sonne toujours deux fois!!	Blacky	Jean-Pierre Vergne	Also Writer
1985	Le 4ème pouvoir		Serge Leroy	
1986	Black Mic Mac	The CRS	Thomas Gilou	
1987	L'oeil au beurre noir	Denis	Serge Meynard	Nominated - César Award for Most Promising Actor
1990–93	La télé des inconnus	Various	Bernard Flament, Jean-Paul Jaud & Gérard Pullicino	TV series (7 episodes); Also Writer; 7 d'Or for Best Broadcast - Special Class
1991	Génial, mes parents divorcent!	Stadium keeper	Patrick Braoudé	
1992	Siméon	Philomene Junior	Euzhan Palcy	
1993	Paranoïa		Frédéric Forestier & Stéphane Gateau	Short
1994	Neuf mois	The gynecologist	Patrick Braoudé	
1994	Lumière noire	The Bricole	Med Hondo	
1995	The Three Brothers	Pascal Latour	Didier Bourdon & Bernard Campan	
1997	The Bet	A guest	Didier Bourdon & Bernard Campan	
1997	L'Homme idéal	Stéphane	Xavier Gélin	Also Writer
1997	Abus de méfiance	The Director	Pascal Légitimus	Short; Also Director & Writer
1998	L'annonce faite à Marius	Marius	Harmel Sbraire	
1998	Jeudi 12	Patrick Dubreuil	Patrick Vidal	TV movie Also Writer
1998–2003	Crimes en série	Thomas Berthier	Patrick Dewolf & Pierre Joassin	TV series (11 episodes)
1999	Tôt ou tard	Christian	Anne-Marie Etienne	
1999	Cas clinique	The dentist	Olivier Laubacher	Short
1999	Evamag	Jean-Chris	Agnès Boury	TV series (1 episode)
2000	Antilles sur Seine	Various	Pascal Légitimus	Also Director, Writer & Composer
2000	Oncle Paul	Uncle Paul	Gérard Vergez	TV movie
2001	Les Rois mages	Saint Caspar	Didier Bourdon & Bernard Campan	
2001	Un vol, la nuit	Marco	Olivier Laubacher	Short
2003	The Car Keys	Himself	Laurent Baffie	
2003	Le pharmacien de garde	Tony	Jean Veber	
2003	Toutes les filles sont folles	Etam Manager	Pascale Pouzadoux	
2003	Les amateurs	Jimmy	Martin Valente	
2004	Nord-Plage		José Hayot	
2004	Les cascadeurs		Laurent Germain-Maury	TV movie Writer & Producer
2004	Joe Pollox et les mauvais esprits	Paul Francoeur	Jérôme Foulon	TV movie
2004	Un homme presque idéal	Vincent	Christiane Lehérissey	TV movie
2005	Quartier V.I.P.	René	Laurent Firode	
2005	Saint-Jacques... La Mecque	Guy	Coline Serreau	
2005	L'homme qui voulait passer à la télé	Fabien	Amar Arhab & Fabrice Michelin	TV movie Also Producer, Writer & Composer
2005	La famille Zappon		Amar Arhab & Fabrice Michelin	TV movie Writer
2006	Madame Irma	Ludovic	Didier Bourdon & Yves Fajnberg	
2006	Du goût et des couleurs	Olivier Desroses	Michaëla Watteaux	TV movie Also Writer
2006–09	Les tricheurs	Alexandre Toussaint	Benoît d'Aubert & Laurent Carcélès	TV series (3 episodes)
2007	Demandez la permission aux enfants	Francis	Eric Civanyan	
2007	New délire	Bobby	Eric Le Roch	Also Writer
2007	Qui va à la chasse...	New Surgeon	Olivier Laubacher	TV movie Also Producer
2008	J'ai pensé à vous tous les jours	Bernard	Jérôme Foulon	TV movie
2009	Park Benches	The customer Beuck	Bruno Podalydès	
2009	Cathy	David	Elsa Barrère	Short
2009	Le mirage		Fabien Pruvot	Short
2010	Camping paradis	Sam Love	Bruno Garcia	TV series (1 episode)
2010	Les virtuoses	Commander Vargas	Claude-Michel Rome	TV series (1 episode)
2010	Hero Corp	Mayor Favreau	Simon Astier	TV series (5 episodes)
2010–12	Ma femme, ma fille, 2 bébés	Antoine	Vincent Monnet, Patrick Volson & Guila Braoudé	TV series (4 episodes)
2011	Prochainement sur vos écrans	André Marie Jeanne de Basse-Terre	Fabrice Maruca	Short
2011	Bien au-delà	Paco	Julien Allary	Short
2011	Ripoux anonymes	Henri	Claude Zidi	TV series (1 episode)
2012	Mince alors!	Freddy	Charlotte de Turckheim	
2012	Bienvenue aux acteurs anonymes	Himself	Mathias Gomis	Short
2013	Le vivant-mort	Grégory Bonchamp	Maxime Ropars	Short
2013	Direction générale de la VDM	The director	Fouad Benhammou	TV series (14 episodes)
2014	Les Trois Frères, le retour	Pascal Latour	Didier Bourdon & Bernard Campan	Also Producer
2014	Frères d'armes		Rachid Bouchareb	TV mini-series
2014	Scènes de ménages	Patrick	Francis Duquet	TV series (2 episodes)
2015	The Little Prince	The Policeman	Mark Osborne	
2015	Of Men and Mice		Gonzague Legout	Short; Producer
2015	Rose et le soldat	Gustave	Jean-Claude Barny & Jean-Claude Flamand	TV movie
2015	Accusé	Martin Forestier	Didier Bivel	TV series (1 episode)
2015	Caïn	Allard	Thierry Petit	TV series (1 episode)
2016	La Loi de la jungle	Duplex	Antonin Peretjatko	

== Dubbing ==
Year	Title	Role	Actor	Director	Notes
1986	Platoon	Francis	Corey Glover	Oliver Stone	
1986	Heartbreak Ridge	Corporal "Stitch" Jones	Mario Van Peebles	Clint Eastwood	
1986	L.A. Law	Andrew Taylor	Mario Van Peebles	Gregory Hoblit, Jan Eliasberg & Ben Bolt	TV series (4 episodes)
1988	Colors	T-Bone	Damon Wayans	Dennis Hopper	
1988	Sonny Spoon	Sonny Spoon	Mario Van Peebles	Several	TV series (15 episodes)
1990	Look Who's Talking Too	Eddie	Damon Wayans	Amy Heckerling	
1990	King of New York	Joey Dalesio	Paul Calderón	Abel Ferrara	
1991	New Jack City	Stone	Mario Van Peebles	Mario Van Peebles	
1992	Malcolm X	Shorty	Spike Lee	Spike Lee	
1993	Only the Strong	Louis Stevens	Mark Dacascos	Sheldon Lettich	
1993	Poetic Justice	Lucky	Tupac Shakur	John Singleton	
1993	Cool Runnings	Sanka Coffie	Doug E. Doug	Jon Turteltaub	
1995	Clockers	Ronald 'Strike' Dunham	Mekhi Phifer	Spike Lee	
1996	Don't Be a Menace to South Central; While Drinking Your Juice in the Hood	Ashtray	Shawn Wayans	Paris Barclay	
1997	Nothing to Lose	Terrance Paul "T-Paul" Davidson	Martin Lawrence	Steve Oedekerk	
1998-2000	Martial Law	Terrell Parker	Arsenio Hall	Several	TV series (36 episodes)
1999	Candyman 3: Day of the Dead	Miguel Velasco	Mark Adair-Rios	Turi Meyer	
2000-01	Rude Awakening	Marcus Adams	Mario Van Peebles	Several	TV series (20 episodes)
2002	Barbershop	Jimmy James	Sean Patrick Thomas	Tim Story	
2003	Charlie's Angels: Full Throttle	Jimmy Bosley	Bernie Mac	McG	
2006	Open Season	Boog	Martin Lawrence	Jill Culton, Roger Allers & Anthony Stacchi	
2007-09	Damages	Agent Randall Harrison	Mario Van Peebles	Several	TV series (11 episodes)
2008	Open Season 2	Boog	Mike Epps	Matthew O'Callaghan & Todd Wilderman	
2010	Shrek Forever After	Cookie the Ogre	Craig Robinson	Mike Mitchell	
