= Les Rois mages =

2001 film by Didier Bourdon

The three magis
- Directed by: Didier Bourdon; Bernard Campan
- Written by: Didier Bourdon; Bernard Campan; Olivier Rabourdin
- Produced by: Claude Berri; Sarim Fassi; Pierre Grunstein
- Starring: Didier Bourdon; Bernard Campan; Pascal Légitimus
- Distributed by: Pathé Distribution
- Release date: 2001
- Running time: 102 min
- Country: France
- Language: French
- Budget: $11.7 million
- Box office: $14 million

Les Rois mages (or The Three Magis, its unofficial English title) is a French comedy film released in 2001, made by Bernard Campan and Didier Bourdon. They also star in the film, playing the roles of Balthazar and Melchior respectively. Pascal Légitimus, the third member of the humorist group Les Inconnus, also stars in the film as Caspar.

== Cast ==
- Didier Bourdon as Balthazar
- Bernard Campan as Melchior
- Pascal Légitimus as Saint Caspar
- Eriq Ebouaney as Babar
- Jean Dell as The receptionist
- Didier Flamand

== Synopsis ==
The Biblical Magi find themselves in Paris in modern times, and become a media sensation.
