= Surprise Party (film) =

1983 French comedy-drama film by Roger Vadim

- Directed by: Roger Vadim
- Starring: Caroline Cellier
- Cinematography: Georges Barsky
- Music by: Michel Magne; Sergio Renucci
- Release date: 1983
- Country: France
- Language: French
- Box office: $2.9 million

Surprise Party is a 1983 French comedy-drama film directed by Roger Vadim.

== Cast ==
- Caroline Cellier as Lisa Bourget
- Philippine Leroy-Beaulieu as Anne Lambert
- Christian Vadim as Christian Bourget
- Michel Duchaussoy as François Lambert
- Mylène Demongeot as Geneviève Lambert
- Maurice Ronet as Georges Levesques
- Pascale Roberts as Madame Gisèle
- Yves Barsacq as Brigadier
- Michel Godin as Marco
- François Perrot as Armando
