= Les Inconnus =

French comedy group

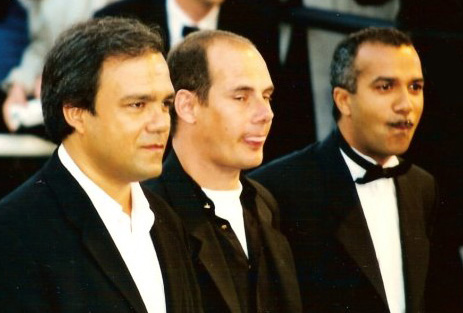
Didier Bourdon, Bernard Campan and Pascal Légitimus (from left to right) at the 1996 Cannes Film Festival

Les Inconnus (French pronunciation: [lez‿ɛ̃kɔny]; lit. 'The Unknowns') are a French trio of comedians consisting of Didier Bourdon, Bernard Campan and Pascal Légitimus. While their first successes were on stage, they are most famous for their satirical sketch comedy television show La Télé des Inconnus, which premiered in 1990 and remained popular throughout the early 1990s. Following their television success, the group went on to produce music and movies, most of them written and directed by Bourdon and Campan. After the movie Les Trois Frères in 1995, the trio encountered contract problems with their manager Paul Lederman, which caused the group to split up, though they reformed in the early 2000s. There have been several films released since then that have featured at least two former members together.

== History ==
The comedy troupe that would become Les Inconnus was formed in 1984. At its founding, the group had five members (Didier Bourdon, Bernard Campan, Pascal Légitimus, Seymour Brussel, and Smaïn) and was known as "Les Cinq" (The Five). Les Cinq starred in the 1985 movie Le Téléphone Sonne Toujours Deux Fois ("The Telephone Always Rings Twice"), but shortly afterward Smaïn left the group to pursue his career as a solo act. Down to four members, the group changed its name to "Les Quatre Quarts" (a pun in French: literally meaning "The Four Quarters," it is also the word for pound cake). In 1986 they met a new manager, Paul Lederman, who began to lead the troupe to larger and larger venues. At about this time the group's name was changed to "Les Inconnus" (The Unknowns). After hosting a radio show on Europe 1 from 1987 to 1988, Les Inconnus lost another member, Seymour Brussel. They eventually reached national fame with their 1989 stage comic show "Au secours, tout va mieux!" (literally "Help, things are getting better!").

In 1990, the three remaining members of the group premiered their sketch comedy television show, "La Télé des Inconnus". The show, which ran for two years on Antenne 2 (now France 2), was highly successful, and propelled the group to stardom throughout France. Their sketches parodied a number of French cultural icons, highly popular at the time, including musicians Richard Clayderman, Mano Negra, Indochine, Didier Barbelivien, Florent Pagny, Jean-Pierre François, and Patrick Bruel, as well as international stars like Sylvester Stallone (in the unlikely role of Jesus Christ in a mock film trailer), Jean-Claude Van Damme (a recurring character in unlikely roles like Jean Valjean from Les Misérables or Vicomte de Valmont from Les Liaisons dangereuses), Al Pacino, Robert De Niro; and television shows Club Dorothée, Bioman, Star Trek or Santa Barbara. They also satirized French politicians, police, trade unions, contemporary art, fashion design, advertising, various television programs, and society at large. The program won two 7 d'Or (the top French television award), and a video clip from the show, "Auteuil, Neuilly, Passy", won two Victoires de la Musique. Their most famous sketch is probably "Télémagouilles" with its gimmick "Stéphanie de Monaco"; this sketch is a parody of most of TV games.

In 1995, Les Inconnus made their first film in ten years, Les Trois Frères ("The Three Brothers"). The film was highly successful, winning the César Award for best début, but due to contract disputes with their manager Paul Lederman, the group was forced to disband after the film's release. Bourdon and Campan starred in two other movies together, Le Pari ("The Bet"), L'Extraterrestre ("The Extraterrestrial"), before Légitimus rejoined them for their final film together, Les Rois Mages (The Magi), in 2001. Only Bourdon and Légitimus starred in Madame Irma in 2006. They were reunited in 2014 for Les Trois Frères: Le Retour, a sequel to the 1995 film, but it was a critical and commercial failure.

== Filmography ==
- 1985 – Le Téléphone Sonne Toujours Deux Fois (included Seymour Brussel and Smaïn)
- 1995 – Les Trois Frères
- 1997 – Le Pari (excluded Pascal Légitimus)
- 2000 – L'Extraterrestre (excluded Pascal Légitimus)
- 2001 – Les Rois mages
- 2006 – Madame Irma (excluded Bernard Campan)
- 2014 – Les Trois Frères: Le Retour

== Selected discography ==
- "Auteuil, Neuilly, Passy (rap BCBG)"
- "Biouman" (parody of the children television show Club Dorothée, which featured many Japanese animation and live action series, Bioman being singled-out as one of the most emblematic)
- "C'est ton destin" (parody of rap)
- "Rap tout (vampire)" (parody of rap on the subject of taxes)
- "Un chagrin d'amour" (parody of "À toutes les filles")
- "Vice et versa" (parody of French new wave bands with complicated yet apparently nonsensical lyrics and a style-over-substance propensity)
- "C'est toi que je t'aime"
- "Isabelle a les yeux bleus" (parody of Partenaire Particulier [music and lyrics] and Indochine [aesthetics])
