= J'ai peur d'oublier =

- Screenplay by: Catherine Ramberg; Fabienne Piel
- Directed by: Élisabeth Rappeneau
- Starring: Clémentine Célarié; Daniel Russo; Patrick Catalifo
- Country of origin: France
- Original language: French

Production
- Running time: 90 minutes

Original release
- Network: France 2
- Release: 21 September 2011

J'ai peur d'oublier (lit. 'I'm afraid to forget') is a French made-for-television drama film directed by Élisabeth Rappeneau and broadcast for the first time on 21 September 2011 on France 2. The film received a nomination at the Monte-Carlo Television Festival in 2012 for best television film. The film also showed at the 2011 Festival de la Fiction in La Rochelle.

== Plot ==
Entrepreneur and mother of two children, Fabienne, a beautiful 45-year-old woman, learns that she is precociously diagnosed with Alzheimer's disease. She precipitately leaves her husband Patrick to follow the wanderings of Paul, a lost man who lives of small thefts. A roadtrip of two days begins through Camargue. Like sand in her hand, Fabienne feels her life slipping away. While that escape confronts them to their mutual anguishes, Patrick and his children go looking for her. This quest obliges them to explore their own story, their resentments and their unsaids. Vulnerable and infinitely touching, Fabienne reveals herself and confesses little by little her distress to Paul. Several intimate flashbacks define her increasing illness, forcing her to go back to a traumatic episode when she was thirteen.

== Cast ==
- Clémentine Célarié as Fabienne
- Daniel Russo as Paul
- Patrick Catalifo as Patrick
- Geneviève Fontanel as Fabienne's mother
- Juliet Lemonnier as Harmonie
- Hugo Brunswick as Bruno
