= Neuf mois =

- Directed by: Patrick Braoudé
- Written by: Patrick Braoudé; Daniel Russo
- Produced by: Anne François; Christophe Lambert
- Starring: Philippine Leroy-Beaulieu; Patrick Braoudé; Catherine Jacob; Daniel Russo
- Cinematography: Jean-Yves Le Mener
- Edited by: Georges Klotz
- Music by: Jacques Davidovici
- Distributed by: AFMD
- Release date: 2 February 1994
- Running time: 110 minutes
- Country: France
- Language: French
- Budget: $2.4 million
- Box office: $6.9 million

Neuf mois, whose title translates into English as Nine Months, is a 1994 romantic comedy film starring Philippine Leroy-Beaulieu, Catherine Jacob, Patrick Braoudé (who also directed and co-wrote the film), Daniel Russo, Patrick Bouchitey, and Pascal Légitimus. The movie resulted in the 1995 US remake Nine Months.

== Plot ==
Samuel is a psychoanalyst. All day long, he sees patients who express grievances, particularly rebellious teenagers who despise their parents. This has led him to have a dim view of the idea of becoming a parent. That is when his girlfriend, Mathilde, tells him that she is pregnant with his child. Terrified of having a child and being a parent, Samuel sees Mathilde's pregnancy as a nightmare. The advice of Samuel's friend, Marc, a womanizer and a bachelor, does not help Mathilde's anxiety.

On the other hand, Dominique, Marc's sister, and her husband, Georges, already have three daughters, and when they learn Dominique is pregnant for the fourth time, they take it in stride. The two couples experience the ups and downs of pregnancy and along the way, build stronger bonds of friendship.

== Cast ==
- Philippine Leroy-Beaulieu as Mathilde
- Patrick Braoudé as Samuel
- Catherine Jacob as Dominique
- Daniel Russo as Georges
- Patrick Bouchitey as Marc
- Pascal Légitimus as The gynecologist
- Michèle Garcia as The nurse
- Steve Suissa as Ambulance man
