= Frequent Death =

- Theatrical release poster
- Directed by: Élisabeth Rappeneau
- Written by: Jacques Audiard; Élisabeth Rappeneau
- Based on: When the Dark Man Calls by Stuart M. Kaminsky
- Produced by: Danièle Delorme; Yves Robert
- Starring: Catherine Deneuve; André Dussollier; Martin Lamotte
- Cinematography: William Lubtchansky
- Edited by: Martine Barraqué
- Music by: Philippe Gall
- Production companies: Les Productions de la Guéville; Acteurs Auteurs Associés
- Distributed by: Acteurs Auteurs Associés
- Release date: 30 March 1988
- Running time: 103 minutes
- Country: France
- Language: French
- Box office: $3.6 million

Frequent Death (original title: Fréquence meurtre) is a 1988 French crime film directed by Élisabeth Rappeneau. It is based on Stuart M. Kaminsky's 1983 novel When the Dark Man Calls.

== Plot ==
Jeanne Quester is a single mother. As a certified psychologist, she works two jobs. During daytime she does social work, but at night she is a radio personality who provides live advice for needy callers. Due to the success of her radio show, she receives the offer to work for TV.

Suddenly she is menaced by alienating, enigmatic calls whenever she is on air. Moreover, a stranger manages to secretly access her flat and when Jeanne returns there, she finds her daughter's parrot killed. Later, she discovers somebody has attacked her car. Jeanne turns to her brother Frank, who is a policeman. Frank finds out that the convicted murderer of their parents was released just recently. Jeanne is afraid the murderer is out for vengeance.

Eventually she finds the alleged murderer himself brutally killed in her flat. Even so, the more and more openly threatening calls continue and finally her daughter gets kidnapped by the mysterious caller. Jeanne meets the kidnapper who turns out being the real murderer of her parents. He discloses his identity and tells her what really happened back then. When Jeanne can't comply with his demands, he decides to kill her.

== Cast ==
- Catherine Deneuve as Jeanne Quester
- André Dussollier as Frank Quester
- Martin Lamotte as Simon Lieberman
- Étienne Chicot as Roger
- Inès Claye as Pauline
- Madeleine Marie as Ida Faber
- Philippe Lehembre as Faber
- Daniel Rialet as Fred Bastin
- Alain Stern as MacGregor
- Martine Chevallier as Marie
- Annie Mercier as Madame Fremont
