= The Three Brothers (film) =

- Directed by: Didier Bourdon; Bernard Campan
- Written by: Didier Bourdon; Bernard Campan
- Produced by: Claude Berri
- Starring: Didier Bourdon; Bernard Campan; Pascal Légitimus
- Cinematography: Alain Choquart
- Edited by: Gerard Klotz
- Music by: Olivier Bernard; Didier Bourdon
- Distributed by: AMLF
- Release date: 13 December 1995
- Running time: 105 min
- Country: France
- Language: French
- Budget: $7.2 million
- Box office: $46 million (France)

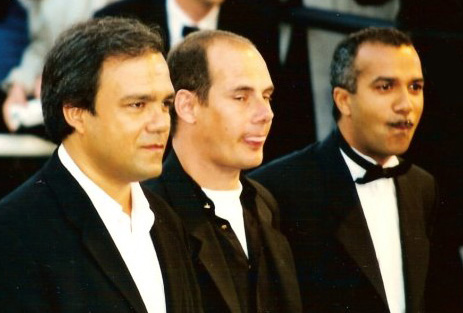
Didier Bourdon, Bernard Campan and Pascal Légitimus

The Three Brothers (French: Les Trois Frères) is a 1995 French comedy film written, directed by and starring Didier Bourdon and Bernard Campan alongside their Les Inconnus partner Pascal Légitimus.

The film won the award for Best Debut at the César Awards in 1996.

== Plot ==
Three brothers meet each other for the first time after their mother's death. Believing that they will inherit her fortune, they quickly spend their money. However, when the inheritance does not transpire, the brothers become closer as they try to work out what to do.

== Casting ==
- Didier Bourdon: Didier Latour
- Bernard Campan: Bernard Latour
- Pascal Légitimus: Pascal Latour
- Antoine du Merle: Michael Rossignol
- Anne Jacquemin: Marie
- Marine Jolivet: Christine Rossignol
- Annick Alane: Geneviève Rougemont
- Pierre Meyrand: Charles-Henri Rougemont
- Isabelle Gruault: Marie-Ange Rougemont
- Marie-Christine Adam: Sandra
- Bernard Farcy: Monsieur Steven
- Élie Semoun: Brice
- Henri Courseaux: Mᵉ Larieux
- Jean-François Pastout: Mᵉ Gonzales
- Yolande Moreau & Bruno Lochet: Owners of the PMU bar
- Jacky Nercessian: host of the Millionnaire TV show
- Pascal N'Zonzi: the recruiter
- Chick Ortega: head cook

== Reception ==
It was the highest-grossing French film of the year with a gross of $46 million.
