= Samuel Sené =

French theatre and opera director, conductor, composer

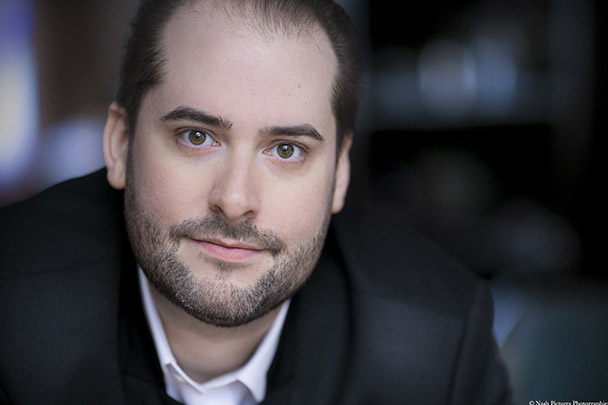
Samuel Sené

Samuel Sené is a French theatre director, musical director, pianist, and conductor.

He won four French Musical Theatre Awards (TCM): Best Director and Best Author for his musicals Comédiens! in 2018 and L'Homme de Schrödinger in 2019.

== Early life and education ==
Samuel Sené obtained his baccalaureate at the age of 14. In 1999, when he was 17, Sené entered the École normale supérieure de Cachan where he studied mathematics. After his time at the École normale supérieure de Cachan he obtained the French mathematics aggregation (agrégation de mathématiques). He thus became the youngest agrégé in France in this discipline.

Sené first studied music at the Conservatoire d'Orléans and then at the Music school in Saint-Maur, where he won first prizes in piano, accompaniment and conducting.

== Career ==
He first worked in Paris, for the théâtre national de l'Opéra-Comique and Châtelet, then Brazil with the São Paulo State orchestras. He has conducted numerous operas and operettas, such as Carmen, Orphée aux Enfers, Hamlet, La belle Hélène, Death in Venice, Normaand others. He has also conducted many popular events, including the official Star Wars at the Grand Rex and the Jules Verne Festival concerts.

Samuel composed the opera Le dernier jour which was selected and subsidised by the Fonds de Création Lyrique de la société des auteurs et compositeurs dramatiques (SACD). He wrote the arrangements of Richard Wagner's Der fliegende Holländer and Mozart's Don Giovanni for the Nouvelle Troupe Lyrique. He composed the music for the ballet Derviche mon amour, and the incidental music for plays such as Romeo and Juliet and Dom Juan. His versatility also led him into the field of film music and variety: he worked as an arranger for Sabine Paturel, pop-symphonic shows, universal audiovisual programmes, etc.

Samuel then focussed on Anglo-Saxon musicals and was the musical director for Fame, Fiddler on the Roof, Rendez-vous, West Side Story, Next Thing You Know, Oliver!, Fantasmes de demoiselles, and, Into the Woods (on tour in France 2018–19). He is also the educational director of the Musidrama workshops. Co-founder of the West End Frenchies, a federation of Francophile musical theatre workers in London. He directed several of their Voulez-vous sing with me tonight cabarets, as well as the musical Pinot at the Colour House Theatre, also in London.

His dual musical and theatrical training has enabled Samuel to direct operas (Tosca, Orphée et Eurydice, Pagliacci...), musical shows (Contes sans frontière at the Théâtre des Célestins, the 2008–2009 editions of the Cérémonies des Marius, the 2012 and 2013 editions of the Ville en lumières Festival in the city of Troyes), musical theatre creations such as Légendes parisiennes, #hashtags, Flop, Jack l'ombre de Whitechapel, and Week-end! and theatre pieces such as The Lesson by Ionesco at the Théâtre Mouffetard and the Lucernaire centre theatres. In 2018, he created the musical Comédiens! which successfully ran at the Théâtre de la Huchette and received five awards including for best libretto, best show, and best direction. Then he wrote and directed L'homme de Schrödinger and Contre-temps.

The COVID-19 pandemic pushed Samuel to go off the beaten track, and he directed the very first French virtual choir, The Show Must Go On, which was seen more than ten million times on various platforms. He created C-o-n-t-a-c-t, a remote theatrical experience 2.0, which met with immediate success in Paris. It was soon translated into several languages and transferred to a dozen countries around the globe including the United Kingdom, Canada, Italy, He directed La flûte cyber-enchantée at the Opéra de Vichy, using a range of new video, streaming and videoconferencing technologies for a hyperconnected and interactive show.

== Theatre and musical theatre ==
=== Director ===
- 2010 : La Leçon, d'Eugène Ionesco. Théâtre Mouffetard, Théâtre Lucernaire, tournée française;
- 2013 : Ville en lumières, Créations musicales pour la ville de Troyes;
- 2014 : Légendes parisiennes, Conte musical de Raphaël Bancou, La Générale;
- 2015 : #hashtags!, théâtre transmédia musical d'Alyssa Landry et Thierry Boulanger, La Générale;
- 2016 : Flop, comédie musicale d'Alexandre Bonstein et Sinan Bertrand, musique de Patrick Laviosa. La Générale;
- 2017 : Yves Montand, sous le ciel de Paris de S. Skomorokhov, Saint-Pétersbourg et tournée en Russie.
- 2017 : Jack l'ombre de Whitechapel, comédie musicale de Guillaume Bouchède et Michel Frantz. Théâtre Trévise;
- 2018 : Week-end !, comédie musicale d'Eric Chantelauze et Raphaël Bancou, La Générale;
- 2018 : Comédiens !, de Samuel Sené, Eric Chantelauze et Raphaël Bancou. Théâtre de la Huchette,.
- 2018 : L'Homme de Schrödinger, de Samuel Sené, Eric Chantelauze et Raphael Bancou. Artistic Théâtre;
- 2018 : Un chant de Noël, d'Eric Chantelauze, Michel Frantz, Raphaël Bancou, Julien Mouchel et Vincent Merval. Artistic Théâtre;
- 2019 : Ca bouge, de Raphaël Callandreau, La Générale;
- 2019 : Anna attend l'amour, d'Elisa Ollier et Vincent Fernandel. Théâtre des Mathurins
- 2020 : c-Ω-n-t-α-c-t, de Gabrielle Jourdain, Samuel Sené et Eric Chantelauze.
- 2020 : Contre-temps, de Samuel Sené, Eric Chantelauze et Raphaël Bancou. Studio Hébertot, Artistic Théâtre, Buffon Théâtre.
- 2021 : La flûte cyber-enchantée, d'après l'opéra de Mozart et Schikaneder.

=== Musical director for musicals ===
- 2006 : Un violon sur le toit, Tournée française. Mise en scène d'Olivier Bénézech. Direction d'orchestre et directeur vocal (coach vocal et chef de chœur);
- 2008 : Fame, Théâtre Comédia, puis tournée française. Mise en scène Ned Grujic. Direction vocale et musicale;
- 2010 : Rendez-vous, Théâtre de Paris, avec Kad Merad. Mise en scène Jean-Luc Revol. Direction d'orchestre en alternance;
- 2010 : Diva Chorus, Théâtre du Châtelet. Direction du chœur pour le concert Broadway Lights;
- 2012-2014 : Le Noël Magique, Alhambra et Palais des Congrès, Paris.
- 2015 : Next Thing You Know, Tournée française. Production AMT Live. Directeur musical;
- 2015 : West End Frenchies, Londres, Directeur artistique (Cockpit Theatre, Marylebone, France Show, Bedroom Theatre...);
- 2015 : The Answering Machine, création européenne du musical d'Andy Roninson. Direction musicale;
- 2015 : La revanche de Crochet, Théâtre des Variétés, musiques de Raphaël Sanchez. Direction vocale;
- 2018 : Into the woods, Opéra de Reims, Opéra de Massy, Théâtre de la Croix-Rousse de Lyon. Mise en scène Olivier Bénézech. Directeur musical.

== Music ==
=== Operas ===
- 2001 : Carmen by Bizet, Opéra Coté Chœur (scenography and direction)
- 2002 : Orphée aux Enfers by Offenbach, Opéra Coté Chœur (scenography and direction)
- 2003 : Hamlet by Ambroise Thomas, Opéra Coté Chœur (scenography)
- 2004 : Pagliacci by Leoncavallo, Lyric'En Scène
- 2005 : Orphée et Eurydice by Gluck, La Croche Chœur
- 2005 : Tosca by Puccini, at the Grand Dôme de Villebon (scenography)
- 2010 : Death in Venice by Britten, Opéra Coté Chœur (musical director)
- 2014 : Norma by Bellini, Opéra Coté Chœur (musical director)

=== Concert conductor ===
- 2005 : Concert Star Wars officiel au Grand Rex, pour la sortie de l'épisode III
- 2006 : Concert de clotûre du Festival Jules Verne au Grand Rex
- 2012 et 2013 : Concerts symphoniques et lyriques au Brésil, avec les orchestres de l'État de São Paulo
- 2019 : Broadway in Vichy, concert d'extraits de comédies musicales à travers les époques, avec l'orchestre Musidrama, à l'Opéra de Vichy
- 2020-2024 : Bond Symphonique, Grand Rex, avec l'orchestre Colonne.

=== Compositions and arrangements ===
- Divers programmes télévisés, depuis 2005 : Le Bruno Vaigasse Show (France5), Les plus étrangères de Paris (Editions Universal), Mangez-moi (Editions Universal),...
- 2002 : Le dernier jour, d'après Le dernier jour d'un condamné de V. Hugo – Opéra lauréat du F.C.L. (Fonds de création lyrique) de la SACD.
- 2012 : Le Noël Magique, Alhambra et Palais des Congrès, Paris.
- 2014 : Derviche mon amour, spectacle chorégraphique de Kawtar Kel, Compagnie Chorésophes. Vingtième Théâtre (Paris).
- Depuis 2016 : Ecriture de diverses musiques de scène, don't Roméo et Juliette et Dom Juan, mise en scène Manon Montel.
- 2020 : Arrangements et direction de The Show Must Go On, première chorale virtuelle française en réaction au premier confinement en 2020.

== Publication ==
- Allez, on s'échauffe !, Guide technique et pratique. Volume I "Le Chant", volume II "La Voix parlée".

== Nominations and awards ==
- Winner of the Wagner200 competition, a European competition organised by the Associazione Lirica Concertistica Italiana (As.Li.Co.), for arranging and composing a reduced version of Richard Wagner's The Phantom Ship, published by Casa Ricordi;
- Winner of the Fonds de Création Lyrique de la SACD for the creation of Le dernier jour, an opera based on the work of Victor Hugo;
- Winner of the 1st prize for cultural action from the BMW Foundation, supporting the tour of Ambroise Thomas' opera Hamlet
- French Musical Theatre Awards 2018 for Comédiens! winner for best musical, direction and libretto.
- French Musical Theatre Awards 2019 for L'Homme de Schrödinger, best direction and best libretto
