= Madame Irma =

- Theatrical release poster
- Directed by: Didier Bourdon; Yves Fajnberge
- Written by: Frédéric Petitjean
- Produced by: Régine Konckier; Didier Bourdon; Yves Fajnberge
- Starring: Pascal Légitimus; Didier Bourdon; Catherine Mouchet; Arly Jover
- Cinematography: Pascal Gaubère
- Edited by: Jeanne Kef
- Music by: Olivier Bernard
- Distributed by: Mars Distribution
- Release dates: November 2006 (Sarlat Film Festival); 6 December 2006 (France)
- Running time: 90 minutes
- Country: France
- Language: French
- Budget: $10.6 million
- Box office: $4.1 million

Madame Irma is a 2006 comedy French film directed by Didier Bourdon and Yves Fajnberge and starring Didier Bourdon and Pascal Légitimus.

== Plot ==
Francis, a recently laid-off CEO, takes up dressing up as a woman Romanian fortune-teller to earn money.

== Cast ==
- Didier Bourdon : Francis / Irma
- Pascal Légitimus : Ludovic
- Arly Jover : Inès
- Catherine Mouchet : Brigitte
- Claire Nadeau : Nicole
- Jacques Herlin : Mr. Blanchard
- Julie Ferrier : The seer
- Nadège Beausson-Diagne : Sylvie
- Soko : The schoolgirl
