= Jacques Décombe =

- Born: 1953 (age 72–73); France
- Occupations: Author; actor; theatre director
- Known for: Directing shows for Les Inconnus; Molière Award for Best Comedy Show (1991)

Jacques Décombe is a French author, actor and director born in 1953.

== Biography ==
After he studied at the Conservatoire national d'art dramatique, he was the director of the shows of Les Inconnus at the request of Didier Bourdon and won the Molière Award for best comedy show. (See fr:Molière du meilleur spectacle comique) in 1991. He also directed shows by Charlotte de Turckheim, Chevallier et Laspalès, Patrick Timsit, Les Chevaliers du fiel...
