= The Car Keys =

2003 French mockumentary film

- Film poster
- French: Les Clefs de bagnole
- Directed by: Laurent Baffie
- Written by: Laurent Baffie
- Produced by: Laurent Baffie
- Starring: Laurent Baffie; Daniel Russo
- Cinematography: Philippe Vene
- Edited by: Anne Lafarge
- Music by: Ramon Pipin
- Production company: Laurent Baffie Productions
- Distributed by: Rezo Films
- Release date: 10 December 2003
- Running time: 90 minutes
- Country: France
- Language: French
- Budget: $4.3 million
- Box office: $1.1 million

The Car Keys (French: Les Clefs de bagnole) is a 2003 French mockumentary film written, produced, directed by, and starring Laurent Baffie.

== Synopsis ==
It's hard to make a good movie. Laurent Baffie understands this and takes Daniel Russo on a quirky adventure in search of the car keys he lost. In reality, his keys are in his left pocket, but all of this is just an allegory of life, friendship, and adventure. An adventure in which Baffie plays himself, while at the same time directing, screenwriting, and producing.

== Cast ==
- Laurent Baffie as Laurent
- Daniel Russo as Daniel
- Alexandra Sarramona as Lucie
- Pascal Sellem as Pascal
- Bruno Moynot as Zadko Preskovic
- Dani as The Bourgeois
- Gérard Depardieu as Cheese maker
- Alain Chabat as Dog seller
- Michel Galabru as Teacher
- Jean-Marie Bigard as Bank director
- Mado Maurin as Woman in white
- Chantal Ladesou as Bank teller
- Chantal Lauby as clingy woman
- Claire Maurier as Old lady
- François Rollin as Marineland director
- Guillaume Canet as himself
- Marina Foïs as herself
- Régis Laspalès as himself
- Pierre Arditi as himself
- Thierry Lhermitte as himself
- Kad Merad as himself
- Olivier Baroux as himself
- Gérard Darmon as himself
- Dominique Besnehard as himself
- Elise Larnicol as herself
- Albert Dupontel as himself
- Didier Bourdon as himself
- Bernard Campan as himself
- Pascal Légitimus as himself
- Jean-Paul Rouve as himself
- Édouard Baer as himself
- Dominique Farrugia as himself
- Jacques Gamblin as himself
- Michael Youn as himself
