= Bernard Campan =

French actor, film director and writer

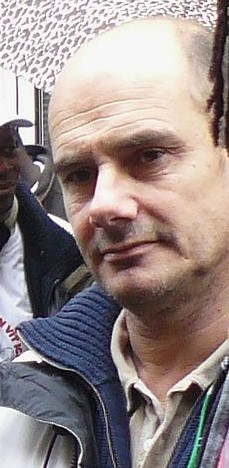
- Bernard Campan in 2010
- Born: 4 April 1958 (age 68); Agen, France
- Occupations: Humorist, comedian, film director, screenwriter
- Years active: 1982–present

Bernard Campan (born 4 April 1958) is a French actor, film director and writer. He is a member of Les Inconnus trio of humorists. He won a César Award for Best Debut for Les Trois Frères, and was nominated for best actor for his role in Se souvenir des belles choses.

== Theatre ==
Year	Title	Author	Director	Notes
1987	Au secours… Tout va bien !	Les Inconnus	Les Inconnus	
1989–90	Au secours… Tout va mieux !	Les Inconnus	Jacques Décombe	Molière Award for Best Comedy
1991	Isabelle a les yeux bleus	Les Inconnus	Jacques Décombe	
1993	Le Nouveau Spectacle	Les Inconnus	Jacques Décombe	
2016	Le Syndrome de l'écossais	Isabelle Le Nouvel	Jean-Louis Benoît	

== Filmography ==
Year	Title	Role	Director	Notes
1982–86	Le Petit Théâtre de Bouvard	Various	Various	Also Writer
1985	Le téléphone sonne toujours deux fois!!	Ugo Campani	Jean-Pierre Vergne	Also Writer
1990–93	La télé des inconnus	Various	Bernard Flament, Jean-Paul Jaud & Gérard Pullicino	TV series (7 episodes); Also Writer; 7 d'Or for Best Broadcast - Special Class
1995	The Three Brothers	Bernard Latour	Didier Bourdon & Bernard Campan	Also Director & Writer; César Award for Best First Feature Film
1997	The Bet	Bernard	Didier Bourdon & Bernard Campan	Also Director & Writer
1999	Augustin, King of Kung-Fu	Boutinot	Anne Fontaine	
1999	Doggy Bag	Taxi driver	Frédéric Comtet	
2000	L'extraterrestre	Yeb	Didier Bourdon	
2000	Antilles sur Seine	West Indian maid	Pascal Légitimus	
2001	Les Rois mages	Melchior	Didier Bourdon & Bernard Campan	Also Director & Writer
2001	Beautiful Memories	Philippe	Zabou Breitman	Cabourg Film Festival - Best New Actor; Nominated - César Award for Best Actor
2002	Jojo la frite	Tonio	Nicolas Cuche	
2002	Bâtards	Co-producer	Frédéric Saurel	
2002	Le cri	The Warrant	Emmanuel Robert-Espalieu	Short
2003	Le Cœur des hommes	Antoine	Marc Esposito	
2003	The Car Keys	Himself	Laurent Baffie	
2004	Lightweight	Chief	Jean-Pierre Améris	Also Producer
2005	How Much Do You Love Me?	François	Bertrand Blier	
2006	The Man of My Life	Frédéric	Zabou Breitman	
2007	La face cachée	François	Bernard Campan	Also Director & Writer
2007	Le coeur des hommes 2	Antoine	Marc Esposito	
2009	One for the Road	Marc	Philippe Godeau	
2009	Park Benches	The wicked neighbor	Bruno Podalydès	
2009	Une semaine sur deux (et la moitié des vacances scolaires)	François	Ivan Calbérac	
2009	Revivre	Antoine Lacombe	Haim Bouzaglo	TV mini-series
2010	Le café du pont	Maurice Perret	Manuel Poirier	
2010	No et moi	Lou's father	Zabou Breitman	
2013	Le coeur des hommes 3	Antoine	Marc Esposito	
2014	Les Trois Frères, le retour	Bernard Latour	Didier Bourdon & Bernard Campan	Also Director, Producer & Writer
2014	Aïssa	Dr. Perrault	Clément Tréhin-Lalanne	Short
2015	La boule noire	Vincent Ferreira	Denis Malleval	TV movie Luchon International Film Festival - Best Actor
2015	Presque comme les autres	Christophe	Renaud Bertrand	TV movie
2017	Un sac de billes	Amboise Mancelier	Christian Duguay	
2021	Beautiful Minds	Louis	Alexandre Jollien & Bernard Campan	Also director and writer
