= Jackie Oudney =

- Born: Jacqueline Oudney; Dundee, Angus, Scotland
- Years active: 2004 – present

Jackie Oudney, is a British film and commercials director.

== Biography ==
Jackie Oudney was born and raised in Dundee, Scotland. She studied Stage Management at The Royal Academy of Dramatic Art (RADA), London and Camera at the National Film and Television School (NFTS) in London. She has directed over 30 commercials, winning several international awards including a Silver Lion at Cannes (Cannes Lions International Advertising Festival) and a Silver D&AD pencil. She's also directed two award-winning, BAFTA-nominated short films. In May 2009 she completed her first feature, British comedy film French Film, produced by Slingshot from a script by Aschlin Ditta. The film stars Hugh Bonneville, Eric Cantona, Anne-Marie Duff, Victoria Hamilton and Douglas Henshall.
