= Élisabeth Rappeneau =

French film director (1940–2020)

- Born: 19 January 1940; Auxerre, France
- Died: 2 January 2020 (aged 79); Paris, France
- Occupations: Film director Screenwriter
- Years active: 1962–2020

Élisabeth Rappeneau (19 January 1940 – 2 January 2020) was a French film director and screenwriter.

== Personal life ==
She was the sister of the French director Jean-Paul Rappeneau and the aunt of musician Martin Rappeneau and screenwriter Julien Rappeneau.

== Filmography ==
Year	Title	Role	Notes
1962	Le Doulos	Script girl	
1962	Le combat dans l'île	Script girl	
1963	Magnet of Doom	Script supervisor	
1963	The Fire Within	Script girl	
1966	A Matter of Resistance	Script girl	
1966	Diamond Safari	Script supervisor	
1966	Les créatures	Script girl	
1967	The Thief of Paris	Script girl	
1968	Very Happy Alexander	Script girl	
1968	La Chamade	Script supervisor	
1969	Clérambard	Script supervisor	
1970	Le Distrait	Script girl	
1971	Murmur of the Heart	Script girl	
1971	It Only Happens to Others	Technical collaborator	
1971	Papa les petits bateaux...	Script supervisor	
1972	Ça va, ça vient	Script supervisor	
1973	Hail the Artist	Script girl	
1973	I Don't Know Much, But I'll Say Everything	Script supervisor	
1973	Au rendez-vous de la mort joyeuse	Script girl	
1973	Défense de savoir	Script supervisor	
1975	Lovers Like Us	Writer	
1975	That Most Important Thing: Love	Script girl	
1975	Incorrigible	Script supervisor	
1976	Lumière	Script supervisor	
1976	Pardon Mon Affaire	Script supervisor	
1976	Sérail	Script supervisor	
1977	Pardon Mon Affaire, Too!	Script supervisor	
1979	Womanlight	Script supervisor	
1981	Clara et les Chics Types	Script supervisor	
1982	All Fired Up	Writer	
1984	The Twin	Writer	
1984	Aéroport : Issue de secours	Writer	
1985	Une Femme ou Deux	Writer	
1988	Frequent Death	Director & writer	
1989	Mieux vaut courir	Director & writer	TV movie
1992	Turbulences	Director & writer	TV movie
1993	L'amour assassin	Director	TV movie
1994	Julie Lescaut	Director	TV series (4 episodes)
1995	Terrain glissant	Writer	TV movie
1996	Le secret d'Iris	Director	TV movie
1996	Notre homme	Director	TV movie
1997	La famille Sapajou	Director	TV movie
1997	L'amour dans le désordre	Director	TV movie
1998	Telle mère, telle fille	Director	TV movie
1998	La famille Sapajou - le retour	Director	TV movie
1999	Sapajou contre Sapajou	Director	TV movie
2000	Chacun chez soi	Director	TV movie
2000	Un homme en colère	Director	TV series (1 episode)
2001	L'impasse du cachalot	Director	TV movie
2001	Un citronnier pour deux	Director	TV movie
2003	Les femmes ont toujours raison	Director	TV movie
2003	Changer tout	Director	TV movie
2004	L'insaisissable	Director	TV movie
2005	Une vie	Director	TV movie Luchon International Film Festival - Cyrano Award
2005	Ma meilleure amie	Director	TV movie
2006	Inséparables	Director	TV series (3 episodes)
2008	La maison Tellier	Director	TV movie
2009	Cet été-là	Director	TV movie
2010	Quand vient la peur...	Director	TV movie
2010	Paul et ses femmes	Director	TV movie
2011	J'ai peur d'oublier	Director	TV movie Nominated - Monte-Carlo Television Festival - Television Films - Best Director
2011	Gérald K Gérald	Director	TV movie
2013	Je vous présente ma femme	Director	TV movie
