= Didier Bourdon =

French actor, screenwriter and film director (born 1959)

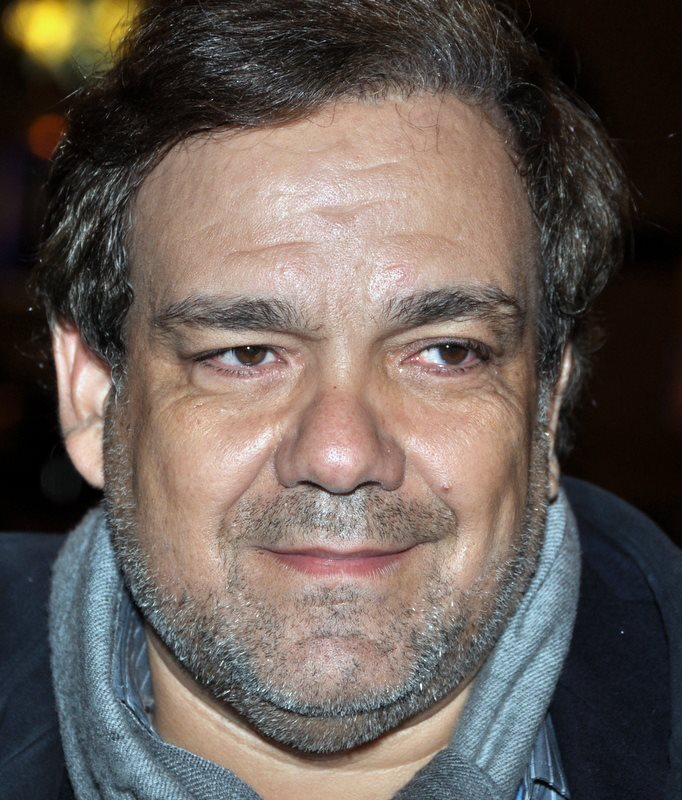
- Bourdon in 2013
- Born: 23 January 1959 (age 67); Algiers, French Algeria
- Occupations: Film actor, screenwriter, film director
- Years active: 1978–present

Didier Bourdon (French pronunciation: [didje buʁdɔ̃]; born 23 January 1959) is a French actor, screenwriter, and film director.

He first reached stardom in France when he created the comedic trio Les Inconnus with Bernard Campan and Pascal Légitimus, which was very popular throughout the 1990s.

== Theatre ==
Year	Title	Author	Director	Notes
1978	Colonel Chabert	Honoré de Balzac	Jean Meyer	
1978	Volpone	Ben Jonson	Jean Meyer	
1978	Dom Juan	Molière	Jean Meyer	
1978	Un ménage en or	Jean Valmy & Marc Cab	Maurice Ducasse	
1979	Le Chandelier	Alfred de Musset	Jean Meyer	
1981	Amusez-vous... Ah ces années 30	Jacques Décombe	Jacques Décombe	
1987	Au secours… Tout va bien !	Les Inconnus	Les Inconnus	
1989–90	Au secours… Tout va mieux !	Les Inconnus	Jacques Décombe	Molière Award for Best Comedy
1991	Isabelle a les yeux bleus	Les Inconnus	Jacques Décombe	
1993	Le Nouveau Spectacle	Les Inconnus	Jacques Décombe	
2009–10	La Cage aux Folles	Jean Poiret	Didier Caron	

== Filmography ==
Year	Title	Role	Director	Notes
1982	Les chômeurs en folie	Anatole	Georges Cachoux	
1982	Le bourgeois gentilhomme		Roger Coggio	
1982–86	Le Petit Théâtre de Bouvard	Various	Various	Also Writer
1983	S.A.S. à San Salvador		Raoul Coutard	
1983	Cinéma 16		André Halimi	TV series (1 episode)
1984	The Blood of Others	The Second Soldier	Claude Chabrol	
1985	Le téléphone sonne toujours deux fois!!	Marc Elbichon	Jean-Pierre Vergne	Also Writer
1990–93	La télé des inconnus	Various	Bernard Flament, Jean-Paul Jaud & Gérard Pullicino	TV series (7 episodes); Also Writer; 7 d'Or for Best Broadcast – Special Class
1992	Dark at Noon	Doctor Felicien	Raúl Ruiz	
1994	The Machine	Michel Zyto	François Dupeyron	
1995	The Three Brothers	Didier Latour	Didier Bourdon & Bernard Campan	Also Director, Writer & Composer; César Award for Best First Feature Film
1997	The Bet	Didier	Didier Bourdon & Bernard Campan	Also Director & Writer
1997	Tout doit disparaître	Robert Millard	Philippe Muyl	
1999	Doggy Bag	William	Frédéric Comtet	
2000	Antilles sur Seine	West Indian Maid	Pascal Légitimus	
2000	L'extraterrestre	Zerph	Didier Bourdon	Also Director & Writer
2001	Les Rois mages	Balthazar	Didier Bourdon & Bernard Campan	Also Director & Writer
2001	Tapis	The Man	Yzabel Dzisky	Short
2002	À l'abri des regards indiscrets	Beggar to 'billions'	Ruben Alves & Hugo Gélin	Short
2003	Fanfan la Tulipe	Louis XV	Gérard Krawczyk	
2003	The Car Keys	Himself	Laurent Baffie	
2003	7 ans de mariage	Alain	Didier Bourdon	Also Director & Writer
2003	Kelif et Deutsch à la recherche d'un emploi	Guest	Frédéric Berthe	TV series (1 episode)
2004	Madame Édouard	Irma	Nadine Monfils	
2005	Vive la vie	Richard Lewitsky	Yves Fajnberg	Also Writer & Producer
2006	A Good Year	Francis Duflot	Ridley Scott	
2006	Madame Irma	Francis / Irma	Didier Bourdon & Yves Fajnberg	Also Director & Writer
2008	Bouquet final	Gervais Bron	Michel Delgado	
2008	Myster Mocky présente		Jean-Pierre Mocky	TV series (1 episode)
2009	Park Benches	The Captain	Bruno Podalydès	
2009	Bambou	Alain Lenoir	Didier Bourdon	Also Director & Writer
2009	Contes et nouvelles du XIXème siècle	Doctor Crosnier	Denis Malleval	TV series (1 episode)
2012	Comme un air d'autoroute	Degrand	Vincent Burgevin & Franck Lebon	TV movie
2013	Some Place Else (15 jours ailleurs)	Vincent	Didier Bivel	TV movie Luchon International Film Festival – Best Actor
2014	Les Trois Frères, le retour	Didier Latour	Didier Bourdon & Bernard Campan	Also Director, Writer, Producer & Composer
2014	Jacky in Women's Kingdom	Brunu	Riad Sattouf	
2014	Un village presque parfait	Germain	Stéphane Meunier	
2014	Le voyage de monsieur Perrichon	Monsieur Perrichon	Éric Lavaine	TV movie
2015	Serial Teachers 2	Serge Cutiro	Pierre-François Martin-Laval	
2015	The Roommates Party	Pierre Dubreuil	Alexandra Leclère	
2015	La crise du cinéaste québécois	TV Presenter	Patrick Damien-Roy	Short
2017	Alibi.com	Gérard Martin	Philippe Lacheau	
2017	The New Adventures of Cinderella	The King	Lionel Steketee	
2017	Garde alternée	Jean	Alexandra Leclère	
2019	Beaux-parents	André Rossi	Héctor Cabello Reyes	
2021	Mes très chers enfants	Christian Blanc	Alexandra Leclère	
2023	Open Season	Bernard		
