= Pan-Européenne =

French film production and publishing company

- Type: Subsidiary
- Industry: Entertainment
- Founded: 1990
- Founder: Philippe Godeau
- Headquarters: 10, rue Lincoln; Paris, France
- Products: Motion pictures
- Parent: Vuelta Group (2023–)
- Divisions: Pan Animation; Pan Cinema; Pan Distribution

Pan-Européenne is a French film production and distribution company. Originally focused solely on distribution, it expanded into production in 1992 with the film Beau fixe. It has produced various films, including Jaco Van Dormael's The Eighth Day (1996) and Mr. Nobody (2009), Jérôme Salle's Largo Winch (2008), and distributed Bryan Singer's The Usual Suspects (1995), Frank Miller and Robert Rodriguez's Sin City (2005).

== History ==
Pan-Européenne was created in the late 1980s by Philippe Godeau. By distributing films such as Jaco Van Dormael's Toto the Hero (1991), Cyril Collard's Savage Nights (1992), and Jacques Audiard's See How They Fall (1994), Pan-Européenne began its activity of production company. The film studio Polygram entrusted to the company the distribution of their films in France. In 1999 it ended the partnership following the acquisition of Polygram by Universal. The restructuring of the group divides into two branches the company: Pan-Européenne Edition, an independent distribution created in 2001, and Pan-Européenne Production.

In 2004, Wild Bunch chose Pan-Européenne Edition for the distribution in French market. After the association of Pan-Européenne and Wild Bunch in distributing films in France, Pan-Européenne Edition took the name of Wild Bunch Distribution in 2006. Since then, Pan-Européenne Production became Pan-Européenne and the company began a series of international projects such as Largo Winch (2008), filmed in Malta, Sicily and Hong Kong, and Mr. Nobody (2009), a co-production of Belgium, Canada, France and Germany.

In April 2022, Pan-Européenne announced that they're re-entering the distribution business by creating their new distribution arm named Pan Distribution.

In September 2023, it was announced that European production and distribution group Vuelta Group had acquired a stake in Pan-Européenne along with their divisions.

== Filmography - Produced films (Pan Cinema) ==
Among the films directly produced by Pan-Européenne are:

- 1992 : Patrick Dewaere by Marc Esposito
- 1992 : An Independent Life by Vitali Kanevskiy
- 1995 : Adultery: A User's Guide by Christine Pascal
- 1995 : Le Garçu by Maurice Pialat
- 1996 : The Eighth Day by Jaco Van Dormael
- 1999 : Bad Company by Jean-Pierre Améris
- 2000 : Baise-moi by Virginie Despentes and Coralie Trinh Thi
- 2001 : C'est la vie by Jean-Pierre Améris
- 2001 : Change-moi ma vie by Liria Bégéja
- 2002 : Monique : toujours contente by Valérie Guignabodet
- 2004 : Chemins de traverse by Manuel Poirier
- 2004 : Mariages ! by Valérie Guignabodet
- 2004 : Lightweight by Jean-Pierre Améris
- 2004 : Me and My Sister by Alexandra Leclère
- 2005 : Camping à la ferme by Jean-Pierre Sinapi
- 2006 : The Man of My Life by Zabou Breitman
- 2006 : Mauvaise Foi by Roschdy Zem
- 2007 : Danse avec lui by Valérie Guignabodet
- 2007 : The Price to Pay by Alexandra Leclère
- 2007 : La Face cachée by Bernard Campan
- 2007 : Game of Four by Bruno Dega and Jeanne Le Guillou
- 2008 : Largo Winch by Jérôme Salle
- 2008 : Magique ! by Philippe Muyl
- 2009 : Sticky Fingers by Ken Scott
- 2009 : One for the Road by Philippe Godeau
- 2009 : Oscar and the Lady in Pink by Éric-Emmanuel Schmitt
- 2009 : Divorces by Valérie Guignabodet
- 2010 : Mr. Nobody by Jaco Van Dormael
- 2010 : Romantics Anonymous by Jean-Pierre Améris
- 2010 : Largo Winch 2 by Jérôme Salle
- 2013 : 11.6 by Philippe Godeau
- 2013 : Juliette by Pierre Godeau
- 2014 : The Three Brothers are back by Didier Bourdon and Bernard Campan
- 2015 : Sous X by Jean-Michel Correia
- 2015 : Une famille à louer by Jean-Pierre Améris
- 2015 : The Roommates Party by Alexandra Leclère
- 2016 : Down by Love by Pierre Godeau
- 2016 : The Odyssey by Jérôme Salle
- 2017 : Garde alternée by Alexandra Leclère
- 2019 : Raoul Taburin a un secret by Pierre Godeau
- 2019 : Perfect Nanny by Lucie Borleteau
- 2019 : Yao by Philippe Godeau
- 2022 : Le Tigre et le Président by Jean-Marc Peyrefitte
- 2022 : Beautiful Minds by Bernard Campan and Alexandre Jollien

Among the films produced by Pan Cinema are:

- 2023 : Le Clan by Éric Fraticelli
- 2023 : Inestimable by Éric Fraticelli
- 2024 : Sous le vent des Marquises by Pierre Godeau
- 2024 : The Price of Money: A Largo Winch Adventure by Olivier Masset-Depasse
- 2025 : La Fille d'un grand amour by Agnès De Sacy
- 2025 : The Dreamers by Isabelle Carré
- 2025 : In the Land of Arto by Tamara Stepanyan

== Filmography - Distributed films (Pan Distribution) ==
Among the titles released by Pan-Européenne are:

- 1990 : La Discrète by Christian Vincent
- 1990 : Freeze Die Come to Life by Vitali Kanevsky
- 1991 : L'Autre by Bernard Giraudeau
- 1991 : Toto the Hero by Jaco Van Dormael
- 1991 : Paris Awakens by Olivier Assayas
- 1992 : The Sentinel by Arnaud Desplechin
- 1992 : Beau fixe by Christian Vincent
- 1992 : Patrick Dewaere by Marc Esposito
- 1992 : Bob Roberts by Tim Robbins
- 1992 : An Independent Life by Vitali Kanevskiy
- 1992 : Savage Nights by Cyril Collard
- 1993 : Le Jeune Werther by Jacques Doillon
- 1993 : Hélas pour moi (Alas for Me) by Jean-Luc Godard
- 1993 : The Birth of Love by Philippe Garrel
- 1993 : It's All True by Richard Wilson
- 1994 : Before the Rain by Milcho Manchevski
- 1994 : Coming to Terms with the Dead by Pascale Ferran
- 1994 : Wild Reeds by André Téchiné
- 1994 : See How They Fall by Jacques Audiard
- 1994 : Cold Water by Olivier Assayas
- 1994 : Four Weddings and a Funeral by Mike Newell
- 1995 : Up, Down, Fragile by Jacques Rivette
- 1995 : Adultery: A User's Guide by Christine Pascal
- 1995 : Oublie-moi by Noëmie lvovsky
- 1995 : Le Garçu by Maurice Pialat
- 1995 : The Adventures of Priscilla, Queen of the Desert by Stephan Elliott
- 1995 : The Usual Suspects by Bryan Singer
- 1996 : The Eighth Day by Jaco Van Dormael
- 1996 : Shallow Grave by Danny Boyle
- 1999 : Bad Company by Jean-Pierre Améris
- 2000 : Baise-moi by Virginie Despentes and Coralie Trinh Thi
- 2001 : C'est la vie by Jean-Pierre Améris
- 2001 : Change-moi ma vie by Liria Bégéja
- 2002 : Monique : toujours contente by Valérie Guignabodet
- 2002 : Beautiful Memories by Zabou BreitmanSe souvenir des belles choses de Zabou Breitman
- 2003 : Respiro by Emanuele Crialese
- 2003 : Shōjo by Eiji Okuda
- 2003 : Eager Bodies by Xavier Giannoli
- 2003 : Travail d'Arabe by Christian Philibert
- 2003 : Ken Park by Larry Clark
- 2003 : Merci Dr Rey by Andrew Litvack
- 2004 : Chemins de traverse by Manuel Poirier
- 2004 : Mariages ! by Valérie Guignabodet
- 2004 : Lightweight by Jean-Pierre Améris
- 2004 : CQ2 (Seek You Too) by Carole Laure
- 2004 : Me and My Sister by Alexandra Leclère
- 2004 : Pinocchio 3000 by Daniel Robichaud
- 2004 : Three... Extremes by Fruit Chan, Park Chan Wook and Takashi Miike
- 2004 : Dumplings by Fruit Chan
- 2004 : Undertow by David Gordon Green
- 2005 : The New One-Armed Swordsman (1971) by Chang Cheh (re-release)
- 2005 : 9 Songs by Michael Winterbottom
- 2005 : Sin City by Robert Rodriguez and Frank Miller
- 2005 : Camping à la ferme by Jean-Pierre Sinapi
- 2005 : Land of the Dead by George A. Romero
- 2005 : How Much Do You Love Me? by Bertrand Blier
- 2005 : The Wayward Cloud by Tsai Ming-Liang
- 2005 : Mary by Abel Ferrara
- 2005 : Perhaps Love by Peter Ho-Sun Chan
- 2006 : Comedy of Power by Claude Chabrol
- 2006 : Hey Good Looking! by Lisa Azuelos
- 2006 : Invisible Waves by Pen-Ek Ratanaruang
- 2006 : Murderers by Patrick Grandperret
- 2006 : The Goodbye Kiss by Michele Soavi
- 2006 : Président by Lionel Delplanque
- 2006 : The Man of My Life by Zabou Breitman
- 2006 : Mauvaise Foi by Roschdy Zem
- 2006 : Pan's Labyrinth by Guillermo del Toro
- 2006 : My Best Friend by Patrice Leconte
- 2006 : The Serpent by Éric Barbier

Among the titles released by Pan Distribution are:

- 2022 : Final Cut by Michel Hazanavicius
- 2023 : Les Gardiennes de la planète by Jean-Albert Lièvre
- 2023 : Bonne conduite by Jonathan Barré
- 2023 : Consent by Vanessa Filho
- 2023 : Omen by Baloji
- 2023 : Ma France à moi by Benoît Cohen
- 2023 : Le Clan by Éric Fraticelli
- 2023 : Inestimable by Éric Fraticelli
- 2024 : Sous le vent des Marquises by Pierre Godeau
- 2024 : The Feeling That the Time for Doing Something Has Passed by Joanna Arnow
- 2024 : A Little Something Extra by Artus
- 2024 : The Price of Money: A Largo Winch Adventure by Olivier Masset-Depasse
- 2024 : Fêlés by Christophe Duthuron
- 2024 : The Devil's Bath by Veronika Franz and Severin Fiala
- 2024 : Marmaille by Grégory Lucily
- 2025 : La Fille d'un grand amour by Agnès De Sacy
- 2025 : Queer by Luca Guadagnino
- 2025 : Diplodocus by Wojtek Wawszczyk
- 2025 : Indomptables de Thomas Ngijol
- 2025 : Ciudad sin sueño de Guillermo Galoe
