= Largo Winch (film series) =

French film franchise

The Largo Winch film series is a French-Belgian action thriller film franchise based on the Belgian comic book series Largo Winch created by Jean Van Hamme and Philippe Francq. The films follow Largo Winch, a young billionaire and heir to the multinational conglomerate Group W, who becomes involved in international conspiracies, corporate power struggles, and criminal plots.

The series consists of three films released between 2008 and 2024: Largo Winch (2008), Largo Winch II (2011), and The Price of Money: A Largo Winch Adventure (2024). All three films star Tomer Sisley in the title role.

Produced on a combined budget of approximately $66.1 million, the trilogy has grossed about $48.1 million worldwide, reflecting a poor commercial performance.

== Background and source material ==
The franchise is adapted from the long-running Belgian comic book series Largo Winch, which began in 1990 and became widely popular in Europe. The comics focus on themes of corporate intrigue, financial crime, and global adventure. The film adaptations modernize these themes into action-oriented thriller narratives set across multiple international locations.

== Films ==
=== Largo Winch (2008) ===
The first film, titled Largo Winch (released in some markets as The Heir Apparent: Largo Winch), which was directed by Jérôme Salle and stars Tomer Sisley in the title role. The plot follows Largo as he inherits control of Group W after the mysterious death of his adoptive father, Nerio Winch, and becomes the target of a corporate conspiracy.

The film was released in France and Belgium in December 2008 and had a budget of approximately $25 million. It grossed around $30.2 million worldwide.

=== Largo Winch II (2011) ===
The second installment, Largo Winch II (also known internationally as The Burma Conspiracy), was released in 2011 and again directed by Jérôme Salle. The film continues the story of Largo Winch as he is accused of crimes against humanity while uncovering a larger conspiracy spanning multiple countries.

It starred Sisley alongside Sharon Stone and other international actors. The film had a budget of approximately $24.1 million and earned about $14.1 million worldwide.

=== The Price of Money: A Largo Winch Adventure (2024) ===
The third film, The Price of Money: A Largo Winch Adventure (also referred to as Largo Winch 3), was directed by Olivier Masset-Depasse and released in 2024. It follows Largo Winch as he attempts to locate his kidnapped son while confronting financial ruin and a broader corporate conspiracy.

The film stars Sisley, who reprises his role as Largo Winch, and James Franco as the antagonist. The film had a production budget of approximately $17 million and grossed nearly $3.8 million worldwide.

== Cast and characters ==
The central character throughout the franchise is Largo Winch, portrayed by Tomer Sisley in all three films. Other recurring or notable characters include members of Group W and various allies and antagonists involved in corporate and criminal conflicts.

== Reception ==
Critical reception of the series has been mixed. The first film received moderate international attention, while the second film received generally negative reviews from critics. The third film received limited commercial success compared to its production budget.

== Relationship to the comic series ==
While based on the original comic books, the films often combine multiple comic storylines or create original plots rather than directly adapting individual volumes. This approach allows the films to function as standalone action narratives while retaining the core premise of the source material.

== See also ==
- Largo Winch (comic book series)
- Largo Winch (TV series)
- Belgian comics in film adaptations
- Lists of French films
- List of Franco-Belgian comics series
