= Largo Winch II =

- French promotional poster
- Directed by: Jérôme Salle
- Written by: Julien Rappeneau; Jérôme Salle
- Based on: Largo Winch by: Philippe Francq; Jean Van Hamme
- Produced by: Philippe Godeau
- Starring: Tomer Sisley; Sharon Stone
- Cinematography: Denis Rouden
- Edited by: Stan Collet
- Music by: Alexandre Desplat
- Production company: Pan Européenne Production
- Distributed by: Cinéart; Wild Bunch Distribution
- Release date: 16 February 2011
- Running time: 119 minutes
- Countries: France; Belgium; Germany
- Languages: French; English
- Budget: $24.1 million
- Box office: $14.1 million

Largo Winch II (released internationally as The Burma Conspiracy) is a 2011 French action thriller film based on the Belgian comic book Largo Winch. It was released in France and Belgium on 16 February 2011. It is the sequel to the 2008 film Largo Winch. A third sequel, The Price of Money: A Largo Winch Adventure, was released in 2024, making it the third film in the Largo Winch franchise.

== Plot ==
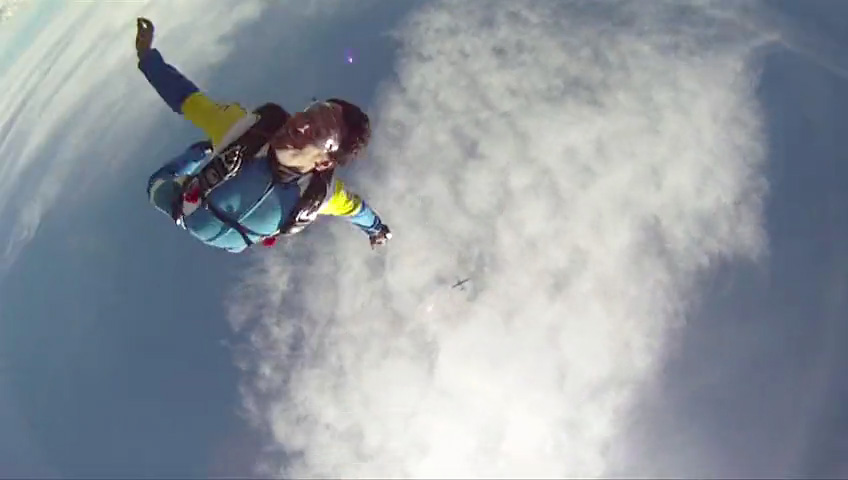
Tomer Sisley skydiving for the filming of Largo Winch II.

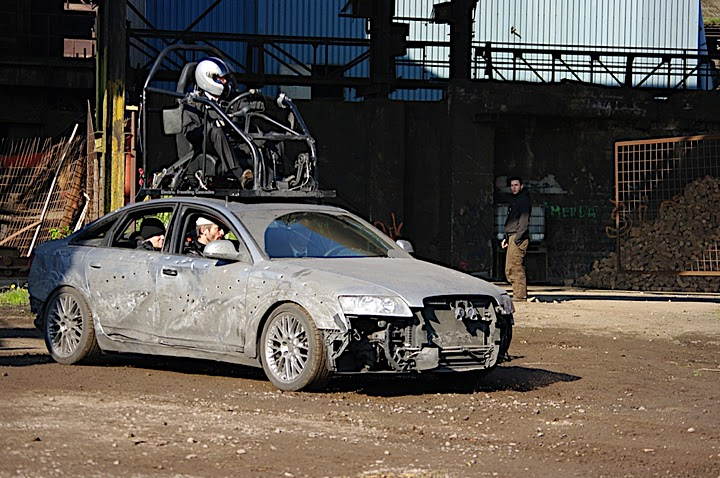
Audi A6 (C6) used in the film.

Three years before his death, Nerio Winch, while driving from a business meeting in Hong Kong, informs Freddy, his bodyguard, that he has found his son, Largo, in a village in Burma, and orders Freddy to tail him. Meanwhile, Largo has just saved a group of villagers from a massacre caused by a Junta local militia, led by General Min. While healing the locals on a secluded spot with his lover, Malunai, a French man named Simon Ovronnaz arrives in the village along with several survivors he picked up with his vehicle. However, when he informs them that he was employed by a man who worked for Min, the locals, led by Kadjang, severely beat him up. However, Largo intervenes and accidentally wounds Kadjang with his own blade, and he is banished from the village, and Malunai denounces him. Largo leaves with Simon and they leave Burma, Largo going elsewhere, while Simon heads for Bangkok.

In the present day, after gaining leadership of the W Group, Largo announces that he is selling his entire company and will donate to charity all the proceeds of the sale of his shares. He enlists the help of Alexandre Jung, his father's partner and childhood friend (and one of the few who knew of Largo's existence), also a former director of the Red Cross, and W Group's current director, Dwight Cochrane. However, as he is signing the papers on Nerio's yacht, Neretva, a Hong Kong Police unit, led by UN investigator Diane Francken, arrives, holding charges of crimes against humanity against Largo for cooperation for the massacre in Burma, since General Min was paid from Nerio's secret account called Pandora. While searching Largo's yacht, they also find Freddy strangled in his room. Largo realizes that, since Freddy was tailing him in Burma during the massacre and knew of his innocence, he was murdered.

As Francken publicly announces that she has a witness against Largo, he finds a phone number of a private bank in Switzerland and calls it, and he is given the information about the Pandora account and that it contains 68 million dollars. Holding this a secret, he, against the objections of his lawyers and Cochrane, books the flight to Bangkok to personally meet with Francken to meet the witness. He also instructs his personal butler, Gauthier, to go with him to Bangkok and to locate Simon, since he worked for General Min's associate. When they arrive in Bangkok, Gauthier leaves to find Simon while Largo goes to the UN embassy. Upon arriving, Largo is shocked to discover that the witness is Malunai, who falsely testifies against Largo for being involved in the massacre, and Francken also reports to him that General Min was paid from a secret account that Nerio owned, called Pandora. Largo violently objects to the accusations and strikes Malunai, and he is detained by Francken. However, The Thai government drops his charges and sets him free, and he is picked up by Cochrane. However, after getting his personal items back, he finds a "Sorry" note given to him by Malunai. He also finds out that she was deported back to Burma. Against Cochrane's protests, Largo leaves. Francken, angry for the deportation of Malunai and Largo's acquittal, finds out that Largo has contacted the private bank and goes to Zurich.

Largo arrives in Burma, where the local militia awaits him to transport him to General Min. However, en route, the jeep transporting Largo is attacked by the local resistance movement led by Kadjang, who is seeking revenge against Largo. However, Largo tells him his story and convinces him to join sides with him. They head to General Min's base, with Kudjang and his men disguised as soldiers, and Kudjang's men detonate several gas tanks, creating a diversion, while Largo releases the prisoners, and also Malunai herself, who reveals that Min forced her to falsely testify with the threat that they will kill her son. They head to General Min's hut, only to find him with Malunai's son, Noom. Min reveals that, while he was paid half in advance to massacre the village, he never got the rest of the money, and orders Largo to make a 25 million$ to Min's account. Largo obeys, but as he completes the transfer, Min attacks Largo who knocks him down and takes Noom and Malunai, and they escape by boat.

Meanwhile, Francken, who ordered the executives of the bank to record their calls, finds out about Largo's call to transfer the money to Min. Seeing this as evidence, she publicly announces this, causing W Group's shares to massively drop. Cochrane, much to his dismay, finds out that the W Group will be bought by a Russian industrialist called Nazatchov, who is at odds with Largo since he once attacked him during a business meeting. Since the prices were lowered, Nazatchov now has enough money to buy the group and already pays 5 billion dollars in advance. In Burma, Largo and Malunai arrive at a local hotel, where they rekindle their romance, and she reveals to Largo that Noom is his son, having impregnated her before he left. Largo contacts Gauthier, who has found Simon, and instructs him to arrive at the hotel. Meanwhile, General Min, who escaped the base, arrives at a rendezvous point where he is picked up via helicopter by a Serbian mercenary called Lazarevic, who informs him that he is not on Min's payroll, but actually is working for someone else, and then strangles Min to death.

Gauthier and Simon meet up with Largo, and Simon reveals that he was paid by a man named Thomas to drive him through Burma. He arrived with him at General Min's base, where he paid in advance for Min to organize the massacre using the Pandora account. However, when Nerio found out about the massacre, he refused to let Thomas to pay the rest of the money, and he was shot by Min while Simon secretly observed this from the car while he was behind the walls. Simon left, picking up the rest of the survivors among the way, before he arrived at the village where Largo stayed at. Later on, Malunai reveals that she was abducted by Lazarevic's mercenaries, and Largo finds a tracking device in her. Just then, Lazarevic's mistress Anna and another henchman arrive, and Largo manages to kill both of them, but not before Anna strangles Malunai to death. Largo picks up Noom and he leaves with Simon and Gauthier. Soon after, Lazarevic arrives at the hotel, finds his man and Anna dead, and swears revenge against Largo.

Largo contacts the private bank again and transfers only 7 dollars to another account, and then contacts Cochrane, who is in the car with Nazatchov, and informs him that he is heading to Zurich. Nazatchov, overhearing this, instructs Lazarevic to go to Zurich and kill him. However, Largo heads for Bangkok and secretly tails Lazarevic's group, who is departing in a private jet. He and Simon tie up the pilots in their hotel room and take their uniforms and await for Lazarevic, who board the plane, and they head for Zurich, intending to tail Lazarevic when they land. However, during the flight, Lazarevic finds out about the pilots and they corner Simon and Largo. They fight them, and Simon opens the plane doors, causing a decompression which ejects Simon out of the plane. Largo jumps out with a parachute, and Lazarevic follows them. In mid-air, Lazarevic fights Largo, who knocks him out and disables his parachute and saves Simon, while Lazarevic falls to his death.

Meanwhile, Francken finds out about the 7 dollar transfer and investigates Lazarevic's account, finding out that he was on Nazatchov's payroll, realizing that Largo is being set up. Largo and Simon go to Jung's house, and Simon stays in Jung's house while Jung takes him to Francken to clear out his name. However, when they arrive at the UN building, Jung injects him with a strong sedative, and reveals that Thomas is actually his son; Thomas worked for Nerio by making new deals across the world, and set up the secret bank account Pandora for Thomas to pay to the locals in exchange for information. Thomas instructed General Min to organize the massacre since the area was rich with nickel. However, Nerio was unaware of the massacre and when Thomas informed him about this, he refused to authorize him to pay the rest of the amount, disgusted by Thomas's actions. Jung also reveals that he made a deal with Nazatchov, who would take over the company in exchange for help, and that Lazarevic killed Min on Jung's orders, and that Largo was the scapegoat so he would be humiliated and sentenced to prison for life as a revenge.

Jung leaves to kill Francken so he could prevent her to clear Largo's name, while Largo lies sedated on the floor, unable to move. However, Simon, who found pictures of Thomas and realized Jung's plan, arrives at the UN building and gives Largo sugar to remedy the effects, and Largo instructs Simon to call the police while he heads to rescue Francken. He finds Jung holding Francken at knife point, and shouts about Thomas's immoral and unethical actions, which Jung refuses to accept, wanting Largo to beg for Francken's life just as he begged Nerio to save Thomas. However, Francken momentarily distracts Jung, and Largo runs up to him and knocks him over the stairwell, killing him.

In the aftermath, Largo is cleared of all charges by Francken, and Nazatchov is unable to buy the company since the stocks have raised high after Largo's name was cleared. Largo travels back to Burma where he and Noom are standing by Malunai's grave while Gauthier and Simon are watching them, where Largo promises to take care of Noom. He tells Noom that Malunai is watching both of them before they walk away together.

== Cast ==
- Tomer Sisley as Largo Winch
- Sharon Stone as Diane Francken
- Ulrich Tukur as Dwight Cochrane
- Napakpapha Nakprasitte as Malunaï
- Olivier Barthélémy as Simon Ovronnaz
- Laurent Terzieff as Alexandre Jung
- Nicolas Vaude as Gauthier
- Clemens Schick as Dragan Lazarevic
- Nirut Sirijhanya as Général Kyaw Min
- Dmitry Nazarov as Virgil Nazatchov
- François Montagut as Clive Hanson
- Anatole Taubman as Beaumont
- Praptpapol Suwanbang as Kadjang
- Weronika Rosati as Anna
- Carlo Brandt as Freddy Kaplan
- Elizabeth Bennett as Pennywinckle
- Leonardo Gillosi as Noom
- John Arnold as Thomas Jung
- Wolfgang Pissors as Attinger
- Olivia Jackson as Chloé
- Sonia Couling as Wang
- Sahajak Boonthanakit as Dan Khongpipat
- Philippe Van Kessel as Vladimir Podolsky
- Teerawat Mulvilai as Som Sak
- Vithaya Pansringarm as Colonel Komsan
- Saicheer Wongwirot as Ko Sin
- Charlie Dupont as Podolsky's Assistant

== Reception ==
Out of four reviews available on Rotten Tomatoes, all are negative. James Luxford of the National calls it "shaky and confusing".

== See also ==
- Largo Winch (TV series)
