= Largo Winch (film) =

2008 film

- Theatrical release poster
- Directed by: Jérôme Salle
- Screenplay by: Julien Rappeneau; Jérôme Salle
- Based on: Largo Winch by: Philippe Francq; Jean Van Hamme
- Produced by: Philippe Godeau
- Starring: Tomer Sisley
- Cinematography: Denis Rouden
- Edited by: Richard Marizy
- Music by: Alexandre Desplat
- Production company: Pan Européenne Production
- Release date: 17 December 2008
- Running time: 119 minutes
- Country: France
- Languages: English; French
- Budget: $25 million
- Box office: $30.2 million

Largo Winch (released in the U.S. as The Heir Apparent: Largo Winch) is a 2008 French action thriller film based on the Belgian comic book of the same name. It is the first installment in the Largo Winch film series and was released in France and Belgium on 17 December 2008, and in the United States in November 2011, where it was nominated for Best International Film at the 2012 Saturn Awards. A sequel, The Burma Conspiracy, was released in Belgium 16 February 2011.

== Plot ==
In Hong Kong, Nerio Winch, owner of W-Group is murdered on his yacht. The W-Group board of directors meet with Nerio's right-hand Ann Ferguson. They discover Nerio has a secret son named Largo, who was adopted and raised by French-Croatians Josip and Hana along with their own son Goran. Some are skeptical of Largo's existence.

In Brazil, Largo rescues NGO worker Léa from local militia. Léa injects Largo with a sedative and leaves, and Largo is captured by the militia and imprisoned. Nerio's bodyguard Freddy rescues Largo, and they depart for Nerio's funeral. Largo gets drunk and wakes up on a yacht. At W-Group's headquarters, he confirms to the board that he is Nerio's son and heir to W-Group.

Senior employee Meyer is shot dead by an assassin whom Largo unsuccessfully chases with the help of Stephan Marcus. Largo is shocked to find Léa with W-Group's competitor Michail Korsky. She flees, but he discovers her real name is Naomi and that she works for him. Korsky announces his intentions to buy W-Group. Ferguson secretly wishes to block Korsky by buying his corporation, but Largo must make the offer. Some skeptical board members are unwilling to lend Largo the money.

Largo travels to his childhood home in Dalmatia, where he meets his adoptive mother, the now-widowed Hana, and Goran, now a Croatian Army soldier. The next day, Hana finds Largo gone. Largo has travelled to a monastery where Nerio has a secret safe holding his stocks. Hana is threatened to reveal where Largo has gone by an armed group led by Marcus who is tracking Largo. Largo unlocks the safe and is cornered by Marcus, who takes his shares and shoots him. Badly injured, Largo gets back to Hana's place only to find it burning and Hana murdered. He faints but is rescued by his childhood friend Melina who takes care of him by healing his wound.

Ferguson reveals to Freddy that she organized Nerio's death to lure Largo into bringing the shares so she could buy a controlling stake in Korsky's group. She admits that Naomi is working for her. Freddy requests details of the hostile takeover in exchange for tracking down Largo. Ferguson agrees and sends Marcus for him. Freddy tries to warn Largo.

Largo meets Korsky and explains Ferguson's plans and Naomi's treachery, and that Ferguson intends to announce the new heir to W-Group at a ceremony in Hong Kong. Korsky agrees to withhold his plan to buy W-Group. Naomi reveals to Largo she is a mercenary and Largo agrees to pay her. Largo enters W-Group headquarters in disguise and is shocked to find Goran.

Goran recounts that, while searching for Largo's records in the orphanage's archives, he found his own records revealing that he was also adopted by Nerio and, thus, is also an heir to W-Group. Indeed, Ferguson had contacted him to be a figurehead for the company in exchange for money, while Ferguson would really hold the power. When Learning that Ferguson had had Hana killed, Goran agrees to help Largo. They, then, both fight Marcus but Marcus shoots Goran. Largo kills Marcus and grants Goran forgiveness as he dies from his fatal injuries.

At the meet, Freddy plays a video recording that he made of Ferguson's confession to him. Ferguson bitterly congratulates Largo on his victory before to leave the meeting and be arrested by the police. Largo reveals his identity and his plans to take over W-Group to thunderous applause from the audience.

== Cast ==
- Tomer Sisley as Largo Winch
  - Benjamin Siksou as Largo Winch a teenager
  - Kerian Mayan as Largo Winch as a child
  - Jake Vella as Largo Winch as a baby
- Mélanie Thierry as Léa/Naomie
- Bojana Panić as Melina
- Karel Roden as Mikhail Korsky
- Kristin Scott Thomas as Ann Ferguson
- Miki Manojlović as Nerio Winch
- Benedict Wong as Wiliam Kwan
- Radivoje Bukvić as Goran
- Elizabeth Bennett as Miss Pennywinkle
- Steven Waddington as Stephan Marcus
- Ivan Marevich as Josip
- Anne Consigny as Hannah
- Gilbert Melki as Freddy
- David Gasman as Meyer
- Nicolas Vaude as Gauthier
- Jefferson Cortez as Brazilian Police Man
- Emerson Cortez as Brazilian Police Man
- Predrag Vasić as Danis Vlatković

== Reception ==
As of June 2020, the film holds a 53% approval rating on Rotten Tomatoes, based on 19 reviews with an average rating of 5.38/10.

== See also ==
- Largo Winch (TV series)
