= Philippe Godeau =

French film producer, director and screenwriter

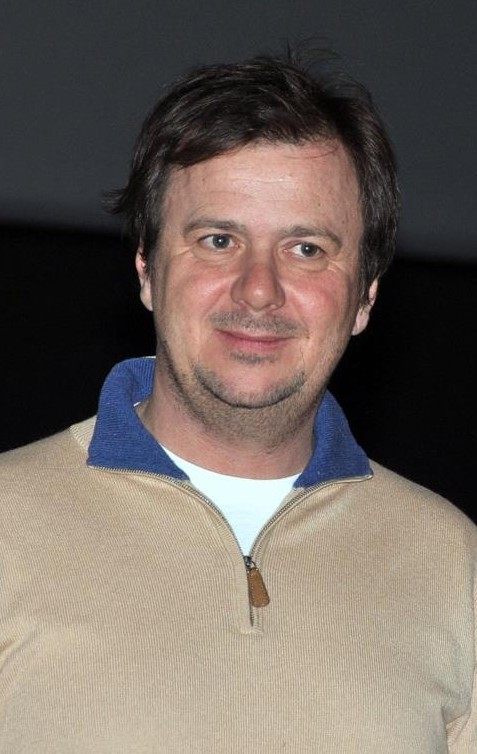
- Philippe Godeau in March 2013
- Born: 14 May 1961 (age 64); Clamart, France
- Occupations: Film producer; film director; screenwriter
- Years active: 1983–present
- Children: Pierre Godeau

Philippe Godeau (French: [gɔdo], born 14 May 1961) is a French film producer, director and screenwriter.

== Career ==
Godeau worked in distribution at Gaumont before founding the production and distribution film company Pan-Européenne.

Godeau has produced many films including An Independent Life (1992), Bad Company (1999), Lightweight (2004), Les Sœurs fâchées (2004), Largo Winch (2008) and Romantics Anonymous (2010). He collaborated with Jaco Van Dormael in The Eighth Day (1996) and Mr. Nobody (2009). Godeau has worked with Maurice Pialat, Virginie Despentes, and Jean-Pierre Améris.

His directorial debut was the 2009 drama One for the Road, starring François Cluzet, Mélanie Thierry and Michel Vuillermoz. Based on reporter Herve Chabalier's autobiography about his battle with alcoholism, the story takes place in a French Alps retreat where Cluzet confronts his dangerous addiction. The film received five nominations at the César Awards 2010, with Mélanie Thierry winning Most Promising Actress.

Godeau's next film, 11.6 (2013), is based on the real-life story of criminal Toni Musulin.

== Filmography ==
- Hideout (La Palombière) (1983)
- Le sixième doigt (1990)
- An Independent Life (Samostoyatelnaya zhizn) (1992)
- Adultery: A User's Guide (Adultère, mode d'emploi) (1995)
- Le Garçu (1995)
- The Eighth Day (Le Huitième jour) (1996)
- Bad Company (Mauvaises fréquentations) (1999)
- Baise-moi (2000)
- C'est la vie (2001)
- Change My Life (Change-moi ma vie) (2001)
- Monique (2002)
- Byways (Chemins de traverse) (2004)
- Mariages! (2004)
- Lightweight (Poids léger) (2004)
- Me and My Sister (Les Sœurs fâchées) (2004)
- The Man of My Life (L'homme de sa vie) (2006)
- Bad Faith (Mauvaise foi) (2006)
- Danse avec lui (2007)
- The Price to Pay (Le Prix à payer) (2007)
- Game of Four (Détrompez-vous) (2007)
- La Face cachée (2007)
- Magique! (2008)
- Largo Winch (2008)
- Mr. Nobody (2009)
- One for the Road (Le Dernier pour la route) (2009, also writer and director)
- Oscar and the Lady in Pink (Oscar et la Dame rose) (2009)
- Divorces! (2009)
- Romantics Anonymous (Les émotifs anonymes) (2010)
- Largo Winch II (2011)
- 11.6 (2013, also writer and director)
- Juliette (2013)
- Les Trois Frères, le retour (2014)
- Sous X (2015)
- Une famille à louer (2015)
- Le Grand Partage (2015)
- The Odyssey (2016)
- Down by Love (Éperdument) (2016)
- Garde alternée (2017)
- To the Ends of the World (2018)
- Raoul Taburin (2029)
- Yao (2019, also writer and director)
- Perfect Nanny (Chanson douce) (2019)
- Beautiful Minds (Presque) (2021)
- Le Clan (2023)
