= The Price of Money: A Largo Winch Adventure =

2024 action thriller film

- Official poster
- Directed by: Olivier Masset-Depasse
- Written by: Giordano Gederlini; Domenico La Porta
- Screenplay by: Olivier Masset-Depasse; Giordano Gederlini; Domenico La Porta
- Based on: Largo Winch by: Philippe Francq; Jean Van Hamme
- Produced by: Jacques-Henri Bronckart; Nathalie Gastaldo Godeau
- Starring: Tomer Sisley; James Franco; Koen De Bouw; Narayan David Hecter; Sonia Vachon; Liliya Atanasove; Clotilde Hesme; Élise Tilloloy
- Cinematography: Glynn Speeckaert; Stéphane Vallée
- Edited by: Damien Keyeux
- Music by: Frédéric Vercheval
- Production companies: TF1 Group; RTBF; BeTV (Belgium); Canal+; Ciné+; Centre national du cinéma et de l'image animée; Pan Européenne Production
- Distributed by: O'Brother Distribution (Belgium); Pan Distribution (France)
- Release dates: July 31, 2024 (France); August 7, 2024 (Belgium); August 29, 2024 (Russia and Kuwait)
- Running time: 100 minutes
- Countries: France; Belgium
- Languages: French; English
- Budget: $17 million
- Box office: $3.8 million

The Price of Money: A Largo Winch Adventure (French: Largo Winch: Le Prix de l’argent) is a 2024 French action thriller film directed by Olivier Masset-Depasse and written by Giordano Gederlini and Domenico La Porta. The film was developed under the working title Largo Winch 3. It is the third installment in the Largo Winch film series, serving as a sequel to Largo Winch II (2011), and is based on the Belgian comic series of the same name by Jean Van Hamme and Philippe Francq. It stars Tomer Sisley as billionaire adventurer Largo Winch, reprising his role from the previous films, and James Franco as the main antagonist. The plot follows Winch as he searches for his kidnapped son while confronting a business conspiracy that threatens to destroy him. The Price of Money was released theatrically by O’Brother Distribution and Pan Distribution on 31 July 2024 in France, followed by releases in Belgium on 7 August 2024, and in Russia and Kuwait on 28 August 2024.

== Plot ==
In Canada, billionaire businessman Largo Winch (Tomer Sisley) oversees the multinational W Group while raising his teenage son Noom (David Hecter). During a live press conference announcing a major corporate restructuring, one of Largo’s longtime partners suddenly produces a firearm and commits suicide on camera. The incident shocks the public and causes an immediate collapse in W Group’s stock, plunging the company into financial chaos and placing Largo under intense media suspicion.

Shortly afterward, Noom is abducted while traveling under security supervision. Largo receives indirect warnings implying that his son will be killed if authorities are contacted. As police investigations stall, Largo realizes that the kidnapping coincides precisely with the engineered financial collapse of his company.

As W Group continues to lose assets, Largo uncovers evidence of deliberate market manipulation, shell corporations, and insider sabotage. Several board members resign or turn against him, claiming Largo’s leadership has become a liability. Believing the suicide and kidnapping to be connected, Largo abandons official channels and begins investigating on his own.

Largo’s search leads him into the remote Canadian wilderness, where he follows financial intermediaries linked to the conspiracy. He survives an attempted assassination, confirming that the forces targeting him intend to eliminate him permanently rather than merely ruin him financially.

Clues lead Largo to Burma (Myanmar), where W Group subsidiaries were previously involved in controversial mining operations. While navigating jungle terrain and hostile territory, Largo confronts mercenaries protecting illegal extraction sites. He uncovers documents proving that the W Group’s past activities are being weaponized to destroy him publicly.

From Burma, Largo travels to Bangkok, where financial transactions tied to the conspiracy are being laundered. There, he identifies Ezio Burntwood (James Franco), a powerful financier, as the architect behind the plot. Burntwood believes Largo’s refusal to fully exploit corrupt systems makes him dangerous to entrenched financial interests.

Burntwood is revealed to have coerced Largo’s business partner into suicide, using threats and manipulation to ensure maximum public damage. He also ordered Noom’s kidnapping to emotionally destabilize Largo and force him into submission.

Largo infiltrates Burntwood’s operation, engaging in multiple confrontations with hired operatives. As he dismantles the financial network sustaining the conspiracy, Burntwood’s influence begins to unravel. Largo exposes evidence tying Burntwood to market fraud, blackmail, and corporate sabotage.

In the climax, Largo directly confronts Burntwood, ensuring that proof of his crimes is released to authorities and the public. Burntwood’s financial empire collapses, and W Group regains partial stability under Largo’s control.

Although Largo succeeds in destroying the conspiracy against him, Noom is not immediately recovered. The film ends with Largo following the final trail leading to his son’s location, determined to rescue him.

== Cast ==
- Tomer Sisley as Largo Winch
- James Franco as Ezio Burntwood
- Koen De Bouw as Rudy Gessner
- Narayan David Hecter as Noom
- Denis O'Hare as Dwight Cochrane
- Sonia Vachon
- Liliya Atanasova as a cheering woman
- Clotilde Hesme as Chloé Riva
- Élise Tilloloy as Bonnie
- Supachai Girdsuwan as Chief Arun
- Banyong Phoonsap as Kao Shen
- Jonathan Sawdon as Olsen
- Méabh Mc Mahon as the journalist

== Production ==
Pre-production on The Price of Money began following the release of Largo Winch II (2011). The screenplay was written by Olivier Masset-Depasse, Giordano Gederlini, and Domenico La Porta, and is based on the Largo Winch comics by Jean Van Hamme and Philippe Francq, drawing from the volumes Le Prix de l’argent and La Loi du dollar. Olivier Masset-Depasse directed the film, succeeding Jérôme Salle, who directed the first two installments.

The production was financed by a combination of French and Belgian companies and film funds, including Pan Cinéma, Versus Production, TF1 Films Production, and RTBF, along with regional audiovisual support. Principal photography began on 6 February 2023 in Bulgaria, where much of the filming took place. Additional filming occurred in Thailand and Belgium. Production continued through late June 2023.

Tomer Sisley reprised his role as Largo Winch from the previous two films, while James Franco portrayed the antagonist Ezio Burntwood. The supporting cast includes Clotilde Hesme and Élise Tilloloy.

== Release ==
The film premiered in Paris on 18 June 2024 and was released theatrically in France on 31 July 2024. The film subsequently opened in Belgium on 7 August 2024, followed by additional international releases, including in Russia and Kuwait on 29 August 2024. The release was staggered across various territories throughout mid to late 2024.

== Reception ==
The film grossed 3.8 million worldwide against an estimated budget of $17 million.
