= Yao (film) =

2018 film

- Theatrical release poster
- Directed by: Philippe Godeau
- Written by: Agnès de Sacy; Philippe Godeau; Kossi Efoui
- Produced by: Philippe Godeau; Omar Sy
- Starring: Omar Sy; Lionel Basse
- Cinematography: Jean-Marc Fabre
- Edited by: Hervé de Luze
- Music by: Matthieu Chedid
- Production company: Pan-Européenne
- Distributed by: Pathé
- Release dates: 9 December 2018 (Saint-Louis); 23 January 2019 (France and Senegal)
- Running time: 103 min
- Countries: France; Senegal
- Languages: French; Wolof

Yao is a 2018 comedy-drama film directed by Philippe Godeau. It was written by Godeau and Agnès de Sacy in collaboration with Kossi Efoui.

== Cast ==
- Omar Sy as Seydou Tall
- Lionel Basse as Yao, le garçon
- Fatoumata Diawara as Gloria
- Germaine Acogny as Tanam
- Gwendolyn Gourvenec as Laurence Tall
- Alibéta as the taxi driver
