= Maud Forget =

French actress (born 1982)

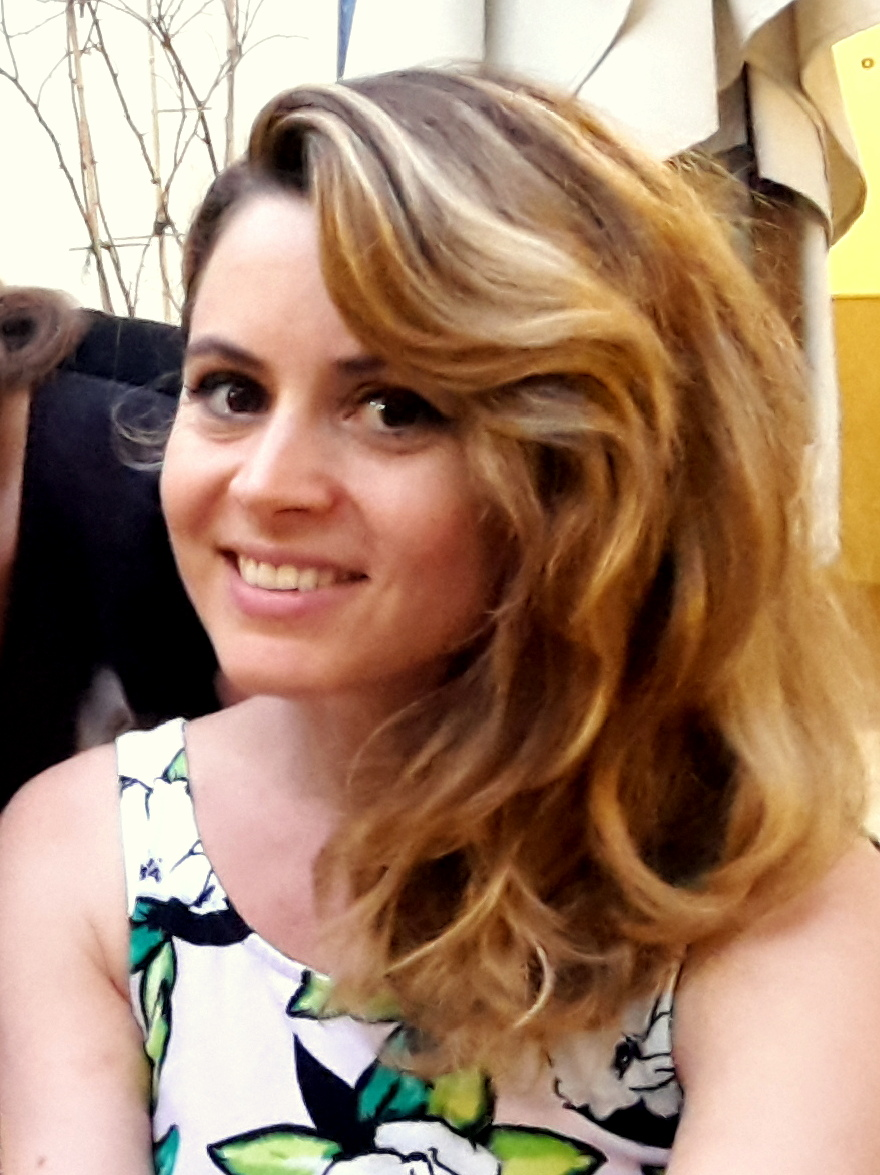
- Maud Forget in Avignon 2016
- Born: 7 May 1982 (age 44); Saint-Claude, Jura, France
- Occupation: Actress
- Years active: 1997-present

Maud Forget (born 7 May 1982) is a French actress best known for her roles in "Mauvaises fréquentations" (1999, "Bad Company"), and "La vie promise" (2002, "Ghost River"/"The Promised Life") opposite Isabelle Huppert and Pascal Greggory. She has also starred in other films such as "Tu ne marcheras jamais seul" and "U" (voice acting), and in several short films and television productions.

In her latest effort, Forget portrays one of the leading characters in the movie "Frontier(s)", directed by Xavier Gens.

== Filmography ==
=== Cinema ===
- 1999 : Mauvaises fréquentations / Bad Company, directed by Jean-Pierre Améris : Delphine Vitrac
- 2001 : Tu ne marcheras jamais seul, directed by Gilles Chevalier
- 2002 : La Vie promise, directed by Olivier Dahan
- 2006 : U, cartoon directed by Serge Élissalde and Grégoire Solotareff
- 2007 : Frontier(s), directed by Xavier Gens
- 2008 : Fracassés, directed by Franck Llopis
- 2011 : Augustine, short movie directed by Jean-Claude Monod and Jean-Christophe Valtat
- 2017 : Silhouette, short movie directed by Bertrand Cazor

=== Film director ===
- 2014 : (En)Vie, short movie

=== Television ===
- 2001 : Paranoïa, directed by Patrick Poubel : Lucie
- 2001 : Comme une allumette], directed by Clémence Jean-Jean
- 2001 : Hansel et Gretl, directed by Cyril Paris
- 2002 : Le cauchemar de Clara, directed by Douglas Law
- 2004 : Clau Clau l'oiseau, directed by Cyril Paris
- 2005 : Venus et Apollon, directed by Tonie Marshall
- 2006 : Fotographik, directed by Xavier Gens
- 2006 : Fabien Cosma, directed by Jean-Claude Sussfeld
- 2006 : Alice Nevers : le juge est une femme, directed by Joyce Bunuel
- 2007 : H.B. Human Bomb - Maternelle en otage, directed by Patrick Poubel
- 2009 : Comprendre et pardonner, directed by Michel Hassan
- 2010 : Merci papa, merci maman, directed by Vincent Giovanni
- 2011 : Prunelle et Mélodie, directed by Mathieu Simonet
- 2012 : La ballade de Lucie, directed by Sandrine Ray
- 2012 : Pari, directed by Jovanka Sopalovic
- 2013 : Le café des veuves, directed by Geoffroy Koeberlé
- 2013 : Origines, season 1, directed by Jérôme Navarro
- 2015 : Origines, season 2, directed by Nicolas Herdt
- 2018 : Art of Crime, Une ombre au tableau

== Theatre ==
- 2005 : L'autre ou le jardin oublié, directed by Patrice Paris, théâtre Montmartre-Galabru Paris
- 2008 : Adam et Eve, directed by Eric Théobald, théâtre de la Gaîté-Montparnasse Paris
- 2016 : Résistantes, by Franck Monsigny, directed by Stanislas Grassian, Théâtre Le Petit Louvre Festival off d'Avignon
