= Pierre-Emmanuel Le Goff =

Pierre-Emmanuel Le Goff (born 18 March 1979 in Rennes, France) is a French director, producer and distributor.

After a law degree from the University of Western Brittany, Pierre-Emmanuel Le Goff completed his studies with a 'Master in achieving' obtained in 2003 at the International Institute of Image and Sound led to time by Robert Caplain. Include graduates that year Nassim Amaouche, Marie-Eve Signeyrole and Julien Darras. His graduation film, the average film # 0 copy, co-directed with Julien Roussiaux, will be presented at the Short Film Corner at Cannes festival selected Molodist Kiev.

In 2003, after participating in the shooting of the feature film "Hanoi Honey Moon" by Xavier Menger in Vietnam as chief operator, Pierre-Emmanuel Le Goff is in charge of developing the video department of the concert hall in Paris and then Glazart the Divan du Monde and participates in the uptake of concerts and interview artists (Bashung Keziah Jones, Brisa Roché, April, Marcel and his orchestra ...). It combines the following year Alexander Gilles Merlet and the collective D2V Vidal Productions (Delirium live) Vjaying specializes in luxury and events while beginning to work as a director with the company The New Messengers.

In 2004 he co-wrote the contemporary circus performance "The Lighthouse" with Boris Gibe who gets the Beaumarchais Foundation Fellowship, the talented young circus price and price of the city of Paris.

A few months later, he approaches the fiction while working as an assistant director on several movies and clips (you Unite! Nadia El Fani, Philip Barrassat necrophiliac The Da Vinci Code Ron Howard ...) He realizes at that time his first documentary behind the scenes of the play '"Everything changes" to Oivier Lucas' (released with the DVD) and many corporate videos and clips.

In 2005, he was named 'communication director of the IECI' (European Institute Intergenerational Film) company he founded with Christopher Valley, Manon Poudoulec, Benoist Allard, Yvon Crenn (producer and production manager of Chabrol Kieslowski, Costa Gavras, Téchiné ...), Bruno Deloison (director of Canal Sat) and society Transpalux Didier Diaz. The institute is intended to discover and train directors of more than 50 years in a desire to intergenerational transmission. Based company which Erquy and training sites are divided between the Castle and the lighthouse Bienassis Cape Freels began its activity in forming including employees of France Televisions but following the reform of advertising on public service, society is in bankruptcy from three years in office.

In 2007, Pierre-Emmanuel Le Goff wrote the script The Little Brother experience of dealing with his uncle during the war in Algeria. The scenario will be shortlisted for the prize for best screenplay SOPADIN 2008 and will receive the Price Equinoxe 2008. The same year, he directed the documentary "The Cruise of the headlights" recounting his trip as a deckhand on the legendary sailboat Belem organized by the National Society for the Protection of Lighthouses and Beacons.

In 2008, he continued his activities director including working for the webtv Council of Val de Marne and leading negotiations for the sale of previously unseen footage of the documentary "John Rambo McCain, the great illusion" of Daniel Roussel (war correspondent Log humanity during the Vietnam War) in the Journal of 20 Hours of France 2.

In 2009, he founded the company SlumberLand Factory, with Cyril Cadars, Marcos Serrano, Raphael Barbant (collective Irons) and Frédéric Felder (aka Franky Ballony, actor and comic book artist, President of Hammerheads) and product the film 'amazed "Alice marvels"' Marie-Eve Signeyrole.

In a video of buzz launched January 27, 2009, Pierre-Emmanuel Le Goff and Cyril Cadars, "start-haired" and invite users to the dress to finance the film turns to Mecavnik in March 2009, the Serbian village of Emir Kusturica, who himself took part in the adventure as an actor. Within months, more than '1000 "smaller producers in the world" 'fully fund the film to the tune of 45,000 euros, plus 20,000 euros of corporate partnerships. In exchange, the film crew has the name of "producers" in the credits, access to raw footage and making of every night of the shooting, a bottle of wine Serbian (The vintage "Alice"), or even a chair manufacturer on the set for more than 1500 euros soucriptions. November 21, the film is projected at Max Linder cinema) Paris to over 600 "Smaller producers in the world". The film, directed by Marie-Eve Signeyrole, will eventually be the only French short film selected in the category of Leopard at the Locarno festival tomorrow and will receive many other awards. (Albi, Kiev, Bratislava ...).

The same year he participated in the filming of Villemolle 81 of Winshluss, aka Vincent Parronaud, zombie film shot in the Tarn and acts as a consultant on the web documentary "Eyes in green" Karine Niego.

In 2010, he co-produced web documentary "Iranianstories". This web documentary, co-authored with Thibault Lefevre and Louis Racine, call witnesses and actors of the protest movement called "Green Revolution" in Tehran. The project, sponsored by the Nobel Peace Prize Shirin Ebadi of Iran, supported by the FIDH (International Federation of Human Rights), The LIDDH (Iranian League for Human Right), The French League of Human Rights and the house of journalists, has the support of the CNC Innovative formats and new media Beaumarchais Orange Prize 2009 and will be broadcast in partnership with Mediapart and The Swiss newspaper Le Temps. In 2010, Iranian stories is selected for the France 24's web documentary and Videos Cross Days and was presented at conferences including the Forum des Images and the City Hall of Paris.

The same year, he acts as consultant for the development of the computer 'Ecoprod' to measure the environmental impact of filming. (In partnership with ADEME, TF1, France Televisions, the Film Commission France ...)

In 2011, Pierre-Emmanuel Le Goff worked as scriptdoctor to documentary projects developed by Image Media City and served as director of the cast of '(film) "Donoma" 'Djinn Carrénard and develops the DONOMA GUERILLA TOUR, tour of the film crew on a bus in the colors of the film on a journey of nearly 10,000 km around France. The film, made for 150 euros will receive a very significant media coverage and will be sold at ARTE. In 2011, the film won the Prix Louis Delluc for best first film. Early 2012, the film is over 25 000 entries at the box office.

The same year, Pierre-Emmanuel Le Goff makes three short films as part of the series Proverbs created by Benedict Brunet. supported by the CNC, the Ministry of Culture, the General Delegation for the French language, and winner of the Orange Beaumarchais innovative formats. '"A mighty heart"' Sarah Hamour and Sylvain will Girves winner of Season 2 of proverbs and selected festival Grignan chaired by Patrice Leconte '"Hibaku"' which deals with the consequences of the disaster will cost Fukushima coupde heart of Season 3 chaired by Jan Kounen '"Princely Proverb"' which evokes the Little Prince

== Awards ==
- COPY # 0 (short film): selection Molodist Festival of Kiev - The Lighthouse (contemporary circus performance): Young Talent Prize Cirque 2004, Prize of the City of Paris in 2004, Beaumarchais Exchange - The Little Brother (scenario feature film): Screening for Best Screenplay Award SOPADIN 2008/2008 Price Equinox - Iranian Stories (web documentary): Orange Prize 2010 Beaumarchais innovative formats, selection of Price webdocumenaire France 24 - A stout heart (short subject): First Prize Season 2 Contest Proverbs, short film festival selection of Grignan - Hibaku (short subject): Price favorite Season 3 contest Proverbs

== Figuration ==
- The nurse of the psychiatric hospital in "Villemolle .81" Winshluss aka Vincent Parronaud - The death of Emir Kusturica's shoulders in "Alice is amazed" by Marie-Eve Signeyrole
