= Kossi =

Kossi may refer to:

- Kossi Province

it is also a name:

- Kossi Agassa (Togo football player)
- Heikki Kossi (The Autocrats)
- Kossi Efoui (writer)
