= The Price to Pay (film) =

- Theatrical release poster
- Directed by: Alexandra Leclère
- Written by: Alexandra Leclère
- Produced by: Philippe Godeau
- Starring: Christian Clavier; Nathalie Baye
- Cinematography: Jean-François Robin
- Edited by: Hervé de Luze
- Music by: Philippe Eidel
- Production company: Pan-Européenne
- Distributed by: Wild Bunch Distribution
- Release date: 4 April 2007 (France)
- Running time: 95 minutes
- Country: France
- Language: French

The Price to Pay (French: Le Prix à payer) is a 2007 French comedy film directed by Alexandra Leclère.

== Cast ==
- Christian Clavier as Jean-Pierre Ménard
- Nathalie Baye as Odile Ménard
- Gérard Lanvin as Richard
- Géraldine Pailhas as Caroline
- Patrick Chesnais as Grégoire
- Anaïs Demoustier as Justine Ménard
