= La vie promise =

- Directed by: Olivier Dahan
- Written by: Olivier Dahan; Agnès Fustier-Dahan
- Produced by: Éric Névé
- Starring: Isabelle Huppert
- Cinematography: Alex Lamarque
- Edited by: Richard Marizy
- Distributed by: BAC Films
- Release date: 4 September 2002
- Running time: 93 minutes
- Country: France
- Language: French

La vie promise is a 2002 French film directed by Olivier Dahan, written by Olivier Dahan and Agnès Fustier-Dahan, and starring by Isabelle Huppert, Pascal Greggory and Maud Forget.

== Main cast ==
- Isabelle Huppert as Sylvia
- Pascal Greggory as Joshua
- Maud Forget as Laurence
- Fabienne Babe as Sandra
- André Marcon as Piotr
- Louis-Do de Lencquesaing as Maquereau 1

== Plot ==
Sylvia, a not-so-young woman, is working as a prostitute in Nice. She has a painful relationship with her daughter, Laurence. When two pimps attack Sylvia in her apartment, Laurence stabs one of them, perhaps fatally, to defend her mother. Sylvia and Laurence go on the run. They begin a journey as hitchhikers, first trying to track down Sylvia's first husband, Piotr, who had a son with her, eight years ago. Sylvia desperately hopes to resume her marriage with Piotr. Sylvia and Laurence cross paths with Joshua, a man out on bail who decides not to return to prison and is trying to avoid the police. Joshua drives off with Sylvia's handbag by mistake. Sylvia and Laurence also separate. Sylvia continues her search for Piotr, occasionally trading sex in exchange for rides, and sometimes on foot to the point of collapse. Sylvia eventually discovers that Piotr has moved from the village where they used to live. After long, painful wanderings, Sylvia, Joshua and Laurence eventually reunite. Sylvia still wants to track down Piotr. A visit to Sylvia's grandparents leads them to the burned-out house where Sylvia once lived with Piotr. Sylvia eventually finds Piotr and her son, but Piotr has found a new, young wife, who is expecting a daughter. Sylvia leaves them to their lives together. She returns to Laurence and Joshua, who has indicated a desire to go his separate way. He does, but returns. Sylvia, Laurence and Joshua leave France together.

== See also ==
- Isabelle Huppert on screen and stage
