= Bedwin Hacker =

- Directed by: Nadia El Fani
- Written by: Nadia El Fani
- Starring: Sonia Hamza, Muriel Solvay, Tomer Sisley, Nadi Saiji, Xavier Desplas
- Cinematography: Tarek Ben Abdallah
- Edited by: Juliette Hautbois and Claude Reznik
- Music by: Milton Edouard
- Release date: 2003
- Running time: 99 min
- Country: Tunisia
- Languages: Arabic and French

Bedwin Hacker is a Tunisian film about a computer hacker and TV pirate who broadcasts messages promoting freedom and equality for North Africans, and the attempt by the French Direction de la surveillance du territoire to find her and stop her. The film breaks several stereotypes of typical Tunisian cinema, by focusing on mobility issues in 21st century Tunisia.

== Plot summary ==
The film opens with a pirate transmission of a cartoon camel superimposed over a speech by president Truman about nuclear power. The piracy originates in a remote location in North Africa based on the handiwork of a 'lone wolf' hacker, Kalt, working with her young acquaintance who calls her 'auntie'.

Kalt then rescues her illegal immigrant friend Frida from the clutches of French immigration in Paris by hacking the immigration computers. Kalt meets a journalist named Chams. Escaping the situation there, which includes police raids on immigrant meetings, they flee back to Tunisia.

In Tunisia Kalt resumes her pirate transmissions. Throughout the film we see various European TV broadcasts interrupted by her transmissions of the camel and messages of freedom and equality for North Africans:

"In the third millennium there are other epochs, other places, other lives. We are not a mirage."

Somewhere inside the French DST, Julia, her boss, and agent Zbor try to track down the transmissions and stop them.

Julia happens to be the girlfriend of Chams, and she attempts to use him to infiltrate Kalt's supposed terrorist circle and bring her down. Chams is conflicted but complies with her commands. He puts on a ruse of interviewing the old man who owns the house where Kalt and his family live.

The old man is a poet and we hear snippets of his philosophical and artistic poetry espousing the value of freedom, which Chams ignores as he tries to find out the secrets of Kalt's life. He attempts to help Julia put a trojan horse onto Kalt's machine but Kalt has put in safeguards that stop him and reveal his treachery to her.

During flashbacks we learn that Julia believes the mysterious hacker to be the Pirate Mirage, who may also be her old acquaintance from École Polytechnique, which is, indeed, Kalt. A flashback shows them working on computers in their younger days as well as being lovers.

Kalt's friends accompany Frida to a music concert she is putting on. They are stopped by the Tunisian police who are working with the French authorities, but they are waved through

At one point the Camel tells the viewers to call a telephone number. Somehow this shuts down power to a section of Paris called La Défense. After this, the government pressure on Julia's department becomes intense as millions of dollars are spent trying to put out disinformation about the Bedwin Hacker as well as track her down.

As the DST closes in on Kalt, Chams becomes more and more conflicted, telling Julia that there are no terrorists in Kalt's circle, while simultaneously arguing to Kalt that she is endangering herself and that she should stop hijacking the TV signal.

Julia, driven by her boss and by the thrill, finally tracks down Kalt's location and confronts her, just as Kalt is planning to transmit her last signal and then destroy all evidence of her work.

== Music ==
The music in the film tends to be modernistic Arabic with influences from hip hop and dance beats. There are also scenes of traditional music and protest music/folk music being played in a group or family setting.

== See also ==
- Arab Spring
- Hackers (film)
- Cyberpunk
