= Le Garçu =

- Directed by: Maurice Pialat
- Written by: Sylvie Danton; Maurice Pialat
- Produced by: Philippe Godeau; Gérard Louvin
- Starring: Gérard Depardieu
- Cinematography: Jean-Claude Larrieu; Myriam Touzé
- Edited by: Hervé de Luze
- Distributed by: Pan-Européenne Distribution
- Release date: 31 October 1995
- Running time: 102 minutes
- Country: France
- Language: French
- Box office: $428

Le Garçu (English: "The Boy") is a 1995 French drama film directed by Maurice Pialat and starring Gérard Depardieu. It tells the story of a man experiencing a midlife crisis after becoming a father later in life. Pialat had himself become a father at the age of 65, and cast his real-life son, Antoine, as the protagonist's son.

Le Garçu was Pialat's final work. The director was dissatisfied with the film and even planned to re-edit it, but his failing health made that impossible.

== Plot ==
Gérard, a middle-aged, emotionally immature man, lives with Sophie, his second and much younger wife, and their four-year-old son Antoine, whom he adores. During a family holiday in Mauritius, Sophie grows exasperated by Gérard’s juvenile behavior, ultimately abandoning him to return to Paris with their child.

Since Sophie kept their apartment, Gérard is given a room to sleep in by his first wife, Micheline. Seeking companionship, he reconnects with Cathy, a former mistress, much to Micheline's anger. Hoping for a reconciliation, Gérard later rejoins Sophie and Antoine for a holiday in Les Sables-d'Olonne, where they meet up with Jeannot and his partner. Jeannot's girlfriend has a one-night-stand with Gérard, while Jeannot finds himself deeply drawn to Sophie.

Eventually, Jeannot moves in with Sophie, stepping into the role of a stable caretaker for young Antoine. However, when a hospital in Auvergne calls to announce that Gérard's father ("le garçu" in the local dialect) is on his deathbed, Sophie accompanies her estranged husband to his hometown without hesitation. Her emotional support bridges the distance between them; however, Gérard remains incapable of truly growing up while Jeannot has cemented his role as a father figure to the child.

== Cast ==
- Gérard Depardieu as Gérard
- Géraldine Pailhas as Sophie
- Antoine Pialat as Antoine
- Dominique Rocheteau as Jeannot
- Fabienne Babe as Cathy
- Élisabeth Depardieu as Micheline
- Claude Davy as Le Garçu
- Isabelle Costacurta as Isabelle

== Filming ==
Le Garçu was filmed in Paris, Auvergne, Les Sables-d'Olonne, and Mauritius.

== Release ==
The film was screened at the New York Film Festival on 30 September 1996. In 2005, Le Garçu was screened at Dryden Theatre.
