= Garde alternée =

- Theatrical release poster
- Directed by: Alexandra Leclère
- Written by: Alexandra Leclère
- Produced by: Philippe Godeau
- Starring: Valérie Bonneton; Didier Bourdon; Isabelle Carré
- Cinematography: Jean-Marc Fabre
- Edited by: Andrea Sedláčková
- Music by: Mathieu Lamboley
- Production company: Pan-Européenne
- Distributed by: Wild Bunch
- Release date: 20 December 2017
- Running time: 104 minutes
- Country: France
- Language: French
- Box office: $3.9 million

Garde alternée is a 2017 French comedy film directed by Alexandra Leclère.

== Plot ==
A woman discovers that her husband has a mistress. She will then propose to the latter to share their life with her husband alternating one week out of two.

== Cast ==
- Didier Bourdon: Jean
- Valérie Bonneton: Sandrine
- Isabelle Carré: Virginie
- Laurent Stocker: Michel
- Michel Vuillermoz: Félix
- Hélène Vincent: Sandrine's mother
- Jackie Berroyer: Sandrine's father
- Lise Lamétrie: The teacher

== Production ==
Principal photography on the film began in April 2017 in Paris and ended in June 2017.
