= An Independent Life =

An Independent Life (Самостоятельная жизнь)
- Directed by: Vitali Kanevsky
- Written by: Vitali Kanevsky
- Produced by: Philippe Godeau
- Starring: Pavel Nazarov
- Cinematography: Vladimir Brylyakov
- Music by: Boris Rychkov
- Release date: 1992
- Running time: 97 minutes
- Country: Russia
- Language: Russian

An Independent Life (Russian: Самостоятельная жизнь, translit. Samostoyatelnaya zhizn) is a 1992 Russian film directed by Vitali Kanevsky. It is the second in a trilogy of autobiographical films. The film was an international co-production between companies in Russia, France and the UK, including StudioCanal and PolyGram Filmed Entertainment. It tied with Dream of Light to win the Jury Prize, the third most prestigious award of the event, at the Cannes Film Festival in 1992.

== Plot ==
The sequel of the “Freeze, Die, Come, to Life!,” this is drama tells the story of life in a provincial city at the sunset of the Stalinist period of the Soviet Union. The story picks up where the previous film in the trilogy left off: 1950s in Partizansk, a small mining town in the Soviet Far East. Three years after the death of Galya - the heroine of the previous film - protagonist Valerka falls in love with her sister. Already an adult, an independent person, his whole life lies ahead as he begins to navigate his newfound independence and falling in love.

== Cast ==
- Pavel Nazarov - Valerka
- Dinara Drukarova - Valya
- Toshihiro Vatanabe - Yamamoto
- Yelena Popova - Valerka's Mother
- Lyana Zhvaniya - (as Liana Jvania)
- M. Aleksandrov
- Yelena Antonova - (as Ye. Antonova)
- Aleksandr Aleksandrov - (as A. Alexandrov)
- L. Dorotenko
- Natalya Ipatova
- Vladimir Ivanov - (as V. Ivanov)
- Yelizaveta Zhukova - (as Elisaveta Joukova)
- Tatyana Ivanova - (as T. Ivanova)
- N. Kharitonov
- A. Kopustin - (as A. Kopoustine)

== Awards ==
It was entered into the 1992 Cannes Film Festival, where it won the Jury Prize. It was also nominated for the Golden Bear at the 42nd Berlin International Film Festival.
