= Alibéta =

Senegalese musician, writer and filmmaker (born 1983)

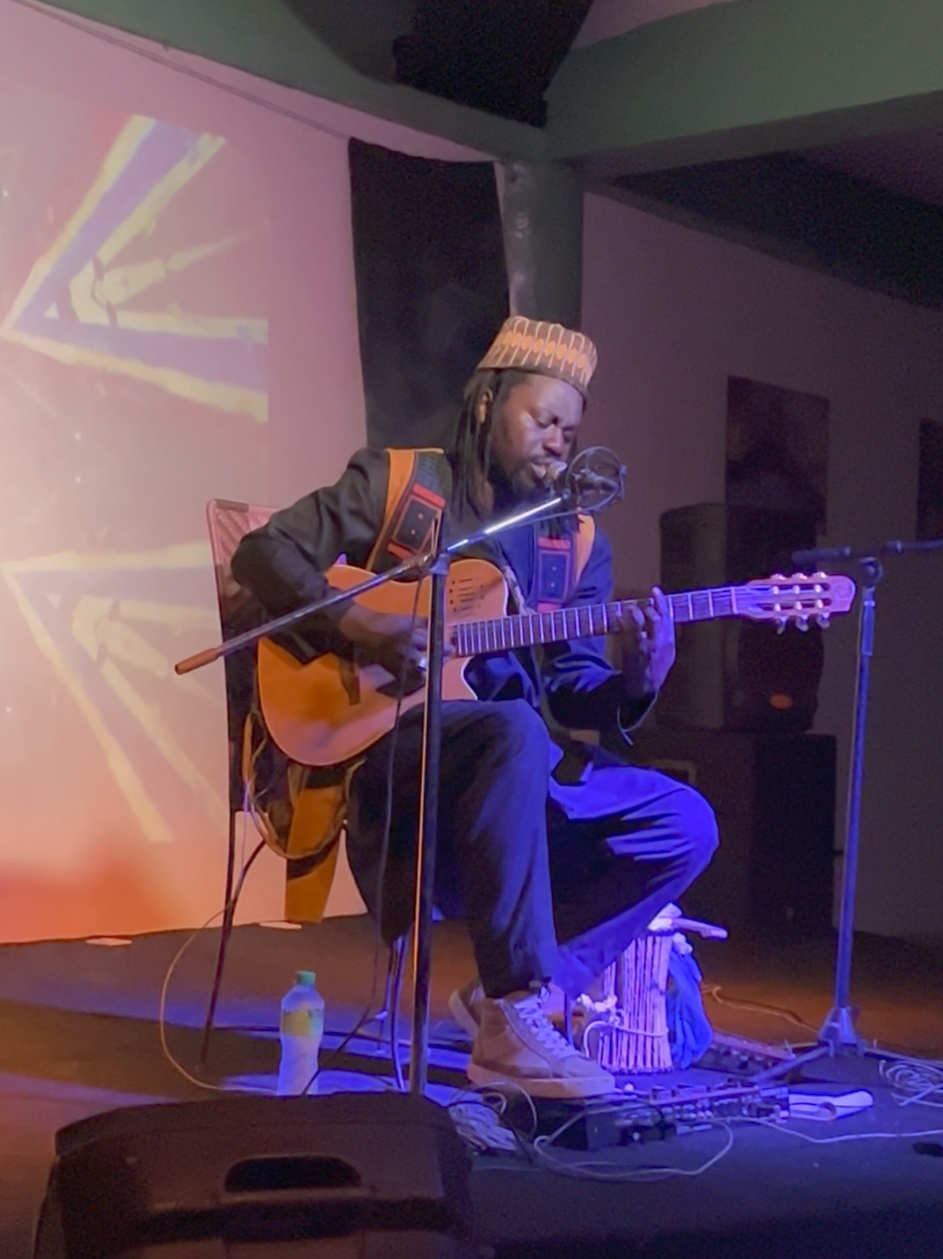
- Saliou Waa Guendoum Sarr aka Alibéta at a concert in Dakar, March 2024
- Born: Saliou Waa Guendoum Sarr; 12 March 1983 (age 43); Tambacounda, Senegal
- Occupations: musician; filmmaker; writer; composer; performer
- Years active: 1994–present
- Notable work: Ñun (album), Gòor Gòorlu (single), Wiri Wiri (single) Doxandeem, les chasseurs des rêves (film), Life Saraba Illégal (film), Masques Désmasqués (film)
- Website: alibeta.net

Saliou Waa Guendoum Sarr known as Alibéta (born 12 March 1983 in Tambacounda, Senegal) is a multidisciplinary Senegalese musician, filmmaker, writer, composer, and performer. He is from a family of musicians, including Felwine Sarr and Sahad Sarr and grew up in the Saloum Islands, in Niodior, Senegal. He adopted the artist name Alibéta, an anagram of Talibé, as he identifies as a seeker, researcher and traveler. He founded the community-led cultural initiatives and spaces KENU Lab'Oratoire and Artiste du Daanu in the neighborhood of Ouakam in Dakar.

== Education ==
Alibéta began playing music at the age of 11, learning the basics from his older brother. During his secondary school years, he joined the English club choir, started composing his own songs and performed on stage. While studying at Cheikh Anta Diop University, he became involved in theater, merging performance and music. He later coached the theater troupe of Lamine Gueye High School and directed productions including Bwakamambé and Akiboulane, an adaptation of Une Saison au Congo by Aimé Césaire. At university, he also participated in a theatrical research workshop, where he was mentored by playwrights Lucien Lemoine and Jacqueline Lemoine.

== Music ==
He is a multi-instrumentalist, primarily playing the guitar, vocals, the flute and gimbri. He has released several singles, including Wiri Wiri and Gòor Gòorlu. His album Ñun explores themes of connection, ancestry and community.l

Alibéta's music is rooted in African traditions while fusing global influences. He describes his style as 'Man Groove', a blend of Sérère and Bambara musical heritage with elements of jazz, hip-hop, reggae, blues and Afrobeat. His work incorporates sounds and stories from Senegal, Mali and Mauritania. Through his lyrics, he promotes unity, self-awareness, and social consciousness, advocating for a world beyond racial, religious, and national divisions.

Along with Ibaaku, a Senegalese multidisciplinary artist who blends electronic and experimental music with whom Alibéta shares a history of collaborations, he created the independent label Miziku Tey Records.

== Film work ==
Alibéta began filmmaking to 'reshape perceptions of Africa and its youth'. Alibéta's films explore themes of identity, migration, and cultural heritage, often blending documentary and fiction. Through collaborations with African and European filmmakers, he emphasizes the importance of African-led storytelling. Alibéta has also pursued acting, notably appearing as the taxi driver in the 2018 film "Yao" alongside Omar Sy, Fatoumata Diawara and Germaine Acogny.

=== Masques Démasqués ===
He directed Masques Démasqués (2008) in Mali's Dogon country in partnership with Deutsche Welle and Coup de Filet (2011), a film on fishing and immigration, presented at the World Social Forum. He continues to work on new projects, favoring documentaries to challenge stereotypes and provide fresh perspectives on Africa.

=== Life Saraba Illégal ===
He spent eight years documenting the journey of two young men migrating to Europe for the documentary Life Saraba Illégal, which was released in 2015. The film explores the journey of brothers Aladji and Souley from a small fishing island off the coast of Senegal, as they chase the dream of reaching Europe, known in West Africa as Saaraba, the "promised land."

=== Doxandeem, les chasseurs de rêves ===
Alibéta's other film, Doxandeem, les chasseurs de rêves, is an 88-minute documentary film, released in 2023. It explores themes of identity, return, and the transformative effects of migration on individuals and their communities and portrays those who challenge norms and inspire societal change. It highlights migration as a fundamental human right and emphasizes the importance of free movement across borders. The concept of the doxandem (adventurer) is central to the film, The film features a significant musical component, with a soundtrack composed by Alibéta and Ibaaku.

== Cultural advocacy ==
Passionate about cultural policy, he advocates for greater investment in the arts as a driver of development. In recent years, he has focused on KENU Lab’Oratoire des Imaginaires, a collaboratively run interdisciplinary lab and Hub Artiste du Daanu, a community-led cultural hub and co-working space at the intersection of art, culture, entrepreneurship, and research in Dakar, Senegal.

In this context, he also works as an educator and curator to strengthen collectivity through the arts and develop communal ways of living.
