= Down by Love =

- Film poster
- Éperdument
- Directed by: Pierre Godeau
- Screenplay by: Pierre Godeau; Florent Gonçalves; Catherine Siguret
- Based on: Défense d'aimer by Florent Gonçalves
- Produced by: Philippe Godeau; Cyril Colbeau-Justin; Jean-Baptiste Dupont; Nathalie Gastaldo
- Starring: Guillaume Gallienne; Adèle Exarchopoulos
- Cinematography: Muriel Cravatte
- Edited by: Hervé de Luze
- Music by: Robin Coudert
- Production companies: Pan-Européenne; StudioCanal; France 2 Cinéma; LGM Productions; Appaloosa Distribution; Don't Be Shy Productions; Versus Production
- Distributed by: StudioCanal
- Release dates: 25 February 2016 (Paris premiere); 2 March 2016 (France)
- Running time: 110 minutes
- Country: France
- Language: French
- Box office: $50,828

Down by Love (French: Éperdument) is a 2016 French drama film directed by Pierre Godeau.

== Plot ==
Based on the life of Sorour Arbabzadeh and Florent Goncalves in 2010, a young woman, Anna Amari, is detained at a prison for women in Versailles, where she encounters Jean Firmino, the prison director. She is sentenced to nine years in prison and they begin an illegal relationship which brings the attention of the authorities onto them.

== Cast ==
- Guillaume Gallienne as Jean Firmino
- Adèle Exarchopoulos as Anna Amari
- Stéphanie Cléau as Elise Firmino
- Marie Rivière as Anna's mother
- Aliénor Poisson as Louise Firmino
- Cyrielle Martinez as Zoé
- Selma Mansouri as Sonia
- Sabila Moussadek as Aïda
- Julie Moulier as Pilar
- Marie Berto as Béatrice
- Amir El Kacem as Mam's
- Soumaye Bocoum as Mélanie
- Ahlem Lahouel as Ahlem
- Nade Dieu as The captain
- Anne Loiret as Anna's lawyer
- Maryline Even as Co-prisoner at Fleury
- Olivier Foubert as The teacher
- Aude Briant as The secretary

== Critical response ==
On review aggregator website Rotten Tomatoes, Down by Love has an approval rating of 40%, based on 10 reviews, with an average rating of 5/10.
