= Perfect Nanny (film) =

- French theatrical release poster
- Directed by: Lucie Borleteau
- Written by: Lucie Borleteau; Jérémie Elkaïm; Maïwenn
- Produced by: Pascal Caucheteux; Grégoire Sorlat; Philippe Godeau; Nathalie Gastaldo Godeau
- Starring: Karin Viard; Leïla Bekhti; Antoine Reinartz
- Cinematography: Alexis Kavyrchine
- Edited by: Laurence Briaud
- Music by: Pierre Desprats
- Production companies: Why Not Productions; Pan-Européenne; StudioCanal; France 3 Cinéma
- Distributed by: StudioCanal
- Release date: 3 October 2019
- Running time: 100 minutes
- Country: France
- Language: French
- Budget: $5.3 million
- Box office: $1.7 million

Perfect Nanny (French: Chanson douce; released as Lullaby in Canada, India, Ireland and the UK) is a 2019 French drama film based on the eponymous novel by Leïla Slimani.

Myriam, mother of two children, decides to return to her job at a law firm, against her husband's wishes. Despite this, the couple begins looking for a nanny. After interviewing several candidates, they ultimately hire Louise. She quickly becomes beloved by the children and gradually takes on a central, even unsettling, role within the family.

== Cast ==
- Karin Viard : Louise
- Leïla Bekhti : Myriam
- Antoine Reinartz : Paul
- Assya Da Silva : Mila
- Noëlle Renaude : Sylvie
- Jérémie Elkaïm & Sarah Suco : Diner's friend
- Martine Chevallier : The lady in the park
