= Beautiful Minds (film) =

2021 film

- Theatrical release poster
- French: Presque
- Directed by: Bernard Campan; Alexandre Jollien
- Written by: Hélène Grémillon; Alexandre Jollien; Bernard Campan
- Produced by: Philippe Godeau
- Starring: Bernard Campan; Alexandre Jollien
- Cinematography: Christophe Offenstein
- Edited by: Annette Dutertre
- Music by: Niklas Paschburg
- Production company: Pan Européenne
- Distributed by: Apollo Films
- Release date: 26 August 2021 (FFA)
- Running time: 92 min
- Countries: France; Switzerland
- Language: French

Beautiful Minds (French: Presque) is a 2021 French-Swiss comedy-drama film directed by Bernard Campan and Alexandre Jollien.

== Cast ==
- Bernard Campan as Louis Caretti
- Alexandre Jollien as Igor
- Marie Benati as la prostituée
- Marilyne Canto as Judith
- La Castou as la mère d'Igor
- Julie-Anne Roth as Nicole
- Tiphaine Daviot as Cathy
- Laëtitia Eïdo as Patricia
