= Bad Company (1999 film) =

1999 French film directed by Jean-Pierre Améris

- Theatrical release poster
- Directed by: Jean-Pierre Améris
- Written by: Alain Layrac
- Produced by: Philippe Godeau; Alain Sarde
- Starring: Maud Forget; Lou Doillon
- Cinematography: Yves Vandermeeren
- Edited by: Martine Giordano
- Production company: Pan-Européenne
- Distributed by: Universal Pictures France
- Release date: 20 October 1999
- Running time: 98 minutes
- Country: France
- Language: French
- Budget: $3.8 million
- Box office: $3.5 million

Bad Company (original title: Mauvaises Fréquentations) is a 1999 French film starring Maud Forget and Lou Doillon. It is a romantic drama about two young students falling in love. The movie is written by Alain Layrac, and directed by Jean-Pierre Améris. A few scenes from this movie are featured in a music video by Lene Marlin for her song, "Where I'm Headed".

== Cast ==
- Maud Forget – Delphine
- Lou Doillon – Olivia
- Robinson Stévenin – Laurent
- François Berléand – René
- Ariane Ascaride – Olivia's Mother
- Maxime Mansion – Alain
- Cyril Cagnat – Justin
- Delphine Rich – Claire

== Production ==
Alain Layrac, the screenwriter, said the casting lasted nine months with 2,000 auditions. "Due to the subject of the film, many have given up. The main actress, Maud Forget, had never done anything. And she carries the whole film on her shoulders. When she started the movie, she had never kissed a boy in her life! And she had to play prostitution scenes in a toilet. Many professional actresses had refused", he recalled.
