= La Castou =

Swiss singer, dancer, and actress (1948–2024)

- Born: Catherine Burkhardt; 30 August 1948; Saignelégier, Switzerland
- Died: 27 March 2024 (aged 75)
- Occupations: Singer; dancer; actress

Catherine Burkhardt (30 August 1948 – 27 March 2024), better known by the stage name La Castou, was a Swiss singer, dancer, and actress. She died from cancer on 27 March 2024, at the age of 75.

== Filmography ==
- Bulle (2020)
- Beautiful Minds (2021)

== Discography ==
- A Coups De Cœur (1983)
- Sorcière - En Public (1996)

== Distinctions ==
- Médaille d'or de la chanson (1975)
