= Largo Winch =

Belgian comic book series

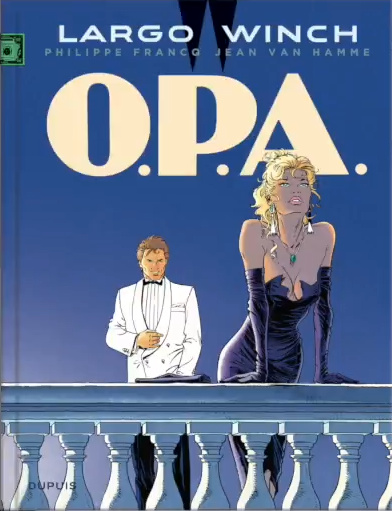
- Cover of the third album (translated to Takeover Bid)
- Created by: Philippe Francq; Jean Van Hamme

Publication information
- Publisher: Dupuis (French); Cinebook (English)
Title(s)
L'Héritier
Le Groupe W
O.P.A.
Business Blues
H
Dutch Connection
La Forteresse De Makiling
L'heure Du Tigre
Voir Venise...
...Et mourir
Golden Gate
Shadow
Le Prix De L'argent
La Loi du dollar
Les trois yeux des gardiens du Tao
La Voie et la vertu
- Formats: Original material for the series has been published as a set of graphic novels.
- Original language: French
- Genre: Action/adventure
- Main character(s): Largo Winch; Nerio Winch; John D. Sullivan; Dwight E. Cochrane; Simon Ovronnaz

Reprints
- The series has been reprinted, at least in part, in Danish, Dutch, English, German, Polish, Portuguese, Spanish, and Serbian.

Largo Winch is a Belgian comic book series by Philippe Francq and Jean Van Hamme, published by Dupuis. It started as a series of novels by Van Hamme in the late 1970s, but stopped due to a lack of success and the huge amount of work Van Hamme had in the meantime with his comic books (such as Thorgal). When artist Philippe Francq wanted to start a series with Van Hamme, he revived his old hero, and reworked the novels into the first albums of the comic book series. Later, more stories followed.

== Synopsis ==
The main character, Largo Winch

The main character is Largo Winch; birth name Largo Winczlav, who was born in Yugoslavia. Other important characters include Nerio Winch (his adoptive father, though they share a great-grandparent), senior Group W executives John D. Sullivan and Dwight E. Cochrane, and his friend Simon Ovronnaz. In the first two volumes of the series, L'héritier and Le Groupe W, Largo, a young and handsome orphan, is propelled to the head of a business empire, Group W (of no relation to the real-life broadcasting division of American conglomerate Westinghouse Electric Corporation), after his adoptive father Nerio is murdered, and goes through a lot of troubles to preserve his inheritance and avenge Nerio. The following albums are more or less based on the same basic plot: someone is trying to harm Largo's company or to take control of it from him, and he has to fight that someone to ensure the survival of his holdings. Almost every story arc involves corrupt authority figures of a type which Nerio easily manipulated, but Largo confronts from the viewpoint of an "everyman".

All the stories of the series are published in two volumes, the first one being the one putting Largo in an impossible situation, and the second one letting him get out of it. In addition, both volumes share the same background color on the cover. The stories appear originally in French, and have been translated into various languages, including Croatian, Danish, Dutch, English, German, Greek, Polish, Portuguese, Serbian, Slovenian, Spanish, Swedish, Italian and Tamil. The series is among the most popular comics series in French, with annual sales of nearly 500,000 copies.

== History ==
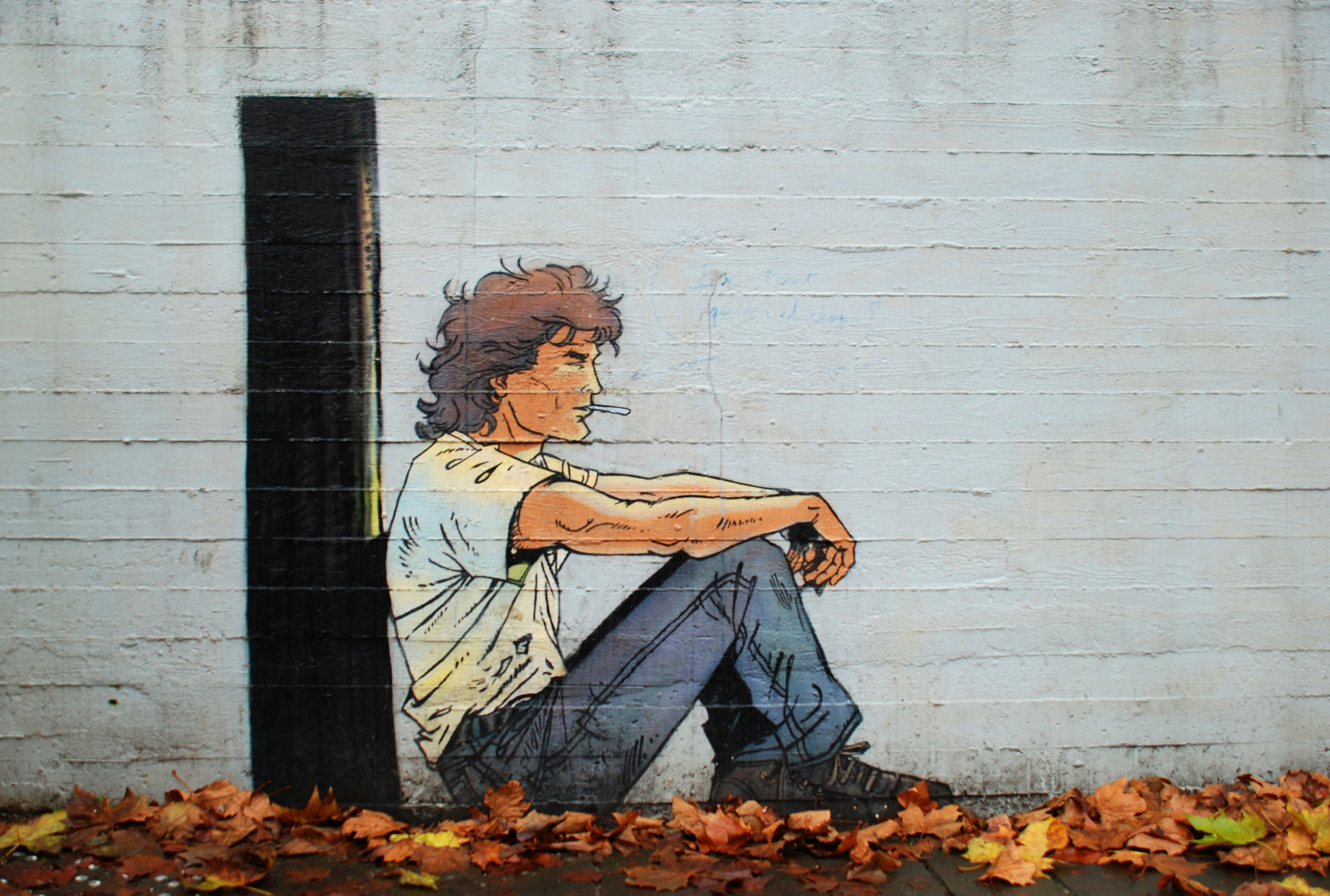
Largo Winch mural on the Place des Sciences in Louvain-la-Neuve (Belgium).

The birth of the character came in 1973, while Van Hamme was having lunch in New York City with Greg, chief editor of Tintin. The magazine sought to expand to the American market and Van Hamme was tasked with creating the comic character and genre interesting for an American audience. He thus opted for a business-thriller idea about a young mysterious billionaire, which would allow him to demonstrate his knowledge of economics. John Prentice, noted for his work on Rip Kirby, was chosen as the artist, and he drew a couple of boards before withdrawing from the project that was soon abandoned. Van Hamme first revived the character in form of an airport novel in 1978, encouraged by the huge popularity of Gérard de Villiers' SAS novels. The series lasted through 1985 when it came to a halt again. Finally, in 1990, being approached by Francq, Van Hamme used the character yet again in comic form, and it had instant success.

== Issues ==
1. "L'Héritier" (1990)
2. "Le Groupe W" (1991)
3. "O.P.A." (1992)
4. "Business Blues" (1993)
5. "H" (1994)
6. "Dutch Connection" (1995)
7. "La Forteresse De Makiling" (1996)
8. "L'Heure du Tigre" (1997)
9. "Voir Venise..." (1998)
10. "...Et mourir" (1999)
11. "Golden Gate" (2000)
12. "Shadow" (2002)
13. "Le Prix de l'Argent" (2004)
14. "La Loi du Dollar" (2005)
15. "Les Trois Yeux des Gardiens du Tao" (2007)
16. "La Voie et la Vertu" (2008)
17. "Mer Noire" (2010)
18. "Colère Rouge" (2012)
19. "Chassé-Croisé" (2014)
20. "20 Secondes" (2015)
21. "L'Étoile du Matin" (2017)
22. "Les Voiles Écarlates" (2019)
23. "La Frontière de la Nuit" (2021)
24. "Le Centile d’Or" (2023)
25. "Si les dieux t'abandonnent..." (2025)

=== In English ===
The series have been translated into English and published by Cinebook in a censored form. The following issues have been released:

1. "The Heir" (includes "The W Group")
2. "Takeover Bid" (includes "Business Blues")
3. "Dutch Connection" (includes "H")
4. "The Hour of the Tiger" (includes "Fort Makiling")
5. "See Venice..."
6. "...And Die"
7. "Golden Gate"
8. "Shadow"
9. "The Price of Money"
10. "The Law of the Dollar"
11. "The Three Eyes of the Tao Guardians"
12. "The Way and the Virtue"
13. "Cold Black Sea"
14. "Red Hot Wrath"
15. "Crossing Paths"
16. "20 Seconds"
17. "Morning Star"
18. "Scarlet Sail"
19. "The Edge of Night"
20. "The Golden Percentile"

=== Spinoff: La Fortune des Winczlav ===
1. "Vanko 1848" (2021)
2. "Tom and Liza 1910" (2022)
3. "Danitza 1965" (2023)

== In other media ==
=== TV ===
An English-language TV series loosely based on the comics was launched in 2001 and lasted two seasons, starring Paolo Seganti as Largo Winch and Diego Walraff as Simon Ovronnaz. It aired in France on M6 and in Canada on Showcase Television as Largo. The complete series is available on DVD in France, with the episodes however only in dubbed French.

=== Video games ===
Largo Winch: Empire Under Threat
- Developer: Dupuis
- Publisher: Ubi Soft
- Series: Largo Winch
- Platforms: Xbox, PlayStation 2, GameCube, Windows
- Release: PS2, Windows: PAL: September 6, 2002; Xbox: PAL: September 19, 2002; GameCube: PAL: October 1, 2002
- Genre: Action-adventure
- Mode: Single-player

Largo Winch: Empire Under Threat is an action-adventure game released in 2002 by Dupuis only in Europe. It is a puzzle-based third-person game with Largo himself as the playable character. The plot of the game follows the usual scenario of Largo Winch stories, with his business empire under threat as he fights to save it, in locations such as New York; Veracruz, Mexico; Russia; Siberia; Sardinia; and Nerio's Island Sarjevane in the Adriatic Sea. It received mixed reviews from critics.

Largo Winch .// Commando SAR is an action-adventure game released in 2002 by Rebellion Developments for PlayStation 1. It's a third-person stealth game. The plot follows Largo Winch as he dismantles a cabal of commandos conspiring against Winch's financial empire. Unlike Empire Under Threat, this game got a US release.

=== Film ===
A first film, written and directed by Jérôme Salle and starring Tomer Sisley as Largo Winch, was released in France on December 17, 2008, loosely adapting the first two issues with elements of the next two.

A sequel, also by Salle, was released in 2011. Not adapting a particular storyline, it drew inspiration from the events of the fifth and six issues to create a new story. A third film is in the works, based on issues 13 and 14, without the involvement of Salle and Sisley but with a screenplay by series creator Jean Van Hamme himself, who had been critical of the past films, and of Salle in particular.

Largo, a documentary film directed by Yves Legrain-Crist with Jean Van Hamme and Philippe Francq, was released in France in Autumn 2007. This film shows two authors are searching for the answer to the question, "How is a comic book created?" It has been available directly from the producers through video-on-demand, with English subtitles.

A third instalment, The Price of Money: A Largo Winch Adventure (2024), also known as Largo Winch 3, was directed by Olivier Masset-Depasse and written by Giordano Gederlini and Domenico La Porta. It was released by O'Brother Distribution and Pan Distribution on July 31, 2024, in France; August 7, 2024, in Belgium; and August 28, 2024, in Russia and Kuwait. The film had a budget of $17 million but only grossed $3.6 million worldwide.

There have been two Indian film adaptations: Agnyaathavaasi (2018) and Saaho (2019).
