= Une famille à louer =

- Film poster
- Directed by: Jean-Pierre Améris
- Written by: Jean-Pierre Améris; Murielle Magellan
- Produced by: Nathalie Gastaldo; Philippe Godeau
- Starring: Benoît Poelvoorde; Virginie Efira
- Cinematography: Virginie Saint-Martin
- Edited by: Anne Souriau
- Music by: Valérie Lindon
- Production companies: Pan Européenne Production; StudioCanal; France 3 Cinéma; O'Brother
- Distributed by: StudioCanal (France)
- Release dates: 11 June 2015 (Cabourg); 19 August 2015 (France & Belgium)
- Running time: 97 minutes
- Countries: France; Belgium
- Language: French
- Budget: $8 million
- Box office: $6.2 million

Une famille à louer is a 2015 comedy film directed by Jean-Pierre Améris and starring Benoît Poelvoorde and Virginie Efira.

== Cast ==
- Benoît Poelvoorde as Paul-André Delalande
- Virginie Efira as Violette Mandini
- François Morel as Léon
- Philippe Rebbot as Rémi
- Pauline Serieys as Lucie Mandini
- Calixte Broisin-Doutaz as Auguste Mandini
- Édith Scob as Madame Delalande
- Nancy Tate as Sandra
- Rémy Roubakha as Lucien
- Xavier Mathieu as Fabian
- Gwendoline Hamon as Fabian's wife
