= Les Sœurs fâchées =

2004 French comedy film by Alexandra Leclère

- Directed by: Alexandra Leclère
- Written by: Alexandra Leclère
- Produced by: Philippe Godeau
- Starring: Isabelle Huppert; Catherine Frot
- Cinematography: Michel Amathieu
- Edited by: Hervé de Luze; Jacqueline Mariani
- Music by: Philippe Sarde
- Production company: Pan-Européenne
- Distributed by: Pan-Européenne Distribution
- Release date: 22 December 2004
- Running time: 93 minutes
- Country: France
- Language: French

Les Sœurs Fâchées (literal translation: 'The Angry Sisters'), distributed in English as Me And My Sister, is a 2004 French comedy film written and directed by Alexandra Leclère. Starred by Isabelle Huppert and Catherine Frot.

== Cast ==
- Isabelle Huppert as Martine Demouthy
- Catherine Frot as Louise Mollet
- François Berléand as Pierre Demouthy
- Brigitte Catillon as Sophie
- Michel Vuillermoz as Richard
- Christiane Millet as Géraldine
- Rose Thiéry as Fernanda, la bonne
- Bruno Chiche as Charles
- Antoine Beaufils as Alexandre Demouthy
- Jean-Philippe Puymartin as The editor
- Aurore Auteuil as The hostess
