= Tomer Sisley =

Israeli-French actor and comedian

- תומר סיסלי
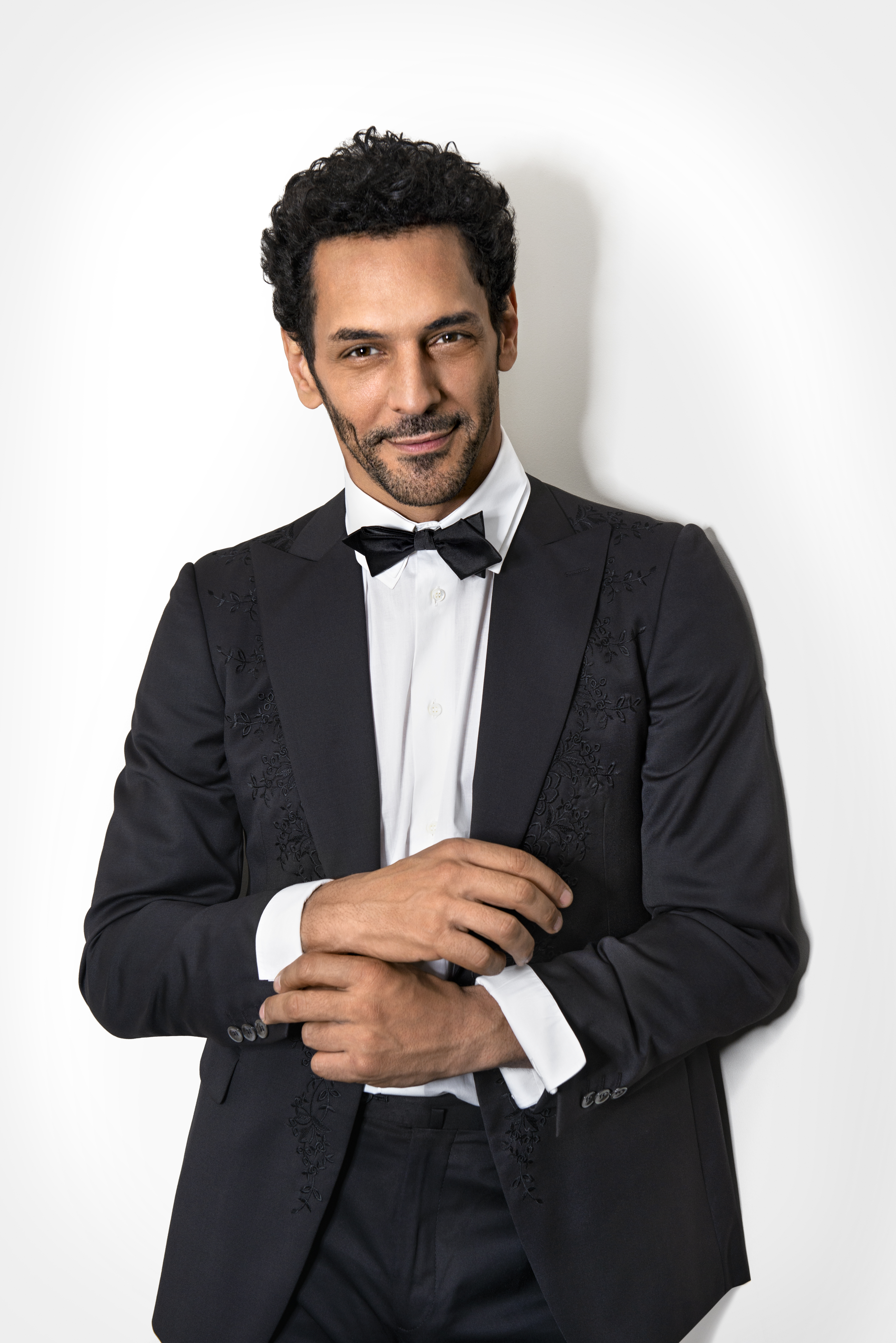
- Tomer Sisley at the 2019 Cannes Film Festival
- Born: Tomer Gazit; 14 August 1974 (age 52); West Berlin, West Germany
- Citizenship: Israel; France
- Occupations: Actor, comedian
- Years active: 1996–present
- Children: 3

Tomer Sisley (born Tomer Gazit; Hebrew: תומר סיסלי; born 14 August 1974) is an Israeli and French actor and comedian.

== Early and personal life ==
Tomer was born in West Berlin, West Germany, to Israeli-born parents who had relocated because of his father's job as a research scientist in dermatology. His mother is also a dermatologist. His parents met as schoolmates in Ramat Gan, Israel, and were childhood sweethearts. His father's family has roots in Lithuania and today's Belarus, while his mother is of Yemenite descent.

His parents separated when he was five years old. At age nine, he left Berlin to live with his father Joseph Sisley in southern France, where his father was offered a position. He is fluent in German, Hebrew, French, and English. He attended an English-speaking school, and then attended the bi-lingual Centre international de Valbonne in Sophia Antipolis near Nice, France.

Sisley resides in Paris with his family. He is an avid horse rider, as well as practitioner of Krav Maga, jiujitsu and boxing. He is a licensed helicopter pilot, and has described himself as "skydiving, paragliding, and extreme skiing fan".

== Career ==
=== Comedy ===
Sisley performed stand-up comedy for six years. In 2003 he was the first French stand-up comedian to win the Just for Laughs comedy festival in Montreal, Canada, the largest comedy festival in the world.

==== Plagiarism scandal ====
In 2019, it was brought to light that Tomer was using material taken from American comedians. He admitted "having copied between '20-30 per cent' of his gags."

=== Film ===
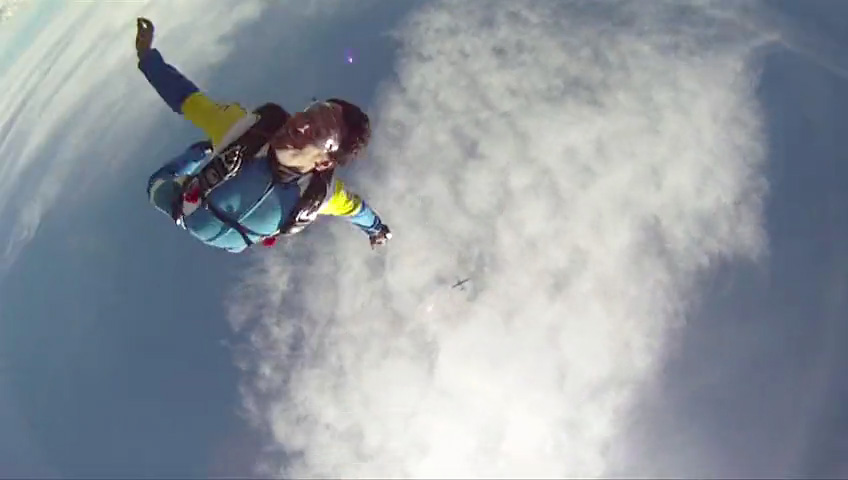
Tomer Sisley skydiving for the filming of Largo Winch II.

Among his first films were the Tunisian fictional film Bedwin Hacker (2003), the comedy drama Virgil (2005), the French romantic comedy-drama Toi et moi (2006), the French crime film Paris Lockdown (2007), and the French action thriller Largo Winch (2008). In 2009, Sisley won the Most Promising Newcomer title at the Étoiles d'or French awards for his acting in Largo Winch.

In 2011, Sisley accepted the leading part in a low-budget French thriller film Sleepless Night. The movie was bought by Tribeca Productions, Robert De Niro's distribution company, and Warner Brothers bought the rights for a remake. The film showed at the Tribeca Film Festival, Toronto International Film Festival, and Rome Film Festival.

In the French action thriller Largo Winch II (2011), Sisley performed a fight while skydiving from a plane without a parachute. He does all of his own stunts. Among his next films were the American comedy We're the Millers (2013), the French costume drama and adventure film Angélique (2013), and the Israeli-French docudrama political thriller Rabin, the Last Day (2015).

In the American thriller web television series Messiah (2020) Sisley plays Israeli Shin Bet intelligence officer Aviram Dahan.

== Filmography ==
- 1996 : Highlander: The Series (TV) as Reza
- 1996 : Studio Sud (TV) as Nico
- 1999 : Highlander: The Raven (TV) as Felix
- 2003 : Dédales by René Manzor as Malik
- 2003 : Bedwin Hacker by Nadia el Fani as Chams, a Tunisian-French journalist
- 2005 : Virgil by Mabrouk el Mechri as Dino Taliori
- 2006 : Toi et moi by Julie Lopes-Curval as Farid
- 2006 : The Nativity Story by Catherine Hardwicke as Tax Collector
- 2007 : Paris Lockdown by Frédéric Schoendoerffer as Larbi, a Moroccan gangster
- 2008 : Largo Winch by Jérôme Salle as Largo Winch
- 2011 : Largo Winch II by Jérôme Salle as Largo Winch
- 2011 : Sleepless Night by Frédéric Jardin as Vincent, a police detective
- 2013 : We're the Millers by Rawson Marshall Thurber as Pablo Chacón, a Mexican drug lord
- 2013 : Kidon by Emmanuel Naccache as Daniel
- 2013 : Angélique by Ariel Zeitoun as Marquis de Plessis-Bellière, a French aristocrat
- 2015 : Rabin, the Last Day by Amos Gitai as Rabin's driver
- 2018-2019 : Philharmonia (TV) as Rafaël Crozes
- 2018-2023 : Balthazar (TV) as Raphaël Balthazar, a forensic pathologist
- 2019 : Lucky Day by Roger Avary as Jean-Jacques
- 2020 : Messiah (TV) by James McTeigue and Kate Woods as Aviram Dahan, an Israeli Shin Bet officer
- 2021: Don't Look Up by Adam McKay as Adul Grelio
- 2023: Vortex (TV) as Ludovic Béguin
- 2023: BDE by Michaël Youn as Dany Frydman
- 2023: Comme mon fils by Franck Brett as Victor
- 2024: The Price of Money: A Largo Winch Adventure by Olivier Masset-Depasse as Largo Winch
- 2024: Notre histoire de France (TV documentary) as the narrator
- 2026: G.I.G.N. as David, commander of the G.I.G.N.

== Awards ==
=== Wins ===
- 2009: Étoiles d'Or Awards for Best Male Newcomer for his role in Largo Winch
- 2009: Rémy Julienne Award of Valenciennes International Festival of Action and Adventure Films
