= Vitali Kanevsky =

Soviet film director

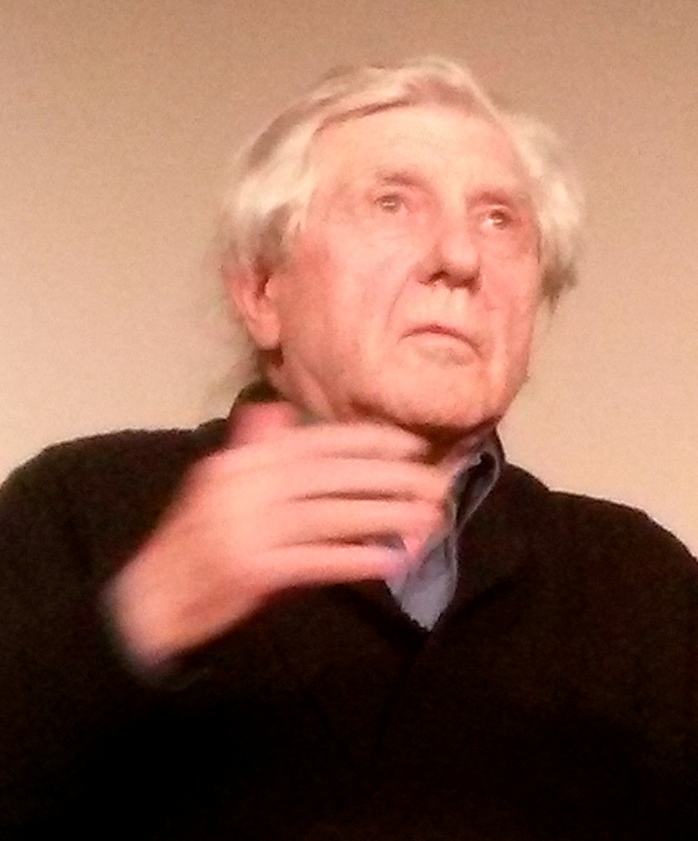
- Born: 4 September 1935 (age 90); Suchan, Soviet Union
- Occupations: Film director Screenwriter
- Years active: 1976–2000

Vitali Yevgenievich Kanevsky (Russian: Вита́лий Евге́ньевич Кане́вский; born 4 September 1935) is a Soviet film director and screenwriter. His film Freeze Die Come to Life won the Caméra d'Or at the 1990 Cannes Film Festival. Two years later, his film An Independent Life would win the Jury Prize at the 1992 Cannes Film Festival. The film was also nominated for the Golden Bear at the 42nd Berlin International Film Festival.

In 1960 he entered the directing department of VGIK (Mikhail Romm's workshop).

Kanevsky served a prison sentence for rape from 1966 to 1974.

Vitali currently lives in France, USA, and St. Petersburg.

== Filmography ==
- Po sekretu vsemu svetu (1976)
- Village History (1981)
- Freeze Die Come to Life (1989)
- An Independent Life (1992)
- Nous, les enfants du xxème siècle (1994)
- KTO Bolche (2000)
