= Largo Winch (TV series) =

- DVD cover of the second season
- Created by: Largo Winch by: Philippe Francq; Jean Van Hamme
- Developed by: Phil Bedard; Larry Lalonde
- Written by: Phil Bedard; Larry Lalonde; Roy Sallows; Larry Mollin; Karen Harris; William Gray; Gail Morgan Hickman
- Directed by: Joseph L. Scanlan; David Wu; Paolo Barzman
- Starring: Paolo Seganti; Sydney Penny; Diego Wallraff; Serge Houde; Geordie Johnson
- Composer: Michel Colombier
- Countries of origin: France; Canada; Germany; Belgium; United States
- No. of episodes: 39

Production
- Executive producers: Phil Bedard; David J. Patterson; Gail Morgan Hickman
- Producers: Phil Bedard; Larry Mollin
- Production locations: Montreal, Quebec, Canada; Paris, France
- Running time: c. 42 minutes
- Production companies: Dupuis Audiovisuel; TVA International; AT-Production; Paramount International Television; Tandem Communications; Betafilm

Original release
- Release: January 26, 2001 – November 24, 2002

Largo Winch is a television program based on the Belgian comic book series of the same name by Philippe Francq and Jean Van Hamme that first aired on January 26, 2001 in France on M6, and May 3, 2001 in Germany on ProSieben. The show lasted two seasons. Guest stars included Kim Poirier, Vernon Dobtcheff, Elisha Cuthbert, Olga Kurylenko and David Carradine.

== Plot ==
Largo Winch (Paolo Seganti) is a 28-year-old adventurer, drifting around the world, searching for himself. His best friend is Simon Ovrannaz (Diego Wallraff), an ex-thief he met in a Turkish prison.

Largo's life is changed forever when he learns that Nerio Winch (David Carradine), the stepfather he barely knew, is dead. Nerio is an Aristotle Onassis-like billionaire who secretly adopted Largo as a child, but never took him in. Instead, he paid a family in Luxembourg to raise him, then sent him to a monastery as a teenager to be educated. Nerio paid the bills, and that was the extent of their relationship. Those last few years, they barely saw each other.

Nerio committed suicide because he was dying of a brain tumor. He has left his vast fortune and control of his multi-national corporate empire Group W to Largo. Largo is overwhelmed by the responsibility of this sudden inheritance. The board of directors at Group W despise him, thinking him unworthy and incompetent.

Largo subsequently receives an astonishing video recorded by his stepfather just before his death. On it, Nerio reveals that he was once a member of a mysterious organization The Adriatic Commission, a secret conspiracy of billionaires and politicians who work to control the economic and political destiny of the world for their own ends. For years they have tried to kill Nerio for leaving. Nerio says that if he is dead, despite what the official cause of death may be, it is because they have finally succeeded. Nerio ends the video by charging Largo with using Group W to seek out and destroy The Commission and uncover the names of its secret members.

Eventually Largo discovers another shocking piece of information. Nerio was not his stepfather at all, but his biological parent. He kept Largo's existence a secret to protect him from The Commission, which would have used the son against the father.

And so Largo faces increasing challenges. He must learn to run one of the world's biggest corporations, while being opposed and undermined at every turn by his own board of directors. They are led by Michel Cardignac (Charles Powell), an executive who will do whatever he can to see Largo ousted and himself at the head of Group W.

Largo must also follow his father's wishes and try to expose and destroy The Adriatic Commission. And since The Commission is determined to gain control of Group W, they are always shadowing him, always waiting for an opportunity to pounce and destroy him.

But Largo is an adventurer at heart, not a businessman. And so, at every opportunity, he bolts the boardroom and sets off in search of excitement. But he does not go alone. He is assisted by Joy Arden (Sydney Penny), an ex-CIA agent who formerly work for Group W's security under Nerio, and Georgi Kerensky (Geordie Johnson), a former KGB agent who left Russia after the fall of the Soviet Union.

His biggest ally inside Group W is John Sullivan (Serge Houde), head of the Group W legal department and a member of the board of directors. He was Nerio's best friend, and swore to do all he could to help Largo navigate the treacherous waters of Nerio's empire.

== Cast ==
- Paolo Seganti as Largo Winch
- Sydney Penny as Joy Arden
- Diego Wallraff as Simon Ovronnaz
- Serge Houde as John Sullivan
- Geordie Johnson as Georgy Kerensky
- Tyrone Benskin as Waldo Buzetti
- Sonia Benezra as Alicia Del Ferill
- Charles Powell as Michel Cardignac
- Victoria Sanchez as Vanessa Ovronnaz
- Michelle Lipper as Marissa Green
- Agathe De La Boulaye as Diana Murray
- Lucie Jeanne as Danielle Haddad

=== Guest ===
- Babsie Steger as Anna Faubert (Season 1, Episode 14)
- David Carradine as Nerio Winch [Season 1(part one) (Pilot)]

== Episodes ==
=== Season 1 ===
1. The Heir (part one) (Pilot)
2. The Heir (part two) (Pilot)
3. Legacy
4. Just Cause
5. Sins of the Father
6. Revenge
7. Arctic Project
8. AKA: Vanessa
9. Blind Eye
10. Queen of Hearts
11. Sylvia
12. Nuclear Family
13. Contessa Vanessa
14. Briefcase
15. Endgame
16. Redemption
17. Cheap Thrills
18. Blast from the Past
19. Dear Abby
20. Forget Me Not
21. Flashback
22. Court of Last Resort
23. The Hunted
24. Business as Usual
25. See You in Court
26. Revelations

=== Season 2 ===
1. Bloodlines
2. A Breed Apart
3. Love Hurts
4. Cold Hearted
5. Skin Deep
6. Psycho Killer
7. Scent of Suspicion
8. Killer Cardignac
9. Hot Property
10. Rest and Relaxation
11. Down on the Pharm
12. Errors of Commission
13. Time in a Bottle
