= Game of Four =

- Theatrical release poster
- Directed by: Bruno Dega
- Written by: Bruno Dega; Jeanne Le Guillou
- Produced by: Nathalie Gastaldo
- Starring: Mathilde Seigner; Roschdy Zem; François Cluzet; Alice Taglioni
- Cinematography: Aleksander Kaufmann
- Edited by: Valérie Deseine
- Music by: Jean-Michel Bernard
- Production company: Pan-Européenne
- Distributed by: Wild Bunch
- Release date: 24 October 2007
- Running time: 88 minutes
- Country: France
- Language: French
- Budget: $7.6 million
- Box office: $3.2 million

Game of Four (Détrompez-vous) is a 2007 French comedy film directed by Bruno Dega and co-written with Jeanne Le Guillou. The film stars Mathilde Seigner, Roschdy Zem, François Cluzet, and Alice Taglioni.

== Plot ==
Lisa and Thomas are lovers. They give appointments in hotels and have so far managed to avoid arousing the suspicions of their respective spouses, Lionel and Carole. One day, Carole goes to a new gynecologist (hers is on maternity leave!) And falls on Lionel, she had met shortly before leaving school, their children being in the same class. A detail then puts their chip ear, they even decorated the pen came from Seville, which had been offered by the husband and wife.

They eventually realize that Lisa and Thomas were in the same place at the same time. Lionel and Carole each follow their spouse and discover their connection. They will then work independently of each other to separate the two lovers ...

== Cast ==
- Mathilde Seigner as Lisa
- Roschdy Zem as Thomas
- François Cluzet as Lionel
- Alice Taglioni as Carole
- Florence Foresti as Brigitte
- Artus de Penguern as François
- Philippe Lefebvre as Damien
- Talina Boyaci as Zoé
- Titouan Laporte as Eliot
- Laurent Olmedo as Manuel
- Sylvie Fourrier as Muriel
- Macha Béranger as Madame Olga
- Elisabeth Macocco as Madame Lambert-Charpentier
