= Hervé de Luze =

French film editor

- Born: 1949 (age 76–77)
- Occupation: Film editor
- Years active: 1971–present

Hervé de Luze (born 1949) is a French film editor with about fifty feature film credits.

de Luze had a long collaboration with the director Claude Berri, for whom he edited eight films between 1981 and 1999. de Luze has been director Roman Polanski's principal editor since Pirates (1986), including the much honored 2002 film The Pianist. de Luze has also edited several films with Alain Resnais, including On connaît la chanson, for which he won a César Award.

de Luze was nominated for the Academy Award for Best Film Editing for The Pianist. de Luze has also won three César Awards (the "French Academy Award") for On connaît la chanson (1997), for Ne le dis à personne (2006), and for The Ghost Writer (2010); he has been nominated for the César for five other films as well.

== Filmography ==
The listing is based on the Internet Movie Database; the directors for several films are given in parentheses.

- 1973 : La Décharge
- 1977 : Pourquoi?
- 1981 : La Forêt désenchantée
- 1981 : Le Maître d'école (Claude Berri)
- 1982 : Deux heures moins le quart avant Jésus-Christ
- 1983 : Tchao Pantin (Claude Berri)
- 1986 : Pirates (Roman Polanski)
- 1986 : Jean de Florette (Claude Berri)
- 1986 : Manon des sources (Claude Berri)
- 1987 : Jeux d'artifices
- 1988 : To Kill a Priest (Agnieszka Holland)
- 1990 : Uranus (Claude Berri)
- 1991 : Langlois monumental (TV)
- 1992 : City of Joy (Roland Joffé)
- 1992 : Bitter Moon (Roman Polanski)
- 1993 : Germinal (Claude Berri)
- 1994 : Death and the Maiden (Roman Polanski)
- 1995 : Le Garçu (Maurice Pialat)
- 1997 : Lucie Aubrac (Claude Berri)
- 1997 : Autre chose à foutre qu'aimer
- 1997 : On connaît la chanson (Alain Resnais)
- 1998 : Zonzon
- 1998 : Baby Blues (short -Stéphane Lévy)
- 1999 : Astérix et Obélix contre César (Claude Zidi)
- 1999 : The Ninth Gate (Roman Polanski)
- 1999 : La Débandade (Claude Berri)
- 2000 : The Taste of Others (Agnès Jaoui)
- 2000 : Esther Kahn (Arnaud Desplechin)
- 2001 : Liberté-Oléron
- 2002 : The Pianist (Roman Polanski)
- 2002 : 24 Hours in the Life of a Woman
- 2003 : Corps à corps (François Hanss)
- 2003 : The Mystery of the Yellow Room (Bruno Podalydès)
- 2003 : Pas sur la bouche (Alain Resnais)
- 2004 : Bienvenue en Suisse (Léa Fazer)
- 2004 : Les Sœurs fâchées (Alexandra Leclère)
- 2005 : Oliver Twist (Roman Polanski)
- 2006 : Private Fears in Public Places (Alain Resnais)
- 2007 : Tell No One (Guillaume Canet)
- 2007 : L'invité (Laurent Bouhnik)
- 2007 : Whatever Lola Wants (Nabil Ayouch)
- 2008 : Staten Island (James DeMonaco)
- 2009 : Les Herbes folles (Alain Resnais)
- 2010 : The Ghost Writer (Roman Polanski)
- 2011 : Carnage (Roman Polanski)
- 2012 : You Haven't Seen Anything Yet (Alain Resnais)
- 2013 : Venus in Fur (Roman Polanski)
- 2014 : Le Père Noël (Alexandre Coffre)
- 2015 : Le tout nouveau Testament (Jaco Van Dormael)
- 2016 : Down by Love (Pierre Godeau)
- 2016 : Open at Night (Édouard Baer)
- 2017 : Rock'n Roll (Guillaume Canet)
- 2023 : The Palace (Roman Polanski)

== See also ==
- List of film director and editor collaborations. de Luze's collaboration with Roman Polanski extends from 1986 to the present.
