= Alexandra Leclère =

French film director

Alexandra Leclère is a French film director. She is also a screenwriter and dialogue writer. Her short film, Bouche à bouche, won two jury prizes, at the Cinéma au Parfum de Grasse Festival in 2003 and at the International Festival of Short Films in Belo Horizonte, Brazil.

== Filmography (director and screenwriter) ==
- 2002 : Bouche à bouche (short)
- 2004 : Les Sœurs fâchées
- 2007 : Le Prix à payer (English title: The Price to Pay)
- 2012 : Maman
- 2015 : Le grand partage (English title: The Roommates Party)
- 2017 : Garde alternée
