= Freeze Die Come to Life =

1989 film

- Film poster
- Directed by: Vitali Kanevsky
- Written by: Vitali Kanevsky
- Starring: Dinara Drukarova; Pavel Nazarov
- Cinematography: Vladimir Brylyakov
- Edited by: Galina Kornilova
- Music by: Sergey Banevich
- Distributed by: Lenfilm
- Release date: 1989
- Running time: 105 minutes
- Country: Soviet Union
- Language: Russian

Freeze Die Come to Life (Russian: Замри, умри, воскресни!, romanized: Zamri, umri, voskresni!, lit. 'Freeze, die, resurrect!') is a 1989 Soviet drama film directed by Vitali Kanevsky. It was screened in the Un Certain Regard section at the 1990 Cannes Film Festival, where it won the Caméra d'Or.

== Plot ==
Set in 1947 in the desolate mining town of Suchan, the story follows teenagers Valerka and Galiya, who share a love-hate friendship as they navigate the harsh realities of their lives. Valerka, spotting Galiya selling hot water labeled as "tea" in the freezing town market, mimics her and claims his water is fresher. With his earnings, he buys skates, only to have them stolen, but Galiya helps him retrieve them. Valerka also gets into trouble at school for a prank involving yeast in the toilets, leading his mother to beg the principal not to expel him. After a local train operator beats him for riding coal cars, Valerka mischievously redirects a rail switch, causing the train to derail. Afraid of being caught, he confides in Galiya and flees to Vladivostok, where he briefly joins a gang, unwittingly assisting in a jewelry store robbery that turns violent. However, when the gang suspects him of being a snitch, they decide to kill him.

Galiya, visiting Vladivostok, finds Valerka and warns him that the authorities had been looking for him at his mother's request and that he’s no longer a suspect for the train accident. Together, they narrowly escape from the gang, fleeing partway by train and then on foot. As they journey back to Suchan, Valerka recites poetry and sings songs about love to Galiya. Tragically, in the film’s final moments, the gang catches up with them. The closing scene reveals Galiya’s lifeless body being brought home on a cart by her grieving father, while Valerka’s mother is said to be taking him to the hospital.

== Cast ==
- Dinara Drukarova as Galia
- Pavel Nazarov as Valerka
- Yelena Popova as Valerka's mother
- Valeri Ivchenko
- Vyacheslav Bambushek as Vitka
- Vadim Yermolayev as School principal

== Reception ==
In 1990, the film received the Grand Prix for Best Film at Film Fest Gent.
