= Kossi Efoui =

Togolese writer

Kossi Efoui (born 1962 in Anfoin) is a Togolese writer, playwright, and novelist.

Efoui was born in Anfoin, a village in the Maritime Region of Togo, studied philosophy at the University of Lomé, and obtained a master's degree in philosophy from the University of Benin. In the 1980s, he took part in a non-conformist student movement in opposition to President Gnassingbé Eyadéma, and moved to France in 1992 in a case of self-imposed exile. His first play, Le carrefour, was published in France and the United States in 1990 and 1991, respectively, after achieving success in Togo, and it was performed in the French Cultural Centre in Lomé the same year.

After publishing several short stories throughout the mid-1990s, Efoui published his first novel, La Polka, in 1997, and followed that up with La Fabrique de cérémonies in 2001, which won the Grand prix littéraire d'Afrique noire. His third novel, Solo d'un revenant, was published in 2008, and won the Prix des cinq continents de la francophonie, and he followed that up with L'Ombre des choses à venir, published in 2009. Efoui's plays were noted as having unclear settings, which were the subject of criticism as his works were considered too Western and too isolated from Africa, which Efoui did intentionally to link Africa and the West in his works. Specifically, in Le carrefour, he described his characters as bodies, rather than specifically noting them as black or African. In 2010, the University of Paris III: Sorbonne Nouvelle organized a collection of Efoui's plays, titled "Le théâtre de Kossi Efoui : une poétique du marronnage au pouvoir".

== Bibliography ==
- L'Ombre des choses à venir, novel, ed. Le Seuil, 2009
- Solo d'un revenant, novel, ed. Le Seuil, 2008
- Io (tragedy), theatre, ed. Le bruit des autres, 2007
- Volatiles, news, ed. Joca Seria, 2006
- La Fabrique de cérémonies, novel, ed. Le Seuil, 2001 ISBN 2-02-047299-6
- L'entre-deux rêves de Pitagaba, theatre, ed. Acoria, 2000
- La Polka, novela, ed. Le Seuil, 1997
- Le Petit Frère du rameur, theatre, ed. Lansman, 1995
- Les coupons de Magali, 1994 ISBN 0-290-78844-7
- La Malaventure, theatre, ed. Lansman, 1993
- Le carrefour, theatre, ed. L'Harmattan, 1989
