= Nadia El Fani =

French-Tunisian film director (born 1960)

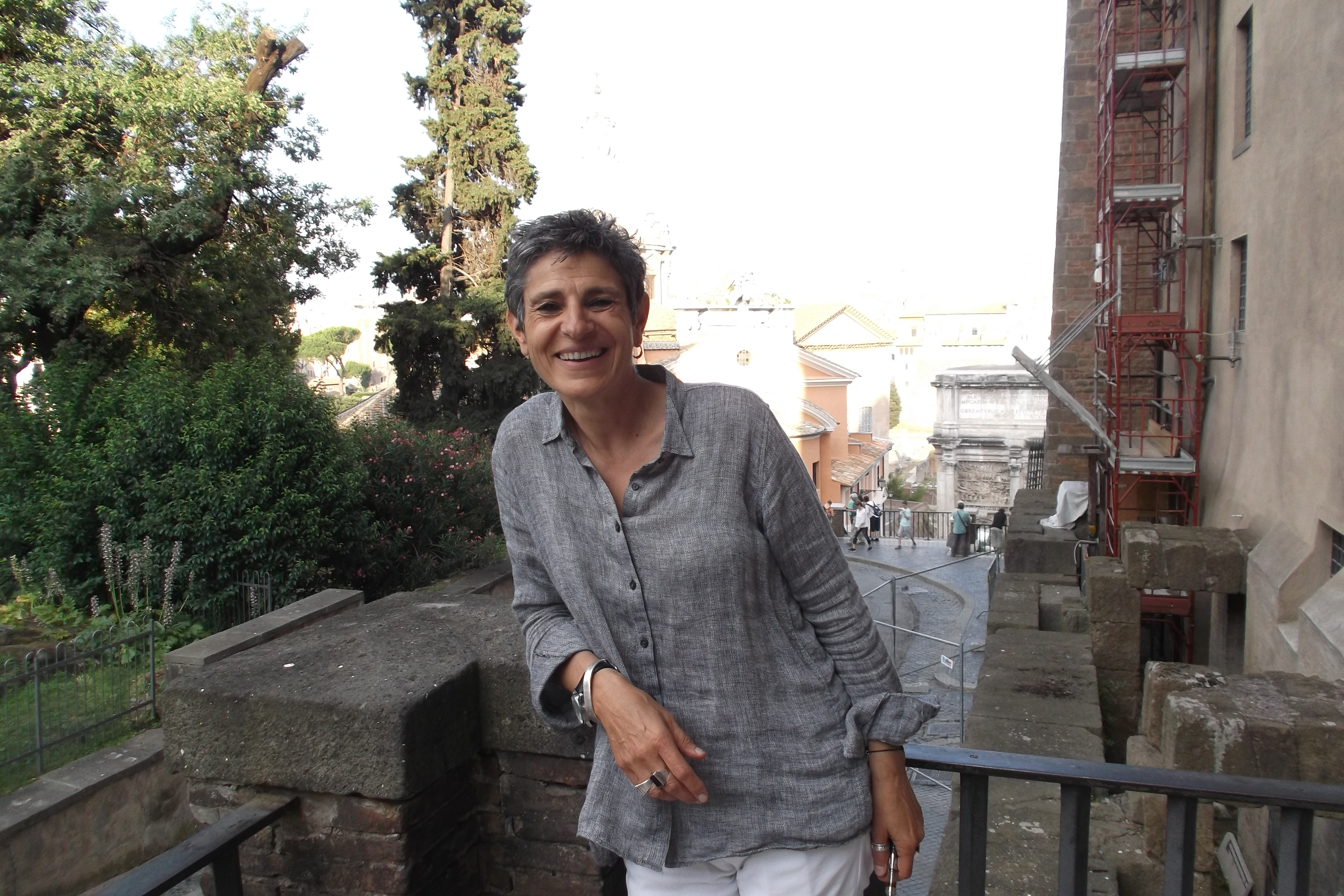
- Fani in 2015 in Rome.
- Born: 1960 (age 65–66); Paris, France
- Occupations: Film director; screenwriter; speaker; political activist
- Years active: 1982–present
- Movement: Secular movement

Nadia El Fani (Arabic: نادية الفاني; born 1960 in Paris), is a French-Tunisian film director, screenwriter and producer. She has primarily directed documentary films about human rights, women's rights, secularism, and criticism of religion.

== Biography ==
=== Career until 2011 ===
Nadia El Fani was born to a French mother and a Tunisian father. Her father Béchir El Fani was one of the leaders of the Tunisian Communist Party after independence. He appeared in her film Ouled Lenine. She is the sister of cinematographer Sofian El Fani.

She began working in cinema as an intern in 1982 in the film Misunderstood by Jerry Schatzberg, shot in Tunisia. Next, she became assistant director and worked with, amongst others, Roman Polanski, Nouri Bouzid, Romain Goupil and Franco Zeffirelli. In 1990, she directed her first short film and created her first video production company in Tunisia, Z’Yeux Noirs Movies, to produce and direct her films in this country. Being close to Tunisian militant feminist groups, she began making documentaries in 1993 with Femmes Leader du Maghreb and Tanitez-moi.

El Fani relocated to Paris in 2002, during the postproduction of her first long fiction film, the comedy Bedwin Hacker. She wanted to escape the regime of Ben Ali, Tunisian society which she felt was becoming more conservative due to the pressure of Islamists, and the threats she received for two controversial scenes in Bedwin Hacker. Thereafter she directed several documentaries, including Ouled Lenine in 2008. In the autumn of 2009, El Fani was diagnosed with breast cancer, and began chemotherapy treatment, causing hair loss.

=== Neither Allah nor Master controversy ===
El Fani discusses the Neither Allah nor Master controversy at the Secular Conference 2014 in London.

The 2011 documentary Neither Allah nor Master (Ni Allah ni Maître, a play on the Ni Dieu ni maître slogan coined by French socialist Louis Auguste Blanqui in 1880), in France released under the title Laïcité, Inch'Allah ! ("Secularism, God willing!"), describes the events leading up to the Tunisian Revolution and those directly following it, focusing on the role of Islam in the public sphere. In the film, El Fani states that the fall of Ben Ali should not only bring about political freedom, but also religious freedom. She defends laïcité (secularism) and warns against the threat of Islamism.

In late April 2011, El Fani was invited by Hannibal TV to discuss her new film on television in a studio with 500 people. She reported that the message of her film was well-understood, and there was no hostility from the audience in the room. Although she confirmed she was an atheist herself, she claimed that Neither Allah nor Master was "not anti-religious", but a defence of separation of religion and state. At the time of the interview, she was bald because she was still undergoing chemotherapy.

An edited shorter version of the interview went viral online shortly after, causing an Islamist backlash.

El Fani received numerous death threats for being an atheist and bald and was the target of massive defamation on social media. One person on social media promised 200 million dinars to whoever would kill her. She decided to flee Tunisia and once again return to France to escape persecution and imprisonment.

During the film's premiere in April 2011 in Tunis, dozens of Islamists attacked the cinema, breaking down the door shouting Allahu akbar! with black flags and effectively preventing the screening. Islamist lawyers filed complaints against her film.

Her film premiered in France on 21 September 2011 with the title Laïcité, Inch'Allah !, and she received the Prix Internationale de la laïcité for it. Her film was later the subject of a doctoral thesis in England on Secularism in Middle Eastern Documentaries. El Fani was also recovering from her cancer, joking that "The Revolution was the best of the remedies". Although she hoped to return to Tunisia "to live there and finally be free", she was afraid to go and that her passport would be confiscated.

=== Career after 2011 ===
El Fani directed Même pas mal in 2012. In it, she compares her struggle with breast cancer to the political battle against Islamic fundamentalism.

After Tunisian FEMEN activist Amina Tyler was arrested for posting a nude photo of herself online in 2013, El Fani was one of many who supported her. She shared an image of herself on Facebook with a statement on her chest: “My body belongs to me and is not the source of anyone’s honour.” In 2013, she co-directed Nos seins, nos armes !, a documentary about the FEMEN movement for France 2.

On 2 June 2017, the six complaints lodged against her in 2011 following the broadcast of her film Neither Allah nor Master were dismissed. In November 2017, she returned to Tunisia to present her film Même pas mal. It was the first time in six years she had been to Tunisia and seen her father, during which the state had banned all her films.

== Filmography ==
Nadia El Fani speaks about her work and the audiences' reactions at the Secular Conference 2017.

- 1990: Pour le plaisir ("For the Pleasure", short fiction film) – director
- 1992: Fifty-fifty mon amour ("Fifty-fifty My Love", short fiction film) – director
- 1993: Femmes Leader du Maghreb ("Women Leader of the Maghreb", long documentary film) – director
- 1993: Tanitez-moi (long documentary film) – director
- 1995: Mon cœur est témoin ("My Heart is My Witness", Québécois-Tunisian long documentary film by Louise Carré) – producer
- 1998: Tant qu'il y aura de la pelloche ("As Long As There Is Film", short documentary film) – director
- 2003: Bedwin Hacker ("Bedouin Hacker", long fiction film) – director, screenwriter and producer
- 2005: Unissez-vous, il n'est jamais trop tard ! ("Unite, It's Never Too Late!", for the short film series Paris la métisse ("The Mixed Paris")) – director
- 2007: Ouled Lenine ("Lenin's Children", long documentary film) – director
- 2011: Ni Allah ni Maître ("Neither Allah nor Master"), released in France under the title Laïcité, Inch'Allah ! ("Laïcité, Inshallah!", long documentary film) – director, producer
- 2012: Même pas mal ("It Doesn't Even Hurt", long documentary film) – co-director (with Alina Isabel Pérez) and screenwriter
- 2013: Nos seins, nos armes ! ("Our Breasts, Our Weapons!", long documentary film for France 2 about the FEMEN movement) – co-director (with Caroline Fourest)

== Recognition ==
In 2011, El Fani received the Prix de la laïcité ("Secularism Award") from the Comité Laïcité République in France. In 2013, she won the FESPACO award for Best Feature Documentary for Même Pas Mal.
