= Jean-Pierre Améris =

French film director

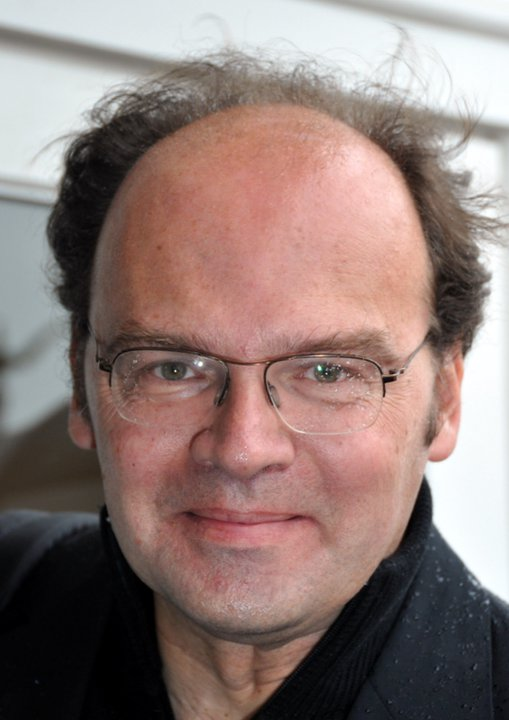
- Améris at the 2011 Cabourg Film Festival
- Born: 26 July 1961 (age 65); Lyon, France
- Occupations: Film director, screenwriter
- Years active: 1993—present

Jean-Pierre Améris (French pronunciation: [ʒɑ̃ pjɛʁ ameʁis]; born 26 July 1961) is a French film director and screenwriter. His film Lightweight was screened in the Un Certain Regard section at the 2004 Cannes Film Festival.

== Filmography ==
Year	Title	Credited as		Notes
Year	Title	Director	Screenwriter	Notes
1988	Interim	Yes	Yes	Short film Clermont-Ferrand International Short Film Festival - Grand Prix
1994	Le Bateau de mariage	Yes	Yes	
1994	Le Braqueur solitaire	Yes		TV series
1996	Les Aveux de l'innocent	Yes	Yes	1996 Cannes Film Festival - Mercedes-Benz Award; 1996 Cannes Film Festival - Award of the Youth for Best French Film
1997	Tous nos voeux de bonheur	Yes	Yes	Short film
1997	Madame Dubois - Hôtel Bellevue	Yes		Telefilm
1998	Combats de femme	Yes		TV series
1999	Bad Company	Yes		Santa Barbara International Film Festival - World Prism Award
2001	C'est la vie	Yes	Yes	San Sebastián International Film Festival - Silver Shell for Best Director; San Sebastián International Film Festival - Solidarity Award
2004	Lightweight	Yes	Yes	Nominated—2004 Cannes Film Festival - Prix Un certain regard
2006	Call Me Elisabeth	Yes	Yes	
2007	Maman est folle	Yes	Yes	Telefilm
2010	Romantics Anonymous	Yes	Yes	Magritte Award for Best Foreign Film in Coproduction
2012	The Man Who Laughs	Yes	Yes	
2012	La Joie de vivre	Yes	Yes	Telefilm
2014	Marie's Story	Yes	Yes	Locarno International Film Festival - Variety Piazza Grande Award; Mill Valley Film Festival - Audience Award for Favourite World Feature (2nd place); Wisconsin Film Festival - Audience Award for Best Narrative Feature
2015	Une famille à louer	Yes	Yes	
2018	I Feel Better	Yes	Yes	
2025	It Takes Two to Tango	Yes	Yes	
