= Jérôme Salle =

French film director and screenwriter

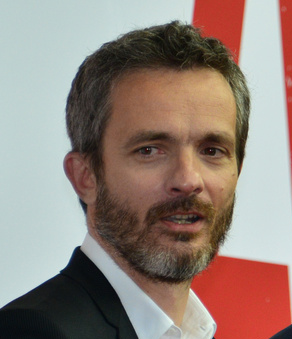
- Salle at the premiere of Zulu
- Born: 1971 (age 54–55); Paris, France
- Occupations: Film director, screenwriter
- Years active: 1997–present

Jérôme Salle (born 1971) is a French film director and screenwriter.

Salle is known for directing the films Anthony Zimmer, the Belgian comic book adaptation Largo Winch, and its sequel Largo Winch II. His 2013 film Zulu was selected as the closing film at the 2013 Cannes Film Festival. The film The Tourist (2010), written and directed by Florian Henckel von Donnersmarck, was based on Salle's screenplay for Anthony Zimmer and grossed US$278 million worldwide.

== Filmography ==
| Year | Title | Credited as | | Notes |
| Year | Title | Director | Screenwriter | Notes |
|---|---|---|---|---|
| 1997 | L'Homme idéal | | Yes | |
| 1998 | Bob le magnifique | | Yes | Telefilm |
| 2000 | Le Jour de Grâce | Yes | Yes | Short film |
| 2000 | Le Prince du Pacifique | | Yes | Uncredited |
| 2005 | Duplicity | | Yes | |
| 2005 | Anthony Zimmer | Yes | Yes | Nominated—César Award for Best First Feature Film |
| 2008 | Largo Winch | Yes | Yes | |
| 2011 | Largo Winch II | Yes | Yes | |
| 2013 | Zulu | Yes | Yes | |
| 2016 | The Odyssey | Yes | Yes | |
| 2022 | Kompromat | Yes | Yes | |
