= Philippe Francq =

Belgian comics artist for "Largo Winch"

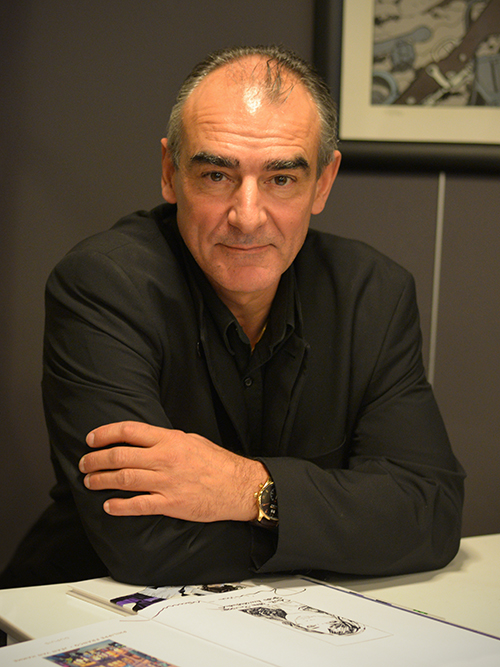
- Philippe Francq, 2014
- Born: 13 December 1961 (age 64) Etterbeek, Belgium
- Area: Artist
- Notable works: Largo Winch
- Awards: "Best Drawing" Haxtur Awards (1994) "Best Long Comic Strip" Haxtur Awards (1996)

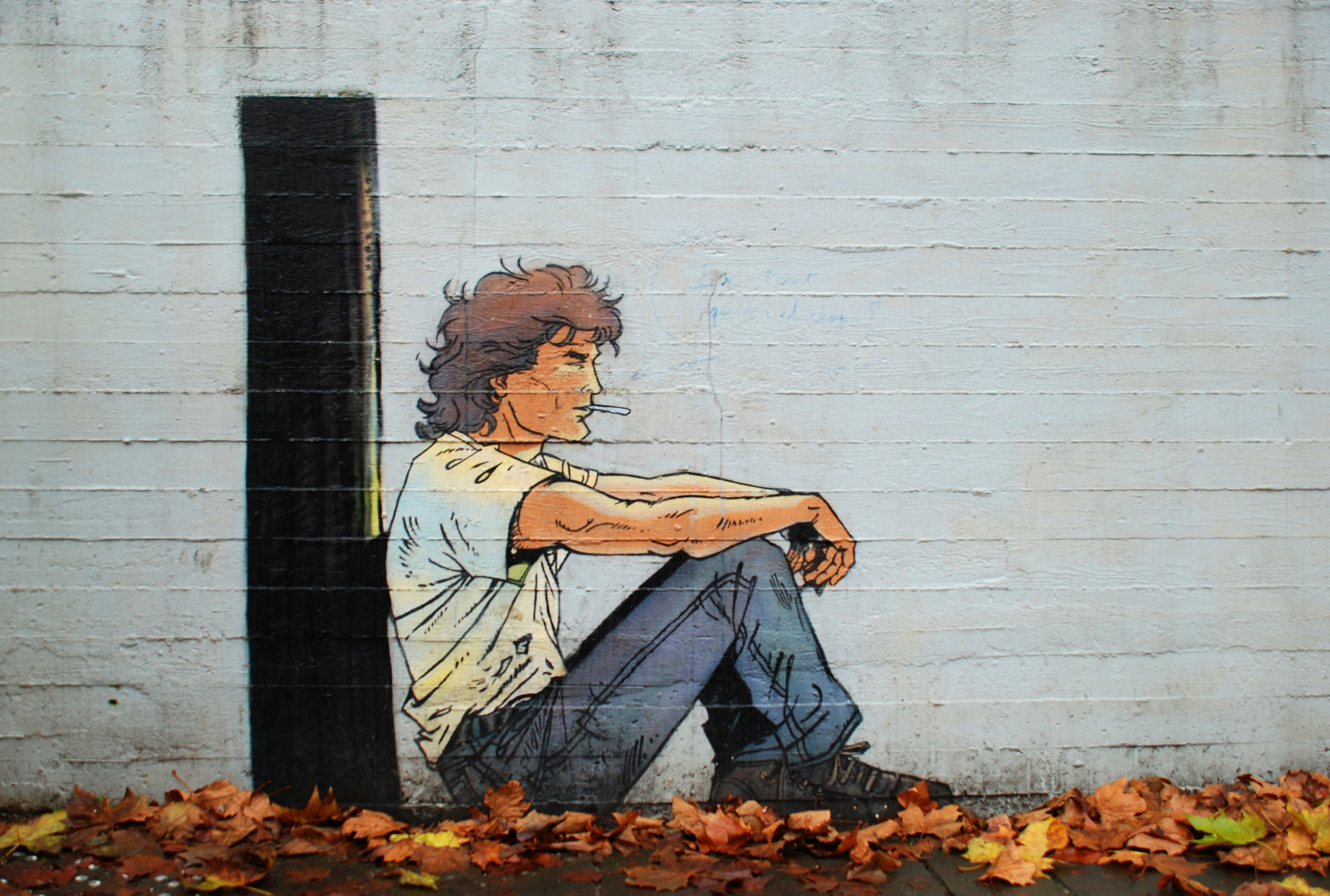
Largo Winch mural in Louvain-la-Neuve (Belgium).

Philippe Francq (French: [fʁɑ̃k]; born 13 December 1961) is a Belgian comics artist, best known for the series Largo Winch.

== Biography ==
Philippe Francq was born in Etterbeek in 1961. He was since his youth an ardent comic reader, who grew up with the comics from Tintin magazine from the 1950s. His early favourites were Blake and Mortimer, Spike and Suzy, Alix and The Adventures of Tintin. He finished studying comic drawing at the Saint Luc Academy in Brussels when he was 23.

After some minor success with Des villes et des femmes and Léo Tomasini (both at Dargaud), he met author Jean Van Hamme, then already one of the most successful European comic authors with Thorgal and XIII, in 1988. Van Hamme offered Francq a comic based on some novels he had written ten years earlier, and this was in 1990 the basis for the series Largo Winch. Since then, this as well has become an extremely successful series, with initial sales of over 600,000 copies per album in French alone, and is now the only series Francq makes anymore, at a rate of one album a year. Philippe Francq lives in the South of France.

== Bibliography ==
Series	Years	Volumes	Scenarist	Editor
Des villes et des femmes	1987–1988	2	Bob de Groot	Dargaud
Léo Tomasini	1988–1989	2	Francis Delvaux	Dargaud
Largo Winch	1990-	18	Jean Van Hamme	Dupuis

== Awards ==
- 1992: Nominated for Best Cover and Best Long Comic strip at the Haxtur Awards, Spain
- 1994: Best Drawing at the Haxtur Awards
- 1996: Best Long Comic Strip at the Haxtur Awards
- 2003: Nominated for the Audience Award at the Angoulême International Comics Festival, France
- 2004: Nominated for Best Long Comic Strip at the Haxtur Awards
- 2006: Nominated for the Audience Award at the Angoulême International Comics Festival
