= 25th César Awards =

2000 French film awards ceremony

- Date: 19 February 2000
- Site: Théâtre des Champs-Élysées, Paris, France
- Hosted by: Alain Chabat

Highlights
- Best Film: Venus Beauty Institute
- Best Actor: Daniel Auteuil
- Best Actress: Karin Viard

Television coverage
- Network: Canal+

The 25th César Awards ceremony, presented by the Académie des Arts et Techniques du Cinéma, honoured the best films of 1999 in France and took place on 19 February 2000 at the Théâtre des Champs-Élysées in Paris. The ceremony was chaired by Alain Delon and hosted by Alain Chabat. Venus Beauty Institute won the award for Best Film.

== Winners and nominees ==
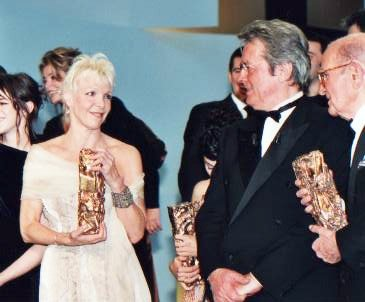
Tonie Marshall (left), Best Director winner, and President of the Ceremony Alain Delon

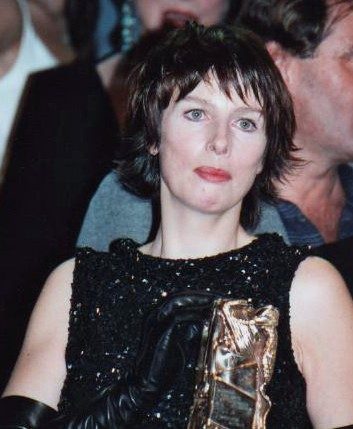
Karin Viard, Best Actress winner

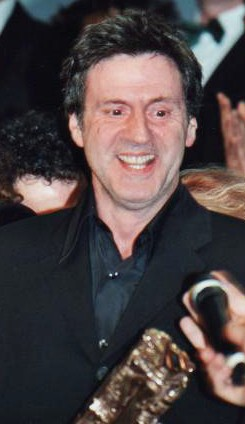
Daniel Auteuil, Best Actor winner

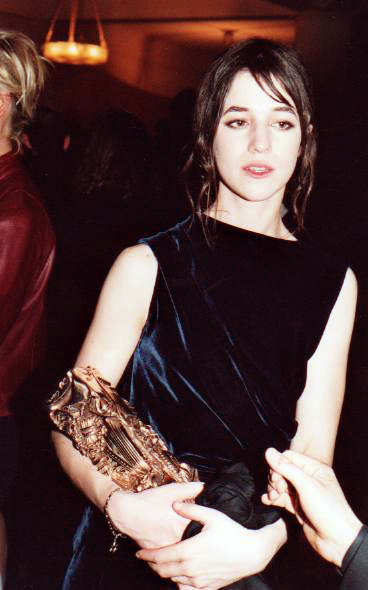
Charlotte Gainsbourg, Best Supporting Actress winner

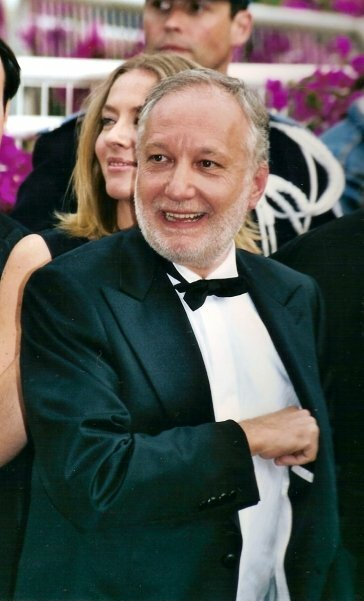
François Berléand, Best Supporting Actor winner

Best Film Venus Beauty Institute: The Children of the Marshland; East/West; Girl on the Bridge; The Messenger: The Story of Joan of Arc	Best Director Tonie Marshall – Venus Beauty Institute: Jean Becker – The Children of the Marshland; Luc Besson – The Messenger: The Story of Joan of Arc; Michel Deville – Sachs' Disease; Patrice Leconte – Girl on the Bridge; Régis Wargnier – East/West
Best Actor Daniel Auteuil – Girl on the Bridge: Jean-Pierre Bacri – Kennedy et moi; Albert Dupontel – Sachs' Disease; Vincent Lindon – My Little Business; Philippe Torreton – It All Starts Today	Best Actress Karin Viard – Haut les cœurs!: Nathalie Baye – Venus Beauty Institute; Sandrine Bonnaire – East/West; Catherine Frot – The Dilettante; Vanessa Paradis – Girl on the Bridge
Best Supporting Actor François Berléand – My Little Business: Jacques Dufilho – C'est quoi la vie?; André Dussollier – The Children of the Marshland; Claude Rich – Season's Beatings; Roschdy Zem – My Little Business	Best Supporting Actress Charlotte Gainsbourg – Season's Beatings: Catherine Mouchet – My Little Business; Bulle Ogier – Venus Beauty Institute; Line Renaud – Belle maman; Mathilde Seigner – Venus Beauty Institute
Most Promising Actor Eric Caravaca – C'est quoi la vie?: Clovis Cornillac – Karnaval; Romain Duris – Peut-être; Laurent Lucas – Haut les cœurs!; Robinson Stévenin – Bad Company	Most Promising Actress Audrey Tautou – Venus Beauty Institute: Barbara Schulz – The Dilettante; Valentina Cervi – Rien sur Robert; Émilie Dequenne – Rosetta; Sylvie Testud – Karnaval
Best Original Screenplay or Adaptation Venus Beauty Institute – Tonie Marshall: Girl on the Bridge – Serge Frydman; My Little Business – Pierre Jolivet and Simon Michaël; Sachs' Disease – Michel Deville; Season's Beatings – Christopher and Danièle Thompson	Best First Feature Film Voyages: Haut les cœurs!; Les Convoyeurs attendent; Karnaval; Season's Beatings
Best Cinematography Éric Guichard – Himalaya: Jean-Marie Dreujou – Girl on the Bridge; Thierry Arbogast – The Messenger: The Story of Joan of Arc	Best Editing Emmanuelle Castro – Voyages: Joëlle Hache – Girl on the Bridge; Sylvie Landra – The Messenger: The Story of Joan of Arc
Best Sound François Groult, Bruno Tarrière and Vincent Tulli – The Messenger: The Story of Joan of Arc: William Flageollet and Guillaume Sciama – The Children of the Marshland; Dominique Hennequin and Paul Lainé – Girl on the Bridge	Best Original Music Bruno Coulais – Himalaya: Pierre Bachelet – The Children of the Marshland; Patrick Doyle – East/West; Éric Serra – The Messenger: The Story of Joan of Arc
Best Costume Design Catherine Leterrier – The Messenger: The Story of Joan of Arc: Eve-Marie Arnault – Rembrandt; Gabriella Pescucci and Caroline de Vivaise – Time Regained	Best Production Design Philippe_Chiffre – Rembrandt: Jean Rabasse – Asterix & Obelix Take On Caesar; Hugues Tissandier – The Messenger: The Story of Joan of Arc; François Emmanuelli – Peut-être
Best Short Film Dirtie Basterdz: À l'ombre des grands baobabs; Anna's Trip; Camping sauvage; 17, rue Bleue	Best Foreign Film All About My Mother: Being John Malkovich; Eyes Wide Shut; Ghost Dog: The Way of the Samurai; The Thin Red Line
Honorary César Josiane Balasko; Georges Cravenne; Jean-Pierre Léaud; Martin Scorsese

== See also ==
- 72nd Academy Awards
- 53rd British Academy Film Awards
- 12th European Film Awards
- 5th Lumière Awards
