= Karin Viard =

French actress

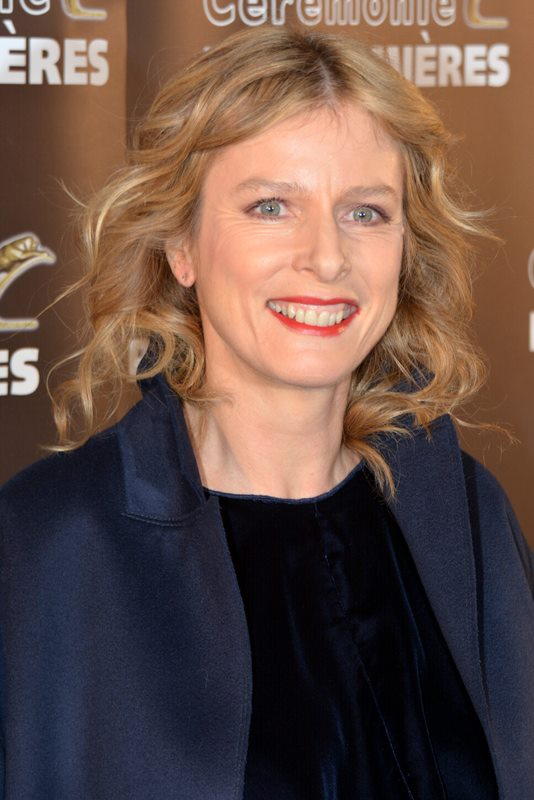
- Viard in 2015
- Born: 24 January 1966 (age 60); Rouen, France
- Occupation: Actress
- Years active: 1986–present
- Spouse: Laurent Machuel (m. 1992; div. 2017)
- Children: 2

Karin Viard (French: [ka.ʁin vjaʁ]; born 24 January 1966) is a French actress. She made her film debut in Tatie Danielle in 1990. She has appeared in films such as Delicatessen, Time Out (L'Emploi du temps), Adultère, mode d'emploi (Adultery: A User's Guide) and La parenthèse enchantée (The Enchanted Interlude).

Viard was a member of the 2003 Cannes Film Festival jury.

== Life and career ==
Viard was educated at the Lycée Pierre Corneille in Rouen.

Viard has won three César Awards. The first in 2000 for Best Actress for her role in Haut les cœurs!, the second in 2003 for Best Supporting Actress for Embrassez qui vous voudrez and the third in 2019, in the same category for Little Tickles. Overall, she has been nominated for the César Awards 13 times.

Viard has also won the Best Actress award at the Montréal World Film Festival for her performance in Le Rôle de sa vie.

== Personal life ==
From 1992 to 2017, Karin Viard lived with Laurent Machuel, director of photography, cameraman and sound engineer; together they had two daughters, Marguerite (1998) and Simone (2000).

== Theatre ==
Year	Title	Author	Director
1988-89	Nina, c'est autre chose	Michel Vinaver	Jean-Christian Grinevald
1989	La Famille	Lodewijk de Boer	Jean-Christian Grinevald
1992	Inaccessibles Amours	Paul Emond	Abbès Zahmani
1993	Les Filles du néant ou le guignol de dieu	Maurice Attias	Maurice Attias
1995-96	Inaccessibles Amours	Paul Emond	Abbès Zahmani
2008-09	La Estupidez	Rafael Spregelburd	Marcial Di Fonzo Bo & Élise Vigier
2011	Love, Loss, and What I Wore	Nora & Delia Ephron	Danièle Thompson
2012	Lúcido	Rafael Spregelburd	Marcial Di Fonzo Bo
2016-18	Vera	Petr Zelenka	Marcial Di Fonzo Bo & Élise Vigier

== Filmography ==
=== Cinema ===
Year	Title	Role	Director	Notes
1986	La goula		Roger Guillot	Short
1986	L'amour en marche	The woman	Bruno Chiche	Short
1990	Tatie Danielle	Agathe	Étienne Chatiliez	
1990	Parechocs	Liliane	Michel Thibaud	Short
1990	La mort d'une vache	The butcher	Dante Desarthe	Short
1991	Delicatessen	Mademoiselle Plusse	Jean-Pierre Jeunet & Marc Caro	
1991	La valse des pigeons	The umbrella woman	Michaël Perrotta	
1991	25 décembre 58, 10h36		Diane Bertrand	Short
1992	Riens du tout	Isabelle	Cédric Klapisch	
1992	Max et Jérémie	The girl	Claire Devers	
1993	La nage indienne	Clara	Xavier Durringer	Nominated - César Award for Most Promising Actress
1993	Ce que femme veut...	Cécile	Gérard Jumel	
1993	Zone bleue	The woman	Catherine Morlat	Short
1993	Elles étaient trois		Laurent Boulanger	Short
1994	La Séparation	Claire	Christian Vincent	
1994	The Favourite Son	Martine	Nicole Garcia	
1995	Fast	The yellow hair girl	Dante Desarthe	
1995	La Haine	Gallery girl	Mathieu Kassovitz	
1995	Emmène-moi	Sophie	Michel Spinosa	
1995	Adultery: A User's Guide	Fabienne Corteggiani	Christine Pascal	Festival International du Film Francophone de Namur: Best Actress
1995	Une journée entière sans mentir	Claire	Philippe Kotlarski	Short
1996	Fourbi	Rosemonde	Alain Tanner	
1996	Les victimes	Claire Jaillac	Patrick Grandperret	
1996	Le journal du séducteur	Charlotte	Danièle Dubroux	
1996	Une visite	Carole	Philippe Harel	Short
1997	Les randonneurs	Coralie	Philippe Harel	Nominated - César Award for Best Supporting Actress
1997	Je ne vois pas ce qu'on me trouve	Monica	Christian Vincent	
1997	Où tu vas	Nadine	Frédéric Gélard	Short
1997	Rouen, cinq minutes d'arrêt	Marguerite	Ingrid Gogny	Short
1999	Mes amis	Lola	Michel Hazanavicius	
1999	Haut les cœurs!	Emma	Sólveig Anspach	César Award for Best Actress; Lumière Award for Best Actress; Ghent International Film Festival - Acting Ensemble
1999	La nouvelle Ève	Camille	Catherine Corsini	B-Movie Film Festival - Best Actress
1999	Children of the Century	Marie Dorval	Diane Kurys	
2000	La parenthèse enchantée	Eve	Michel Spinosa	
2001	Time Out	Muriel	Laurent Cantet	
2001	A Hell of a Day	Hortense Lassalle	Marion Vernoux	
2001	Un jeu d'enfants	Marianne Fauvel	Laurent Tuel	
2002	Summer Things	Véronique	Michel Blanc	César Award for Best Supporting Actress
2002	Mes copines		Anne Fassio	Short
2003	France Boutique	France Mestral	Tonie Marshall	
2004	The Hook	Suzy Castelano	Thomas Vincent	
2004	The Role of Her Life	Claire Rocher	François Favrat	Montreal World Film Festival - Best Actress; Nominated - César Award for Best Actress
2005	Hell	Céline	Danis Tanović	
2005	The Axe	Marlène Davert	Costa-Gavras	
2005	Les enfants	Jeanne Lancry	Christian Vincent	
2005	The Ex-Wife of My Life	Nina	Josiane Balasko	
2007	Les ambitieux	Judith Zahn	Catherine Corsini	Alpe d'Huez International Comedy Film Festival - Best Acting
2007	La face cachée	Isabelle	Bernard Campan	
2007	La tête de maman	Juliette Gotchac	Carine Tardieu	
2007	La vérité ou presque	Anne	Sam Karmann	
2008	Paris	The baker	Cédric Klapisch	Nominated - César Award for Best Supporting Actress
2008	Baby Blues	Alexandra	Diane Bertrand	
2008	Les randonneurs à Saint-Tropez	Coralie	Philippe Harel	
2009	Happy End	Chloé	Arnaud & Jean-Marie Larrieu	
2009	Change of Plans	Marie-Laurence Claverne	Danièle Thompson	
2009	All About Actresses	Herself	Maïwenn	
2010	Potiche	Nadège Dumoulin	François Ozon	Nominated - César Award for Best Supporting Actress
2010	My Father's Guests	Babette Paumelle	Anne Le Ny	
2011	Polisse	Nadine	Maïwenn	Globes de Cristal Award for Best Actress; Nominated - César Award for Best Actress; Nominated - Lumière Award for Best Actress
2011	Le Skylab	Albertine	Julie Delpy	
2011	Nothing to Declare	Irène Janus	Dany Boon	
2011	My Piece of the Pie	France	Cédric Klapisch	
2012	On Air	Claire Martin / Mélina	Pierre Pinaud	
2013	Des gens qui s'embrassent	Herself	Danièle Thompson	
2014	Almost Friends	Marithé Bressy	Anne Le Ny	
2014	Lulu femme nue	Lulu	Sólveig Anspach	Lumière Award for Best Actress
2014	La Famille Bélier	Gigi Bélier	Éric Lartigau	Nominated - César Award for Best Actress
2014	Weekends in Normandy	Christine	Anne Villacèque	
2014	Love Is the Perfect Crime	Marianne	Arnaud & Jean-Marie Larrieu	
2015	Lolo	Ariane	Julie Delpy	
2015	Families	Florence Deffe	Jean-Paul Rappeneau	
2015	21 Nights with Pattie	Pattie	Arnaud & Jean-Marie Larrieu	Bucheon International Fantastic Film Festival - Best Actress; Nominated - César Award for Best Supporting Actress
2015	The Roommates Party	Christine Dubreuil	Alexandra Leclère	
2016	Le petit locataire	Nicole Payan	Nadège Loiseau	
2016	The Visitors: Bastille Day	Adélaïde de Montmirail	Jean-Marie Poiré	
2017	Jalouse	Nathalie Pécheux	David & Stéphane Foenkinos	Globes de Cristal Award for Best Actress; Nominated - César Award for Best Actress; Nominated - Lumière Award for Best Actress
2018	Bécassine	Hermine	Bruno Podalydès	
2018	Little Tickles	Mado Le Nadant	Andrea Bescond & Eric Metayer	César Award for Best Supporting Actress; Globes de Cristal Award for Best Actress
2018	Voyez comme on danse	Véronique	Michel Blanc	
2019	Perfect Nanny	Louise	Lucie Borleteau	Nominated - César Award for Best Actress; Nominated - Lumière Award for Best Actress
2020	Les apparences	Eve Monlibert	Marc Fitoussi	
2021	Fantasies	Lili Michel	David & Stéphane Foenkinos	
2021	Dear Mother	Valérie Bordier	Laurent Lafitte	
2021	Tokyo Shaking	Alexandra Pacquart	Olivier Peyon	
2022	Une mère	Aline Morel	Sylvie Audcoeur	
2022	Maria rêve	Maria Rodrigues	Lauriane Escaffre & Yvo Muller	
2022	Three Times Nothing	The raclette lady	Nadège Loiseau	
2023	Wahou!	Catherine Bourbialle	Bruno Podalydès	
2023	Une nuit	Nathalie	Alex Lutz	
2023	Magnificat	Charlotte Rivière	Virginie Sauveur	
2023	Sage-homme	Nathalie Martini	Jennifer Devoldère	
2023	Nouveau départ	Diane Huysmans	Philippe Lefebvre	
2024	Madame de Sévigné	Marie de Sévigné	Isabelle Brocard	
2025	Fils de		Carlos Abascal Peiro	
2025	Le dernier souffle	The cancerologist	Costa-Gavras	
2025	Une fille en dessous de tout	Herself	Jean-Luc Gaget	

=== Television ===
Year	Title	Role	Director	Notes
1989	Les enquêtes du commissaire Maigret	Céline Bertaud	Jean-Paul Sassy	TV series (1 episode)
1991	L'amant de ma soeur	Elise	Pierre Mondy	TV movie
1991	Strangers dans la nuit	Noëlle Faucher	Sylvain Madigan	TV movie
1991	Les gens ne sont pas forcément ignobles	Philippine	Bernard Murat	TV movie
1992	Urgence d'aimer	Anne-Victoire	Philippe Le Guay	TV movie
1992	Maigret	Thérèse	Bertrand Van Effenterre	TV series (1 episode)
1993	Rhésus Roméo	Anne-Victoire	Philippe Le Guay	TV movie
2012	Yann Piat, chronique d'un assassinat	Yann Piat	Antoine de Caunes	TV movie
2019-20	Calls	Roxane Donner	Timothée Hochet	TV series (3 episodes)
2021	La Vengeance au Triple Galop	Miranda Bloomberg	Alex Lutz & Arthur Sanigou	TV movie
2024	Dans l'ombre	Marie-France Trémeau	Pierre Schoeller & Guillaume Senez	TV mini-series
