= Sabine Azéma =

French actress and director

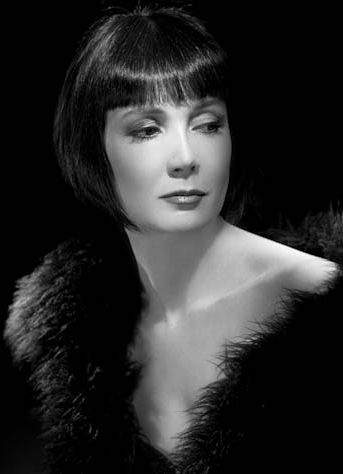
- Portrait in 1996
- Born: 20 September 1949 (age 76); Paris, France
- Occupations: Stage and film actress, director
- Years active: 1975–present
- Spouse(s): Michel Lengliney (1973–?); Alain Resnais (1998–2014; his death)

Sabine Azéma (born 20 September 1949) is a French stage and film actress and director.

Born in Paris, she graduated from the Paris Conservatory of Dramatic Arts.

== Career ==
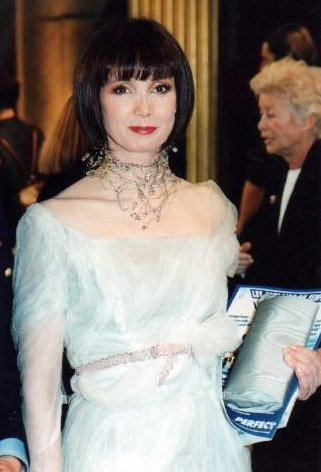
Sabine Azéma at the César Awards ceremony in 1998 .

Her film career began in 1975. Azéma appeared in A Sunday in the Country (1984), for which she won a César Award for Best Actress, and numerous films of Alain Resnais, including Life Is a Bed of Roses (1983), L'Amour à mort (1984), Mélo (which won her a second César Award for Best Actress), Smoking/No Smoking (1993), On connaît la chanson (1997), Pas sur la bouche (2003), and Cœurs (2006). She has been nominated a further five times.

== Filmography ==
=== As actress ===
Year	Title	Role	Director
1976	On aura tout vu ("The Bottom Line")	Claude Ferroni	Georges Lautner
1976	Le Chasseur de chez Maxim's	Geneviève	Claude Vital
1977	La Dentellière ("The Lacemaker")	Corinne	Claude Goretta
1981	On n'est pas des anges... elles non plus	Marie-Louise	Michel Lang
1983	La vie est un roman ("Life Is a Bed of Roses")	Elisabeth	Alain Resnais
1984	Un dimanche à la campagne ("A Sunday in the Country")	Irène	Bertrand Tavernier
1984	L'Amour à mort ("Love Unto Death")	Elisabeth	Alain Resnais
1985	Zone rouge ("Zone Red")	Claire	Robert Enrico
1986	Mélo	Romaine	Alain Resnais
1986	La Puritaine ("The Prude")	Ariane	Jacques Doillon
1989	La Vie et rien d'autre ("Life and Nothing But")	Irène	Bertrand Tavernier
1989	Vanille fraise ("Vanilla-Strawberry")	Clarisse	Gérard Oury
1989	Cinq jours en juin ("Five Days In June")	Yvette	Michel Legrand
1991	Rossini! Rossini!	Olympe Pélissier	Mario Monicelli
1993	Smoking/No Smoking	Celia/Sylvie / Irene / Rowena / Josephine	Alain Resnais
1995	Les Cent et Une Nuits de Simon Cinéma ("A Hundred and One Nights")	Sabine/Irène	Agnès Varda
1995	Le bonheur est dans le pré ("Happiness Is in the Field")	Nicole	Étienne Chatiliez
1995	Mon homme ("My Man")	Bérangère	Bertrand Blier
1995	Noir comme le souvenir ("Black for Remembrance")	Lucy	Jean-Pierre Mocky
1997	On connaît la chanson ("Same Old Song")	Odile	Alain Resnais
1999	Le schpountz	Françoise	Gérard Oury
1999	La Bûche ("Season's Beatings")	Louba	Danièle Thompson
2000	La Chambre des officiers ("The Officers' Ward")	Anaïs	François Dupeyron
2001	Tanguy	Edith Guetz	Étienne Chatiliez
2003	Pas sur la bouche ("Not on the Lips")	Gilberte Valandray	Alain Resnais
2003	Le Mystère de la chambre jaune ("The Mystery of the Yellow Room")	Mathilde Stangerson	Bruno Podalydès
2005	The Perfume of the Lady in Black	Mathilde Stangerson	Bruno Podalydès
2005	Peindre ou faire l'Amour ("To Paint or Make Love")	Madeleine	Arnaud Larrieu et Jean-Marie Larrieu
2005	Olé !	Alexandra Veber	Florence Quentin
2006	Cœurs ("Private Fears in Public Places")	Charlotte	Alain Resnais
2007	Faut que ça danse ! ("Let's Dance")	Violette	Noémie Lvovsky
2008	Le Voyage aux Pyrénées ("Journey to the Pyrenees")	Aurore Lalu	Arnaud et Jean-Marie Larrieu
2009	Les Herbes folles	Marguerite Muir	Alain Resnais
2009	Les Derniers Jours du monde ("Happy End")	the Marquise of Arcangues	Arnaud et Jean-Marie Larrieu
2010	Donnant Donnant	Jeanne	Isabelle Mergault
2011	La Fille du puisatier ("The Well-Digger's Daughter")	Madame Mazel	Daniel Auteuil
2012	Vous n'avez encore rien vu	Eurydice I	Alain Resnais
2013	Aimer, boire et chanter ("Life of Riley")	Kathryn	Alain Resnais
2014	Tante Hilda ("Aunt Hilda")	Aunt Hilda	Benoît Chieux, Jacques-Rémy Girerd
2015	Cosmos	Madame Woytis	Andrzej Żuławski
2016	Cézanne and I	Elisabeth Cézanne	Danièle Thompson
2016	Ma famille t'adore déjà	Dahlia	Jérôme Commandeur & Alan Corno
2017	Raid dingue	Marie-Caroline Dubarry	Dany Boon
2017	Knock	La Cuq	Lorraine Lévy
2021	Secret Name	Eléonore de Lengwil	Aurélia Georges

=== As director ===
Year	Title	Cast	Notes
1992	Bonjour Monsieur Doisneau	Robert Doisneau as himself	Documentary film
1997	Quand le chat sourit	Pierre Arditi, Jane Birkin	TV film

== Decorations ==
- Commander of the Order of Arts and Letters (2015)
