= Gérard Watkins =

British and French actor (born 1965)

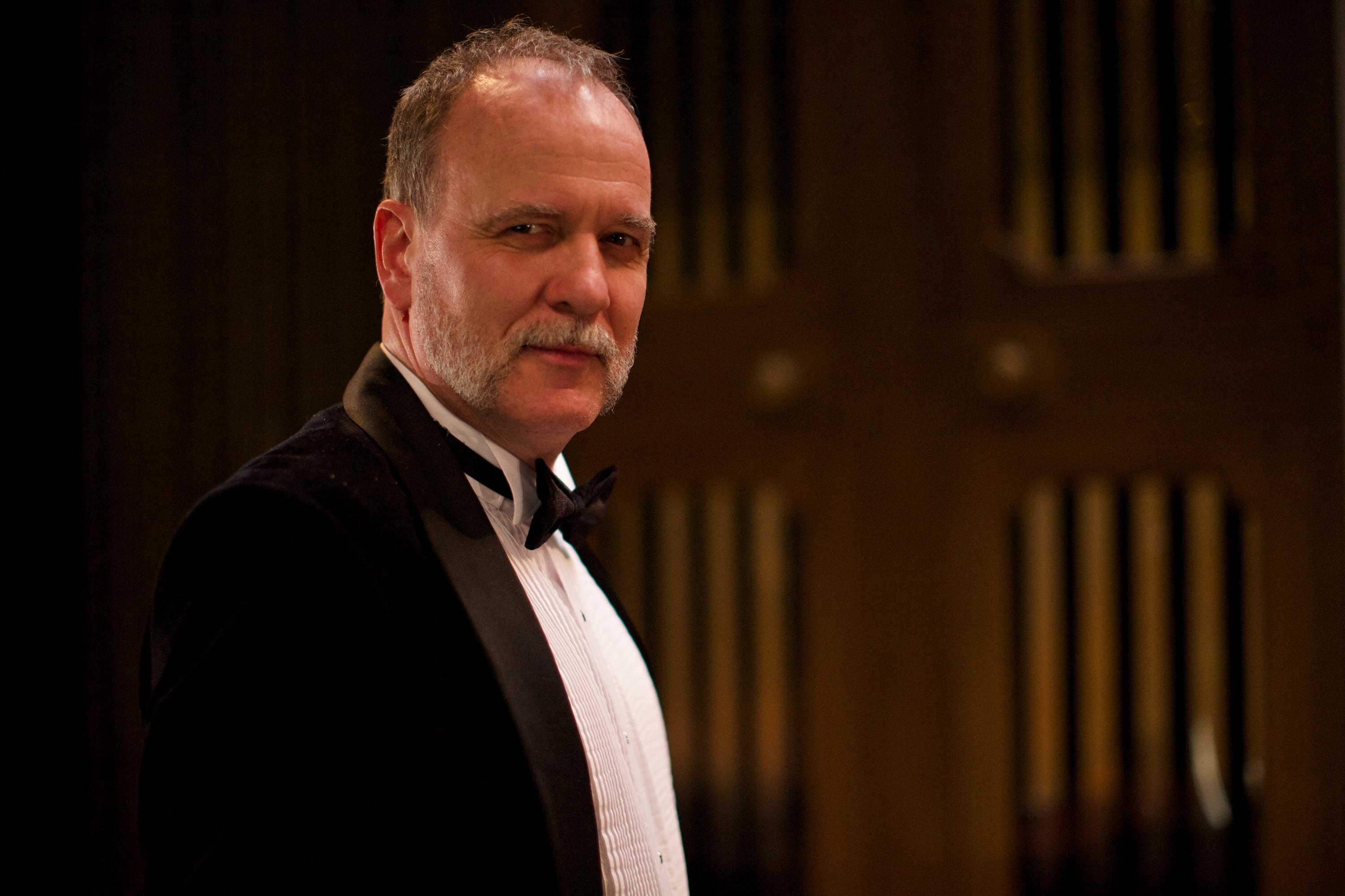
- Watkins as Claudius in Hamlet, 2020
- Born: 4 July 1965 (age 60); London, England
- Citizenship: United Kingdom; France
- Occupations: Actor; Playwright; Director; Songwriter
- Years active: 1980–present
- Awards: Grand Prix de littérature dramatique

Gérard Watkins (born 4 July 1965) is a British and French actor, playwright, director, and songwriter.

He graduated from Lycée de St Germain en Laye in 1983.

As a stage actor, he has performed in over forty productions in Paris with such directors as Véronique Bellegarde, Julie Beres, Jean-Claude Buchard, Elizabeth Chailloux, Michel Didym, André Engel, Frederic Fisbach, Marc François, Daniel Jeanneteau, Philipe Lanton, Jean-Louis Martinelli, Lars Noren, Claude Régy, Yann Ritsema, Bernard Sobel, Viviane Theophilides, and Jean-Pierre Vincent.

Among his critically acclaimed performances are Ian in Sarah Kane's Blasted, Edmond in King Lear, and Rosalind in As You Like It. In the cinema, he is perhaps best known for his role in the 2008 film Taken as Patrice Saint Clair, the sex trafficking kingpin who runs the operation that kidnapped the protagonist's 17-year-old daughter, but he has also performed with directors such as Julie Lopes-Curval, Jérome Salle, Yann Samuel, Julian Schnabel, Hugo Santiago, and Peter Watkins. Since 1994, he has directed his own theatre company, the Perdita Ensemble, where he has staged all of his plays, The Secret Capital, Follow Me, The Tower, In the Faraway Forest, Icone, Identity, Lost (Replay), and I Don't Remember Very Well.

He is fluent in both English and French.

He was awarded the Grand Prix de littérature dramatique in 2010 for his play Identité.

== Filmography ==
Year	Title	Role	Notes
1986	On a volé Charlie Spencer	Le soldat américain du film	
1987	Sécurité publique		
1987	Travelling avant		
1992	L'ambassade en folie	Techtronics guard #1	
2000	La Commune (Paris, 1871)	Gérard Bourlet	
2002	Le Loup de la côte Ouest	Harry	
2003	Love Me If You Dare	Julien's father	
2004	They Came Back	Le fils du maire	
2006	Je me fais rare	Acteur 1	
2007	The Diving Bell and the Butterfly	Le Docteur Cocheton	
2008	La Fabrique des sentiments	Michel	
2008	Taken	Patrice Saint-Clair	
2008	Largo Winch	Cattaneo	
2009	La Femme invisible	Paul	
2009	Hidden Diary	Gilles	
2009	Going South	The father	
2010	Rebecca H. (Return to the Dogs)	Detective	
2014	Colt 45	Calhoun	
2016	The Odyssey	Le maître de cérémonie	
2018	Naked Normandy	Volker	
2019	Savages (Les Sauvages)		TV series
2021	The Accusation	L'avocat général	
2025	Stereo Girls	Pierre	
