= Carole Franck =

French actress

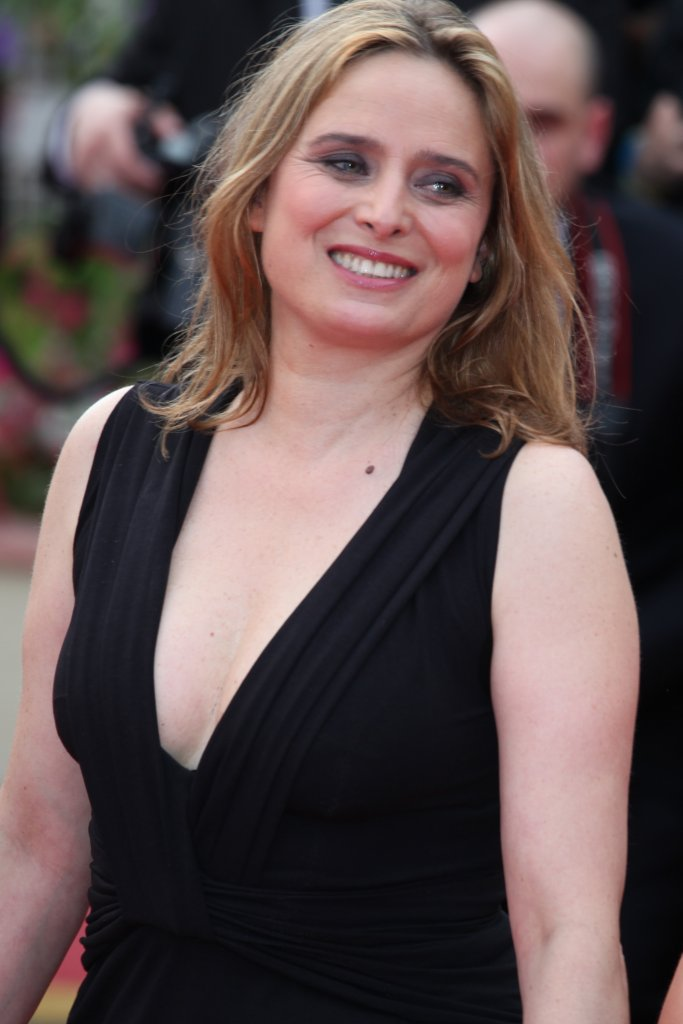
- Carole Franck at the 2010 Cannes Film Festival
- Occupation: Actress
- Years active: 1989–present

Carole Franck is a French actress.

== Filmography ==
Year	Title	Role	Director	Notes
1989	Mama, There's a Man in Your Bed	The Receptionist	Coline Serreau	
1989	Vanille fraise	Maryse	Gérard Oury	
1991	Le coup suprême		Jean-Pierre Sentier	
1991	La Vénus à Lulu		Daniel Losset	TV movie
1992	Sept années	A Girl	Virginie Apiou	Short
1993	L'instinct de l'ange		Richard Dembo	
1994	Pas de perdant		Franck Saint-Cast	
1994	Le paradis absolument	Myriam	Patrick Volson	TV movie
1994	Due volte vent'anni	Mireille	Livia Giampalmo	TV movie
1994	L'instit	Claire	Philippe Triboit	TV series (1 episode)
1996	The Proprietor	The Shop Assistant	Ismail Merchant	
1997	Julie Lescaut	Caroline Turpin	Alain Wermus	TV series (1 episode)
1998	Le feu sous la glace	Isabelle	Françoise Decaux-Thomelet	TV movie
1998	Avocats & associés	Claire Botelli	Philippe Triboit (2)	TV series (1 episode)
1999	Le schpountz	Production Company Hostess	Gérard Oury (2)	
1999	Swamp !	Carole	Eric Bu	
2000	Poetical Refugee	Barbara	Abdellatif Kechiche	Angers European First Film Festival - Jean Carment Award
2000	La tribu de Zoé	Clovis's Friend	Pierre Joassin	TV movie
2000	Les Cordier, juge et flic	Madame Teisseire	Alain Wermus (2)	TV series (1 episode)
2001	Les duettistes: Le môme	Valérie	Denys Granier-Deferre	TV movie
2003	Games of Love and Chance	The French Professor	Abdellatif Kechiche (2)	
2003	Une preuve d'amour	Marie-Françoise	Bernard Stora	TV movie
2004	Destination	The Owner	Fabrice Camoin	Short
2005	Russian Dolls	The TV Producer	Cédric Klapisch	
2005	Hotel California		Nigel Bennet	Short
2005	La visite	Marie Séguier	Pierre Sisser	TV movie
2005	Diane, femme flic	The Judge	Étienne Dhaene	TV series (1 episode)
2005-08	Groupe flag	Bernard's Psy	Étienne Dhaene (2) & Michel Hassan	TV series (5 episodes)
2006	Toi et moi	Sandrine	Julie Lopes-Curval	
2006	Blame It on Fidel	Sister Geneviève	Julie Gavras	
2006	Les Européens	Dr. Rebecca Franck	Sólveig Anspach	
2006	Le bal perdu	Lydia	Alfredo Diaz Perez	Short
2006	Joséphine, ange gardien	Antoine's Wife	Vincent Monnet	TV series (1 episode)
2006	Navarro	The Doctor	Philippe Davin	TV series (1 episode)
2007	All Is Forgiven	Martine	Mia Hansen-Løve	
2007	The Secret of the Grain	Guy's Neighbor	Abdellatif Kechiche (3)	
2007	Les murs porteurs	The Nurse	Cyril Gelblat	
2007	Fille unique	Barbara	Julie Bonan	Short
2007	Ravages	Valérie	Christophe Lamotte	TV movie
2007	Sauveur Giordano	Captain Honnel	Pierre Joassin (2)	TV series (1 episode)
2007	Le juge est une femme	Claire Blanchet	René Manzor	TV series (1 episode)
2008	With a Little Help from Myself	The Inspector	François Dupeyron	
2008	Les liens du sang	Monique	Jacques Maillot	
2008	L'autre rive	Françoise	Fabrice Camoin (2)	Short
2008	Nicolas Le Floch	Madame de Pompadour	Edwin Baily	TV series (1 episode)
2009	Hidden Diary	Evelyne	Julie Lopes-Curval (2)	
2009	I'm Glad My Mother Is Alive	The Orphanage's Director	Claude & Nathan Miller	
2009	Paradis criminel	Hilda Tocqueville	Serge Meynard	TV movie
2009	Un singe sur le dos	Jeanne	Jacques Maillot (2)	TV movie
2009	P.J.	Valérie	Akim Isker	TV series (1 episode)
2009	Enquêtes réservées	Evelyne Lelong	Patrick Dewolf	TV series (1 episode)
2010	The Names of Love	Cécile Delivet Benmahmoud	Michel Leclerc	
2010	Un soupçon d'innocence	Florence	Olivier Péray	TV movie
2011	Polisse	Céline	Maïwenn	
2011	Léa	Philippine	Bruno Rolland	
2011	La mer à boire	Hyacinthe	Jacques Maillot (3)	
2011	La fille de sa mère	Fanny	Eric Bu (2)	Short
2011	E-love	Rachel	Anne Villacèque	TV movie
2011	Insoupçonnable	Hélène	Benoît d'Aubert	TV movie
2012	Amour	The Nurse	Michael Haneke	
2012	Parle tout bas, Si c'est d'amour	Sylvie	Sylvain Monod	TV movie
2012	The Returned	Mademoiselle Payet	Fabrice Gobert	TV series (3 episodes)
2013	Young & Beautiful	The Cop	François Ozon	
2013	Les invincibles	Isa	Frédéric Berthe	
2013	Le maillot de bain	Christiane	Mathilde Bayle	Short
2014	In the Courtyard	The Councillor	Pierre Salvadori	
2014	Respire	Sarah's Mother	Mélanie Laurent	
2014	Hippocrate	Myriam	Thomas Lilti	
2015	En équilibre	The Counsel	Denis Dercourt	
2015	Heat Wave	Diane	Raphaël Jacoulot	
2015	I'm All Yours	Paul's sister	Baya Kasmi	
2015	Love at First Child	Caroline	Anne Giafferi	
2015	All Three of Us	Catherine Hanriot	Kheiron	
2015	The Very Private Life of Mister Sim	Audrey	Michel Leclerc	
2015	Jailbirds	Babette	Audrey Estrougo	
2017	See You Up There	Sister Hortense	Albert Dupontel	
2022	For My Country	Public Prosecutor	Rachid Hami	
2024	Emmanuelle	Emmanuelle's mother	Audrey Diwan	

== Dubbing ==
Year	Title	Role	Actress	Director	Notes
1994-95	Earth 2	Dr. Julia Heller	Jessica Steen	Several	TV series (21 episodes)
1995	Living in Oblivion	Nicole Springer	Catherine Keener	Tom DiCillo	
1997	The Real Blonde	Mary	Catherine Keener	Tom DiCillo	
1998	The Hi-Lo Country	Mona Birk	Patricia Arquette	Stephen Frears	
1998	Among Giants	Gerry	Rachel Griffiths	Sam Miller	
1998	The Book of Life	Magdalena	PJ Harvey	Hal Hartley	
1998	Sins of the City	Sam Richardson	Barbara Williams	Several	TV series (13 episodes)
1999	Simpatico	Cecilia	Catherine Keener	Matthew Warchus	
1999	Happy, Texas	Josephine 'Joe' McClintock	Ally Walker	Mark Illsley	
2002	Full Frontal	Lee	Catherine Keener	Steven Soderbergh	
2002	Death to Smoochy	Nora Wells	Catherine Keener	Danny DeVito	
2003	The Singing Detective	Nicola/Nina/Blonde	Robin Wright	Keith Gordon	
2003	I'm Not Scared	Anna Amitrano	Aitana Sánchez-Gijón	Gabriele Salvatores	
2003	Le Dernier Trappeur	Nebraska	May Loo	Nicolas Vanier	
2004-05	ReGenesis	Luisa Raposa	Inga Cadranel	John L'Ecuyer & Jerry Ciccoritti	TV series (2 episodes)
2005	The Ballad of Jack and Rose	Kathleen	Catherine Keener	Rebecca Miller	
2005-07	Gooische Vrouwen	Willemijn Lodewijkx	Annet Malherbe	Several	TV series (25 episodes)
2006	Night at the Museum	Erica Daley	Kim Raver	Shawn Levy	
2007	Death Proof	Zoë Bell	Zoë Bell	Quentin Tarantino	
2007	Dan in Real Life	Eileen Burns	Amy Ryan	Peter Hedges	
2008	Dexter	Inspector Barbara Gianna	Kristin Dattilo	Several	TV series (9 episodes)
2009	The Soloist	Mary Weston	Catherine Keener	Joe Wright	
2009	In the Electric Mist	Rosie Gomez	Justina Machado	Bertrand Tavernier	
2009	A Serious Man	Judith Gopnik	Sari Lennick	Coen brothers	
2010	Tamara Drewe	Zoe	Josie Taylor	Stephen Frears	
2011	The Iron Lady	Carol Thatcher	Olivia Colman	Phyllida Lloyd	
2011	CSI: Miami	Evelyn Bowers	Drea de Matteo	Larry Detwiler	TV series (1 episode)
2012	Oslo, August 31st	Tove	Tone Mostraum	Joachim Trier	
2012	Love Is All You Need	Benedikte	Paprika Steen	Susanne Bier	
2012	Broken	Madame Buckley	Claire Burt	Rufus Norris	
2013	Jimmy P: Psychotherapy of a Plains Indian	Doll	Jennifer Podemski	Arnaud Desplechin	
2013	Blood Ties	Marie Pierzynski	Lili Taylor	Guillaume Canet	
2013	Baby Sellers	Patricia	Venus Terzo	Nick Willing	TV movie
2013	Clara's Deadly Secret	Jane Jenkins	Kate Drummond	Andrew C. Erin	TV movie
2013	Top of the Lake	Anita	Robyn Malcolm	Jane Campion & Garth Davis	TV mini-series

== Theatre ==
Year	Title	Author	Director	Notes
1991	Summer	Edward Bond	René Loyon	Théâtre national de la Colline
1992	Djurdjura	François Bourgeat	Jean-Louis Jacopin	Théâtre de La Criée
1993	Love's Labour's Lost	William Shakespeare	Anthony Tuckey	
1994	A Respectable Wedding	Bertolt Brecht	Juliette Chemilliez	Théâtre de La Criée
1994	Madame de Sade	Yukio Mishima	Olivier Foubert	
1995	Mein Kampf Farce	George Tabori	Claude Grin	
1996	Les Serments indiscrets	Pierre de Marivaux	Yves Goumelon	Festival d'Avignon
1997	Dissonance	Michel Azama	Nicolas Thibault	
1998	Unforgiven Dogs	Claudia Mendez	Ferran Audi	
1999	Fantômas	Marcel Allain & Pierre Souvestre	Nicolas Thibault (2)	
2000	Barbe bleue l'espoir des femmes	Déha Loher	Gilles Dao	
2001	Le Sang	Sergi Belbel	Nicolas Thibault (3)	
