= Jet Lag (film) =

- French theatrical release poster
- French: Décalage Horaire
- Directed by: Danièle Thompson
- Written by: Danièle Thompson; Christopher Thompson
- Produced by: Alain Sarde
- Starring: Juliette Binoche; Jean Reno; Sergi López
- Cinematography: Patrick Blossier
- Edited by: Sylvie Landra
- Music by: Éric Serra
- Production companies: Les Films Alain Sarde; TF1 Films Production; Pathé Productions
- Distributed by: BAC Films (France); StudioCanal (International)
- Release dates: 7 September 2002 (Toronto); 30 October 2002 (France)
- Running time: 91 minutes
- Country: France
- Language: French
- Budget: $13 million
- Box office: $8 million

Jet Lag (French: Décalage Horaire) is a 2002 French romantic comedy film starring Juliette Binoche and Jean Reno. It is the second film directed by Danièle Thompson, following Season's Beatings (1999).

== Premise ==
At Charles de Gaulle Airport in Paris, a French beautician (Juliette Binoche) on her way to a new job in Mexico accidentally meets a French chef (Jean Reno) who has been delayed on his way to Germany from his residence in the United States. Labor strikes, bad weather, and pure luck cause the two of them to share a room overnight at the airport Hilton hotel. Their initial mutual indifference and downright hostility evolves into romance and a re-examination of their lives.

== Cast ==
- Juliette Binoche as Rose
- Jean Reno as Félix
- Sergi López as Sergio
- Scali Delpeyrat as The Doctor
- Karine Belly as Air France Attendant
- Raoul Billerey as Félix's Father
- Nadège Beausson-Diagne as A Roissy Passenger
- Alice Taglioni as Ground Hostess
- Jérôme Keen as The Concierge
- Sébastien Lalanne as The Barman
- Michel Lepriol as The Waiter
- M'bembo as Post Office Employee (as Mbembo)
- Laurence Colussi as Hostess
- Lucy Harrison as Hostess
- Rebecca Steele as Hostess

== Production ==
Danièle Thompson originally wrote the script for Miramax Films in the early 1990s with Isabelle Adjani attached to star in an English-language version. Principal photography began from 5 November 2001.

Thompson obtained permission to film at Charles de Gaulle Airport in Paris prior to September 11, 2001. After the terrorist attacks, permission was withdrawn. Thompson then obtained permission to use Lourdes Airport, but was not convinced that viewers would believe it was Charles de Gaulle. Eventually she managed to gain 10 shooting days access to Paris. The rest was filmed on sets and in Libby Airport.

Décalage Horaire is the second collaboration of mother and son writing team Danièle Thompson & Christophe Thompson after the 1999 film La Bûche.

Décalage Horaire is one of the rare comedies in Juliette Binoche's career, after Les Nanas' (1985) A Couch in New York (1995) and Chocolat (2000).

== Critical response ==
On Rotten Tomatoes, the film holds an approval rating of 56%, based on 66 reviews, with an average rating of 5.8/10. The site's critical consensus reads, " A light and fluffy romantic comedy for fans of Juliette Binoche and Jean Reno." On Metacritic the film has a score of 53 out of 100, based on 28 critics, indicating "mixed or average reviews".

== Accolades ==
Award / Film Festival	Category	Recipients and nominees	Result
César Awards	Best Actress	Juliette Binoche	Nominated
