= Philippe Katerine =

French singer-songwriter, actor, director, and writer

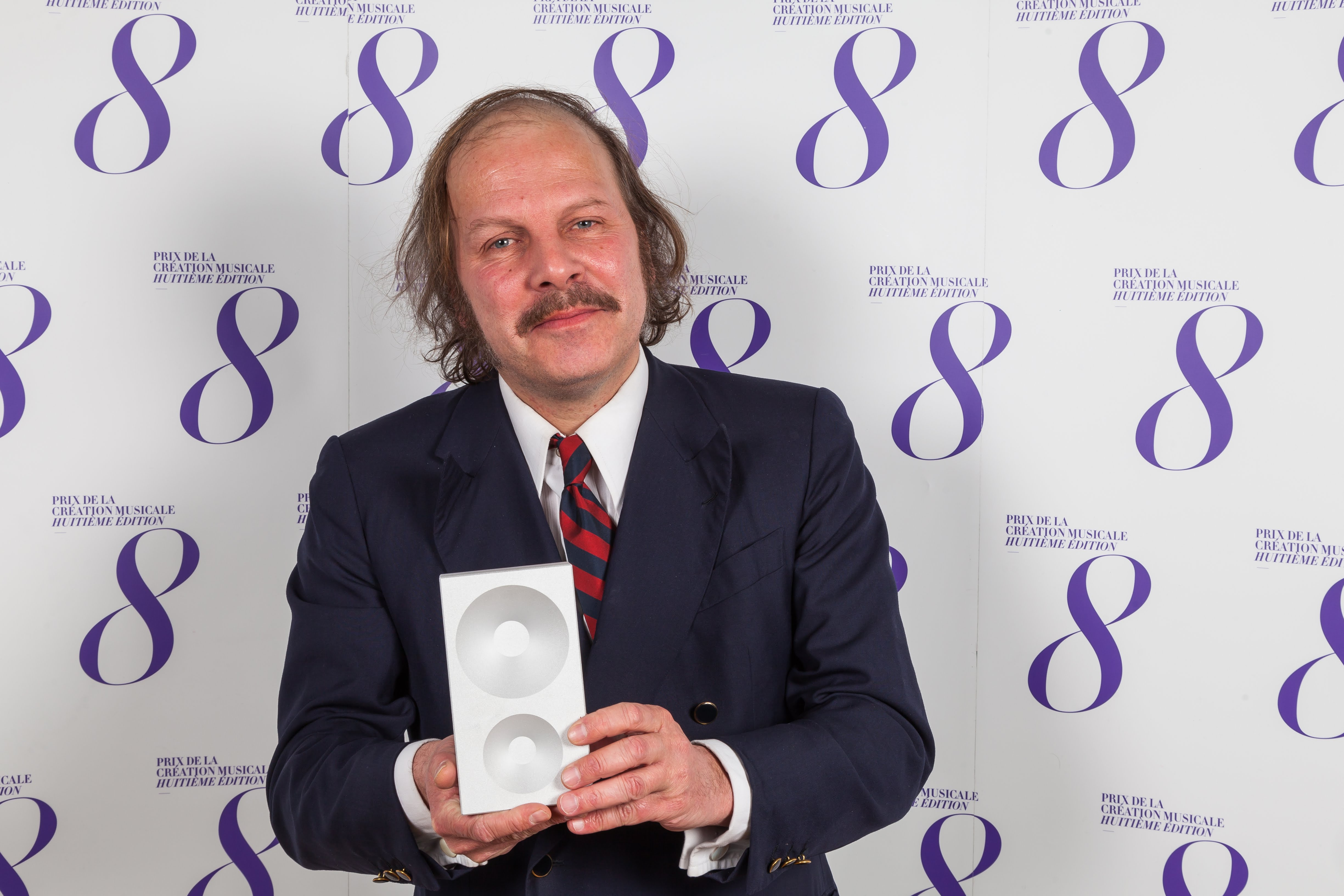
- Katerine in 2018
- Born: Philippe Blanchard; 8 December 1968 (age 57); Thouars, Deux-Sèvres, France
- Occupations: Singer; songwriter; actor; director; writer
- Years active: 1991–present
- Spouse: Helena Noguerra (m. 1999; div. 2008)
- Partner: Julie Depardieu (2010–present)
- Children: 3

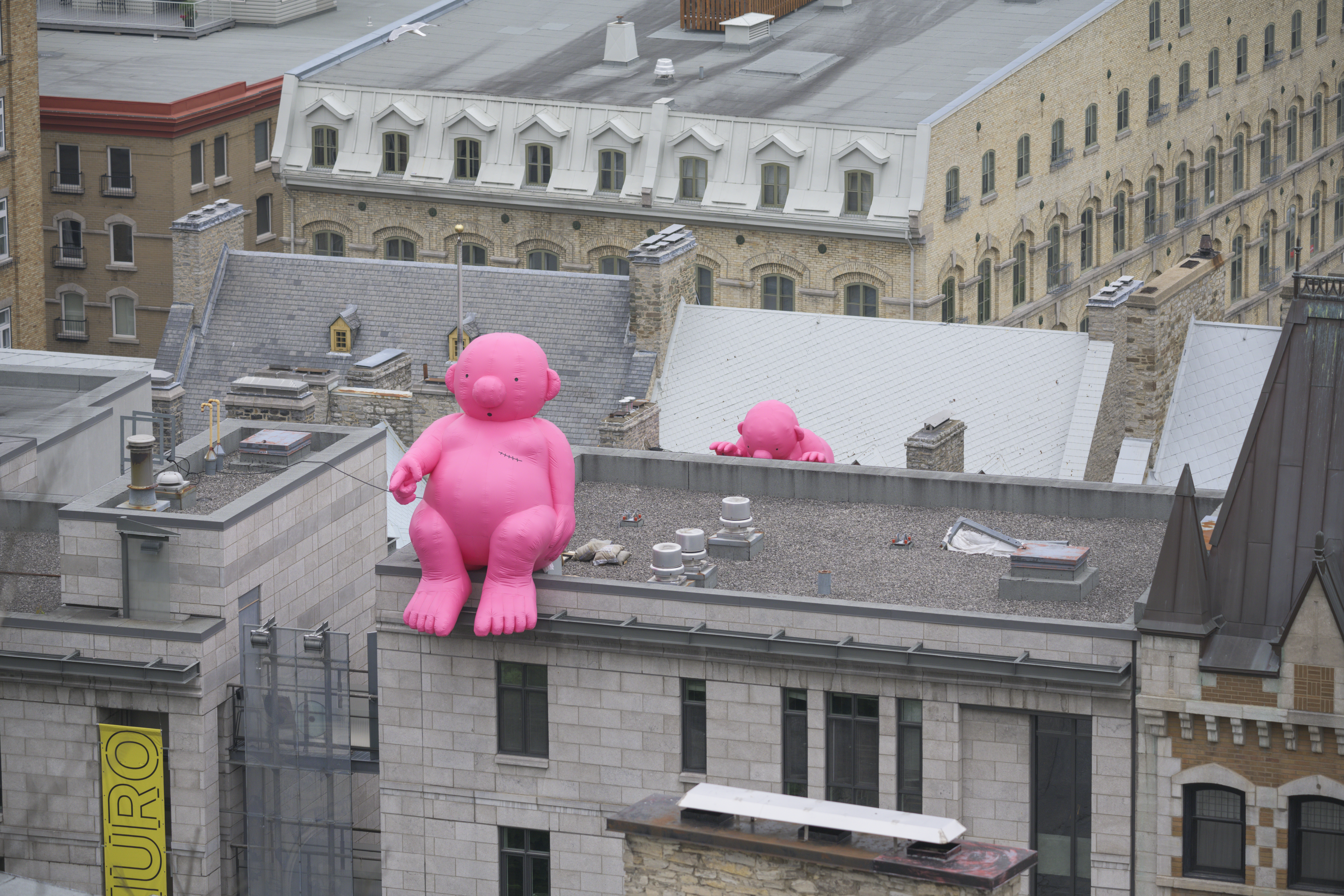
Monsieur Rose placed in Old Quebec

Philippe Blanchard (French pronunciation: [filip blɑ̃ʃaʁ]; born 8 December 1968), known professionally as Philippe Katerine, is a French singer-songwriter, actor, and filmmaker who began his career in 1991. Some of his popular singles include "Mon cœur balance", "Je vous emmerde", and "Louxor j'adore".

At the beginning of his career, his musical style was often described as easy-listening, with bossa nova accents and texts that were often morbid or anguished and tinged with humor, all sometimes interspersed with audio collages. He also incorporated elements of rock and electronic music while remaining rooted in a quirky chanson style. In 2010, he attracted attention as an actor by playing Boris Vian in the biopic Gainsbourg, A Heroic Life, by Joann Sfar. The following year, he got top billing in the offbeat comedy, I am a No Man's Land. In 2015, he played the head of state in Gaz de France.

Besides these films, he was often seen in quirky supporting parts in comedies such as La Tour 2 contrôle infernale (2016), by Éric Judor, Hibou (2016), by Ramzy Bedia, We Are Family (2016), by Gabriel Julien-Laferrière, Le Petit Spirou (2017), by Nicolas Bary, Sink or Swim (2018), by Gilles Lellouche, and The World is Yours (2018), by Romain Gavras.

At the 44th César Awards, he received the César Award for Best Supporting Actor for his performance in Sink or Swim.

In 2022, he founded the artistic movement Le Mignonisme, which was represented by the mascot named Monsieur Rose. Monsieur Rose is an inflatable sculpture that has been featured in temporary exhibitions across various cities around the world.

In 2024, he performed his song Nu semi-naked and painted in blue at the opening ceremony for the Paris Olympic Games.

== Musical career ==
In November 1991, Katerine began his career. In 1992, he released his debut album Les Mariages Chinois (later re-released with an additional track under the title Les Mariages Chinois et la Relecture). Anxious and self-doubting, Katerine in those days mostly composed and record in a home studio.

In 1994, he released the album L’Education Anglaise on which his sister (under the pseudonym Bruno) and his girlfriend Anne did the singing.

In 1995, he worked on his third album and went through a major artistic shift over a year. He began to use other musicians and do his own singing. The album Mes Mauvaises Fréquentations, released in 1996, and offering lusher orchestrations and several vocalists, was well received critically and commercially. He also worked for the first time as musical director on someone else's album, Mercedes Audras' self-titlred debut, released in 1996.

In 1997, he composed an album for two Anglo-Japanese singers, the Winchester Sisters and also participated in a disc where he met the jazz musicians of the group The Recyclers, with whom he collaborated further. He created and recorded two albums at the same time: L’homme à Trois Mains andLes Créatures. The former he recorded at home alone as previously, while the latter was recorded in a more conventional manner in a studio with The Recyclers. The two albums were released together and marked a turning point in his musical career.

He promoted the records extensively in the media and the song “Je Vous Emmerde” got a lot of airplay. The Recyclers with their entirely different musical background fascinated him by their way of working and their relationship to improvisation, which he integrated into his techniques.

In 1999, he composed “Une Histoire d’Amour” for Anna Karina, his favourite actress, with whom he subsequently toured.

== Personal life ==
Katerine has a daughter, Edie, born in 1993, from his marriage to Helena Noguerra (1999–2008). After having had relationships with Jeanne Balibar, he started dating Julie Depardieu with whom he has two sons, Billy, born 16 June 2011, and Alfred, born 8 August 2012.

== Discography ==
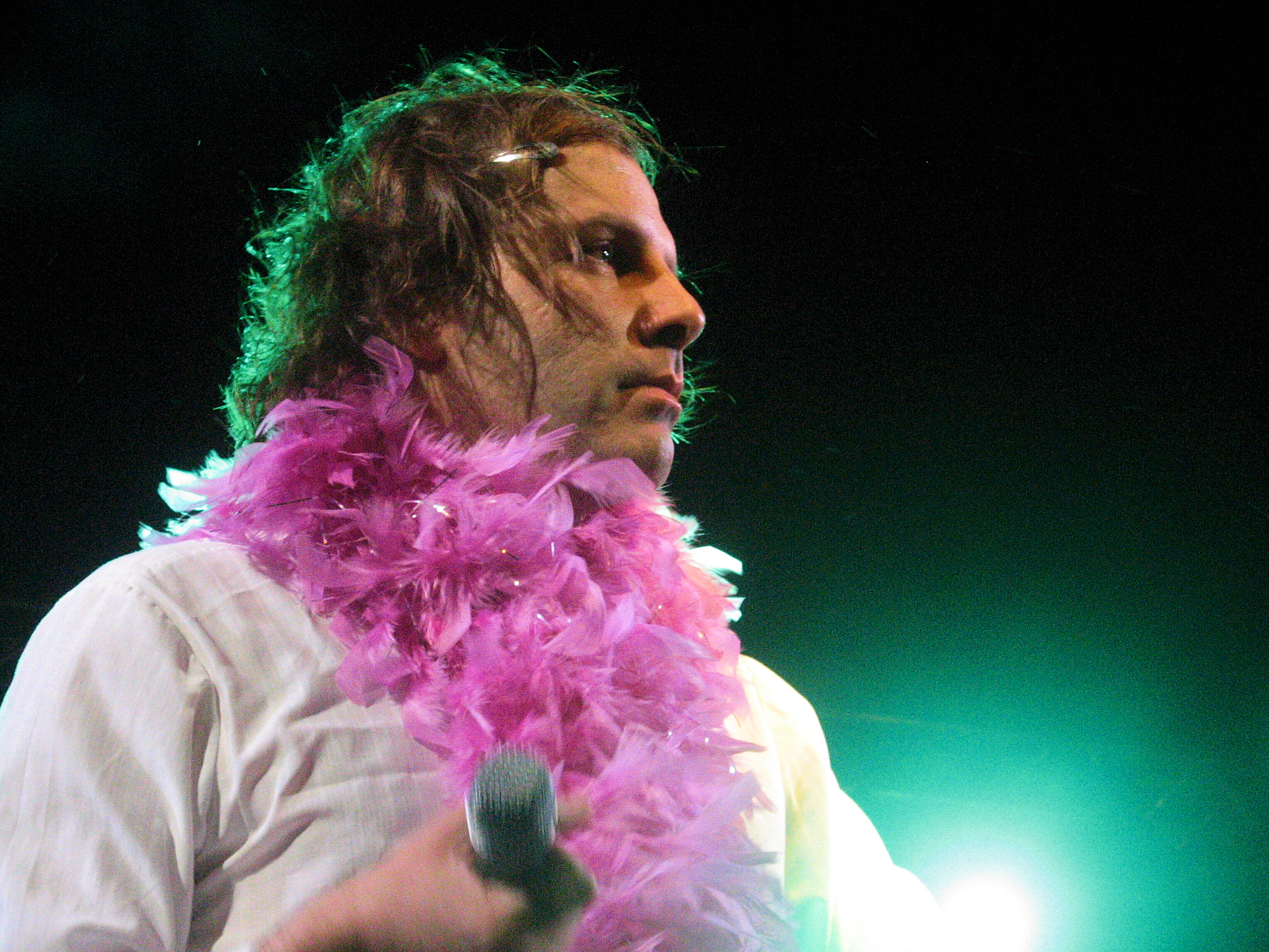
Philippe Katerine, 2006

=== Studio albums ===
- Les mariages chinois (1991)
- Les mariages chinois et la relecture (1993)
- L'éducation anglaise (1994)
- Mes mauvaises fréquentations (1996)
- Les Créatures (1999)
- L'homme à trois mains (1999)
- 8ème ciel (2002)
- Robots après tout (2005)
- Philippe Katerine (2010)
- 52 reprises dans l'espace (2010)
- Magnum (2013)
- Le film (2016)
- Confessions (2019)
- Zouzou (2024)

=== Live albums ===
- Border Live + Studio Live (2007)
- Florilège (2018)

=== Notable singles ===
- "Comme Jeannie Longo" (1993)
- "Un après-midi à Paris" (1994)
- "Le manteau de fourrure" (1995)
- "Entre nous" (1996)
- "Je vous emmerde" (1999)
- "L'homme à 3 mains" (1999)
- "Jésus Christ mon amour" (2000)
- "Des étoiles" (2002)
- "Mort à la poésie" (2003)
- "1 Rue Jacquemot" (2004)
- "Euro 04" (Katerine & Helena Noguerra) (2004)
- "Louxor j'adore" (2006)
- "100% VIP" (2006)
- "78-2008" (2007)
- "Le grand sommeil" (Étienne Daho & Katerine) (2009)
- "Extra Terrestre" (Arielle Dombasle & Katerine) (2009)
- "La banane" (2010)
- "Té-lé-phone" (remixes by Stromae & The Shoes) (2010)
- "Sexy Cool" (2013)
- '"Efféminé" (2014)
- "Moment parfait" (2016)
- "Compliqué" (2016)
- "Y'a d'la rhumba dans l'air" (2017)
- "85 Rouge et noir" (Katerine & MC Circulaire) (2018)
- "Nu" (played at the 2024 Summer Olympics opening ceremony) (2024)

== Filmography ==
=== Actor ===
Year	Title	Role	Director	Notes
2000	Une histoire de K	Philippe	Nicolas Ruffault	Short
2001	Nom de code : Sacha	Himself	Thierry Jousse	Short
2002	The Truth About Charlie	Karina Fan	Jonathan Demme	
2003	Julia et les hommes	The Man	Thierry Jousse	Short
2003	C'était le chien d'Eddy	Laura's friend	Olivier Babinet & Bertrand Mandico	Short
2005	To Paint or Make Love	Mathieu	Arnaud Larrieu & Jean-Marie Larrieu	
2005	Peau de cochon	Himself	Philippe Katerine	
2005	Les invisibles	The sound engineer	Thierry Jousse	
2008	Louise Hires a Contract Killer	The singer	Gustave Kervern & Benoît Delépine	
2008	Le voyage aux Pyrénées	A brother	Arnaud Larrieu & Jean-Marie Larrieu	
2008	Capitaine Achab	Henry	Philippe Ramos	
2009	Les regrets	Franck	Cédric Kahn	
2010	Gainsbourg: A Heroic Life	Boris Vian	Joann Sfar	
2011	Je suis un no man's land	Philippe	Thierry Jousse	
2013	Opium	Nijinski	Arielle Dombasle	
2014	Magnum	Himself	Gaëtan Chataignier & Philippe Katerine	TV movie
2015	April and the Extraordinary World	Darwin	Christian Desmares & Franck Ekinci	
2016	La Tour 2 contrôle infernale	Colonel Janouniou	Éric Judor	
2016	We Are Family	Claude	Gabriel Julien-Laferrière	
2016	Hibou	Francis Banane	Ramzy Bedia	
2016	Gaz de France	Jean-Michel Gambier	Benoît Forgeard	
2017	Let the Sunshine In	Mathieu	Claire Denis	
2017	Le petit Spirou	Langélusse	Nicolas Bary	
2018	Sink or Swim	Thierry	Gilles Lellouche	César Award for Best Supporting Actor; Globe de Cristal Award - Best Actor - Comedy
2018	The World Is Yours	Vincent	Romain Gavras	
2018	Le poulain	Daniel Juval-Thibault	Mathieu Sapin	
2018	Puzzle	Destructor	Olivier Pairoux	Short
2019	Notre dame	Martin Guénaud	Valérie Donzelli	
2019	All About Yves	Dimitri	Benoît Forgeard	
2019	C'est quoi cette mamie?!	Claude	Gabriel Julien-Laferrière	
2019	Amor maman	Oliver	Roland Menou	Short
2019	Mike	Himself	Frédéric Hazan	TV series (2 episodes)
2020	Le Lion	Romain Martin	Ludovic Colbeau-Justin	
2020	Merveilles à Montfermeil	Franceschini	Jeanne Balibar	
2021	Le test	Laurent Castillon	Emmanuel Poulain-Arnaud	
2021	La pièce rapportée	Paul Château-Têtard	Antonin Peretjatko	
2021	C'est quoi ce papy?!	Claude	Gabriel Julien-Laferrière	
2021	Last Journey of Paul W.R.	The radio host	Romain Quirot	
2021	Neuf meufs, L'unitaire	Michel	Emma de Caunes	TV movie
2022	Petite Solange	Antoine Maserati	Axelle Ropert	
2022	Neuf mecs	Michel	Emma de Caunes	TV mini-series
2023	Wingwomen	Abner	Mélanie Laurent	
2023	Voyages en Italie	Jean-Philippe	Sophie Letourneur	
2023	Un homme heureux	Francis	Tristan Séguéla	
2023	La plus belle pour aller danser	Vincent Bison	Victoria Bedos	
2023	Asterix & Obelix: The Middle Kingdom	Cacofonix	Guillaume Canet	
2025	The Incredible Snow Woman	Basil	Sébastien Betbeder	It will be screened in Panorama at the 75th Berlin International Film Festival in February 2025.
2025	L'aventura	Jean-Philippe	Sophie Letourneur	

=== Director/Writer ===
Year	Title	Notes
2003	1 km à pied	Short
2005	Peau de cochon	
2014	Magnum	TV movie

=== Composer ===
Year	Title	Notes
2000	Une histoire de K	Short
2001	Histoires de bonsaï	Short
2001	Nom de code: Sacha	Short
2003	A Man, a Real One	
2005	To Paint or Make Love	
2008	Victoria	
2011	Je suis un no man's land	
