= Fillières (surname) =

Fillières is a French surname. Notable people with the surname include:

- Hélène Fillières (born 1972), French actress, film director and screenwriter
- Sophie Fillières (born 1964), French film director and screenwriter
