= Secret Name =

Secret Name may refer to:

- Secret Name (album), 1999 album by Low
- Secret Name (film), 2021 French film
