= The Man I Love =

The Man I Love may refer to:

- "The Man I Love" (song), a popular song by George Gershwin, from the musical Lady Be Good
- The Man I Love (album), a 1957 album by Peggy Lee
- The Man I Love (1929 film), directed by William A. Wellman
- The Man I Love (1947 film), directed by Raoul Walsh
- The Man I Love (1997 film)
- The Man I Love (2026 film), directed by Ira Sachs
- The Man I Love (ballet), a 2009 ballet made by Susan Stroman on New York City Ballet

== See also ==
- The Men I Love, a tribute album by Amii Stewart released in 1995
