= Aunt Hilda =

Aunt Hilda may refer to:

- Aunt Hilda!, a 2013 French animated film
- Hilda Spellman, an Archie comics character
