= Raising Colors =

- French: Volontaire
- Directed by: Hélène Fillières
- Written by: Hélène Fillières; Mathias Gavarry
- Produced by: Matthieu Tarot
- Starring: Diane Rouxel; Lambert Wilson
- Cinematography: Eric Dumont
- Edited by: Yves Deschamps
- Music by: Bruno Coulais
- Production company: Albertine Productions
- Distributed by: Gaumont
- Release date: 6 June 2018 (France)
- Running time: 101 minutes
- Country: France
- Language: French
- Budget: $5.1 million
- Box office: $1 million

Raising Colors (French: Volontaire) is a French drama directed by Hélène Fillières, who also co-wrote the film and plays a naval commander.

== Plot ==
After studying to become a Russian and an English linguist, Laure joins the Marine Fusiliers as a protocol officer. She is assigned to work for a Naval Commando officer that inspires her to earn her own green beret as a member of the Commando Ponchardier support unit.

== Cast ==
- Diane Rouxel as Laure Baer
- Lambert Wilson as Commandant Rivière
- Alex Descas as Albertini
- Corentin Fila as Loïc Dumont
- Josiane Balasko as Muriel Baer
- André Marcon as Monsieur Baer
- Igor Kovalsky as Marchaudon
- Jonathan Couzinié as Philippe
- Hélène Fillières as Weber
- Marc Fraize as Desmarest
- Pauline Acquart as Attab

== Production ==
Principal photography on the film began on May 11, 2017 in Bretagne. The shooting lasted 7 weeks and ended in July 2017.
