= Heat Wave (2015 film) =

- Film poster
- Directed by: Raphaël Jacoulot
- Written by: Raphaël Jacoulot; Lise Macheboeuf; Florence Vignon (script consultant)
- Produced by: Miléna Poylo; Gilles Sacuto; Jacques-Henri Bronckart; Olivier Bronckart
- Starring: Jean-Pierre Darroussin; Grégory Gadebois; Karim Leklou; Carole Franck
- Cinematography: Benoît Chamaillard
- Edited by: François Quiqueré
- Music by: André Dziezuk
- Production company: TS Productions
- Distributed by: Diaphana Films
- Release date: 12 August 2015
- Running time: 102 minutes
- Countries: France; Belgium
- Language: French
- Budget: $4.1 million

Heat Wave (original title: Coup de chaud) is a 2015 French thriller-drama film directed by Raphaël Jacoulot. It was released on 12 August 2015.

== Cast ==
- Jean-Pierre Darroussin as Daniel Huot-Marchand
- Grégory Gadebois as Rodolphe Blin
- Karim Leklou as Josef Bousou
- Carole Franck as Diane
- Isabelle Sadoyan as Odette
- Serra Yılmaz as Josiane Bousou
- Camille Figuereo as Bénédicte Blin
- Agathe Dronne as Valérie
- Patrick Bonnel as Jean-Louis Boibessot
- Marc Bodnar as Michel
