= Hidden Diary =

2009 film by Julie Lopes-Curval

- Film poster
- Directed by: Julie Lopes-Curval
- Written by: Sophie Hiet; Julie Lopes-Curval
- Produced by: Alain Benguigui; Thomas Verhaeghe
- Starring: Catherine Deneuve; Marina Hands; Marie-Josée Croze
- Cinematography: Philippe Guilbert
- Edited by: Anne Weil
- Music by: Patrick Watson
- Production companies: Sombrero Films; France 3 Cinéma
- Distributed by: BAC Films
- Release dates: August 2009 (Montreal); 7 October 2009 (France)
- Running time: 105 minutes
- Countries: France; Canada
- Language: French
- Budget: $3.4 million
- Box office: $3 million

Hidden Diary (also titled Mères et filles and La Cuisine) is a 2009 Franco-Canadian drama film directed by Julie Lopes-Curval. The film tells the story of three generations of women, starring Catherine Deneuve, Marina Hands and Marie-Josée Croze.

== Cast ==
- Catherine Deneuve as Martine
- Marina Hands as Audrey
- Marie-Josée Croze as Louise
- Michel Duchaussoy as Michel
- Carole Franck as Evelyne
- Jean-Philippe Écoffey as Gérard
- Éléonore Hirt as Suzanne
- Gérard Watkins as Gilles
- Romano Orzari as Tom
- Nans Laborde as Pierre
- Meriem Serbah as Samira
- Louison Bergman as the young Martine
- Arthur Lurcin as the young Gérard
- Manon Percept as the young Audrey
