= Season's Beatings =

- Film poster
- Directed by: Danièle Thompson
- Written by: Christopher Thompson; Danièle Thompson
- Produced by: Alain Sarde
- Starring: Sabine Azéma; Emmanuelle Béart; Charlotte Gainsbourg; Claude Rich; Françoise Fabian
- Cinematography: Robert Fraisse
- Edited by: Emmanuelle Castro
- Music by: Michel Legrand
- Production companies: Les Films Alain Sarde; Studio Images 6 Le Studio Canal+ TF1 Films Productions
- Distributed by: Pathé Distribution
- Release date: 24 November 1999
- Country: France
- Languages: French; English; Russian
- Budget: $8.4 million
- Box office: $22.7 million

Season's Beatings (French: La Bûche) is a French comedy-drama film directed by Danièle Thompson, released in 1999.

== Plot ==
Following the recent death of her second husband, for Christmas, Yvette tries to meet the three daughters from her first marriage with Stanislas, the gypsy violinist, again. During the preparations, questions and revelations are well underway from Louba, the artist, Sonia, the middle child and Milla, the rebel.

Yvette and Stanislas' daughters dreaded celebrating Christmas festivities because it coincides with the couple's 25th wedding anniversary. Ever since Yvette's divorce from Stanislas, and her remarriage, the siblings have had a strained relationship with their mother.

Yvette and her daughters had an emotional reunion and reconciliation following the tragedy that took the life of her second husband.

== Cast ==
- Sabine Azéma as Louba
- Emmanuelle Béart as Sonia
- Charlotte Gainsbourg as Milla
- Claude Rich as Stanislas
- Françoise Fabian as Yvette
- Jean-Pierre Darroussin as Gilbert
- Isabelle Carré as Annabelle
- Samuel Labarthe as Pierre
- Françoise Brion as Janine
- Christopher Thompson as Joseph
- Hélène Fillières as Véronique
- Marie de Villepin as Marie

== Critical response ==
On Metacritic the film has a score of 66 out of 100, based on 15 critics, indicating "generally favorable reviews".

== Accolades ==
Award / Film Festival	Category	Recipients and nominees	Result
César Awards	Best Supporting Actor	Claude Rich	Nominated
César Awards	Best Supporting Actress	Charlotte Gainsbourg	Won
César Awards	Best Original Screenplay or Adaptation	Christopher Thompson and Danièle Thompson	Nominated
César Awards	Best First Feature Film		Nominated
Lumière Awards	Best Screenplay	Christopher Thompson and Danièle Thompson	Won

== See also ==
- List of Christmas films
