= Toi et moi (film) =

- Film poster
- Directed by: Julie Lopes-Curval
- Written by: Sophie Hiet; Julie Lopes-Curval
- Produced by: Alain Benguigui
- Starring: Marion Cotillard; Julie Depardieu; Jonathan Zaccaï
- Cinematography: Philippe Guilbert
- Edited by: Anne Weil
- Music by: Sébastien Schuller
- Production company: Sombrero Productions
- Distributed by: Pyramide Distribution
- Release date: 8 March 2006 (France)
- Running time: 90 minutes
- Country: France
- Language: French

Toi et moi is a 2006 French romantic comedy-drama film directed by Julie Lopes-Curval. The film stars Marion Cotillard, Julie Depardieu and Jonathan Zaccaï.

== Cast ==
- Marion Cotillard as Lena
- Julie Depardieu as Ariane
- Tomer Sisley as Farid
- Éric Berger as François
- Jonathan Zaccaï as Mark Bajik
- Chantal Lauby as Éléonore
- Carole Franck as Sandrine
- Sergio Peris-Mencheta as Pablo
- Philippe Le Fèvre as Jérémie
- Sabine Balasse as Corinne
