= A Man, a Real One =

- Film poster
- Directed by: Arnaud Larrieu; Jean-Marie Larrieu
- Written by: Sophie Fillières; Arnaud Larrieu; Jean-Marie Larrieu
- Produced by: Philippe Martin
- Starring: Mathieu Amalric; Hélène Fillières; Denis Podalydès
- Cinematography: Christophe Beaucarne
- Music by: Philippe Katerine
- Distributed by: Haut et Court
- Release date: 28 May 2003
- Running time: 120 minutes
- Country: France
- Language: French
- Budget: $3.5 million
- Box office: $480,000

A Man, a Real One (French title: Un homme, un vrai) is a 2003 French comedy-drama film directed by Arnaud and Jean-Marie Larrieu.

== Plot ==
Boris, an apprentice film director, meets Marilyne, a young senior executive, during an evening in Paris and they declare their love for one another, despite their barely knowing each other. Five years later, during a business trip to the Balearic Islands, with Boris and their children, Marilyne runs away at the very moment when Boris is going to leave her. Five years down the road, Marilyne reappears at the other end of the Pyrenees mountains, with a group of Americans. The man who will be their guide is none other than Boris, who is unrecognisable.

== Cast ==
- Mathieu Amalric as Boris
- Hélène Fillières as Marilyne
- Denis Podalydès as Madeleine
- Pierre Pellet as Toni
- Philippe Suner as Jean-Claude
- Eva Ionesco as assistant producer
