= Boomerang (2015 film) =

- Theatrical release poster
- Directed by: François Favrat
- Screenplay by: François Favrat; Emmanuel Courcol
- Based on: A Secret Kept (Boomerang) by Tatiana de Rosnay
- Produced by: François Kraus; Denis Pineau-Valencienne
- Starring: Laurent Lafitte; Mélanie Laurent; Audrey Dana; Wladimir Yordanoff
- Cinematography: Laurent Brunet
- Edited by: Valérie Deseine
- Music by: Éric Neveux
- Production companies: Les Films du Kiosque; France 2 Cinéma; TF1 Droits Audiovisuels; UGC Images
- Distributed by: UGC Distribution
- Release dates: 26 August 2015 (Angoulême); 23 September 2015
- Running time: 105 minutes
- Country: France
- Language: French
- Budget: $4 million
- Box office: $2.2 million

Boomerang is a 2015 French drama film directed by François Favrat and starring Laurent Lafitte, Mélanie Laurent, Audrey Dana and Wladimir Yordanoff. It is an adaptation of Tatiana de Rosnay's novel A Secret Kept (alternative title:Boomerang). The film was released in theatres on 23 September 2015.

== Plot ==
Supported by his new partner, a man in his late forties questions the exact circumstances of his mother's death, 30 years earlier on the island of Noirmoutier, and conducts his investigation, coming up against the silence and aggression of his father and the hostility of his younger sister, who is keen to maintain peace in the family.

== Cast ==
- Laurent Lafitte as Antoine Rey
- Mélanie Laurent as Agathe Rey
- Audrey Dana as Angèle
- Wladimir Yordanoff as Charles Rey
- Bulle Ogier as Blanche Rey
- Anne Suarez as Astrid
- Anne Loiret as Anne-Sophie
- Lise Lamétrie as Bernadette
- Angèle Garnier as Margaux
- Kate Moran as Jean
- Gabrielle Atger as Clarisse
- Rose Favrat as Rose
- Lou-Ann Opéron as Pauline
- Eriq Ebouaney as The psychiatrist
