= Venus Beauty Institute =

1999 film by Tonie Marshall

- Theatrical release poster
- French: Vénus beauté (institut)
- Directed by: Tonie Marshall
- Written by: Tonie Marshall; Jacques Audiard; Marion Vernoux
- Produced by: Gilles Sandoz
- Starring: Nathalie Baye; Bulle Ogier; Samuel Le Bihan; Jacques Bonnaffé; Mathilde Seigner; Audrey Tautou; Claire Nebout; Micheline Presle; Emmanuelle Riva; Robert Hossein
- Cinematography: Gérard de Battista
- Edited by: Jacques Comets
- Music by: Khalil Chahine
- Production companies: Agat Films & Cie; Arte France Cinéma; Tabo Tabo Films
- Distributed by: Pyramide Distribution
- Release date: 3 February 1999
- Running time: 105 minutes
- Country: France
- Language: French
- Budget: €2.8 million
- Box office: $7.4 million

Venus Beauty Institute (French: Vénus beauté (institut)), also known as Venus Beauty, is a 1999 French romantic comedy film written and directed by Tonie Marshall. It stars Nathalie Baye, Bulle Ogier, Samuel Le Bihan, Jacques Bonnaffé, Mathilde Seigner, Audrey Tautou, Claire Denis, Micheline Presle, Emmanuelle Riva and Robert Hossein. The story centers on three employees of a beauty parlor and their search for love and happiness.

The film received seven nominations at the 25th César Awards, winning for Best Film, Best Director, Best Original Screenplay or Adaptation and Most Promising Actress (Tautou).

== Plot ==
Angèle is a 40-year-old beautician who works at the title establishment in Paris. She has been an orphan from the age of eight, her father having killed her mother for suspected infidelity, and then killing himself when her infidelity was proved untrue. She picks up men to have short sex flings, but no longer believes in love, having hurt her former boyfriend, Jacques, whom she occasionally contacts out of loneliness, but who is never available at the same time as her. An unkempt younger man, Antoine, sees her at a café as she is being dumped by her latest fling, and falls in love with her. He stands outside the beauty shop to watch for Angèle, follows her to a café and declares his love for her, but she for once is lost for words and does not immediately return his feelings. Antoine also reveals that despite his feelings for her, he is engaged, but feels he is drifting away from his fiancée. Despite her declared refusal to believe in love, Angèle gradually falls for Antoine.

Venus Beauty Institute is run by Nadine, and Angèle's co-workers include Samantha, who has a string of dates and gives Angèle their descriptions, and Marie, the youngest who is still learning the ropes. The co-workers' love lives contrast with Angèle's. Marie has as her client an aging pilot, who had been burnt and had his face reconstructed from his late wife's skin. The pilot wants Marie to come to his house, which she eventually does, watched by Angèle and Antoine. Angèle is concerned that Marie is too naïve and that the pilot invited her to his house to seduce her. As Marie and the pilot begin to make love, Angèle and Antoine start kissing.

Christmas is approaching, and Angèle goes to her aunts in Poitiers. Antoine had revealed that he is a sculptor, and had been commissioned to do an altarpiece for the cathedral there. She goes to the cathedral to see the artwork but changes her mind when an old friend recognizes her. Returning to Paris, Angèle goes to the hospital to visit Samantha, who had tried to commit suicide out of loneliness over Christmas. Samantha reveals that Nadine is starting a new store and that she found a new girl to temporarily replace Samantha. However, the new girl, Evelyne, turns out to be a disaster, wanting to arrange the products by color rather than function, and eventually quits.

Meanwhile, Antoine's fiancée had followed him and saw him leave the store with Angèle. She goes to the store as a client and confides to Angèle that her fiancé is seeing someone else, but she thinks he still loves her. Later, when Antoine takes Angèle shopping, Antoine's fiancée comes into the store; Angèle sees them together and thinks Antoine has betrayed her. She phones Antoine to call their relationship off. To make amends, as Angèle is left to close the store on New Year's Eve, Antoine comes to the store with a present. It is a new dress. Antoine's fiancée sees this and comes into the store with a gun, but when she fires, all she succeeds in hitting is the lights. As the sparks fly, Antoine and Angèle kiss each other.

== Cast ==
- Nathalie Baye as Angèle
- Audrey Tautou as Marie
- Mathilde Seigner as Samantha
- Samuel Le Bihan as Antoine
- Bulle Ogier as Nadine
- Jacques Bonnaffé as Jacques
- Robert Hossein as The Pilot
- Micheline Presle as Aunt Maryse
- Emmanuelle Riva as Aunt Lyda
- Édith Scob as The stained woman
- Claire Nebout as The exhibitionist
- Catherine Hosmalin as A client
- Liliane Rovère as A client
- Claude Jade as The lesbian
- Brigitte Roüan as The depressive
- Claire Denis as The asthmatic
- Marie Rivière as The client with fur lined boots
- Hélène Fillières as Antoine's fiancée
- Elli Medeiros as Evelyne
- Romain Goupil as Dr. Fremond

== Reception ==
Benefiting from glowing reviews and positive word-of-mouth from audiences, Venus Beauty Institute emerged as the surprise hit of the 1999 film year with nearly 1.4 million admissions. The film was the big winner at the 25th César Awards ceremony in 2000, dethroning the two favorites of the evening: Luc Besson's Joan of Arc and Patrice Leconte's The Girl on the Bridge. Tonie Marshall was the first woman to be awarded the César for Best Director; she would be joined by Justine Triet for Anatomy of a Fall in 2024.

On the review aggregator website Rotten Tomatoes, 59% of 27 critics' reviews are positive. Metacritic, which uses a weighted average, assigned the film a score of 64 out of 100, based on 19 critics, indicating "generally favorable" reviews.
