= A Hell of a Day =

2001 film by Marion Vernoux

- Directed by: Marion Vernoux
- Written by: Marion Vernoux; Nathalie Kristy
- Produced by: Alain Rozanès; Pascal Verroust
- Starring: Karin Viard; Hélène Fillières; Victor Lanoux; Jane Birkin; Sergi López; Clémentine Célarié; Gilbert Melki; Melvil Poupaud
- Cinematography: Dominique Colin
- Edited by: Lise Beaulieu
- Music by: Alexandre Desplat
- Production company: ADR Productions
- Distributed by: Pyramide Distribution
- Release date: 24 October 2001
- Running time: 96 minutes
- Country: France
- Language: French
- Budget: $4.8 million
- Box office: $1.3 million

A Hell of a Day (original title: Reines d'un jour) is a 2001 French comedy film directed by Marion Vernoux.

== Cast ==
- Karin Viard : Hortense Lassalle
- Hélène Fillières : Marie Larue
- Victor Lanoux : Maurice Degombert
- Jane Birkin : Jane
- Sergi López : Luis Del Sol
- Clémentine Célarié : Michèle
- Gilbert Melki : Shermann
- Melvil Poupaud : Ben
- Jonathan Zaccaï : Pierre
- Valérie Benguigui : Stéphanie
- Philippe Harel : Antoine Lassalle
- Evelyne Buyle : Evelyne
- Joseph Malerba : Marco
- Michèle Moretti : The bus passenger
- Catherine Hosmalin : The cockroaches woman

== Accolades ==
Year	Award	Category	Recipient	Result
2002	27th César Awards	Most Promising Actress	Hélène Fillières	Nominated
