= Maud Wyler =

French actress (born 1982)

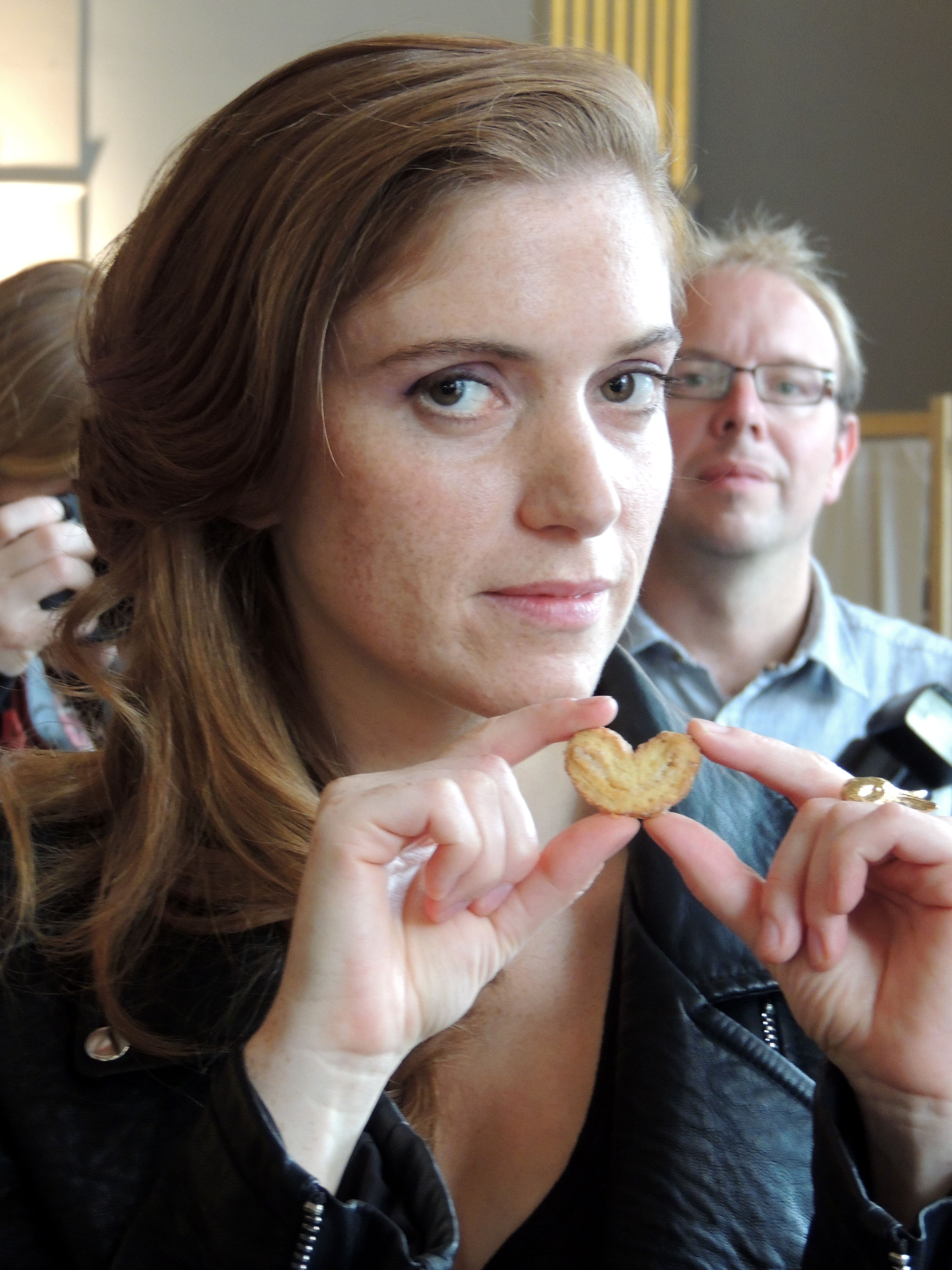
- Maud Wyler at the FIFF of Namur in September 2013
- Born: 14 December 1982 (age 43); France
- Education: Conservatoire national supérieur d'art dramatique (CNSAD)
- Occupation: Actress
- Years active: 2009-present

Maud Wyler (born 14 December 1982) is a French actress. She appeared in more than thirty films since 2009.

== Selected filmography ==
Year	Title	Role	Notes
2009	High Lane	Karine	
2010	Roses à crédit	Cecile	
2011	Louise Wimmer	Jessica Wimmer	
2012	Blood from a Stone	Jessica	
2014	2 Autumns, 3 Winters	Amélie	
2019	Perdrix	Juliette Webb	
2019	Alice and the Mayor	Delphine Bérard	
2021	Voltaire High	Jeanne Bellanger	TV series
2021	Secret Name La place d’un autre	Rose Juillet	
2022	Irma Vep	Rebekah	TV series
2023	Bernadette	Laurence Chirac	Biographical film
