= To Paint or Make Love =

- Film poster
- Directed by: Arnaud Larrieu; Jean-Marie Larrieu
- Written by: Arnaud Larrieu; Jean-Marie Larrieu
- Produced by: Philippe Martin
- Starring: Sabine Azéma; Daniel Auteuil; Amira Casar
- Cinematography: Christophe Beaucarne
- Music by: Philippe Katerine
- Distributed by: Pyramide Distribution
- Release dates: 18 May 2005 (Cannes); 24 August 2005 (France)
- Running time: 100 minutes
- Country: France
- Language: French
- Budget: $4.8 million
- Box office: $4.9 million

To Paint or Make Love (French: Peindre ou faire l'amour) is a 2005 French film directed by Arnaud and Jean-Marie Larrieu.

The film was nominated for the Palme d'Or at the 2005 Cannes Film Festival.

== Plot ==
The story is about a middle-aged couple, Madeleine and William who enjoy a comfortable, orderly life. They buy a house in a scenic rural setting and this changes their lives forever. They come across a younger pair, Adam and Eva, and the couples become attracted to each other. Their love results in an exploration of erotic desires and art in the idyllic French Alps.

As this unexpected journey begins, Madeleine and William try to comprehend what is happening in their lives and the swingers' lifestyle that they have fallen into. After a time. they find that the sexual interactions are both interesting and addictive.

When Adam and Eva leave France, Madeleine and William become unsettled and decide to sell their home and join Adam and Eva on a Pacific island. The house-for-sale advertisement attracts some interested couples to a house inspection when another couple emerges. Madeleine and William invite them to stay for dinner, which turns into an erotic adventure as it had with Adam and Eva.

Suddenly, Madeleine and William understand that they need not go to the Pacific for the lifestyle as they can find romantic interactions in their current settings. Their realization between is dramatic.

== Cast ==
- Sabine Azéma as Madeleine
- Daniel Auteuil as William
- Amira Casar as Eva
- Sergi López as Adam
- Philippe Katerine as Mathieu
- Florence Loiret Caille as Élise
