= Seaside (film) =

- Film poster
- Directed by: Julie Lopes-Curval
- Written by: François Favrat; Julie Lopes-Curval
- Produced by: Alain Benguigui
- Starring: Bulle Ogier; Ludmila Mikaël; Hélène Fillières; Jonathan Zaccaï
- Cinematography: Stephan Massis
- Edited by: Anne Weil
- Music by: Christophe Chevalier; Nicolas Gerber
- Production companies: Canal+ CNC; Procirep
- Distributed by: Pyramide Distribution
- Release dates: May 2002 (Cannes); 4 December 2002 (France)
- Running time: 90 minutes
- Country: France
- Language: French

Seaside (French: Bord de mer) is a 2002 French drama film written and directed by Julie Lopes-Curval. It was screened in the Directors' Fortnight section at the 2002 Cannes Film Festival where it won the Caméra d'Or.

== Cast ==
- Bulle Ogier as Rose
- Ludmila Mikaël as Anne
- Hélène Fillières as Marie
- Jonathan Zaccaï as Paul
- Liliane Rovère as Odette
- Patrick Lizana as Albert
- Emmanuelle Lepoutre as Albertine
- Fabien Orcier as Jacquot
- Jauris Casanova as Pierre
- Audrey Bonnet as Lilas
- Jean-Michel Noirey as Robert
- Jacqueline Carpentier as Denise
- Alexandra Mercouroff as Lucille
