= The Man I Love (1997 film) =

1997 French television film

- French: L'Homme que j'aime
- Written by: Stéphane Giusti
- Directed by: Stéphane Giusti
- Starring: Jean-Michel Portal; Marcial Di Fonzo Bo; Mathilde Seigner; Vittoria Scognamiglio
- Music by: Lazare Boghossian
- Country of origin: France
- Original language: French

Production
- Producers: Michel Rivelin; Alain Tortevoix
- Cinematography: Jacques Bouquin
- Editor: Catherine Schwartz
- Running time: 91 minutes

Original release
- Release: 5 December 1997

The Man I Love (French: L'Homme que j'aime) is a 1997 French gay romance television film directed by Stéphane Giusti. It was originally made for French television, a production of La Sept Arte. It was broadcast in 1997. It was then released internationally as a film on 27 April 2001.

== Plot ==
It follows a love story between two men at a swimming pool. Martin (Marcial Di Fonzo Bo), a brash pool monitor and resident lifeguard meets Lucas (Jean-Michel Portal). Martin becomes interested in the younger and attractive Lucas, but Lucas has a live-in girlfriend, Lise (Mathilde Seigner), so he initially resisted. Later, Lise starts to integrate Martin into Lucas and Lise's social life. Lucas then begins to doubt his heterosexuality and starts falling for Martin. But Martin is declared HIV-positive, which forces Lucas to choose between the terminally ill man he starts to love and his first love Lise. The motto "Live each day of your life as if it were your last" is the main theme of the film.

== Cast ==
- Jean-Michel Portal as Lucas
- Marcial Di Fonzo Bo as Martin
- Mathilde Seigner as Lise
- Vittoria Scognamiglio as Rose

Other cast members; Jacques Hansen, Stephane Leveque, Karim Lounis, Bernard Nissile, Bruno Bonomo, Benjamin Sanchiarelli, Serguei Tourountsev, Nedjib Djebarri, Louis Philippe Lopez and Elizabeth Giusti

== DVD release ==
The Man I Love was released on Region 1 (U.S. and Canada) DVD on 11 November 2003.
