= Agnès Berthon =

French actress (1959–2025)

- Born: 23 June 1959; Algiers, French Algeria
- Died: 17 August 2025 (aged 66)
- Occupation: Actress

Agnès Berthon (23 June 1959 – 17 August 2025) was a French actress.

== Life and career ==
Born in Algiers on 23 June 1959, Berthon grew up in Nice in a family passionate about American theater. At the age of six, she was influenced by Louis Jouvet's role in The Curtain Rises. She also listened to the likes of Elvis Presley, The Beatles, and The Animals on her family's 45 rpm records. She took the entrance exam for the Conservatoire national supérieur d'art dramatique, but was rejected by director Robert Manuel and ultimately did not gain admission into the conservatory, despite receiving praise from Claude Régy. She then joined the Théâtre Paris-Villette and appeared in a production of La Dispute by Pierre de Marivaux. In the early 1990s, she was in a relationship with the singer Miossec, who dedicated his album Boire to their breakup. By 1997, she had not appeared in any theatrical productions or films for several years, but her introduction to Joël Pommerat, who cast her in the play Treize étroites têtes. Pommerat praised her for her "intensity" in the role.

Berthon continued her career in cinema, playing roles in films directed by Bertrand Mandico, Arnaud des Pallières, and Yann Gonzalez. In the 2010s, she lived in Sète.

Berthon died of lung cancer on 17 August 2025, at the age of 66.

== Filmography ==
- Deux ramoneurs chez une cantatrice (1992)
- Notre-Dame des Hormones (2015)
- Cantate/Macabre (2016)
- John Marr (2016)
- Knife+Heart (2018)
- A Double Caprice at the Asylum (2019)
- La nuit m'appelle (2020)
- Kraken (2022)
- Captives (2023)
- Stereo Girls (2025)
