= Stereo Girls =

2025 drama film

- French: Les immortelles
- Directed by: Caroline Deruas
- Written by: Caroline Deruas; Jihane Chouaib; Maud Ameline; Victoria Kaario
- Produced by: Laurine Pelassy; Eduardo Sosa Soria
- Starring: Lena Garrel; Louiza Aura; Emmanuelle Béart
- Cinematography: Vincent Biron
- Edited by: Mirenda Ouellet
- Music by: Calypso Valois
- Production companies: Les Films de la Capitaine; La Féline Films; Possibles Media
- Release date: 28 August 2025 (Venice)
- Running time: 89 minutes
- Countries: France; Canada
- Language: French

Stereo Girls (French: Les immortelles, lit. 'The Immortals') is a 2025 coming-of-age drama film co-written and directed by Caroline Deruas.

A co-production between France and Canada, the film had its world premiere at the 82nd Venice International Film Festival.

== Cast ==
- Lena Garrel as Charlotte
- Louiza Aura as Liza
- Emmanuelle Béart as Michèle
- Vahina Giocante as Sylviane
- Aymeric Lompret as Monsieur Collato
- Gérard Watkins as Pierre
- Adama Diop as Isaac
- Agnès Berthon as Madame Coum
- Alain Libolt as the priest
- Jenna Thiam as Lulu

== Production ==
The film was produced by Les Films de la Capitaine, La Féline Films aand Possibles Media. The script is partly autobiographical. It was shot between September and October 2024. Major locations were Ramatuelle and Cannes.

== Release ==
The film had its world premiere at the 82nd edition of the Venice Film Festival, serving as opening film of the International Critics' Week sidebar. It was released in French cinemas on 11 February 2026.

== Reception ==
Cineuropa's film critic Fabien Lemercier described Stereo Girls as "a film that takes many formal risks with undeniable charm", "adopting a deliberately pop and offbeat style" and "almost flirting with the idea of an over-the-top photo novel". Nicholas Bell from IonCinema compared the film to Beaches, and called it a "languid period piece" that "sings a familiar tune with too much emotional distortion".

Marilou Duponchel from Les Inrocks described it as "a haunting pop film, laced with captivating dreamlike sequences". Olivier De Bruyn from Les Echos referred to it as an "energetic and moving film [which] is full of surprises".
