= The Role of Her Life =

- Theatrical release poster
- Directed by: François Favrat
- Written by: Jérôme Beaujour; Roger Bohbot; François Favrat; Julie Lopes-Curval
- Produced by: François Kraus; Denis Pineau-Valencienne
- Starring: Agnès Jaoui; Karin Viard
- Cinematography: Pascal Marti
- Edited by: Luc Barnier; Vincent Lévy
- Music by: Philippe Rombi
- Production companies: Les Films du Kiosque; StudioCanal; France 2 Cinéma
- Distributed by: Mars Distribution
- Release date: 22 October 2004
- Running time: 100 minutes
- Country: France
- Language: French
- Budget: $3.8 million
- Box office: $5.2 million

The Role of Her Life (French: Le Rôle de sa vie) is a 2004 French drama film directed by François Favrat. Karin Viard was nominated for the Best Actress award in the César Awards 2005.

== Plot ==
The film tells the story of a freelance fashion magazine writer named Claire Rocher who meets Elisabeth Becker, an actress. Claire's life soon turns upside down after the actress decides to hire her as personal assistant.

== Cast ==
- Agnès Jaoui – Elisabeth Becker
- Karin Viard – Claire Rocher
- Jonathan Zaccaï – Mathias Curval
- Marcial Di Fonzo Bo – Luis
- Claude Crétient – Laurent Bompard
- Annie Mercier – Nicole Becker
- Laurent Lafitte – Arnaud
- Denis Sebbah – Franck
- Anna Mouglalis – Herself
- Valérie Benguigui – Viviane

== Awards and nominations ==
- César Awards (France)
  - Nominated: Best Actress – Leading Role (Karin Viard)
- Montréal Film Festival (Canada)
  - Won: Best Actress – Leading Role (Karin Viard)
  - Won: Best Screenplay (Jérôme Beaujour, Roger Bohbot, François Favrat and Julie Lopes-Curval)
  - Nominated: Grand Prix des Amériques (François Favrat)
