= Blood from a Stone =

- Film poster
- French: La mer à boire
- Directed by: Jacques Maillot
- Written by: Pierre Chosson; Jacques Maillot
- Produced by: Cyril Colbeau-Justin; Jean-Baptiste Dupont; David Giordano
- Starring: Daniel Auteuil; Maud Wyler; Yann Trégouët
- Cinematography: Luc Pagès
- Edited by: Andrea Sedlácková
- Music by: Stéphan Oliva
- Distributed by: Wild Bunch Distribution
- Release dates: December 2011 (Les Arcs); 22 February 2012 (France)
- Running time: 98 minutes
- Country: France
- Language: French
- Budget: $7.8 million
- Box office: $925.344

Blood from a Stone (French: La mer à boire) is a 2011 French drama film directed by Jacques Maillot.

== Cast ==
- Daniel Auteuil as Georges Pierret
- Maud Wyler as Jessica
- Yann Trégouët as Luis
- Alain Beigel as Yannick
- Moussa Maaskri as Hassan
- Patrick Bonnel as Richard
- Carole Franck as Hyacinthe
- Marc Chapiteau as Claude
- Geneviève Mnich as Madame Beaubery
