= On Air (film) =

2012 French film

- Karin Viard at the film's premiere in 2012
- Directed by: Pierre Pinaud
- Starring: Karin Viard; Nicolas Duvauchelle
- Release date: 11 January 2012
- Running time: 1h 29min
- Country: France
- Language: French
- Budget: $3.8 million
- Box office: $2.1 million

On Air (French: Parlez-moi de vous) is a 2012 French comedy-drama film written and directed by Pierre Pinaud. It won the best film and best actress prizes at the 2012 Festival du film de La Réunion.

== Plot ==
Claire Martin (Karin Viard) is a night radio host. She answers calls from listeners and discusses their relationships and sex lives. Her voice is well-known, but nobody knows what she looks like. One day, she decides to look for her mother who abandoned her as a child. Claire discovers that her mom lives in suburbia and tries to get to know her while remaining incognito.

== Cast ==
- Karin Viard - Claire Martin
- Nicolas Duvauchelle - Lucas
- Nadia Barentin - Joëlle Goulain
- Catherine Hosmalin - Ingrid Goulain
- Patrick Fierry - André
- François Bureloup - Bernard Goulain
- Dani - Barka
