= Happy End (2009 film) =

2009 film by Arnaud and Jean-Marie Larrieu

- Theatrical release poster
- French: Les Derniers Jours du monde
- Directed by: Arnaud Larrieu; Jean-Marie Larrieu
- Screenplay by: Arnaud Larrieu; Jean-Marie Larrieu
- Based on: Les Derniers Jours du monde by Dominique Noguez
- Produced by: Bruno Pesery
- Starring: Mathieu Amalric; Catherine Frot; Karin Viard; Sergi Lopez
- Cinematography: Thierry Arbogast
- Edited by: Annette Dutertre
- Music by: Manuel de Falla; Léo Ferré; Daniel Darc
- Production companies: Soudaine Compagnie; Arena Films; France 2 Cinéma; Mallerich Films; Estrategia Audiovisual; Filmagic Pictures Co.
- Distributed by: Wild Bunch Distribution (France); Premium Cine (Spain)
- Release dates: 9 August 2009 (Locarno); 19 August 2009 (France); 3 December 2010 (Spain)
- Running time: 130 minutes
- Countries: France; Spain
- Language: French
- Budget: $9.9 million
- Box office: $1.6 million

Happy End (French: Les Derniers Jours du monde, lit. 'The Last Days of the World') is a 2009 apocalyptic comedy-drama film written and directed by Arnaud and Jean-Marie Larrieu, based on the 1991 novel Les Derniers Jours du monde by Dominique Noguez. (Note: In the film credits, Noguez's 1997 novel Amour noir is also cited as an inspiration.) The film depicts the story of a man, Robinson, who travels across France and Spain during the end of the world.

== Plot ==
The film flips back and forth between events that take place one year apart from each other.

In the present, Robinson Laborde lives in Biarritz in his parents' apartment. He has one hand and a prosthetic. The previous year, while visiting his parents with his wife Chloé and daughter Mélanie, he sees a very attractive woman, Laetitia, on the beach and falls hopelessly in love with her. He starts an affair and, as the film develops, it is evident that he has left his family to be with her.

In the present, Robinson is looking for a notebook; the saleswoman, Ombeline, tells him that paper has become scarce and all she can offer is a cooking book with blank spaces for notes. Later on, Ombeline happens to meet Robinson at a bar and starts small talk with him; she seems to know him but he does not remember.

In the past, Laetitia has suddenly left Robinson; she is into pornography and prostitution, although she denies having any sexual involvement with her "clients". There is news about a virus that is wiping everyone in the world, but life goes on as usual. Robinson stops by a bar and finds his friend Théo, a tenor. Theo tells him a story about the time he was a music teacher to the Marquise d'Arcangues, who had a baby by him, that included Iris, who is tending the bar. The Marquise told Theo that she had a dream that if he and Iris had sex, they would save the world.

In the present, Biarritz is suddenly evacuated; Robinson decides to go to Zaragoza, Spain, to track Laetitia down. He stops by an abandoned boarding school and an earthquake occurs. Robinson continues his trip and arrives in Pamplona, where everyone is celebrating the Sanfermines. He finds Ombeline and the two walk their way through town trying to find a place to stay, to no avail. Ombeline tells Robinson that her husband has left her to search for another woman in Spain. He starts telling her his story, which he has been writing in the cooking book she sold him. Suddenly, there are terrorist attacks in Pamplona and the two leave for a hotel in the mountains; Ombeline manages to secure a suite that is usually reserved for the Royal Family. While Robinson and Ombeline have sex, helicopters are seen through the windows. Later that night, while having dinner, Ombeline sees her husband with the other woman, Iris. Since Robinson will do nothing, she calls him a coward and he leaves. While leaving the hotel, he receives a video from his daughter who is doing well off in a ship. As he records an answer, Ombeline has stolen her husband's car and they finally reach Zaragoza. Ombeline reveals that she was his father's lover, but they suddenly stopped their relationship.

In the past, Robinson and Laetitia are living together and travel to Taiwan. He is trying to have a nice traditional vacation, but she manages to ruin everything. She disappears once again and he is forced to return to France because his parents have gone missing. Laetitia suddenly reappears in Canada; he meets her there, and, as they are enjoying the snow, a couple of gangsters appear and take Laetitia back; they leave Robinson to find his way back to civilization. Due to frostbite, he loses his right hand.

In the present, Robinson tracks Laetitia's mother down, but she has no idea where her daughter is. The alarms go off and all are evacuated. Robinson and Ombeline arrive by train in Toulouse, the new capital city of France. There, he meets with his wife again who asks him to join her at her hotel, which is the new government headquarters. Robinson and his ex-wife have sex but are interrupted by a call and new alarms. In the TV monitors, news is seen that the world is sinking into chaos. Robinson abandons Ombeline and decides to go to the theatre where Theo shall be singing; as the opera goes, Ombeline finds Robinson, she is furious because he had left her, but is forced to sit and watch the opera. She wonders about men and is tired of their infidelity. She reaches into her purse and takes out Robinson's father's lamp-knife and cuts her throat. The opera is interrupted but, also, the sound of a bomb going off evacuates the theatre. Robinson wanders the streets and finds his wife who offers to take him in a military airplane to a safe place, because nuclear missiles shall be launched upon France, but he decides to stay to find Laetitia. She then decides to stay and, as she goes off to tell her party to leave, a terrorist attacks the van killing all; Robinson is injured by the debris. The next morning, all streets are deserted. Robinson stumbles back to the hotel and finds Theo there. They talk and Theo confesses that Robinson has been the love of his life. They kiss but Robinson suddenly stops. He opens the windows as Theo showers, but as he comes out of the bathroom, he jumps off the balcony and dies.

Robinson leaves the hotel with Iris, who had spent the night with Théo – her father. She tells him of a castle where there is a fall-out shelter and she knows the code to enter, they stop to eat in a country hotel where all the guests are dead. Iris dies too, it is unclear if because of the virus or due to overdose.

Robinson reaches the castle and enters with the code, he finds a decadent party going on where all the guests are enjoying their last moments on earth before going into the shelter. They are watching porn and having sex, while drinking blue martinis. Robinson breaks the news of Iris' death to the Marquise, who lays down in bed with a crucifix on her chest. Robinson spots a screen where he sees Laetitia and realises that she is still alive. As he tries to track her down on the internet, he is knocked off by an old man. The next day, all is quiet. As he wanders through the castle, he finds all the guests dead in the main salon; the servants poisoned the martinis to take over the shelter. Robinson leaves.

A couple of days later, he arrives in Paris and he walks through the deserted streets. He goes to an apartment and finally meets with Laetitia, who has been waiting for him. A bomb goes off and Robinson dreams of him and Laetitia walking naked through the living streets of Paris. They reach a building where they hide and kiss. A second and fatal bomb explodes.

== Cast ==
- Mathieu Amalric as Robinson Laborde
- Catherine Frot as Ombeline
- Karin Viard as Chloé, Robinson's wife
- Sergi Lopez as Théo
- Clotilde Hesme as Iris, Théo's daughter
- Sabine Azéma as Marquise d'Arcangues, Iris's mother
- Omahyra Mota as Laetitia "Lae"
- Pierre Pellet as Cédric Ribot
- Manon Beaudoin as Mélanie, Robinson's daughter
- Serge Bozon as Homère Magal
- Jacques Nolot as Docteur Abeberry
- Baya Belal as Laetitia's mother

== Production ==
The film was shot in Biarritz, Pamplona, Taiwan, Toulouse, the Lot department, and Paris.
