= Jonathan Zaccaï =

Belgian actor, film director and screenwriter

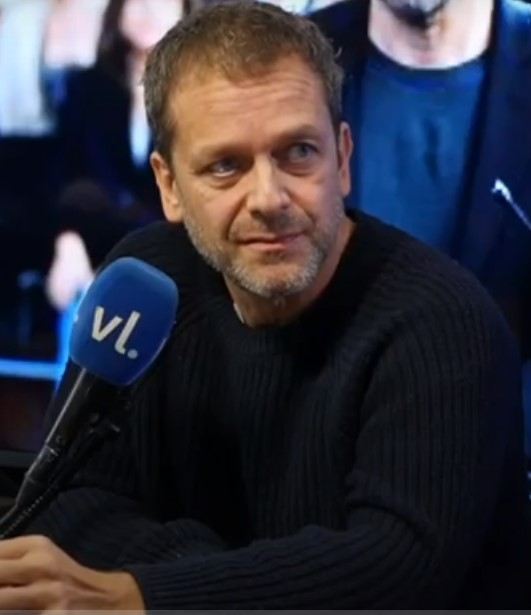
- Born: 22 July 1970 (age 55); Brussels, Belgium
- Occupations: Actor, Film director, Screenwriter, Producer
- Years active: 1990–present

Jonathan Zaccaï (born 22 July 1970) is a Belgian actor, film director and screenwriter. He is the nephew of René Kalisky and Chaïm Kaliski.

His acting credits include The Beat That My Heart Skipped, A Distant Neighborhood, The True Story of My Life in Rouen, The Role of Her Life, They Came Back.

He received the Magritte Award for Best Actor for Private Lessons.

== Filmography ==
Year	Title	Role	Notes
1992	Coupable d'innocence ou Quand la raison dort	Maximilien Bardo	Co-starring with Ute Lemper
1992	La Révolte des enfants	Grande Gueule	
1999	Tørst - Framtidens forbrytelser	Olivier	(Episode: Amertume)
2000	Petite Chérie	Victor	
2001	Les Déclassés	Nicolas de Beauville	
2001	A Hell of a Day	Pierre	
2002	Seaside	Paul	
2002	My Life on Ice	Laurent	
2003	Le Tango des Rashevski	Jonathan Rashevski	
2003	Le Rôle de sa vie	Mathias Curval	
2004	The Role of Her Life	Mathias Curval	
2004	They Came Back	Mathieu	
2004	Le Plus Beau Jour de ma vie	Arthur Després	
2005	The Beat That My Heart Skipped	Fabrice	
2005	Entre ses mains	Fabrice Gauthier	
2006	Toi et moi	Mark Bajik	
2006	La Blonde au bois dormant	Renaud Mandry	TV movie
2007	Ill Wind	Franck	
2007	Les Yeux bandés	Théo adulte	
2007	Room of Death	Vigo	
2008	Private Lessons	Pierre	Magritte Award for Best Actor
2009	Je suis venu pour elle		
2009	Simon Konianski	Simon	
2010	Blanc comme neige	Abel	
2010	Robin Hood	King Philip of France	
2010	A Distant Neighborhood	Bruno Verniaz	Nominated—Magritte Award for Best Actor
2010	With Love... from the Age of Reason	Philibert Bakary	
2011	Si tu meurs, je te tue	Philippe	
2011	JC comme Jésus Christ	Jean-Christophe Kern (Aka JC)	Also Director and Screenplay
2012	Sous le figuier	Christophe	
2012	Cornouaille	Fabrice	
2013	Les Âmes de papier	Nathan	
2014	Je te survivrai	Joe	
2014	Tiens-toi droite	Stéphane	
2014-2015	Hôtel de la plage	Martin Guignard	12 episodes
2015	Intrusion	Philippe Kessler / Marc Kessler	3 episodes
2015	Cerise	Fred	
2015-2020	The Bureau	Raymond Sisteron	44 episodes
2015	Cerise	Fred	
2016	Fleur de tonnerre	Le juge Vannier	
2016	Miséricorde	Thomas Berger	
2017	Fauves	Elvis Egger	
2018	Sink or Swim	Thibault	Nominated—Magritte Award for Best Supporting Actor
2018	The White Crow	Serge Lifar	
2018	Rémi sans famille	Jérôme Barberin	
2019	Infidèle	Matteó	
2020	Belle Fille	Anto	
2021	The Man in the Basement	David Sandberg	
2022	Downton Abbey: A New Era	Marquis de Montmirail	
2024	Monsieur Spade	Philippe Saint-André	Miniseries
