= Jean-Michel Portal =

French actor (born 1970)

Jean-Michel Portal (born 29 May 1970 in Paris) is a French actor, best known for his role in The Officers' Ward (2001), for which he was nominated for Most Promising Actor at the 27th César Awards.
