= Marcial Di Fonzo Bo =

Argentine actor and theatre director

- Born: 19 December 1968 (age 57); Buenos Aires, Argentina
- Occupation: Actor
- Years active: 1997-present

Marcial Di Fonzo Bo (born 19 December 1968) is an Argentine actor and theatre director. Since 1997, he has appeared in more than twenty films. Di Fonzo Bo directed several plays in France and was nominated for the Molière Award for Best Director in 2011.

He is the nephew of Facundo Bo, husband of Peter Adam.

== Filmography ==
Year	Title	Role	Notes
1997	The Man I Love	Martin	TV movie
1998	Disparus	Klément	
1999	New Dawn	Manu	
2000	Tout va bien, on s'en va	Frederico, Claires boyfriend	
2003	Elle est des nôtres	Le patron	
2004	The Role of Her Life	Luis	
2005	Travaux, on sait quand ça commence...	L'architecte	
2009	Making Plans for Lena	Thibault	
2010	La ligne blanche	Raul Figueiras	
2011	Midnight in Paris	Pablo Picasso	
2011	Polissia	Le prof de gym	
2015	Lost in Munich		
