= They Came Back =

- Directed by: Robin Campillo
- Written by: Robin Campillo; Brigitte Tijou
- Produced by: Caroline Benjo; Carole Scotta
- Starring: Géraldine Pailhas; Jonathan Zaccaï; Frédéric Pierrot
- Cinematography: Jeanne Lapoirie
- Edited by: Robin Campillo
- Music by: Jocelyn Pook; Martin Wheeler
- Distributed by: Haut et Court
- Release dates: 4 September 2004 (Venice); 27 October 2004 (France)
- Running time: 102 minutes
- Country: France
- Language: French

They Came Back (French: Les Revenants), known in the UK as The Returned, is a 2004 French horror drama film directed by Robin Campillo in his directorial debut. The film was screened at the Hamburg Fantasy Filmfest in Germany, the Venice Film Festival in Italy, and the Toronto International Film Festival in Canada.

Unlike the typical zombie film, in which the physically deformed undead compulsively feed on or otherwise harm the human population, the physically normal undead in They Came Back seek only to reintegrate themselves into the everyday life of the small French town where they formerly lived, or so it seems.

== Plot ==
The recently deceased of an anonymous French town suddenly return to life, calmly streaming forth from a cemetery in a silent procession. The town council, led by the mayor, makes plans to house the returned and help reintroduce them to society. The mayor informs the council that the event has lasted for roughly two hours throughout France, returning an estimated 70 million people to life nationwide, with more than 13,000 in their town alone, all of whom had died within the previous 10 years.

As expected, the reintegration poses challenges. The returned suffer from effects similar to those that may be seen after severe concussion, such as disorientation, sleep disturbance, and wandering. Former professionals among the returned are moved to menial jobs when it becomes clear that although they can perform rote tasks, they no longer engage in spontaneous problem solving or planning. Even their apparent consciousness may be an illusion. This behaviour adds to the growing sentiment that the returned are different from their former selves. While the returned generally function sluggishly during the day, a doctor Gardet has become suspicious of the returned after observing some of them clandestinely attending animated meetings, conducted in the middle of the night, during which these symptoms seem to disappear.

The returned reunite with their former loved ones: the mayor's wife Martha with the mayor, 6-year-old Sylvain with his parents, young Mathieu, with his wife Rachel.

Rachel is initially reluctant to see Mathieu, until one day he follows her home, acting as though he never left. Rachel eventually accepts him and the two make love. In addition to the nocturnal meetings of the returned, Gardet also observes the gradual reunion of Rachel and Mathieu with growing concern, but when warning Rachel of possible danger, she rebuffs him.

One evening a series of explosions tears through the town, seemingly detonated by the returned in an act of mass sabotage but without inflicting any casualties. In the chaos the returned head for a network of tunnels. The mayor attempts to stop his wife from leaving but begins to feel ill and after Martha urges him to "give in", apparently dies only to appear among the returned. The military responds by gassing the returned with a chemical that induces permanent coma.

After guiding some of the returned to the tunnels, Mathieu makes his way back to Rachel and recounts to her the events leading to his fatal car accident. He reveals that he crashed the car while looking for her after the two had fought. Rachel follows him into the tunnels, tearfully kissing him before he disappears into the darkness. She returns to the surface and observes the military carting away the comatose bodies. The bodies are laid atop their graves in the cemetery and slowly vanish.

== Cast ==
- Géraldine Pailhas as Rachel
- Jonathan Zaccaï as Mathieu
- Frédéric Pierrot as Gardet
- Victor Garrivier as The mayor
- Catherine Samie as Martha
- Djemel Barek as Isham
- Marie Matheron as Véronique
- Saady Delas as Sylvain

== Production ==
The film was shot in Tours in August 2003, in the middle of the deadly 2003 European heatwave.

== Critical response ==
On Rotten Tomatoes, They Came Back holds an approval rating of 78% based on nine reviews, with an average rating of 6.2/10.

Critical reception was mixed to positive. Ed Gonzalez of Slant Magazine described the film as "a haunting and poetic exploration of loss and denial." French critic Philippe Azoury of Libération called it "a meditation on memory and mortality in a France haunted by its past." In a more negative review, J. Hoberman of The Village Voice wrote that the film "suffers from long-winded earnestness and, despite some poetic conceits, its allegory ultimately doesn't parse."

== Spin-offs ==
- Les Revenants (TV series), a French television series adaptation of the film
  - The Returned (U.S. TV series), an American remake of the French TV series
