= Haut les cœurs! =

- Film poster
- Directed by: Sólveig Anspach
- Written by: Sólveig Anspach; Pierre-Erwan Guillaume
- Produced by: Patrick Sobelman
- Starring: Karin Viard; Laurent Lucas
- Cinematography: Mathilde Jaffre; Isabelle Razavet; Lorenzo Weiss
- Edited by: Mathieu Blanc; Anne Riegel
- Music by: Olivier Manoury; Martin Wheeler; Eldar Mansurov
- Production companies: Ex Nihilo; Agat Films & Cie; Entre Chien et Loup; Radio Télévision Belge Francophone
- Distributed by: Diaphana Films
- Release date: 3 November 1999 (France)
- Running time: 110 minutes
- Countries: France; Belgium
- Language: French
- Budget: $1.7 million
- Box office: $1.6 million

Haut les cœurs! (transl. Top hearts!), also known as Chin Up!, is a 1999 French-Belgian drama film directed by Sólveig Anspach, starring Karin Viard and Laurent Lucas. Viard won the César Award for Best Actress and the Lumière Award for Best Actress for her performance in the film.

== Cast ==
- Karin Viard as Emma
- Laurent Lucas as Simon
- Claire Wauthion as Emma's mother
- Julien Cottereau as Olivier
