= François Favrat =

- Occupation(s): Film director, screenwriter, actor
- Years active: 1996–present

François Favrat is a French film director, screenwriter and occasional actor, best known for directing The Role of Her Life and Boomerang.

== Filmography ==
=== As filmmaker ===
Year	Title	Credited as		Notes
Year	Title	Director	Screenwriter	Notes
2001	Mon meilleur amour	Yes	Yes	Short film Clermont-Ferrand International Short Film Festival - SACD Award; Clermont-Ferrand International Short Film Festival - Special Mention of the Youth Jury
2002	Seaside		Yes	
2003	She's One of Us		Yes	
2004	The Role of Her Life	Yes	Yes	Montreal World Film Festival - Best Screenplay
2009	Bitter Victory	Yes	Yes	
2015	Boomerang	Yes	Yes	

=== As actor ===
Year	Title	Role	Notes
2000	Petit Ben	Bartender	
2004	Red Lights		
2011	Une vie meilleure	The banker	
