= Secret Name (film) =

2021 French film

- Directed by: Aurélia Georges
- Written by: Aurélia Georges; Maud Ameline
- Starring: Lyna Khoudri; Sabine Azéma; Maud Wyler
- Music by: Frédéric Vercheval
- Release dates: 9 August 2021 (Locarno); 19 January 2022 (France)
- Running time: 112 minutes
- Country: France
- Language: French
- Box office: $267,356

Secret Name (French: La Place d'une autre, lit. 'The Place of another') is a 2021 French drama film directed and co-written by Aurélia Georges, and starring Lyna Khoudri, Maud Wyler and Sabine Azéma.

The film was inspired by the 1873 novel The New Magdalen by Wilkie Collins.

Secret Name premiered at Locarno Film Festival on 9 August 2021 where it was nominated for Golden Leopard award in 'Best Film' category. The film was released theatrically in France on 19 January 2022.

== Plot ==
In 1914 during WWI, Nélie Laborde (Lyna Khoudri), a young nurse from a humble background, meets Rose Juillet (Maud Wyler), an upper class Swiss woman. When their building is hit by German artillery fire and Rose is mortally wounded, Nélie takes on her identity and presents herself in her place at the house of a wealthy woman in search of a better life.

== Cast ==
- Lyna Khoudri as Nélie Laborde
- Sabine Azéma as Eléonore de Lengwil
- Maud Wyler as Rose Juillet
- Laurent Poitrenaux as Julien Valence
- Didier Brice as Massip

== Production ==
Filming took place in October 2020 in Nancy, with the city's streets standing in for Paris. Filming then continued in Obernai (Bas-Rhin), and in Xaronval and Senones (Vosges)
