= Emmanuelle Castro =

French film editor

Emmanuelle Castro is a French film editor. She is most noted as a two-time César Award winner for Best Editing, winning at the 13th César Awards in 1988 for Au revoir les enfants, and at the 25th César Awards in 2000 for Voyages.

She also received a Genie Award nomination for Best Editing at the 16th Genie Awards in 1996 for The Confessional (Le Confessionnal).
