= Aunt Hilda! =

- Movie poster
- Directed by: Benoît Chieux; Jacques-Rémy Girerd
- Written by: Benoît Chieux; Jacques-Rémy Girerd; Iouri Tcherenkov
- Produced by: Jacques-Rémy Girerd; Stéphan Roelants
- Starring: Sabine Azéma; Josiane Balasko
- Cinematography: Benoît Razy
- Edited by: Hervé Guichard
- Music by: Serge Besset
- Distributed by: SND Films
- Release date: 7 July 2013 (La Rochelle)
- Running time: 89 min
- Country: France
- Language: French
- Box office: $700,000

Aunt Hilda! (French: Tante Hilda!; also known as Auntie Hilda in the United States) is a 2013 animated French film directed by Benoît Chieux and Jacques-Rémy Girerd.

== Plot ==
The film is set in Beaumont-les-Vignes, a fictional town in south-eastern France in the near future. Two sisters, Hilda and Dolores, followed diametrically opposite course. Hilda, a young redhead with a lanky silhouette, is a fierce environmentalist: she goes around on a bicycle, is always concerned about the preservation of the environment and gathered a plant museum where she keeps all kinds of plants. Dolores, on the other side, became the ruthless CEO of a multinational food company seeking profits in the short term. Thanks to the GMO technology that involves genetically modifying plants, Dolores has developed a new cereal called Attilem, a kind of giant artichoke with tentacles. This new product, able to grow with very little water and no fertilizer, should bring her astronomical profits. She says it could even solve the problem of hunger in the world and replace oil as a new source of energy. But soon the Attilem plants begin to grow too fast, out of control, and invade the world. Dolores design then a pesticide and proposes to sell to governments to fight against the disaster that her company has provoked. Aunt Hilda does not agree and began to work to save the world her way, but the game is not over.

== Cast ==
Character	French voice actor	English voice actor
Aunt Hilda	Sabine Azéma	
Dolorès	Josiane Balasko	
Ike	François Morel	
Turner	Bruno Lochet	
Michael Aldashin	Serguei Vladimirov	
The President	Gilles Détroit	
Julio Attilio	Bernard Bouillon	
Johnson	Christian Taponard	
Marie	Line Wiblé	
Pierre	Jean-Pierre Yvars	

== Accolades ==
Year	Award	Category	Recipient	Result
2014	Berlin International Film Festival	Generation Kplus - Best Film	Benoît Chieux, Jacques-Rémy Girerd	Nominated
