= Hélène Fillières =

French actress, film director and screenwriter

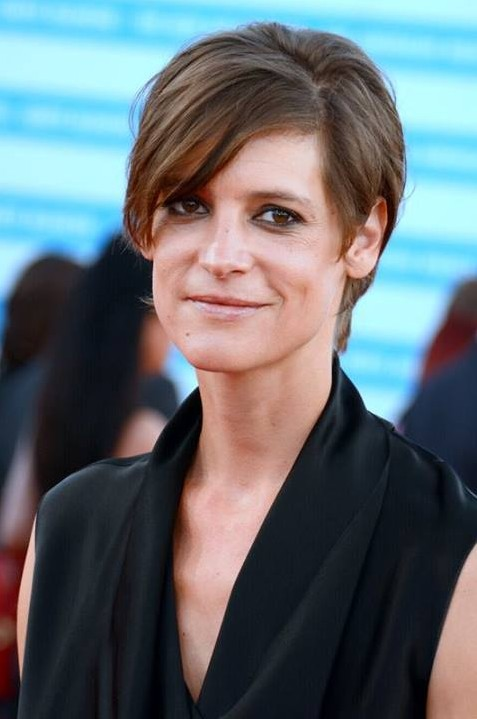
- Hélène Fillières at the 2013 Deauville American Film Festival
- Born: 1 May 1972 (age 54); Paris, France
- Occupations: Actress, film director, screenwriter
- Years active: 1989–present
- Relatives: Sophie Fillières (sister); Agathe Bonitzer (niece)

Hélène Fillières (French pronunciation: [elɛn filjɛʁ]; born 1 May 1972) is a French actress, film director and screenwriter. She is the sister of filmmaker Sophie Fillières.

She is on the jury of the Prix Fitzgerald, a literary prize in the French Riviera where Francis Scott Fitzgerald wrote Tender is the Night.

== Filmography ==
=== As actress ===
Year	Title	Role	Notes
1989	Les sirènes		Short film
1991	Des filles et des chiens		Short film
1992	Lover	Girl at party	
1993	Sauve-toi	La fille à vélo	
1993	Nulle part		
1994	3000 scénarios contre un virus		
1994	Grande petite	Laurence	
1995	Adultery: A User's Guide	Joséphine	
1996	Encore	Aurore	
1996	Passage à l'acte	Alexandra	
1998	Les kidnappeurs	Nuage	
1998	Nous sommes le peuple		Short film
1998	Histoire naturelle		Short film
1999	Venus Beauty Institute	La fiancée d'Antoine	
1999	Peut-être	Rosemonde	
1999	Season's Beatings	Véronique	
2000	Ouch	Aïe	
2000	Tontaine et Tonton	La voisine	TV movie
2001	Combats de femme	Jeanne	TV series
2001	A Hell of a Day	Marie Larue	Nominated—César Award for Most Promising Actress
2001	Madonna à Lourdes		Short film
2001	L'apprentissage de la ville	Clotilde	TV movie
2001	Demain et tous les jours après	Lisa	TV movie
2002	Seaside	Marie	
2002	Nearest to Heaven	Lucie	
2002	Vendredi soir	La femme fatiguée	
2003	A Man, a Real One	Marilyne	
2003	France Boutique	Marine	
2003	Variété française	Edith	
2003	La fin du règne animal	Olivia	
2005	Venus and Apollo	Betty Pages	TV series
2005	Les Rois maudits	Marguerite de Bourgogne	TV mini-series
2006	Mademoiselle Y		Short film
2006	Deux fois par semaine		Short film
2006	Hotel Harabati	Marion	
2006	Call Me Agostino	Hélène	
2006	Lady Chatterley	Hilda	
2006 - 2014	Mafiosa	Sandra Paoli	TV series
2007	Fille unique	Le mère	Short film
2008	Coupable	Marguerite	
2008	X Femmes	Claire	TV series
2008 - 2010	Collection Fred Vargas	Camille Forestier	TV series
2009	La grande vie	Véronique	
2010	Pièce montée	Agnès	
2010	Petite fille	Sylvie Neige	TV movie
2011	Les yeux de sa mère	Mélodie Khan	
2011	Low Life		
2012	Les papas du dimanche	Jeanne	
2012	Coming Home	Anne Morellini	
2013	Bastards	Banker	
2013	Opium	Marie-Laure de Noailles	
2016	Ares	Jean-Patrick Benes	
2018	Volontaire	Weber	

=== As director and screenwriter ===
Year	Title	Notes
2006	Mademoiselle Y	Short film
2013	Tied	
2018	Volontaire	
