= Voyages (film) =

- Directed by: Emmanuel Finkiel
- Written by: Emmanuel Finkiel
- Produced by: Yaëe Fogiel
- Starring: Shulamit Adar; Liliane Rovère
- Cinematography: Hans Meier
- Edited by: Emmanuelle Castro
- Production company: Les Films du Poisson
- Distributed by: MK2 Diffusion
- Release date: 17 May 1999 (CFF)
- Running time: 115 minutes
- Country: France
- Language: French

Voyages is a 1999 French drama film directed by Emmanuel Finkiel. The film was screened at the Directors' Fortnight event of the 1999 Cannes Film Festival and won the Award of the Youth for French Film.

== Cast ==
- Shulamit Adar - Rivka
- Liliane Rovère - Regine
- Esther Gorintin - Vera
- Natan Cogan - Graneck
- Mosko Alkalai - Shimon
- Maurice Chevit - Mendelbaum
