= Julie Lopes-Curval =

French film director, screenwriter, theatre director and playwright

- Occupation(s): Film director, Screenwriter, Theatre director, Playwright
- Years active: 1992–present

Julie Lopes-Curval is a French film director, screenwriter, theatre director, and playwright. Her directorial debut Seaside was showcased in the Directors' Fortnight section at the 2002 Cannes Film Festival, where it won the Caméra d'Or.

== Filmography ==
Year	Film	Credited as		Notes
Year	Film	Director	Screenwriter	Notes
1999	Adolescents		Yes	
2001	Mademoiselle Butterfly	Yes	Yes	Short film
2002	Seaside	Yes	Yes	Cannes Film Festival—Caméra d'Or
2003	A Great Little Business		Yes	
2004	The Role of Her Life		Yes	
2006	Toi et moi	Yes	Yes	
2009	Hidden Diary	Yes	Yes	
2014	High Society	Yes	Yes	
2016	L'Annonce	Yes	Yes	Telefilm

== Plays ==
- Vitrines
- La Vitesse du passant
