= Arnaud and Jean-Marie Larrieu =

French filmmaking duo

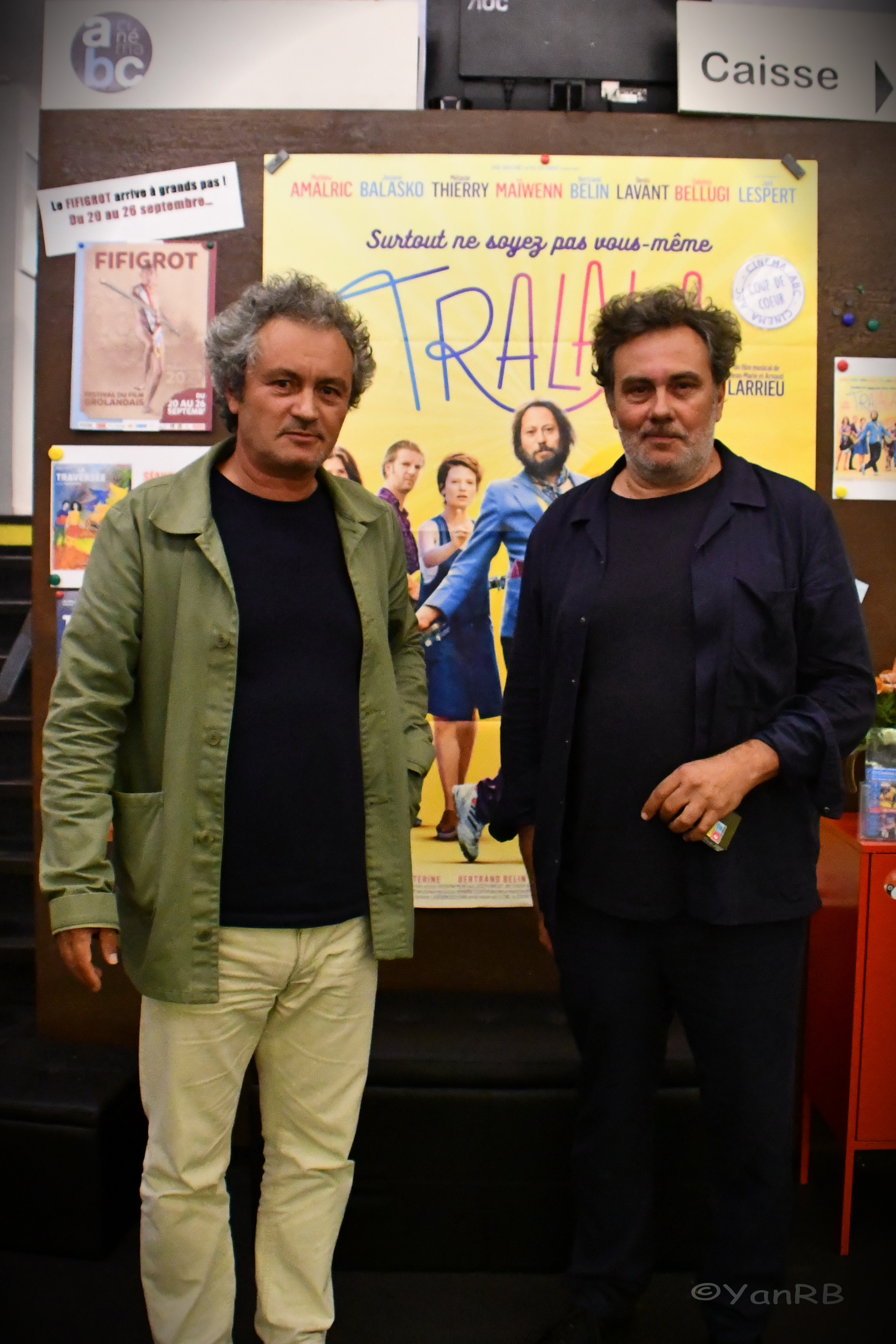
- Arnaud (left) and Jean-Marie (right) Larrieu in 2021
- Born: Arnaud: 31 March 1966 (age 60); Lourdes, France Jean-Marie: 8 April 1965 (age 61); Lourdes, France
- Years active: 1987–present

Arnaud Larrieu (born 31 March 1966) and Jean-Marie Larrieu (born 8 April 1965), collectively referred to as the Larrieu brothers, are a French filmmaking duo. They write and direct their films together.

== Career ==
Their film To Paint or Make Love was entered into the 2005 Cannes Film Festival.

== Filmography ==
=== Feature films ===
| Year | English Title | Original Title | Notes |
|---|---|---|---|
| 1999 | Summer's End | Fin d'été | |
| 2003 | A Man, a Real One | Un homme, un vrai | |
| 2005 | To Paint or Make Love | Peindre ou faire l'amour | |
| 2008 | Le Voyage aux Pyrénées | | |
| 2009 | Happy End | | |
| 2013 | Love Is the Perfect Crime | | |
| 2015 | 21 Nights with Pattie | | |
| 2021 | Tralala | | |
| 2024 | Jim's Story | Le Roman de Jim | |
| TBA | La Foudre | | Filming |

=== Short films ===
| Year | Title | Notes |
|---|---|---|
| 1987 | Court voyage (Note: Jean-Marie sole director) | Also cinematographers and editors |
| 1991 | Les Baigneurs (Note: Jean-Marie sole director) | Also editors |
| 1993 | Bernard ou Les apparitions (Note: Arnaud sole director) | Also editors |
| 2000 | La Brèche de Roland | |
| 2001 | Madonna à Lourdes | |

=== Documentaries ===
| Year | Title | Notes |
|---|---|---|
| 1988 | Temps couvert | Short, also cinematographers and editors |
| 1992 | Ce jour-là | Also cinematographers and editors |
| 2005 | Les Fenêtres sont ouvertes | Also cinematographers |
