= Danièle Thompson =

French screenwriter and director (born 1942)

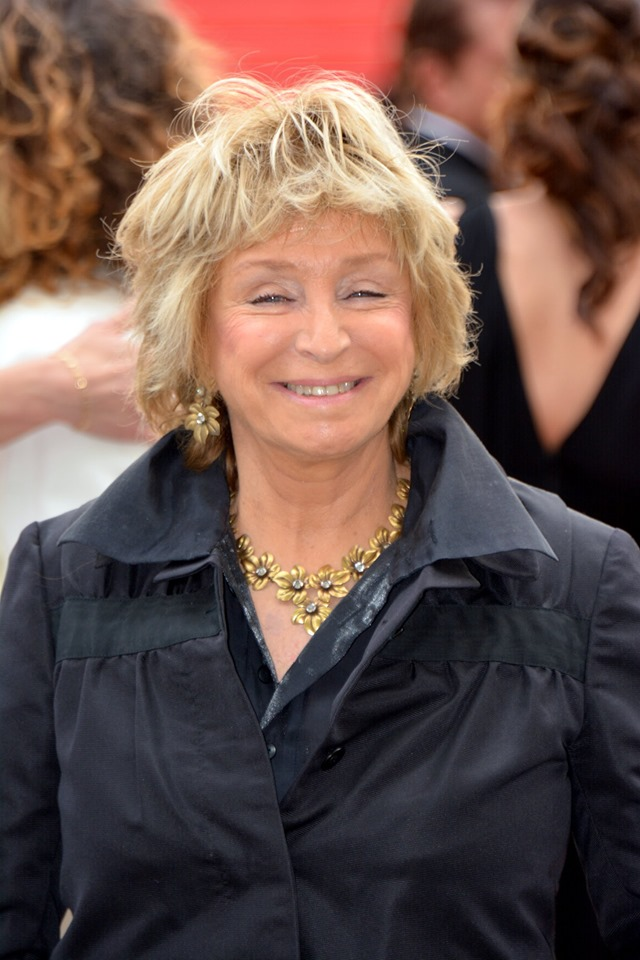
- Thompson at the 2019 Cannes Film Festival
- Born: Danièle Claude Renée Tannenbaum; 3 January 1942 (age 84); Monaco
- Occupations: Screenwriter; film director
- Years active: 1966–present

Danièle Claude Renée Tannenbaum, also known as Danièle Thompson (born 3 January 1942) is a Monegasque film director and screenwriter. Thompson is the daughter of film director Gérard Oury, and actress Jacqueline Roman.

== Life ==
Thompson was born on 3 January 1942 in Monaco. She is the daughter of film director Gérard Oury, and actress Jacqueline Roman. She moved to New York with her mother in 1960, and married Richard Thompson two years later. Thompson's son is the actor Christopher Thompson. They have written screenplays together, most notably those of Jet Lag and Season's Beatings. Thompson later married producer and agent Albert Koski.

In 2009, Thompson signed a petition in support of film director Roman Polanski, calling for his release after Polanski was arrested in Switzerland in relation to his 1977 sexual abuse case.

In 2010, she joined Isabelle Adjani, Paul Auster, Isabelle Huppert, Milan Kundera, Salman Rushdie, Mathilde Seigner, Jean-Pierre Thiollet and Henri Tisot in signing the petition in support of Roman Polanski when the film director was temporarily arrested by Swiss police at the request of U.S. authorities.

Thompson was for two years an artist's model for American painter Tom Wesselman.

== Work ==
From the 1970s to the 1990s, Thompson worked as a screenwriter, before moving into directing. Thompson has written screenplays for a number of highly successful films including Cousin, cousine, La Boum, Belphégor - Le fantôme du Louvre, La Reine Margot, and Jet Lag, which she also directed. She was nominated for the 1976 Academy Award for Writing Original Screenplay for Cousin, cousine. Her 2006 film, Fauteuils d'orchestre was France's entrant for the Academy Award for Best Foreign Film. and was on the 1986 Cannes Film Festival jury. In 2016 she directed a French language film, Cezanne et moi, about the relationship between Paul Cézanne and Émile Zola.

Thompson was the writer and director of a 2023 television series Bardot, about Brigitte Bardot.

== Filmography ==
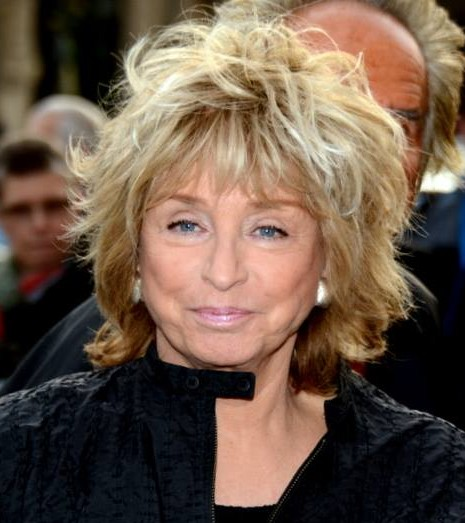
Thompson in 2014, at the premiere of the film Salaud, on t'aime.

=== Film ===
Year	Title	Director	Writer	Notes
1966	La Grande Vadrouille	No	Yes	
1969	The Brain	No	Yes	
1971	Delusions of Grandeur	No	Yes	
1973	The Mad Adventures of Rabbi Jacob	No	Yes	
1975	Cousin Cousine	No	Yes	
1978	La Carapate	No	Yes	Also soundtrack
1978	Va voir maman, papa travaille	No	Yes	
1980	The Umbrella Coup	No	Yes	
1980	La Boum	No	Yes	
1982	Ace of Aces	No	Yes	
1982	La Boum 2	No	Yes	
1984	The Vengeance of the Winged Serpent	No	Yes	
1987	Malady of Love	No	Yes	
1987	Lévy et Goliath	No	Yes	
1988	L'Étudiante	No	Yes	
1989	Vanille fraise	No	Yes	
1991	La neige et le feu	No	Yes	
1993	Les marmottes	No	Yes	
1994	La Reine Margot	No	Yes	
1998	Paparazzi	No	Yes	
1998	Those Who Love Me Can Take the Train	No	Yes	
1999	Season's Beatings	Yes	Yes	
1999	Belle maman	No	Yes	Also soundtrack
2001	Belphegor, Phantom of the Louvre	No	Yes	
2002	Jet Lag	Yes	Yes	
2004	The Giraffe's Neck	No	Yes	
2006	Avenue Montaigne	Yes	Yes	
2009	Change of Plans	Yes	Yes	
2013	Des gens qui s'embrassent	Yes	Yes	
2016	Cézanne and I	Yes	Yes	

=== Television writer ===
Year	Title	Notes
1978	Claudine	3 episodes
1992–1998	Une famille formidable	12 episodes; Also creator

TV movies

- La femme de l'amant (1992)
- Le Rouge et Le Noir (1997)
- Des gens si bien élevés (1997)
- Les grandes occasions (2006)

Miniseries

- Petit déjeuner compris (1980)
- Le Tiroir secret (1986) (Also soundtrack)
- La bicyclette bleue (2000)

== Awards and nominations ==
Academy Awards

Year	Title	Category	Result
1975	Cousin Cousine	Best Original Screenplay	Nominated

César Awards

Year	Title	Category	Result
1975	Cousin Cousine	Best Screenplay or Adaptation	Nominated
1994	La Reine Margot	Best Screenplay or Adaptation	Nominated
1998	Those Who Love Me Can Take the Train	Best Screenplay or Adaptation	Nominated
1999	Season's Beatings	Best Screenplay or Adaptation	Nominated
1999	Season's Beatings	Best First Film	Nominated
2006	Avenue Montaigne	Best Original Screenplay	Nominated

Other awards

Year	Title	Award	Category	Result
1999	Season's Beatings	Lumière Awards	Best Screenplay	Won
2006	Avenue Montaigne	Globe de Cristal Awards	Best Film	Nominated
