= Achab =

Achab may refer to:

- Achab or Ahab, ancient Israelite king
- Capitaine Achab, French short film directed by Philippe Ramos
- Imad Achab Kanouni, French citizen who was held in extrajudicial detention in the United States Guantanamo Bay detention camps, in Cuba
- Jaouad Achab, taekwondo practitioner from Belgium
- Mustapha Achab, Moroccan footballer.

== See also ==
- Ahab (disambiguation)
- Captain Ahab (disambiguation)
