= 2001 Cannes Film Festival =

- Official poster of the 54th Cannes Film Festival.
- Opening film: Moulin Rouge!
- Closing film: Savage Souls
- Location: Cannes, France
- Founded: 1946
- Awards: Palme d'Or: The Son's Room
- Hosted by: Charlotte Rampling
- No. of films: 23 (In Competition)
- Festival date: 9 May 2001 – 20 May 2001
- Website: festival-cannes.com/en

Cannes Film Festival
- 2002 2000

The 54th Cannes Film Festival took place from 9 to 20 May 2001. Norwegian actress and director Liv Ullmann served as the Jury President of the main competition; she replaced American actress and filmmaker Jodie Foster, who had to step down due to scheduling conflicts with the film Panic Room. Italian filmmaker Nanni Moretti won the Palme d'Or for the drama film The Son's Room.

The festival opened with Moulin Rouge! by Baz Luhrmann, and closed with Savage Souls by Raúl Ruiz.

2001 Un Certain Regard poster.

== Juries ==
=== Main competition ===
- Liv Ullmann, Norwegian actress and director - Jury President
- Mimmo Calopresti, Italian filmmaker and actor
- Charlotte Gainsbourg, English-French actress and singer
- Terry Gilliam, British filmmaker and actor
- Mathieu Kassovitz, French actor and filmmaker
- Sandrine Kiberlain, French actress
- Philippe Labro, French director and author
- Julia Ormond, British actress
- Moufida Tlatli, Tunisian filmmaker and editor
- Edward Yang, Taiwanese filmmaker

=== Un Certain Regard ===
- Ariane Ascaride, French actress - Jury President
- Virginie Apiou, French film critic
- François-Guillaume Lorrain, French film critic
- Florence Malraux, French film critic
- Thomas Sotinel, French film critic

=== Cinéfondation and Short Films Competition ===
- Erick Zonca, French director - Jury President
- Valeria Bruni-Tedeschi, Italian-French actress and filmmaker
- Samira Makhmalbaf, Iranian filmmaker
- Rithy Panh, Cambodian filmmaker
- Lynne Ramsay, Scottish filmmaker

=== Camera d'Or ===
- Maria de Medeiros, Portuguese actress and director - Jury President
- Loïc Barbier, cinephile
- Stefano Della Casa, critic
- Sophie Denize, representative of the technical industries
- Franck Garbaz, critic
- Mercedes Goiz, critic
- Dominique Le Rigoleur, cinematographer
- Claire Simon, director

== Official Selection ==
=== In Competition ===
The following feature films competed for the Palme d'Or:

English title	Original title	Director(s)	Production country
Desert Moon	月の砂漠	Shinji Aoyama	Japan
Distance		Hirokazu Kore-eda	Japan
I'm Going Home	Je rentre à la maison / Vou para Casa	Manoel de Oliveira	France, Portugal
In Praise of Love	Éloge de l'amour	Jean-Luc Godard	France, Switzerland
Kandahar	قندهار	Mohsen Makhmalbaf	Iran
The Man Who Wasn't There		Joel Coen	United States
Millennium Mambo	千禧曼波	Hou Hsiao-hsien	Taiwan
Moulin Rouge! (opening film)		Baz Luhrmann	Australia, United States
Mulholland Drive		David Lynch	United States, France
No Man's Land	Ничија земља	Danis Tanović	Bosnia and Herzegovina, France, Slovenia, United Kingdom, Belgium
The Officers' Ward	La Chambre des officiers	François Dupeyron	France
Pau and His Brother	Pau i el seu germà	Marc Recha	Spain, France
The Piano Teacher	La Pianiste	Michael Haneke	France, Austria, Germany
The Pledge		Sean Penn	United States
The Profession of Arms	Il mestiere delle armi	Ermanno Olmi	Italy
Replay	La répétition	Catherine Corsini	France, Canada
Roberto Succo		Cédric Kahn	France
Shrek		Andrew Adamson and Vicky Jenson	United States
Taurus	Телец	Alexander Sokurov	Russia
The Son's Room	La stanza del figlio	Nanni Moretti	Italy
Va savoir		Jacques Rivette	France
Warm Water Under a Red Bridge	赤い橋の下のぬるい水	Shōhei Imamura	Japan
What Time Is It There?	你那邊幾點	Tsai Ming-liang	Taiwan

=== Un Certain Regard ===
The following films were selected for the competition of Un Certain Regard:

English title	Original title	Director(s)	Production country
The Anniversary Party		Jennifer Jason Leigh and Alan Cumming	United States
Atanarjuat: The Fast Runner	ᐊᑕᓈᕐᔪᐊᑦ	Zacharias Kunuk	Canada
Boyhood Loves	Amour d'enfance	Yves Caumon	France
Carrément à l'Ouest		Jacques Doillon	France
The Chimp	Маймыл	Aktan Abdykalykov	Kyrgyzstan, Russia, France, Japan
Clément		Emmanuelle Bercot	France
Freedom	La libertad	Lisandro Alonso	Argentina
Get a Life	Ganhar a Vida	João Canijo	Portugal
H Story		Nobuhiro Suwa	Japan
Hijack Stories		Oliver Schmitz	South Africa
Just the Two of Us	Ты да я, да мы с тобой	Alexander Veledinsky	Russia
Lan Yu	藍宇	Stanley Kwan	China
Late Marriage	חתונה מאוחרת	Dover Kosashvili	Israel, France
Lovely Rita		Jessica Hausner	Austria
Man Walking on Snow	歩く、人	Masahiro Kobayashi	Japan
No Such Thing	Skrímsli	Hal Hartley	United States, Iceland
Pattiyude Divasam	പട്ടിയുടെ ദിവസം	Murali Nair	India
Pulse	回路	Kiyoshi Kurosawa	Japan
The Road	Дорога	Darezhan Omirbaev	Kazakhstan, France, Japan
'R Xmas		Abel Ferrara	United States
Storytelling		Todd Solondz	United States
Tears of the Black Tiger	ฟ้าทะลายโจร	Wisit Sasanatieng	Thailand
Tomorrow	Domani	Francesca Archibugi	Italy
The Words of My Father	Le parole di mio padre	Francesca Comencini	Italy

=== Out of Competition ===
The following films were selected to be screened out of competition:

English title	Original title	Director(s)	Production country
ABC Africa		Abbas Kiarostami	Iran
Apocalypse Now Redux		Francis Ford Coppola	United States
Avalon	アヴァロン	Mamoru Oshii	Japan, Poland
The Center of the World		Wayne Wang	United States
CQ		Roman Coppola	United States, Luxembourg, France, Italy
Human Nature		Michel Gondry	United States, France
My Voyage to Italy	Il mio viaggio in Italia	Martin Scorsese	United States, Italy
Savage Souls (closing film)	Les âmes fortes	Raúl Ruiz	France, Belgium, Switzerland
Sobibor, October 14, 1943, 4 p.m.	Sobibór, 14 octobre 1943, 16 heures	Claude Lanzmann	France
Trouble Every Day		Claire Denis	France, Germany, Japan

=== Cinéfondation ===
The following films were selected for the competition of Cinéfondation:

- Antiromantika by Nariman Turebayev
- Bucarest - Vienne 8: 15 by Cătălin Mitulescu
- Crow Stone by Alicia Duffy
- Dai Bi by Chao Yang
- Fuldmane Vanvid by Anders Worm
- I Can Fly To You But You... by Young-Nam Kim
- J'espère, J'attends by Ewa Banaszkiewicz
- L'age Tendre by Eric Forestier
- La Cire, Ça Fait Mal by Maya Dreifuss
- Le Jour Où Toshi Est Né by Hikaru Yoshikawa
- Les Yeux Devorants by Syllas Tzoumerkas
- Martin Quatre Ans by Ben Hackworth
- Monsieur William, Les Traces D'une Vie Possible by Denis Gaubert
- Portrait by Sergei Luchishin
- Premiere Experience De Mort by Aida Begić
- Reparation by Jens Jonsson
- Svetlo by David Sukup
- Telecommande by Ethan Tobman
- Un Veau Pleurait, La Nuit by John Shank
- Zero Deficit by Ruth Mader

=== Short Films Competition ===
The following short films competed for the Short Film Palme d'Or:

- Bean Cake by David Greenspan
- Chicken by Barry Dignam
- Bird in the Wire by Phillip Donnellon
- La Famille Sacree by Dong-Il Shin
- Daddy's Girl by Irvine Allan
- The Reel Truth by Tim Hamilton
- Just Little Birds (Les petits oiseaux) by Fred Louf
- Natural Glasses (Naturlige Briller) by Jens Lien
- Music For One Apartment And Six Drummers by Johannes Stjärne Nilsson and Ola Simonsson
- Paulette by Louise-Marie Colon
- Pizza Passionata by Kari Juusonen

== Parallel sections ==
=== International Critics' Week ===
The following films were screened for the 40th International Critics' Week (40e Semaine de la Critique):

Feature film competition

- Under the Moonlight (Zir-e Noor-e Maah) by Seyyed Reza Mir-Karimi (Iran)
- Unloved by Kunitoshi Manda (Japan)
- Bolivia by Adrián Caetano (Argentina)
- The Woman Who Drinks (La Femme qui boit) by Bernard Émond (Canada)
- The Pornographer (Le Pornographe) by Bertrand Bonello (France, Canada)
- Almost Blue by Alex Infascelli (Italy)
- Ephemeral Town (Efimeri poli) by Giorgos Zafiris (Greece)

Short film competition

- Le Dos au mur by Bruno Collet (France)
- Eat by Bill Plympton (United States)
- Forklift Driver Klaus – The First Day on the Job (Staplerfahrer Klaus - Der erste Arbeitstag) by Jörg Wagner and Stefan Prehn (Germany)
- Field by Duane Hopkins (United Kingdom)
- L'Enfant de la haute mer by L. Gabrielli, P. Marteel, M. Renoux and M. Tourret (France)
- Stranger and Native (Biganeh va boumi) by Ali Mohammad Ghasem (Iran)
- Noche de Bodas by Carlos Cuarón (Mexico)

Special screenings

- The Black Beach (La plage noire) by Michel Piccoli (France) (opening film)
- Kes by Ken Loach (United Kingdom) (La séance du Parrain)
- Souffle by Muriel Coulin (France) (17 min.) (Prix de la Critique)
- True Love Waits (Taivas Tiella) by Johanna Vuoksenmaa (Finland) (34 min.) (Prix de la Critique)
- Clouds: Letters to My Son (Nuages: Lettres à mon fils) by Marion Hänsel (Belgium) (closing film)

=== Directors' Fortnight ===
The following films were screened for the 2001 Directors' Fortnight (Quinzaine des Réalizateurs):

- Big Bad Love by Arliss Howard
- Bintou by Fanta Régina Nacro (31 min.)
- Boli shaonu by Lai Miu-suet
- That Old Dream That Moves (Ce vieux rêve qui bouge) by Alain Guiraudie (50 min.)
- Ceci est mon corps by Rodolphe Marconi
- Central by Dominique Gonzalez-Foerster (10 min.)
- Chelsea Walls by Ethan Hawke
- Cyber Palestine by Elia Suleiman (16 min.)
- Ecce homo by Mirjam Kubescha (50 min.)
- Fatma by Khaled Ghorbal
- Hautes Herbes by Mathieu Gérault (26 min.)
- HK by Xavier de Choudens (14 min.)
- Hush! by Ryosuke Hashiguchi
- I nostri anni by Daniele Gaglianone
- Je t'aime John Wayne by Toby MacDonald (10 min.)
- Jeunesse dorée by Zaïda Ghorab-Volta
- The Orphan of Anyang (Ānyáng de gūér) by Wang Chao
- La Trace de Moloktchon by Louis Jammes
- The Crossing (La Traversée) by Sébastien Lifshitz
- Le Système Zsygmondy by Luc Moullet (18 min.)
- Les Pleureuses by Jorane Castro (15 min.)
- Made in the USA by Cindy Babski and Sólveig Anspach
- Stuff and Dough (Marfa si Banii) by Cristi Puiu
- Martha... Martha by Sandrine Veysset
- A Place on Earth by Artur Aristakisyan
- Ming dai ahui zhu by Hsiao Ya-chuan
- On s'embrasse? by Pierre Olivier (6 min.)
- Operai, contadini by Danièle Huillet and Jean-Marie Straub
- Pauline et Paulette by Lieven Debrauwer
- Queenie in Love by Amos Kollek
- Rain by Christine Jeffs
- Riyo by Dominique Gonzalez-Foerster (10 min.)
- Shon by Julien Sallé (15 min.)
- Slogans by Gjergj Xhuvani
- The Deep End by David Siegel and Scott McGehee
- The Heart of the World by Guy Maddin (5 min.)

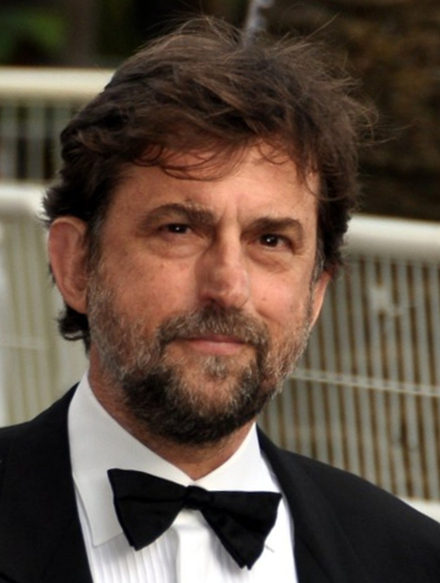
Nanni Moretti, Palme d'Or winner

== Official Awards ==
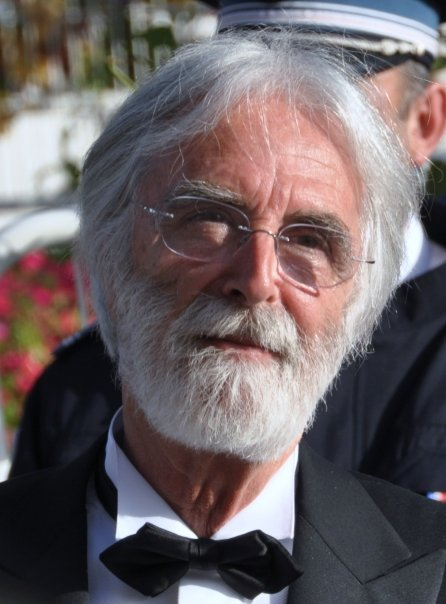
Michael Haneke, Gran Prix winner

=== Main Competition ===
- Palme d'Or: The Son's Room by Nanni Moretti
- Grand Prix: The Piano Teacher by Michael Haneke
- Best Director:
  - David Lynch for Mulholland Dr.
  - Joel Coen for The Man Who Wasn't There
- Best Screenplay: No Man's Land by Danis Tanović
- Best Actress: Isabelle Huppert for The Piano Teacher
- Best Actor: Benoît Magimel for The Piano Teacher

=== Un Certain Regard ===
- Boyhood Loves by Yves Caumon

=== Cinéfondation ===
- First Prize: Portrait by Sergei Luchishin
- Second Prize: Reparation by Jens Jonsson
- Third Prize:
  - Dai Bi by Chao Yang
  - Crow Stone by Alicia Duffy

=== Caméra d'Or ===
- Atanarjuat: The Fast Runner by Zacharias Kunuk

=== Short Film Palme d'Or ===
- Bean Cake by David Greenspan
- Short Film Jury Prize:
  - Daddy's Girl by Irvine Allan
  - Pizza Passionata by Kari Juusonen

== Independent Awards ==
=== FIPRESCI Prizes ===
- The Son's Room by Nanni Moretti (In competition)
- The Pornographer by Bertrand Bonello (International Critics Week)
- Pulse by Kiyoshi Kurosawa (Un Certain Regard)
- Martha... Martha by Sandrine Veysset (Director's Fortnight)

=== Commission Supérieure Technique ===
- Technical Grand Prize: Tu Duu-chih (Sound department) in What Time Is It There? and Millennium Mambo

=== Prize of the Ecumenical Jury ===
- Kandahar by Mohsen Makhmalbaf
  - Special Mention: Pauline and Paulette by Lieven Debrauwer

=== Award of the Youth ===
- French Film: Clément by Emmanuelle Bercot
- Foreign Film: Slogans by Gjergj Xhuvani

=== International Critics' Week ===
- Grand Prix Primagaz: Under the Moonlight by Seyyed Reza Mir-Karimi
- Future talent Award: Unloved by Kunitoshi Manda
- Prix Grand Rail d'Or: Unloved by Kunitoshi Manda
- Prix Petit Rail d'Or: Le dos au mur by Bruno Collet
- Canal+ Award: Eat by Bill Plympton
- Young Critics Award - Best Short: Le dos au mur by Bruno Collet
- Young Critics Award - Best Feature: Bolivia by Adrián Caetano

=== Directors' Fortnight ===
- Media Award 2001 of the European Union: Une liaison pornographique by Frédéric Fonteyne
- SACD Award: On s'embrasse? by Pierre Olivier
- Gras Savoye Award: HK by Xavier De Choudens
- Kodak Short Film Award: Bintou by Fanta Régina Nacro
- Kodak Short Film Award - Special Mention: Le système Zsygmondy by Luc Moullet

=== François Chalais Award ===
- Made in the USA by Sólveig Anspach

== Media ==
- INA: The steps for the opening of the 2001 Festival (commentary in French)
- INA: List of winners of the 2001 Festival (commentary in French)
