= Aurélien Wiik =

French actor and filmmaker (born 1980)

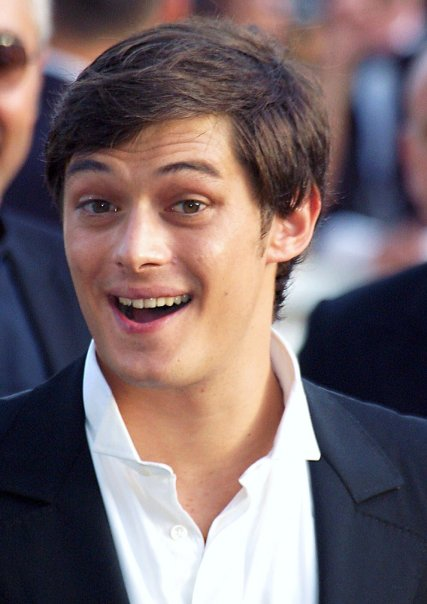
- Aurélien Wiik at Cannes Festival
- Born: 24 September 1980 (age 45); Luc-sur-Mer, France
- Occupations: Actor, Film director, Screenwriter
- Years active: 1994–present

Aurélien Wiik (born 24 September 1980) is a French actor and filmmaker. He is the son of a Norwegian father and of the French actress Françoise Deldick.

== Life and career ==
=== Acting career ===
He made his cinematic acting debut at the age of twelve, playing Antoine in the 1994 film Cache cash, directed by Claude Pinoteau. In 1997, he played "Pierrot" in Roger Hanin's film Soleil, starring Sophia Loren, Philippe Noiret and Marianne Sägebrecht. In 2004, he played Jean Lupin in Arsène Lupin, starring Romain Duris and Kristin Scott Thomas. In 2005, he appeared in four films, including: À travers la forêt, directed by Jean-Paul Civeyrac, and Tu vas rire, mais je te quitte, directed by Philippe Harel. In 2006, he was in Sans Elle, directed by Jean Beaudin.

=== Directing career ===
He made his directorial debut in 2005 with Rue des vertus.

=== Theatre ===
Wiik's debut stage role was in a 1994 production of Henri de Montherlant's play La Ville dont le prince est un enfant (as the boy Serge Souplier), at the Théâtre Hébertot in Paris. In 2003 he was the student Loïc in the popular comedy Les Amazones by Jean-Marie Chevret which had a long run at the Théâtre Rive Gauche in Paris (and also filmed for television), and in 2005 and 2007 he took the title role in the second and third revivals of L'Autre by Florian Zeller staged at the Théâtre des Mathurins, Paris. Then in 2013 he was in the premiere of Mensonges d'états about Operation Fortitude by Xavier Daugreilh, and in a 2018 revival of La Conversation (as Napoléon Bonaparte) by Jean d'Ormesson directed by Alain Sachs.

== Partial filmography ==
- 1993: Arène (Short, director: Nicolas Cuche)
- 1994: Cache cash (director: Claude Pinoteau) - Antoine
- 1997: Soleil (director: Roger Hanin) - Pierrot
- 1999: Belle Maman (director: Gabriel Aghion)
- 1999: Sous-sols (Short, director: Jérôme Le Maire) - Ben
- 2000: In extremis (director: Étienne Faure), Vincent
- 2000: Carla (Short, director: Dramane Sangare) - le chauffeur
- 2001: Chaos (director: Coline Serreau) - Fabrice
- 2002: La Bande du drugstore (director: François Armanet) - Marc Bensoussan
- 2002: Les frères Hélias (Short, director: Frédy Busso) - Nico
- 2002: Parlez-moi d'amour (director: Sophie Marceau) - William
- 2002: A l'abri des regards indiscrets (Short) - the playboy #2
- 2003: Sem Ela (director: Anna da Palma) - Johnny Vieira (French Sans elle...)
- 2004: Ce qu'ils imaginent (director: Anne Théron) - Santiago
- 2004: Tout le plaisir est pour moi (director: Isabelle Broué) - Raoul
- 2004: Arsène Lupin (director: Jean-Paul Salomé) - Jean Lupin
- 2004: Amazon Forever (director: Jean-Pierre Dutilleux) - Nicolas
- 2005: Tu vas rire mais je te quitte (director: Philippe Harel) - Thierry
- 2005: Au petit matin (Short, director: Xavier Gens)
- 2005: À travers la forêt (director: Jean-Paul Civeyrac) - Renaud / Hippolyte
- 2007: Mise à nu (director: Jérémy Halkin)
- 2007: Frontière(s) (director: Xavier Gens) - Alex
- 2008: La tangente (Short, director: Vincent Vesco) - Lui
- 2008: Secret défense (director: Philippe Haim) - Jérémy
- 2008: A Man and His Dog (director: Francis Huster) - Leïla's colleague
- 2009: Des illusions (director: Etienne Faure) - Florent
- 2010: Djinns (directors: Hugues Martin and Sandra Martin) - Vincent
- 2010: Somewhere (director: Sofia Coppola) - French Guy
- 2014: The Vineyard (director: James Katz) - Etiene
- 2014: Blood Sugar Baby (director: Igal Weitzman) - Mirko
- 2015: Our Futures (director: Rémi Bezançon) - Vincent
- 2018: L'incroyable histoire du facteur Cheval (director: Nils Tavernier) - Benjamin Lecoeur

== Television ==
He has as many television as film credits to his name. In 2000, he appeared in the first episode of Scénarios sur la drogue. In 1996, he was in the second episode of Season 5 for Julie Lescaut. In 1995, he played thirteen-year-old Benjamin in Season 1 of La Rivière Espérance.

- 1995: La Rivière Espérance (director: Josée Dayan) - Benjamin à 13 ans
- 1996: Les Feux de la Saint-Jean (director: François Luciani)
- 1999: Tombé du nid (TV Movie, director: Édouard Molinaro) - Max
- 2000: Scénarios sur la drogue (Episode 1, directed by Simon Leloouche) - L'adolescent
- 2005: Les Rois maudits (miniseries) - Edward III of England
- 2008-2009: Myster Mocky présente (Season 2:2, Season 3:1, director: Édouard Molinaro)
- 2019: Le Bazar de la Charité (TV Series, director: Alexandre Laurent) - Jean Rivière
