= Yves Caumon =

French director

- Born: 27 May 1964

Yves Caumon (born 27 May 1964) is a French director. He is Professor in Toulouse's University in France. He worked as assistant-director with Agnès Varda, and Jean-Paul Civeyrac.

He directed several short movies as A la Hache with Valérie Crunchant, Les filles de mon pays (Prix Jean Vigo 2000)...

Yves Caumon is one of the French film directors in the new "New Wave" in French cinema such as Jean-Paul Civeyrac, Philippe Ramos, François Ozon.

His first movie Amour d’enfance was awarded with Prix Un certain regard in the 2001 Cannes Film Festival.

His movie Cache-cache (Hide and seek) was in the French contingent in the 2005 Cannes Film Festival.

== Filmography ==
=== Short Story ===
- 1998 La beauté du monde
- 2000 Les filles de mon pays (prix Jean Vigo)
- 2002 A la hache with Valérie Crunchant

=== Movies ===
- 2001 Amours d’enfance (Prix Un certain regard at the 2001 Cannes Film Festival)
- 2005 Cache-cache (Hide and seek) with Lucia Sanchez (2005 Cannes Film Festival)
- 2011 L'Oiseau (The Bird) with Sandrine Kiberlain

== Awards ==
- Prix Jean Vigo 2000
- Prix un certain regard in 2001 Cannes Film Festival
