= Lucia Sanchez =

Spanish-born French actress

Lucía Sánchez (born 1969) is a Spanish-born French actress. She started her acting career in 1996 with A Summer Dress (A Summer Dress) directed by François Ozon.

She starred in Hide-and-seek directed by Yves Caumon with Bernard Blancan, Les Solitaires directed by Jean-Paul Civeyrac, Who killed Bambi directed by Gilles Marchand. In theater she worked with Renaud Cojo, Michel Dydim, Valérie Crunchant, Christophe Guichet, Laurence de la Fuente and others.

Sanchez is also a film director. She has directed three short movies and two documentaries.

== Filmography ==
=== Actress ===
- 1996 : A Summer Dress directed by François Ozon
- 1998 : Scène de lit directed by François Ozon
- 1998 : Sitcom directed by François Ozon
- 1999 : Un château en Espagne by Delphine Gleize
- 1999 : Les Solitaires directed by Jean-Paul Civeyrac
- 2001 : With All My Love directed by Amalia Escriva
- 2002 : Carnage directed by Delphine Gleize
- 2003 : Red Sunset directed by Edgardo Cozarinsky
- 2003 : My Children's Are Different directed by Denis Dercourt
- 2003 : Who Killed Bambi? directed by Gilles Marchand
- 2005 : Hide-and-seek directed by Yves Caumon
- 2005 : Time Has Come directed by Alain Guiraudie
- 2006 : Sœur Thérèse.com TV Episode, directed by Christophe Douchand
- 2007 : Je suis une amoureuse directed by Jocelyne Desverchère
- 2007 : Décroche directed by Manuel Schapira
- 2007 : Cap Nord directed by Sandrine Rinaldi
- 2009 : The Queen of Hearts directed by Valérie Donzelli
- 2010 : Camping 2 directed by Fabien Onteniente
- 2011 : Itinéraire bis directed by Jean-Luc Perréard
- 2011 : La guerre est déclarée directed by Valérie Donzelli
- 2011 : Dix-sept filles directed by Delphine and Muriel Coulin
- 2012 : Des morceaux de moi directed by Nolwenn Lemesle
- 2012 : Jeunesse directed by Justine Malle
- 2017 : Zombillénium directed by Arthur de Pins and Alexis Ducord
- 2017 : Les Ex directed by Maurice Barthélémy
- 2019 : Je promets d'être sage directed by Ronan Le Page
- 2019 : A Good Doctor directed by Tristan Séguéla
- 2020 : My Donkey, My Lover & I
- 2022 : Annie colère directed by Blandine Lenoir
- 2022 : Le Nouveau Jouet directed by James Huth: Ana Maria
- 2023 : The Crime Is Mine directed by François Ozon

=== Director ===
- 1998 : Les mains de Violeta
- 2000 : Siestes
- 2002 : Las amigas (documentary)
- 2003 : Salomé!!!!
- 2005 : Pick up (documentary)
- 2008 : Profanations: prize from the public at Créteil International Women's Film Festival
- 2010 : Les belles et les bêtes, documentary
- 2011 : La guerre du golf, documentary
- 2012 : Boulevard movie, short film
