= Chems Dahmani =

French actor (born 1986)

- Born: June 16, 1986 (age 39); Paris, France
- Occupation: Actor
- Years active: 1998–2012

Chems Dahmani (born 16 June 1986) is a French actor.

== Filmography ==
- 2011: The Assault
- 2010: From Paris with Love (film)
- 2008: Des Poupées et Des Anges Directed by Nora Hamdi
- 2008: Frontier(s) Directed by Xavier Gens
- 2007: In The Ropes Directed by Magaly-Richard Serrano
- 2001: Cinéma Permanent Directed by Charlotte Silvera

== T.V ==
- 2008: Duval et Moretti "Compte à rebours" Directed by Dennis Berry
- 2007: L'embrasement Directed by Philippe Triboit
- 2006: Madame la Proviseure "Chacun Sa Chance" Directed by Philippe Berenger
- 2005: Sabah Directed by Farid Lozès
- 2004: L’évangile Selon Aimé Directed by André Chandelle
- 2002: Brigade des Mineurs "Tacle Gagnant" Directed by Miguel Courtois
- 2002: Jim la nuit Directed by Bruno Nuytten
- 2001: Commissaire Moulin "Le Petit Bonhomme" Directed by Gérard Marx
- 2000: Police District "Liaison Interdite" Directed by Jean Teddy Philippe
- 2000: Le Combat de Julia Directed by Didier Bivel
- 1999: Le Bahut "Le Testament d’un Professeur" Directed by Arnaud Selignac
