= Estelle Lefébure =

French actress and model (born 1965)

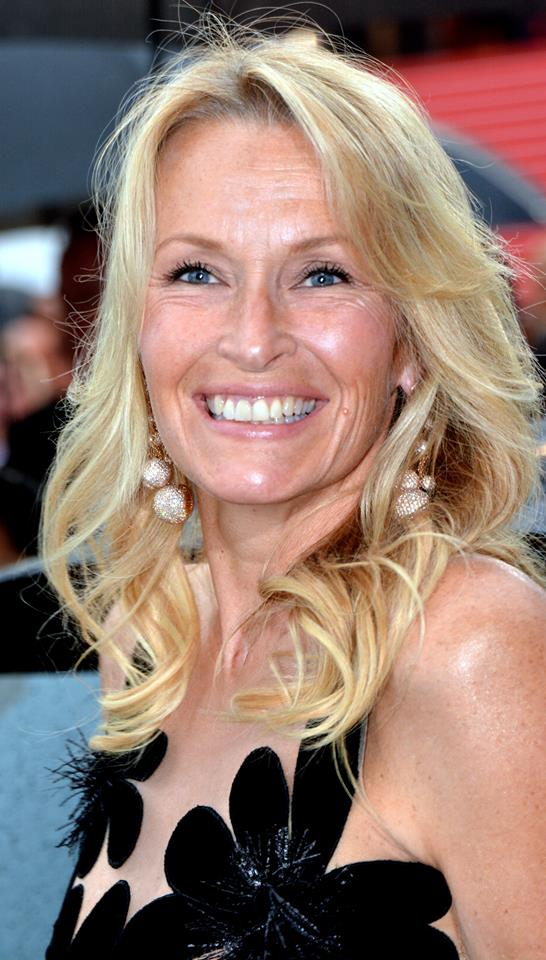
- Lefébure in 2018
- Born: Estelle Lefébure; 11 May 1965 (age 61); Rouen, France
- Occupations: Actress; model
- Spouses: David Hallyday (m. 1989; div. 2001) Arthur (m. 2004; div. 2008)
- Children: 3
- Modeling information
- Height: 1.75 m (5 ft 9 in)
- Hair color: Blonde
- Eye color: Blue
- Agency: Karin Models (Paris); ZZO (Paris); d'management group (Milan)

Estelle Lefébure (French pronunciation: [ɛstɛl ləfebyʁ]; born 11 May 1965) is a French actress and model. She was one of the top fashion models in the 1980s and 1990s. Estelle Lefebure, as she was known in the early 1980s, was discovered by George Gallier and managed by him exclusively at Prestige Models in Paris. George Gallier then moved to New York City to start American Model Management, and managed her career until 1991. Her national recognition was immediate after the first Guess (clothing) campaign shot by Wayne Maser in the early 1980s; she then shot several covers of American Vogue with photographer Richard Avedon, several covers of American Elle with Marc Hispard, Gilles Ben Simon and Bill King. French Elle magazine model editor Odile Saron was also instrumental in helping Estelle's career take off. In 1991, she switched agencies, moving from American Model Management to Elite, moved to California, and married singer David Hallyday. During her marriage with David Hallyday, she was known professionally as Estelle Hallyday.

== Model career ==
She began modeling at age 19. Over the years, she has appeared in advertisements for Guess?, Cartier, Christian Dior, Revlon, Lord & Taylor, and Samsung. In 1988, she first appeared in the Sports Illustrated swimsuit issue. She was featured again in 1989, 1990, and 1993. In 1992 she appeared in the music video "Too Funky" a song written and performed by English singer George Michael and released by Columbia Records in the United States and Epic Records elsewhere. In 1994, she was named one of the "50 most beautiful people" by People. In 1999, she was one of the candidates to become the official model for the French national symbol Marianne but ultimately lost to Laetitia Casta. As of 2022 she is represented by Karin Models Agency in Paris, France.

== Acting career ==
In 1994 she earned her first film role in the French comedy film Grosse Fatigue. In 2001 she portrayed a model for Gaultier in the Gabriel Aghion comedy Absolutely Fabulous and in 2007 she earned her first lead role in the horror film Frontière(s).

== Music career ==
Lefébure sang on the soundtrack of the Comedy Drama Le bal des actrices film, the song "La pomme" and duet with Maïwenn Le Besco.

== Personal life ==
She was married to singer David Hallyday from 15 September 1989 to 2001. The couple had two children: Emma and llona. She was also married to French TV and radio host Arthur from February 2004 to April 2008. Lefébure also has a son, Giuliano, born on 29 November 2010, with her partner Pascal, a restaurateur.

== Filmography ==
Year	Title	Role	Director	Notes
1994	Grosse Fatigue	Estelle Hallyday	Michel Blanc	
2001	Absolument fabuleux	A model	Gabriel Aghion	
2005	Au petit matin	Marie	Xavier Gens	Short
2005	Cavalcade	Chloé	Steve Suissa	
2006	Le juge est une femme	Eva Camus	Eric Summer	TV series (1 Episode : "À coeur perdu")
2007	Chrysalis	Clara	Julien Leclercq	
2007	Frontier(s)	Gilberte	Xavier Gens (2)	
2009	The Ball of the Actresses	Herself	Maïwenn	
2009	Otages	Angèle Garry	Didier Albert	TV movie
2013	Nos chers voisins	Tiffany		TV series (1 Episode : "Nos chers voisins fêtent l'été")
2013	Crossing Lines	Caroline Pelletier	Andy Wilson	TV series (2 episodes)
2013	Mae West	Doctor Consuela	Charles Guérin Surville	Short
