= Days of Glory (2006 film) =

- Poster
- French: Indigènes
- Directed by: Rachid Bouchareb
- Written by: Rachid Bouchareb; Olivier Lorelle
- Produced by: Jean Bréhat; Jacques-Henri Bronckart
- Starring: Jamel Debbouze; Samy Naceri; Sami Bouajila; Roschdy Zem; Bernard Blancan
- Cinematography: Patrick Blossier
- Music by: Armand Amar; Khaled
- Distributed by: Mars Distribution (France); Belga Films (Belgium)
- Release date: May 2006 (Cannes)
- Running time: 123 minutes
- Countries: France; Morocco; Belgium; Algeria
- Languages: Maghrebi Arabic; French
- Budget: $14.5 million
- Box office: $22.5 million

Days of Glory (French: Indigènes, lit. 'Natives'; Arabic: بلديون, romanized: Baladiyyūn) is a 2006 French war film directed by Rachid Bouchareb. The cast includes Sami Bouajila, Jamel Debbouze, Samy Naceri, Roschdy Zem, Mélanie Laurent and Bernard Blancan.

The film explores the contributions of North African soldiers to the Free French Forces during World War II and the discrimination they faced. The film's release contributed to the French government's partial recognition of the pension rights of soldiers from the former French colonial empire.

Cast members Jamel Debbouze, Samy Naceri, Roschdy Zem, Sami Bouajila and Bernard Blancan all won the Cannes Film Festival Award for Best Actor at the 2006 Cannes Film Festival for their performances, and the film won the François Chalais Prize. It was also nominated for the Academy Award for Best Foreign Language Film.

== Plot ==
In French North Africa in 1943, large numbers of men from the colonial empire have been recruited into the French 1st Army of Free France to fight alongside the other Allies against Nazi Germany and liberate occupied France. The army consists mainly of pieds-noirs (European colonists) and indigènes of African descent, including Algerians, Moroccans (known as goumiers), and the Senegalese Tirailleurs.

Saïd, an impoverished goatherd, joins the 7th Algerian Tirailleurs Regiment with other Algerians, including Messaoud, who wants to marry and settle in France, and the literate Corporal Abdelkader, who seeks equality for the indigenous Algerians. Two Moroccans also join, and Yassir's aim is to gain enough war booty so his brother Larbi can afford to marry.

The men train in lend-lease U.S. Army M1943 uniforms under Sergeant Martinez, a battle-hardened pied-noir. They deploy to Italy, where their first mission is to capture a heavily defended mountain. Their French commanding officer is using them as cannon fodder to identify artillery targets and the colonial troops suffer heavy casualties. The colonel tells a French war correspondent, "Today was a great victory for the Free French Forces".

The regiment is embarked for Operation Dragoon to liberate Provence. When a French cook refuses to give tomatoes to indigènes, mutiny is narrowly averted by Martinez and the company captain. Arriving in Marseille, the colonial troops are greeted as heroes. Messaoud meets and courts Irène, a French woman, promising to write and return to her. She promises to wait for him so they can marry.

When Saïd becomes Martinez's orderly, the other soldiers call him 'girlie' and tease him with accusations he's gay. When he snaps and threatens Messaoud at knifepoint, Abdelkader intervenes. Saïd relents, but expresses frustration with their racial segregation. Saïd drinks with Martinez and comments on his family photograph, which reveals that both men have an Arab mother. Martinez threatens to kill him if he reveals that secret.

The colonial troops are denied leave while others in the Free French Forces are allowed furloughs. The colonials are herded into billets and given a ballet performance for entertainment. Bored and disillusioned, they gather outside to discuss the injustice, and a fight starts. The French National Gendarmerie bring Messaoud to a temporary stockade, where Abdelkader, one of the instigators, is also being held. Messaoud is arrested trying to find Irène in Marseille. Abdelkader is brought before the French colonel, who orders him on a special mission to take ammunition to American troops fighting in the Lorraine campaign, where French troops will liberate Alsace. He promises the colonial soldiers will be rewarded if successful.

As they cross the German lines, most of the men are killed by a booby trap, including Yassir's brother, and Martinez is severely injured. The survivors are eager to retreat, but Abdelkader rallies them, and they reach an Alsatian village where they ingratiate themselves with the locals. The arrival of Germans instigates a battle. Messaoud is badly hurt by a Panzerschreck and shot by a German rifleman. Saïd attempts to evacuate Martinez, but both are fatally wounded. Yassir is shot attempting to flee, and just as Abdelkader is cornered, colonial reinforcements arrive and drive the Germans out of the village.

As columns of Free French forces move through, Abdelkader sees the colonel passing in his jeep, but the commanding officer ignores him. A staff officer asks where his unit is. When Abdelkader says they are all dead, he is assigned to another French NCO. He passes a film cameraman filming only white French troops standing by the liberated villagers. The villagers, however, applaud Abdelkader as he leaves.

The story flashes forward to the present, and an elderly Abdelkader visits a war cemetery in Alsace to pay his respects to the graves of his comrades Martinez, Larbi, Saïd, Yassir and Messaoud. He returns to his small, rundown flat in France. The film concludes with a title indicating that, in 1959, war pensions for French colonial veterans living in France were not increased after the Évian Accords established an independent Algeria.

== Cast ==
- Jamel Debbouze - Saïd Otmari
- Samy Naceri - Yassir
- Roschdy Zem - Messaoud Souni
- Sami Bouajila - Abdelkader
- Bernard Blancan - Sergeant Roger Martinez
- Mathieu Simonet - Caporal Leroux
- Assaad Bouab - Larbi
- Mélanie Laurent - Margueritte village Vosges
- Benoît Giros - Captain Durieux
- Thibault de Montalembert - Captain Martin
- Aurélie Eltvedt - Irène
- Dioucounda Koma - Touré
- Philippe Beglia - Rambert
- Antoine Chappey - The colonel
- Kalen Bushe - Second colonel
- Thomas Langmann - The journalist
- Julie de Bona

== Production ==
Filming lasted 18 weeks. Several battle scenes were shot near Ouarzazate and featured soldiers of the Moroccan Army as extras. The film was also shot in studios in Ouarzazate, in Agadir for the boat scenes, and on location in the south of France, including in Beaucaire (Gard) and Tarascon (Bouches-du-Rhône), for the liberation scenes, then in the Vosges and around the Alsace–Lorraine border. The snowy mountain scenes meant to take place in the Vosges were, in reality, filmed in Morocco. In the Vosges, filming took place between the villages of Bains-les-Bains and Fontenoy-le-Château. Filming also took place Faucogney-et-la-Mer, in the Haute-Saône department, where the streets in the village center were covered with sand.

== Modern relevance ==
While each has his own motives, these native Africans have enlisted to fight for a France they have never seen. In the words of Le Chant des Africains the four actors sing within the film, "we come from the colonies to save the motherland, we come from afar to die, we are the men of Africa." The film shows a complex depiction of their treatment in an army organisation prejudiced in favour of the European French.

The discrimination by the French authorities against these soldiers continued as successive French governments froze the war pensions of these indigenous veterans when their countries became independent. The closing credits of the film state that, despite the ruling that war pensions should be paid in full, successive French administrations since 2002 had not done so. It was only after the film's release that the government policy was changed to bring foreign combatant pensions into line with what French veterans are paid. But, as of 2010, no war pension in arrears (almost 40 years) have been considered.

In 2009, the BBC published documentary evidence that showed black colonial soldiers - who together with North African troops made up around two-thirds of Free French forces - were deliberately removed from the units that led the Allied advance to liberate Paris in 1944. General Charles de Gaulle made it clear that he wanted Free French troops to enter the French capital first. In response Allied Command therefore insisted that all black soldiers should be replaced by European and North African ones from other French units.

As historian Julian Jackson elaborated, "Once Vichyite Algeria had been conquered by the Allies, de Gaulle was finally allowed to go there, in May 1943. Now Algiers replaced London and Brazzaville as the capital of the Free French. Even more important was the fact that Algeria contained an important reservoir of North African troops. At the end of 1942 de Gaulle's total forces never numbered more than 50,000, but now, in 1943, thanks to Algeria, he had an army of about half a million men. This multi-racial army was first thrown into battle in Italy in 1943 - it fought at the Battle of Monte Cassino - then landed with Americans in southern France in August 1944... the 2nd Armored Division of Leclerc was sent over to... northern France, - in the words of one senior American general it was, 'the only French division which could be made 100% white'... Even if it was not at de Gaulle's instigation, it doesn't seem he particularly objected to this white-washing of the last stages of the Free French epic... The French were quick to forget that it was thanks to their colonial soldiers that they had any claim to have re-entered the war in 1944 as a great power."

According to French journalist and writer Julie Le Gac, the director allegedly overlooked the tragic incidents of violence in Italy by the goumiers, the Marocchinate, although in one scene their commander, General Juin, gives the troops the right to raid, verbally forbidding them to rage against the female population.

== Reception ==
=== Critical response ===
Days of Glory has an approval rating of 83% on review aggregator website Rotten Tomatoes, based on 88 reviews, and an average rating of 7.30/10. The website's critical consensus states, "Days of Glory is a powerful historical epic that pays homage to a valiant group of soldiers whose sacrifices have largely been forgotten". It also has a score of 82 out of 100 on Metacritic, based on 25 critics, indicating "universal acclaim".

=== Awards ===
- Jamel Debbouze, Samy Naceri, Roschdy Zem, Sami Bouajila and Bernard Blancan won the Prix d'interprétation masculine at the 2006 Cannes Film Festival.
- The film was nominated for the Academy Award for Best Foreign Language Film, but lost to The Lives of Others.

== See also ==
- Army of Africa (Armée d'Afrique)
  - 3rd Algerian Infantry Division (France)
