= Bernard Blancan =

French actor (born 1958)

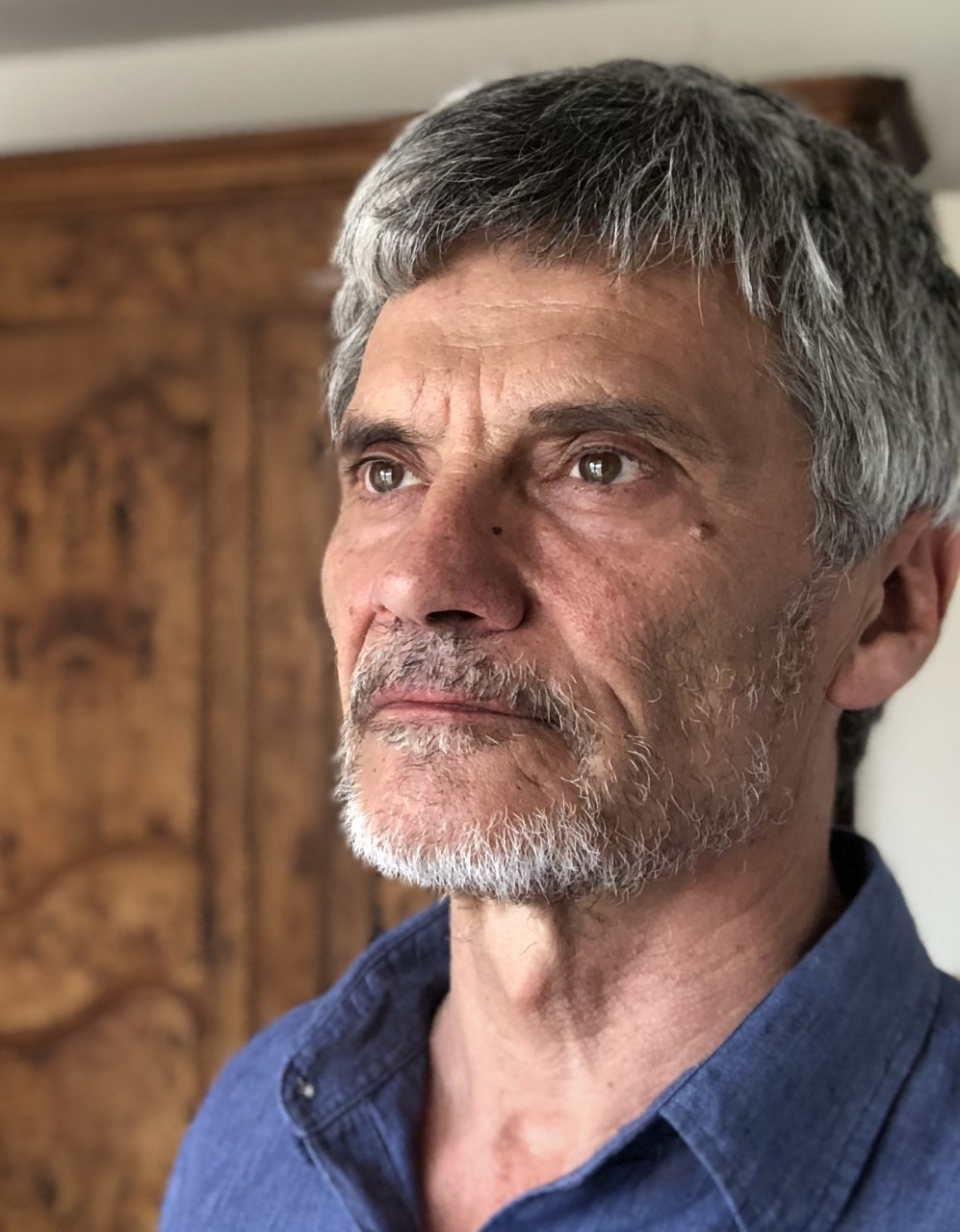
- Born: 9 September 1958 (age 67); Bayonne, France
- Occupation: Actor
- Years active: 1985–present

Bernard Blancan (born 9 September 1958) is a French actor. He has appeared in more than 85 films and television shows since 1989. He shared the award for Best Actor for his role in Days of Glory at the 2006 Cannes Film Festival.

== Filmography ==
=== Actor ===
| Year | Title | Role | Director | Notes |
|---|---|---|---|---|
| 1989 | Antonin | Antonin | Yves Caumon | Short |
| 1989 | A Tale of Two Cities | Patriot at Guillotine | Philippe Monnier | TV Mini-Series |
| 1991 | L'ami de la famille | The man | Yves Caumon | Short |
| 1996 | Le cri de Tarzan | The journalist | Thomas Bardinet | |
| 1998 | Conte philosophique (la caverne) | The man | Philippe Fernandez | Short |
| 1999 | Skin of Man, Heart of Beast | Coco | Hélène Angel | |
| 1999 | Un dérangement considérable | Freddy | Bernard Stora | |
| 1999 | La beauté du monde | Fernand | Yves Caumon | |
| 1999 | Kennedy et moi | Scenes deleted | Sam Karmann | |
| 1999 | Réflexion | The man | Philippe Fernandez | Short |
| 1999 | Les complices | Martineau | Serge Moati | TV movie |
| 2000 | La bicyclette bleue | Langon | Thierry Binisti | TV Mini-Series |
| 2001 | Boyhood Loves | Aimé | Yves Caumon | |
| 2001 | A Moment of Happiness | Edmond | Antoine Santana | |
| 2001 | Chante | The lover | Fabrice Main | Short |
| 2001 | Dérives | Georges | Christophe Lamotte | TV movie |
| 2001 | Campagnes | Pierre | Olivier Langlois | TV movie |
| 2001 | Les semailles et les moissons | Lubin | Christian François | TV Mini-Series |
| 2001 | Boulevard du Palais | The attacker | Frédéric Auburtin | TV series (1 episode) |
| 2001 | La crim' | Eddie Langellier | Denis Amar | TV series (1 episode) |
| 2002 | Le chignon d'Olga | Yves | Jérôme Bonnell | |
| 2002 | Fais-moi des vacances | Father of Lucien & José | Didier Bivel | |
| 2002 | L'étang | Lagache | Jean-Marie Omont | Short |
| 2002 | You'll Get Over It | Swimming Coach | Fabrice Cazeneuve | TV movie |
| 2002 | Passage du bac | Inspector | Olivier Langlois | TV movie |
| 2002 | H | The Guide Michelin Inspector | Frédéric Berthe | TV series (1 episode) |
| 2002 | Avocats & associés | Chavel | Christian Bonnet | TV series (1 episode) |
| 2002 | Juliette Lesage, médecine pour tous | Bernard Louhans | Christian François | TV series (1 episode) |
| 2003 | El juego de Arcibel | Voice | Alberto Lecchi | |
| 2003 | Rencontre avec le dragon | Guillaume's Sergeant | Hélène Angel | |
| 2003 | Le pharmacien de garde | Mathieu | Jean Veber | |
| 2003 | En route mauvaise troupe | Antoine | Camille Bialestowski | Short |
| 2003 | L'instant suivant | The shop owner | Catherine Dalfin | Short |
| 2003 | Ambre a disparu | Dalle | Denys Granier-Deferre | TV movie |
| 2003 | À cran | Fredo | Alain Tasma | TV movie |
| 2003 | Virus au paradis | Serge | Olivier Langlois | TV movie |
| 2003 | Femmes de loi | Machard | Benoît d'Aubert | TV series (1 episode) |
| 2003 | Les Cordier, juge et flic | Monsieur Morange | Michaël Perrotta | TV series (1 episode) |
| 2004 | Look at Me | The server | Agnès Jaoui | |
| 2004 | The Hook | The cop | Thomas Vincent | |
| 2004 | Inguélézi | The accident man | François Dupeyron | |
| 2004 | Alive | The trendy jogger | Frédéric Berthe | |
| 2004 | For intérieur | The father | Patrick Poubel | Short |
| 2004 | L'âge de raison | The father | Myriam Aziza | Short |
| 2004 | Une petite note d'humanité | Thierry | Emmanuel Gras | Short |
| 2004 | Connaissance du monde (drame psychologique) | The archaeologist | Philippe Fernandez | Short |
| 2004 | La nuit du meurtre | The man of the hut | Serge Meynard | TV movie |
| 2005 | Nina's House | Emile | Richard Dembo | |
| 2005 | Quartier V.I.P. | Inmate 1 | Laurent Firode | |
| 2005 | Cache-cache | Raymond | Yves Caumon | |
| 2005 | La ravisseuse | Jacques | Antoine Santana | |
| 2005 | Juste une vache | Vianney | Guy-Marie Lopez | Short |
| 2005 | Franck Keller | Patrick Saurel | Dominique Tabuteau | TV series (1 episode) |
| 2006 | Days of Glory | Sergeant Roger Martinez | Rachid Bouchareb | Cannes Film Festival Award for Best Actor |
| 2006 | Un an | Castel | Laurent Boulanger | |
| 2006 | Tel père telle fille | The father | Sylvie Baillot | Short |
| 2006 | Un jour d'été | The Deputy Mayor | Franck Guérin | TV movie |
| 2006 | Lettres de la mer rouge | Louis le Saint | Emmanuel Caussé & Eric Martin | TV movie |
| 2006 | Le temps de la désobéissance | Bauer | Patrick Volson | TV movie |
| 2006 | La chasse à l'homme (Mesrine) | Abkarian | Arnaud Sélignac | TV movie |
| 2006 | Louis Page | William Bayon | Patrick Poubel | TV series (1 episode) |
| 2006 | Marion Jourdan | Corelli | Jean-Marc Seban | TV series (1 episode) |
| 2007 | Capitaine Achab | Will Adams | Philippe Ramos | |
| 2007 | Tel père telle fille | The father | Sylvie Ballyot | Short |
| 2007 | Résistance aux tremblements | The visitor | Olivier Hems | Short |
| 2007 | Lost Signs | Simon Castaneda | Didier Albert | TV Mini-Series |
| 2007 | Louis la brocante | Valais | Patrick Marty | TV series (1 episode) |
| 2007-08 | P.J. | André Gérard | Thierry Petit & Claire de la Rochefoucauld | TV series (2 episodes) |
| 2008 | Behind the Walls | Yves's father-in-law | Christian Faure | |
| 2008 | Le voyage aux Pyrénées | The guide | Arnaud & Jean-Marie Larrieu | |
| 2008 | Les insoumis | Pierre Wazemme | Claude-Michel Rome | |
| 2008 | Léger tremblement du paysage | The pilot | Philippe Fernandez | |
| 2008 | Dos à dos | Bernard | Camille Bialestowski | Short |
| 2008 | Charlotte Corday | Marat | Henri Helman | TV movie |
| 2008 | Le voyage de la veuve | Thabar | Philippe Laïk | TV movie |
| 2008 | Elles et Moi | Rafael | Bernard Stora | TV Mini-Series |
| 2008 | Chez Maupassant | Father Vallin | Olivier Schatzky | TV series (1 episode) |
| 2008 | Doom-Doom | Dreyfus | Laurent Abitbol & Nicolas Mongin | TV series (3 episodes) |
| 2009 | Leaving | Rémi | Catherine Corsini | |
| 2009 | London River | Forestry worker | Rachid Bouchareb | |
| 2009 | Adieu Gary | Michel | Nassim Amaouche | |
| 2009 | La robe du soir | The principal | Myriam Aziza | |
| 2009 | No pasaran | Bouzigue | Emmanuel Caussé & Eric Martin | |
| 2009 | Cendres | Max | Paul Costes | Short |
| 2009 | Louise Michel | Henri Rochefort | Sólveig Anspach | TV movie |
| 2009 | Au siècle de Maupassant | Monistrol | Claude Chabrol | TV series (1 episode) |
| 2010 | Outside the Law | Colonel Faivre | Rachid Bouchareb | |
| 2010 | Les nuits de Sister Welsh | Henry | Jean-Claude Janer | |
| 2010 | Main basse sur une île | The Lizard | Antoine Santana | TV movie |
| 2011 | The Silence of Joan | The carpenter | Philippe Ramos | |
| 2011 | Suerte | Claude Lucas | Jacques Séchaud | |
| 2011 | Junior | The math teacher | Julia Ducournau | Short |
| 2011 | Mei-Li | Bob | Judith Havas | Short |
| 2011 | Carmen | Vincent | Jacques Malaterre | TV movie |
| 2011 | Quand la guerre sera loin | Ferdinand | Olivier Schatzky | TV movie |
| 2011 | L'été des Lip | Charles Piaget | Dominique Ladoge | TV movie |
| 2011 | Commissaire Magellan | Étienne Crecy | Claire de la Rochefoucauld | TV series (1 episode) |
| 2011 | Flics | Binouze | Thierry Petit | TV series (3 episodes) |
| 2012 | L'enclos du temps | Bernard | Jean-Charles Fitoussi | |
| 2012 | La loi de mon pays | Lucien Grammatico | Dominique Ladoge | TV movie |
| 2013 | Landes | Darrouy | François-Xavier Vives | |
| 2013 | 12 ans d'âge | Philippe | Frédéric Proust | |
| 2013 | Le Weekend | Cop Chiffre | Christopher Granier-Deferre | |
| 2013 | Ogres niais | The old rower | Bernard Blancan | Short |
| 2013 | Le clan des Lanzac | Kroll | Josée Dayan | TV movie |
| 2013 | Les limiers | Inspector Baudrillard | Alain DesRochers | TV series (1 episode) |
| 2013-17 | Un village français | Anselme | Jean-Philippe Amar, Patrice Martineau, ... | TV series (30 episodes) |
| 2014 | The Connection | Lucien Aimé-Blanc | Cédric Jimenez | |
| 2014 | Le maillot jaune | Lucien | Jacques Jousseaume | Short |
| 2015 | Cosmodrama | The reporter | Philippe Fernandez | |
| 2015 | Je suis technologique: Ou pas | Robert | Patrick Pouchin | Short |
| 2015 | Murders at Carcassonne | William Malory | Julien Despaux | TV series (1 episode) |
| 2016 | Vendeur | The doctor | Sylvain Desclous | |
| 2016 | Toril | Jean-Jacques | Laurent Teyssier | |
| 2016 | D'une pierre deux coups | The cop | Fejria Deliba | |
| 2016 | Sur le plancher des vaches | The brother | Fabrice Tempo | |
| 2016 | Nazar Palmus | Lilly's father | Srinath Samarasinghe | |
| 2016 | Hotaru | Bernard | William Laboury | Short |
| 2016 | Après le col d'Ispeguy | The father | Patrick Vuittenez | Short |
| 2016 | Une jeune fille Française | Paul | Guy Gauthier | Short |
| 2017 | 1971 Motorcycle Heart | The journalist | Stéphanie Varela | Short |
| 2017 | Missions | Jeanne's father | Julien Lacombe | TV series (6 episodes) |
| 2018 | Larguées | Guillaume | Eloïse Lang | |
| 2018 | Edmond | The racist client | Alexis Michalik | |
| 2018 | Apollo ou la vie sauvage | Apollo | Léo Favier | Short |

=== Filmmaker ===
| Year | Title | Role | Notes |
|---|---|---|---|
| 1994 | Lartigue expose | Director & writer | Short |
| 2008 | Dos à dos | Composer | Short |
| 2012 | Retour aux sources | Director, writer & Cinematographer | Documentary |
| 2013 | Ogres niais | Director, writer & Composer | Short |

== Theater ==
| Year | Title | Author | Director |
|---|---|---|---|
| 1985-86 | La tête vide | Raymond Guérin | Christian Colin |
| 1988 | Cartoon | Jean-Luc Ollivier | Jean-Luc Ollivier |
| 1989 | L’effet Glapion | Guy Lenoir | Guy Lenoir |
| 1990 | Ça va péter j’te dis | Bernard Blancan & Martine Pont | Bernard Blancan |
| 1990 | La résurrection rouge et blanche de Roméo et Juliette | Sony Lab'ou Tansi | Guy Lenoir |
| 1991 | Blaise Moll de Blaye | Philippe Lespinasse | Philippe Lespinasse |
| 1992 | La nuit prochaine | Yvan Blanloeil | Yvan Blanloeil |
| 1993 | Andromaque | Jean Racine | Yvan Blanloeil |
| 1993 | La péniche s’amuse | Renaud Cojo | Renaud Cojo |
| 1994 | Drame de la vie courante | Pierre Henri Cami | Safy Nebbou |
| 1994 | Papagai Albinos | Marc Vernier | Marc Vernier |
| 1995 | L’expulsé | Samuel Beckett | Bernard Blancan |
| 1996 | La véritable mort de Jeanne d’Arc | Gilbert Tiberghien | Gilbert Tiberghien |
| 1997 | L’amateur de corsets | Oskar Panizza | David Chazam |
| 1997 | Pacific Express | Jean-Luc Ollivier | Jean-Luc Ollivier |
| 1997-98 | Lolicom | Renaud Cojo | Renaud Cojo |
| 1998 | Atrium casino | François Mauget | François Mauget |
| 1998 | Alphonse sèche | David Chazam | David Chazam |
| 2003 | La marche de l’architecte | Daniel Keene | Renaud Cojo |
| 2004 | Criminel | Javier Daulte | Mario Dragunsky |
| 2006 | Scopitone | Bernard Blancan | Bernard Blancan |
| 2007-08 | Bernard Blancan (enfin disponible !) | Bernard Blancan & Renaud Cojo | Renaud Cojo |
| 2017 | Intra Muros | Alexis Michalik | Alexis Michalik |

== Author ==
| Year | Book |
|---|---|
| 2012 | Secrets de sourcier |
| 2012 | Journal d'un comédien |
| 2014 | Si j'étais guérisseur |
| 2015 | Catapulte |
