= Djinns (film) =

- Film poster
- Directed by: Hugues Martin; Sandra Martin
- Written by: Hugues Martin; Sandra Martin
- Produced by: Caroline Adrian; Antoine Rein; Fabrice Goldstein
- Starring: Grégoire Leprince-Ringuet; Aurélien Wiik; Saïd Taghmaoui
- Cinematography: Pierre Cottereau
- Edited by: Nicolas Sarkissian
- Music by: Siegfried Canto
- Production companies: Delante Films; Karé Productions; Agora Films
- Distributed by: SND Films
- Release date: 11 August 2010
- Running time: 96 minutes
- Country: France
- Language: French

Djinns (also known by the title Stranded) is a 2010 French horror film written and directed by Hugues Martin and Sandra Martin, set during the Algerian War in 1960. It stars Saïd Taghmaoui, Cyril Raffaelli and Aurélien Wiik. The film is about a group of French soldiers who are attacked during a rescue mission by a jinn.

== Plot ==
Algeria, 1960. A unit of French paratroopers is sent to search for a missing plane in the desert. The wreckage of the plane is quickly located, but there are no survivors, just a briefcase stamped "defense secret." Assaulted by enemy soldiers of the National Liberation Army, the troops then find refuge in a strange citadel which seems abandoned. Despite the guardian's warnings, they wake up the Djinns, the evil spirits of the desert who kill each other on the patrol.

== Cast ==
- Grégoire Leprince-Ringuet as Michel
- Thierry Frémont as Vacard
- Saïd Taghmaoui as Aroui
- Cyril Raffaelli as Louvier
- Aurélien Wiik as Saria
- Stéphane Debac as Durieux
- Matthias Van Khache as Malovitch
- Grégory Quidel as Max
- Emmanuel Bonami as Ballant
- Omar Lotfi as Kamel
- Raouïa Harand as Daouïa
- Stéphan Wojtowicz
- Karim Saidi as Soldier
- Pierre Troestler as Plane pilot
- Nicolas Carpentier as Secret agent

== Production ==
The French production was shot entirely in Morocco. Nicolas Duvauchelle was originally cast for the project in December 2007 but was replaced by Saïd Taghmaoui as Aroui on 20 January 2009. Djinns was directed and based on a screenplay by Hugues and his wife Sandra. Caroline Adrian, Antoine Rein and Fabrice Goldstein produced for Delante Films.

== Release ==
Djinns was premiered in France on 11 August 2010 and had its French theatrical release on the same day. It was released in the UK in cinemas as Stranded on 31 August 2010. The US release over SND is currently unknown.

== Soundtrack ==
The French electronica musician Siegfried Canto composed the score.

== See also ==
- Red Sands (2009)
