= Bencherif =

Bencherif is the name of several people:

- Adel Bencherif (born 1975), French actor
- Hamza Bencherif (born 1988), footballer
- Ahmed Bencherif (1927–2018), soldier, politician
