= Guillaume et les sortilèges =

Guillaume et les sortilèges is a 2007 French film directed by Pierre Léon.

== Cast ==
- Valérie Crunchant
- Guillaume Verdier
- Laurent Lacotte
- Serge Bozon

== Production credits ==
- Directed by Pierre Léon
- Writing credits : Pierre Léon
