= Chicken (2001 film) =

2001 film by Barry Dignam

- Directed by: Barry Dignam
- Written by: Audrey O'Reilly
- Produced by: Barry Dignam
- Starring: Darren Healy; Niall O'Shea
- Cinematography: Peter Robertson
- Edited by: James Finlan
- Production companies: Hit and Run Productions; Bord Scannán na hÉireann
- Release dates: 1 March 2001 (UK); August 2002 (Ireland)
- Running time: 3 minutes
- Country: Ireland
- Language: English

Chicken is a 2001 Irish short film directed by Barry Dignam about the way adolescent males sometimes redirect their feelings of affection for each other into often violent or competitive activities such as games of chicken.

== Plot ==
Mick (Darren Healy) and Kev (Niall O'Shea) spend a late afternoon near railroad tracks by the seaside where Mick teaches Kev how to "shotgun" beer for reasons then unknown to the viewer. He observes that Kev is "a bit of a wuss" after he fails to replicate the proper shotgunning technique and calls for Kev to come sit close to him for a test of courage, the knife game, which involves stabbing a knife between outstretched fingers at an ever-faster rate. The game is usually played with one person's hand at a time and as a gesture of what may be seen as self-sacrifice, Mick puts his hand over Kev's in order to shield Kev's hand from the brunt of an injury should it occur.

When a train speeds by them, Mick accidentally cuts Kev and himself very slightly with the knife. They clasp each other's hands tightly and Mick, who suddenly seems very insecure and in need of affection is lovingly embraced by Kev, who perhaps has known all along why Mick brought him here.

A single screen of credits appears, then the film ends with a brief shot of the two in silhouette, standing apart, watching the sun set over the ocean.

== Production ==
Chicken was shot over two days on 35 mm film with a Dolby Digital soundtrack.

The title of the short film is a double entendre, since "chicken" is also a slang term for a young homosexual.

== Awards and accolades ==
Film Festival	Category	Year	Outcome
2001 Cannes Film Festival	Short Film Palme d'Or	2001	Nominated
Dublin Gay and Lesbian Film Festival	Best Short Film	2001	Won
Newport International Film Festival	Jury Award for Best Short Film	2001	Won
Barcelona Gay & Lesbian Film Festival	Special Jury Commendation	2001	Won
BFI International London Lesbian & Gay Film Festival	Jury Commendation Film Four TX Short Film Prize	2002	Won
Cabbagetown Film Festival, Toronto	Best Short Film	2002	Won
