= Under Paris =

2024 French action-horror disaster film directed by Xavier Gens

- Promotional release poster
- French: Sous la Seine
- Directed by: Xavier Gens
- Written by: Yannick Dahan; Maud Heywang; Xavier Gens; Yaël Langmann; Olivier Torres Dean Rowell
- Based on: An original idea by Edouard Duprey and Sébastien Auscher
- Produced by: Vincent Roget
- Starring: Bérénice Bejo; Nassim Lyes; Léa Léviant
- Cinematography: Nicolas Massart
- Edited by: Riwanon Le Beller
- Music by: Anthony D'Amario; Alex Cortés; Edouard Rigaudiére
- Production company: Let Me Be
- Distributed by: Netflix
- Release date: 5 June 2024
- Running time: 101 minutes
- Country: France
- Language: French
- Budget: €19.6 million; (≈$20.9 million)

Under Paris (French: Sous la Seine) is a 2024 French action-horror disaster film directed by Xavier Gens, who co-wrote it with Yannick Dahan, Maud Heywang, Yaël Langmann and Olivier Torres. It stars Bérénice Bejo as a grieving marine biologist who is forced to face her tragic past in order to save Paris from a bloodbath when a giant shark appears in the Seine.

Produced on a budget of €19.6 million, the film was released by Netflix on 5 June 2024, and received mixed-to-positive reviews.

== Plot ==
Near the Great Pacific Garbage Patch, marine researcher Sophia Assalas and her team search for Lilith, a tagged shortfin mako shark. Her husband Chris leads a dive team of Sam, Juan and Tom, leaving Sophia and Jade onboard. The team first observe an unusual sight of makos hunting in a pack, before they locate Lilith, who has grown much larger since she was last sighted. With the shark appearing non-aggressive, Chris attempts to take a blood sample from Lilith, but the shark suddenly snaps and kills him, Sam, Juan and Tom. Leaving the safety of the boat, Sophia goes after Lilith, but becomes entangled in a net and dragged far beneath the surface as the shark escapes into the depths. She manages to free herself, but not before suffering injuries due to the severe change in pressure.

Three years later, Sophia works at an aquarium in Paris. Environmentalists Mika and Ben inform Sophia that Lilith's tracking beacon is still active and that she has travelled from the Pacific and up the River Seine and is seemingly trapped in the city. After a man is found dead with wounds from shark bites, police diver Adil recruits Sophia to help find and kill the shark. Before they can do so, the beacon is switched off by Mika and Ben in the hope that they can rescue the animal later.

Sophia and Adil petition the Mayor of Paris to postpone the upcoming triathlon. The mayor refuses, emphasizing the event's importance for focusing global attention on Paris during the run-up to the Olympic Games, on which billions of euros have already been spent. Mika reveals Lilith's existence to the public, and leads a group of supporters into the city's catacombs, where the city's wastewater reservoirs are, to find her. Ben tells Sophia of Mika's plan, and she and Adil's team head down into the catacombs to find them after reactivating Lilith's beacon.

Mika activates a pulse to lure Lilith to where her group have convened, and swims out to the middle of the reservoir. Adil's team arrives just as Lilith appears with a juvenile shark, Lilith's offspring. Mika does not heed to their warnings to leave the water, and after she pets the juvenile shark, Lilith attacks and kills her, causing a mass panic that leads to many injuries and twelve deaths, including Ben and Leopold, a police officer on Adil's team. In the aftermath Sophia and Adil find the juvenile shark dead, and after examining it they discover that it's a female that mutated to adapt to fresh water and became pregnant through parthenogenesis, like Lilith. Sophia concludes that if Lilith is not caught, she may give birth to more mutated offspring. The Mayor, deflecting blame from herself, orders them to kill the shark, and still refuses to cancel the triathlon to be held in the river the following day. She takes part in a TV interview downplaying the danger the sharks present.

Sophia and Adil devise a plan to lure Lilith out of the catacombs and blow her up with the help of explosives experts Poiccard and Berruti. As the mayor declares the triathlon open, and swimmers take to the water, Adil's team Caro, Adama, Angèle and Markus begin to execute the plan. Underwater, Sophia and Adil encounter a large school of juvenile sharks as they set up their trap. The sharks kill Poiccard, Berruti and Adama before Adil sets the explosives off, seemingly killing the school of young sharks and leaving the gigantic Lilith as the only survivor. She capsizes the police boat, killing Caro and Markus, and she heads towards the triathlon. The mayor and the spectators look on in horror as several swimmers are attacked and killed. The military open fire on Lilith, despite warnings from Adil that there are live shells on the riverbed. The disturbance in the water from their gunfire and Lilith's movements causes unexploded ordnance at the bottom of the river to shift and detonate, throwing the Mayor, Angèle, and many spectators into the water. The resulting chain reaction of explosions destroys several bridges and creates a tsunami that entirely floods the center of Paris. Sophia and Adil are left stranded on the roof of a building in the middle of the flood, surrounded by Lilith and the juvenile sharks that have survived the explosions.

As the end credits suggest, Lilith and her offspring have proliferated in the major river cities of the world (Paris, London, New York, Bangkok, Venice and Tokyo), and seem to have, as Sophia feared, colonised the entire world.

== Cast ==
- Bérénice Bejo as Sophia
- Nassim Lyes as Adil
- Léa Léviant as Mika
- Sandra Parfait as Caro
- Aksel Ustun as Nils
- Aurélia Petit as Angèle
- Marvin Dubart as Markus
- Daouda Keita as Leopold
- Ibrahima Ba as Adama
- Anne Marivin as the Mayor of Paris
- Stéphane Jacquot as Poiccard
- Jean-Marc Bellu as Berruti
- Nagisa Morimoto as Ben
- Yannick Choirat as Chris
- Iñaki Lartigue as Juan
- Victor Pontecorvo as Sam
- Thomas Espinera as Tom
- Anaïs Parello as Jade
- Iván González as André
- Patrick Ligardes as the Prefect of Paris
- Maud Forget as a sports journalist
- Jonas Dinal as Adewale
- Hugo Trophardy as Victor
- Yves Calvi as himself
- Ricky Tribord as the Marine officer
- Monsieur Poulpe as a triathlon swimmer

The role of the Mayor of Paris is thought to be inspired by French politicians Valérie Pécresse and Anne Hidalgo. TV presentator Yann Barthès has asked actress Bérénice Bejo regarding their reactions, to which Bérénice Bejo replied: "So I've met Anne Hidalgo about two or three days ago. She wanted to come to the first screening but couldn't make it... Frankly, she found it hilarious. She was rather very positive about the film, and asked me 'Why is this mayor not listening? Why is she mean and refusing to acknowledge the importance of the threat?'. I told her 'Come on, Anne, it's about the money ! You know how expensive the Olympic Games are!'".

== Release ==
The film was released on Netflix on 5 June 2024. By the end of June, the film amassed 84 million views, making it the fourth most-watched Netflix film for the first half of 2024.

The release occurred the same month as the 2024 Summer Olympics held in Paris. The movie's Mayor insisting on the triathlon athletes swimming in the Seine appears to be a reference to French President Emmanuel Macron and Paris Mayor Anne Hidalgo guaranteeing that the Seine would be safe to swim in, against rising scientists' warnings at the time.

== Reception ==
=== Critical response ===
On the review aggregator website Rotten Tomatoes, 64% of 42 critics' reviews are positive, with an average rating of 5.9/10. The website's consensus reads: "Marrying environmental themes with bloody thrills, this Gallic entry into the shark attack canon ultimately lands on the right side of ridiculous fun." Metacritic, which uses a weighted average, assigned the film a score of 57 out of 100, based on 6 critics, indicating "mixed or average" reviews.

=== Ratings ===
The film achieved the number one position on Netflix in the top ten of the most viewed films worldwide on the streaming service. In the first week, the film was viewed more than 40 million times.

== Sequel ==
In November 2024 it was revealed that a sequel was in development. In February 2026, it was announced that Alexandre Aja would direct the sequel, with Bejo confirmed to return. In May 2026, production was reported to have begun in France.
