= Through the Forest (film) =

2005 French film

- Film poster
- French: À travers la forêt
- Directed by: Jean-Paul Civeyrac
- Written by: Jean-Paul Civeyrac
- Starring: Camille Berthomier; Aurélien Wiik
- Cinematography: Céline Bozon
- Music by: John Cage; Antonín Dvořák; Camille Berthomier
- Production company: Les films Pelléas
- Release date: 2 July 2005 (Paris Cinéma)
- Running time: 65 minutes
- Country: France
- Language: French

Through the Forest (French: À travers la forêt) is a 2005 French film directed by Jean-Paul Civeyrac.

== Plot ==
Film screenshot

After a motorcycle accident, Renaud dies. His girlfriend Armelle can't forget him. Her sisters suggest she could go to a medium for help. Through this medium, Armelle encounters Hyppolite, who looks exactly like Renaud.

== Cast ==
- Camille Berthomier as Armelle
- Aurelien Wiik as Hippolyte/ Renaud
- Morgane Hainaux as Roxane
- Alice Dubuisson as Bérénice
- Mireille Roussel as the medium
- Valérie Crunchant as medium's assistant

== Release ==
- July 2005 in Festival Paris Cinéma
- September 2005 in Toronto International Film Festival
- 12 October 2005 France
- 22 October 2005 in London Film Festival
