= The Silence of Joan =

- Film poster
- French: Jeanne captive
- Directed by: Philippe Ramos
- Written by: Philippe Ramos
- Produced by: Sophie Dulac; Michel Zana
- Starring: Clémence Poésy; Thierry Frémont; Liam Cunningham; Mathieu Amalric
- Cinematography: Philippe Ramos
- Edited by: Philippe Ramos
- Production companies: Sophie Dulac Productions; Echo Films
- Distributed by: Sophie Dulac Distribution
- Release date: 16 November 2011
- Running time: 92 minutes
- Country: France
- Language: French

The Silence of Joan (French: Jeanne captive) is a 2011 French historical film directed by Philippe Ramos and starring Clémence Poésy, Thierry Frémont and Liam Cunningham. The film was screened in the Directors' Fortnight at the 2011 Cannes Film Festival.

== Plot ==
The film depicts the period between Joan of Arc's capture and her execution in 1431.

== Cast ==
- Clémence Poésy as Jeanne d'Arc
- Thierry Frémont as The healer
- Liam Cunningham as English Captain
- Mathieu Amalric as The preacher
- Louis-Do de Lencquesaing as Jean de Luxembourg
- Jean-François Stévenin as The monk
- Johan Leysen as The commander of the guard
- Bernard Blancan as The carpenter

== See also ==
- The Passion of Joan of Arc, 1928 film
- Cultural depictions of Joan of Arc
