= Fortune Express =

1991 film

- Directed by: Olivier Schatzky
- Written by: Olivier Schatzky; Pierre Jolivet
- Produced by: Marie-France Trémège
- Starring: Thierry Frémont
- Cinematography: Carlo Varini
- Edited by: Jean-François Naudon
- Music by: Serge Perathoner; Jannick Top
- Distributed by: Altair Films
- Release date: 24 April 1991
- Running time: 90 minutes
- Country: France
- Language: French

Fortune Express is a 1991 French drama film directed by Olivier Schatzky. It was entered into the 41st Berlin International Film Festival.

== Cast ==
- Thierry Frémont as Gadouille
- Cris Campion as Pascal Perkiss
- Hervé Laudière as Marko
- Luc Bernard as Chiffre N°1
- Christian Bouillette as Bobo
- Valeria Bruni Tedeschi as Corinne
- Richard Bean as L'optimiste
- Thierry Ravel as Bichon
- Arno Chevrier as Chiffre N°4
- Hervé Langlois as Chiffre N°5
- Vincent de Bouard as Chiffre barman
- Jean O'Cottrell as Le directeur de la banque
- Isabelle Petit-Jacques as L'employée de la banque
- Pascal De Toffoli as L'extatique
