= A Ferret Called Mickey =

- Directed by: Barry Dignam
- Written by: Loughlin Deegan
- Produced by: Siobhán Bourke
- Starring: Colin Middleton; Darragh Kelly; Cathy Belton; Emily Bradley; Pat Laffan
- Cinematography: Russel Gleeson
- Edited by: Dermot Diskin
- Music by: Gregory Magee
- Production companies: Bord Scannán na hÉireann; RTÉ; Rough Magic Films
- Release date: 2003
- Running time: 10 minutes
- Country: Ireland
- Language: English

A Ferret Called Mickey is a 2003 Irish short film directed by Barry Dignam about a father who tries to get his young son involved in more "manly" pursuits (such as rabbit hunting) by getting him a ferret.

== Plot ==
Paulie is having a pretend tea party with his sister and his doll in the garden while his father and mother watch from inside the house. Paulie's father, Jim, is annoyed that his son is wearing his mother's dress and takes him to Dougie O'Neill to buy a ferret so that they can go rabbit hunting. Paulie picks a ferret and calls him "Mickey".

Jim takes his son into the countryside in the rain to find a rabbit burrow. Jim tells Paulie to release the ferret who scares the rabbits out of the burrow and into a net where he hits them with a shovel. Paulie is upset when he learns that the true meaning of hunting is to "kill bunnie rabbits". They arrive home with a table full of dead rabbits, to which Jim's wife complains what she is to do with them. He tells her to make rabbit stew. When Jim goes to the shed, Paulie tells him that he fed Mickey éclairs so he isn't hungry anymore and so won't have to kill any more rabbits.

At dinner, Paulie refuses to eat the rabbit meat and runs out to the shed. When Jim confronts Paulie he tells him to put Mickey back in his cage and go finish his food; but Paulie refuses and tells him to do it himself while holding the ferret up to him. Jim is actually scared of handling Mickey and backs up knocking some petrol cans over, causing the ferret to bite Paulie on the lip.

While returning the ferret to Dougie O'Neill, Jim realises that he was the one that lost his nerve with the ferret and it was his intolerance that caused Paulie to getting injured.

Back in the garden, Paulie is upset about losing Mickey when Jim sits beside him and invites him on a fishing trip. When Paulie declines, he says "You'll need this then, I suppose..." and hands him his doll, and the two sit together and have a pretend tea party.
