= The Assault (2010 film) =

Film by Julien Leclercq

- Theatrical release poster
- French: L'Assaut
- Directed by: Julien Leclercq
- Screenplay by: Simon Moutaïrou; Julien Leclercq
- Based on: L'Assaut : GIGN, Marignane, 26 décembre 1994, 17 h 12 by: Roland Môntins; Gilles Cauture
- Produced by: Julien Leclercq; Julien Madon
- Starring: Vincent Elbaz; Grégori Derangère; Mélanie Bernier; Aymen Saïdi; Marie Guillard; Chems Dahmani; Djanis Bouzyani; Mohid Abid; Antoine Basler
- Cinematography: Thierry Pouget
- Edited by: Mickael Dumontier; Christine Lucas Navarro; Frédéric Thoraval
- Music by: Jean-Jacques Hertz; François Roy
- Production companies: Labyrinthe Films; Mars Films
- Distributed by: Mars Distribution
- Release dates: 12 November 2010 (Sarlat Film Festival); 9 March 2011 (France)
- Running time: 95 minutes
- Country: France
- Language: French
- Budget: €4 million
- Box office: $4.3 million

The Assault (French: L'Assaut) is a 2010 French action thriller film directed by Julien Leclercq, based on the 1994 hijacking of Air France Flight 8969 by Armed Islamic Group of Algeria and the raid to free the hostages by the GIGN, the elite counter-terrorism unit of the French National Gendarmerie.

== Cast ==
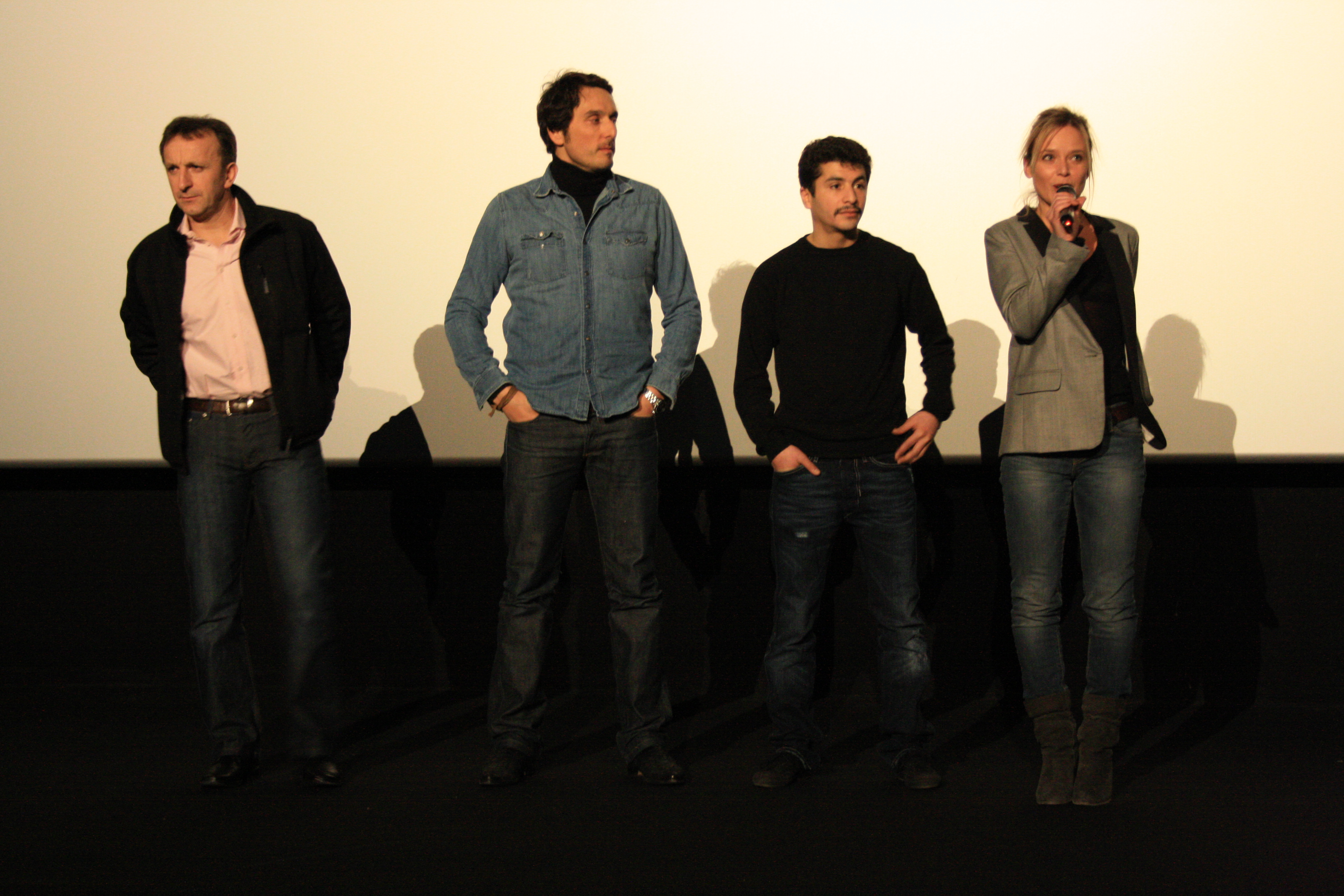
The cast at the premiere of the film in Montigny-le-Bretonneux, France

- Vincent Elbaz as Thierry Prungnaud
- Grégori Derangère as Commander Denis Favier
- Mélanie Bernier as Carole Jeanton
- Aymen Saïdi as Yahia
- Chems Dahmani as Mustapha
- Djanis Bouzyani as Salim
- Marie Guillard as Claire Prungnaud
- Naturel Le Ruyet as Emma
- Philippe Bas as Didier
- Antoine Basler as Solignac
- Philippe Cura as Roland Môntins
- Mohid Abid as Makhlouf
- Fatima Adoum as Djida
- Hugo Becker as Vincent Leroy
- Abdelhafid Metalsi as Ali Touchent
- Claire Chazal as News presenter

== Reception ==
As of June 2020, review aggregation website Rotten Tomatoes reported an approval rating of 53%, based on 145 reviews, with an average score of 5.86/10. At Metacritic, which assigns a normalized rating out of 100 to reviews from mainstream critics, the film received an average score of 55, based on 7 reviews, indicating "mixed or average reviews".
