= Frontier(s) =

- Original theatrical poster
- Directed by: Xavier Gens
- Written by: Xavier Gens
- Produced by: Laurent Tolleron
- Starring: Karina Testa; Aurélien Wiik; Samuel Le Bihan; Estelle Lefébure
- Cinematography: Laurent Barès
- Edited by: Carlo Rizzo
- Music by: Jean-Pierre Taieb
- Production companies: BR Films; Cartel Productions; Chemin Vert; Pacific Films
- Distributed by: EuropaCorp
- Release dates: 1 July 2007 (Agde Film Festival); 23 January 2008 (France)
- Running time: 108 minutes
- Countries: France; Switzerland
- Languages: French; German
- Budget: $3 million

Frontier(s) (French: Frontière(s)) is a 2007 French-Swiss independent horror film written and directed by Xavier Gens in his feature length debut and stars Karina Testa, Aurélien Wiik, Estelle Lefébure, and Samuel Le Bihan. It follows a group of young criminals from Paris who lodge at a countryside inn run by neo-Nazis in the aftermath of riots spurred by a controversial presidential election.

After its premiere in France at the Agde Film Festival in 2007, the film was given a limited release in the United States on 9 May 2008 as part of the After Dark Horrorfest.

== Plot ==
A far-right candidate reaches the second round of the election for the French presidency, sparking riots in Paris. Hoping to escape Paris but needing cash, a street gang made up of Muslim Arab youths (Alex, Tom, Farid, the pregnant Yasmine, and her brother Sami) take advantage of the chaos to pull off a robbery. Sami is shot, and the group splits up: Alex and Yasmine take Sami to a hospital, and Tom and Farid take the money to a family-run inn near the border. Innkeepers Gilberte and Klaudia claim their rooms are free and seduce the two men.

At the hospital, the E.R. staff reports Sami's injury to the police. Sami insists that Yasmine run before the police catch her. His dying wish is that Yasmine not have an abortion. Alex and Yasmine flee, leaving the fatally wounded Sami behind. Alex and Yasmine phone their friends for directions to the inn. Tom and Farid give them directions, but soon after are brutally attacked by Gilberte, Klaudia, and Goetz. When Tom and Farid try to escape, Goetz runs their car off a cliff. The injured men wander into a mine shaft, where Tom is quickly recaptured. Farid must fend for himself with the family's rejected children in the mine. Unaware of the danger, Alex and Yasmine arrive at the inn and are captured by the family.

Alex and Yasmine are chained in a pigpen. Alex breaks Yasmine's chains, allowing her to escape. When the captors discover Yasmine's escape, the family patriarch, Von Geisler, cuts Alex's Achilles tendons. Meanwhile, in the mine, Farid finds the victims' storage area. The family realizes something is amiss, and Hans chases Farid into a boiler, where Farid is cooked alive. Yasmine flees from the inn but is quickly picked up by Goetz. Back in the pigpen, Von Geisler personally grants Alex's last wish to be put down quickly. Initially, Von Geisler wishes for Karl to "wed" Yasmine to carry on the family lineage, but when Von Geisler learns she is already pregnant, he entrusts her to the meek Eva, who tells Yasmine that she came to the family in a very similar manner and that she is obedient because the family promised her that her parents would return for her someday. Eva also tells Yasmine of the rejected homeless children she and Hans care for in the mine.

Eventually, Eva leads Yasmine down to dinner, where the family awaits her. Von Geisler is revealed to be a former (and still practicing) Nazi who's lived at the inn since the end of WWII. Von Geisler offers up a toast to the new blood, and Yasmine quickly grabs a knife and takes Von Geisler hostage. Hans grabs a shotgun and shoots Von Geisler in the confusion; Karl shoots Hans dead in turn. Yasmine escapes and is chased by Karl and Goetz into the mine. Yasmine makes her way into one of the body storage rooms, where she fights with Goetz. After a bloody struggle, she repeatedly hits him with an axe before impaling him on a table saw. Karl catches Yasmine as she tries to return to the surface, but Eva comes to the rescue, blowing off Karl's head with a shotgun. Yasmine searches for car keys to escape, but is ambushed by Gilberte and Klaudia bearing SMGs. Yasmine hits a gas tank during the shootout, blowing up the room. Gilberte survives the explosion and attempts to kill Yasmine, only to have her throat torn out by her. With everyone else in the neo-Nazi family dead, Yasmine tries to persuade Eva to leave with her, but Eva stays to take care of the children in the mine.

On the radio, one hears that the far-right candidate in the election has won the second round, thus becoming the new French President. Yasmine runs into a police blockade near the border, where she surrenders to the authorities.

== Cast ==
- Karina Testa as Yasmine
- Estelle Lefébure as Gilberte
- Aurélien Wiik as Alex
- Samuel Le Bihan as Goetz
- David Saracino as Tom
- Chems Dahmani as Farid
- Adel Bencherif as Sami
- Maud Forget as Eva
- Amélie Daure as Klaudia
- Rosine Favey as The mother
- Joël Lefrançois as Hans
- Patrick Ligardes as Karl
- Jean-Pierre Jorris as Von Geisler

== Release ==
Frontier(s) was intended to be one of the 8 Films to Die For at Horrorfest 2007, but when the MPAA gave the film an NC-17 rating, it was instead released unrated to ten US theaters for one weekend, grossing $9,913. It was released on DVD the following week. Frontière(s) was released in France on 23 January 2008.

== Reception ==
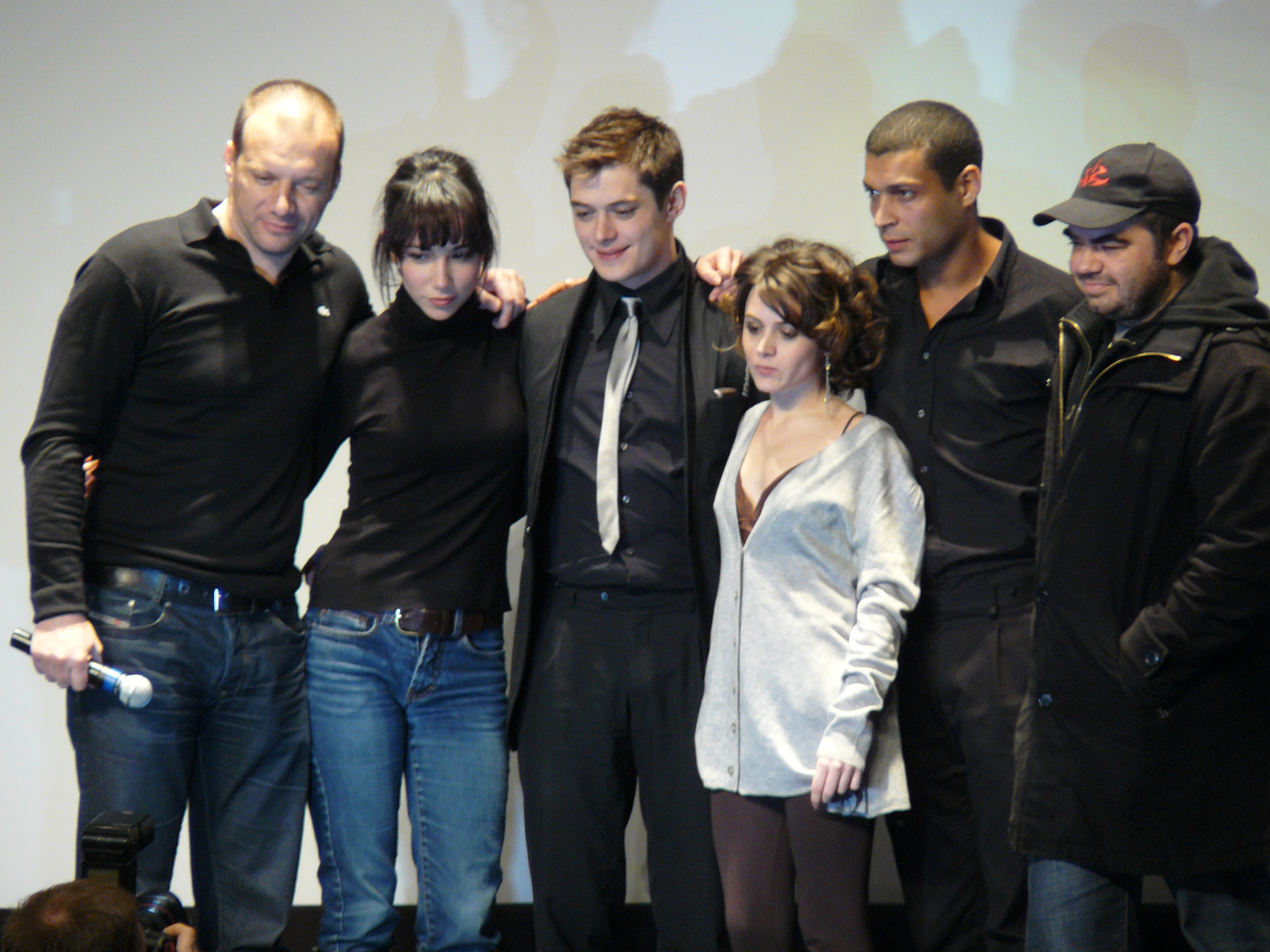
Frontier(s)'s crew at Fantastic'Arts 2008 festival

Manohla Dargis of The New York Times praised the film, writing: "There’s enough blood in the unrated French horror film Frontier(s) to satiate even the most ravenous gore hounds. The real surprise here is that this creepy, contemporary gross-out also has some ideas, visual and otherwise, wedged among its sanguineous drips, swaying meat hooks and whirring table saw." Peter Bradshaw of The Guardian awarded the film two out of five stars, calling it "One for hardcore fans only." Writing for The Village Voice, Jim Ridley noted: "Ah, the triumph of globalization: Give the French a taste of neo-fascism, race riots, and paramilitary crackdowns, and they seek solace in the American cinema’s current favorite pastime—vigorously art-directed torture porn."

John Anderson of Variety compared the film to Hostel (2005) and Saw (2004), adding: "Frontier(s) is a 100-minute hemorrhage that doesn't bring anything to the operating table of torture-porn but more gore, cruelty and misery. Which for some, of course, may be enough."

Scott Tobias of The A.V. Club gave the film a "C", saying: "Comparisons to The Texas Chainsaw Massacre, Hostel, The Descent, and the long tradition of "last woman standing" slasher films are unavoidable, but Gens doesn't seem as interested in originality as he does in trying to outdo his influences."

Internet film review aggregator Rotten Tomatoes reported an approval rating of 64%, based on 22 reviews, with a rating average of 6.20/10. The site's critical consensus reads, "Perhaps slapdash with its aspirations toward message-making, this ultra-gory horror flick nonetheless delivers the bloody goods". Metacritic reported the film had an average score of 44 out of 100, based on 5 reviews.

== Critical analysis ==
Frontier(s) has been cited by film scholars as an example of the New French Extremity, horror films produced in France which depict visceral horror and extreme violence. Alexandra West notes that Frontier(s) is "about the evolution of the extreme right in France," and that it explores the "untended elements of society, the sections which are allowed to remain in realities that no longer exist in urban settings."
