= Festival Paris Cinéma =

Annual French film festival

Coordinates: 48°51′24″N 2°21′8″E

The Festival Paris Cinéma is one of the most recent French movie festivals, started in 2003. It is held annually in July. It was launched in 2003 after the municipal government withdrew funding for Festival du Film de Paris.

== 2003 Edition ==
- Tribute to Terry Gilliam
- Eliseo Subiela retrospective
- Post Cannes: "Shara" (Naomi Kawase), "Uzak" (Nuri Bilge Ceylan), "Les Egares" (Andre Techine)
- "Qui a tué Bambi?", directed by Gilles Marchand
- Michelangelo Antonioni retrospective
- Tribute to Leslie Cheung
- Docus Dements: "Lost in La Mancha" (Fulton/Pepe), "Comandante" (Oliver Stone), "Soy Cuba" (Mikhail Kalatozov)

== Films in Competition 2005 ==
- À travers la forêt, directed by Jean-Paul Civeyrac
- Adam & Paul, directed by Lenny Abrahamson
- And Thereafter, directed by Hosup Lee
- Beautiful City (Shahre Ziba), directed by Asghar Farhadi
- El Perro negro (Histoires de la guerre civile espagnole), directed by Péter Forgács
- Home Sweet Home, directed by Nils De Coster
- How the Garcia Girls Spent their Summer, directed by Georgina Garcia Riedel
- Odessa Odessa..., directed by Michale Boganim
- Pour les vivants et les morts (Eläville ja kuolleille), directed by Kari Paljakka
- Pour un seul de mes deux yeux (Nekam achat mishtey eynay), directed by Avi Mograbi
- Le Rivage des murmures (A costa dos murmurios), directed by Margarida Cardoso
- Ronde de nuit (Ronda nocturna), directed by Edgardo Cozarinsky
- Silenzio, directed by Christian Merlhiot
- Le Soleil (Solnze), directed by Alexander Sokurov
- The Night is Bright, directed by Roman Balayan
- This Charming Girl (Yeoja, Jeong-hae), directed by Lee Yoon-ki
- Un silenzio particolare, directed by Stefano Rulli
- Voici venu le temps, directed by Alain Guiraudie
- Watermarks directed by Yaron Zilberman
- Yesterday, directed by Darrell James Roodt
