= Boyhood Loves =

2001 film

- A poster bearing the film's French title:Amour d'enfance
- French: Amour d'enfance
- Directed by: Yves Caumon
- Written by: Yves Caumon
- Produced by: Bertrand Gore
- Starring: Mathieu Amalric
- Cinematography: Julien Hirsch
- Edited by: Sylvie Fauthoux
- Release date: 21 November 2001
- Running time: 102 minutes
- Country: France
- Language: French

Boyhood Loves (French: Amour d'enfance) is a 2001 French drama film directed by Yves Caumon. It was the director's first feature film. It was screened in the Un Certain Regard section at the 2001 Cannes Film Festival, where it won the Un Certain Regard Award.

== Plot ==
Paul is still a student at 28 years old, often visiting his family farm. This time he goes home because his father is dying. Once there, Paul finds himself trapped: he feels guilty for having abandoned his family. He tries to make up for with generous and altruistic actions.

== Cast ==
- Mathieu Amalric as Paul
- Lauryl Brossier as Odile
- Fabrice Cals as Thierry
- Michèle Gary as Odette
- Roger Souza as Paul's father
- Bernard Blancan as Aimé
- Nicole Miana as Odile's mother
- Frédéric Bonpart as Jean-Marie
- Paul Crouzet as Auguste
- Deddy Dugay as Suzette
