= Shadow (2009 Italian film) =

- Directed by: Federico Zampaglione
- Starring: Jake Muxworthy; Karina Testa
- Release date: 29 August 2009 (FF)
- Running time: 1h 17min
- Country: Italy
- Language: English

Shadow is a 2009 Italian horror film directed by Federico Zampaglione and starring Jake Muxworthy and Karina Testa.

== Plot ==
Soldier David missed biking while serving in Iraq. Finally at liberty, he bicycles in Europe, heading to Shadow when he stops at a bar and meets the beautiful Angeline. Troublemaker hunters Fred and Buck bother Angeline, so David and the bar owner defend her. As David later camps in the woods, the wind carries away his tent, so Angeline invites him to share hers. As they ride their bicycles together and enjoy the wilderness the next day, they again cross paths with Fred and Buck, who chase the couple with their truck, threatening their lives. The quartet all suffer accidents and end up having to walk through the woods. Soon they are captured by a strange man who lives in an isolated house and tortures the men in his basement. David manages to escape and helps the hunters to leave the place, but the freak hunts them down. David next awakens to a reality that's worse than his nightmare.

== Cast ==
- Jake Muxworthy as David
- Karina Testa as Angeline
- Ottaviano Blitch as Fred
- Chris Coppola as Buck
- Emilio De Marchi as Bar Tender / Doctor
