= Thierry Frémont =

French actor

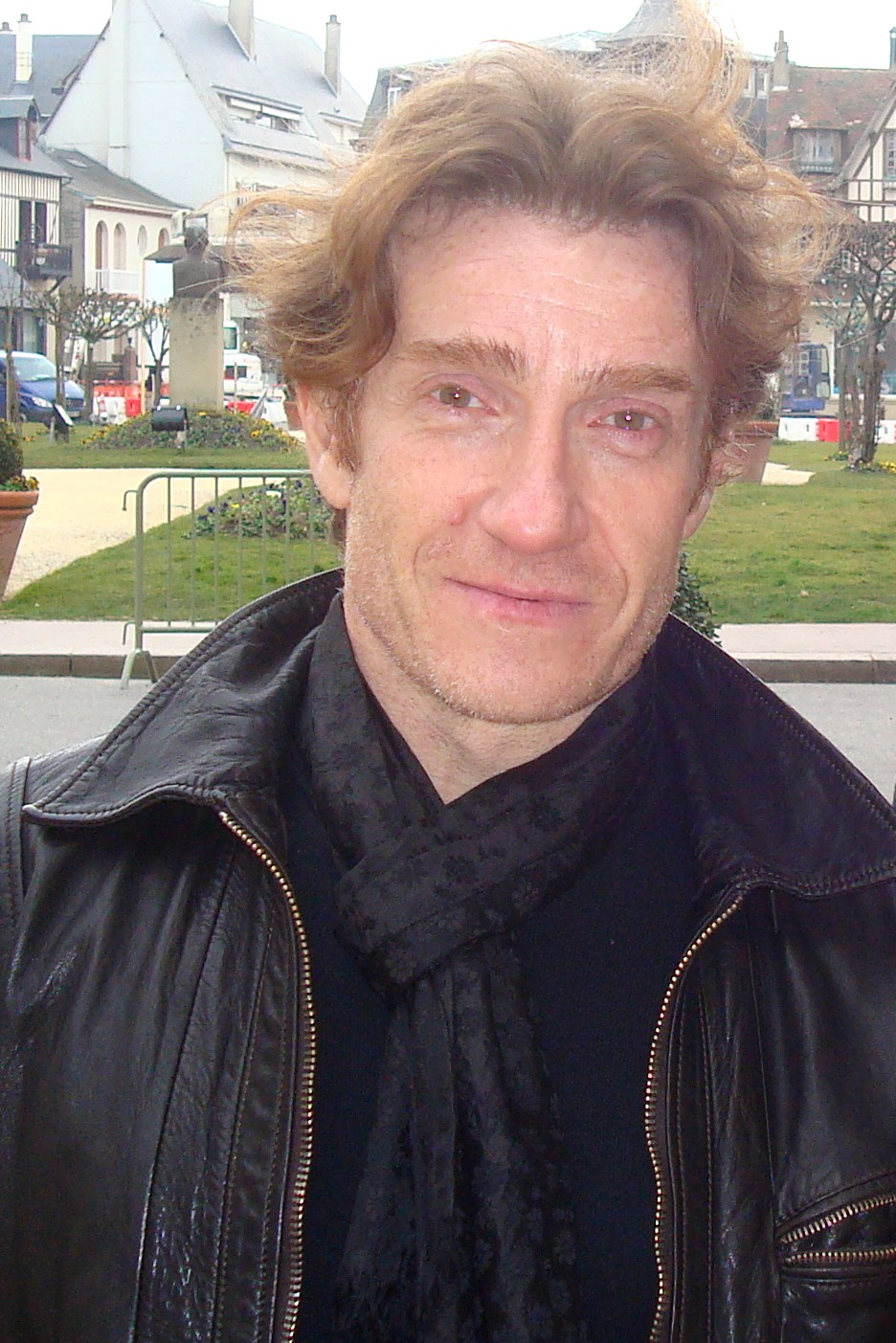
- Frémont in 2010
- Born: 24 July 1962 (age 63); Ozoir-la-Ferrière, Seine-et-Marne, France
- Occupation: Actor
- Years active: 1984–present

Thierry Frémont (born 24 July 1962) is a French actor. He has appeared in more than 60 films and television shows since 1984. He starred in the 1991 film Fortune Express, which was entered into the 41st Berlin International Film Festival.

== Selected filmography ==
- The Cruel Embrace (1987)
- Fortune Express (1991)
- Merci la vie (1991)
- Unpredictable Nature of the River (1996)
- Zie 37 Stagen (1997)
- Nadia and the Hippos (1999)
- Le fils du Français (1999)
- The Secret Book (2006)
- Les Brigades du Tigre (2006)
- Djihad ! (2006)
- The Round Up (2010)
- Djinns (2010)
- The Silence of Joan (2011)
- A Happy Event (2011)
- Zarafa (2012) - Moreno (voice)
- Allied (2016) Paul Delamare
- Transferts (2017, TV series) - Paul Dangeac
- Das Boot (2018, TV series) - Duval
