= Daddy's Girl (2001 film) =

2001 film by Irvine Allan

Daddy's Girl is a short film, the only British film in any Cannes category, directed in 2001 by Irvine Allan and written by John Maley, Carolynne Sinclair Kidd is Producer, Bert Eeles is Editor. Gerry Clark, Music Starring Heather Keenan, Annie George and Russell Hunter it tells the darkly humorous tale of a young girl Teenie left outside a Glasgow pub by her father. Daddy's Girl won the Naples IFF Premio Europa Corto Circuito, Paris IFF Prix de Jury Courte Métrage, Media Wave, Best European Film, Telluride Film Festival- Filmmaker of Tomorrow, Sponsor Larry Simpson Productions, Avanca IFF Portugal, Best Short Film, Capalbio IFF Italy Best Direction, 2001 Cannes Film Festival short film Jury Prize. Allan's partner Annie George (who plays a Good Samaritan in the film) was expecting their baby, so he didn't appear in person to collect the award.

It is a 10-minute film and was made with the help of BBC2 and Scottish Screen.
