= Marie Guillard =

French actress (born 1972)

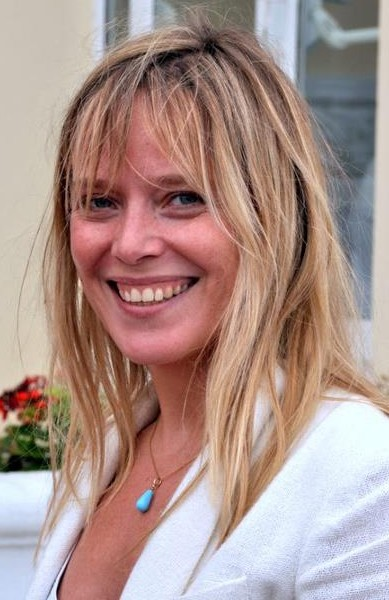
- Guillard at the Cabourg film festival in 2012
- Born: Marie Guillard; 20 June 1972 (age 53); Neuilly-sur-Seine, France
- Occupation: Actress
- Years active: 1993–present

Marie Guillard (born 20 June 1972) is a French actress. She was born in the Paris suburb of Neuilly-sur-Seine.

== Personal life ==
She was married to Nicola Sirkis from July 1995 until November 1998. Presently she is married to Samy Naceri.

== Filmography ==
Year	Title	Role	Notes
1992	Promenades d'été	Magali	
1993	Jacques Le Fataliste	Agathe	
1994	3000 scenarios contre un virus	unknown role	Episode: Deshabille-toi que je t'habille
1994	Neuf mois	Léna	
1994	Extreme limite	Lea	11 episodes
1994	My Friend Max (Mon amie Max)	Catherine	
1994	A la folie	Betty	
1996	Pourquoi partir?	Maryel	Short film
1996	Belles du Louvre	unknown role	Short film
1996	Les Menteurs	Anna	
1996	Delphine 1, Yvan 0	Bernadette	
1997	Elles	Inès	
1997	Les Cordier, juge et flic	Cathy Cohen	Episode: Cathy
1997	The Fifth Element	Burger Assistant	
1998	Mounir et Anita	unknown role	Short film
1998	Les Visiteurs 2	Philippine de Montmirail	
1998	Le Clone	Marie	
1998	Comme une bête	Rosa	
1999	Un pur moment de rock'n roll	Nadine	
1999	Une pour toutes	Prostitute	
2000	Contre la montre	Isabelle	TV movie
2000	Return to Algiers	Alexandre	
2001	Heureuse	unknown role	Short film
2001	Des sur la mer	Marie	TV movie
2002	Retour en ville	unknown role	Short film
2002	La mentale	Lise	
2002	Aram	Prostitute	
2002	Verite oblige	Alexandra Servin	Episode: L'honneur perdu
2003	Facade	Brigitte	Short film
2003	Le Veilleur	unknown role	
2003	Les enfants du miracle	Tania Duquesnoy	TV movie
2004—2009	Franck Keller	Camille Solena	
2004	Podium	Vanessa	
2004	Transit	unknown role	Short film
2005	Jeff et Léo, flics et jumeaux	Patricia Dutour	
2005	Edy	Candidate	
2005	Retiens-moi	Alice	TV movie
2005	Le juge est une femme	Marie Herriot / Sophie Dufrense	Episodes: La petite marchande de fleurs, Cadeau d'enterprise
2006	Avatar		
2007	Santa Closed	File 1	Short film
2007	Counter Investigation	Mathilda Josse	
2007	Le monsieur d'en face	Sandra Manceaux	TV movie
2007	Hubert et le chien	Lena Pedersen	TV movie
2007	Angie	unknown role	Short film
2007	Crysalis	Marie Becker	
2009	Cadeau de rupture	unknown role	Short film
2009	L'instinct d'après	La mère	Short film
2009	Joséphine, ange gardien	Chloé	TV series (1 Episode : "Les Majorettes")
2010	Sable noir	Lucie	Episode: La nuit éternelle
2010	Histoires de vies	La fille du café	Episode: Conte de la frustration
2010	Love Crime	Claudine	
2010	Enquetes reservees	Nathalie Perletti	Episode: Entre chien et louve
2010	L'Assaut	Claire	
2012	R.I.S, police scientifique	Sandra	Episode: En plein coeur
2015	Mon roi	Marie	
