= Karina Testa =

French actress (born 1981)

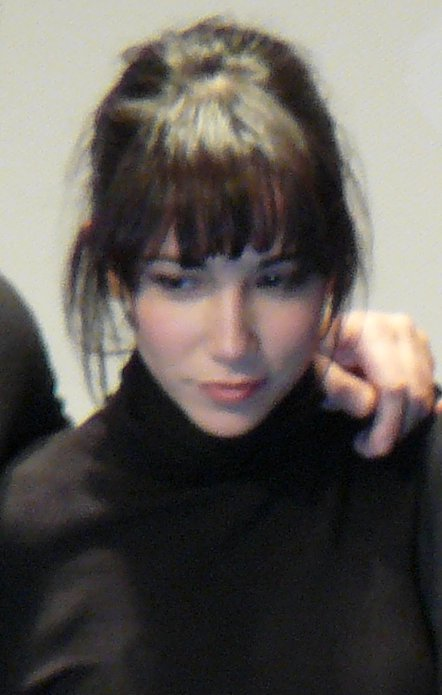
- Karina Testa in 2008
- Born: 5 August 1981 (age 44); Cannes, France
- Occupation: Actress
- Years active: 2001-present

Karina Testa (born 5 August 1981) is a French actress. She appeared in more than twenty films since 2001 including the lead role in Frontier(s).

== Selected filmography ==
Year	Title	Role	Notes
2007	Frontier(s)	Yasmine	
2009	Shadow	Angeline	
2011	Switch	Bénédicte Serteaux	
2011	Les Tuche	Salma	
