= Emilio De Marchi (actor) =

Italian film and television actor

- Born: 12 April 1959 (age 67); Candiana, Italy
- Occupation: Actor
- Years active: 1985-present

Emilio De Marchi (born 12 April 1959) is an Italian film and television actor. He appeared in more than one hundred films in Italy and Germany since 1985.

== Selected filmography ==
Year	Title	Role	Notes
2004	The Passion of Christ	Scornful Roman	
2006	The Family Friend	Chef	
2007	The Demons of St. Petersberg		
2008	L'allenatore nel pallone 2	Ramenko	
2009	Shadow	Bar Tender/Doctor	
2018	The Invisible Boy - Second Generation	Dr. KA	
2019	Romulus & Remus: The First King	Testa di Lupo	
