= Djihad (film) =

- Written by: Félix Olivier; Richard Schlesinger
- Directed by: Félix Olivier
- Starring: Adel Bencherif; Marianne Denicourt; Thierry Frémont; Saïd Taghmaoui; Igal Naor
- Country of origin: France
- Original languages: French, Arabic, English

Production
- Producer: Jacques Ouaniche
- Running time: 2 x 100 minutes

Original release
- Release: 2006

Djihad! is a 2006 French drama television film by director and writer Félix Olivier.

== Plot ==
The lives and destinies of five French characters intersect during the Iraq War. Three young French Arabs (Cherif, Karim, and Youssef) each for a different reason joins a jihadi group to fight against the Americans. Delphine LeGuen, a 40-something French woman running an NGO in Baghdad at the outbreak of the war, gets kidnapped and held by the jihadi insurgents. Meanwhile, a mid-level French diplomat, Hugo Bessieres, uncovers French corruption of the UN Oil for Food program while gathering evidence to support his country's effort to prevent the war.

== Cast ==
- Adel Bencherif as Karim
- Marianne Denicourt as Delphine Le Guen
- Thierry Frémont as Hugo Bessières
- Saïd Taghmaoui as Youssef
- Slimane Hadjar as Chérif
- Igal Naor as Colonel Walid

== Accolades ==
Year	Awards	Category	Recipient	Result
2007	Globes de Cristal Award	Best TV Movie / TV Series	Felix Olivier	Nominated
