= The Bird (film) =

2011 French film

- Directed by: Yves Caumon
- Written by: Yves Caumon
- Starring: Sandrine Kiberlain; Clément Sibony; Bruno Todeschini
- Cinematography: Céline Bozon
- Edited by: Sylvie Fauthoux
- Music by: Thierry Machuel
- Release date: 2011
- Country: France
- Language: French

The Bird (French: L'Oiseau) is a 2011 French drama film written and directed by Yves Caumon.

The film premiered at the 68th edition of the Venice Film Festival, in the Horizons competition.

== Cast ==
- Sandrine Kiberlain as Anne
- Clément Sibony as Raphaël
- Bruno Todeschini as Marc
- Serge Riaboukine as Claude
- Alice Belaïdi as Latifa
- Mirela Sofronea as Christina
- Marianne Ploquin as Elise

== Reception ==
On the review aggregator website Rotten Tomatoes, 64% of 11 critics' reviews are positive, with an average rating of 5.0/10.
