= Captain Ahab (disambiguation) =

Captain Ahab was the captain of the Pequod in Herman Melville's 1851 novel Moby-Dick.

Captain Ahab may also refer to:

- Captain Ahab (band), a Los Angeles–based pop/electronic band
- Capitaine Achab, (English title: Captain Ahab), a French film directed by Philippe Ramos
- Captain Ahab: The Story of Dave Stieb, a baseball documentary produced by Secret Base
- Captain Ahab, a major antagonist in the game Limbus Company

== See also ==
- Ahab (disambiguation)
