= The New Toy =

- French theatrical release poster
- French: Le Nouveau Jouet
- Directed by: James Huth
- Written by: James Huth; Sonja Shillito
- Based on: The Toy by Francis Veber
- Produced by: Richard Grandpierre
- Starring: Jamel Debbouze; Daniel Auteuil; Simon Faliu; Alice Belaïdi; Anna Cervinka; Lucia Sanchez
- Cinematography: Stéphane Le Parc
- Edited by: Dorian Rigal-Ansous
- Production companies: Eskwad; M6 Films
- Distributed by: Sony Pictures Releasing (France) SAS
- Release date: 19 October 2022 (France)
- Running time: 112 minutes
- Country: France
- Language: French
- Box office: $7.3 million

The New Toy (French: Le Nouveau Jouet) is a 2022 French comedy film directed by James Huth and starring Jamel Debbouze. It is a remake of a 1976 film by Francis Veber, The Toy (Le Jouet), with Debbouze reprising the role played by Pierre Richard.

== Cast ==
- Jamel Debbouze: Sami Chérif (alias Gunther)
- Daniel Auteuil: Philippe Étienne
- Simon Faliu: Alexandre Étienne
- Alice Belaïdi: Alice, Sami's wife
- Anna Cervinka: Léa
- Aton : Milo, the bodyguard
- Laurent Saint-Gérard: Henri, the driver
- Salim Kissari: Jean-Louis
- Lucia Sanchez: Ana Maria
- Dorylia Calmel: Stef
- Atmen Kélif: Moussa
- Redouanne Harjane: Nono, Alice's brother
- Gilles Cohen: André Pouzier, Galeries Lafayette's director
- Mahdi Alaoui: Az
- Guillaume Bursztyn: Lucien, garden worker
- Nicky Marbot: Paul, garden worker
- Hervé Falloux
- Lionel Rosso: reporter
- Jeanne Bournaud: TV speaker
- Fatima Debbouze: Mrs Belkassem
- Vivien Gottwald: New bodyguard
