= A Summer Dress =

Une robe d'été
- French poster
- Directed by: François Ozon
- Written by: François Ozon
- Produced by: Olivier Delbosc
- Starring: Frédéric Mangenot, Sébastien Charles and Lucia Sanchez
- Cinematography: Yorick Le Saux
- Edited by: Jeanne Moutard
- Music by: Sonny Bono
- Release date: 1996
- Running time: 15 minutes
- Country: France
- Language: French

A Summer Dress (French: Une robe d'été) is a 1996 short film directed by François Ozon about a flagging gay relationship that is refueled in an unexpected way.

== Plot ==
Luc (Frédéric Mangenot) spends his holiday by the sea with his slightly older boyfriend, Sébastien (Sébastien Charles). At the house they have rented, Sébastien's flamboyant dancing frustrates Luc, who rebukes him that the neighbors might see. Irritated, Luc goes off on his bicycle to the beach, hoping to find some solitude.

On the beach, Luc is finally alone and goes skinny dipping. Afterwards, he sunbathes in the nude and meets Lucia (Lucia Sanchez), a Spanish tourist about his age, who, after some flirtatious conversation, invites Luc to accompany her into the nearby wood for a tryst. Luc, though somewhat bashful, obliges with little hesitation. After having sex, Lucia learns that Luc is erotically involved with Sébastien and has never been with a woman before. She asks if he's gay, and he replies no, he and Sébastien are just friends who sometimes fool around, implying that he's unsure of his sexuality.

The two return to the beach to find that Luc's clothes have been stolen. Lucia lends Luc her summer dress so that he won't have to return home completely naked. Wearing a woman's dress improves Luc's mood as a car driver honks his horn after him on the ride back. He returns to the cabin with a smile and a renewed sense of freedom. Luc surprises Sébastien when he comes in. After a few amused remarks about the dress (Luc flirtatiously refers to himself as a "beautiful girl"), the two have passionate sex in the kitchen. The dress is partially torn in the act.

The next day, Luc mends the summer dress and brings it back to Lucia, who is just leaving. However, she refuses to accept it, coyly suggesting that it may come in handy in the future. She kisses Luc goodbye. The final frame shows Luc watching her leave, the dress wrapped around his neck and fluttering in the sea breeze.

== Reception ==
The film won awards at the Brest European Short Film Festival and the L.A. Outfest.

Thibault Shilt of Senses of Cinema has cited the film as an example of a trend in recent French cinema of presenting sexual fluidity in "new, innovative ways."

In Ozon's 2020 film Summer of 85, when David suggests that his friend Alex buy a dress it has the same pattern as the one "that liberated the uptight lover in Ozon’s seminal short A Summer Dress".
