= Adel Bencherif =

French actor

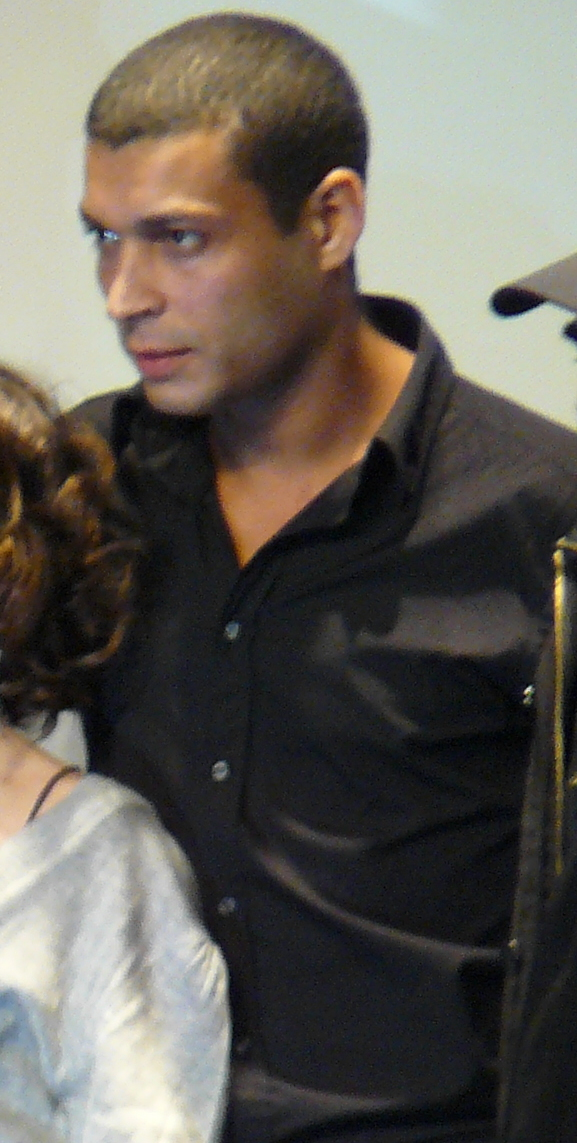
- Adel Bencherif in 2008.
- Born: 30 May 1975 (age 50); Saint-Maurice, France
- Occupation: Actor
- Years active: 2001–present

Adel Bencherif (born 30 May 1975) is a French actor. He is best known for his role in the 2009 film A Prophet.

== Filmography ==
- 2004: Grande École - Ouvrier flash-back 2
- 2004: Safia et Sarah - Un jeune de la cité
- 2005: Ze film - Aziz
- 2006: Paris, je t'aime - Le voleur de guitare (segment "Place des Fetes")
- 2006: Cages - Rabbah
- 2006: Djihad! (TV) - Karim
- 2007: Les Liens du sang (TV) - Abdel
- 2007: Frontier(s) - Sami
- 2007: Andalucia directed by Alain Gomis - Farid
- 2008: Go Fast - Sed
- 2009: A Prophet (in French Un prophète) directed by Jacques Audiard - Ryad
- 2010: Of Gods and Men
- 2011: Sleepless Night
- 2013: Rock the Casbah
- 2013: The Dream Kids - Sofiane
- 2015: Spectre - Abrika
- 2016: Iris - Malek Ziani
- 2016: London Has Fallen - Raza Mansoor
- 2019: War of the Worlds - Colonel Mustafa Mokrani
