= Khaled Ghorbal =

Tunisian film director

- Born: 1950; Sfax
- Citizenship: Tunisia
- Occupation(s): Filmmaker and screenwriter

Khaled Ghorbal (born 1950 in Sfax) is a Tunisian filmmaker and screenwriter.

== Biography and career ==
Ghorbal studied at the Dramatic Art Center of Tunis. He arrived in France in 1970 to complete his theatrical training, at the International University of Theatre in Paris, at the University of Paris VIII and then at the Jacques Lecoq Mime School Mouvement Théâtre. He launched his career as an actor, then as a theater director. For nearly ten years, he programmed and directed two art house theaters in the Paris region.

In 1996, he directed El Mokhtar (The Chosen One), his first short fiction film, addressing the issue of fundamentalism and the brainwashing of youth. The film was selected in many international festivals. In 1999 he left for Tunisia to shoot Fatma, his first feature film. The film premiered at Cannes and won a number of prizes, notably at the FESPACO.

== Filmography ==
=== As director ===
- 1996: El Mokhtar(The Chosen One)
- 2001 : Fatma
- 2008 : Un si beau voyage
- 2015 : Zaafrane (Saffron)
