= Ahab (disambiguation) =

Ahab (869–850 BC) was a Hebrew king.

Ahab may also refer to:

- Captain Ahab, a character in the novel Moby-Dick
- Ahab (band), a German funeral doom metal band founded in 2004
- "Ahab the Arab", a song by Ray Stevens
- Ahab (prophet), an impious prophet in the time of the Babylonian captivity of Judah (Book of Jeremiah 29:21)
- Ahab (comics), a Marvel Comics supervillain
- Ahab, from Limbus Company

== See also ==
- Captain Ahab (disambiguation)
