= Le Chant des Africains =

"Le Chant des Africains" (The Song of the Africans) is a French military song and the unofficial anthem of the Pied-noir community in France and its former colonies in Africa.

== History ==
=== World War I ===
Originally written in 1914 by a Sergeant-Major Bendifallah and companyman Marizot, Le Chant des Africains is a testimony to the bravery of a Moroccan goumier regiment disbanded after suffering severe losses in Meaux, northeast of Paris. The song became popular among the soldiery as well as civilians, but was not set to music until 1918 by Félix Boyer, bandmaster of the Algerian Garrison.

=== World War II ===
Battleflag of the 7e RCA showing its 1944-45 Allied campaigns.

The lyrics were modified in 1943 to include all Africans who identified as Frenchmen or Pieds-noirs, especially those from the Arab world. Also changed were references to location, as most singers had returned to the colonies. Ironically, this situation has again reversed itself in the meantime. This 1943 version was dedicated to Lt.Col. van Hecke's fr:7e régiment de chasseurs d'Afrique who fought the 1944-45 Italian, French and German Allied military campaigns.

=== Algerian War ===
The song was reportedly being used by the Europeans supporting the status quo of French Algeria against its independence supported by president Charles de Gaulle. Because of that the song was forbidden from the French military until it was authorized again, in 1969.

=== Today ===
Le Chant des Africains remains today an adopted symbol of identity for the Pied-noir community.

== Lyrics ==
Below are the lyrics of the first stanza and refrain of the 1914 and 1944 versions.

Le Chant des Africains (1914, 1918)		Le Chant des Africains (1944)
I		I
Nous étions au fond de l'Afrique	We were in the heart of Africa	Nous étions au fond de l'Afrique	We were in the heart of Africa
Embellissant nos trois couleurs,	Embellishing our three colors,	Gardiens jaloux de nos couleurs,	Jealous guardians of our colors,
Et sous un soleil magnifique,	And under a magnificent sun,	Quand, sous un soleil magnifique,	When, under a magnificent sun,
Retentissait ce chant vainqueur :	Resounded this victory chant:	Retentissait ce cri vainqueur :	Resounded this victory cry:
En avant ! En avant ! En avant !	Forward! Forward! Forward!	En avant ! En avant ! En avant !	Forward! Forward! Forward!
Refrain		Refrain
C'est nous les Marocains,	We are the Moroccans,	C'est nous les Africains,	We are the Africans,
Qui venons de bien loin.	Who come from far away.	Qui arrivons de loin.	Who arrive from afar.
Nous v'nons d'la colonie,	We come from the colony,	Nous venons des colonies,	We come from the colonies,
Pour défen'le pays.	To defend the country.	Pour sauver le pays.	To save the country.
Nous avons abandonné	We have abandoned	Nous avons quitté	We have left
Nos parents nos aimées,	Our family and friends,	Parents, gourbis, foyers,	Family, huts, and homes,
Et nous avons au cœur,	And we have in our hearts,	Et nous gardons au cœur,	And we keep in our hearts,
Une invincible ardeur,	An invincible ardor,	Une invincible ardeur,	An invincible ardor,
Car nous voulons porter haut et fier	For we want to carry high and proud	Car nous voulons porter haut et fier	For we want to carry high and proud
Ce beau drapeau de notre France altière :	This beautiful flag of our proud France;	Le beau drapeau de notre France entière :	The beautiful flag of our whole France;
Et si quelqu'un venait à y toucher,	And if anyone tried to hurt her,	Et si quelqu'un voulait nous séparer,	And if someone tried to separate us,
Nous serions là pour mourir à ses pieds.	We would be there to die at her feet.	Nous saurions tous mourir jusqu'au dernier.	We would fight to the last man.
Roulez tambour, à nos amours,	Roll on the drums, to our loves,	Battez tambour, à nos amours,	Strike the drum, to our loves,
Pour la Patrie, pour la Patrie	For the Fatherland, for the Fatherland	Pour le pays, pour la Patrie	For the country, for the Fatherland
Mourir bien loin, c'est nous les Marocains !	To die far away, we are the Moroccans!	Mourir bien loin, c'est nous les Africains !	To die far away, we are the Africans!
