= Capitaine Achab =

- Directed by: Philippe Ramos
- Screenplay by: Philippe Ramos
- Produced by: Michel Klein; Jérôme Larcher
- Starring: Frédéric Bonpart
- Cinematography: Laurent Desmet
- Edited by: Sophie Deseuzes
- Release date: 2004
- Running time: 22 minutes
- Country: France
- Language: French
- Box office: $331.000

Capitaine Achab (in English, Captain Ahab) is a 2004 French short film directed by Philippe Ramos. It is an interpretation of Herman Melville's 1851 novel Moby-Dick. The film follows a young Achab and the events that inspire his eventual journey to the sea. The film was presented at the Cannes Film Festival and Pantin in 2004.

In 2007 a full-length (100 min.) version was released.

== Cast ==
Short version

- Valérie Crunchant : Louise
- Frédéric Bonpart : Achab
  - Alexis Locquet : Young Achab
- Dominique Blanc : Anna
- Aristide Demonico : Achab's father
- Aymeric Descrèpes : Starbuck
- Mona Heftre : Achab's Aunt
- Grégory Gadebois : The guardian

Long version

- Denis Lavant : Capitaine Achab
- Virgil Leclair : Young Achab
- Dominique Blanc : Anna
- Bernard Blancan : Will Adams
- Hande Kodja : Louise
- Jean-François Stévenin : Achab's father
- Mona Heftre : Rose
- Philippe Katerine : Henry
- Jacques Bonnaffé : Starbuck
- Carlo Brandt: Mulligan
- Jean-Paul Bonnaire : Pastor
- Jean-Christophe Bouvet : the king of England
- Pierre Pellet : Jim Larsson
- Lou Castel : Dr Hogganbeck
- Denis Déon : Sam
- Adama Doubia : le colleur d'affiches
- Gérard Essomba : Carpenter
- Guillaume Verdier : Ismaël
- Grégory Gadebois : Warehouse Guardian
- Dorothée Brugère : la blanchisseuse n°1
- Samantha Mialet : la blanchisseuse n°2

== Awards ==
- "Prix de la presse 2003" at the "Festival du film court de Paris"
