= Sandra Martin =

- Born: Sewickley, PA
- Other name: Sandy Martin
- Occupations: Author, Blogger, educator
- Years active: 1976–present
- Website: www.specialtyedu.com

Sandra Martin is the author of the highly read Breaking the "Sound" Barrier to Fluent Reading, a curricular reading/spelling intervention designed to reach the at-risk learner. Sandra has been a teacher and curriculum developer for 38 years in the Conewago Valley School District and for Dickinson College, PA and is a guest writer for the Teachthought educational community. Sandra's three Breaking the "Sound" Barrier books have been a part of university-backed research that demonstrated their positive role as reading/spelling interventions in the classroom. Sandy also authored Mathopedia Levels 1 and 2, mathematical encyclopedias that assist students with the basics of mathematics.

== Academic credentials ==
Bachelor of Science in Special Education, Bloomsburg University, PA.

Master of Education in Learning Disabilities, Shippensburg University, PA.

== Published works ==
Books

- Breaking the "Sound" Barrier to Fluent Reading (BSB), Level 1 (Specialty Educational Publishers, March 2002, Updated 2014)
- Mathopedia, Level 1 (Chapter) ((Specialty Educational Publishers, 2003)
- Mathopedia, Level 2 (Chapter) ((Specialty Educational Publishers, 2003)
- Breaking the "Sound" Barrier to Fluent Reading (BSB), Level 2 (Specialty Educational Publishers, 2008)
- Breaking the Sound Barrier to Fluent Reading, Level 3 (Specialty Educational Publishers, 2008)

Articles

- Breaking the Sound Barrier to Fluent Reading (Keystone Leader, 1998)
- The Increasingly Dated Image of the Slacker Teacher (Teachthought, 2014)
