= Olivier Schatzky =

French film director and screenwriter (born 1949)

- Born: 1949 (age 76–77)
- Occupations: Film director Screenwriter
- Years active: 1986 - present

Olivier Schatzky (born 1949) is a French film director and screenwriter. His 1991 film Fortune Express was entered into the 41st Berlin International Film Festival.

== Filmography ==
- 1986 : Le Complexe du kangourou, Screenwriter
- 1987 : A Man in Love, Screenwriter
- 1989 : Force Majeure, Screenwriter
- 1990 : Fortune Express, Director / Screenwriter
- 1994 : Maigret (TV series): episode "Maigret et l'écluse no.1", Director
- 1996 : L'Elève, Director / Screenwriter (Based on the story "The Pupil" by Henry James)
- 1999 : Monsieur Naphtali, Director
- 2007 : Chez Maupassant (TV): episode "Le père Amable", Director
- 2008 : Chez Maupassant (TV): episode "Aux champs", Director
- 2009 : Au siècle de Maupassant: Contes et nouvelles du XIXème siècle (TV): episode "Claude Gueux", Director
- 2009 : Quand la guerre sera loin (TV), Director
- 2010 : Au siècle de Maupassant: Contes et nouvelles du XIXème siècle (TV): episode "Aimé de son concierge", Director
- 2011 : Chez Maupassant (TV): episode "Yvette", Director
