= Barry Dignam =

Irish filmmaker (born 1971)

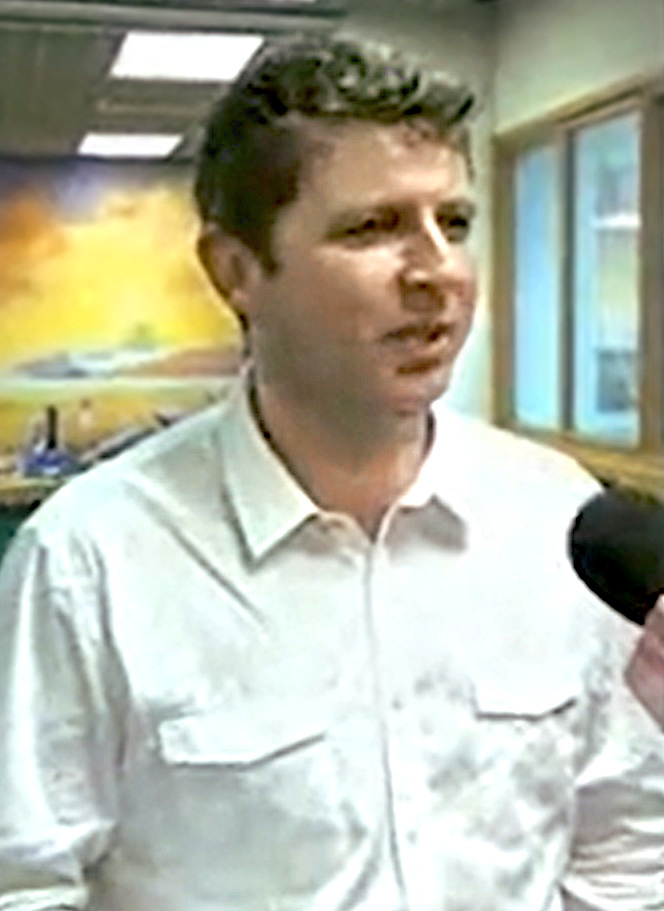
- Dignam at JDIFF 2011
- Born: 31 March 1971 (age 55)
- Education: Trinity College, Dublin
- Occupations: Director, writer, producer Lecturer (IADT Dún Laoghaire)
- Years active: 1997–present
- Spouse: Hugh Walsh
- Website: www.barrydignam.com

Barry Dignam (born 31 March 1971) is an Irish filmmaker. Some of his films are Chicken, Dream Kitchen, Stages, Bounce and A Ferret Called Mickey.

== Career ==
Barry Dignam studied drama at Trinity College, Dublin and Film at the National Film School of Ireland (IADT). He has made a number of internationally successful shorts including Chicken, Dream Kitchen and A Ferret Called Mickey. His films have been presented in official selection at over a hundred and fifty international film festivals and have won numerous awards. Dignam's work has been screened by top broadcasters including Film Four, PBS, Canal+ and have been released on DVD and theatrically in both Europe and the US.

Dignam lectures in screenwriting and direction at the National Film School at IADT Dún Laoghaire.

== Personal life ==
Dignam and his partner, Hugh Walsh, are one of the first couples to enter into civil partnership in Ireland, and the first to do so after the mandatory three-month wait (six previous couples were granted exemptions on compassionate grounds).
