= Valérie Crunchant =

French actress

- Born: 1978 (age 47–48); Paris, France
- Occupation: Actress

Valérie Crunchant (born 1978) is a French actress.

She was born in Évry, Essonne, a suburb of Paris.

Valérie Crunchant appears in All the fine promises (2003), directed and written by Jean-Paul Civeyrac (based on Anne Wiazemsky's novel) as the young Ghislaine.

She appeared on Capitaine Achab (2004) directed by Philippe Ramos/

She made her first appearance on the stage with Francis Huster in «Théâtre Marigny» (Paris, 1992) in «Suite Royale» by Crébillon and in «Le Cid» by Pierre Corneille.

In 2004, she appeared as Cérès in the play «Les Felins m’aiment bien» by Olivia Rosenthal (directed by Alain Ollivier). In 2006 and 2007, she is La Comtesse in «La Fausse Suivante» by Marivaux (directed by Elisabeth Chailloux).

== Filmography ==
- Reminiscence (2001)
- Le livre (The book, 2001)
- A la hache (2002)
- All the Fine Promises (2003)
- Capitaine Achab (2004)
- À travers la forêt (2005)
- Guillaume et les sortilèges (2006)
