= Jean-Paul Civeyrac =

French film director

Jean-Paul Civeyrac (born 24 December 1964) is a French director whose films are usually characterized by close attention to music and actors' bodies. He has adapted a French novel by Anne Wiazemsky, Hymnes à l'amour, with the title All the fine promises (2003). This movie was awarded by The Prix Jean Vigo 2003. Jean-Paul Civeyrac is professor at the French school, La Fémis, and graduated from the Jean Moulin University Lyon 3 (philosophy).

Jean-Paul Civeyrac has discovered many young talents :

- Camille Berthomier in À travers la forêt
- Valérie Crunchant in All the fine promises,
- Lucia Sanchez in Les solitaires,
- Renaud Bécard in Man's Gentle Love

His movie À travers la forêt was presented at Festival Paris Cinéma (2 July 2005) and at Toronto International Film Festival 2005 September.

In his survey of contemporary French cinema, Tim Palmer discusses Civeyrac's career in the context of his teaching at the major French film school, la Fémis; Civeyrac's status as an "applied cinephile" in which he carefully cites and revives the aesthetics of historical filmmakers like Mizoguchi and Cocteau; his neglected situation outside France; and his position as a remarkably uncompromising director, whose films often refuse to differentiate between fantasy and diegetic reality.

== Filmography ==
1. Ni d'Eve ni d'Adam (1996)
2. Les solitaires (2000)
3. Fantômes (2001)
4. Man's Gentle Love (French title : Le doux amour des hommes, 2002)
5. All the fine promises (French title : Toutes ces belles promesse, 2003)
6. Tristesse beau visage (2004)
7. À travers la forêt (2005)
8. Ma belle rebelle (2006)
9. Mon prince charmant (2006)
10. Malika s'est envolée (2008)
11. Des filles en noir (2010)
12. Mon Amie Victoria (2014)
13. A Paris Education (2018)

== Awards ==
- 2003: Prix Jean Vigo for All the Fine Promises.
- 2001: Grand Prix du Long Métrage Français at the Entrevues Belfort festival for Fantômes.
