= Philippe Ramos =

French film director (born 1966)

- Born: 1966 (age 59–60); Drôme, France
- Occupations: Film director, screenwriter, film editor
- Years active: 1980–present

Philippe Ramos (born 1966) is a French film director, screenwriter and film editor. He directed an adaptation of Moby-Dick: Capitaine Achab with Valérie Crunchant and Frédéric Bonpart in 2004, and a 2011 historical film, The Silence of Joan.

== Filmography ==
Year	Title	Credited as			Notes
Year	Title	Director	Screenwriter	Editor	Notes
1993	Les Îles désertes	Yes	Yes		Short film
1995	Vers le silence	Yes	Yes		Short film
1996	Ici-bas	Yes	Yes	Yes	Short film
2000	Noah's Ark	Yes	Yes	Yes	
2003	Farewell Homeland	Yes	Yes	Yes	
2004	Capitaine Achab	Yes	Yes		Short film (also as production designer)
2007	Capitaine Achab	Yes	Yes	Yes	Also as art director Locarno International Film Festival - Best Direction Award; Locarno International Film Festival - FIPRESCI Prize
2011	The Silence of Joan	Yes	Yes	Yes	Also as cinematographer
2015	Mad Love	Yes	Yes	Yes	Also as cinematographer Montreal World Film Festival - Grand Prix des Amériques
