= Xavier Gens =

French film director

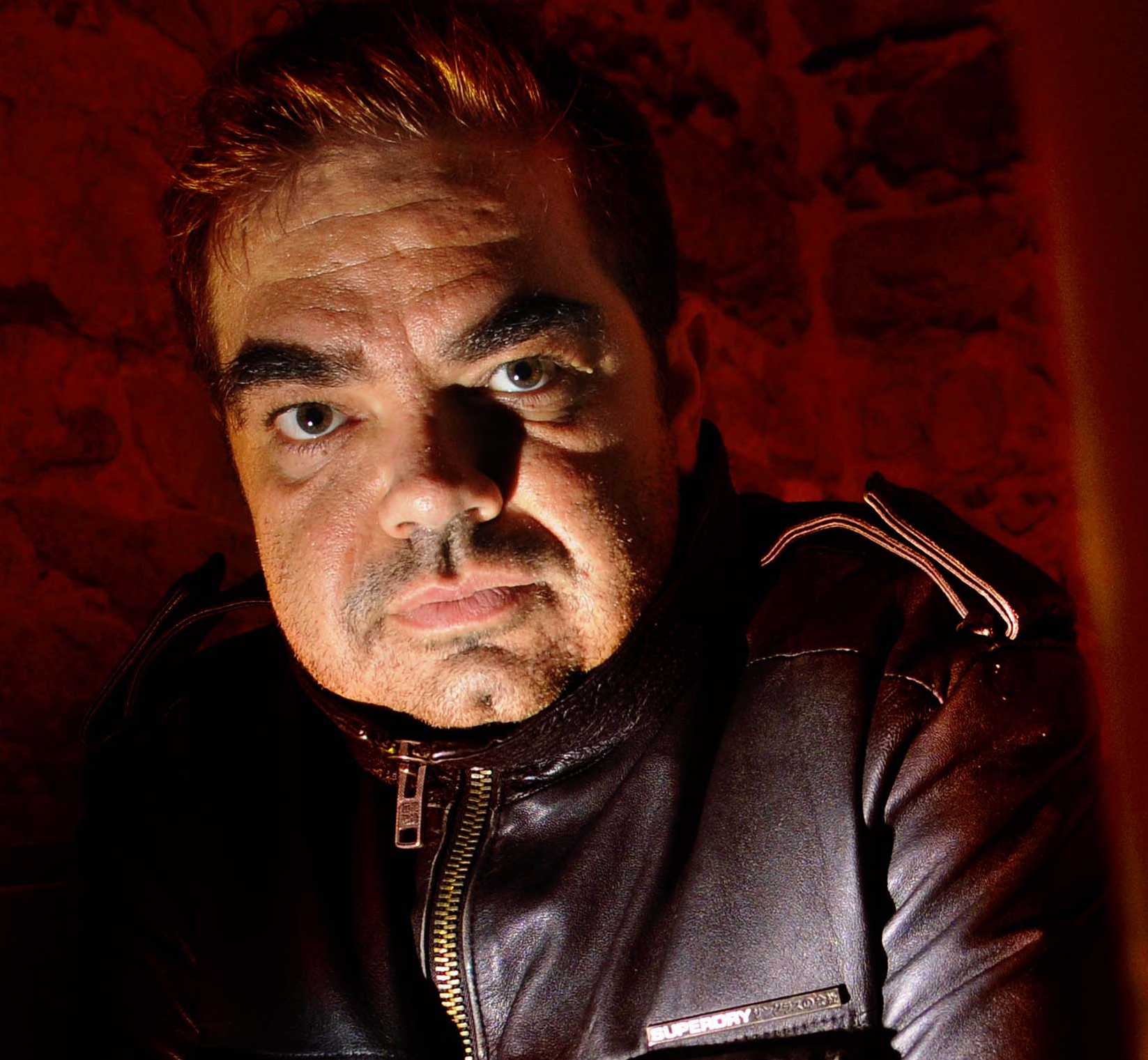
- Gens at the Teatro Victoria Eugenia in 2011
- Born: 27 April 1975 (age 51); Dunkirk, France
- Occupations: Film director, screenwriter, producer
- Years active: 1996–present

Xavier Gens (French: [ɡzavje ʒɑ̃s]; born on 27 April 1975) is a French film director, screenwriter and producer.

== Career ==
Gens directed three short films in his native language, BTK – Born to Kast (2000), Au petit matin (2005) and Sable noir (2006), before being hired by 20th Century Fox to direct his debut English-language film, Hitman (2007). The same year, he directed his first French-language feature, Frontier(s).

In October 2007, a few weeks before the film's release, reports came in that Fox had turned down the version that Gens submitted to them. Nicolas de Toth was brought in to edit the film for commercial purposes and the studio ordered reshoots. While the studio denied claims that Gens had been fired due to the extreme violence in his cut, and insisted that he was still on the project, some reports stated that Gens was not even in the country as these reshoots were being made. Despite being critically panned, Hitman was a success with a gross of $92 million, Gens' most successful film.

He narrated and produced the French zombie film La Horde, directed by Yannick Dahan and Benjamin Rocher. The film was released in 2009 and distributed by IFC Films. Gens directed The Divide (initially titled The Fallout), his second English-language film, which features Michael Biehn in the lead role.

On television, he has directed episodes of Crossing Lines (2014), Gangs of London (2020), Mortel (2021) and Lupin (2023).

In 2024, his Netflix shark-themed film, Under Paris, became what was described as "the popcorn film of the summer". The same year, alongside Vincent Roget and Eric Lavaine's banner Sameplayer, Gens launched a new production company called Good Players.

== Filmography ==
Short films

| Year | Title | Director | Writer | Notes |
|---|---|---|---|---|
| 2000 | BTK – Born to Kast | Yes | Yes | |
| 2005 | Au petit matin | Yes | Yes | |
| 2006 | Sable noir | Yes | Yes | |
| 2012 | X Is for XXL | Yes | No | Segment of The ABCs of Death |

Feature films

| Year | Title | Director | Writer |
|---|---|---|---|
| 2007 | Frontier(s) | Yes | Yes |
| 2007 | Hitman | Yes | No |
| 2011 | The Divide | Yes | No |
| 2017 | Cold Skin | Yes | No |
| 2017 | The Crucifixion | Yes | No |
| 2018 | Budapest | Yes | No |
| 2023 | Mayhem! | Yes | Yes |
| 2024 | Under Paris | Yes | Yes |

Acting roles

- Le Bon, la Brute et les Zombies (2004)
- Lady Blood (2008)
- La Horde (2009, voice only)

Television

| Year | Title | Notes |
|---|---|---|
| 2006 | Sable noir | Episode "Fotografik" |
| 2014 | Crossing Lines | 3 episodes |
| 2020 | Gangs of London | 3 episodes |
| 2021 | Mortel | 3 episodes |
| 2023 | Lupin | 3 episodes |

Other credits

| Year | Title | Role |
|---|---|---|
| 1996 | Maximum Risk | Production assistant |
| 1996 | Never Ever | Production assistant |
| 1997 | Double Team | Production assistant |
| 1997 | Madame Jacques sur la Croisette | Production assistant |
| 1997 | Le Bossu | Production manager |
| 1997 | Les Kidnappeurs | Production manager |
| 1999 | The Secret Laughter of Women | Production assistant |
| 2000 | 30 Ans | Casting director |
| 2000 | Cramps | Production assistant |
| 2009 | La Horde | Production assistant |
| 2016 | Cell | Production assistant |
