= List of awards and nominations received by Bertrand Bonello =

Bertrand Bonello awards and nominations
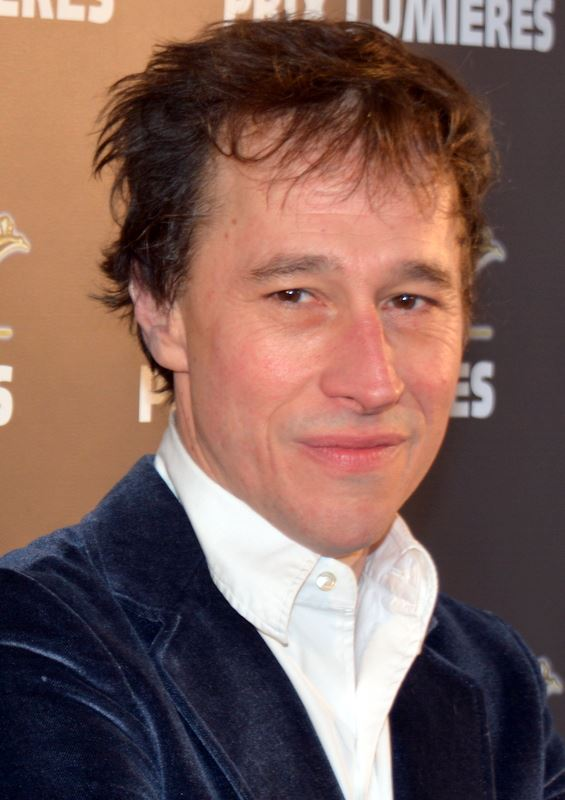
- Bonello in 2015
Awards and nominations
Award	Wins	Nominations

Totals (Note: Certain award groups do not simply award one winner. They acknowledge several different recipients, have runners-up, and have third place. Since this is a specific recognition and is different from losing an award, runner-up mentions are considered wins in this award tally. For simplification and to avoid errors, each award in this list has been presumed to have had a prior nomination.)
- Wins: 6
- Nominations: 43

The following is a list of awards and nominations received by French filmmaker Bertrand Bonello.

== Berlin International Film Festival ==
Year	Nominated work	Category	Result	Ref
2022	Coma	Encounters Award	Nominated	
2022	Coma	FIPRESCI Award	Won	

== Brussels International Film Festival ==
Year	Nominated work	Category	Result	Ref
2019	Zombi Child	Grand Prix	Nominated	

== Cannes Film Festival ==
Year	Nominated work	Category	Result	Ref
2001	The Pornographer	FIPRESCI Award–International Critics Week	Won	
2003	Tiresia	Palme d'Or	Nominated	
2008	On War	Directors' Fortnight–Europa Cinemas Award	Nominated	
2008	On War	Directors' Fortnight–CICAE Award	Nominated	
2008	On War	Directors' Fortnight–FIPRESCI Award	Nominated	
2008	On War	Directors' Fortnight–Regards Jeune Award	Nominated	
2008	On War	Directors' Fortnight–SACD Award	Nominated	
2011	House of Tolerance	Palme d'Or	Nominated	
2014	Saint Laurent	Palme d'Or	Nominated	
2014	Saint Laurent	Queer Palm	Nominated	
2019	Zombi Child	Queer Palm	Nominated	

== César Awards ==
Year	Nominated work	Category	Result	Ref
2012	House of Tolerance	Best Original Music	Nominated	
2014	Saint Laurent	Best Film	Nominated	
2014	Saint Laurent	Best Director	Nominated	

== Film Comment ==
Year	Nominated work	Category	Result	Ref
2022	Coma	Best Undistributed Film of 2022	Runner-up	

== Ghent International Film Festival ==
Year	Nominated work	Category	Result	Ref
2022	Coma	Explore Zone Award	Nominated	

== International Cinephile Society Awards ==
Year	Nominated work	Category	Result	Ref
2018	Nocturama	Best Director	Nominated	

== International Online Cinema Awards (INOCA) ==
Year	Nominated work	Category	Result	Ref
2015	Saint Laurent	Halfway Award - Best Non-English Language Film	Nominated	
2018	Nocturama	Best Non-English Language Film	Nominated	

== Istanbul Film Festival ==
Year	Nominated work	Category	Result	Ref
2022	Coma	Golden Tulip - International Competition	Nominated	

== Las Palmas de Gran Canaria International Film Festival ==
Year	Nominated work	Category	Result	Ref
2022	Coma	Golden Lady Harimaguada Award for Best Feature Film	Nominated	

== Lisbon & Estoril Film Festival ==
Year	Nominated work	Category	Result	Ref
2016	Nocturama	Best Film	Nominated	
2019	Zombi Child	Best Film	Nominated	

== Longtake Interactive Film Festival ==
Year	Nominated work	Category	Result	Ref
2022	Coma	Best Film	Nominated	

== Lumière Awards ==
Year	Nominated work	Category	Result	Ref
2012	House of Tolerance	Best Film	Nominated	
2012	House of Tolerance	Best Director	Nominated	
2012	House of Tolerance	Best Screenplay	Nominated	
2015	Saint Laurent	Best Director	Nominated	
2015	Saint Laurent	Best Screenplay	Nominated	
2017	Nocturama	Best Film	Nominated	
2017	Nocturama	Best Director	Nominated	

== Magritte Awards ==
Year	Nominated work	Category	Result	Ref
2015	Saint Laurent	Best Foreign Film in Coproduction	Nominated	

== Mar del Plata International Film Festival ==
Year	Nominated work	Category	Result	Ref
2011	House of Tolerance	Best Film - International Competition	Nominated	
2016	Nocturama	Best Film - International Competition	Nominated	

== Miami International Film Festival ==
Year	Nominated work	Category	Result	Ref
2009	On War	Cutting the Edge Award	Won	

== Palm Springs International Film Festival ==
Year	Nominated work	Category	Result	Ref
2014	Saint Laurent	FIPRESCI Award	Nominated	

== Prix Henri-Langlois ==
Year	Nominated work	Category	Result	Ref
2012	House of Tolerance	Coup de coeur Award	Won	

== Prix Louis-Delluc ==
Year	Nominated work	Category	Result	Ref
2014	Saint Laurent	Best Film	Nominated	
2016	Nocturama	Best Film	Nominated	

== San Sebastián International Film Festival ==
Year	Nominated work	Category	Result	Ref
2016	Nocturama	Golden Shell for Best Film	Nominated	
2016	Nocturama	SIGNIS Award	Won	
2016	Sarah Winchester, Ghost Opera	Zabaltegi-Tabakalera Award	Nominated	
2019	Zombi Child	Zabaltegi-Tabakalera Award	Nominated	

== Sitges Film Festival ==
Year	Nominated work	Category	Result	Ref
2019	Zombi Child	New Visions Award - Best Film	Nominated	

== Stockholm International Film Festival ==
Year	Nominated work	Category	Result	Ref
2003	Tiresia	Bronze Horse	Nominated	

== Toronto Film Festival ==
Year	Nominated work	Category	Result	Ref
2016	Nocturama	Platform Prize	Nominated	

== Venice Film Festival ==
Year	Nominated work	Category	Result	Ref
2023	The Beast	Golden Lion	Nominated	

== Decorations ==
- Knight of the Order of Arts and Letters (2015)
