= Labèque =

Labèque (also spelled Labeque) is a French surname. Notable people with the surname include:

- Katia and Marielle Labèque, French piano duo
- Kévin Labèque (born 1991), French male track cyclist
- Louise Labèque, French actress
