= Maryna Vroda =

Ukrainian film director and screenwriter (born 1982)

- Марина Врода
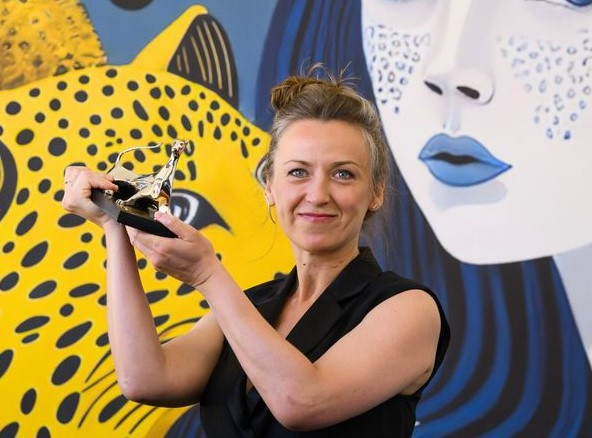
- Maryna in 2023
- Born: Vroda Maryna Anatoliivna; 22 February 1982 (age 44); Kyiv, Ukrainian SSR, Soviet Union (now Ukraine)
- Education: Kyiv National I. K. Karpenko-Kary Theatre, Cinema and Television University; Konrad Wolf Film University of Babelsberg (MA)
- Occupations: Film director and screenwriter
- Awards: see here

Maryna Anatoliivna Vroda (Note: Ukrainian: Марина Анатоліївна Врода) (born 22 February 1982) is a Ukrainian film director and screenwriter.

== Early life and education ==
Born on 22 February 1982, in the Ukrainian capital city of Kyiv. Maryna graduated from the Kyiv Secondary School No. 113, and later enrolled at the Kyiv National I. K. Karpenko-Kary Theatre, Cinema and Television University and was awarded a degree in directing, in 2007. She went to seminars led by Valery Sivak and Mykhailo Ilyenko.

== Career ==
Maryna collaborated with Sergei Loznitsa after graduating. International cinema festivals in both Eastern and Western Europe have screened her student films in 2008. She has produced a series of short films including "Forgive" (2003), "The Rain" (2007), "The Oath" (2007), and "Family Portrait" (2009). Her short film Cross-Country took home the 2011 Short Film Palme d'Or at Cannes. Vroda attended the Berlinale Talent Campus in 2010 and the Konrad Wolf Film University of Babelsberg in 2016 to pursue a master's degree. It is her feature debut, "Stepne" (2023).

After accepting the Locarno Critics' Prize and Best Director Award, Maryna presented her idea for the film to the Seminci before going in front of the public. According to her, "Stepne" is an emotion that came from the "feeling that she had lost a country," Ukraine, and it is what motivated her to "return home." In November 2023, her film "Stepne" takes home the Best Feature award at Scanorama. At Italy's 35th Trieste International Film Festival, Maryna's film "Stepne" won an award. Her debut movie was recognized by the jury for its moving portrayal of a collapsing nation, which skillfully combined sweetness with sincerity to explore themes of suffering and dashed dreams.

== Political positions ==
Maryna declined the Kinoshock film festival award in September 2015 to show her support for Ukrainian filmmaker Oleh Sentsov, who is imprisoned in Russia. She backed an open letter sent in June 2018 to international leaders by lawmakers, human rights advocates, and cultural leaders urging them to stand up for Sentsov and other political prisoners.

== Personal life ==
Maryna presently splits her time between Berlin and Kyiv. Her grandpa, who was incarcerated by the German troops during the Second World War.

== Filmography ==
Year	Title	Genre	Notes
2003	Forgive	Short Film	
2006	Family Portrait	Short Film	
2007	The Rain	Short Film	
2007	The Vow	Short Film	
2011	Cross-Country	Short Film	Director and screenplay
2014	Snails		
2015	Penguin		
2017	The Oath	Short Film	
2022	Himmel & Erde - Небо та Земля	TV Series	
2023	Stepne	Feature Film	Screenwriter, producer and editor

=== Cross-Country ===
Cross-Country (French: Cross, Ukrainian: «Крос») is a French-Ukrainian short drama film, directed by Vroda and released in 2011. The film centres on a group of teenagers as they participate in a cross-country run, with one boy (Egor Agarkov) splitting off from the class to run on his own and experiencing very different visions of adult life outside of school.

The film premiered at the 2011 Cannes Film Festival, where it was the winner of the Short Film Palme d'Or.

== Awards and recognitions ==
On the Day of Ukrainian Cinema, President Volodymyr Zelenskyy signed a decree (No.465/2023) naming Maryna as the Honored Artist of Ukraine and bestowing state medals to notable cinema professionals.

Award	Year	Category	Nominated work	Result
Cannes Film Festival	2011	Short Film Palme d'Or	Cross-Country	Won
Grimme Award	2023	Fiction	Himmel & Erde - Небо та Земля	Nominated
Locarno Film Festival	2023	Best Director	Stepne	Won
Scanorama	2023	Best Feature	Stepne	Won
