= Josée Deshaies =

French-Canadian cinematographer

- Born: Montreal, Canada
- Occupation: Cinematographer
- Years active: 1996–present

Josée Deshaies (French: [ʒoze deɛ]) is a French-Canadian cinematographer. She is known for her frequent collaborations with filmmaker Bertrand Bonello. She has been nominated twice for the César Award for Best Cinematography.

== Filmography ==
Year	Title	Notes
1996	Qui je suis	Short film
1998	Something Organic	
2000	The Left-Hand Side of the Fridge (La Moitié gauche du frigo)	
2001	The Pornographer	
2002	Royal Bonbon	
2002	The Adventures of James and David	Short film
2003	Tiresia	
2005	Les invisibles	
2005	Peekaboo	
2005	Cindy: The Doll Is Mine	Short film
2006	Le jour de ma mort	Short film
2006	L'immature	Short film
2006	My New Picture	Short film
2007	Deux cages sans oiseaux	Short film
2007	A l'instar du père Noël et de la pizza	Short film
2007	Heartbeat Detector	
2007	Before I Forget	
2007	24 Bars	
2008	On War	
2008	All That She Wants (Elle veut le chaos)	
2009	Yuki & Nina	
2010	Rebecca H. (Return to the Dogs)	
2010	Where the Boys Are	Short film
2010	Curling	
2010	La lisière	
2011	House of Tolerance	Nominated—César Award for Best Cinematography
2011	Headwinds	
2012	Ingrid Caven: Music and Voice	
2012	Next to Last (Autumn 63)	Short film
2013	An Extraordinary Person (Quelqu'un d'extraordinaire)	Short film
2013	Septième Promenade	Short film
2014	Jacky in the Kingdom of Women	
2014	Saint Laurent	Nominated—César Award for Best Cinematography; Nominated—Lumière Award for Best Cinematography
2014	I, Kamikaze (Parole de kamikaze)	Documentary
2015	Spectrographies	
2015	Lamb	
2015	Endorphine	
2016	Nelly	Nominated—Canadian Screen Award for Best Cinematography; Nominated—Prix Iris for Cinematography
2021	Big Giant Wave (Comme une vague)	Winner – Prix Iris for Best Cinematography in a Documentary (with Tobie Marier Robitaille)
2022	Babysitter	
2022	Continental Drift (South)	
2023	Passages	
2023	The Beast	
2024	In His Own Image	
2025	Urchin	
2026	The Man I Love	
