= Coma (2022 film) =

2022 French film by Bertrand Bonello

- Theatrical release poster
- Directed by: Bertrand Bonello
- Screenplay by: Bertrand Bonello
- Produced by: Justin Taurand; Bertrand Bonello; Felix de Givry; Ugo Bienvenu
- Starring: Julia Faure; Gaspard Ulliel; Laetitia Casta; Vincent Lacoste; Louis Garrel; Anaïs Demoustier; Louise Labèque
- Cinematography: Antoine Parouty
- Edited by: Gabrielle Stemmer
- Music by: Bertrand Bonello
- Production companies: Les Films du Bélier; My New Picture; Remembers Production
- Distributed by: New Story
- Release dates: 12 February 2022 (Berlin Film Festival); 16 November 2022 (France)
- Running time: 80 minutes
- Country: France
- Language: French
- Budget: €250,000

Coma is a 2022 French film written and directed by Bertrand Bonello. Combining animation and live action, it tells the story of a teenage girl who is locked in her house during a global health crisis and navigates between dreams and reality, until she starts following a disturbing and mysterious YouTuber named Patricia Coma. It stars Louise Labèque, Julia Faure, Gaspard Ulliel, Laetitia Casta, Vincent Lacoste, Louis Garrel and Anaïs Demoustier. Coma was the last film Ulliel worked in before his death.

Coma made its world premiere on 12 February 2022 at the 72nd Berlin International Film Festival, where it competed in the Encounters section and won the FIPRESCI Award for Best Film. It was released in theaters in France by New Story on 16 November 2022.

== Cast ==
- Julia Faure as Patricia Coma
- Louise Labèque as The teenager
- Gaspard Ulliel as Scott (voice)
- Laetitia Casta as Sharon (voice)
- Vincent Lacoste as Nicholas (voice)
- Louis Garrel as Dr. Ballard (voice)
- Anaïs Demoustier as Ashley (voice)

== Production ==
=== Development ===
On 24 December 2021, French website Chaos Reign reported that director Bertrand Bonello had just finished a surprise film titled "Coma" before shooting the film The Beast. The film was produced by Les Films du Bélier and My New Picture in co-production with Remembers Production.

Bonello described Coma as the last installment of his trilogy on youth, which started with Nocturama (2016), and was followed by Zombi Child (2019). Bonello wrote the screenplay for Coma during France's January 2021 COVID-19 lockdown, shooting in his own house with a small crew and limited means. Bonello also composed the film's score. The film was shot in twelve days. Julia Faure filmed all of her scenes in only six days with a small crew of seven people and without a boom operator. Coma mixes digital video, 2D and 3D animation, and archival footage. The film is dedicated to, and inspired by Bonello's then-18-year-old daughter, Anna.

The origin of Coma was a short film that Bonello did during the first lockdown for Fondazione Prada, Où en êtes-vous? (Numéro 2), which became the prologue to Coma, the letter to his daughter. Bonello said that a lecture by French philosopher Gilles Deleuze ("Beware of the dreams of others, because if you are caught in their dream, you are done for"), made him take the letter and the prologue one step further and to imagine a girl's psyche. It also inspired him to do exactly the opposite of what Deleuze says: "Let us be caught in the dream of the other and see what happens", Bonello said.

In an interview conducted in July 2022, Bonello said he does not rule out giving a sequel to Coma.

=== Casting ===
Coma was Bertrand Bonello's second collaboration with Gaspard Ulliel and Louis Garrel after the 2014 biopic Saint Laurent, and also his second collaboration with Louise Labèque after the 2019 film Zombi Child.

Bonello wanted very recognizable voices for the dolls, so that they would quickly have an identity for the viewer. He called on Laetitia Casta, Gaspard Ulliel, Anaïs Demoustier, Vincent Lacoste and Louis Garrel. "All five came to my house, I made coffee, in one morning everything was over. Beyond the very playful side of it all, I helped them to play everything with a first degree which allowed a very simple emotion in the scenes. And a comic effect", Bonello said.

Gaspard Ulliel, who voiced the doll Scott, died following a skiing accident on 19 January 2022. The same day as Ulliel's death, Coma was announced as one of the films selected for the Berlin Film Festival. Ulliel's role in Coma was kept a secret until the film's official plot and full cast were revealed on 2 February 2022, making it the first film released after his death - following its premiere at the Berlin Film Festival on 12 February 2022, despite being the last one he filmed, as it was finished in December 2021, a month before his death.

Ulliel had recently died when Bonello was editing the film. Bonello told Variety: "I was alone in a screening room, and Gaspard had just died, and when I heard his voice resonating in the room it was like a haunting. I thought about some lines from the letter to my daughter where I talk about those we've lost. The film is called 'Coma' and has scenes in a forest that connects the living and the dead. So watching it again felt uncanny. Gaspard resonated throughout."

== Marketing ==
The first image featuring Louise Labèque, the full cast and plot details were revealed on 2 February 2022. Two clips from the film titled "Catatonie" and "Cullen" were released on 10 February 2022. The clip titled "Cullen" featured the voices of Gaspard Ulliel and Laetitia Casta as the dolls Scott and Sharon, respectively.

Belgian sales company Best Friend Forever released a poster and an exclusive 20-second teaser trailer for the film on their Instagram account on 11 February 2022.

On 16 February 2022, Best Friend Forever released on their Instagram account a new 9-second clip featuring Louise Labèque playing an electronic device similar to Rubik's Cube.

New Story released a new poster for the film on their official website in early October 2022. The film's official trailer was released on New Story's social media on 14 October 2022.

== Release ==
On 2 February 2022, it was reported that Brussels-based company Best Friend Forever had acquired the film.

The film had its world premiere in the 'Encounters' section at the 72nd Berlin International Film Festival on 12 February 2022. It made its North American premiere at the 60th New York Film Festival in the 'Currents' section on 1 October 2022, and was screened at the 2022 BFI London Film Festival in the 'Dare' section on 5 October 2022.

New Story released the film in theaters in France on 16 November 2022. The film will be released on DVD on 22 March 2023.

Film Movement bought distribution rights for North America, releasing the film in select theaters in the United States on 17 May 2024, and on their streaming platform on 10 September 2024.

== Reception ==
Rotten Tomatoes gives the film a score of 76% based on 25 reviews, with a weighted average of 6.7/10. Film Comment ranked the film number two on its list of "Best Undistributed Films of 2022". The Film Stage also included Coma on its list of "The Best Undistributed Films of 2022".

Fabien Lemercier of Cineuropa wrote; "It is an invisible, poetic, philosophico-chaotic map that Bertrand Bonello draws in Coma, an immersive experience of recentring of the self between life and death, a fragmentary essay about change, an indirect portrait of a young generation suffering, a cryptic dispatch of coded messages preparing for dawn at the heart of the cannibalistic night of the world", and "Those baffled by Coma, will no doubt get another chance in the future to rewatch what will inevitably become a cult film."

Rafaela Sales Ross of The Playlist wrote; "In an oversaturated market for pandemic-themed films, "Coma" is a delirious marvel of a reminder that, in the right hands, there is no such thing as an unfeasible subject."

Anna Smith of Deadline wrote; "Bonello calls this film a "little gesture," and in many ways it feels like an intimate story. But its wider resonance makes it a topical and quietly thought-provoking watch."

Cédric Succivalli of International Cinephile Society wrote that "Coma is a neo-Lynchian slow burn masterpiece that will wow those willing to embark on its tumultuous journey with its mise en abymes and epiphanies of visual ecstasy. It's a near impossible patchwork film to grasp at first sight and will require multiple viewings undoubtedly, but it should obtain cult status over time. Coma's final ten minutes are already in my all-time pantheon of best finales ever, echoing the finale of Terrence Malick's Tree of Life ten years later with melancholy and despair." Succivalli also praised Julia Faure's performance by saying; "what a treasure of an actress the underrated Julia Faure is in the cosmos of contemporary French cinema. She brings warmth, sensuousness and iconoclasm to an emotional rollercoaster of a story that needed her like champagne needs bubbles", and the late Gaspard Ulliel as the doll Scott, "whose smooth voice cannot but break our hearts".

== Awards and nominations ==
Year	Award / Festival	Category	Recipient(s)	Result	Ref.
2022	Berlin Film Festival	Encounters	Bertrand Bonello	Nominated	
2022	Berlin Film Festival	FIPRESCI Award for Best Film in the Encounters section	Bertrand Bonello	Won	
2022	Istanbul Film Festival	Golden Tulip	Bertrand Bonello	Nominated	
2022	Las Palmas de Gran Canaria Film Festival	Golden Lady Harimaguada Award for Best Feature Film	Bertrand Bonello	Nominated	
2022	Longtake Interactive Film Festival	Best Film	Bertrand Bonello	Nominated	
2023	International Cinephile Society Awards	Best Picture	Coma	Nominated	
2023	International Cinephile Society Awards	Best Production Design	Anna Bonello, Gaston Portejoie, Daphné Yvon	Nominated	
