= Mohammedreza Eslamloo =

Mohammedreza Eslamloo (محمدرضا‌ اسالملو‌) (born in 1947, in Shiraz) graduated in Television and Film from the College of Communications of the University of Texas. He worked for the construction jihad unit and the Islamic combatants department at IRIB, and at the Iranian Art Institute. He was a teacher at the School of Television in Tehran.

Known for his pro-Khomeini political documentaries, he has nonetheless maintained independence from the state, declining to serve as an official artist for the Iranian government while continuing to question political authority in Iran.

Eslamloo made a docudrama on the event of September 11: "The 9/11 Black Box." The main actor in this political movie received the Special Award for Human Rights at the 29th Fajr Film Festival (2011). This film represented Iran at the 64th Cannes Film Festival (May 2011).

== Major short films ==
- [Hodood-e Tarikh] "The Limits of History" (cinematographer, 1982)
- [Abadan Shahr-e Mazloom] "Abadan, the City that Suffered" (+ cinematographer and editor, 1982)
- [Bar Faraz-e Fav] "Over Fav" (+ writer, director of photography, and editor, 1982)
- [Az Kheibar ta Karbala] "From Kheibar to Karbala (+ cinematographer and editor, 1987)
- [Emrooz Felestin, Choobha-ye Khoshk] "Palestine Today, Dry Pieces of Wood" (+ editor and assistant cinematographer, 1988)

== Major films ==
- The Passage (1986)
- Fright (1987)
- Seyyed's Garden (1989)
- [Mosalmanan] "Moslems" (1994)
- [Mosalmanan] "Moslems" (second series, 1995)
- The 9/11 Black Box (2011)
