= House of Tolerance =

2011 film by Bertrand Bonello

- French theatrical release poster
- French: L'Apollonide: Souvenirs de la maison close
- Directed by: Bertrand Bonello
- Written by: Bertrand Bonello
- Produced by: Kristina Larsen; Bertrand Bonello
- Starring: Hafsia Herzi; Céline Sallette; Jasmine Trinca; Adèle Haenel; Alice Barnole; Iliana Zabeth; Noémie Lvovsky
- Cinematography: Josée Deshaies
- Edited by: Fabrice Rouaud
- Music by: Bertrand Bonello
- Production companies: Les Films du Lendemain; My New Picture; Arte France Cinéma
- Distributed by: Haut et Court
- Release dates: 16 May 2011 (Cannes); 21 September 2011 (France)
- Running time: 125 minutes
- Country: France
- Language: French
- Budget: €3.8 million
- Box office: $1.4 million

House of Tolerance (French: L'Apollonide: Souvenirs de la maison close, also known as House of Pleasures) is a 2011 French drama film written and directed by Bertrand Bonello, starring Hafsia Herzi, Céline Sallette, Jasmine Trinca, Adèle Haenel, Alice Barnole, Iliana Zabeth and Noémie Lvovsky. The film had its world premiere in the Competition section of the Cannes Film Festival on 16 May 2011.

== Plot ==
The story is set in a luxurious Parisian brothel (a 'maison close', like Le Chabanais) in the early 20th century. It explores the restricted lives of a group of prostitutes: their rivalries, hopes, fears, pleasures and pains.

== Cast ==
- Céline Sallette as Clotilde
- Hafsia Herzi as Samira
- Jasmine Trinca as Julie
- Adèle Haenel as Léa
- Alice Barnole as Madeleine
- Iliana Zabeth as Pauline
- Noémie Lvovsky as Marie-France
- Louis-Do de Lencquesaing as Michaux
- Xavier Beauvois as Jacques
- Jacques Nolot as Maurice
- Esther Garrel as a prostitute

== Production ==
The genesis of the project was a merge of two film ideas Bertrand Bonello had been thinking of. About ten years earlier, he had tried to make a film about modern brothels, but the project had been cancelled. After finishing On War (2008), Bonello decided that he wanted his next film to be about dynamics within a group of women, and his partner suggested a film about prostitutes in a historical setting. The director then became interested in the aspect of a brothel as a closed world from the viewpoint of the prostitutes. The idea of a scar in the form of a smile came from the film The Man Who Laughs (1928), an adaptation of Victor Hugo's novel with the same name. Bonello says he dreamed about the film two nights in a row while he was writing House of Tolerance, and decided to include a female character with such a scar.

The film was a co-production between Les Films du Lendemain and the director's company My New Picture, in collaboration with Arte France Cinéma. The production received €540,000 from the Centre national du cinéma et de l'image animée (CNC) and €416,000 from the Île-de-France region, as well as pre-sales investment from Canal+ and CinéCinéma. The total budget was €3.8 million. Casting took almost nine months. Bonello wanted a mixed ensemble of both professionals and amateurs who above all worked well together as a group.

Filming started in Saint-Rémy-lès-Chevreuse on 31 May 2010 and lasted eight weeks. The film was recorded on one continuous set, which allowed the camera to move between each room without cuts. Bonello chose to focus the camera on the girls and almost never their clients. He explained: "it reinforces the impression that the prostitute is above the client. I told the actresses: 'Be careful, I want twelve intelligent girls.' It was really important for me: they're not being fooled, they are strong women."

== Release ==
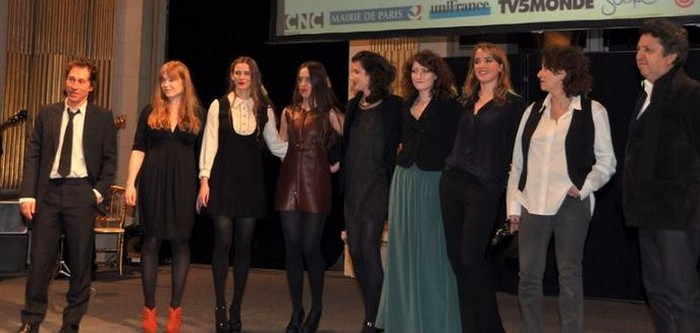
Bertrand Bonello, Iliana Zabeth, Pauline Jacquard, Maïa Sandoz, Judith Lou Lévy, Alice Barnole, Adèle Haenel, Noémie Lvovsky, and unidentified person at the 17th Lumière Awards

The film had its world premiere at the 2011 Cannes Film Festival in the Competition section on 16 May 2011. It was the fourth time a film by Bonello was screened at the festival, and the second time in the main competition, following Tiresia (2003). It was released in France by Haut et Court on 21 September 2011.

== Reception ==
=== Critical reception ===
On the review aggregator website Rotten Tomatoes, 83% of 30 critics' reviews are positive, with an average rating of 7.2/10. The website's consensus reads: "An atmospheric study of the world of brothels, House of Tolerance digs beyond the corseted courtesans and lingers like the languid days it depicts." On Metacritic, which assigns a normalized rating, the film has a score 75 out of 100, based on nine critics, indicating "generally favorable reviews".

Phil Coldiron of Slant gave the film four out of four stars, writing: "Not many films have ever approached the possibilities afforded by the slippery subjectivity of cinematic time so directly, or with such intelligence." Roger Ebert gave the film 3.5 out of four stars, describing it as "a morose elegy to the decline of a luxurious Parisian bordello, circa 1900, a closed world in which prostitutes and their clients glide like sleepwalkers through the motions of sex."

=== Accolades ===
Award	Date of ceremony	Category	Recipient(s)	Result	Ref(s)
Lumière Awards	13 January 2012	Best Film	House of Tolerance	Nominated	
Lumière Awards	13 January 2012	Best Director	Bertrand Bonello	Nominated	
Lumière Awards	13 January 2012	Best Screenplay	Bertrand Bonello	Nominated	
Lumière Awards	13 January 2012	Most Promising Actress	Alice Barnole, Adèle Haenel, Céline Sallette	Won	
César Award	24 February 2012	Best Supporting Actress	Noémie Lvovsky	Nominated	
César Award	24 February 2012	Most Promising Actress	Adèle Haenel, Céline Sallette	Nominated	
César Award	24 February 2012	Best Cinematography	Josée Deshaies	Nominated	
César Award	24 February 2012	Best Original Music	Bertrand Bonello	Nominated	
César Award	24 February 2012	Best Sound	Jean-Pierre Duret, Nicolas Moreau, Jean-Pierre Laforce	Nominated	
César Award	24 February 2012	Best Costume Design	Anaïs Romand	Won	
César Award	24 February 2012	Best Production Design	Alain Guffroy	Nominated	
