= A Girl's Story (film) =

2026 French drama film

- French: Mémoire de fille
- Directed by: Judith Godrèche
- Written by: Judith Godrèche
- Based on: Mémoire de fille by Annie Ernaux
- Produced by: Carole Lambert; Marc Missonnier
- Starring: Tess Barthélémy; Valérie Dréville; Victor Bonnel; Ariane Labed; Maïwène Barthelemy; Anja Verderosa; Louise Labèque
- Cinematography: Joachim Philippe
- Edited by: Guillaume Lauras
- Music by: Faux Amis
- Production companies: Windy Production; Moana Films
- Distributed by: Jour2Fête
- Release date: 16 May 2026 (Cannes)
- Running time: 117 minutes
- Country: France
- Language: French

A Girl's Story (French: Mémoire de fille) is a 2026 French drama film written and directed by Judith Godrèche, and based on the autobiographical novel of the same name by Annie Ernaux. It follows French author Ernaux traveling back to her hometown of Rouen.

The film had its world premiere in the Un Certain Regard section of the 2026 Cannes Film Festival on 16 May. It will be theatrically released in France by Jour2Fête on 30 September.

== Plot ==
In 2020, the author Annie Ernaux travels to her hometown of Rouen for a book signing. During the trip, she is reminded of her youth in 1958 and the sexual violence she experienced while working at a summer camp.

== Cast ==
- Tess Barthélémy as Annie in 1958
- Valérie Dréville as Annie in 2020
- Victor Bonnel as H
- Ariane Labed as Blanche Duchesne
- Maïwène Barthelemy as Claudine
- Anja Verderosa as Catherine
- Louise Labèque as Jeannie
- Manon Valentin as Monique
- Esther Archambault as Marie-Thérèse
- Mamadou Sidibé as Pierre
- Thibault Bonenfant as Jean-Marie
- Lancelot Courciéras as Jacques
- Francois-Xavier Raffier as Guy
- Léa Léviant as Odette
- Guslagie Malanda as Rose
- Séphora Pondi as the actress
- Georgia Scalliet
- Marie Bucas-Français as Renée
- Loïc Corbery
- Victoire Du Bois
- Sophie-Marie Larrouy
- Imraan Afkir
- Vittoria Andreoli
- Padrig Vion

== Production ==
A Girl's Story is the second feature film directed by Judith Godrèche, after Toutes les filles pleurent (2010). While she did not envision the film as a biopic, Godrèche consulted Ernaux throughout the production. Like the novel, the film is divided between two timelines, contemporary for Annie Ernaux's book signing session, and in her memories of the summer camp in 1958, when she was 18 years old.

Produced by Carole Lambert for Windy Production and Marc Missonnier for Moana Films, it's co-produced by La Chambre Rose, France 2 Cinéma and the Belgian company Umedia. It is also supported by the Île-de-France and Normandy regions.

Principal photography began on 20 October in Île-de-France, notably in the former AgroParisTech institute in Thiverval-Grignon in the Yvelines, and wrapped on 30 November.

Tess Barthélémy is Godrèche's daughter and had already starred in her mother's short film Moi aussi (2024).

== Release ==
A Girl's Story debuted on 16 May 2026 in the Un Certain Regard section of the 79th Cannes Film Festival. It will be theatrically released in France by Jour2Fête on 30 September.

== Awards and nominations ==
Year	Award	Category	Nominee	Result	Ref.
2026	Cannes Film Festival	Un Certain Regard	Judith Godrèche	Nominated	
