= Maïwène Barthelemy =

French actress (born 2002)

Maïwène Barthélémy, born in 2002 in Raincourt, Haute-Saône, is a French actress.

== Biography ==
Maïwène Barthélémy pursued a BTS in animal production at Vesoul AgroCampus following her baccalaureate.

Initially uninvolved in the film industry, she participated in the casting for Vingt Dieux along with her classmates. The film, directed by Louise Courvoisier, follows a young man from Jura who, after leading a carefree lifestyle, is compelled to take responsibility for his own livelihood. In the film, Barthélémy portrays a farmer who becomes romantically interested in the protagonist as he sets out to compete in a regional contest for the best Comté cheese.

Vingt Dieux was screened in the Un Certain Regard section at the 2024 Cannes Film Festival, where it received the Prix de la Jeunesse. At the 50th César Awards, the film received four nominations, with Barthélémy winning the award for Best Female Revelation.

== Filmography ==
Year	Title	Role
2024	Vingt Dieux	Marie-Lise
2026	A Girl's Story	Claudine
