= Okhotnik =

Okhotnik (Russian: Охотник, lit. 'Hunter') may refer to:

- The Hunter (2011 Russian film)
- Aero-Astra Okhotnik, a Russian autogyro
- Vladimir Okhotnik (born 1950), French chess grandmaster
- Okhotnik class, a Russian destroyer class
- Rubin-class patrol boat, a Russian patrol boat class
- Sukhoi S-70 Okhotnik, a Russian stealth unmanned combat aerial vehicle (UCAV)
