= A Villa in Los Angeles =

- Directed by: Aliocha
- Written by: Aliocha
- Starring: Jean-Louis Coulloc'h; Vincent Guédon; Pascal Leduc; Valère Leduc; Pablo Saavedra
- Cinematography: Pierre-Alain Giraud
- Edited by: Aliocha; Julie Duclaux
- Release date: 21 November 2013
- Running time: 80 minutes
- Country: France
- Language: French

A Villa in Los Angeles (Une villa à Los Angeles) is a French Comedy drama. It is the first feature film written and directed by Aliocha.

== Plot ==
A father, his son and some friends spend a weekend by the sea, but relationships worsen and tensions rise to the rhythm of the ever-changing tides.

== Cast ==
- Jean-Louis Coulloc'h as Jean-Louis
- Vincent Guédon as Vincent
- Pascal Leduc as Pascal
- Valère Leduc as Valère
- Pablo Saavedra as Pablo
- Susan Jane Aufray as Sue, Jean-Louis' friend
