= Cindy: The Doll Is Mine =

2005 short film by Bertrand Bonello

- Directed by: Bertrand Bonello
- Written by: Bertrand Bonello
- Produced by: Olivier Broche; François Magal
- Starring: Asia Argento
- Cinematography: Josée Deshaies
- Edited by: Fabrice Rouaud
- Music by: Blonde Redhead
- Distributed by: MK2 Diffusion
- Release dates: 19 May 2005 (Cannes); 28 September 2005 (France)
- Running time: 15 minutes
- Country: France
- Language: English

Cindy: The Doll Is Mine is a short film written and directed by French director Bertrand Bonello.

It stars Italian actress Asia Argento in the double role of photographer Cindy Sherman, a brunette, and her model, a blonde who strangely resemble one another.

The film was screened out of competition at the 2005 Cannes Film Festival.

== Cast ==
- Asia Argento as Cindy Sherman / The model
