= The Agony and Sweat of the Human Spirit =

- Directed by: Joe Bookman; D. Jesse Damazo
- Written by: Joe Bookman; D. Jesse Damazo
- Starring: Joe Bookman; D. Jesse Damazo
- Cinematography: Richard Wiebe; Florina Titz; Laura Iancu; Craig Webster
- Edited by: Joe Bookman; D. Jesse Damazo
- Music by: D. Jesse Damazo
- Release date: May 18, 2011 (Cannes)
- Running time: 15 minutes
- Country: United States
- Language: English

The Agony and Sweat of the Human Spirit is a 2011 short film by D. Jesse Damazo and Joe Bookman. It was screened at the 2011 Cannes Film Festival in the Cinéfondation section. The film was made as part of the directors' coursework at The University of Iowa. The title is a reference to William Faulkner's Nobel Prize acceptance speech. The film consists of only five shots, each lasting several minutes.

== Premise ==
A quiet ukulele player and his talkative manager struggle to realize their artistic vision in a comic story of loss and friendship.

== Cast ==
- Joe Bookman as The Manager
- D. Jesse Damazo as The Ukuleleist
