= Bake a Cake =

- Directed by: Aliocha
- Written by: Aliocha
- Starring: Jean-Louis Coulloc'h; Sid Amiri; Frode Bjornstad; Jean-Pierre Dalaise; Benjamin Fanni; Pablo Saavedra
- Cinematography: Olivier Strauss
- Release date: August 29, 2012 (Montréal World Film Festival)
- Running time: 13 minutes
- Country: France
- Language: French

Bake a Cake is a 2012 short film written and directed by Aliocha. It won the 'Aprile' award at the 2012 Milano Film Festival.

== Plot ==
Six men gather to spend an evening together and tongues loosen.

== Cast ==
- Jean-Louis Coulloc'h - Jean-Louis
- Sid Amiri - Sid
- Frode Bjornstad - Frode
- Jean-Pierre Dalaise - Jean-Pierre
- Benjamin Fanni - Benjamin
- Pablo Saavedra - Pablo
