= Las Acacias (film) =

2011 film

- Film poster
- Directed by: Pablo Giorgelli
- Written by: Pablo Giorgelli; Salvador Roselli
- Produced by: Veronica Cura; Ariel Rotter; Alex Zito; Pablo Giorgelli; Eduardo Carneros; Esteban Ibarrexte
- Starring: Germán de Silva; Hebe Duarte
- Cinematography: Diego Poleri
- Edited by: Maria Astrauskas
- Release dates: 13 May 2011 (Cannes); 24 November 2011 (Argentina)
- Running time: 96 minutes
- Country: Argentina
- Language: Spanish

Las Acacias is a 2011 Argentine drama film directed by Pablo Giorgelli. The film won the Caméra d'Or at the 2011 Cannes Film Festival.

== Plot ==
Rubén is a middle-aged Argentinian truck driver transporting timber between Paraguay and Buenos Aires, Argentina. One day, at a truck stop, he picks up a young Paraguayan woman, Jacinta, whom his employer had told to take to Buenos Aires. To Rubén's surprise, Jacinta brings along her five-month-old daughter, Anahí.

Rubén makes little conversation at the start of the journey. At a border crossing, Jacinta tells the guard she is visiting her cousin on a three-month visa, though she later explains to Rubén her cousin will help her find a job in Buenos Aires. Soon Jacinta's baby needs feeding and they pull over at a truck stop. Rubén considers buying a bus ticket for Jacinta, but changes his mind after learning the next bus is not until tomorrow. They continue their journey on through the night. When Rubén nearly falls asleep at the wheel, Jacinta suggests they should pull over for the night to rest.

The next day, Rubén stops at a small town to visit his sister and give her a belated birthday present. The sister is not home, but Jacinta states she is not in a hurry, so they spend a few hours by a nearby lake. They return to Rubén's sister's house, where Rubén gives his sibling his present, and they continue with the drive to Buenos Aires. When they get there, Rubén drops Jacinta off at her cousin's house. She is met by several relatives who are happy to see her and Anahí.

Giving his goodbyes, Rubén suggests Jacinta join him on his next trip the following week, and she agrees.

== Cast ==
- Germán de Silva as Rubén
- Hebe Duarte as Jacinta
- Nayra Calle Mamani as Anahí

== Reception ==
The film received a 75 percent positive rating on the film-critics aggregate site Rotten Tomatoes, based on 12 review with an average rating of 7/10, following its US release on 7 September 2012.

Variety, reviewing the film in 2011 at the Cannes Film Festival, called it a "[d]elicate yet rigorously executed", and said the film represented "a master class in low-key but wholly effective [acting], as characters played by German De Silva and Hebe Duarte get to know each other via dialogue that would barely cover 20 written pages. Slow-burning pic takes a while to warm up, but once it gets going, it's a corker that could enchant as an ultra-niche release...." Jeannette Catsoulis of The New York Times said, "The very definition of modest, Las Acacias articulates emotional transformation with simplicity and grace. Rarely has a film managed to say so much while saying so little." In the UK, critic Peter Bradshaw of The Guardian said the film "unfolds almost wordlessly, but very eloquently, and the unforced performances of its two leads make it absolutely beguiling." However, Keith Uhlich of Time Out New York, while giving it three of five stars, called the film "charming yet slight" and that it "at worst, comes off as more piddling romantic comedy than penetrating character study."

== Awards ==
The film won the Caméra d'Or at the 2011 Cannes Film Festival and the Silver Condor for Best Film at the Argentinean Film Critics Association Awards.

Awards/Festival	Category	Winner/Nominee	Won
Argentinean Film Critics Association Awards	Silver Condor – Best Film	Pablo Giorgelli	Yes
Argentinean Film Critics Association Awards	Silver Condor – Best Editing	María Astrauskas	Yes
Argentinean Film Critics Association Awards	Silver Condor – Best Cinematography	Diego Poleri	No
Argentinean Film Critics Association Awards	Silver Condor – Best Director	Pablo Giorgelli	No
Argentinean Film Critics Association Awards	Silver Condor – Best First Film	Pablo Giorgelli	No
Argentinean Film Critics Association Awards	Silver Condor – Best New Actor	Germán de Silva	No
Argentinean Film Critics Association Awards	Silver Condor – Best New Actress	Hebe Duarte	No
Argentinean Film Critics Association Awards	Silver Condor – Best Screenplay	Pablo Giorgelli, Salvador Roselli	No
Argentinean Film Critics Association Awards	Silver Condor – Best Sound	Martin Litmanovich	No
Bratislava International Film Festival	Grand Prix	Pablo Giorgelli	Yes
Bratislava International Film Festival	FIPRESCI Prize	Pablo Giorgelli	Yes
Cannes Film Festival	Caméra d'Or	Pablo Giorgelli	Yes
Cannes Film Festival	ACID Award	Pablo Giorgelli	Yes
Cannes Film Festival	Young Critics Award	Pablo Giorgelli	Yes
