= Julia Faure =

French actress

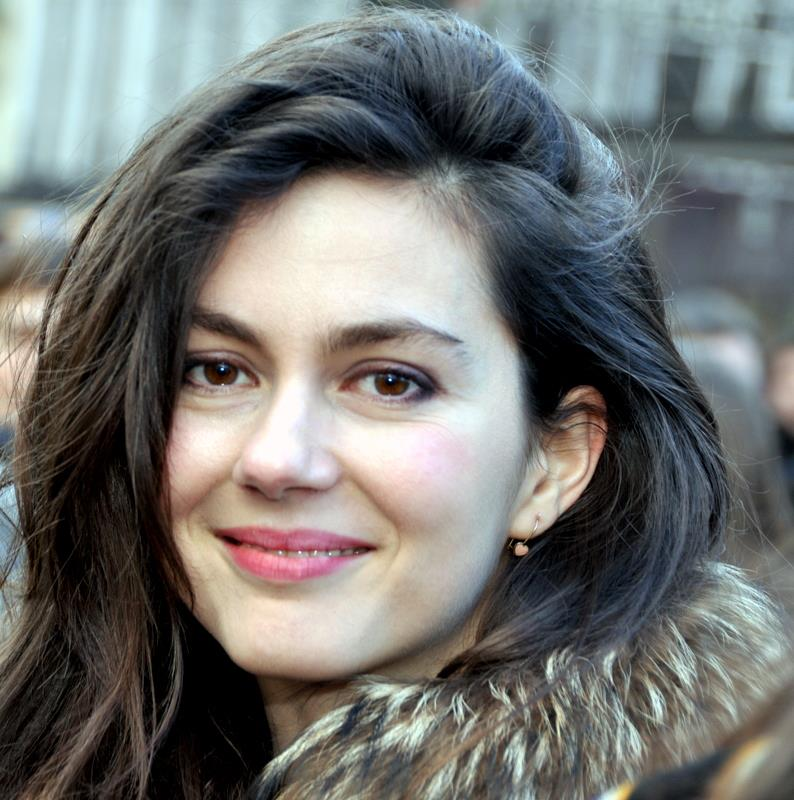
- Faure in 2013
- Born: 13 February 1977 (age 49); France
- Occupation: Actress
- Years active: 2001–present

Julia Faure (born 13 February 1977) is a French actress. She has appeared in films such as Wild Innocence (2001), Love Me If You Dare (2003), Camille Rewinds (2012), and Coma (2022). She has also appeared in the television shows Au nom de la vérité and I Love You 2.

== Selected filmography ==
=== Film ===
Year	Title	Role	Notes
2001	Wild Innocence	Lucie	
2003	Love Me If You Dare	Sophie's Sister	
2004	Process	Actress	
2005	Les Invisibles	Assistant Sound Engineer	
2006	Incontrôlable	Rose	
2009	An Organization of Dreams	Sister	
2012	Camille Rewinds	Louise	
2014	À coup sûr	Agathe	
2014	Pause	Julia	
2016	Les Naufragés	Rosario	
2016	Tout de suite maintenant	Maya	
2017	All That Divides Us	Patricia	
2019	Deerskin	Victim 4	
2020	Éléonore	Honorine	
2021	On est fait pour s'entendre	Florence	
2021	Sans toi		
2022	Coma	Patricia Coma	
2022	Jour de gloire	Anna	
2022	Smoking Causes Coughing	Child's Mother	
2023	The Beast	Sophie	
2026	Maigret and the Dead Lover	Juliette	

=== Short films ===
Year	Title	Role	Notes
2003	Julia et les hommes	Julia	
2004	Ce qui nous lie		
2006	Le funambule		
2009	Alice & the Bear	Alice	
2010	Child Play	Enigma	
2011	La dernière nuit	Mélanie	
2013	Océan	Sylvie	
2013	Ma nuit n'est pas la vôtre	Constance	
2014	Jardin d'hiver	Anne	
2018	Petites Filles	Caroline	
2019	Une habitude de jeune homme	Fanny	
2023	Dilemne, Dilemme	Dana	

=== Television ===
Year	Title	Role	Notes
2012	Au nom de la vérité	Élodie	Episode: "Un odieux trafic"
2016	La Face	Mélanie Florian	TV movie
2017–2018	J'ai deux amours	Louise	Miniseries
2019	Le Grand Bazar	Sara	4 episodes
2019	La Forêt d'Argent	Elizabeth	TV movie
2019–2021	Mythomaniac	Isa	10 episodes
2020	No Man's Land	Lorraine	2 episodes
2022	La Fille au cœur de cochon	Sabrina	

== Awards and nominations ==
Awards and nominations for Julia Faure
Award	Date of ceremony	Category	Title	Result	Ref.
Lumière Awards	18 January 2013	Most Promising Actress (shared with Judith Chemla and India Hair)	Camille Rewinds	Won	
César Awards	22 February 2013	Most Promising Actress	Camille Rewinds	Nominated	
