= The Guidance of Reason =

- Directed by: Aliocha
- Written by: Aliocha
- Starring: Jean-François Brunier; Athos
- Cinematography: Alessio Rigo de Righi
- Release date: October 11, 2010 (Paris)
- Running time: 21 minutes
- Country: France
- Language: French

The Guidance of Reason (French: La conduite de la Raison) is a short film written and directed by Aliocha. It has been selected to be part of the Directors Fortnight of the 2011 Cannes Film Festival.

== Plot ==
A man and his dog go for a walk in the woods.

== Cast ==
- Jean-François Brunier - Jean-François Brunier
- Athos - Dog
- Jean-Pierre Dalaise - Jean-Pierre Dalaise
