= Louise Labèque =

French actress

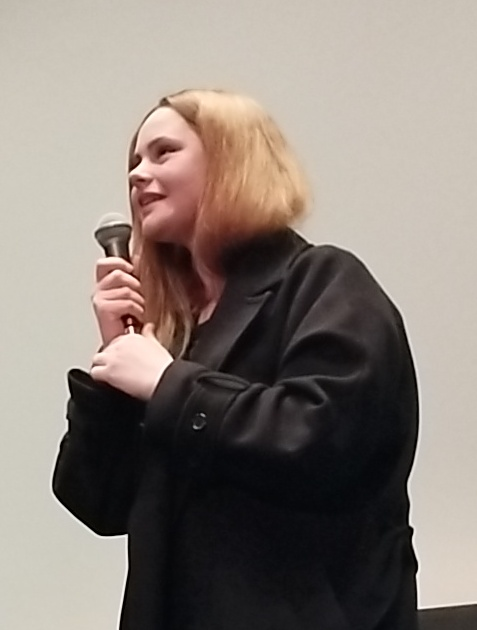
- Labèque in 2024
- Born: 13 April 2003 (age 23); France
- Occupation: Actress
- Years active: 2018–present
- Notable work: Zombi Child; Coma

Louise Labèque (born 13 April 2003) is a French actress. She made her breakthrough in Bertrand Bonello's fantasy film Zombi Child (2019). She has also starred in Coma (2022) and in Toni, en famille (2023).

== Early life and education ==
Labèque studied at the French drama school Cours Florent for three years. One day some agents came by during the class and one of them gave her a card to go through an audition for a film, which ended up being The Trouble-Shooter, her first film.

Labèque did an internship at the Lee Strasberg Theatre and Film Institute in New York in the summer of 2023.

== Career ==
In 2018, Labèque made her film debut in The Trouble-Shooter (Roulez jeunesse), the first feature film by director Julien Guetta. That same year, she appeared as Marion Malinski in the comedy drama film In Your Hands (Au bout des doigts), directed by Ludovic Bernard.

In 2019, she played Fanny, one of the main roles in Bertrand Bonello's fantasy film Zombi Child. Labèque said that working with Bonello confirmed her desire to make acting her profession. For her performance in the film, she was one of the young actresses shortlisted to compete for the César Award for Most Promising Actress, but did not get the nomination.

In 2021 and 2022, she played the role of Lisa Dayan in the television series In Therapy (En thérapie), created by Éric Toledano and Olivier Nakache.

For her performance in the 2021 short film The Toddler (Le Têtard) directed by Nathalie Lenoir, she was nominated for the Most Promising Actress award at the 2021 Festival Jean-Carmet in France, and won the award for Best Performance at the 2022 Vertigo Film Fest in Italy.

In 2022, she landed the lead role in the film Coma by Bertrand Bonello, a hybrid live-action and animated film in which she plays the role of a young girl who navigates between dreams and reality, until she begins to follow a disturbing and mysterious YouTuber named Patricia Coma.

In 2023, she starred in Annie Colère by Blandine Lenoir, and in Toni, en famille by Nathan Ambrosioni.

In 2024, she appeared as Sarah Dulac in the French miniseries Nudes, directed by Andréa Bescond.

== Filmography ==
=== Feature films ===
Year	Title	Role	Ref(s)
2018	The Trouble-Shooter (Roulez jeunesse)	Tina Dalmerac	
2018	In Your Hands (Au bout des doigts)	Marion Malinski	
2019	Zombi Child	Fanny	
2022	Coma	Young Girl	
2022	Annie Colère	Caroline	
2023	Toni, en famille	Camille	
2026	A Girl's Story	Jeannie	

=== Short films ===
Year	Title	Role	Ref(s)
2021	The Toddler (Le Têtard)	Jessie	
2024	Petite reine	Léna	

=== Television ===
Year	Title	Role	Notes
2021–2022	In Therapy	Lisa Dayan	4 episodes
2024	Nudes	Sarah Dulac	4 episodes

== Awards and nominations ==
Year	Award / Festival	Category	Work	Result	Ref(s)
2021	Festival Jean-Carmet	Most Promising Actress	The Toddler (Le Têtard)	Nominated	
2022	Vertigo Film Fest	Best Performance	The Toddler (Le Têtard)	Won	
2022	Festival Jean-Carmet	Best Supporting Actress	Annie Colère	Nominated	
2024	Festival Jean-Carmet	Most Promising Actress	Petite reine	Pending	
