= Aliocha =

French film director

- Born: Aliocha Allard; August 17, 1984 (age 40); Nuku Hiva, French Polynesia
- Occupation: Film director
- Years active: 2009–present

Aliocha (born Aliocha Allard; August 17, 1984) is a French film director.

== Biography ==
Aliocha was born in French Polynesia in 1984. Inspired by the film directors Robert Bresson, Luis Buñuel and Andrei Tarkovsky, he studied filmmaking in Paris and New York City before directing his first short film La conduite de la Raison (The guidance of Reason) which was presented at the Cannes Film Festival's Directors Fortnight 2011. Aliocha was selected to take part of the Toronto International Film Festival Talent Lab and the Berlinale Talent Campus. He then wrote and directed the short film Bake a Cake (winner of the “Aprile” Award at the Milano Film Festival 2012) which marked the first collaboration with the actor Jean-Louis Coulloc’h (Lady Chatterley) with whom he also shot his first feature film A villa in Los Angeles on the coast of Brittany, France.

== Filmography (Writer, Director) ==
- A villa in Los Angeles (2013)
- Bake a Cake (2012)
  - Aprile Award at the Milano Film Festival 2012
- La conduite de la Raison (2010) (English: The guidance of Reason)
  - Directors Fortnight 2011 Cannes Film Festival
- Catedral (2009)
  - Best Short Film at the London International Documentary Festival 2010
  - Best Documentary at Lo Sguardo Di Omero Festival 2010
  - Audience Award at the European Independent Film Festival 2010
