= Portrait of the Artist (film) =

- Film poster
- French: Le Dos rouge
- Directed by: Antoine Barraud
- Written by: Antoine Barraud
- Produced by: Antoine Barraud; Cédric Walter; Vincent Wang
- Starring: Bertrand Bonello
- Cinematography: Antoine Parouty
- Edited by: Catherine Libert; Frédéric Piet
- Music by: Bertrand Bonello
- Release date: 3 October 2014 (Centre Pompidou)
- Running time: 127 minutes
- Country: France
- Language: French

Portrait of the Artist (French: Le Dos rouge) is a 2014 French drama film directed by Antoine Barraud, and starring Bertrand Bonello.

== Cast ==
- Bertrand Bonello as Bertrand
- Jeanne Balibar as Célia Bhy
- Geraldine Pailhas as Célia Bhy
- Joana Preiss as Barbara, dite Barbe
- Pascal Greggory as Pascal
- Nicolas Maury as Le jeune journaliste
- Valerie Dreville as Alice
- Marta Hoskins as Edwarda Kane
- Barbet Schroeder as Le médecin
- Charlotte Rampling as La mère (voice)
- Isild Le Besco as Renée
- Alex Descas as Scottie
- Brady Corbet as Spectateur cinéma (uncredited)
