= Plastic key to paradise =

Reported tokens promising entry to heaven used in the Iran-Iraq War

During the Iran–Iraq War (1980–88), the Iranian leadership — in need of ways to breach the Iraqi minefields and use of poison gas by Saddam Hussein's regime — sought young volunteers willing to risk death. These volunteers were reportedly given imitation golden-colored, plastic keys (or brass keys in other reports) with the promise that the keys would unlock the gates of paradise (Jannah) for them if they were killed in the war. (Note: The high death rate for children is indicated by Brigadier General Mohammad-Saleh Jokar, the head the Students Basij, who stated that 36,000 schoolchildren were killed while only 2,853 were injured during the war. In a conventional war between professional armies, the number of wounded is higher not lower than the number of those killed. According to RFERL, this "exceptionally high ratio of dead to wounded reflects the children's lack of military training: they were used as cannon fodder in human-wave attacks launched by the Islamic Revolutionary Guard Corps against the Iraqi forces.")

Some western journalists and others report seeing soldiers wearing such keys and reports about the keys became widely referred to in literature about Islamism, Iran, or the war.

== Controversy ==
In 2000, New York Times journalist Elaine Sciolino wrote that, during the war, she had witnessed "Iranian soldiers ready for battle wearing small gold keys on their uniforms where other soldiers might wear medals. They were the keys that would immediately take their souls to heaven if they should die."

In her 2007 illustrated memoir Persepolis, Marjane Satrapi wrote that she heard of these keys while living in Iran during the war. She relates how she and her mother were shocked to learn from their maid in Tehran that gold painted plastic keys to paradise had been distributed to the boys in her son's school. The boys were reportedly told that the key would grant them admission to heaven if they died in battle, which caused the maid to tell Satrapi and her mother, "All my life, I've been faithful to this religion. If it's come to this... well I can't believe in anything anymore..." Other reports of the keys come from Ronen Bergman, Richard Landes Efraim Karsh, Hossein Aryan, etc.

However, according to Iranian journalist Baqer Moin, "keys to paradise" (Mafatih al-Jenan) refers not to imitation lock keys, but to a "book of common prayer" by Abbas Qomi (d. 1959), given to the Iranian volunteers. This practice was "misinterpreted by the opponents of Khomeini and fed to the gullible Western press." Another explanation is that the metallic identification tags, and/or colorful identification cards issued to soldiers were confused with plastic keys.

Iranian academic Mohammad Marandi, a veteran of the Iran-Iraq War, denies ever seeing any keys during the war and considers the "absurdity" of the plastic keys and similar allegations to be a feature of orientalist discourse which is not challenged by its Western audience, "as they reinforce the dominant representations of Iran in America by constructing an exotic Iran principally derived from US archives".

After questioning "several trusted Iran experts and analysts", Kevin F. Sullivan of Real Clear World, concluded that there is "virtually no photographic or video evidence" that these keys to paradise "ever existed". Something that could indicate (according to Sullivan) either that the story is untrue, or that being eager to die and proceed to paradise, very few of those who wore a key survived.

== Yemen ==
During the Yemeni Civil War, a Yemeni child who had been forcibly recruited by the Houthis and subsequently captured by the Yemeni army revealed that the Houthis had given him keys, claiming they would open the gates of Paradise for him.
