= The Hunter (2011 Russian film) =

2011 film

- Directed by: Bakur Bakuradze
- Written by: Bakur Bakuradze
- Release date: 21 May 2011 (Cannes)
- Running time: 110 minutes
- Country: Russia
- Language: Russian

The Hunter (Russian: Охотник) is a 2011 Russian drama film directed by Bakur Bakuradze. It premiered in the Un Certain Regard section at the 2011 Cannes Film Festival.

== Cast ==
- Gera Avdochenok as Kolya
- Mikhail Barskovich as Ivan Dunaev
- Vladimir Degilev as Viktor
- Oksana Semenova as Wife
- Tatyana Shapovalova as Lyuba
