= Sophie-Marie Larrouy =

French comedian, actress and podcaster

Sophie Marie Larrouy
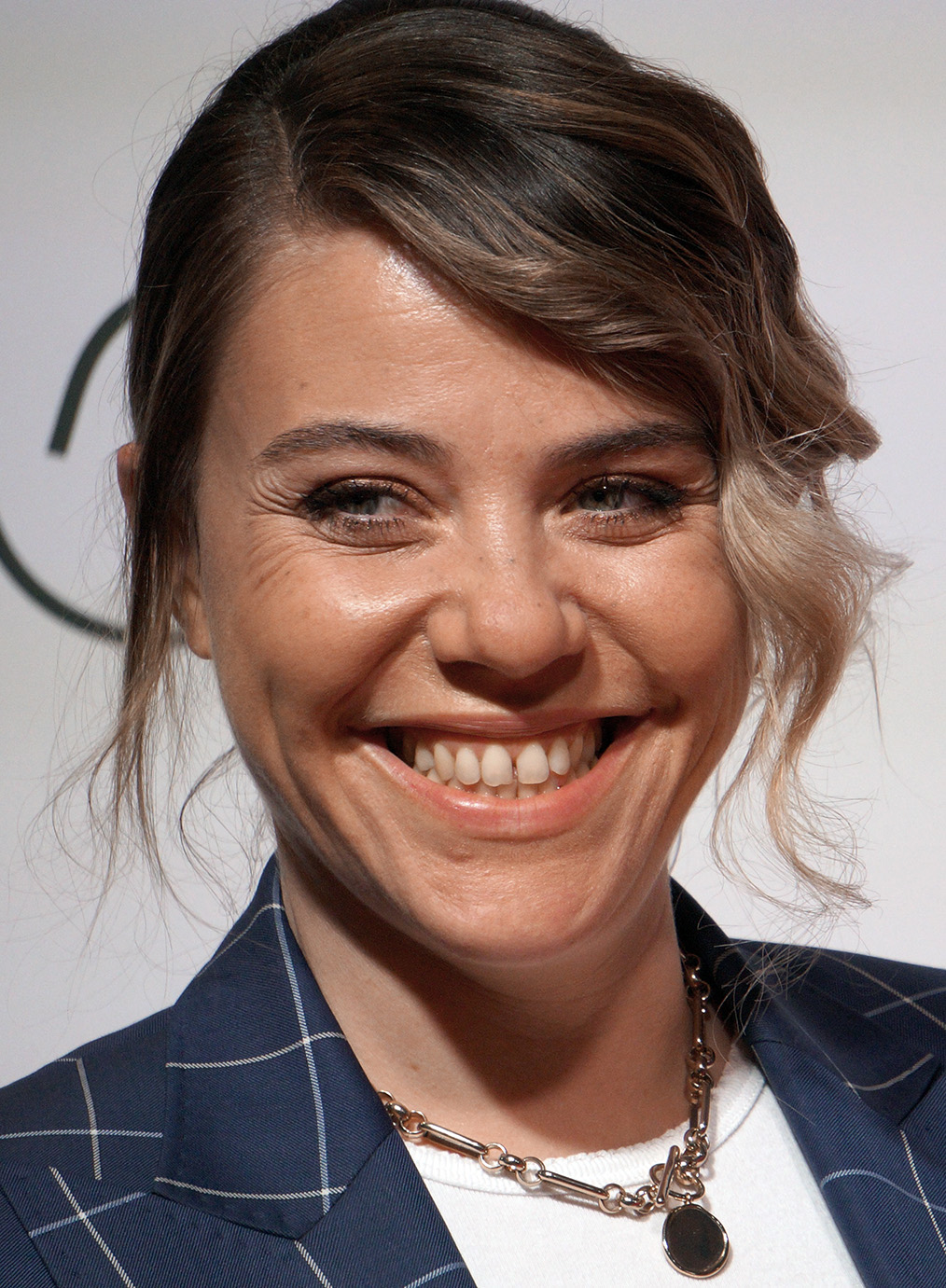
- Sophie-Marie Larrouy in 2020
- Born: February 22, 1984 (age 42); Remiremont, Vosges
- Occupations: Actress, YouTuber, writer, journalist, podcaster

Sophie-Marie Larrouy, also known as SML (born 22 February 1984 in Remiremont) is a French actress, comedian, journalist and writer.

== Career ==
Originally from Vosges, Larrouy graduated from the École supérieure de journalisme de Lille.

While working as a journalism intern, Larrouy began making YouTube videos as the character Vaness La Bomba. She continued while working for the online magazine Madmoizelle and Canal+'s breakfast television show, la Matinale. She has presented the podcasts L'Emifion, À bientôt de te revoir, On est chez nous and, from 2023, À la recherche du thon à la catalane.

In 2012 she appeared on stage in a one-woman show, Sapin le jour, ogre la nuit. She has also featured in films by David Moreau (It Boy, 2013), Philippe Le Guay (Floride, 2015) and L'Hermine (2015) by Christian Vincent where she appeared alongside Sidse Babett Knudsen and Fabrice Luchini.

In 2017, she played Sonia in the "first lesbian romantic comedy" Embrasse-moi! with Océan and Alice Pol.

In 2017 Larrouy released her first solo book L’art de la guerre 2 with the publisher Flammarion. The title refers to Sun Tzu's The Art of War.

== Works ==
=== Books ===
- Marc Hervez and Sophie-Marie Larrouy, Le Foot expliqué aux filles, à ma mère et à Didier Deschamps, Delcourt, 106 p., 2014 ISBN 2756055077
- Jeanne Gaullier and Sophie-Marie Larrouy, Devenir grands-parents pour les nuls (pour les nuls en bd), Delcourt, 98 p., 2016 ISBN 2412015996
- Sophie-Marie Larrouy and Navie Virgine Mosser, Comment ne pas devenir un vieux con, Marabout, 2016 ISBN 2501099559
- Sophie-Marie Larrouy and Navie Virginie Mosser, Comment garder sa BFF jusqu'à la mort ?, Marabout, 2017 ISBN 2501120930
- L'Art de la guerre 2, Flammarion, 221 p., 2017 ISBN 2081386313
- Logan De carvalho, Ma sœur est une gitane, preface by Sophie-Marie Larrouy, éditions Payot & Rivages, 150 p., 2018 ISBN 2228920711
- Cœurs à gratter, éditions Payot & Rivages, 150 p., 2018 ISBN 2228919950
