= The Pornographer (2001 film) =

2001 film by Bertrand Bonello

- Theatrical release poster
- French: Le Pornographe
- Directed by: Bertrand Bonello
- Written by: Bertrand Bonello
- Produced by: Carole Scotta
- Starring: Jean-Pierre Léaud; Jérémie Renier; Dominique Blanc; Thibault de Montalembert; André Marcon; Alice Houri; Ovidie; Catherine Mouchet; Laurent Lucas
- Cinematography: Josée Deshaies
- Edited by: Fabrice Rouaud
- Music by: Bertrand Bonello; Laurie Markovitch
- Production companies: Haut et Court; In Extremis Images
- Distributed by: Haut et Court
- Release dates: 8 September 2001 (TIFF); 3 October 2001 (France)
- Running time: 108 minutes
- Countries: France; Canada
- Language: French
- Budget: €1 million ($1.1 million)
- Box office: $126, 027

The Pornographer (French: Le Pornographe) is a 2001 erotic drama film written and directed by Bertrand Bonello, who co-wrote the music score with Laurie Markovitch. The film features an explicit sex scene with two pornographic actors, Ovidie and Titof. It won the FIPRESCI Prize (International Critics Week) at the 2001 Cannes Film Festival and was nominated for the Bronze Horse at the Stockholm Film Festival.

== Synopsis ==
Jacques Laurent is a former director of pornographic films, once active in the 1970s. Due to financial hardships, he comes out of retirement and resumes his career in porn, only to discover that the industry has changed.

== Cast ==
- Jean-Pierre Léaud as Jacques Laurent
- Jérémie Renier as Joseph
- Dominique Blanc as Jeanne
- Catherine Mouchet as Olivia Rochet
- Thibault de Montalembert as Richard
- André Marcon as Louis
- Alice Houri as Monika
- Ovidie as Jenny
- Titof as Franck
- Laurent Lucas as Carles

== Reception ==
On the review aggregator website Rotten Tomatoes, 36% of 14 critics' reviews are positive, with an average rating of 4.3/10.

== See also ==
- List of mainstream films with unsimulated sex
