= Scanorama (film festival) =

Film festival in Lithuania

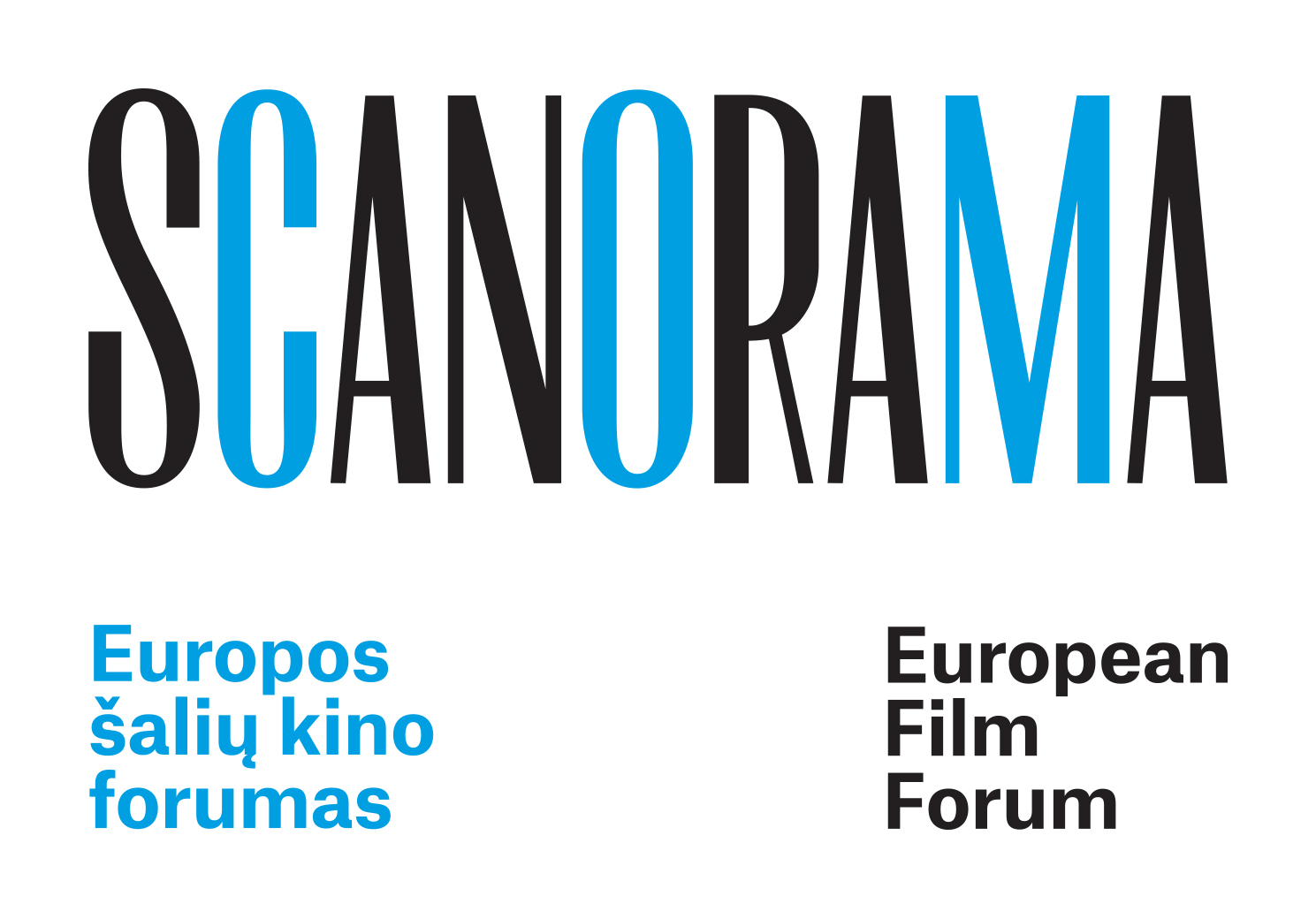
Scanorama logo

Scanorama, the European Film Festival, is held in Lithuania every year in November. It was established in 2003. The festival is usually held in three cities: Vilnius, Kaunas and Klaipėda, and recently Šiauliai was added to its locations. The artistic director is Gražina Arlickaitė, who is also the festival founder.

In recent years, Scanorama has launched the Scanorama Summer programme, a satellite event aimed at presenting European cinematic traditions and new releases in Lithuania's regions. The project focuses not on single film showings but on organising compact festivals in smaller towns.

== History ==
The festival is held annually in November. It was established by Gražina Arlickaitė in 2003. Since then Arlickaitė is the manager and artistic director of the festival. The festival was usually held in three cities: Vilnius, Kaunas and Klaipėda, and recently Šiauliai was added to its locations. Originally, the festival was established as a film forum of Nordic countries. Over time its scope grew and it had eventually become a forum for films from all European countries. It now shows around a hundred films, and attracts 30,000 submissions.

In 2008, Scanorama established the Baltic short film competition "New Baltic Cinema". In 2022 it was renamed to "Glimpses of Europe", to address the expanded scope of the festival.

In 2017 Scanorama, together with six other European film festivals established the film festival network "Moving Images – Open Borders" which aims to enhance the cooperation of European filmmakers.

In 2022, the 20th anniversary Scanorama was held in Vilnius, Kaunas, Klaipėda, Šiauliai, Panevėžys, and Alytus.

Notable winners of the competitions as Scanorama include Mark Gerstorfer for Best Short Film in 2022, and Saulius Baradinskas won the Best Lithuanian Short Film award, with 'Techno mama', which went on to receive 35 awards, and was nominated at the European Film Academy Awards for Best Short Film.

In 2025, Scanorama expanded to ten cities across Lithuania, where it screened 93 feature films, 35 short films, and hosted two workshops. The opening film of the festival was The Love That Remains, directed by Icelandic filmmaker Hlynur Pálmason.
