= Nocturama (film) =

- Directed by: Bertrand Bonello
- Written by: Bertrand Bonello
- Produced by: Edouard Weil; Alice Girard
- Starring: Finnegan Oldfield; Laure Valentinelli; Martin Petit-Guyot; Hamza Meziani; Manal Issa; Jamil McCraven; Ilias Le Doré; Rabah Nait Oufella; Robin Goldbronn; Vincent Rottiers
- Cinematography: Leo Hinstin
- Edited by: Fabrice Rouaud
- Music by: Bertrand Bonello
- Production companies: Wild Bunch; My New Picture; Arte; Pandora Film Produktion; Scope Pictures
- Distributed by: Wild Bunch; Grasshopper Film (US)
- Release dates: 8 July 2016 (Paris); 31 August 2016 (France); 11 August 2017 (United States)
- Running time: 130 minutes
- Countries: France; Belgium; Germany
- Language: French
- Budget: €5.6 million
- Box office: $321,768

Nocturama is a 2016 thriller film written and directed by Bertrand Bonello. It was released in France on 31 August 2016, and in the United States by Grasshopper Film on 11 August 2017. It tells the story of a group of young, multiethnic radicals committing a series of terrorist attacks in Paris.

== Plot ==
The first hour of the film follows a group of young revolutionaries as they orchestrate an elaborate plan that involves the planting of bombs across the city of Paris. It is revealed via flashback that the bombs are made of a substance called semtex, which has been provided to the young terrorists (all either teens or university students) by Greg, the only independent adult in the group. Their plan involves the planting of bombs in cars, high-rises, and government buildings, assassinating the head of HSBC France, and setting fire to the Jeanne d'Arc. Sarah, her boyfriend David, and Yacine each infiltrates the floor of a skyscraper to plant a bomb, aided by Fred, an accomplice who works as a security guard at the target buildings. Whilst searching David's floor, Fred finds and shoots to death an innocent office worker who was attending a call. This alerts another security guard, who kills Fred despite his appeals. David hears this from a neighboring hallway and runs, throwing away his bomb without having set it.

After detonating the bombs remotely, the young terrorists all convene to a department store situated in the heart of Paris, intending to stay there until evening of the next day so as to escape the attention of the authorities. The rest of the group consists of André, Samir, his sister Sabrina, and Mika, the youngest in the group. They hide while the security team searches through it looking for stragglers. One of their number, Omar, turns out to be another accomplice to the terrorists. He tells the group that he has bound and gagged the rest of the security team and shut down all the security cameras (it is revealed later that he shot and killed the guards). To their dismay, the group realizes that two of their number are missing: Fred and Greg. David informs them of Fred's death, but the fate of Greg, whose task was to assassinate the bank executive, remains a mystery. The group spends the night at the store, eating food from the grocery store and stealing clothes from boutiques. Omar turns some TVs on display on, allowing the group an insight into the state of the world outside. A panic has spread as the authorities search for the bombers, and this knowledge satisfies the group. They remain agitated, however, worrying about whether Greg has been captured and been coerced into revealing their whereabouts. David leaves the store to smoke. He encounters a homeless man whom he feels sorry for and invites into the mall for food, telling him his father owns the store and has allowed him and some friends run of the place. The man declines, saying he is waiting for his wife, but David insists upon leaving the door wedged open, in case the couple should want to enter. In another excursion outside, he meets a cyclist, who he asks for information about the state of affairs in the city. She informs him that the authorities are still searching for the perpetrators of the bombings, which she believes "were bound to happen," echoing the inevitability of something André said to Sarah earlier in the film: "Civilization is a condition for the downfall of civilization."

When David returns, he finds his fellow renegades even more on-edge, now partaking in impromptu performances and applying makeup onto each other and themselves. Mika has a dream of Greg walking up to him and telling him he forgot to hide his gun, which exposed him. Greg tells him he committed suicide on the streets and asks him if he would have done the same before disappearing, leaving a mannequin in his place, which severely unnerves Mika. Sarah screams when she sees the homeless man and his wife walking up the escalators, having taken David up on his offer. David consoles the group, telling them they have nothing to fear, and they begrudgingly concede to allowing the homeless couple access to the store. David and Sarah have sex, after which he turns a TV on to learn that the authorities are aware that the terrorists are holed up in the store, and are gearing up for action. He informs André of this development in a panic, and is told to hold-off from telling the others. He returns to Sarah, who is fast asleep. Yacine, lounging in a bathtub, tells Samir about the use of children as minefield testers during the Iran-Iraq War, specifically that the children were promised "heaven" after their death. André sets up the remainder of the semtex against some pillars, planning on using at as leverage when the authorities arrive. David eventually informs the rest of the group of the incoming forces and they all hide across the shop once again in anticipation, deathly afraid.

A squad of heavily armed police storms the store, and the youngsters attempt to surrender, holding up their arms and appearing passive. The police remorselessly shoot every single person regardless, including the homeless couple. In quick succession, all the young members of the team are gunned down, with their attempts to bargain or plea failing without exception, leaving a string of bodies embellishing the floors of the dark store. Samir, thinking of Yacine's story about the minefield testers, says the word "Heaven" to himself and trades gunfire with the police before they corner him behind a couch. He pleads for help, and the film ends with the sound of a gunshot, followed by an immediate cut to a screen-filling shot of raging flames.

== Cast ==
- Finnegan Oldfield as David
- Vincent Rottiers as Greg
- Hamza Meziani as Yacine
- Manal Issa as Sabrina
- Martin Petit-Guyot as André
- Jamil McCraven as Mika
- Rabah Nait Oufella as Omar
- Laure Valentinelli as Sarah
- Ilias le Dore as Samir
- Robin Goldbronn as Fred
- Luis Rego as Jean-Claude
- Hermine Karagheuz as Patricia
- Adèle Haenel as Cyclist

== Production ==
The film's working title was Paris est une fête (Paris is a Party). The film was shot in Paris in the summer of 2015. Part of the filming took place in La Samaritaine. It is Bertrand Bonello's first film that was shot digitally. Two days before shooting, Bonello rented a theater and showed Alan Clarke's Elephant to the cast and crew. Bonello stated that the influences on the film included George A. Romero's Dawn of the Dead, as well as John Carpenter's Assault on Precinct 13.

Bonello reworked the last minutes of the film as a letter to his daughter in a short film he did for Fondazione Prada during the COVID-19 lockdown in 2020, entitled Où en êtes-vous? (Numéro 2).

== Release ==
The film was released in France on 31 August 2016, and in the US by Grasshopper Film on 11 August 2017. It also screened in the Platform section at the 2016 Toronto International Film Festival.

== Reception ==
=== Critical reception ===
On review aggregator website Rotten Tomatoes, the film has an approval rating of 82% based on 49 reviews, and an average rating of 7.9/10. The website's critical consensus reads, "Nocturama uses an unorthodox perspective and repellent protagonists to offer sobering statements about modern society -- and deliver uniquely suspenseful entertainment." On Metacritic, which assigns a normalized rating, the film has a score 71 out of 100, based on 15 critics, indicating "generally favorable reviews".

Jordan Hoffman of The Guardian gave the film 3 stars out of 5, describing it as "[a] provocative French hipster-terrorism picture that is too crafty to ignore, but too obnoxious to embrace." Pamela Pianezza of Variety stated that "Bertrand Bonello's controversial portrait of Parisian radicals planning terror attacks around the city refuses to explain the unexplainable." David Ehrlich of IndieWire gave the film a grade of "B−", writing, "It's fine that Bonello would rather raise unsettling questions than provide unhelpful answers, but his inquiry often feels every bit as confused as his characters." Richard Brody of The New Yorker described the film as "an act of vanity" and Bonello's filmmaking skills as "banal" and "in no way revolutionary." Brody draws a sharp contrast between Nocturama and Jean-Luc Godard's La Chinoise, suggesting that Bonello's film suffers from the "emptiness of its aesthetic," whereas Godard's operates without "any sense of a system."

Ignatiy Vishnevetsky of The A.V. Club gave the film a grade of "A" and praised Bonello as a director who "has matured into a singular talent of modern film". He wrote, "Nocturama embraces abstractions and contradictions and locates meaning in them: the terrorists' need for attention and fear of being caught; the symbolism and meaninglessness of the plan; their status as sworn enemies of the status quo and creatures of the modern world; the contrast between the scale of the attack and the claustrophobia of the group's blinkered point-of-view." Jordan Mintzer of The Hollywood Reporter said, "if you put reality aside and try to judge the movie in a sort of vacuum, there are definitely things worth salvaging — such as Bonello's assured stylistic hand, which mixes fluid Steadicam shots with an array of tantalizing soundtrack choices, as well as an elliptical narrative that brings a handful of characters together in captivating ways, especially in the film's suspenseful first half."

The film was placed at number 13 on Sight & Sound's annual critics' poll. It was placed at number 3 on Slant Magazine's "Best Films of 2017" list as well as number 3 on Film Comment's "Best Undistributed Films of 2016" list, and number 5 on their "Best Films of 2017" list. It was also placed at number 71 on Consequence of Sound's "Top 100 Films of the 2010s" list and number 21 on The A.V. Club's "100 Best Movies of the 2010s" list.

=== Accolades ===
Award	Date of ceremony	Category	Recipient(s)	Result	Ref(s)
San Sebastian Film Festival	24 September 2016	SIGNIS Award	Nocturama	Won	
Mar del Plata Film Festival	26 November 2016	Special Mention for Best Cinematography	Leo Hinstin	Won	
Lumière Awards	30 January 2017	Best Film	Nocturama	Nominated	
Lumière Awards	30 January 2017	Best Director	Bertrand Bonello	Nominated	
Lumière Awards	30 January 2017	Best Cinematography	Leo Hinstin	Nominated	
