= Louise Courvoisier =

French filmmaker

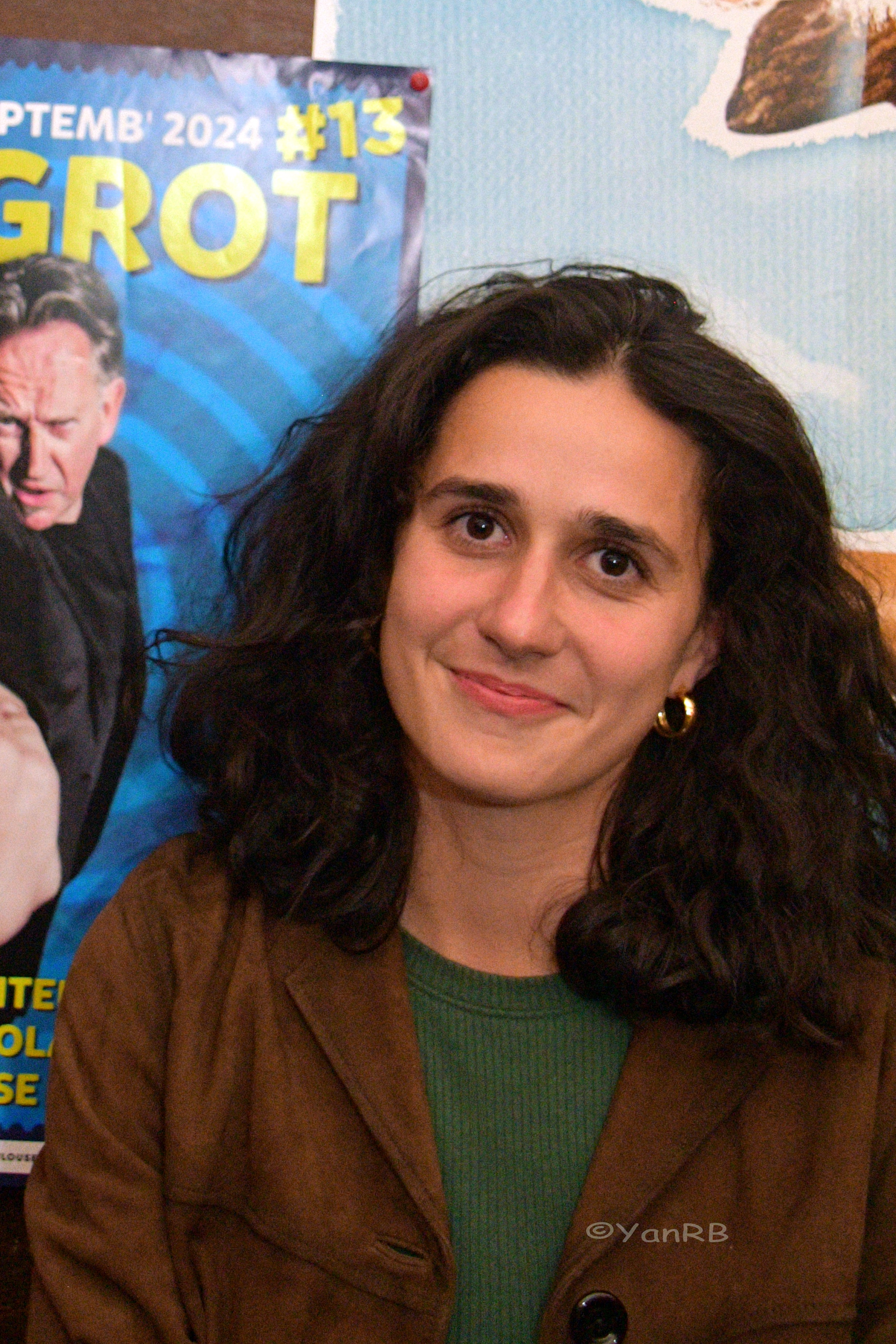
- Occupations: Film director, screenwriter

Louise Courvoisier is a French filmmaker.

== Early life and education ==
Louise Courvoisier was born in Geneva in 1994 and grew up in Cressia in the French Jura region. She completed her secondary education in Besançon. Subsequently, she studied film at Cinéfabrique (École Nationale Supérieure de Cinéma) in Lyon, one of France's most prestigious film schools.

== Artistic Work ==
Courvoisier's work is characterized by her bicultural background from the French-Swiss border region. Her short films often incorporate themes and motifs from her home region. A distinctive feature of her working method is the close collaboration with her artistically active family members, who take on various creative roles in her productions, including the composition of film music.

== Career ==
While a student, Courvoisier's 2018 film Mano a Mano was awarded the Cinéfondation prize at the 2019 Cannes Film Festival. Her debut feature film, Holy Cow, premiered in the Un Certain Regard portion of the festival in 2024, where it received the Youth Award. She also won the César Award for Best First Film for the film.

== Filmography ==
Year	Title	Notes	Ref.
2018	Mano a Mano	Short film	
2024	Holy Cow	—N/a	

== Awards and nominations ==
Year	Award	Category	Nominated work	Result	Ref.
2018	Cannes Film Festival	Cinéfondation Prize	Mano a Mano	Won	
2024	Cannes Film Festival	Un Certain Regard	Holy Cow	Nominated	
2024	Cannes Film Festival	Un Certain Regard - Youth Award	Holy Cow	Won	
2024	Cannes Film Festival	Camera d'Or	Holy Cow	Nominated	
