= Bertrand Bonello =

French filmmaker, composer, and actor (born 1968)

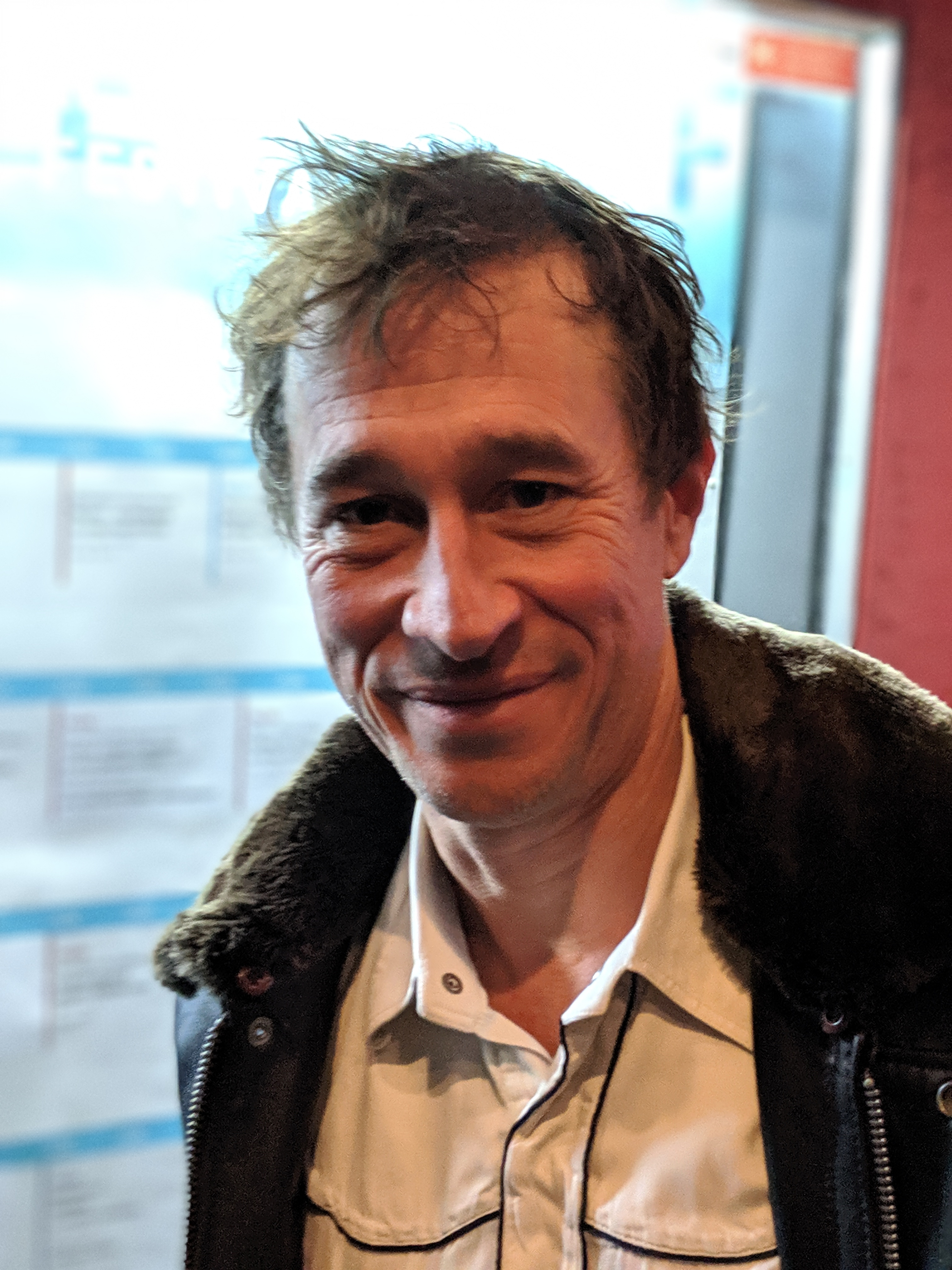
- Bonello in 2019
- Born: 11 September 1968 (age 58); Nice, France
- Occupations: Film director; screenwriter; producer; composer; actor
- Years active: 1996–present
- Children: 1
- Awards: Full list

Bertrand Bonello (French: [bɛʁtʁɑ̃ bɔnɛlo]; born 11 September 1968) is a French film director, screenwriter, producer, composer and actor. Most known for House of Tolerance (2011), Saint Laurent (2014), Nocturama (2016) and The Beast (2023).

His early work has been associated with the New French Extremity, Something Organic (1998), The Pornographer (2001). He also starred in Portrait of the Artist (2015) and Titane (2021). He was nominated for the César Award for Best Director for Saint Laurent, and was named a Knight of the Order of Arts and Letters in France in 2015.

== Early life ==
Bonello's background is in classical music, and he started playing the piano at the age of five. Later on he had a band, and then he discovered punk and rock music and switched from classical to pop music.

He became interested in films at the age of twelve by watching horror films from directors such as David Cronenberg, Dario Argento, George A. Romero, and Lucio Fulci. He decided to become a director after watching Stranger Than Paradise (1984) by Jim Jarmusch. Before working as a director, he worked as a session musician on tours and on records for other artists.

== Career ==
His feature directorial debut, Something Organic, was screened in the Panorama section of the 1998 Berlin Film Festival. His second feature film, The Pornographer, won the FIPRESCI prize at the 2001 Cannes Film Festival. His third feature film, Tiresia, was nominated for the Palme d'Or at the 2003 Cannes Film Festival.

Bonello owns the production company My New Picture, which has produced all his films since On War (2008). Bonello was a member of the jury of the Cinéfondation & Short Films section at the 2009 Cannes Film Festival.

His 2011 film House of Tolerance, a depiction of daily life in a fin-de-siècle Parisian bordello, premiered In Competition at the 2011 Cannes Film Festival. His 2014 film Saint Laurent, a biopic of fashion designer Yves Saint Laurent, competed for the Palme d'Or in the main competition section at the 2014 Cannes Film Festival. It received ten César Award nominations, including Best Film and Best Director. The film was selected as France's submission for the Academy Award for Best Foreign Language Film at the 87th Academy Awards.

In 2016, Bonello released the thriller Nocturama. In 2018 he was the president of the jury for the Cinéfondation & Short Films section at the 2018 Cannes Film Festival. His 2019 film, Zombi Child, was screened in the Directors' Fortnight section at the 2019 Cannes Film Festival. His 2022 film Coma competed for the Encounters Award at the 72nd Berlin International Film Festival and won the FIPRESCI Award at the festival.

Bonello's tenth feature film, The Beast (2023) a sci-fi romantic drama freely inspired by Henry James' 1903 novella The Beast in the Jungle, had its world premiere in the official competition of the 80th Venice International Film Festival.

In April 2023, Love Theme Music released a soundtrack album featuring original music by Bonello that he wrote for his films.

In 2026, Bonello started filming his delayed project about the canonization process of Pope John Paul II, co-written by Thomas Bidegain. Starring Mark Ruffalo an American-born priest summoned by the Vatican, Charlotte Rampling as Polish-born American philosopher Anna-Teresa Tymieniecka, Andrzej Chyra as Pope John Paul, Cezary Żak as Stanisław Dziwisz, Adam Bessa as Mehmet Ali Ağca, alongside Anton Lesser and Marisa Borini in supporting roles. Filming will take place in Rome, Matera, Warsaw and Szczawnica.

== Personal life ==
Bonello was in a relationship with his frequent collaborator, French-Canadian cinematographer Josée Deshaies, with whom he had a daughter, Anna, who was born in 2003, and who co-composed the score for his film The Beast. Bonello's 2022 film Coma was dedicated to and inspired by his daughter. He lives between Paris and Montreal.

== Filmography ==
=== Feature films ===
Year	English title	Original title	Notes
1998	Something Organic	Quelque chose d'organique	Also composer
2001	The Pornographer	Le Pornographe	Also composer
2003	Tiresia		
2008	On War	De la guerre	Also producer and composer
2011	House of Tolerance	L'Apollonide: Souvenirs de la maison close	Also producer and composer
2012	Ingrid Caven: Music and Voice	Ingrid Caven, musique et voix	Documentary
2014	Saint Laurent		Also actor and composer
2016	Nocturama		Also composer
2019	Zombi Child		Also composer
2022	Coma		Also producer and composer
2023	The Beast	La Bête	Also producer and composer
TBA	Santo Subito!		Post-production

=== Short films ===
Year	Title	Credited as						Notes
Year	Title	Director	Screenwriter	Composer	Producer	Actor	Role	Notes
1996	Who I Am (Qui je suis)	Yes	Yes	Yes	Yes	Yes	Pylade	Short film
2002	The Adventures of James and David	Yes	Yes	Yes				Short film
2005	Cindy: The Doll Is Mine	Yes	Yes					Short film
2006	My New Picture	Yes	Yes	Yes	Yes			Short film
2010	Where the Boys Are	Yes	Yes					Short film
2012	Die Frau			Yes				Short film
2012	Ingrid Caven: Music and Voice	Yes			Yes			
2014	Where Are You, Bertrand Bonello? (Où en êtes-vous, Bertrand Bonello?)	Yes	Yes	Yes				Short film
2016	Sarah Winchester: Ghost Opera	Yes	Yes					Short film
2020	Où en êtes-vous? (Numéro 2)	Yes	Yes	Yes				Short film
2022	The Dam		Yes					

=== Acting roles ===
Year	Title	Role	Director	Notes
1996	Who I Am (Qui je suis)	Pylade	Bertrand Bonello	
2003	Lapin intégral	Steve	Cécilia Rouaud	Short film
2004	Le pont des Arts	A spectator	Eugène Green	
2006	We Should Not Exist (On ne devrait pas exister)	Bertrand	Hervé P. Gustave	
2012	Hand in Hand	Prétendant Hélène Marchal	Valérie Donzelli	
2014	Saint Laurent	Libération journalist	Bertrand Bonello	
2015	Portrait of the Artist	Bertrand	Antoine Barraud	
2021	Titane	Alexia's father	Julia Ducournau	

== Decorations ==
- Knight of the Order of Arts and Letters (2015)
