= On War (film) =

- Theatrical release poster
- Directed by: Bertrand Bonello
- Written by: Bertrand Bonello
- Produced by: Bertrand Bonello; Kristina Larsen
- Starring: Mathieu Amalric; Asia Argento; Guillaume Depardieu; Clotilde Hesme
- Cinematography: Josée Deshaies
- Edited by: Fabrice Rouaud
- Music by: Bertrand Bonello
- Production company: My New Picture
- Distributed by: Ad Vitam Distribution
- Release dates: 17 May 2008 (Cannes); 1 October 2008 (France)
- Running time: 130 minutes
- Country: France
- Language: French
- Box office: $90.000

On War (French: De la guerre) is a 2008 French comedy-drama film directed by Bertrand Bonello and starring Mathieu Amalric, Laurent Lucas, Guillaume Depardieu, Asia Argento, Michel Piccoli and Léa Seydoux. It follows a man in the middle of an existential crisis as he gets drawn into a strange pleasure-obsessed cult. The film's title loosely refers to the treatise On War, by Carl von Clausewitz.

== Plot ==
Bertrand (Mathieu Amalric), a film director, is conducting research for his latest film, and asks a funeral director if he can stay back at his parlour after the close of business. Bertrand cannot resist getting into a coffin, and accidentally knocks the lid down, locking himself in. When he's released the following morning, it's clear he's been profoundly affected by the experience.

That night, he considers hiring his regular prostitute, but cancels after a film on TV—David Cronenberg's eXistenZ – grabs his attention. The next day—still ignoring his girlfriend, Louise—Bertrand encounters a group of policeman on the street and is momentarily confused when he's unable to find a specific reason why they're there.

In the evening, he returns to the funeral parlour, where a strange man, Charles (Guillaume Depardieu), breaks in with him. After asking Bertrand to describe his experience in the coffin, the man eventually takes him to a countryside mansion, the headquarters to a cult called The Kingdom.

Book I – The Nature of War

The cult's leader, Uma (Asia Argento), a young woman who tapes her breasts and wears conservative clothing, tells Bertrand that if he wants “pleasure”, he must join them in their “war”. Although initially uncomfortable about being denied access to a phone, and unsettled by the sexual advances of a younger member, Maria (Léa Seydoux), Bertrand soon befriends a fellow member called Rachel and finds himself taking part in activities designed to bring him closer to the “pure existence” experienced by people like the Native Americans (photos of whom line the walls of the mansion).

These activities include: trust exercises; crawling up and down a sand patch on all fours; touching, and being touched by, a partner; wandering the woods in animal masks; simulated sex; receiving a form of communion from Uma; and listening to Uma read pornography. After the group spend a long evening dancing in the woods, Bertrand watches a woman in a Venetian mask strip naked and drift into the river. Unable to swim, he sits on the bank and watches.

His two-week trial period with the cult complete, he returns to the city and attempts to explain what he's been through to his girlfriend, Louise, making mention of his transcendent moment with the woman in the river. Unable to re-adjust, however, (and visited by a violent dream in which a man has his eyes gouged out with scissors), he quickly decides to drop his film and return to the cult, now more committed to its cause than ever.

Book IV – Commitment

Things grow weirder as Uma introduces Bertrand to a room of sculptures resembling skinless bodies. Around this time, he also starts to move in and out of a dream-state, imagining that he's a soldier in a trench fighting against an unseen enemy. His "beautiful" performance in the trenches earns him Uma's praise.

Louise visits the mansion but, unable to understand the cult, simply ends up wandering its grounds. Shortly after, a concerned friend of Bertrand's visits but is promptly expelled by him for suggesting that he leave the cult.

Meanwhile, a young man, Pierre, who was being groomed by Charles to “carry the sword” as a lieutenant in the organisation, accidentally shoots himself in the head with a rifle. Uma, distraught, consults with an authoritative older man, Le Grand Hou, possibly a former leader of the group. After reminding her that she's a good "warrior", he enigmatically asks her if she'd ever hoped that the sky would rend before her eyes. Her answer is "Yes, often".

Book VII – Attack

In his dream-state, Bertrand is now a lieutenant and carries a sword. Hunting through the forest for animals (which we hear but don't see), he tells us in a voice-over that his task now is to kill Colonel Kurtz, which is the same task given to Martin Sheen's character in Apocalypse Now. He drifts down the river (apparently able to swim in the dream-state) but stops when he comes across Pierre's wrapped-up body. The meaning behind the presence of Pierre's body in Bertrand's dream is ambiguous.

Back in reality, Bertrand decides that it's time to say goodbye to Uma and leave the cult once more. She warns him one last time about the difficulties he will face on the outside. The film ends with Bertrand sat on a bench back in the city, smiling as he listens to Bob Dylan.

== Cast ==
- Mathieu Amalric as Bertrand
- Asia Argento as Uma
- Guillaume Depardieu as Charles
- Clotilde Hesme as Louise
- Laurent Delbecque as Pierre
- Léa Seydoux as Marie
- Michel Piccoli as Le grand Hou
- Aurore Clément as La mère de Bertrand
- Elina Löwensohn as Rachel
- Laurent Lucas as Christophe
- Marcelo Novais Teles as Frédéric
- Vincent Macaigne
