= Zombi Child =

2019 film by Bertrand Bonello

- Film poster
- Directed by: Bertrand Bonello
- Written by: Bertrand Bonello
- Starring: Louise Labèque; Wislanda Louimat; Adilé David
- Cinematography: Yves Cape
- Edited by: Anita Roth
- Music by: Bertrand Bonello
- Production companies: My New Pictures; Les Films du Bal
- Distributed by: Ad Vitam
- Release dates: 17 May 2019 (Cannes); 12 June 2019 (France)
- Running time: 103 minutes
- Country: France
- Language: French
- Box office: $200,599

Zombi Child is a 2019 French drama film directed by Bertrand Bonello. It is based on the account of the life of a supposed zombified man in Haiti, Clairvius Narcisse. It was screened in the Directors' Fortnight section at the 2019 Cannes Film Festival.

== Plot ==
In 1962, a Haitian man is buried by his family and his brother that caused his death by voodoo, only to be brought back as an undead zombi slave. Fifty-five years later, a teenage girl Fanny makes friends with Mélissa, who moved from Haiti to France after the 2010 Haiti earthquake. After it is revealed that Mélissa's family is associated with voodoo culture, Fanny convinces Mélissa's aunt Katy (a mambo) to perform a ritual in order to cure Fanny's heartbreak over a recent breakup. The ritual goes awry, however, leaving Fanny possessed by Baron Samedi himself.

== Cast ==
- Louise Labèque as Fanny
- Wislanda Louimat as Mélissa
- Mackenson Bijou as Clairvius
- Katiana Milfort as Mambo Katy
- Adilé David as Salomé
- Ninon François as Romy
- Mathilde Riu as Adèle
- Patrick Boucheron as History teacher
- Nehémy Pierre-Dahomey as Baron Samedi
- Ginite Popote as Francina
- Sayyid El Alami as Pablo
- Saadia Bentaieb as Superintendent

== Release ==
The film had its world premiere in the Directors' Fortnight section at the 2019 Cannes Film Festival on 17 May 2019. It was released in France on 12 June 2019.

== Reception ==
=== Critical response ===
On review aggregator website Rotten Tomatoes, the film has an approval rating of 86% based on 83 reviews, and an average rating of 7.1/10. The website's critical consensus reads, "If the strain of its ambitious juggling act sometimes shows, Zombi Child remains an entertainingly audacious experience, enlivened with thought-provoking themes." On Metacritic the film has a score 74 out of 100, based on 13 critics, indicating "generally favorable reviews".
