= 2011 Cannes Film Festival =

64th Cannes Film Festival
- Official poster of the 64th Cannes Film Festival featuring a 1967 photo by Palme d'Or-winning American director Jerry Schatzberg of American actress Faye Dunaway
- Opening film: Midnight in Paris
- Closing film: Beloved
- Location: Cannes, France
- Founded: 1946
- Awards: Palme d'Or: The Tree of Life
- Hosted by: Mélanie Laurent
- No. of films: 20 (In Competition)
- Festival date: 11 – 22 May 2011
- Website: Website

Cannes Film Festival
- 2012 2010

The 64th Cannes Film Festival took place from 11 to 22 May 2011. American actor Robert De Niro served as the president of the jury for the main competition. American filmmaker Terrence Malick won the Palme d'Or, the festival's top prize, for the drama film The Tree of Life.

Italian film director Bernardo Bertolucci was presented with the Honorary Palme d'Or during the opening ceremony of the festival. The official poster for the festival featured a 1967 photo of American actress Faye Dunaway by the American director and photographer Jerry Schatzberg, who won the Palme d'Or in 1973 (then known as the "Grand Prix du Festival International du Film") for his film Scarecrow. Mélanie Laurent hosted the opening and closing ceremonies.

Jailed Iranian filmmakers Jafar Panahi and Mohammad Rasoulof were honoured at the festival. Goodbye by Rasoulof and Panahi's This Is Not a Film were screened at the festival.

Danish filmmaker Lars von Trier caused controversy with comments made during Melancholia's press conference, when asked about the relation between the influences of German Romanticism in the film and his own German heritage, the director made jokes about Jews and Nazis. Stating that he "understood" Adolf Hitler and admired the work of architect Albert Speer, and jokingly announced that he was a Nazi. The Cannes Film Festival organization first issued an official apology for the remarks the same day and clarified that Trier was not a Nazi or an antisemite, the following day the filmmaker was declared "persona non grata", though the film remained in competition, winning Best Actress for Kirsten Dunst.

The festival opened with Midnight in Paris by Woody Allen, and closed with Beloved by Christophe Honoré.

== Juries ==
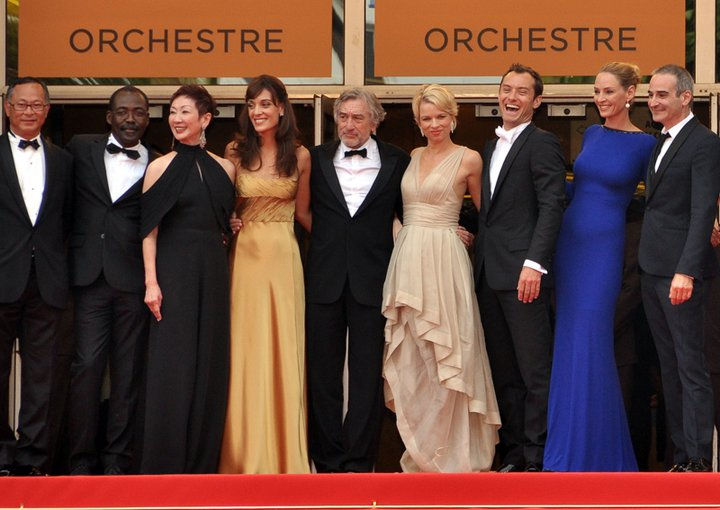
The jury for the main competition. From left to right: Johnnie To, Mahamat-Saleh Haroun, Nansun Shi, Martina Gusman, Robert De Niro, Linn Ullmann, Jude Law, Uma Thurman and Olivier Assayas

=== Main competition ===
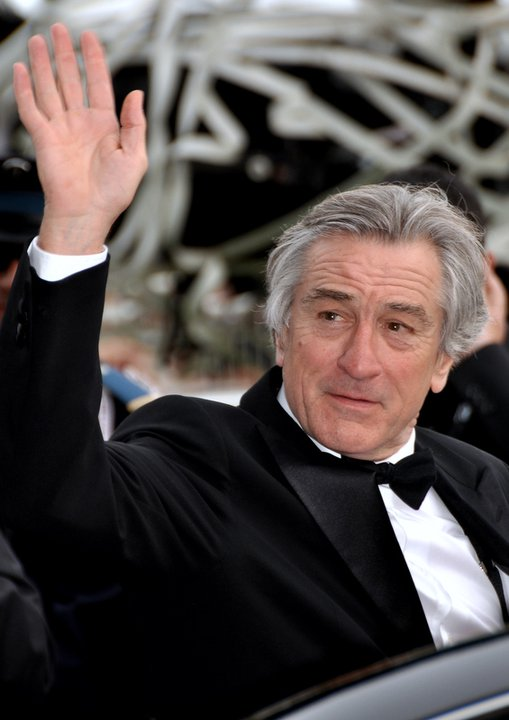
Robert De Niro, 2011 Jury President

The following people were appointed as the Jury for the feature films of the 2011 Official Selection:

- Robert De Niro, American actor and producer - Jury President
- Olivier Assayas, French filmmaker
- Martina Gusmán, Argentine actress and producer
- Mahamat-Saleh Haroun, Chadian filmmaker
- Jude Law, English actor
- Nansun Shi, Hong Kong producer
- Uma Thurman, American actress
- Johnnie To, Hong Kong director and producer
- Linn Ullmann, Norwegian critic and writer

=== Un Certain Regard ===
- Emir Kusturica, Serbian filmmaker – Jury President
- Élodie Bouchez, French actress
- Peter Bradshaw, British critic
- Geoffrey Gilmore, American Creative Director of Tribeca Enterprises
- Daniela Michel, Mexican director of the Morelia Festival

=== Cinéfondation and Short Films Competition ===
- Michel Gondry, French director – Jury President
- Julie Gayet (French actress and producer
- Jessica Hausner, Austrian filmmaker and producer
- Corneliu Porumboiu, Romanian filmmaker
- João Pedro Rodrigues, Portuguese filmmaker

=== Camera d'Or ===
- Bong Joon-ho, South Korean filmmaker – Jury President
- Robert Alazraki, French cinematographer
- Daniel Colland, French manager of Cinedia laboratory
- Danièle Heymann, French critic
- Jacques Maillot, French director
- Alex Masson, French critic
- Eva Vezer, Hungarian Head of Magyar Filmunio

=== Critics' Week ===
Nespresso Grand Prize

- Lee Chang-dong, South Korean filmmaker – Jury President
- Scott Foundas, American film critic
- Nick James, English film critic
- Cristina Piccino, Italian film critic
- Sergio Wolf, Argentinian film critic and curator

== Official Selection ==
=== In Competition ===
For the first time ever, four female directors were featured in the main competition: Australian filmmaker Julia Leigh, Japanese filmmaker Naomi Kawase, Scottish filmmaker Lynne Ramsay and French filmmaker Maïwenn. The following feature films competed for the Palme d'Or:

English Title	Original Title	Director(s)	Production Country
The Artist		Michel Hazanavicius	France
Drive		Nicolas Winding Refn	United States
Footnote	הערת שוליים	Joseph Cedar	Israel
Hanezu	朱花の月	Naomi Kawase	Japan
Hara-Kiri: Death of a Samurai	一命	Takashi Miike	Japan, United Kingdom
Le Havre		Aki Kaurismäki	Finland, France, Germany
House of Tolerance	L'apollonide (Souvenirs de la maison close)	Bertrand Bonello	France
The Kid with a Bike	Le Gamin au vélo	Jean-Pierre and Luc Dardenne	Belgium, France
Melancholia		Lars von Trier	Denmark, Sweden, France, Germany
Michael (CdO)		Markus Schleinzer	Austria
Once Upon a Time in Anatolia	Bir Zamanlar Anadolu'da	Nuri Bilge Ceylan	Turkey, Bosnia and Herzegovina
Pater		Alain Cavalier	France
Polisse		Maïwenn	France
The Skin I Live In	La piel que habito	Pedro Almodóvar	Spain
Sleeping Beauty (CdO)		Julia Leigh	Australia
The Source	La source des femmes	Radu Mihăileanu	France, Belgium, Italy
This Must Be the Place		Paolo Sorrentino	Italy, France, Ireland
The Tree of Life		Terrence Malick	United States
We Have a Pope	Habemus Papam	Nanni Moretti	Italy, France
We Need to Talk About Kevin		Lynne Ramsay	United Kingdom, United States

(CdO) indicates film eligible for the Caméra d'Or as directorial debut feature.

=== Un Certain Regard ===
The following films were selected for the competition of Un Certain Regard:

English Title	Original Title	Director(s)	Production Country
Arirang	아리랑	Kim Ki-duk	South Korea
Beauty	Skoonheid	Oliver Hermanus	South Africa
Bonsai		Cristián Jiménez	Chile
The Day He Arrives	북촌방향	Hong Sang-soo	South Korea
Elena	Елена	Andrey Zvyagintsev	Russia
Goodbye	به امید دیدار	Mohammad Rasoulof	Iran
Hard Labor (CdO)	Trabalhar Cansa	Juliana Rojas and Marco Dutra	Brazil
The Hunter	Охотник	Bakur Bakuradze	Russia
Loverboy		Cătălin Mitulescu	Romania
Martha Marcy May Marlene (CdO)		Sean Durkin	United States
The Minister	L'Exercice de l'État	Pierre Schöller	France, Belgium
Miss Bala		Gerardo Naranjo	Mexico
Oslo, August 31st	Oslo, 31. august	Joachim Trier	Norway
Hors Satan		Bruno Dumont	France
Restless		Gus Van Sant	United States
The Snows of Kilimanjaro	Les Neiges du Kilimandjaro	Robert Guédiguian	France
Stopped on Track	Halt auf freier Strecke	Andreas Dresen	Germany
Tatsumi		Eric Khoo	Singapore
Toomelah		Ivan Sen	Australia
Where Do We Go Now?	هلق لوين؟	Nadine Labaki	Lebanon, France, Egypt, Italy
The Yellow Sea	황해	Na Hong-jin	South Korea

(CdO) indicates film eligible for the Caméra d'Or as directorial debut feature.

=== Out of Competition ===
The following films were selected to be screened out of competition:

English Title	Original Title	Director(s)	Production Country
The Beaver		Jodie Foster	United States, United Arab Emirates
Beloved (closing film)	Les Bien-aimés	Christophe Honoré	France
The Conquest	La Conquête	Xavier Durringer	France
Midnight in Paris (opening film)		Woody Allen	United States, Spain
Pirates of the Caribbean: On Stranger Tides		Rob Marshall	United States
Midnight Screenings
Bollywood: The Greatest Love Story Ever Told		Rakeysh Omprakash Mehra and Jeff Zimbalist	India
Days of Grace (CdO)	Dias de gracia	Everardo Gout	Mexico
Dragon	武俠	Peter Chan	Hong Kong, China

(CdO) indicates film eligible for the Caméra d'Or as directorial debut feature.

=== Special Screenings ===
The following films were shown as special screenings.

English Title	Original Title	Director(s)	Production Country
18 Days	18 يوم	Ahmad Abdallah, Mariam Abou Ouf, Kamla Abu Zikri, Ahmed Alaa, Mohamed Ali, Sherif Arafa, Sherif El Bendary, Marwan Hamed, Khaled Marei and Yousry Nasralla	Egypt
The Big Fix		Rebecca Tickell and Josh Tickell	United States
Duch, Master of the Forges of Hell	Le Maître des forges de l'Enfer	Rithy Panh	France
Leader-Sheep	Tous au Larzac	Christian Rouaud	France
Michel Petrucciani		Michael Radford	France
No More Fear (CdO)	La khaoufa baada al'yaoum	Mourad Ben Cheikh	Tunisia
Out of Bounds (CdO)	Labrador	Frederikke Aspöck	Denmark
The Postman	Al-Bostagui	Hussein Kamal	Egypt
This Is Not a Film	این فیلم نیست	Jafar Panahi and Mojtaba Mirtahmasb	Iran

(CdO) indicates film eligible for the Caméra d'Or as directorial debut feature.

=== Cinéfondation ===
The following films were selected to be screened in the Cinéfondation section, which focuses on short films made by students at film schools.

English Title	Original Title	Director(s)	School
The Agony and Sweat of the Human Spirit		D. Jesse Damazo and Joe Bookman	University of Iowa, United States
Bento Monogatari		Pieter Dirkx	Hogeschool Sint-Lukas, Belgium
Big Muddy		Jefferson Moneo	Columbia University, United States
Cagey Tigers	Tigre z klietky	Aramisova	FAMU, Czech Republic
Changeling	Der Wechselbalg	Maria Steinmetz	HFF Konrad Wolf, Germany
Drari		Kamal Nazraq	La Fémis, France
Duel Before Nightfall	Duelo Antes da Noite	Alice Furtado	Universidade Federal Fluminense, Brazil
Fly by Night	야간비행	Son Tae-gyum	Chung-Ang University, South Korea
The Letter	Der Brief	Doroteya Droumeva	DFFB, Germany
Martha Must Fly	Al Martha lauf	Ma'ayan Rypp	Tel Aviv University, Israel
On My Doorstep	Befetach beity	Anat Costi	Bezalel Academy, Israel
Salsipuedes		Mariano Luque	National University of Córdoba, Argentina
Suu and Uchikawa	Suu et Uchikawa	Nathanael Carton	NYU Asia, Singapore
Till Summer Comes	L'estate che non viene	Pasquale Marino	Centro Sperimentale di Cinematografia, Italy
The Trip	A Viagem	Simão Cayatte	Columbia University, United States
The Wedding Party	La fiesta de casamiento	Gastón Margolin and Martín Morgenfeld	Universidad del Cine, Argentina

=== Short films ===
The following short films competed for the Short Film Palme d'Or:

English Title	Original Title	Director(s)	Production Country
Bear		Nash Edgerton	Australia
Cold	Kjøttsår	Lisa Marie Gamlem	Norway
Cross-Country	Крос	Maryna Vroda	France, Ukraine
Ghost		Dahci Ma	South Korea
It Is Nothing	Ce n'est rien	Nicolas Roy	Canada
Meathead		Sam Holst	New Zealand
Paternal Womb		Megumi Tazaki	Japan
Soy tan feliz		Vladimir Durán	Argentina
Swimsuit 46	Badpakje 46	Wannes Destoop	Belgium

=== Cannes Classics ===
The following films were selected to be screened:

English Title	Original Title	Director(s)	Production Country
Tributes
A Bronx Tale (1993)		Robert De Niro	United States
A Clockwork Orange (1971)		Stanley Kubrick	United Kingdom, United States
The Conformist (1970)	Il Conformista	Bernardo Bertolucci	Italy
Molly		Moly Kane	Senegal
Puzzle of a Downfall Child (1970)		Jerry Schatzberg	United States
Sugar Cane Alley (1983)	Rue Cases-Négres	Euzhan Palcy	France
A Trip to the Moon (1902)	Le Voyage dans la lune	Georges Méliès	France
Documentaries about Cinema
Belmondo, itinéraire...		Vincent Perrot	France
Corman's World: Exploits Of A Hollywood Rebel (CdO)		Alex Stapleton	United States
Kurosawa's Way	Kurosawa, la Voie	Catherine Cadou	France
The Look		Angelina Maccarone	Germany, France
Once Upon a Time... A Clockwork Orange	Il était une fois... Orange mécanique	Antoine de Gaudemar	France
Restored Prints
The Assassin (1961)	L’assassino	Elio Petri	Italy
Children of Paradise (1945)	Les Enfants du paradis	Marcel Carné	France
Chronicle of a Summer (1960)	Chronique d'un été	Jean Rouch and Edgar Morin	France
Despair (1978)	Despair – Eine Reise ins Licht	Rainer Werner Fassbinder	West Germany
No Man's Land (1931)	Niemandsland	Victor Trivas	Germany
Le Sauvage (1975)		Jean-Paul Rappeneau	France
The Machine to Kill Bad People (1952)	La macchina ammazzacattivi	Roberto Rossellini	Italy
World Cinema Foundation
The Law of the Border (1966)	Hudutların Kanunu	Ömer Lütfi Akad	Turkey

=== Cinéma de la Plage ===
The Cinéma de la Plage is a part of the Official Selection of the festival:

English Title	Original Title	Director(s)	Production Country
And the Ship Sails On (1984)	E la nave va	Federico Fellini	Italy, France
Ant Scream (2011)		Sameh Abdel Aziz	Egypt
Das Boot: Directors Cut (1981)		Wolfgang Petersen	West Germany
The Caine Mutiny (1954)		Edward Dmytryk	United States
Greed in the Sun (1965)	100.000 dollars au soleil	Henri Verneuil	France, Italy
The Man from Acapulco (1973)	Le Magnifique	Philippe de Broca	France, Italy
A Night To Remember (1958)		Roy Ward Baker	United Kingdom
Reflets sur la Croisette (2011, a series of shorts)		Isabelle Putod	France
Winter Frog (2011)	Grenouille d'hiver	Slony Sow	France

== Parallel Sections ==
=== Critics' Week ===
The line-up for the Critics' Week section was announced on 18 April at the section's website. Declaration of War, directed by Valérie Donzelli, and Bachelor Days Are Over, directed by Katia Lewkowicz, were selected as the opening and closing films of the Semaine de la Critique section.

English Title	Original Title	Director(s)	Production Country
In Competition
17 Girls (CdO)	17 filles	Delphine and Muriel Coulin	France
Las Acacias (CdO)		Pablo Giorgelli	Argentina
Avé (CdO)		Konstantin Bojanov	Bulgaria
Sauna on the Moon	嫦娥	Zou Peng	China
The Slut (CdO)	הנותנת	Hagar Ben-Asher	Israel
Snowtown (CdO)		Justin Kurzel	Australia
Take Shelter		Jeff Nichols	United States
Short Films Competition
Alexis Ivanovitch, You're My Hero	Alexis Ivanovitch vous êtes mon héros	Guillaume Gouix	France
Black Moon		Amy Siegel	United States
Blue		Stephen Kang	New Zealand
Boy		Topaz Adizes	United States
Finis Operis	불멸의 사나이	Moon Byoung-gon	South Korea
In Front of the House	집 앞에서	Lee Tae-ho	South Korea
The Inviolability of the Domicile Is Based On the Man Who Appears Wielding an Axe at the Door of His House	La inviolabilidad del domicilio se basa en el hombre que aparece empuñando un hacha	Alex Piperno	Uruguay, Argentina
Junior		Julia Ducournau	France
Permanencias	Permanências	Ricardo Alves Júnior	Brazil
Sundays	Dimanches	Valéry Rosier	Belgium
Special Screenings
Bachelor Days Are Over (CdO) (closing film)	Pourquoi tu pleures?	Katia Lewkowicz	France
Declaration of War (opening film)	La Guerre est déclarée	Valérie Donzelli	France
My Little Princess (CdO)		Eva Ionesco	France
To Die By Your Side	Mourir auprès de toi	Spike Jonze and Simon Cahn	France
Walk Away Renee		Jonathan Caouette	United States, France

(CdO) indicates film eligible for the Caméra d'Or as directorial debut feature.

=== Directors' Fortnight ===
The following films were selected to be screened in the independent Directors' Fortnight section:

English Title	Original Title	Director(s)	Production Country
Blue Bird		Gust Van Den Berghe	Belgium
Breathing (CdO)	Atmen	Karl Markovics	Austria
Code Blue		Urszula Antoniak	Netherlands
Chatrak		Vimukthi Jayasundara	India
End of Silence (CdO)	La Fin du silence	Roland Edzard	France
The Fairy	La Fée	Bruno Romy, Dominique Abel and Fiona Gordon	Belgium, France
The Giants	Les Géants	Bouli Lanners	Belgium
Heat Wave (CdO)	Après le sud	Jean-Jacques Jauffret	France
Heavenly Body (CdO)	Corpo Celeste	Alice Rohrwacher	Italy
Iris in Bloom (CdO)	En ville	Valérie Mrejen and Bertrand Schefer	France
The Island	Островът	Kamen Kalev	Bulgaria, Sweden
The Other Side of Sleep (CdO)		Rebecca Daly	Ireland
On the Edge	Sur la planche	Leïla Kilani	Morocco
Palawan Fate	Busong	Auraeus Solito	Philippines
Play		Ruben Östlund	Sweden
Porfirio		Alejandro Landes	Colombia
Return (CdO)		Liza Johnson	United States
The Silence of Joan	Jeanne captive	Philippe Ramos	France
The Silver Cliff	O Abismo Prateado	Karim Aïnouz	Brazil
Unforgivable	Impardonnables	André Téchiné	France
Volcano (CdO)		Rúnar Rúnarsson	Iceland
Short Films
Armand 15 ans l’été dernier		Blaise Harrison	France
Boro in the Box		Bernard Mandico	France
Cigarette at Night		Duane Hopkins	United Kingdom
Csicska		Attila Till	Hungary
Dans le jardin du temps, portrait d’Ely et Nina Bielutin		Clément Cogitore	France
Demain, ça sera bien		Pauline Gay	France
Fourplay: Tampa		Henry Kyle	United States
The Guidance of Reason	La conduite de la Raison	Aliocha	France
Killing the chickens to Scare the Monkeys		Jens Assur	Sweden
Mila Caos		Simon Paetau	Germany
Nuven		Basil Da Cuncha	Chile
Las Palmas		Johannes Nyholm	Sweden
Le songe de Poliphile		Camille Henrot	France
Vice versa one		Sadat Shahrbanoo	Afghanistan
Special Screenings
Back Door Channels: The Price of Peace		Harry Hunkele	United States
Guilty of Romance	恋の罪	Sion Sono	Japan
Les jeunes gens modernes		Jérôme de Missolz & Jean-François Sanz	France
La nuit elles dansent		Isabelle Lavigne & Stéphane Thibault	Canada
El velador		Natalia Almada	United States

(CdO) indicates film eligible for the Caméra d'Or as directorial debut feature.

== Official Awards ==
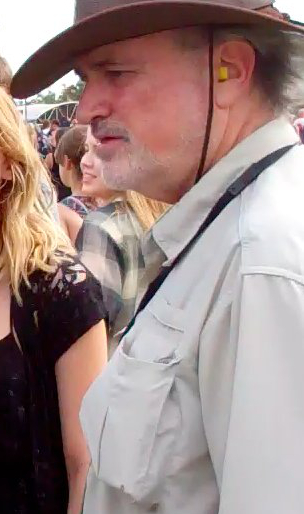
Terrence Malick, winner of the 2011 Palme d'Or

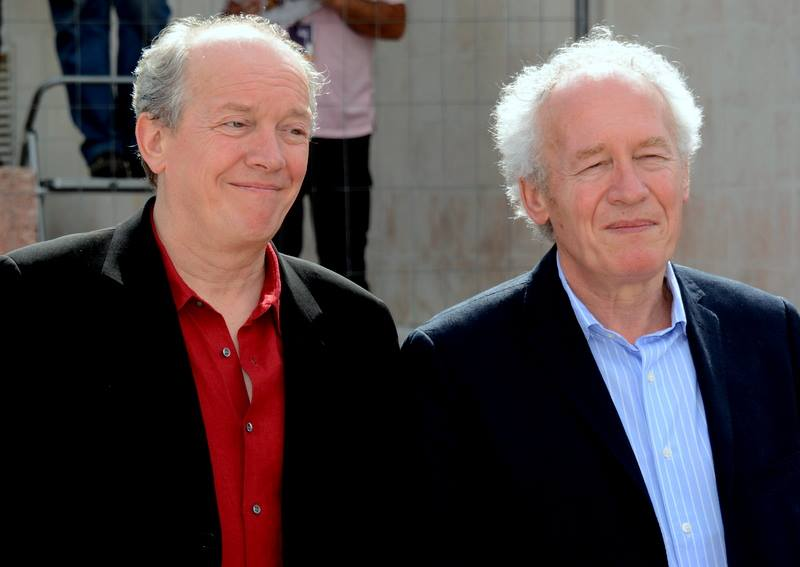
Jean-Pierre and Luc Dardenne, winners of the Grand Prix

The Palme d'Or was won by the American film The Tree of Life directed by Terrence Malick. Two of the film's producers, Bill Pohlad and Sarah Green, accepted the prize on behalf of the reclusive Malick. The Tree of Life is the first American film to win the Palme d'Or since Fahrenheit 9/11 in 2004. Head of the jury, Robert De Niro, said it was difficult to choose a winner, but The Tree of Life "ultimately fit the bill". De Niro explained, "It had the size, the importance, the intention, whatever you want to call it, that seemed to fit the prize."

The following films and people received the 2011 Official selection awards:

=== In Competition ===
- Palme d'Or: The Tree of Life by Terrence Malick
- Grand Prix:
  - Once Upon a Time in Anatolia by Nuri Bilge Ceylan
  - The Kid with a Bike by Jean-Pierre and Luc Dardenne
- Best Director: Nicolas Winding Refn for Drive
- Best Screenplay: Footnote by Joseph Cedar
- Best Actress: Kirsten Dunst for Melancholia
- Best Actor: Jean Dujardin for The Artist
- Jury Prize: Polisse by Maïwenn

=== Un Certain Regard ===
- Prix Un Certain Regard:
  - Arirang by Kim Ki-duk
  - Stopped on Track by Andreas Dresen
- Un Certain Regard Jury Prize: Elena by Andrey Zvyagintsev
- Un Certain Regard Best Director Award: Mohammad Rasoulof for Goodbye

=== Cinéfondation ===
- 1st Prize: The Letter by Doroteya Droumeva
- 2nd Prize: Drari by Kamal Nazraq
- 3rd Prize: Fly by Night by Son Tae-gyum

=== Caméra d'Or ===
- Las Acacias by Pablo Giorgelli

=== Short Films Competition ===
- Short Film Palme d'Or: Cross-Country (Крос) by Maryna Vroda
  - Special Mention: Swimsuit 46 by Wannes Destoop

== Independent Awards ==
=== FIPRESCI Prizes ===
- Le Havre by Aki Kaurismäki (In Competition)
- The Minister by Pierre Schöller (Un Certain Regard)
- Take Shelter by Jeff Nichols (Critics' Week)

=== Vulcan Award of the Technical Artist ===
- Vulcan Award: José Luis Alcaine (cinematography) for The Skin I Live In

=== Prize of the Ecumenical Jury ===
- This Must Be the Place by Paolo Sorrentino
  - Special Mention:
  - Le Havre by Aki Kaurismäki
  - Where Do We Go Now? by Nadine Labaki

=== Critics' Week ===
- Critics Week Nespresso Grand Prize: Take Shelter by Jeff Nichols
- Special Mention from the Jury President: Snowtown by Justin Kurzel
- Prix SACD: Take Shelter by Jeff Nichols
- ACID/CCAS Prize: Las Acacias by Pablo Giorgelli
- Very Young Critics Prize: Las Acacias by Pablo Giorgelli

=== Directors' Fortnight ===
- International Confederation of Art Cinemas: The Giants by Bouli Lanners
- Prix SACD: The Giants by Bouli Lanners

=== Prix François Chalais ===
- Where Do We Go Now? by Nadine Labaki

=== Queer Palm ===
- Beauty by Oliver Hermanus

=== Palm Dog ===
- Palm Dog Award: Uggy for The Artist
- Special Jury Prize: Laika for Le Havre
