= Tiresia =

- Theatrical release poster
- Directed by: Bertrand Bonello
- Written by: Bertrand Bonello; Luca Fazzi
- Starring: Laurent Lucas; Clara Choveaux; Thiago Telès; Célia Catalifo; Alex Descas
- Cinematography: Josée Deshaies
- Edited by: Fabrice Rouaud
- Music by: Albin De La Simone; Laurie Markovitch
- Release date: 20 May 2003 (Cannes)
- Running time: 115 minutes
- Country: France
- Language: French

Tiresia is a 2003 French film directed by Bertrand Bonello and written by Bonello and Luca Fazzi. Based on the legend of Tiresias, it tells of a transgender woman who is kidnapped by a man and left to die in the woods. She is then saved by a family and receives the gift of telling the future. The film stars Laurent Lucas, Clara Choveaux, Thiago Telès, and Célia Catalifo.

Tiresia was nominated for the Palme d'Or at the 2003 Cannes Film Festival.

== Cast ==
- Laurent Lucas as Terranova / Père François
- Clara Choveaux as Tiresia I
- Thiago Telès as Tiresia II
- Célia Catalifo as Anna
- Lou Castel as Charles
- Alex Descas as Marignac
- Fred Ulysse as Roberto
- Stella as Kim
- Marcelo Novais Teles as Eduardo
- Olivier Torres as Mathieu
- Isabelle Ungaro as Louise
- Abel Nataf as Le fils d'Anna
- Pascal Tréguy as Head Animal Trainer

== Bibliography ==
- Bernard Stiegler, "Tirésias et la guerre du temps: Autour d'un film de Bertrand Bonello," De la misère symbolique: Tome 1. L'époque hyperindustrielle (Paris: Galilée, 2004): 163–85.
