= Florida Film Critics Circle Awards 2024 =

Annual US film awards ceremony

29th FFCC Awards

December 20, 2024

Best Picture:
The Beast

The 29th Florida Film Critics Circle Awards were held on December 20, 2024.

Conclave led the nominations with eight, followed by Anora with seven. The French-Canadian co-produced science fiction drama film The Beast, a loose adaptation of the 1903 novella The Beast in the Jungle by Henry James, won Best Picture as well as Best Director (for Bertrand Bonello) and Best Actress (for Léa Seydoux).

== Winners and nominees ==
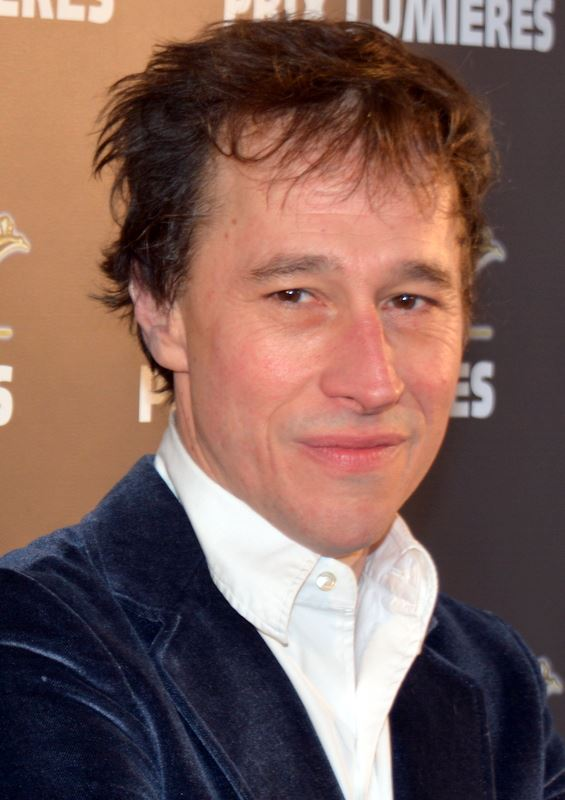
Bertrand Bonello, Best Director winner

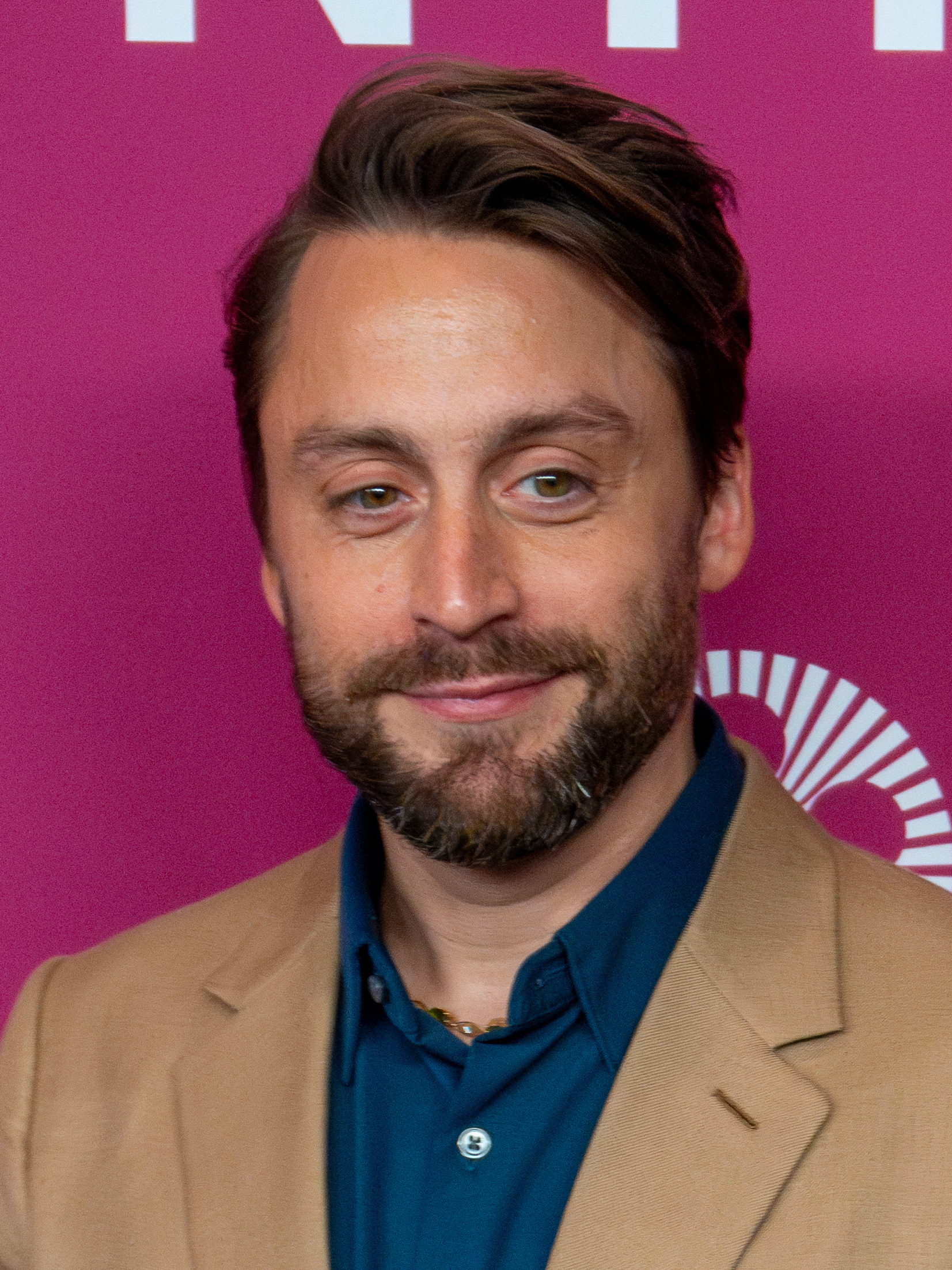
Kieran Culkin, Best Actor winner

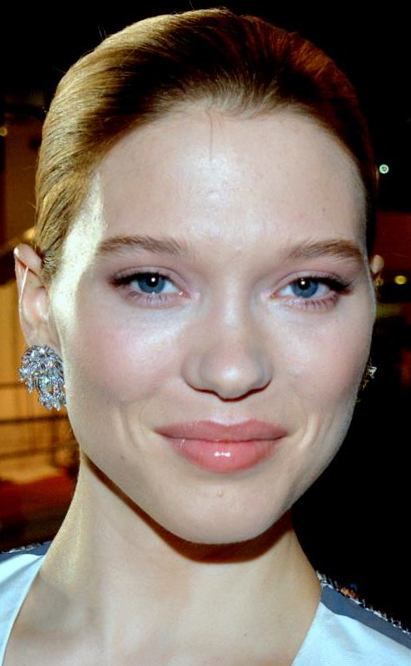
Léa Seydoux, Best Actress winner

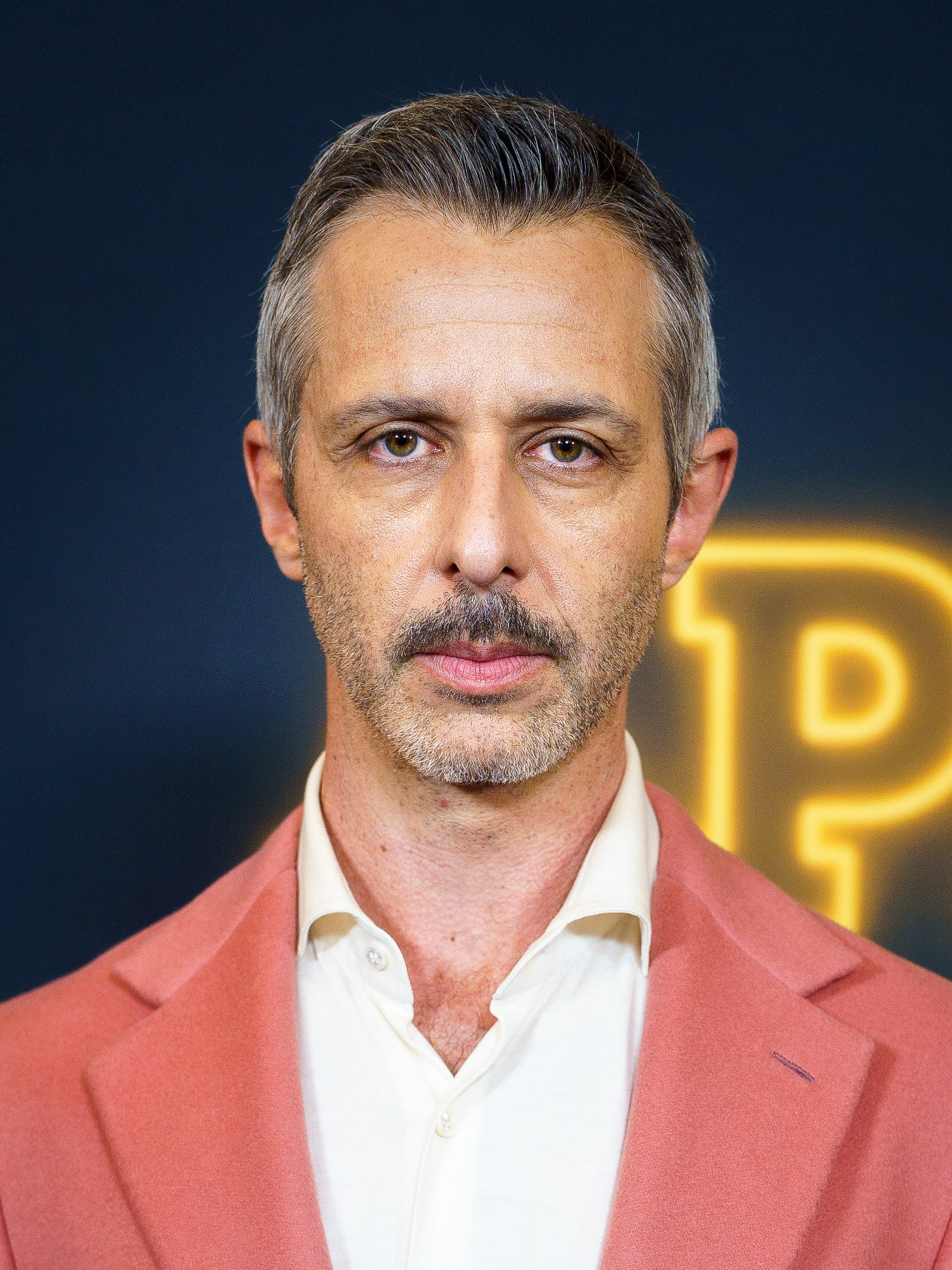
Jeremy Strong, Best Supporting Actor winner

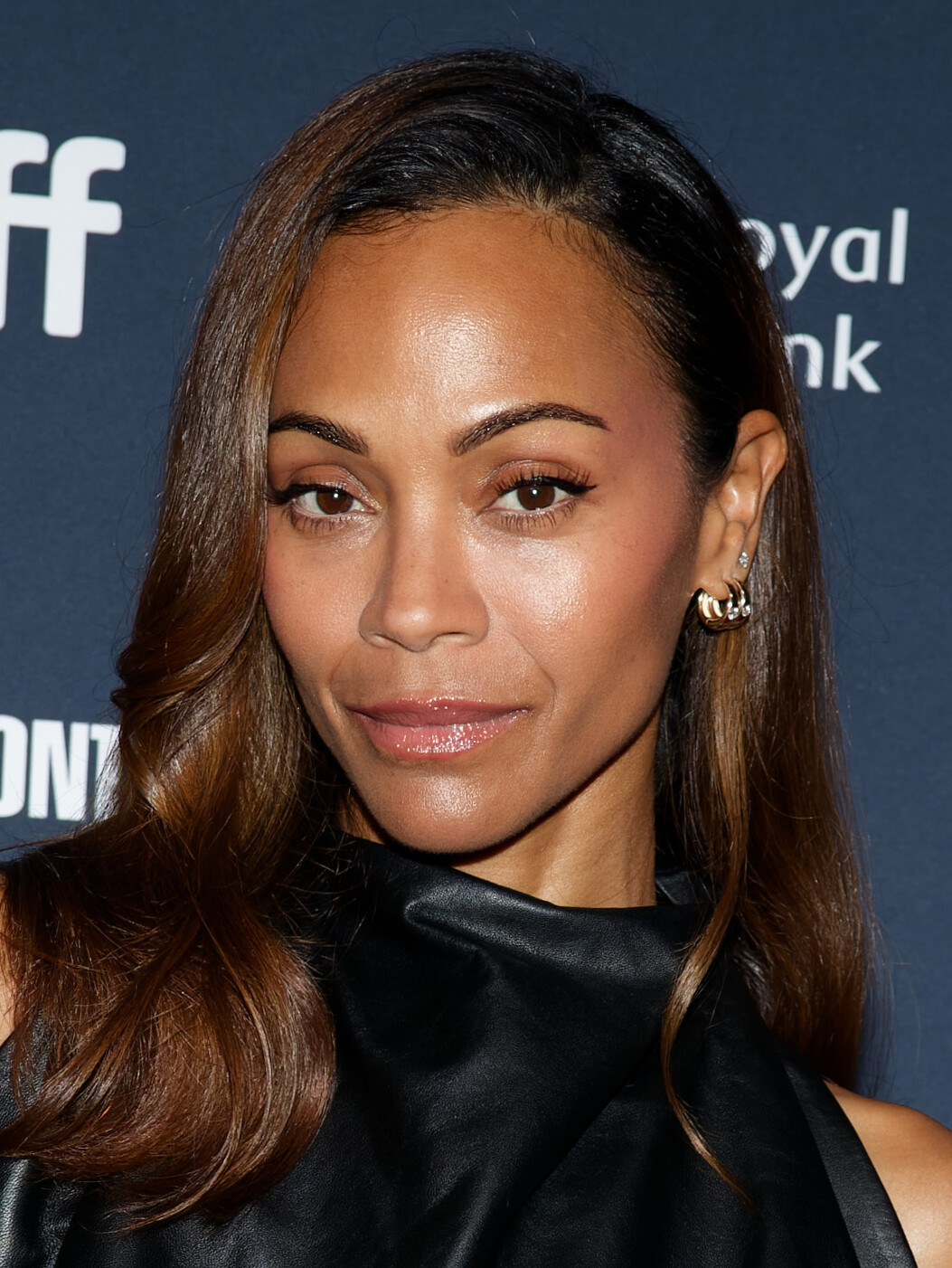
Zoe Saldaña, Best Supporting Actress winner

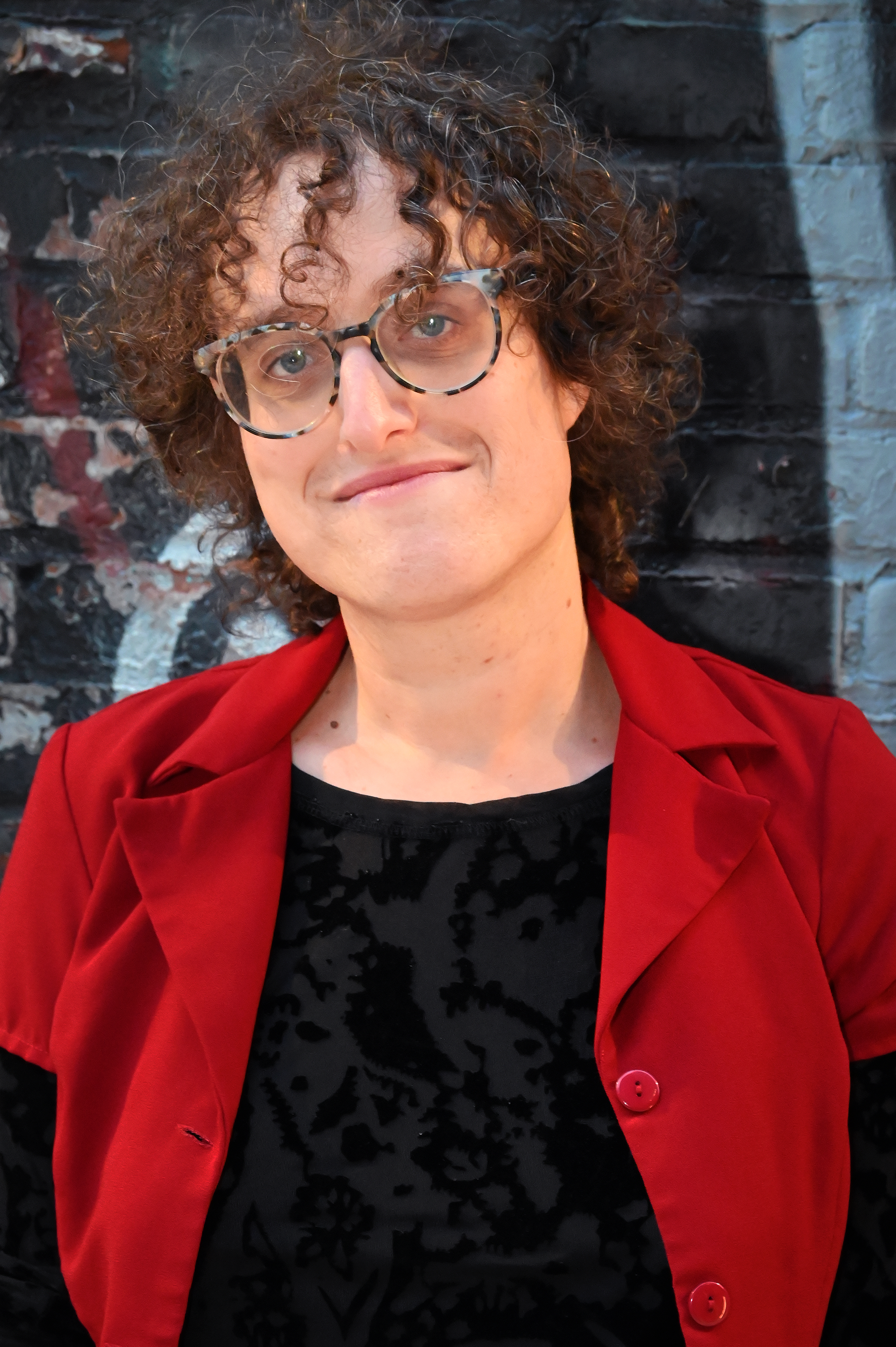
Jane Schoenbrun, Best Original Screenplay winner

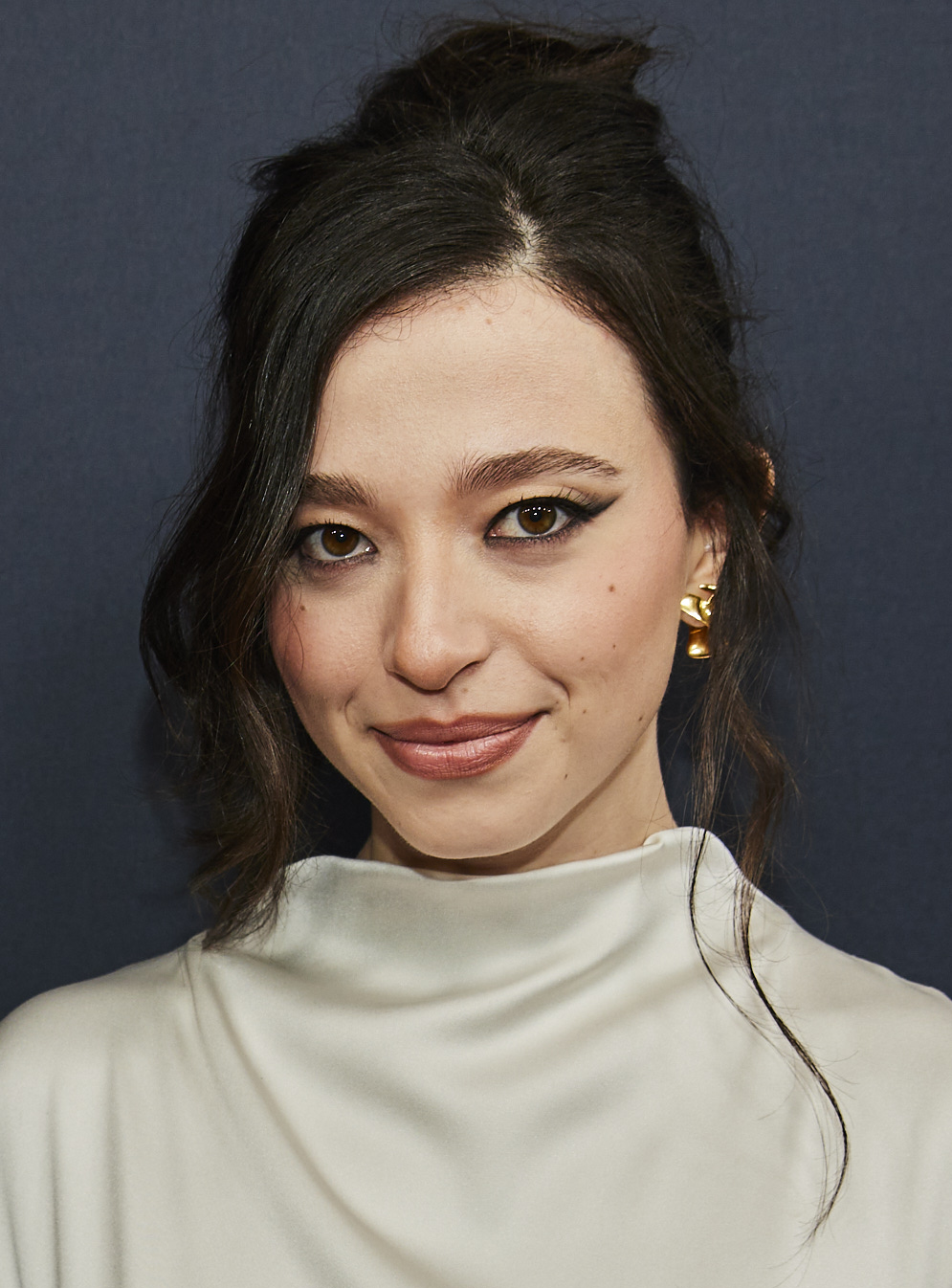
Mikey Madison, Breakout Performance winner

Winners are listed at the top of each list in bold.

Best Picture	Best Director
**The Beast**; Anora; The Brutalist; Conclave; Hundreds of Beavers	**Bertrand Bonello – The Beast**; Sean Baker – Anora; Luca Guadagnino – Challengers; Payal Kapadia – All We Imagine as Light; RaMell Ross – Nickel Boys
Best Actor	Best Actress
**Kieran Culkin – A Real Pain as Benji Kaplan**; Adrien Brody – The Brutalist as László Tóth; Daniel Craig – Queer as William Lee; Ralph Fiennes – Conclave as Cardinal Thomas Lawrence; Josh O'Connor – Challengers as Patrick Zweig	**Léa Seydoux – The Beast as Gabrielle**; Marianne Jean-Baptiste – Hard Truths as Pansy Deacon; Carol Kane – Between the Temples as Carla Kessler; Nicole Kidman – Babygirl as Romy Mathis; Mikey Madison – Anora as Anora "Ani" Mikheeva
Best Supporting Actor	Best Supporting Actress
**Jeremy Strong – The Apprentice as Roy Cohn**; Yura Borisov – Anora as Igor; Willem Dafoe – Kinds of Kindness as Raymond, George, and Omi; Adam Pearson – A Different Man as Oswald; Denzel Washington – Gladiator II as Macrinus	**Zoe Saldaña – Emilia Pérez as Rita Mora Castro**; Anna Baryshnikov – Love Lies Bleeding as Daisy; Aunjanue Ellis-Taylor – Nickel Boys as Hattie; Margaret Qualley – The Substance as Sue; Isabella Rossellini – Conclave as Sister Agnes
Best Original Screenplay	Best Adapted Screenplay
**I Saw the TV Glow – Jane Schoenbrun**; Anora – Sean Baker; Challengers – Justin Kuritzkes; Evil Does Not Exist – Ryusuke Hamaguchi; A Real Pain – Jesse Eisenberg	**Queer – Justin Kuritzkes**; The Beast – Bertrand Bonello, Benjamin Charbit, and Guillaume Bréaud; Conclave – Peter Straughan; Dune: Part Two – Denis Villeneuve and Jon Spaihts; Nickel Boys – RaMell Ross and Joslyn Barnes
Best Animated Film	Best Documentary Film
**Flow**; The Colors Within; Inside Out 2; Memoir of a Snail; The Wild Robot	**Soundtrack to a Coup d'Etat**; Daughters; No Other Land; Super/Man: The Christopher Reeve Story; Will & Harper
Best International Film	Best Ensemble
**All We Imagine as Light**; Do Not Expect Too Much from the End of the World; Emilia Pérez; I'm Still Here; The Seed of the Sacred Fig	**Conclave**; All We Imagine as Light; Anora; Challengers; Saturday Night
Best Art Direction / Production Design	Best Cinematography
**Dune: Part Two**; The Beast; The Brutalist; Conclave; Maria	**The Brutalist – Lol Crawley**; Challengers – Sayombhu Mukdeeprom; Conclave – Stéphane Fontaine; Dune: Part Two – Greig Fraser; Nickel Boys – Jomo Fray
Best Original Score	Best Visual Effects
**Challengers – Trent Reznor and Atticus Ross**; The Brutalist – Daniel Blumberg; Conclave – Volker Bertelmann; Dune: Part Two – Hans Zimmer; Flow – Gints Zilbalodis and Rihards Zalupe	**Dune: Part Two**; Hundreds of Beavers; The Substance; Tuesday; Wicked
Best First Feature	Breakout Performance
**Hundreds of Beavers – Mike Cheslik**; Janet Planet – Annie Baker; The People's Joker – Vera Drew; Stress Positions – Theda Hammel; Tuesday – Daina O. Pusić	**Mikey Madison – Anora as Anora "Ani" Mikheeva**; Jack Haven – I Saw the TV Glow as Maddy Wilson; Katy O'Brian – Love Lies Bleeding as Jacqueline "Jackie" Cleaver; Ryland Brickson Cole Tews – Hundreds of Beavers as Jean Kayak; Zoe Ziegler – Janet Planet as Lacy
Golden Orange
**Mountains (Monica Sorelle)**
