= Florida Film Critics Circle Awards 2022 =

Annual US film awards ceremony

27th FFCC Awards

December 22, 2022

Best Picture:
Everything Everywhere All at Once

The 27th Florida Film Critics Circle Awards were held on December 22, 2022.

The nominations were announced on December 14, 2022, led by Everything Everywhere All at Once with eleven nominations.

== Winners and nominees ==
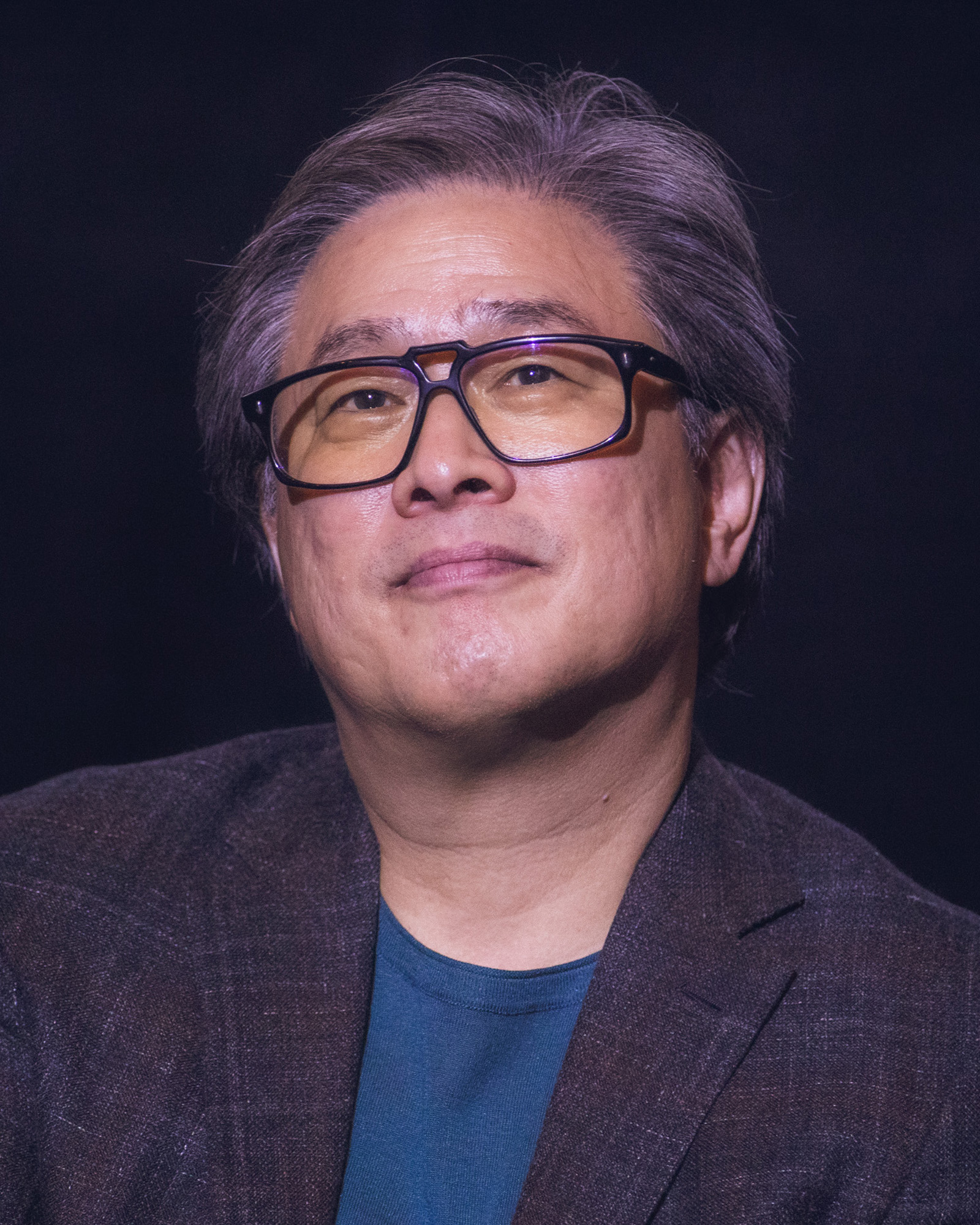
Park Chan-wook, Best Director winner and Best Original Screenplay co-winner

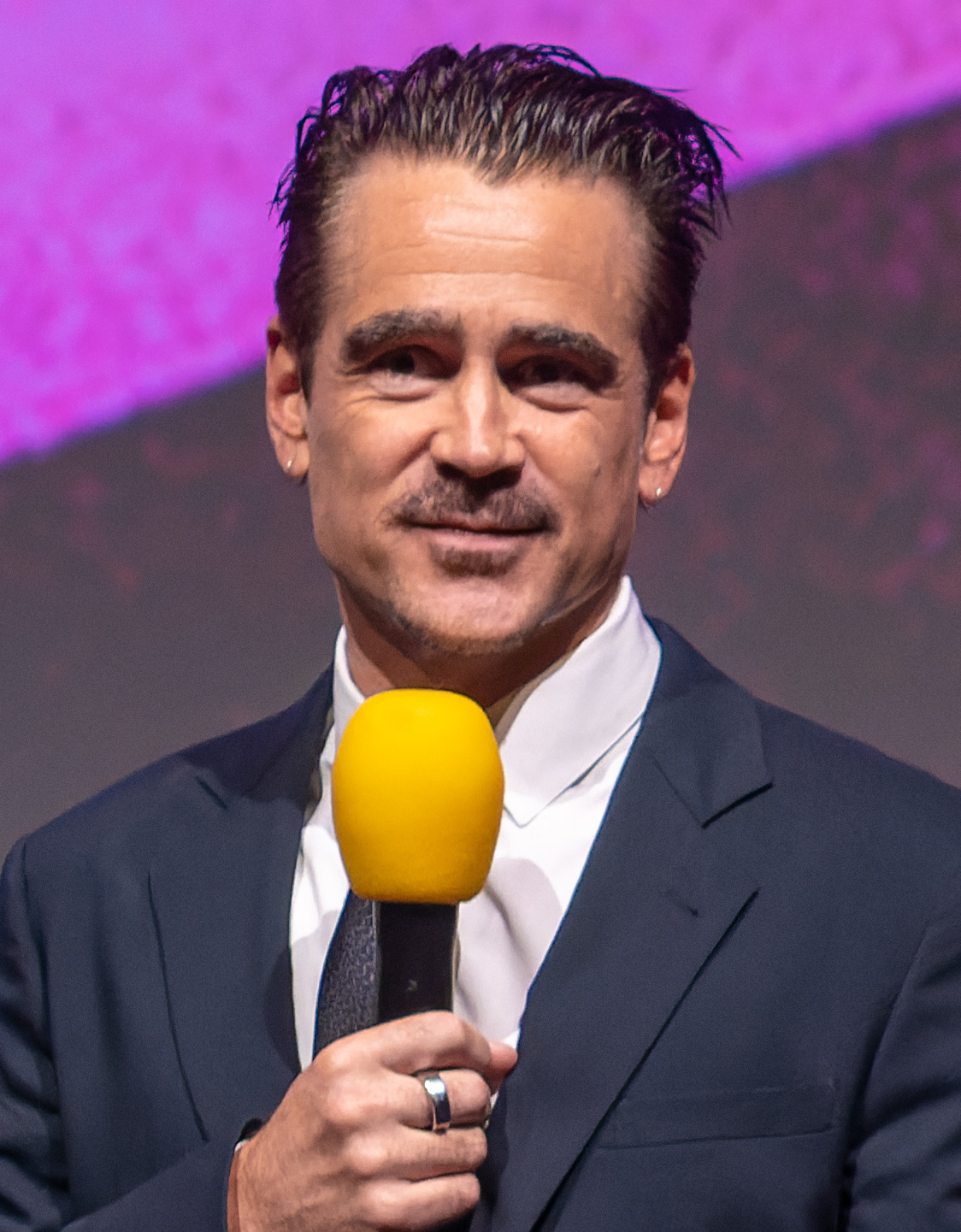
Colin Farrell, Best Actor winner

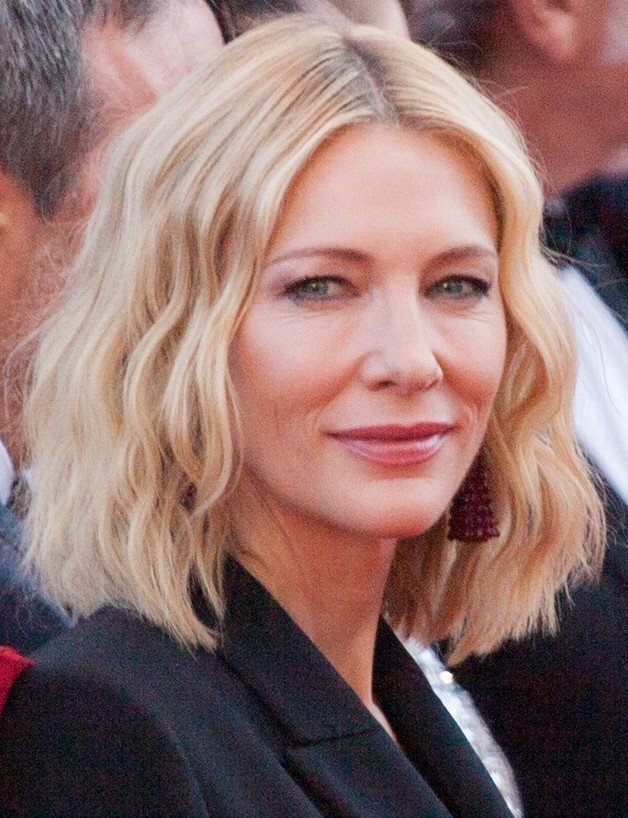
Cate Blanchett, Best Actress winner

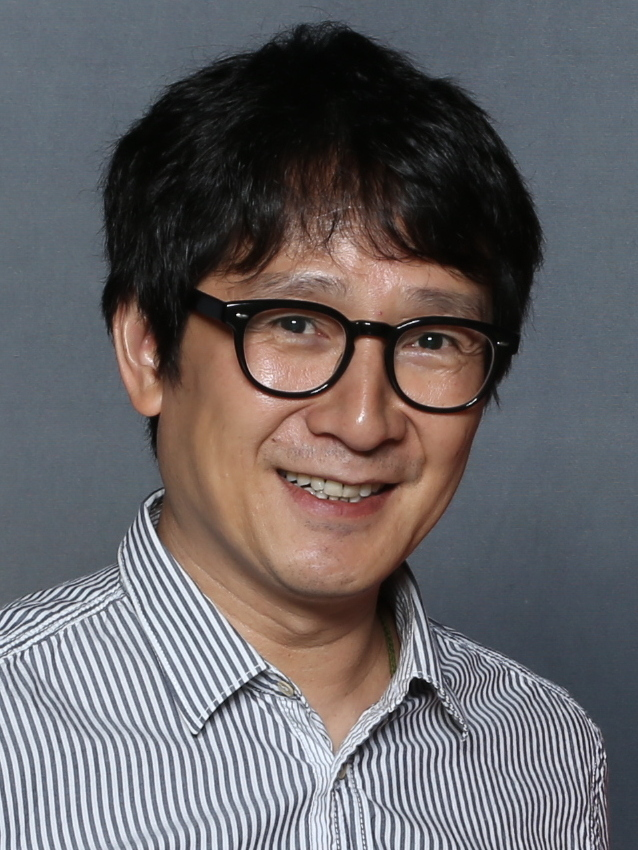
Ke Huy Quan, Best Supporting Actor winner

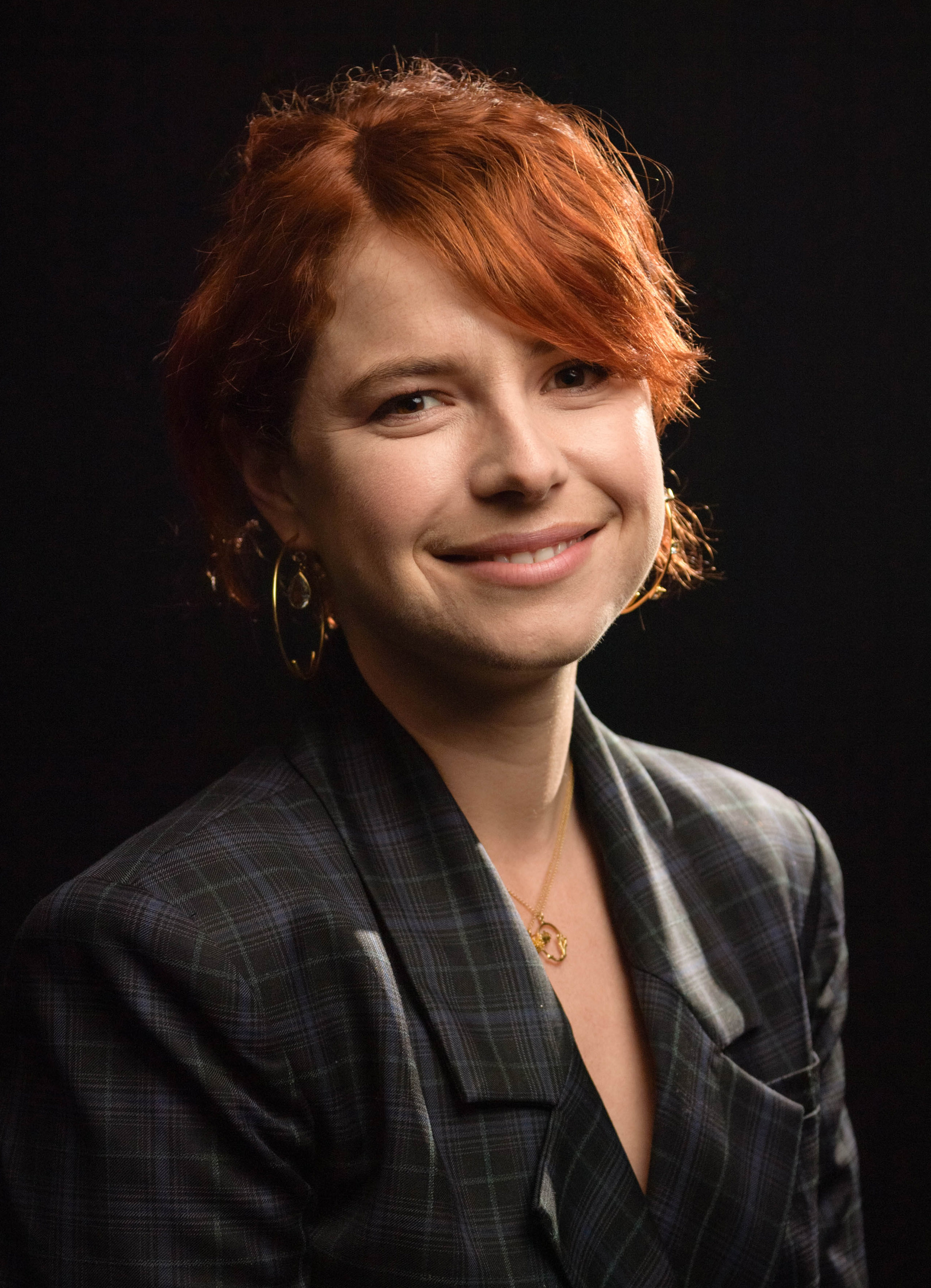
Jessie Buckley, Best Supporting Actress co-winner

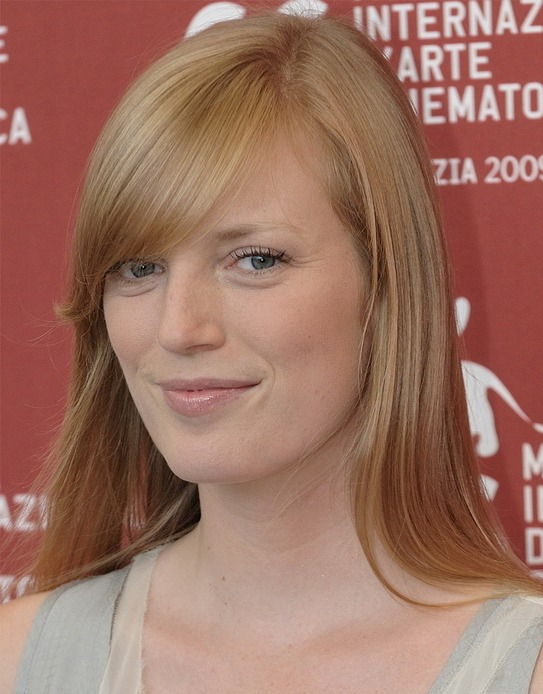
Sarah Polley, Best Adapted Screenplay winner

Winners are listed at the top of each list in bold, while the runner-ups for each category are listed under them.

Best Picture	Best Director
**Everything Everywhere All at Once**: Runner-up: Decision to Leave; Aftersun; The Fabelmans; Tár	**Park Chan-wook – Decision to Leave**: Runner-up: Steven Spielberg – The Fabelmans; Todd Field – Tár; Daniel Kwan and Daniel Scheinert – Everything Everywhere All at Once; Charlotte Wells – Aftersun
Best Actor	Best Actress
**Colin Farrell – The Banshees of Inisherin as Pádraic Súilleabháin**: Runner-up: Brendan Fraser – The Whale as Charlie; Runner-up: Park Hae-il – Decision to Leave as Jang Hae-joon; Austin Butler – Elvis as Elvis Presley; Paul Mescal – Aftersun as Calum Paterson	**Cate Blanchett – Tár as Lydia Tár**: Runner-up: Tang Wei – Decision to Leave as Song Seo-rae; Danielle Deadwyler – Till as Mamie Till-Mobley; Michelle Williams – The Fabelmans as Mitzi Schildkraut-Fabelman; Michelle Yeoh – Everything Everywhere All at Once as Evelyn Quan Wang
Best Supporting Actor	Best Supporting Actress
**Ke Huy Quan – Everything Everywhere All at Once as Waymond Wang**: Runner-up: Paul Dano – The Fabelmans as Burt Fabelman; Brendan Gleeson – The Banshees of Inisherin as Colm Doherty	**Jessie Buckley – Women Talking as Mariche (TIE)**; **Nina Hoss – Tár as Sharon Goodnow (TIE)**: Kerry Condon – The Banshees of Inisherin as Siobhán Súilleabháin; Jamie Lee Curtis – Everything Everywhere All at Once as Deirdre Beaubeirdre; Stephanie Hsu – Everything Everywhere All at Once as Joy Wang / Jobu Tupaki
Best Original Screenplay	Best Adapted Screenplay
**Park Chan-wook and Jeong Seo-Gyeong – Decision to Leave**: Runner-up: Daniel Kwan and Daniel Scheinert – Everything Everywhere All at Once; Runner-up: Martin McDonagh – The Banshees of Inisherin; Todd Field – Tár; Steven Spielberg and Tony Kushner – The Fabelmans	**Sarah Polley – Women Talking**: Runner-up: Rebecca Lenkiewicz – She Said; Runner-up: George Miller and Augusta Gore – Three Thousand Years of Longing; Guillermo del Toro, Matthew Robbins, Gris Grimly, and Patrick McHale – Guillermo del Toro's Pinocchio; Rian Johnson – Glass Onion: A Knives Out Mystery
Best Animated Film	Best Documentary Film
**Turning Red**: Guillermo del Toro's Pinocchio; Inu-Oh; Marcel the Shell with Shoes On	**All the Beauty and the Bloodshed**: Descendant; Fire of Love; Good Night Oppy; Moonage Daydream
Best International Film	Best Ensemble
**Decision to Leave**: Playground; RRR; Saint Omer	**Everything Everywhere All at Once**: Runner-up: Babylon; The Banshees of Inisherin; The Fabelmans
Best Art Direction / Production Design	Best Cinematography
**Babylon**: Runner-up: Crimes of the Future; Elvis; RRR	**Kim Ji-yong – Decision to Leave**: Runner-up: Claudio Miranda – Top Gun: Maverick; Roger Deakins – Empire of Light; Janusz Kamiński – The Fabelmans
Best Score	Best Visual Effects
**Justin Hurwitz – Babylon**: Runner-up: Michael Abels – Nope; Runner-up: Trent Reznor and Atticus Ross – Empire of Light; Son Lux – Everything Everywhere All at Once; John Williams – The Fabelmans	**Avatar: The Way of Water**: Runner-up: Nope; Doctor Strange in the Multiverse of Madness; Everything Everywhere All at Once; Top Gun: Maverick
Best First Film	Breakout Award
**Charlotte Wells – Aftersun**: Runner-up: John Patton Ford – Emily the Criminal; Lila Neugebauer – Causeway; Goran Stolevski – You Won't Be Alone	**Austin Butler – Elvis as Elvis Presley**: Runner-up: Frankie Corio – Aftersun as Sophie Paterson; Anna Cobb – We're All Going to the World's Fair as Casey; Stephanie Hsu – Everything Everywhere All at Once as Joy Wang / Jobu Tupaki
Golden Orange
**Ondi Timoner and Polk Theatre**
