= Kayije Kagame =

Rwandan–Swiss artist and actress (born 1987)

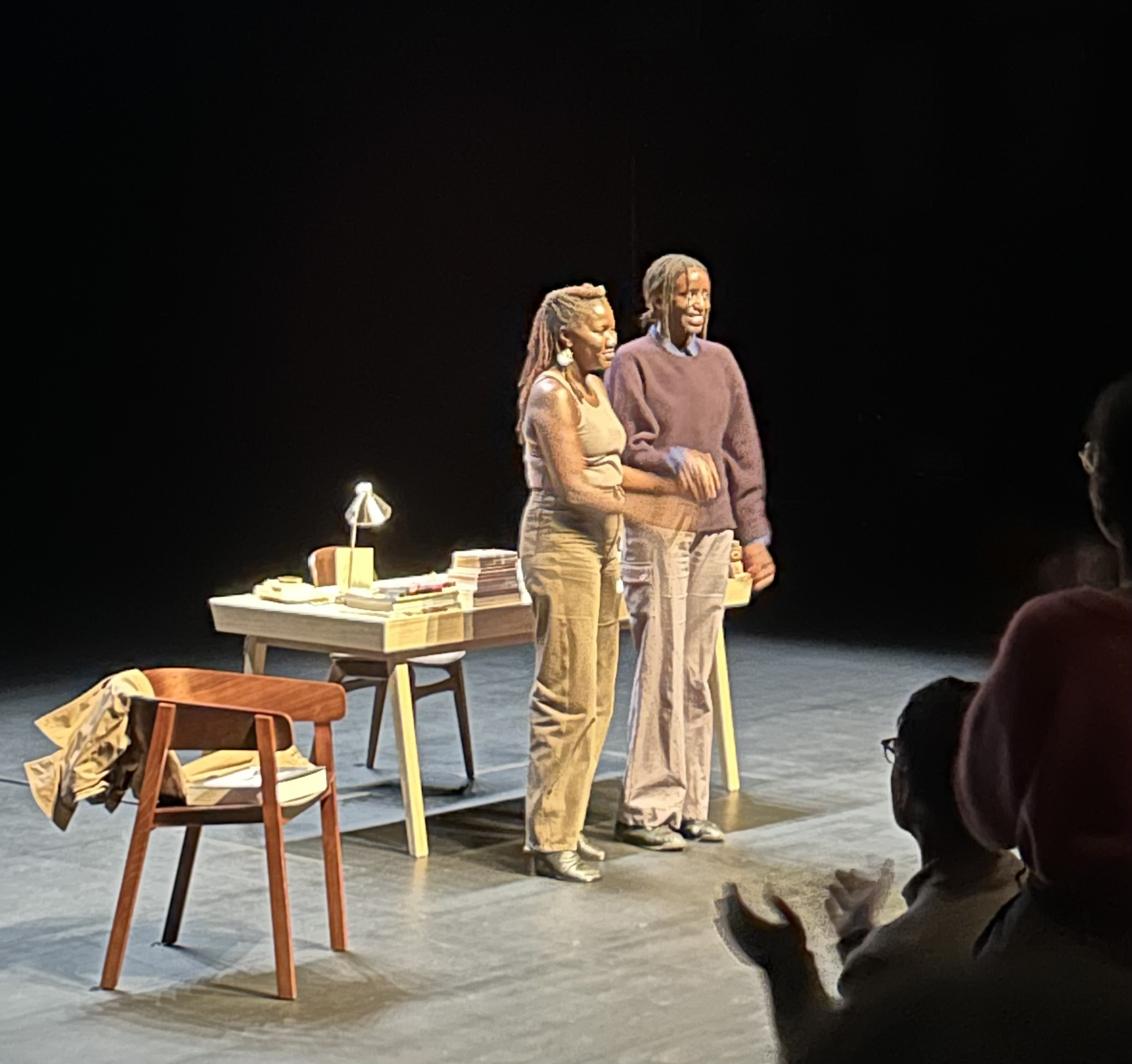
- Born: 1987 (age 38–39); Geneva, Switzerland
- Occupations: Actress; artist

Kayije Kagame (born 1987) is a Rwandan–Swiss contemporary artist and actress.

== Life and career ==
Kagame was born into a Rwandan family in Geneva in 1987. Her father, Faustin, is a prominent political journalist and advisor to President of Rwanda Paul Kagame (no relation); her mother is a teacher of history and French. One of her siblings is filmmaker Shyaka Kagame. Kayije became interested in acting at age 19 when she ran into director Raffaele Curi in Rome and he offered her a role in a play. She studied theater at the Conservatoire de Musique de Genève for a year, then in 2010 enrolled in the Ecole Nationale Supérieure des Arts et Techniques du Théâtre (ENSATT) in Lyon. In 2014, she attended a summer training program in New York hosted by theater director Robert Wilson, who cast her that year in his revival of Les Nègres at the Odéon in Paris.

In art, Kagame has made short films, sound installations, and other installations and performance pieces. In 2019, with other artists, Kagame staged So Long Lives This, and This Gives Life to Thee, a piece that took up every part of the building of the Théâtre de l'Usine in Geneva. The same year, Kagame and actress Grace Seri toured with Sans Grace/Avec Grace, a two-part performance piece. In 2022, she and filmmaker Hugo Radi began touring Intérieur Vie/Intérieur Nuit, a similar work that is half staged and half filmed.

In Alice Diop's Saint Omer (2022), Kagame made her feature film debut playing Rama, a pregnant writer observing a woman (played by Guslagie Malanda) on trial for killing her own one-year-old daughter. Kagame's character has a real-life analogue in Diop, who attended the trial the film is based on. A. O. Scott of The New York Times complimented Kagame's "seething, quiet performance", and IndieWire praised her "effortless elegance". Kagame was chosen as one of the Révélations at the 48th César Awards, and European Film Promotion (EFP) named her one of 2023's Shooting Stars.
