= The Beast (2023 film) =

2023 film by Bertrand Bonello

- Theatrical release poster
- French: La Bête
- Directed by: Bertrand Bonello
- Screenplay by: Bertrand Bonello
- Story by: Bertrand Bonello; Benjamin Charbit; Guillaume Bréaud
- Based on: The Beast in the Jungle by Henry James
- Produced by: Justin Taurand; Bertrand Bonello
- Starring: Léa Seydoux; George MacKay; Guslagie Malanda; Dasha Nekrasova; Martin Scali; Elina Löwensohn; Marta Hoskins; Julia Faure; Kester Lovelace; Félicien Pinot; Laurent Lacotte
- Cinematography: Josée Deshaies
- Edited by: Anita Roth
- Music by: Bertrand Bonello; Anna Bonello
- Production companies: Les Films du Bélier; My New Picture; Sons of Manual; Arte France Cinéma; AMI Paris
- Distributed by: Ad Vitam (France); Maison 4:3 (Canada)
- Release dates: 3 September 2023 (Venice); 7 February 2024 (France); 19 April 2024 (Canada)
- Running time: 145 minutes
- Countries: France; Canada
- Languages: French; English
- Budget: €7.5 million
- Box office: $824,382

The Beast (French: La Bête) is a 2023 science fiction romantic drama film written and directed by Bertrand Bonello from a story he co-wrote with Guillaume Bréaud and Benjamin Charbit. A co-production between France and Canada, the film is loosely based on Henry James's 1903 novella The Beast in the Jungle. It stars Léa Seydoux and George MacKay, with Guslagie Malanda, Dasha Nekrasova, Martin Scali, Elina Löwensohn, Marta Hoskins, Julia Faure, Kester Lovelace, Félicien Pinot and Laurent Lacotte in supporting roles.

The Beast had its world premiere on 3 September 2023 at the 80th Venice International Film Festival as part of the official competition. The film was released theatrically in France on 7 February 2024 by Ad Vitam and in Canada on 19 April by Maison 4:3.

== Plot ==
In 2044, artificial intelligence (AI) has taken over most of the jobs in the world. Although AI is credited with saving the world by stopping climate change, it has a low opinion of humans, and deems most of them incapable of making rational decisions (or holding jobs that require advanced thought) due to their emotions. At the AI's suggestion, one such human, Gabrielle, agrees to undergo a process to purify her DNA, which should remove her strong emotions and make her eligible for better jobs. On a trip to the purification centre, she meets Louis, another candidate for treatment. They are instantly drawn to each other.

As part of the purification process, Gabrielle views memories of her past lives. Between purification sessions, Gabrielle is monitored by Kelly, an android who takes her to a mysterious nightclub which periodically switches between decade-based themes (i.e., the 1960s to 1980s).

Gabrielle's first purification session takes her to a past life in 1910 France. There, she is an acclaimed pianist and owns a doll-making factory with her husband, Georges. One night at a salon, she runs into Louis, whom she met in Naples six years before. On that earlier occasion, she confessed her lifelong private fear that some kind of horrible catastrophe would happen, an idea she constantly ruminates on. Louis takes her to visit an uncannily accurate medium. Despite Gabrielle being married, the two begin spending more time together, although Gabrielle's fear prevents her from starting an affair with Louis. She invites him to visit the factory, but the factory gets flooded, and the flammable dolls trigger a fire. Louis and Gabrielle drown while trying to escape.

In 2044, Gabrielle runs into Louis at the club. He tells her he is still hesitant about undergoing purification for fear of losing the ability to feel. They agree to delay purification for several days, but Gabrielle goes to the clinic anyway.

Gabrielle's second purification session takes her to a past life in 2014 Los Angeles. There, she is an underemployed model and actress who makes ends meet by house-sitting for an architect's lavish home. In this incarnation Louis is an incel and stalker, who makes videos complaining that women do not notice him. He follows Gabrielle home but cannot bring himself to approach her. Gabrielle encounters the medium again, still uncannily accurate, in the form of a pop-up ad from a virus. Following an earthquake, Gabrielle approaches Louis and asks him to walk her home, but he rebuffs her, telling himself that she is merely setting him up for further humiliation. Gabrielle hears Roy Orbison's 1962 song "Evergreen" on television and begins to cry. She hallucinates having sex with Louis, who confesses having the same lifelong fears that she has.

In 2044, Gabrielle visits the club, but Louis is gone. She wonders why the song made her cry.

Gabrielle's third purification session revisits the 2014 narrative. Louis breaks into the house with a pistol, swearing to "revenge" himself on women. He corners Gabrielle in a bathroom, where she pleads with him that he actually means no harm and to trust her. Louis is noticeably torn between love and hate. She opens the door to connect with him, but the scene cuts to reveal Louis with the pistol in hand staring at Gabrielle lying dead face-down in the pool.

Back in 2044, the AI announces that the purification has failed, an outcome that happens to only 0.7% of the population. Although Gabrielle is stuck in her unfulfilling job, she finds a silver lining by asking Louis to meet her at the club. They dance together to "Evergreen", and Louis recognizes the song, revealing that he too has seen their past lives through purification. He proudly announces that he now has a job at the Ministry of Justice. Although he claims he still loves Gabrielle, she realizes he can no longer feel love in the same way. Gabrielle falls on her knees and screams in anguish.

In a mid-credits scene, the medium calls out to 2014 Gabrielle not to go into the 2044 DNA purification room, before a gunshot is heard.

== Cast ==
- Léa Seydoux as Gabrielle
- George MacKay as Louis
- Guslagie Malanda as Poupée Kelly
- Dasha Nekrasova as Dakota
- Martin Scali as Georges
- Elina Löwensohn as the medium
- Marta Hoskins as Gina
- Julia Faure as Sophie
- Kester Lovelace as Tom
- Félicien Pinot as Augustin
- Laurent Lacotte as the architect
- Weronika Szawarska as Veronica
- Jasmine Van Deventer as woman making dolls
- Xavier Dolan as the A.I system (voice)
- Bertrand Bonello as the director (voice)

== Production ==
=== Development ===
The project was announced in 2021, when on 20 January, the French magazine Les Inrockuptibles reported that on 14 January, Arte France Cinéma had allocated resources for Bertrand Bonello's next film, La Bête, a sci-fi melodrama starring Gaspard Ulliel and Léa Seydoux.

Bonello started writing the screenplay for the film in 2017, with Gaspard Ulliel and Léa Seydoux in mind for the lead roles, after working with both of them in the 2014 film Saint Laurent. The script, loosely based on Henry James's 1903 novella The Beast in the Jungle, was written by Bonello, with contributions from Guillaume Bréaud and Benjamin Charbit. The 2014 incel version of Louis was based on Elliot Rodger, a mass murderer responsible for 2014 Isla Vista killings.

After Ulliel's death in January 2022, Bonello told Variety on 13 February 2022 that he would likely re-cast his role for a non-French actor, explaining later that he wanted to avoid any comparisons with Ulliel and so decided to look for an American or British actor instead.

On 16 May 2022, Variety reported that British actor George MacKay was cast as the male lead. Found through an American casting director, MacKay was the last actor that Bonello auditioned for the role; after a few minutes of the audition in London, Bonello concluded that MacKay was the right person for the role. Variety also reported that the film would be set in Paris and California, with its dialogue in French and English, and that filming was scheduled to start in August 2022. Bonello said that the only thing he changed in the script after MacKay's casting was that the 1910 segment of the film was re-written half in French and half in English. On 4 September 2022, Seydoux told Deadline that MacKay had learned French for his part in the film, and that filming would resume in late October.

In June 2023, Bonello said in an interview with French magazine Paris Match that The Beast was the film he was "the most proud of today".

The film was co-produced by France's Les Films du Bélier and Bonello's My New Picture, in collaboration with Arte France Cinéma, AMI Paris, and Québec-based production company Sons of Manual. Bonello produced the film with Justin Taurand (under his banner Les Films du Bélier), alongside co-producers Xavier Dolan and Nancy Grant (co-owners of Sons of Manual).

=== Filming ===
Filming was postponed due to the COVID-19 pandemic and was scheduled to start in April 2022. Bonello directed his 2022 film Coma in the meantime, featuring Gaspard Ulliel in his last film appearance. Ulliel's death from a skiing accident on 19 January 2022 delayed the filming of The Beast again.

Principal photography began in Paris on 22 August 2022, with filming also taking place in Los Angeles for a couple of nights, with a small crew and with no authorisation. Filming wrapped in October 2022.

=== Post-production ===
The film ends with a QR code that encodes the URL of a video of the film's credits roll, in lieu of having closing credits itself. Bonello made this decision during the editing, because he wanted to evoke the "brutality" of old films that ended without credits, and because that "fit well with the dehumanization of the film at that moment in 2044".

== Release ==
The Beast had its world premiere at the 80th Venice International Film Festival on 3 September 2023, with its North American premiere at the 2023 Toronto International Film Festival later that month. The film was also invited at the 28th Busan International Film Festival in 'Gala Presentation' section, where it was screened on 6 October 2023. It was also selected to the Golden Spike competition of the 68th Valladolid International Film Festival.

Bonello told IndieWire that the film was rejected by the Cannes Film Festival.

With its international sales handled by Kinology, the film was originally set to be released theatrically in France by Ad Vitam on 8 November 2023, but the release date was pushed back to 28 February 2024, and then pushed forward to 7 February 2024. The total number of viewers in France during its theatrical run between 7 February and 10 April was 88,273.

The film's DVD and Blu-ray release was set for December 2024 by The Criterion Collection, to be released as part of their Janus Contemporaries line of releases.

== Reception ==
=== Critical response ===
The Beast received an average grade of 3.7 out of 5 stars on the French website AlloCiné, based on 38 reviews. On the review aggregator website Rotten Tomatoes, 86% of 144 critics' reviews are positive, with an average rating of 7.6/10. The website's consensus reads: "Unwieldy but rewarding, The Beast uses its sci-fi conceit to explore intriguing themes in largely satisfying fashion." Metacritic, which uses a weighted average, assigned the film a score of 80 out of 100, based on 35 critics, indicating "generally favorable" reviews.

In June 2025, IndieWire ranked the film at number 15 on its list of "The 100 Best Movies of the 2020s (So Far)."

=== Accolades ===
List of awards and nominations for The Beast
Award or film festival	Date of ceremony	Category	Recipient(s)	Result	Ref.
Venice International Film Festival	9 September 2023	Golden Lion	Bertrand Bonello	Nominated	
Valladolid International Film Festival	28 October 2023	Golden Spike	The Beast	Nominated	
Valladolid International Film Festival	28 October 2023	Best Actress	Léa Seydoux	Won	
Florida Film Critics Circle	20 December 2024	Best Picture	The Beast	Won	
Florida Film Critics Circle	20 December 2024	Best Director	Bertrand Bonello	Won	
Florida Film Critics Circle	20 December 2024	Best Actress	Léa Seydoux	Won	
Florida Film Critics Circle	20 December 2024	Best Adapted Screenplay	Bertrand Bonello, Benjamin Charbit, and Guillaume Bréaud	Nominated	
Florida Film Critics Circle	20 December 2024	Best Art Direction / Production Design	The Beast	Nominated	
Lumière Awards	20 January 2025	Best Cinematography	Josée Deshaies	Nominated	
Lumière Awards	20 January 2025	Best Music	Bertrand Bonello and Anna Bonello	Nominated	

== See also ==
- The Beast in the Jungle, 2023 French film based on the same 1903 novella by Henry James
