= Malanda (surname) =

Malanda is a surname. Notable people with this surname includes:

- Adilson Malanda (born 2001), French footballer
- Guslagie Malanda (born 1990), French actress
- Junior Malanda (1994–2015), Belgian footballer
