= Saint Omer (film) =

2022 film by Alice Diop

- Theatrical release poster
- Directed by: Alice Diop
- Screenplay by: Alice Diop; Amrita David; Marie NDiaye
- Produced by: Toufik Ayadi; Christophe Barral
- Starring: Kayije Kagame; Guslagie Malanda; Valérie Dréville; Aurélia Petit; Xavier Maly; Robert Canterella; Salimata Kamate; Thomas de Pourquery
- Cinematography: Claire Mathon
- Edited by: Amrita David
- Music by: Thibault Deboaisne
- Production company: Srab Films
- Distributed by: Les Films du Losange
- Release dates: 7 September 2022 (Venice); 23 November 2022 (France)
- Running time: 122 minutes
- Country: France
- Language: French
- Box office: $822,891

Saint Omer is a 2022 French legal drama film written and directed by Alice Diop, and starring Kayije Kagame and Guslagie Malanda. It is Diop's first narrative feature; her other films have been documentaries. The film is based on the French court case of Fabienne Kabou, who was convicted in 2016 of murdering her infant by drowning. Diop attended Kabou's trial.

Rama (Kagame) is a young pregnant novelist who attends the trial of Laurence Coly (Malanda), a Senegalese woman accused of murdering her 15-month-old child by leaving her on a beach to be swept away. Rama imagines writing about the event as a literary retelling of the Greek tragedy Medea.

The film premiered in-competition at the 79th Venice International Film Festival on 7 September 2022, where it won the Grand Jury Prize and the Lion of the Future. Additional screenings were held at the 2022 Toronto International Film Festival and the 2022 New York Film Festival before theatrical release in France on 23 November 2022. The film was selected as the French entry for the Best International Feature Film at the 95th Academy Awards, and made the December shortlist. The film won the Grand Prix for Best Film at Film Fest Gent in 2022.

== Plot ==
Rama, a literature professor and novelist, travels from Paris to Saint-Omer to observe the trial of Laurence Coly and write about the case. Coly is a graduate student and Senegalese immigrant who is charged with the murder of her 15-month-old daughter, having left her on a beach to be drowned by the tide in Berck.

Rama is four months pregnant herself and, like Coly, is in a mixed-race relationship. She also has a complex relationship with her own Senegalese immigrant mother, and feels a personal connection to Coly. She plans to write a modern-day retelling of the Greek myth of Medea in her treatment of the case. As she learns more about Coly's life and the isolation Coly suffered from her family and society while studying and living in France, Rama becomes increasingly anxious about her own life and her pregnancy.

The film cuts before the outcome of the trial is announced. It shows Rama's return to Paris, and her spending time with her mother.

== Cast ==
- Kayije Kagame as Rama
- Guslagie Malanda as Laurence Coly
- Valérie Dréville as The Judge
- Aurélia Petit as Defence Barrister Vaudenay
- Xavier Maly as Luc Dumontet, Coly's partner
- Robert Canterella as Barrister
- Salimata Kamate as Odile Diata
- Thomas de Pourquery as Adrian, Rama's partner
- Adama Diallo Tamba as Seynabou, Rama's mother
- Mariam Diop as Khady
- Dado Diop as Tening
- Charlotte Clamens as Cécile Jobard

== Production ==
Saint Omer is based on the 2016 court case of Fabienne Kabou, who was convicted of killing her daughter in 2013, in the same way as Coly. Diop followed the case and immediately recognized Kabou's features from news footage as being Senegalese, which is Diop's family heritage. Diop attended the trial and became "obsessed" with the case, noting that most of the attendees and participants at the trial were also women. Diop elaborated that she "wanted to find answers to my own intimate questions that I had asked myself about my relationship with my own mother and being a mother myself. And I decided that since I shared those same emotions with so many women, if we were all so obsessed with that event, it meant there was something universal in the story, which had to do with motherhood. So I decided to make a film about it." Like Rama, Diop was pregnant with her first child while attending the trial. Diop said that she attended the trial out of "intuition" and did not decide to make a film about it until after the trial ended. Having only made documentary films, Diop made her narrative feature film debut because cameras were not allowed in the courtroom and she "wanted to recreate my experience of listening to another woman's story while interrogating myself, facing my own difficult truths."

Court-transcripts were partially used to write the screenplay. While writing the script, Diop first met actresses Kayije Kagame and Guslagie Malanda. She was immediately impressed with both women and thought of them while still writing the script. She later contacted both Kagame and Malanda to audition. Diop has said she has been influenced by the work of Marguerite Duras. In the film, the character Rama is seen lecturing about Duras.

Filming took six weeks. Both the cast and crew were mostly female, which "wasn't fully deliberate, nor was it wholly accidental" according to Diop. Filming took place between May and July 2021 in the Île-de-France and Hauts-de-France regions, including in the commune of Saint-Omer. Guslagie Malanda, who played the role based on Kabou, found being in character so taxing that she had nightmares for a year. Diop fainted on set when the shooting wrapped.

== Release ==
It premiered at the 79th Venice International Film Festival on 7 September 2022, where it won the Grand Jury Prize along with the Luigi De Laurentiis Lion of the Future award.

== Reception ==
=== Critical response ===
On Rotten Tomatoes, the film holds an approval rating of 94% based on 139 reviews, with an average rating of 8.2/10. The website's consensus reads, "A gut-punching contemplation of a woman's immigrant experience, Saint Omer puts a mother on the stand and the audience in the jury box to find humanity in the inhumane." According to Metacritic, which assigned a weighted average score of 91 out of 100 based on 36 critics, the film received "universal acclaim".

Manohla Dargis of The New York Times called it "Intellectually galvanizing and emotionally harrowing, the story explores motherhood, race and postcolonial France with control, lucidity and compassion."

In September 2022 it was selected as France's official selection for Best International Film at the 95th Academy Awards.

In June 2025, IndieWire ranked the film at number 32 on its list of "The 100 Best Movies of the 2020s (So Far)."

=== Accolades ===
Award	Date of ceremony	Category	Recipient(s)	Result	Ref.
Venice Film Festival	10 September 2022	Golden Lion	Alice Diop	Nominated	
Venice Film Festival	10 September 2022	Grand Jury Prize	Alice Diop	Won	
Venice Film Festival	10 September 2022	Luigi De Laurentiis Award for a Debut Film	Alice Diop	Won	
Venice Film Festival	10 September 2022	Casa Wabi – Mantarraya Award	Alice Diop	Won	
Venice Film Festival	10 September 2022	Cinema & Arts Award - Golden Musa	Alice Diop	Won	
Venice Film Festival	10 September 2022	Edipo Re Award	Alice Diop	Won	
BFI London Film Festival	16 October 2022	Best Film	Saint Omer	Nominated	
Film Fest Gent	24 October 2022	Best Film	Saint Omer	Won	
Chicago International Film Festival	21 October 2022	Gold Hugo	Saint Omer	Nominated	
Chicago International Film Festival	21 October 2022	Silver Hugo for Best Screenplay	Alice Diop, Amrita David, Zoé Galeron, and Marie NDiaye	Won	
Seville European Film Festival	12 November 2022	Golden Giraldillo	Saint Omer	Won	
Seville European Film Festival	12 November 2022	Best Screenplay	Alice Diop, Amrita David, Marie Ndiaye	Won	
Gotham Independent Film Awards	28 November 2022	Best International Feature	Saint Omer	Nominated	
Louis Delluc Prize	30 November 2022	Best Film of the Year	Saint Omer	Won	
National Board of Review	8 December 2022	Top Five Foreign Language Films	Saint Omer	Won	
European Film Awards	10 December 2022	Best Director	Alice Diop	Nominated	
Los Angeles Film Critics Association	11 December 2022	Best Foreign Language Film	Saint Omer	Runner-up	
Chicago Film Critics Association	14 December 2022	Best Foreign Language Film	Saint Omer	Nominated	
Chicago Film Critics Association	14 December 2022	Milos Stehlik Breakthrough Filmmaker Award	Alice Diop	Nominated	
Florida Film Critics Circle	22 December 2022	Best Foreign Language Film	Saint Omer	Nominated	
Alliance of Women Film Journalists	5 January 2023	Best Non-English Language Film	Saint Omer	Nominated	
Lumière Awards	16 January 2022	Best Film	Saint Omer	Nominated	
Lumière Awards	16 January 2022	Best Female Revelation	Guslagie Malanda	Nominated	
Lumière Awards	16 January 2022	Best Screenplay	Alice Diop, Marie NDiaye and Amrita David	Nominated	
Lumière Awards	16 January 2022	Best Cinematography	Claire Mathon	Nominated	
Palm Springs International Film Festival	16 January 2023	Best International Feature Film	Saint Omer	Won	
Seattle Film Critics Society	17 January 2023	Best Film Not in the English Language	Saint Omer	Nominated	
Online Film Critics Society	23 January 2023	Best Debut Feature	Saint Omer	Nominated	
London Film Critics' Circle	5 February 2023	Film of the Year	Saint Omer	Nominated	
London Film Critics' Circle	5 February 2023	Foreign Language Film of the Year	Saint Omer	Nominated	
London Film Critics' Circle	5 February 2023	Supporting Actress of the Year	Guslagie Malanda	Nominated	
Black Reel Awards	6 February 2023	Outstanding Foreign-Language Film	Saint Omer	Won	
Directors Guild of America Awards	18 February 2023	Outstanding Directorial Achievement in First-Time Theatrical Feature Film	Alice Diop	Nominated	
César Awards	24 February 2023	Most Promising Actress	Guslagie Malanda	Nominated	
César Awards	24 February 2023	Best Original Screenplay	Alice Diop, Amrita David, Marie NDiaye	Nominated	
César Awards	24 February 2023	Best First Feature Film	Toufik Ayadi, Christophe Barral, Alice Diop	Won	
César Awards	24 February 2023	Best Cinematography	Claire Mathon	Nominated	
Independent Spirit Awards	4 March 2023	Best International Film	Saint Omer	Nominated	
Toronto Film Critics Association	6 March 2023	Best Foreign Language Film	Saint Omer	Won	
Paris Film Critics Association	5 February 2023	Best Picture	Alice Diop	Nominated	
Paris Film Critics Association	5 February 2023	Best Actress	Guslagie Malanda	Nominated	
Paris Film Critics Association	5 February 2023	Best Young Actress	Guslagie Malanda	Nominated	
Paris Film Critics Association	5 February 2023	Best Young Actress	Kayjie Kagame	Nominated	
Paris Film Critics Association	5 February 2023	Best Original Screenplay	Amrita David, Alice Diop & Marie NDiaye	Nominated	

== See also ==
- List of submissions to the 95th Academy Awards for Best International Feature Film
- List of French submissions for the Academy Award for Best International Feature Film
