= Shyaka Kagame =

Rwandan filmmaker

- Born: Shyaka Kagame; 1983 (age 42–43); Geneva, Switzerland
- Occupations: Director, producer, assistant director
- Years active: 2009–present

Shyaka Kagame (born 1983) is a Rwandan–Swiss filmmaker. He is best known as the director of the critically acclaimed film Bounty (2017).

== Personal life ==
He was born in 1983 in Geneva, Switzerland, to Rwandan parents. One of his siblings is the artist Kayije Kagame.

== Career ==
Before entering cinema, Kagame studied political science. In 2009, he started his film career as an assistant director with Geneva filmmaker Frédéric Baillif. In June 2017, Kagame made his directorial debut with Bounty. The film received critical acclaim and screened at several film festivals. The documentary is noted for its lack of voice-overs, interviews and camera faces. The film deals with questions about the identity of black Afro–Swiss people.

== Filmography ==
Year	Film	Role	Genre	Ref.
2011	Believers: Who's Back?	Assistant Director	Documentary	
2017	Bounty	Director	Documentary	
