= Bounty (2017 film) =

2017 Rwandan short film

- Directed by: Shyaka Kagamé
- Written by: Shyaka Kagamé
- Produced by: Florence Adam
- Cinematography: Camille Cottagnoud
- Edited by: Janine Waeber
- Music by: DJ Deheb
- Distributed by: JMH & FILO Films
- Release date: 14 September 2017 (Switzerland)
- Running time: 80 min.
- Countries: Rwanda; Switzerland
- Language: Kinyarwanda

Bounty, is a 2017 Rwandan documentary film directed by Shyaka Kagamé and produced by Florence Adam for Les Productions JMH.

The film received positive reviews and won several awards at international film festivals. The film received critical acclaim and screened at several film festivals.

== Cast ==
- Ayan
- Bacary Egger
- Jeffrey Provencal
- Rili
- Winta

== Synopsis ==
The documentary examines the historical 1830 proclamation issued by Governor George Arthur in Van Diemen's Land (now Tasmania), which placed a financial bounty on the capture and killing of Indigenous Tasmanian people. Through the reading of archival records and personal reflections, descendants of the Aboriginal survivors confront the legacy of the Black War and government-sanctioned violence.

== Production ==
Directed by George Kurwangun, the film focuses on historical accountability by placing First Nations people at the center of the narrative, allowing them to read and respond directly to colonial documents and historical proclamation posters.

== Reception ==
Bounty has been featured in several documentary and indigenous film festivals, receiving recognition for its direct approach to addressing colonial history in Australia.
