= The Grandmothers: Four Short Novels =

Novella series written by Doris Lessing

- First edition
- Author: Doris Lessing
- Language: English
- Publisher: Flamingo
- Publication date: 2003
- Publication place: United Kingdom
- Media type: Print (hardback & paperback)
- Pages: 311
- ISBN: 978-0-00-715279-7
- OCLC: 55588850
- Dewey Decimal: 823/.914 22
- LC Class: PR6023.E833 G69 2003b

The Grandmothers: Four Short Novels is collection of four novellas published in 2003 by 2007 Nobel laureate Doris Lessing.

The 2013 Australian-French film Adoration (alternatively known as Adore and Perfect Mothers) is based on the story The Grandmothers. The director Anne Fontaine said Lessing told her when they met that it was based on a true story that took place in a small community in Australia. In 2014, the story Victoria and the Staveneys was adapted into a French film by Jean-Paul Civeyrac called Mon amie Victoria.

== Plot summaries ==
=== The Grandmothers ===
At a beach café in Australia, the waitress is struck by the physical beauty and mutual affection of a group; two women, Roz and Lil, and their two sons, Tom and Ian, and two little girls who are the sons' children. Tom's wife Mary appears in great distress and, seizing both children, says she is taking them away forever. Hannah, Ian's wife, joins her and the four leave.

The story then flashes back to the childhood of Roz and Lil, inseparable friends through school and university, who had a double wedding, settled with their husbands in adjoining houses at a seaside resort and each had one son. When Roz's husband took a job elsewhere, she did not follow him, preferring to stay by the beach with her best friend, Lil and their two beautiful sons, who were as inseparable as their mothers. Then Lil's husband died in an accident, leaving her well-off. During the summer holidays when the fatherless boys were seventeen, they each became the lover of their mother's best friend.

Time passed and the boys were out in the world, meeting young women of their age. When Tom decided to marry Mary, therefore abandoning Lil, Roz decided to renounce Ian. Taking it badly, the young man tried to kill himself surfing, but survived and was tended by Mary's friend, Hannah. Another wedding followed, with both brides having baby daughters. Then, among Tom's things, Mary discovered old letters between him and Lil, and the story loops back to its opening.

=== Victoria and the Staveneys ===
In London, when the aunt she lives with is rushed to the hospital, nine-year-old Victoria is taken after school to the spacious home of a kind-hearted older boy Edward Staveney and his younger brother Thomas. She is poor and black, while their white family is well-off and liberal. As years pass, looking after her failing aunt, she fantasises over the luxury in which the Staveneys live. When her aunt dies, she is evicted from their little flat and taken into the crowded home of their social worker, who encourages her to exploit her developing good looks.

At age 19, working in a West End music shop, she is recognised by Thomas, who asks her back to the home she has always dreamed about. They have an affair and later Victoria finds out that she is pregnant. As a single mother she gets a flat of her own and, after going back to work, marries a black musician who moves in with her but, after giving her another baby they call Dickson, dies in a road crash.

Seeing Thomas in the street, Victoria rings him up to say he has a six-year-old daughter called Mary, so he asks her round. The Staveneys insist on a DNA test and when it is done, accept the sweet caramel-coloured Mary with joy, ignoring the difficult black Dickson who is no kin. They take Mary for a month's holiday in a cottage in Dorset, where Victoria joins them for a week but is intimidated by their lifestyle and hates the country. Later, they propose sending Mary to a good school, an idea with which Victoria wrestles. In the end she accepts that Mary will be brought up as a Staveney and lost to her, while she could always marry another black man and have more children.

=== The Reason for It ===
In an extant paper, a member of The Twelve, an oligarchy, tells of the history of his civilisation. Subsequent to Destra's death, her son DeRod takes up her role after The Twelve pick him. The civilisation is slowly destroyed; after much reflection, the narrator realises DeRod cannot be blamed for it: he was an idiot and did not know what he was doing.

=== A Love Child ===
During the Second World War, James, a British young man, is dispatched to South Africa and India. In SA, he has an affair with a British girl who lives there, Daphne. She becomes pregnant and he never forgets her. Both of them get married, and when the child is twenty he flies to SA and attempts to meet him. He only receives a picture; his life goes on but his marriage seems a sham.
