= My Friend Victoria =

- Directed by: Jean-Paul Civeyrac
- Written by: Jean-Paul Civeyrac
- Based on: Victoria and the Staveneys from Doris Lessing's The Grandmothers
- Produced by: Philippe Martin; Jacques-Henri Bronckart; Olivier Bronckart
- Starring: Guslagie Malanda; Nadia Moussa; Catherine Mouchet; Pascal Greggory
- Edited by: Louise Narboni
- Release dates: 9 October 2014 (Festival du Film Francophone de Namur); 31 December 2014
- Running time: 95 minutes
- Countries: France; Belgium
- Language: French

My Friend Victoria (French: Mon amie Victoria) is a French/Belgian film, directed by Jean-Paul Civeyrac, released in December 2014. It stars Guslagie Malanda, Nadia Moussa, Catherine Mouchet, Pascal Greggory and Pierre Andrau.

Civeyrac adapted the film from Victoria and the Staveneys, a story by Doris Lessing.

== Plot ==
Victoria, a black girl from a modest background, has never forgotten the night she spent at the house of a bourgeois family in Paris, at the home of Thomas, a school-friend who had once brought her back with him. Years later, their paths re-cross. From a brief liaison, a daughter, Marie, is born. But Victoria leaves it another seven years before revealing the child's existence to Thomas and his family. They suggest she bring the child regularly to their home. Bit by bit, Victoria measures the consequences of this.

== Development ==
Doris Lessing's Victoria and the Staveneys was first published in her collection The Grandmothers (2003). Writer and director Jean-Paul Civeyrac changed the setting of Lessing's story from London to Paris.

Guslagie Malanda had no film experience before she was cast in the title role; she went to an audition after a friend working on the project told her that she "might be a good fit".

== Reception ==
On review aggregator Rotten Tomatoes, the film holds an approval rating of 60% based on 5 reviews, with an average rating of 5/10. A reviewer for The Hollywood Reporter called it "a touching if not quite gripping portrait of race and family – this well-acted and intimate affair lacks the narrative drive to push it far beyond French borders, but it's worth a look". A Slant Magazine critic found the film's treatment of racism to be sincere but shallow.
