= Florida Film Critics Circle =

Organization of film reviewers

The Florida Film Critics Circle (FFCC) is a film critic organization founded in 1996. The FFCC comprises 30 film critics from Florida-based print and online publications. At the end of each year, the FFCC members vote on the Florida Film Critics Circle Awards for incredible achievements in films released that year. The organization also awards the Pauline Kael Breakout Award, named after film critic Pauline Kael, and the Golden Orange Award for Outstanding Contribution to Film. The FFCC membership includes film critics from Miami Herald, Miami New Times, Sun-Sentinel, Folio Weekly, Bloody Disgusting, WJNO Radio, WTVT, The Daytona Beach News-Journal, FlickDirect, and Tampa Bay Times.

== Awards ==
=== Categories ===
- Best Actor
- Best Actress
- Best Supporting Actor
- Best Supporting Actress
- Best Animated Film
- Best Art Direction and Production Design
- Best Cast (or Best Ensemble Acting) (1997, 1999–2003, 2014-)
- Best Cinematography
- Best Director
- Best Documentary Film
- Best Film
- Best Foreign Language Film
- Best Score
- Best Screenplay
- Best Song (1996)
- Best Visual Effects

The group also presents the Pauline Kael Breakout Award, named after film critic Pauline Kael, to the most impressive newcomer, and the Golden Orange Award for contributions to Florida filmmaking.

=== Award breakdown ===
- 6 awards:
  - One Battle After Another (2025): Best Picture, Best Director, Best Supporting Actor, Best Supporting Actress, Best Adapted Screenplay, Best Editing, and the Pauline Kael Breakout Award
- 5 awards:
  - The Power of the Dog (2021): Best Picture, Best Director, Best Supporting Actor, Best Adapted Screenplay, and Best Cinematography
  - 12 Years a Slave (2013): Best Picture, Best Director, Best Actor, Best Supporting Actress, and Best Adapted Screenplay
- 4 awards:
  - Decision to Leave (2022): Best Director, Best Original Screenplay, Best Cinematography, and Best International Film
  - Mad Max: Fury Road (2016): Best Picture, Best Director, Best Cinematography, and Best Visual Effects
  - Inception (2010): Best Original Screenplay, Best Cinematography, Best Production Design/Art Direction, and Best Visual Effects
  - No Country for Old Men (2007): Best Picture, Director, Supporting Actor, and Cinematography
  - The Departed (2006): Best Picture, Director, Supporting Actor, and Screenplay
  - Brokeback Mountain (2005): Best Picture, Director, Screenplay, and Cinematography
  - Sideways (2004): Best Picture, Supporting Actor, Director, and Screenplay
  - Adaptation. (2002): Best Picture, Supporting Actor, Supporting Actress, and Screenplay
  - Fargo (1996): Best Picture, Actress, Director, and Screenplay
- 3 awards:
  - The Beast (2024): Best Picture, Best Director, and Best Actress
  - The Boy and the Heron (2023): Best Picture, Best Animated Film, and Best Score
  - Killers of the Flower Moon (2023): Best Actress, Best Ensemble, and Breakout Award
  - Everything Everywhere All at Once (2022): Best Picture, Best Supporting Actor, and Best Ensemble
  - Dune (2021): Best Visual Effects, Best Art Direction/Production, and Best Score
  - Marriage Story (2019): Best Actor, Best Actress, and Best Supporting Actress
  - Portrait of a Lady on Fire (2019): Best Picture, Best Director, and Best Foreign Language Film
  - The Grand Budapest Hotel (2014): Best Ensemble, Original Screenplay, and Art Direction/Production Design
  - Argo (2012): Best Picture, Best Director, and Best Adapted Screenplay
  - The Descendants (2011): Best Picture, Supporting Actress, and Adapted Screenplay
  - The Social Network (2010): Best Picture, Best Director, and Best Adapted Screenplay
  - Up in the Air (2009): Best Picture, Director, and Actor
  - Slumdog Millionaire (2008): Best Picture, Best Director, and Screenplay
  - The Lord of the Rings: The Return of the King (2003): Best Picture, Director, and Cinematography
  - Traffic (2000): Best Picture, Supporting Actor, and Director
  - Shakespeare in Love (1998): Best Picture, Actress, and Screenplay
  - L.A. Confidential (1997): Best Director, Screenplay, and Cinematography
- 2 awards:
  - No Other Choice (2025): Best Director and Best International Film
  - Resurrection (2025): Best Art Direction / Production Design and Best Cinematography
  - Dune: Part Two (2024): Best Art Direction/Production Design and Best Visual Effects
  - May December (2023): Best Director and Best Supporting Actor
  - Past Lives (2023): Best Original Screenplay and Best First Film
  - Babylon (2022): Best Art Direction/Production Design and Best Score
  - Tár (2022): Best Actress and Best Supporting Actress
  - Women Talking (2022): Best Supporting Actress and Best Adapted Screenplay
  - Licorice Pizza (2021): Best Actress and Breakout Award
  - Mank (2020): Best Art Direction/Production Design and Cinematography
  - Nomadland (2020): Best Director and Actress
  - Soul (2020): Best Animated Film and Score
  - Uncut Gems (2019): Best Original Screenplay and Score
  - Birdman (2014): Best Picture and Actor
  - Boyhood (2014): Best Actor and Supporting Actress
  - Gone Girl (2014): Best Actress and Adapted Screenplay
  - Interstellar (2014): Best Cinematography and Visual Effects
  - 21 Grams (2003): Best Actor and Actress
  - Mystic River (2003): Best Actor and Supporting Actor
  - Far From Heaven (2002): Best Actress and Cinematography
  - Gangs of New York (2002): Best Actor and Director
  - Amélie (2001): Best Picture and Foreign-Language Film
  - Crouching Tiger, Hidden Dragon (2000): Best Cinematography and Foreign-Language Film
  - State and Main (2000): Best Screenplay and Ensemble Acting
  - American Beauty (1999): Best Actor and Director
  - Magnolia (1999): Best Picture and Ensemble Acting
  - Titanic (1997): Best Film and Cinematography
  - The People vs. Larry Flynt (1996): Best Supporting Actor and Actress

== See also ==
- List of film awards
- Florida Film Festival
- Film industry in Florida
