= Guslagie Malanda =

French actress (born 1990)

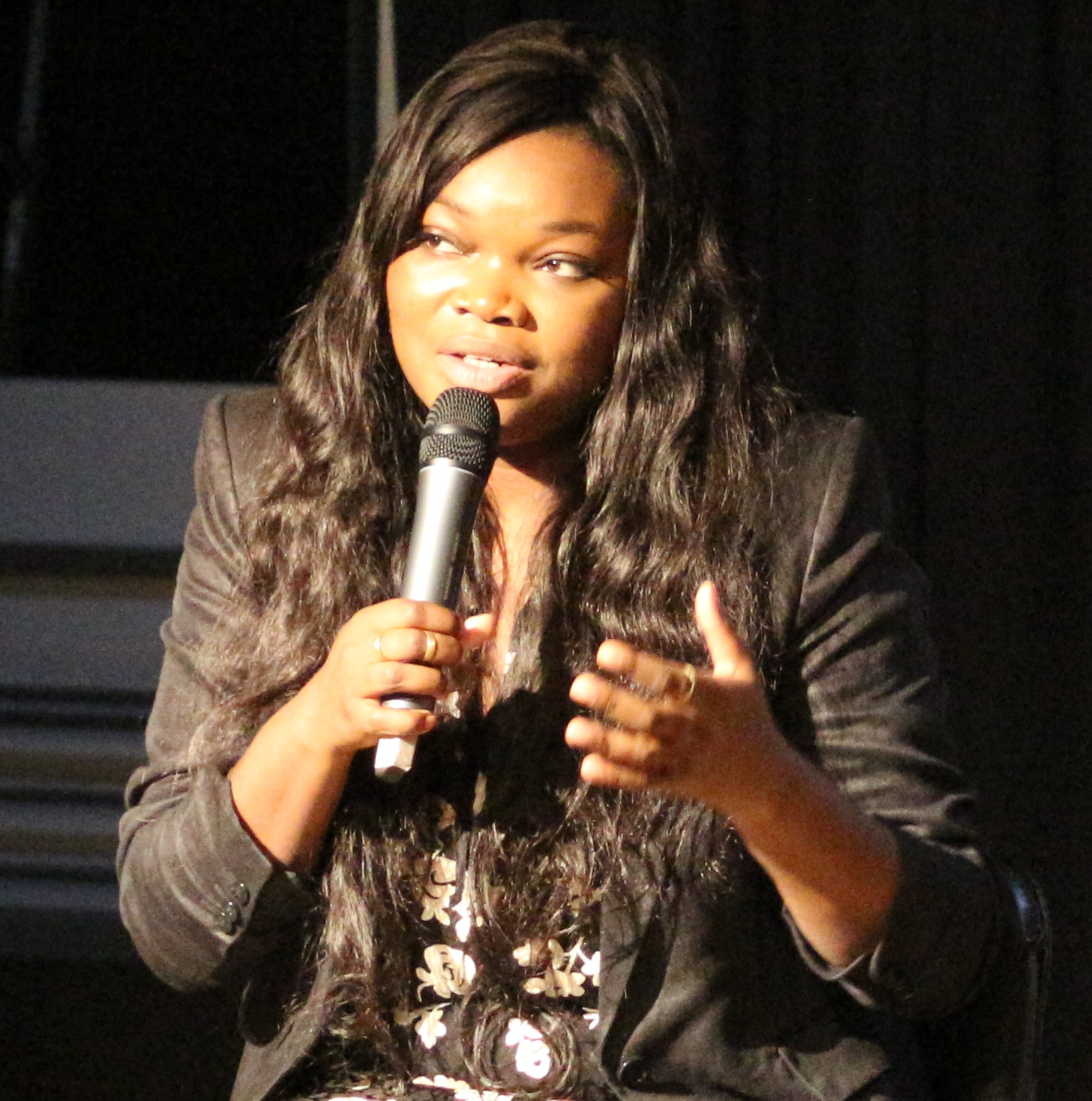
- Malanda in 2023
- Born: 1990 (age 35–36)
- Occupations: Actress; curator
- Years active: 2014–present
- Known for: My Friend Victoria; Saint Omer

Guslagie Malanda (born 1990) is a French actress and art curator. She has starred in the films My Friend Victoria (2014) and Saint Omer (2022).

== Life and career ==
Raised in France, Malanda had an interest in theater and cinema from a young age. She studied art history in college and has worked in art curation since graduation.

Malanda made her screen debut in 2014, playing the title role of Jean-Paul Civeyrac's My Friend Victoria. She got the part after a friend working on the film recommended that she audition. Her acting was well-received; a New York Times review noted her "pensive performance" as Victoria, a young mother who gets back in contact with the family that once took her in. However, after My Friend Victoria, Malanda went many years without acting professionally; as a Black Frenchwoman, she refused to accept roles she considered stereotypical (criminals, immigrants, terrorists, etc.), which comprised almost all the parts she was offered. During this time, while working as an art curator, Malanda considered herself "an actress in secret". In 2018, she took a minor role on an episode of the US television series The Romanoffs.

Director Alice Diop, a friend of Malanda's, encouraged her to return to film by offering to cast her in Saint Omer (2022). Based on the real-life Fabienne Kabou case, the film stars Malanda as Laurence Coly, a Senegalese immigrant on trial for killing her one-year-old daughter. Malanda studied tai chi to prepare for the challenge of controlling her breath on the courtroom stand. Shooting the film was intense, with Malanda delivering very long monologues and spending a lot of time in character; she described experiencing nightmares for a year. Malanda's acting was again well-regarded; Mario Naves of The New York Sun praised her "remarkable performance" for its "stately proportions, subtlety, and grit", and A. O. Scott of The New York Times said she gave her character "the tragic, piercing dignity of a Racine heroine". At the 48th César Awards, she was nominated for the César Award for Most Promising Actress for Saint Omer.

Malanda appeared in Bertrand Bonello's The Beast (2023).

== Filmography ==
=== Film ===
Year	Title	Role
2014	My Friend Victoria	Victoria
2022	Saint Omer	Laurence Coly
2023	The Beast	Poupée Kelly
2025	Dossier 137	Alicia Mady
2026	A Girl's Story	Rose

=== Television ===
Year	Title	Role	Notes
2018	The Romanoffs	Clotilde	1 episode
