= Fabienne Kabou =

Senegalese-French convicted murderer

- Born: 14 June 1977 (age 49); Dakar, Senegal
- Children: 1 (deceased)
- Status: Convicted
- Criminal charges: Premeditated murder
- Penalty: 20 years in prison

Fabienne Kabou (born 14 June 1977) is a Senegalese–French woman who was convicted of the murder of her 15-month-old daughter, Adélaïde, on 19 November 2013.

She had given birth in secret and raised the child alone in Paris. Apparently mentally ill, Kabou traveled to Berck with the intention of drowning the child and left her on a beach at night. The girl was found dead the next day. Kabou was quickly arrested. She was convicted of murder and sentenced to 20 years in prison after a trial in June 2016.

The trial inspired the feature film Saint Omer (2022), written and directed by Alice Diop.

== Events ==
Fabienne Kabou was born into a wealthy Senegalese Catholic family in Dakar on 14 June 1977. Her father worked as a translator for the United Nations, her mother as a secretary. Kabou was a good student and reportedly scored 130 on IQ tests.

In 1995, she moved to France to study architecture. After two years, she changed to philosophy, and was writing a thesis on Wittgenstein.

She met a French sculptor 30 years her senior, named Michel Lafon, with whom she became romantically involved. She twice terminated pregnancies while they were together.

When Kabou became pregnant a third time, she hid the fact from Lafon. She gave birth to a girl alone in their studio in August 2012. She named the child Adélaïde ("Ada"), but did not legally register her. She told no one outside the household about the infant, not even her mother in Senegal. Kabou named the girl after her own grandmother.

Kabou retreated from her academic and social life to raise Adélaïde. Lafon was apparently not interested in the child.

Having experienced hallucinations and other mental conditions for years, Kabou spent €40,000 euros seeking help from "witchdoctors and healers" before the murder.

On 19 November 2013, Kabou took Adélaïde by train to the coastal town of Berck-sur-Mer, where she checked into a hotel room. She had told Lafon that she was taking the child to Senegal to live with her mother. After dusk she walked on the beach with Adélaïde in a stroller and breastfed her. Later she said she had felt an inexplicable urge to abandon the girl.

She recalled, "I put an end to her life because it was easier that way. It was as if I felt carried along, I just couldn't say stop." She laid her almost asleep daughter down in the tide, hugged her for some minutes while asking for forgiveness, and then ran from the beach. Fishermen discovered the child's drowned body on the shore the next morning. Kabou returned to Paris that day.

The authorities arrested Kabou in Paris a few days after the incident; closed-circuit television had captured her trip. Kabou readily admitted to having planned to drown Adélaïde.

== Trial and aftermath ==
Kabou was tried on charges of premeditated murder, beginning in Saint-Omer on 20 June 2016. A possible sentence if she were found guilty was life imprisonment. Psychiatrists determined that Kabou was fit to stand trial despite suffering from "paranoid delirium". Kabou claimed that "evil forces" and "witchcraft" had tormented her and drove her to commit the act. A psychologist said that Senegalese traditions of witchcraft had "radically altered her view of the world", though the prosecution argued that this explanation was just a defense strategy. The court psychiatrist suggested that postpartum depression had affected her mental state. On 24 June 2016, Kabou was sentenced to 20 years in prison and ordered to receive psychological treatment.

Documentary filmmaker Alice Diop, who attended the trial, was inspired to write and direct a feature film based on the case. The film, Saint Omer, premiered in 2022 at the Venice International Film Festival to positive reviews. It received an award for best debut film, and also the Silver Lion Jury Award. Guslagie Malanda, who played the role based on Kabou, found being in character so taxing that she had nightmares for a year afterward. Diop fainted on set when the shooting wrapped.
