= Alice Diop =

French filmmaker (born 1979)

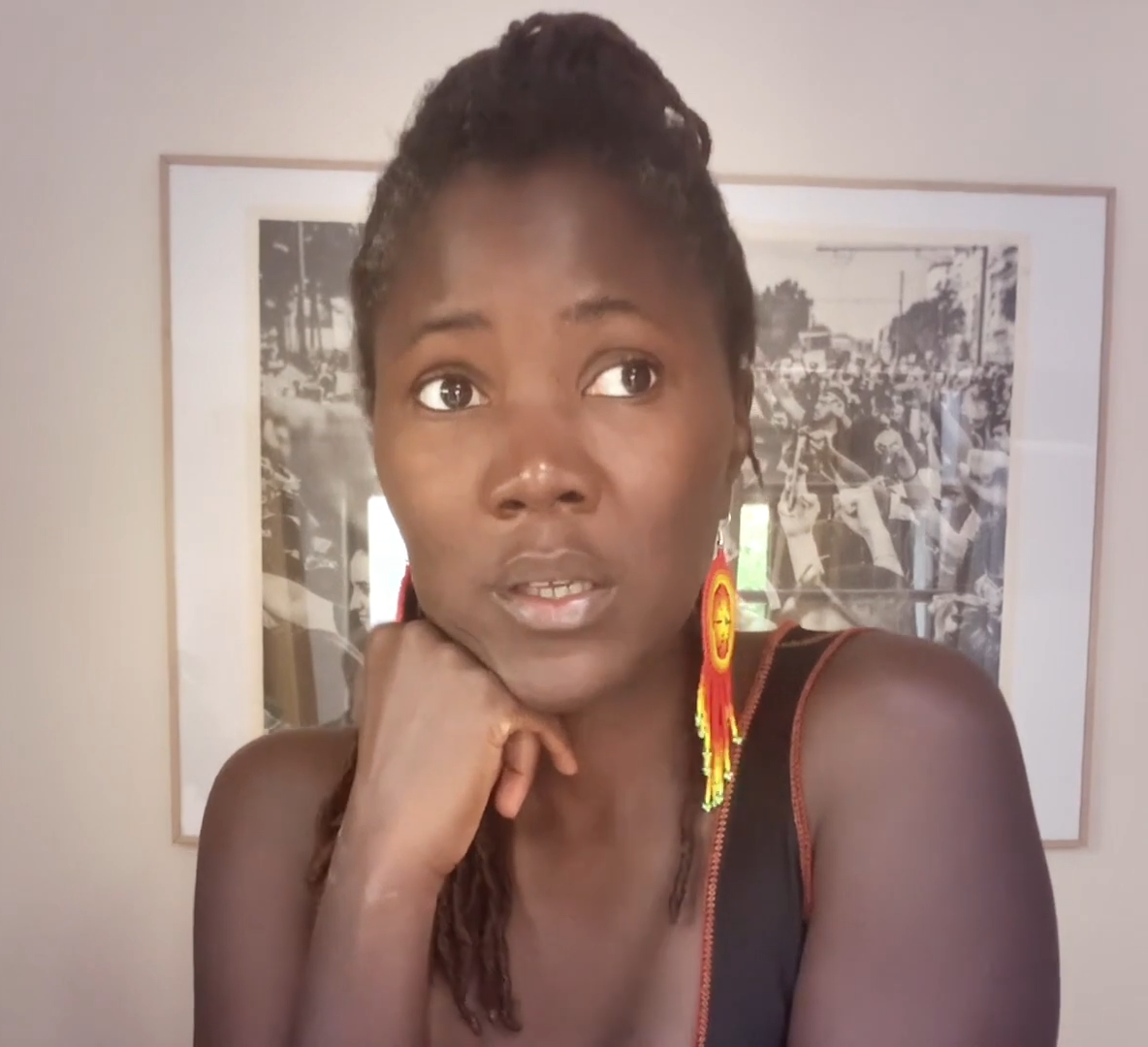
- Diop in 2022
- Born: 1979 (age 46–47); Aulnay-sous-Bois, Paris, France
- Occupations: Director; screenwriter
- Years active: 2005–present

Alice Diop (French: [alis djɔp]; born 1979) is a French filmmaker. Her films include documentaries about contemporary French society and the feature drama film Saint Omer (2022).

== Early life and education ==
Diop was born in 1979 in the northern Parisian commune of Aulnay-sous-Bois. Her mother and father, who emigrated from Senegal in the 1960s, worked as a cleaner and an industrial painter, respectively. The family had five children and lived until Diop was ten in the commune's Cité des 3000 housing project. After her early schooling, she studied African colonial history at the Sorbonne, visual sociology at the University of Évry, and documentary filmmaking at La Fémis (workshop).

== Career ==
=== As a director ===
Diop's first films have been described as "earnest, slightly didactic portraits of marginalized populations". Fifteen years after leaving Aulnay-sous-Bois, she returned to film the cultural diversity of the area she grew up in for her first documentary, La Tour du monde (2005). In 2011, her documentary La Mort de Danton followed an aspiring actor from Aulnay.

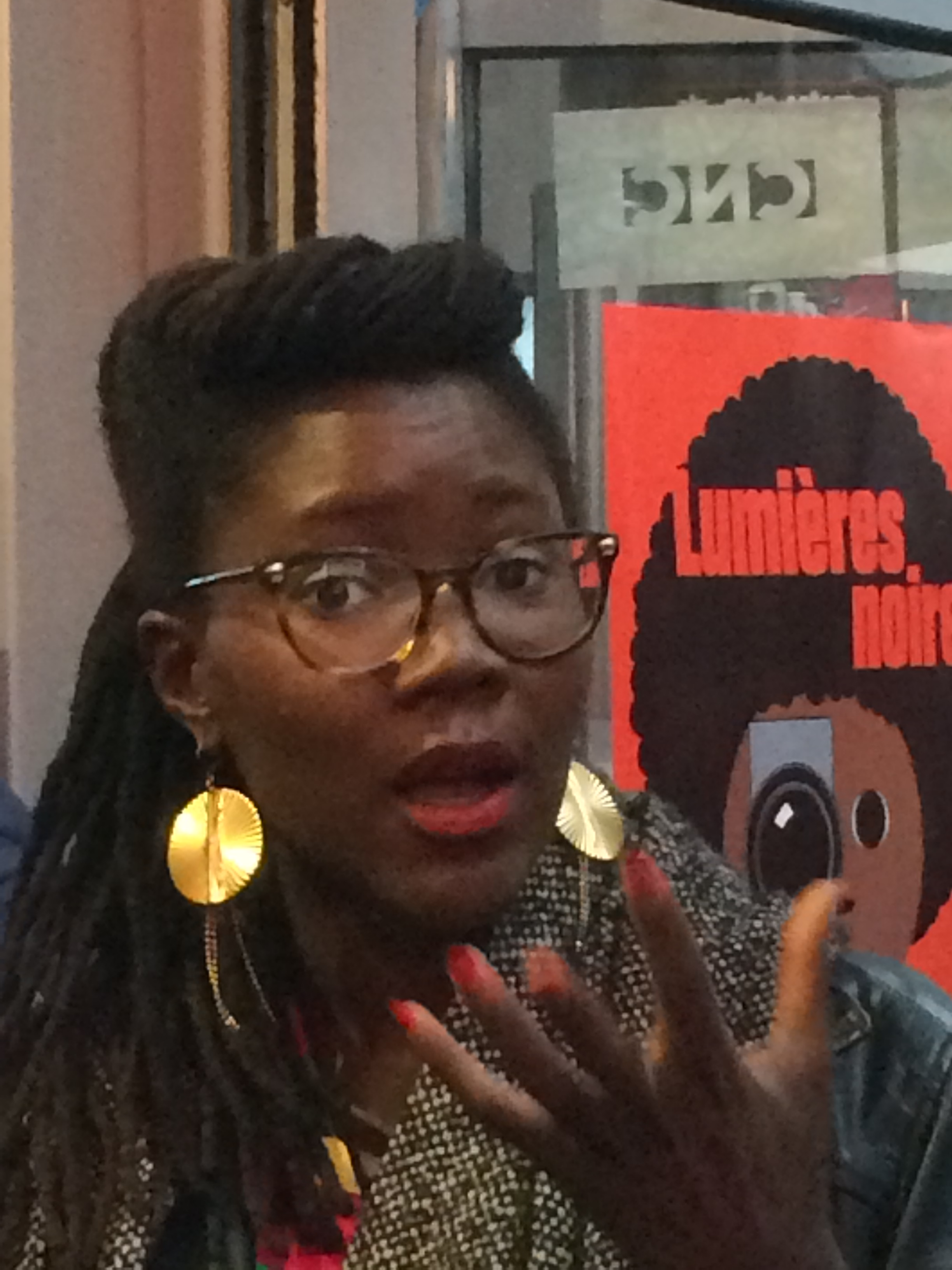
Diop in 2017

In 2016, Diop released two films. The first, La Permanence (English title: "On Call"), takes place in a medical center for refugees in Paris. The second documentary that year, Vers la tendresse ("Towards Tenderness"), features interviews with four young men talking about masculinity and the difficulty of finding love and intimacy.

Diop's next documentary, Nous ("We"), came out in 2020. Centering on suburban life along the RER B rail line outside Paris, it marked a broadening of Diop's subject to a wider breadth of French society. Selecting it as a Critic's Pick, The New York Times wrote that the film "points to the impossibility of portraiture itself, whether of a life, a people or a nation".

Saint Omer, Diop's first feature film, premiered in 2022 at the 79th Venice International Film Festival, where it won the Grand Jury Prize and the Luigi De Laurentiis Award for a debut film. The film was inspired by the trial (which Diop attended) of Fabienne Kabou, a Senegalese immigrant who abandoned her one-year-old daughter on a beach to die. Fascinated by the high-profile case, Diop recalled deciding to make a film about it during the trial's closing arguments, when she and others in the courtroom were visibly moved.

The script, co-written with Amrita David and Marie NDiaye, significantly borrows from court transcripts but tells the story through the lens of a courtroom observer (played by Kayije Kagame) analogous to Diop. Saint Omer was highly acclaimed; director Céline Sciamma described it as a "cinema poem" akin to Jeanne Dielman, 23 quai du Commerce, 1080 Bruxelles (1975). A. O. Scott of The New York Times, naming the film a Critic's Pick, called it an "intellectually charged, emotionally wrenching story about the inability of storytelling—literary, legal or cinematic—to do justice to the violence and strangeness of human experience". In 2023, a panel at Slate named Saint Omer one of the 75 best movies by black directors.

In 2025, Diop contributed a short film, Fragments for Venus, to the Miu Miu Women's Tales series.

=== Exhibitions ===
Diop's first exhibition, "Geste de Consolation", opened at the Palais d’Iéna in Paris for 5 days in October 2026. It was another collaboration between Diop and Miu Miu, in partnership with Art Basel Paris.

== Activism ==
In June 2024, Diop signed a petition addressed to French President Emmanuel Macron demanding France to officially recognize the State of Palestine.

== Filmography ==
- La Tour du monde (2005) – documentary
- Clichy pour l'exemple (2005) – documentary
- Les Sénégalaises et la sénégauloise (2007) – documentary
- La Mort de Danton (2011) – documentary
- La Permanence (2016) – documentary
- Vers la tendresse (2016) – documentary
- Nous (2020) – documentary
- Saint Omer (2022) – feature film
- Fragments for Venus (2025) - short film

== Awards ==
- La Mort de Danton (2011)
  - Prix des Bibliothèques – Cinéma du Réel (2011)
  - Grand Prix – 7th Festival International Film d'Education (2011)
  - Les Étoiles – SCAM (2012)
- La Permanence (2016)
  - Marcorelles French Institute Award – Cinéma du Réel (2016)
- Vers la tendresse (2016)
  - Grand Prix France – Festival du Cinéma de Brive (2016)
  - Prix du public – FIFF (2016)
  - Best Short Film – 42nd César Awards (2017)
- Nous (2020)
  - Documentary Award and Best Film – Berlinale (2021)
- Saint Omer (2022)
  - Silver Lion Grand Jury Prize and Lion of the Future Award – 79th Venice International Film Festival (2022)
  - César Award for Best First Film.
  - Variety and Golden Globe's Breakthrough Artist Awards – Breakthrough Director award (2023) for serving as chair of the international jury for the Luigi De Laurentiis Lion of the Future Award after winning the award for Saint Omer.
  - Grand Prix – Film Fest Gent 2022
