= Florida Film Critics Circle Award for Best Actress =

Annual US film award

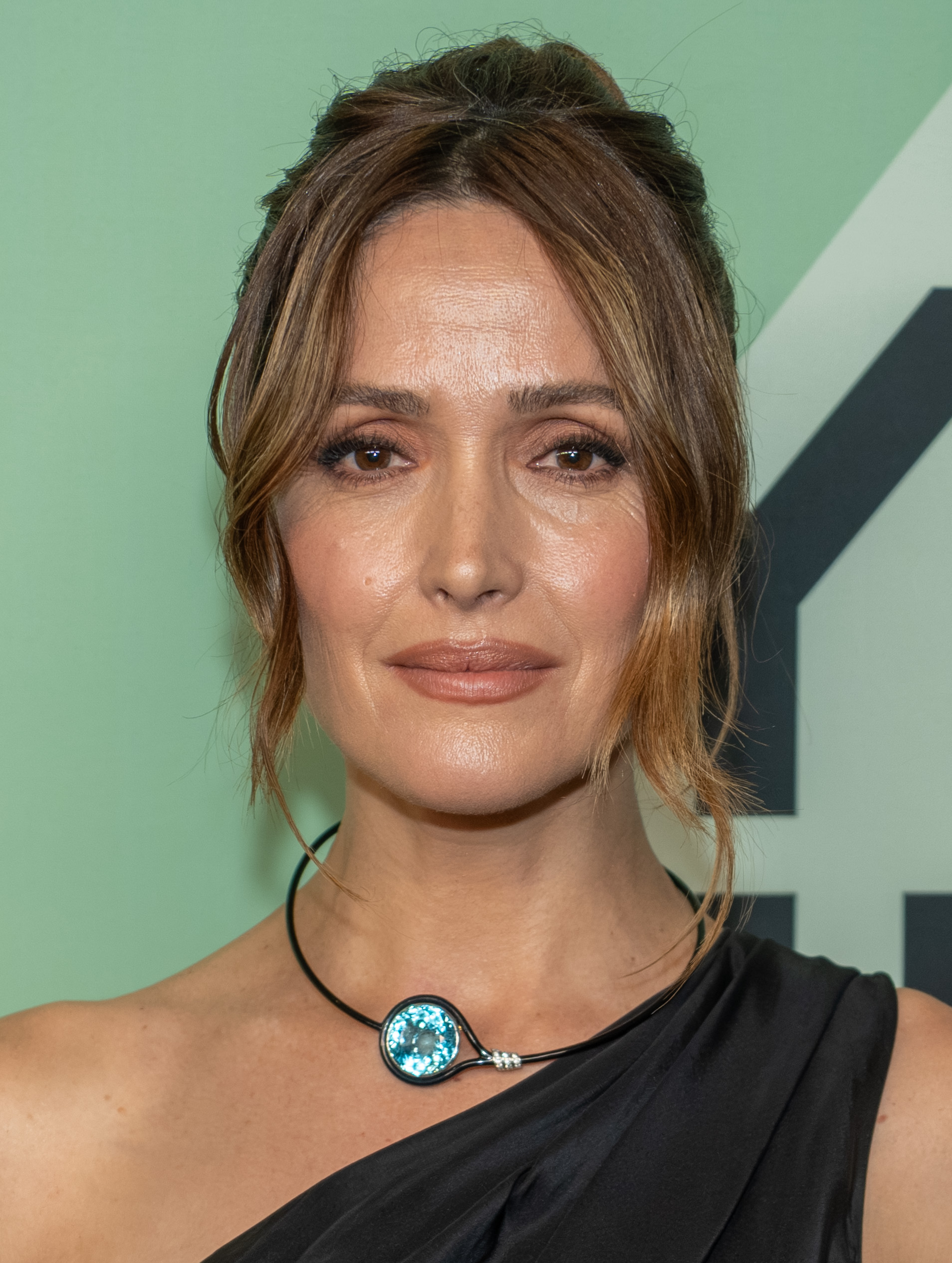
- The 2025 recipient: Rose Byrne
- Awarded for: Best Performance by an Actress in a Leading Role
- Country: United States
- Presented by: Florida Film Critics Circle
- First award: Frances McDormand; Fargo (1996)
- Currently held by: Rose Byrne; If I Had Legs I'd Kick You (2025)
- Website: floridafilmcritics.com

The Florida Film Critics Circle Award for Best Actress is an award given by the Florida Film Critics Circle to honor the finest female lead acting achievements in filmmaking.

== Winners ==
- * = Winner of the Academy Award for Best Actress

=== 1990s ===
Year	Winner	Film	Role	Ref.
1996	Frances McDormand *	Fargo	Marge Gunderson	
1997	Helen Hunt *	As Good as It Gets	Carol Connelly	
1998	Gwyneth Paltrow *	Shakespeare in Love	Viola de Lesseps	
1998	Gwyneth Paltrow *	Sliding Doors	Helen Quilley	
1999	Hilary Swank *	Boys Don't Cry	Brandon Teena	

=== 2000s ===
Year	Nominee	Film	Role	Ref.
2000	Ellen Burstyn	Requiem for a Dream	Sara Goldfarb	
2001	Sissy Spacek	In the Bedroom	Ruth Fowler	
2002	Julianne Moore	Far from Heaven	Cathy Whitaker	
2003	Naomi Watts	21 Grams	Cristina Peck	
2004	Hilary Swank *	Million Dollar Baby	Margaret "Maggie" Fitzgerald	
2005	Reese Witherspoon *	Walk the Line	June Carter Cash	
2006	Helen Mirren *	The Queen	Queen Elizabeth II	
2007	Elliot Page	Juno	Juno MacGuff	
2008	Melissa Leo	Frozen River	Ray Eddy	
2009	Gabourey Sidibe	Precious	Claireece "Precious" Jones	

=== 2010s ===
Year	Nominee	Film	Role	Ref.
2010	Natalie Portman *	Black Swan	Nina Sayers	
2011	Michelle Williams	My Week with Marilyn	Marilyn Monroe	
2012	Jessica Chastain	Zero Dark Thirty	Maya	
2013	Cate Blanchett *	Blue Jasmine	Jeannette "Jasmine" Francis	
2014	Rosamund Pike	Gone Girl	Amy Elliott Dunne	
2015	Brie Larson *	Room	Joy "Ma" Newsome	
2016	Isabelle Huppert	Elle	Michèle Leblanc	
2017	Margot Robbie	I, Tonya	Tonya Harding	
2018	Melissa McCarthy	Can You Ever Forgive Me?	Lee Israel	
2019	Scarlett Johansson	Marriage Story	Nicole Barber	

=== 2020s ===
Year	Nominee	Film	Role	Ref.
2020	Frances McDormand *	Nomadland	Fern	
2021	Alana Haim	Licorice Pizza	Alana Kane	
2022	Cate Blanchett	TÁR	Lydia Tár	
2023	Lily Gladstone	Killers of the Flower Moon	Mollie Kyle	
2024	Léa Seydoux	The Beast	Gabrielle	
2024	Rose Byrne	If I Had Legs I'd Kick You	Linda	

== Superlatives ==
Cate Blanchett, Frances McDormand and Hilary Swank are the only three actresses who had won this award multiple times.
