= Florida Film Critics Circle Award for Best Cast =

Annual US film award

The Florida Film Critics Circle Award for Best Ensemble Acting is an award given by the Florida Film Critics Circle (1997, 1999–2003, 2014-) to honor the finest achievements in film-making.

== Winners ==
- 1997: Boogie Nights
- 1999: Magnolia
- 2000: State and Main
- 2001: Gosford Park
- 2002: Thirteen Conversations About One Thing
- 2003: A Mighty Wind
- 2014: The Grand Budapest Hotel
- 2015: Spotlight
- 2016: American Honey
- 2017: Three Billboards Outside Ebbing, Missouri
- 2018: The Favourite
- 2019: Little Women
- 2020: Mangrove
- 2021: Mass
- 2022: Everything Everywhere All at Once
- 2023: Killers of the Flower Moon
- 2024: Conclave
- 2025: Sinners
