= Florida Film Critics Circle Award for Best Film =

Film award

The Florida Film Critics Circle Award for Best Picture is an award given by the Florida Film Critics Circle (FFCC) to honor the finest achievements in filmmaking. The FFCC is an organization of film critics and writers from Florida-based print and online publications. Founded in 1996, the FFCC strives to recognize outstanding work in film, further the cause of good movies, and maintain the highest level of professionalism among film critics in Florida.

== Winners ==
- † = Winner of the Academy Award for Best Picture

=== 1990s ===
Year	Winner	Director
1996	Fargo	Joel Coen
1997	Titanic †	James Cameron
1998	Shakespeare in Love †	John Madden
1999	Magnolia	Paul Thomas Anderson

=== 2000s ===
Year	Winner	Director(s)
2000	Traffic	Steven Soderbergh
2001	Amélie (Le fabuleux destin d'Amélie Poulain)	Jean-Pierre Jeunet
2002	Adaptation.	Spike Jonze
2003	The Lord of the Rings: The Return of the King †	Peter Jackson
2004	Sideways	Alexander Payne
2005	Brokeback Mountain	Ang Lee
2006	The Departed †	Martin Scorsese
2007	No Country for Old Men †	Joel Coen and Ethan Coen
2008	Slumdog Millionaire †	Danny Boyle
2009	Up in the Air	Jason Reitman

=== 2010s ===
Year	Winner	Director
2010	The Social Network	David Fincher
2011	The Descendants	Alexander Payne
2012	Argo †	Ben Affleck
2013	12 Years a Slave †	Steve McQueen
2014	Birdman or (The Unexpected Virtue of Ignorance) †	Alejandro G. Iñárritu
2015	Mad Max: Fury Road	George Miller
2016	The Lobster	Yorgos Lanthimos
2017	Dunkirk	Christopher Nolan
2018	The Favourite	Yorgos Lanthimos
2019	Portrait of a Lady on Fire	Céline Sciamma

=== 2020s ===
Year	Winner	Director(s)
2020	First Cow	Kelly Reichardt
2021	The Power of the Dog	Jane Campion
2022	Everything Everywhere All at Once†	Daniel Kwan and Daniel Scheinert
2023	The Boy and the Heron	Hayao Miyazaki
2024	The Beast	Bertrand Bonello
2025	One Battle After Another	Paul Thomas Anderson
