= Florida Film Critics Circle Award for Best Director =

Annual US film award

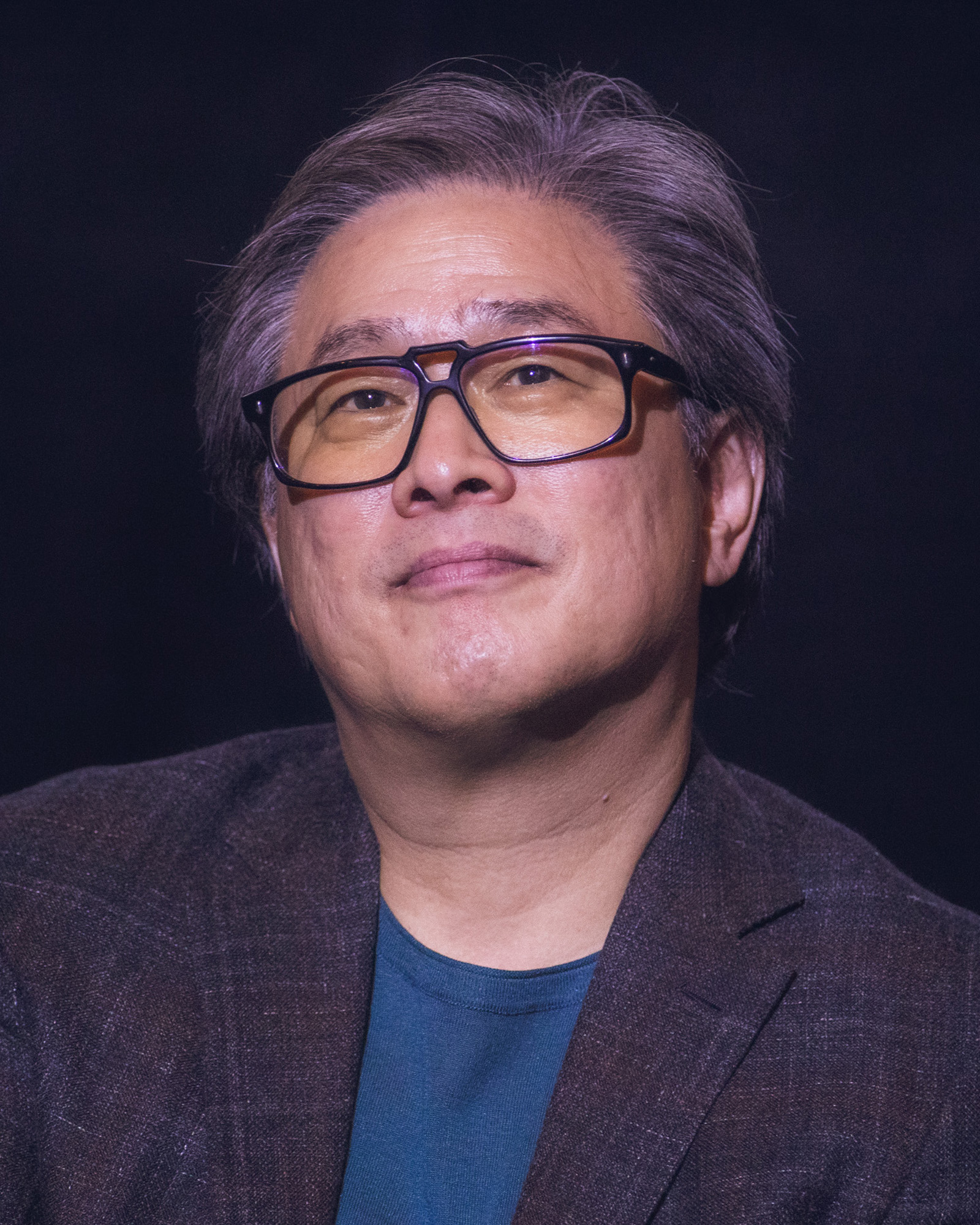
- The 2025 recipient: Park Chan-wook
- Awarded for: Best Direction
- Country: United States
- Presented by: Florida Film Critics Circle
- First award: Joel Coen; Fargo (1996)
- Currently held by: Park Chan-wook; No Other Choice (2025)
- Website: floridafilmcritics.com

The Florida Film Critics Circle Award for Best Director is an award given by the Florida Film Critics Circle to honor the finest directing achievements in filmmaking.

== Winners ==
- † = Winner of the Academy Award for Best Director

=== 1990s ===
Year	Winner	Film
1996	Joel Coen	Fargo
1997	Curtis Hanson	L.A. Confidential
1998	Peter Weir	The Truman Show
1999	Sam Mendes †	American Beauty

=== 2000s ===
Year	Winner	Film
2000	Steven Soderbergh	Erin Brockovich
2000	Steven Soderbergh	Traffic †
2001	Peter Jackson	The Lord of the Rings: The Fellowship of the Ring
2002	Martin Scorsese	Gangs of New York
2003	Peter Jackson †	The Lord of the Rings: The Return of the King
2004	Alexander Payne	Sideways
2005	Ang Lee †	Brokeback Mountain
2006	Martin Scorsese †	The Departed
2007	Joel Coen and Ethan Coen †	No Country for Old Men
2008	Danny Boyle †	Slumdog Millionaire
2009	Jason Reitman	Up in the Air

=== 2010s ===
Year	Winner	Film
2010	David Fincher	The Social Network
2011	Martin Scorsese	Hugo
2012	Ben Affleck	Argo
2013	Steve McQueen	12 Years a Slave
2014	Richard Linklater	Boyhood
2015	George Miller	Mad Max: Fury Road
2016	Damien Chazelle †	La La Land
2017	Christopher Nolan	Dunkirk
2018	Alfonso Cuarón †	Roma
2019	Céline Sciamma	Portrait of a Lady on Fire

=== 2020s ===
Year	Winner	Film
2020	Chloé Zhao†	Nomadland
2021	Jane Campion†	The Power of the Dog
2022	Park Chan-wook	Decision to Leave
2023	Todd Haynes	May December
2024	Bertrand Bonello	The Beast
2025	Park Chan-wook	No Other Choice
