= Florida Film Critics Circle Award for Best Screenplay =

Film award

The Florida Film Critics Circle Award for Best Screenplay is an award given by the Florida Film Critics Circle to honor the finest achievements in film-making. The award has been split into two categories, Best Adapted Screenplay and Best Original Screenplay, since 2010.

== Winners ==
=== 1990s ===
Year	Winner	Writer(s)	Source
1996	Fargo	Joel Coen and Ethan Coen	
1997	L.A. Confidential	Curtis Hanson and Brian Helgeland	novel by James Ellroy
1998	Shakespeare in Love	Marc Norman and Tom Stoppard	
1999	Election	Alexander Payne and Jim Taylor	novel by Tom Perrotta

=== 2000s ===
Year	Winner	Writer(s)	Source
2000	State and Main	David Mamet	
2001	Memento	Christopher Nolan	short story by Jonathan Nolan
2002	Adaptation.	Charlie and Donald Kaufman	book by Susan Orlean
2003	Lost in Translation	Sofia Coppola	
2004	Sideways	Alexander Payne and Jim Taylor	novel by Rex Pickett
2005	Brokeback Mountain	Larry McMurtry and Diana Ossana	short story by E. Annie Proulx
2006	The Departed	William Monahan	film by Andrew Lau and Alan Mak
2007	Juno	Diablo Cody	
2008	Slumdog Millionaire	Simon Beaufoy	novel by Vikas Swarup
2009	(500) Days of Summer	Scott Neustadter and Michael H. Weber	

=== 2010s ===
Year	Winner	Writer(s)	Source
2010	The Social Network (Adapted)	Aaron Sorkin	novel by Ben Mezrich
2010	Inception (Original)	Christopher Nolan	
2011	The Descendants (Adapted)	Alexander Payne, Nat Faxon, and Jim Rash	novel by Kaui Hart Hemmings
2011	The Artist (Original)	Michel Hazanavicius	
2012	Argo (Adapted)	Chris Terrio	novel by Tony Mendez article by Joshuah Bearman
2012	Looper (Original)	Rian Johnson	
2013	12 Years a Slave (Adapted)	John Ridley	memoir by Solomon Northup
2013	Her (Original)	Spike Jonze	
2014	Gone Girl (Adapted)	Gillian Flynn	novel by Gillian Flynn
2014	The Grand Budapest Hotel (Original)	Wes Anderson and Hugo Guinness	
2015	The Big Short (Adapted)	Adam McKay and Charles Randolph	book by Michael Lewis
2015	Spotlight (Original)	Tom McCarthy and Josh Singer	
2016	Love & Friendship (Adapted)	Whit Stillman	novel by Jane Austen
2016	The Lobster (Original)	Efthymis Filippou and Yorgos Lanthimos	
2017	Call Me by Your Name (Adapted)	James Ivory	novel by André Aciman
2017	Get Out (Original)	Jordan Peele	
2018	Can You Ever Forgive Me? (Adapted)	Nicole Holofcener and Jeff Whitty	memoir by Lee Israel
2018	Sorry to Bother You (Original)	Boots Riley	
2019	Little Women (Adapted)	Greta Gerwig	novel by Louisa May Alcott
2019	Uncut Gems (Original)	Ronald Bronstein and Benny and Josh Safdie	

=== 2020s ===
Year	Winner	Writer(s)	Source
2020	I'm Thinking of Ending Things (Adapted)	Charlie Kaufman	novel by Iain Reid
2020	Minari (Original)	Lee Isaac Chung	
2021	The Power of the Dog (Adapted)	Jane Campion	novel by Thomas Savage
2021	The French Dispatch (Original)	Wes Anderson, Roman Coppola, Hugo Guinness, and Jason Schwartzman	
2022	Women Talking (Adapted)	Sarah Polley	novel by Miriam Toews
2022	Decision to Leave (Original)	Park Chan-wook and Jeong Seo-Gyeong	
2023	Poor Things (Adapted)	Tony McNamara	novel by Alasdair Gray
2023	Past Lives (Original)	Celine Song	
2024	Queer (Adapted)	Justin Kuritzkes	novel by William S. Burroughs
2024	I Saw the TV Glow (Original)	Jane Schoenbrun	
2025	One Battle After Another (Adapted)	Paul Thomas Anderson	Vineland by Thomas Pynchon
2025	It Was Just an Accident (Original)	Jafar Panahi	
