= List of accolades received by Hundreds of Beavers =

Hundreds of Beavers is a 2022 American independent slapstick comedy film directed by Mike Cheslik in his feature directorial debut, and written by Cheslik and Ryland Tews. The black-and-white film stars Tews as applejack maker Jean Kayak who, in trying to win the hand of a merchant's daughter, finds himself embroiled in a conflict with beavers.

== Awards and nominations ==
Award	Date of ceremony	Category	Recipient(s)	Result	Ref.
Mórbido Fest	November 6, 2022	Bronze Skull Award	Hundreds of Beavers	Won	
Kansas International Film Festival	March 29, 2023	Best Narrative Feature	Hundreds of Beavers	Won	
Phoenix Film Festival	April 2, 2023	Best Director	Mike Cheslik	Won	
Capital City Film Festival	April 15, 2023	Best Narrative Feature	Hundreds of Beavers	Won	
Fantasia International Film Festival	August 9, 2023	Bronze Audience Award for Best International Feature	Hundreds of Beavers	Won	
Astra Midseason Movie Awards	July 3, 2024	Best Indie	Hundreds of Beavers	Nominated	
Astra Film Awards	December 8, 2024	Best Truly Indie Feature	Hundreds of Beavers	Nominated	
Chicago Film Critics Association	December 11, 2024	Best Use of Visual Effects	Hundreds of Beavers	Nominated	
Chicago Film Critics Association	December 11, 2024	Milos Stehlik Award for Breakthrough Filmmaker	Mike Cheslik	Nominated	
St. Louis Film Critics Association	December 15, 2024	Best Comedy Film	Hundreds of Beavers	Won	
St. Louis Film Critics Association	December 15, 2024	Best Costume Design	Casey Harris	Nominated	
Indiana Film Journalists Association	December 16, 2024	Best Special Effects	Mike Cheslik (visual effects) and Jerry Kurek (assistant effects artist)	Runner-up	
Indiana Film Journalists Association	December 16, 2024	Original Vision	Hundreds of Beavers	Won	
Indiana Film Journalists Association	December 16, 2024	Breakout of the Year	Mike Cheslik (director / co-writer / editor / visual effects)	Nominated	
New York Film Critics Online	December 16, 2024	Best Debut Director	Mike Cheslik	Nominated	
Florida Film Critics Circle	December 20, 2024	Best Picture	Hundreds of Beavers	Nominated	
Florida Film Critics Circle	December 20, 2024	Best First Feature	Hundreds of Beavers	Won	
Florida Film Critics Circle	December 20, 2024	Best Visual Effects	Hundreds of Beavers	Nominated	
Florida Film Critics Circle	December 20, 2024	Breakout Performance	Ryland Tews	Nominated	
Alliance of Women Film Journalists	January 7, 2025	Best Animated Film	Hundreds of Beavers	Nominated	
International Cinephile Society	February 9, 2025	Best Breakthrough Performance	Ryland Tews	Nominated	
Dorian Awards	February 13, 2025	Campiest Flick	Hundreds of Beavers	Nominated	
Dorian Awards	February 13, 2025	Unsung Film of the Year	Hundreds of Beavers	Nominated	

== Works cited ==
=== News ===
- Anderson, Erik (December 12, 2024). "2024 Alliance of Women Film Journalists (AWFJ) Nominations". AwardsWatch. Archived from the original on January 10, 2025.
- Anderson, Erik (January 26, 2025). "22nd International Cinephile Society (ICS) Awards: 'All We Imagine as Light', 'The Brutalist', 'Nickel Boys' Lead Nominations". AwardsWatch. Archived from the original on January 30, 2025.
- Hazelton, John (July 31, 2023). "Raven Banner takes 'Hundreds Of Beavers' for international (exclusive)". Screen Daily. Archived from the original on May 17, 2024.
- Jevens, Darel (December 11, 2024). "'The Brutalist' called best of 2024 by Chicago Film Critics Association". Chicago Sun-Times. Archived from the original on May 25, 2025.
- Mack, Andrew (January 16, 2024). "'Hundreds of Beavers' Begins North American Theatrical Tour". ScreenAnarchy. Archived from the original on February 3, 2024.
- Pedersen, Erik (January 17, 2025). "Dorian Awards Nominations: 'I Saw The TV Glow' & 'The Substance' Lead Field". Deadline Hollywood. Archived from the original on May 25, 2025.
- Pond, Steve (November 25, 2024). "'Wicked' Leads Nominations for Astra Film Awards". TheWrap. Archived from the original on May 25, 2025.
- Rogers, Nick (December 16, 2024). "'The Substance' dominates Indiana critic awards". Midwest Film Journal. Archived from the original on May 25, 2025.
- Tallerico, Brian (December 10, 2024). ""The Brutalist" Leads Chicago Film Critics Association Nominees". RogerEbert.com. Archived from the original on May 25, 2025.

=== Web ===
- "Feature Film Awards". Phoenix Film Festival. Archived from the original on April 12, 2024.
- "'The Beast' Dominates FFCC Awards with three wins, 'Dune: Part Two' wins two". Florida Film Critics Circle. December 22, 2024. Archived from the original on May 25, 2025.
- Neglia, Matt (July 3, 2024). "The 2024 Hollywood Creative Alliance (HCA) Midseason Astra Award Winners". Next Best Picture. Archived from the original on July 30, 2024.
- Neglia, Matt (December 16, 2024). "The 2024 New York Film Critics Online (NYFCO) Winners". Next Best Picture. Archived from the original on December 20, 2024.
- Neglia, Matt (December 8, 2024). "The 2024 St. Louis Film Critics Association (StLFCA) Nominations". Next Best Picture. Archived from the original on December 10, 2024.
- Neglia, Matt (December 15, 2024). "The 2024 St. Louis Film Critics Association (StLFCA) Winners". Next Best Picture. Archived from the original on December 16, 2024.
