= Lake Michigan Monster =

- Official release poster by Jade Watring
- Directed by: Ryland Brickson Cole Tews
- Written by: Ryland Brickson Cole Tews
- Story by: Ryland Brickson Cole Tews; Mike Cheslik
- Produced by: Ryland Brickson Cole Tews; Mike Cheslik; Sebastian Johnson
- Starring: Ryland Brickson Cole Tews; Erick West; Beulah Peters; Daniel Long; Wayne Tews
- Cinematography: Sebastian Johnson
- Edited by: Mike Cheslik
- Music by: Chris Ryan
- Production company: Blood Sweat Honey
- Distributed by: Arrow Films
- Release date: October 24, 2018 (Milwaukee Film Festival)
- Running time: 78 minutes
- Country: United States
- Language: English
- Budget: $7,000 (estimated)

Lake Michigan Monster is a 2018 American comedy horror film written, produced and directed by Ryland Brickson Cole Tews. It stars Tews, Erick West, Beulah Peters, Daniel Long, and Wayne Tews, and centers on an eccentric alcoholic who assembles a team to track down and kill the titular monster to avenge the death of his father.

The independent film was developed by Tews and Mike Cheslik after a conversation speculating on what would happen if a monster washed up on the shores of Lake Michigan. It was shot in Milwaukee and Muskegon, Michigan over sixteen months. Its script was influenced by the British comedy group Monty Python, the earlier seasons of The Simpsons, and the films of Guy Maddin. The film was shot in black-and-white and its low-budget visual style was developed out of necessity as they could only afford low-resolution cameras.

Lake Michigan Monster premiered at the Milwaukee Film Festival on October 24, 2018, and was screened at various festivals during 2019, including the Beloit International Film Festival and Fantasia International Film Festival. The distribution company Arrow Films released it via their channel and video on demand on August 3, 2020. It won multiple awards and nominations, and was generally praised for its homage to 1960s B movie humor, as well as its use of practical and special effects.

== Plot ==
The main protagonist, Seafield, is an eccentric, alcoholic sea captain, who lost his father to a lake monster. He assembles a team of specialists consisting of weapons expert Sean Shaughnessy, sonar operator Nedge Pepsi, and former United States Navy officer Dick Flynn. They arrive at Lighthouse Island in Lake Michigan, intending to kill it. Their first two attempts fail, and the monster attacks Dick during the second but he survives.

They meet with Seafield's brother Ashcroft to brainstorm a new plan. One night they encounter the monster, who leaves them a note, saying it will see them in their dreams. While dreaming, Seafield witnesses Dick being sexually assaulted by the monster, and it later appears with an egg, which it calls a peace offering. In the morning, Seafield finds the egg and has Sean shoot it. During their third attempt, Dick throws the egg's pieces into the lake as bait after hearing voices calling out for the egg. The monster later kills Sean in a rage after finding the egg's remains.

During Sean's funeral, Dick is angered after discovering the monster's offspring was his unborn son and leaves the team. Back at base, Seafield tells Nedge the truth. He is neither a captain nor rich, as he previously claimed. Upset, Nedge leaves him. At night, Ashcroft tells Seafield that he is cursed; the only way to break the curse, he warns, is to kill the monster. Seafield attempts to reenlist Dick and Nedge, but they deny his offer. Seafield then encounters Sean's ghost, who pursues him to a boat headed for Lighthouse Island. During this time, Ashcroft is attacked and killed by the monster on Lighthouse Island.

Back on the boat, Seafield realizes the boat is heading backwards. He attempts to get it back on course, but the boat starts to malfunction. He fixes it and heads to Lighthouse Island. En route, he finds Ashcroft's severed head, who tells him the reason they didn't have a mother was because their father killed her. Arriving at the island, Seafield heads down into the catacombs and finds his father's ghost army. He asks them for help in killing the monster, which they accept. The monster defeats them, telling Seafield to fight it himself. Heading towards the entrance to the monster's lair, he again encounters Sean's ghost, who attacks him. Finding a sword that Dick lost during one of their failed attempts, he slices Sean in half, but Sean regenerates and continues pursuing him. He successfully avoids Sean and enters the monster's lair.

In the lair, Seafield encounters the monster, a female semi-humanoid creature, and attacks her. After a brief skirmish, the monster reveals that she and Seafield are siblings. Their father, a drunk, never knew their mother's true nature until one day when their father arrived at a Milwaukee liquor store five minutes after closing. Sobering up, he was horrified by their mother's true form and killed her. Once the monster came of "killing age," she killed him in revenge. The monster admits that she wanted to put their violence behind them, impregnating a nearby naked man (Dick), as a peace offering to Seafield, but he rejected it by destroying the egg.

Seafeld seems to accept the monster's story and goes for a hug. Instead, he reaches for a pair of hidden knives and kills her. It is then revealed that the monster had lied about the entire story, as she had told Seafeld the wrong closing time at the liquor store. He celebrates his victory only to be harpooned in the eye by Sean's ghost, who thanks him and passes into the afterlife as Seafield transforms into a ghost.

== Cast ==
- Ryland Brickson Cole Tews as Captain Seafield
- Beulah Peters as Nedge Pepsi
- Erick West as Sean Shaughnessy
- Daniel Long as Dick Flynn
- Wayne Tews as Ashcroft Seafield
- Steve Hoetler as Spanish Teacher
- Lucille Tews as Martha Seafield
- Aylah Hutchison as Girlie

== Production ==
=== Development ===
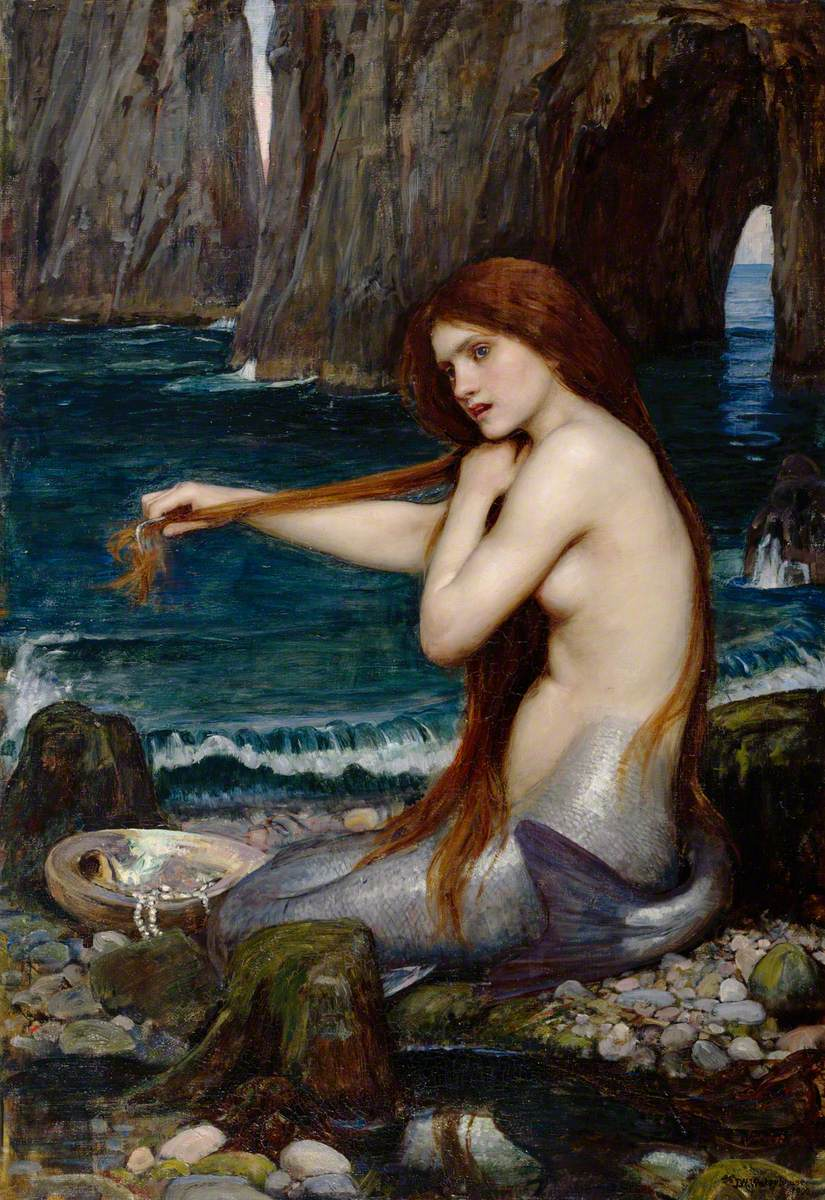
The original concept was based on the idea of a mermaid being washed ashore in Lake Michigan, it was later changed into a lake monster.

Lake Michigan Monster was written, produced, and directed by Ryland Brickson Cole Tews, with development beginning in 2018. Inspiration came about after a conversation between Tews and his close friend Erick West. Tews, at the time in the process of moving to Los Angeles, was visiting Lake Michigan with West where the two jokingly struck up a conversation on what would happen if they were to witness a mermaid washing up on the shore of the lake. Believing the concept had potential, Tews developed the screenplay which became his feature film debut. Concluding that the film would be a low-budget production, Tews developed a screenplay with his friend, the filmmaker Mike Cheslik, with the intention that he (Tews) also starred in the film. According to Tews, the screenplay drew from the British comedy group Monty Python and the early seasons of The Simpsons. Other influences include Guy Maddin's Brand Upon the Brain (2006), and the humor and visual style of Sam Raimi's Evil Dead II (1987).

Early in development, the concept of a mermaid was recast as a lake monster, which they felt was technically "more attainable". Tews and co-writer and producer Cheslik decided to keep the film at a brisk pace, reasoning that its potential audience would otherwise see through the film's limited budget and lose interest. Dialogue and characters were based on around friends and family of Tews, whom he had in mind to play certain roles. In an interview with Comic Book Resources, Tews said that "they more or less play themselves in the movie, and because they're not classically trained actors... I kind of just wrote their characters as who they are in person".

=== Filming ===
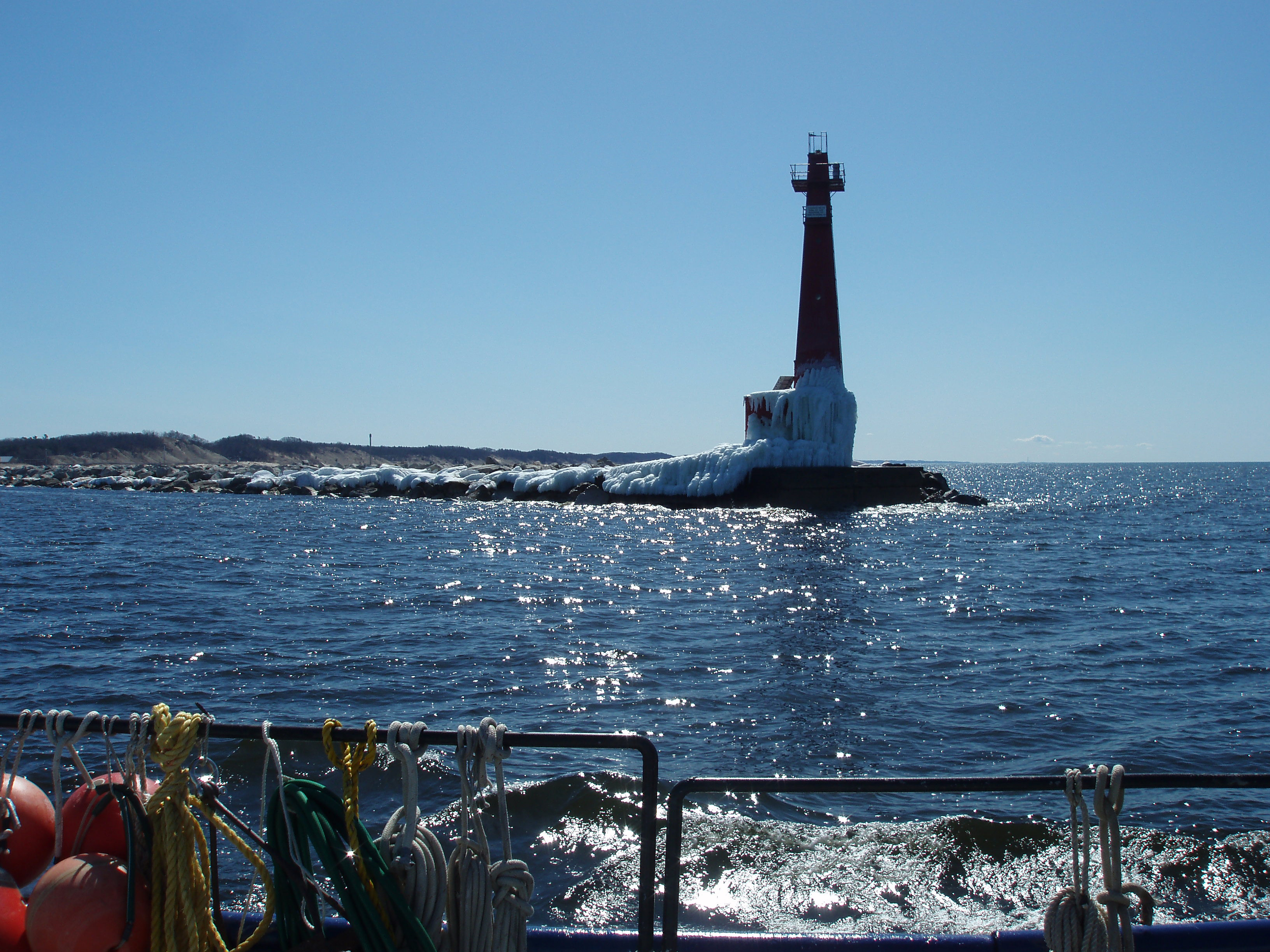
The shores of Lake Michigan, centered in Muskegon, Michigan, served as one of the film's shooting locations.

Principal photography began in March 2017 and lasted for sixteen months. The film was shot mostly around Milwaukee and Muskegon, Michigan, in low-resolution using an old DSLR camera owned by Tews' girlfriend, the actress Beulah Peters, owing to the decision early on in production to shoot in black and white, which Tews later reflected helped the film to stand out among other productions at the time. Tews earned the majority of the film's approximated $7,000 budget from his side job as a pizza delivery man. The cast and crew were mostly Tews' friends, all of whom worked in multiple roles. According to Tews, there was no real director of cinematography, with both cast and crew members operating the camera during production.

As they had a limited budget, the cast and crew were constantly devising cost saving methods. The underwater sequences were the most difficult to shoot. Tews said in an interview with the horror magazine Rue Morgue that the camera operators had a limited supply of oxygen and could only shoot for a short time before surfacing for air.

=== Special effects ===
The monster was designed by the veteran special effects artist and director Joe Castro, with assistance from cast member Erick West, who designed the claws. Castro had already contributed to over fifty films, including Evil Toons (1992), Campfire Tales (1997), Night of the Demons 3 (1997) and The Summer of Massacre (2012). Working with Castro, Tews wanted the monster to be unique and "something you’d never seen before", also having the design resemble an (unmentioned) member of the film's cast. The final design was described by one critic as resembling the early works of Georges Méliès. Cheslik also contributed to the film's computer-generated imagery, working on over 300 effects shots depicted for the film.

== Release ==
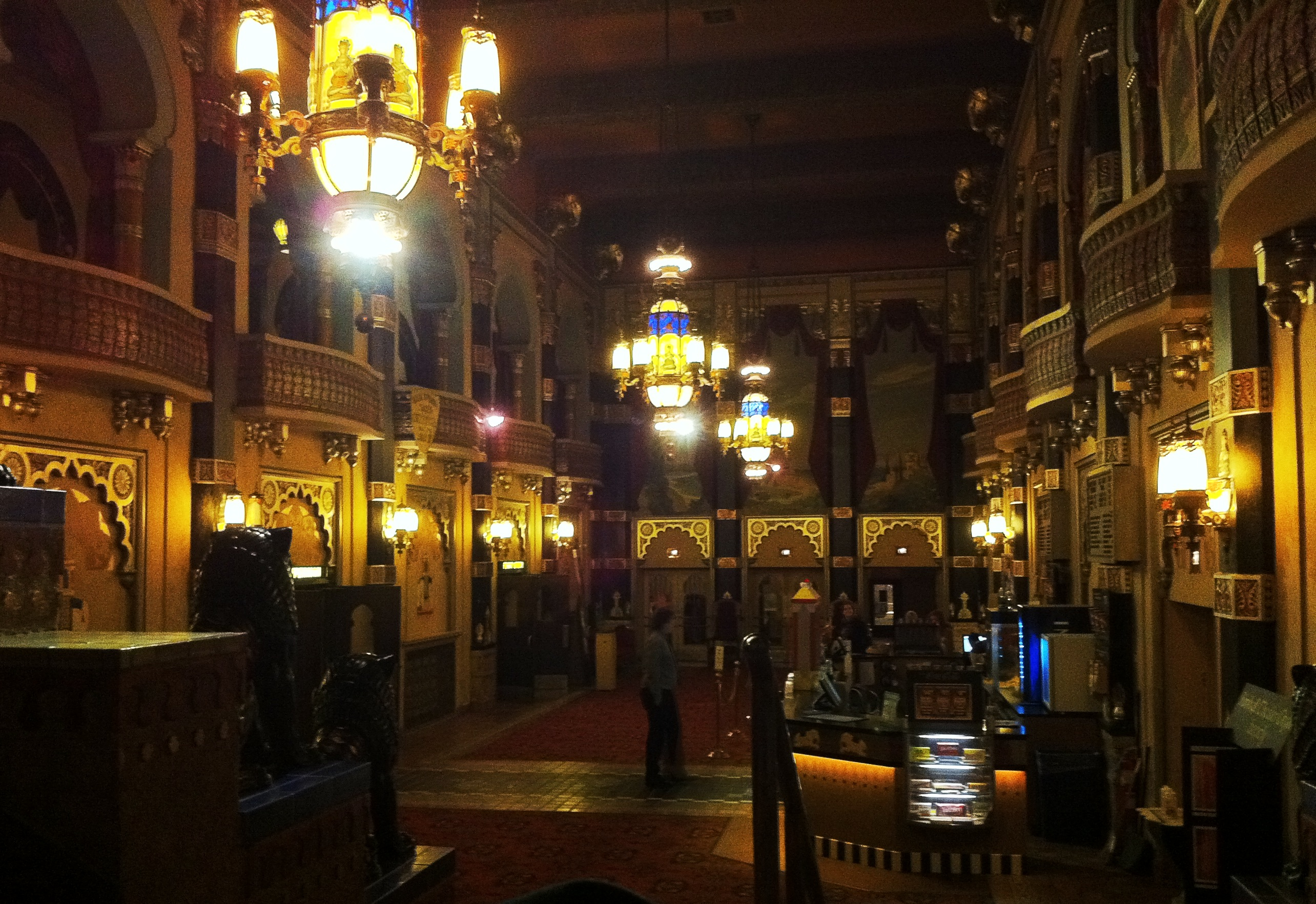
The US premiere of Lake Michigan Monster occurred at the 2018 Milwaukee Film Festival.

Lake Michigan Monster premiered at the Milwaukee Film Festival on October 24, 2018, and listed in the Milwaukee Magazine for their 5 most anticipated films. The film was screened at various film festivals in 2019, starting on February 2, where it was screened at the Beloit International Film Festival, followed by a Q & A with Tews. It was screened on March 9 at the MidWest WeirdFest in its official line-up, and on April 7 at the Wisconsin Film Festival. The 10th Annual Door County Short Film Fest presented a special screening of the film on April 19. From April 7 to June 28 it would have screenings at the Milwaukee Twisted Dreams Film Festival and the Vidlings & Tapeheads Film Festival, respectively. Its international premiere was held on July 25, at the Fantasia International Film Festival in Montreal. It was a part of the official films screened at the 6th annual FilmQuest film festival, where it was shown on September 11. The Bay City-based event Hell's Half Mile Film & Music Festival screened the film on September 27, and was showcased at the Northeast Wisconsin Horror Film Festival on October 11.

Screenings at multiple film festivals continued through the final half of 2019, notably at the Lausanne Underground Film and Music Festival, Nightmares Film Festival, Driftless Film Festival, it premiered in the United Kingdom at the Abertoir Festival. In 2023, the Milwaukee-based Lakefront Brewery hosted screenings of the film on May 20. This was followed by additional showings at the Avalon Theater from May 21 to May 27, with Tews in attendance for a Q & A. after each screening. It was selected for inclusion into the 56th Sitges Film Festival, and was screened in the "Sitges Classics" section of the program in October 2023. In 2024, it was released theatrically for one day by the Cleveland Institute of Art, and later at the Grand Illusion Cinema for the latter's annual horror series "All Monsters Attack!".

=== Home media ===
In July 2020, the distribution company Arrow Films acquired rights for the film, and released it on home media that August. On July 31, the company hosted a 24-hour virtual premiere on the site AltaVOD. The premiere included supplementary interviews from the cast and crew. It was released via the company's channel and video on demand on August 3, and later on Blu-ray in the United Kingdom on November 3, 2020. The release featured "drunk" and "sober" audio commentaries with members of the cast and crew, a third audio commentary with critics Alexandra Heller-Nicholas and Emma Westwood, visual effects breakdowns, a behind-the-scenes photo gallery, and an illustrated booklet featuring an appraisal of the film by Barry Forshaw.

== Reception ==
Lake Michigan Monster received generally positive reviews. Critics focused on its humor, effects and homage to B movie 1960s style cinema. On the review aggregator Rotten Tomatoes, the film holds an approval rating of 90%, based on 20 reviews, and an average rating of 6.90/10. Writing for The Austin Chronicle, Richard Whittaker praised its humor and throwback to low-budget 1980s and 1960s cinema, describing it as a "micro-budget, black-and-white whimsical voyage of wonderful waffling." Other critics highlighted its retroactive style and humor. Referring to it as "a gloriously weird mash-up of genres and decades that revels in its low-budget strangeness and offbeat humor". The Tampa Bay-based publication Creative Loafing praised the film as an "evolution and reinvention of every schlocky black-and-white monster movie from the 1950s that you used to watch on Saturday afternoon TV." Giving a 3.5 out of 5 star award, Drew Tinnin of Dread Central mentioned the film's blend of aspects of various classic films and its dreamlike quality, and idiotic charm, and described it as a "unique blend of 50s sci-fi, superhero team-ups, and seafaring epics". Online publication Film Threat's Joshua Speiser referred to it as "[a] love letter to B-grade 1950s monster movies", commending the humor and Ed Wood-style visual aesthetic.

The practical and special effects were praised. Grant Hermanns of ComingSoon.net praised the film's use of practical effects, highlighting their ingenuity and uniqueness. Milwaukee Record journalist Matt Wild noted the film's effective use of computer-generated imagery for the ghost army and dream sequences. Rue Morgue magazine's Dakota Dahl praised its parodying of low-budget monster movies, highlighting its practical effects as "intentionally cheesy" while also being 'technically impressive'. Writing on the "campy, B-movie design", Boston Hassle's Nick Perry comments that the effects mixed well with the film's weird and humorous elements. Josh Heath of Isthmus praised the effects as "genuinely impressive" and a "visually inventive" highlight of the film.

The offbeat and witty dialogue was favorably reviewed by critics. Tracy Allen of PopHorror compared its comedic elements to Don Coscarelli's 2012 film John Dies at the End, while also commending the film for its fast pacing. On Yorkshire Magazine echoed this sentiment towards the dialogue and visual gags. Gruesome Magazine offered similar praise, further noting the comedic elements often switched between what he called "Vaudvillian corny to laugh-out-loud hilarious". Commenting that some would find the film's "constant barrage of humor, and reliance on meta-humor" a bit overwhelming, Isthmus commended Tews for his manic and energy. Michael Gursky of MovieWeb wrote that the film is "littered with dry wit, slapstick bits, caricaturistic characters, kooky edits, and brief homages to classic B horror, Lake Michigan Monster is an earnestly funny, one-of-a-kind wild joy to watch." While commenting on the film's dry wit "play[s] better than the splashier, wetter knockabout", Kim Newman favorably compared the retroactive comedic elements to Robert Altman's Popeye (1980) and Larry Blamire's Lost Skeleton of Cadavra (2001).

== Awards ==
Lake Michigan Monster has received numerous awards and nominations since its premiere.

Award/association	Date of ceremony	Category	Recipient(s) and nominee(s)	Result	Ref.
Fantasia Film Festival	August 6, 2019	Best International Feature	Ryland Brickson Cole Tews (director), Mike Cheslik (producer)	Won	
FilmQuest	September 14, 2019	Best Visual Effects – Feature	Mike Cheslik	Won	
FilmQuest	September 14, 2019	Best Director – Feature	Ryland Brickson Cole Tews	Nominated	
FilmQuest	September 14, 2019	Best Ensemble Cast – Feature	Lake Michigan Monster	Nominated	
FilmQuest	September 14, 2019	Best Editing – Feature	Mike Cheslik	Nominated	
FilmQuest	September 14, 2019	Best Sound – Feature	Bobb Barito (sound mixer)	Nominated	
FilmQuest	September 14, 2019	Best Score – Feature	Lake Michigan Monster	Nominated	
FilmQuest	September 14, 2019	Best Production Design / Art Direction – Feature	Lake Michigan Monster	Nominated	
FilmQuest	September 14, 2019	Best Costumes – Feature	Lake Michigan Monster	Nominated	
FilmQuest	September 14, 2019	Best Makeup – Feature	Lake Michigan Monster	Nominated	
Nightmares Film Festival	October 31, 2019	Best Actor Feature	Ryland Brickson Cole Tews	Nominated	
Nightmares Film Festival	October 31, 2019	Best Midnight Feature	Lake Michigan Monster	Nominated	
Film Threat Award This!	April 18, 2021	Award This! WTF Indie like "What the F**k is This Movie Even?"	Lake Michigan Monster	Nominated	
Jim Thorpe Independent Film Festival	April 23, 2021	Best Comedy	Lake Michigan Monster	Won	
Jim Thorpe Independent Film Festival	April 23, 2021	Best Actor	Ryland Brickson Cole Tews	Nominated	
