= Chicago Film Critics Association Awards 2024 =

Annual film critics awards

37th Chicago Film Critics Association Awards
- Date: December 11, 2024
- Site: Chicago, Illinois, U.S.

Highlights
- Best Picture: The Brutalist
- Most awards: Nickel Boys (4)
- Most nominations: The Brutalist (9)

The 37th Chicago Film Critics Association Awards were presented to recognize the best in film of 2024. The nominations were announced on December 10, 2024. The Brutalist received the most nominations with nine, followed by The Substance with seven. Furthermore, Anora, Nickel Boys and Wicked each received six nominations.

The winners were announced on December 11, 2024. Nickel Boys won the most awards with four wins, including three for RaMell Ross—namely Best Director and Best Adapted Screenplay (the latter along with co-writer Joslyn Barnes). The Brutalist, however, won Best Film, as well as Best Actor for Adrien Brody. A Real Pain also received two: Best Supporting Actor (Kieran Culkin) and Best Original Screenplay (Jesse Eisenberg). Best Actress went to Marianne Jean-Baptiste (Hard Truths), while Best Supporting Actress went to Natasha Lyonne (His Three Daughters).

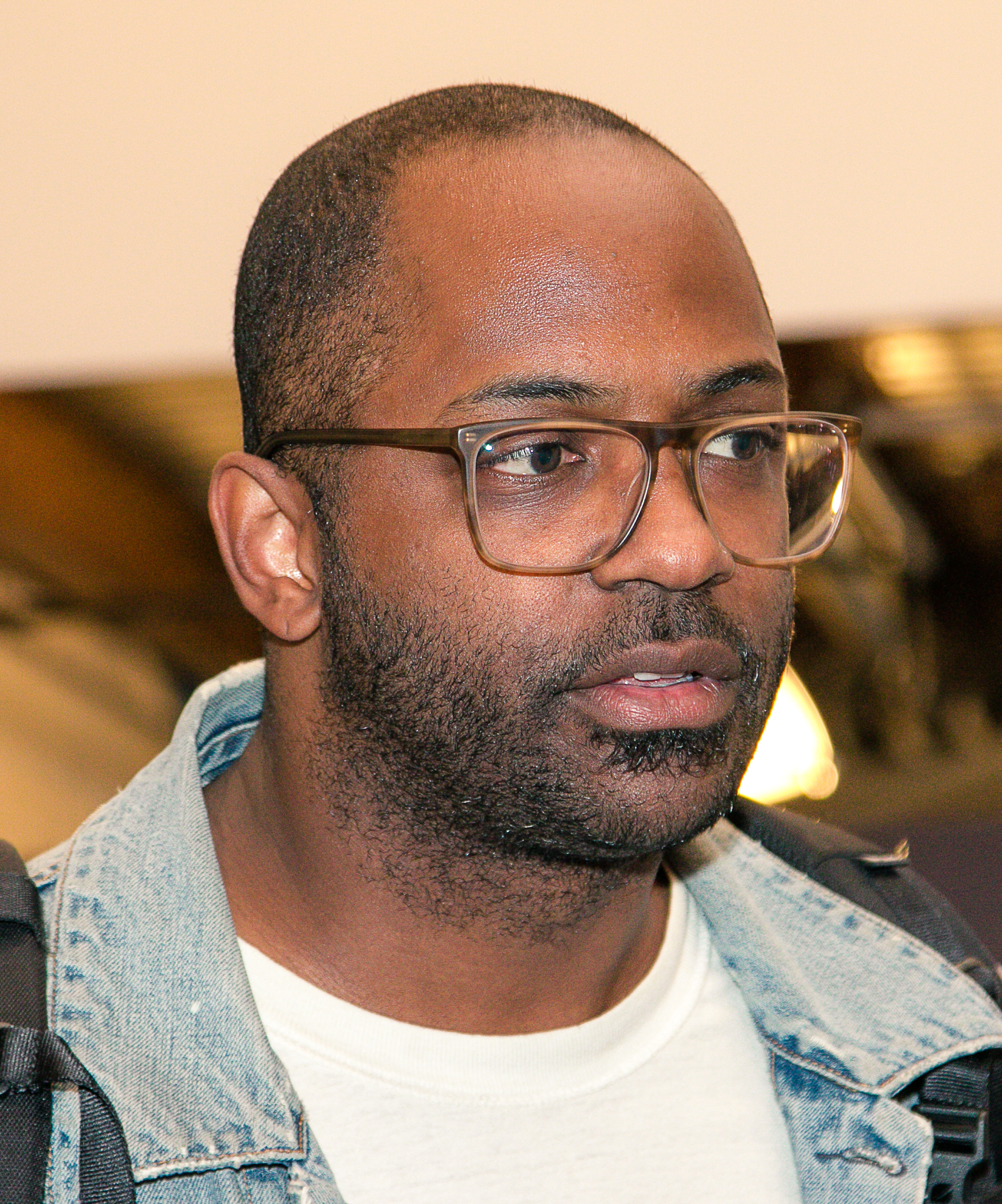
RaMell Ross, Best Director and Breakthrough Filmmaker winner, and Best Adapted Screenplay co-winner

Adrien Brody, Best Actor winner

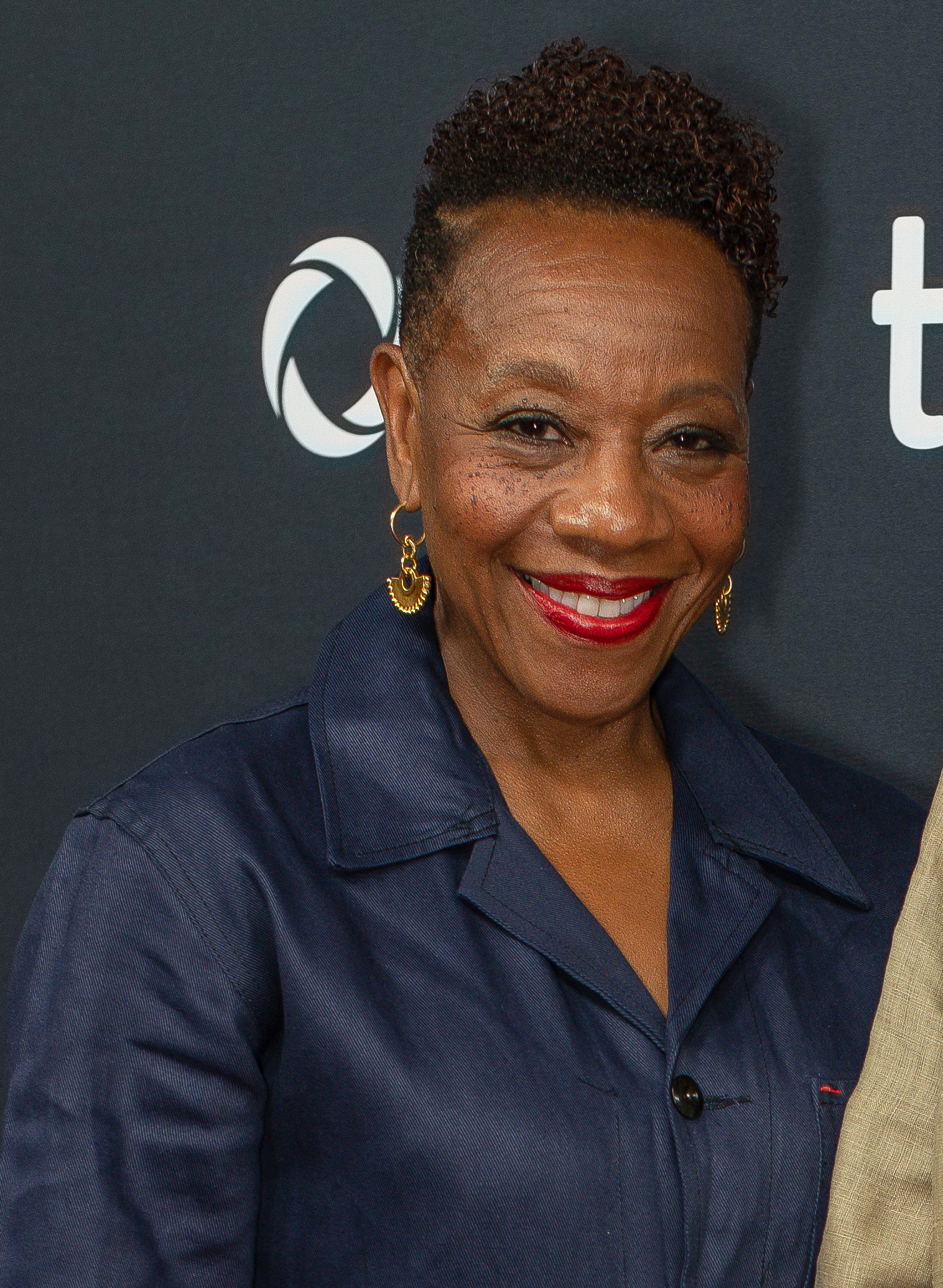
Marianne Jean-Baptiste, Best Actress winner

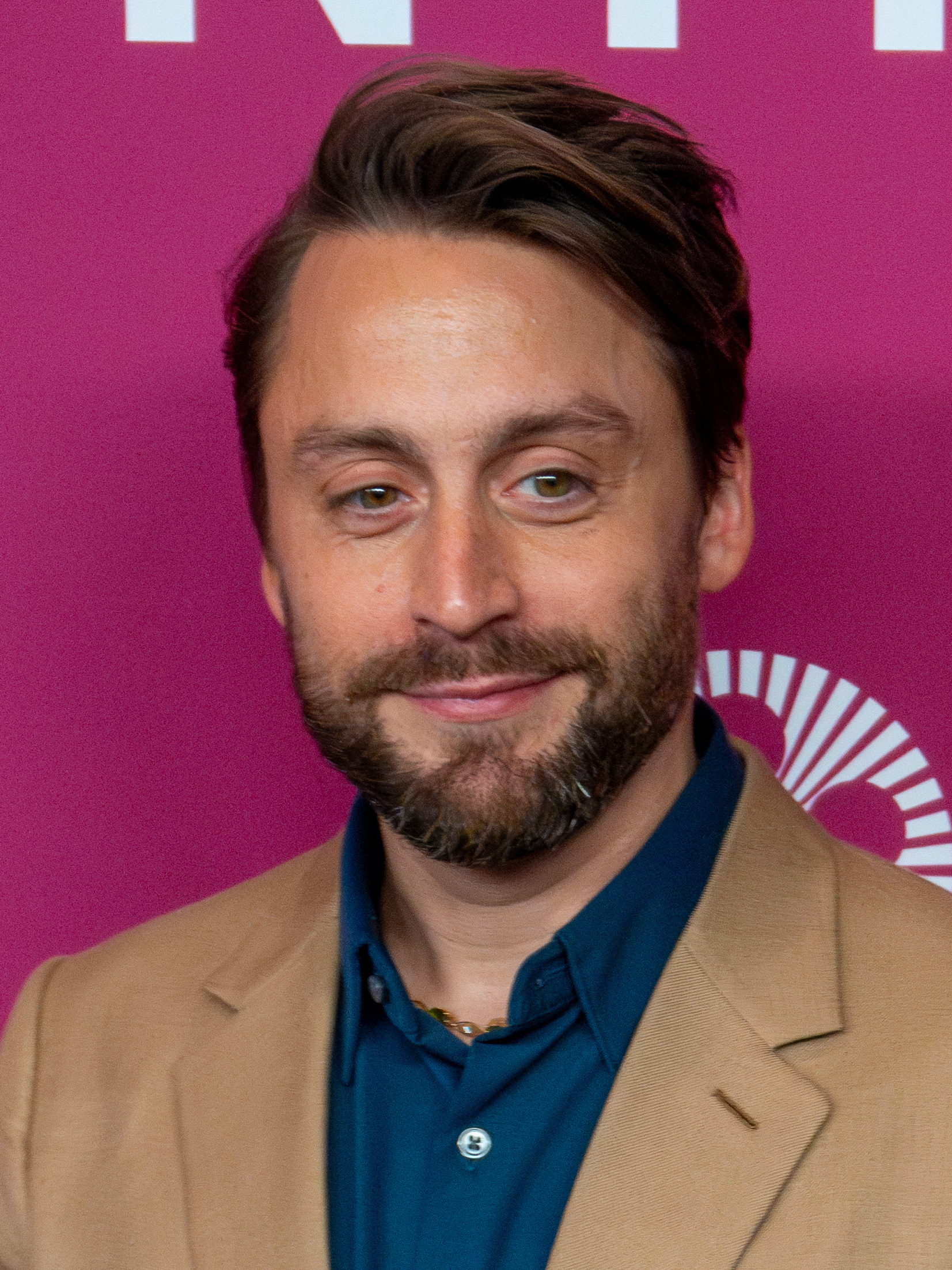
Kieran Culkin, Best Supporting Actor winner

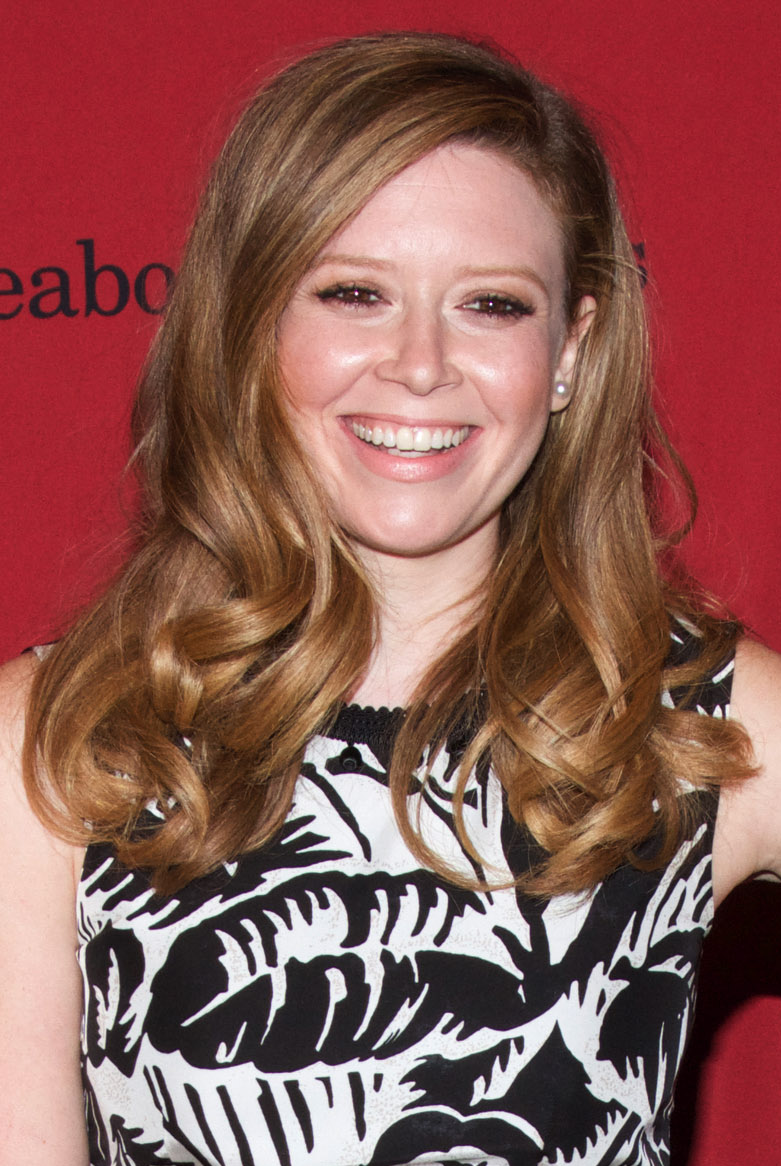
Natasha Lyonne, Best Supporting Actress winner

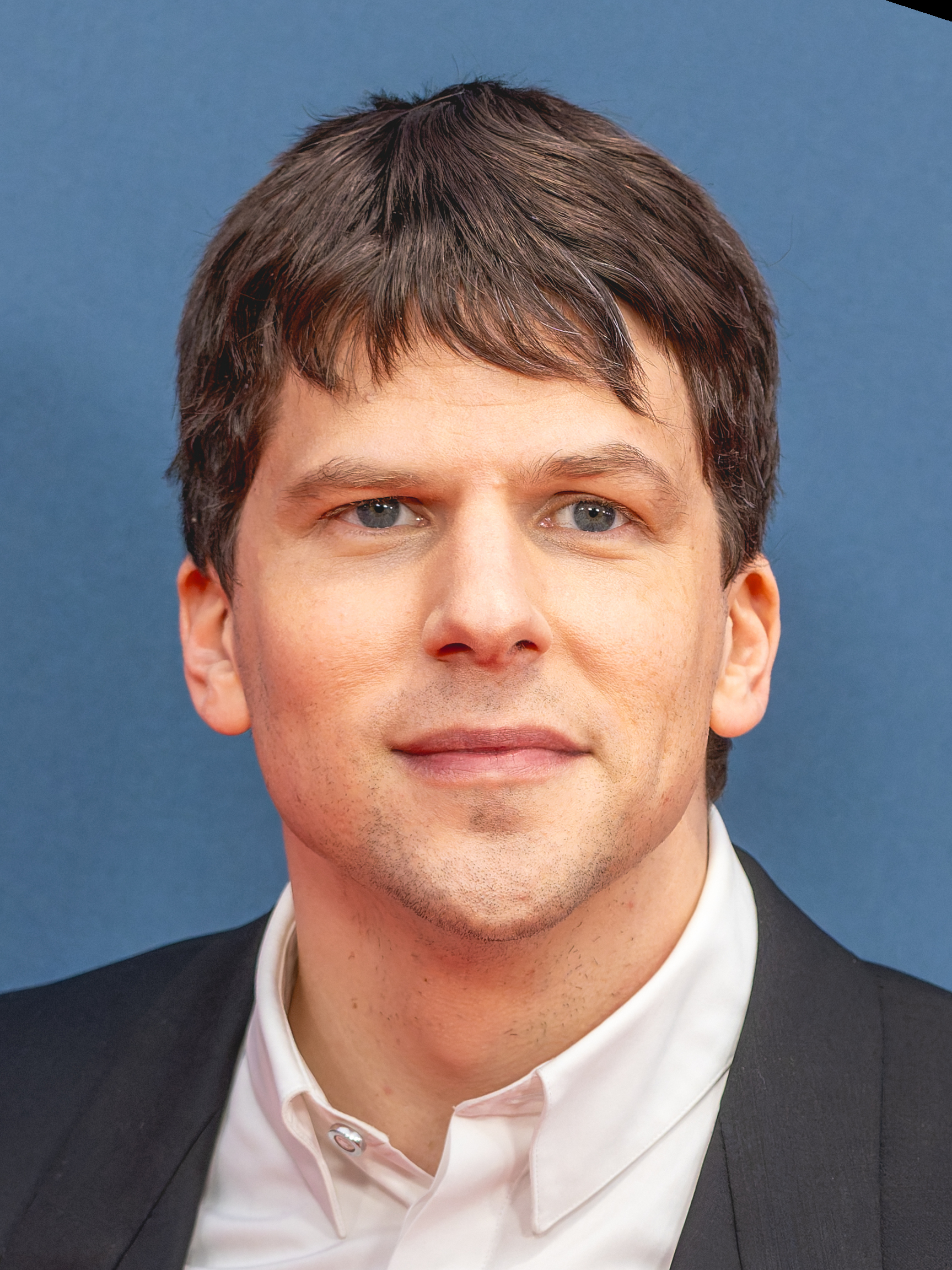
Jesse Eisenberg, Best Original Screenplay winner

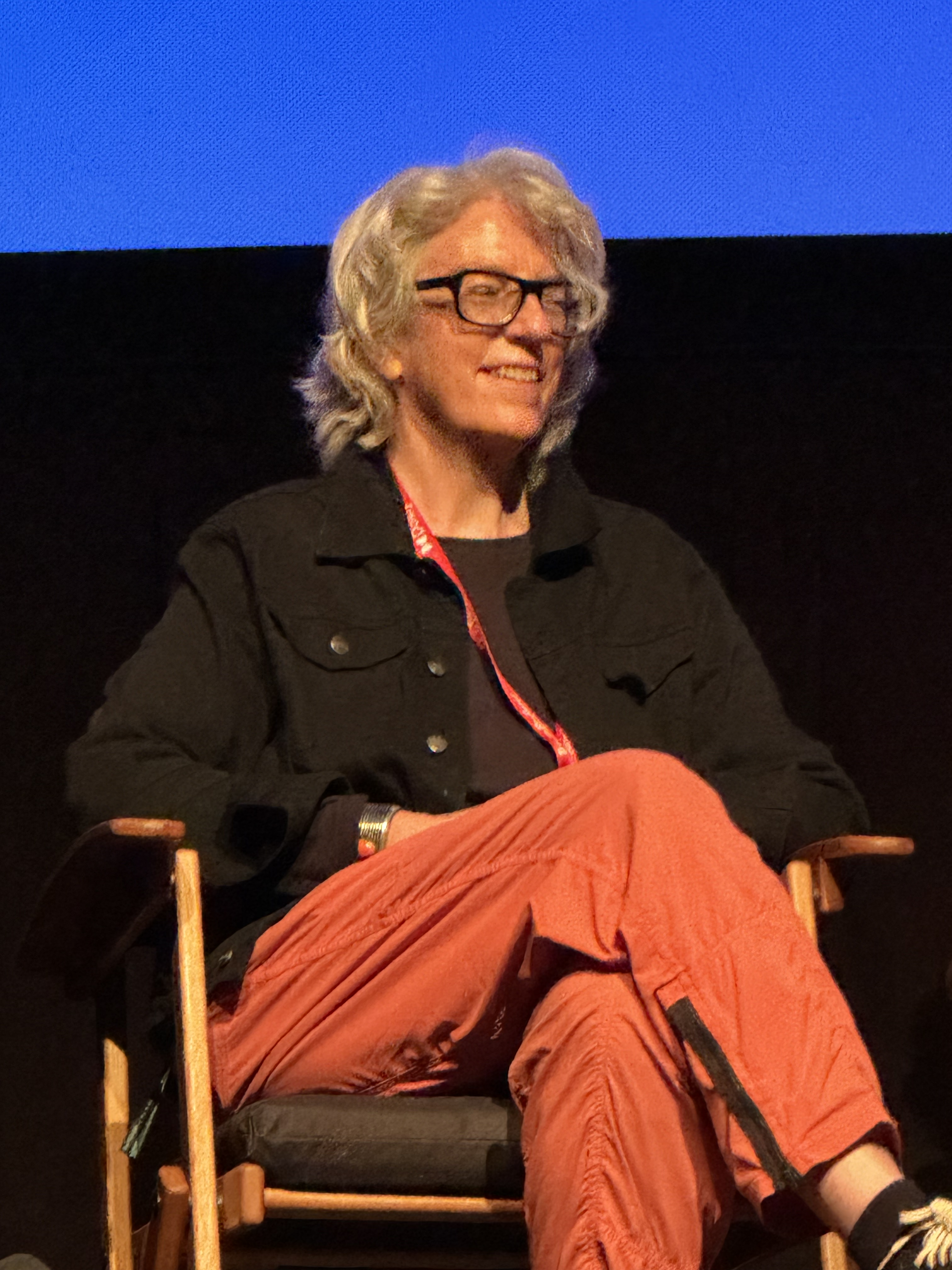
Joslyn Barnes, Best Adapted Screenplay co-winner

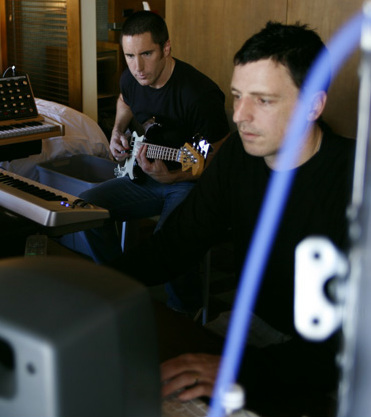
Trent Reznor (left) and Atticus Ross (right), Best Original Score winners

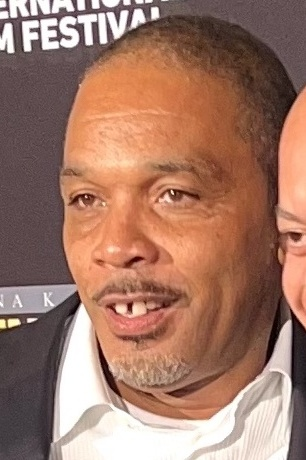
Clarence Maclin, Most Promising Performer winner

== Winners and nominees ==
The winners and nominees for the 37th Chicago Film Critics Association Awards are as follows:

=== Awards ===
Best Film	Best Director
The Brutalist; Anora; Furiosa: A Mad Max Saga; I Saw the TV Glow; Nickel Boys; The Substance	RaMell Ross – Nickel Boys; Sean Baker – Anora; Brady Corbet – The Brutalist; Coralie Fargeat – The Substance; Jane Schoenbrun – I Saw the TV Glow
Best Actor	Best Actress
Adrien Brody – The Brutalist as László Tóth; Timothée Chalamet – A Complete Unknown as Bob Dylan; Colman Domingo – Sing Sing as John "Divine G" Whitfield; Ralph Fiennes – Conclave as Cardinal Thomas Lawrence; Keith Kupferer – Ghostlight as Dan Mueller	Marianne Jean-Baptiste – Hard Truths as Pansy Deacon; Cynthia Erivo – Wicked as Elphaba Thropp; Mikey Madison – Anora as Anora "Ani" Mikheeva; Demi Moore – The Substance as Elisabeth Sparkle; Léa Seydoux – The Beast as Gabrielle
Best Supporting Actor	Best Supporting Actress
Kieran Culkin – A Real Pain as Benji Kaplan; Yura Borisov – Anora as Igor; Clarence Maclin – Sing Sing as Clarence "Divine Eye" Maclin; Guy Pearce – The Brutalist as Harrison Lee Van Buren Sr.; Adam Pearson – A Different Man as Oswald	Natasha Lyonne – His Three Daughters as Rachel; Danielle Deadwyler – The Piano Lesson as Berniece Charles; Ariana Grande-Butera – Wicked as Galinda "Glinda" Upland; Margaret Qualley – The Substance as Sue; Zoe Saldaña – Emilia Pérez as Rita Mora Castro
Best Original Screenplay	Best Adapted Screenplay
A Real Pain – Jesse Eisenberg; Anora – Sean Baker; The Brutalist – Brady Corbet and Mona Fastvold; Challengers – Justin Kuritzkes; The Substance – Coralie Fargeat	Nickel Boys – RaMell Ross and Joslyn Barnes; The Beast – Bertrand Bonello, Guillaume Bréaud, and Benjamin Charbit; Conclave – Peter Straughan; Nosferatu – Robert Eggers; Sing Sing – Clint Bentley and Greg Kwedar
Best Animated Film	Best Documentary Film
Flow; Inside Out 2; Memoir of a Snail; Wallace & Gromit: Vengeance Most Fowl; The Wild Robot	No Other Land; Dahomey; Daughters; Soundtrack to a Coup d'Etat; Sugarcane
Best Foreign Language Film
All We Imagine as Light (France / India / Italy / Luxembourg / Netherlands); Emilia Pérez (France); Evil Does Not Exist (Japan); Red Rooms (Canada); The Seed of the Sacred Fig (France / Germany / Iran)
Best Cinematography	Best Original Score
Nickel Boys – Jomo Fray; The Brutalist – Lol Crawley; Challengers – Sayombhu Mukdeeprom; Dune: Part Two – Greig Fraser; Nosferatu – Jarin Blaschke	Challengers – Trent Reznor and Atticus Ross; The Brutalist – Daniel Blumberg; Dune: Part Two – Hans Zimmer; Nosferatu – Robin Carolan; Wicked – John Powell and Stephen Schwartz; The Wild Robot – Kris Bowers
Best Editing	Best Costume Design
Challengers – Marco Costa; Anora – Sean Baker; The Brutalist – Dávid Jancsó; Furiosa: A Mad Max Saga – Eliot Knapman and Margaret Sixel; Nickel Boys – Nicolas Monsour	Furiosa: A Mad Max Saga – Jenny Beavan; Dune: Part Two – Jacqueline West; Maria – Massimo Cantini Parrini; Nosferatu – Linda Muir; Wicked – Paul Tazewell
Best Art Direction / Production Design	Best Use of Visual Effects
Nosferatu; The Brutalist; Dune: Part Two; The Substance; Wicked	The Substance; Dune: Part Two; Furiosa: A Mad Max Saga; Hundreds of Beavers; Wicked
Milos Stehlik Award for Breakthrough Filmmaker	Most Promising Performer
RaMell Ross – Nickel Boys; Mike Cheslik – Hundreds of Beavers; Vera Drew – The People's Joker; Payal Kapadia – All We Imagine as Light; Greg Kwedar – Sing Sing	Clarence Maclin – Sing Sing as Clarence "Divine Eye" Maclin; Lily Collias – Good One as Sam; Karla Sofía Gascón – Emilia Pérez as Emilia Pérez; Jack Haven – I Saw the TV Glow as Maddy Wilson; Adam Pearson – A Different Man as Oswald

== Awards breakdown ==
The following films received multiple nominations:

Nominations	Film
9	The Brutalist
7	The Substance
6	Anora
6	Nickel Boys
6	Wicked
5	Dune: Part Two
5	Nosferatu
5	Sing Sing
4	Challengers
4	Furiosa: A Mad Max Saga
3	Emilia Pérez
3	I Saw the TV Glow
2	All We Imagine as Light
2	The Beast
2	Conclave
2	A Different Man
2	Hundreds of Beavers
2	A Real Pain
2	The Wild Robot

The following films received multiple wins:

Wins	Film
4	Nickel Boys
2	The Brutalist
2	Challengers
2	A Real Pain
