= Tulip Fever (soundtrack) =

Tulip Fever (Original Motion Picture Soundtrack)

Film score by Danny Elfman
- Released: August 11, 2017
- Recorded: May 21–22 and June 24–25, 2015
- Studios: Abbey Road Studios, London; AIR Studios, London; Studio Della Morte, Los Angeles
- Genre: Film score
- Length: 43:21
- Label: Sony Classical
- Producers: Danny Elfman; Richard Glasser

Danny Elfman chronology
The Circle (2017)	Tulip Fever (2017)	Justice League (2017)

Tulip Fever (Original Motion Picture Soundtrack) is the film score composed by Danny Elfman to the 2017 film Tulip Fever directed by Justin Chadwick. The album was released through Sony Classical Records on August 11, 2017, three weeks ahead of the film's release.

== Background ==
Danny Elfman was associated with the project in September 2014. Much of the film's music was written after Elfman completing his work on Fifty Shades of Grey, but later moved on to other high-profile projects such as Avengers: Age of Ultron and Goosebumps. Elfman completed recording the score during May 21–22, and June 24–25, 2015, at the Abbey Road Studios and AIR Studios in London.

== Release ==
The soundtrack was intended to be released through Sony Classical Records on February 24, 2017, but was delayed as the film's release which scheduled for that date had been pulled off to later date in that calendar year. The album was later released on August 11, 2017, although in some regions, the album released much earlier.

== Reception ==
Jonathan Broxton of Movie Music UK wrote "In terms of its relationship to other Danny Elfman scores throughout the years, Tulip Fever is a comparatively minor work, without the thematic prominence or memorability of his more famous scores to help it stand out from the crowd." James Southall of Movie Wave wrote "This is a nice album, not top-tier Elfman but very satisfying." Tony Frankel of Stage and Cinema wrote "It's not surprising to find that there are five orchestrators, who all cleverly toss in whatever tricks they can in an attempt to make this flower bud sound like it's in full bloom." Filmtracks wrote "Tulip Fever remains one of the composer's most frustrating missed opportunities despite the success it does experience in some corners."

Sheri Linden of The Hollywood Reporter wrote "the ostensibly rising drama lies flat, laid out piece by piece, with an elegant assist from Danny Elfman's score". Amy Glynn of Paste noted that Elfman's score aided the film. Thor Diakow of Daily Hive wrote "Composer Danny Elfman also offers yet another stirring score in the music department." Iom of ON Magazine wrote "The biggest surprise in Tulip Fever lies in the composition by Danny Elfman. His music bears a strong resemblance to that of Alexandre Desplat. Nevertheless, his personal style remains evident in the soundtrack: a new, commendable approach to instrumental arrangement. It represents the language of the mute, the music of the deaf, the colour of the blind, the journey of the lame, the goal of the seekers, and the wealth of the poor; tiny flowers, little songs, bright sounds and colourful splendour. The flowers may bloom and the sounds may linger beyond the cinema visit, for the world of art is vast indeed."

== Track listing ==
No.	Title	Length
1.	"Sophia's Theme"	3:55
2.	"Lost"	2:22
3.	"Willem"	0:45
4.	"Unveiling"	2:51
5.	"Streets"	0:51
6.	"A Storm Is Coming"	1:36
7.	"Ultramarine"	1:14
8.	"Nailed"	1:33
9.	"Reveal"	1:39
10.	"Streets – Part 2"	1:57
11.	"Devastation"	3:55
12.	"Maria's Theme"	0:59
13.	"Wait"	3:30
14.	"It's Done"	1:59
15.	"Storm"	2:32
16.	"Grand Finale"	6:43
17.	"Happy Family"	2:28
18.	"Sophia's Theme" (Reprise)	2:32
Total length:		43:21

== Personnel ==
Credits adapted from liner notes:

- Music composer and producer – Danny Elfman
- Album producer – Richard Glasser
- Orchestrators – Dave Slonaker, Edgardo Simone, Ed Trybek, Marc Mann, Steve Bartek
- Conductor – Rick Wentworth
- Contractor – Isobel Griffiths
- Choirmaster – Scott Price
- Recording – Peter Cobbin, Noah Snyder
- Recordist – Chris Barrett
- Mixing – Noah Snyder
- Mastering – Pat Sullivan
- Music editor – Chad Birmingham, Graham Sutton, Sally Boldt
- Score coordinator – Melisa McGregor
- Soundtrack coordinator – Sienna Jackson
- Musical assistance – Melissa Karaban
- Copyist – Dave Hage
- Booklet design – WLP Ltd
- Music business and legal affairs – David A. Helfant
- Licensing manager (Sony Classical Records) – Mark Cavell
- Product development manager (Sony Classical Records) – Guido Eitberger
