= Hundreds of Beavers =

2022 film by Mike Cheslik

- Theatrical release poster by Kyle Hilton
- Directed by: Mike Cheslik
- Written by: Mike Cheslik; Ryland Tews
- Produced by: Matt Sabljak; Kurt Ravenwood; Ryland Tews
- Starring: Ryland Tews; Olivia Graves; Wes Tank; Doug Mancheski; Luis Rico
- Cinematography: Quinn Hester
- Edited by: Mike Cheslik
- Music by: Chris Ryan
- Production company: SRH
- Distributed by: Cineverse
- Release dates: September 29, 2022 (Fantastic Fest); January 26, 2024 (United States)
- Running time: 108 minutes
- Country: United States
- Language: English
- Budget: $150,000
- Box office: $1.6 million

Hundreds of Beavers is a 2022 American slapstick comedy film directed by Mike Cheslik in his feature directorial debut, and written by Cheslik and Ryland Tews. The black-and-white, largely dialogue-free independent film stars Tews as applejack maker Jean Kayak who, in trying to win the hand of a merchant's daughter, finds himself embroiled in a conflict with a colony of beavers.

Cheslik and Tews, who had previously collaborated on multiple projects including Lake Michigan Monster (2018), developed the idea for Hundreds of Beavers in October 2018. Conceived as a parody of The Revenant (2015) and survival films, the film was influenced by silent movies and slapstick comedies, and was designed to be akin to watching a let's play video. Hundreds of Beavers was shot on a low budget of $150,000 in rural Wisconsin and Michigan across twelve weeks during the winter of 2019–20; the beavers and most of the other animals throughout the film were portrayed by actors in mascot costumes.

Following two years of post-production, Hundreds of Beavers premiered at Fantastic Fest on September 29, 2022. Cheslik and Tews chose to self-distribute the film, which began a limited theatrical release on January 26, 2024, and received a video on demand release on April 15, 2024. Hundreds of Beavers received critical acclaim and numerous accolades, with multiple outlets listing it among the best films of the year in 2024. Its theatrical run grossed $1.6 million.

== Plot ==
Beavers sneak into Jean Kayak's apple orchard and eat the support beams of his two giant applejack kegs. Jean is too inebriated to notice one keg roll away. The second keg smashes into Jean's house and explodes, destroying the orchard and knocking out Jean. Awakening in winter, he unsuccessfully tries to catch rabbits. Jean encounters a group of beavers collecting logs; delirious with hunger, he imagines them as food and attacks them but each time he is overpowered and beaten. He learns to catch fish by making his fingers bleed and using them as bait. When he sells the fish to a local merchant, he notices the Master Fur Trapper collecting a large sum of money for pelts.

Jean buys a knife and cuts his shirt and pants into rope, setting snares to catch rabbits. The rabbits prove elusive, however, and raccoons raid his traps when they do catch rabbits. He catches a raccoon and meets an Indian Fur Trapper who trades him snowshoes for the knife. Jean takes the raccoon to the merchant's daughter, the Furrier, (Note: At 33 minutes into the film, in the main titles, the Merchant is identified as the Furrier's "Pa", an affectionate term for father. Some sources have identified the Furrier as the Merchant's daughter.) who makes him clothing from the pelt.

Jean breaks his leg when he falls into a pit made by the Master Fur Trapper, who rescues him and makes Jean his protégé. Wolves begin killing the Master Fur Trapper's dogs. The Master Fur Trapper fights the wolves when they attack in force, saves Jean – who had become drunk to calm his nerves – and gives Jean his trapping guide before being killed. Unable to make sense of the guide, Jean erases it and starts his own, remapping the area. He finds creative ways to trap animals, trading with the merchant and the Indian Fur Trapper for better gear. He and the Furrier develop a mutual attraction, but the merchant demands hundreds of beavers before he can allow them to marry. At the same time, the beavers are constructing a massive log structure, and a pair of beavers styled after Sherlock Holmes and Dr. Watson investigate Jean's traps.

Jean realizes that the wolves had taken the Master Fur Trapper's hoard of pelts into their den. The beavers, alerted by the Sherlock and Watson beavers, send a large force after Jean. He lures them into the wolf den and seals the entrance with icicles, allowing the wolves to slaughter them. Jean takes the bodies to the merchant's cabin, but is fooled by two-dimensional theatrical scenery created by the Sherlock and Watson beavers, who take the bodies to be buried.

Jean sneaks into the beaver dam, where he discovers his remaining keg of applejack. Avoiding the temptation of drinking, he follows the beavers with the bodies but is caught by the beaver police. Found guilty at beaver trial, Jean is to be executed, skinned, and made into a coat. Realizing that he can slip out of snares by releasing tension, Jean escapes his restraints and overpowers the beavers. While making his way out, he notices the beavers have built a rocket ship from his applejack keg and accidentally causes its launch. The rocket goes off course, breaking the dam and causing a flood which creates Green Bay.

Jean interrupts the beaver funeral and rolls the bundle of beaver bodies into a snowball, which he rides toward the merchant's cabin. The surviving beavers assemble into a massive kaiju-like figure which runs after him. The Indian Fur Trapper latches onto the rocket with a grappling arrow and directs it to the giant figure, which is broken apart. The snowball of hundreds of beaver pelts stops at the merchant's cabin, and Jean is allowed to marry the Furrier.

== Cast ==
Credits adapted from the Cartuna Blu-ray booklet.

- Ryland Tews as Jean Kayak
- Olivia Graves as The Furrier
- Doug Mancheski as The Merchant
- Wes Tank as The Master Fur Trapper
- Luis Rico as The Indian Fur Trapper

Brandon Kirkham served as puppeteer for various animal characters.

=== Costumed performers ===
- Erick West, Elle R. Schultz, Max Hey, Jay Brown, James Stoeffel, Mike Wesolowski, Matt Haupt, Maurice Gross, Daniel Long, Mike Cheslik, Jerry Kurek, Ryland Tews, Chris Hoelter and Jon Truei as Beavers
- Erick West, James Stoeffel and Ryland Tews as Beaver Sherlock
- Max Hey, Jay Brown and Tyler Walker as Beaver Watson
- Tyler Walker, Jon Truei and Ryland Tews as Beaver Court Jury
- Brendan Steere as Beaver Judge
- Mike Wesolowski and Jason Hoerchner as Beaver Bailiffs
- Jerry Kurek as Beaver Lawyer
- Jason Hoerchner, Jon Truei, Jay Brown, Mike Wesolowski, Tobias Christian Wong, Stephen Cervantes and Ryan Fox as Beaver Fight Team
- Jon Truei, Erick West and Daniel Long as Raccoons
- Jerry Kurek, Daniel Long, Erick West, Chris Hoelter, Mike Cheslik, Max Hey, Mike Wesolowski and Chris Hoelter as Rabbits
- Jessica Knap, Max Hey and Daniel Long as Skunks
- Tyree Pope III, Daniel Long, Maurice Gross, Max Hey, Mike Wesolowski, Jay Brown, John Horne and Mike Cheslik as Dogs
- Daniel Long, Max Hey, Ryland Tews and Mike Wesolowski as Wolves
- Mike Wesolowski as Horse Head
- Ryland Tews, Mike Wesolowski, Jessica Knap, Chris Hoelter and Daniel Long as Horse Butts
- Elle R. Schultz as Beaver Kaiju

== Production ==
=== Development and pre-production ===
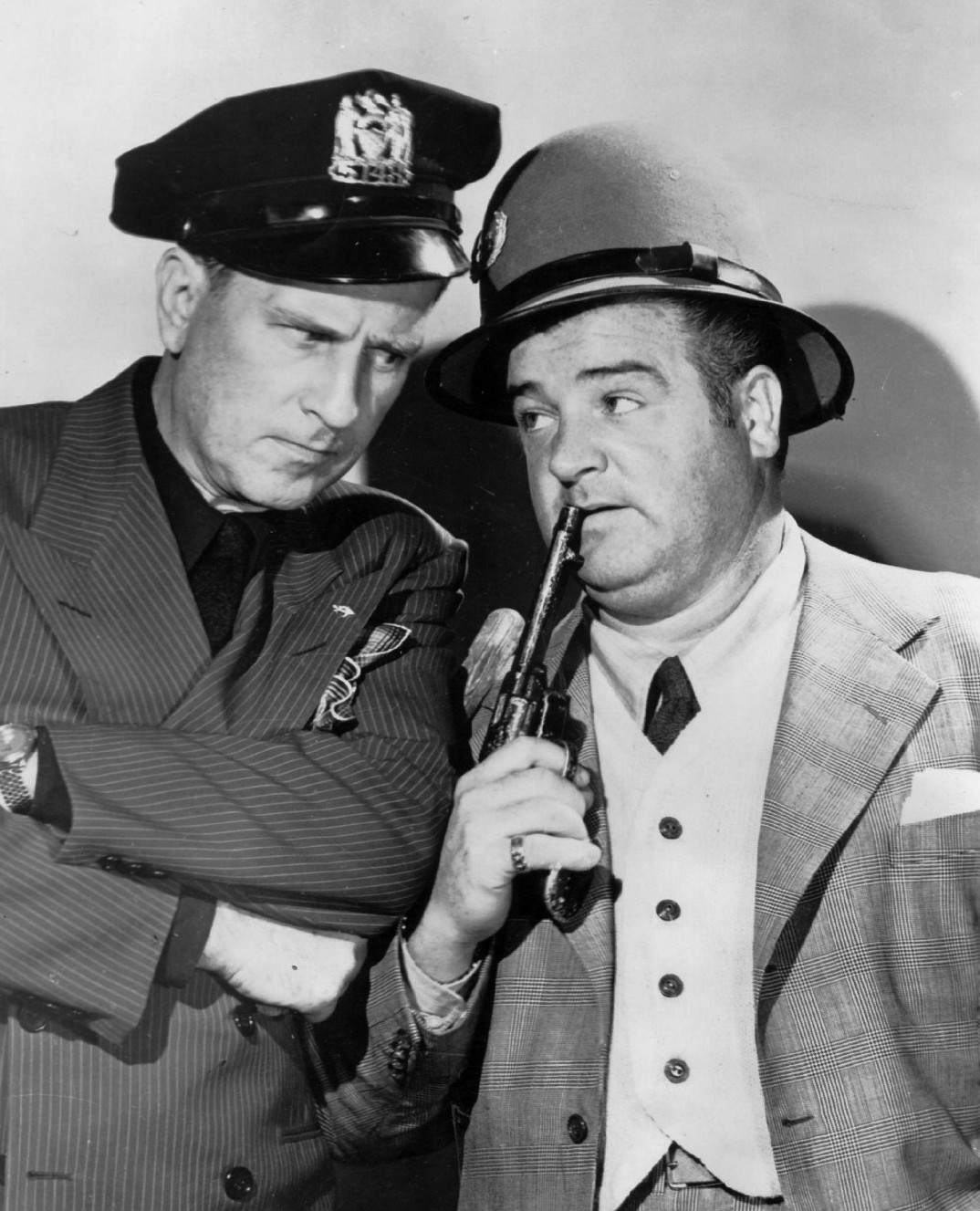
Abbott and Costello

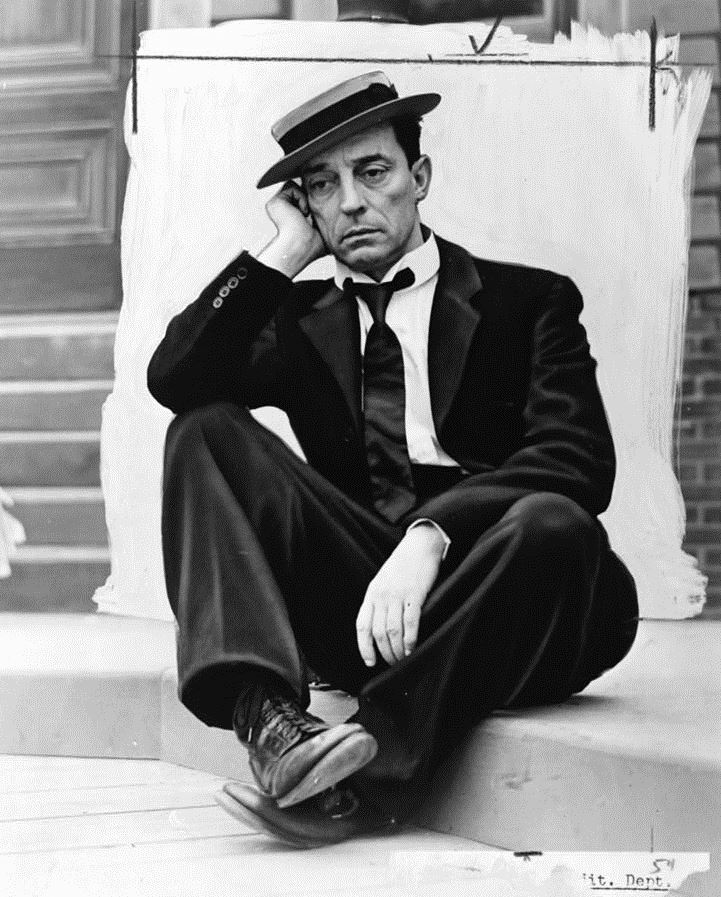
Buster Keaton

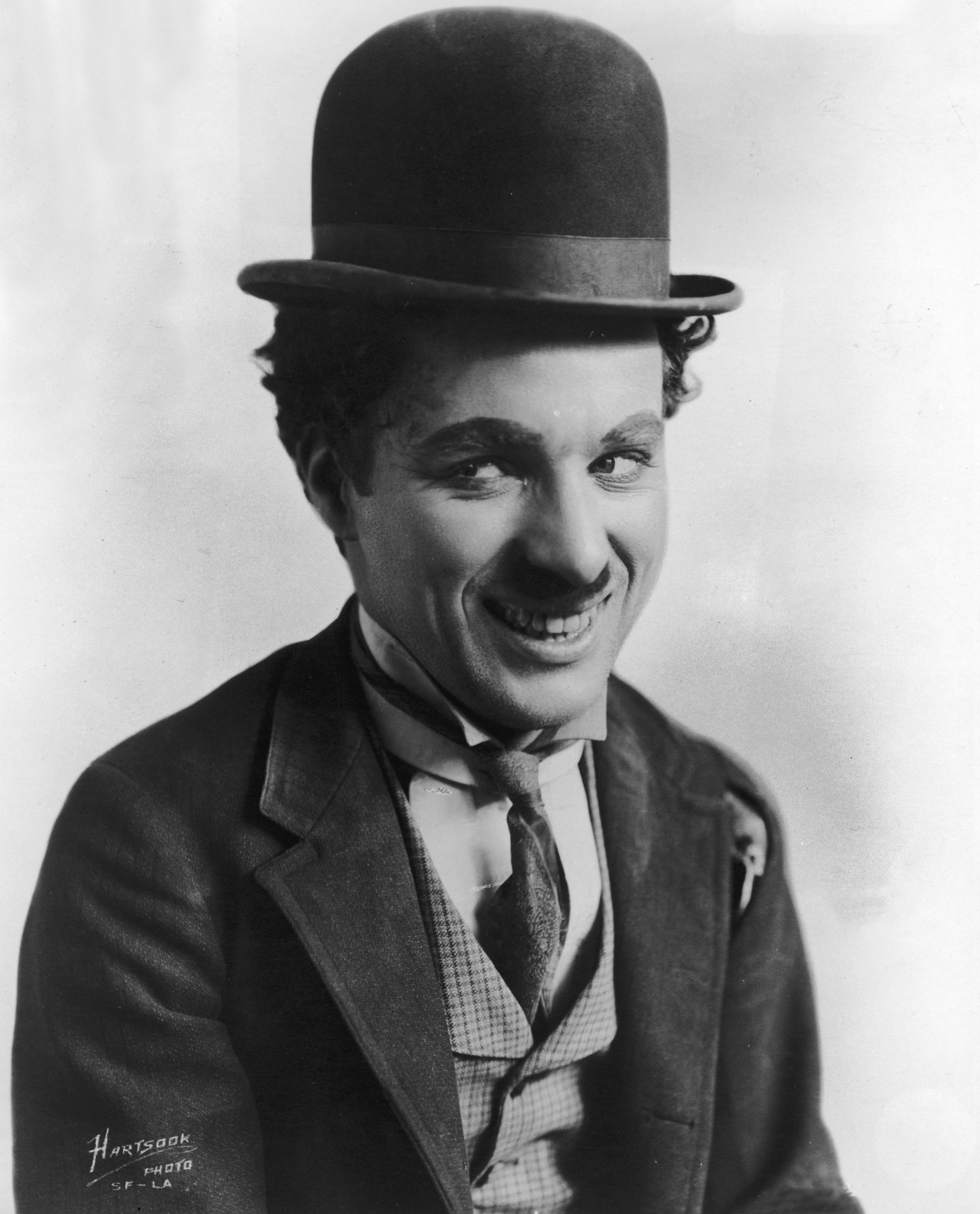
Charlie Chaplin

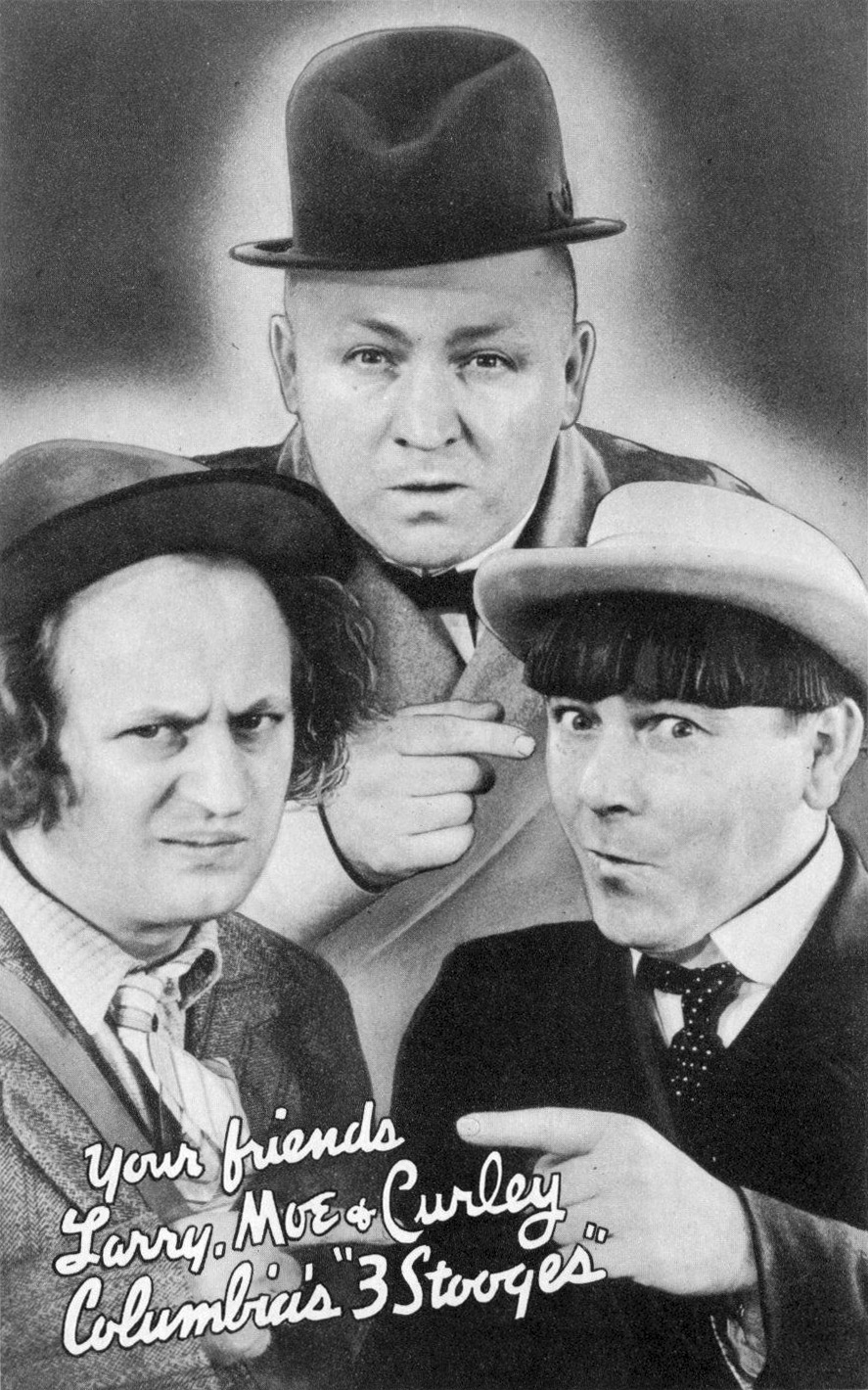
The Three Stooges

Hundreds of Beavers's slapstick comedy was inspired by the works of Abbott and Costello, Buster Keaton, Charlie Chaplin, and The Three Stooges.

Filmmakers Mike Cheslik and Ryland Tews met at Whitefish Bay High School in Wisconsin and came to collaborate on film projects starting in 2008. The duo made Lake Michigan Monster (2018), a black-and-white film that cost $7,000. Cheslik and Tews formed the idea for Hundreds of Beavers while at a bar in Milwaukee in October 2018. Cheslik wrote, directed, edited, and created the visual effects for the film while Tews played the lead role. It was originally conceived as a parody of The Revenant (2015) and other survival films. The script was a two-page treatment filled in with notecards and gag drawings. Cheslik likened Jean's character progression to Joseph Campbell's conception of the hero's journey, as Jean betters himself from an alcoholic struggling in the snow to a conquering champion.

Inspiration was drawn from the Mario video games, America's Funniest Home Videos, and the slapstick comedy of Abbott and Costello, Buster Keaton, Charlie Chaplin, and The Three Stooges. Ernst Lubitsch's The Wildcat (1921) also inspired the film. Tews based his movements in the film on Jackie Chan, while specific allusions to silent comedies include a scene that references Seven Chances (1925), in which Keaton is chased by a horde of angry women. The film's poster is similar to the poster for It's a Mad, Mad, Mad, Mad World (1963) and was praised as one of the 50 best film posters of 2024 by IndieWire. Ravenwood noted the popularity of the poster as one of their highest selling pieces of merchandise.

The second act of Hundreds of Beavers was designed to be like watching a let's play video. Cheslik stated that the audience "actually watch Ryland play the whole video game". Jean's progression and improvement in the film evokes systems used in role-playing video games. GameSpot noted that the merchant's shop operated like those in The Legend of Zelda and that the video game features in the film were not used as a joke, but to convey information. Jean climbs trees in the same way that Mario on the Nintendo Entertainment System does. The sequence of Jean sneaking around the beaver dam was noted by GameSpot to be similar to the Ratchet & Clank and Oddworld series.

Tews has described Lake Michigan Monster, Hundreds of Beavers and his forthcoming film, I Have a Bomb!, as a "punk rock indie film trilogy".

=== Production and post-production ===
The film was shot in black-and-white and had a budget of $150,000. Initial fundraising was sufficient to film the first act, which was shot over the course of three to four weeks. This footage was then shown to other investors, whose financing allowed the remainder of the film to be shot. It was filmed over the course of twelve weeks during the winter of 2019–2020. The film's six-person crew used a Panasonic GH5 at a video resolution of 1080p. Nine weeks of filming was done in Stephenson, Michigan, and the northern Wisconsin towns of Manitowish Waters, Pembine, and Superior. The crew stayed at a cabin in Manitowish Waters.

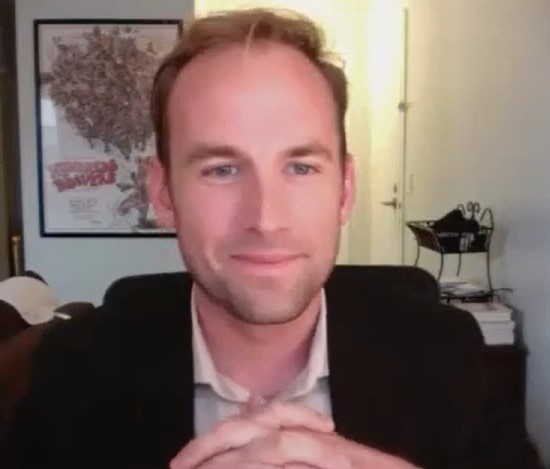
Mike Cheslik discussing the film on YouTube in 2024

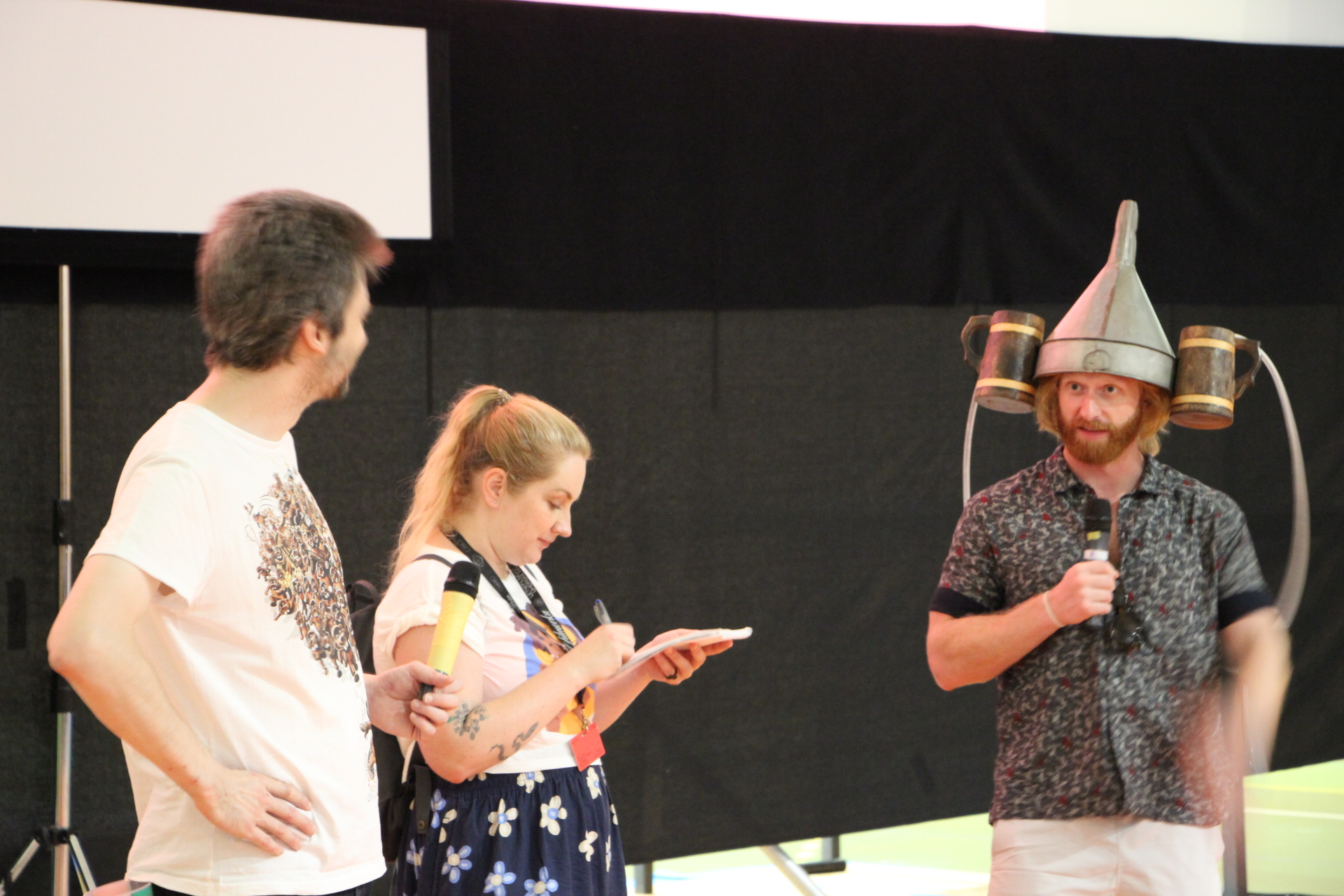
Ryland Tews at the 50th Summer Film School in Uherské Hradiště in 2024

Hundreds of Beavers was made by Mike Cheslik and Ryland Tews.

The beaver suits were purchased online from a Chinese mascot website, with the teeth modified by the filmmakers. Erick West, Daniel Long, Jay Brown, Elle R. Schultz and Mike Wesolowski, among others, wore the beaver costumes. Jon Truei was the fight choreographer. Over 1,500 visual effects were made using Adobe After Effects. Editing and post-production took two years to complete. Tews's father Wayne composed and performed songs for the film. Sound designer Bobb Barito used wooden objects including kazoos and clapper toys for the sounds in the film and used audio distortion for scenes including violence as he felt that "Violence sounds funniest when it's really distorted".

== Release ==
=== Theatrical ===
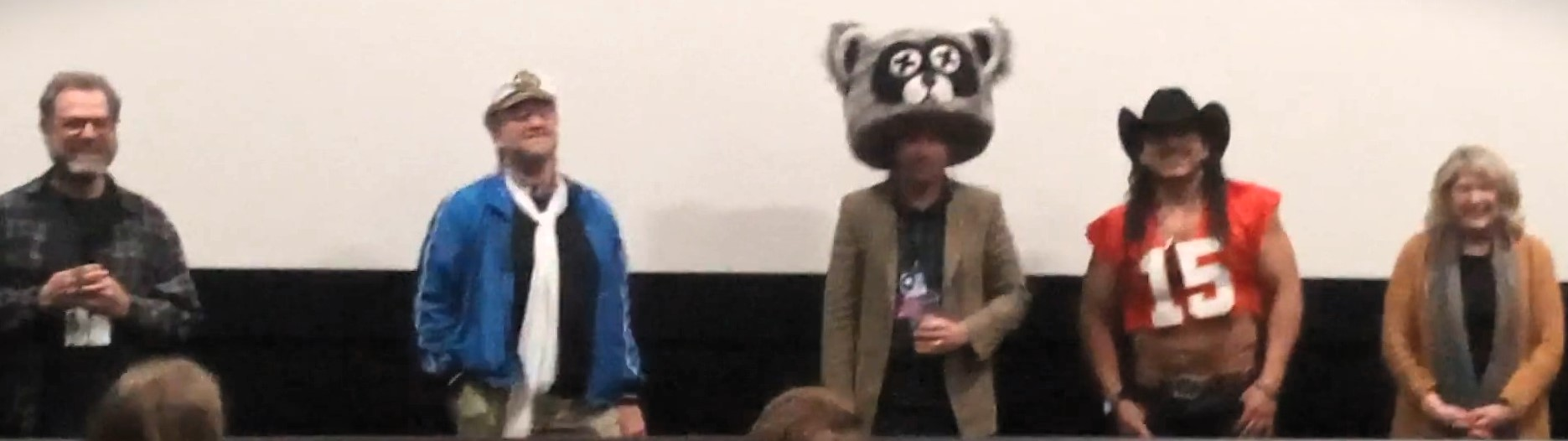
Cast at the 2023 Kansas City FilmFest International. Left to right: Wayne Tews, Ryland Tews, Mike Cheslik, Luis Rico, Jean Tews

Hundreds of Beavers premiered at Fantastic Fest on September 29, 2022. It premiered in Canada at the 2023 Fantasia International Film Festival. It was also shown at the Library of Congress, at Quentin Tarantino's New Beverly Cinema for two weeks, and at the Sitges Film Festival in Spain.

Cheslik and the producers chose to distribute the film themselves and Kurt Ravenwood oversaw the promotion campaign. They were aided by Jessica Rosner, a former executive at Kino International. Milwaukee-based ad agency SRH (named after Matt Sabljak, Ravenwood, and Sam Hogerton) spent $37,000 promoting the film. Hundreds of Beavers was shown at fourteen independent theaters in the Great Lakes region, including the Music Box Theatre in Chicago. By November 2024, the film had been shown in no more than 33 theaters at once. An encore showing was conducted in around 70 theaters starting on December 5. A 35mm print of the film was shown on February 26, 2025, in Dallas, Texas.

Aerofilms premiered the film in the Czech Republic on May 9, 2024. Lightbulb Film Distribution distributed the film in Australia, Ireland, New Zealand, and the United Kingdom beginning on July 9. Tews toured 40 cities in the United Kingdom over the course of four months. A German release, managed by Lightbulb and 24 Bilder, opened in 68 theaters on February 13, 2025.

=== Home media ===
The filmmakers rejected distribution offers made after festival showings as those plans would only show the film in theaters for a week before sending it to video on demand. The streaming rights were sold to Cineverse. The film received a video on demand release on April 15, 2024. It was released on Blu-ray by Vinegar Syndrome on January 28, 2025, and has sold 10,000 copies as of March 2025. A limited release of 100 VHS copies of the film was distributed by Witter Entertainment. It was added to Dropout in 2026.

== Reception ==
=== Box office ===
Hundreds of Beavers grossed $940,092 in the United States and Canada, and $618,014 in other territories, for a worldwide total of $1,558,106. The showing at the Music Box Theatre grossed $8,000 in one day, the highest individual gross for any screening of the film. More than half of the film's box office gross was made after the film was released through video on demand. Its box office revenue surpassed $1 million after its release in Germany. In addition to the box office revenue, $500,000 was grossed on digital platforms and $250,000 worth of merchandise was sold.

=== Critical response ===
On the review aggregator website Rotten Tomatoes, 97% of 108 critics' reviews are positive. The website's consensus reads: "Sustaining a zany premise with stylistic bravura and inspired gags, Hundreds of Beavers is a comedic gem that gives a dam." Metacritic, which uses a weighted average, gave the film a score of 82 out of 100, based on 16 critics.

Dennis Harvey, writing for Variety, praised the film's editing for maximizing the effectiveness of its gags, and praised the soundtrack and the film's visual imagination for an independent film that maintains a consistent pace. Peter Bradshaw, who gave the film four out of five stars in The Guardian, praised the "sheer sustained silliness" and the "film's absolute dedication to gag productivity". Nick Schager, writing for The Daily Beast, declared the film "a marvel of slapstick invention" and "an overstuffed live-action homage to the golden age of animation". It received an 8 out of 10 review from FilmInk.

Pete Volk, writing for Polygon, praised the film's visuals despite its small budget as it "nevertheless looks better than many modern blockbuster productions". Vulture awarded it Best Stunt in a Non-Action Film for the brawl in which Jean frees himself from his captors. Matt Zoller Seitz, who gave the film four out of four stars in his RogerEbert.com review and later listed it as the fourth best film of the year, compared its low-budget filmmaking style to Eraserhead (1977), El Mariachi (1992), and the films of Wes Anderson. Nick De Semlyen, giving the film four out of five stars in Empire, compared the film's "wacky wavelength and pure energy" to the early work of Sam Raimi and Peter Jackson. Daniel Scheinert praised the film, stating that it "is the key to making theatres fun, and is the future of cinema".

Following the film's wide release on streaming in 2024, Hundreds of Beavers was listed as the 3rd best film of the year by The A.V. Club, and among the ten best films by the Los Angeles Times and The Boston Globe. The editors of RogerEbert.com listed it as a runner-up for the ten best films of 2024 and Slant Magazine listed it as a runner-up for the 25 best films. It placed 38th in IndieWire's poll of 177 critics. The Boston Globe also gave a special mention to Tews's performance for its critics' selection of the ten best performances of 2024. Film critic Alonso Duralde named Hundreds of Beavers as the best film of 2024. Rob Hunter listed Hundreds of Beavers as the 15th best film of the 2020s in a 2025 /Film article.

== Works cited ==
=== News ===
- "The 25 Best Films of 2024". Slant Magazine. December 13, 2024. Archived from the original on December 20, 2024.
- "The 25 best films of 2024". The A.V. Club. December 17, 2024. Archived from the original on December 20, 2024.
- Basile, Annette (July 5, 2024). "'Hundreds of Beavers' Review: Slapstick Reinvented for a Modern Audience". FilmInk. Archived from the original on July 5, 2024.
- Bolt, Neil (April 3, 2024). "Hundreds of Beavers VOD Release Date Set for Epic Slapstick Comedy". Yahoo! News. Archived from the original on May 15, 2024.
- Bradshaw, Peter (July 11, 2024). "Hundreds of Beavers review – Gold Rush-style spoof silent comedy fires gags at warp speed". The Guardian. Archived from the original on July 12, 2024.
- Casey, Evan (April 30, 2024). "Costumes, comedy and cabins: The Wisconsin roots of the critically acclaimed film 'Hundreds of Beavers'". Wisconsin Life. Archived from the original on May 17, 2024.
- Hanzlikova, Anna-Marie (April 2, 2024). "Hit z Festivalu otrlého diváka je druhým nejlépe hodnoceným filmem ve světě hned za Dunou! Šílenost s bobry si prý zamiluje každý". Refresher. Archived from the original on March 7, 2025.
- Coyle, Jake (November 22, 2024). "How a slapstick movie idea about beavers went from the bar to one of 2024's biggest indie hits". Associated Press. Archived from the original on November 23, 2024.
- Coyle, Jake (November 22, 2024). "What do hundreds of beavers have to do with the future of movies?". AP News. Archived from the original on February 16, 2025.
- De Semlyen, Nick (July 12, 2024). "Hundreds of Beavers Review". Empire. Archived from the original on July 12, 2024.
- DiVincenzo, Alex (February 19, 2025). "'Hundreds of Beavers' Is Bringing Slapstick Absurdity Back to VHS". Bloody Disgusting. Archived from the original on December 17, 2025.
- Dunn, Jack (May 6, 2024). "How the Slapstick, Black-and-White Movie 'Hundreds of Beavers' Took Over the Indie Scene With a $150,000 Budget, Sub-Zero Temperatures and More". Variety. Archived from the original on May 15, 2024.
- Duralde, Alonso (December 20, 2024). "Alonso Duralde's Top 11 Films of 2024". The Film Verdict. Archived from the original on May 3, 2025.
- Foreman, Alison (November 11, 2025). "Why 'Hundreds of Beavers' Star Ryland Brickson Cole Tews Will Retire After One More Movie". /Film. Archived from the original on November 13, 2025.
- Fuster, Jeremy (May 14, 2024). "Going It Alone: The Indie Filmmakers Getting Their Movies in Theaters Without a Distributor". TheWrap. Archived from the original on May 15, 2024.
- Goldrich, Robert (April 18, 2025). "Leave It To "Hundreds of Beavers"–and A Nimble Agency–To Create A Breakthrough Indie Film Campaign". Shoot. Archived from the original on April 20, 2025.
- Goodfellow, Melanie (March 11, 2025). "New Distribution Venture Cartuna X Dweck Takes North American Rights For Sundance & SXSW Thriller 'Dead Lover'". Deadline Hollywood. Archived from the original on March 12, 2025.
- Harvey, Dennis (February 17, 2024). "'Hundreds of Beavers' Review: A Singular Live-Action Cartoon of Inspired Slapstick". Variety. Archived from the original on May 15, 2024.
- Hazelton, John (July 31, 2023). "Raven Banner takes 'Hundreds Of Beavers' for international (exclusive)". Screen Daily. Archived from the original on May 17, 2024.
- Henderson, Odie (December 17, 2024). "10 great performances our film critic loved in 2024". The Boston Globe. Archived from the original on December 20, 2024.
- Henderson, Odie (December 12, 2024). "Odie Henderson's 10 best movies of 2024 (and 10 runners-up)". The Boston Globe. Archived from the original on December 13, 2024.
- Hill, Sam (September 30, 2026). "2024's funniest movie is now streaming on Dropout". Polygon. Archived from the original on September 30, 2026.
- Hornshaw, Phil (May 16, 2024). "Slapstick Comedy Movie Hundreds Of Beavers Is As Much Video Game Let's Play As Bugs Bunny Cartoon". GameSpot. Archived from the original on May 16, 2024.
- Hunter, Rob (June 14, 2025). "The 15 Best Movies Of The 2020s (So Far), Ranked". /Film. Archived from the original on June 15, 2025.
- Macaulay, Scott (July 23, 2024). "Ten Takeaways from Hundreds of Beavers' Success". Filmmaker. Archived from the original on July 24, 2024.
- Mack, Andrew (January 16, 2024). "'Hundreds of Beavers' Begins North American Theatrical Tour". ScreenAnarchy. Archived from the original on February 3, 2024.
- Naves, Mario (May 20, 2024). "Set Aside Notions About Actors in Animal Suits: 'Hundreds of Beavers' Is an Intensely Clever, Richly Textured Farce". The New York Sun. Archived from the original on May 21, 2024.
- Nicholson, Amy (December 6, 2024). "The best movies of 2024 — and where to find them". Los Angeles Times. Archived from the original on December 9, 2024.
- Piepenburg, Erik (March 5, 2024). "If You See Only One Beaver Movie This Year …". The New York Times. Archived from the original on April 20, 2024.
- Richlin, Harrison (December 18, 2024). "The 50 Best Movies of 2024, According to IndieWire's Critics Poll". IndieWire. Archived from the original on April 1, 2025.
- Richlin, Harrison (December 16, 2024). "The Best Film and TV Posters of 2024". IndieWire. Archived from the original on April 1, 2025.
- Schager, Nick (February 27, 2024). "'Hundreds of Beavers' is a Gonzo, Adult 'Looney Tunes'". The Daily Beast. Archived from the original on May 18, 2024.
- Shachat, Sarah (February 15, 2025). "At Last, 'Hundreds of Beavers' Is Ready to Rampage Through Theaters on 35MM". IndieWire. Archived from the original on February 16, 2025.
- Shachat, Sarah (December 14, 2024). "'Hundreds of Beavers' Leaned on Wooden Instruments and Amazon Prime to Craft a Slapstick Soundscape". IndieWire. Archived from the original on December 16, 2024.
- Seitz, Matt Zoller (July 30, 2024). "Hundreds of Beavers". RogerEbert.com. Archived from the original on July 30, 2024.
- Tabbara, Mona (May 30, 2024). "Fantastic Fest comedy 'Hundreds Of Beavers' scooped up for UK, Ireland, Australia and New Zealand (exclusive)". Yahoo! News. Archived from the original on May 31, 2024.
- Travis, Ben (October 21, 2024). "Empire Polls Hollywood on the Future of Cinema – From Streaming and AI, To the Best New Filmmakers". Empire. Archived from the original on November 6, 2024.
- Tropila, Jake (May 13, 2024). "Hundreds of Beavers: A Fur Trapping Photoplay of the Highest Order". Film Inquiry. Archived from the original on May 15, 2024.
- Volk, Pete (October 9, 2024). "You can now watch the funniest movie of the year for free". Polygon. Archived from the original on November 6, 2024.
- Welk, Brian (March 5, 2025). "As 'Hundreds of Beavers' Crosses $1 Million at the Box Office, Here's How It Got There". IndieWire. Archived from the original on March 7, 2025.
- Welk, Brian (November 25, 2024). "Indie Slapstick Hit 'Hundreds of Beavers' Reveals Details for Special Edition Blu-ray Release". IndieWire. Archived from the original on November 25, 2024.
- Whittaker, Richard (April 30, 2024). "Into the Wilds With Hundreds of Beavers". The Austin Chronicle. Archived from the original on May 15, 2024.

=== Web ===
- "Hundreds of Beavers (2023)". Box Office Mojo. IMDb.
- "How a Milwaukee Ad Agency Outsmarted Hollywood". Little Black Book. April 2, 2025. Archived from the original on April 3, 2025.
- "Hundreds of Beavers (SRH, 2022)". Library of Congress. Archived from the original on February 13, 2025.
- "Hundreds of Beavers". Metacritic. Fandom, Inc..
- "Hundreds of Beavers". Rotten Tomatoes. Fandango Media.
- "Seeding an International Sensation". SRH. Archived from the original on April 3, 2025.
- "Stovky bobrů". Aerofilms (in Czech). Archived from the original on November 12, 2024.
- "The Best Films of 2024". RogerEbert.com. December 10, 2024. Archived from the original on December 13, 2024.
- "Hundreds of Beavers (2023)". The Numbers. Nash Information Services, LLC.
- "Two Thumbs Up! The Individual Top Tens of 2024". RogerEbert.com. December 12, 2024. Archived from the original on December 14, 2024.
- Dillaman, Doug (June 27, 2024). "Of Mascots and Men: Mike Cheslik and Ryland Brickston Cole Tews on Hundreds of Beavers". Filmmaker. Archived from the original on February 15, 2025.
- Dillaman, Doug (June 27, 2024). "The Cold Realities: Producer Kurt Ravenwood on Hundreds of Beavers". Filmmaker. Archived from the original on December 23, 2025.
- Streussnig, Brandon; Ebiri, Bilge; Hadadi, Roxana (February 27, 2025). "And the 2025 Stunt Award Winners Are …". Vulture. Archived from the original on February 28, 2025.
- Wild, Matt (January 24, 2024). "'Hundreds Of Beavers' (the film, not the real beavers) will return to Oriental Theatre January 31". Milwaukee Record. Archived from the original on May 16, 2024.
- Winterton, Connor (September 2, 2024). "Hundreds of Beavers - Interview with Film Director Mike Cheslik". Borrowing Tape. Archived from the original on February 15, 2025.
