= Mike Cheslik =

American independent filmmaker

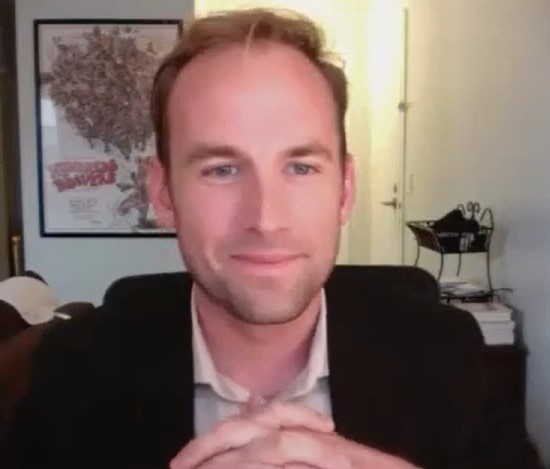
Cheslik in 2024

Mike Cheslik is an American filmmaker, editor and visual effects artist, best known for the independent features Lake Michigan Monster (2018) and Hundreds of Beavers (2022).

== Early life ==
Cheslik grew up in Wisconsin and attended Whitefish Bay High School in Whitefish Bay Wisconsin. He later studied at New York University for filmmaking and television production.

== Career ==
He has worked professionally as an animator, editor and visual effects artist.

=== L.I.P.S ===
Cheslik's directorial short film debut L.I.P.S (2016), is about "The League of Interplanetary Process Servers' finest agent attempts to deliver 30 subpoenas throughout the universe in ten minutes." With his film winning best comedy short at the Highway 61 Film Festival.

=== Lake Michigan Monster ===
Cheslik first collaborated with Ryland Brickson Cole Tews on the microbudget black-and-white film Lake Michigan Monster (2018), serving as editor and visual-effects artist (among other roles).The film's production budget was approximately $7,000 taking sixteen months to finish its production.

The film's visual effects were intensive: according to Tews, "Mike … did over 300 effects shots on the movie".

=== Hundreds of Beavers (2022) ===
In Hundreds of Beavers, Cheslik made his feature directorial debut in a largely dialogue-free slapstick comedy co-written with Tews.

The film was produced for approximately US$150,000 and shot over two Wisconsin winters. With the film grossing over $930,000 domestically and $1,500,000 worldwide. With the largest international markets being Germany, United Kingdom, and Finland.

Following its festival run, Cheslik and his team self-distributed the film, selling theatrical, Blu-ray and VOD rights independently. According to Filmmaker Magazine, the film ultimately earned more than double its production budget through this release model.Film is available to be streamed on Youtube, Tubi, Pluto TV and the Roku Channel for free with advertisements.

== Style and themes ==
Critics and interviewers have described Cheslik's style as a hybrid of silent-era slapstick and physical comedy with a strong visual effects component.Cheslik brings up in an interview that videos games were a large influence in the structure of Hundreds of Beavers.

In an interview, Cheslik said their filmmaking process involves drawing gags on notecards and building the film around these visual ideas rather than traditional scripts.

== Selected filmography ==
Year	Title	Role(s)
2018	Lake Michigan Monster	Editor, Visual Effects
2022	Hundreds of Beavers	Director, Co-writer, Editor, VFX

== Reception ==
- Hundreds of Beavers has been widely praised in the indie film press, particularly for its inventive, low-budget slapstick and visual originality.
- Cheslik's VFX work on Lake Michigan Monster has been highlighted in interviews for its creativity and volume.
