= Black and white =

Monochrome form in visual arts

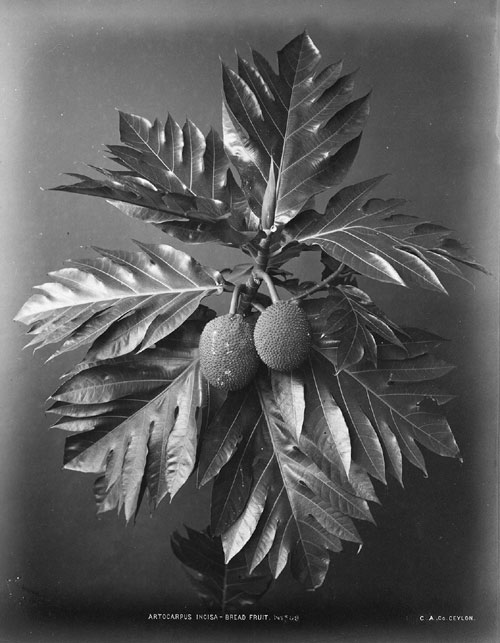
A black-and-white photo of a breadfruit plant, c. 1870

Black-and-white (B&W or B/W) or monochrome images combine black and white to produce a range of achromatic brightnesses of grey. It is also known as grayscale in technical settings.

== Media ==
The history of various visual media began with black and white, and as technology improved, color was introduced. However, there are exceptions to this rule, including black-and-white fine art photography, as well as many film motion pictures and art film(s).

Early photographs in the late 19th and early to mid 20th centuries were often developed in black and white, as an alternative to sepia due to limitations in film available at the time. Black and white was also prevalent in early television broadcasts, which were displayed by changing the intensity of monochrome phosphors on the inside of the screen, before the introduction of color from the 1950s onwards. Most television broadcasts from the 1970s were still in black and white, with many countries switching to color by mid-1970s and early 1980s.

Black and white continues to be used in certain sections of the modern arts, either stylistically to create a mood via highlighted textures, forms and shadowplay due to the absence of colour, or to invoke the perception of a historic work or setting.

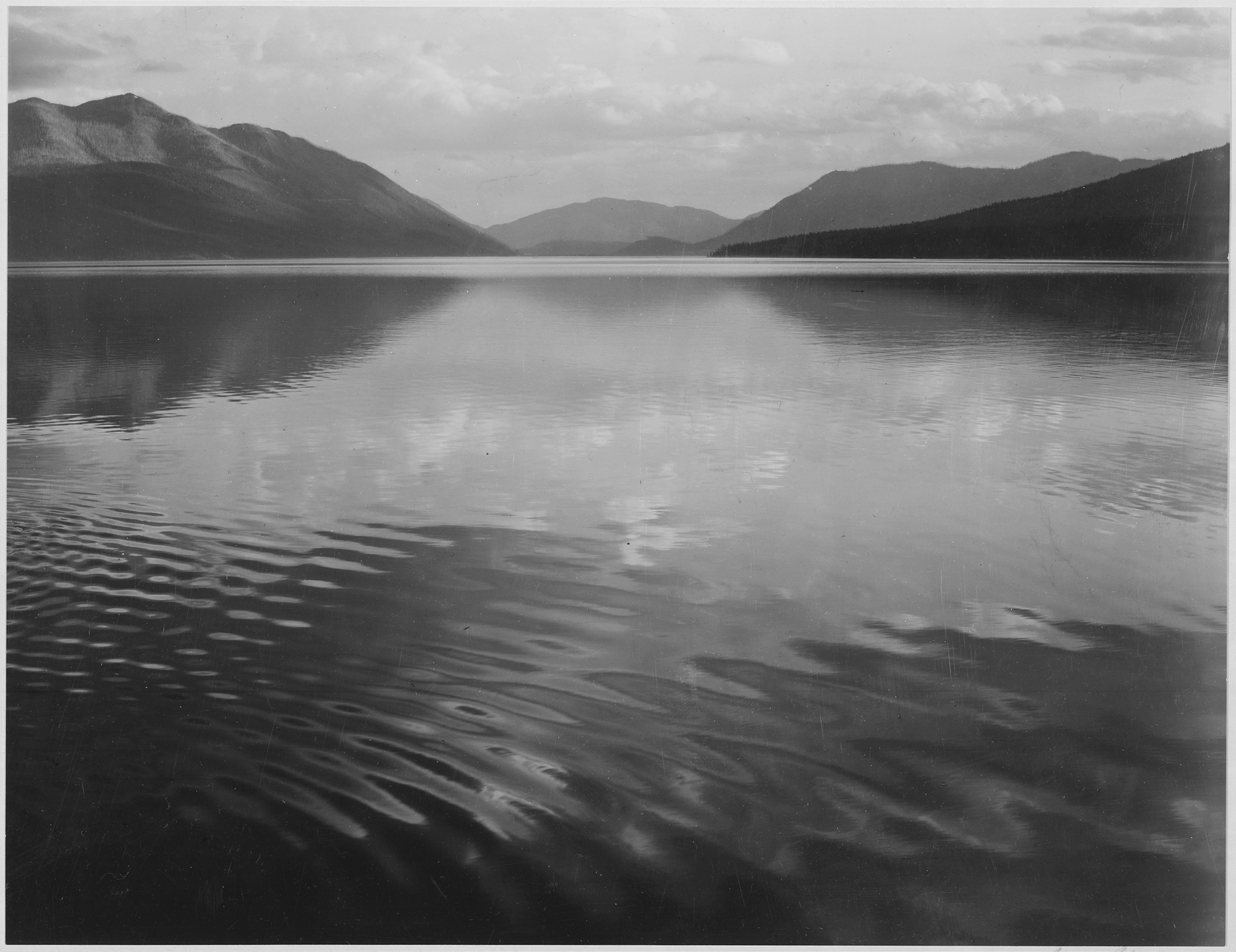
McDonald Lake, Glacier National Park, Montana – Ansel Adams – Taken between 1933 and 1942

== Contemporary use ==
Since the late 1960s, few mainstream films have been shot in black-and-white. The reasons are frequently commercial, as it is difficult to sell a film for television broadcasting if the film is not in color. 1961 was the last year in which the majority of Hollywood films were released in black and white.

Some contemporary productions have been intentionally filmed in black and white for stylistic reasons. Schindler's List (1993) was filmed primarily in black and white to make it resemble historical footage from the World War II era, and to symbolize the Holocaust itself: director Steven Spielberg explained that "the Holocaust was life without light. For me the symbol of life is color." Two limited uses of color in the film are used as part of this symbolism: the opening scene of a Shabbat blessing is initially shown in color, but fades to black and white as the flame of the candle dies. During a scene where the Kraków Ghetto is liquidated, a young girl trying to escape is singled out by her red coat; Oskar Schindler later discovers her dead body in a mass grave, still wearing the red coat. Spielberg explained that the red coat was meant to symbolize the inaction towards the Holocaust by the United States, despite the ongoing genocide being "[as] obvious as a little girl wearing a red coat, walking down the street".

The comedy film Hundreds of Beavers (2022) was similarly filmed in black and white as part of its overall homage to silent films and slapstick comedies of the era.

== Computing ==
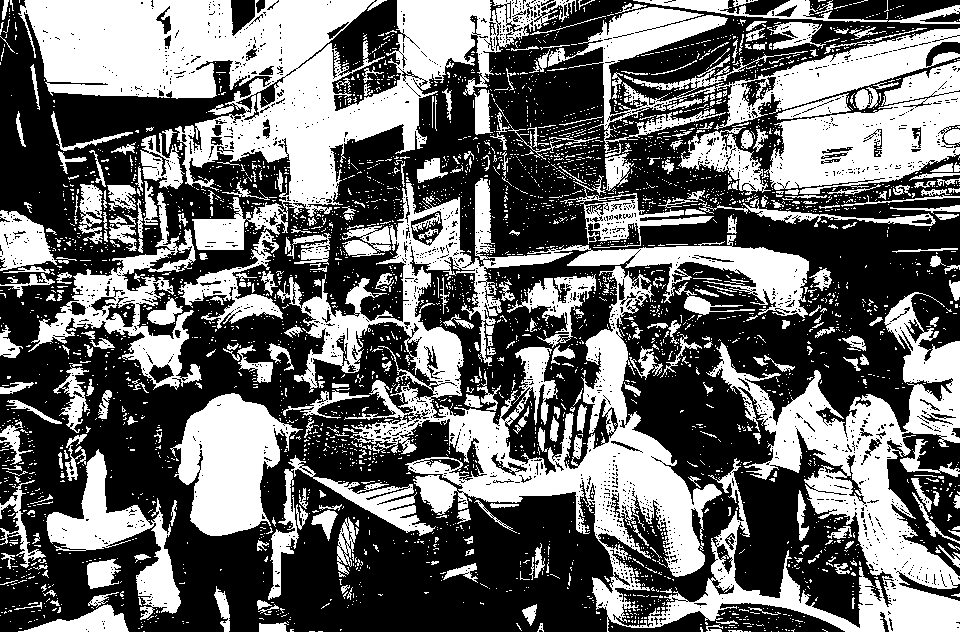
Binary image of a street in Dhaka.

In computing terminology, black-and-white is sometimes used to refer to a binary image consisting solely of pure black pixels and pure white ones; what would normally be called a black-and-white image, that is, an image containing shades of gray, is referred to in this context as grayscale.

== See also ==
- List of black-and-white films produced since 1966
- Monochromatic color
- Panchromatic film
- Selective color
