= ON Magazine =

OutNow Newsmagazine
- Editor-in-Chief: Troy May
- Frequency: Monthly, later biweekly
- Publisher: Mark Gillard
- Founded: 1992
- Final issue: 2009
- Country: United States
- Language: English
- Website: OutNowMag.com
- OCLC: 44423628

OutNow Newsmagazine, also known as ON and ON Magazine, was a monthly lifestyle magazine that targeted lesbian, gay, bisexual, and transgender (LGBT) members of the gay community in the San Francisco Bay Area. OutNow had been published since 1992 from its headquarters in San Jose, California, in the Silicon Valley.

Every month the magazine had a different content focus such as health, relationships, home improvements, weekend getaways, Pride, sports, arts and entertainment, business and more. OutNow also features interviews with politicians, business leaders and actors. OutNow had a high non-gay readership for a gay publication since it also reported on culture, business, politics and housing topics that are ignored by other local press. The publisher estimated that two-thirds of the publication's events were not LGBT-specific so anyone could find the listings useful.

Since the magazine had stories about local theater, events, politics, housing and culture, it also attracts non-LGBT readers. In online surveys conducted by the magazine, 23 percent of the readers identify as heterosexual. An electronic version of the magazine was offered on its website, along with daily news updates, blogs, feature stories on health, travel, sports and more. The calendar is the most popular section on the website, along with a business directory. As of 2004 over 5,000 copies of the online version were downloaded each month.

OutNow sponsored many community events, such as singles night at a downtown restaurant and bar, receptions at local theater performances and after work professional networking events at Silicon Valley companies. The magazine partnered with organizations such as the Silicon Valley Gay Men’s Chorus and San Jose Pride to help promote the events and magazine. The annual San Jose Pride guide was printed as part of the June edition. In 2006 they made news by refusing to print a letter from then-governor Arnold Schwarzenegger for his vetoing a pro-gay marriage bill in 2005. Many LGBT publications dropped the letter.

With more than 300 distribution sites, thousands of subscriptions and the online magazine there were an estimated 30,000 or more readers in the region that includes Silicon Valley/San Jose, San Francisco, Oakland and Santa Cruz areas.

In 2009 OutNow's subscription list was incorporated into a plotline of an LGBT thriller novel Gaph 2: The Reader by author B. Alan Bourgeois.

== History ==
The publication was founded as OutNow! in 1992 in a newspaper format. The newspaper stopped publishing due to debt in 1997. The business went through bankruptcy when publisher Mark Gillard stepped in July 1998 printing the first issue under his leadership in October 1998. Gillard changed the name removing the exclamation mark believing that the coming out process should be treated as a personal issue and not dictated by outside forces. He also converted the product to a glossy magazine and started incorporating his marketing experience into promoting the LGBT business community.

In 1998 OutNow started using its annual anniversary dinner to salute prominent people who support the LGBT community. In 2004 the publication awarded former Billy DeFrank LGBT Community Center interim Executive Director Clark Williams, a politician serving as city councilor and supervisor, its 2004 Community Leadership Award. They also honored San Jose Mayor Ron Gonzales with the 2004 Best Friend of the LGBT Community award.

In 2005 the publication was criticized by a Catholic reporter for having advertisements for bathhouses and pornographic videos, the publication was available at a national conference, National Association of Catholic Diocesan Lesbian and Gay Ministries, that met in San Jose.

In 2008 the publication ran into a form of discrimination when a non-gay-owned business refused to let the free publication be placed in their cafe. The incident was reported by the publisher in an editorial for the June Pride issue. It was picked up by the San Francisco-based Bay Area Reporter as part of a story of similar incidents faced by other LGBT publications. The magazine also relocated offices into the Billy DeFrank LGBT Community Center, also in San Jose.

In 2009 the economic climate led to ad cancellations and subsequent reduced pages of the magazine. OutNow reported that due to the state of California's budget woes they had lost major advertisers such as Santa Clara County's HIV prevention campaign, and the city of San Jose's ads aimed to getting gay people to move downtown. Another major advertiser, American Musical Theater of San Jose, went bankrupt owing thousands for previous ads. The publication lowered rates and used fewer freelancers. They also reduced the page count from 48 pages to 40. In 2009 the publication also retooled how it used its sources online. Previously issues could be downloaded but they added news stories and articles as stand alone pages that could be linked by other web sites.
