= Cahiers du Cinéma's Annual Top 10 Lists =

The following is a list of the top 10 films chosen annually by the critics of Cahiers du Cinéma, a French film magazine. The magazine started the lists in 1951, but did not publish a list from 1952 to 1953 and from 1969 to 1980 and in 2003.

== 1950s ==
#	English Title	Original Title	Director(s)	Production Country
1951
1.	The River	Le Fleuve	Jean Renoir	France
2.	Diary of a Country Priest	Journal d'un curé de campagne	Robert Bresson	France
3.	Miracle in Milan	Miracolo a Milano	Vittorio de Sica	Italy
4.	The Forgotten Ones	Los Olvidados	Luis Buñuel	Mexico
5.	All About Eve		Joseph L. Mankiewicz	United States
6.	Miss Julie	Fröken Julie	Alf Sjöberg	Sweden
7.	Story of a Love Affair	Cronaca di un amore	Michelangelo Antonioni	Italy
8.	Sunset Boulevard		Billy Wilder	United States
9.	Edward and Caroline	Édouard et Caroline	Jacques Becker	France
10.	The Flowers of St. Francis	Francesco, giullare di Dio	Roberto Rossellini	Italy
No lists from 1952 through 1953
1954
1.	This Strange Passion	Él	Luis Buñuel	Mexico
2.	Honour Among Thieves	Touchez pas au grisbi	Jacques Becker	France
3.	Knave of Hearts		René Clément	France
4.	The Wild One		László Benedek	United States
5.	Gentlemen Prefer Blondes		Howard Hawks	United States
6.	I Vitelloni		Federico Fellini	Italy
7.	It Should Happen to You		George Cukor	United States
8.	The Blue Gardenia		Fritz Lang	United States
9.	Robinson Crusoe	Aventuras de Robinson Crusoe	Luis Buñuel	Mexico
10.	Mother	おかあさん	Mikio Naruse	Japan
1955
1.	Journey to Italy	Viaggio in Italia	Roberto Rossellini	Italy
2.	Ordet		Carl Theodor Dreyer	Denmark
3.	The Big Knife		Robert Aldrich	United States
4.	Lola Montès		Max Ophüls	France
5.	Rear Window		Alfred Hitchcock	United States
6.	Bad Liaisons	Les mauvaises rencontres	Alexandre Astruc	France
7.	La Strada		Federico Fellini	Italy
8.	The Barefoot Contessa		Joseph L. Mankiewicz	United States
9.	Johnny Guitar		Nicholas Ray	United States
10.	Kiss Me Deadly		Robert Aldrich	United States
1956
1.	A Man Escaped	Un condamné à mort s'est échappé ou Le vent souffle où il veut	Robert Bresson	France
2.	Elena and Her Men	Elena et les Hommes	Jean Renoir	France
3.	Rebel Without a Cause		Nicholas Ray	United States
4.	Confidential Report		Orson Welles	United States
5.	Senso		Luchino Visconti	Italy
6.	Smiles of a Summer Night	Sommarnattens leende	Ingmar Bergman	Sweden
7.	The Swindle	Il bidone	Federico Fellini	Italy
8.	L'Amore		Roberto Rossellini	Italy
9.	Picnic		Joshua Logan	United States
10.	Fear	La Paura	Roberto Rossellini	Italy
1957
1.	A King in New York		Charlie Chaplin	United Kingdom
2.	Will Success Spoil Rock Hunter?		Frank Tashlin	United States
3.	Nights of Cabiria	Le notti di Cabiria	Federico Fellini	Italy
4.	The Wrong Man		Alfred Hitchcock	United States
5.	The Criminal Life of Archibaldo de la Cruz	Ensayo de un crimen	Luis Buñuel	Mexico
6.	Sawdust and Tinsel	Gycklarnas afton	Ingmar Bergman	Sweden
7.	Bigger Than Life		Nicholas Ray	United States
8.	The Girl Can't Help It		Frank Tashlin	United States
9.	Beyond a Reasonable Doubt		Fritz Lang	United States
10.	12 Angry Men		Sidney Lumet	United States
1958
1.	Touch of Evil		Orson Welles	United States
2.	The Seventh Seal	Det sjunde inseglet	Ingmar Bergman	Sweden
3.	White Nights	Le notti bianche	Luchino Visconti	Italy
4.	Il Grido		Michelangelo Antonioni	Italy
5.	Bonjour Tristesse		Otto Preminger	United Kingdom, United States
6.	Dreams	Kvinnodröm	Ingmar Bergman	Sweden
7.	One Life	Une vie	Alexandre Astruc	France
8.	Mon Oncle		Jacques Tati	France
9.	The Quiet American		Joseph L. Mankiewicz	United States
10.	Summer Interlude	Sommarlek	Ingmar Bergman	Sweden
1959
1.	Ugetsu	雨月物語	Kenji Mizoguchi	Japan
2.	Hiroshima mon Amour		Alain Resnais	France
3.	Ivan the Terrible (Part II)	Иван Грозный	Sergei Eisenstein	Soviet Union
4.	Pickpocket		Robert Bresson	France
5.	The 400 Blows	Les quatre cents coups	François Truffaut	France
6.	Rio Bravo		Howard Hawks	United States
7.	Wild Strawberries	Smultronstället	Ingmar Bergman	Sweden
8.	Vertigo		Alfred Hitchcock	United States
9.	Princess Yang Kwei Fei	楊貴妃	Kenji Mizoguchi	Japan
10.	The Tiger of Eschnapur	Der Tiger von Eschnapur	Fritz Lang	West Germany

== 1960s ==
#	English Title	Original Title	Director(s)	Production Country
1960
1.	Sansho the Bailiff	山椒大夫	Kenji Mizoguchi	Japan
2.	L'Avventura		Michelangelo Antonioni	Italy
3.	Breathless	À bout de souffle	Jean-Luc Godard	France
4.	Shoot the Piano Player	Tirez sur le pianiste	François Truffaut	France
5.	Poem of the Sea	Поэма о море	Alexander Dovzhenko & Yuliya Solntseva	Soviet Union
6.	Les Bonnes Femmes		Claude Chabrol	France
6.	Nazarín		Luis Buñuel	Spain, Mexico
8.	Moonfleet		Fritz Lang	United States
9.	Psycho		Alfred Hitchcock	United States
10.	The Hole	Le Trou	Jacques Becker	France
1961
1.	Lola		Jacques Demy	France
2.	A Woman Is a Woman	Une femme est une femme	Jean-Luc Godard	France
3.	Paris Belongs to Us	Paris nous appartient	Jacques Rivette	France
4.	Rocco and His Brothers	Rocco e i suoi fratelli	Luchino Visconti	Italy
5.	Shin Heike Monogatari	新・平家物語	Kenji Mizoguchi	Japan
6.	The Horse That Cried	Dorogoy tsenoy	Mark Donskoy	Soviet Union
7.	La Notte		Michelangelo Antonioni	Italy
8.	Last Year at Marienbad	L'Année dernière à Marienbad	Alain Resnais	France
9.	Elmer Gantry		Richard Brooks	United States
10.	Two Rode Together		John Ford	United States
1962
1.	My Life to Live	Vivre sa vie	Jean-Luc Godard	France
2.	Jules and Jim	Jules et Jim	François Truffaut	France
3.	Hatari!		Howard Hawks	United States
4.	Viridiana		Luis Buñuel	Mexico
5.	The Sign of Leo	Le Signe du Lion	Éric Rohmer	France
6.	Wild River		Elia Kazan	United States
7.	The Trial		Orson Welles	United States
8.	Through a Glass Darkly	Såsom i en spegel	Ingmar Bergman	Sweden
9.	The Elusive Corporal	Le Caporal épinglé	Jean Renoir	France
10.	Vanina Vanini		Roberto Rossellini	Italy
1963
1.	Contempt	Le Mépris	Jean-Luc Godard	France
2.	The Birds		Alfred Hitchcock	United States
3.	The Exterminating Angel	El ángel exterminador	Luis Buñuel	Mexico
4.	Adieu Philippine		Jacques Rozier	France
5.	The Trial of Joan of Arc	Procès de Jeanne d'Arc	Robert Bresson	France
6.	Muriel	Muriel ou le Temps d'un retour	Alain Resnais	France
7.	The Nutty Professor		Jerry Lewis	United States
8.	The Carabineers	Les Carabiniers	Jean-Luc Godard	France
9.	Salvatore Giuliano		Francesco Rosi	Italy
10.	8½	Otto e mezzo	Federico Fellini	Italy
1964
1.	Band of Outsiders	Bande à part	Jean-Luc Godard	France
2.	Gertrud		Carl Theodor Dreyer	Denmark
3.	Marnie		Alfred Hitchcock	United States
4.	A Married Woman	Une femme mariée	Jean-Luc Godard	France
5.	Man's Favorite Sport?		Howard Hawks	United States
6.	Red Desert	Il deserto rosso	Michelangelo Antonioni	Italy
7.	America America		Elia Kazan	United States
8.	The Silence	Tystnaden	Ingmar Bergman	Sweden
9.	All These Women	För att inte tala om alla dessa kvinnor	Ingmar Bergman	Sweden
10.	The Servant		Joseph Losey	United Kingdom
1965
1.	Pierrot le Fou		Jean-Luc Godard	France
2.	Sandra		Luchino Visconti	Italy
3.	Winter Light	Nattvardsgästerna	Ingmar Bergman	Sweden
4.	Six in Paris ("Gare du Nord" segment)	Paris vu par...	Jean Rouch	France
5.	Alphaville	Alphaville: une étrange aventure de Lemmy Caution	Jean-Luc Godard	France
6.	Lilith		Robert Rossen	United States
7.	Shock Corridor		Sam Fuller	United States
8.	The Family Jewels		Jerry Lewis	United States
9.	The Gospel According to St. Matthew	Il vangelo secondo Matteo	Pier Paolo Pasolini	Italy
10.	Le Bonheur		Agnès Varda	France
1966
1.	Au hasard Balthazar		Robert Bresson	France
2.	Walkover	Walkower	Jerzy Skolimowski	Poland
3.	Not Reconciled	Nicht versöhnt	Jean-Marie Straub	West Germany
4.	Masculin Féminin	Masculin féminin: 15 faits précis	Jean-Luc Godard	France
5.	The Man Who Had His Hair Cut Short	De man die zijn haar kort liet knippen	André Delvaux	Belgium
6.	7 Women		John Ford	United States
7.	The Taking of Power by Louis XIV	La prise de pouvoir par Louis XIV	Roberto Rossellini	Italy
8.	Torn Curtain		Alfred Hitchcock	United States
9.	Red Line 7000		Howard Hawks	United States
10.	Fists in the Pocket	I pugni in tasca	Marco Bellocchio	Italy
1967
1.	Persona		Ingmar Bergman	Sweden
2.	Belle de Jour		Luis Buñuel	France
3.	Weekend	Week-end	Jean-Luc Godard	France
4.	Lion Hunting with Bow and Arrow	La chasse au lion à l'arc	Jean Rouch	France
5.	Playtime		Jacques Tati	France
6.	The Big Mouth		Jerry Lewis	United States
7.	Daisies	Sedmikrásky	Vera Chytilova	Czechoslovakia
7.	The Nun	La Religieuse	Jacques Rivette	France
9.	Two or Three Things I Know About Her	Deux ou trois choses que je sais d'elle	Jean-Luc Godard	France
10.	La Chinoise	La Chinoise, ou plutôt à la Chinoise: un film en train de se faire	Jean-Luc Godard	France
1968
1.	The Chronicle of Anna Magdalena Bach	Chronik der Anna Magdalena Bach	Jean-Marie Straub & Danièle Huillet	West Germany
2.	Before the Revolution	Prima della rivoluzione	Bernardo Bertolucci	Italy
3.	The Edge		Robert Kramer	United States
4.	Spirits of the Dead ("Toby Dammit" segment)	Tre passi nel delirio	Federico Fellini	Italy
5.	Don't Let It Kill You	Il ne faut pas mourir pour ça	Jean Pierre Lefebvre	Canada
6.	The Times That Are	Le règne du jour	Pierre Perrault	Canada
7.	Barrier	Bariera	Jerzy Skolimowski	Poland
8.	Stolen Kisses	Baisers volés	François Truffaut	France
9.	Ride in the Whirlwind		Monte Hellman	United States
10.	The Bride Wore Black	La Mariée était en noir	François Truffaut	France
10.	The Smugglers	Les Contrebandières	Luc Moullet	France
No list for 1969

== 1970s ==
- No lists for the 1970s.

== 1980s ==
#	English Title	Original Title	Director(s)	Production Country
No list for 1980
1981
1.	The Aviator's Wife	La Femme de l'aviateur	Éric Rohmer	France
1.	Francisca		Manoel de Oliveira	Portugal
3.	Hotel America	Hôtel des Amériques	André Téchiné	France
3.	Tragedy of a Ridiculous Man	La tragedia di un uomo ridicolo	Bernardo Bertolucci	Italy
5.	Germany, Pale Mother	Deutschland bleiche Mutter	Helma Sanders-Brahms	West Germany
5.	The Woman Next Door	La Femme d'à côté	François Truffaut	France
7.	Stalker	Сталкер	Andrei Tarkovsky	Soviet Union
8.	Jalsaghar	জলসাঘর	Satyajit Ray	India
8.	Raging Bull		Martin Scorsese	United States
10.	Gloria		John Cassavetes	United States
10.	In girum imus nocte et consumimur igni		Guy Debord	France
10.	Palermo or Wolfsburg	Palermo oder Wolfsburg	Werner Schroeter	West Germany
10.	The Wings of the Dove	Les Ailes de la colombe	Benoît Jacquot	France
1982
1.	A Room in Town	Une chambre en ville	Jacques Demy	France
2.	Moonlighting		Jerzy Skolimowski	United Kingdom
2.	Passion		Jean-Luc Godard	France
4.	White Dog		Sam Fuller	United States
5.	The Color of Pomegranates	Նռան գույնը	Sergei Parajanov	Soviet Union
5.	Identification of a Woman	Identificazione di una donna	Michaelangelo Antonioni	Italy
5.	Le Pont du Nord		Jacques Rivette	France
8.	Parsifal		Hans-Jürgen Syberberg	West Germany
9.	Three Crowns of the Sailor	Les trois couronnes du matelot	Raúl Ruiz	France
10.	Le Beau Mariage		Éric Rohmer	France
1983
1.	À Nos Amours		Maurice Pialat	France
1.	L'Argent		Robert Bresson	France
3.	Merry Christmas, Mr. Lawrence	戦場のメリークリスマス	Nagisa Oshima	United Kingdom, Japan
3.	A Brutal Game	Un Jeu Brutal	Jean-Claude Brisseau	France
5.	The King of Comedy		Martin Scorsese	United States
5.	Pauline at the Beach	Pauline à la plage	Éric Rohmer	France
7.	L'Enfant Secret		Philippe Garrel	France
7.	Faux-Fuyants		Alain Bergala & Jean-Pierre Limosin	France
7.	Three Crowns of the Sailor	Les trois couronnes du matelot	Raúl Ruiz	France
10.	Cracking Up		Jerry Lewis	United States
10.	Fanny and Alexander	Fanny och Alexander	Ingmar Bergman	Sweden
1984
1.	Full Moon in Paris	Les nuits de la pleine lune	Éric Rohmer	France
2.	Class Relations	Klassenverhältnisse	Jean-Marie Straub & Danièle Huillet	West Germany
3.	Biquefarre		Georges Rouquier	France
3.	First Name: Carmen	Prénom Carmen	Jean-Luc Godard	France
3.	Liberté, la nuit		Philippe Garrel	France
6.	Rumble Fish		Francis Ford Coppola	United States
7.	And the Ship Sails On	E la nave va	Federico Fellini	Italy
7.	Paris, Texas		Wim Wenders	West Germany
7.	The Right Stuff		Philip Kaufman	United States
10.	Once Upon a Time in America	C'era una volta in America	Sergio Leone	Italy, United States
1985
1.	Hail Mary	Je vous salue, Marie	Jean-Luc Godard	France
2.	Détective		Jean-Luc Godard	France
3.	Year of the Dragon		Michael Cimino	United States
4.	After the Rehearsal	Efter repetitionen	Ingmar Bergman	Sweden
5.	Love Streams		John Cassavetes	United States
6.	The Home and the World	Ghare Baire	Satyajit Ray	India
7.	Les Amants terribles		Danièle Dubroux	France
8.	The Children	Les Enfants	Marguerite Duras	France
9.	Ran	乱	Akira Kurosawa	Japan
10.	Favorites of the Moon	Les Favoris de la lune	Otar Iosseliani	France
10.	Rendez-vous		André Téchiné	France
1986
1.	The Green Ray	Le Rayon vert	Éric Rohmer	France
2.	The Legend of Suram Fortress	ამბავი სურამის ციხისა	Sergei Parajanov	Soviet Union
2.	The Sacrifice	Offret	Andrei Tarkovsky	Sweden
4.	Double Messieurs		Jean-François Stévenin	France
5.	Mauvais Sang		Leos Carax	France
5.	Maine-Ocean Express	Maine Océan	Jacques Rozier	France
7.	Thérèse		Alain Cavalier	France
8.	Scene of the Crime	Le Lieu du crime	André Téchiné	France
9.	After Hours		Martin Scorsese	United States
9.	Alpine Fire	Höhenfeuer	Fredi M. Murer	Switzerland
9.	Disorder		Olivier Assayas	France
9.	Gardien de la nuit		Jean-Pierre Limosin	France
9.	Rise and Fall of a Small Cinema Company	Grandeur et décadence d'un petit commerce de cinéma	Jean-Luc Godard	France
1987
1.	Under the Sun of Satan	Sous le soleil de Satan	Maurice Pialat	France
2.	The Death of Empedocles	Der Tod des Empedokles	Jean-Marie Straub & Danièle Huillet	West Germany
2.	Intervista		Federico Fellini	Italy
2.	Wings of Desire	Der Himmel über Berlin	Wim Wenders	West Germany
5.	The Last Emperor	L'ultimo imperatore	Bernardo Bertolucci	China, United Kingdom, Italy
6.	Four Adventures of Reinette and Mirabelle	Quatre aventures de Reinette et Mirabelle	Éric Rohmer	France
6.	Full Metal Jacket		Stanley Kubrick	United Kingdom, United States
6.	Yeelen		Souleymane Cissé	Mali
9.	The Mass Is Ended	La messa è finita	Nanni Moretti	Italy
10.	Blue Velvet		David Lynch	United States
10.	The Color of Money		Martin Scorsese	United States
10.	King Lear		Jean-Luc Godard	United States
10.	A Portuguese Goodbye	Um Adeus Português	João Botelho	Portugal
10.	Wedding in Galilee	عرس الجليل	Michel Khleifi	Palestine
1988
1.	A Short Film About Killing	Krótki film o zabijaniu	Krzysztof Kieślowski	Poland
2.	The Unbearable Lightness of Being		Philip Kaufman	United States
3.	The Dead		John Huston	United States
4.	Urgences		Raymond Depardon	France
5.	Bird		Clint Eastwood	United States
6.	Landscape in the Mist	Τοπίο στην ομίχλη	Theo Angelopoulos	Greece
7.	Sound and Fury	De bruit et de fureur	Jean-Claude Brisseau	France
8.	The Last Temptation of Christ		Martin Scorsese	United States
9.	Les Innocents		André Téchiné	France
10.	Story of Women	Une affaire de femmes	Claude Chabrol	France
1989
1.	Do the Right Thing		Spike Lee	United States
1.	Red Wood Pigeon	Palombella rossa	Nanni Moretti	Italy
3.	Gang of Four	La bande des quatre	Jacques Rivette	France
3.	Dead Ringers		David Cronenberg	Canada
5.	The Cannibals	Os Canibais	Manoel de Oliveira	Portugal
5.	Yaaba		Idrissa Ouedraogo	Burkina Faso
7.	Black Rain	黒い雨	Shohei Imamura	Japan
7.	Thick Skinned	Peaux de vaches	Patricia Mazuy	France
7.	Little Vera	Маленькая Вера	Vasili Pichul	Soviet Union
10.	The Accidental Tourist		Lawrence Kasdan	United States
10.	I Want to Go Home		Alain Resnais	France
10.	Time of the Gypsies	Дом за вешање	Emir Kusturica	Yugoslavia

== 1990s ==
#	English Title	Original Title	Director(s)	Production Country
1990
1.	Freeze Die Come to Life	Замри, умри, воскресни!	Vitali Kanevsky	Soviet Union
1.	The Little Gangster	Le Petit Criminel	Jacques Doillon	France
3.	Goodfellas		Martin Scorsese	United States
3.	Nouvelle Vague		Jean-Luc Godard	France
5.	Alexandria Again and Forever	إسكندريه كمان وكمان	Youssef Chahine	Egypt
5.	Meghe Dhaka Tara	মেঘে ঢাকা তারা	Ritwik Ghatak	India
5.	No, or the Vain Glory of Command	Non, ou a Vã Glória de Mandar	Manoel de Oliveira	Portugal
8.	Crimes and Misdemeanors		Woody Allen	United States
8.	La Désenchantée		Benoît Jacquot	France
8.	Dreams	夢	Akira Kurosawa	Japan
1991
1.	Van Gogh		Maurice Pialat	France
2.	Miller's Crossing		Coen Brothers	United States
3.	Barton Fink		Coen Brothers	United States
4.	The Godfather Part III		Francis Ford Coppola	United States
5.	Close-Up	کلوزآپ ، نمای نزدیک	Abbas Kiarostami	Iran
6.	I Don't Hear the Guitar Anymore	J'entends plus la guitare	Philippe Garrel	France
7.	Edward Scissorhands		Tim Burton	United States
8.	Rhapsody in August	八月の狂詩曲	Akira Kurosawa	Japan
9.	Les Amants du Pont-Neuf		Leos Carax	France
10.	Paris Awakens	Paris s'éveille	Olivier Assayas	France
1992
1.	Unforgiven		Clint Eastwood	United States
2.	Agantuk		Satyajit Ray	India
3.	And Life Goes On	زندگی و دیگر هیچ	Abbas Kiarostami	Iran
4.	Husbands and Wives		Woody Allen	United States
5.	Border Line		Danièle Dubroux	France
5.	Savage Nights	Les Nuits Fauves	Cyril Collard	France
5.	The Sentinel	La sentinelle	Arnaud Desplechin	France
8.	La Chasse aux papillons		Otar Iosseliani	France
8.	A Tale of Winter	Conte d'hiver	Éric Rohmer	France
10.	A Brighter Summer Day	牯嶺街少年殺人事件	Edward Yang	Taiwan
10.	The House of Smiles	La casa del sorriso	Marco Ferreri	Italy
10.	Le mirage		Jean-Claude Guiguet	France
10.	The Oak	Balanța	Lucian Pintilie	Romania
1993
1.	A Perfect World		Clint Eastwood	United States
2.	Abraham's Valley	Vale Abraão	Manoel de Oliveira	Portugal
3.	The Tree, the Mayor and the Mediatheque	L'Arbre, le maire et la médiathèque	Éric Rohmer	France
4.	Smoking/No Smoking		Alain Resnais	France
5.	In the Land of the Deaf	Le Pays Des Sourds	Nicolas Philibert	France
6.	Aranyer Din Ratri	অরণ্যের দিনরাত্রি	Satyajit Ray	India
7.	Mad Dog and Glory		John McNaughton	United States
8.	Innocent Blood		John Landis	United States
9.	Bad Lieutenant		Abel Ferrara	United States
10.	Hélas pour moi		Jean-Luc Godard	France
1994
1.	Caro diario		Nanni Moretti	Italy
2.	I Can't Sleep	J'ai pas sommeil	Claire Denis	France
3.	Carlito's Way		Brian De Palma	United States
4.	Wild Reeds	Les Roseaux sauvages	André Téchiné	France
5.	The Nightmare Before Christmas		Henry Selick	United States
6.	Travolta and Me		Patricia Mazuy	France
7.	Hell	L'Enfer	Claude Chabrol	France
8.	Joan the Maid	Jeanne la pucelle	Jacques Rivette	France
9.	US Go Home		Claire Denis	France
10.	Coming to Terms with the Dead	Petits arrangements avec les morts	Pascale Ferran	France
10.	M. Butterfly		David Cronenberg	United States
1995
1.	La Cérémonie		Claude Chabrol	France
2.	Le Garçu		Maurice Pialat	France
3.	Waati		Souleymane Cissé	Mali
4.	The Bridges of Madison County		Clint Eastwood	United States
5.	Oublie-moi		Noémie Lvovsky	France
6.	The Flower of My Secret	La flor de mi secreto	Pedro Almodóvar	Spain
7.	Sonatine	ソナチネ	Takeshi Kitano	Japan
8.	Ed Wood		Tim Burton	United States
9.	Through the Olive Trees	زیر درختان زیتون	Abbas Kiarostami	Iran
10.	In the Mouth of Madness		John Carpenter	United States
1996
1.	Crash		David Cronenberg	Canada
2.	For Ever Mozart		Jean-Luc Godard	France
3.	Casino		Martin Scorsese	United States
4.	My Sex Life... or How I Got into an Argument	Comment je me suis disputé... (ma vie sexuelle)	Arnaud Desplechin	France
5.	God's Comedy	A Comédia de Deus	João César Monteiro	Portugal
6.	Dead Man		Jim Jarmusch	United States
7.	Thieves	Les Voleurs	André Téchiné	France
8.	Mission: Impossible		Brian De Palma	United States
9.	Encore		Pascal Bonitzer	France
9.	Perfect Love	Parfait amour!	Catherine Breillat	France
10.	Don't Forget You're Going to Die	N'oublie pas que tu vas mourir	Xavier Beauvois	France
1997
1.	Hana-bi		Takeshi Kitano	Japan
2.	Goodbye South, Goodbye	南國再見,南國	Hou Hsiao-hsien	Taiwan
3.	Lost Highway		David Lynch	United States
4.	The Eel	うなぎ	Shohei Imamura	Japan
4.	The River	河流	Tsai Ming-liang	Taiwan
6.	Same Old Song	On connaît la chanson	Alain Resnais	France
6.	Seventh Heaven	Le Septième Ciel	Benoît Jacquot	France
6.	Taste of Cherry	طعم گیلاس...	Abbas Kiarostami	Iran
9.	Face/Off		John Woo	United States
9.	Happy Together	春光乍洩	Wong Kar-wai	Hong Kong
9.	Scream		Wes Craven	United States
1998
1.	Flowers of Shanghai	海上花	Hou Hsiao-hsien	Taiwan
2.	Dr. Akagi	カンゾー先生	Shohei Imamura	Japan
3.	Autumn Tale	Conte d'automne	Éric Rohmer	France
3.	Midnight in the Garden of Good and Evil		Clint Eastwood	United States
5.	Anxiety	Inquietude	Manoel de Oliveira	Portugal
5.	Sue Lost in Manhattan		Amos Kollek	United States
7.	L'Ennui		Cédric Kahn	France
7.	Velvet Goldmine		Todd Haynes	United States
9.	Snake Eyes		Brian De Palma	United States
10.	Hinterland	L'arrière-pays	Jacques Nolot	France
10.	Jackie Brown		Quentin Tarantino	United States
10.	Ossos		Pedro Costa	Portugal
10.	Titanic		James Cameron	United States
1999
1.	Eyes Wide Shut		Stanley Kubrick	United States
2.	The Wind Will Carry Us	باد ما را خواهد برد	Abbas Kiarostami	Iran
3.	Sicilia!		Jean-Marie Straub & Danièle Huillet	Italy
4.	eXistenZ		David Cronenberg	Canada
5.	Night Wind	Le vent de la nuit	Philippe Garrel	France
6.	True Crime		Clint Eastwood	United States
7.	The Letter	A Carta	Manoel de Oliveira	Portugal
8.	The Straight Story		David Lynch	United States
9.	Ghost Dog: The Way of the Samurai		Jim Jarmusch	United States
10.	As Bodas de Deus		João César Monteiro	Portugal
1990s (1990–1999)
1.	The Bridges of Madison County		Clint Eastwood	United States
1.	Carlito's Way		Brian De Palma	United States
1.	Goodbye South, Goodbye	南國再見,南國	Hou Hsiao-hsien	Taiwan
4.	Close-Up	کلوزآپ ، نمای نزدیک	Abbas Kiarostami	Iran
4.	Eyes Wide Shut		Stanley Kubrick	United States
4.	Twin Peaks: Fire Walk With Me		David Lynch	United States
4.	Unforgiven		Clint Eastwood	United States
8.	Crash		David Cronenberg	Canada
8.	Edward Scissorhands		Tim Burton	United States
8.	The River	河流	Tsai Ming-liang	Taiwan

== 2000s ==
#	English Title	Original Title	Director(s)	Production Country
2000
1.	Esther Kahn		Arnaud Desplechin	France
2.	The Captive	La Captive	Chantal Akerman	Belgium
3.	Man on the Moon		Miloš Forman	United States
4.	Mission to Mars		Brian De Palma	United States
5.	In the Mood for Love	花樣年華	Wong Kar-wai	Hong Kong
6.	M/Other		Nobuhiro Suwa	Japan
7.	The Virgin Suicides		Sofia Coppola	United States
7.	Yi Yi	一一	Edward Yang	Taiwan
9.	Space Cowboys		Clint Eastwood	United States
10.	Workers for the Good Lord	Les Savates du bon Dieu	Jean-Claude Brisseau	France
2001
1.	Mulholland Drive		David Lynch	United States
2.	The Lady and the Duke	L'Anglaise et le Duc	Éric Rohmer	France
3.	Millennium Mambo	千禧曼波	Hou Hsiao-hsien	Taiwan
4.	Time and Tide	順流逆流	Tsui Hark	Hong Kong
5.	I'm Going Home	Vou Para Casa	Manoel de Oliveira	Portugal
6.	Platform	站台	Jia Zhangke	China
6.	Wild Innocence	Sauvage Innocence	Philippe Garrel	France
8.	Sobibor, October 14, 1943, 4 p.m.	Sobibor, 14 octobre 1943, 16 heures	Claude Lanzmann	France
9.	The Son's Room	La stanza del figlio	Nanni Moretti	Italy
10.	'R Xmas		Abel Ferrara	United States
2002
1.	Secret Things	Choses secrètes	Jean-Claude Brisseau	France
1.	Ten	ده	Abbas Kiarostami	Iran
3.	Blissfully Yours	สุดเสน่หา	Apichatpong Weerasethakul	Thailand
4.	From the Other Side	De l'autre côté	Chantal Akerman	Belgium
5.	The Uncertainty Principle	O Princípio da Incerteza	Manoel de Oliveira	Portugal
6.	My Mother's Smile	L'ora di religione (Il sorriso di mia madre)	Marco Bellocchio	Italy
7.	Talk to Her	Hable Con Ella	Pedro Almodóvar	Spain
8.	Spider		David Cronenberg	Canada
8.	Spirited Away	千と千尋の神隠し	Hayao Miyazaki	Japan
10.	24 (season 1)		N/A	United States
No list for 2003
2004
1.	Tropical Malady	สัตว์ประหลาด	Apichatpong Weerasethakul	Thailand
2.	S-21: The Khmer Rouge Killing Machine	S-21, la machine de mort Khmère rouge	Rithy Panh	Cambodia
2.	Tie Xi Qu: West of the Tracks	铁西区	Wang Bing	China
2.	The Village		M. Night Shyamalan	United States
5.	Shara	沙羅双樹	Naomi Kawase	Japan
6.	The Brown Bunny		Vincent Gallo	United States
6.	Gerry		Gus Van Sant	United States
6.	Kings and Queen	Rois et reine	Arnaud Desplechin	France
9.	Café Lumière	珈琲時光	Hou Hsiao-hsien	Taiwan
9.	Kill Bill: Volume 2		Quentin Tarantino	United States
9.	Saraband		Ingmar Bergman	Sweden
2005
1.	Last Days		Gus Van Sant	United States
2.	A History of Violence		David Cronenberg	Canada
2.	Regular Lovers	Les Amants réguliers	Philippe Garrel	France
4.	1/3 of the Eyes		Olivier Zabat	France
4.	Three Times	最好的時光	Hou Hsiao-hsien	Taiwan
4.	The World	世界	Jia Zhangke	China
4.	The Young Lieutenant	Le Petit Lieutenant	Xavier Beauvois	France
8.	Be with Me		Eric Khoo	Singapore
8.	Grizzly Man		Werner Herzog	United States
8.	Sin City		Frank Miller & Robert Rodriguez	United States
8.	Tale of Cinema	극장전	Hong Sang-soo	South Korea
2006
1.	Private Fears in Public Places	Cœurs	Alain Resnais	France
1.	The Sun	Сóлнце	Alexander Sokurov	Russia
3.	The Host	괴물	Bong Joon-ho	South Korea
4.	Lady Chatterley		Pascale Ferran	France
5.	A Perfect Couple	Un couple parfait	Nobuhiro Suwa	Japan, France
6.	Capote		Bennett Miller	United States
6.	These Encounters of Theirs	Quei loro incontri	Straub–Huillet	France, Italy
6.	Lady in the Water		M. Night Shyamalan	United States
9.	The Departed		Martin Scorsese	United States
10.	Flags of Our Fathers		Clint Eastwood	United States
10.	The New World		Terrence Malick	United States
2007
1.	Paranoid Park		Gus Van Sant	United States
2.	Death Proof		Quentin Tarantino	United States
2.	Inland Empire		David Lynch	United States
2.	Still Life	三峡好人	Jia Zhangke	China
5.	La France		Serge Bozon	France
5.	Zodiac		David Fincher	United States
7.	Before I Forget	Avant que j'oublie	Jacques Nolot	France
7.	Honor of the Knights	Honor de cavalleria	Albert Serra	Spain
7.	The Romance of Astrea and Celadon	Les Amours d'Astrée et de Céladon	Éric Rohmer	France
10.	The Duchess of Langeais	Ne touchez pas la hache	Jacques Rivette	France
10.	I Don't Want to Sleep Alone	黑眼圈	Tsai Ming-liang	Malaysia, Taiwan
10.	Syndromes and a Century	แสงศตวรรษ	Apichatpong Weerasethakul	Thailand
2008
1.	Redacted		Brian De Palma	United States
2.	Colossal Youth	Juventude em Marcha	Pedro Costa	Portugal
3.	Cloverfield		Matt Reeves	United States
4.	No Country for Old Men		Coen Brothers	United States
5.	Two Lovers		James Gray	United States
6.	Waltz with Bashir	ואלס עם באשיר	Ari Folman	Israel
7.	Dernier maquis		Rabah Ameur-Zaïmeche	Algeria; France
8.	Hunger		Steve McQueen	United Kingdom
9.	A Short Film About the Indio Nacional		Raya Martin	Philippines
10.	On War	De la guerre	Bertrand Bonello	France
2009
1.	Wild Grass	Les Herbes folles	Alain Resnais	France
2.	Vincere		Marco Bellocchio	Italy
3.	Inglourious Basterds		Quentin Tarantino	United States
4.	Gran Torino		Clint Eastwood	United States
5.	Eccentricities of a Blonde-Haired Girl	Singularidades de uma Rapariga Loura	Manoel de Oliveira	Portugal
6.	Tetro		Francis Ford Coppola	United States
7.	The Hurt Locker		Kathryn Bigelow	United States
8.	King of Escape	Le roi de l'évasion	Alain Guiraudie	France
9.	Tokyo Sonata	トウキョウソナタ	Kiyoshi Kurosawa	Japan
10.	Hadewijch		Bruno Dumont	France
2000s (2000–2009)
1.	Mulholland Drive		David Lynch	United States
2.	Elephant		Gus Van Sant	United States
3.	Tropical Malady	สัตว์ประหลาด	Apichatpong Weerasethakul	Thailand
4.	The Host	괴물	Bong Joon-ho	South Korea
5.	A History of Violence		David Cronenberg	Canada
6.	The Secret of the Grain	La graine et le mulet	Abdellatif Kechiche	France
7.	Tie Xi Qu: West of the Tracks	铁西区	Wang Bing	China
8.	War of the Worlds		Steven Spielberg	United States
9.	The New World		Terrence Malick	United States
10.	Ten	ده	Abbas Kiarostami	Iran

== 2010s ==
#	English Title	Original Title	Director(s)	Production Country
2010
1.	Uncle Boonmee Who Can Recall His Past Lives	ลุงบุญมีระลึกชาติ	Apichatpong Weerasethakul	Thailand
2.	Bad Lieutenant: Port of Call New Orleans		Werner Herzog	United States
3.	Film Socialisme	Socialisme	Jean-Luc Godard	France
4.	Toy Story 3		Lee Unkrich	United States
5.	Fantastic Mr. Fox		Wes Anderson	United States
6.	A Serious Man		Coen Brothers	United States
7.	To Die like a Man	Morrer Como Um Homem	João Pedro Rodrigues	Portugal
8.	The Social Network		David Fincher	United States
9.	Chouga	Shuga	Darezhan Omirbaev	Kazakhstan
10.	Mother	마더	Bong Joon-ho	South Korea
2011
1.	We Have a Pope	Habemus Papam	Nanni Moretti	Italy
2.	The Strange Case of Angelica	O Estranho Caso de Angélica	Manoel de Oliveira	Portugal
2.	The Tree of Life		Terrence Malick	United States
4.	Essential Killing		Jerzy Skolimowski	Poland
4.	Outside Satan	Hors Satan	Bruno Dumont	France
6.	A Burning Hot Summer	Un été brûlant	Philippe Garrel	France
6.	Melancholia		Lars von Trier	Denmark
8.	House of Tolerance	L'Apollonide: Souvenirs de la maison close	Bertrand Bonello	France
8.	Meek's Cutoff		Kelly Reichardt	United States
8.	Super 8		J. J. Abrams	United States
2012
1.	Holy Motors		Leos Carax	France
2.	Cosmopolis		David Cronenberg	Canada
3.	Twixt		Francis Ford Coppola	United States
4.	4:44 Last Day on Earth		Abel Ferrara	United States
5.	In Another Country	다른 나라에서	Hong Sang-soo	South Korea
6.	Take Shelter		Jeff Nichols	United States
7.	Go Go Tales		Abel Ferrara	United States
8.	Tabu		Miguel Gomes	Portugal
9.	Faust	Фауст	Alexander Sokurov	Russia
10.	Keep the Lights On		Ira Sachs	United States
2013
1.	Stranger by the Lake	L'Inconnu du lac	Alain Guiraudie	France
2.	Spring Breakers		Harmony Korine	United States
3.	Blue Is the Warmest Colour	La Vie d'Adèle – Chapitres 1 & 2	Abdellatif Kechiche	France
4.	Gravity		Alfonso Cuarón	United Kingdom, United States
5.	A Touch of Sin	天注定	Jia Zhangke	China
6.	Lincoln		Steven Spielberg	United States
7.	Jealousy	La Jalousie	Philippe Garrel	France
8.	Nobody's Daughter Haewon	누구의 딸도 아닌 해원	Hong Sang-soo	South Korea
9.	You and the Night	Les Rencontres d'après minuit	Yann Gonzalez	France
10.	Age of Panic	La Bataille de Solférino	Justine Triet	France
2014
1.	Li'l Quinquin	P'tit Quinquin	Bruno Dumont	France
2.	Goodbye to Language	Adieu au Langage	Jean-Luc Godard	France, Switzerland
3.	Under the Skin		Jonathan Glazer	United Kingdom
4.	Maps to the Stars		David Cronenberg	Canada
5.	The Wind Rises	風立ちぬ	Hayao Miyazaki	Japan
6.	Nymphomaniac		Lars von Trier	Denmark, United Kingdom
7.	Mommy		Xavier Dolan	Canada
8.	Love Is Strange		Ira Sachs	United States
9.	Paradise	Le Paradis	Alain Cavalier	France
10.	Our Sunhi	우리 선희	Hong Sang-soo	South Korea
2015
1.	Mia Madre		Nanni Moretti	France, Italy
2.	Cemetery of Splendour	รักที่ขอนแก่น	Apichatpong Weerasethakul	Thailand
3.	In the Shadow of Women	L'Ombre des femmes	Philippe Garrel	France, Switzerland
4.	The Smell of Us		Larry Clark	France
5.	Mad Max: Fury Road		George Miller	Australia, United States
6.	Jauja		Lisandro Alonso	Argentina, Denmark
7.	Inherent Vice		Paul Thomas Anderson	United States
8.	Arabian Nights	As Mil e uma Noites	Miguel Gomes	Portugal
9.	The Summer of Sangailė	Sangailės vasara	Alantė Kavaitė	Lithuania
10.	Journey to the Shore	岸辺の旅	Kiyoshi Kurosawa	Japan
2016
1.	Toni Erdmann		Maren Ade	Germany, Austria
2.	Elle		Paul Verhoeven	France
3.	The Neon Demon		Nicolas Winding Refn	Denmark, France, United States
4.	Aquarius		Kleber Mendonça Filho	Brazil
5.	Slack Bay	Ma Loute	Bruno Dumont	France
6.	Julieta		Pedro Almodóvar	Spain
7.	Staying Vertical	Rester vertical	Alain Guiraudie	France
8.	La Loi de la jungle		Antonin Peretjatko	France
9.	Carol		Todd Haynes	United States, United Kingdom
10.	The Woods Dreams Are Made of	Le Bois Dont Les Rêves Sont Faits	Claire Simon	France
2017
1.	Twin Peaks: The Return		David Lynch	United States
2.	Jeannette: The Childhood of Joan of Arc	Jeannette, l'enfance de Jeanne d'Arc	Bruno Dumont	France
3.	Certain Women		Kelly Reichardt	United States
4.	Get Out		Jordan Peele	United States
5.	The Day After	그 후	Hong Sang-Soo	South Korea
6.	Lover for a Day	L'Amant d'un jour	Philippe Garrel	France
7.	Good Time		Ben and Josh Safdie	United States
8.	Split		M. Night Shyamalan	United States
9.	Jackie		Pablo Larraín	United States, Chile, France
10.	Billy Lynn's Long Halftime Walk		Ang Lee	Taiwan, United Kingdom, United States
2018
1.	The Wild Boys	les garçons sauvages	Bertrand Mandico	France
2.	Coincoin and the Extra-Humans	Coincoin et les z'inhumains	Bruno Dumont	France
3.	Phantom Thread		Paul Thomas Anderson	United States
4.	Burning	버닝	Lee Chang-dong	South Korea
5.	Paul Sanchez est revenu!		Patricia Mazuy	France
6.	The Post		Steven Spielberg	United States
7.	On the Beach at Night Alone	밤의 해변에서 혼자	Hong Sang-Soo	South Korea
8.	The House That Jack Built		Lars von Trier	Denmark
9.	Leto	Лето	Kirill Serebrennikov	Russia
10.	Treasure Island	L'île au trésor	Guillaume Brac	France
2019
1.	The Image Book	Le Livre d'image	Jean-Luc Godard	France, Switzerland
2.	Parasite	기생충	Bong Joon-Ho	South Korea
3.	Synonyms	Synonymes	Nadav Lapid	France, Israel
4.	Bacurau		Kleber Mendonça Filho & Juliano Dornelles	Brazil
5.	Joan of Arc	Jeanne	Bruno Dumont	France
6.	Pain and Glory	Dolor y gloria	Pedro Almodóvar	Spain
7.	Les Misérables		Ladj Ly	France
8.	The Mule		Clint Eastwood	United States
9.	Joker		Todd Phillips	United States
10.	The Irishman		Martin Scorsese	United States
2010s (2010–2019)
1.	Twin Peaks: The Return		David Lynch	United States
2.	Holy Motors		Leos Carax	France
3.	Li'l Quinquin	P'tit Quinquin	Bruno Dumont	France
4.	Uncle Boonmee Who Can Recall His Past Lives	ลุงบุญมีระลึกชาติ	Apichatpong Weerasethakul	Thailand
5.	The Image Book	Le Livre d'image	Jean-Luc Godard	France, Switzerland
6.	Toni Erdmann		Maren Ade	Germany, Austria
7.	Mia Madre		Nanni Moretti	Italy
8.	Melancholia		Lars von Trier	Denmark
9.	Under the Skin		Jonathan Glazer	United Kingdom
10.	The Strange Case of Angelica	O Estranho Caso de Angélica	Manoel de Oliveira	Portugal

== 2020s ==
#	English Title	Original Title	Director(s)	Production Country
2020
1.	City Hall		Frederick Wiseman	United States
2.	The Woman Who Ran	도망친 여자	Hong Sang-soo	South Korea
3.	Uncut Gems		Benny Safdie and Joshua Safdie	United States
4.	Malmkrog		Cristi Puiu	Romania
5.	Love Affair(s)	Les Choses qu'on dit, les choses qu'on fait	Emmanuel Mouret	France
6.	Hotel by the River	강변 호텔	Hong Sang-soo	South Korea
7.	Dwelling in the Fuchun Mountains	春江水暖	Gu Xiaogang	China
8.	The Salt of Tears	Le Sel des larmes	Philippe Garrel	France, Switzerland
9.	Enormous		Sophie Letourneur	France
10.	The August Virgin	La virgen de agosto	Jonás Trueba	Spain
2021
1.	First Cow		Kelly Reichardt	United States
2.	Annette		Leos Carax	France
3.	Memoria		Apichatpong Weerasethakul	Colombia
4.	Drive My Car	ドライブ・マイ・カー	Ryusuke Hamaguchi	Japan
5.	France		Bruno Dumont	France
6.	The French Dispatch		Wes Anderson	United States
7.	All Hands on Deck	À L'abordage	Guillaume Brac	France
8.	The Girl and the Spider	Das Mädchen und die Spinne	Ramon Zürcher and Silvan Zürcher	Switzerland
9.	The Card Counter		Paul Schrader	United States
10.	Benedetta		Paul Verhoeven	France
2022
1.	Pacifiction	Pacifiction – Tourment sur les îles	Albert Serra	France, Spain, Germany, Portugal
2.	Licorice Pizza		Paul Thomas Anderson	United States, Canada
3.	Nope		Jordan Peele	United States
4.	EO	IO	Jerzy Skolimowski	Poland, Italy
5.	Wheel of Fortune and Fantasy	偶然と想像	Ryusuke Hamaguchi	Japan
6.	Saturn Bowling		Patricia Mazuy	France, Belgium
7.	Apollo 10 1/2: A Space Age Childhood		Richard Linklater	United States
8.	Introduction	인트로덕션	Hong Sang-soo	South Korea
9.	Nobody's Hero	Viens je t'emmène	Alain Guiraudie	France
10.	Who's Stopping Us	Quién lo impide	Jonás Trueba	Spain
2023
1.	Trenque Lauquen		Laura Citarella	Argentina, Germany
2.	Close Your Eyes	Cerrar los ojos	Víctor Erice	Spain, Argentina
3.	Anatomy of a Fall	Anatomie d'une chute	Justine Triet	France
4.	The Fabelmans		Steven Spielberg	United States
5.	Fallen Leaves	Kuolleet lehdet	Aki Kaurismäki	Finland, Germany
6.	Unrest		Cyril Schäublin	Switzerland
7.	Do Not Expect Too Much from the End of the World	Nu aștepta prea mult de la sfârșitul lumii	Radu Jude	Romania, Croatia, France, Luxembourg
8.	The Temple Woods Gang	Le Gang des bois du temple	Rabah Ameur-Zaïmeche	France
9.	Last Summer	L'Été dernier	Catherine Breillat	France
10.	A Prince	Un prince	Pierre Creton	France
10.	Showing Up		Kelly Reichardt	United States
2024
1.	Misericordia	Miséricorde	Alain Guiraudie	France, Spain, Portugal
2.	May December		Todd Haynes	United States
3.	In Water	물안에서	Hong Sang-soo	South Korea
4.	The Zone of Interest		Jonathan Glazer	United Kingdom, Poland, United States
5.	All We Imagine as Light	പ്രഭയായ് നിനച്ചതെല്ലം	Payal Kapadia	France, India, Netherlands, Luxembourg, Italy
6.	The Delinquents	Los delincuentes	Rodrigo Moreno	Argentina, Brazil, Chile, Luxembourg
7.	Evil Does Not Exist	悪は存在しない	Ryusuke Hamaguchi	Japan
8.	This Life of Mine	Ma vie ma gueule	Sophie Fillières	France
9.	Trap		M. Night Shyamalan	United States
10.	The Other Way Around	Volveréis	Jonás Trueba	Spain, France
2025
1.	Afternoons of Solitude	Tardes de soledad	Albert Serra	Spain, Portugal, France
2.	One Battle After Another		Paul Thomas Anderson	United States
3.	Yes!	כן!	Nadav Lapid	Israel, France, Germany, Cyprus, United Kingdom
4.	The Secret Agent	O Agente Secreto	Kleber Mendonça Filho	Brazil, France, Germany, Netherlands
5.	I Only Rest in the Storm	O Riso e a Faca	Pedro Pinho	Portugal, Brazil, France, Romania
6.	L'aventura		Sophie Letourneur	France
7.	7 Walks with Mark Brown	7 promenades avec Mark Brown	Pierre Creton and Vincent Barré	France
8.	Nouvelle Vague		Richard Linklater	France, United States
9.	Drifting Laurent	Laurent dans le vent	Anton Balekdjian, Léo Couture and Mattéo Eustachon	France
10.	Miroirs No. 3		Christian Petzold	Germany

== Filmmakers with multiple works on the lists ==
Filmmakers	Nº of Films
Jean-Luc Godard	25
Ingmar Bergman	14
Clint Eastwood	13
Éric Rohmer	12
Philippe Garrel and Manoel de Oliveira	11
David Cronenberg and Hong Sang-soo	10
Martin Scorsese and David Lynch	9
Luis Buñuel, Bruno Dumont, Federico Fellini, Alain Resnais and Apichatpong Weerasethakul	8
Alfred Hitchcock	7
Michelangelo Antonioni, Robert Bresson, Abbas Kiarostami, Nanni Moretti, Jacques Rivette, Roberto Rossellini, Jean-Marie Straub & Danièle Huillet, André Téchiné and François Truffaut	6
Brian De Palma, Alain Guiraudie, Howard Hawks, Hou Hsiao-Hsien and Jerzy Skolimowski	5
Pedro Almodóvar, Paul Thomas Anderson, Jean-Claude Brisseau, Leos Carax, Claude Chabrol, Coen Brothers, Francis Ford Coppola, Arnaud Desplechin, Abel Ferrara, Ryusuke Hamaguchi, Jia Zhangke, Fritz Lang, Jerry Lewis, Patricia Mazuy, Kenji Mizoguchi, Maurice Pialat, Satyajit Ray, Kelly Reichardt, Gus Van Sant, M. Night Shyamalan, Steven Spielberg, Quentin Tarantino and Luchino Visconti	4
Jacques Becker, Marco Bellocchio, Bernardo Bertolucci, Bong Joon Ho, Todd Haynes, Shohei Imamura, Benoît Jacquot, Akira Kurosawa, Joseph L. Mankiewicz, Kleber Mendonça Filho, Ryusuke Hamaguchi, Nicholas Ray, Jean Renoir, Albert Serra, Lars von Trier, Jonás Trueba and Orson Welles	3
Chantal Akerman, Robert Aldrich, Woody Allen, Rabah Ameur-Zaïmeche, Wes Anderson, Olivier Assayas, Alexandre Astruc, Xavier Beauvois, Catherine Breillat, Bertrand Bonello, Guillaume Brac, Tim Burton, John Cassavetes, Alain Cavalier, Souleymane Cissé, Pedro Costa, Pierre Creton, Jacques Demy, Claire Denis, Carl Theodor Dreyer, Danièle Dubroux, Pascale Ferran, David Fincher, John Ford, Sam Fuller, Jonathan Glazer, Miguel Gomes, Werner Herzog, Otar Iosseliani, Jim Jarmusch, Philip Kaufman, Elia Kazan, Abdellatif Kechiche, Takeshi Kitano, Stanley Kubrick, Kiyoshi Kurosawa, Nadav Lapid, Sophie Letourneur, Richard Linklater, Terrence Malick, Hayao Miyazaki, João César Monteiro, Jacques Nolot, Sergei Parajanov, Jordan Peele, Jean Rouch, Jacques Rozier, Raúl Ruiz, Ira Sachs, Alexander Sokurov, Nobuhiro Suwa, Andrei Tarkovsky, Frank Tashlin, Jacques Tati, Justine Triet, Tsai Ming-liang, Paul Verhoeven, Wong Kar-wai and Edward Yang	2

== See also ==
- Sight & Sound
- Empire magazine
- The Film Daily annual critics' poll
- List of films considered the best
- Vulgar auteurism
