= Marc Cholodenko =

French novelist (b.1950)

Marc Cholodenko (born 11 February 1950 in Paris), is a French novelist, translator, poet, screenwriter and dialoguist.

== Awards ==
Cholodenko won the 1976 Prix Médicis for Les États du désert. He has notably been the male dialoguist of the films by Philippe Garrel since 1988.

== Work ==
=== Poetry ===
- Parcs, Flammarion, 1972
- Le Prince, Flammarion, 1973
- Cent Chants à l’adresse de ses Frères, Flammarion, 1974
- Tombeau de Hölderlin, Hachette/Éditions P.O.L, 1979
- 2 Odes, Hachette/P.O.L, 1982
- La Tentation du trajet Rimbaud, Hachette/P.O.L, 1984
- M’éloignant M’en revenant, Sables, 1986
- La Poésie la vie, P.O.L, 1994
- Un Rêve ou un Rêve, P.O.L, 1999
- Imitation, P.O.L, 2002
- Taudis-Autels, P.O.L, 2008
- Filet, P.O.L, 2009
- Puis gris que dilue du rose que brûle le bleu, P.O.L, 2014

=== Novels ===
- Le Roi des fées, Christian Bourgois publisher, 1974
- Les États du désert (1976), Flammarion, 1976 - reprint P.O.L, 2011

Prix Médicis

- Les Pleurs, Hachette-P.O.L, 1980 - reprint P.O.L, 2014
- Meurtre, Hachette-P.O.L, 1982
- Mordechai Schamz, Hachette-P.O.L, 1984
- Histoire de Vivant Lanon, P.O.L, 1985
- Bela Jai, Salvy, 1989
- Métamorphoses, Julliard, 1991
- Quasi una fantasia, P.O.L, 1996
- Mon héros (Je ne sais pas), P.O.L, 2000
- NYC, P.O.L, 2004
- Thierry, P.O.L, 2006
- Filet, P.O.L, 2009
- Il est mort ?, P.O.L, 2016

=== Essays ===
- Deux cents et quelques commencements ou exercices d'écriture ou de lecture amusants, P.O.L, 2011

=== Translations ===
- J R (J R) novel by William Gaddis, Éditions Plon, series "Feux croisés", 1993
- L'inspectrice (The Tax Inspector) novel by Peter Carey, Plon, series "Feux croisés", 1993
- Les Mystères de Pittsburgh (The Mysteries of Pittsburgh) novel by Michael Chabon, 1994. Reprinted in 2009 in the series "Pavillons Poche" at Éditions Robert Laffont.
- La Traversée du milieu novel by V. S. Naipaul, Plon, series "Feux croisés", 1994
- Écorché vif (Skinned Alive: Stories) novel by Edmund White, Plon, series "Feux croisés", 1997

translated with Elisabeth Peellaert

- Mr. Schmidt (About Schmidt) novel by Louis Begley, Editions Grasset, 1997
- Peter Pan est mort (Death Comes for Peter Pan) novel by Joan Brady, Plon, coll. "Feux croisés", 1997
- La Symphonie des adieux (The Farewell Symphony) novel by Edmund White, Plon, series "Feux croisés", 1998
- Les vierges suicidées (The Virgin Suicides) novel by Jeffrey Eugenides, Plon, series "Feux croisés", 1998
- Les chiens-monstres (Lives of the Monster Dogs) novel by Kirsten Bakis, Plon, series "Feux croisés", 1998
- Le dernier acte (A Frolic of His Own) novel by William Gaddis, Plon, series "Feux croisés", 1999
- Le Chant, translation of the Song of Songs, Bayard, 2003

translated with Michel Berder

- Middlesex (Middlesex), novel by Jeffrey Eugenides, Éditions de l'Olivier, 2003
- Politique (Politics), novel by Adam Thirlwell, Éditions de l'Olivier, 2004
- Gothique Charpentier (Carpenter's Gothic) novel by William Gaddis, Christian Bourgois publisher, coll. « Titres », 2006

=== Screenplays and dialogues ===
- Les baisers de secours (1989) (scénario)
- J'entends plus la guitare (1991) (dialogues)
- La Naissance de l'amour (1993) (screenplay)
- Oublie-moi (1994) (screenplay)
- Le Cœur fantôme (1996) (dialogues) (screenplay)
- Le vent de la nuit (1999) (dialogues)
- L'Île au bout du monde (1999) (screenplay)
- Wild Innocence (2001) (dialogues)
- Regular Lovers (2005) (collaboration to the screenplay)
- Frontier of the Dawn (2008) (screenplay)
- A Burning Hot Summer (2011) (collaboration to the screenplay)
- Jealousy (2013) (collaboration to the screenplay)
