= Clotilde Hesme =

French actress (born 1979)

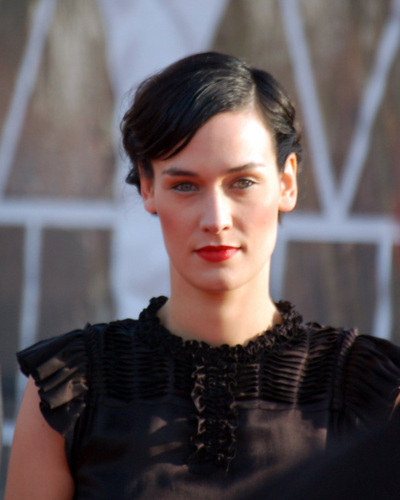
- Hesme at the 2008 Cannes Film Festival
- Born: 30 July 1979 (age 46); Troyes, Aube, France
- Occupation: Actress
- Years active: 1999–present

Clotilde Hesme (French: [klɔtild ɛːm]; born 30 July 1979) is a French actress known for playing Lilie in Philippe Garrel's Regular Lovers and Alice in Christophe Honoré's Love Songs. She is also known for the role of Adèle from the TV series Les Revenants.

== Early life ==
Clotilde Hesme was born in Troyes, Aube, a city in the interior of France. Her parents were civil servants and her sisters Annelise Hesme and Élodie Hesme are also actresses.

She studied at the Conservatoire National Supérieur d'Art Dramatique (CNSAD) in Paris, during this time she made several plays. Her first work out of the theater was at the 1999 short film Dieu, que la nature est bien faite!. While she was acting on a play in Paris she was noticed by Jérôme Bonnel, who cast her in his film Le Chignon d'Olga in 2002. Clotilde stands 1.78 m (5 feet 10 inches) tall.

== Career ==
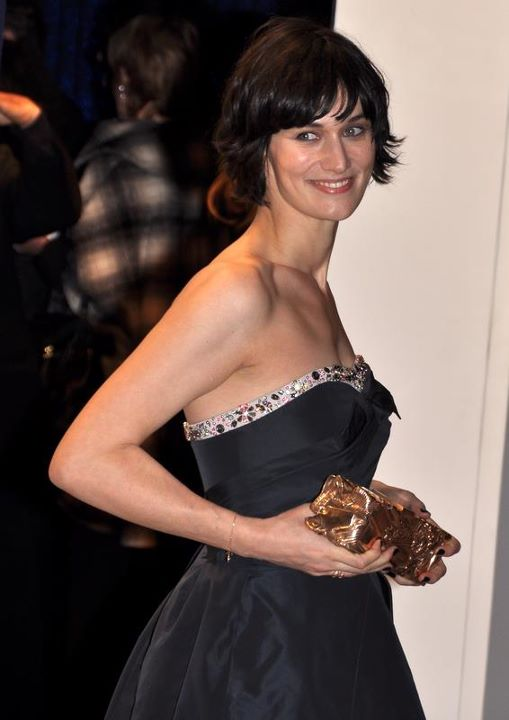
Hesme at the 2012 César Awards ceremony

At the beginning of her career she was cast in some supporting roles, as in Le Chignon d'Olga, Focus and À ce soir , and she remained acting in French plays.

In 2005 she starred alongside Louis Garrel in Philippe Garrel's Regular Lovers, it was her first main role at the cinema. After the film she starred the short film Comment on freine dans une descente? in 2006.

In 2007 she starred for the second time a film with Louis Garrel, in this time Christophe Honoré's Love Songs, a role that earned her the 2008 SACD Awards for Female Revelation and a César Awards nomination for Most Promising Actress. Also in 2008 she was nominated for a Molière Award for her performance in Marivaux's La Seconde Surprise de l'amour.

In 2009 she made an appearance in Christophe Honoré's The Beautiful Person. In 2010 she appeared in one of the main roles of the Portuguese film, directed by the Chilean Raúl Ruiz in his last work, Mysteries of Lisbon alongside an international cast.

In 2011 starred the French film Angèle et Tony and won for the role of Angèle a César Award for Most Promising Actress. In 2012 starred Three Worlds directed by Catherine Corsini, the film competed in the Un Certain Regard section at the 2012 Cannes Film Festival.

Also in 2012 she starred in Les Revenants, a TV series that is considered an international success by critics and audiences.

== Filmography ==
Year	Title	Role	Notes
1999	Dieu, que la nature est bien faite!	Copine	Short
2002	Le Chignon d'Olga	Marion	
2004	Focus	Lucie	
2004	À ce soir	Mathilde	Short film
2005	Regular Lovers	Lilie	
2006	Comment on freine dans une descente?	Nadine	Short film
2007	Love Songs	Alice	SACD Awards for Female Revelation; Nominated—César Award for Most Promising Actress; Nominated—Lumière Award for Best Female Revelation; Nominated—2008 Etoiles d'Or de la Presse du Cinéma Français for Most Promising Actress
2007	La paire de chaussures	Gabrielle	
2007	Le Fils de l'épicier	Claire	
2007	24 mesures	Damia	
2007	Enfances	Gabrielle	
2008	The Beautiful Person	Mme. de Tournon	
2008	De la guerre	Louise	
2008	Rivals	Corinne	
2009	La seconde surprise de l'amour	La marquise	
2009	Angelo, tyran de Padoue	Tisbé	
2009	Les derniers jours du monde	Iris	
2009	Suite noire	Rebecca	
2010	Mysteries of Lisbon	Elisa de Montfort	
2011	Angel & Tony	Angèle	César Award for Most Promising Actress; Nominated—Lumière Award for Best Actress
2012	Three Worlds	Juliette	
2012	The Returned	Adèle	TV series
2013	La collection – Ecrire pour... le jeu des sept familles	Anna	
2014	Pour une femme	Madeleine	
2014	Le souffleur de l'Affaire	Sarah Bernhardt	
2014	Promeneuse		Short film
2014	The Last Hammer Blow	Nadia	Marrakech International Film Festival Award for Best Actress
2015	Eva & Leon	Eva	
2016	Chocolat	Marie	
2016	A Woman's Life	Gilberte de Fourville	
2017	Diane a les épaules	Diane	
2021	Lupin	Juliette Pellegrini	Netflix series
