= Saïd Ben Saïd =

French film producer

- Born: 11 July 1966 (age 59); Tunis, Tunisia
- Occupation: Film producer
- Years active: 1996–present

Saïd Ben Saïd (born 11 July 1966) is a Tunisian-French film producer.

== Biography ==
He grew up in Carthage and became passionate about cinema, to the point of bringing VHS tapes from France with the help of a diplomatic friend of his parents. He came to Paris in 1984 to do his higher studies at Lycée privé Sainte-Geneviève in Versailles and then at ESTP. He then worked as an engineer at Lyonnaise des Eaux and then at M6.

In 1996, he joined UGC, producing films by André Téchiné, Barbet Schroeder, Pascal Bonitzer and Alain Corneau. In 2010, he founded his own company, SBS Productions and produced films by Roman Polanski - Carnage (2011), Brian De Palma - Passion (2012), Philippe Garrel - Jealousy (2013), David Cronenberg - Maps to the Stars (2014), Walter Hill - The Assignment (2016) and Paul Verhoeven - Elle (2016) & Benedetta (2021).

In 2009, he signed a petition in support of Roman Polanski, calling for his release after Polanski was arrested in Switzerland in relation to his 1977 charge for drugging and raping a 13-year-old girl.

== Partial filmography ==
- Loin (2001)
- Ruby & Quentin (2003)
- Les Dalton (2004)
- Black Sun (2005)
- The Witnesses (2007)
- Le Tueur (2007)
- The Great Alibi (2008)
- Inju: The Beast in the Shadow (2008)
- The Girl on the Train (2009)
- Lucky Luke (2009)
- Love Crime (2010)
- Carnage (2011)
- Unforgivable (2011)
- Looking for Hortense (2012)
- Passion (2012)
- A Castle in Italy (2013)
- Jealousy (2013)
- Maps to the Stars (2014)
- Valentin Valentin (2015)
- In the Shadow of Women (2015)
- Elle (2016)
- Aquarius (2016)
- Tout de suite maintenant (2016)
- The Assignment (2016)
- Lover for a Day (2017)
- Synonyms (2019)
- Frankie (2019)
- Bacurau (2019)
- Benedetta (2021)
- Passages (2023)
- Last Summer (2023)
- Auction (2024)
- The Shrouds (2024)
- Maigret and the Dead Lover (2026)
- The Man I Love (2026)

=== Unfilmed projects ===
- The Keep (dir.: Peter Weir)
- Magic Hour (dir.: Brian De Palma)
- The Man with Kaleidoscope Eyes (dir.: Joe Dante)
- Blackbird (dir.: David Mamet)
- Lyon 1943 (dir.: Paul Verhoeven)
- Predator (dir.: Brian De Palma)
- Bel-Ami (dir.: Paul Verhoeven)
- Sans Compter (dir.: Paul Verhoeven)
