= The Plough (film) =

2023 film by Philippe Garrel

- Theatrical release poster
- French: Le Grand Chariot
- Directed by: Philippe Garrel
- Written by: Philippe Garrel; Jean-Claude Carrière; Arlette Langmann; Caroline Deruas Peano
- Produced by: Laurine Pelassy; Edouard Weil
- Starring: Louis Garrel; Damien Mongin; Esther Garrel; Lena Garrel; Aurélien Recoing; Francine Bergé; Asma Messaoudene; Mathilde Weil
- Cinematography: Renato Berta
- Edited by: Yann Dedet
- Music by: Jean-Louis Aubert
- Production companies: Rectangle Productions; Close Up Films; Arte France Cinéma; Radio Télévision Suisse; Tournon Films
- Distributed by: Ad Vitam; Wild Bunch
- Release dates: 21 February 2023 (Berlinale); 14 September 2023 (France)
- Running time: 95 minutes
- Countries: France; Switzerland
- Language: French

The Plough (French: Le Grand Chariot) is a 2023 drama film co-written and directed by Philippe Garrel. Starring Louis Garrel, Damien Mongin, Esther Garrel, Lena Garrel and Francine Bergé, it depicts the story of romantic and tragic destiny of a family of puppeteer artists. It competed for the Golden Bear at the 73rd Berlin International Film Festival, where it had its world premiere on 21 February 2023. It was released theatrically in France on 14 September 2023.

== Synopsis ==
A traveling puppet theater is legacy of three siblings, father and grandmother. When the father dies during a performance, the remaining family members keep the show running and try to keep legacy alive.

== Cast ==
- Louis Garrel as Louis
- Damien Mongin as Pieter
- Esther Garrel as Martha
- Lena Garrel as Lena
- Aurélien Recoing as father
- Francine Bergé as grandmother
- Asma Messaoudene as Laura
- Mathilde Weil as Helene

== Production ==
=== Development ===
In director's statement Philippe Garrel said, "I wanted to make a film with my three children, since my children are aged 22, 30 and 38, I had to find a reason to bring them together at those ages." His father Maurice Garrel was a puppeteer in Gaston Baty’s troupe along with his godfather, Alain Recoing. So, he decided to depict a family of puppeteers and wrote the screenplay with Jean-Claude Carrière, Arlette Langmann and Caroline Deruas Peano. In March 2022, CNC released funds for the film.

=== Casting ===
Besides Louis Garrel, Esther Garrel, and Lena Garrel in the roles of the siblings Louis, Martha and Lena, Francine Bergé as the grandmother, Alain Recoing's son Aurélien Recoing as the father, Damien Mongin as Pieter, Mathilde Weil as Hélène and Asma Messaoudene as Laura were cast. Renato Berta shot the film in black and white and the scenery was created by Manu de Chauvigny. Jean-Louis Aubert, like Philippe Garrel's previous films composed the music of The Plough.

== Release ==
The Plough had its world premiere on 21 February 2023 as part of the 73rd Berlin International Film Festival, in competition. It was released theatrically in France on 13 September 2023. It was invited at the 28th Busan International Film Festival in 'Icon' section and was screened on 6 October 2023.

== Reception ==
On the review aggregator Rotten Tomatoes website, the film has an approval rating of 50% based on 10 reviews, with an average rating of 4.8/10.

Jordan Mintzer of The Hollywood Reporter calling the film "Intimately familiar" wrote, "A minor if somewhat memorable work by a director who has left his mark not only on his own children, but on a brand of filmmaking that may disappear along with him." Fabien Lemercier reviewing for Cineuropa praised the film and wrote, "It’s a perfect portrait beneath a modest surface, which pulls back the curtain on the universe of those pulling puppets’ strings in the world of fiction, folk who are more than familiar with the ups and downs of life." Jonathan Romney for ScreenDaily wrote in review that the film is "You’d have to be a committed Garrelian, or a hardline upholder of the prerogatives of French auteurism, to really appreciate a glum piece which feels like a relic of a European cinema that is no longer really attuned to the times."

== Accolades ==
Award	Date	Category	Recipient	Result	Ref.
Berlin International Film Festival	25 February 2023	Golden Bear	Philippe Garrel	Nominated	
Berlin International Film Festival	25 February 2023	Silver Bear for Best Director	Philippe Garrel	Won	
