= Frontier of the Dawn =

- Original French poster
- French: La Frontière de l'aube
- Directed by: Philippe Garrel
- Written by: Marc Cholodenko; Arlette Langmann
- Produced by: Edouard Weil
- Starring: Louis Garrel; Laura Smet; Clémentine Poidatz
- Cinematography: William Lubtchansky
- Edited by: Yann Dedet
- Music by: Jean-Claude Vannier
- Distributed by: Les Films du Losange
- Release dates: 22 May 2008 (Cannes); 8 October 2008 (France)
- Running time: 106 minutes
- Country: France
- Language: French
- Box office: $242,000

Frontier of the Dawn also Frontier of Dawn (French: La Frontière de l'aube [la fʁɔ̃tjɛʁ də lob]) is a 2008 French drama film directed by Philippe Garrel. It stars Louis Garrel, Laura Smet, and Clémentine Poidatz. It tells the story of a photographer who is haunted by the ghost of his dead lover. It was screened at the 2008 Cannes Film Festival in competition. It was released in France on 8 October 2008.

== Plot ==
François, a handsome young photographer who has been commissioned to take pictures of Carole, an actress, calls at her apartment when she is lunching with friends. Next day she books a hotel room for a photo shoot and seduces him. Her husband is on a long assignment in Hollywood and the two have an intense affair, ending at dawn one day when the husband arrives back early.

While François keeps his distance and gets on with his work, Carole pines for him. She drinks when alone, sets her apartment on fire, and is confined in a psychiatric hospital. When eventually released, all she wants is François, but he has met Ève, a more balanced young woman who falls pregnant almost immediately. Going back to the bottle, Carole ends up dead.

Though Ève's father is all in favour of her marrying and is willing to support the young couple, François is haunted by his lost passion for Carole and guilt over her death. She comes to him in dreams and then starts appearing when he looks in a mirror, asking him to join her. As he is dressing for his wedding, he jumps from the window to his death.

== Cast ==
- Louis Garrel as François
- Laura Smet as Carole
- Clémentine Poidatz as Ève
- Olivier Massart as Ève's father
- Jérôme Robart as François' friend
- Emmanuel Broche as François' friend
- Cédric Vieira as François' friend
- Grégory Gadebois as Carole's friend
- Vladislav Galard as Carole's friend
- Julie Pouillon as Carole's friend

== Release ==
The film had its world premiere in the Competition section at the 2008 Cannes Film Festival on 22 May 2008. It was released in France on 8 October 2008.

== Reception ==
On review aggregation website Rotten Tomatoes, the film holds an approval rating of 50% based on 6 reviews, and an average rating of 6.1/10.

Aaron Cutler of Slant Magazine wrote: "At times Frontier feels more like homage than like a film in its own right, but if its goal is to pay tribute to the dead, lost, and forgotten, then a reheated quality may be precisely the point." Karina Longworth of IndieWire wrote: "Hands down the most accessible Garrel film I've seen, it's still a strange, swoony, genre-bending challenge."

Writing for The New Yorker, Richard Brody listed it as one of the best films of 2009.
