= In the Shadow of Women =

2015 film by Philippe Garrel

- Theatrical release poster
- French: L'Ombre des femmes
- Directed by: Philippe Garrel
- Written by: Jean-Claude Carrière; Caroline Deruas-Garrel; Arlette Langmann; Philippe Garrel
- Produced by: Saïd Ben Saïd; Michel Merkt
- Starring: Clotilde Courau; Stanislas Merhar; Lena Paugam; Vimala Pons; Antoinette Moya; Jean Pommier; Thérèse Quentin; Mounir Margoum
- Cinematography: Renato Berta
- Edited by: François Gédigier
- Music by: Jean-Louis Aubert
- Production companies: SBS Productions; Close Up Films; Arte France Cinéma; Radio Télévision Suisse
- Distributed by: SBS Distribution (France); Adok Films (Switzerland)
- Release dates: 14 May 2015 (Cannes); 27 May 2015 (France); 3 June 2015 (French-speaking Switzerland)
- Running time: 73 minutes
- Countries: France; Switzerland
- Language: French
- Budget: €2.4 million
- Box office: $152,802

In the Shadow of Women (French: L'Ombre des femmes) is a 2015 drama film co-written and directed by Philippe Garrel, starring Clotilde Courau, Stanislas Merhar and Lena Paugam. It is the second installment in Garrel's “trilogy of love”, the first being Jealousy (2013) and the third being Lover for a Day (2017). The film was selected to open the Directors' Fortnight section of the 2015 Cannes Film Festival.

== Synopsis ==
Pierre, a filmmaker, is working on a documentary film about the French Resistance. He is married to Manon. However, he encounters Elisabeth, an intern at a film archive, and has an affair with her.

== Cast ==
- Clotilde Courau as Manon
- Stanislas Merhar as Pierre
- Lena Paugam as Elisabeth
- Vimala Pons as Lisa
- Mounir Margoum as Manon's lover
- Jean Pommier as Henri
- Thérèse Quentin as Henri's wife
- Antoinette Moya as Manon's mother
- Louis Garrel as the narrator

== Release ==
In the Shadow of Women had its world premiere as the opening film of the Directors' Fortnight section of the 2015 Cannes Film Festival on 14 May. The film was released in France on 27 May 2015 by SBS Distribution. It was released by Adok Films in French-speaking Switzerland on 3 June 2015 and in German-speaking Switzerland on 4 August 2016.

== Reception ==
=== Critical response ===
On the review aggregator website Rotten Tomatoes, the film holds an approval rating of 87% based on 38 reviews, with an average score of 7.4/10. On Metacritic, the film received an average score of 74, based on 14 reviews, indicating "generally favorable reviews".

Eric Kohn of IndieWire gave the film a grade of B−, saying, "with its luscious 35mm photography and playful depiction of passionate lovers reaching a breaking point, the swift 72-minute drama delivers a satisfying riff on moody, intimate material Garrel has mined to richer effect many times before." Scott Foundas of Variety described it as "a tightly focused romantic drama that exudes the narrative terseness of a good short story and the lucid craftsmanship of a filmmaker in full command of the medium."

Cahiers du cinéma ranked it as the third best film of 2015.

=== Accolades ===
Award	Year of ceremony	Category	Recipient(s)	Result	Ref(s)
Louis Delluc Prize	2015	Best Film	In the Shadow of Women	Nominated	
Lumière Awards	2016	Best Director	Philippe Garrel	Nominated	
Lumière Awards	2016	Best Actress	Clotilde Courau	Nominated	
