= The Beautiful Person =

2008 film by Christophe Honoré

- Theatrical release poster
- French: La Belle Personne
- Directed by: Christophe Honoré
- Screenplay by: Christophe Honoré; Gilles Taurand
- Based on: La Princesse de Clèves by Madame de La Fayette
- Produced by: Florence Dormoy; Joëy Faré
- Starring: Louis Garrel; Léa Seydoux; Grégoire Leprince-Ringuet; Esteban Carvajal Alegria; Agathe Bonitzer; Simon Truxillo; Anaïs Demoustier; Jacob Lyon; Tanel Derard; Martin Simeon; Jeanne Audiard; Esther Garrel; Valérie Lang; Jean-Michel Portal; Clotilde Hesme
- Cinematography: Laurent Brunet
- Edited by: Chantal Hymans
- Music by: Alex Beaupain
- Production companies: Arte France; Scarlett Production
- Distributed by: Le Pacte
- Release dates: 10 September 2008 (San Sebastián); 12 September 2008 (France)
- Running time: 90 minutes
- Country: France
- Language: French
- Box office: $748,217

The Beautiful Person (French: La Belle Personne) is a 2008 French teen comedy-drama film directed by Christophe Honoré from a screenplay he co-wrote with Gilles Taurand. It is a modernised adaptation of the 1678 French novel La Princesse de Clèves. Honoré was inspired to make the film after then-French president Nicolas Sarkozy repeatedly criticised the book as irrelevant in regard to modern life.

Originally intended as a television film, The Beautiful Person aired on Arte on 12 September 2008, ahead of its theatrical release in France on 17 September.

== Plot ==
Following the death of her mother, 16-year-old Junie transfers to the school that her cousin Mathias attends. She instantly attracts the attention of several of her new classmates, especially the shy, sensitive Otto. In Italian class, a record of Maria Callas singing Lucia plays, which causes Junie to rush out crying, leaving her belongings behind. The teacher, Nemours, sees a photo of her taken by another student and swipes it. Afterwards, Nemours pursues her, even though she has mixed feelings about it. He is so enamored by her that he breaks off his relationships with Florence Perrin, a teacher, and Marie, a student.

Nemours switches seats with Mathias during a field trip. Marie finds a letter left on the seat and it spreads throughout the student body. This letter is a love letter that all of the students think was written by Nemours. Junie, upon reading the letter, becomes very upset, believing that Nemours is in love with somebody else. Mathias goes to Nemours and explains that it was his letter from another boy named Martin and asked him to say that it belonged to the teacher.

One of Otto's friends from the Russian-language class is asked to spy on Junie after she acts cold to Otto and sees Nemours acting tender to Junie. He mistakes it for kissing and Otto confronts Junie about the misunderstanding. She denies it and goes home. Otto kills himself the next day by jumping from a very high floor at school. After Otto's suicide, Junie skips school for three weeks, coming only after Nemours tells Mathias that he will be taking sick leave until the end of the semester.

Nemours follows Junie around and she decides to approach him. He asks for some time to talk to her and they are seen running around the city like children. He takes her back to his room where she starts talking about love. He takes her home where they arrange a date for 5pm the following day. Nemours waits until seven, then calls Mathias. Mathias comes down and tells Nemours that Junie left the previous day, and he is not allowed to say where and to forget about her. Junie also said she never wanted to see Nemours again. Junie is seen on a ship departing for somewhere else.

== Cast ==
In parentheses are the corresponding characters from La Princesse de Clèves, and where appropriate the historical originals.

- Léa Seydoux as Junie de Chartres (The Princess de Clèves)
- Louis Garrel as Jacques Nemours (The Duke de Nemours)
- Grégoire Leprince-Ringuet as Otto Clèves (The Prince de Clèves)
- Esteban Carvajal Alegria as Matthias de Chartres (The Vidame de Chartres)
- Agathe Bonitzer as Marie Valois (Mary, Queen of Scots married to the Dauphin of France)
- Simon Truxillo as Henri Valois (King Henri II)
- Anaïs Demoustier as Catherine (Queen Catherine de Médicis)
- Jacob Lyon as Jacob (the Knight de Guise)
- Tanel Derard as Tanel
- Martin Simeon as Martin
- Jeanne Audiard as Jeanne
- Esther Garrel as Esther
- Valérie Lang as Florence Perrin, a History teacher and ex-lover of Nemours
- Jean-Michel Portal as Estouteville, a Math teacher (Estouteville)
- Chantal Neuwirth as Nicole, hostess of the café Sully
- Dominic Gould as English teacher
- Alice Butaud as Russian teacher
- Clotilde Hesme as Mme. de Tournon, a librarian (Mme. de Tournon)
- Matilde Incerti as French teacher
- Chiara Mastroianni as girl in the café Sully (Mastroianni played the Princess de Clèves in The Letter)
- Gabriel Attal as student

== Accolades ==
Award / Film Festival	Category	Recipients and nominees	Result
César Awards	Most Promising Actor	Grégoire Leprince-Ringuet	Nominated
César Awards	Most Promising Actress	Léa Seydoux	Nominated
César Awards	Best Adaptation	Christophe Honoré and Gilles Taurand	Nominated
Festival International du Film Francophone de Namur	Best Actress	Léa Seydoux	Won
Lumière Awards	Most Promising Actress	Léa Seydoux	Nominated
Prix Jacques Prévert du Scénario	Best Adaptation	Christophe Honoré and Gilles Taurand	Nominated
