= Maurice Garrel =

French actor (1923–2011)

- Born: 24 February 1923; Saint-Servais, Isère, France
- Died: 4 June 2011 (aged 88); Paris, France
- Occupation: Actor
- Years active: 1957–2011
- Children: 2, including Philippe Garrel
- Relatives: Louis Garrel (grandson); Esther Garrel (granddaughter)

Maurice Garrel (24 February 1923 – 4 June 2011) was a French film actor.

Garrel was born in Saint-Servais, Isère. He appeared in over a hundred films and was nominated twice for a César Award for best supporting actor: in 1991 for La Discrète and in 2005 for Kings and Queen.

Garrel was the father of producer Thierry Garrel and director Philippe Garrel, and the grandfather of actor Louis Garrel and actress Esther Garrel.

Garrel died in Paris, aged 88.

== Selected filmography ==
- The Gorillas (1964)
- Black Sun (1966)
- To Commit a Murder (1967)
- The Young Wolves (1968)
- The Mad Heart (1970)
- The Inheritor (1973)
- Liberté, la nuit (1984)
- A Heart in Winter (1992)
- Wild Innocence (2001)
- His Brother (2003)
- Regular Lovers (2005)
- A Burning Hot Summer (2011)
