= The Assignment (2016 film) =

- Theatrical release poster
- Directed by: Walter Hill
- Screenplay by: Walter Hill; Denis Hamill
- Story by: Denis Hamill; Walter Hill
- Produced by: Harvey Kahn; Saïd Ben Saïd; Michel Merkt
- Starring: Michelle Rodriguez; Tony Shalhoub; Anthony LaPaglia; Caitlin Gerard; Sigourney Weaver
- Cinematography: James Liston
- Edited by: Philip Norden
- Music by: Giorgio Moroder; Raney Shockne
- Production company: SBS Films
- Distributed by: Saban Films
- Release dates: September 11, 2016 (TIFF); March 3, 2017 (United States)
- Running time: 105 minutes
- Countries: Canada; France; United States
- Language: English
- Budget: <$3 million
- Box office: $388,789

The Assignment (also known as Tomboy, Revenger (in Australia) and formerly known as (Re) Assignment and Tomboy: A Revenger's Tale) is an action crime thriller film directed by Walter Hill and co-written by Hill and Denis Hamill. The film stars Michelle Rodriguez, Tony Shalhoub, Anthony LaPaglia, Caitlin Gerard, and Sigourney Weaver. The film had its world premiere at the Toronto International Film Festival on September 11, 2016. It was released on March 3, 2017, through video on demand, prior to a limited release on April 7, 2017, by Saban Films.

== Plot ==
Dr. Rachel Jane is a rogue plastic surgeon with a twisted vision of a better world. After losing her medical license, she began an illegal practice and performed unwanted surgical experiments on impoverished homeless people. The film is split between a present-day timeframe in which she has been institutionalized and her condition is being assessed by Dr. Ralph Galen, and a second timeframe two years into the past.

Three years prior, Jane's brother Sebastian was murdered by professional killer Frank Kitchen. After discovering Frank's identity, Dr. Jane hires Honest John Baconian to double-cross him. Seeking revenge, but also seeing an opportunity to assess how much physical identity matters, Jane performs gender reassignment surgery on Frank and makes him physically female.

Horrified by his new appearance, Frank has a mental breakdown. Finding a box in the room with hormones and a tape recorder, Frank discovers a message left to him by Jane encouraging him to start over. Leaving the hotel, Frank contacts a woman he hooked up with named Johnnie and asks to stay at her home while he recovers.

The police do not believe Frank exists, frustrating Jane. When Galen contradicts her, she attacks him in a fit of rage before being restrained. A short time later, she asks for a legal deposition so that she can confess. She recounts the events surrounding Frank's surgery and the murders at her clinic that led to her incarceration, but ultimately expresses no remorse for her actions.

Frank sets out to kill everyone involved in his operation, including the men on Honest John's payroll. After learning that the surgery cannot be reversed, he interrogates Honest John, demanding the identity of his surgeon. Honest John implies that Johnnie knows the doctor and that Johnnie is involved. Frank kills Honest John and confronts Johnnie. She admits that the doctor hired her to monitor Frank, but does not know her name. She admits that she only did it in the first place because she was afraid if she did not, the doctor’s guards would kill her. It also becomes apparent that she developed feelings for Frank in the process. While tempted to kill her, Frank chooses to spare her and send her to Reno, Nevada. She agrees to help him lay a trap for the doctor. However, the doctor's bodyguards were expecting Frank, and they sedate him.

Frank awakens in a straitjacket and finally comes face to face with Dr. Jane. She announces her intention to perform another surgery on him to remove his right arm, so he can never kill again. Frank manages to overpower and kill all of Jane's bodyguards, and her surgical assistant. Jane reappears, threatening Frank with a large knife, noting that he has run out of bullets. Admitting she is a coward "when it comes to life and death situations", Jane suggests that they go their separate ways amicably. Frank refuses, reloads his gun with a bullet he had taped to the sole of his boot and shoots Jane, non-fatally. After staging the scene to look as if Jane's assistant killed everyone, Frank is seen holding Jane's knife over her unconscious body.

After completing his revenge, Frank records a video in which he tells her side of the story, to be released after his death. He reveals that Johnnie decided to stay in Reno. At her final meeting with Galen, Dr. Jane reveals that she had hoped to convince him to help her be deemed mentally fit for trial, but realized that it was over when she attacked him. She instead decided to accept her fate, while using the deposition as a means to tell her side of the story for anyone interested. The film ends with Jane examining her mutilated hands; Frank had severed her fingers to ensure she would never practice again.

== Cast ==
- Michelle Rodriguez as Frank Kitchen
- Sigourney Weaver as Dr. Rachel Jane
- Tony Shalhoub as Dr. Ralph Galen
- Anthony LaPaglia as Honest John Hartunian
- Terry Chen as Dr. Lin
- Paul McGillion as Paul Wincott
- Caitlin Gerard as Johnnie
- Zak Santiago as Edward Gonzalez
- Ken Kirzinger as Nurse Becker

== Development ==
In 1978 Denis Hamill wrote the first draft of a script called Tom Boy. It was about a juvenile delinquent who rapes and murders a woman whose husband is a plastic surgeon. He's arrested and goes to prison, but the surgeon captures him and turns him into a woman. The character goes on to commit a series of murders. Walter Hill recalls, "I liked its audacity, and its potential to be ... this always sounds patronizing, but a kind of really terrific B movie. You know, the kind of movie that doesn't get much love when it comes out, but you love watching it on TV years later, much more than you do the 'big' movies of the day." Hill optioned the script with his own money around ten years after he first read it. He tried to write a different version but could not get it to work. He put the project aside until he found a copy of the first draft fifteen years later. He believed he knew how to do it this time and re-optioned the script.

Hill had had success releasing a graphic novel in France and, looking for a follow-up, wrote the project as a graphic novel.

Hill's agent introduced him to a producer, Saïd Ben Saïd, who was willing to invest. "The only rules he laid down was that it'd have to be made for very cheap, and there had to be some name value in the cast," said Hill.

"This movie totally comes out of the same animus as my Tales From the Crypt shows," said Hill. "I mean, these are nasty people, caught in a nasty situation, that out of the experience are somewhat chastened and wiser for it. Assuming they survive—not all survive! Which was certainly out of the old EC Comics. So it's a very small movie, but it's a king-size Tales from the Crypt."

== Production ==
Principal photography on the film began on November 9, 2015 in Vancouver, British Columbia, Canada.

Walter Hill directed the revenge thriller based on a script he co-wrote with Denis Hamill, which Saïd Ben Saïd produced along with Michel Merkt through SBS Productions.

It took Michelle Rodriguez four hours each day she wore male prosthetics and makeup. She chose for her character to have the largest penis available.

The soundtrack is by Giorgio Moroder. The end title theme is composed by Guns N' Roses keyboardist Melissa Reese.

== Release ==
In May 2016, Saban Films acquired distribution rights to the film. It had its world premiere at the Toronto International Film Festival on September 11, 2016. It was released through video on demand on March 3, 2017, prior to opening in a limited release on April 7, 2017.

== Reception ==
The Assignment received negative reviews from critics. It holds a rating of 33% on Rotten Tomatoes based on 63 reviews, with a weighted average of 4/10. The site's critical consensus reads, "The Assignment's premise is bizarrely intriguing; unfortunately, it's also just one of many ingredients fumbled in a disappointing misfire from director Walter Hill." On Metacritic, the film holds a rating of 34 out of 100, based on 20 critics, indicating "generally unfavorable reviews".

Todd McCarthy of The Hollywood Reporter gave the film a positive review, writing: "Hill's most entertaining and...accomplished film in some time", and "an instant cult item". Dennis Harvey of Variety gave the film a negative review, writing: "Gracelessly mashes together hardboiled crime-melodrama cliches and an unintentionally funny 'Oh no! I'm a chick now!!' gender-change narrative hook." Wendy Ide of Screen International also gave the film a negative review, writing: "Despite liberally quoting Shakespeare and Edgar Allan Poe, the screenplay is just not sharp enough to make the audience feel vindicated about dumbing down." Michelle Rodriguez won best actress from Verband der Deutschen Filmkritik, however.

The transgender community was largely disappointed by the image of forced gender reassignment surgery and a boycott was created in response. The director Walter Hill responded by stating, "I wouldn't make a movie that hurt transgender people. Some of them have had a tough time of it, and the last thing I want to do is make anyone's road harder. But look, I understand the concern. Is it lurid? Yes. Is it lowbrow? Well, maybe. Is it offensive? No. I'm just trying to honor the B movies that we grew up with."
