= Mehdi Belhaj Kacem =

French-Tunisian actor, philosopher, and writer

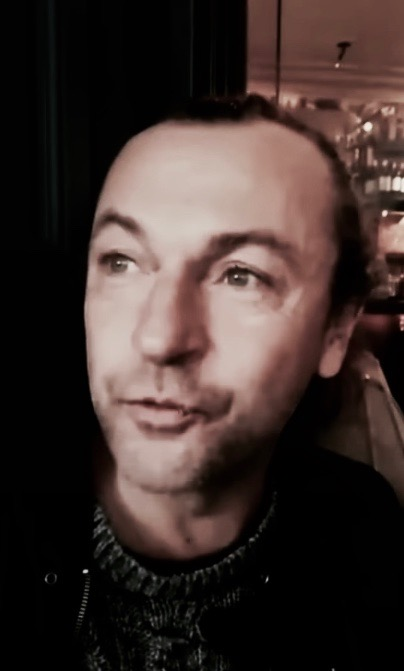
- Born: Tunisia
- Education: Philosopher, writer, actor

Mehdi Belhaj Kacem (MBK) is a French-Tunisian writer, philosopher, and actor.

== Early life ==
Mehdi Belhaj Kacem, also known as MBK, lived in Tunisia until he was 12 years old, when he moved to France. He first lived in the Fosses, a northern suburb of Paris on the dreary "D" rapid transit line.

== Career ==
At the age of 21 in 1994, Kacem published two novels, Cancer and 1993, and another one two years later, Vies et morts d'Irène Lepic.

After his first three novels, he began reading philosophers, such as Kant, Hegel, Deleuze, and Lacan, and by 2000 he was a key figure in the publication of the review EvidenZ. He has since published many more books, as well as starring in films, and done some teaching.

His mentor was leading contemporary philosopher Alain Badiou, but broke with his views on critical theory somewhat controversially with the publication of Transgression and the Inexistent, in English translation in 2014. In this book, he outlines his overall thinking.

He is regarded by some as a leading antiphilosopher of his generation.

== Accolades ==
Kacem was nominated for the Prix Michel Simon for Best Actor for his part in the 2001 film Wild Innocence.

== Filmography ==
- 1995:To Have (or Not)
- 2001: Wild Innocence, winner of the FIPRESCI Prize at the Venice Film Festival
- 2007: La Petite souris (short)

== Selected publications ==
=== Fiction ===
- 1994 : Cancer, éd. Tristram, col. « J'ai lu »/Nouvelle génération n°5153. ISBN 2-290-05153-5
- 1994 : 1993, éd. Tristram. ISBN 2-907681-08-7
- 1996 : Vies et morts d'Irène Lepic, éd. Tristram. ISBN 2-907681-09-5

=== Non-fiction ===
- 1997 : L'Antéforme, éd. Tristram. ISBN 2-207-25511-5
- 2000 : Esthétique du chaos, éd. Tristram. ISBN 2-907681-50-8
- 2001 : Society, éd. Tristram. ISBN 2-907681-30-3
- 2001 : Essence n de l'amour, éd. Fayard/Tristram. ISBN 2-213-61126-2
- 2002 : Théorie du trickster, avec EvidenZ, Sens et Tonka éditeurs. ISBN 2-84534-050-8
- 2002 : De la communauté virtuelle, avec EvidenZ, Sens et Tonka éditeurs. ISBN 2-84534-049-4
- 2002 : La Chute de la démocratie médiatico-parlementaire Sens et Tonka éditeurs. ISBN 2-84534-059-1
- 2004 : Événement et Répétition, préface d'Alain Badiou, éd. Tristram. ISBN 2-907681-42-7
- 2004 : L'Affect, éd. Tristram. ISBN 2-907681-46-X
- 2004 : eXistenZ, éd. Denoël. ISBN 2-907681-51-6
- 2004 : Pop philosophie, entretiens avec Philippe Nassif, éd. Denoël. ISBN 2-207-25511-5
- 2006 : La Psychose française, les banlieues : le ban de la République, éd. Gallimard. ISBN 2-07-078065-1
- 2006 : Incipit « L'Esprit du nihilisme », éd. Ikko. ISBN 2-916011-03-X
- 2007 : Manifeste antiscolastique, Nous éditions. ISBN 978-2-913549-21-0
- 2009 : Ironie et vérité, Nous éditions. ISBN 978-2-913549-29-6
- 2009 : L'esprit du nihilisme, une ontologique de l'Histoire, éd. Fayard. ISBN 978-2-213-63858-4
- 2010 : Inesthétique et mimésis. Badiou, Lacoue-Labarthe et la question de l'art, éd. Lignes. ISBN 978-2-35526-045-2
- 2011 : Après Badiou, éd. Grasset. ISBN 978-2-246-78392-3
- 2020 : Système du pléonectique, éd.Diaphanes. ISBN 978-2-88928-042-1
