= A Castle in Italy =

2013 French film by Valeria Bruni Tedeschi

- Film poster
- Directed by: Valeria Bruni Tedeschi
- Written by: Noémie Lvovsky; Agnès de Sacy; Valeria Bruni Tedeschi
- Produced by: Saïd Ben Saïd
- Starring: Louis Garrel; Valeria Bruni Tedeschi; Xavier Beauvois
- Cinematography: Jeanne Lapoirie
- Edited by: Anne Weil
- Distributed by: Ad Vitam Distribution
- Release dates: 20 May 2013 (Cannes); 2 October 2013 (France)
- Running time: 104 minutes
- Country: France
- Language: French
- Budget: $5.5 million
- Box office: $2.6 million

A Castle in Italy (French: Un château en Italie) is a 2013 French drama film directed by Valeria Bruni Tedeschi. It was nominated for the Palme d'Or at the 2013 Cannes Film Festival.

== Plot ==
An upper-middle-class family is selling their family home. Meanwhile, Louise meets Nathan while taking care of her brother Ludovic, who is ill.

== Cast ==
- Louis Garrel as Nathan
- Valeria Bruni Tedeschi as Louise
- Xavier Beauvois as Serge
- Céline Sallette as Jeanne
- Filippo Timi as Ludovic
- André Wilms as André
- Marie Rivière as Nathan's mother
- Pippo Delbono as The priest
- Silvio Orlando as The Italian mayor
