= Esther Garrel =

French actress (born 1991)

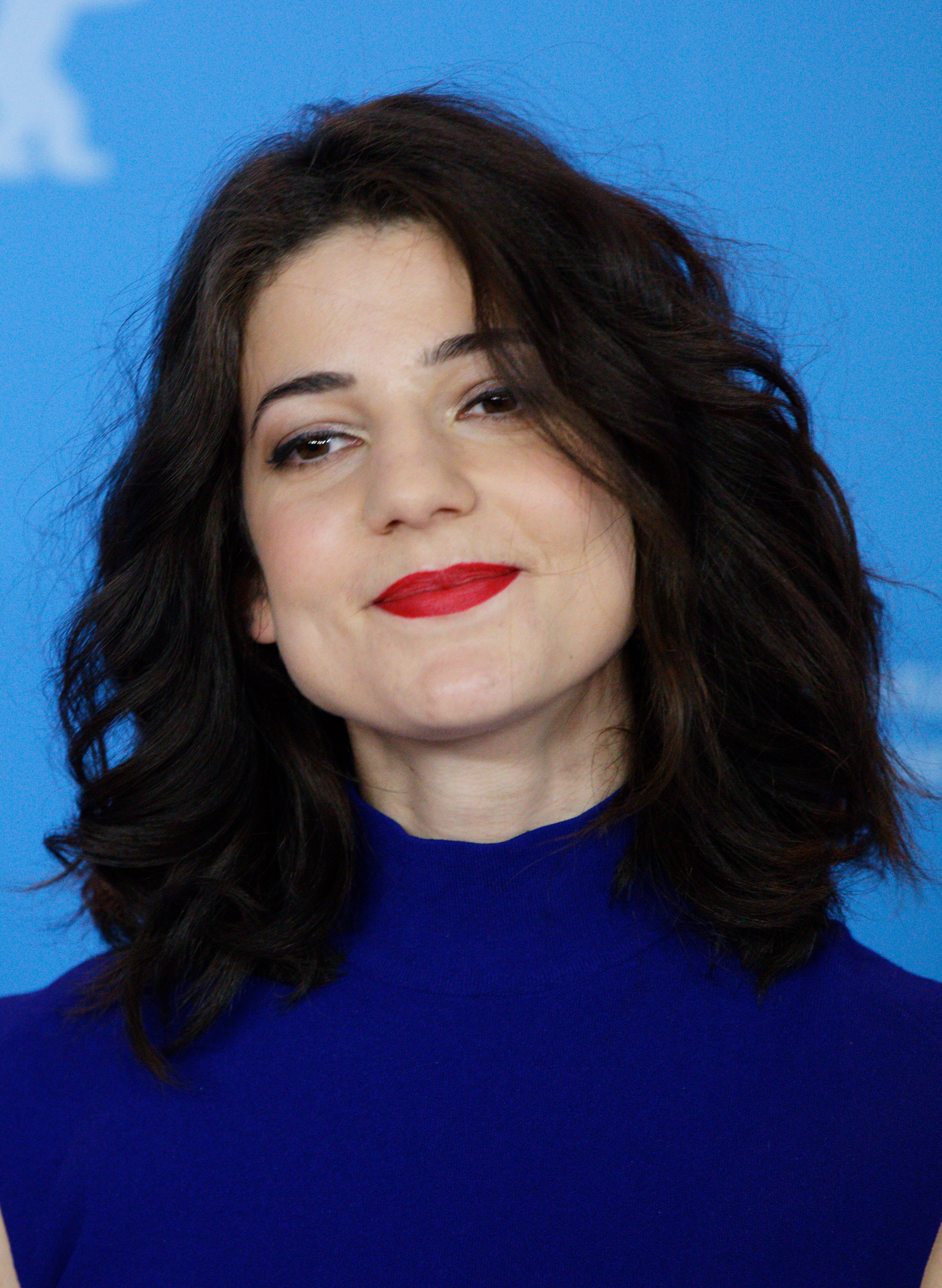
- Garrel in 2017
- Born: 18 February 1991 (age 35); Paris, France
- Occupation: Actress
- Years active: 2001–present
- Parents: Philippe Garrel; Brigitte Sy
- Relatives: Louis Garrel (brother); Maurice Garrel (grandfather)

Esther Garrel (born 18 February 1991) is a French actress. She is most known for her roles in 17 Girls (2011), Jealousy (2013), Call Me by Your Name (2017), and Thirst Street (2017).

== Early life ==
Garrel was born in Paris, the daughter of filmmaker Philippe Garrel and actress Brigitte Sy. Her brother is actor Louis Garrel, and her grandfather is actor Maurice Garrel. Her maternal grandfather was of Sephardic Jewish descent.

== Career ==
Garrel made her film debut in Wild Innocence, directed by her father. She went on to star in 17 Girls, directed by Delphine and Muriel Coulin, which had its world premiere at the 2011 Cannes Film Festival, as well as Youth, directed by Justine Malle. In 2013 Garrel starred alongside her brother in Jealousy, directed by her father.

In 2017, Garrel co-starred in Call Me by Your Name, directed by Luca Guadagnino, opposite Timothée Chalamet, Armie Hammer, and Michael Stuhlbarg. It had its world premiere at the 2017 Sundance Film Festival. She went on to star in Thirst Street, directed by Nathan Silver, which had its world premiere at the Tribeca Film Festival on 21 April 2017, and Lover for a Day, directed by her father, and which had its world premiere at the Cannes Film Festival in May 2017.

== Filmography (selection) ==
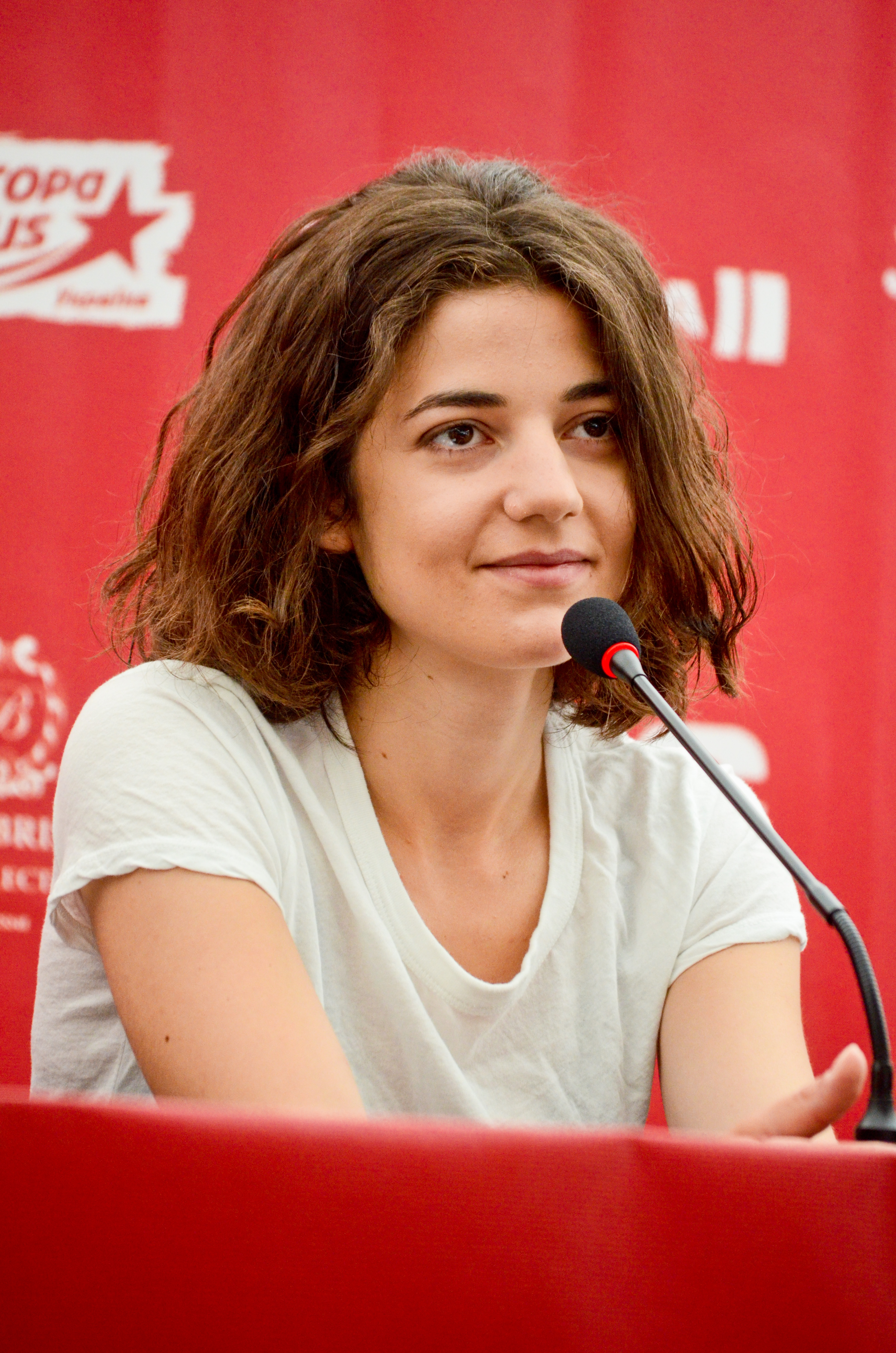
Esther Garrel at the 6th Odesa International Film Festival in 2015.

Year	Title	Role	Notes
1999	Zanzibar à Saint-Sulpice		Short
2001	Wild Innocence	Little girl	
2008	The Beautiful Person	Esther	
2008	Mes copains		Short
2008	Rien dans les poches	Hélène Manikowski	TV movie
2009	Un chat un chat	Sibylle	
2010	Where the Boys Are	Esther	Short
2010	Armandino e il madre	Sara	Short
2011	17 Girls	Flavie	
2011	House of Tolerance	A prostitute	
2012	Camille Rewinds	Mathilde	
2013	Jealousy	Esther	
2013	Jeunesse	Juliette	
2013	Ennui ennui	Cher	Short
2013	Les carrés blancs	She	Short
2013	Je sens plus la vitesse	Marthe	Short
2014	Tu garderas la nuit	Magda	Short
2015	L'Astragale	Marie	
2015	Marguerite & Julien	The storyteller	
2016	Daydreams	Lucienne Heuvelmans	
2016	Après Suzanne	Esther	Short
2016	Victor ou la piété	Camille	Short
2017	Thirst Street	Clémence	
2017	Lover for a Day	Jeanne	
2017	Call Me by Your Name	Marzia	
2018	The Great Pretender	Thérése	
2019	Sisters in Arms	Yaël	
2019	Schneeweiss (Snow White)	Schneeweiss	Short
2020	Adventures of a Mathematician	Francoise	
2022	Julia(s)	Emilie	
2023	The Plough	Martha Burchnar	
2024	Race for Glory: Audi vs. Lancia	Michèle Mouton	
