= Lover for a Day =

2017 film by Philippe Garrel

- Theatrical release poster
- French: L'Amant d'un jour
- Directed by: Philippe Garrel
- Written by: Jean-Claude Carrière; Caroline Deruas; Arlette Langmann; Philippe Garrel
- Produced by: Saïd Ben Saïd; Michel Merkt
- Starring: Éric Caravaca; Esther Garrel; Louise Chevillotte
- Cinematography: Renato Berta
- Edited by: François Gédigier
- Music by: Jean-Louis Aubert
- Production companies: SBS Films; Arte France Cinéma
- Distributed by: SBS Distribution
- Release dates: 19 May 2017 (Cannes); 31 May 2017 (France)
- Running time: 76 minutes
- Country: France
- Language: French
- Box office: $383,872

Lover for a Day (French: L'Amant d'un jour) is a 2017 French drama film co-written and directed by Philippe Garrel, starring Éric Caravaca, Esther Garrel and Louise Chevillotte. It is the third and final installment in Garrel's trilogy of love, following Jealousy (2013) and In the Shadow of Women (2015). The film had its world premiere in the Directors' Fortnight section of the 2017 Cannes Film Festival, where it won the SACD Award.

== Synopsis ==
A philosophy professor named Gilles has a relationship with Ariane, who is one of his students. Gilles' daughter, Jeanne, moves in to live with them after being kicked out of her boyfriend's apartment.

== Cast ==
- Éric Caravaca as Gilles
- Esther Garrel as Jeanne
- Louise Chevillotte as Ariane

== Release ==
The film had its world premiere in the Directors' Fortnight section of the Cannes Film Festival on 19 May 2017. Shortly thereafter, Mubi acquired US, UK, and Ireland distribution rights to the film. It was released in France on 31 May 2017. The film was screened at the New York Film Festival on 10 October 2017.

It was released in the United States on 12 January 2018, and in the United Kingdom on 19 January 2018.

== Reception ==
Lover for a Day received positive reviews from film critics. On the review aggregator website Rotten Tomatoes, the film holds an approval rating of 82% based on 51 reviews, with an average rating of 6.9/10. The website's critics consensus reads, "Lover for a Day offers an absorbing character study that's as well-acted and believable as it is beautifully filmed." On Metacritic, the film holds a rating of 69 out of 100, based on 14 critics, indicating "generally favorable reviews".

Pamela Pianezza of Variety called the film "an alluring and very elegantly crafted — though largely predictable — romantic dramedy that should do well in territories where the French auteur is already known and esteemed."

Cahiers du cinéma placed the film at number 6 on its list of the top 10 films of 2017.
