= Adventures of a Mathematician =

- Theatrical release poster
- Directed by: Thorsten Klein
- Written by: Thorsten Klein
- Starring: Philippe Tłokiński; Esther Garrel; Sam Keeley; Sabin Tambrea; Philipp Christopher
- Release date: 2020 (PSIFF)
- Countries: Germany; Poland; United Kingdom

Adventures of a Mathematician is a 2020 biographical film directed and written by Thorsten Klein. It is focused on the life of Polish mathematician Stanisław Ulam.

== Cast ==
- Philippe Tłokiński as Stanisław Ulam
- Esther Garrel as Françoise
- Sam Keeley as John Williams Calkin
- Sabin Tambrea as Klaus Fuchs
- Philipp Christopher as Henry Hitchens

== Production and release ==
The biographical film, focused on the Polish mathematician Stanisław Ulam, was directed and written by Thorsten Klein. the film was a co-production between Germany, Poland, and the United Kingdom. Principal photography took place in Germany and Poland. The film is mostly in English. Its world premiere was at the 2020 Palm Springs International Film Festival.

== Reception ==
The Hollywood Reporter found the film to be "An uneven but compelling look at the dawn of the nuclear age."
