= Valérie Lang =

French actress

- Born: Valérie Suzanne Rose Lang; 24 March 1966; Nancy, Meurthe-et-Moselle, France
- Died: 22 July 2013 (aged 47); Paris, France
- Education: Conservatoire National d'Art Dramatique
- Occupation: Actress
- Years active: 1993–2013
- Spouse: Stanislas Nordey
- Father: Jack Lang

Valérie Suzanne Rose Lang (24 March 1966 – 22 July 2013) was a French actress of stage, screen and television. She was educated at the Conservatoire National d'Art Dramatique in Paris under the tutelage of Jean-Pierre Vincent. Lang partook in the productions as an associate member of the Nordey troupe at the Théâtre des Amandiers and had roles in such plays as The Triumph of Love, Venus in Furs, A Flea in Her Ear, Philosophy in the Bedroom and Tartuffe. She co-directed the Théâtre Gérard Philipe between 1998 and 2001 and oversaw the Théâtre citoyen project. Lang was in the film and television productions of Les Misérables, Father of My Children, Neuilly Yo Mama!, Accomplices, The Beautiful Person and Le Divorce. She was an unsuccessful candidate to be deputy for Jean-Louis Ragot for the Democratic Movement political party in the 2007 French legislative election.

== Early life ==
Lang was born on 24 March 1966, in Nancy, Meurthe-et-Moselle, France. She was the daughter of Jack Lang, the former French Minister of Culture, and his wife Monique Lang (née Buczynski). Lang has one older sister. She was raised in an active Jewish community and educated as such. Lang inherited her parents' love for the theatre, and she spent time in theatres when she was young in the 1970s. She was educated under the tutelage of Jean-Pierre Vincent at the Conservatoire National d'Art Dramatique in Paris between 1989 and 1992.

== Career ==
From 1993, Lang began playing theatre roles, and she partook in the productions of Nanterre-Amandiers until 1998, while also serving as an associate member of the Nordey troupe at the Théâtre des Amandiers. According to René Solis of Libération, she "had to fight against skeptics, quick to label her "daughter of". And she has, throughout her theatrical adventures". Lang was featured in the plays Tartuffe by Molière, A Flea in Her Ear by Georges Feydeau, The Triumph of Love by Pierre de Marivaux, Philosophy in the Bedroom by Marquis de Sade, Hiroshima mon Amour by Marguerite Duras, Pasteur Ephraïm Magnus by Hans Henny Jahnn and Venus in Furs by Leopold von Sacher-Masoch. She was co-director of the Théâtre Gérard Philipe, which was the national drama centre, located in Saint-Denis, Seine-Saint-Denis from 1998 to 2001. Lang oversaw the Théâtre citoyen project which led to the theatre going bankrupt.

She was also featured in cinema and television productions. Lang was in the 2000 Josée Dayan television series Les Misérables, portrayed the role of a policewomen in the 2003 James Ivory film Le Divorce, Priscilla in the 2008 film Soit je meurs, soit je vais mieux, The Beautiful Person by Christophe Honoré released in the same year, the 2009 Gabriel Julien-Laferrière film Neuilly Yo Mama!, played Isabelle, the mother of Moune, in the film Father of My Children released the same year, as well as Holiday in 2010 and Accomplices a year earlier. She and Dayan worked together on the 2011 television film La Mauvaise Rencontre. In 2011, she and her friend Josiane Balasko from Pigalle had roles in the Théâtre de la Renaissance production of La Nuit sera chaude. Lang recorded a version of Pauline Réage's Story of O, which was released on CD in June 2013. She was due to play the part of Phaedra in the production of Phèdre by Yiannis Ritsos at the Théâtre de la Ville in Paris from January 2014.

In the 2007 French legislative election, Lang stood in the seat of Modem in the third constituency of Hauts-de-Seine as a deputy for the candidate Jean-Louis Ragot for the Democratic Movement political party. She had joined the party due to her rejection of Ségolène Royal. The two earned just more than ten per cent of the popular vote. Lang was committed to raising awareness of undocumented immigrants with Emmanuelle Béart, Balasko and the Droits Devant association, particularly in certain districts of Hauts-de-Seine.

== Personal life ==
She was married to the actor and director Stanislas Nordey. In 2009, Lang signed a petition in support of Polish film director Roman Polanski, calling for his release after he was arrested in Switzerland in relation to his 1977 charge for drugging and anally raping a 13-year-old girl. On the early morning of 22 July 2013, Lang died of a brain tumour in Paris' 9th arrondissement, after suffering from cancer for the previous five years. Her funeral occurred on the afternoon of 25 July at Montparnasse Cemetery.

== Legacy ==
Fabienne Arvers and Patrick Sourd of Les Inrockuptibles described Lang as "more than an artist" and someone who "was not afraid of anything". France Culture broadcast three hours of tributes to Lang on the evening of 28 July 2013.
