= Jealousy (2013 film) =

Film by Philippe Garrel

- Theatrical release poster
- French: La Jalousie
- Directed by: Philippe Garrel
- Written by: Philippe Garrel; Caroline Deruas; Arlette Langmann; Marc Cholodenko
- Produced by: Saïd Ben Saïd
- Starring: Louis Garrel; Anna Mouglalis
- Cinematography: Willy Kurant
- Edited by: Yann Dedet
- Music by: Jean-Louis Aubert
- Production company: SBS Productions
- Distributed by: Capricci Films
- Release dates: 5 September 2013 (Venice); 4 December 2013 (France)
- Running time: 77 minutes
- Country: France
- Language: French
- Budget: €2.4 million
- Box office: $63,946

Jealousy (French: La Jalousie) is a 2013 French drama film co-written and directed by Philippe Garrel, starring Louis Garrel and Anna Mouglalis. It was screened in the main competition section at the 70th Venice International Film Festival. It is the first installment in Garrel's trilogy of love, the second being In the Shadow of Women (2015) and the third being Lover for a Day (2017).

== Synopsis ==
Louis, an impoverished actor, tries to make his girlfriend Claudia a big star. However, in spite of all his efforts, he cannot get her proper roles. Eventually she falls in love with another man and cheats on him.

== Cast ==
- Louis Garrel as Louis
- Anna Mouglalis as Claudia
- Rebecca Convenant as Clothilde
- Olga Milshtein as Charlotte
- Esther Garrel as Esther
- Arthur Igual as the friend of Louis
- Jérôme Huguet as Antoine
- Manon Kneusé as Lucie

== Release ==
The film had its world premiere in the Competition section of the 70th Venice International Film Festival on 5 September 2013. It was released in France on 4 December 2013 by Capricci Films.

== Reception ==
On the review aggregator website Rotten Tomatoes, the film holds an approval rating of 73% based on 26 reviews, with an average rating of 6.4/10. On Metacritic, the film has a weighted average score of 66 out of 100, based on 17 critics, indicating "generally favorable reviews".

Kimber Myers of IndieWire gave the film a grade of B, writing: "While it features characters making unrelatable decisions, this 77-minute film is nonetheless compelling and beautifully constructed, and will be of particular interest for fans of French cinema." Boyd van Hoeij of The Hollywood Reporter wrote: "Acting is low-key but believable throughout, with Mouglalis finally shedding her supermodel looks to show the contradictory and flawed but very human character underneath." Leslie Felperin of Variety called it "slight but watchable".

Cahiers du cinéma named it the seventh best film of 2013.
