= Regular Lovers =

2005 film by Philippe Garrel

- Theatrical release poster
- French: Les Amants réguliers
- Directed by: Philippe Garrel
- Written by: Philippe Garrel; Arlette Langmann; Marc Cholodenko
- Produced by: Gilles Sandoz
- Starring: Louis Garrel; Clotilde Hesme
- Cinematography: William Lubtchansky
- Edited by: Françoise Collin; Philippe Garrel
- Music by: Jean-Claude Vannier
- Production companies: Maïa Films; Arte France Cinéma
- Distributed by: Ad Vitam Distribution
- Release dates: 3 September 2005 (Venice); 26 October 2005 (France)
- Running time: 175 minutes
- Country: France
- Language: French
- Box office: $125,381

Regular Lovers (French: Les Amants réguliers) is a 2005 French coming-of-age romantic drama film directed by Philippe Garrel and starring Louis Garrel and Clotilde Hesme. Set in 1968, it tells the story of a young couple. The film had its world premiere in the Competition section of the 62nd Venice International Film Festival on 3 September 2005. It was released in France on 26 October 2005.

== Plot ==
In 1968, François (Louis Garrel) joins the civil unrest in Paris with his friends. After the unrest dies down, they retreat to a mansion and enjoy a period of hedonism, in stark contrast to their time at the barricades. François meets Lilie and falls in love with her.

== Cast ==
- Louis Garrel as François Dervieux
- Clotilde Hesme as Lilie
- Julien Lucas as Antoine
- Eric Rulliat as Jean-Christophe
- Nicolas Bridet as Luc
- Mathieu Genet as Nicolas
- Rebecca Convenant as Charlène
- Maurice Garrel as Lucien
- Marc Barbé as Jean
- Nicolas Maury as Gauthier
- Brigitte Sy as François's mother
- Joséphine de Meaux

== Release ==
The film had its world premiere in the Competition section of the 62nd Venice International Film Festival on 3 September 2005. It was released in France on 26 October 2005.

== Reception ==
=== Critical response ===
On review aggregator website Rotten Tomatoes, the film holds an approval rating of 82% based on 17 reviews, and an average rating of 6.7/10. On Metacritic, the film has a weighted average score of 76 out of 100, based on 7 critics, indicating "generally favorable reviews".

Peter Bradshaw of The Guardian gave the film 3 out of 5 stars, saying: "The violence and inarticulate idealism, and the disappointments and frustrations of youth, are still swirling around in Philippe Garrel's head, and he transfers them, almost unedited, on to the cinema screen." Jesse Paddock of Slant Magazine called it "a wonderful tribute to the ideals of youth." The New York Times called it a Critic's Pick at its 2007 limited theatrical release and called it a "magnificent" "tender portrait of late-1960s French youth."

The New Yorker's Richard Brody included the film as number 5 on his list of "Best of the Decade" for the 2000s.

=== Accolades ===
Award	Year of ceremony	Category	Recipient(s)	Result	Ref(s)
Venice Film Festival	2005	Silver Lion	Philippe Garrel	Won	
Louis Delluc Prize	2005	Best Film	Regular Lovers	Won	
Lumière Awards	2006	Best Director	Philippe Garrel	Won	
César Award	2006	Most Promising Actor	Louis Garrel	Won	
César Award	2006	Best Cinematography	William Lubtchansky	Nominated	
European Film Awards	2006	FIPRESCI Prize	Philippe Garrel	Won	
