= Wild Innocence =

2001 film

- Theatrical release poster
- Directed by: Philippe Garrel
- Written by: Philippe Garrel; Arlette Langmann; Marc Cholodenko
- Produced by: Pascal Caucheteux
- Starring: Mehdi Belhaj Kacem; Julia Faure
- Cinematography: Raoul Coutard
- Edited by: Françoise Collin
- Music by: Jean-Claude Vannier; John Cale; Them; Migala
- Production companies: Les Films Alain Sarde; Why Not Productions; The Kasander Film Company
- Distributed by: Mars Distribution
- Release date: 6 September 2001 (VFF)
- Running time: 123 minutes
- Countries: France; Netherlands
- Language: French

Wild Innocence (French: Sauvage Innocence) is a 2001 French film directed by Philippe Garrel.

== Plot ==
A young filmmaker wants to make a film about the social problem of heroin consumption. However, the film's producers are themselves heroin dealers.

== Cast ==
- Mehdi Belhaj Kacem - François Mauge
- Julia Faure - Lucie
- Michel Subor - Chas
- Mathieu Genet - Alex
- Valérie Kéruzoré - Flora
- Jean Pommier - Hutten
- Francine Bergé - Marie-Thérèse's mother
- Maurice Garrel - François's father
- Esther Garrel - Little girl
