= Saint-Gervais, Isère =

Saint-Gervais
- Commune
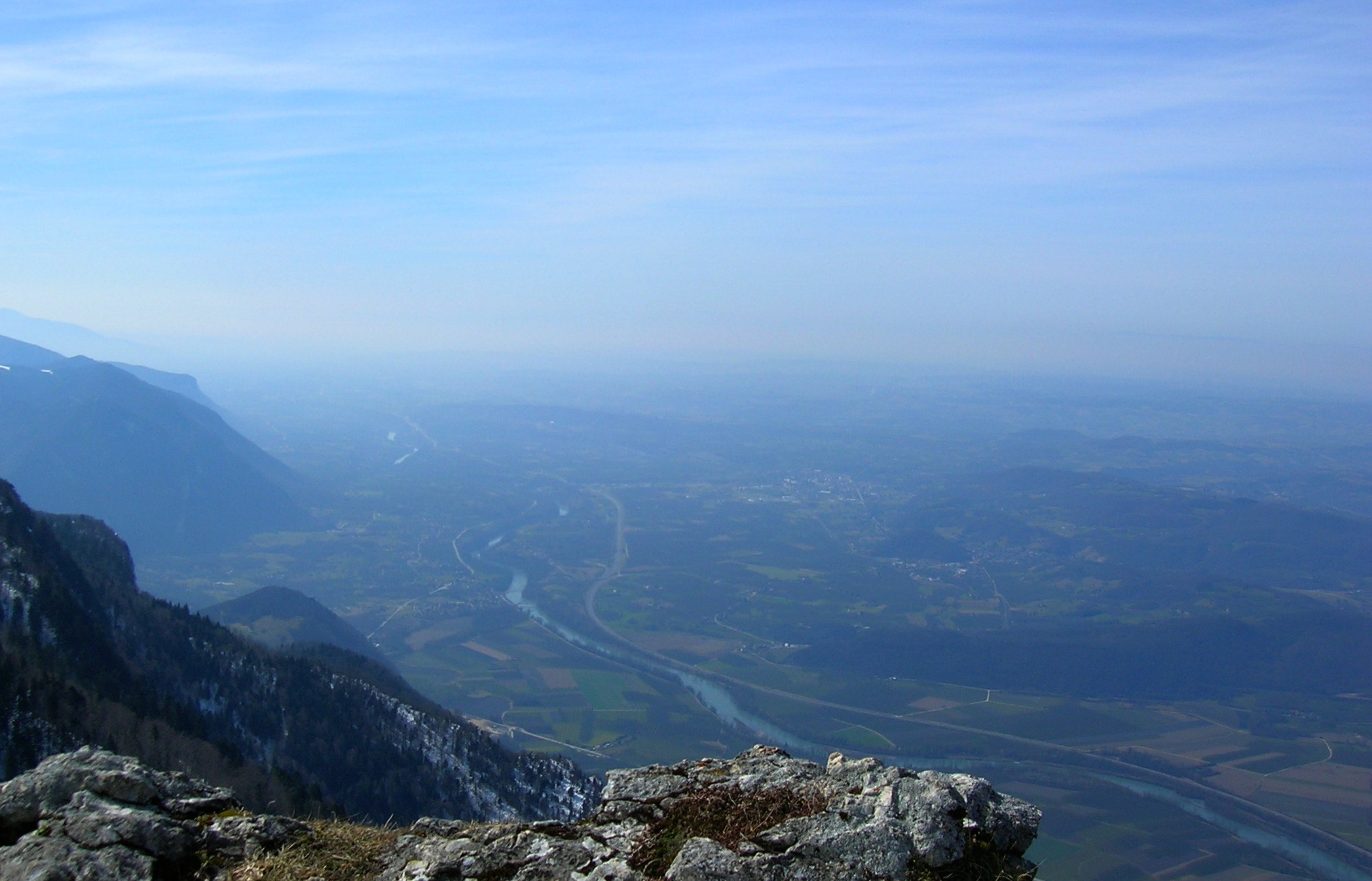
- Saint-Gervais and Rovon to the left of the Isère, seen from la Cheminée (Vercors).
- Location of Saint-Gervais
- Location within France Location within Auvergne-Rhône-Alpes
- Coordinates: 45°12′09″N 5°28′58″E
- Country: France
- Region: Auvergne-Rhône-Alpes
- Department: Isère
- Arrondissement: Grenoble
- Canton: Le Sud Grésivaudan

Government
  - Mayor (2020–2026): Didier Cheneau
- Area^{1}: 13.15 km^{2} (5.08 sq mi)
- Highest elevation: 1,536 m (5,039 ft)
- Lowest elevation: 178 m (584 ft)
- Population (2023): 538
  - Density: 40.9/km^{2} (106/sq mi)
- Time zone: UTC+01:00 (CET)
  - Summer (DST): UTC+02:00 (CEST)
- INSEE/Postal code: 38390 /38470
- ^{1} French Land Register data, which excludes lakes, ponds, glaciers > 1 km^{2} (0.386 sq mi or 247 acres) and river estuaries.

Saint-Gervais (French pronunciation: [sɛ̃ ʒɛʁvɛ]) is a commune in the Isère department in southeastern France.

== Population ==
Historical population
Year	Pop.	±% p.a.
1968	298	—
1975	256	−2.15%
1982	288	+1.70%
1990	295	+0.30%
1999	377	+2.76%
2007	532	+4.40%
2012	560	+1.03%
2017	549	−0.40%
2023	538	−0.34%
Source: INSEE

== See also ==
- Communes of the Isère department
- Parc naturel régional du Vercors
