= Louis Garrel =

French film actor, director, and screenwriter

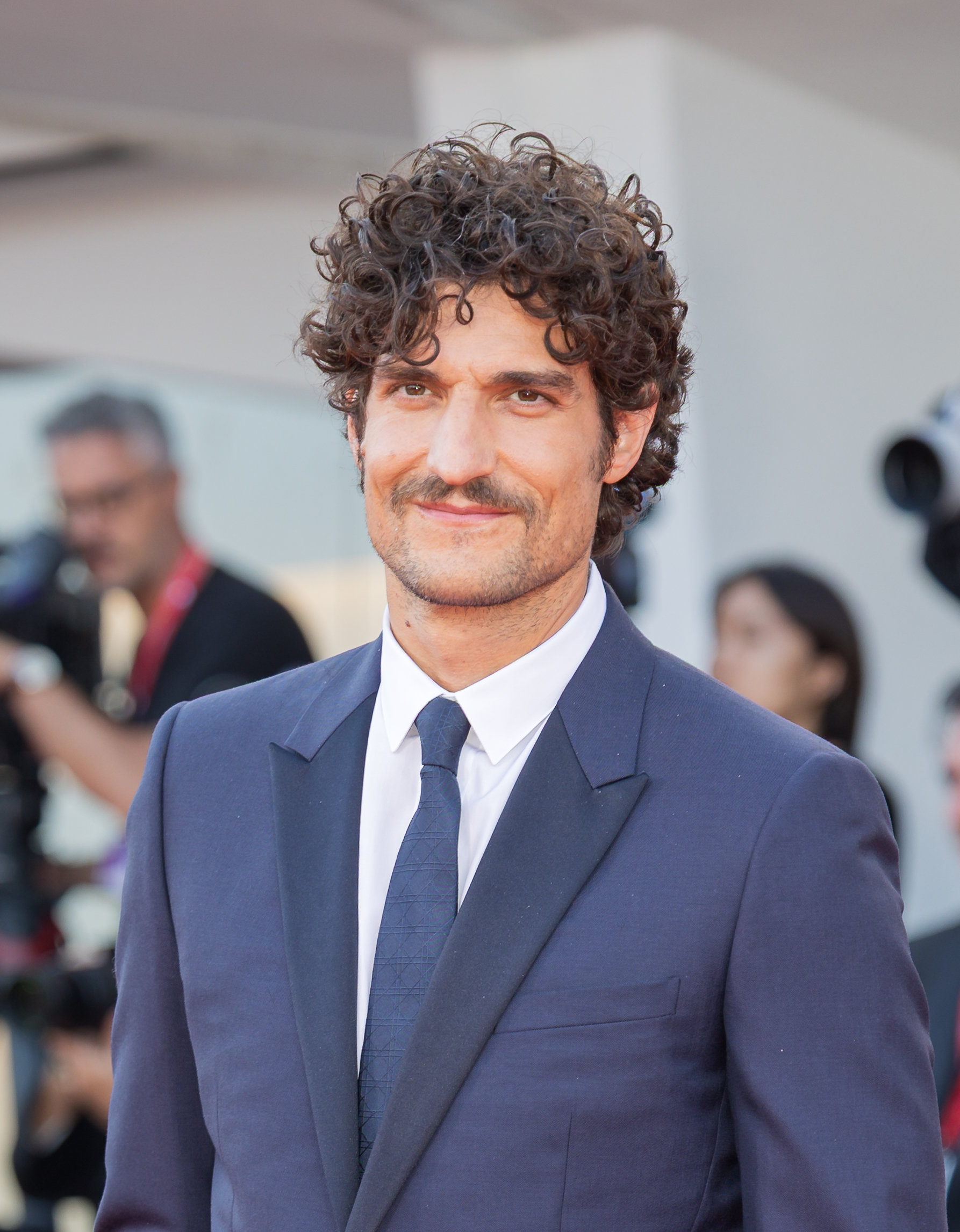
- Garrel in 2025
- Born: 14 June 1983 (age 43); Paris, France
- Occupations: Actor; director; screenwriter
- Years active: 1989–present
- Spouse: Laetitia Casta (m. 2017; div. 2025)
- Partner: Valeria Bruni Tedeschi (2007–2012)
- Children: 2
- Parent(s): Philippe Garrel; Brigitte Sy
- Relatives: Maurice Garrel (grandfather); Esther Garrel (sister)

Louis Garrel (born 14 June 1983) is a French actor and filmmaker. He is best known for his starring role in The Dreamers (2003), directed by Bernardo Bertolucci. He has regularly appeared in films by French director Christophe Honoré, including Ma Mère (2004), Dans Paris (2006), Love Songs (2007), The Beautiful Person (2008) and Making Plans for Lena (2009). He has also been in films directed by his father, Philippe Garrel, including Regular Lovers (2005), Frontier of the Dawn (2008), A Burning Hot Summer (2011), and Jealousy (2013).

He usually plays similar characters such as men in the middle of love triangles or important historical figures such as Jacques de Bascher in Saint Laurent (2014), Jean-Luc Godard in Redoutable (2017), and Alfred Dreyfus in An Officer and a Spy (2019). His performances have received many nominations at the César Awards.

Garrel has also performed in several feature films that he wrote and directed, including: Two Friends (2015), A Faithful Man (2018), The Crusade (2021) and The Innocent (2022).

He is also known for working with numerous female directors such as Valeria Bruni Tedeschi, Brigitte Sy, Maïwenn, Greta Gerwig and Nicole Garcia.

== Early life and education ==
Garrel was born in Paris, France, the son of director Philippe Garrel and actress Brigitte Sy, and the brother of actress Esther Garrel. His grandfather, Maurice Garrel, and his godfather, Jean-Pierre Léaud, are also notable French actors. His maternal grandfather was of Sephardic Jewish descent. Garrel grew up in the district of Pigalle in Paris, where he lived with his mother.

Garrel is a graduate of the Conservatoire de Paris.

== Career ==
Garrel was six when he first appeared onscreen in the film Les Baisers de secours. Twelve years later, he appeared in Ceci est mon corps.

In 2002, Garrel gained international recognition playing Eva Green's twin brother in The Dreamers. Director Bernardo Bertolucci found him on the first session of casting in Paris. Garrel has starred in various French films, including Les Amants réguliers (2005), directed by his father Philippe Garrel. He was awarded the César Award for Most Promising Actor for his work in the film.

Garrel has collaborated five times with filmmaker Christophe Honoré in the feature films Ma Mère (2004), an adaptation of the eponymous novel by Georges Bataille; Dans Paris (2006); Love Songs (2007); The Beautiful Person (2008); Making Plans for Lena (2009); and Two Friends (2015). He also appeared in Valeria Bruni Tedeschi's Actrices (2007), Rachid Hami's Choisir d'aimer (2008) and Philipe Garrel's Frontier of the Dawn (2008).

In 2008, he launched into directing with his short film Mes copains. Two years later, he directed the short film Petit Tailleur.

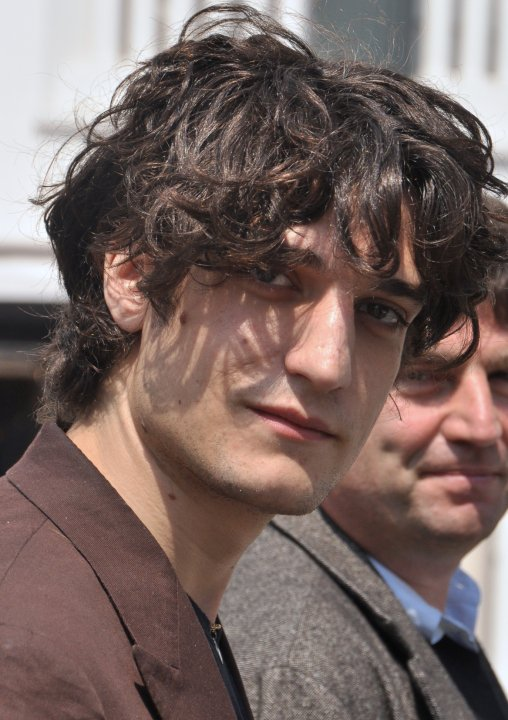
Garrel at the 2010 Cannes Film Festival

He appeared in Heartbeats, by director Xavier Dolan, released in 2010. In 2011, Garrel directed the short film La Règle de trois, with Vincent Macaigne and Golshifteh Farahani, which he presented at the Locarno Festival.

In 2014, he played Jacques de Bascher, the lover of Karl Lagerfeld and Yves Saint Laurent in Bertrand Bonello's film Saint Laurent.

His directorial debut film Two Friends, starring Golshifteh Farahani, Vincent Macaigne and himself, was released in 2015.

In 2019, Garrel starred in An Officer and a Spy directed by Roman Polanski, which revolved around the Dreyfus affair. The film had its world premiere at the Venice Film Festival in August 2019, and was released in November 2019. The same year, he starred in Little Women, based upon novel of the same name.

In 2020, Garrel starred in Rifkin's Festival directed by Woody Allen, DNA directed by Maïwenn, and in 2021, The Story of My Wife opposite Léa Seydoux, directed by Ildikó Enyedi.

== Other activities ==
Garrel featured in Emporio Armani's fall 2004 ads – alongside his The Dreamers costars Michael Pitt and Eva Green – and also appeared in Armani's fall 2023 campaign. He became the face of Valentino's Uomo fragrance in 2014 and directed a short film featuring Àstrid Bergès-Frisbey for a Valentino Donna campaign in 2015. In 2024, he was named a menswear brand ambassador for Dior.

== Personal life ==
Aside from his native French, Garrel speaks English and Italian.

Garrel was in a relationship with Valeria Bruni Tedeschi from 2007 to 2012. She is the elder sister of Carla Bruni. In 2009, Bruni Tedeschi and Garrel adopted a baby girl, Oumy, from Senegal.

Garrel was also in a relationship with Iranian and French actress Golshifteh Farahani, who he directed and co-starred with in Two Friends (2015).

In June 2017, Garrel married French model and actress Laetitia Casta and the couple have been together since 2015. In March 2021, they welcomed their first child together, a son named Azel. In 2025, several media outlets reported that they had separated. This was confirmed in Garrel's 2026 interview with the Financial Times.

In 2009 and 2010, Garrel signed two petitions in support of film director Roman Polanski, calling for his release after Polanski was arrested in Switzerland in relation to his 1977 charge for drugging and raping a then 13-year-old girl.

== Filmography ==
=== As actor ===
Year	Title	Role	Notes
1989	Les Baisers de secours	Lo	
2001	Ceci est mon corps	Antoine	
2002	The War in Paris (La Guerre à Paris)		
2003	The Dreamers	Théo	
2004	Ma mère	Pierre	
2005	Regular Lovers	François Dervieux	César Award for Most Promising Actor; Etoiles d'Or for Best Male Newcomer
2006	Dans Paris	Jonathan	
2006	A Curtain Raiser (Un lever de rideau)	Bruno	Short film
2007	Love Songs	Ismaël Bénoliel	Nominated—Globes de Cristal Award for Best Actor
2007	Actrices	Éric	
2008	Choisir d'aimer	Pascal	
2008	Frontier of the Dawn	François	
2008	The Beautiful Person	Jacques Nemours	
2009	Making Plans for Lena	Simon	
2010	Le Mariage à trois	Théo	
2010	Heartbeats	Guest in the final scene	
2010	Diarchy	Luc	Short film written and directed by Ferdinando Cito Filomarino
2011	Beloved	Clément	
2011	La Règle de trois	Louis	Short film (also as director and screenwriter); Prix Jean Vigo
2011	A Burning Hot Summer	Frédéric	
2012	Les coquillettes	Louis Garrel	
2013	A Castle in Italy	Nathan	
2013	Jealousy	Louis	
2014	Saint Laurent	Jacques de Bascher	Nominated—César Award for Best Supporting Actor
2015	L'Astragale	Jacky	
2015	In the Shadow of Women	Narrator (voice)	
2015	Mon roi	Solal	Nominated—César Award for Best Supporting Actor
2015	Two Friends	Abel	Also as director and screenwriter
2016	Planetarium	Fernand Prouvé	
2016	From the Land of the Moon	André Sauvage	
2017	False Confessions	Dorante	TV movie
2017	Redoubtable	Jean-Luc Godard	Nominated—César Award for Best Actor; Nominated—Lumière Award for Best Actor
2017	Ismael's Ghosts	Ivan Dedalus	
2018	One Nation, One King	Robespierre	
2018	At Eternity's Gate	Aurier's Article (voice)	
2018	A Faithful Man	Abel	Also writer and director
2019	Funan	Khuon (voice)	
2019	An Officer and a Spy	Alfred Dreyfus	Nominated—César Award for Best Supporting Actor
2019	Little Women	Friedrich Bhaer	
2020	DNA	François	Nominated—César Award for Best Supporting Actor
2020	Rifkin's Festival	Philippe	
2021	The Crusade	Abel	
2021	The Story of My Wife	Dedin	
2021	Our Men	Maxime	
2022	Coma	Dr. Ballard	voice
2022	Scarlet	Jean	
2022	Forever Young	Patrice Chéreau	
2022	The Innocent	Abel Lefranc	Nominated—César Award for Best Actor; Nominated—César Award for Best Director
2022	Caravaggio's Shadow	The Shadow	
2023	The Plough	Louis	
2023	The Three Musketeers: D'Artagnan	King Louis XIII	
2024	The Second Act	David	
2024	Saint-Ex	Antoine de Saint-Exupéry	
2025	Arco	Stewie (voice)	
2025	Chien 51	Jon Mafram	
2025	Couture	Anton	
2026	House of Love	Self	Short film
2026	It Will Happen Tonight	Matteo	
2026	Just an Illusion	Yves Dayan	
2026	Christian Dior's Night in Color	Christian Dior	Short film, voice
TBA	The Custom of the Country †		Filming

=== As filmmaker ===
Year	Title	Credited as		Notes
Year	Title	Director	Screenwriter	Notes
2008	Mes copains	Yes	Yes	Short film
2010	Petit Tailleur	Yes	Yes	Short film Nominated—César Award for Best Short Film
2011	La Règle de trois	Yes	Yes	Short film (also as actor)
2015	Two Friends	Yes	Yes	Also as actor Nominated—Cannes Film Festival – Caméra d'Or; Nominated—Lumière Award for Best First Film
2018	A Faithful Man	Yes	Yes	Also as actor
2021	The Crusade	Yes	Yes	Also as actor
2022	The Innocent	Yes	Yes	Also as actor

=== Other awards ===
- 2009: Prix Patrick Dewaere
