= A Burning Hot Summer =

- Theatrical release poster
- Directed by: Philippe Garrel
- Written by: Philippe Garrel; Marc Chodolenko; Caroline Deruas
- Produced by: Edouard Weil
- Starring: Monica Bellucci; Louis Garrel; Céline Sallette; Jérôme Robart
- Cinematography: Willy Kurant
- Edited by: Yann Dedet
- Music by: John Cale
- Production company: Rectangle Productions
- Distributed by: Wild Bunch Distribution
- Release dates: 2 September 2011 (Venice Film Festival); 28 September 2011 (France)
- Running time: 95 minutes
- Countries: France; Italy; Switzerland
- Language: French
- Budget: $3.1 million
- Box office: $190.000

A Burning Hot Summer (French: Un été brûlant), also titled That Summer, is a 2011 French-Italian-Swiss drama film directed by Philippe Garrel, starring Monica Bellucci, Louis Garrel, Céline Sallette, and Jérôme Robart. It was screened at the 68th Venice International Film Festival in competition.

== Plot ==
A painter Frédéric has an actress wife Angèle. Frédéric becomes friends with Paul. Paul and his girlfriend Élisabeth stay with Frédéric and Angèle in Rome.

== Cast ==
- Monica Bellucci as Angèle
- Louis Garrel as Frédéric
- Céline Sallette as Élisabeth
- Jérôme Robart as Paul
- Vladislav Galard as Roland
- Vincent Macaigne as Achille
- Grégory Fitoussi as Lepartenare
- Maurice Garrel as grandfather

== Production ==
The film was the second collaboration between director Philippe Garrel and the French production company Rectangle Productions. It received co-production support from Italy's Faro Film and Switzerland's Prince Film. The 3.1 million euro budget included money from the CNC, the Italian Ministry of Culture, the Swiss Federal Office for Culture, 400,000 euro from Eurimages and 192,000 euro from the Île-de-France region. The film was first announced in 2009 under the title J'ai gardé les anges, which means "I have kept the angels". The title had been changed to the current when principal photography began in July 2010. Filming took place during eight weeks in Rome and Paris.

== Release ==
The film premiered on 2 September 2011 in competition at the 68th Venice International Film Festival. The French release was set to 28 September through Wild Bunch Distribution.

== Reception ==
On review aggregator website Rotten Tomatoes, the film holds an approval rating of 55% based on 11 reviews, with an average rating of 5.5/10. On Metacritic, the film has a weighted average score of 62 out of 100, based on 6 critics, indicating "generally favorable reviews".

Deborah Young of The Hollywood Reporter called the film "dramatically lifeless and uninvolving." Roger Ebert rated the film 2 out of 4 stars, writing that the film "failed to persuade [him] of any reason for its existence" and describing the performances "listless and tired".
