= Philippe Garrel =

French filmmaker (born 1948)

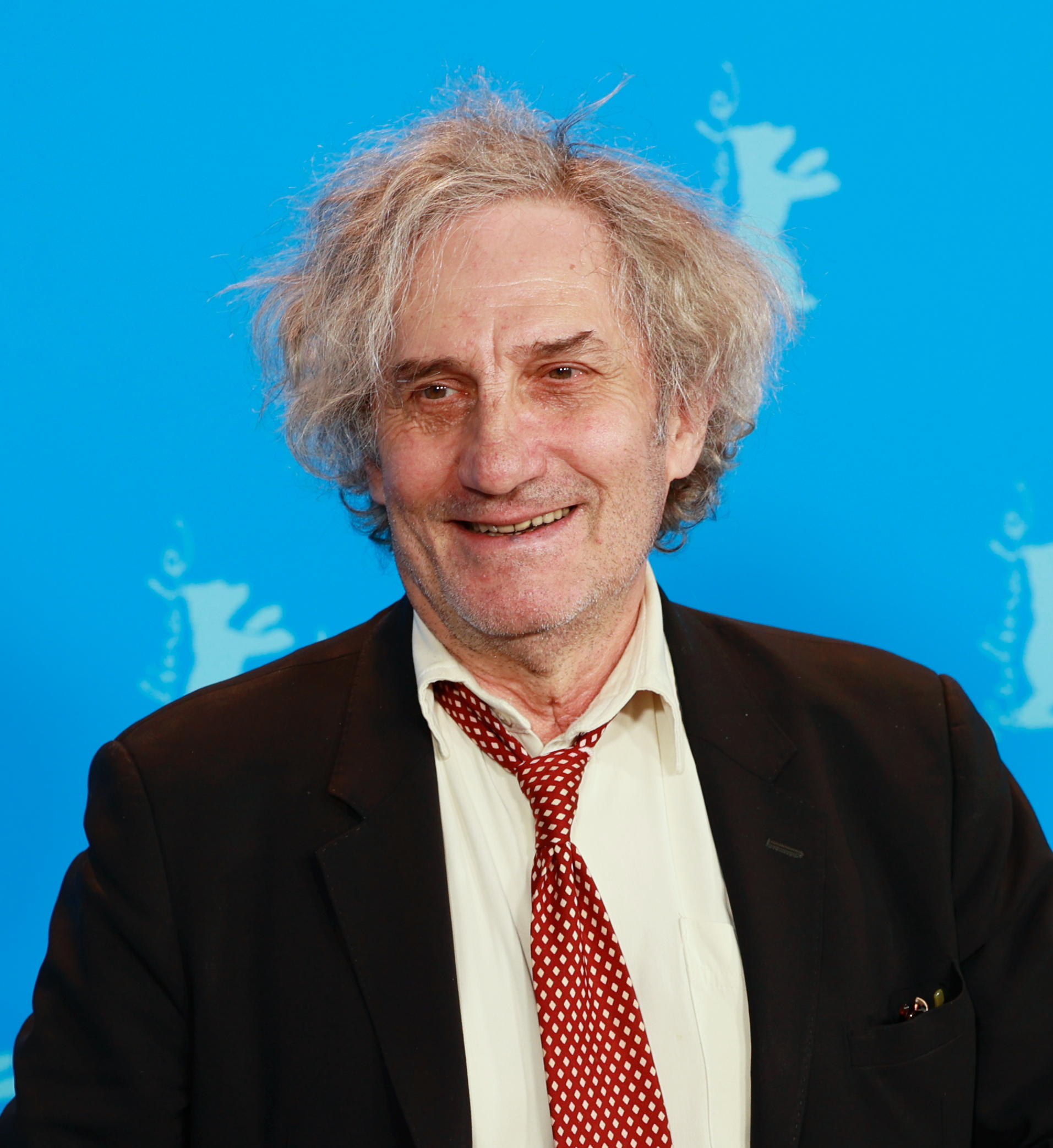
- Garrel at the 73rd Berlin International Film Festival in February 2023
- Born: 6 April 1948 (age 78); Boulogne-Billancourt, France
- Occupations: Director; screenwriter; film editor; producer; cinematographer
- Years active: 1964–present
- Spouse(s): Brigitte Sy (divorced); Caroline Deruas-Garrel
- Partner: Nico (1969–1979)
- Children: Louis Garrel; Esther Garrel
- Parent: Maurice Garrel

Philippe Garrel (French: [gaʁɛl]; born 6 April 1948) is a French director, cinematographer, screenwriter, film editor, and producer, associated with the French New Wave movement. His films have won him awards at Cannes Film Festival, Venice Film Festival, and Berlin Film Festival.

== Early life ==
Philippe Garrel was born in Boulogne-Billancourt in 1948, the son of actor Maurice Garrel and his wife. His brother, Thierry Garrel, is a producer.

The younger Garrel became interested in film and started his career early, influenced by the new work of Jean-Luc Godard and François Truffaut. At the age of 16, Garrel wrote and directed his first film, Les Enfants désaccordés, in 1964.

== Awards ==
In 1982, Garrel won the Prix Jean Vigo for the film L'Enfant secret. He won Perspectives du Cinéma Award at the Cannes Film Festival in 1984 for his 1983 film Liberté, la nuit. Over a ten-year period, Garrel enjoyed a good run of critical recognition at the Venice Film Festival. In 1991, he won a Silver Lion for his film J'entends plus la guitare, which was nominated for a Golden Lion. Le Vent de la nuit was nominated for a Golden Lion in 1999. Two years later, Sauvage Innocence was nominated for a Golden Lion and won the FIPRESCI Prize. His 2005 film, Les Amants réguliers, won him the Silver Lion, for Best Director.

== Personal life ==
In 1968, Garrel was in a relationship with actress Anne Bourguignon, whom he directed in the film Anémone. Bourguignon later used the film's title as her stage name.

In 1969, Garrel met German singer and actress Nico when she performed the song "The Falconer" for his film Le Lit de la Vierge (The Virgin's Bed). The couple soon started living together. He first cast Nico in his 1972 film The Inner Scar, which also featured her son Christian. Songs from the soundtrack were included in Nico's album Desertshore, which featured stills from the film on the front and back covers. Nico was featured in a number of Garrel's films after this. Their ten-year relationship ended in 1979.

Garrel and actress Brigitte Sy are the parents of actors Louis Garrel and Esther Garrel.

He is married to actress-writer Caroline Deruas.

On 30 August 2023, Garrel was accused of sexual harassment by five actresses, including Anna Mouglalis and Marie Vialle.

== Filmography ==
Year	Title	Notes
1964	Les Enfants désaccordés	Short; also editor
1965	Droit de visite	Short
1968	Marie pour mémoire	Also editor
1968	Anémone	Also actor
1968	La Concentration	Also producer/co-editor/art director
1968	Le Révélateur	Also editor/producer
1968	Actua 1	Short
1969	Le Lit de la Vierge (The Virgin's Bed)	features Nico's song "The Falconer"; also actor/editor/producer
1972	La Cicatrice intérieure (The Inner Scar)	Starring Nico; also actor/editor/producer
1972	Athanor	Starring Nico; short, also editor/producer
1974	Les Hautes Solitudes (The High Solitudes)	Starring Nico; also editor/producer
1975	Un ange passe (An Angel Passes)	Starring Nico; also producer/cinematographer/editor
1975	Le Berceau de cristal (The Crystal Cradle)	Starring Nico; also actor/editor/producer/cinematographer
1978	Voyage au jardin des morts (Journey to the Garden of the Dead)	Starring Nico; also editor/producer
1979	Le Bleu des origines (The Blue of the Origins)	Starring Nico; also actor/cinematographer/editor/producer
1982	L'Enfant secret	Shot in 1979, not completed until 1982; also actor/editor/producer
1983	Liberté, la nuit	Also editor
1984	"Rue Fontaine"	Segment of Paris vu par... vingt ans après
1985	Elle a passé tant d'heures sous les sunlights...	features Nico's song "All Tomorrow's Parties"; also editor/producer/actor
1989	Les Ministères de l'art	Documentary
1989	Les Baisers de secours	Also actor
1991	J'entends plus la guitare	
1993	La Naissance de l'amour (The Birth of Love)	
1996	Le Cœur fantôme (The Phantom Heart)	
1999	Le Vent de la nuit (Night Wind)	
2001	Sauvage Innocence (Wild Innocence)	
2004	Les Amants réguliers (Regular Lovers)	
2008	La Frontière de l'aube (Frontier of Dawn)	
2011	Un été brûlant (A Burning Hot Summer)	
2013	La Jalousie (Jealousy)	
2015	L'Ombre des femmes (In the Shadow of Women)	
2017	L'Amant d'un jour (Lover for a Day)	
2020	Le Sel des larmes (The Salt of Tears)	
2023	The Plough	Silver Bear for Best Director winner

== Sources ==
- "Philippe Garrel", Senses Of Cinema website
- "Philippe Garrel", Strictly Film School
- "Philippe Garrel", New York Times movie entry
- Interview
