= Caroline Deruas =

French film director

Caroline Deruas is a French film director. She directed Stereo Girls and L'Indomptée, which won the award for Best Original Score at the 2016 Les Arcs Film Festival.
