= India Hair =

French actress (born 1987)

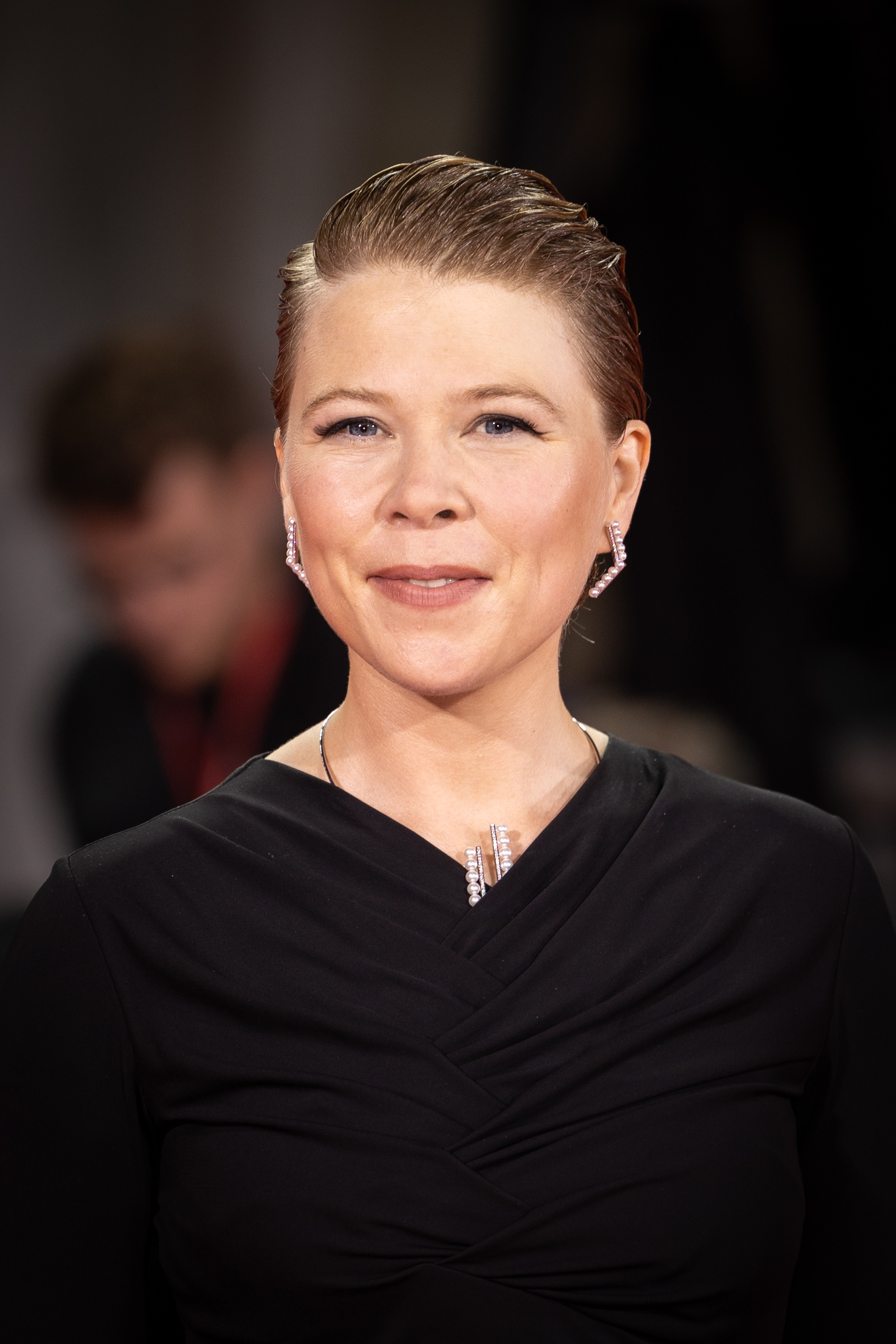
- Hair in 2024
- Born: 1987 (age 38–39); Saumur, Maine-et-Loire, France
- Occupation: Actress
- Years active: 2009–present

India Hair (born 1987) is a French actress. Most known for her performances in Camille Rewinds (2012), Staying Vertical (2016), Mandibles (2021) and Three Friends (2024).

== Early life ==
Hair was born in Saumur a town in western France, to an American father and an English mother.

She graduated from the regional conservatory of Nantes in 2007 and the Conservatoire national supérieur d'art dramatique in Paris.

== Career ==
She has worked in film and theater. She has also appeared in the television series Boulevard du Palais.

=== Filmography ===
Year	Title	Role	Director	Notes
2011	Avant l'aube	Maud	Raphaël Jacoulot	
2012	Camille Rewinds	Alice	Noémie Lvovsky	Lumière Award for Most Promising Actress; Nominated - César Award for Most Promising Actress
2012	Peinture fraîche	Manon	Gilles Serrand	Short
2012	Boulevard du Palais	Juliette Roussel	Marc Angelo	TV series (1 episode)
2013	Petit matin	Alice	Christophe Loizillon	Short
2014	High Society	Manon	Julie Lopes-Curval	
2014	Divin Enfant	Sophie	Olivier Doran	
2014	Brèves de comptoir	The greedy woman	Jean-Michel Ribes	
2014	Jacky in Women's Kingdom	Corune	Riad Sattouf	
2014	Jour J	Adrienne	Julia Bunter	Short
2014	Truffaut au présent	Herself	Axelle Ropert	Short
2015	Chic!	Karine Lefort	Jérôme Cornuau	
2015	L'Astragale	Suzy	Brigitte Sy	
2015	Voiler la face	Enora	Ibtissem Guerda	Short
2016	Parisienne	Victoire	Danielle Arbid	
2016	La fine équipe	Milou	Magaly Richard-Serrano	
2016	Staying Vertical	Marie	Alain Guiraudie	
2017	Bloody Milk	Angélique	Hubert Charuel	
2017	Crash Test Aglaé	Aglaé Lanctot	Éric Gravel	
2017	Reinventing Marvin	Vanessa	Anne Fontaine	
2017	Demain et tous les autres jours	The psychologist	Noémie Lvovsky	
2017	Un peu après minuit	Suzanne	Jean-Raymond Garcia & Anne-Marie Puga	Short
2017	Rhapsody in Blueberry	Rhapsody	Gaëlle Denis	Short
2017	Lorraine ne sait pas chanter	Lorraine	Anna Marmiesse	Short
2017	La bête curieuse	Elodie	Laurent Perreau	TV movie
2017	Paris etc	Victoria	Zabou Breitman	TV series (7 episodes)
2019	Deux fils	The psychologist	Félix Moati	
2019	Qui m'aime me suive!	Sandra	José Alcala	
2019	Une intime conviction	Séverine Lacoste	Antoine Raimbault	
2019	Le coup des larmes	Florence	Clémence Poésy	Short
2019	La maladroite	Laetitia Dubois	Éléonore Faucher	TV movie
2019	Replay	Lisette	Matthias Castegnaro	TV series (1 episode)
2019	Capitaine Marleau	Chloé	Josée Dayan	TV series (1 episode)
2020	Poissonsexe	Lucie	Olivier Babinet	Nominated - César Award for Most Promising Actress
2020	Call My Agent!	Ulrika Desrosières	Marc Fitoussi	TV series (1 episode)
2021	Mandibles	Cécile	Quentin Dupieux	
2021	Les hautes herbes	Maud Lefort	Jérôme Bonnell	TV mini-series
2022	Annie Colère	Claudine	Blandine Lenoir	
2022	Sentinelle sud	Lucie	Mathieu Gérault	
2022	A Radiant Girl	Viviane	Sandrine Kiberlain	
2022	En même temps	Elise / Sandra	Benoît Delépine & Gustave Kervern	
2022	Des gens bien	Stéphane	Matthieu Donck, Benjamin d'Aoust, ...	TV series (4 episodes)
2023	The Line	Louise	Ursula Meier	
2023	All to Play For	Madame Henry	Delphine Deloget	
2023	Jeanne du Barry	Adélaïde of France	Maïwenn	
2023	Les petites victoires	Pauline	Mélanie Auffret	
2023	Queen Size		Avril Besson	Short
2023	Polar Park	Aurélie Poulidor	Gérald Hustache-Mathieu	TV series (6 episodes)
2024	Three Friends	Joan Belair	Emmanuel Mouret	
2025	That Summer in Paris (Le rendez-vous de l'été)		Valentine Cadic	
2025	Young Mothers	Morgane	Jean-Pierre and Luc Dardenne	
TBA	Bisons	Lena Humbert	Pierre Monnard	Post-Production
TBA	Planète B		Aude Léa Rapin	Post-Production
TBA	Les barbares		Julie Delpy	Post-Production
TBA	Les enfants sont rois	Lou	Léopold Legrand & Sébastien Marnier	TV series Post-Production

=== Theater ===
Year	Title	Author	Director
2009	Adrienne Lecouvreur	Ernest Legouvé & Eugène Scribe	Michel Fau
2010	4 Dry Feet	Ivana Sajko	Urszula Mikos
2010	Der jüngste Tag	Ödön von Horváth	Ludmilla Dabo
2011	Un bateau pour les poupées	Milena Markovic	Marilyn Leray & Marc Tsypkine de Kerblay
2012	Everyone Wants to Live	Hanoch Levin	Vincent Menjou-Cortès & Amélie Porteu de la Morandière
2012–14	Mr Puntila and His Man Matti	Bertolt Brecht	Guy-Pierre Couleau
2014–15	Les Névroses sexuelles de nos parents	Lukas Bärfuss	Marilyn Leray & Marc Tsypkine de Kerblay
2014–16	Contractions	Mike Bartlett	Anne Théron
2018	A Month in the Country	Ivan Turgenev	Alain Françon
2020	Ce qu’on n’a pas dit	Noémie de Lattre	Géraldine Martineau
2020	Est-ce que tu danses la nuit…	Christine Orban	Géraldine Martineau
2020	Il y a plus d’une bête dans la jungle	Anne Le Ny	Géraldine Martineau
