= L'Astragale =

L'Astragale may refer to:

- L'Astragale, a semi-autobiographical novel by Albertine Sarrazin
- L'Astragale (1968 film), a French film, inspired by the novel
- L'Astragale (2015 film), a French drama film, an adaptation of the novel
