= Marie-Armelle Deguy =

Marie-Armelle Deguy is a French actress, the daughter of poet and essayist Michel Deguy.

== Filmography ==
=== Cinema ===
- 1988: La Septième dimension by Laurent Dussaux
- 1988: Zanzibar by Christine Pascal
- 1988: L'Enfance de l'art by Francis Girod
- 1990: Lacenaire by Francis Girod
- 1991: Sushi Sushi by Laurent Perrin
- 1993: La Naissance de l'amour by Philippe Garrel
- 1997: Une femme très très très amoureuse by Ariel Zeitoun
- 1999: Une saison by Brigitte Coscas
- 1999: La vie ne me fait pas peur by Noémie Lvovsky
- 1999: La Tentation de l'innocence by Fabienne Godet
- 2001: Gregoire Moulin vs. Humanity by Artus de Penguern
- 2001: Liberté-Oléron by Bruno Podalydès
- 2002: A Private Affair by Guillaume Nicloux
- 2003: À la petite semaine by Sam Karmann
- 2006: I Do by Éric Lartigau
- 2007: La Môme by Olivier Dahan
- 2007: Have Mercy on Us All by Régis Wargnier
- 2009: La Sainte Victoire by François Favrat
- 2011: The Women on the 6th Floor by Philippe Le Guay
- 2012: Une place sur la terre by Fabienne Godet
- 2014: Maestro by Léa Fazer

=== Television ===
- 1984: Diderot by Philippe Leguay
- 1991: La haine sous abri by D.Giuliani
- 1992: Banco machinations by Gérard Vergez
- 1992: Aerenshehawhe by Jean Baudin
- 1992: Antoine Rives, juge du terrorisme by Philippe Lefevre
- 1995: La place royale by Benoît Jacquot
- 1995: L'allée du roi by Nina Companeez
- 1997: Petites by Noémie Lvovsky
- 1998: Profession profileur by Patrick Dewolf
- 1998: Crimes en série, episodes Nature Morte and Double spirale by Patrick Dewolf
- 1999: Joséphine, ange gardien, episode Une nouvelle vie by Philippe Monnier
- 1999: Brigade des mineurs, Suicide d'un adolescent by Michaela Watteaux
- 2000: Le complexe d'Olympe by Laurence Katrian
- 2001: Un Pique-nique chez Osiris by Nina Companeez
- 2002 and 2003: Crimes en série by Patrick Dewolf
- 2004: Louis la brocante, fifth season, episode Louis et la vie de château by Alain-Michel Blanc
- 2004: Julie Lescaut, 13th season, episode 9, by Bernard Uzan : Céline Hélier
- 2004: L'Instit, episode 46, Ma petite star by Bruno Dega
- 2006: Nos familles by Siegrid Alnoy
- 2007: Les Tricheurs by Laurent Carcélès
- 2008: Nos enfants chéris by Benoît Cohen
- 2008: Un flic by Patrick Dewolf
- 2009: Vénus et Apollon (season 2) by Tonie Marshall
- 2009: Julie Lescaut by Jérôme Navarro
- 2009: Le chasseur by Nicolas Cuche
- 2009: Les Bougons by Sam Karmann
- 2009: Les Bleus by Alain Tasma
- 2010: L'écornifleur by Philippe Bérenger
- 2010: Drôle de famille ! by Benoît d'Aubert
- 2010: Julie Lescaut, season 19, episode 2 Contre la montre by Jérôme Navarro: the judge
- 2011: Dans la peau d'une grande by Pascal Lahmani
- 2011: Le Bon samaritain by Bruno Garcia
- 2012: Passage du désir by Jérôme Foulon
- 2012: Caïn by Bertrand Arthuys, TV series
- 2013: Julie Lescaut, episode Cougar by Christian Bonnet
- 2013: Nicolas Le Floch by Philippe Bérenger
- 2014: Le Chapeau de Mitterrand by Robin Davis

== Dubbing ==
- 2008: Dorothy Mills by Agnès Merlet : Eileen McMahon (Ger Ryan)
- 2009: Lourdes by Jessica Hausner : Mme Huber (Linde Prelog)
- 2009: Dans la brume électrique by Bertrand Tavernier : Bootsie Robicheaux (Mary Steenburgen)
- 2011: The Solitude of Prime Numbers by Saverio Costanzo : Adèle (Isabella Rosellini)
- 2012: Hannah Arendt by Margarethe von Trotta : Mary McCarthy (Janet McTeer)
- 2012: Shadow Dancer by James Marsh : Ma (Bríd Brennan)
- 2014: Winter Sleep by Nuri Bilge Ceylan : Necla (Demet Akbağ)

== Theatre ==
- 1985: Le Misanthrope by Molière, directed by André Engel à la MC93 in Bobigny
- 1985 to 1988: pensionnaire de la Comédie-Française:
  - Les Femmes savantes by Molière, directed by Catherine Hiegel
  - Le Bourgeois gentilhomme by Molière, directed by Jean-Luc Boutté
  - Le Menteur by Pierre Corneille, directed by Alain Françon
  - The Balcony by Jean Genet, directed by Georges Lavaudant
- 1988: Sophonisbe by Pierre Corneille, directed by Brigitte Jaques at Théâtre national de Chaillot
- 1988 : La Nuit des chasseurs after Woyzeck by Georg Büchner, directed by André Engel at Théâtre national de la Colline in Paris, Théâtre du Huitième in Lyon, Théâtre des Amandiers in Nanterre et en tournée en France
- 1990 and 1991: Das Käthchen von Heilbronn by Heinrich von Kleist, directed by Isabelle Janier at Théâtre de la Tempête at La Cartoucherie in Paris
- 1990: La Dame de chez Maxim by Georges Feydeau, directed by Alain Françon at Théâtre du Huitième in Lyon et en tournée
- 1992: La Mort de Pompée by Pierre Corneille, directed by Brigitte Jaques at Théâtre de la commune in Aubervilliers
- 1992: La Place royale by Pierre Corneille, directed by Brigitte Jaques au Théâtre de la Commune in Aubervilliers
- 1993 and 1994: Agnès by Catherine Anne at Théâtre Gérard Philipe (Saint-Denis)
- 1994: Tchekhov actes III, by Anton Tchekhov, directed by Anastasiya Vertinskaya and Alexandre Kaliaguine at Théâtre des Amandiers
- 1994/1995: Angels in America by Tony Kushner, directed by Brigitte Jaques at Théâtre de la Commune
- 1996: Angels in America, 2nd part
- 1996: Surprise by Catherine Anne, directed by the author, Théâtre de l'Aquarium at la Cartoucherie
- 1997: Sertorius by Pierre Corneille, directed by Brigitte Jaques at Théâtre de la Commune
- 1998: Les Gens déraisonnables sont en voie de disparition by Peter Handke, directed by Christophe Perton at Théâtre national de la Colline
- 1999/2000: Love's Labour's Lost by William Shakespeare, directed by Emmanuel Demarcy-Mota at Théâtre de la Ville
- 2000: Hedda Gabler by Henrik Ibsen, directed by Brigitte Jaques at the Comédie de Genève
- 2001: A Message for the Broken Hearted by Gregory Motton, directed by Frédéric Bélier-Garcia at Théâtre de l'Aquarium at la Cartoucherie
- 2000: Cendres de cailloux by Daniel Danis, directed by Hughes Massignat at Théâtre Gérard-Philipe
- 2002: Viol by Danièle Sallenave, directed by Brigitte Jaques at Théâtre du Rond-Point in Paris
- 2002: L'Inattendu and Le Diable en partage, two plays by Fabrice Melquiot, directed by Emmanuel Demarcy-Mota at Théâtre de la Bastille in Paris
- 2003: Le Bonheur du vent by Catherine Anne, directed by the author at Théâtre de l'Est parisien
- 2004: Le Couloir by Philippe Minyana, directed by Frédéric Maragnani at Théâtre Ouvert in Paris
- 2005/2006: Le Cas Blanche-Neige by Howard Barker, directed by Frédéric Maragnani at Théâtre de Suresnes
- 2007: Man Equals Man by Bertold Brecht, directed by Emmanuel Demarcy-Mota at Théâtre de la Ville
- 2007: Jeux doubles by Cristina Comencini, directed by Claudia Stavisky at Théâtre des Célestins in Lyon, and revival in 2008 at Théâtre de la Commune
- 2008: revival of Le Cas Blanche-Neige at théâtre Odéon Berthier in Paris
- 2009/2010: La parisienne by Henry Becque, directed by Frédéric Maragnani at Théâtre de l'Ouest parisien
- 2011: Les retrouvailles by Arthur Adamov, directed by Gabriel Garran at Théâtre de la Tempête at la Cartoucherie
- 2011: The Princess of Montpensier by Madame de La Fayette, directed by Jacques Vincey at Théâtre de l'Ouest parisien
- 2012: Le bourgeois gentilhomme by Molière, directed by Catherine Hiegel at Centre national de création d'Orléans and at Théâtre de la Porte Saint-Martin in Paris
- 2013: Quartett by Heiner Muller, directed by Florent Siaud at Théâtre La Chapelle in Montréal in Quebec
- 2014: Agnès by Catherine Anne and L'École des femmes by Molière, directed by Catherine Anne au Théâtre d'Ivry-Antoine Vitez: rôle du père et Arnolphe
- 2015: Trissotin or Les Femmes savantes by Molière, directed by Macha Makeïeff at Nuits de Fourvière
- 2015/2016: Les Caprices de Marianne by Alfred de Musset, directed by Frédéric Bélier-Garcia at Nouveau théâtre d'Angers and at Théâtre de la Tempête at La Cartoucherie and on tour
- 2015/2016: Agnès by Catherine Anne and L'École des femmes by Molière, directed by Catherine Anne at Théâtre d'Ivry-Antoine Vitez and on tour

== Honours ==
- 2014: Meilleur Second Rôle Féminin au Festival Jean Carmet de Moulins (Prix du Jury) for her part in Une place sur la Terre by Fabienne Godet
