= Rama Thiaw =

Senegalese filmmaker and screenwriter (born 1978)

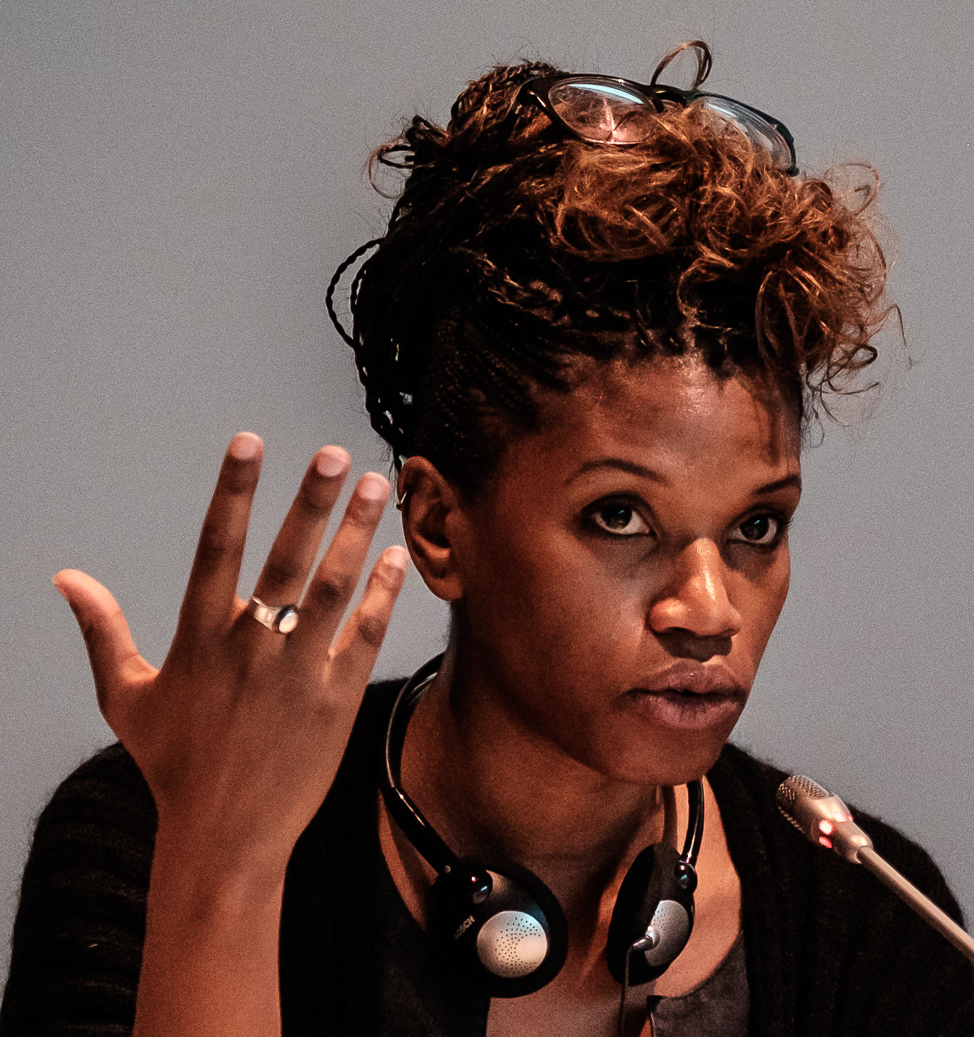
- Rama Thiaw, 2016
- Born: April 30, 1978 (age 48); Nouakchott, Mauritania
- Education: University of Paris 8
- Occupations: Filmmaker and Screenwriter

Rama Thiaw (born April 30, 1978) is a Senegalese filmmaker and screenwriter. She is known for her 2009 documentary Boul Fallé, la Voie de la lutte and her most recent documentary The Revolution Won’t be Televised (2016).

== Personal life and education ==
Rama Thiaw was born April 30, 1978, in Nouakchott, Mauritania to Mauritanian and Senegalese parents. Thiaw spent her first five years in Nouakchott (Quartier 5), before going to Pikine, in the suburb of Dakar, the capital of Senegal. After her parents’ divorce, she began splitting her time living in Senegal and France. Thiaw obtained a master's degree in International Economics at the Sorbonne in Paris. She then began to develop an interest in cinema, which led her to receive a diploma in filmmaking from the University of Paris 8 and later on, another master's degree at the University of Paris 3 at Censier Daubenton.

== Career ==
After completing her post-secondary education, Thiaw met with Algerian filmmaker Mohamed Boumari (assistant on the film La Bataille d’Alger) in 2002 with whom she participated in a production workshop. Thereafter, Thiaw collaborated with Zaléa TV where she made a series of film portraits on the inhabitants of the French commune, Aubervilliers and their poor housing conditions. This series was then followed up by a 15-minute documentary short titled Les jeunes de quartier et la religion.

Thiaw was the assistant of communications of Fabienne Godet's producer, on the film Burnt Out starring Marion Cotillard in 2006.

While still in France, Thiaw met French producer Philippe Lacôte who agreed to work with her on what would be Thiaw's first feature-length documentary film. Her film Boul Fallé, la Voie de la lutte was released in 2009. The film follows the “revival of traditional wrestling” in the suburbs of Dakar, where Thiaw grew up and “considers the sport’s influence in terms of the recent social and political transformations in Senegal” revolving around the Senegalese Independence. Additional to creating parallels between Senegal's wrestling and politics, Thiaw draws upon the expression found in Senegalese reggae and hip hop.

In 2010, Thiaw began production on her second documentary feature entitled The Revolution Won’t be Televised (2016), the title based on the poem by musician Gil Scott-Heron. This second work maintained the political and social Senegalese discourse as her previous film, however revolving primarily around the rise of the apolitical group “Y’en a Marre” (We’re Fed Up”), led by rappers Thiat and Kilifeu. The documentary followed Y’en a Marre's protests against President Abdoulaye Wade’s continuous run for presidency. The Revolution Won't be Televised was screened at the Berlin International Film Festival in February 2016, winning the Fipresci Prize and a special mention in the Caligari Filmpreis.

== Filmography ==
- Boul Fallé, la Voie de la lutte, 2009, director Rama Thiaw. Wassakara Productions.
- The Revolution Won't be Televised, 2016, director Rama Thiaw. Bout Fallé Images.
