= 3rd Globes de Cristal Awards =

- Date: 11 February 2008
- Site: Le Lido, Paris, France
- Hosted by: Xavier de Moulins; Élisabeth Quin

Television coverage
- Network: Paris Première

The 3rd Globes de Cristal Award ceremony honoured the best French movies, actors, actresses, plays, concerts, novels, singers, TV series, exhibitions and fashion designers of 2006 and took place on 11 February 2008. The ceremony was chaired by Bernard-Henri Lévy.

== Winners and nominees ==
The winners are denoted in bold.

=== Cinema ===
Best Film
- **Persepolis** – **Marjane Satrapi & Vincent Paronnaud**
- La Vie en rose – Olivier Dahan
- A Secret – Claude Miller
- 2 Days in Paris – Julie Delpy
- The Diving Bell and the Butterfly – Julian Schnabel
Best Actor
- **Romain Duris** – **Molière**
- Jean-Pierre Marielle – Let's Dance
- Vincent Lindon – Those Who Remain
- Mathieu Amalric – The Diving Bell and the Butterfly
- Louis Garrel – Love Songs
Best Actress
- **Cécile de France** – **A Secret**
- Marion Cotillard – La Vie en rose
- Isabelle Carré – Anna M.
- Julie Depardieu – A Secret
- Ludivine Sagnier – Love Songs

=== Television ===
Best TV Series / TV Movie
- **René Bousquet ou Le grand arrangement** – **Laurent Heynemann**
Best Documentary
- **Elle s'appelle Sabine** – **Sandrine Bonnaire**

=== Theater ===
Best Play
- **Good Canary** – **John Malkovich**
Best Musical
- **L'Amour / La Danse** – **Maurice Béjart**
Best One Man Show
- **Anne Roumanoff** – **Anne a 20 ans**

=== Literature ===
Best Novel or Essay
- **La stratégie des antilopes** – **Jean Hatzfeld**
Best Comic Book
- **La vie secrète des jeunes** – **Riad Sattouf**

=== Music ===
Best Female Singer
- **Rose** – **Rose**
Best Male Singer
- **Thomas Dutronc** – **Comme un manouche sans guitare**

=== Others ===
Best Exhibition
- **Gustave Courbet au Grand Palais**
Best Architect or Designer
- **Arik Levy**
Best Fashion Designer
- **Alber Elbaz**

=== Special ===
Honorary Globe
- **Ayaan Hirsi Ali**

== See also ==
- 33rd César Awards
