= The Arab of the Future =

Autobiographical graphic novel series by Riad Sattouf

- Date: 2015
- Page count: 160 pages
- Publisher: Metropolitan Books

Creative team
- Writer: Riad Sattouf
- Artist: Riad Sattouf

Original publication
- Language: French

The Arab of the Future (Note: Full title: A Childhood in the Middle East, 1978–1984: A Graphic Memoir) (French: L'Arabe du futur) is a graphic memoir by French cartoonist Riad Sattouf. The work recounts Sattouf's childhood growing up in France, Libya and Syria in the 1970s, '80s, and '90s. The first volume of L'Arabe du futur won the 2015 Fauve d’Or prize for best graphic novel at the Angoulême International Comics Festival.

Eventually another version was released which cut out some details but combined all six books into one.

Sattouf's father influenced the title of the memoir through his ideal of raising his son as an "Arab of the future." Early in the story, the elder Sattouf proclaims, "I'd change everything among the Arabs. I'd force them to stop being bigots, to educate themselves, and to enter into the modern world. I'd be a good President."

Purposefully written from the perspective of a child, Sattouf employs simplistic yet comprehensive drawings that are more rudimentary than, yet not entirely dissimilar to, his other works such as La vie secrète des jeunes, his column in the famous satirical French magazine Charlie Hebdo. Both The Arab of the Future and La Vie Secrète des Jeunes are written from Sattouf's point of view, with the former describing his childhood and the latter his daily observations as an adult. Although both appear autobiographical, at least one reviewer calls into question elements of Sattouf's life story and family history. The final volume was released in November 2022.

== Plot ==
=== Vol. 1: 1978–1984 ===
The Arab of the Future begins in France, where Riad Sattouf is born in 1978. He describes himself as a "perfect" little boy with "platinum-blonde hair" and "bright puppy-dog eyes." Riad is the eldest son of Clémentine, a reserved French woman, and Abdul-Razak Sattouf, a flamboyant Sunni-Syrian man. They met when Clémentine took pity on Abdul-Razak's clueless failure to attract a friend of hers.

A major theme of the novel is how young Riad looks up to his father as a hero. Abdul-Razak, however, is portrayed as a complex character, being educated, ambitious and a loving father, yet also hypocritical, sexist, racist, and simultaneously authoritarian towards his wife and children yet almost infantile in his relationships with his mother and elder brother. Abdul-Razak appears particularly conflicted over religion; he prefers to describe himself as a secular modernizer (he drinks wine, eats pork, and does not pray) but he also exhorts his son to respect God and to learn to read the Qur'an, seemingly motivated by the pressure of his conservative family and Syrian society.

With Clémentine transcribing his words and "rendering them intelligible," Abdul-Razak obtains a Ph.D. in history from the Sorbonne. In 1980, he moves the family to Libya after accepting a job as an associate professor. (He is paid in US dollars, with the funds sent to an account in the Channel Islands.)

Prime Minister Muammar Gaddafi has abolished private property, meaning all unoccupied housing is free for the taking. This causes the Sattouf family to lose their first residence when a policeman's family claims it. They are forced to move into a large apartment block described as a "ghetto for expatriates." Riad befriends with two neighbor children: Abani, an Indian girl, and Adnan, a Yemeni boy. Despite his very young age, Riad observes the propaganda of the Gaddafi regime and frequent food scarcity and rationing. The family remains in Libya for two years, during which Riad's grandmother and uncle visit them from Syria. When Gaddafi's state of the popular masses declares new laws requiring people of different social classes to swap occupations, Abdul-Razak fears losing his teaching job, and the family leaves Libya in 1982.

The family returns to France for a short period. Riad meets his recently divorced, womanizing maternal grandfather, then they stay with Riad's grandmother in Brittany. She teaches him about the family's history and her own physically abusive grandmother. She draws parallels between the rural France of the past, exemplified by her elderly neighbor who lives in extremely rustic conditions, and the developing Arab world of the modern era. Riad attends the local kindergarten, where he is praised for his drawings of French president Georges Pompidou and a sculpture of a bull. While in France, Clémentine gives birth to Riad's younger brother, Yahya.

Abdul-Razak obtains a teaching job in Syria and the family moves to his hometown Teir Maalah, near Homs. Riad encounters severe bullying, in which two cousins accuse him of being Jewish and mercilessly torment him—seemingly because of his blond hair and foreign mother. The cousins' enmity appears to be entangled with a financial dispute between their father and Riad's father. Riad also witnesses strict segregation of genders and sects, media censorship, animal abuse, corruption, poor sanitation, and crippling poverty. Riad befriends Wael and Mohammad, two other cousins who teach him Syrian Arabic; they try to protect him from the two bullies, who are their uncles though around the same age. Riad observes the cult of personality surrounding Hafez al-Assad, who he sees as more sinister than Libya's Gaddafi. Abdul-Razak wants Riad to begin school, but Clémentine fears he is too young—then forbids it entirely after witnessing a group of boys torture and kill a puppy for sport.

The Sattouf family returns suddenly to Brittany. Riad's grandmother has remarried and her new husband takes a liking to Riad. Riad is relieved and expects that the family will remain in France for good. The family travels to the Bailiwick of Jersey to retrieve Abdul-Razak's Libyan salary, in cash, from his offshore bank account. Riad becomes terrified when his father—who now has money to build his dream villa—makes plans to return to Syria, knowing that he will have to attend school there and face his bullies.

=== Vol. 2: 1984–1985 ===
The Sattouf family moves back to Teir Maalah in Syria, where Riad attends the local school. One of Abdul-Razak's cousins is a general in the Syrian army. He takes the Sattouf family to visit the ruins of Palmyra. Another cousin, Leila, is unmarried but becomes pregnant. When her father and brother find out, they kill her to preserve the family's honor. The killers are denounced to the police and imprisoned, but their sentence is later commuted and they are released after a few months.

=== Vol. 3: 1985–1987 ===
Abdul-Razak works as a professor in Syria. Among his students is one of the bodyguards of Hafez al-Assad. Abdul-Razak is torn between his desire to be an enlightened modern man and his loyalty to his conservative family. Clémentine and the children travel to Brittany for her to give birth to her third child, Fadi. After they return to Syria, Abdul-Razak has made his peace with his family. He agrees to have Riad circumcised. At the end of the book, he announces that he will begin a new job in Saudi Arabia.

=== Vol. 4: 1987–1992 ===
Clémentine has refused to take the family to Saudi Arabia, so instead she and the children are living in Brittany without Abdul-Razak. At the end of the school term, he pays them a surprise visit and takes them on holiday to Syria. The following year, Clémentine and the children again spend the school year in Brittany, then join Abdul-Razak in Syria for the holidays. He has become a more devout muslim, and strongly disapproves of Clémentine's secular ideas. By the end of the volume, tensions between Clémentine and Abdul-Razak lead to their breakup. Abdul-Razak takes the family's savings and their youngest child Fadi to Syria, leaving Clémentine in Brittany with the two older children.

=== Vol. 5: 1992–1994 ===
Riad recounts his adolescent school years in Rennes. He begins to read more widely, including the novels of H. P. Lovecraft, Allan Kardec's writings on spiritism, and classic French-language comic book authors Moebius, Philippe Druillet, and Enki Bilal. Clémentine is desperate to recover Fadi, but the French authorities are unable to help her because she is still married. By the end of the book she has secured a divorce and legal custody of the children, though Abdul-Razak is still appealing the decision. Abdul-Razak visits France, and by chance Clémentine's mother spots him in a bookshop. He agrees to meet Clémentine and the children, and after trying to persuade them to return with him to Syria, he agrees instead to bring Fadi back.

== Sensory symbolism ==
Sattouf employs a repeating pattern of color schemes throughout the comic. Basic line drawings are black and white, and a general color tint signifies the location of the events. Certain objects and speech bubbles have thematic coloring. Red is regularly applied to loud speech, danger and violence, while non-verbal noises (hisses and growls, for example) are green.

France is tinted light blue, and its art and media (such as radio, photographs and sculpture) are colored bright red. Libya's panels are tinted mustard yellow, while bright green is applied to TV broadcasts, loud noises, Libyan flags, portraits of Muammar Gaddafi and, of course, Gaddafi's manifesto The Green Book. Syria is represented by light pink. Its electronic music and speech bubbles are green; red is applied to television and the speech of a mythical creature in a folktale. Finally, a short time spent on the Bailiwick of Jersey is tinted light green.

Smell is also vividly represented throughout the novel. The young Riad associates new places and especially new people with their smells, ranging from perfume and incense to sweat, spoiled food, and flatulence. These odors tend to convey the quality of relationships, with Sattouf explaining, "the people whose odor I preferred were generally the ones who were the kindest to me. I find that’s still true today.”

== Critical reception ==
The Arab of the Future has received widespread critical acclaim and is considered an instant classic among graphic memoirs. The text of the first volume has been translated into sixteen languages, demonstrating its international appeal.

Michel Hazanavicius, Academy Award-winning director of The Artist, proclaims “Seriously funny and penetratingly honest, Riad Sattouf tells the epic story of his eccentric and troubled family. Written with tenderness, grace, and piercing clarity, The Arab of the Future is one of those books that transcend their form to become a literary masterpiece."

The New York Times described the graphic memory as, “Exquisitely illustrated, and filled with experiences of misfortune bordering on the farcical,… a disquieting yet essential read." Also writing for the Times, Laila Lalami highlights the book's portrayal of Sattouf's father, and his gradual and uneven path from a young idealist to an authoritarian, yet impotent, hypocrite. Many reviewers note that, for all his faults, the elder Sattouf remains a compelling and interesting figure, with Adam Schatz writing for The New Yorker: "For all his rants against Jews, Africans, and, above all, the Shia, [Abdel-Razak] remains strangely endearing, a kind of Arab Archie Bunker."
