= Vincent Lacoste =

French actor (born 1993)

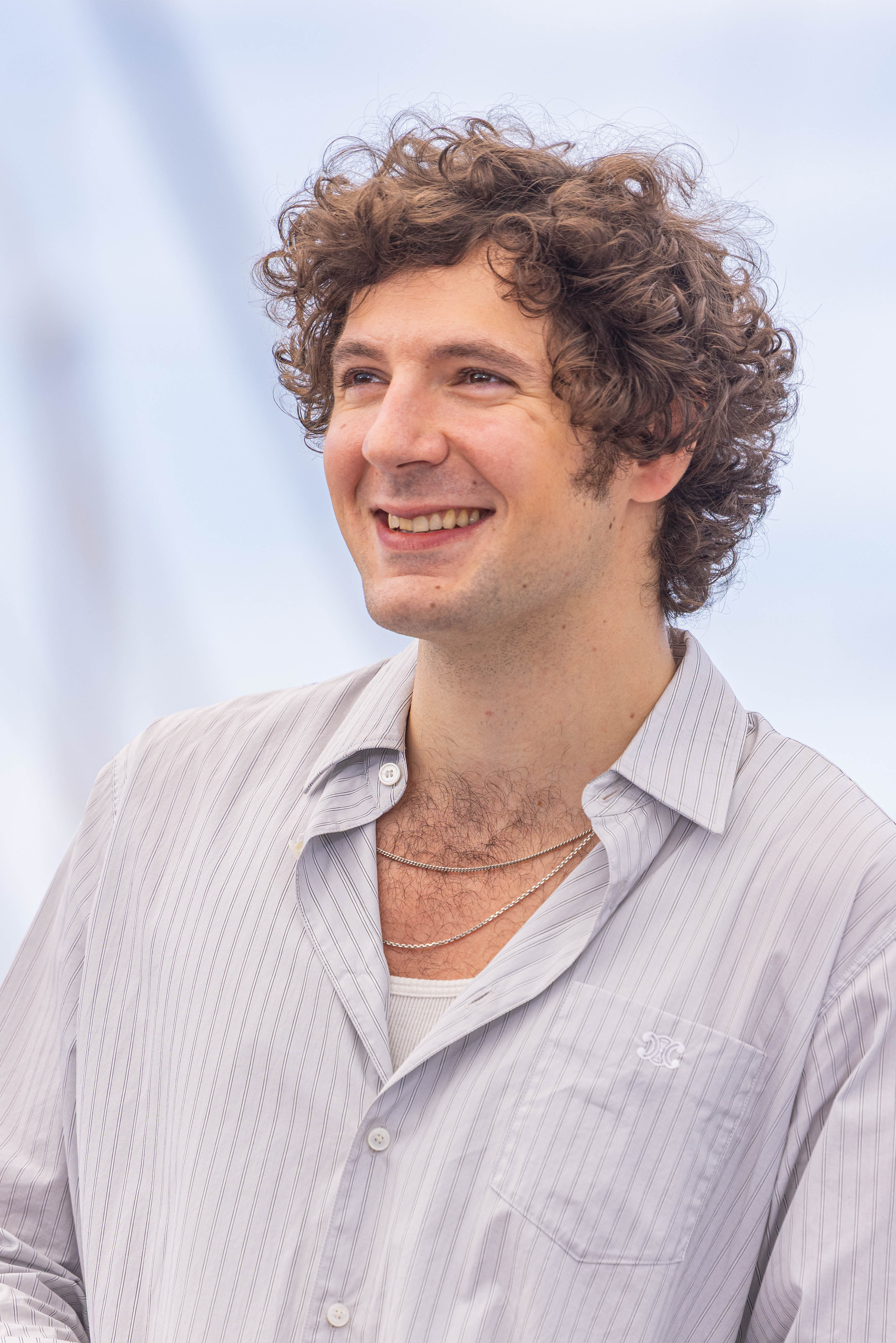
- Lacoste at the 2025 Cannes Film Festival
- Born: 3 July 1993 (age 33); Paris, France
- Occupation: Actor
- Years active: 2009–present

Vincent Lacoste (born 3 July 1993) is a French actor. He is best known for his work with auteur filmmakers, including as Eden (2014), In Bed with Victoria (2016), Sorry Angel (2018), Amanda (2018) and Lost Illusions (2021). For the latter film, he was awarded the César Award for Best Supporting Actor.

== Career ==
Lacoste began his acting career at the age of 15, playing the lead role of Hervé in the film The French Kissers. The role won him the Lumière Award for Best Male Revelation. Lacoste is featured in the graphic novel Le jeune acteur, which recounts how he was selected for the role.

Lacoste was awarded the Prix Patrick Dewaere in 2016.

== Filmography ==
Year	Title	Role	Notes
2009	The French Kissers	Hervé	Winner – Lumière Award for Most Promising Actor; Nominated – César Award for Most Promising Actor
2011	Au bistro du coin	Jules	
2011	Low Cost	Dimitri	
2011	Skylab	Christian	
2011	Play It Like Godard	JC	
2011	De l'huile sur le feu	Pierrick	
2012	Camille Rewinds	Vincent	
2012	Asterix and Obelix: God Save Britannia	Goudurix	
2014	Jacky in Women's Kingdom	Jacky	
2014	Hippocrate	Benjamin Barois	Nominated – César Award for Best Actor
2014	Eden	Thomas	
2015	Diary of a Chambermaid	Monsieur Georges	
2015	Lolo	Lolo	
2015	Parisienne	Rafaël	
2015	The Very Private Life of Mister Sim	Jacques Sim (20 years old)	
2016	Saint-Amour	Mike	
2016	Tout de suite maintenant	Xavier	
2016	In Bed with Victoria	Sam	Nominated – César Award for Best Supporting Actor
2017	Sahara	Gary	
2018	Sorry Angel	Arthur	
2018	Amanda	David	Nominated – César Award for Best Actor; Nominated – Lumière Award for Best Actor
2018	Première Année	Antoine	
2019	Deux Fils	Joachim	
2019	On a Magical Night	Richard Warrimer at 20 years old	
2019	Mes jours de gloire	Adrien	
2020	Delete History	sex taper	
2020	De nos frères blessés	Fernand Iveton	
2021	Lost Illusions	Étienne Lousteau	Winner – César Award for Best Supporting Actor
2022	Smoking Causes Coughing	Methanol	
2022	Coma	Nicholas	Voice role
2022	Irma Vep	Edmond Lagrange	TV miniseries
2022	Winter Boy (Le Lycéen)	Quentin	
2023	Along Came Love (Le Temps d'aimer)	François Delambre	
2023	A Real Job	Benjamin	
2024	Beating Hearts	Jeffrey	
2025	The Seduction	Vicomte de Valmont	TV miniseries
2025	A Private Life	Julien Haddad-Park	
2026	Orange-Flavoured Wedding	Dominique	
2026	Forty Love		Post-production
