= Sushi Sushi =

- Sushi Sushi
- Directed by: Laurent Perrin
- Starring: André Dussollier; Jean-François Stévenin; Sandrine Dumas; Michel Aumont; Kentaro Matsuo; Éva Darlan
- Music by: Jorge Arriagada
- Release date: 19 June 1991 (France)
- Running time: 86 minutes
- Country: France
- Language: French

Sushi Sushi is a French film, released on 19 June 1991 and directed by Laurent Perrin.

== Synopsis ==
Fed up with university life, Maurice Hartmann leaves his studies and creates his own business: Sushi-Express, a Japanese food home delivery business. His artisanal methods and family craft drive the project towards bankruptcy. A businessman lends his hand to the business and delivers sushi using more industrial methods.

== Technical details ==
- Title : Sushi Sushi
- Director : Laurent Perrin
- Writer : Michka Assayas, Jacques Fieschi, Laurent Perrin and Jérôme Tonnerre
- Production :
- Production company :
- Music : Jorge Arriagada
- Photography : Dominique Le Rigoleur
- Editing :
- Decoration : Jacques Rouxel
- Country of origin : France
- Format : Colours - 1,85:1 - Dolby - 35 mm
- Genre : Comedy drama
- Length : 86 minutes
- Release date : 19 June 1991 (France)

== Starring ==
- André Dussollier : Maurice Hartmann
- Jean-François Stévenin : Richard Souriceau
- Sandrine Dumas : Claire
- Michel Aumont : Bertrand Casier
- Kentaro Matsuo : Kiyoshi
- Éva Darlan : Hélène
- Frédéric Deban : Manu
- Marie-Armelle Deguy : Magali
- Marianne Epin : Suzanne
- Jean-François Perrier : Pradère
- Aladin Reibel : Parmentier
- Pierre-Alain Chapuis : Vincent
- Catherine Frot : La banquière
- Pascal Aubier : Schlumpelmeyer
- Olivier Broche
- Jacky Nercessian
