= Anne Roumanoff =

French comedian and actress (born 1965)

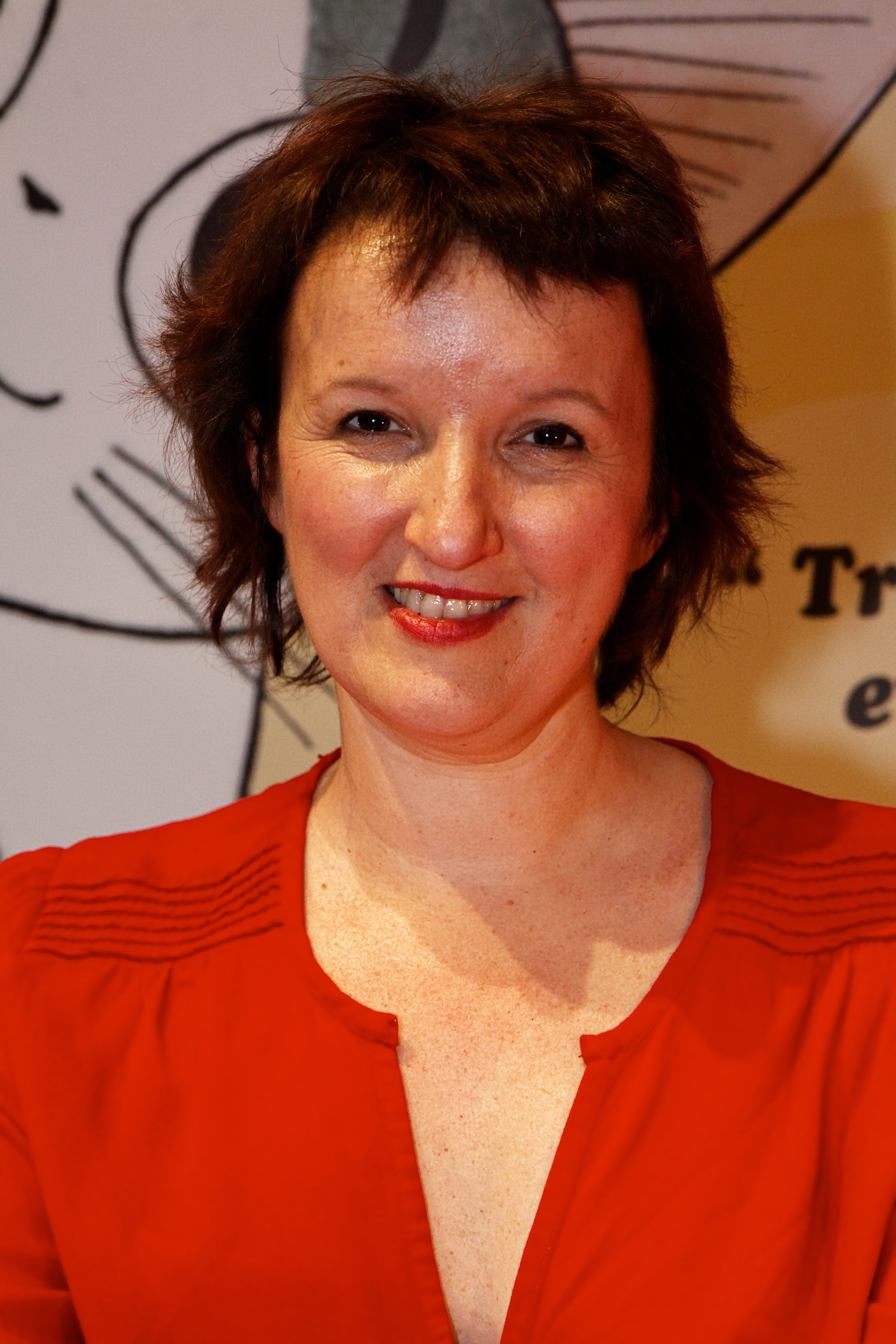
- Anne Roumanoff in 2011
- Born: September 25, 1965 (age 60); Paris, France
- Education: Institut d'Etudes Politiques de Paris
- Occupation: Comedian

Anne Roumanoff (born 25 September 1965 in Paris) is a French comedian and actress.

== Early life ==
Anne Leila Roumanoff was born on 25 September 1965 in Paris, France. Her grandparents on one side were Ashkenazi Jews from Russia, and on the other side Sepharadic Jews, from Morocco she is affiliated to Rabbi Haim Cohen of Fes.

Roumanoff attended her first theater school at the age of 12. She graduated from the Institut d'Etudes Politiques de Paris.

== Career ==
Roumanoff started her career in the television program La Classe on France 3, alongside Fabrice, Lagaf' and Jean-Marie Bigard in 1987. She became famous for her one-woman shows.

Roumanoff became part of the team of French TV show Rien à cirer on France Inter with Laurent Ruquier in 1991. In 1998, she celebrated her ten-year career at the Olympia.

In 2001, Roumanoff was the French voice of Coco la bouche in the animated feature Rugrats in Paris: The Movie. In 2003, her show Follement Roumanoff had a 13-month run at the Bobino Theater in Paris, then she started a tour in France and Quebec. In 2007, she celebrated her 20-year career with Anne a 20 ans at the Théâtre des Bouffes-Parisiens in Paris. From September 2007, she made a comic forum on the news, entitled On ne nous dit pas tout in the show Vivement Dimanche, hosted by Michel Drucker.

== Personal life ==
Roumanoff has a husband and two daughters, Alice Vaillant and Marie.

== Filmography ==
=== Cinema ===
- 1989 : La Passion de Bernadette, by Jean Delannoy
- 1990 : Promotion canapé, by Didier Kaminka
- 1991 : Le Fils du Mékong, by François Leterrier
- 1992 : Une journée chez ma mère, by Dominique Cheminal
- 1995 : Golden Boy, by Jean Pierre Vergne
- 2000 : Rugrats in Paris, by Stig Bergqvist

=== TV films ===
- 1990 : Cavale, by Serge Meynard
- 1991 : Vacances au purgatoire, by Marc Simenon
- 1996 : Des mouettes dans la tête, by Bernard Malaterre
- 1996 : Le censeur du lycée d'Épinal, by Marc Rivière
- 1997 : Une patronne de charme, by Bernard Uzan
- 2000 : Sa mère la pute, by Brigitte Rouan
- 2005 : L'homme qui voulait passer à la télé, by Amar Arhab and Pascal Legitimus
- 2005 : La famille Zapon, by Amar Arhab

== Bibliography ==
- Ca va être ta fête Maman !, Hors Collection, 2005, Paris (ISBN 978-2258067141)
- Le couple : Petits délices de la vie à deux, with Colette Roumanoff, Hors Collection, 2006, Paris (ISBN 978-2258070288)
- Belle, mince, sexy : Et puis quoi encore ?, Hors Collection, 2006, Paris (ISBN 978-2258072350)
- Portraits de femmes (et d'un homme), Fetjaine ed., Humour coll., 2007, Paris (ISBN 978-2354250324)
- On ne nous dit pas tout !, "Les chroniques de Radio Bistrot", Fetjaine ed., Humour coll., 2009, Paris (ISBN 978-2354251321)

== Decorations ==
- Globe de Cristal for Best One Man Show (2008)
- Officer of the Order of Arts and Letters (2015)
