= Three Friends (2024 film) =

2024 film directed by Emmanuel Mouret

- Promotional release poster
- French: Trois amies
- Directed by: Emmanuel Mouret
- Written by: Emmanuel Mouret; Carmen Leroi
- Produced by: Frédéric Niedermayer
- Starring: Camille Cottin; Sara Forestier; India Hair
- Cinematography: Laurent Desmet
- Edited by: Martial Salomon
- Music by: Benjamin Esdraffo
- Production companies: Moby Dick Films; Arte France Cinéma; Auvergne-Rhône-Alpes Cinéma
- Distributed by: Pyramide Distribution
- Release dates: 30 August 2024 (Venice); 6 November 2024 (France)
- Running time: 117 minutes
- Country: France
- Language: French
- Box office: $2.9 million

Three Friends (French: Trois amies) is a 2024 French romantic comedy drama film directed by Emmanuel Mouret, co-written with Carmen Leroi. It stars Camille Cottin, Sara Forestier, and India Hair as a trio of women with differing philosophies about romantic relationships.

The film had its world premiere in the main competition of the 81st Venice International Film Festival on 30 August 2024, where it was nominated for the Golden Lion. It was theatrically released in France by Pyramide Distribution on 6 November.

== Premise ==
Joan turns to her close friends Rebecca and Alice after the disappearance of Victor, her ex-lover and the father of her child. Meanwhile, Rebecca begins an affair with Alice's partner.

== Cast ==
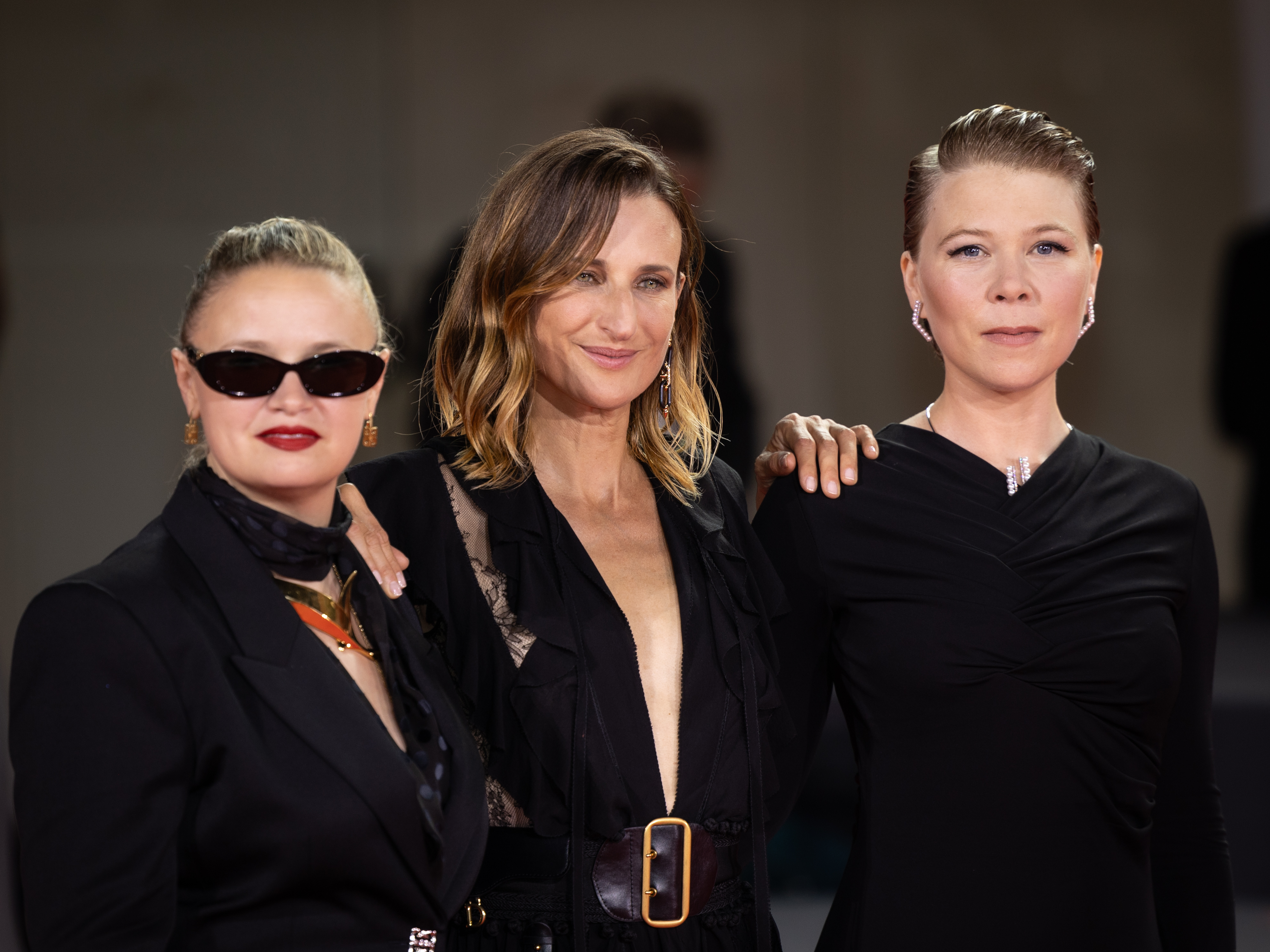
Three Friends leads Camille Cottin, Sara Forestier and India Hair

- Camille Cottin as Alice
- Sara Forestier as Rebecca Maillard
- India Hair as Joan Belair
- Vincent Macaigne as Victor Harzouian
- Damien Bonnard as Thomas Duval
- Grégoire Ludig as Éric
- Éric Caravaca as Stéphane Leroi
- Brice Fournier as Estate Agent

== Production ==
Principal photography began in late September 2023 and continued until November of that year.

== Release ==
Three Friends premiered at the 81st Venice International Film Festival on 30 August 2024. It was featured in the Limelight section of the 54th International Film Festival Rotterdam to be screened in February 2025.

== Reception ==
=== Box office ===
It grossed $2.9 million at the worldwide box office, including $2 million only in France.

=== Critical response ===
On the review aggregator website Rotten Tomatoes, 82% of 11 critics' reviews are positive, with an average rating of 6/10.
