= Albertine Sarrazin =

French author (1937-1967)

- Born: Albertine Damien; 17 September 1937; Algiers, French North Africa
- Died: 10 July 1967 (aged 29); Montpellier, France
- Occupation: Writer
- Spouse: Julien Sarrazin (m. 1959)
- Writing career
- Notable works: La Cavale (1965); L'Astragale (1964); La Traversière (1966); Poèmes (1969)

Albertine Sarrazin (17 September 1937 – 10 July 1967) was a French author. She was best known for her semi-autobiographical novel L'Astragale.

== Life and career ==
Albertine was born on 17 September 1937 in Algiers, French North Africa. Her teenaged Spanish mother abandoned her and left her with the Welfare Office, where officials named her Albertine Damien in honour of the saint of the day she was found on. At the age of 2 she was adopted by a French army physician and his wife who renamed her Anne-Marie. Following the family's move to Aix-en-Provence in 1947, she was raped by a male relative. Constant quarrels with her adoptive family led to an intense distaste for authority that stayed with her the rest of her life.

Although she was intelligent and did well in her studies, Albertine's family set to annul her adoption and in 1952 placed her in a reformatory school in Marseille, the Refuge of the Good Shepherd. She passed an examination to graduate from secondary school at the age of 16 before escaping the school and travelling to Paris where she reunited with Emilienne, a love interest from her school. Albertine worked as a prostitute and the pair were arrested in 1953 after a bungled armed robbery of a dress store. Sarrazin received a seven year sentence and was imprisoned at the Fresnes Prison. During her time in prison and at the reformatory at Doullens in Picardy, she started writing prose and poetry.

Incarcerated for four years, Sarrazin escaped from the Doullens reform school in April 1957. She broke her ankle during the escape and was picked up by Julien Sarrazin, a truck driver. The pair were both criminals and both went to prison following their arrest in September 1958. They were married on 7 February 1959 while Albertine was still imprisoned. The two continued to live lives of crime, spending time in and out of jail and keeping contact through letters.

Albertine was injured in a car accident in 1961. She and Julien were arrested for burglary the same year and she was given a sentence of two years. By 1964, Albertine was employed as a journalist in Alès when she was again arrested for petty theft. She completed her prison term in August 1965. They moved to the Cévennes region and bought a house in the countryside.

In prison, Sarrazin wrote her first novels, L'Astragale and La Cavale, which were published after her release in 1964 (the astragale of the title is the French word for the talus bone, which both she and the main character of her novel broke on their escapes from jail). Her works were bestsellers and she received invitations to appear on television. La Cavale, written in secret during her incarceration in 1961 and 1962, won the Prix des Quatre Jurys in 1966. Astragale was translated in English at that same time. Their success allowed the married couple to settle in Montpellier where she wrote her third story, La Traversière. The novel also performed well, but she died shortly afterwards from complications during kidney surgery.

Sarrazin died on 10 July 1967 in Montpellier, France. Her diaries and correspondence were published posthumously.

Sarrazin's novel L'Astragale was adapted to film in 1968 by Guy Casaril and in 2015 by Brigitte Sy.

== Bibliography ==
- La Cavale (1965)
- L'Astragale (1965; translated into English: 1966, 1968), adapted into films by Guy Casaril in 1968 and Brigitte Sy in 2015.
- La Traversière (1966)
- Poèmes (1969)
- Lettres à Julien (1971)
- Lettres de la Vie Littéraire (1965–67)
- Les Biftons de prison (1977)
- Journal de Fresne
