= A Place on Earth (2013 film) =

- Directed by: Fabienne Godet
- Starring: Benoît Poelvoorde; Ariane Labed
- Release date: 28 August 2013 (France)
- Running time: 100 minutes
- Countries: France; Belgium
- Language: French
- Budget: $4.5 million
- Box office: $530.000

A Place on Earth (French: Une place sur la Terre) is a 2013 French / Belgian drama film directed by Fabienne Godet. Benoît Poelvoorde won the Magritte Award for Best Actor for his performance as Antoine Dumas.

== Cast ==
- Benoît Poelvoorde as Antoine Dumas
- Ariane Labed as Elena Morin
- Max Baissette de Malglaive as Matéo
- Julie Moulier as Margot
- Marie-Armelle Deguy as Julia
- Thomas Coumans as Roman Morin
- Catherine Demaiffe as Maria
- Stéphanie Colpé as Maddy
- Brigitte Sy as Loraine Morin
- Jacques Spiesser as Monsieur Morin
