= Les Mains libres =

- Promotional poster
- Directed by: Brigitte Sy
- Written by: Brigitte Sy; Gaëlle Macé
- Produced by: Mathieu Bompoint; Claire Trinquet
- Starring: Ronit Elkabetz; Carlo Brandt; Noémie Lvovsky
- Cinematography: Frédéric Serve
- Edited by: Julie Dupré
- Music by: Daniel Mille
- Production companies: Mezzanine Films; Canal+; CinéCinéma; Centre National de la Cinématographie
- Distributed by: Chrysalis Films
- Release date: 16 June 2010 (France)
- Running time: 100 minutes
- Country: France
- Language: French
- Budget: €1.64m

Les Mains libres (The Free Hands) is a 2010 French drama film directed by Brigitte Sy. It stars Ronit Elkabetz, Carlo Brandt, and Noémie Lvovsky. It was released theatrically in France on 16 June 2010. It is a feature-length prequel to Sy's 2008 short film, L'Endroit idéal.

== Plot ==
Barbara (Elkabetz) is a filmmaker developing a film written and acted by prison inmates in Paris. She defies legal boundaries, unleashing a series of consequences when she forms a deep romantic relationship with Michel (Brandt), an inmate involved in the film project.

== Cast ==
- Ronit Elkabetz as Barbara
- Carlo Brandt as Michel
- Noémie Lvovsky as Rita
- Camille Figuereo as Chloé
- Adama Doumbia as Roel
- Denis Maréchal as Fifi
- Gurgon Kyap as James
- Abdelhafid Metalsi as Mouloud
- Xavier Legrand as Laurent
- Ahmed M'Hemdi as Bouda
- François Négret as Sergueï
- Alain Ollivier as Le directeur de la prison
- Sasha Andres as Marie-Pierre
- Dominique Frot as La juge
- Brigitte Sy as Le femme blonde

== Reception ==
Thomas Baurez of L'Express, described it as "intelligent, gracious and humble.. a love story of the purest sense of the term." Lucie Calet of Le Nouvel Observateur, continued that it is a "Greek tragedy" of "great dignity." Le Figaro praised the depiction of the tangible reality of the film as well as Eliabetz' superb and dark performance, evoking traits of the Madonna.

The film was warmly received by The New Yorker; "with calm and nuanced images, Sy captures emotionally unguarded characters locked in the gaze of prying eyes; with brusque, quiet action and incisive, tight-lipped dialogue, she sets a gripping plot in motion while keeping it close to the heart."
