= L'Endroit idéal =

- Directed by: Brigitte Sy
- Written by: Brigitte Sy
- Produced by: Mathieu Bompoint
- Starring: Ronit Elkabetz
- Cinematography: Frédéric Serve
- Edited by: Julie Dupré
- Music by: Daniel Mille
- Production companies: Mezzanine Films; Ville de Paris; Arte France; Centre National de la Cinématographie
- Distributed by: Mezzanine Films
- Release date: 2008
- Running time: 30 minutes
- Country: France
- Language: French

L'Endroit idéal is a 2008 French featurette starring Ronit Elkabetz. It was written and directed by Brigitte Sy. It was later adapted into the 2010 feature-length film, Les mains libres.

== Plot synopsis ==
Barbara (Elkabetz), a film director, is indicted by the police over allegations that she laundered money to Michel (Brandt). Michel is a prisoner that met Barbara during her film project in the prison. During this time they have engaged in an illicit affair and fallen in love. She is forbidden to see Michel again. Yet one year on the couple get married.

== Cast ==
- Ronit Elkabetz as Barbara
- Carlo Brandt as Michel
- Noémie Lvovsky as Rita
- Magali Magne as Policière
- Bertrand Barre as Policier
- Alain N'Diaye as Médecin 1
- Florence Janas as Nathalie
- Daniel Amadou as Policier
- Pascal Ternisien as Inspecteur
- Richard Acket as Officier PJ
- Philippe Vallet officier PJ
- Jean Miez as Beau-père Nathalie
- Philippe Lemaire as Avocat

== Festivals and awards ==
The short film was screened at a series of international festivals;

- Clermont-Ferrand International Short Film Festival
- Istanbul International Short Film Festival (official selection)
- Rio de Janeiro International Short Film Festival (special programme)
- Festival international de films de femmes
- Lutin Short Film Award (nomination - fictional films)
