= Guess Who's Calling! =

Guess Who's Calling
- Film poster
- French: Le Répondeur
- Directed by: Fabienne Godet
- Written by: Claire Barré; Fabienne Godet
- Based on: Le Répondeur by Luc Blanvillain
- Starring: Salif Cissé; Denis Podalydès
- Cinematography: Éric Blanckaert
- Edited by: Florent Mangeot; Florent Vassault
- Music by: Éric Neveux
- Production company: Le Bureau
- Distributed by: Tandem
- Release date: 14 January 2025 (Alpe d'Huez)
- Running time: 102 minutes
- Country: France
- Language: French

Guess Who's Calling! (French: Le Répondeur, lit. "The Answering Machine") is a French comedy film, directed by Fabienne Godet and released in 2025.

The film stars Salif Cissé as Baptiste, a comedy impressionist who is struggling to break through in his career, and Denis Podalydès as Pierre, a writer who is struggling to minimize life distractions as he works on his new novel. After Pierre has the idea to hire Baptiste as a human answering machine, impersonating him on the phone so that he can avoid talking to people himself, career and personal complications ensue when Baptiste begins to improvise the things he says to Pierre's callers.

The cast also includes Clara Bretheau, Aure Atika, Manon Clavel, Ismaël Sy Savané, Harrison Arevalo, Serge Postigo, Thierry Bosc and Camille Cayol in supporting roles.

== Production ==
The film was shot in summer 2023. It was adapted from Luc Blanvillain's 2020 novel.

== Distribution ==
The film premiered on 14 January 2025 at the L'Alpe d'Huez Film Festival, before going into commercial release in French theatres on 4 June.

It was screened in September 2025 at the 2025 Cinéfest Sudbury International Film Festival in Canada.

It was screen in March 2026 at Rendez-Vous with French Cinema 2026, Film Society at Lincoln Center, New York.

== Critical response ==
Aurore Engelen of Cineuropa wrote that "At first glance, Guess Who Is Calling seems to be based on a wholly implausible premise, but it only takes one scene led by Salif Cissé (discovered in the brilliant All Hands on Deck) – in which he tries to copy the writer’s voice - for us to suspend all manner of disbelief, as happens with any good fiction film. He’s extraordinary, both in his imitations and in his subtle portrayal of a kind of masculinity which embraces its vulnerabilities. A special sort of intimacy subsequently develops between the two men, a kind of circumstantial fusion, which takes the time it needs to morph into friendship. The film is indisputably a comedy, but it nonetheless flirts with a range of genres, from buddy movie through to romcom, gleefully playing with the idea of false identity and doubles to create dramatic tension and comical situations."

== Awards ==
At Alpe d'Huez, the film won the Prix du Public.
