= L'Astragale (1968 film) =

- Directed by: Guy Casaril
- Written by: Guy Casaril
- Based on: L'Astragale, by Albertine Sarrazin
- Produced by: Pierre Braunberger
- Edited by: Nicole Gauduchon
- Music by: Joss Baselli
- Production companies: Les Films de la Pléiade; CCC Filmkunst (Berlin)
- Release date: 1968
- Country: France
- Language: French

L'Astragale is a French film directed by Guy Casaril and released in 1968, inspired by the novel of the same name written by Albertine Sarrazin.

== Plot ==
Nineteen-year-old Anne escapes from prison to join a recently released friend. While jumping the prison wall, she injures her foot and fractures her talus bone. Julien, a mobster, takes her in, looks after her, and makes her discover passionate love. Anne falls very much in love but Julien neglects her. When the latter is arrested, Anne engages in prostitution and theft, putting money aside to live a happy day with him.

== Cast ==
- Marlène Jobert as Anne
- Horst Buchholz as Julien
- Magali Noël as Annie la Cravate
- Claude Génia as The Mother
- Georges Géret as Jean
- Jean-Pierre Moulin as Eddie
- Gisèle Hauchecorne as Nini
- Claude Marcault as Rolande
- Raoul Delfosse as Pierre
- Jürgen Draeger as Pedro
- Brigitte Grothum as Ginette
