= Jacky in Women's Kingdom =

Jacky in women's kingdom
- Theatrical release poster
- Directed by: Riad Sattouf
- Written by: Riad Sattouf
- Produced by: Anne-Dominique Toussaint; Frédérique Dumas-Zajdela; Florian Genetet-Morel; Romain Le Grand
- Starring: Vincent Lacoste; Charlotte Gainsbourg; Didier Bourdon; Noémie Lvovsky; Anémone
- Cinematography: Josée Deshaies
- Edited by: Virginie Bruant
- Music by: Riad Sattouf
- Production company: Les Films des Tournelles
- Distributed by: Pathé Distribution
- Release date: 29 January 2014 (France)
- Running time: 90 minutes
- Country: France
- Language: French
- Budget: $11.8 million
- Box office: $854.529

Jacky in Women's Kingdom (French: Jacky au royaume des filles) is a 2014 French comedy film directed by Riad Sattouf and starring Vincent Lacoste, Charlotte Gainsbourg and Didier Bourdon.

== Plot ==
Bubunne is a matriarchal totalitarian country led by the ruthless La Générale (Generaless). In Bubunne, the roles of men and women are reversed, up to the point where the male population is deprived of any civil rights, including work, education, military service, freedom of marriage etc. Men wear veils called "Voilerie" that are similar to burqas but without covering the entire face; they have a large tunic and with a ring around their chins (Unmarried men wear rings with a hole in them while married men wear filled rings). People worship The White Horses (making horses sacred animals) and the only source of nourishment is "Mush" (tasteless viscous liquid delivered from waterpipe-like sinks). The country is isolated from the rest of the world, borders are guarded by armed squads, and public executions are in order (the condemned being mostly men).

Jacky is an over-popular handsome young man, who lives in poverty with his widow mother, and crushes on La Colonelle (Coloness), the Generaless's daughter and the future leader of the state. Jacky is also one of the few boys with at least some education: his paternal uncle Julin (Michel Hazanavicius) - gigolo and contrabandist, also a masculism revolutionist - teaches the nephew literacy. Jacky's maternal aunt, with two husbands, is quite rich and her two sons constantly bully Jacky for being so poor.

Generaless proclaims a grand ball, at which the Lead Rider (the current leader's husband) will be chosen for her daughter as she succeeds to become ruler of Bubunne. Jacky's mother cannot afford a ticket to the ball, and Jacky desperately tries to make Julin give up the "treasure" left by Jacky's father. Jacky reports Julin to the police, yet unexpectedly authorities find Julin guilty of treason (printing illegal pamphlets) and incarcerate him for subsequent hanging. Sheriffess, grateful to Jacky for informing her, leaves him a free ticket to the ball.

After Jacky's mother dies (ironically, due to Jacky's own actions; sleepless because of the ball preparations, he cleaned her boots so well that she slipped), his aunt takes him in, but refuses to let him come to the ball. At this point, Jacky flees the village, only to be caught by Sherifess and immediately rescued by Julin (who escaped imprisonment by "riding wardens until they were knocked out"). Together, they manage to get to the palace. While Julin intends to sell his stash of vegetables and get money for crossing the border, Jacky wants to get to the ceremony and confess his love to Coloness.

During the ball, Coloness invites Jacky (disguised as a female officer) to her quarters and tells him that she does not want to be the new Generaless, and tries to seduce him (believing Jacky to be a woman). The Generaless, however, interrupts them, as she has already chosen the Lead Rider for her daughter. Jacky's cover is blown when his relatives recognize him, and he finally tells the Coloness he loves her, revealing himself to be a man. When Generaless orders Jacky to be caught and killed, he ventures deeper into the palace, discovering that "paste" is actually processed and enriched feces (as the Generaless's adjutant puts it, "the poor eat their own shit and are happy"). To reveal the truth, Jacky overloads the main cauldron, making the country realize what their food is made of.

Hiding under the Coloness's bed, Jacky convinces her of his love and spends a night with her, stating that he will love her regardless of who she is. In the morning, she shows him a crowd of men outside the palace: the entire country believes Jacky to be a hero (not without Julin's provocation). Jacky is then captured and sentenced to death, yet Generaless offers him a deal: life and marriage to her daughter in exchange for his cooperation in preventing rebellion. When he agrees, she tries to cut off his tongue (stating that Jacky "has seen too much"), but is immediately strangled to death by Coloness.

Together, the two open the borders of Bubunne, establish democracy and introduce emancipation, as well as restore the country's agriculture. In the last scene, when Coloness and Jacky are about to officially marry, they announce that Bubunne wants "no more secrets from its people" and strip naked in front of the crowd, revealing that Coloness is actually a man, and that they, in fact, just entered gay marriage (since Generaless had no daughters despite years of trying, she wanted her last child to become the state leader despite being male). The film ends with a woman holding a baby from the crowd yelling "Blasphemy!"

== Cast ==
- Vincent Lacoste as Jacky
- Charlotte Gainsbourg as The female colonel
- Didier Bourdon as Brunu
- Anémone as The female general
- Valérie Bonneton as The sheriff
- Michel Hazanavicius as Julin
- Noémie Lvovsky as Tata
- Riad Sattouf as Mit Kronk
- Valeria Golino as Bradi Vune
- India Hair as Corune
- William Lebghil as Vergio
- Laure Marsac as Jacky's mother
- Emmanuelle Devos as The female presenter
