= The French Kissers =

2009 film by Riad Sattouf

- Theatrical release poster
- French: Les beaux gosses
- Directed by: Riad Sattouf
- Written by: Riad Sattouf; Marc Syrigas
- Produced by: Anne-Dominique Toussaint
- Starring: Vincent Lacoste; Anthony Sonigo; Alice Trémolières; Noémie Lvovsky
- Cinematography: Dominique Colin
- Edited by: Virginie Bruant
- Music by: Flairs; Riad Sattouf
- Production companies: Les Films des Tournelles; Pathé; Studio 37
- Distributed by: Pathé
- Release dates: 17 May 2009 (Cannes); 10 June 2009 (France)
- Running time: 90 minutes
- Country: France
- Language: French
- Budget: $3,5 million
- Box office: $14.7 million

The French Kissers (French: Les beaux gosses, lit. 'The Handsome Kids') is a 2009 French teen sex comedy film co-written and directed by Riad Sattouf, in his feature directorial debut. The film follows Hervé (Vincent Lacoste), an average teenage boy who has little luck with finding a girlfriend until the beautiful Aurore (Alice Trémolières) takes a liking to him.

Sattouf, a graphic novel writer, was invited to write a script based on an idea from producer Anne-Dominique Toussaint, and he completed the screenplay with Marc Syrigas. Sattouf cast non-professional actors as the film's teenage characters, but he chose to use experienced actresses such as Noémie Lvovsky, Irène Jacob, Emmanuelle Devos and Valeria Golino as the adult characters. Filming took place over eight weeks in Gagny and Rennes.

The film was released in France on 10 June 2009, and a soundtrack composed by Flairs was released on 8 June 2009. The film was well received by critics, who particularly praised the humour, the acting and the cinematography.

It won the 2010 César Award for Best First Feature Film with Lacoste receiving a nomination for the César Award for Most Promising Actor. It also won the Prix Jacques Prévert du Scénario for Best Adaptation in 2010.

== Plot ==
In Rennes, 14-year-old Hervé and his best friend Camel are unpopular, socially awkward junior high school students with average looks and middling grades. Neither of them has ever had a girlfriend, and they regularly masturbate together to mail-order catalogs featuring lingerie models and pornographic websites. Hervé also occasionally spies on a woman undressing in a nearby apartment building from his room. He lives with his divorced mother, who often interferes in her son's life and engages him in uncomfortable conversations about sex.

Hervé unsuccessfully pursues romances with various girls at his school, including with Laura, who accepts his offer of a date as a joke. After Aurore, a beautiful and popular girl at school, approaches Hervé on a bus one day, she eventually invites him to a party at her place. Hervé's mother tags along with him to the party, where she meets the father of Anas, one of Hervé's classmates. The day after the party, Hervé asks Aurore out on a date. Although Aurore is initially hesitant, believing she is too young to date, she surprises Hervé with a kiss, and they embark on an awkward relationship.

Hervé shares his new experiences with Camel, often fabricating details. Hervé ends up ejaculating while kissing Aurore in her room, prompting her to throw him out. The next day, when Aurore's male friends beat Hervé up at school, telling him to keep his hands off Aurore, she rushes to his aid and kisses him in front of everyone, leading several students to spread a rumor that Aurore kisses boys for ten euros. One day, when Aurore invites Hervé over to her place to have sex, he loses his nerve and leaves abruptly, though he later lies to Camel that he did have sex with Aurore.

During a game of Dungeons & Dragons with Hervé and his friends, Aurore learns of the rumor that she charges ten euros to kiss boys, and discovers that Hervé lied to his friends about having sex with her. Enraged, Aurore berates Hervé and storms off. Hervé is heartbroken, presuming that Aurore has broken up with him, so he quickly finds a new girlfriend. At school, Aurore lashes out at Hervé when she spots him kissing his new girlfriend. Hervé later apologizes to Aurore and tells her that he loves her, but she responds that they should just be friends, leaving him devastated.

Now in high school, Hervé is dating Sabrina, Camel is dating Jenifer, Aurore is dating Wulfran, and Hervé's mother is in a steady relationship with Anas's father.

== Cast ==
- Vincent Lacoste as Hervé
- Anthony Sonigo as Camel
- Alice Trémolières as Aurore
- Julie Scheibling as Laura
- Camille Andreys as Meryl
- Robin Nizan-Duverger as Benjamin
- Baptiste Huet as Loïc
- Simon Barbery as Mohamed
- Irwan Bordji as Anas
- Loreleï Chenet as Mégane
- Sihem Namani as Sadia
- Salomé Durchon as Nolwenn
- Noémie Billy as Océane
- Emma Gregory as Emma
- Thania Perez as Jenifer
- Lise Bordenave as Sabrina
- Louis Bankowsky as Goulven
- Nicolas Bouissy as Koulmen
- Pablo Eskenazi as Pablo
- Victorien Rolland as Wulfran
- Yanis Aït-Ali as Mahmoude
- Maya De Rio Campo as Leslie
- Florence Dottel as Françoise
- Christophe Vandevelde as Hervé's father
- Yannig Samot as Anas's father
- Hassan Guerrar as Camel's father
- Nicolas Maury as the French teacher
- Noémie Lvovsky as Hervé's mother
- Emmanuelle Devos as the principal
- Irène Jacob as Aurore's mother
- Valeria Golino as the actress in the pornographic film
- Roch Amédet Banzouzi as the deputy principal

French astronaut Jean-Pierre Haigneré makes a cameo appearance as the Physics professor.

== Production ==
"In films, you see beautiful, handsome teenagers having intense love relationships at the age of 14. Or you have social movies with teenagers raped by their parents. [My friends and I] had an eventless life – nobody was interested in us – but we still had our frustrations. I wanted to show that."

— Riad Sattouf, writer/director

Graphic novel writer Riad Sattouf had studied animation and had dreams of filmmaking, but he thought that it would be too exhausting to write and re-write a script, find producers, find funding and censor his ideas to please others. Sattouf had rejected several film offers before because they lacked creative freedom, but he agreed when he was contacted by Anne-Dominique Toussaint, a film producer and a fan of Sattouf's graphic novels who wanted to make a teen film. Sattouf wrote the first draft of the script and then asked screenwriter Marc Syrigas to help him to re-write it. Rather than make a film about "the codes of today's teens, the way they talk, [or] their arsenal of electronic devices", Sattouf wanted to focus on "the intensity of their emotions". He wanted to depict "the things that happen during teenage-hood that we don't show so often".

Casting all of the characters in The French Kissers took place over three months. Sattouf cast the teenage characters through casting agent Stéphane Batut – whose team he described as "experts in casting teenagers" – and chose from taped auditions of 500 Parisian high school students. He did not want to work with professional actors who he feared would be egotistical and may have thought that he was not legitimate as a first-time director. He wanted to cast unknown actors due to his "phobia of stars", but after considering that he might not make another film, he asked Emmanuelle Devos, Irene Jacob and Valeria Golino to appear in the film and they all accepted. Sattouf sought actors who were "ugly ducklings with unusual features, and their own way of talking, of walking" and who could express emotions without "acting". He struggled to find teenage actors who were like their characters and were willing to be filmed in an unflattering way. He said that Vincent Lacoste and Anthony Sonigo were less concerned about their appearances when he showed them a picture of himself as a "very ugly" teenager. Three days before the beginning of principal photography, Lacoste broke his knee at a music concert, and so his resulting limp was added to the character. According to Sattouf, Lacoste and Sonigo were completely at ease with filming scenes of masturbation, and all of the actors treated their French kisses "like a hug".

Filming of The French Kissers lasted for eight weeks. Some street scenes and interiors of Hervé's flat were filmed in Rennes, Brittany – where the film is set – but the budget was too small for substantial filming in Brittany, so Sattouf tried to find a college in the Paris suburbs that resembled his own in Rennes. Most of the film's interior scenes were shot in Gagny in Paris's eastern suburbs at the Madame-de-Sévigné de Gagny and Eiffel de Gagny colleges. Sattouf used close-ups and unusual compositions when filming the teenagers to "feel their animal side". There was little camera movement to show "there is some heaviness in them; the world is turning around them, they are their own prisoners". He wanted the camera to be held "so close that you could feel their oily skin, every imperfection, and smell their [body odour]".

== Soundtrack ==
Les beaux gosses: Bande originale du film

Soundtrack album by various artists
- Released: 8 June 2009
- Length: 37:03
- Label: Naïve Records

The film's original music was written by French electropop musician Lionel Flairs, who performs under the moniker Flairs. It was his first composition for film. When he was approached by Sattouf to compose the soundtrack, Flairs was reluctant because he preferred total freedom when writing music, but after he agreed he enjoyed collaborating with Sattouf. The soundtrack is less like Flairs's usual "happy pop" because Sattouf wanted a sad feel to reflect the sadness in the characters' lives.

Track listing
No.	Title	Performer(s)	Length
1.	"Hervé et Leslie et le rateau"	Vincent Lacoste, Maya De Rio Campo	0:08
2.	"Levretto"	Flairs, Riad Sattouf	2:21
3.	"Hervé et le linge sale"	Vincent Lacoste, Noémie Lvovsky	0:11
4.	"Poursuite!"	Flairs, Riad Sattouf	0:48
5.	"On s'sert les coudes"	Moktar Nassif Et Les Cousins Hariri	1:59
6.	"Hervé, Camel et la Redoute"	Vincent Lacoste, Anthony Sonigo	0:06
7.	"Les mystères de la branlette"	Flairs, Riad Sattouf	0:40
8.	"Radio chaussette"	Flairs, Riad Sattouf	0:37
9.	"Maman la coquine"	Noémie Lvovsky	0:04
10.	"Ici ou là"	Moktar Nassif Et Les Cousins Hariri	1:27
11.	"Aurore Vole"	Vincent Lacoste, Alice Trémolières	0:32
12.	"Bus"	Flairs, Riad Sattouf	0:55
13.	"Anas et la bite humaine"	Irwan Bordji	0:12
14.	"Mettre les voiles"	Ginny Goldswinger	1:54
15.	"Hervé, Camel et les femmes matures"	Vincent Lacoste, Anthony Sonigo	0:26
16.	"La danse du ragga"	Ric	3:58
17.	"Hervé, Camel et les coulaisons"	Vincent Lacoste, Anthony Sonigo, Frédéric Neidhart	0:34
18.	"Run Camel!"	Flairs, Riad Sattouf	0:31
19.	"Pub rencontres bretonnes"	Flairs, Riad Sattouf	0:13
20.	"Parc"	Flairs, Riad Sattouf	0:59
21.	"Pub festival de rap breton"	Flairs, Riad Sattouf	0:26
22.	"Aurore et le secret des filles"	Vincent Lacoste, Alice Trémolières	0:47
23.	"Éjaculo"	Flairs, Riad Sattouf	1:07
24.	"Hervé, Mégane, le rateau"	Vincent Lacoste, Loreleï Chenet	0:14
25.	"Téléphone arabe"	Flairs, Riad Sattouf	1:14
26.	"Hervé le lover"	Vincent Lacoste, Anthony Sonigo	0:18
27.	"Baby"	Booba	4:32
28.	"Camel l'arabe de Satan"	Anthony Sonigo, Thania Perez	0:07
29.	"Bus 2"	Flairs, Riad Sattouf	0:26
30.	"Hervé aime"	Vincent Lacoste, Alice Trémolières	0:44
31.	"Scooter Blanc"	Flairs, Riad Sattouf	1:57
32.	"You Think You're a Man"	The Vaselines	5:36

== Reception ==
Critical reviews of The French Kissers were positive. The Gazette's Brendan Kelly, who gave the film 4 out of 5 stars, wrote that "Sattouf captures that strange mix of bravado and shyness that is teenage guy-dom, and the result is both frequently hilarious and, finally, quite touching." He thought that Lacoste was "perfect" as Hervé and that the casting of non-professional actors made the film more authentic. Justin Show of Filmink magazine described the film as a "fresh and brutally sincere comedy that strays away from typical teen flicks". In particular, he praised the cinematography, Sattouf's dialogue and Lvovsky's performance. Mike Goodridge wrote for Screen International that the film shows "a nice blend of humour and intelligence that places it somewhere between American Pie and Wild Reeds". He enjoyed the well-known actors' brief appearances and thought that the film's "acute observations and ribald humour" would appeal to adult viewers. The Hollywood Reporter's Duane Byrge summarised the film as "a hilarious spin through contemporary French adolescence". Berge found the teenagers' depiction "farcical but realistic" and felt that, like John Hughes's films, a particularly funny aspect was the mockery of authority figures. In a review for Variety magazine, Jordan Mintzer opined that the film comprised "plenty of heart-wrenching gags right in the smacker". Mintzer found some sequences "nauseating" but others "freshly and creatively slapstick", and praised the raw cinematography. David Stratton of At the Movies awarded the film 3.5 stars out of 5, describing it as "a likeable insight into the problems of children who want to grow up very quickly". He called the non-professional teenage cast "terrific", and praised Lvovsky's performance as Hervé's mother. Herald Sun critic Leigh Paatsch found the film "blatantly funny" but also "surprisingly moving". He called Sattouf "a knockout talent behind the camera" and praised the "great humour and honesty" of the story.
