= Guy Casaril =

- Born: 11 November 1933; Miramont-de-Guyenne, Lot-et-Garonne, France
- Died: 3 May 1996 (aged 62); Chapel Hill, Queensland, Australia
- Occupation: Film director

Guy Casaril (11 November 1933 – 3 May 1996) was a French film director, screenwriter and non-fiction writer. His first film, L'Astragale, was a cinematic adaptation of an eponymous novel by Albertine Sarrazin. His biopic about Edith Piaf was lauded by The Catholic Advance out of Wichita, Kansas for "evoking the mood's period and background".

== Filmography ==
Year	Title	Director	Screenwriter
1968	L'Astragale	Guy Casaril	Guy Casaril
1970	Les Novices	Guy Casaril	Guy Casaril
1972	Le Rempart des Béguines	Guy Casaril	Guy Casaril
1974	Piaf	Guy Casaril	Marc Behm
1975	Émilienne	Guy Casaril	Guy Casaril, Éric Losfeld, Philippe de Jonas

== Works ==
- Casaril, Guy (1961). Rabbi Siméon bar Yochaï et la cabbale. Paris: Éditions du Seuil. OCLC 145391.
- Casaril, Guy (1961). La magie quotidienne. Paris: Societe des Editions Modernes. OCLC 613473858.
