= Burnt Out =

- Directed by: Fabienne Godet
- Starring: Olivier Gourmet; Dominique Blanc
- Music by: Dario Marianelli
- Release date: 2 October 2005
- Running time: 90 minutes
- Country: France
- Language: French
- Budget: $2.3 million
- Box office: $271.000

Burnt Out (French: Sauf le respect que je vous dois) is a 2005 French drama film directed by Fabienne Godet.

== Synopsis ==
After pursuing the three occupants of a car, a driver stops in the parking lot of a hotel-restaurant, where he tries to collect himself. He is then approached by a young woman who asks him to kindly drive her to the train station. Some time earlier, in his forties, François Durrieux lives in Nantes with his wife, Clémence, and their only son, Benjamin. As a senior executive in a local printing company, he obediently adheres to the demanding work pace set by the director, Dominique Brunner. His friend Simon Lacaze, who refuses to sacrifice his private life, is the only employee daring to oppose some of the management's directives.

== Cast ==
- Olivier Gourmet - François Durrieux
- Dominique Blanc - Clémence Durrieux
- Julie Depardieu - Flora
- Marion Cotillard - Lisa
- Jeffrey Barbeau - Benjamin Durrieux
- Jean-Michel Portal - Simon Lacaze
- Jean-Marie Winling - Bruner
- Pascal Elso - Marc
- François Levantal - Jean
- Martine Chevallier - Julie
