= L'Astragale (2015 film) =

- Film poster
- Directed by: Brigitte Sy
- Screenplay by: Serge Le Péron; Brigitte Sy
- Based on: L'Astragale by Albertine Sarrazin
- Produced by: Paulo Branco
- Starring: Leïla Bekhti; Reda Kateb
- Cinematography: Frédéric Serve
- Edited by: Julie Dupré
- Music by: Béatrice Thiriet
- Production companies: Alfama Films; France 3 Cinéma
- Distributed by: Alfama Films
- Release date: 8 April 2015
- Running time: 96 minutes
- Country: France
- Language: French
- Budget: $1.8 million
- Box office: $149.000

L'Astragale is a 2015 French drama film directed by Brigitte Sy. It is the second film adaptation of the 1965 semi-autobiographical novel L'Astragale by Albertine Sarrazin, after Guy Casaril's L'Astragale (1968).

== Plot ==
Despite a privileged upbringing with adopted parents, Albertine develops a crush for Marie, a delinquent girl, and is arrested after an armed robbery together. Climbing out of jail with seven years still to serve, she collapses by a highway, having broken her astragal, a tiny bone in the foot. She is rescued by Julien, a professional criminal who happens to be passing, and he leaves her in Paris with Nini, a prostitute he knows. Though he pays for an operation to her damaged foot and gets her false identity papers, his way of life means indefinite absences. Unable to risk legitimate work, Albertine takes up prostitution and saves up for a hoped-for future with Julien. She is found by Marie, who rekindles their affair but is once again arrested. Then Julien is arrested and jailed: Albertine does not dare to visit, but learns that he is visited by Catherine, another woman in his life. Once he is released, she demands that he give up Catherine and he drives off to do so. When he gets back in the morning, he sees two policemen taking Albertine away.

== Cast ==
- Leïla Bekhti as Albertine Damien
- Reda Kateb as Julien
- Esther Garrel as Marie
- Jocelyne Desverchère as Nini
- India Hair as Suzy
- Jean-Charles Dumay as Roger
- Jean-Benoît Ugeux as Marcel
- Louis Garrel as Jacky
- Delphine Chuillot as Catherine
- Zimsky as Riton
- Billie Blain as Coco
- Brigitte Sy as Rita
- Suzanne Huin as Marilyne
- Yann Gael as Etienne
- Damien Bonnard as Young cop

== Accolades ==
Award / Film Festival	Category	Recipients and nominees	Result
Lumière Awards	Best Music	Béatrice Thiriet	Nominated
