= Brigitte Sy =

French actress and filmmaker (born 1956)

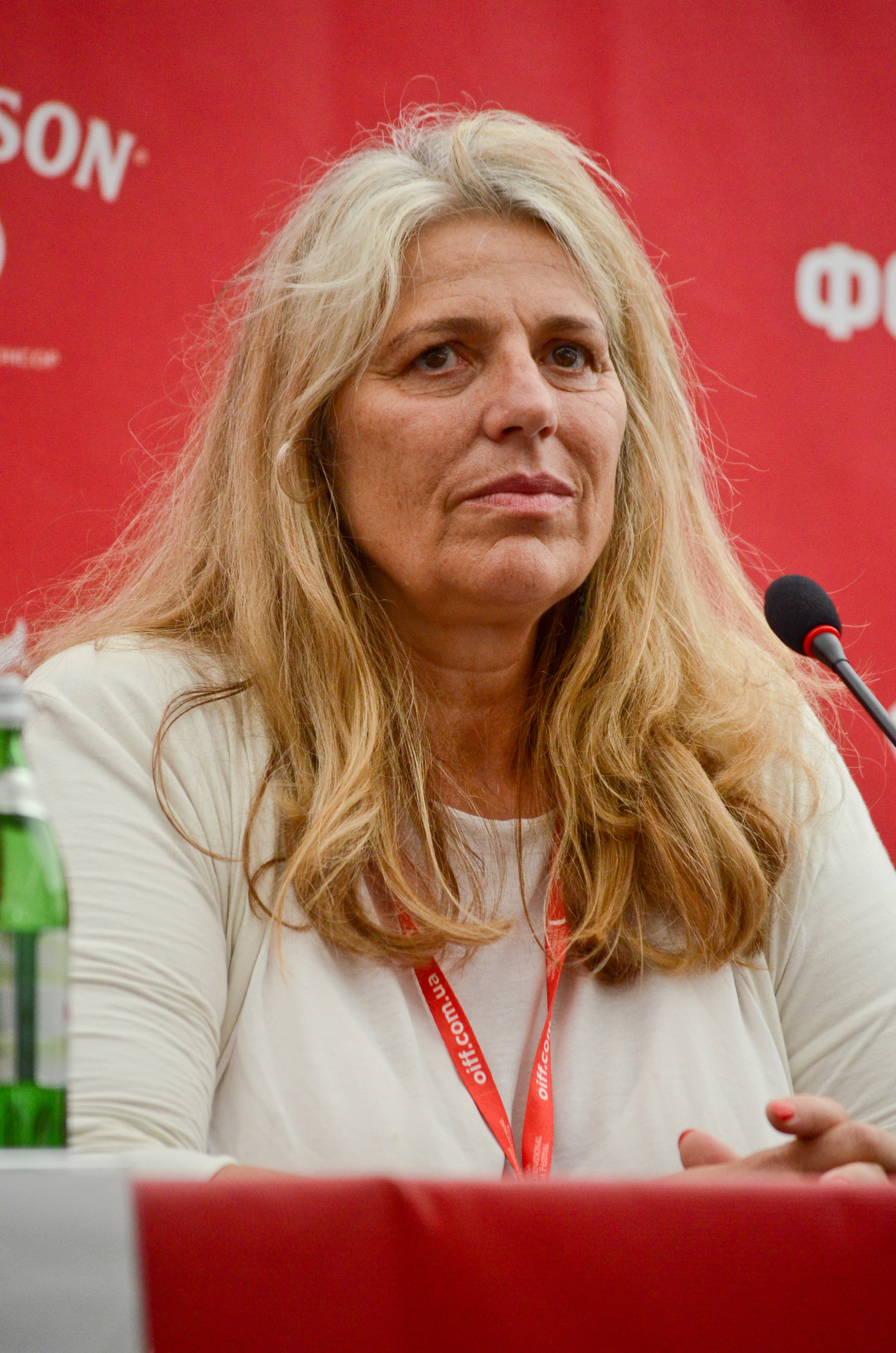
- Sy in 2015
- Born: 26 January 1956 (age 70); Paris, France
- Occupations: Film director, actress, screenwriter
- Years active: 1979–present
- Spouse: Philippe Garrel (divorced)
- Children: Louis Garrel; Esther Garrel

Brigitte Sy (born 26 January 1956) is a French actress and filmmaker. Her directorial film debut, Les Mains libres, was released in 2010 to critical acclaim in France.

== Life and career ==
She is the mother of the actors Louis Garrel and Esther Garrel whom she had with the director Philippe Garrel. In an Arte short film collection about AIDS awareness, she revealed that she has been HIV-positive since 1990, contracted from a partner who previously had a drug addiction. She also addresses the issue in Les mains libres and L'endroit idéal where the protagonist, Barbara (played by Ronit Elkabetz), is HIV-positive. Along with 99 other French women writers, performers and academics, she signed an open letter that argued the #MeToo movement had gone too far, turning into a "witch hunt", and denounced it as a form of puritanism, resulting in a backlash.

She is of Sephardic Jewish descent.

== Filmography ==
=== As actress ===
Year	Title	Role	Director	Notes
1979	Memoirs of a French Whore		Daniel Duval	
1983	Télévision de chambre	Young girl	Arthur Joffé	TV series (1 episode)
1984	Liberté, la nuit	Micheline	Philippe Garrel	
1989	Les baisers de secours	Jeanne	Philippe Garrel	
1991	J'entends plus la guitare	Aline	Philippe Garrel	
1991	Meeting Venus	French Customs Officer	István Szabó	
1991	Cas de divorce	Agnès Delsol	Gérard Espinasse	TV series (1 episode)
1993	Le signal	The woman	Mendy Younès	Short
1997	Genealogies of a Crime	Jeanne	Raúl Ruiz	
1997	Ma 6-T va crack-er	The director	Jean-François Richet	
1998	Cantique de la racaille	Véronique	Vincent Ravalec	
2000	Combats de femme	Marlène	Yves Thomas	TV series (1 episode)
2005	Regular Lovers	François's mother	Philippe Garrel	
2005	Des putes dans les arbres		Emmanuelle Huchet	Short
2006	Déluge	Her mother	Antoine Barraud	Short
2008	Fear(s) of the Dark	Eric's mother	Charles Burns	
2008	L'été indien	Alice	Alain Raoust	
2008	Versailles	Madame Herchel	Pierre Schoeller	
2008	Choisir d'aimer	Isabelle	Rachid Hami	Short
2008	Rien dans les poches	Agathe Manikowski	Marion Vernoux	TV movie
2008	Ben et Thomas	Madame Bouillon	Jon Carnoy	TV series (2 episodes)
2009	Nice	Fanny	Maud Alpi	Short
2010	Les Mains libres	The blond	Brigitte Sy	
2011	Declaration of War	Claudia Benaïm	Valérie Donzelli	
2011	Une vie meilleure	The indebtedness volunteer	Cédric Kahn	
2011	Dernière séance	The taxi driver	Laurent Achard	
2011	Vourdalak	France	Frédérique Moreau	Short
2011	Un mauvais père	Madame Legendre	Tigrane Avedikian	Short
2012	Chacun sa nuit	Claudine	Marina Diaby	Short
2013	Nuts	Madame Herschel	Yann Coridian	
2013	A Place on Earth	Loraine Morin	Fabienne Godet	
2013	Vandal	Christine	Hélier Cisterne	
2013	De l'usage du sex-toy en temps de crise	The doctor	Éric Pittard	
2013	Surveillance	Michele	Sébastien Grall	TV movie
2014	Wild Life	Geneviève	Cédric Kahn	
2015	L'Astragale	Rita	Brigitte Sy	
2015	La promenade du diable		Béatrice de Staël & Brigitte Sy	Short
2015	Lui au printemps, elle en hiver	Hélène	Catherine Klein	TV movie
2017	All That Divides Us	Ben's mother	Thierry Klifa	
2017–present	Black Spot	Sabine Hennequin	Julien Despaux & Thierry Poiraud	TV series (16 episodes)
2018	The Great Pretender	Thérèse's mom	Nathan Silver	
2019	Invisibles	Béatrice	Louis-Julien Petit	
2019	Online Billie	Brigitte	Lou Assous	
2023	Little Girl Blue	Monique Lange (voice)	Mona Achache	

=== As filmmaker ===
Year	Title	Credited as		Notes
Year	Title	Director	Screenwriter	Notes
2008	L'Endroit idéal	Yes	Yes	Featurette
2009	Fruits de mer	Yes	Yes	TV short documentary
2010	Les Mains libres	Yes	Yes	
2015	L'Astragale	Yes	Yes	
2015	La Promenade du diable	Yes	Yes	Featurette
2016	Les Ogres		Yes	
2022	Le Bonheur est pour demain	Yes	Yes	Released 2024

== Awards and nominations ==
List of awards and nominations
Year	Title of work	Award	Category	Result
2009	L'Endroit idéal	Clermont-Ferrand International Short Film Festival	Best Short Film	Nominated
2009	L'Endroit idéal	International Istanbul Film Festival	Best Short Film	Nominated
2009	L'Endroit idéal	Festival do Rio	Best Short Film	Nominated
2009	L'Endroit idéal	Créteil International Women's Film Festival	Best Short Film	Won
2009	L'Endroit idéal	Lutin Short Film Award	Best Fictional Film	Nominated
2016	L'Astragale	Filmfest München	Best International Film	Nominated
2016	L'Astragale	Odesa International Film Festival	International Competition	Nominated
2016	L'Astragale	Film by the Sea International Film Festival	Film and Literature Award	Nominated
2017	Les Ogres	Lumière Awards	Best Screenplay	Nominated
