= Noémie Lvovsky =

French film director, screenwriter, and actress (born 1964)

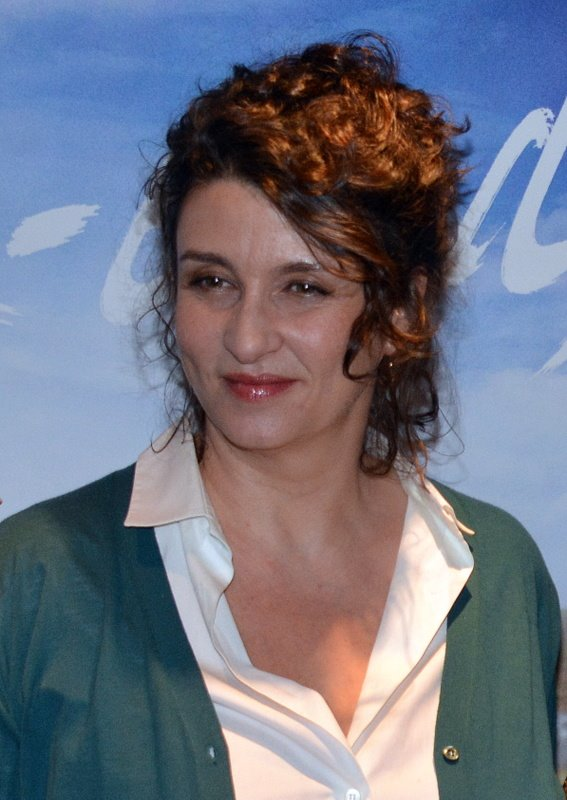
- Lvovsky in 2014
- Born: 14 December 1964 (age 61); Paris, France
- Occupations: Film director, screenwriter, actress
- Years active: 1986–present

Noémie Lvovsky (French: [lvɔfski]; born 14 December 1964) is a French film director, screenwriter, and actress.

She is best known for directing Camille Rewinds and Life Doesn't Scare Me, and for her roles in My Wife Is an Actress, House of Tolerance, Summertime, and Actrices.

She has received numerous awards including a Louis Delluc Prize for Best Film, Cannes Film Festival – Directors' Fortnight – SACD Prize, and French Cineaste of the Year at Cannes Film Festival among others. She has been nominated for 13 César Awards in Best Supporting Actress, Best Director, Best Actress, and Best Original Screenplay categories. She has been nominated for numerous other awards including the Lumière Awards for Best Actress and Best Director.

== Life and career ==
Born in Paris in 1964, Lvovsky is the daughter of Jewish parents who emigrated from Ukraine to flee pogroms. She studied cinema at La Fémis in Paris. Her first two films cast Emmanuelle Devos, who was then at the beginning of her career.

She is the actress with most nominations for the César Award for Best Supporting Actress, with seven nominations: in 2002 for My Wife Is an Actress, in 2006 for Backstage, in 2008 for Actrices, in 2010 for The French Kissers, in 2012 for House of Pleasures, in 2016 for Summertime and in 2021 for How to Be a Good Wife. Her film Sentiments was nominated for the César Award for Best Film in 2004.

Her film Camille redouble was selected to be screened in the Directors' Fortnight section at the 2012 Cannes Film Festival where it won the Prix SACD.

She was named as one of the jury members for the Cinéfondation and short film sections of the 2014 Cannes Film Festival.

== Filmography ==
=== As actress ===
==== Films ====
Year	Title	Role	Notes
2001	My Wife Is an Actress	Nathalie	
2002	If I Were a Rich Man	Claire	
2003	France Boutique	Monique	
2004	Kings and Queen	Elizabeth	
2004	Illustre inconnue	The sister	Short
2005	Backstage	Juliette	
2005	L'un reste, l'autre part	Nicole	
2006	L'école pour tous	Krikorian	
2006	Le grand appartement	Charlotte Falingard	
2007	Actrices	Nathalie	Also writer
2008	A Simple Heart	Nastasie	
2008	L'Endroit idéal	Rita	Short
2009	Coco	Brigitte	
2009	The French Kissers	Hervé's mother	
2010	Copacabana	Suzanne	
2010	Bus Palladium	The psy	
2010	Les Mains libres	Rita	
2010	Ensemble, nous allons vivre une très, très grande histoire d'amour...	Madame Adélaïde	
2011	Guilty	Edith Marécaux	
2011	17 Girls	The nurse	
2011	Le Skylab	Aunt Monique	
2011	House of Tolerance	Marie-France	
2012	Coming Home	Sabine Faroult	
2012	Camille Rewinds	Camille Vaillant	
2012	Granny's Funeral	The cryer	
2012	Farewell, My Queen	Jeanne-Louise-Henriette Campan	
2013	Chez nous c'est trois!	Jeanne Millet	
2014	Fool Circle	Rebecca	
2014	My Old Lady	Dr. Florence Horowitz	
2014	Tiens-toi droite	Sam	
2014	Weekends in Normandy	Sylvette	
2014	Jacky in Women's Kingdom	Tata	
2015	Summertime	Monique Benchiessa	
2015	Les jours venus	The producer	
2015	The Sweet Escape	Madame Pirchtate	
2016	Chocolat	Yvonne Delvaux	
2016	Willy 1er	Catherine	
2016	Rosalie Blum	Rosalie Blum	
2017	Based on a True Story	The inspector	
2017	Demain et tous les autres jours	Madame Zasinger	Also director
2018	One Nation, One King	Solange	
2019	Deux fils	Magalie	
2019	Invisibles	Hélène	
2019	The Summer House	Nathalie	Also writer
2020	Play	Max's mother	
2020	Working Girls	Dominique	
2020	À coeur battant	Chantal	
2020	How to Be a Good Wife	Marie-Thérèse	
2021	Teddy	Ghislaine	
2021	Le trésor du petit Nicolas	Madame Bouillaguet	
2022	Nobody's Hero	Isadora	
2023	Scarlet	Madame Adeline	
2023	La grande magie	Zaïra	Also director
2023	Jeanne du Barry	Countess Anne de Noailles	
2023	No Love Lost	The mayor	
2023	Youssef Salem a du succès	Lise	
2024	Madame de Sévigné	Madame de La Fayette	
2024	Nice Girls	Hernandez	
2024	Bis Repetita	Christine, la principale du lycée	
2024	Un Noël en Famille	Carole Lamarre	
2024	Les boules de Noël	Nicole	
2025	Love Letters	Marguerite Orgen	

==== Television ====
Year	Title	Role	Notes
2009	À deux c'est plus facile		TV movie
2010	Le meilleur ami de l'homme	Chantal	TV movie
2011	Bouquet final	The owner	TV movie
2015	Ainsi soient-ils	Jeanne Valadon	TV series (7 episodes)
2017	Loulou	The mother	TV series (1 episode)
2017	Paris etc	Madeleine Zand	TV series (5 episodes)
2018	Nox	Elisabeth Sereny	TV mini-series
2018	Les impatientes	Maude Girard	TV mini-series
2020	Si tu vois ma mère	Monique	TV movie
2020	La Flamme	Patricia	TV series (1 episode)
2023	Sambre	Arlette Caruso	TV series (1 episode)

=== As filmmaker ===
Year	Title	Credited as		Notes
Year	Title	Director	Screenwriter	Notes
1986	La Belle	Yes		Short film
1987	Une visite	Yes		Short film
1989	Dis-moi oui, dis-moi non	Yes	Yes	Short film
1990	Embrasse-moi	Yes	Yes	Short film
1992	The Sentinel		Yes	Also as casting director
1994	Oublie-moi	Yes	Yes	
1996	The Phantom Heart		Yes	
1996	Clubbed to Death (Lola)		Yes	
1997	Les Années Lycée: Petites	Yes	Yes	Telefilm
1999	Life Doesn't Scare Me	Yes	Yes	
2003	It's Easier for a Camel...		Yes	
2003	Feelings	Yes	Yes	
2007	Actrices		Yes	
2007	Let's Dance	Yes	Yes	
2012	Camille Rewinds	Yes	Yes	
2013	A Castle in Italy		Yes	
2015	Les Trois Sœurs		Yes	Telefilm
2016	Demain et tous les autres jours	Yes	Yes	
2018	The Summer House		Yes	
2022	Forever Young		Yes	
2023	La grande magie	Yes	Yes	

== Awards and nominations ==
Year	Award	Category	Title	Result	Notes
2023	César Awards	Best Original Screenplay	Forever Young	Nominated	
2020	César Awards	Best Supporting Actress	How to Be a Good Wife	Nominated	
2015	César Awards	Best Supporting Actress	Summertime	Nominated	
2012	Lumière Awards	Best Actress	Camille Rewinds	Nominated	
2012	Lumière Awards	Best Screenplay	Camille Rewinds	Nominated	
2012	Lumière Awards	Best Director	Camille Rewinds	Nominated	
2012	Lumière Awards	Best Film	Camille Rewinds	Nominated	
2012	Lumière Awards	Special Award	Camille Rewinds	Won	
2012	César Awards	Best Actress	Camille Rewinds	Nominated	
2012	César Awards	Best Film	Camille Rewinds	Nominated	
2012	César Awards	Best Director	Camille Rewinds	Nominated	
2012	César Awards	Best Original Screenplay	Camille Rewinds	Nominated	
2012	Locarno International Film Festival	Variety Piazza Grande Award	Camille Rewinds	Won	
2012	Cannes Film Festival	Directors' Fortnight – SACD Prize	Camille Rewinds	Won	
2011	César Awards	Best Supporting Actress	House of Tolerance	Nominated	
2009	César Awards	Best Supporting Actress	The French Kissers	Nominated	
2007	César Awards	Best Supporting Actress	Actrices	Nominated	
2005	César Awards	Best Supporting Actress	Backstage	Nominated	
2003	Venice International Film Festival	Golden Lion	Feelings	Nominated	
2003	César Awards	Best Film	Feelings	Nominated	
2003	Louis Delluc Prize	Best Film	Feelings	Won	
2001	César Awards	Best Supporting Actress	My Wife Is an Actress	Nominated	
1999	Prix Jean Vigo		Life Doesn't Scare Me	Won	
1999	Locarno International Film Festival	Youth Jury Award	Life Doesn't Scare Me	Won	
1999	Locarno International Film Festival	Prize of the Ecumenical Jury	Life Doesn't Scare Me	Won	
1999	Locarno International Film Festival	Silver Leopard (Young Cinema)	Life Doesn't Scare Me	Won	
1999	Cannes Film Festival	French Cineaste of the Year	Life Doesn't Scare Me	Won	
1999	Buenos Aires International Festival of Independent Cinema	Best Director	Life Doesn't Scare Me	Won	
1994	Thessaloniki International Film Festival	Best Screenplay	Oublie-moi	Won	
1989	Brest European Short Film Festival	Grand Prix	Dis-moi oui, dis-moi non	Won	
1989	Munich International Festival of Film Schools	Jury Award	Dis-moi oui, dis-moi non	Won	
