= La vie secrète des jeunes =

French cartoon

La Vie secrète des jeunes is a cartoon series by French cartoonist Riad Sattouf that appeared weekly in French satirical weekly Charlie Hebdo from 2004 to summer 2014. In the series, the artist portrays real life anecdotes.

A collection of 150 weekly drawings were published in October 2007 with L'Association Publishing House. It received the Globes de Cristal Award for Best Cartoon in 2008. A second volume was published in April 2010. The third, and final, volume appeared in 2012.
