= Riad Sattouf =

Syrian-French cartoonist, graphic novelist, and film director (born 1978)

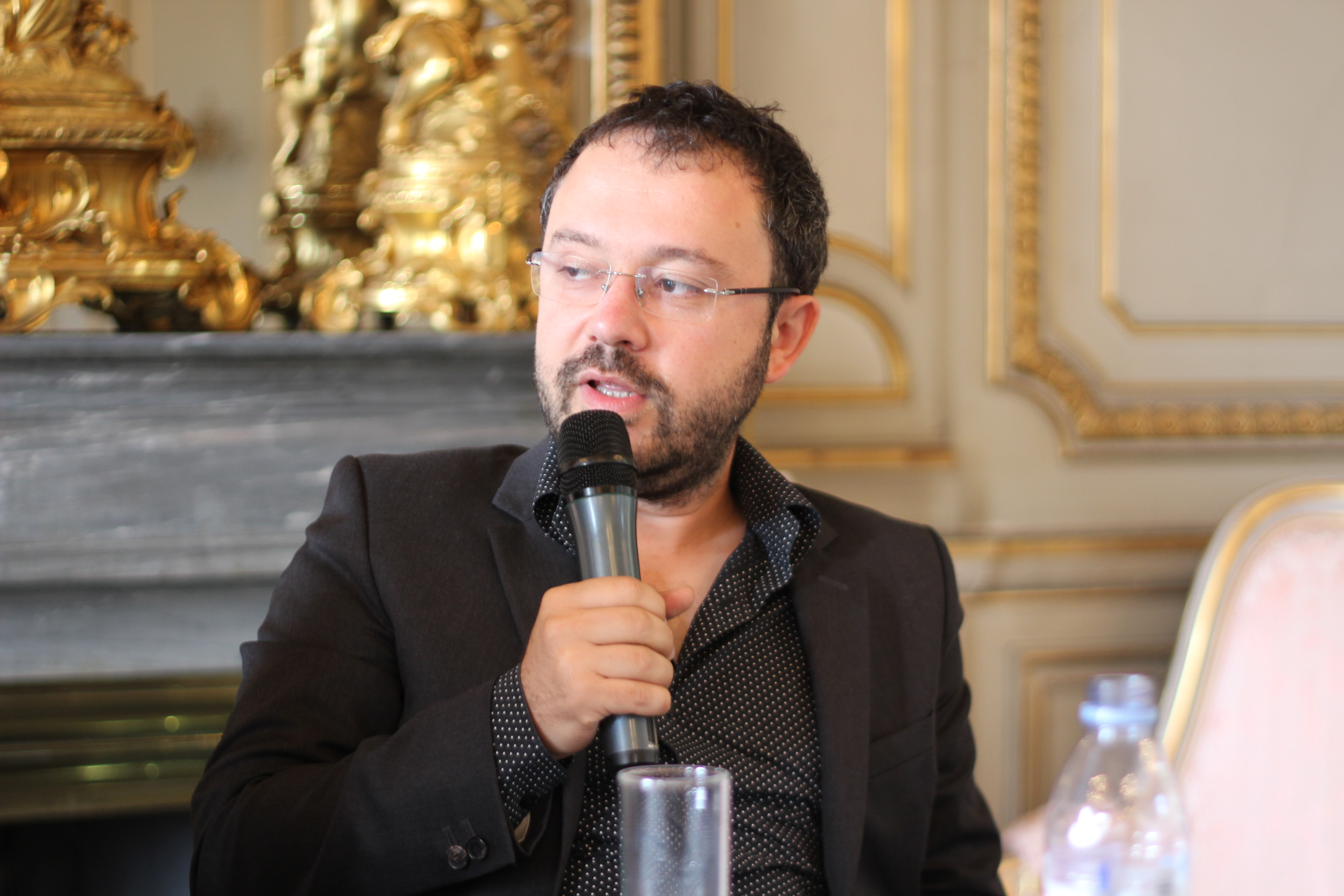
- Riad Sattouf in 2014
- Born: 5 May 1978 (age 48) Paris, France
- Area: Cartoonist
- Notable works: L'Arabe du futur (The Arab of the Future); La vie secrète des jeunes Les Beaux Gosses (The French Kissers)

Riad Sattouf (Arabic: رياض سطوف; born 5 May 1978) is a Syrian-French cartoonist, comic artist, and film director. Sattouf is best known for his graphic memoir L'Arabe du futur (The Arab of the Future) and for his film Les Beaux Gosses (The French Kissers). He also worked for the satirical French weekly Charlie Hebdo for ten years, from 2004 to mid-2014, publishing drawing boards of one of his major works La vie secrète des jeunes.

== Life and career ==
Riad Sattouf was born in Paris, to a Syrian father and Breton mother, and spent his childhood in Libya and Syria, then returned to France to spend his teenage years in Brittany, studying in Rennes. An avid reader of cartoon books and periodicals, sent to him by his grandmother, he was fascinated by them. Although he was studying to become a pilot, he applied to study at École Pivaut and then Gobelins L'Ecole de L'Image to study animation. The famous cartoonist Olivier Vatine noticed his talent and introduced him to Guy Delcourt, the owner of Delcourt, a publisher specializing in cartoons. Delcourt published Sattouf's first book Petit Verglas, written by Éric Corbeyran.

In a unique personal and humorous style, he narrated his own adolescent life observations in Manuel du puceau and Ma Circoncision published by Bréal Jeunesse, an imprint directed by Joann Sfar. The books were later reprinted by L'Association. In Ma circoncision, he denounced circumcision as a cruel and absurd act, superimposed on the context of the socio-political life in his ancestral Syria in the 1980s.

He then published the Jérémie series in the cartoon collection Poisson Pilote published by Dargaud, resulting in three books of the series. Jérémie is the story of a young sentimental and unstable youth growing to adulthood and is partly autobiographical. It also appeared in No sex in New York in 2004 on the initiative of the French left-wing daily Libération.

In 2005 he published Retour au collège, an observational study of adolescents in a Parisian middle school, which was a big success. Meanwhile, Sattouf developed the fictional character Pascal Brutal, an embodiment of pure virility. The comedic Pascal Brutal series imagines France of the near-future as an anarchic, neoliberal dystopia where the hero's outlandish machismo is given free rein.

From 2004 to 2014, he published a weekly strip in the satirical French weekly Charlie Hebdo entitled "La vie secrète des jeunes", recounting anecdotal observations of young people in public places. He likened the strip to a fly-on-the-wall nature documentary, and rendered the speech of his subjects with careful attention to sociolinguistic variation. The strips have been republished in three volumes, one in 2007, the second in 2010 and the last one in 2013. In late 2014, he left Charlie Hebdo and moved to Le Nouvel Obs, a weekly magazine, with a new strip called Les cahiers d'Esther (Esther's notebooks), based on true stories told to him by Esther A., a girl who was 9 years old when the strip started.

Sattouf also experimented with film dubbing by giving his voice to a cartoon character in Petit Vampire designed by his friend, cartoonist Joann Sfar.

Moving into filmmaking, he directed his first film entitled Les Beaux Gosses (also known by its English title The French Kissers). It was released on 10 June 2009 with great success in France and 1 million viewers in just 2 months. In it, Sattouf portrays the love life and coming of age of adolescence. The film was nominated for three César Awards in 2010: Best Debut Film, Best New Male Actor (for Vincent Lacoste in the role of Hervé) and Best Supporting Actress (for Noémie Lvovsky in her role as Hervé's mother). It won the Gold Prize for Best Film Debut, Best Male Revelation for Vincent Lacoste and Anthony Sonigo, Best French Revelation for Direction and Production for Sattouf himself and the Jacques Prévert Prize for Best Scenario and Best Adaptation with his co-writer Marc Syrigas.

In 2018, Riad Sattouf disclosed a "family secret" about his father, the main character of L'Arabe du futur, being fiercely antisemitic and working in Saudi Arabia, supporting the death penalty, pan-arabism, and the authoritarian Ba'ath movement of Hafez al-Assad. From November 24, 2018, to March 11, 2019, the Pompidou Center in Paris hosted a major retrospective of Sattouf's work, entitled L'écriture dessinée (or Illustrated Writing, in English). An accompanying exhibit catalogue of the same title was published by Allary Éditions.

== Prizes ==
=== Cartoons ===
- In 2003: Angoulême International Comics Festival René Goscinny award for Les pauvres aventures de Jérémy, volume 1, Les jolis pieds de Florence.
- In 2007, Jacques Lob Prize for Pascal Brutal, volume 2, Le mâle dominant.
- In 2008, Globes de Cristal Award for best cartoon for La vie secrète des jeunes.
- In 2010, Angoulême International Comics Festival's Prize for Best Album for Pascal Brutal, volume 3, Plus fort que les plus forts (Fluide Glacial).
- In 2014–2015, L'Arabe du futur, vol. 1: Une jeunesse au Moyen-Orient (1978–1984) has won the Grand prix RTL de la bande dessinée, Prix BD Stas/Ville de Saint-Étienne and Angoulême International Comics Festival's Prize for Best Album (Sattouf's second).

=== Films ===
- 2010: Académie des Césars (Académie des arts et techniques du cinéma) César Award for Best Debut for directing The French Kissers.

== Books ==
=== Publications ===
- 2003: Manuel du puceau (Bréal Jeunesse, Rosny-sous-Bois)
- 2004: Ma circoncision (Bréal Jeunesse, Rosny-sous-Bois)
- 2004: No Sex in New York (Dargaud collection, Poisson Pilote, Paris)
- 2005: Retour au collège (Hachette Littératures collection, La Fouine Illustrée, Paris)
- 2007: La vie secrète des jeunes, (L'Association collection, Ciboulette, Paris)

Series

- L'Arabe du futur: Une jeunesse au Moyen-Orient, (Allary éditions, Paris). In English translation as The Arab of the Future: A Childhood in the Middle East (Henry Holt, New York).
  - 2014: Vol. 1: 1978–1984
  - 2015: Vol. 2: 1984–1985
  - 2016: Vol. 3: 1985–1987
  - 2018: Vol. 4: 1987–1992
  - 2020: Vol. 5: 1992-1994
  - 2022: Vol. 6: 1994-2011
  - 2023: Full Edition 1978-2011
- Les Pauvres Aventures de Jérémie (Dargaud, Paris)
  - 2003: Les Jolis Pieds de Florence
  - 2004: Le pays de la soif
  - 2005: Le rêve de Jérémie
- Pipit Farlouse (Milan, Toulouse)
  - 2005: La couvée de l'angoisse
  - 2006: La route de L'Afrique
- Laura et Patrick (Lito collection Onomatopée, Champigny-sur-Marne)
  - 2006: Les jeunes de la jungle Story by Riad Sattouf, drawings by Mathieu Sapin
- Pascal Brutal (Fluide glacial, Paris)
  - 2006: La nouvelle virilité
  - 2007: Le mâle dominant
  - 2009: Plus fort que les plus forts
- Les cahiers d'Esther (Allary). In English translation as Esther's Notebooks (London: Pushkin Press).
  - 2016: Histoires de mes 10 ans
  - 2017: Histoires de mes 11 ans
  - 2017: Histoires de mes 12 ans
  - 2019: Histoires de mes 13 ans
  - 2020: Histoires de mes 14 ans
  - 2021: Histoires de mes 15 ans
  - 2022: Histoires de mes 16 ans
  - 2023: Histoires de mes 17ans
  - 2024: Histoires de mes 18 ans

Collaborations with Éric Corbeyran (story writer) / Riad Sattouf (drawing)

- Petit Verglas Delcourt collection Conquistador, Paris
  - 2000: L'Enfance volée
  - 2001: La Table de pierre
  - 2002: Le Pacte du naufrageur

== Filmography ==
Own films

- 2009: Les Beaux Gosses (The French Kissers) - Director, writer, musician and actor
- 2010: Mes colocs - director and writer of the web series
- 2014: Jacky in Women's Kingdom (Jacky au royaume des filles) - Director, writer, musician and actor

Collaborations

- 2003: Petit vampire - Scenario and voice-over for TV series of animated cartoons by Joann Sfar.
- 2010: Gainsbourg, vie héroïque directed by Joann Sfar - acting role as Fréhel's gigolo.
