= Fabienne Godet =

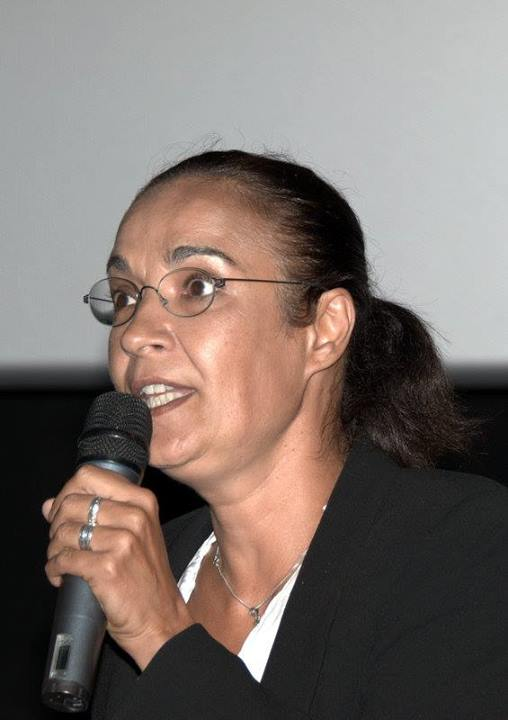
- Born: 20 May 1964 (age 62); France
- Occupations: Director, Screenwriter
- Years active: 1992–present
- Known for: Burnt Out
- Family: Antoine Godet

Fabienne Godet (born 20 May 1964) is a French film director and screenwriter.

== Biography ==
Fabienne Godet was born in Angers into a family of six children. She studied psychology and worked in the medical field. Simultaneously, she engaged in three years of theatre training at the Angers conservatory. According to Le Figaro, she following an unjust dismissal, she decided to fully immerse herself in her passion for cinema which she discovered, in part, through the Angers European First Film Festival. Drawing from her corporate experience, she crafted her debut feature film, Burnt Out, portraying the violence and mechanics of submission.

Her film Ne me libérez pas, je m'en charge received a nomination at the 35th César Awards in the Best Documentary category. In 2013, Godet presided over the short films jury at the Angers European First Film Festival. In 2024 she directed the film Guess Who's Calling! (Le répondeur) with Denis Podalydès.

== Filmography ==
Year	Title	Role	Notes
1992	La Vie comme ça (French: La Vie comme ça)	Director	Short film
1994	Un certain goût d'herbe fraîche (French: Un certain goût d'herbe fraîche)	Director	Short film
1996	The Sun Will Rise Tomorrow (French: Le soleil a promis de se lever demain)	Director, Screenwriter	Short film
1996	The Temptation of Innocence (French: La tentation de l'innocence)	Director, Screenwriter	Medium film
2006	The Sixth Man (French: Le sixième Homme : l'Affaire Loiseau)	Director	Feature film
2006	Burnt Out (French: Sauf le respect que je vous dois)	Director, Screenwriter	Feature film
2009	My Greatest Escape (French: Ne me libérez pas, je m'en charge)	Director	Feature film
2013	A Place on Earth (French: Une place sur la Terre)	Director	Feature film
2018	Our Wonderful Lives (French: Nos vies formidables)	Director	Feature film
2021	Lifelines (French: Si demain)	Director	Feature film
2025	Guess Who's Calling! (French: Le répondeur)	Director	Feature film

== Distinctions ==
- 2009: Ne me libérez pas, je m'en charge nominated at 35th César Awards in the category of Best film documentary.

== Participations ==
- 2013: President of the jury for the short film category at the Angers European First Film Festival
