= Moses und Aron (film) =

- Film poster
- Directed by: Jean-Marie Straub; Danièle Huillet
- Written by: Arnold Schoenberg (libretto)
- Produced by: Danièle Huillet; Jean-Marie Straub
- Starring: Günter Reich; Louis Devos
- Cinematography: Ugo Piccone; Saverio Diamante; Giovanni Canfarelli Modica; Renato Berta (Additional Photography)
- Edited by: Danièle Huillet; Jean-Marie Straub
- Music by: Arnold Schoenberg
- Release date: 1975 (U.S.)
- Running time: 107 min.
- Language: German

Moses und Aron, known in English as Moses and Aaron, is a 1975 film by the French filmmaking duo of Jean-Marie Straub and Danièle Huillet based on the unfinished opera of the same title by Arnold Schoenberg. During its 1975 run at US festivals, it was also known as Aaron and Moses, and was frequently reviewed as such.

It is one of three films based on Schoenberg works Straub and Huillet directed, the other two being Einleitung zu Arnold Schoenbergs Begleitmusik zu einer Lichtspielscene, a short film made directly before Moses und Aron, and, over two decades later, an adaptation of the one-act comic opera Von heute auf morgen. The film retains the unfinished nature of the original opera, with the third act consisting of a single shot with no music as Moses delivers a monologue based on Schoenberg's notes.

The film was shot on location in Italy and Egypt, specifically the amphitheater within the ruins of Alba Fucens. The film utilized the same team of cinematographers as Straub and Huillet's Chronicle of Anna Magdalena Bach. The soundtrack and cast of the film is the same as the 1974 recording conducted by Michael Gielen (Philips 6700 084).

The original German version of the film was dedicated to Holger Meins, a former cinematography student who joined the Red Army Faction in the early 1970s and died on hunger strike in prison. This dedication was censored by German broadcasters for the film's first transmission in 1975. The English subtitles of Schoenberg's dense German libretto were prepared by assistant Gregory Woods, who is credited on the DVD.

The film was shown at the 1975 Cannes Film Festival, but was not entered into the main competition.

In a review of the film, composer Allen Shawn commented on how the camera work and directorship mirrored the film's central premise:

While mirroring the technical rigor underlying the music, the Straubs also established a directorial method that brilliantly underscored the work’s themes: Moses and Aron’s dichotomous relationship is presented with an extraordinary visual economy—yet they are never framed in exactly the same way.

— Allen Shawn, Holy Ghosts Schoenberg’s Moses und Aron meets Straub and Huillet

== Notes ==
- Woods, Gregory. "A Work Journal of the Straub/Huillet Film Moses and Aaron by Gregory Woods." Enthusiasm 1 (1975):32-54. With "Notes" by Danièle Huillet.
