= Sicilia! =

- Directed by: Danièle Huillet; Jean-Marie Straub
- Written by: Elio Vittorini
- Starring: Gianni Buscarino
- Cinematography: William Lubtchansky
- Edited by: Danièle Huillet; Jean-Marie Straub
- Release date: 1999
- Running time: 66 minutes
- Countries: Italy; France; Germany
- Language: Italian

Sicilia! (Italian: [siˈtʃiːlja]) is a 1999 Italian black-and-white film directed by Danièle Huillet and Jean-Marie Straub. Sicilia! follows a man returning to visit his native Sicily, after living in New York City for many years. The film is an adaptation of Elio Vittorini's anti-fascist novel Conversations in Sicily, which was first published in 1941.

The film was screened in the Un Certain Regard section at the 1999 Cannes Film Festival. It was included in the 37th New York Film Festival.

== Cast ==
- Gianni Buscarino as the son
- Angela Nugara as the mother
- Vittorio Vigneri as the knife-grinder
- Carmelo Maddio as the orange-seller
- Ignazio Trombello as policeman
- Simone Nucatola as policeman
- Giovanni Interlandi as the traveler
- Mario Baschieri
- Giuseppe Bonta

== Production ==
Portuguese filmmaker Pedro Costa's documentary on Straub and Huillet, Où gît votre sourire enfoui? (alternately translated into English as Where Does Your Hidden Smile Lie? or Where Lies Your Hidden Smile?), was filmed while they were editing Sicilia!.

== Reception ==
In the British Film Institute's 2012 Sight & Sound critics poll, Sicilia! received 7 votes and appeared at number 235.
