= Günter Reich =

German operatic singer

- Günter Reich, in the 1960s
- Born: 22 November 1921; Liegnitz
- Died: 15 January 1989 (aged 67); Heidelberg
- Education: Deutsche Hochschule für Musik
- Occupation: Classical baritone
- Organizations: Staatsoper Stuttgart; Oper Frankfurt

Günter Reich (22 November 1921 – 15 January 1989), also spelled Günther Reich and Gunther Reich, was an Israeli baritone of German birth. He was a member of the Staatsoper Stuttgart for more than 20 years and is known for interpreting the works of Arnold Schoenberg in collaboration with Michael Gielen and Pierre Boulez.

== Career ==
Reich was born in Liegnitz (then part of Germany) and emigrated with his family to Mandatory Palestine in 1934. In 1958 he entered the Deutsche Hochschule für Musik in Berlin, where he was a student of Richard Sengeleitner. He made his professional opera debut at the Stadttheater Gelsenkirchen as Iago in Giuseppe Verdi's Otello.

From 1968 until his death in 1989 he was a member of the Staatsoper Stuttgart. He also worked extensively as a guest artist with opera companies internationally, making appearances with such organizations as the Bavarian State Opera, De Nederlandse Opera, the Deutsche Oper Berlin, the Edinburgh Festival, the Oper Frankfurt, the Hamburg State Opera, the Leipzig Opera, the Liceu, the Metropolitan Opera, the Opera Company of Philadelphia, the Royal Opera, London, the Salzburg Festival, the Stadttheater Aachen, the Teatro Municipal (Rio de Janeiro), the Teatro Nacional de São Carlos, the Teatro Real, and the Zurich Opera.

== Performances and recordings ==
In 1961 he sang in Vienna in the premiere of Schoenberg's Die Jakobsleiter, stepping in for Ivan Rebroff. In 1963 he participated in the premiere of Bernd Alois Zimmermann's Vokal-Sinfonie Die Soldaten. He recorded the part of Soroker in Boris Blacher's 200,000 Taler with conductor Heinrich Hollreiser, with Martha Mödl and Ernst Haefliger.

In 1970 he recorded Bach's cantata Ich hatte viel Bekümmernis, BWV 21, with Helmuth Rilling and the Gächinger Kantorei.

In 1973 he recorded the part of Moses in Schoenberg's Moses und Aron, conducted by Michael Gielen, and in 1975 with Pierre Boulez conducting the BBC Symphony Orchestra. The Gielen recording was the soundtrack for the film Moses und Aron of Jean-Marie Straub and Danièle Huillet.

In 1974 he performed Bruckner's Mass No. 3 and Te Deum with Kari Løvaas, Hildegard Rütgers and Kurt Huber in the Münster of the Zwiefalten Abbey. He recorded the part of the narrator in Schoenberg's Gurre-Lieder with Pierre Boulez.

In 1976 he was the narrator in a recording of Schoenberg's A Survivor from Warsaw, described as disturbingly dramatic, again with the BBC Symphony Orchestra and Boulez.

In 1979 he appeared as the duke in the production of Schreker's Die Gezeichneten at the Oper Frankfurt, conducted by Gielen, with William Cochran and June Card.

In 1980 he sang the title role in Ferruccio Busoni's Doktor Faust, staged by Hans Neuenfels, with Cochran as Mephistopheles and June Card as the Duchess of Parma.

Reich died in Heidelberg in 1989.
