= Renato Berta =

Swiss cinematographer and film director

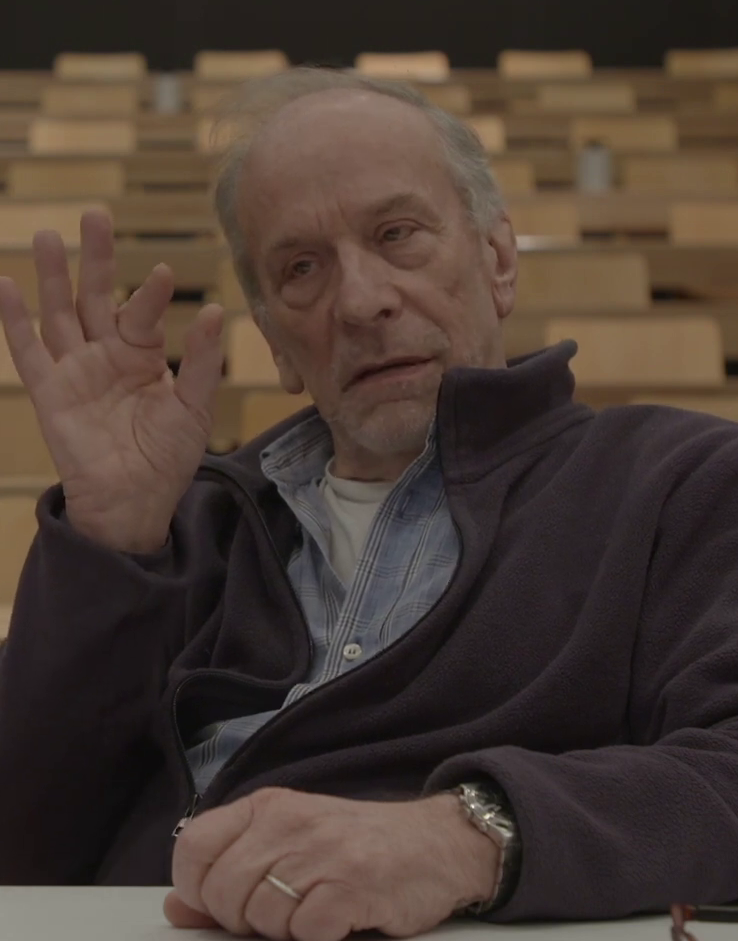
- Born: 2 March 1945 (age 80); Bellinzona, Switzerland
- Occupation(s): Cinematographer, Film director
- Years active: 1969–present

Renato Berta is a Swiss cinematographer and film director, best known for his collaborations with directors Alain Tanner and Jean-Marie Straub. Trained at the Centro Sperimentale di Cinematografia in Rome, Berta has worked as cinematographer in more than 100 films since 1969. He won a César Award for Best Cinematography for Au revoir les enfants in 1988 and a David di Donatello for Best Cinematography for We Believed in 2011.

In 2013, he was awarded the Chevalier of the Ordre des Arts et des Lettres.

== Filmography ==
Year	Title	Notes
1969	Charles, Dead or Alive	
1969	Long Live Death	
1970	Eyes Do Not Want to Close at All Times, or, Perhaps One Day Rome Will Allow Herself to Choose in Her Turn	
1970	Marie pleine de grâce	
1971	The Salamander	
1971	On the Point of Death	
1972	History Lessons	
1972	Tonight or Never	
1973	Einleitung zu Arnold Schoenbergs Begleitmusik zu einer Lichtspielscene	Documentary short
1973	Le Retour d'Afrique	
1973	Sexologos	
1973	The Awful Manners	
1973	Der Tod des Flohzirkusdirektors	
1974	La Paloma	
1974	The Middle of the World	
1974	Schattenreiter	Telefilm
1975	Moses and Aaron	Additional Photography
1975	The Wonderful Crook	
1976	Shadow of Angels	
1976	Der Gehülfe	
1976	Fortini/Cani	Documentary
1976	Jonah Who Will Be 25 in the Year 2000	
1976	The Big Night	
1976	Sartre by Himself	Documentary
1977	San Gottardo	
1977	The Indians Are Still Far Away	
1977	A. Constant	
1977	Repérages	
1978	His Master's Voice	
1978	Violanta	
1978	Alzire or the New Continent	
1979	Messidor	
1980	Every Man for Himself	
1980	Return to Marseilles	
1981	Max Frisch, Journal I-III	
1981	Seuls	
1981	Das Haus im Park	
1981	Notre Dame de la Croisette	Documentary
1982	Hécate	
1983	The Wounded Man	
1983	Imitation of Life	TV documentary
1984	Vive les femmes!	
1984	Full Moon in Paris	
1984	Tosca's Kiss	Documentary
1984	Le Voyage d'Antoine	Short film
1985	Rendez-vous	Nominated—César Award for Best Cinematography
1985	L'Atelier	TV documentary
1985	Hurlevent	
1985	L'Homme aux yeux d'argent	
1986	Taxi Boy	
1986	Corps et biens	
1987	Der Tod des Empedokles oder: Wenn dann der Erde Grün von neuem Euch erglänzt	
1987	Jenatsch	
1987	Au revoir les enfants	César Award for Best Cinematography
1987	Les Innocents	
1988	Ada in the Jungle	
1989	Chimère	
1989	Twister	
1990	May Fools	
1990	Uranus	
1991	Le Film du Cinéma Suisse	
1991	Viaggio in Italia	Telefilm
1991	Nothing But Lies	
1992	Off Season	
1993	L'Instinct de l'ange	
1993	Next Time the Fire	
1993	Smoking/No Smoking	Nominated—César Award for Best Cinematography
1994	The Death of Molière	Video
1995	Adultery: A User's Guide	
1995	Zihron Devarim	
1995	Das geschriebene Gesicht	Documentary
1996	Le Géographe Manuel	
1996	Party	
1996	Chimère	Telefilm
1997	Voyage to the Beginning of the World	
1997	Le Silence de Rak	
1997	Same Old Song	
1998	Anxiety	
1998	Yom Yom	
1999	Kadosh	
1999	Vanaprastham	Malayalam film(India)
1999	Beresina, or the Last Days of Switzerland	
2000	Vive nous!	
2000	Kippur	
2000	Merci pour le chocolat	
2000	Word and Utopia	
2000	Addio Lugano bella	
2001	Workers, Peasants	
2001	Eden	
2002	Marie-Jo and Her Two Lovers	
2002	The Uncertainty Principle	
2002	Lulu	
2003	Umiliati	Short film
2003	Il ritorno del figlio prodigo	Short film
2003	Three-Step Dance	
2003	Alila	
2003	Not on the Lips	
2004	Une visite au Louvre	Documentary
2004	My Father Is an Engineer	
2004	The Last Mitterrand	
2005	Roger Diamantis ou La vraie vie	Documentary
2005	Code 68	
2005	Magic Mirror	
2006	These Encounters of Theirs	
2007	Max & Co	
2008	Artemis' Knee	Short film
2009	Anonymes	
2009	Joachim Gatti, variation de lumière	Documentary short
2010	O somma luce	Short film
2010	We Believed	David di Donatello for Best Cinematography; Nominated—Globo d'oro for Best Cinematography
2010	Belleville-Tokyo	
2011	An Heir	Short film
2011	L'Inconsolable	Short film
2012	Lullaby to My Father	Documentary
2012	Gebo and the Shadow	
2012	A Child of Yours	
2012	Asfouri	
2013	Dialogue d'ombres	Short film
2014	Leopardi	Nominated—David di Donatello for Best Cinematography
2014	O Velho do Restelo	Short film
2014	Chafariz das Virtudes	Short film
2015	In the Shadow of Women	
2015	For This Is My Body	
2019	The Salt of Tears	
2023	The Plough	
2025	The Tasters	
