= Kroll Opera House =

Former opera house in Berlin, Germany

Coordinates: 52°31′07″N 13°22′14″E

- Krolloper
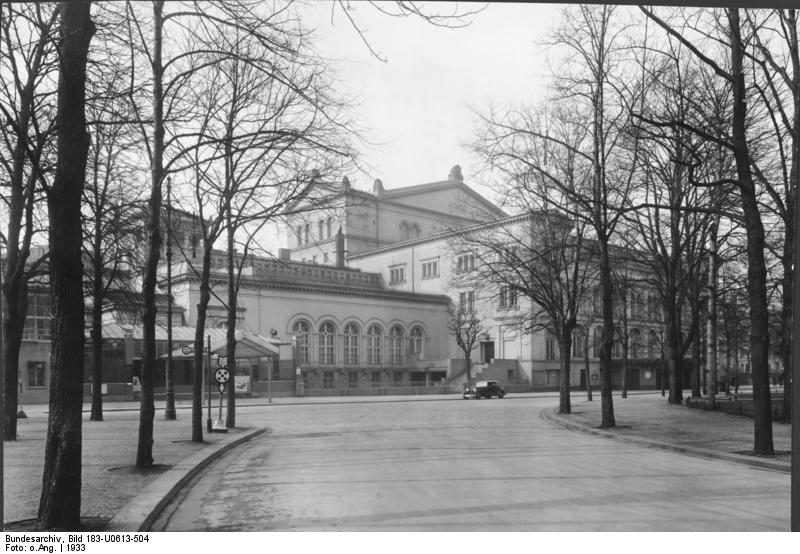
- The Kroll Opera House, 1933
- Interactive map of the Kroll Opera House area

General information
- Status: Demolished
- Location: Königsplatz, Berlin, Germany
- Construction started: April 1843
- Completed: 1844
- Opened: 15 February 1844
- Closed: 22 November 1943
- Demolished: 1951

Design and construction
- Architect: Friedrich Ludwig Persius

The Kroll Opera House (German: Krolloper, Kroll-Oper) in Berlin, Germany, was in the Tiergarten district on the western edge of the Königsplatz square (today Platz der Republik), facing the Reichstag building. It was built in 1844 as an entertainment venue for the restaurant owner Joseph Kroll, and redeveloped as an opera house in 1851. It also served as the assembly hall of the Reichstag from 1933 to 1942. Severely damaged by the bombing of Berlin in World War II and the Battle of Berlin, it was demolished in 1951.

== History ==
=== 1842–1848: Early years ===
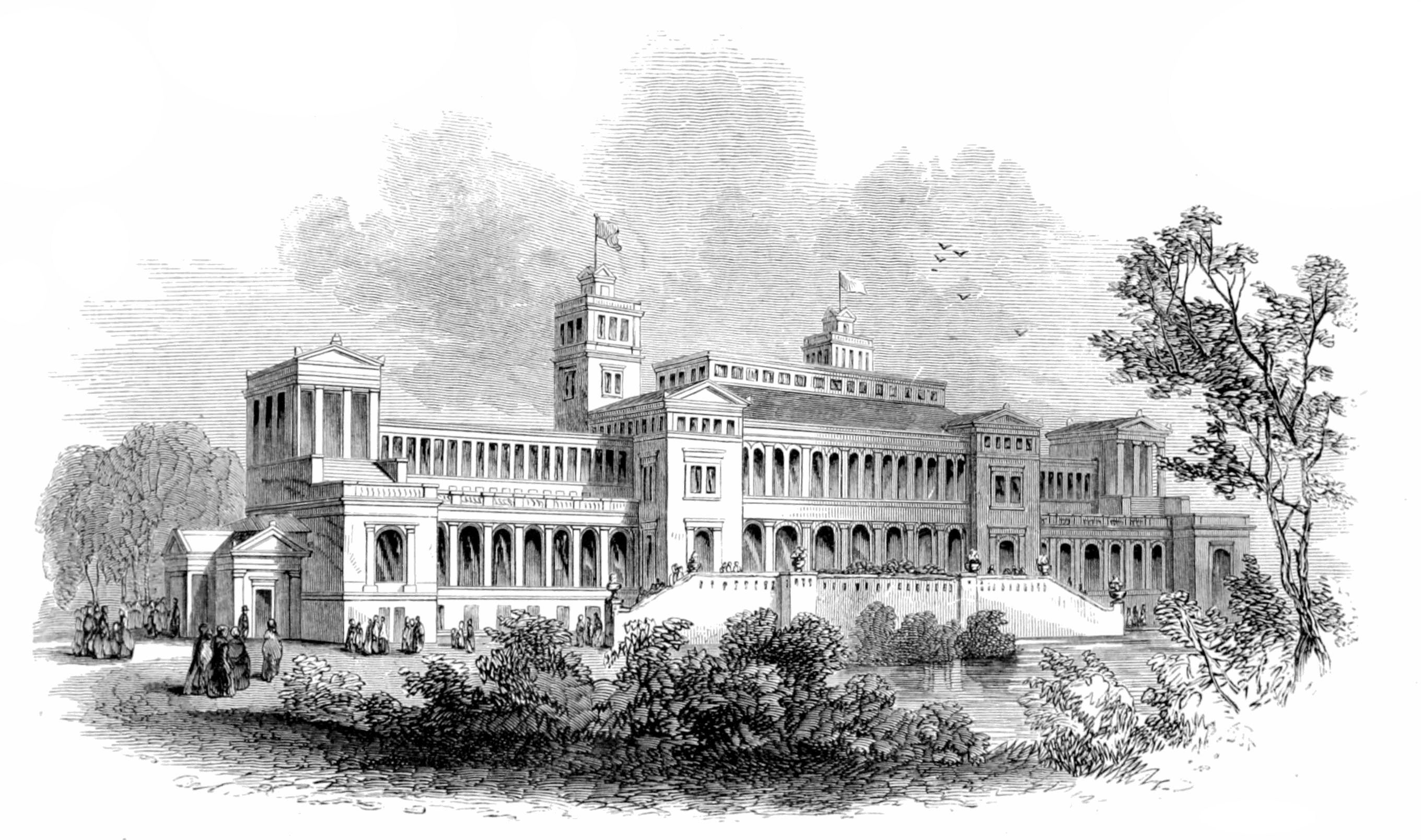
The Kroll Opera House, about 1850

The Kroll story began in the Silesian capital Breslau, where the entrepreneur Joseph Kroll (1797–1848) had opened the "Kroll Winter Garden" in 1837. The Breslau authorities chose this reputable establishment to entertain the new Prussian King Frederick William IV when he visited the city in 1841. The King was impressed by the splendid, flower-decorated rooms and suggested that something similar should be initiated in Berlin to become the social hub for the nobility in the Prussian residence.

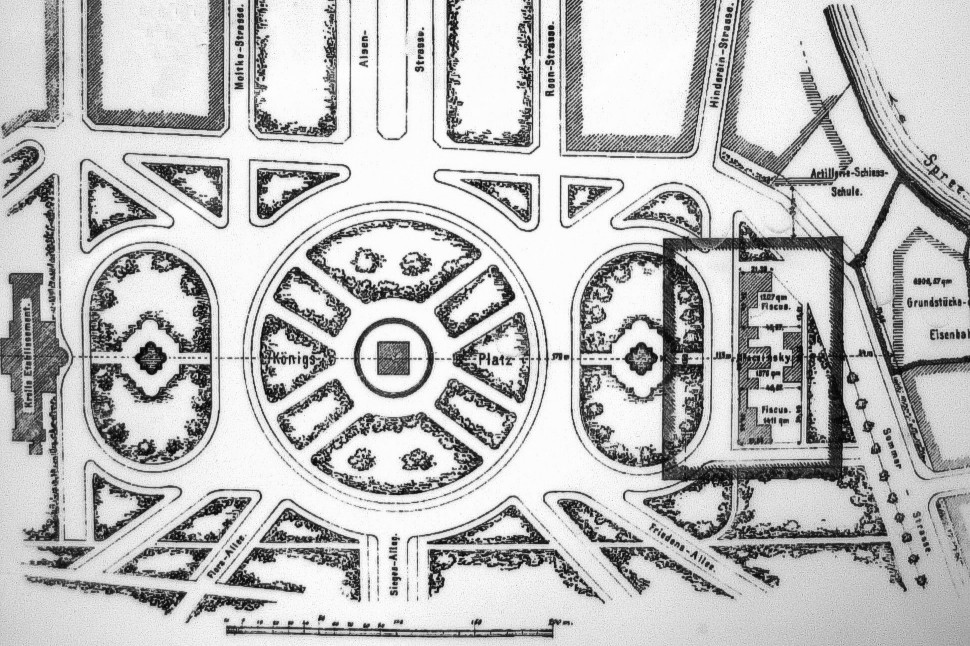
1879 map of the Königsplatz, Krolloper on the left, projected site of the new Reichstag on the right

After a consultation with his garden director, Peter Joseph Lenné and other members of the government, the king presented an order from the cabinet dated 19 August 1842, which specified the building site on the west side of the parade ground in the Großer Tiergarten park, and laid out the conditions: Kroll was able to use the property without charge, but he would have to return the land and demolish any structures he had built if the project failed. The parade ground, which had stood since 1730, was outside of the city just to the north west of the Brandenburg Gate. It had long degenerated into a sandy field, and the Berliners therefore derisively called it the "Sahara". Every step on the sandy ground would kick up a cloud of dust on the square. When it rained, the soil would turn into a mass of dirty mud. Yet Kroll took solace in the fact that the greenery of the Tiergarten park lay just beyond the property.

The plans for the new building came from the court architect Friedrich Ludwig Persius, which was a good indicator of the significance that the project had for Frederick William IV, co-working with Carl Ferdinand Langhans and Eduard Knoblauch. After a construction period of only ten months, Kroll's enterprise opened on 15 February 1844. Forty waiters were to serve up to five thousand guests in the three halls (the main hall, also referred to as the King's Hall, and two smaller halls), thirteen boxes for at least thirteen people each, and fourteen large rooms (for smaller parties). Sixty musicians provided entertainment. The "Tunnel" was a special attraction and praised as a novelty for Berlin – a hall where one could smoke! A technical innovation was the newly implemented gas lighting, which "consisted of 400 flames".

During the first year Kroll had satisfactory results. The main attractions were the large exhibitions, concerts and balls, which took place around lavishly constructed stage sets, attracting even the "Waltz King" Johann Strauss Jr. and his orchestra, who guested at Kroll's in 1845. Yet despite its uniqueness in Germany, as noted by the critics, the enterprise became increasingly difficult to sustain. On 15 April 1848, on his deathbed, Kroll regretted that his King had once had breakfast with him."^{1}

=== 1848–1894: Between success and bankruptcy ===
Joseph Kroll's successor was his eldest daughter, Auguste. The "National People's Garden" was opened as soon as May 1848 as part of an expansion. Great attractions were offered first in the garden and later in the great hall, such as performances with wild animals by their tamers and an extensive trade fair in 1849. In 1850 Auguste Kroll established a permanent summer theatre with open-air performances of operas and other events. Here, among others, Auguste's protégé Albert Lortzing directed his operas Undine, Der Waffenschmied (The Armourer) and Zar und Zimmermann.

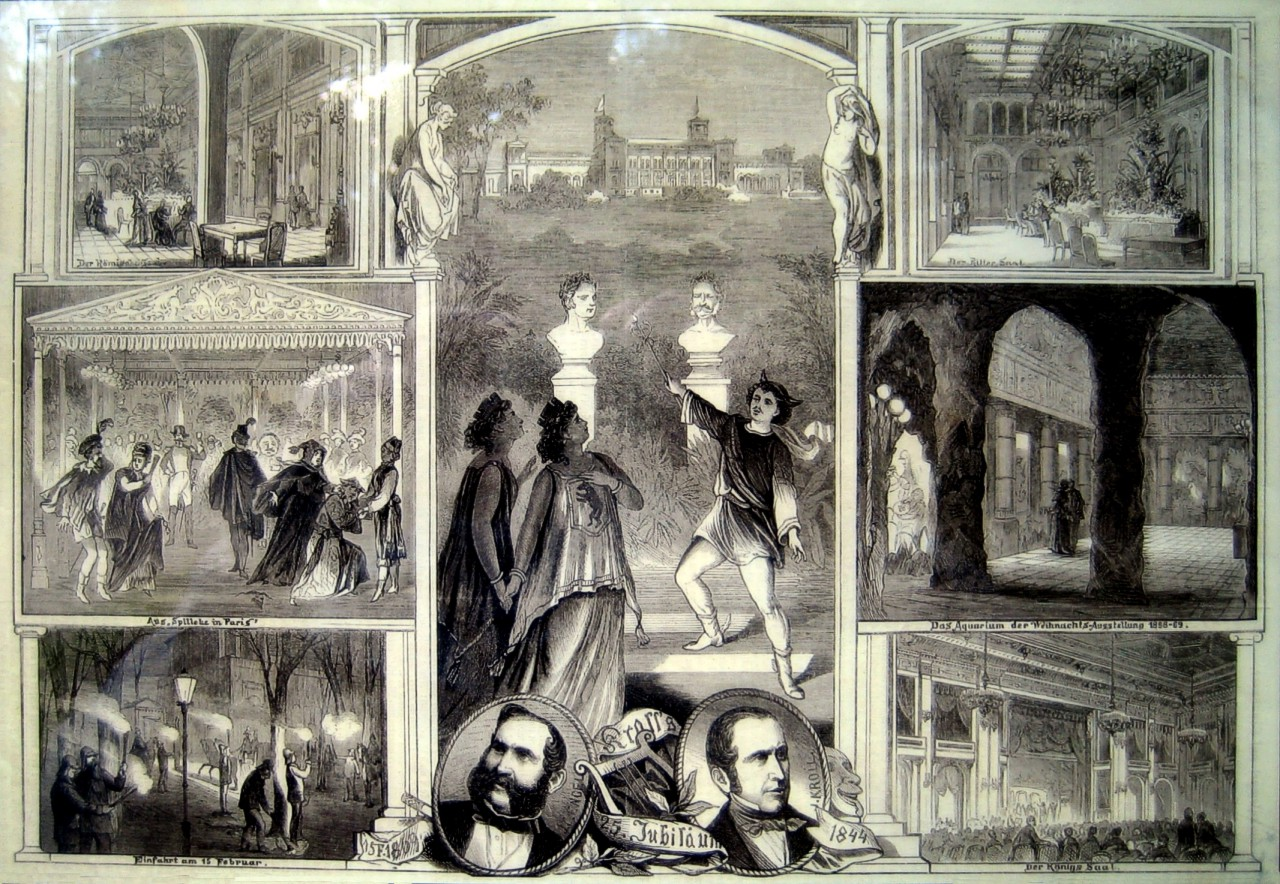
Poster in celebration of the 25 years jubilee, 1869

The operation of the new Theatre and Opera Company was suddenly disrupted on 1 February 1851, when the curtains were accidentally set on fire while lamps were being lit. But Auguste Kroll didn't let that stop her; she encashed the fire insurance sum and on 24 February 1852, the theatre already reopened in a completely new building. About a year later, Auguste married her capellmeister, the Hungarian violinist, conductor and businessman Jakob Engel. They successfully expanded the "Kroll Opera Pool" and brought many new comic operas to the stage, but also enacted lengthy music dramas by Richard Wagner. But the couple could not prevent the business from closing its doors on 1 April 1855. Despite all efforts, the earnings were far beneath the costs of operation.

One of the creditors, the entrepreneur Heinrich Bergmann, took over the insolvent operation and brought in well known musicians including Jacques Offenbach for one of his first guest appearances in Berlin. In 1862 however, "Kroll" was again forced into auction, which enabled Jakob Engel to buy it back. Although the company was still weighed down by debt, Engel was beaming with optimism, and attempted to bring the Berliners back into his establishment in droves with a diverse program – albeit only with moderate success. The situation worsened in 1869, when the implementation of economic freedom in Prussia led to a boom of newly established amusement parks all over Berlin.

Engel's attempts to sell failed because of the Prussian tax authority and the heavy mortgage that weighed down the business. In addition, the former parade ground had been refurbished and named Königsplatz ("King's Square") by 18 December 1864, the gardens were redone, and later plans were made for a series of monuments to honour the Prussian victories from 1864-71. After the Franco-Prussian War the Victory Column was solemnly unveiled in the middle of the square on 2 September 1873, while at the same time a long discussion took place at the German Reichstag diet about whether to tear down the Kroll establishment and build a new parliamentary building in its place. Only in 1876 did these proposals, which were so detrimental to any future investments, get tossed out, so that Jakob Engel was able to proceed with the modernization and improvement of his establishment. In 1885 – the first time in Berlin – the old gas lighting was therefore replaced by the "Edison system" of electric lighting. Two years later, Engel was also able to secure a contract extension for another forty years, but he ran out of time to implement his plans. He died unexpectedly from a stroke on 28 June 1888. His son tried to continue his work, but the "lack of interest from the Berlin public" for the Kroll stage's artistic presentation forced him to sell in 1894."

An 1893 account of attending an opera there written by American pianist Emily McKibbin: "Tuesday, June 27th, 1893...in the evening went to hear Marcelle Lembuch [or Lenebuch?] in Gounod's "Romeo & Juliet". She sang most beautifully & though her voice is not loud or powerful it is so sweet & she has so much execution. Besides, she is a perfect actress & in the poison and death scene she is quite wonderful. The whole opera was sung in Italian which was delightful, though the Germans cannot pronounce [it]. Kroll's theatre was dreadfully hot & we could not have stood it had it not been for the 15 min. pause between each of the acts in which we walked up & down outside in the charmingly illuminated gardens. It was a very pretty sight."

=== 1895–1931: State opera ===
Shortly afterwards the building was acquired by the Prussian Königliche Schauspiele royal theatre company and Kroll's establishment was rebuilt as the Neues Königliches Operntheater, a second state opera house (the other being the Staatsoper Unter den Linden). Works by young composers like Igor Stravinsky and Gustav Mahler were performed here, but also popular concerts given by Enrico Caruso and operettas like Die Fledermaus. As the decent opera house Unter den Linden did not match with Emperor Wilhelm's attitudes, plans for a new luxuriant opera hall at the site of the Krolloper were developed and demolition had already started in 1914, when the outbreak of World War I halted construction work.

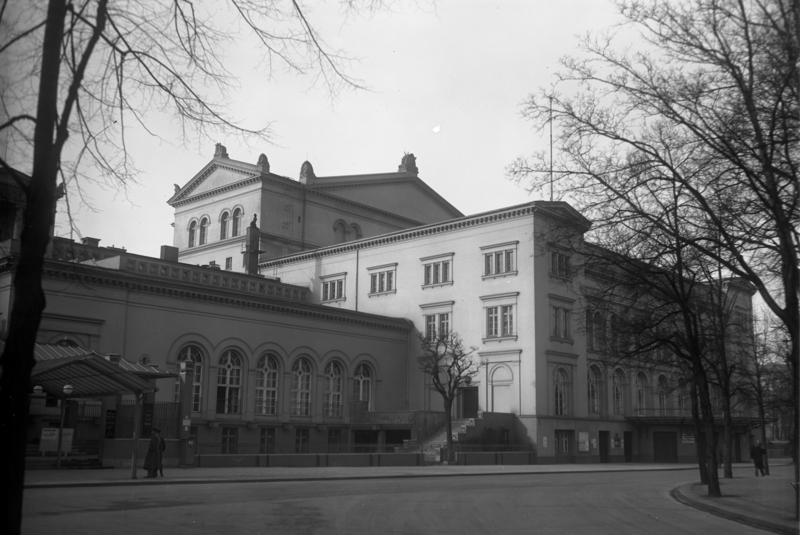
Opera house in 1930

After the war the authorities of the Free State of Prussia were unable to finance the reconstruction, which was finally carried out by the Volksbühne theatre company according to the plans of a Volksoper ("People's Opera") designed by Oskar Kaufmann. Nevertheless it appeared that the Volksbühne company also had overextended itself and the completion of the refurbishment had to be secured by public funds. On 1 January 1924 the building was re-opened again as the Oper am Königsplatz, the second home of the Berlin State Opera, with Erich Kleiber conducting Wagner's Die Meistersinger von Nürnberg. With the square, the house was renamed Staatsoper am Platz der Republik in 1926. To Berliners it remained known as the Krolloper.

In 1927 the Kroll Opera was again detached from the Staatsoper Unter den Linden as a separate opera company with Otto Klemperer as its resident conductor, re-opened on 19 November with Beethoven's Fidelio. During Klemperer's term the house saw world premières as Hindemith's Neues vom Tage in 1929 and Schönberg's Begleitungsmusik zu einer Lichtspielscene in 1930. He worked with renowned conductors like Alexander von Zemlinsky and directors like Gustaf Gründgens, as well as Caspar Neher, László Moholy-Nagy, Teo Otto, Oskar Schlemmer and Giorgio de Chirico as stage designers. The entire singing cast was placed in the hands of the singing pedagogue, Professor Frederick Husler. In an interview on German radio Husler talks about the special atmosphere which existed at the opera house during this period. He mentions some of the singers who were engaged at the time: "Jarmilla Novotna, who later went to New York to the Metropolitan Opera. Or Kaethe Haidersbach. She became very famous as Evchen in "Meistersinger" in Bayreuth. Or Maria Schult-Stormburg and Moie Vorbach, two very distinct personalities. They went to the other house Unter den Linden later. And a very impressive personality: Iso Golland, the Russian. He returned to Russia and has become a highly respected pedagogue." He describes the generosity which existed among the singers: "Their comradeship was extraordinary. No intrigues would arise. I remember that before rehearsals for a performance of "Die Verkaufte Braut" three "Brides" were sitting in my room. Novotna, Haidersbach and Zaezilie Reich. I remember them discussing, absolutely unselfishly, who of them should sing. Haidersbach said Novotna was the original Czech. Novotna said that Haidersbach had the more suitable lyric voice, whereas she herself was a coloratura soprano. And Reich then put forward an argument (and against herself) the benefit of the whole group. Where could you find such a thing?"

Klemperer's performances and their modern mise-en-scène were ahead of their time and raised the opposition by conservative circles. In the highly charged political atmosphere during the late days of the Weimar Republic, public pressure made the general administrator of the Prussian state theatres Heinz Tietjen realize that the administration could not afford the funding of three opera houses in Berlin. Despite Klemperer's protests, the Krolloper was finally closed on 3 July 1931 with the last performance of Mozart's The Marriage of Figaro.

=== 1933–1951: Seat of the Reichstag and destruction ===
The building stood empty for nearly two years, until the Reichstag fire on 27 February 1933 severely damaged the Reichstag building opposite it. After the German federal election on 5 March 1933, the Krolloper became the seat of the Reichstag. It was chosen both because of its convenient location and for its seating capacity. On 23 March 1933, the majority of the Reichstag delegates in the Kroll Opera House disempowered themselves passing the Enabling Act that gave Adolf Hitler virtually unlimited authority. At this time the elected MPs of the Communist Party and several Social Democrats were already in hiding or arrested. After the election on 12 November 1933 the National Socialists and their nonparty satellites occupied all seats.

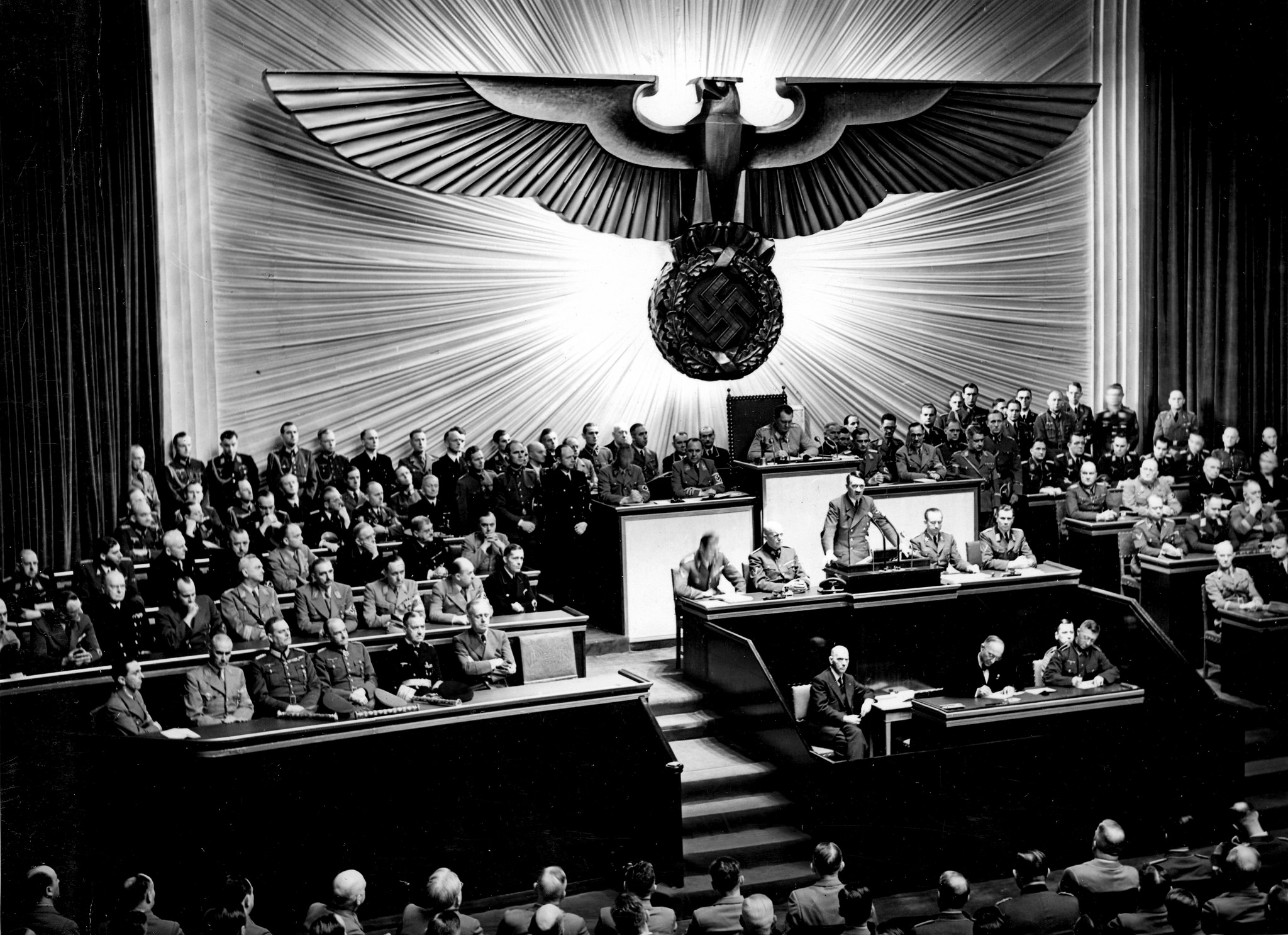
Hitler declares war on the United States in front of the Reichstag delegates on 11 December 1941

The main hall of the Krolloper was used for sittings of the Reichstag from 1933 to 1942. It was here on 30 January 1939, the sixth anniversary of the Machtergreifung (the appointment of Hitler as Reichskanzler), that Hitler warned "the annihilation of the Jewish race in Europe".

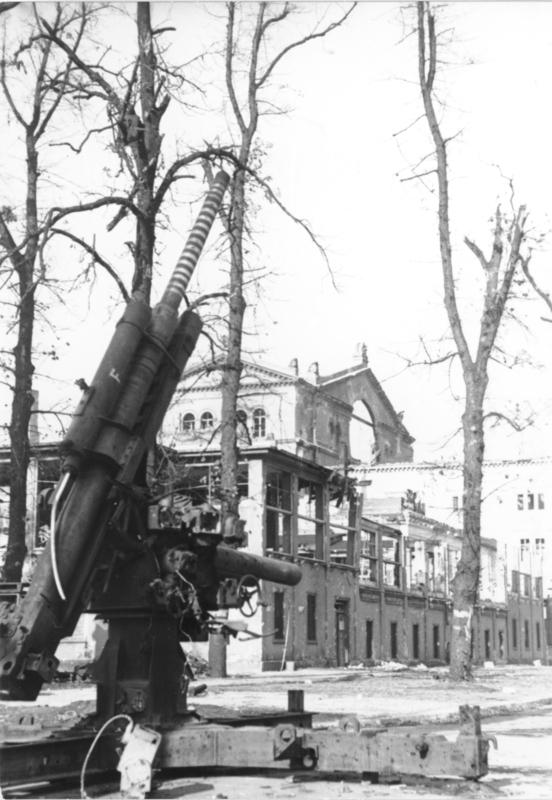
Ruins of the Kroll Opera with an 88 mm Flak gun in the foreground, May 1945

The grandiose plans of Welthauptstadt Germania, prepared by Albert Speer for Hitler, included the demolition of the Kroll Opera House and its replacement by a sumptuous "Führer's Palace", which would have stood on the western side of a "Großer Platz" with an area of around 350,000 m^{2} (3,800,000 sq ft). The outbreak of war and Germany's eventual defeat prevented any of this from being implemented.

The last session of the Reichstag was held in the Kroll Opera House on 26 April 1942, passing a decree proclaiming Hitler "Supreme Judge of the German People", allowing him to override the judiciary and administration in all matters. In 1942, the building once again was the site of several performances of the Berlin State Opera, after the Staatsoper Unter den Linden was destroyed in an air raid. The Krolloper itself was devastated by an RAF Bomber Command attack on 22 November 1943. It was further damaged in the last days of World War II in Europe when forces of the Red Army stormed the Reichstag ruin.

In mid-1945, a restaurant re-opened in the gardens of Kroll's establishment, keeping up business even after the remains of the building were demolished in 1951. The Kroll-Garten inn closed in 1956, and the last site was entirely cleared in 1957. Today the site serves as a large lawn south of the Bundeskanzleramt, and has been marked with a memorial plaque since 2007.
