= Conversations in Sicily =

Novel by Elio Vittorini

Conversation in Sicily
- 1942 Italian edition
- Author: Elio Vittorini
- Original title: Conversazione in Sicilia
- Translator: Alane Salierno Mason
- Language: English
- Genre: Fiction
- Publisher: Bompiani (1942)
- Publication date: 1941 (Italian); 1948 (English)
- Publication place: Italy
- Media type: Print (Hardback & Paperback)
- ISBN: 1-84195-450-0
- OCLC: 56645056

Conversazione in Sicilia (Italian pronunciation: [koɱversatˈtsjoːne in siˈtʃiːlja]) is a novel by the Italian author Elio Vittorini. It originally appeared in serial form in the literary magazine Letteratura in 1938–1939, and was first published in book form under the title Nome e Lagrime in 1941. The story concerns Silvestro Ferrauto and his return to Sicily after a long absence. Major themes of the work are detachment, poverty, exploitation and marital fidelity and respect.

Conversazione in Sicilia literally translates to English as Conversation in Sicily; English translations have appeared under that title and a variety of other titles, including In Sicily and Conversations in Sicily. The first US edition contains a foreword by Ernest Hemingway, reprinted in several later editions.

== Plot summary ==
Silvestro Ferrauto, a Sicilian typesetter living in Milan, is overcome by inexplicable feelings of despair. Prompted by a letter revealing his father's abandonment of his mother, Ferrauto decides impulsively to return to Sicily, a place he left at the age of 15. His journey unfolds almost without conscious choice, leading him into conversations with various Sicilians along the way. Through these encounters and his reunion with his homeland, Ferrauto gains a new perspective on his mother, finding solace from his despair. In a moment of intoxication, he appears to converse with his deceased brother or a vision of him at the age he was in life. The novel concludes with a poignant scene where Ferrauto's father weeps in the kitchen, while his mother tenderly tends to him by washing his feet.

== Characters ==
- Silvestro Ferrauto - the protagonist
- The Father - appears in the end while the mother is washing his feet
- The Wife - never appears in person
- Sicilian orange pickers - first conversation is with a Sicilian labourer
- "With Mustache" - a Sicilian policeman on the train, a state functionary
- "Without Mustache" - a Sicilian policeman on the train, a state functionary
- The Big Lombard - a Sicilian on the train
- Concezione Ferrauto - the mother
- Grandpa - the father of the mother, deceased
- Calogero - the Knife Grinder
- Ezechiele - the saddlemaker
- Porfirio - the draper
- Colombo - the vintner
- Liborio - the brother, deceased

== Literary significance and criticism ==
The novel is usually interpreted by critics as either a criticism of Fascist Italy, disguised by the use of allegoric figures and by the adoption of a non-realistic style, or as the chronicle of a dream-like voyage. Themes revolving around social injustice, which will be central in Vittorini's future work, are already present:

In 1936 Vittorini began writing his most important novel, Conversazione in Sicilia..., the clearest expression of his anti-fascist feelings. The action of the book is less important than the emotional agony of its hero, brought on by his constant consciousness of fascism, war, and the plight of his brothers. Recognizing the novel’s power, the fascist government censored its serialization in Letteratura in 1936–38 and even withdrew an entire issue of that periodical from circulation. In 1942, after publication of the book, Vittorini was called in for questioning and finally was imprisoned in 1943.

— Encyclopædia Britannica

The protagonist and author share many of the same experiences - growing up in a railway family, travelling widely by rail around Sicily and Italy, working in northern Italy as a typesetter, and illness.

== Adaptation ==
The novel serves as the basis for Jean-Marie Straub and Danièle Huillet's film Sicilia!.

== Footnotes ==
- Conversations in Sicily, Elio Vittorini, translated by Alane Salierno Mason
