= Too Early/Too Late =

- Directed by: Jean-Marie Straub; Danièle Huillet
- Produced by: Jean-Marie Straub; Danièle Huillet
- Narrated by: Danièle Huillet; Bahgat Elnadi; Gérard Samaan
- Cinematography: Caroline Champetier; William Lubtchansky; Robert Alazraki; Marguerite Perlado
- Edited by: Jean-Marie Straub; Danièle Huillet
- Release date: 1981
- Running time: 105 minutes
- Countries: France; Egypt
- Languages: German; French; Arabic

Too Early/Too Late (French: Trop tôt/Trop tard) is a 1981 essay film directed by Jean-Marie Straub and Danièle Huillet. It is a sequence of shots of rural landscapes accompanied by readings of texts about the struggles of poor farmers, followed by another sequence of shots in Egypt.
