= Dialogue of Shadows =

- French: Dialogue d'ombres
- Directed by: Jean-Marie Straub
- Written by: Jean-Marie Straub
- Based on: "Dialogue d'ombres" by Georges Bernanos
- Produced by: Arnaud Dommerc; Barbara Ulrich
- Cinematography: Renato Berta; Christophe Clavert
- Edited by: Christophe Clavert
- Release dates: 25 October 2013 (Viennale); 11 March 2015
- Running time: 28 minutes
- Countries: Switzerland; France
- Language: French

Dialogue of Shadows (French: Dialogue d'ombres) is a 2013 French-Swiss short drama film directed by Jean-Marie Straub, starring Cornelia Geiser and Bertrand Brouder. It follows a man and a woman who converse about love and the weight of history. The film is based on a short story by Georges Bernanos.

== Cast ==
- Cornelia Geiser as Françoise
- Bertrand Brouder as Jacques

== Production ==
Jean-Marie Straub and his partner Danièle Huillet originally planned to adapt Georges Bernanos' 1928 short story "Dialogue d'ombres" in 1954. They made some preparations but soon abandoned the project. Straub revived the project in the summer of 2012, several years after Huilet's death. According to Straub he wanted to make the film because he found the right location on the countryside of Normandy.

The film was produced through Switzerland's Belva Film and France's Andolfi. The actors rehearsed for six months. Filming began on 15 June 2013 and lasted ten days. The crew consisted of eight people.

== Release ==
The film premiered at the 2013 Vienna International Film Festival. It was released in French cinemas on 11 March 2015, together with Straub's film A propos de Venise.
