= These Encounters of Theirs =

2006 film

- Directed by: Straub–Huillet
- Written by: Jean-Marie Straub
- Cinematography: Renato Berta; Marion Befve; Jean-Paul Toraille
- Edited by: Danièle Huillet; Jean-Marie Straub
- Release date: 2006
- Running time: 68 minutes
- Countries: Italy; France
- Language: Italian

These Encounters of Theirs (Italian: Quei loro incontri, French: Ces rencontres avec eux) is a 2006 Italian-French drama film directed by Jean-Marie Straub and Danièle Huillet and based on Cesare Pavese's Dialogues with Leucò.

The film entered the main competition at the 63rd edition of the Venice Film Festival, in which it was awarded a special Lion for "innovation in the language of cinema".

== Cast ==
- Angela Nugara
- Vittorio Vigneri
- Grazia Orsi
- Romano Guelfi
- Angela Durantini
- Enrico Achilli
- Giovanna Daddi
- Dario Marconcini
