= Black Sin =

1989 film

- Directed by: Danièle Huillet; Jean-Marie Straub
- Written by: Friedrich Hölderlin; Danièle Huillet; Jean-Marie Straub
- Starring: Andreas von Rauch
- Cinematography: William Lubtchansky
- Edited by: Danièle Huillet; Jean-Marie Straub
- Release date: 1989
- Running time: 40 minutes
- Countries: West Germany; France
- Language: German

Black Sin (German: Schwarze Sünde, French: Noir péché) is a 1989 German-French short drama film directed by Danièle Huillet and Jean-Marie Straub. It was screened in the Un Certain Regard section at the 1989 Cannes Film Festival.

The text presented in the film is the third Empedocles fragment by Friedrich Hölderlin. The two statues shown at the beginning are Mother Earth and The Avenger by Ernst Barlach. The music is the fourth movement of Ludwig van Beethoven's String Quartet No. 16 in F major Op. 135, the last work he was able to complete before his death. The fourth movement is entitled The difficult decision. The string quartet was recorded in London in 1935 by the Busch Quartet, who fled Nazi Germany to England in 1934.

== Cast ==
- Andreas von Rauch as Empédocle
- Vladimir Baratta as Pausanias
- Howard Vernon as Manes
- Danièle Huillet
