= En rachâchant =

1982 film

- Directed by: Danièle Huillet; Jean-Marie Straub
- Based on: "Ah! Ernesto" by Marguerite Duras
- Produced by: Danièle Huillet; Jean-Marie Straub
- Starring: Olivier Straub
- Cinematography: Henri Alekan; Louis Cochet
- Release date: 1982
- Running time: 7 minutes
- Country: France
- Language: French

En rachâchant is a 1982 short French film directed by Danièle Huillet and Jean-Marie Straub.

== Cast ==
- Olivier Straub as Ernesto
- Nadette Thinus as The Mom
- Bernard Thinus as The Dad
- Raymond Gérard as The Teacher
