= History Lessons =

1972 film

- Directed by: Danièle Huillet; Jean-Marie Straub
- Written by: Bertolt Brecht; Danièle Huillet; Jean-Marie Straub
- Produced by: Danièle Huillet; Jean-Marie Straub
- Starring: Gottfried Bold
- Cinematography: Renato Berta
- Edited by: Danièle Huillet; Jean-Marie Straub
- Release date: 10 September 1972
- Running time: 88 minutes
- Country: West Germany
- Language: German

History Lessons (German: Geschichtsunterricht) is a 1972 West German drama film directed by Danièle Huillet and Jean-Marie Straub.

== Cast ==
- Gottfried Bold as the Banker
- Johann Unterpertinger as the Peasant
- Henri Ludwigg as the Lawyer
- Carl Vaillant as the Writer
- Benedikt Zulauf as the Young Man
