= Il Menabò di letteratura =

Cultural and literary magazine in Torino, Italy (1959–1967)

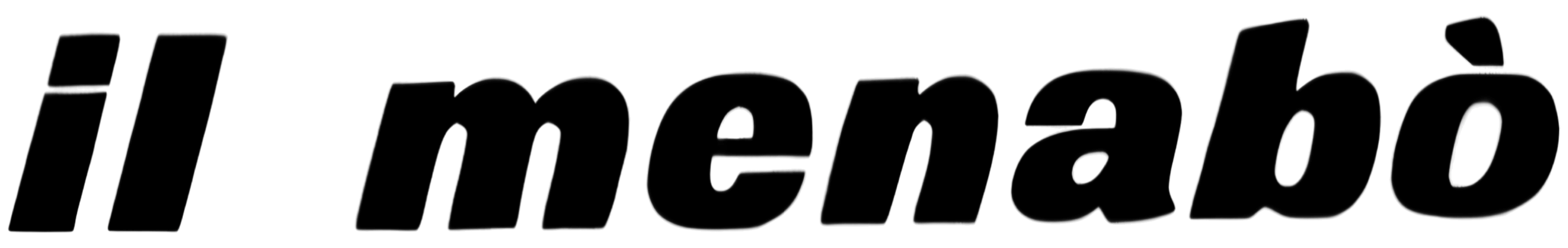
- Editor: Elio Vittorini; Italo Calvino
- Categories: Cultural magazine Literary magazine
- Publisher: Giulio Einaudi
- Founder: Elio Vittorini; Italo Calvino
- Founded: 1959
- First issue: June 1959
- Final issue: 1967
- Country: Italy
- Based in: Turin
- Language: Italian
- ISSN: 1722-7143
- OCLC: 10101745

Il Menabò di letteratura was an Italian cultural and literary magazine published between 1959 and 1967. It was based in Turin, Italy.

== History and profile ==
Il Menabò di letteratura was established in 1959. Its founders were Elio Vittorini and Italo Calvino. The first issue appeared in July 1959. Elio Vittorini and Italo Calvino edited the magazine until 1966. The magazine, published by Giulio Einaudi, had its headquarters in Torino. It covered monographic topics and included writings of novice Italian authors. It also featured writings on newly developed critical literary theories, including Roland Barthes' theory. It had a left-wing and militant stance.

Il Menabò di letteratura ceased publication in 1967.

== See also ==
- List of magazines in Italy
