= Amerika (novel) =

1927 novel by Franz Kafka

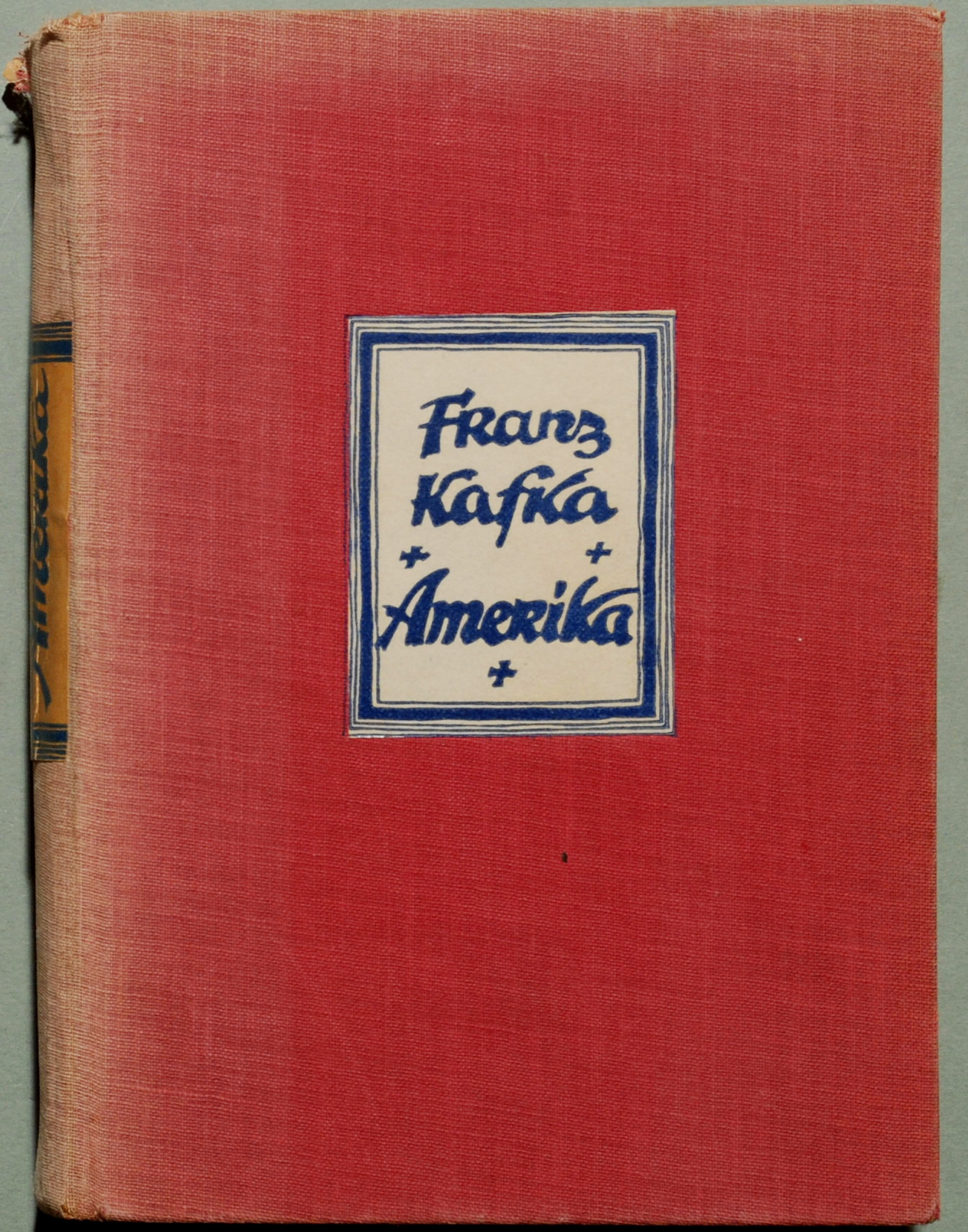
- First published edition
- Editor: Max Brod
- Author: Franz Kafka
- Working title: Der Verschollene
- Language: German
- Published: 1927 (Kurt Wolff) (German); 1938 (Routledge) (English)
- Publication place: Germany
- Media type: Print
- ISBN: 978-0-8112-1569-5
- OCLC: 58600742

Amerika (German working title Der Verschollene, "The Missing"), also known as The Man Who Disappeared (Amerika), Amerika: The Missing Person and Lost in America, is the incomplete first novel by Franz Kafka (1883–1924), written between 1911 and 1914 and published posthumously in 1927. The novel began as a short story titled "The Stoker". The novel incorporates many details of the experiences of Kafka's relatives who had emigrated to the United States. The commonly used title Amerika is from the edition of the text put together by Kafka's close friend, Max Brod, after Kafka's death in 1924. It has been published in several English-language versions, including as Amerika, translated by Edwin and Willa Muir (1938); as The Man Who Disappeared (Amerika), translated by Michael Hofmann (1996); as Amerika: The Missing Person, translated by Mark Harman (2008); as Lost in America, translated by Anthony Northey (2010); and as The Man Who Disappeared (America), translated by Ritchie Robertson (2012).

== Plot summary ==
The first chapter of this novel is a short story titled "The Stoker".

The story describes the bizarre wanderings of sixteen-year-old European immigrant Karl Roßmann (Rossmann), who was forced to go to New York City to escape the scandal of getting a housemaid pregnant. As the ship arrives in the United States, he becomes friends with a stoker who is about to be dismissed from his job. Karl identifies with the stoker and decides to help him; together they go to see the captain of the ship. In a surreal turn of events, Karl's uncle, Senator Jacob, is in a meeting with the captain. Karl does not know that Senator Jacob is his uncle, but Mr. Jacob recognizes him and takes him away from the stoker.

Karl stays with his uncle for some time but is later abandoned by him after making a visit to his uncle's friend without his uncle's full approval. Wandering aimlessly, he becomes friends with two drifters named Robinson and Delamarche. They promise to find him a job, but they sell his suit without permission, eat his food in front of him without offering him any, and ransack his belongings. Finally, Karl departs from them on bad terms after he's offered a job by a manager at Hotel Occidental. He works there as a lift-boy. One day Robinson shows up drunk at his work asking him for money. Afraid of losing his job if seen talking with a friend, which is forbidden for lift-boys, Karl agrees to lend him money, then commits the far worse offence of bunking a drunk-sick Robinson in the lift-boy dorm.

Being dismissed for leaving his post, Karl agrees not only to pay for Robinson's taxi, but also joins him. They travel to Delamarche's place. Delamarche is now staying with a wealthy and obese lady named Brunelda. She wants to take in Karl as her servant. Karl refuses, but Delamarche physically forces him to stay and he is imprisoned in her apartment. He tries to break out, but is beaten by Delamarche and Robinson. On the balcony, he chats with a student who tells him he should stay, because it is hard to find a job elsewhere. He decides to stay.

One day he sees an advertisement for the Nature Theatre of Oklahoma, which is looking for employees. The theatre promises to find employment for everyone. Karl applies for a job and gets engaged as a "technical worker". He is then sent to Oklahoma by train and is welcomed by the vastness of the valleys and adopts the name "Negro" as his own.

== Uncertainties ==
=== Title ===
In conversations Kafka used to refer to this book as his "American novel", later he called it simply The Stoker, after the title of the first chapter, which appeared separately in 1913. Kafka's working title was The Man Who Disappeared (Der Verschollene). The title Amerika was chosen by Kafka's literary executor, Max Brod, who assembled the uncompleted manuscript and published it after his death. Brod donated the manuscript to the University of Oxford.

=== Ending ===
Kafka broke off his work on this novel with unexpected suddenness, and it remained unfinished. From what he told his friend and biographer Max Brod, the incomplete chapter "The Nature Theatre of Oklahoma" (a chapter the beginning of which particularly delighted Kafka, so that he used to read it aloud with great effect) was intended to be the concluding chapter of the work and was supposed to end on a note of reconciliation. In enigmatic language, Kafka used to hint smilingly that within this "almost limitless" theatre his young hero was going to find again a profession, a stand-by, his freedom, even his old home and his parents, as if by some celestial witchery.

The parts of the narrative immediately preceding this chapter are also incomplete. Two large fragments, describing Karl's service with Brunelda, are extant, but do not fill up the gaps. Only the first six chapters were divided and given titles by Kafka.

== Major themes ==
The novel is more explicitly humorous and slightly more realistic (except in the last chapter) than most of Kafka's works, but it shares the same motifs of an oppressive and incomprehensible if not surreal system putting the protagonist repeatedly in bizarre situations. Specifically, within Amerika, a scorned individual often must plead his innocence in front of remote and mysterious figures of authority. However, it is often Karl who voluntarily submits to such treatment (helping a drunk Robinson at the hotel rather than having him thrown out, paying for Robinson's taxi, travelling to Delamarche's home, resigning himself to stay in imprisonment).

In the story, the Statue of Liberty is holding a sword, and some scholars have interpreted this as a "might makes right" philosophy Kafka may have believed the United States held.

== Inspiration ==
Kafka was fond of reading travel books and memoirs. The Autobiography of Benjamin Franklin was one of his favorite books, from which he liked reading passages aloud. Although he always had a longing for free space and distant lands, it is said that he never travelled farther than France and Upper Italy. Despite this, a rare photo shows Kafka with an unidentified man at Marielyst beach in Denmark.

Kafka, at the time, was also reading, or rereading, several novels by Charles Dickens and wrote in his diary: "My intention was, as I now see, to write a Dickens novel, enriched by the sharper lights which I took from our modern times, and by the pallid ones I would have found in my own interior."

Mark Harman, who did the 2008 English translation of Amerika, noted that Kafka acknowledged the influence of Swiss author Robert Walser's "blurring abstractions" in Amerika.

== Adaptations ==
Film and television

- "A Licensed Liberty", a 1990 short film directed by Michael Kreihsl
- "Amerika", a 1966 episode of the BBC anthology drama series Theatre 625, directed by James Ferman
- Amerika oder der Verschollene, a 1969 German TV film aired on ZDF, directed by Zbyněk Brynych
- Klassenverhältnisse ("Class Relations"), a 1984 black-and-white German-language film directed by Jean-Marie Straub and Danièle Huillet
- Amerika, a 1994 Czech film directed by Vladimír Michálek, starring Martin Dejdar as Karl Rossman

Theatre

- Amerika, a play by Ip Wischin, which toured the US in 2004 in a production directed by Geirun Tino
- Amerika, a chamber opera by Samuel Bordoli, performed by the Tête à Tête opera company in 2012

Other

- L'Amérique, ou Le Disparu, a French-language graphic novel by Canadian cartoonist Réal Godbout, published by Les Éditions La Pastèque in 2013. In 2014 it appeared in English, as Amerika (translated by Helge Dascher), published by Conundrum Press.
- The Man Who Disappeared, a 2024 British audio drama for BBC Radio 4, written by Ed Harris, with Divian Ladwa playing Karl Rossman and Fenella Woolgar as the narrator.

== In popular culture ==
The New York performance group Nature Theater of Oklahoma named themselves after the one in Kafka's novel.

German artist Martin Kippenberger attempted to complete the story in his installation The Happy Ending of Franz Kafka's "Amerika".

In 2016, American rock band Young the Giant released the single "Amerika" as part of an inspiration from Kafka's Amerika.
