= Klassenverhältnisse =

Class Relations
- USA release poster
- Directed by: Jean-Marie Straub; Danièle Huillet
- Written by: Franz Kafka (novel)
- Starring: Christian Heinisch; Mario Adorf; Nazzareno Bianconi; Harun Farocki
- Cinematography: William Lubtchansky; Caroline Champetier; Christophe Pollock
- Edited by: Danièle Huillet; Jean-Marie Straub
- Release date: 21 February 1984
- Running time: 126 minutes
- Countries: West Germany; France
- Language: German

Klassenverhältnisse, known in English as Class Relations, in French as Amerika, rapports de classe, is a 1984 film by the French filmmaking duo of Jean-Marie Straub and Danièle Huillet. It is based on Franz Kafka's unfinished first novel, Amerika.

The German filmmaker Harun Farocki appears as one of the leads, and the film also features a cameo from American experimental filmmaker Thom Andersen.

Farocki made a documentary about the filming process, Jean-Marie Straub und Danièle Huillet bei der Arbeit an einem Film.

== Plot ==
The film closely follows the narrative of the novel, depicting the journey of Karl Rossmann, a young man who is sent to America by his parents. As soon as he boards the ship, he encounters a discontented stoker and intervenes in a dispute between the stoker and the ship's captain. To Karl's surprise, the ship's captain turns out to be his uncle, whom he barely knew existed. His uncle welcomes him into his home upon their arrival in America. However, Karl's situation takes a turn when he agrees to help a friend of his uncle's and is subsequently disowned.

Now adrift in America, Karl befriends Delamarche and Robinson, whom he meets while staying at an inn. He struggles to find stable employment, eventually landing a job as a lift operator at a hotel. Despite finding some stability, Karl's job is jeopardized when he shelters a drunken Robinson in their shared dormitory. This act leads to Karl being accused of misconduct and losing his job. His journey continues with a series of setbacks and humiliations, culminating in him finding work at the Oklahoma Theater, where he performs menial technical tasks.

== Cast ==
- Christian Heinisch as Karl Roßmann
- Nazzareno Bianconi as Giacomo
- Mario Adorf as Onkel
- Laura Betti as Brunelda
- Harun Farocki as Delamarche
- Manfred Blank as Robinson
- Reinald Schnell as Heizer
- Anna Schnell as Line
- Klaus Traube as Kapitän
- Georg Brintrup as Student
- Hermann Hartmann as Oberkassierer
- Gérard Semaan as Schubal
- Jean-François Quinque as Stewart
- Villi Vöbel as Pollunder

== Style ==
As Franz Kafka never visited the United States, the film was shot in Europe, with the bulk of shooting occurring in Germany. The film features prominently architecture, flora and costuming (including a policeman in a bobby helmet) that is unlikely to be found in the United States. Only a handful of shots were shot on location in the United States, including the Statue of Liberty and the Missouri River. Though Huillet and Straub are both French, the film was shot primarily in German, the book's original language.

The film was shot on black-and-white 35mm Kodak film stock by French cinematographer William Lubtchansky. Like all other Straub-Huillet films, it only uses location sound recorded at the same time as the image, emphasizing cinema's documentary nature over the pictorial.

== Awards ==
The film was entered into the 34th Berlin International Film Festival where it won an Honourable Mention.
