= Straub–Huillet =

Duo of French filmmakers active 1963–2006

Jean-Marie Straub (French: [stʁob]; 8 January 1933 — 20 November 2022) and Danièle Huillet (pronounced [ɥijɛ]; 1 May 1936 – 9 October 2006) were a duo of French filmmakers who made two dozen films between 1963 and 2006. Their films are noted for their rigorous, intellectually stimulating style and radical, communist politics. While both were French, they worked mostly in Germany and Italy. From the Clouds to the Resistance (1979) and Sicilia! (1999) are among the duo's best regarded works.

== Biography ==
Straub, who was born in Metz, met Paris-born Huillet as a student in 1954. Straub was involved in the Parisian cinephile community at the time. He was friends with Francois Truffaut and contributed to the publication Cahiers du Cinéma, although Truffaut refused to publish Straub's more inflammatory writings. He worked as an assistant to the film director Jacques Rivette on the 1956 film A Fool's Mate. He also worked in Paris as an assistant to Abel Gance, Jean Renoir, Robert Bresson and Alexandre Astruc. The pair later emigrated to West Germany so that Straub could avoid military service in Algeria. Straub spent his first few years researching Bach. Huillet had initially planned to make ethnographic films, but eventually assisted Straub on his projects. In 1963, they made Machorka-Muff, an 18-minute short based on a Heinrich Böll story and their first collaboration. Their next film, the 55-minute Not Reconciled, was also a Böll adaptation.

They did not make a full-length feature until 1968's Chronicle of Anna Magdalena Bach, after which they made films at a fairly even rate, completing a feature every 2–3 years. The production of the Chronicle of Anna Magdalena Bach was very tedious. The struggle for funding lasted for ten years, until 1967. In 1968, they also made a short film starring Rainer Werner Fassbinder and his theatre troupe called The Bridegroom, the Actress and the Pimp. In the mid 1970s, they began producing films in Italy. Increasingly, they began splitting their time between West Germany and Italy, as well as frequently collaborating with French and British producers.

Straub and Huillet lived together for most of their lives. They had no children. Huillet died of cancer in Cholet on 9 October 2006, aged 70. Straub died on 20 November 2022, at the age of 89.

== Style and content ==
All of the films of Straub and Huillet are based on other works: novels, operas, plays and less conventional source materials, such as political writings. Their sources include writings by Marguerite Duras, Franz Kafka, Elio Vittorini and Bertolt Brecht; two operas by Arnold Schoenberg; letters written by Friedrich Engels, Wassily Kandinsky and J.S. Bach; and other films, including Rossellini's Europa '51. Many of their films, such as Klassenverhältnisse, stress the relationship between the original text and the film.

Since their first films Machorka-Muff (1962) and Not Reconciled (1964) were made in West Germany, Huillet and Straub were at the time included in the New German Film, which was loudly announced in the 1962 Oberhausen Manifesto. Frieda Grafe and Enno Patalas wrote about Machorka-Muff: “One should read Böll's book because it has changed through Straub's film. It seems more naked and more serious because now with the last camera movement of the film it always points away from itself to Germany". If the choice of subjects - German post-war themes such as the continuity of fascist-nationalist thought patterns, broken biographies, rearmament - and a certain brittleness in the acting made the first two films typical productions of the time at first glance, the alienating, low-modulation language of the actors, alongside the non-chronological editing technique in Not Reconciled and the unconventional handling of the literary templates by Heinrich Böll, also instilled among colleagues an incomprehension and rejection. At the Oberhausen Short Film Festival in 1963 and the Berlin International Film Festival in 1965, the first two films were rejected by the selection juries and only shown in special events. The third film, Chronik der Anna Magdalena Bach (1967), was made possible by an unprecedented "crowd funding", which was supported by Alexander Kluge, Heinrich Böll, Enno Patalas and the influential magazine Filmkritik. With this film, which had little in common with other West German films of its time, Huillet and Straub entered new stylistic and dramaturgical territory. The sensual center of the film, lacking in conventional film plot, is the music of Johann Sebastian Bach, which is presented here live in front of the camera and partly in original locations - an uncompromising and elaborate appreciation of music in films that Huillet and Straub in the later films Moses and Aron (1974) and From Today to Tomorrow (1996), both based on operas by Arnold Schoenberg.

The style of all Straub and Huillet's films is that they always play with political commitment in different ways ("toute révolution est un coup de dés" - based on Mallarmé's poem about the nature of chance), even in an opera film based on biblical motifs, such as Moses and Aron, whom they dedicated to Holger Meins.

Aesthetically, they were particularly oriented towards the dramaturgical ideas of Bertolt Brecht, for example by saying that the actor should not play his role in an illusionistic way, but that he should identify his activity as what it is: quoting. They have therefore very often worked with amateur actors who used their native dialects in place of perfectly standardized dialogue. Nevertheless, their films are characterized by an unbelievable aesthetic rigor and formal rigor: every shot is precisely constructed, no cut is a concession to convention. But Straub sees himself as a traditionalist and has often expressed his affinity for classic filmmakers such as Kenji Mizoguchi and John Ford.

=== Collaboration ===
Due to his more extroverted nature, Jean-Marie Straub served as the public face of the couple: this has contributed to the widespread assumption that Huillet's role in their filmmaking process was secondary. In reality, the two split their work equally, with Straub responsible for mise en scène, Huillet controlling much of the production design and editing process and the two being equally responsible for the pre-production, texts and rehearsals. This method can be seen in Pedro Costa's documentary Where Does Your Hidden Smile Lie?, filmed during the editing of Sicilia!.

What is special about the work of Huillet and Straub is the often decades-long continuity that they have with many of their employees. They realized most of their work with two cameramen: William Lubtchansky (nine films) and Renato Berta (20 films). The sound engineer Louis Hochet was responsible for the sound recordings for 15 of her films between 1967 and 1998, including the films Chronik der Anna Magdalena Bach (1967), [4] Moses and Aron (1974) and Von heute, which are determined by live recorded music and auf Morgen (1996), each of which broke new ground in integrating music into a film. An equally formative connection existed with the Tuscan town of Buti, which was used primarily as a location for the films based on Cesare Pavese's dialogues with Leuko, as well as with the Teatro Francesco di Bartolo located there, whose ensemble has participated in a total of ten films.

Huillet and Straub often paid tribute to friends and colleagues, such as the filmmakers Peter Nestler, Frans van de Staak, Holger Meins and Jean-Luc Godard or their long-time cameraman Renato Berta. For their part, Straub and Huillet were more often the subject of films by others. Those who have made films about his and her work include Harun Farocki (Jean-Marie Straub and Danièle Huillet working on a film based on Franz Kafka's novel Amerika, 1983), Pedro Costa (Where Does Your Hidden Smile Lie?, 2001) and Peter Nestler (Defense of Time, 2007).

=== Reception ===
Their films have received positive responses from leading film critics: in Germany, for example, those of Enno Patalas, Frieda Grafe, Alexander Kluge, Helmut Färber and Ulrich Gregor, later by Harun Farocki and Hartmut Bitmosky and others; in France, Cahiers du Cinéma, whose authors Michel Delahaye and Serge Daney, later the film critics Bernard Eisenschitz, François Albera and Benoît Turquety; and Filmcritica in Italy, especially its author Adriano Aprá, who also served as the director of the Pesaro film festival for a long time and played the title role in Straub and Huillet's film Othon (1969). The couple's films also found a fan base in the US early on, thanks in large part to the support of arthouse cinema operator Dan Talbot, film critics Jonathan Rosenbaum and J. Hoberman and curator Richard Roud, who was the longtime program director of the London and New York film festivals. Filmmakers Pedro Costa, Deborah Stratman, Thom Andersen and Ted Fendt have cited them as an influence.

Despite some positive criticism, their films were and are often met with incomprehension. Especially in the first decades of Straub-Huillet's filmmaking, the accusation of amateurism was often raised against them from this side. A criticism based on the concept of continuity and the narrative conventions of classical cinema as a set of values finds numerous breaks in the Straub-Huillet cinema. Another point of criticism is the alleged lack of emotion in their films. Lecture as well as gestures and facial expressions of the actors are expressionless, anti-dramatic and deliberately boring.

The last joint-film by Straub and Huillet, These Encounters of Theirs, was part of the competition at the 63rd Venice Film Festival in 2006. At the festival, Straub and Huillet were awarded a special prize "for the invention of cinematic language in their entirety". They received late recognition of the film industry by Jury President Catherine Deneuve. Straub and Huillet were not present during the ceremony. Actress Giovanna Daddi read a statement written by Straub, saying that as long as there was American imperialist capitalism, there could never be enough terrorists in the world. The statement caused some controversy.

After Danièle Huillet's death in 2006, their work became less controversial. Their work received new international recognition in New York, Paris, Madrid, Berlin, London, Lisbon and Tokyo. The retrospectives were preceded by the successful efforts of BELVA-Film (Jean-Marie Straub, Barbara Ulrich) to restore and digitize their entire work.

From January 2019 through September 2020, the streaming service MUBI held the first digital Straub-Huillet retrospective, showcasing new restorations of fifteen of their films, including Straub's final feature film Kommunisten.

== Filmography ==
- Machorka-Muff (1963)
- Nicht versöhnt oder Es hilft nur Gewalt wo Gewalt herrscht (1965)
- The Chronicle of Anna Magdalena Bach (1968)
- Der Bräutigam, die Komödiantin und der Zuhälter (1968)
- Les Yeux ne veulent pas en tout temps se fermer, ou Peut-être qu'un jour Rome se permettra de choisir à son tour (1970)
- Geschichtsunterricht (1972)
- Einleitung zu Arnold Schoenbergs Begleitmusik zu einer Lichtspielscene (1973)
- Moses und Aron (1975)
- Fortini/Cani (1976)
- Toute révolution est un coup de dés (1977)
- Dalla nube alla resistenza (1979)
- En rachâchant (1982)
- Trop tot/trop tard (1982)
- Klassenverhältnisse (also released as Class Relations) (1984)
- Der Tod des Empedokles (1987)
- Schwarze Sünde (1989)
- Paul Cézanne im Gespräch mit Joachim Gasquet (1989)
- Die Antigone des Sophokles nach der Hölderlinschen Übertragung für die Bühne bearbeitet von Brecht 1948 (Suhrkamp Verlag) (1992)
- Lothringen! (1994)
- Von heute auf morgen (1997)
- Sicilia! (1999)
- Operai, contadini (2001)
- Il Ritorno del figlio prodigo - Umiliati (2003)
- Une visite au Louvre (2004)
- These Encounters of Theirs (2006)
- Europa 2005 - 27 octobre (2006) (TV) (uncredited)
- Dialogue d'ombres (2013)
