= The Chronicle of Anna Magdalena Bach =

- Region 1 DVD cover
- Directed by: Jean-Marie Straub; Danièle Huillet
- Written by: Jean-Marie Straub; Danièle Huillet
- Produced by: Gian Vittorio Baldi; Jean-Luc Godard; Jacques Rivette
- Starring: Gustav Leonhardt; Christiane Lang
- Cinematography: Ugo Piccone; Saverio Diamante; Giovanni Canfarelli Modica
- Edited by: Danièle Huillet; Jean-Marie Straub
- Music by: Johann Sebastian Bach
- Production companies: Franz Seitz Filmproduktion; Neue Filmkunst Walter Kirchner; Hessischer Rundfunk
- Distributed by: Neue Filmkunst Walter Kirchner
- Release date: June 1968 (Berlin Film Festival)
- Running time: 94 minutes
- Country: West Germany
- Language: German

The Chronicle of Anna Magdalena Bach (German: Chronik der Anna Magdalena Bach) is a 1968 film by the French filmmaking duo of Jean-Marie Straub and Danièle Huillet. It was their first full-length feature film, and reportedly took a decade to finance. The film stars renowned harpsichordist Gustav Leonhardt as Johann Sebastian Bach and Christiane Lang as Anna Magdalena Bach. The orchestral music was performed by Concentus Musicus and conducted by Nikolaus Harnoncourt. It is the first of several Straub-Huillet films to be based on works of classical music. The film was entered in the 18th Berlin International Film Festival.

Though, as on all of their films, Straub and Huillet contributed to the film equally, Straub is the officially credited director.

== Cast ==
- Gustav Leonhardt – Johann Sebastian Bach
- Christiane Lang – Anna Magdalena Bach
- Paolo Carlini – Hölzel
- Ernst Castelli – Steger
- Hans-Peter Boye – Born
- Joachim Wolff – Rector
- Rainer Kirchner – Superintendent
- Eckart Bruntjen – Prefect Kittler
- Walter Peters – Prefect Krause
- Kathrien Leonhard – Catherina Dorothea Bach
- Anja Fahrmann – Regine Susanna Bach
- Katja Drewanz – Christine Sophie Henrietta Bach
- Bob van Asperen – Johann Elias Bach
- Andreas Pangritz – Wilhelm Friedemann Bach
- Bernd Weikl – Singer in Cantata No. 205
- Nikolaus Harnoncourt – Prince of Anhalt-Köthen

== Style and content ==
The Chronicle of Anna Magdalena Bach consists of excerpts from Johann Sebastian Bach's works, presented in chronological order and linked by a fictional journal written by his second wife, Anna Magdalena Bach. Each work is typically presented in a single, often immobile take, with the musicians performing in the locations where many of the works were premiered, dressed in period costumes.

=== Works featured ===
Works excerpted in the film, in order of appearance, are:

- Brandenburg Concerto No. 5, BWV 1050: Allegro 1 (First Movement), bars 147–227
- Prelude 6 in E major from the Klavierbüchlein für Wilhelm Friedemann Bach, BWV 854
- (French) Suite #1 in D Minor from the Notebook for Anna Magdalena Bach, BWV 812: Minuet 2
- Sonata No. 2 in D major for viola da gamba and obbligato harpsichord, BWV 1028: Adagio
- Trio-sonata No. 2 in C Minor for Organ, BWV 526: Largo
- Magnificat in D major, BWV 243: Sicut locutus est; Gloria (first part)
- Partita #6 in E minor from the Notebook for Anna Magdalena Bach, BWV 830: Gavotte
- Cantata BWV 205 ("Aeolus placated"): Bass recitative ("Ja! Ja! Die Stunden sind nunmehro nah") and Aria ("Wie will ich lustig lachen")
- Cantata BWV 198 (Funeral Ode for Queen Christiane Eberhardine): Final chorus ("Doch, Königin! du stirbest nicht")
- Cantata BWV 244a (Funeral music for Leopold, Prince of Anhalt-Köthen): Aria, "Mit Freuden sei die Welt verlassen" (music lost, reconstructed from St Matthew Passion, BWV 244, "Aus Liebe will mein Heiland sterben")
- St Matthew Passion, BWV 244: Opening chorus ("Kommt, ihr Töchter, helft mir klagen")
- Cantata BWV 42: Sinfonia (Da capo: bars 1–53) and tenor recitative ("Am Abend aber desselbigen Sabbats")
- Prelude in B Minor for Organ, BWV 544, bars 1–17
- Mass in B Minor, BWV 232: Opening (start of the first Kyrie, bars 1–29)
- Cantata BWV 215 (for the coronation of August III): Opening chorus ("Preise dein Glücke, gesegnetes Sachsen"), bars 1–181
- Ascension Oratorio, BWV 11: final chorale, 2nd part
- Conventional Sunday motet (11th after Trinity) by Leo Leonius from the Florilegium Portense
- Clavier-Uebung, BWV 671: Organ-chorale from the 3rd part ("Kyrie, God Holy Spirit")
- Italian Concerto, BWV 971: Andante
- Cantata Wachet auf, ruft uns die Stimme, BWV 140 ("Awake, the voice calls to us"): 1st duet, bars 1–36
- Goldberg Variations, BWV 988: Variation 25
- Cantata BWV 82 ("I am content"), last recitative
- Musical Offering, BWV 1079: Ricercar a 6, harpsichord, bars 1–139
- The Art of Fugue, BWV 1080: Contrapunctus XIV, bars 193–239 (harpsichord), last part
- Chorale for Organ, BWV 668 ("Before thy throne, I tread"), bars 1–11

== Reception ==
On the review aggregator website Rotten Tomatoes, the film holds an approval rating of 100%, based on 7 reviews, with an average rating of 8.6/10.
