= Begleitungsmusik zu einer Lichtspielscene =

1930 orchestral work by Arnold Schoenberg

- by Arnold Schoenberg
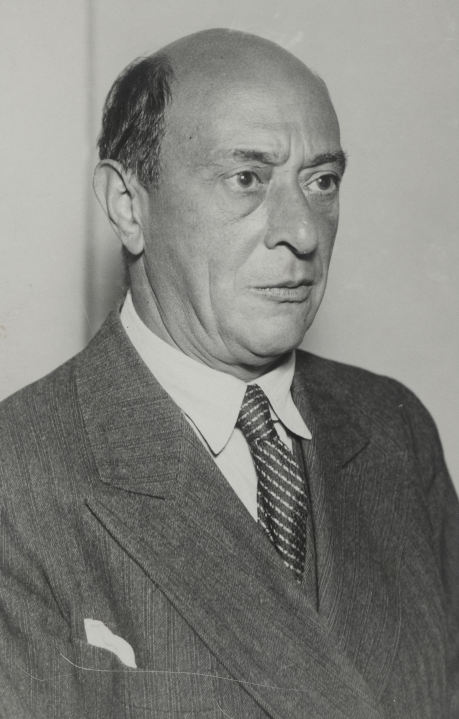
- Schoenberg, c. 1930 (photo by Max Fenichel)
- English: Accompaniment to a Film Scene
- Opus: 34
- Composed: October 15, 1929 – February 14, 1930:
- Publisher: Heinrichshofen Verlag
- Duration: c. 9 minutes
- Scoring: Symphony orchestra

Premiere
- Date: April 8, 1930
- Location: Broadcasting House of the Südwestdeutsche Rundfunkdienst AG; Frankfurt, Germany
- Conductor: Hans Rosbaud
- Performers: Frankfurt Radio Symphony

The Begleitungsmusik zu einer Lichtspielscene (Note: Schoenberg spelled it "lichtspielscene", which is the spelling used in the original edition, but other sources use "lichtspielszene".) (Drohende Gefahr, Angst, Katastrophe), Op. 34 (literally "Accompaniment Music for a Light Play Scene (Threatening Danger, Fear, Catastrophe)")—also known in English as Accompaniment to a Film Scene, Accompaniment to a Cinematographic Scene, Accompaniment to a Cinematic Scene, and Music to Accompany a Cinema Scene—is an orchestral work by Arnold Schoenberg composed in late 1929 and early 1930.

Schoenberg had developed an interest in film as a medium for his own creative work in the years before composing the Begleitungsmusik zu einer Lichtspielscene, but his personal artistic beliefs also made him wary of it.

He composed the Begleitungsmusik zu einer Lichtspielscene for Heinrichshofen Verlag in Magdeburg, which wanted to include it in a commemorative collection of scores they commissioned from German film composers. Schoenberg had no particular film or film scene in mind while composing the work, but he did later consider performing it along with an abstract film. His music was adapted for a short film by Straub–Huillet in 1972.

The reception of the Begleitungsmusik zu einer Lichtspielscene was generally positive; it was encored at its British premiere. The United States premiere in Los Angeles was contentious and the Los Angeles Times refused to review it. Robert Craft and Allen Shawn considered it one of Schoenberg's most attractive works, while Igor Stravinsky called it "best piece of real film music ever written".

== History ==
=== Background ===
Schoenberg had contradictory feelings about film and film music; he aspired to work on film projects, but abhorred the film industry. The artistic possibilities of film interested him, but its essentially collaborative creative process ultimately dissuaded him from exploring it as a vehicle for his own work.

While composing Die glückliche Hand in 1910–1913, Schoenberg had the idea of directing a film that would have depicted the work's drama. He would have had total control over the scripts, acting, music, and any needed edits. He contemplated commissioning Oskar Kokoschka or Wassily Kandinsky to design the sets, as well as using colorization in order to depict the work's symbolistic use of color and light. He explained to Emil Hertzka:

[T]he basic unreality of the events, which is inherent in the words, is something that they should be able to bring out even better in the filming (nasty idea that it is!). For me this is one of the main reasons for considering it. For instance, in the film, if the goblet suddenly vanishes as if it had never been there, just as if it had simply been forgotten, that is quite different from the way it is on the stage, where it has to be removed by some device. And there are a thousand things besides that [can] be easily done in this medium, whereas the stage's resources are very limited. My foremost wish is therefore for something the opposite of what the cinema generally aspires to. I want: the utmost unreality!

In 1927, Schoenberg wrote an essay for the Neues Wiener Tagblatt wherein he worried that the rise of film would result in the decline of opera:

The opera [...] has less to offer the eye than the film does—and color film will soon be here too. Add music, and the general public will hardly need to hear an opera sung and acted any more, unless a new path is found.

While participating in sound film experiments in September of that same year at the studios of Universum-Film AG in Berlin, Schoenberg was recorded on film stating:

One should not consider the talking film to be simply a coupling of picture, language, and music. On the contrary, it is a completely new and independent instrument for innovative artistic expression. In this sense it has a great future. It is surely here through the force of the Idea that the word and art music will soon gain decisive influence. Therefore, the application of overall standards will become the rule, standards that up to now could only be reached by exceptionally gifted personalities like Chaplin. Namely: standards of artistic value! [...] [N]ow true [German] artists will be able to grant to [film] true and deep ideas and emotions: then marketability of broad mass appeal will certainly no longer alone determine production; then German film will achieve the position that corresponds to its poets and musicians!

In a later essay written in 1940, he rebuked this speech, explaining that he had expected a "renaissance of the arts" with the advent of sound film. "How wrong I had been!", he added.

When Schoenberg emigrated to Los Angeles in October 1933, one of his primary reasons for choosing the city was to be near the film industry, where he hoped to influence film music through his work as a teacher. During a conversation with Dika Newlin on April 8, 1940, he told her that he believed film music could never be good.

=== Composition ===
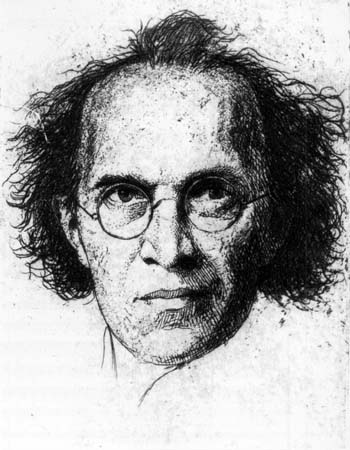
Franz Schreker encouraged Schoenberg's interest in working in film.

At the time of the creation of the Begleitungsmusik zu einer Lichtspielscene, Schoenberg had succeeded Ferruccio Busoni as professor of composition at the Prussian Academy of Arts, earned a comfortable living, and his music was regularly performed in major cities across Europe, which brought him international renown. Additionally, he had achieved a level of mastery with twelve-tone technique that allowed him to begin applying it to large-scale forms, evidence of which is discernible in the Begleitungsmusik zu einer Lichtspielscene.

He also began to seriously pursue working in film and sought guidance from the Gesellschaft der Filmmusikautoren Deutschlands. Upon hearing this, his friend Franz Schreker, a proponent for improving the standards of film music, invited him to work with the Deutsche Gesellschaft für Ton und Bild and, later in 1932, Comedia Tonfilm. Schoenberg consulted with Klaus Pringsheim about the former organization, but was especially enthusiastic at the idea of working with the latter.

The idea for the Begleitungsmusik zu einer Lichtspielscene originated from F. Charles Adler, at the time music director of the Düsseldorf Municipal Opera and an agent for Heinrichshofen Verlag in Magdeburg, which published a number of film scores and owned a library of photoplay music. Adler liaisoned between Schoenberg and Heinrichshofen Verlag during negotiations; he also coordinated the work's eventual publication, one of several commissioned by the publisher from German film composers for a commemorative collection. The structure of the Begleitungsmusik zu einer Lichtspielscene, as well as its evocative sub-titles, recalled photoplay music. A collection of photoplay music published by Universal Edition in 1927 includes a cue composed by Gustav Lindner called "Drohende Gefahr" (Threatening Danger), which Schoenberg also used in his work's subtitle.

Schoenberg began to work on the music after September 20, 1929, when he returned from his vacation in the Netherlands; he resumed work at the Prussian Academy of Arts in early October. The negative of the manuscript score indicates a starting date of October 15, but preparations for the premiere and publication of the opera Von heute auf morgen, as well as guest conducting engagements in London, detained his progress. The score was completed on February 14, 1930.

Schoenberg neither had any film or film scene in mind while composing Begleitungsmusik zu einer Lichtspielscene, nor did he initially contemplate a later use for the score as incidental music. He also did not demarcate which sections in the score corresponded to the moods of "Threatening Danger", "Fear", and "Catastrophe" referred to in the work's subtitle. Because of this, attempts at realizing Begleitungsmusik zu einer Lichtspielscene in the style of the photoplay music they allude to would be unfeasible. It is not clear whether the subtitle was added during or after the work's composition.

Originally, he envisioned a more elaborate program for the work, as well as a choice between two possible endings:

- I. Quiet—short (the calm before the storm)
- II. The threatening Danger appears
- III. The Threatened become anxious
- IV. The Danger draws closer
- V. The Threatened become aware of the Danger
- VI. The Danger grows
- VII. The fear grows ever greater
- VIIIa. Catastrophe
- IXa. Collapse
- VIIIb. The Danger passes
- IXb. Alleviation of the tension of the Threatened (salvation, deliverance)

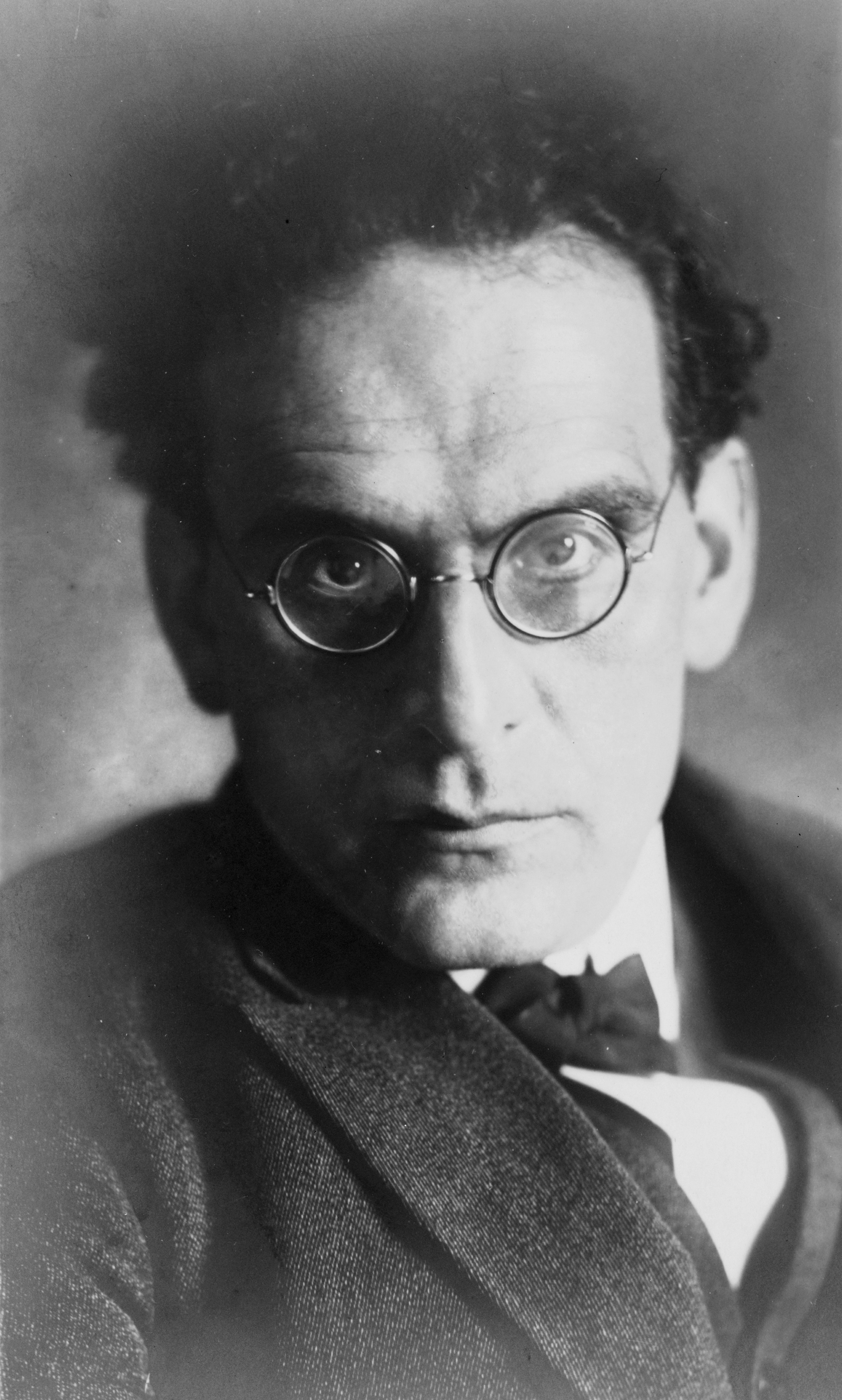
Otto Klemperer suggested performing the music with an abstract film.

During the preparations for the first concert performance, Otto Klemperer wrote to Schoenberg that the work could benefit from being played with an abstract film, suggesting László Moholy-Nagy as a collaborator. Schoenberg replied:

I find your suggestion about the abstract film, after thinking it over and over, very tempting indeed, since it solves the problem of this "music to no film". Only one thing, the horror of the Berlin staging of my two stage works, the abomination which was here committed because of lack of faith, missing talent, ignorance, and thoughtlessness, and which has damaged my works very deeply in spite of the musical accomplishments, this horror is still making me shake all over too much, so that I must be very cautious. How shall I protect myself against such matters? I do not know Mr. Moholy. But if I have especially bad luck, then he combines the rascally, ignorant skepticism of a Mr. Rabenalt with the unimaginative decency of Mr. Schlemmer. There seems to be only one way: that Mr. Moholy works on the film together with me (in that case there is at least one participant who can think of something). But perhaps that can be done?

Schoenberg declined to explore Klemperer's idea further.

== Music ==
Similarly to Schoenberg's Variations for Orchestra, the Begleitungsmusik zu einer Lichtspielscene does not open with a statement of its twelve-note row, but with a brief introduction, after which it unfolds in free variation form. Although its textures are simpler than that of the Variations for Orchestra, Schoenberg uses a wide array of orchestral techniques. The interval of the minor third, which carries connotations of "tragedy", is frequently used; overall the key of E♭ minor is implied. The work ends with a recollection of its opening.

Carl Dahlhaus called the Begleitungsmusik zu einer Lichtspielscene a return to the symphonic poem, a form that Schoenberg had used often in his early works, and classified it as "program music in dodecaphonic technique".

A typical performance takes approximately nine minutes.

=== Instrumentation ===
The instrumentation for Begleitungsmusik zu einer Lichtspielscene is as follows:

Woodwinds

1 flute (doubling piccolo)
1 oboe
2 clarinets
1 bassoon

Brass

2 French horns
2 trumpets
1 trombone

Percussion

timpani

bass drum
snare drum
tam-tam
triangle
tambourine
glockenspiel
xylophone
piano

Strings

1st violins
2nd violins
violas
cellos
double basses

According to Malcolm MacDonald, the proportion of the orchestra, added piano and percussion notwithstanding, is "almost Classical-sized".

=== Manuscript ===
During World War II, the original manuscript score, along with the rest of Heinrichshofen Verlag's archives, was stored in a salt mine in Staßfurt. It is lost and presumed destroyed.

== Premieres ==
The world premiere of the Begleitungsmusik zu einer Lichtspielscene occurred on April 28, 1930, at the Broadcasting House of the Südwestdeutsche Rundfunkdienst AG in Frankfurt, Germany. It was performed by the Frankfurt Radio Symphony conducted by Hans Rosbaud. This performance, according to Sabine Feisst, was "apparently not considered a real premiere". It was subsequently forgotten about in Schoenberg studies and only rediscovered in 1988.

The first concert performance, which for decades was considered the world premiere, occurred on November 6, 1930, at the Kroll Opera House in Berlin, with the Orchestra of the Kroll Opera conducted by Klemperer. This was followed by the British premiere on May 8, 1931, played by the BBC Symphony Orchestra conducted by Anton Webern; the performance was broadcast by the BBC. The work was encored for the studio audience after the broadcast. The North American premiere took place at the National Theatre in Havana, Cuba, on April 30, 1933; it was played by the Havana Philharmonic Orchestra conducted by Nicolas Slonimsky. He also conducted the United States premiere at the Hollywood Bowl on July 23, 1933, with the Los Angeles Philharmonic Orchestra.

== Reception ==
=== Success in Europe ===
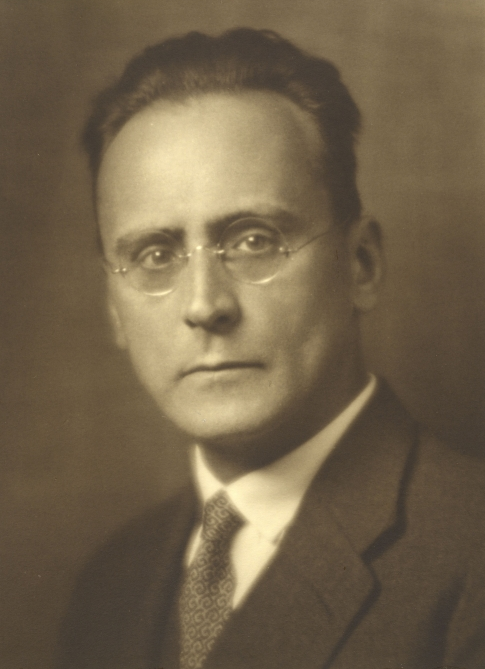
Anton Webern's performances of the Begleitungsmusik zu einer Lichtspielscene were successful with audiences in London and Vienna.

After the world premiere conducted by Rosbaud, Theodor W. Adorno described the Begleitungsmusik zu einer Lichtspielscene in a review as a "succinct introduction to twelve-note technique". Its concert premiere conducted by Klemperer resulted in a significant success for Schoenberg. Among those in the audience was Igor Stravinsky. Schoenberg himself was unable to attend because of illness. Afterwards, he wrote to Heinrich Jalowetz: "People do seem to like the piece: ought I to draw any conclusions from that as to its quality? I mean: the public apparently likes it."

After having conducted the Austrian premiere of the Begleitungsmusik zu einer Lichtspielscene on January 31, 1932, Webern wrote to Schoenberg:

It is a wonderful piece, exciting beyond all measure. A marvelous sound. The structure of the ideas is magnificent. And the ending! The epilogue. Unprecedented, dearest friend! Totally overwhelming!

A subsequent Viennese performance scheduled later that year became involved in a preexisting dispute between the ISCM, its co-founder Edward J. Dent, and Schoenberg. Despite the organization's desire to perform both the Begleitungsmusik zu einer Lichtspielscene and Friede auf Erden at the 1932 ISCM Festival, Schoenberg refused to grant them permission. A compromise was reached by including both works at a special concert of the Workers' Symphony Orchestra, conducted by Webern, that took place on June 21, 1932, during the ISCM Festival, but apart from it. The performance of the Begleitungsmusik zu einer Lichtspielscene, part of a program that also included Gustav Mahler's Symphony No. 2 and the Viennese premiere of Alban Berg's Der Wein, was another major success. Webern's "fanatically dedicated" performance was praised by the Wiener Zeitung; the ovation that greeted the Begleitungsmusik zu einer Lichtspielscene continued several minutes into the concert's intermission.

=== Antipathy in the United States ===
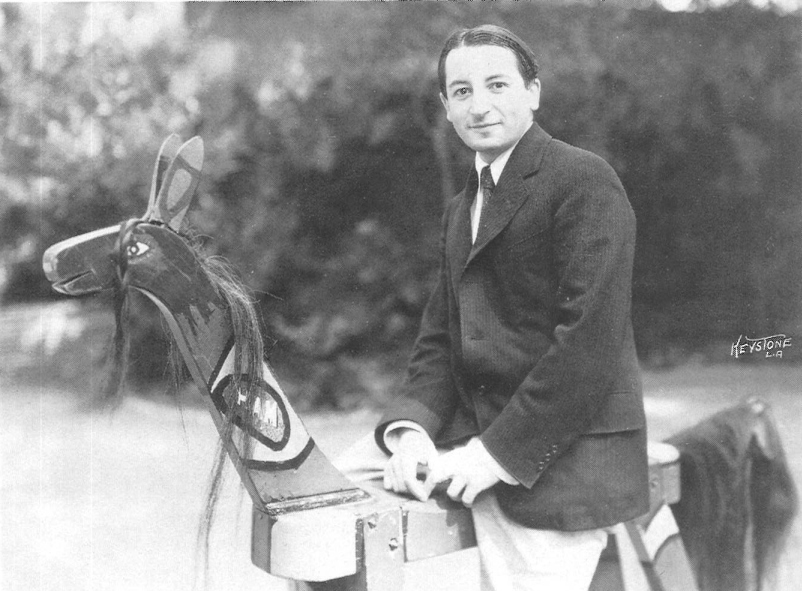
Nicolas Slonimsky conducted the North American and United States premieres in Havana and Los Angeles respectively.

Slonimsky conducted the Begleitungsmusik zu einer Lichtspielscene with great success in Cuba in April 1933, but listeners and the press in Southern California were strongly opposed to it when he conducted its United States premiere in July. It was the first performance by the Los Angeles Philharmonic of a dodecaphonic work. Isabel Morse Jones, the music critic for the Los Angeles Times, refused to review the concert. On the day of the performance, she published an editorial attacking Slonimsky's competence as a conductor and accused him of performing modern music as a way of "seeking publicity and an easy ladder to fame". His engagement with the Los Angeles Philharmonic was terminated after the Schoenberg performance. Schoenberg was grateful to Slonimsky for championing his newest music and befriended him when he came to settle in Los Angeles in October. In 1977, Slonimsky told an interviewer that the performance had "proved to [Schoenberg] that I was the good guy and the rest were bad guys".

Schoenberg had included the Begleitungsmusik zu einer Lichtspielscene on a Boston Symphony Orchestra program scheduled for January 11, 1934, that was intended to be his United States debut as a conductor, but he canceled because of back strain, and the work was not played.

Later performances in the United States continued to arouse critical antipathy. In a review for a 1953 performance by the Boston Symphony Orchestra conducted by Richard Burgin, a music critic for the Boston Globe wrote:

This essay in the 12-tone style [...] [is] a sort of mood music for an imaginary film. Despite its complex organization and evident difficulty, this music of Schoenberg to me is merely another in the lengthening parade of 12-tone pieces which rasp, scratch, whine, and make what I believe Ernest Newman once described as "nasty noises". To be sure, there is a superficial sense of vague emotional unpleasantness about it, but not much.

=== Later appraisals ===
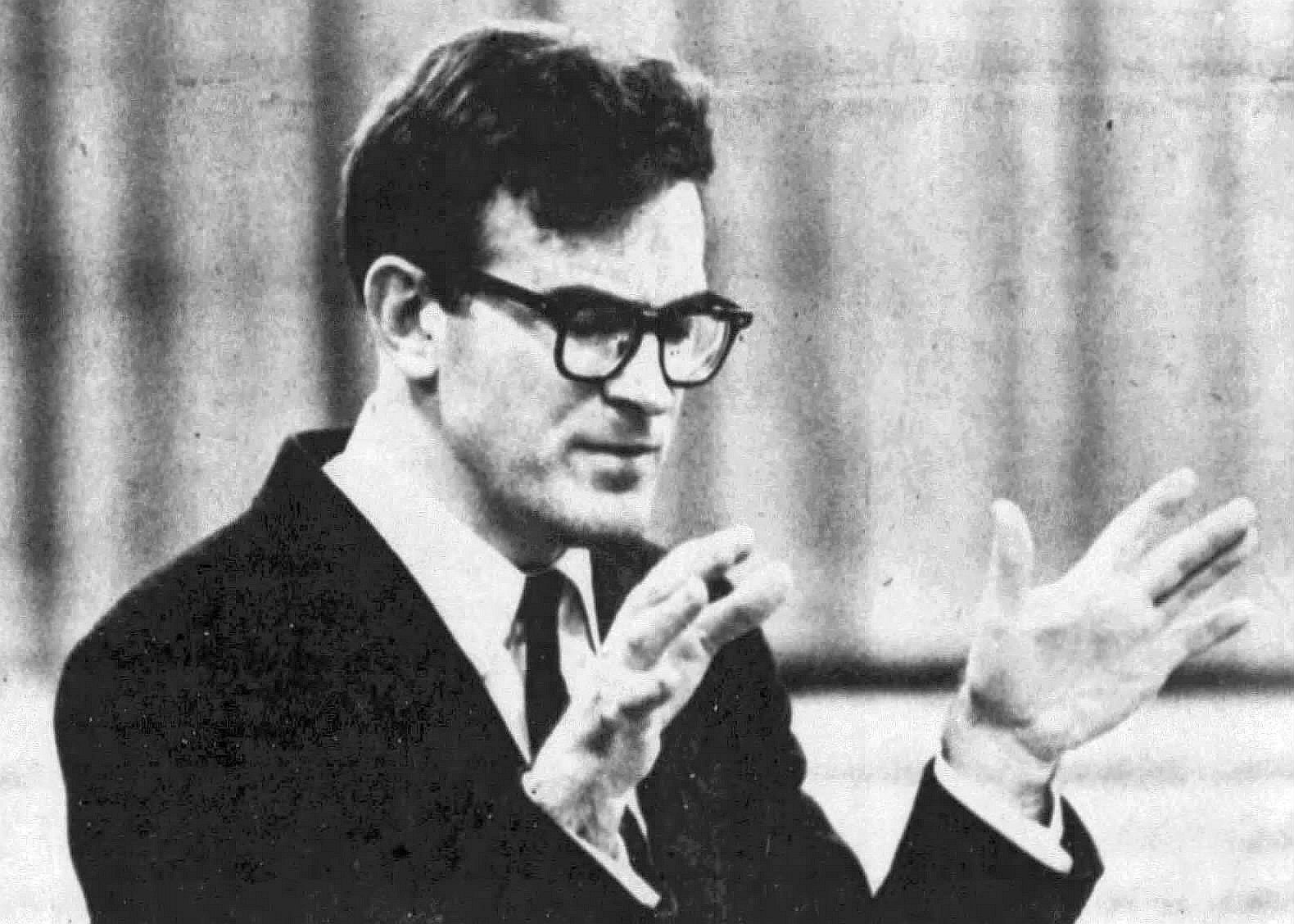
Robert Craft in 1967

Adorno and Hanns Eisler, who had studied with Schoenberg, praised the Begleitungsmusik zu einer Lichtspielscene in their 1947 book, Composing for the Films, and cited it as an example for film composers to draw from:

Schoenberg's music for an imaginary film [...] is full of a sense of fear, of looming danger, of catastrophe, is a landmark pointing the way for a full and accurate use of the new musical resources.

Robert Craft championed Schoenberg's music in Los Angeles during the 1950s, which garnered the approval of the composer. He continued programing and conducting it after Schoenberg's death. At a cookout hosted by Schoenberg's widow, Gertrud, on July 29, 1953, he met with George Balanchine. Craft, who had heard that the choreographer was seeking a suitable Schoenberg work to adapt into a ballet, suggested to him the Begleitungsmusik zu einer Lichtspielscene. In 1960, he also recorded the work for Columbia Records. He wrote in the album's liner notes:

Rarely has such intensifying music been packed so successfully into so small a compass. [...] [A]ny listener must recognize that the surface qualities of the music, the sonorities, the rhythms, the immediate apprehendability of the form establish the work as the most accessible Schoenberg of the period.

Reviewing the same LP, Claudia Cassidy praised both the music and Craft's performance. After a November 17, 1960, performance by the Chicago Symphony Orchestra conducted by Rosbaud, she wrote of the work:

The [Begleitungsmusik zu einer Lichtspielscene] strikes directly at the mind which it instantly disorients by surrounding it with the haunted, reverberant loneliness of a world without familiar landmarks, a world floating in space and oddly unidentifiable since it is as much jungle as desert. The music dates back to 1940 [sic] and many a score has moaned like a lost soul since. The difference is that in a master hand this world of the lost is as achingly real as the most indelible hallucination.

Later in life, Klemperer, who disliked most of Schoenberg's atonal works, called the Begleitungsmusik zu einer Lichtspielscene a "very, very good piece"; he rated it, along with Erwartung and the String Trio, among the works by Schoenberg he liked best.

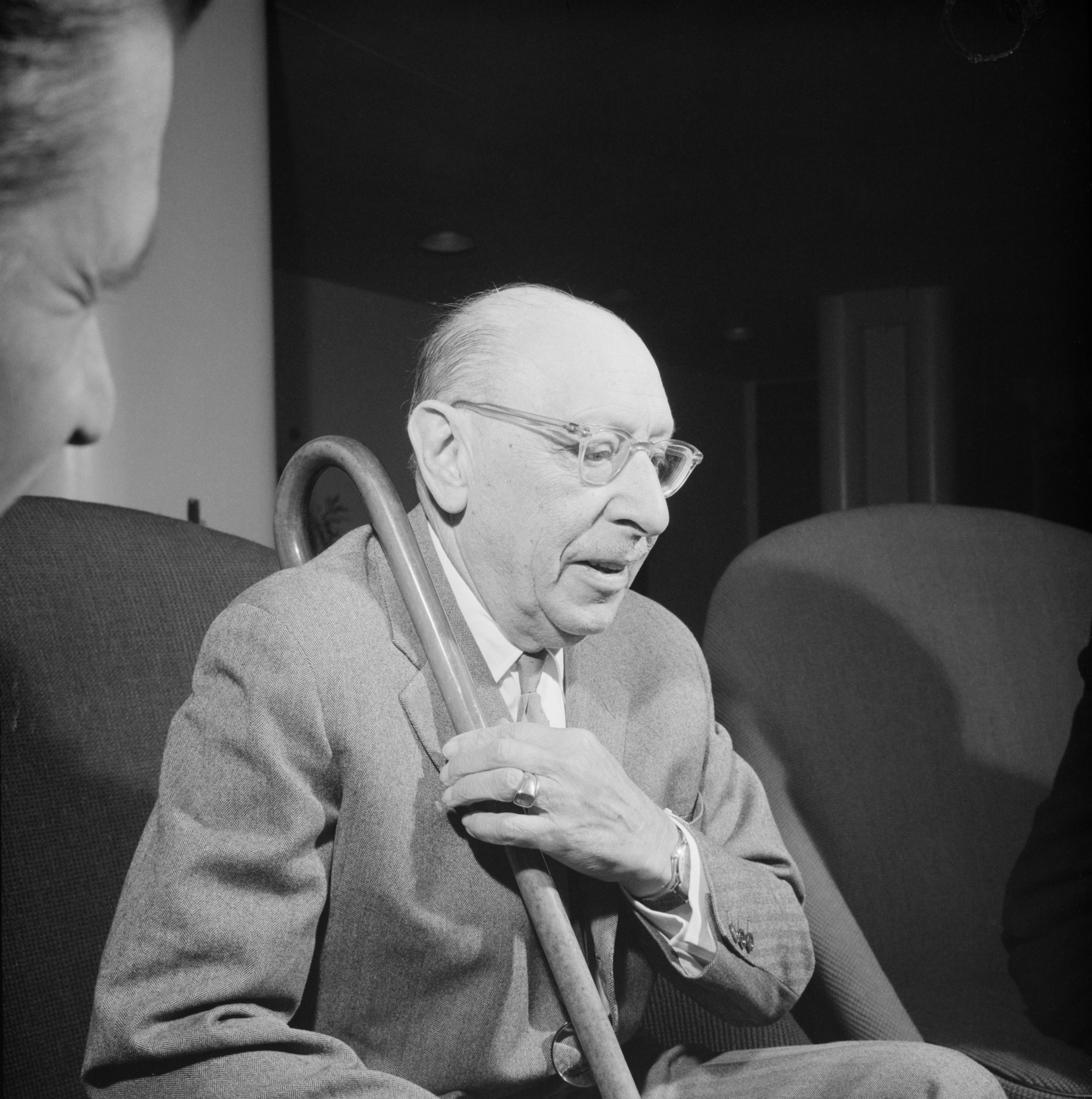
Igor Stravinsky called the Begleitungsmusik zu einer Lichtspielscene the "best piece of real film music ever written".

Stravinsky also held the work in high regard. He told Craft:

[It] is by far the best piece of real film music ever written, an ironic triumph if ever were there one, for the film itself was imaginary.

The filmic and programmatic quality of the work was a crucial part of its appeal, according to Carl Dahlhaus, who wrote that its listeners are prepared to accept dissonances they otherwise would not "since it is only film music". He added that it is "illustrative music of the utmost constructive rigor", but felt that Schoenberg had "paid a price" for its sophistication with a "coarsening of the formal conception".

In 2002, Allen Shawn referred to the "concise and moody" Begleitungsmusik zu einer Lichtspielscene as one of Schoenberg's "most immediately appealing twelve-tone works". He also described the work as feeling like a "foresight" of the rise of the NSDAP.

== Film adaptations ==
In 1972, Straub–Huillet made a film titled Einleitung zu Arnold Schoenbergs Begleitmusik zu einer Lichtspielscene (Introduction to Arnold Schoenberg's Accompaniment to a Film Scene). The 15-minute film layers Schoenberg's music over recitations of a letter he wrote to Kandinsky in 1923 decrying anti-Semitism in Germany and a 1933 speech made by Bertolt Brecht, combined with archival footage of the Paris Commune and the Vietnam War.

At the 1979 Ojai Music Festival, Lukas Foss and William Malloch programmed the Begleitungsmusik zu einer Lichtspielscene with a screening of a scene from F. W. Murnau's Nosferatu. Martin Bernheimer wrote in the Los Angeles Times that their adaptation had "served its vague illustrative purpose reasonably well". After Foss presented the same adaptation at a concert with the Brooklyn Philharmonic Orchestra on February 13, 1981, Bill Zakariasen wrote in his review that it was a "stroke of genius" and an "absolutely brilliant idea".
