= Elio Vittorini =

Italian writer and novelist (1908–1966)

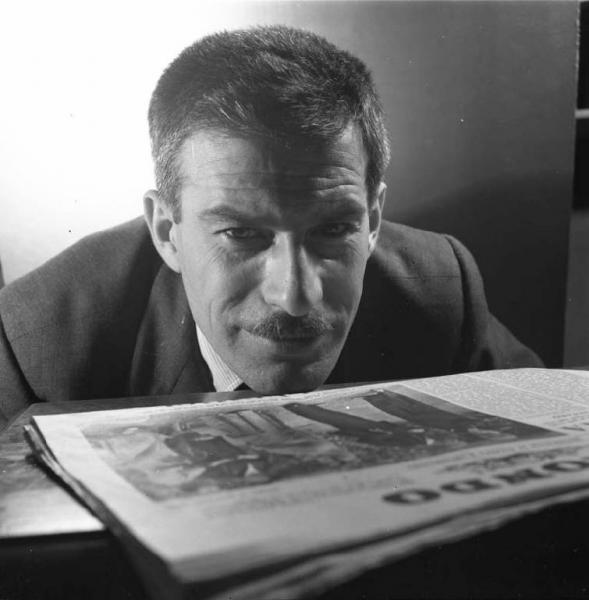
- Vittorini in 1949
- Born: 23 July 1908; Syracuse, Sicily, Kingdom of Italy
- Died: 12 February 1966 (aged 57); Milan, Lombardy, Italy
- Occupations: Writer; novelist; editor; politician
- Writing career
- Language: Italian
- Notable work: Conversations in Sicily (1941)

Elio Vittorini (Italian: [ˈɛːljo vittoˈriːni]; 23 July 1908 – 12 February 1966) was an Italian writer and novelist. He was a contemporary of Cesare Pavese and an influential voice in the modernist school of novel writing. His best-known work, in English speaking countries, is the anti-fascist novel Conversations in Sicily, for which he was jailed when it was published in 1941. The first U.S. edition of the novel, published in 1949, included an introduction from Ernest Hemingway, whose style influenced Vittorini and that novel in particular.

Vittorini was one of the most prominent writers of Italian Neorealism in literature. His own works of fiction, along with his translations of such American and English writers as William Saroyan, D. H. Lawrence, William Faulkner, and Ernest Hemingway, had a considerable impact on the movement and on Italian post-war literature.

== Life ==
Vittorini was born in Syracuse, Sicily, and throughout his childhood moved around Sicily with his father, a railroad worker. Several times he ran away from home, culminating in his leaving Sicily for good in 1924. For a brief period, he found employment as a construction worker in the Julian March, after which he moved to Florence to work as a type corrector (a line of work he abandoned in 1934 due to lead poisoning). Around 1927 his work began to be published in literary journals. In many cases, separate editions of his novels and short stories from this period, such as The Red Carnation were not published until after World War II, due to fascist censorship. In 1937, he was expelled from the National Fascist Party for writing in support of the Republican side in the Spanish Civil War.

In 1939 he moved, this time to Milan. An anthology of American literature which he edited was, once more, delayed by censorship. Remaining an outspoken critic of Benito Mussolini's regime, Vittorini was arrested and jailed in 1942. He joined the Italian Communist Party and began taking an active role in the Resistance, which provided the basis for his 1945 novel Men and not Men. Also in 1945, he briefly became the editor of the Italian Communist daily L'Unità and weekly Il Politecnico .

After the war, Vittorini chiefly concentrated on his work as editor, helping publish work by young Italians such as Calvino and Fenoglio. His last major published work of fiction during his lifetime was 1956's Erica and her Sisters. The news of the events of the Hungarian Uprising deeply shook his convictions in Communism and made him decide to largely abandon writing, leaving unfinished work which was to be published in unedited form posthumously. For the remainder of his life, Vittorini continued in his post as an editor. In 1959, he co-founded with Calvino Il Menabò, a cultural journal devoted to literature in the modern industrial age. He also ran as a candidate on an Italian Socialist Party list. He died in Milan in 1966. He was an atheist.

== Partial bibliography ==
- Racconti di piccola borghesia (1931)
- Il garofano rosso (Translated as The Red Carnation, 1933)
- Conversazione in Sicilia (Translated as Conversations in Sicily, 1941)
- Uomini e no (Translated as Men and not Men, 1945)
- Il Sempione strizza l'Ochio al Frejus (1947) (Translated as Tune for an Elephant, 1955)
- Le donne di Messina (1949) (Translated by Frances Frenaye, Women of Messina, 1973)
- Erica e suoi fratelli (Translated as Erica, 1956)

He also translated the works of Defoe, Poe, Steinbeck, Faulkner, Lawrence, Maugham and others into Italian.

== Sources ==
Biographies

- Un padre e un figlio. Biografia famigliare di Elio Vittorini by Demetrio Vittorini. Bellinzona [Switzerland]: Salvioni, 2000. (Demetrio Vittorini is Elio Vittorini's son.)
