= Jérôme Robart =

French actor, producer and playwright (born 1970)

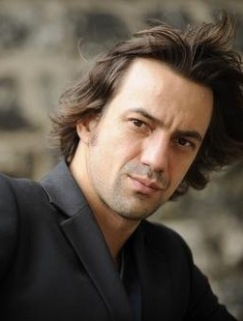
- Robart in 2013
- Born: 27 May 1970 (age 56); Montreuil, Seine-Saint-Denis, France
- Occupations: Actor; producer; playwright
- Years active: 1993–present

Jérôme Robart (born 27 May 1970) is a French actor, producer and playwright.

== Early life ==
Robart was trained at the French National Academy of Dramatic Arts in Paris, from 1993 to 1996, dividing his artistic activities between theatre and film, directing, acting, and writing.

== Career ==
In 2000, Jérôme Robart created his first play Tes which he directed and co-produced with the National Dramatic Centres of Bordeaux and Orléans.

In 2001, his second play, Eddy, f. de pute was coproduced by the Théâtre Ouvert of Paris, the National Dramatic Centre of Bordeaux and Le Poche of Geneva. For France Culture, he also wrote Psychanalyse d’un vampire.

In 2003, he began formal studies in directing. This was an opportunity for him to collaborate notably with Bob Wilson and Claude Stratz.

In the theatre, Robart has been directed by Christophe Perton, Joël Jouanneau, Jorge Lavelli, Jean-Louis Thamin, and Stéphanie Loïk in plays by Rodrigo Garcia, Lionel Spycher, Luigi Pirandello, Bernard Manciet, and Jean Audureau.

In films, he has appeared in Charlie Says directed by Nicole Garcia. He has also worked with Alain Tanner, Marina de Van and Philippe Garrel.

From 2008 to 2017, he played the title role of an 18th-century Parisian police commissioner in the Nicolas Le Floch series of television films, broadcast in France on France 2, and inspired by the series of historical detective novels by Jean-François Parot.

== Filmography ==
=== Film ===
Film
| Year | Title | Role | Notes |
|---|---|---|---|
| 1994 | La poudre aux yeux | Student | |
| 1998 | Places in Cities | Nicolas | |
| 1999 | Jonas et Lila, à demain | Jonas | |
| 2000 | Malraux, tu m'étonnes | André Malraux | |
| 2005 | Regular Lovers | | |
| 2006 | Charlie Says | Ballhaus | |
| 2008 | Frontier of the Dawn | | |
| 2009 | Ah! La libido | | |
| 2011 | A Burning Hot Summer | Paul | |
| 2020 | Home Front | | |

=== Short ===
Film
| Year | Title | Role | Notes |
|---|---|---|---|
| 1995 | Bien sous tous rapports | Olivier | |
| 1996 | Velvet 99 | Surgeon | |
| 1996 | La belle bleue | | |
| 1997 | Tir | | |
| 2004 | Noli me tangere | Etienne | |
| 2004 | Les Héritiers | | |
| 2009 | En douce | | |
| 2014 | Je, tue, île | | |
| 2017 | Un coeur de femme | | |

=== Television ===
Film
| Year | Title | Role | Notes |
|---|---|---|---|
| 1997 | Un Homme | | |
| 2002 | Vertiges | Nicolas | |
| 2004 | Tout va bien c'est Noël! | Sylvain Bréaud | |
| 2005 | Joséphine, ange gardien | Guillaume Favre | TV series (1 Episode : "Robe noire pour un ange") |
| 2005 | Fargas | Duquesne | |
| 2006 | Une saison Sibélius | | |
| 2007 | Les Bleus | | |
| 2007-2008 | Reporters | Thomas Schneider | |
| 2008 | Nicolas Le Floch : L'Homme au ventre de plomb | Le commissaire Nicolas Le Floch | |
| 2008 | Nicolas Le Floch : L'Énigme des blancs-manteaux | Le commissaire Nicolas Le Floch | |
| 2009 | Nicolas Le Floch : Le Fantôme de la Rue Royale | Le commissaire Nicolas Le Floch | |
| 2009 | Nicolas Le Floch : L’Affaire Nicolas Le Floch | Le commissaire Nicolas Le Floch | |
| 2010 | Nicolas Le Floch : La Larme de Varsovie | Le commissaire Nicolas Le Floch | |
| 2010 | Nicolas Le Floch : Le Grand Veneur | Le commissaire Nicolas Le Floch | |
| 2010 | 10 | Vincent | |
| 2012 | Nicolas Le Floch : Le Dîner de gueux | Le commissaire Nicolas Le Floch | |
| 2012 | Nicolas Le Floch : Le Crime de la rue des Francs-Bourgeois | Le commissaire Nicolas Le Floch | |
| 2010 | Nicolas Le Floch : Le Grand Veneur | Le commissaire Nicolas Le Floch | |
| 2012 | Nicolas Le Floch : Le Dîner de gueux | Le commissaire Nicolas Le Floch | |
| 2012 | Nicolas Le Floch : Le Crime de la rue des Francs-Bourgeois | Le commissaire Nicolas Le Floch | |
| 2012 | Mafiosa | Sebastien Acquaviva | |
| 2012 | Un village français | Vincent | |
| 2012 | Médecin-chef à la Santé | Olivier Meignan | |
| 2013 | Nicolas Le Floch : Le Crime de l’hôtel Saint-Florentin | Le commissaire Nicolas Le Floch | |
| 2013 | Nicolas Le Floch : Le Sang des farines | Le commissaire Nicolas Le Floch | |
| 2013 | Candice Renoir | Stéphane Queyrolles | |
| 2014 | Paris (série télévisée) | Ange | |
| 2015 | Le Vagabond de la Baie de Somme | Paul Beaujour | |
| 2016 | Le Mari de mon mari | Antoine | |
| 2016 | Caïn (TV series) | David Wilcker | |
| 2016 | Nicolas Le Floch : Le Cadavre anglais | Le commissaire Nicolas Le Floch | |
| 2018 | Nicolas Le Floch : Le Noyé du Grand canal | Le commissaire Nicolas Le Floch | |
| 2018 | Ma mère, le crabe et moi | Franck Parfenon | |
| 2019 | Profilage | Gabriel | |
| 2019 | Amours à mort | Clément Leroy | |
| 2019 | Crimes parfaits | Lucas | TV series (1 Episode : "Trop beau pour être vrai") |
| 2019 | Prière d'enquêter | Franck | |
| 2019 | H24 | The priest | TV series (Episode 5) |

== Clip ==
=== Actor ===
- 1993 : Tranquille by Sinclair
- 1995 : The Universal by Blur (band)
- 2012 : L'incommunicabilité by Cécilia H.
- 2014 : Ta bite by Circé Deslandes

=== Director ===
- 2011 : L'attente de Circé Deslandes, codirected with Cécilia Halatre
- 2011 : Allô de Circé Deslandes, codirected with Cécilia Halatre
- 2014 : Exquis cadavre, codirected with avec Circé Deslandes

== Theatre ==
=== Actor ===
- 1995-1996 : Hélène by Jean Audureau, dir by Jean-Louis Thamin
- 1996 : Per el Yiyo by Bernard Manciet, dir by Jean-Louis Thamin
- 1997-1998 : Six Characters in Search of an Author by Luigi Pirandello, dir by Jorge Lavelli - Théâtre National Populaire in Villeurbanne, Théâtre de l'Eldorado
- 1998-1999 : Pitbull by Lionel Spycher, dir by Joël Jouanneau
- 2001 : 9 mm by Lionel Spycher, dir by Stéphanie Loïk
- 2001-2003 : Notes de cuisine by Rodrigo Garcia, dir by Christophe Perton
- 2005 : Marcia Hesse by Fabrice Melchiot, dir by Emmanuel Demarcy-Mota - Reims
- 2007 : Three Sisters de Tchekhov, dir Astrid Bas - Théâtre de l'Odéon
- 2007-2009 : La Corde sensible, cowritten with Vincent Ozanon - Théâtre Studio of Alfortville and Cirque Romanès
- 2019 : L'Heureux Stratagème by Pierre de Marivaux, dir by Ladislas Chollat - Théâtre Édouard VII
- 2020 : The Man Who Planted Trees by Jean Giono, lecture - Saint-Germain-de-Modéon

=== Author and director ===
- 2000 : Tes - Tour
- 2003-2004 : Eddy, f. de pute - Théâtre Ouvert (Paris), Bordeaux
- 2005 : Chut ! Libre, cowritten with Juan Cocho
- 2005 : Jiji the Lover - Théâtre de Poche, Geneva
- 2007-2009 : La Corde sensible, cowritten with Vincent Ozanon - Théâtre Studio of Alfortville and Cirque Romanès
- 2019 : Le Lait de Marie - Saint-Germain-de-Modéon

== Awards ==
- 2017 : Festival des créations télévisuelles de Luchon : Best actor for Le Mari de mon mari
- 2019 : Académie Alphonse Allais : Prix Jules Renard for Le Lait de Marie

== Bibliography ==
- 2000 : Tes, Éditions Solitiaires intempestifs
- 2000 : Psychanalyse d’un vampire, written for France Culture
- 2001 : Eddy, f. de pute, Éditions Théâtre Ouvert Tapuscrit
- 2003 : Civilisation de monstres
- 2004 : Jiji the Lover, edited by Le Poche (Geneva), "Les inédits du poche"
- 2010 : Jean la vengeance
