= Nicolas Le Floch (TV series) =

French television crime drama

- Genre: Drama; Thriller
- Created by: Hugues Pagan
- Country of origin: France
- Original language: French
- No. of seasons: 6 seasons
- No. of episodes: 12 (2 episodes per season)

Production
- Production location: France
- Running time: 90 minutes

Original release
- Network: France 2
- Release: October 28, 2008 – November 2, 2018

Nicolas Le Floch is a French television crime drama that was first shown on France 2 on October 28, 2008. The series was created by Hugues Pagan. Each season contains 2 episodes for a total, by 2015, of 12 episodes.

The series is adapted from Jean-François Parot's novels Les Enquêtes de Nicolas Le Floch, commissaire au Châtelet.

The series is broadcast in the United States, Japan, Russia, Latin America, Europe and Africa.

== Plot ==
Nicolas Le Floch is Commissaire of the Châtelet in 18th century Paris. Working for the Lieutenant General of Police Antoine de Sartine, and assisted by Inspector Pierre Bourdeau and others, he solves crimes at all levels of Parisian society — including the royal court — while pursuing a complicated love life.

== Main characters ==
- Jérôme Robart : Nicolas Le Floch, Marquis de Ranreuil, Commissaire of the Châtelet (1–6)
- Mathias Mlekuz : Inspector Pierre Bourdeau (1–6)
- Norah Lehembre : Aimée of Arranet (5)
- Vimala Pons (1–2) and Camille de Pazzis (3) : Marie de Langremont / La Satin / La Bichelière
- François Caron : Antoine de Sartine, Lieutenant General of Police of Paris (1–4) and Minister of the Navy (5)
- Vincent Winterhalter : Doctor Guillaume Scemacgus, former naval surgeon (1–5)
- Michaël Abiteboul : Charles-Henri Sanson, executioner of Châtelet (1–5)
- Jean-Marie Winling : M. de Noblecourt, former prosecutor (1–5)
- Marie Verdi : Catherine, cook of M. de Noblecourt (1–5)
- Sava Lolov : Count de La Borde, first servant of the king's bedchamber (1–5)
- Claire Nebout : madame of Le Dauphin Couronné (1–5)
- Yves Lambrecht : Count of Arranet, Aimée's father (5)
- Pierre Banderet (1) and Jacques Frantz (5) : Monsieur de Saint-Florentin, minister of the king
- Pierre Remund : Louis XV (1–5)
- Louis Barraud : Louis XVI (5)
- Jules Sadoughi : child of Paris (1–3)
- Tom Novembre : Count of St. Germain (3–4)
- Nathalie Roussel : Queen Marie Leszczyńska (3–4)
- Thomas Chabrol : Le Noir (3–5)

=== Guest ===
- Carole Franck as Madame de Pompadour (Season 1, Ep. 1)
- Alexis Michalik as Lambert / Yves de Langremont (Season 1, Ep. 1)
- Jean-Paul Comart as Morande (Season 2, Ep. 2)
- Émilie Gavois-Kahn as La Duvernois (Season 3, Ep. 1)
- Étienne Chicot as The Count of Rhodes (Season 3, Ep. 2)
- Marianne Denicourt as Belle Aglae (Season 5, Ep. 1)
- Damien Bonnard as The barker (Season 5, Ep. 2)
- Agnès Soral as Dame Cahuet de Villiers (Season 6, Ep. 1)
- Nicolas Vaude as Baldo (Season 6, Ep. 2)

== Season 1 (2008) ==
- Episode 1 : L'Homme au ventre de plomb - The Man with the Lead Stomach
- Episode 2 : L'Énigme des Blancs-Manteaux - The Blancs-Manteaux Enigma

== Season 2 (2009) ==
- Episode 3 : Le Fantôme de la Rue Royale - The Phantom of the Rue Royale
- Episode 4 : L’Affaire Nicolas Le Floch - The Nicolas Le Floch Affair

== Season 3 (2010) ==
The episodes are original stories written by Hugues Pagan.

- Episode 5 : La Larme de Varsovie - The Tear of Warsaw
- Episode 6 : Le Grand Veneur - The Grand Huntsman

== Season 4 (2011) ==
The episodes are original stories written by Hugues Pagan.

- Episode 7 : Le Dîner de Gueux - The Rogue's Banquet
- Episode 8 : Le Crime de la rue des Francs-Bourgeois - The Rue des Francs-Bourgeois Case

== Season 5 (2013) ==
- Episode 9 : Le Crime de l’hôtel Saint-Florentin - Murder at the Hotel Saint-Florentin
- Episode 10 : Le Sang des farines - Blood in the Flour

== Season 6 (2017-2018) ==
- Episode 11 : Le Cadavre anglais
- Episode 12 : Le Noyé du Grand canal

== Awards ==
- Festival de la fiction TV de La Rochelle 2008 : Best music
- Festival du film de télévision de Luchon 2013 : People's choice
