= Gambin =

Gambin is an English surname. Notable people with the surname include:

- Luke Gambin (born 1993), English footballer
- Ryan Gambin (born 1985), Australian swimmer
- Sherry Gambin-Walsh (fl. 2015), Canadian politician

== See also ==
- Gambino
