= Geneviève Meurgues =

French explorer (1931–2021)

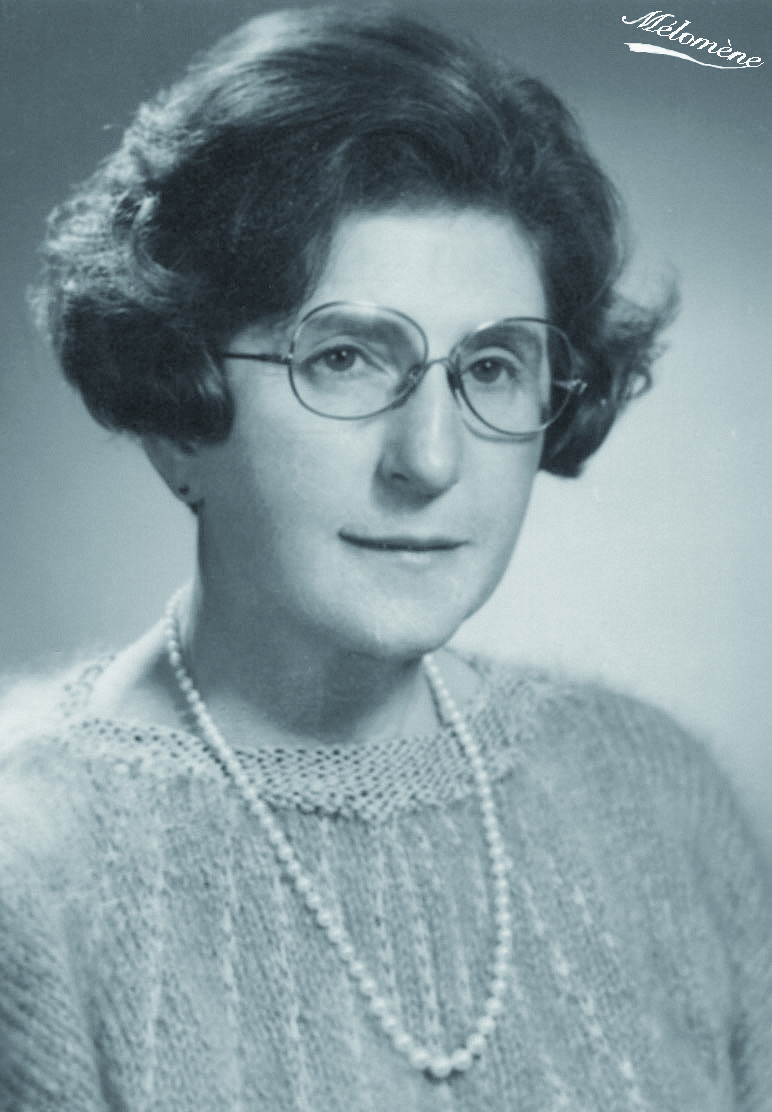
- Born: 4 February 1931; Paris, France
- Died: 21 December 2021 (aged 90); Semur-en-Auxois, France
- Education: Conservatoire national des arts et métiers

Geneviève Meurgues (4 February 1931 - 21 December 2021) was a French explorer, museologist, curator, conservator, chemical engineer and lecturer. As a professor at the Muséum national d'histoire naturelle, she specialised in the conservation of natural history specimens. She is noted for the preservation of the Roman boat found in Marseille and for her contribution to the establishment of the grande galerie de l'évolution du Muséum national d'histoire naturelle in Paris.

== Early life ==
Geneviève Meurgues was born on 4 February 1931 in Paris, into a family originally from Saint-Germain-de-Modéon. She had sister and brother, Christiane and Bernard. Until 1962, she worked in a medical analysis laboratory while completing her education in chemistry and biochemistry at the Conservatoire national des arts et métiers. She graduated as a chemical engineer in 1967, writing her thesis on the nucleic acids of the fungus Aspergillus niger.

== Career ==
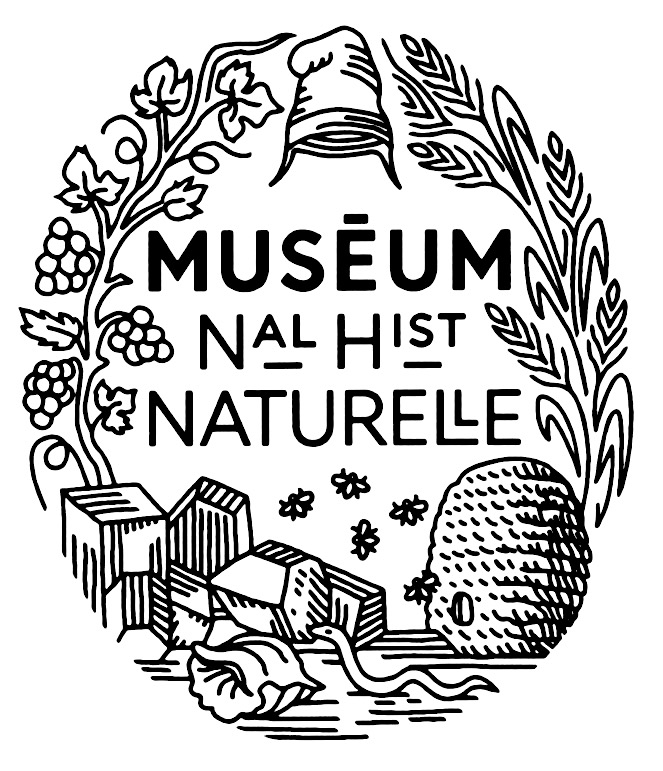
Muséum national d'histoire naturelle logo used since 1793

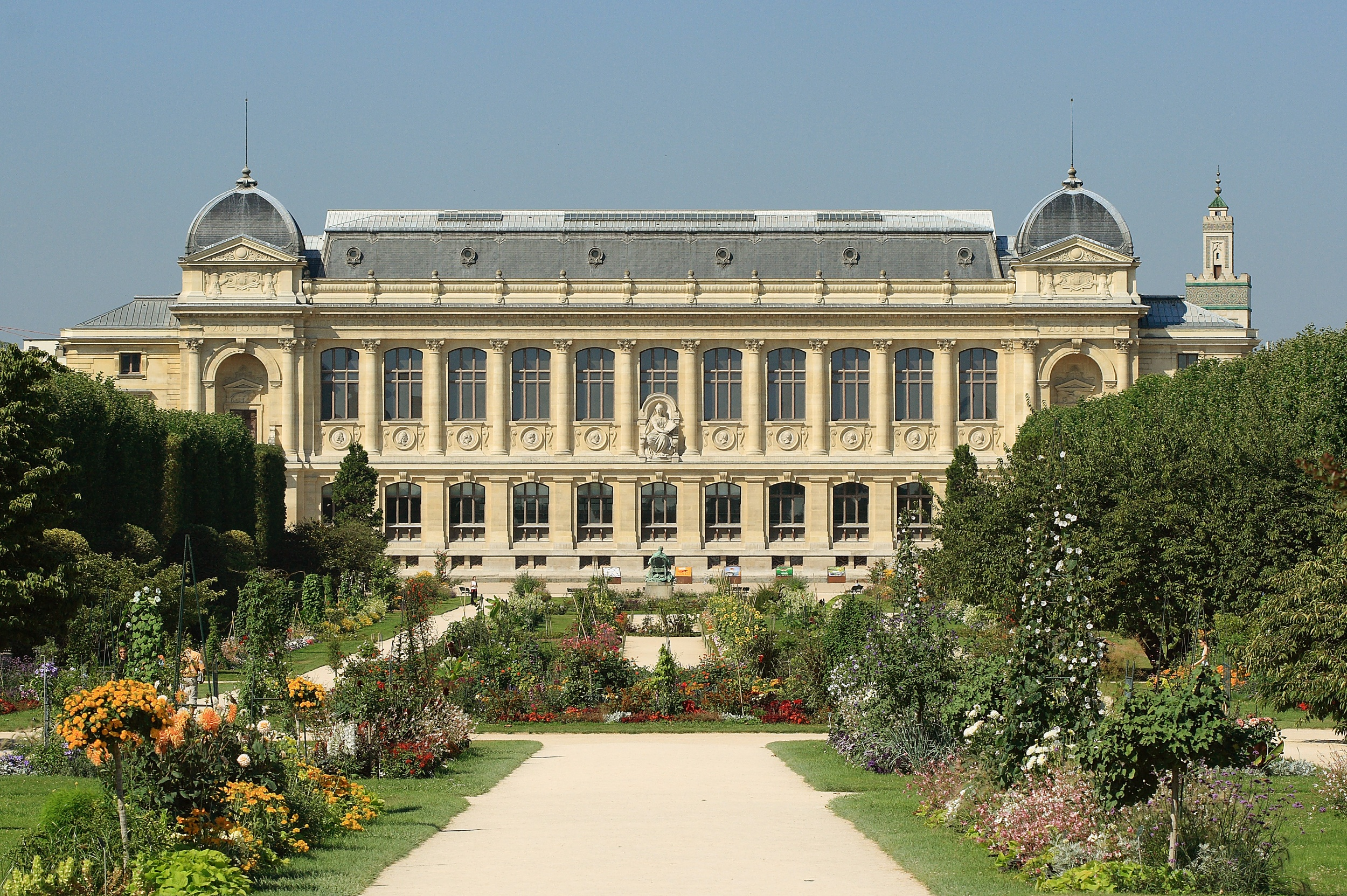
Grande Galerie de l'Evolution

In 1962, Meurgues' work came to the attention of the botanist Roger Heim. He tasked her with setting up a scientific laboratory in the Muséum national d'histoire naturelle, dedicated to new methods of conservation and presentation of natural history museum collections. This included conservation techniques such as freeze-drying, and resinous injections, the scientific preservation of colours and pigments, as well as improving the interpretation of exhibitions and displays. She organised and directed the laboratory whilst studying for a Diplôme d'études approfondies (Master's degree) in zoology on Calliphoridae, (types of flies) which she completed in 1973.

She was promoted to become the museum's assistant professor, and went on collecting expeditions to Kurdistan, Afghanistan, Kashmir, China, Morocco amongst others.

Meurgues organised a number temporary exhibitions including: Les pigments végétaux (Vegetable Pigments) in 1963, Orchidées et plantes épiphytes (Orchids and epiphytic plants) in 1966, Météorites, messagères du cosmos (Meteorites, messengers of the cosmos) in 1968, La Nature au microscope électronique (Nature under an electron microscope) in 1971, Le Sahara avant le désert (The Sahara before the desert) in 1974, Les plus beaux coquillages du monde (The most beautiful shells of the world) in 1975, Histoire naturelle de la sexualité (Natural history of sexuality) in 1977 with André Langaney, a leading French science communicator.

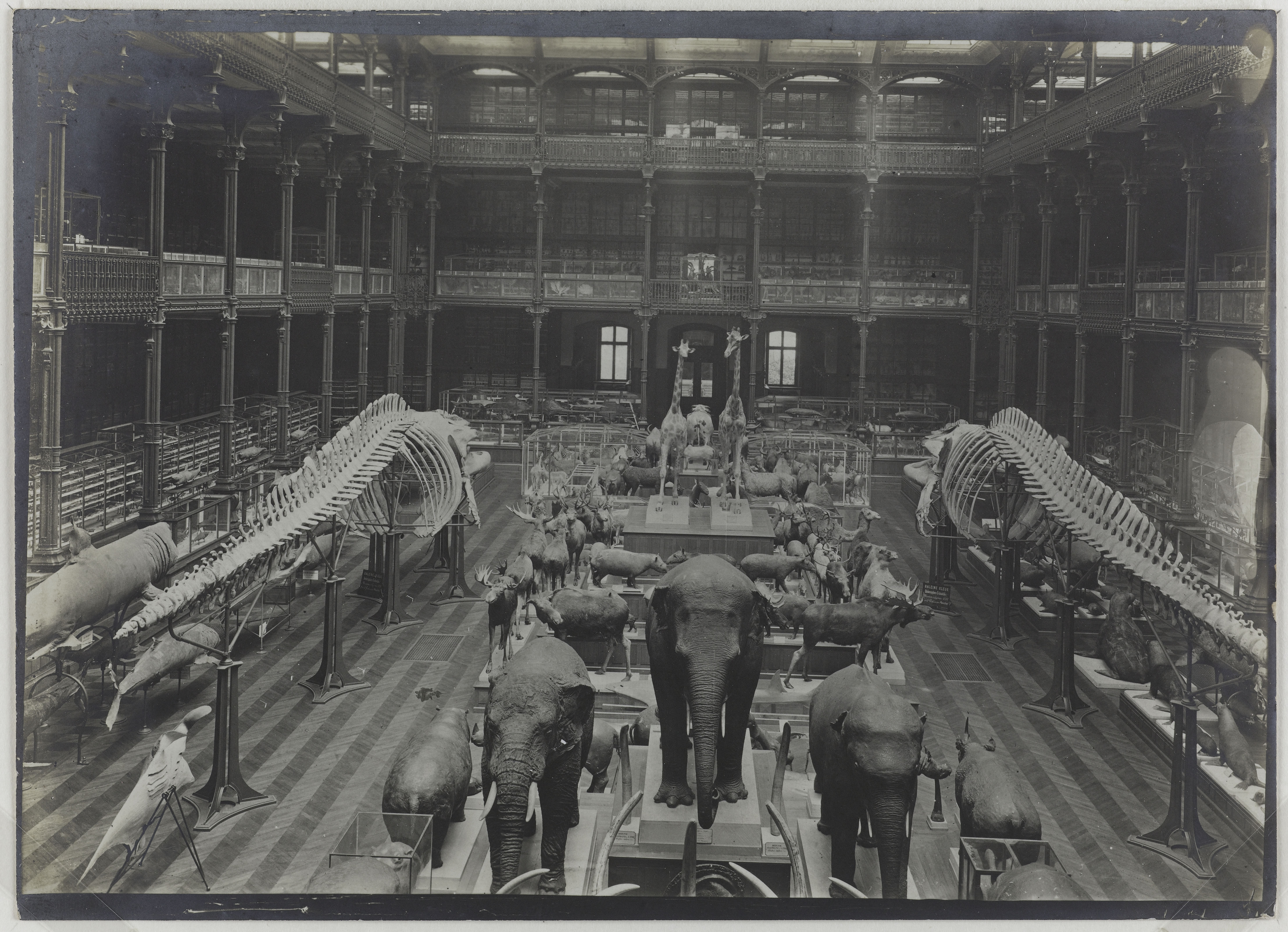
Interior of grande galerie de l'Evolution before Mergues' redevelopment

She delivered the exhibition Claude Bernard naturaliste (Claude Bernard, naturalist) in 1978, La bionique, science des inventions de la nature (Bionics, science of inventions of nature) in 1985, La géonomie, science de l'homme dans la nature en 1986, and le Bicentenaire de Buffon (the Bicentennial of Buffon) in 1988.

From 1986, she was responsible for a series of temporary exhibitions including Parfums de plantes (Perfumes of plants), a collaboration between the museum and perfume and aromatics industry companies.

At the same time, she wrote the synopsis for the Esquisse d'une planète habitée (Sketch of an Inhabited Planet) about genomics by Maxence Revault d'Allonnes and Jean-Pierre Gasc, and worked on the creation of the Musée des Sciences de la Terre (Museum of Earth Sciences) in Rabat, Morocco in collaboration with paleontologist Philippe Taquet.

Around 1980, Geneviève Meurgues conserved the hull of the Roman boat found under the construction site of the Stock Exchange shopping center in Marseille, using freeze-drying and resinous injection techniques. The conserved boat is on display at the Marseille History Museum.

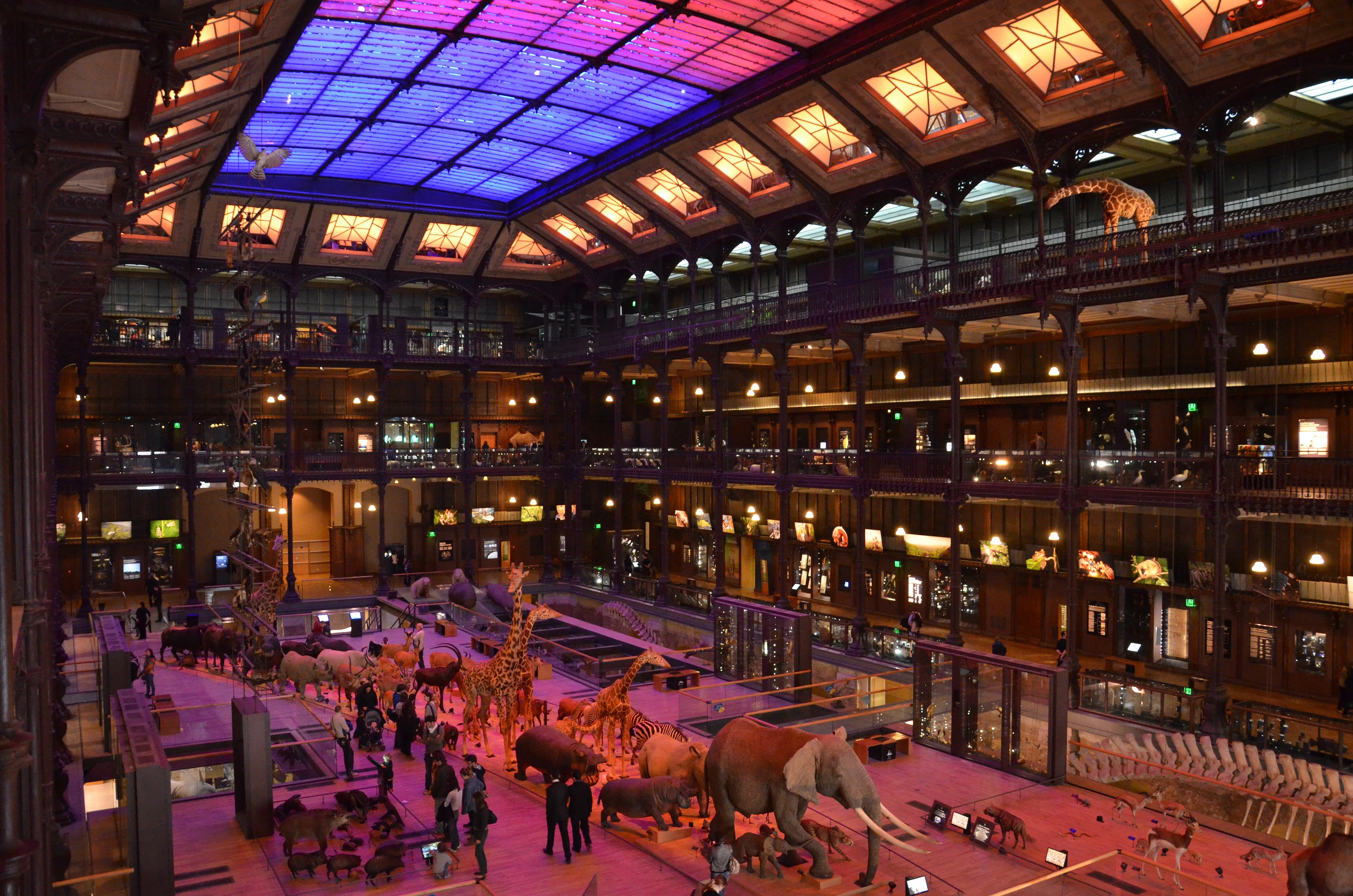
The "grande galerie de l'Évolution" after its renovation

In 1985 she was awarded the Prix Jean-Perrin for her work to popularise science.

From 1988, she devoted herself to the development of grande galerie de l'évolution du Muséum national d'histoire naturelle at the National Museum of Natural History. She worked on the choice of specimens, the interpretation and writing of scientific texts and the synopses and screen plays for documentary films, as well as designing games for the gallery. Meurgues was promoted to professor of the Museum in 1992. The grande galerie de l'évolution was opened on 21 June 1994, the day of the summer solstice, by President François Mitterrand. Meurgues escorted him through the gallery.

Geneviève Meurgues worked as the deputy director of the Grande Galerie de l'Évolution until her retirement in 1998.

== Retirement ==
Meurgues retired to Saint-Germain-de-Modéon, continuing to write articles in specialist magazines, sharing her knowledge in museology and scriptwriting, as well as restoring the family farm and creating an animal rescue refuge. She donated her scientific library to the Muséum d'Autun and is preparing a book Inventions et bricolages de la nature. She published Du jardin de Buffon à l'Afghanistan: mémoires d'une naturaliste in 2019.

Geneviève Meurgues died on 21 December 2021, in her 91st year. According to her last wishes, her cremation was private and her ashes will be spread in the "Les Grands Bouchons" wood, where her vocation as a naturalist was born.

== Awards ==
- Prix scientifique de la Fondation de France, with André Langaney, 1978
- Prix de la Société française de physique, 1985
- Le Relictocarabus meurguesianus, and insect discovered in Morocco, was named in her honour.

== Publications ==
- G. Meurgues et G. Ledoux, Intérêt de l'étude du sac interne dévaginé et en extension. Annales de la Société entomologique de France (N. S.), 2: 661–669.
- Influence de la composition minérale du milieu de culture sur la biosynthèse des Acides Nucléiques d'Aspergillus niger, thèse, Conservatoire National des Arts et Métiers 1967.
- La conservation des spécimens d'histoire naturelle, in: Museum International, Volume 38–2, 12 janvier 1986 p. 92–97.
- Parfums de Plantes, préface de Philippe Taquet, éd. du Muséum national d'histoire naturelle, 1987. ISBN 2-85653-156-3.
- Un exemple de collaboration entre un musée et l’industrie pour l’exposition Parfums de plantes au Muséum national d’Histoire naturelle, in: Culture scientifique et Technique de l’Entreprise, 1994, p. 229-232.
- De la galerie de Zoologie à la grande Galerie de l'Évolution, in: La conservation - une science en évolution: bilan et perspectives, Actes des troisièmes journées internationales d'études de l'ARSAG, Paris 21-25 avril 1997 p. 57-62.
- Du jardin de Buffon à l'Afghanistan: mémoires d'une naturaliste, L'Harmattan 2019, ISBN 2343185441

== Notes and references ==
=== Sources ===
- Philippe Jaussaud; Édouard-Raoul Brygoo (2004). Du Jardin au Muséum. Archives (in French). Paris: Muséum national d'histoire naturelle. p. 630. ISBN 978-2-85653-565-3.
- Annuaire et sites du Muséum national d'histoire naturelle, 40 p., MNHN, Paris, rééditions décennales.
- Ghislaine Prévos, Service documentation du Département des Galeries du Muséum national d'histoire naturelle, annuaire biographique du personnel.
