= Gambini =

Gambini is an Italian surname. Notable people with the surname include:

- Pierre Gambini, French songwriter and composer
- Rodolfo Gambini (born 1946), Uruguayan physicist
- Rodolfo Gambini (painter) (1855–1928), Italian painter

== See also ==
- Pier Antonio Quarantotti Gambini (1910–1965), Italian writer and journalist
- The Great Gambini, a 1937 American film
- Gambino
