= Jean-François Parot =

French diplomat and writer (1946–2018)

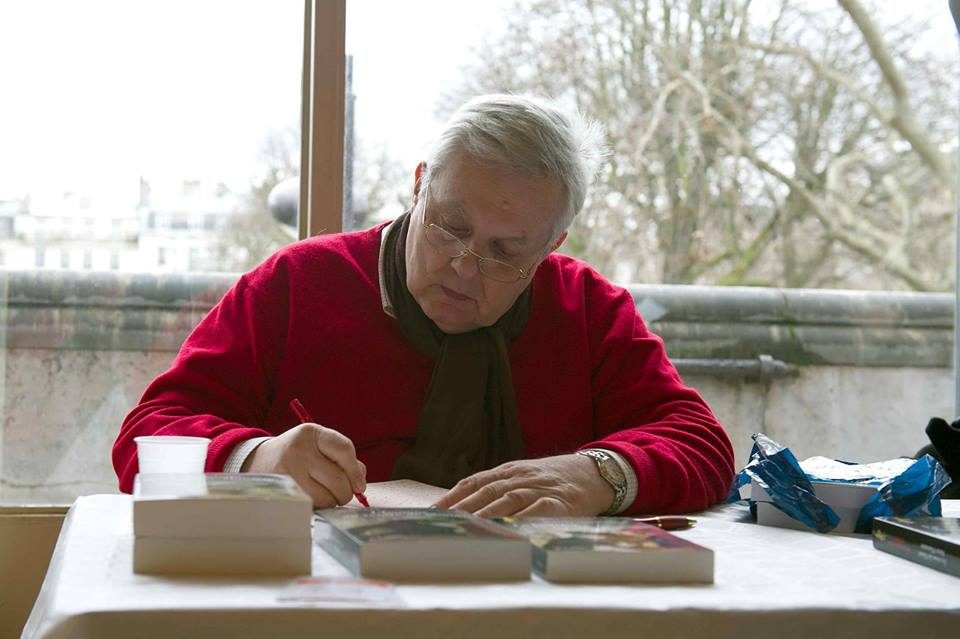
Jean-François Parot

Jean-François Parot (27 June 1946 Paris – 23 May 2018 Missillac) was a French diplomat and author of historical mysteries, known for his Nicolas Le Floch series.

== Background and professional career ==
Coming from a family closely connected with the cinema (as a child, he knew Jean Gabin, his mother worked for Marcel Carné and his grandfather was the editor of Abel Gance's Napoléon), Parot got a BA and an MA in history and completed postgraduate studies in anthropology, specializing in Egyptian mummification techniques, the myths of the Pacific Islanders and the social history of 18th-century Paris. He wrote the study Structures sociales des quartiers de Grève, Saint-Avoye et Saint-Antoine, 1780–1785 (published on microfiche by Hachette, 1974).

Following his military service, he worked in Saint-Louis, Senegal and was launched into diplomacy "by chance" on the advice of the consul general to whom he had been assigned. He was vice-consul in Kinshasa (1974); Consul General of France in Ho Chi Minh City (1982–87) and in Athens; embassy counselor in Doha, Khartoum, Djibouti, Ouagadougou and Sofia; Minister Counselor at Tunis and deputy to the French ambassador; also advisor to the Minister of Industry and deputy director of personnel in the Ministry of Foreign Affairs in Nantes. Between 2002 and 2006, he was deputy director of the Directorate of Military Cooperation and Defense. He became Ambassador in Guinea-Bissau in October 2006. As ambassador, he emphasised the role of food in diplomacy.

== Writing ==
Parot is best known as the author of the Nicolas Le Floch crime series. Parot conceived the idea of his eighteenth-century police Commissaire when stationed in Sofia. The characteristic feature of his novels is the accuracy of the historical Parisian background that is blended with action and mystery.

His books are published by Éditions Jean-Claude Lattès in Paris and in the Grands détectives series by Éditions 10/18. Most have also been published by Éditions France loisirs and le Grand livre du mois. His works have been translated into Italian, Spanish, English, Japanese and Russian. They are the subject of a television adaptation on France 2 by former police inspector Hugues Pagan with Jérôme Robart in the title role.

== Fictional character ==
Nicolas Le Floch was born in Guérande, Brittany, the illegitimate son of the Marquis de Ranreuil, raised by Canon Le Floch. When the cycle of novels begins in 1761, he is working with the (real-life) Antoine de Sartine, Lieutenant General of Police of Paris, and promoted to Commissaire of le Châtelet. Assisted by Inspector Pierre Bourdeau and others he goes on to solve crimes as well as pursue a complicated love life. He and many of his friends are gourmets and descriptions of food feature prominently in the novels.

== Works ==
Les enquêtes de Nicolas Le Floch, commissaire au Châtelet (Listed here are the first French editions (Éd. J.-C. Lattès, Paris) and the first English editions (Gallic Books, London)

1. L'Énigme des Blancs-Manteaux, 2000, ISBN 2-7096-2037-5. – The Châtelet Apprentice, 2007, ISBN 978-1-906040-06-2.
2. L'Homme au ventre de plomb, 2000, ISBN 2-7096-2038-3. – The Man with the Lead Stomach, 2008, ISBN 978-1-906040-07-9.
3. Le Fantôme de la rue Royale, 2001, ISBN 2-7096-2284-X. – The Phantom of the Rue Royale, tr. Howard Curtis, Gallic Books, 2008, ISBN 978-1-906040-11-6.
4. L'Affaire Nicolas Le Floch, 2002, ISBN 2-7096-2350-1. – The Nicolas Le Floch Affair, tr. Howard Curtis, Gallic Books, 2009, ISBN 1906040222.
5. Le Crime de l'hôtel Saint-Florentin, 2004, ISBN 2-7096-2514-8. – The Saint-Florentin Murders, tr. Howard Curtis, Gallic Books, 2010, ISBN 978-1-906040-24-6.
6. Le Sang des farines, 2005, ISBN 2-7096-2674-8. – The Baker's Blood, tr. Howard Curtis, Gallic Books, 2012, ISBN 978-1-906040-36-9.
7. Le Cadavre anglais, 2007, ISBN 978-2-7096-2867-9.
8. Le Noyé du grand canal, 2009, ISBN 978-2-7096-3036-8.
9. L'Honneur de Sartine, 2010, ISBN 978-2-7096-3426-7.
10. L'Enquête russe, 2012, ISBN 978-2-7096-3694-0.
11. L'Année du volcan, 2013, ISBN 978-2-7096-4232-3.
12. La Pyramide de glace, 2014, ISBN 978-2-7096-4616-1.
13. L'Inconnu du pont Notre-Dame, 2015, ISBN 978-2-7096-5035-9.
14. Le Prince de Cochinchine, 2017 ISBN 978-2-7096-5845-4.
