= Eurochannel =

International television channel

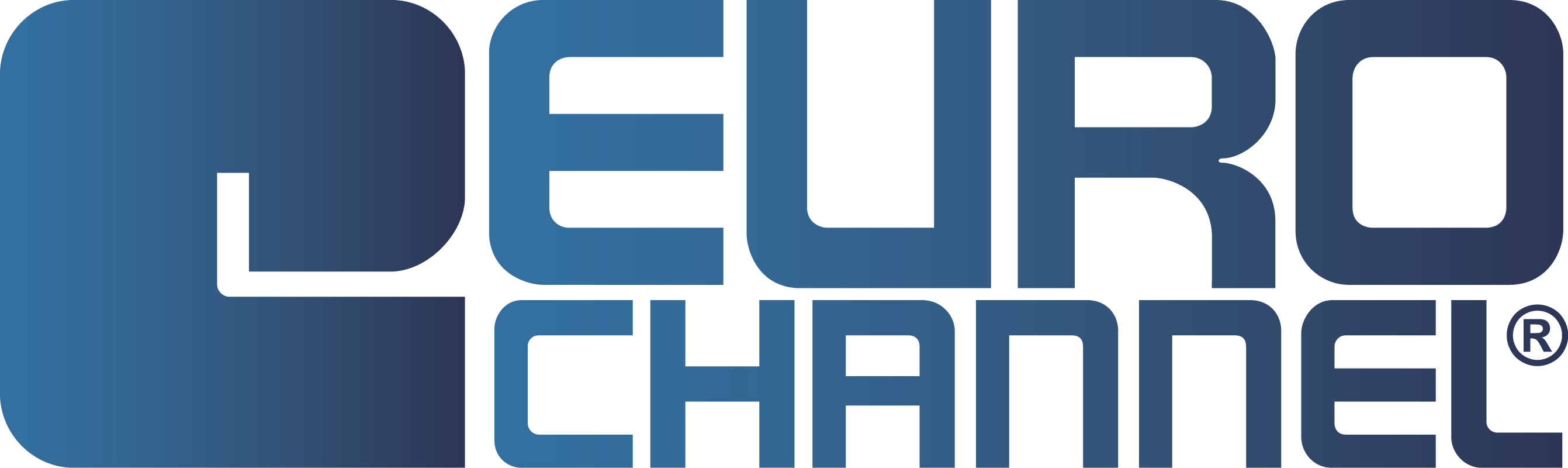
- Country: France
- Broadcast area: Internationally
- Headquarters: Miami; Paris; São Paulo; Buenos Aires

Ownership
- Owner: Eurochannel Group

History
- Launched: 1994

Links
- Website: www.eurochannel.com

Availability

Streaming media
- Sling TV: Internet Protocol television

Eurochannel is a world television channel focused on European culture and lifestyle through movies, series and other programs dedicated to European culture. Eurochannel broadcasts in original audio with subtitles in English, French, German, Italian, Spanish and Portuguese.

Eurochannel is available in Hispanic America, France, Brazil, United States, Canada, the Caribbean, Angola, Mozambique, Portugal and North Macedonia, reaching more than 25 million people in 24 countries through 11 million households.

In the United States, Eurochannel is available on Google Play on all Android devices.

== History ==
Eurochannel was originally created by Televisão Abril (TVA) in Brazil in 1994, then released by DirecTV in that country. In November 2000, the channel was acquired by Multithematiques Inc, the short-lived American subsidiary of the French company of the same name, from Abril, for the sum of $8 million. Its CEO Michel Thoulouze had high hopes following the buying, in an attempt to "reawaken taste" for European content and culture. Under new ownership, Eurochannel expanded to Spanish-speaking countries of Latin America on 1 February 2002, with a soft launch in Mexico a few days earlier on 21 January.

Eurochannel launched on Sky Brasil on 1 February 2003. At that time, Eurochannel carried an exclusive feed for Brazil coming from Miami and had local programs produced from São Paulo.

In 2004, Gustavo Vainstein, former executive at Noos, a French cable operator, took control of the channel. Since 2004, the channel develops its programming content and also creates its own events such as the Eurochannel Tour of Short Films. While being available in Latin America and the US, the company starts expanding its coverage worldwide and in April 2013 picks Eutelsat 16A to extend its reach in sub-Saharian Africa.

In 2015, the channel continues its expansion in different regions, including availability in countries like South Korea, (Note: The channel was launched on 17 July 2015.) India and South Africa.

== Current programming ==
Eurochannel's programming includes mostly cinema, television series and music programs.

=== Cinema ===
- Claude Chabrol tribute (France)
- Skirt Day (France)
- A Crime in Paradise (France)
- March of Millions (Germany)
- Il mistero di Oberwald (Italy)

=== Series ===
- 10 (Switzerland)
- Prime Minister (Poland)
- KDD – Berlin Crime Squad (Germany)
- David Nolande (France)
- Looking Back (Italy)

=== Music ===
- Europe (Sweden)
- The Baseballs (Germany)
- Aitana (Spain)
- Muse (UK)
- Depeche Mode (UK)
- Coldplay (UK)
