= Gambino =

Gambino is an Italian surname. Notable persons with that surname include:

== Surname ==
- Agostino Gambino (1933–2021), Italian jurist and politician
- Alberico Gambino (born 1967), Italian politician
- Alberto Gambino (1899–1987), Argentine conductor
- Antonella Gambino (born 1990), Argentine handball player
- Domenico Gambino (1890–1968), Italian actor, screenwriter, and film director
- Giuseppe Gambino (born 1968), Swiss football defender
- Lu Gambino (1923–2003), American football player
- Mike Gambino (born 1977), college baseball coach
- Raffaello Gambino (1928–1989), Italian water polo player
- Richard Gambino (1939–2024), American author and educator
- Richard J. Gambino (1935–2014), American material scientist
- Roberto Gambino (born 1962), Italian architect and politician
- Salvatore Gambino (born 1983), Italian-German football player
- Some members of the Gambino crime family, including:
  - Carlo Gambino (1902–1976), New York mobster and former boss of the crime family
  - Emanuel Gambino, New York mobster and nephew of Carlo Gambino
  - Giuseppe Giacomo Gambino (1941–1996), member of the Mafia and head of the San Lorenzo mandamento
  - John Gambino (1940–2017), Sicilian mobster who operated in New Jersey
  - Rosario Gambino (born 1942), Sicilian mobster imprisoned on drug charges
  - Thomas Gambino (1929–2023), son of Carlo Gambino and caporegime in the Gambino crime family

== Other uses ==
- Childish Gambino, the former stage name of Donald Glover (born 1983)
- Gambino Family (group), an American hip hop group
- Stunna Gambino, stage name of American rapper Isaias Elijah Garcia (born 2001)

== See also ==
- Gambito
- Gambini
