= Jean-Philippe Ricci =

French actor

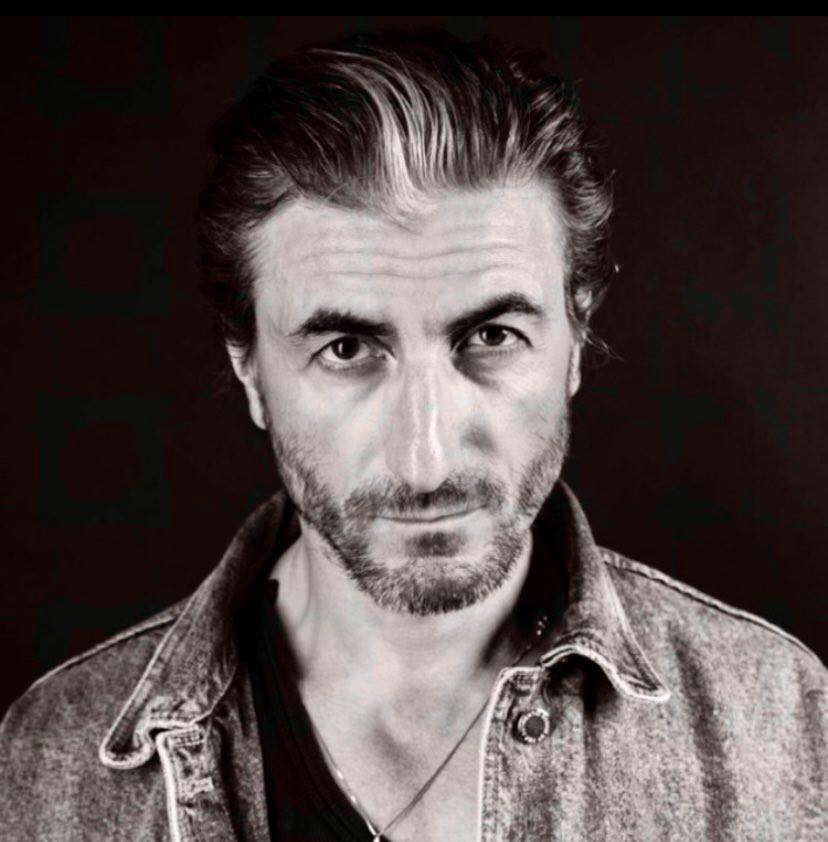
- Jean-Philippe Ricci (2020)
- Occupation: Actor
- Years active: 2001–present

Jean-Philippe Ricci is a French actor.

== Career ==
After studying acting in Marseille, Jean-Philippe Ricci is directed by Philippe Harel and Jacques Audiard. He played the role of Vetturi in A Prophet in 2009 with Niels Arestrup and Tahar Rahim.

On television, he was the commissaire Damiani in Mafiosa (TV series) and Yvan Colonna in Pierre Schoeller's Les Anonymes about the assassination of Claude Érignac.

== Filmography ==
=== Film ===
- 2001: Chanson entre deux by Anna Novion, short
- 2008: Les Randonneurs à Saint-Tropez by Philippe Harel
- 2009: Dogfight by Antoine Elizabé, short
- 2009: A Prophet by Jacques Audiard : Vettori
- 2010: Les Princes de la nuit by Patrick Levy : Tex
- 2011: Requista by Julien Izard : Riton Panucci, short
- 2012: Mauvaise posture by David Mabille : Simon, short
- 2013: Suis-je le gardien de mon frère? by Frédéric Farrucci : Joseph, short
- 2013: Suzanne Dadas by Clémentine Delbecq : Moune, short
- 2013: Migraines by Hélène Couturier : Joseph, short
- 2014: Rien à faire by Julien Izard
- 2015: Entre amis by Olivier Barroux
- 2015: Les Exilés by Rinatu Frassati, short
- 2018: Abdel et la Comtesse by Isabelle Doval : Vincent
- 2018: Béatrice by Rinatu Frassati, short
- 2019: Salauds de pauvres, collectif
- 2019: Aiò Zitelli ! by Jean-Marie Antonini, short : Julien
- 2019: Naufrages by Dominique Lienhard
- 2019: Inséparables by Varante Soudjian : Serge Ferroni
- 2020: Belle Fille by Méliane Marcaggi

=== Television ===
- 2009: Le Débarcadère des anges by Brigitte Roüan: Père Corbucci
- 2010–2014: Mafiosa (TV series), seasons 3 to 5: Commissaire Alain Damiani
- 2013: Les Anonymes - Ùn' pienghjite micca by Pierre Schoeller: Yvan Colonna
- 2013: Crossing Lines: Philippe
- 2014: Disparus by Thierry Binisti
- 2015: Hard, season 3
- 2016: Bois d'ébène by Moussa Touré
- 2017: Tensions au Cap Corse by Stéphanie Murat
- 2017: Alex Hugo : Les Amants du levant by Olivier Langlois
- 2017: Quadras, by Mélissa Drigeard et Vincent Juillet : Julien
- 2019: Le Temps est assassin by Claude-Michel Rome : Éric Rocca
- 2019: Meurtres en Cotentin by Jérémy Minui : Étienne Letourneau
- 2020: La Garçonne by Paolo Barzman : Alberti
- 2022: Peaky Blinders : Fishing Boat Captain
- 2022: Marianne: Laszlo Pedri
- 2022: Candice Renoir: Lieutenant-Colonel Bartoli

=== Web serie ===
- 2009: Le Train corse

=== Clip ===
- 2009: Le Turc de Savants des Rimes

=== Video Games ===
- 2025: Kingdom Come: Deliverance II : Vauqelin Braban

== Theatre ==
- En attendant le train, dir by Karine Nuris - Théâtre Montmartre-Galabru
- Zig et More from Marine Auriol - Théâtre-Studio of Alfortville
- 2000: Blasted from Sarah Kane, dir by Christian Benedetti - Théâtre-Studio of Alfortville, Théâtre Nanterre-Amandiers: Le soldat
- 2015-2016: Marie Tudor by Victor Hugo, dir by Philippe Calvario - Théâtre Pépinière Opéra, tour
- 2017: Ulysse sans terre, dir by Orlando Furioso - Théâtre de Bastia: Ulysse
- 2020: Intra Muros dir by Alexis Michalik, Théâtre de la Pépinière
