= Charlie Says (2006 film) =

- Film poster
- Directed by: Nicole Garcia
- Written by: Frédéric Bélier-Garcia; Jacques Fieschi; Nicole Garcia
- Produced by: Alain Attal
- Starring: Jean-Pierre Bacri
- Cinematography: Stéphane Fontaine
- Edited by: Emmanuelle Castro
- Music by: Amélie de Chassey; Delphine Mathieu
- Distributed by: Mars Distribution
- Release date: 20 May 2006
- Running time: 140 minutes
- Country: France
- Language: French
- Budget: $7.8 million
- Box office: $8.8 million

Charlie Says (French: Selon Charlie) is a 2006 French drama film, the fifth feature to be directed by Nicola Garcia. It was entered into the 2006 Cannes Film Festival.

== Plot ==
At the end of the school day, 11 year-old Charlie is collected by his father Serge, and they go to an isolated house where Serge has an assignation with his mistress. Silently Charlie plays outside with his boomerang. Pierre is a natural sciences teacher in the collège which Charlie attends; he is perturbed by the appearance of Matthieu, an old colleague. Now a famous archeologist, Mattieu is due to give a series of lectures about a pre-historic hunter (named 'Dirk') who suddenly left his tribe. The local mayor Jean-Louis Bertagnat officiates with great ceremony, albeit clumsily. He later finds relaxation with his mistress, a young municipal worker. Meanwhile, Joss, who is out on parole, is preparing a new job. Matthieu offers Pierre a place on his expedition but Pierre hesitates. When school closes, Charlie guides him to the isolated house where Pierre finds his wife with Serge. During this time Joss has messed up his robbery and is desperately trying to rid himself of a stolen television. The mayor has noticed all this from the place on the beach he uses for his trysts where, in mid break up, he'd come to reflect. Making his escape Joss is knocked out by Charlie's boomerang. Finally his witness gets Joss off the hook. Pierre decides to stay with his wife. Charlie manages to reconcile his parents. Jean-Louis ultimately goes back to his young lover.

== Cast ==
- Jean-Pierre Bacri as Jean-Louis Bertagnat
- Vincent Lindon as Serge
- Benoît Magimel as Pierre
- Benoît Poelvoorde as Joss
- Patrick Pineau as Mathieu
- Arnaud Valois as Adrien
- Ferdinand Martin as Charlie, son of Serge
- Minna Haapkylä as Nora
- Sophie Cattani as Séverine
- Philippe Lefebvre as Pierre-Yves
- Philippe Magnan as Ricordi
- Samir Guesmi as Mo
- Jérôme Robart as Ballhaus
- Valérie Benguigui as Charlie's mother
- Grégoire Leprince-Ringuet as Thierry
- Jean-Louis Foulquier as the bar manager

== Production ==
The scriptwriter Frédéric Bélier-Garcia summed up Selon Charlie as a film about "a contemporary idea of destiny... being none other than that which essentially we wish to avoid, but which catches up with us, overtakes us and finishes face to face - a perilous but vital game between what we are fleeing and what incessantly catches up with us". Télérama, noting Nicole Garcia's preference for 'films choraux' (Hyperlink cinema), where characters criss-cross, whom she views with undeniable tenderness, and through which she underlines the difficulty in communication between individuals, rather than their potential fraternity. The Le Monde reviewer saw the starting point as "a film about men and their weaknesses, never more evident than in their relationships with the opposite sex, and on which the director takes a view that is both cruel and tender". He added that the driving force which propels the universe of these men results in flight, and in the course of these crossing lines the men display "unbridled ambition, lying, infidelity, spinelessness, professional or psychological suicide". The reviewer for Abus de ciné lauded "A magnificent film where each person must make their choices" and where "From secrets to subtext, [Garcia] meticulously weaves a web of mystery around past and present relationships related to their family and professional lives". In making these life choices, "with pain or liberation", the characters aim to finally stop fleeing their circumstances. "Some hope to have a second chance, to succeed where they have always failed, whether in love or professionally. Some prefer solitude to agreed or conventional love".

Selon Charlie is the fifth feature film to be directed by Nicola Garcia.

== Release ==
Selon Charlie was entered into the 2006 Cannes Film Festival.
