= Mafiosa (TV series) =

- Genre: Drama; Thriller
- Created by: Hugues Pagan
- Country of origin: France
- Original language: French
- No. of seasons: 5
- No. of episodes: 40 (8 episodes per season)

Production
- Production location: France
- Cinematography: Patrick Blossier
- Running time: 52 minutes

Original release
- Network: Canal+
- Release: 12 December 2006 – 5 May 2014

Mafiosa, full title Mafiosa, le clan is a French crime drama television series, which premiered on Canal+ on December 6, 2006. The series was created by Hugues Pagan.

The popular series extended for four more seasons added for 2008, 2010, 2012 and 2014. The 2014 series was renamed Mafiosa - L'ultime saison (Mafiosa - the last season). Each season of the series comprised 8 episodes for a total of 40 episodes.

The producer for the series was Nicole Collet with Serge Moati as assistant producer. Various directors for the seasons included Louis Choquette (season 1), Éric Rochant (seasons 2 and 3), Pierre Leccia (seasons 4 and 5).

== Plot ==
By the will of her murdered uncle, the Corsican mafia boss François Paoli, the clan's lawyer, Sandra Paoli (Hélène Fillières), suddenly finds herself the head of the clan. Backed up by her brother, Jean-Michel Paoli, she learns how to assert herself in a very violent world and becomes a respected, but also hated, woman in a world of men, murder and criminality.

According to several media sources, the character Sandra is an adaptation of the current life of the Corsican widow Sandra Casanova-Germani whose brother Jean-Luc Germani is the most wanted man in France. The series contains violence and political schemes.

== Main characters ==
Actor/Actress	Character	Seasons	Notes
Hélène Fillières	Sandra Paoli	Seasons 1 to 5	Jean-Michel's sister, Carmen's aunt, and leader of the mafia
Phareelle Onoyan	Carmen Paoli	Seasons 1 to 5	Sandra's beloved niece and Jean-Michel's daughter.
Thierry Neuvic	Jean-Michel Paoli	Seasons 1 to 4	Sandra's brother and father of Carmen. Killed by Sandra (season 4)
Éric Fraticelli	Antoine "Tony" Campana	Seasons 2 to 5	
Frédéric Graziani	Joseph Emmanuel; Frédéric "Manu"; Mordiconi	Seasons 2 to 4	
Philippe Corticchiato	Joseph Emmanuel; Frédéric "Manu"; Mordiconi	Season 5	Replaced Graziani after his death in March 2013
Jean-Pierre Kalfon	Toussaint Scaglia	Seasons 2 to 5	
Jean-Marc Michelangeli	Paul Bonafedi	Seasons 1 to 5	

== Season 1 (2006-2007) ==
- Director : Louis Choquette
- Producer : Nicole Collet
- Assistant producer : Serge Moati
- Screenwriter : Stéphanie Benson
- Music composer : Cyril Morin
- Episodes broadcast:
  - 1 and 2: 12 December 2006
  - 3 and 4: 19 December 2006
  - 5 and 6: 26 December 2006
  - 7 and 8: 2 January 2007
- Main characters :
  - Hélène Fillières : Sandra Paoli
  - Thierry Neuvic : Jean-Michel Paoli
- Other recurring characters
  - Phareelle Onoyan : Carmen Paoli
  - Fabrizio Rongione : Rémi Andréani
  - Pierre-Marie Mosconi : Mattei
  - Caroline Baehr : Marie-Luce Paoli
  - Guy Cimino : Hyacinthe Leandri Paoli
  - Erick Desmarestz : Président Larcher
  - Patrick Dell'Isola : Commissaire Rocca
  - Marisa Berenson : Caterina Paoli
  - Daniel Duval : François Paoli
  - Claude Faraldo : Ange-Marie Paoli
  - Jo Fondacci : Simon Bianchini
  - Yves Jacques : Mathieu Zamponi
  - Rémi Martin : Martial Santoni
  - Venantino Venantini : Charly «La machine» Scaglia
  - Didier Landucci : Dominique Bianchini
  - Isabelle Tanakil : Maria Léandri
  - Catriona MacColl : DEA correspondent
  - Cédric Appietto : Gino Poletti
  - Marie-Ange Geronimi : amie de Ange-Marie Paoli

== Season 2 (2008) ==
- Director : Éric Rochant
- Producer : Nicole Collet
- Assistant producer : Serge Moati
- Screenwriters : Pierre Leccia and Éric Rochant
- Music composer : Marco Prince
- Episodes broadcast:
  - 1 and 2: 17 November 2008
  - 3 and 4: 24 November 2008
  - 5 and 6: 1 December 2008
  - 7 and 8: 8 December 2008
- Main characters :
  - Hélène Fillières : Sandra Paoli
  - Thierry Neuvic : Jean-Michel Paoli
  - Éric Fraticelli : Antoine "Tony" Campana
  - Frédéric Graziani : Joseph Emmanuel Frédéric "Manu" Mordiconi
- Other recurring characters
  - Phareelle Onoyan : Carmen Paoli
  - Jean-Pierre Kalfon : Toussaint Scaglia
  - Caroline Baehr : Marie-Luce Paoli
  - Fabrizio Rongione : Rémi Andréani
  - Guy Cimino : Hyacinthe Leandri
  - Jean-François Stévenin : Coco Casanova
  - Didier Landucci (new role) : Pierre-Mathieu (Coco's handman)
  - Antoine Basler : Commissaire Rocca
  - Marc Bodnar : Commissaire Keller
  - Jonathan Cohen : Patrick Benmussa
  - JoeyStarr : Moktar
  - Pierre-Laurent Santelli : «Le Dentiste»
  - Marie-Ange Geronimi : Ange-Marie Paoli's friend
  - Michel Ferracci : Ortoli
  - Alice Pol : Aurélie

== Season 3 (2010) ==
- Director : Éric Rochant
- Producer : Nicole Collet
- Assistant producer : Serge Moati
- Screenwriters : Pierre Leccia and Éric Rochant
- Music composer: Pierre Gambini
- Music supervisor : Pascal Mayer
- Episodes broadcast:
  - 1 and 2: 22 November 2010
  - 3 and 4: 29 November 2010
  - 5 and 6: 6 December 2010
  - 7 and 8: 13 December 2010
- Main characters :
  - Hélène Fillières : Sandra Paoli
  - Thierry Neuvic : Jean-Michel Paoli
  - Éric Fraticelli : Antoine "Tony" Campana
  - Frédéric Graziani : Joseph Emmanuel Frédéric "Manu" Mordiconi
- Other recurring characters
  - Phareelle Onoyan : Carmen Paoli
  - JoeyStarr : Moktar
  - Lionel Tavera : Poli
  - Reda Kateb : Nader
  - Michel Ferracci (new role) : André Luciani
  - Daniel Delorme : The mayor
  - Pierre Leccia : Pierre-Mathieu Grimaldi
  - Jean-François Perrone : Jean Santini
  - Helena Noguerra : Laetitia Tavera
  - Abraham Belaga : Mikael Giacomini
  - Véronique Volta : Saudade Canarelli
  - Jean-Philippe Ricci : Commissaire Alain Damiani
  - Denis Braccini : Commissaire Thomas Quilichini
  - Julia Pierrini-Darcourt : Tony's lover
  - Benjamin Garcia Casinelli : Tony's lover's husband

== Season 4 (2012) ==
- Director : Pierre Leccia
- Producer : Nicole Collet
- Assistant producer : Serge Moati
- Music composer: Pierre Gambini
- Music supervisor : Pascal Mayer
- Episodes broadcast:
  - 1 and 2: 19 March 2012
  - 3 and 4: 26 March 2012
  - 5 and 6: 2 April 2012
  - 7 and 8: 9 April 2012
- Main characters :
  - Hélène Fillières : Sandra Paoli
  - Éric Fraticelli : Antoine "Tony" Campana
  - Frédéric Graziani : Joseph Emmanuel Frédéric "Manu" Mordiconi
- Other recurring characters
  - Phareelle Onoyan : Carmen Paoli
  - Jean-Pierre Kalfon : Toussaint Scaglia
  - Lionel Tavera : Poli
  - Jean-François Perrone : Jean Santini
  - Philippe Nahon : Jules Acquaviva
  - Jérôme Robart : Sebastien Acquaviva
  - Renan Carteaux : Son of game house owner
  - Stefano Accorsi : Enzo Manfredi
  - Abraham Belaga : Mikael Giacomini
  - Véronique Volta : Saudade Canarelli
  - Linda Hardy : Livia Tavera
  - Jean-Philippe Ricci : Commissioner Alain Damiani
  - Denis Braccini : Commissioner Thomas Quilichini
  - Anna Mihalcea : Milka
  - Pierrick Tonelli : PJ officer
  - Michel Ferracci : André Luciani
  - Cédric Appietto (new role) : Guy Bastiani
  - Paul Prudenti : Simon Comiti
  - Antò Mela : Ludo Campana
  - Marie Murcia : Marie-Paule Campana
  - Emmanuelle Hauck : Christelle Paoli
  - Paul Garatte : Jean-Luc Feruti

== Season 5 - Mafiosa - L'ultime saison (2014) ==
- Director : Pierre Leccia
- Episodes broadcast:
  - 1 and 2: 14 April 2014
  - 3 and 4: 21 April 2014
  - 5 and 6: 28 April 2014
  - 7 and 8: 5 May 2014
- Main characters :
  - Hélène Fillières : Sandra Paoli
  - Éric Fraticelli : Antoine "Tony" Campana
  - Philippe Corticchiato : Joseph Emmanuel Frédéric "Manu" Mordiconi
- Recurring characters
  - Phareelle Onoyan : Carmen Paoli
  - Bruno Magne : Daniel Colombani
