= Nicolas Le Floch =

- Nicolas Le Floch character
- First appearance: Novels: L'Énigme des Blancs-Manteaux; Television: L’Homme au ventre de plomb (episode 1.01)
- Created by: Jean-François Parot
- Portrayed by: Jérôme Robart

In-universe information
- Occupation: Police investigator
- Family: Marquis de Ranreuil (biological father, deceased); Isabelle de Ranreuil (half-sister); Louis (son)
- Nationality: French

Nicolas Le Floch is a fictional character, the hero of a series of police detective novels written by Jean-François Parot that take place principally in Paris in the 18th century.

== Biography ==
Fictitious coat of arms of Nicolas Le Floch

Nicolas Le Floch was raised in Guérande, Brittany, by Canon Le Floch. He studied with the Jesuits at Vannes, then became a legal clerk in Rennes. When the series of novels begins, in 1761, he is sent to Paris with a letter of recommendation from his godfather, the Marquis de Ranreuil, to Monsieur de Sartine, head of secret affairs for Louis XV, who has just been named the Lieutenant General of Police in Paris. Nicolas puts himself at de Sartine’s service and solves various criminal cases, aided by his second in command, Inspector Pierre Bourdeau. The novels follow his social advancement and his romantic liaisons in the last decades before the French Revolution.

In the first volume, Nicolas learns he is, in fact, the illegitimate son of the Marquis de Ranreuil and, thus, the half-brother of the marquis’ daughter, Isabelle, whom he is in love with.

The king rewards Nicolas for the success of his first investigation with the office of “commissaire” of police at the Châtelet (the monarchy’s seat of common-law justice until the Revolution). Also in this book, Nicolas meets those who will surround and support him in his life in Paris : Aimé de Noblecourt, former procurator and lover of fine food, with whom Nicolas lodges; Doctor Guillaume Semacgus, naval surgeon; Monsieur de La Borde, First Groom of the King’s Bedchamber; Charles-Henri Sanson, Paris hangman and in charge of autopsies; along with the servants and expert cooks Marion and Catherine. Parot mixes fictional characters and historical figures.

At the death of Louis XV, when de Sartine is named State Secretary of the Navy, Nicolas comes under the orders of Monsieur Le Noir.

At the beginning of his time in Paris, before the start of the main action in the series, he had a liaison with a young woman, Antoinette Godelet, who later falls into prostitution under the name of La Satin, and she had a son, Louis, whom he recognizes in the fifth volume. It is also in that book that he meets and falls in love with Aimée d’Arranet, daughter of a Lieutenant General of the Naval Armies.

== Novels ==
Les enquêtes de Nicolas Le Floch, commissaire au Châtelet (Listed here are the first French editions (Éd. J.-C. Lattès, Paris) and the first English editions (Gallic Books, London)

1. L'Énigme des Blancs-Manteaux, 2000, ISBN 2-7096-2037-5. -- The Châtelet Apprentice, 2007, ISBN 978-1-906040-06-2.
2. L'Homme au ventre de plomb, 2000, ISBN 2-7096-2038-3. -- The Man with the Lead Stomach, 2008, ISBN 978-1-906040-07-9.
3. Le Fantôme de la rue Royale, 2001, ISBN 2-7096-2284-X. -- The Phantom of the Rue Royale, 2008, ISBN 978-1-906040-11-6.
4. L'Affaire Nicolas Le Floch, 2002, ISBN 2-7096-2350-1. -- The Nicolas Le Floch Affair, 2009, ISBN 978-1-906040-17-8.
5. Le Crime de l'hôtel Saint-Florentin, 2004, ISBN 2-7096-2514-8. -- The Saint-Florentin Murders, 2010, ISBN 978-1-906040-24-6.
6. Le Sang des farines, 2005, ISBN 2-7096-2674-8. -- The Baker's Blood, 2012, ISBN 978-1-906040-36-9.
7. Le Cadavre anglais, 2007, ISBN 978-2-7096-2867-9.
8. Le Noyé du grand canal, 2009, ISBN 978-2-7096-3036-8.
9. L'Honneur de Sartine, 2010, ISBN 978-2-7096-3426-7.
10. L'enquête russe, 2012, ISBN 978-2-7096-3694-0.
11. L'Année du volcan, 2013, ISBN 978-2-7096-4232-3.
12. La Pyramide de glace, 2014, ISBN 978-2-7096-4616-1.
13. L'Inconnu du pont Notre-Dame, 2015, ISBN 978-2-7096-5035-9.
14. Le Prince de Cochinchine, 2017, ISBN 978-2-7096-5845-4.

== Television adaptations ==
=== Episodes ===
Nicolas Le Floch, the adventures of Jean-François Parot’s hero are the subject of a television series broadcast on the French channel France 2. Nicolas Le Floch is played by Jérôme Robart. For historical authenticity, episodes have been filmed in Paris, Le Mans, Île-de-France and the Dordogne.

The episodes 5, 6, 7, 8 are original stories written by Hugues Pagan.

- Episode 1 : L'Homme au ventre de plomb (2008)
- Episode 2 : L'Énigme des Blancs-Manteaux (2008)
- Episode 3 : Le Fantôme de la Rue Royale (2009)
- Episode 4 : L’Affaire Nicolas Le Floch (2009)
- Episode 5 : La Larme de Varsovie (2010)
- Episode 6 : Le Grand Veneur (2010)
- Episode 7 : Le Dîner de Gueux (2011)
- Episode 8 : Le Crime de la rue des Francs-Bourgeois (2011)
- Episode 9 : Le Crime de l’hôtel Saint-Florentin (2013)
- Episode 10 : Le Sang des farines (2013)
- Episode 11 : Le Cadavre anglais (2014)
- Episode 12 : Le Noyé du Grand canal (2015)

=== Awards ===
- Festival de la fiction TV de La Rochelle 2008 : Best music
- Festival du film de télévision de Luchon 2013 : People's choice
