= Directorate of Cooperation of Security and Defence =

French government agency

- Direction de la coopération de sécurité et de défense

Directorate overview
- Formed: March 16, 2009
- Preceding Directorate: Department of Military and defense cooperation

The Directorate of Cooperation of Security and Defence (in French : Direction de la coopération de sécurité et de défense) is a structure belonging to the French Ministry of Foreign Affairs and International Development, intended to develop international structural cooperation in the fields of defense, internal security, and civil protection.

With an overall budget of €100 million over 105 programs and 209, the DCSD falls within the General Secretariat and is integrated into the General Directorate of Political Affairs and Security, Ministry of Foreign Affairs.

== History ==
Appearing in the 1960s with the independence of the territories of the former French colonial empire, defense cooperation has long been driven by two separate institutions: the Sub-Directorate of Military Assistance and the Military Cooperation Mission. Having become out of date after the end of the Cold War and globalization, this system was reformed and strengthened in December 1998 with the creation of the Department of Military and defense cooperation (DCMD), which unified these outdated structures under the responsibility of the Ministry of Foreign Affairs.

Since the 60s, the cooperation of Homeland Security was led by SCTIP (Department of International Technical Cooperation of Police), an entity belonging to the Ministry of the Interior. In 1998, during the creation of the DGCID (General Directorate for International Cooperation and Development ) in Foreign Affairs, the latter managed the structural police cooperation and civil security in close coordination with the SCTIP.

Taking into account the White Papers of Foreign Affairs and Security and Defence which highlighted the necessity of a global approach linking the concepts of security and defense, the March 16 2009 decrees about the organization of the central administration of the Ministry of Foreign Affairs established the DCSD, which officially replaced the DCMD and expanded its expertise in the fields of internal security (police and gendarmerie) and civil protection.

== Actions of the DCSD ==
As a tool for diplomatic influence, the DCSD is responsible for implementing training, advice, and expertise for which it ensures strategic leadership and comprehensive management within the realms of security and defense via cooperative bilateral or multilateral projects. It operates in all areas of security, defense, or Homeland Security (restructuring tools of defense, disarmament, crisis emergency preparedness, export support, demobilization, reintegration, etc.).

In a concern of policy coherence beyond the bilateral level, the DCSD follows and develops French policy in structural cooperation through regional and sub-regional approaches. The objectives of the DCSD are part of a global framework that aims to maintain peace, uphold the Rule of law and Human Rights, and ensure internal security and stability for their partners in a relationship based on equality.

Thus, the DCSD participates in supporting structural reforms of the armed and security forces of partner countries, provides advice and high-level expertise, and concentrates most of its activities on the training of personnel of the requesting country. Furthermore, the DCSD offers various technical and language training programs at international peacekeeping training centers, regional-focused national schools (ENVR) and different French military schools. These 17 ENVR and training centers provide a wide range of sixty programs, covering areas such as general military training, law enforcement, demining operations, and combating maritime insecurity. While the DCSD operates globally, its primary focus is on Africa, particularly sub -Saharan where 70% of its activities are carried out. The shared history and challenges faced by the region, along with the Francophone connection, explain the prioritization of cooperation activities in Africa. France aims to contribute to the strengthening of the African Peace and Security Architecture (APSA) and the capacity of African nations to engage in peacekeeping efforts (RECAMP).

== Actors of the DCSD ==
To implement its training and advice actions, the DCSD has about 350 cooperation volunteers (military, gendarmes, police and firefighters)posted to the French embassies' defense attached or Homeland Security in 56 beneficiary countries, or line item within major sub-regional organizations (ECCAS, ECOWAS, EASFCOM, IOC ...). So, nearly 130 partner countries and international organizations benefit from French co-operation activities of security and defense.

At headquarters, which stay at 57, Boulevard des Invalides in Paris, sixty people work for the definition of operations management. It is a complete interministerial collaboration, including diplomats but also policemen, gendarmes and officers. They are divided into offices and sub-directions following: Sub-Saharan Africa; World; Multilateral and sectoral issues; Means; Conferences and agreements; Overflights and naval stops.

The DCSD works closely with the Ministry of Defence, the Ministry of the Interior (through the Department for International Cooperation) and Staff armies (all three in charge of Operational Cooperation) and addresses security issues with a comprehensive approach.

DCSD's relations with its occidental partners are building first through the European Union, but also in collaboration with some third states (United States, Canada, Japan Brazil). Its efforts naturally intended to be carried out in synergy with those made by the UN system and the European Union.

== Principles ==
The DCSD bases its actions on bilateral conventions and aims to ensure the success of cooperative actions through gradual project implementation for partner countries to take ownership. Additionally, these projects contribute to expanding France's influence and international outreach by promoting French expertise, logistics, and know-how.

In sub-Saharan Africa, the approach of the DCSD is organized around three pillars : "safety, emergency and development", maintaining the logic of "African solutions to African problems." A safe continuum that allows both to protect populations, territory, wealth and areas of partner countries while countering threats from terrorism, illegal trafficking or socio-economic difficulties they may encounter.

== Recent achievements ==
Currently, the Department manages more than 200 cooperation projects around the world. Each year, the DCSD form over 3,500 students and reaches over 65,000 listeners. It contributes annually to the elaboration of a dozen of treaties or intergovernmental agreements on cooperation in defense. Every year, the IHEDN and the DCSD jointly organize international sessions about Asia (Middle East, South America, the euro-Mediterranean area, and the International Forum on Africa) at civilian and military high levels. Moreover, DCSD's actions aim to promote the teaching of French in military and security domains. It has elaborated the French military method titled "En Avant," in coordination with the International Organization of la Francophonie and the General Directorate of Globalization. Thus, in Ghana, six French centers were opened between 2003 and 2013, allowing the Lusophone countries to maintain a true decision-making capacity and influence in the planning and the conduct of joint operations with their francophone African partners, the practice of the French language being considered as a real vector of interoperability.

In the field of Homeland security, the DCSD relies on the financing programme "the Priority Solidarity Fund" (SPF). It has launched a project to fight against cocaine trafficking in Africa (ALCAO) and support civil protection services in Africa (APCA). Following intervention in Mali in 2013 which showed the importance of the search for a global response to contain the spread of armed radicalization. ALCAO interacts with the project "Justice and security in Sahel-Saharan region" (Jussec) whose DCSD controls the internal security component. It has enabled the Mauritanian police to seize 6.4 tons of cannabis in 2012.

Then, the action of the DCSD is translated into local projects, looking for an inter-donor complementarity, as evidenced by the Support Project to strengthen internal security in Benin (PARSIB) which created the first center operational IT shared between customs, gendarmerie and police in Africa. In the field of civil aviation security and the fight against false documents, the project "Support to the security of civil aviation in Africa" (ACASA) was initiated in March 2011 and aims to build the capacity of 22 States with regard to security of civil aviation. The same year was realized the project "Support to the Formation of Internal Security Forces in Africa" (AFORMA) which combines the police, gendarmerie and the national guards from 10 African countries. Finally, to support partner countries facing emerging issues, the DCSD has continued its commitment to the development of the State action at sea using the FSP ASCEMAR, including Cameroon. It supports the Civic Service Development Assistance (SCAD) in Madagascar Côte d'Ivoire and Guinea. In order to strengthen the capacity of developing countries' civil defense, whether institutional or human, the DCSD participated in the equipment and training of the first Civil Protection Units (UPC) in Guinea Conakry. End of 2013, the DCSD was associated with the development of the project "Support for the fight against trafficking in human beings" (THB) in the Gulf of Guinea, which combines internal capacity building and structuring regional cooperation. The future prospects of the DCSD are aligned with the main theme of Elysée summit on 6 and 7 December 2013, "Peace and Security in Africa" by wearing emphasis on the link between security and development and establishing the following three priorities:

- Strengthening African capabilities for security and defense to enable the stability of States in a comprehensive approach;
- The fight against terrorism and transnational trafficking in the Sahel-Saharan region;
- Maritime security, primarily in the Gulf of Guinea.

== The magazine Partners Defense Security ==
The DCSD publishes an issue of its magazine Partners Defense Security three times a year in order to compile the balance sheets, projects and prospects of cooperation activities. Formerly "Brothers of weapons", the magazine changed its name in June 2011 in line with the reform which includes defense cooperation, police, gendarmerie and civil protection within a single entity.

== The directors of the DCSD ==
- Since August 2013: Vice Admiral Marin Gillier
- 2010-2013: Lieutenant-General Bruno Clement-Bollee
- 2009-2010: Lieutenant-General Emmanuel Beth

=== Sitelink ===
==== Journals Partners security defense ====
- PSD n° 273
- PSD n° 272
- PSD n° 271
- PSD n° 270
- PSD n° 269
- PSD n° 268
- PSD n° 267
- PSD n° 266

==== The balance sheets of the DCSD ====
- Bilan DCSD 2012
- Bilan DCSD 2011
- Bilan DCSD 2010
