= Pierre Gambini =

French songwriter and composer

Pierre Gambini (born in Corte, Corsica) is a French songwriter and composer.

He started in the 1990s as part of the musical formation I Cantelli singing polyphonic Corsican songs and launched a solo career after singing with in the film Sempre Vivu! in 2006. He then launched an electro rock career.

He is most famous for writing the soundtrack and music score for the fourth season of the Corsican-themed French TV series Mafiosa broadcast in 2012 and for the follow-up Mafiosa - L'ultime saison in 2014.

== Discography ==
=== Albums and EPs ===
- Un omu ordinariu (7 tracks recorded during Mezzo Voce, 2007)
- Altru mondu (4 tracks, Mediterranean roots and Northern pop, 2010)
- Albe sistematiche (11-track album, 2011)
- Pierre Gambini EP (4 tracks, 2014)

=== Soundtracks ===
Year	Album	Peak positions	Certification
Year	Album	FR	Certification
2007	Sempre vivu!	–	
2009	A Prigiunera di San Ghjuvà (French title: La Prisonnière de Saint-Jean)	–	
2012	Mafiosa 4	132	
2014	Mafiosa - L'ultime saison	171	

=== Singles ===
Year	Single	Peak positions	Album
Year	Single	FR	Album
2012	Générique "Mafiosa 4"	69	Mafiosa 4

== Filmography ==
- 2007: Sempre vivu! - a musician
