= Jean Audureau =

French writer and playwright

- Born: 1932; Cholet, France
- Died: 2001 (aged 68–69); Paris, France
- Occupations: Writer and playwright
- Writing career
- Period: modern

Jean Audureau (1932–2001) was a French writer and playwright known for the whimsey of his work.

== Life and career ==
Jean Audureau was born in Cholet, France. He wrote his first play La Réception in 1956, and began his career in earnest in 1966 with À Memphis il y a un homme d’une force prodigieuse. He continued his success with Le Jeune Homme (1970), La Lève (1975) and Félicité (1983). More contemporary plays include Katherine Barker (1993), À l’image d’Hélène (1996) and L’Élégant Profil d’une Bugatti sous la lune (2002). Andureau was noted for the quality of his composition.

Audureau died in Paris in 2001.

== Works ==
Details on selected works include:

- Le Jeune Homme, directed by Dominique Quéhec, Théâtre National de Chaillot
- À Memphis il y a un homme d’une force prodigieuse, directed by Henri Ronse, Comédie-Française au Théâtre National de l'Odéon
- Félicité, directed by Jean-Pierre Vincent, world premiere at the Comédie-Française
- Katherine Barker, directed by de Jean-Louis Thamin, Théâtre des Abbesses
