= Gambito =

Gambito is a surname. Notable people with the surname include:

- Christine Gambito (born 1976), American Internet personality, actress, and comedian
- Jose Gambito, (born 1953), Filipino politician
- Sarah Gambito, American poet and professor
