= Hugues Pagan =

- Born: 1947 (age 78–79); Orléansville, French Algeria (now Algeria)
- Occupation: Detective writer

Hugues Pagan (born 1947) is a French detective writer and television writer.

== Early life ==
Hugues Pagan was born in 1947 in Orléansville, French Algeria (now Algeria). His father was a postman who also served in the Military reserve forces of France, and his mother was a school principal. He earned bachelor's degrees in sociology, psychology and philosophy, followed by a master's degree.

== Career ==
Pagan taught philosophy in Gérardmer from 1967 to 1970. He became a policeman in Nancy in 1972; he later worked in Belfort. By 1988, he was an investigator in the 1988 Gare de Lyon rail accident. He resigned in 1991.

Pagan is the author of detective novels. His first novel, La Mort dans une voiture solitaire, was published in 1982. He won the Prix Mystère de la critique for Dernière station avant autoroute in 1998. In 2017, he used the same protagonist as the one in his first novel, Charles Schneider, in Profil perdu.

Pagan is also a television writer; he has written for Police District Un flic, Mafiosa and Nicolas Le Floch.

== Personal life ==
Pagan resides in Charente-Maritime.

== Works ==
- Pagan, Hughes (1982). La Mort dans une voiture solitaire. Paris: Éditions Payot & Rivages.
- Pagan, Hughes (1983). L'Eau du bocal. Paris: Éditions Payot & Rivages.
- Pagan, Hughes (1983). Je suis un soir d'été. Paris: Éditions Payot & Rivages.
- Pagan, Hughes (1983). Vaines Recherches. Paris: Éditions Payot & Rivages.
- Pagan, Hughes (1984). Boulevard des allongés. Paris: Éditions Payot & Rivages.
- Pagan, Hughes (1985). Last Affair. Paris: Albin Michel.
- Pagan, Hughes (1987). Les Eaux mortes. Paris: Éditions Payot & Rivages.
- Pagan, Hughes (1990). L'Étage des morts. Paris: Albin Michel.
- Pagan, Hughes (1993). Tarif de groupe. Paris: Éditions Payot & Rivages.
- Pagan, Hughes (1997). Dernière station avant l'autoroute. Paris: Éditions Payot & Rivages. ISBN 9782743602451. OCLC 38042958.
- Pagan, Hughes (2017). Profil perdu. Paris: Éditions Payot & Rivages. ISBN 9782743639358. OCLC 978909916.
