= Saint-Germain-de-Modéon =

- Commune
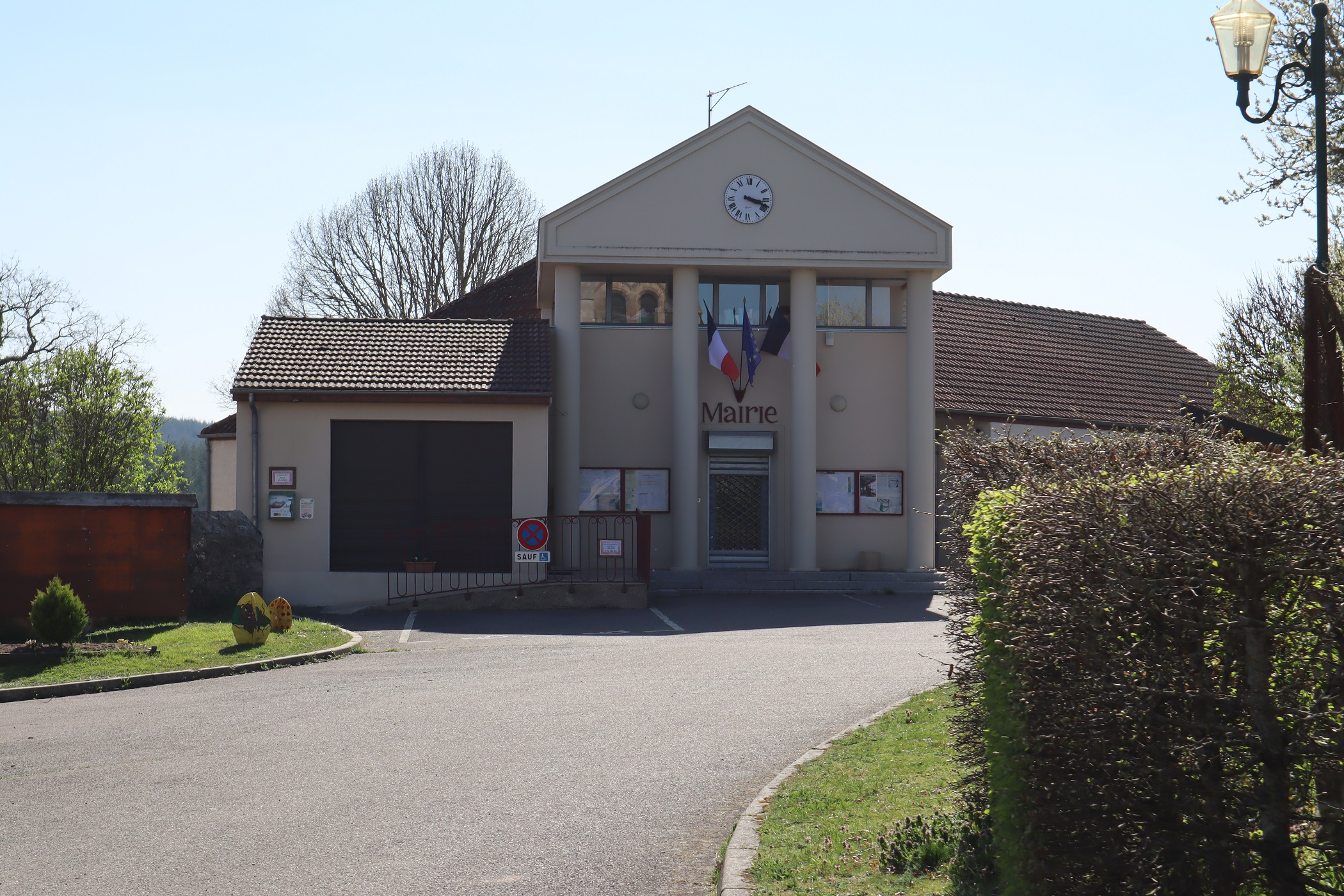
- Town hall
- Location of Saint-Germain-de-Modéon
- Location within France Location within Bourgogne-Franche-Comté
- Coordinates: 47°22′49″N 4°07′57″E
- Country: France
- Region: Bourgogne-Franche-Comté
- Department: Côte-d'Or
- Arrondissement: Montbard
- Canton: Semur-en-Auxois
- Intercommunality: CC Saulieu-Morvan

Government
  - Mayor (2020–2026): Valéry Loisier
- Area^{1}: 16.31 km^{2} (6.30 sq mi)
- Elevation: 415 m (1,362 ft)
- Highest elevation: 554 m (1,818 ft)
- Lowest elevation: 330 m (1,080 ft)
- Population (2023): 174
  - Density: 10.7/km^{2} (27.6/sq mi)
- Time zone: UTC+01:00 (CET)
  - Summer (DST): UTC+02:00 (CEST)
- INSEE/Postal code: 21548 /21530
- ^{1} French Land Register data, which excludes lakes, ponds, glaciers > 1 km^{2} (0.386 sq mi or 247 acres) and river estuaries.

Saint-Germain-de-Modéon (French pronunciation: [sɛ̃ ʒɛʁmɛ̃ də mɔdeɔ̃]) is a commune in the Côte-d'Or department and Bourgogne-Franche-Comté region of eastern France.

== Population ==
Historical population
| Year | Pop. | ±% p.a. |
|---|---|---|
| 1968 | 279 | — |
| 1975 | 195 | −4.99% |
| 1982 | 222 | +1.87% |
| 1990 | 173 | −3.07% |
| 1999 | 152 | −1.43% |
| 2007 | 184 | +2.42% |
| 2012 | 165 | −2.16% |
| 2017 | 172 | +0.83% |
| 2023 | 174 | +0.19% |
Source: INSEE

== See also ==
- Communes of the Côte-d'Or department
- Parc naturel régional du Morvan
