= 10 (miniseries) =

- Genre: Thriller, Drama
- Directed by: Jean-Laurent Chautems
- Country of origin: Switzerland
- Original language: French

Original release
- Network: TSR1
- Release: 21 November – 19 December 2010

10 is a scripted miniseries about a poker game. The series aired on TSR1 between 21 November and 19 December 2010.

== Awards ==
Year	Awards	Category	Result
2010	Festival de la fiction TV de La Rochelle	Best TV show	Won
